= 2012 All-Pac-12 Conference football team =

The 2012 All-Pac-12 Conference football team consists of American football players chosen by various organizations for All-Pac-12 Conference teams for the 2012 Pac-12 Conference football season. The Stanford Cardinal won the conference, defeating the UCLA Bruins 27–24 in the Pac-12 Championship game. Stanford then beat the Big Ten champion Wisconsin Badgers in the Rose Bowl 20 to 14. USC wide receiver Marqise Lee was voted Pac-12 Offensive Player of the Year. Arizona State defensive tackle Will Sutton was voted Pat Tillman Pac-12 Defensive Player of the Year.

== Offensive selections ==
=== Quarterbacks ===
- Marcus Mariota, Oregon (1st)
- Matt Scott, Arizona (2nd)

=== Running backs ===
- Kenjon Barner, Oregon (1st)
- Ka'Deem Carey, Arizona (1st)
- Johnathan Franklin, UCLA (2nd)
- Stepfan Taylor, Stanford (2nd)

=== Wide receivers ===
- Marqise Lee, USC (1st)
- Markus Wheaton, Oregon St. (1st)
- Austin Hill, Arizona (2nd)
- Robert Woods, USC (2nd)

=== Tight ends ===
- Zach Ertz, Stanford (1st)
- Austin Seferian-Jenkins, Washington (2nd)

=== Tackles ===
- David Bakhtiari, Colorado (2nd)

=== Guards ===
- David Yankey, Stanford (1st)
- Xavier Su'a-Filo, UCLA (1st)
- Jeff Baca, UCLA (2nd)
- Kevin Danser, Stanford (2nd)

=== Centers ===
- Brian Schwenke, California (1st)
- Hroniss Grasu, Oregon (1st)
- Khaled Holmes, USC (1st)
- Sam Brenner, Utah (2nd)
- Sam Schwartzstein, Stanford (2nd)

== Defensive selections ==
=== Ends ===
- Scott Crichton, Oregon St. (1st)
- Dion Jordan, Oregon (1st)
- Datone Jones, UCLA (2nd)
- Ben Gardner, Stanford (2nd)
- Morgan Breslin, USC (2nd)
- Henry Anderson, Stanford (2nd)

=== Tackles ===
- Star Lotulelei, Utah (1st)
- Will Sutton, Arizona St. (1st)

=== Linebackers ===
- Anthony Barr, UCLA (1st)
- Trent Murphy, Stanford (1st)
- Chase Thomas, Stanford (1st)
- Kiko Alonso, Oregon (2nd)
- Michael Clay, Oregon (2nd)
- Brandon Magee, Arizona St. (2nd)

=== Cornerbacks ===
- Ifo Ekpre-Olomu, Oregon (1st)
- Jordan Poyer, Oregon St. (1st)
- Desmond Trufant, Washington (1st)
- Alden Darby, Arizona St. (2nd)
- Nickell Robey, USC (2nd)

=== Safeties ===
- Ed Reynolds, Stanford (1st)
- Deone Bucannon, Washington St. (2nd)
- T. J. McDonald, USC (2nd)

== Special teams ==
=== Placekickers ===
- Vince D'Amato, California (1st)
- Andrew Furney, Washington St. (2nd)

=== Punters ===
- Jeff Locke, UCLA (1st)
- Josh Hubner, Arizona St. (2nd)

=== Return specialists ===
- Reggie Dunn, Utah (1st)
- Marqise Lee, USC (2nd)

=== Special teams player ===
- Jordan Jenkins, Oregon St. (1st)
- David Allen, UCLA (2nd)

== See also ==
- 2012 College Football All-America Team
