= 2012 Stanford Cardinal football team =

American college football season

2012 Stanford Cardinal football

Pac-12 champion Pac-12 North Division co-champion Rose Bowl champion

Pac-12 Championship Game, W 27–24 vs. UCLA

Rose Bowl, W 20–14 vs. Wisconsin
- Conference: Pac-12 Conference
- North Division

Ranking
- Coaches: No. 6
- AP: No. 7
- Record: 12–2 (8–1 Pac-12)
- Head coach: David Shaw (2nd season)
- Offensive coordinator: Pep Hamilton (2nd season)
- Offensive scheme: West Coast
- Defensive coordinator: Derek Mason (2nd season)
- Base defense: 3–4
- Captains: Chase Thomas; Stepfan Taylor; Sam Schwartzstein
- Home stadium: Stanford Stadium

2012 Pac-12 Conference football standings
	Conf.			Overall
Team	W		L	W		L
North Division
No. 7 Stanford xy$	8	–	1	12	–	2
No. 2 Oregon x%	8	–	1	12	–	1
No. 20 Oregon State	6	–	3	9	–	4
Washington	5	–	4	7	–	6
California	2	–	7	3	–	9
Washington State	1	–	8	3	–	9
South Division
UCLA xy	6	–	3	9	–	5
Arizona State	5	–	4	8	–	5
USC	5	–	4	7	–	6
Arizona	4	–	5	8	–	5
Utah	3	–	6	5	–	7
Colorado	1	–	8	1	–	11
Championship: Stanford 27, UCLA 24
$ – BCS representative as conference champion; % – BCS at-large representative; x – Division champion/co-champions; y – Championship game participant; Rankings from AP Poll

The 2012 Stanford Cardinal football team represented Stanford University in the 2012 NCAA Division I FBS football season. The Cardinal were led by second-year head coach David Shaw. They played their home games at Stanford Stadium and were members of the North Division of the Pac-12 Conference.

The Cardinal won their first Pac-12 championship since 1999 after defeating UCLA in the Pac-12 Football Championship Game. They represented the Pac-12 in the Rose Bowl, where they defeated Wisconsin to win their first Rose Bowl championship since 1972. This was Stanford's third consecutive year playing in a BCS bowl game. They finished the season with a 12–2 record (8–1 Pac-12).

== Schedule ==
Date	Time	Opponent	Rank	Site	TV	Result	Attendance
August 31	7:00 p.m.	San Jose State*	No. 21	Stanford Stadium; Stanford, CA (Bill Walsh Legacy Game)	P12N	W 20–17	40,577
September 8	7:30 p.m.	Duke*	No. 25	Stanford Stadium; Stanford, CA	P12N	W 50–13	44,016
September 15	4:30 p.m.	No. 2 USC	No. 21	Stanford Stadium; Stanford, CA (rivalry)	FOX	W 21–14	50,360
September 27	6:00 p.m.	at Washington	No. 8	CenturyLink Field; Seattle, WA	ESPN	L 13–17	55,941
October 6	12:00 p.m.	Arizona^{†}	No. 18	Stanford Stadium; Stanford, CA	FOX	W 54–48 ^{OT}	48,204
October 13	12:30 p.m.	at No. 7 Notre Dame*	No. 17	Notre Dame Stadium; Notre Dame, IN (Legends Trophy) (College GameDay)	NBC	L 13–20 ^{OT}	80,795
October 20	12:00 p.m.	at California	No. 22	California Memorial Stadium; Berkeley, CA (115th Big Game/Stanford Axe)	FOX	W 21–3	61,024
October 27	3:15 p.m.	Washington State	No. 19	Stanford Stadium; Stanford, CA	P12N	W 24–17	41,496
November 3	11:00 a.m.	at Colorado	No. 15	Folsom Field; Boulder, CO	FX	W 48–0	44,138
November 10	12:00 p.m.	No. 13 Oregon State	No. 16	Stanford Stadium; Stanford, CA	FOX	W 27–23	47,127
November 17	5:00 p.m.	at No. 1 Oregon	No. 14	Autzen Stadium; Eugene, OR (College GameDay, rivalry)	ABC	W 17–14 ^{OT}	58,792
November 24	3:30 p.m.	at No. 15 UCLA	No. 11	Rose Bowl; Pasadena, CA (rivalry)	FOX	W 35–17	68,228
November 30	5:00 p.m.	No. 17 UCLA	No. 8	Stanford Stadium; Stanford, CA (Pac-12 Championship Game)	FOX	W 27–24	31,622
January 1, 2013	2:10 p.m.	vs. Wisconsin*	No. 8	Rose Bowl; Pasadena, CA (Rose Bowl) (College GameDay)	ESPN	W 20–14	93,359
*Non-conference game; ^{†}Homecoming; Rankings from AP Poll released prior to the game; All times are in Pacific time

== Roster ==
2012 Stanford Cardinal roster
Quarterbacks: 5 Evan Crower – (redshirt) Freshman; 6 Josh Nunes – (redshirt) Junior; 7 Brett Nottingham – (redshirt) Sophomore; 8 Kevin Hogan – (redshirt) Freshman; 10 David Olson – (redshirt) Sophomore; 13 Robbie Picazo – (redshirt) Junior; 19 Adam Brzeczek – (redshirt) Freshman; Running backs: 26 Barry J. Sanders – Freshman; 22 Remound Wright – (redshirt) Freshman; 23 Jackson Cummings – (redshirt) Sophomore; 25 Tyler Gaffney – Senior; 29 Andrew Stutz – (redshirt) Junior; 30 Ricky Seale – (redshirt) Sophomore; 32 Anthony Wilkerson – Junior; 33 Stepfan Taylor – Senior; 39 Kelsey Young – (redshirt) Freshman; Fullbacks: 10 Geoff Meinken – (redshirt) Junior; 36 Lee Ward – (redshirt) Sophomore; 85 Ryan Hewitt – (redshirt) Junior; Centers: 61 Conor McFadden – (redshirt) Sophomore; 64 Sam Schwartzstein – (redshirt) Senior; 65 Khalil Wilkes – (redshirt) Junior; Offensive guards: 50 Cole Underwood – (redshirt) Sophomore; 63 Kevin Reihner – (redshirt) Freshman; 75 Dillon Bonnell – (redshirt) Sophomore; 76 Kevin Danser – (redshirt) Junior; Offensive tackles: 54 David Yankey – (redshirt) Sophomore; 60 Brian Moran – (redshirt) Freshman; 73 Cameron Fleming – (redshirt) Sophomore; 74 Brendon Austin – (redshirt) Freshman	Wide receivers: 4 Drew Terrell – Senior; 13 Rollins Stallworth – (redshirt) Freshman; 18 Jeff Trojan – (redshirt) Sophomore; 20 Keanu Nelson – (redshirt) Sophomore; 21 Jamal-Rashad Patterson – Senior; 44 John Flacco – (redshirt) Sophomore; 80 Sam Knapp – (redshirt) Junior; 84 Jemari Roberts – (redshirt) Junior; 87 Jordan Pratt – (redshirt) Freshman; 88 Ty Montgomery – Sophomore; 89 Devon Cajuste – (redshirt) Freshman; Tight ends: 9 Brandon Gottfried – (redshirt) Sophomore; 11 Levine Toilolo – (redshirt) Junior; 46 Matt Kasner – (redshirt) Freshman; 83 Davis Dudchock – (redshirt) Sophomore; 86 Zach Ertz – (redshirt) Junior; Defensive tackles: 56 Jacob Gowan – (redshirt) Junior; 58 David Parry – (redshirt) Sophomore; 72 J.B. Salem – (redshirt) Freshman; 95 Lance Callihan – (redshirt) Freshman; 97 Anthony Hayes – (redshirt) Freshman; 99 Terence Stephens – Senior; Defensive ends: 48 Kevin Anderson – (redshirt) Freshman; 49 Ben Gardner – (redshirt) Junior; 69 Eddie Plantaric – (redshirt) Sophomore; 72 J.B. Salem – (redshirt) Freshman; 79 Alex Yazdi – (redshirt) Freshman; 90 Josh Mauro – (redshirt) Junior; 91 Henry Anderson – (redshirt) Sophomore; 92 Charlie Hopkins – (redshirt) Freshman	Linebackers: 7 Patrick Skov – (redshirt) Freshman ILB; 9 James Vaughters – Sophomore OLB; 11 Shayne Skov – Senior ILB; 17 A. J. Tarpley – (redshirt) Sophomore ILB; 24 Cameron Vanderwall – (redshirt) Freshman OLB; 35 Jarek Lancaster – (redshirt) Junior ILB; 40 Joe Hemschoot – Sophomore ILB; 42 Alex Debniak – Senior ILB; 43 Blake Lueders – Junior OLB; 44 Chase Thomas – (redshirt) Senior OLB; 50 Brent Etiz – (redshirt) Junior ILB; 51 Sam Mercer – (redshirt) Freshman ILB; 53 Torsten Rotto – (redshirt) Freshman OLB; 93 Trent Murphy – (redshirt) Junior OLB; Defensive backs: 2 Wayne Lyons – Sophomore; 8 Jordan Richards – Sophomore; 23 Ronnie Harris – (redshirt) Freshman; 38 Ra’Chard Pippens – (redshirt) Freshman; Cornerbacks: 6 Terrence Brown – (redshirt) Junior; 15 Usua Amanam – (redshirt) Junior; 24 Quinn Evans – (redshirt) Senior; 28 Harold Bernard – (redshirt) Senior; 31 Barry Browning – Junior; 37 Chris Gaertner – (redshirt) Sophomore; Safeties: 5 Devon Carrington – Junior FS; 15 Brent Seals – (redshirt) Junior SS; 22 Kyle Olugbode – (redshirt) Sophomore SS; 29 Ed Reynolds – (redshirt) Sophomore SS; 41 Cason Kynes – (redshirt) Junior SS; 47 Myles Muagututia – (redshirt) Junior SS; Kickers: 19 Jordan Williamson – (redshirt) Sophomore; 47 Spencer Summers – (redshirt) Freshman; 46 Eric Whitaker – (redshirt) Junior; Punters: 14 Ben Rhyne – (redshirt) Sophomore; 36 Daniel Zychlinski – (redshirt) Senior; Long snappers: 62 Austin Tubbs – (redshirt) Freshman
Sources: 2012 Stanford Cardinal Football Spring Roster

== Coaching staff ==
- David Shaw – Head coach (Bradford M. Freeman director of football)
- Derek Mason – Associate head coach/defensive coordinator
- Pep Hamilton – Offensive coordinator/quarterbacks (Andrew Luck director of offense)
- David Kotulski – Inside linebackers
- Randy Hart – Assistant coach – defensive line
- Mike Bloomgren – Running game coordinator/offensive line
- Mike Sanford Jr. – Assistant coach – Running backs/recruiting coord.
- Lance Anderson – Assistant coach–outside linebackers/admissions Liaison
- Pete Alamar – Special teams coordinator
- Ron Crook – Tight ends/offensive tackles
- Shannon Turley – Head strength coach
- Nick Holz – Offensive assistant
- Aaron Moorehead – Offensive assistant
- Morgan Turner – Offensive assistant
- Tavita Pritchard – Defensive assistant

== Game summaries ==
=== San Jose State ===
Team	1	2	3	4	Total
Spartans	0	3	14	0	17
• #21 Cardinal	14	3	0	3	20

- Date: August 31
- Location: Stanford Stadium, Stanford, CA
- Game start: 7:00 p.m. PDT
- Television network: Pac-12 Network

Scoring summary
1	8:28	STAN	Stepfan Taylor 1-yard run (Jordan Williamson kick)	STAN 7–0
1	4:23	STAN	Drew Terrell 11-yard pass from Josh Nunes (Jordan Williamson kick)	STAN 14–0
2	10:23	SJSU	Austin Lopez 38-yard field goal	STAN 14–3
2	0:00	STAN	Jordan Williamson 46-yard field goal	STAN 17–3
3	11:08	SJSU	Blake Jurich 3-yard run (Austin Lopez kick)	STAN 17–10
3	2:17	SJSU	Noel Grigsby 21-yard pass from David Fales (Austin Lopez kick)	STAN 17–17
4	13:15	STAN	Jordan Williamson 20-yard field goal	STAN 20–17

Known as the "Bill Walsh Legacy Game" (Bill Walsh was a graduate of San Jose State and a two-time head coach at Stanford), this game marked the 66th meeting between Stanford and San Jose State—the most times Stanford has faced a single non-Pac-12 opponent. In their first game after the Andrew Luck era, the Cardinal struggled offensively, but persevered over the Spartans, taking a 20–17 victory. Luck's successor at quarterback, Josh Nunes, threw one touchdown pass and running back Stepfan Taylor rushed for 116 yards and scored Stanford's other touchdown in the first quarter. The Spartans added two third-quarter touchdowns—a Blake Jurich run and a David Fales to Noel Grigsby completion—to tie the score. A fourth-quarter field goal from Jordan Williamson put the Cardinal in front to stay.

=== Duke ===
Team	1	2	3	4	Total
Blue Devils	0	3	10	0	13
• #25 Cardinal	13	10	20	7	50

- Date: September 8
- Location: Stanford Stadium, Stanford, CA
- Game start: 7:30 p.m. PDT
- Television network: Pac-12 Network

Scoring summary
1	13:53	STAN	Drew Terrell 76-yard punt return (Jordan Williamson kick)	STAN 7–0
1	8:52	STAN	Jordan Williamson 35-yard field goal	STAN 10–0
1	1:23	STAN	Jordan Williamson 32-yard field goal	STAN 13–0
2	11:47	STAN	Stepfan Taylor 13-yard run (Jordan Williamson kick)	STAN 20–0
2	8:52	STAN	Jordan Williamson 22-yard field goal	STAN 23–0
2	0:12	DUKE	Ross Martin 29-yard field goal	STAN 23–3
3	12:46	STAN	Drew Terrell 19-yard pass from Josh Nunes (Jordan Williamson kick)	STAN 30–3
3	10:41	STAN	Levine Toilolo 3-yard pass from Josh Nunes (Jordan Williamson kick)	STAN 37–3
3	7:20	DUKE	Ross Martin 29-yard field goal	STAN 37–6
3	4:15	STAN	Ed Reynolds 71-yard interception return (kick blocked)	STAN 43–6
3	0:53	DUKE	Brandon Connette 4-yard run (Ross Martin kick)	STAN 43–13
4	14:18	STAN	Jamal-Rashad Patterson 27-yard pass from Josh Nunes (Jordan Williamson kick)	STAN 50–13

Drew Terrell returned a punt 76 yards for a touchdown and caught a Josh Nunes pass for another as Stanford routed Duke, 50–13. Nunes completed 16 of 30 passes for 275 yards and 3 touchdowns. Meanwhile, the Cardinal defense stifled the Blue Devils, holding them to just 27 rushing yards. Stanford defensive back Ed Reynolds intercepted Duke quarterback Sean Renfree twice, returning one 71 yards for another touchdown.

=== USC ===
Team	1	2	3	4	Total
#2 Trojans	7	7	0	0	14
• #21 Cardinal	7	0	7	7	21

- Date: September 15
- Location: Stanford Stadium, Stanford, CA
- Game start: 4:30 p.m. PDT
- Television network: FOX

Scoring summary
1	9:40	USC	Silas Redd 1-yard run (Alex Wood kick)	USC 7–0
1	6:43	STAN	Stepfan Taylor 59-yard run (Jordan Williamson kick)	Tied 7–7
2	11:19	USC	Silas Redd 1-yard run (Alex Wood kick)	USC 14–7
3	0:10	STAN	Stepfan Taylor 23-yard pass from Josh Nunes (Jordan Williamson kick)	Tied 14–14
4	10:20	STAN	Zach Ertz 37-yard pass from Josh Nunes (Jordan Williamson kick)	STAN 21–14

Stanford's defense held USC to just 26 rushing yards and sacked Matt Barkley 5 times as the Cardinal came from behind to upset the second-ranked Trojans, 21–14. Stanford won its fourth in a row against USC, its longest winning streak in the rivalry that dates to 1905. Stanford's Stepfan Taylor rushed for 153 yards and a touchdown and caught a touchdown pass from Josh Nunes that tied the game in the third quarter. Nunes later connected on a fourth-quarter strike to tight end Zach Ertz to put the Cardinal ahead to stay. Barkley, who likely finished his college career winless against Stanford, threw two interceptions as USC failed to score in the second half. Stepfan Taylor was named the Pac-12 Offensive Player of the Week for his efforts, and Stanford defensive end Ben Gardner, who recorded six tackles (3.5 tackles for losses) and a sack, was the conference Defensive Player of the Week.

=== Washington ===
Team	1	2	3	4	Total
#8 Cardinal	3	3	7	0	13
• Huskies	3	0	7	7	17

- Date: September 27
- Location: CenturyLink Field, Seattle, WA
- Game start: 6:00 p.m. PDT
- Television network: ESPN

Scoring summary
1	9:12	STAN	Jordan Williamson 31-yard field goal	STAN 3–0
1	6:43	UW	Travis Coons 43-yard field goal	Tied 3–3
2	1:10	STAN	Jordan Williamson 28-yard field goal	STAN 6–3
3	2:51	STAN	Trent Murphy 40-yard interception return (Jordan Williamson kick)	STAN 13–3
4	0:00	UW	Bishop Sankey 61-yard run (Travis Coons kick)	STAN 13–10
4	4:53	UW	Kasen Williams 35-yard pass from Keith Price (Travis Coons kick)	UW 17–13

Stanford failed to score an offensive touchdown for the first time since 2007 as the Huskies beat the Cardinal 17–13. The Husky defense held the Cardinal to just 235 yards of total offense. Stanford's defense was stingy in the first half, and gave the Cardinal its only touchdown of the day when linebacker Trent Murphy tipped and returned a Keith Price pass 40 yards for the score. But the Huskies broke through on the last play of the third quarter, when Bishop Sankey broke free on a fourth down play for a 61-yard touchdown run. Price connected with Kasen Williams for a touchdown pass late in the fourth quarter to seal the game for the Huskies.

=== Arizona ===
Team	1	2	3	4	OT	Total
Wildcats	0	13	20	15	0	48
• #18 Cardinal	7	7	20	14	6	54

- Date: October 6
- Location: Stanford Stadium, Stanford, CA
- Game start: 12:00 p.m. PDT
- Game attendance: 48,204
- Television network: FOX

Scoring summary
1	9:28	STAN	Zach Ertz 11-yard pass from Josh Nunes (Jordan Williamson kick)	STAN 7–0
2	12:06	ARIZ	Ka'Deem Carey 13-yard run (John Bonano kick)	Tied 7–7
2	6:20	ARIZ	John Bonano 33-yard field goal	ARIZ 10–7
2	2:48	STAN	Levine Toilolo 12-yard pass from Josh Nunes (Jordan Williamson kick)	STAN 14–10
2	0:15	ARIZ	John Bonano 33-yard field goal	STAN 14–13
3	13:06	ARIZ	Ka'Deem Carey 1-yard run (John Bonano kick)	ARIZ 20–14
3	10:51	STAN	Josh Nunes 2-yard run (Jordan Williamson kick)	STAN 21–14
3	8:17	ARIZ	Austin Hill 12-yard pass (John Bonano kick)	ARIZ 27–21
3	2:28	STAN	Stepfan Taylor 6-yard run (Jordan Williamson kick)	STAN 28–27
3	1:11	ARIZ	Austin Hill 17-yard pass from Matt Scott (two-point conversion failed)	ARIZ 33–28
3	0:28	STAN	Kelsey Young 55-yard run (two-point conversion failed)	STAN 34–33
4	12:29	ARIZ	Ka'Deem Carey 8-yard run (Matt Scott pass to Austin Hill for two-point conversion)	ARIZ 41–34
4	9:13	ARIZ	Terrence Miller 10-yard pass from Matt Scott (John Bonano kick)	ARIZ 48–34
4	6:34	STAN	Josh Nunes 1-yard run (Jordan Williamson kick)	ARIZ 48–41
4	0:45	STAN	Josh Nunes 3-yard run (Jordan Williamson kick)	Tied 48–48
OT		STAN	Stepfan Taylor 21-yard run	STAN 54–48

Coming off a lackluster performance the previous week in which Stanford failed to score an offensive touchdown, Stanford's Josh Nunes threw for 360 yards and two touchdowns and rushed for three more as the Cardinal came back from a 14 point fourth quarter deficit to beat the Wildcats in overtime, 54–48. For the Wildcats, Ka'Deem Carey ran for three touchdowns and quarterback Matt Scott completed 45 of 69 passes (school records for attempts and completions), including three touchdown passes. However, on the first possession in overtime, Scott's pass was intercepted by Chase Thomas, setting up a 21-yard Stepfan Taylor touchdown run to win the game.

=== At Notre Dame ===
#17 Stanford Cardinal (4–1) at #7 Notre Dame Fighting Irish (5–0)

Quarter	1	2	3	4	OT	Total
Stanford	0	10	0	3	0	13
Notre Dame	3	0	0	10	7	20

at Notre Dame Stadium, South Bend, Indiana

- Date: October 13, 2012
- Game time: 3:30 p.m. EST
- Game weather: Rain, 53 °F (12 °C)
- Game attendance: 80,795
- Referee: Shawn Hochuli
- TV announcers (NBC): Tom Hammond, Mike Mayock, and Alex Flanagan
- Box Score

Game information

First quarter

- ND – Kyle Brindza 29-yard field goal, 0:36. Notre Dame 3–0. Drive: 4 plays, 4 yards, 0:51.

Second quarter

- STAN – Fumble recovered in end zone by Chase Thomas (Jordan Williamson kick), 6:06. Stanford 7–3.
- STAN – Jordan Williamson 48-yard field goal, 0:00. Stanford 10–3. Drive: 7 plays, 44 yards, 1:34.

Fourth quarter

- ND – Tyler Eifert 24-yard pass from Everett Golson (Kyle Brindza kick), 14:15. Tie 10–10. Drive: 8 plays, 52 yards, 4:18.
- STAN – Jordan Williamson 27-yard field goal, 6:12. Stanford 13–10. Drive: 16 plays, 65 yards, 8:03.
- ND – Kyle Brindza 22-yard field goal, 0:20. Tie 13–13. Drive: 12 plays, 79 yards, 5:52.

Overtime

- ND – TJ Jones 7-yard pass from Tommy Rees (Kyle Brindza kick). Notre Dame 20–13. Drive: 4 plays, 25 yards.

Top passers

- STAN – Josh Nunes – 12/25, 125 yards, 2 int
- ND – Everett Golson – 12/24, 141 yards, TD

Top rushers

- STAN – Stepfan Taylor – 28 rushes, 102 yards
- ND – Cierre Wood – 12 rushes, 66 yards

Top receivers

- STAN – Zach Ertz – 4 receptions, 55 yards
- ND – Tyler Eifert – 4 receptions, 57 yards, TD

In a defensive struggle with a controversial ending, Stanford fell to Notre Dame in overtime, 20–13. For the second time in three weeks, the Cardinal failed to score an offensive touchdown, with its lone touchdown coming as Chase Thomas recovered an Everett Golson fumble in the end zone. Stanford's defense later knocked Golson out of the game and replaced him with Tommy Rees. Notre Dame would tie the score on a Kyle Brindza field goal with 20 seconds left in regulation to send the game to overtime. Notre Dame got the ball first and Rees connected with TJ Jones on a 7-yard touchdown pass. Stanford quickly moved the ball to first-and-goal from the four, and after three Notre Dame stops, had the ball inside the one on fourth down. On the game's final play, Stepfan Taylor dove for the end zone, but his initial rush was stopped. Although he eventually reached the end zone, officials ruled that his forward progress had been stopped. An official review did not overturn the decision and Notre Dame took back the Legends Trophy.

=== California ===
115th Big Game

Team	1	2	3	4	Total
• #22 Cardinal	7	14	0	0	21
Golden Bears	0	3	0	0	3

- Date: October 20
- Location: California Memorial Stadium, Berkeley, CA
- Game start: 12:00 p.m. PDT
- Game attendance: 61,024
- Television network: FOX

Scoring summary
1	4:42	STAN	Stepfan Taylor 7-yard run (Jordan Williamson kick)	STAN 7–0
2	13:47	CAL	Vincenzo D'Amato 21-yard field goal	STAN 7–3
2	12:12	STAN	Levine Toilolo 9-yard pass from Kevin Hogan (Jordan Williamson kick)	STAN 14–3
2	8:15	STAN	Zach Ertz 20-yard pass from Josh Nunes (Jordan Williamson kick)	STAN 21–3

The Cardinal defense held the Bears to 3 yards rushing on the way to a 21–3 victory, their third straight Big Game win. Quarterback Josh Nunes threw for 214 yards and a touchdown. Backup quarterback Kevin Hogan threw and completed his first career pass for the Cardinal, a touchdown to Levine Toilolo. Stanford running back Stepfan Taylor rushed for 189 yards (a career-high) and a touchdown. He moved past Toby Gerhart for second place overall among Stanford's career rushing list. Taylor's 3,616 yards trails only Darrin Nelson.

This marked the first time that the Big Game was played in October. The game was moved due to scheduling issues created with the expansion of the conference and the television programming requirements of the Pac-12 Network.

=== Washington State ===
Team	1	2	3	4	Total
Cougars	0	10	0	7	17
• #19 Cardinal	3	7	7	7	24

- Date: October 27
- Location: Stanford Stadium, Stanford, CA
- Game start: 3:15 p.m. PDT
- Game attendance: 41,496
- Television network: Pac-12 Network

Scoring summary
1	8:23	STAN	Jordan Williamson 42-yard field goal	STAN 3–0
2	8:13	WSU	Dominique Williams 3-yard pass from Jeff Tuel (Andrew Furney kick)	WSU 7–3
2	7:26	STAN	Jamal-Rashad Patterson 70-yard pass from Josh Nunes (Jordan Williamson kick)	STAN 10–7
2	0:00	WSU	Andrew Furney 24-yard field goal	Tied 10–10
3	8:04	STAN	Ryan Hewitt 1-yard run (Jordan Williamson kick)	STAN 17–10
4	10:43	STAN	Ed Reynolds 25-yard interception return (Jordan Williamson kick)	STAN 24–10
4	6:29	WSU	Kristoff Williams 10-yard pass from Jeff Tuel (Andrew Furney kick)	STAN 24–17

Washington State, winless in Pac-12 play, kept Stanford close, but the Cardinal prevailed, 24–17. The Cardinal offense sputtered all day, with just 12 first downs on the day and converting only 5 of 12 third downs. Stepfan Taylor managed only 58 yards on 21 carries and no scores, while quarterback Josh Nunes completed just 7 of 15 passes and a lone touchdown pass to Jamal-Rashad Patterson. For Washington State, quarterback Jeff Tuel threw for 401 yards and two touchdown passes, but was sacked by the Cardinal defense 10 times, leading to an overall rushing yardage loss of 16 yards. Tuel also threw a fourth quarter interception that was returned for a touchdown by Stanford safety Ed Reynolds, which provided the final winning margin.

=== Colorado ===
Team	1	2	3	4	Total
• #15 Cardinal	7	28	10	3	48
Buffaloes	0	0	0	0	0

- Date: November 3
- Location: Folsom Field, Boulder, CO
- Game start: 11:00 a.m. PDT

Scoring summary
1	8:18	STAN	Ed Reynolds 52-yard interception return (Jordan Williamson kick)	STAN 7–0
2	14:30	STAN	Stepfan Taylor 26-yard run (Jordan Williamson kick)	STAN 14–0
2	8:26	STAN	Remound Wright 1-yard run (Jordan Williamson kick)	STAN 21–0
2	3:23	STAN	Zach Ertz 1-yard pass from Kevin Hogan (Jordan Williamson kick)	STAN 28–0
2	0:08	STAN	Stepfan Taylor 2-yard run (Jordan Williamson kick)	STAN 35–0
3	10:28	STAN	Jordan Williamson 31-yard field goal	STAN 38–0
3	5:08	STAN	Levine Toilolo 19-yard pass from Kevin Hogan (Jordan Williamson kick)	STAN 45–0
4	9:52	STAN	Jordan Williamson 35-yard field goal	STAN 48–0

Stanford head coach David Shaw turned over his offense to quarterback Kevin Hogan late in the first quarter as Stanford gave Colorado its first shutout at home in 26 years, 48–0. Whereas in previous weeks, quarterback Josh Nunes had looked ineffective, Hogan was extremely effective, running for 48 yards and throwing for 184 more and two touchdowns. Stepfan Taylor added two touchdown runs, and Ed Reynolds returned an interception for a touchdown, his third of the season.

=== Oregon State ===
Team	1	2	3	4	Total
#13 Beavers	0	10	13	0	23
• #16 Cardinal	14	0	7	6	27

- Date: November 3
- Location: Stanford Stadium, Stanford, CA
- Game start: 12:00 p.m. PDT
- Game attendance: 47,127
- Television network: FOX

Scoring summary
1	5:41	STAN	Stepfan Taylor 1-yard run (Jordan Williamson kick)	STAN 7–0
1	0:31	STAN	Ryan Hewitt 12-yard pass from Kevin Hogan (Jordan Williamson kick)	STAN 14–0
2	10:51	ORST	Terron Ward 7-yard run (Trevor Romaine kick)	STAN 14–7
2	2:21	ORST	Trevor Romaine 19-yard field goal	STAN 14–10
3	10:17	ORST	Markus Wheaton 22-yard pass from Cody Vaz (Trevor Romaine)	ORST 17–14
3	7:34	ORST	Trevor Romaine 42-yard field goal	ORST 20–14
3	3:30	ORST	Trevor Romaine 44-yard field goal	ORST 23–14
3	0:00	STAN	Stepfan Taylor 40-yard pass from Kevin Hogan (Jordan Williamson kick)	ORST 23–21
4	5:07	STAN	Zach Ertz 13-yard pass from Kevin Hogan (two-point conversion failed)	STAN 27–23

In his first start as quarterback, Kevin Hogan connected for two late touchdown passes to lead the Cardinal to a comeback victory over the Beavers, 27–23. Stanford had taken an early lead on a Stepfan Taylor run and a Hogan pass to Ryan Hewitt, but the Beavers took momentum into halftime on a Terron Ward run and a short field goal, and continued to control the game in the third quarter, taking the lead on a Cody Vaz touchdown pass to Markus Wheaton and padding it with two more Trevor Romaine field goals. But on the last play of the third quarter, Stanford's Taylor caught a short pass from Hogan and took it 40 yards to bring the Cardinal within 2 points. After Hogan's third touchdown pass of the day to Zach Ertz gave the Cardinal back the lead, quarterback Vaz fumbled on Oregon State's next possession and Stanford ran out most of the clock to secure the victory.

=== Oregon ===
Team	1	2	3	4	OT	Total
• #14 Cardinal	0	7	0	7	3	17
#1 Ducks	0	7	7	0	0	14

- Date: November 17
- Location: Autzen Stadium, Eugene, OR
- Game start: 5:00 p.m. PST
- Game attendance: 58,792
- TV announcers (ABC): Brent Musburger (play-by-play), Kirk Herbstreit, (color), Heather Cox (sideline)

Scoring summary
2	12:39	STAN	Kevin Hogan 1-yard run (Jordan Williamson kick)	STAN 7–0
2	3:26	ORE	Keanon Lowe 28-yard pass from Marcus Mariota (Alejandro Maldonado kick)	Tied 7–7
3	6:35	ORE	De'Anthony Thomas 6-yard run (Alejandro Maldonado kick)	ORE 14–7
4	1:35	STAN	Zach Ertz 10-yard pass from Kevin Hogan (Jordan Williamson kick)	Tied 14–14
OT		STAN	Jordan Williamson 37-yard field goal	STAN 17–14

In an overtime thriller, Stanford upset #1-ranked Oregon 17–14, all but ending the Ducks' hopes for a return to the BCS National Championship Game and putting the Cardinal in the driver's seat for the Pac-12 Championship Game and the Rose Bowl. Stanford's defense limited Oregon's rushing attack, then ranked third in the nation, to just 198 rushing yards, and held its leading rusher, Kenjon Barner, to just 66 yards. Oregon led 14–7 with less than two minutes to go before Kevin Hogan found Zach Ertz in the end zone for a touchdown catch that was initially ruled incomplete; further official review overturned the call, saying that Ertz controlled the ball before rolling out of bounds. In the first possession of overtime, Ducks kicker Alejandro Maldonado missed a 41-yard field goal. In Stanford's possession, kicker Jordan Williamson, who had been inconsistent most of the year and who had missed a game-winning attempt in the 2012 Fiesta Bowl, kicked a 37-yard field goal to give the Cardinal the win.

=== UCLA ===
Team	1	2	3	4	Total
• #11 Cardinal	7	14	14	0	35
#15 Bruins	7	3	7	0	17

- Date: November 24
- Location: Rose Bowl, Pasadena, CA
- Game start: 3:30 p.m. PST
- Television network: FOX

Scoring summary
1	10:21	STAN	Drew Terrell 11-yard pass from Kevin Hogan (Jordan Williamson kick)	STAN 7–0
1	8:21	UCLA	Joseph Fauria 13-yard pass from Brett Hundley (Kaʻimi Fairbairn kick)	Tied 7–7
2	8:22	STAN	Anthony Wilkerson 10-yard rush (Jordan Williamson kick)	STAN 14–7
2	6:43	STAN	Stepfan Taylor 49-yard rush (Jordan Williamson kick)	STAN 21–7
2	1:37	UCLA	Kaʻimi Fairbairn 48-yard field goal	STAN 21–10
3	7:41	STAN	Stepfan Taylor 1-yard rush (Jordan Williamson kick)	STAN 28–10
3	7:28	STAN	Usua Amanam 11-yard fumble return on kickoff return (Jordan Williamson kick)	STAN 35–10
3	1:53	UCLA	Johnathan Franklin 11-yard rush (Kaʻimi Fairbairn kick)	STAN 35–17

Stanford defeated UCLA 35–17 to clinch the Pac-12 North Division title, setting up a rematch with UCLA in the 2012 Pac-12 Football Championship Game. Stepfan Taylor rushed for two touchdowns, Anthony Wilkerson rushed for another, and Kevin Hogan threw a touchdown pass to Drew Terrell in a balanced offensive performance. Usua Amanam recovered a fumble following a kickoff and returned it for the final Stanford touchdown.

=== UCLA (Pac-12 Championship Game) ===
Pac-12 Championship Game

Team	1	2	3	4	Total
#17 Bruins	14	0	10	0	24
• #8 Cardinal	7	10	0	10	27

- Date: November 30
- Location: Stanford Stadium, Stanford, CA
- Game start: 5:00 p.m. PST
- Game attendance: 31,622
- Television network: FOX

Scoring summary
1	11:35	UCLA	Johnathan Franklin 51-yard run (Kaʻimi Fairbairn kick)	UCLA 7–0
1	6:07	STAN	Kevin Hogan 1-yard run (Jordan Williamson kick)	Tied 7–7
1	3:40	UCLA	Brett Hundley 5-yard run (Kaʻimi Fairbairn kick)	UCLA 14–7
2	12:57	STAN	Stepfan Taylor 1-yard run (Jordan Williamson kick)	Tied 14–14
2	0:00	STAN	Jordan Williamson 37-yard field goal	STAN 17–14
3	8:20	UCLA	Kaʻimi Fairbairn 31-yard field goal	Tied 17–17
3	1:04	UCLA	Johnathan Franklin 20-yard run (Kaʻimi Fairbairn kick)	UCLA 24–17
4	11:21	STAN	Drew Terrell 26-yard pass from Kevin Hogan (Jordan Williamson kick)	Tied 24–24
4	6:49	STAN	Jordan Williamson 36-yard field goal	STAN 27–24

The Cardinal earned its first Rose Bowl appearance in 13 years with a comeback 27–24 victory over the Bruins, whom they had met just six days earlier in their final regular season game. The Cardinal's rushing defense, ranked among the nation's best, gave up the most yards it had all season as the Bruins rushed for 284 yards, 194 of which came from Johnathan Franklin, who also scored two touchdowns. Stanford quarterback Kevin Hogan threw for 155 yards and a fourth-quarter touchdown to tie the score. Hogan also ran for Stanford's first touchdown. Stanford kicker Jordan Williamson had two field goals, including the game winner with less than 7 minutes remaining in the game. UCLA kicker Kaʻimi Fairbairn missed a 52-yard field goal that would have tied the game with 39 seconds left to send Stanford to its third straight BCS bowl appearance.

=== Wisconsin (Rose Bowl) ===
#23 Wisconsin vs. #8 Stanford

Team	1	2	3	4	Total
#23 Wisconsin	0	14	0	0	14
• #8 Stanford	14	3	0	3	20

- Date: January 1
- Location: Rose Bowl
  Pasadena, CA
- Game start: 3:00 p.m.
- Elapsed time: 3:06
- Game attendance: 93,359
- Game weather: Partly Cloudy
- Referee: Jerry McGinn (Big East)
- TV announcers (ABC): Brent Musburger (Play-by-play), Kirk Herbstreit (Analyst), Heather Cox & Tom Rinaldi (Sidelines)

Scoring summary
1	11:35	STAN	Kelsey Young 16-yard run (Jordan Williamson kick)	STAN 7–0
1	11:24	STAN	Stepfan Taylor 3-yard run (Jordan Williamson kick)	STAN 14–0
2	9:05	WISC	Montee Ball 11-yard run (Jack Russell kick)	STAN 14–7
2	6:19	STAN	Jordan Williamson 47-yard field goal	STAN 17–7
2	0:19	WISC	Jordan Frederick 4-yard pass from Curt Phillips (Jack Russell kick)	STAN 17–14
4	4:23	STAN	Jordan Williamson 22-yard field goal	STAN 20–14

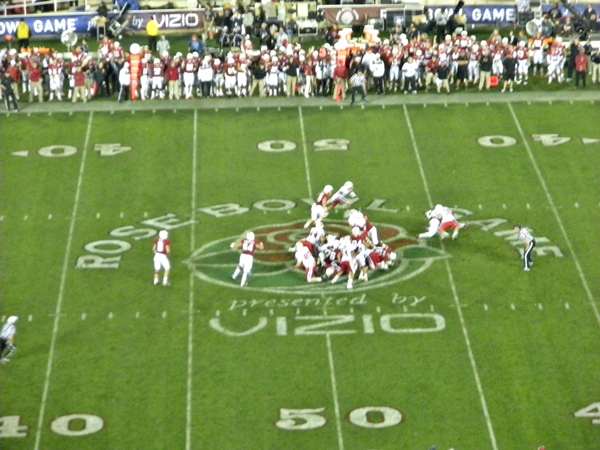
Stanford defeated Wisconsin in the 2013 Rose Bowl

Stanford won its first Rose Bowl in 41 years, winning 20–14 over Wisconsin, which lost its third Rose Bowl in as many years. The Cardinal appeared poised to run away with the game, scoring quickly on its first possession following a trick play where wide receiver Drew Terrell threw a 34-yard pass to Jamal-Rashad Patterson. Stepfan Taylor added a three-yard run on Stanford's next possession. Stanford held Wisconsin out of the end zone on fourth and goal from the one yard line but after punting from their own end zone, were unable to stop the Badgers' Montee Ball on an 11-yard touchdown run. Stanford's Jordan Williamson added a long field goal, and then Wisconsin scored just before halftime to close within three points. In the third quarter, teams exchanged punts as both defenses held firm and allowed no scoring. In the fourth quarter, Stanford drove inside the Wisconsin 10, but the Badgers forced a field goal keeping the game within a single score. But Stanford's Usua Amanam intercepted Curt Phillips on the next series, icing the game for the Cardinal.

== Rankings ==
Ranking movements Legend: ██ Increase in ranking ██ Decrease in ranking
	Week															
Poll	Pre	1	2	3	4	5	6	7	8	9	10	11	12	13	14	Final
AP	21	25	21	9	8	18	17	22	19	15	16	14	11	8	8	7
Coaches	18	21	16	11	9	18	17	23	19	15	15	13	11	9	8	6
Harris	Not released						16	20	18	14	14	13	11	8	7	Not released
BCS	Not released							20	17	14	14	13	8	8	6	Not released

== Statistics ==
=== Scores by quarter (all opponents) ===
	1	2	3	4	Total
Stanford	82	103	92	57	334
All Opponents	20	59	78	39	196

=== Scores by quarter (Pac-12 opponents) ===
	1	2	3	4	Total
Stanford	55	80	72	44	251
Pac-12 Opponents	17	53	54	29	153
