= Sam Schwartzstein =

American football player (born 1989)

Personal information
- Born: July 7, 1989 (age 37)
- Listed height: 6 ft 3 in (1.91 m)
- Listed weight: 292 lb (132 kg)

Career information
- Position: Offensive lineman (No. 64)
- High school: Carroll High School
- College: Stanford (2008–2012)
- NFL draft: 2013: undrafted

Career history
- XFL (2020) Director of operations

Awards and highlights
- Second-team All-Pac-12 (2012)

Sam Schwartzstein (born July 7, 1989) is an American former college football player who played for Stanford University. He was also the former director of operations for the 2020 iteration of the XFL, and is the current Prime Video analytics expert on Thursday Night Football.

Schwartzstein played offensive line for the Stanford Cardinal and was a team captain. He was a candidate for the 2013 NFL draft in late April 2013, but went undrafted.

== Early life ==
Schwartzstein is Jewish, and his hometown is Southlake, Texas. His father formerly owned a tire dealership.

He attended Carroll High School. As a junior playing left tackle, he helped the Carroll Dragons to 16–0 record and the Texas Class 5A state title, and as a senior he helped the team to an 11–2 record. He was Associated Press second team All-State and first team All-District as a senior in 2007. He was ranked the 52nd best offensive guard nationally by Scout.com. He was named All-Midwest Region for the Class of 2008 by PrepStar.

Schwartzstein had at least eight scholarship offers upon graduating high school, including Stanford, Purdue, and Colorado State. Scout.com's Texas analyst wrote that he:

uses position and leverage to make the plays on the field.... he is quick on the attack, and gets his hands inside the defender; he has enough pop in his hands and arms to not only control the defender but at times to knock him down... he gets the initial contact and the ability to control the situation. Second, he is aggressive in nature and will follow the defender downfield and look for a second block up field... He has good footwork... He is a highly developed tackle prospect... Overall, he is a very good offensive line prospect who plays smart, intelligent football.

He worked out at the 2007 Dallas NIKE Combine in March 2007, executing the 20-yard shuttle in 4.69, performing 24 reps in the bench press, and doing a vertical leap of 24.9".

He also competed in discus. At the Class 5A Region I Track and Field Championship in 2008, he came in 10th with a discus throw of 148–03.

== Playing career ==
=== College ===
Schwartzstein chose to attend Stanford, arriving as a guard. In 2010, he played in his junior year at Stanford in six games as a reserve on the offensive line.

In 2011, his senior year, he started all 13 games at center. After his first start, his head coach, David Shaw, said "I think Sammy Schwartzstein was outstanding, was off the charts. We expected him to play well, he surpassed our expectations". He helped Andrew Luck lead the Pac-12 in passing efficiency and completion percentage while breaking school records for career (82) and single-season (37) touchdown passes. Stanford also was tied for seventh nationally in fewest sacks allowed per game (0.85; 11 total). He helped running back Stepfan Taylor run for 1,330 yards, the second-highest single-season mark in school history. He helped Stanford compile a single-game school record 446 yards rushing in a 65–21 rout of No. 22 Washington.

In 2012, as a fifth-year senior considered a team motivator, he was elected a team captain by his teammates, and nicknamed "Coach Sammy" by them. Coach Shaw said "His ability to decipher things at the line of scrimmage and make sure everybody's on the same page is phenomenal. He sees (defenses) as well as any center I've been around." He was also a preseason candidate for the Rimington Trophy as the nation's top center. Before the 2012 season, Walter Football called him a "sleeper center prospect who deserves more attention." He was quoted in the New York Times as saying "I come from a high school where we ran the spread offense and it was just deep ball, deep ball, deep ball — that’s boring to me.... This is real football, grindstone. That’s how it’s supposed to be played.”

In 2012, the Cardinal played 14 games and allowed only 20 sacks. He was second-team All-Pac-12, and received Stanford's athletics plus leadership award, the Al Masters Award.

=== NFL draft ===
Some mock drafts had him being selected in the sixth or seventh round of the 2013 NFL draft, but many correctly predicted he would be an undrafted free agent. His time in the 40-yard dash was 5.12 (with a low of 4.96), 7th-best among draft-eligible centers.

== Post-playing career ==
Schwartzstein was a founder of the 2020 iteration of the XFL and helped to write their rulebook from scratch. As the XFL's director of operations, he also oversaw the league's compensation model for players and coaches, as well as on-field technology.

Starting in the 2023 NFL season, Schwartzstein is the analytics expert for Next Gen Stats, one of Thursday Night Football's weekly alternate streams.
