= Josh Nunes =

American football player (born 1990)

No. 6
- Position: Quarterback

Personal information
- Born: August 22, 1990 (age 36); Upland, California, U.S.
- Listed height: 6 ft 4 in (1.93 m)
- Listed weight: 225 lb (102 kg)

Career information
- College: Stanford (2009–2012)
- Stats at ESPN

Joshua Lawrence Nunes (born August 22, 1990) is an American former football quarterback for the Stanford Cardinal. He medically retired after a weightlifting injury that ruptured his pectoralis major tendon.

== Early life ==
Nunes attended Upland High School in Upland, California. During his career he threw for 6,306 passing yards and 54 touchdowns. He was ranked as the 13th best pro-style quarterback recruit in his class by Rivals.com.

== College career ==
Nunes spent 2009 to 2011 as a backup to Andrew Luck. On August 22, 2012, Nunes was named the starting quarterback for the 2012 season, beating out Brett Nottingham and Kevin Hogan.

As the starting quarterback, Nunes led the No. 21 Cardinal to an upset of No. 2 USC as he threw the go-ahead 37-yard touchdown pass to Zach Ertz in the fourth quarter. The next week, however, the Cardinal suffered a loss against unranked Washington in a game where Nunes was unable to score an offensive touchdown. After nine games as a starter, amid criticisms about his inconsistency, Nunes was replaced by redshirt freshman Kevin Hogan, who eventually led Stanford to a defeat of No. 1 Oregon, the Pac-12 championship and a Rose Bowl victory.

During a bench press workout in February 2013, Nunes dropped the weights on his chest, rupturing his pectoralis major muscle. As a result of the accident, Nunes announced that he has medically retired.

== Personal life ==
Nunes founded Believe Cross in 2015 with his Father, Tim, and works at the company with both his Father and Mother, Debbie. Believe Cross makes handmade, wooden crosses as an expression of Christian faith.
