= 2012 Pac-12 Football Championship Game =

- Conference Championship
UCLA Bruins	Stanford Cardinal
(9–3)	(10–2)
24	27
Head coach: Jim L. Mora	Head coach: David Shaw
AP / Coaches / BCS; 17 / 16 / 16	AP / Coaches / BCS; 8 / 9 / 8
	1	2	3	4	Total
UCLA	14	0	10	0	24
Stanford	7	10	0	10	27
- Date: November 30, 2012
- Season: 2012
- Stadium: Stanford Stadium
- Location: Stanford, California
- MVP: Kevin Hogan (QB, Stanford)
- Favorite: Stanford by 8
- National anthem: Pia Toscano
- Referee: Shawn Hochuli
- Attendance: 31,622

United States TV coverage
- Network: FOX (TV); ESPN Radio
- Announcers: Gus Johnson play-by-play Charles Davis color Julie Alexandria sideline #1; Petros Papadakis sideline #2 Radio: Bill Rosinski, David Norrie, Joe Schad

2012 Pac-12 Conference football standings
	Conf.			Overall
Team	W		L	W		L
North Division
No. 7 Stanford xy$	8	–	1	12	–	2
No. 2 Oregon x%	8	–	1	12	–	1
No. 20 Oregon State	6	–	3	9	–	4
Washington	5	–	4	7	–	6
California	2	–	7	3	–	9
Washington State	1	–	8	3	–	9
South Division
UCLA xy	6	–	3	9	–	5
Arizona State	5	–	4	8	–	5
USC	5	–	4	7	–	6
Arizona	4	–	5	8	–	5
Utah	3	–	6	5	–	7
Colorado	1	–	8	1	–	11
Championship: Stanford 27, UCLA 24
$ – BCS representative as conference champion; % – BCS at-large representative; x – Division champion/co-champions; y – Championship game participant; Rankings from AP Poll

The 2012 Pac-12 Football Championship Game was played on Friday, November 30, 2012 at Stanford Stadium in Stanford, California to determine the 2012 football champion of the Pac-12 Conference (Pac-12). It was the second football conference championship for the Pac-12 Conference, or any of its predecessors. The game featured the South Division champions, the UCLA Bruins, against the North Division champions, the Stanford Cardinal. The previous week, the two teams had met at UCLA's home stadium at the Rose Bowl, with Stanford winning 35–17 and clinching the Pac-12 North Division championship. Stanford headed back to Pasadena for the January 1, 2013 Rose Bowl Game where they defeated the Wisconsin Badgers 20–14.

This was UCLA's second consecutive appearance and Stanford's first appearance in the Pac-12 Championship Game. In 2011, the Bruins lost the inaugural game at Oregon.

== Scoring summary ==
Quarter	Time	Drive		Team	Scoring Information	Score	
Quarter	Time	Length	Time of Poss.	Team	Scoring Information	UCLA	Stanford
1	11:35	8 plays, 85 yards	3:25	UCLA	Johnathan Franklin 51-yard run (Kaʻimi Fairbairn PAT good)	7	0
1	6:07	11 plays, 69 yards	5:28	Stanford	Kevin Hogan 2-yard run (Jordan Williamson PAT good)	7	7
1	3:40	7 plays, 75 yards	2:27	UCLA	Brett Hundley 5-yard run (K. Fairbairn PAT good)	14	7
2	12:57	1 play, 1 yard	0:08	Stanford	Stepfan Taylor 1-yd run (J. Williamson PAT good)	14	14
2	0:00	10 plays, 62 yards	1:31	Stanford	J. Williamson 37 yard field goal	14	17
3	8:20	9 plays, 47 yards	4:41	UCLA	K. Fairbairn 31 yard field goal	17	17
3	1:04	12 plays, 80 yards	4:30	UCLA	J. Franklin 20-yd run (K. Fairbairn PAT good)	24	17
4	11:21	10 plays, 63 yards	4:43	Stanford	K. Hogan pass complete to Drew Terrell for 26 yards (J. Williamson PAT good)	24	24
4	6:49	5 plays, 25 yards	2:30	Stanford	J. Williamson 36 yard field goal	24	27
Final Score						24	27

=== Statistics ===
Statistics	UCLA	STAN
First downs	22	18
Total offense, plays – yards	70– 461	66–325
Rushes-yards (net)	38–284	43–170
Passing yards (net)	177	155
Passes, Comp-Att-Int	23–32–1	16–23–0
Time of Possession	28:45	31:15

== See also ==
- List of Pac-12 Conference football champions
