= Kevin Hogan =

American football player (born 1992)

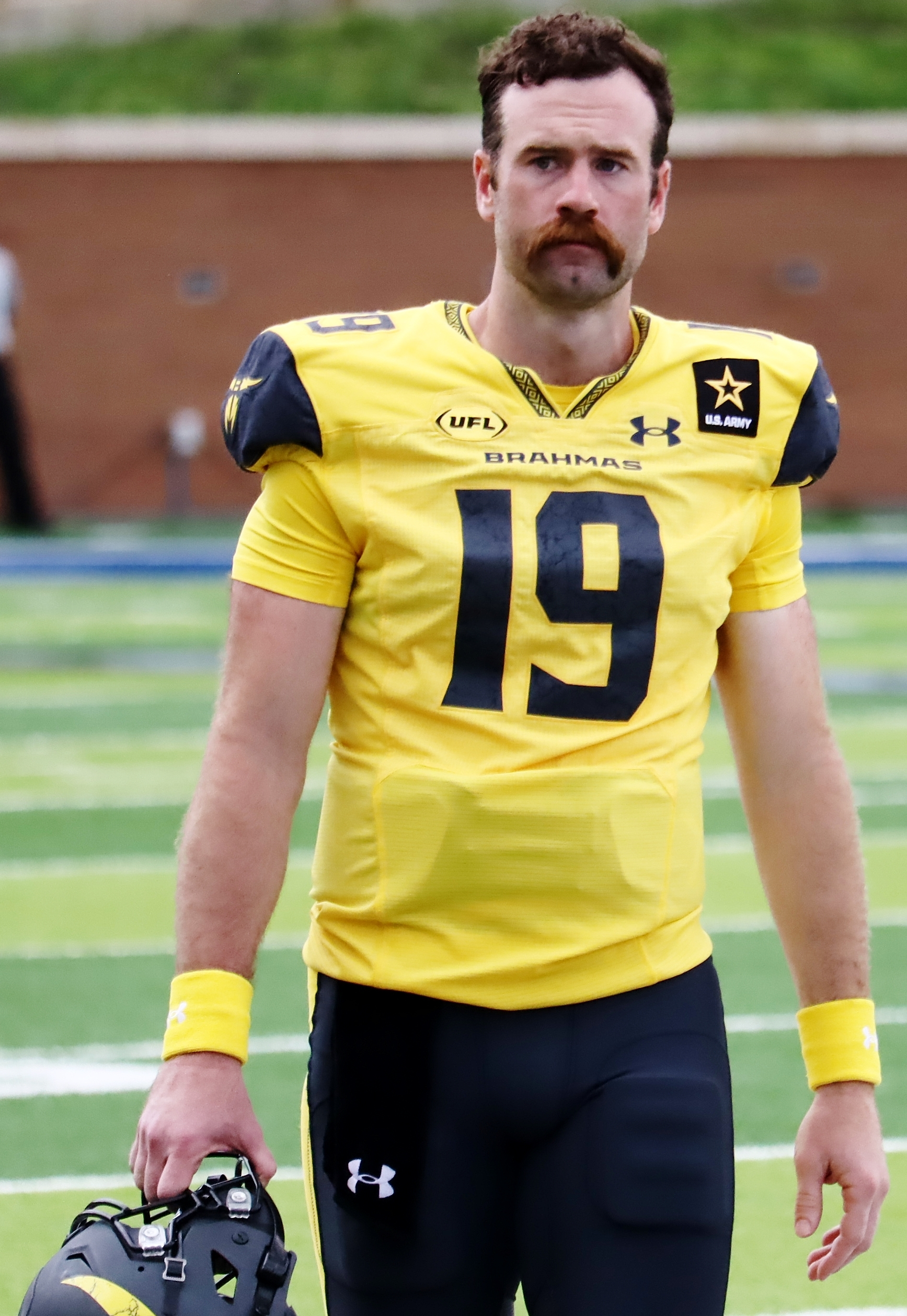
- Hogan with the San Antonio Brahmas in 2024

Profile
- Position: Quarterback

Personal information
- Born: October 20, 1992 (age 34); McLean, Virginia, U.S.
- Listed height: 6 ft 3 in (1.91 m)
- Listed weight: 218 lb (99 kg)

Career information
- High school: Gonzaga College (Washington, D.C.)
- College: Stanford (2011–2015)
- NFL draft: 2016: 5th round, 162nd overall pick

Career history
- Kansas City Chiefs (2016)*; Cleveland Browns (2016–2017); Washington Redskins (2018)*; Denver Broncos (2018); Cincinnati Bengals (2020); Tennessee Titans (2021); Houston Texans (2022)*; Tennessee Titans (2022)*; San Antonio Brahmas (2024–2025)
- * Offseason or practice squad member only

Awards and highlights
- Second-team All-Pac-12 (2015)

Career NFL statistics
- Passing attempts: 101
- Passing completions: 60
- Completion percentage: 59.4%
- TD–INT: 4–7
- Passing yards: 621
- Passer rating: 61.5
- Rushing yards: 176
- Rushing touchdowns: 1
- Stats at Pro Football Reference

Kevin Michael Hogan (born October 20, 1992) is an American professional football quarterback. He played college football for the Stanford Cardinal and was selected by the Kansas City Chiefs in the fifth round of the 2016 NFL draft. Hogan has also been a member of the Cleveland Browns, Washington Redskins, Denver Broncos, Cincinnati Bengals, Tennessee Titans, and Houston Texans.

== Early life ==
Hogan was born in McLean, Virginia, the son of Jerry and Donna Hogan. He has an older brother, Brian, and an older sister, Kelly. His grandfather played football at Navy, while his uncles played football at Notre Dame. Hogan attended Gonzaga College High School in Washington, D.C., where he played high school football for the Eagles and was a two-time first-team All-Washington Catholic Athletic Conference selection. As a senior, he earned D.C. Player of the Year honors and was a 2010 Washington Post First-team All-Met selection. He was also named the 2010 Outstanding High School Player of the Year for private schools by the Fairfax County Football Hall of Fame.

== College career ==
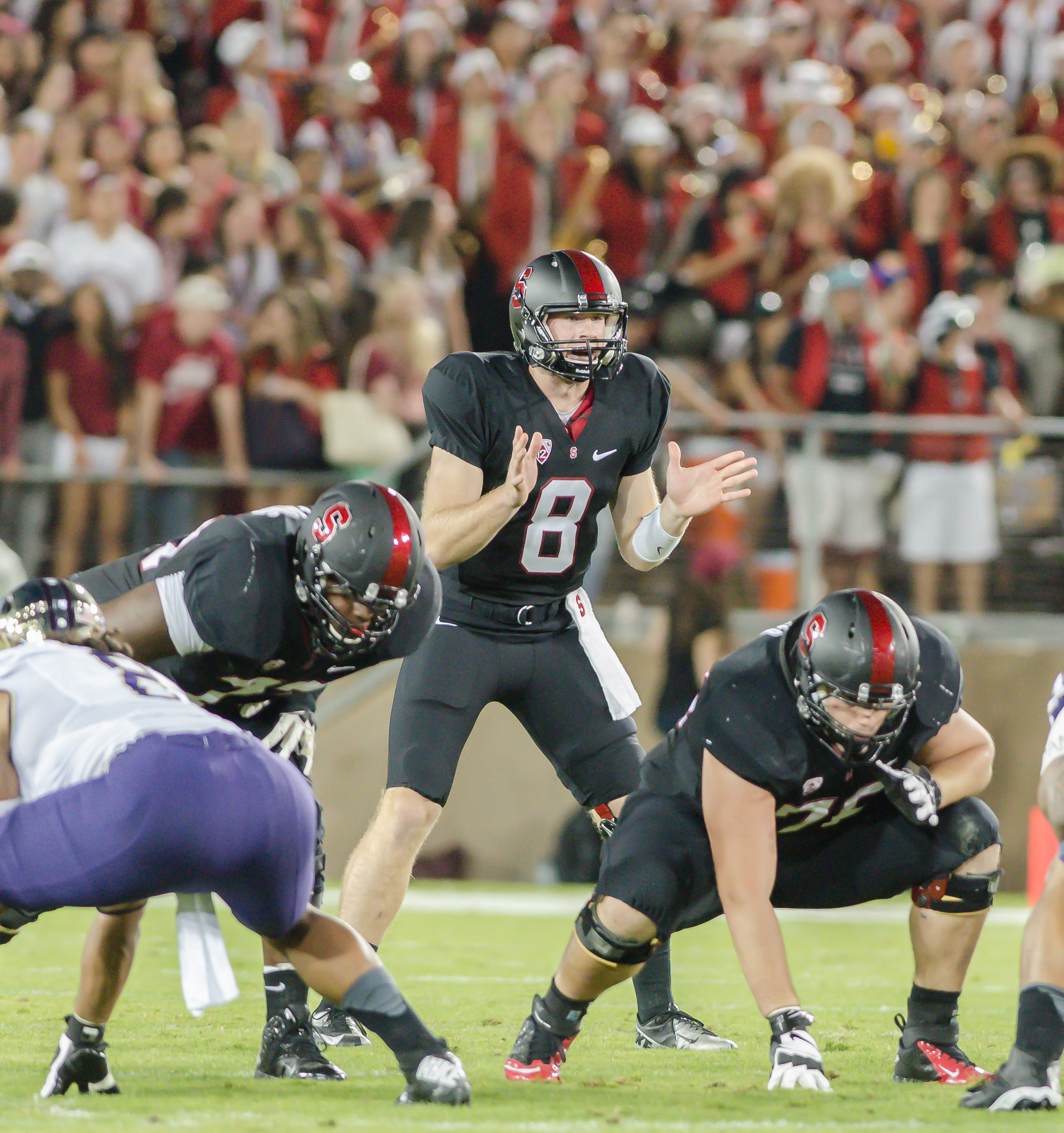
Hogan against the Washington Huskies in 2013

=== 2012 season ===
At Stanford University, Hogan saw extended play for the first time in his college career on November 3, 2012, when the Cardinal played the Colorado Buffaloes at Folsom Field. Hogan replaced Josh Nunes after the first two possessions and went 18-for-23 for 183 yards, throwing for two touchdowns and no interceptions, and recorded 48 rushing yards on seven carries. Following the game, Hogan was named the starting quarterback for the Cardinal, replacing Nunes. After becoming Stanford's starting quarterback, Hogan led the Cardinal to three straight regular-season victories against ranked opponents: #13 Oregon State, #2 Oregon, and #17 UCLA. When #17 UCLA and Stanford met in the 2012 Pac-12 Conference Championship six days after their regular-season meeting, Hogan led the Cardinal to a 27–24 victory, earning Most Valuable Player honors and sending the team to the 2013 Rose Bowl for the first time since 1999. At the Rose Bowl, Hogan led the Cardinal to a 20–14 victory against Wisconsin, ending the season on a five-game winning streak to finish with a 12–2 record. Despite limited playing time until late in the season, Hogan's 263 rushing yards were the seventh most by a Stanford quarterback in a season in school history.

=== 2013 season ===
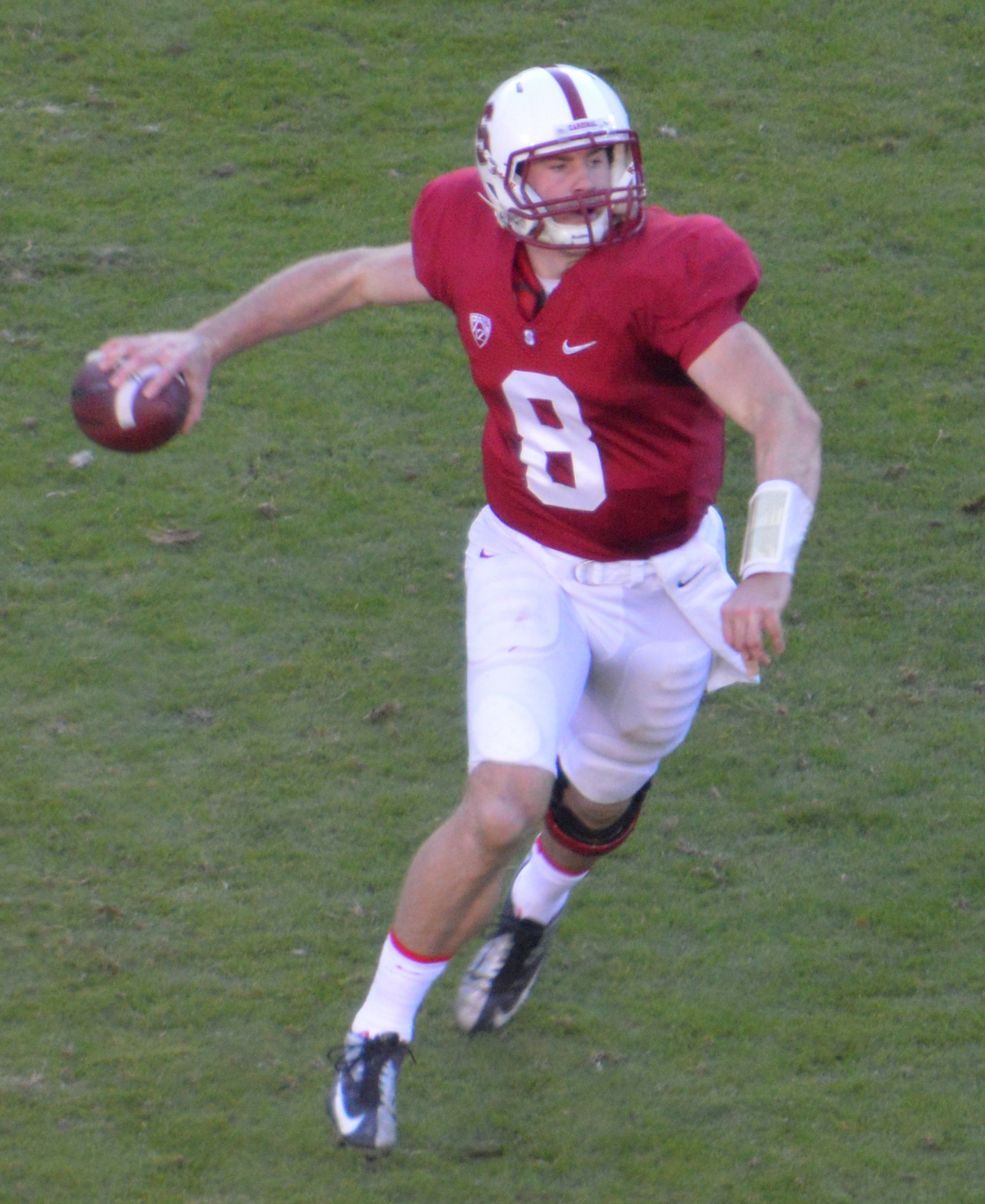
Hogan with the Stanford Cardinal in 2013

Hogan was again named the Cardinal's starter for the 2013 season. In the season opener against San Jose State on September 7, 2013, Hogan threw for 207 yards and two touchdowns. Hogan went on to lead the Cardinal to an 11–2 regular season record, with notable wins over Notre Dame, Oregon, UCLA, and Arizona State in the Pac-12 Championship game. In the 11th game of the season, Hogan threw for a career-best 349 yards and 5 touchdowns (all in the first half, and the most by a Stanford quarterback since 1999) in a 63–13 victory over rival California. These wins helped the Cardinal earn a spot in the 2014 Rose Bowl against Michigan State, where the Spartans won a narrow 24–20 victory after stopping Hogan and the Cardinal offense on a critical 4th down play, late in the fourth quarter. Hogan finished the season with 2,630 passing yards, 20 touchdowns passing, two rushing touchdowns, and 10 interceptions.

=== 2014 season ===
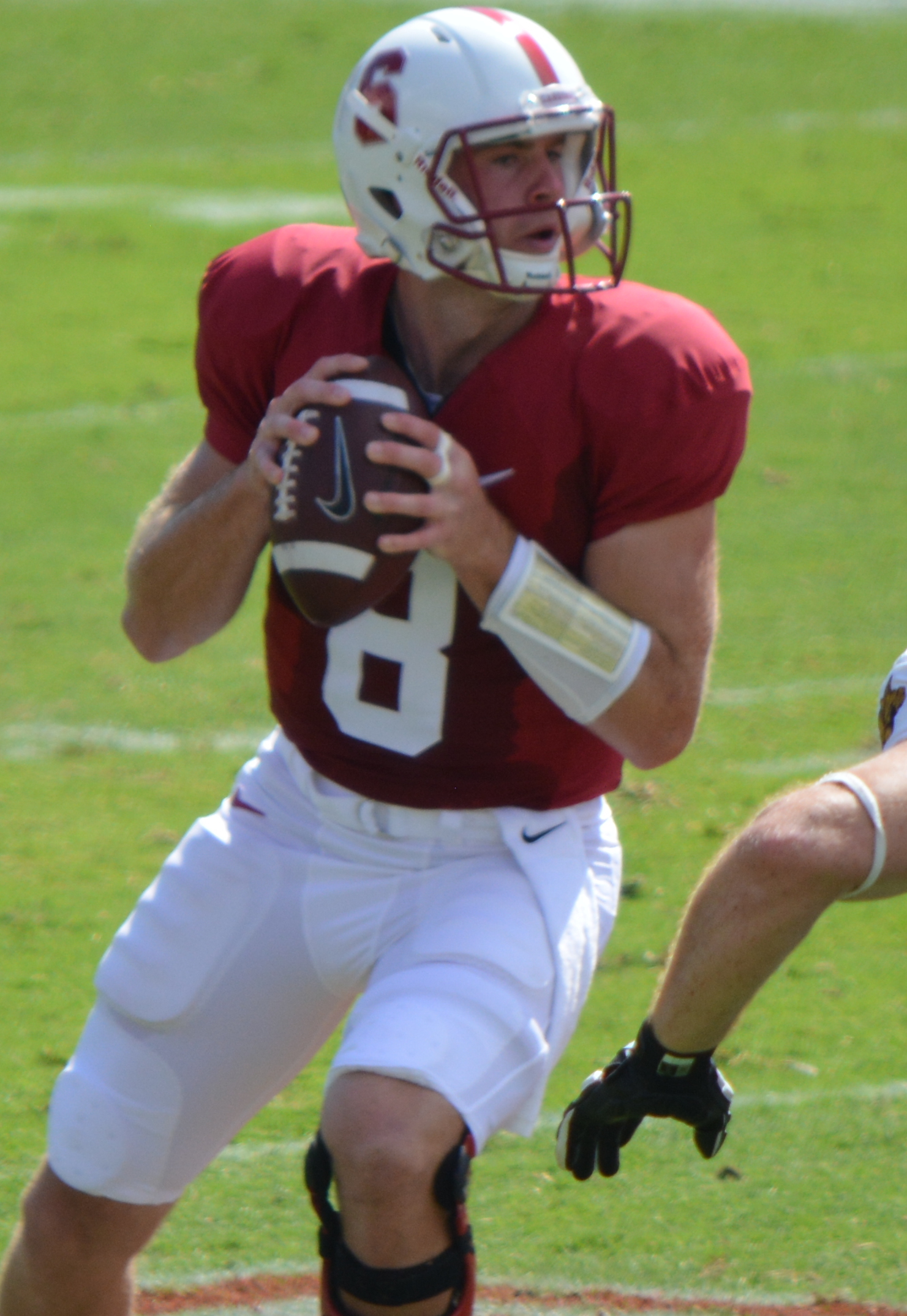
Hogan in 2014

Hogan remained the Cardinal's starting quarterback for the beginning of the 2014 season. They finished the regular season with an 8–5 record, with losses to their rivals, Notre Dame, along with four in-conference losses to USC, Arizona State, Oregon, and Utah. Stanford defeated the Maryland Terrapins 45–21 in the 2014 Foster Farms Bowl. In this game, Hogan completed 14-of-20 passes for 189 yards and two touchdowns, and also ran for 50 yards on seven attempts, earning the game's MVP award. He finished the season with 2,792 passing yards, 19 passing touchdowns, five rushing touchdowns, and eight interceptions.

=== 2015 season ===
After an upset loss to Northwestern in their opening game in 2015, the Cardinal rebounded by winning their next eight games and ended the season with a 12–2 record. They were the only team in college football that season to play only Power 5 teams throughout their schedule. During the 8-game winning streak, Hogan threw for 1,676 yards, 16 touchdowns, 5 interceptions, and also scored 3 rushing touchdowns. In a Halloween victory over Washington State, Hogan rushed for 112 yards and two late touchdowns, becoming only the second Stanford quarterback to rush for over 100 yards in a game. (Note: The first (and as of 2017 the only other) was Don Bunce in 1969, with 129 also against Washington St. See Stanford Media Guide Archived January 1, 2017, at the Wayback Machine) After a loss to Oregon, Hogan and the Cardinal won the rest of their regular season games, including a win against #6 Notre Dame, and claimed their third Pac-12 championship in four years. In his final college game, the 2016 Rose Bowl, Hogan helped lead Stanford to 35–0 halftime lead in an easy victory over Iowa. He finished the season with 2,867 passing yards and 27 touchdowns (tied for 3rd in school history), and rushed for 336 yards and 6 touchdowns (tying Jim Plunkett's 47-year-old school record). His 171.0 passing efficiency that season was a school record and fifth in the country, while his total offense of 3,203 yards is fourth all-time at Stanford. His 67.8% completion percentage was 2nd in the Pac-10 and 6th in the country, and his average 8.2 yards per play led the conference and was third in the country. He earned second-team All-Pac-12 honors.

Hogan ended his career with a 65.9% completion percentage, (Note: Second to Andrew Luck) 9,385 passing yards, (Note: Third to Steve Stenstrom and Andrew Luck) 75 passing touchdowns, (Note: Third to Andrew Luck and John Elway) and a school-record 15 rushing touchdowns. His 1,249 rushing yards is the most by a Stanford quarterback, and includes four of the top seven seasons in that category. His combined total offense of 10,634 yards is also a school record, and his career passing efficiency of 154.6 is second only to Andrew Luck, and he holds three of Stanford's top 10 seasons in both categories.

== Professional career ==
Pre-draft measurables
Height	Weight	Arm length	Hand span	40-yard dash	10-yard split	20-yard split	20-yard shuttle	Three-cone drill	Vertical jump	Broad jump	Wonderlic
6 ft 3 1/4 in (1.91 m)	218 lb (99 kg)	32 3/8 in (0.82 m)	10 1/4 in (0.26 m)	4.78 s	1.64 s	2.76 s	4.31 s	6.90 s	32.5 in (0.83 m)	9 ft 5 in (2.87 m)	38
All values from NFL Combine

=== Kansas City Chiefs ===
Hogan was selected in the fifth round (162nd overall) of the 2016 NFL draft by the Kansas City Chiefs on April 30. He was released by the Chiefs on September 3, 2016.

=== Cleveland Browns ===
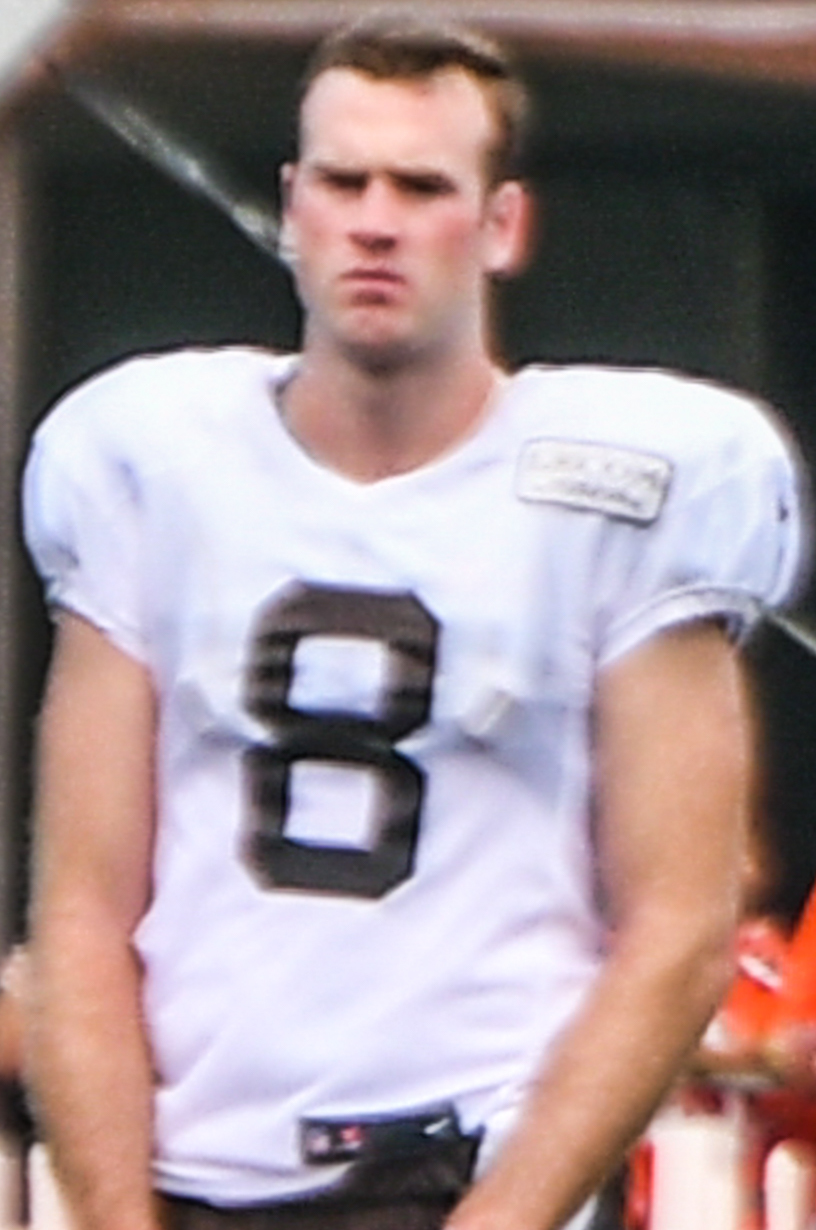
Hogan with the Cleveland Browns in 2017

==== 2016 season ====
Hogan was signed to the practice squad of the Cleveland Browns on September 5, 2016. On October 11, 2016, he was signed to the active roster. On October 23, 2016, versus the Cincinnati Bengals, he made his NFL debut. He initially entered the game being used in several read option packages at quarterback, rushing three times for 37 yards. However, once starting quarterback Cody Kessler suffered an injury in the second quarter, Hogan then played the rest of the game. Hogan finished the game having completed 12-of-24 passes for 100 yards with two interceptions while also rushing seven times for 104 yards and one touchdown. His touchdown was a 28-yard rush, which set a record for the longest touchdown run by a quarterback in Browns history. He was the second Browns quarterback to rush for over 100 yards in a game and the first quarterback in franchise history to do so as a rookie. He did not see much action after the Cincinnati game. In the next game, against the New York Jets, he came into the game and completed two passes for four yards in the 31–28 loss. He appeared in two more games over the course of the season but only recorded one rush for one yard against the Baltimore Ravens.

==== 2017 season ====
On September 8, 2017, Hogan was named the backup to DeShone Kizer. On September 17 against the Baltimore Ravens, Kizer left the game in the second quarter with a migraine headache. Hogan then entered the game, completing 5 of 11 passes for 118 yards, 1 touchdown, and 1 interception before Kizer returned in the third quarter. On October 1 against the Bengals, Hogan relieved Kizer with over six minutes remaining in the fourth quarter. Hogan completed 5-of-8 passes for 65 yards as the Browns lost by a score of 31–7. During Week 5 against the New York Jets, Hogan relieved the benched Kizer following halftime and completed 16 of 19 passes for 194 yards, 2 touchdowns and 1 interception as the Browns lost by a score of 17–14. On October 11, Hogan was named the Week 6 starter for the Browns at quarterback. In Week 6 against the Houston Texans, he completed 20 of 37 passes for 140 yards, 1 touchdown, and 3 interceptions as the Browns lost by a score of 33–17. He also rushed 5 times for 36 yards. Kizer was then renamed the starter. Hogan was also listed as inactive for the next three games due to a rib injury he sustained in his first start.

=== Washington Redskins ===
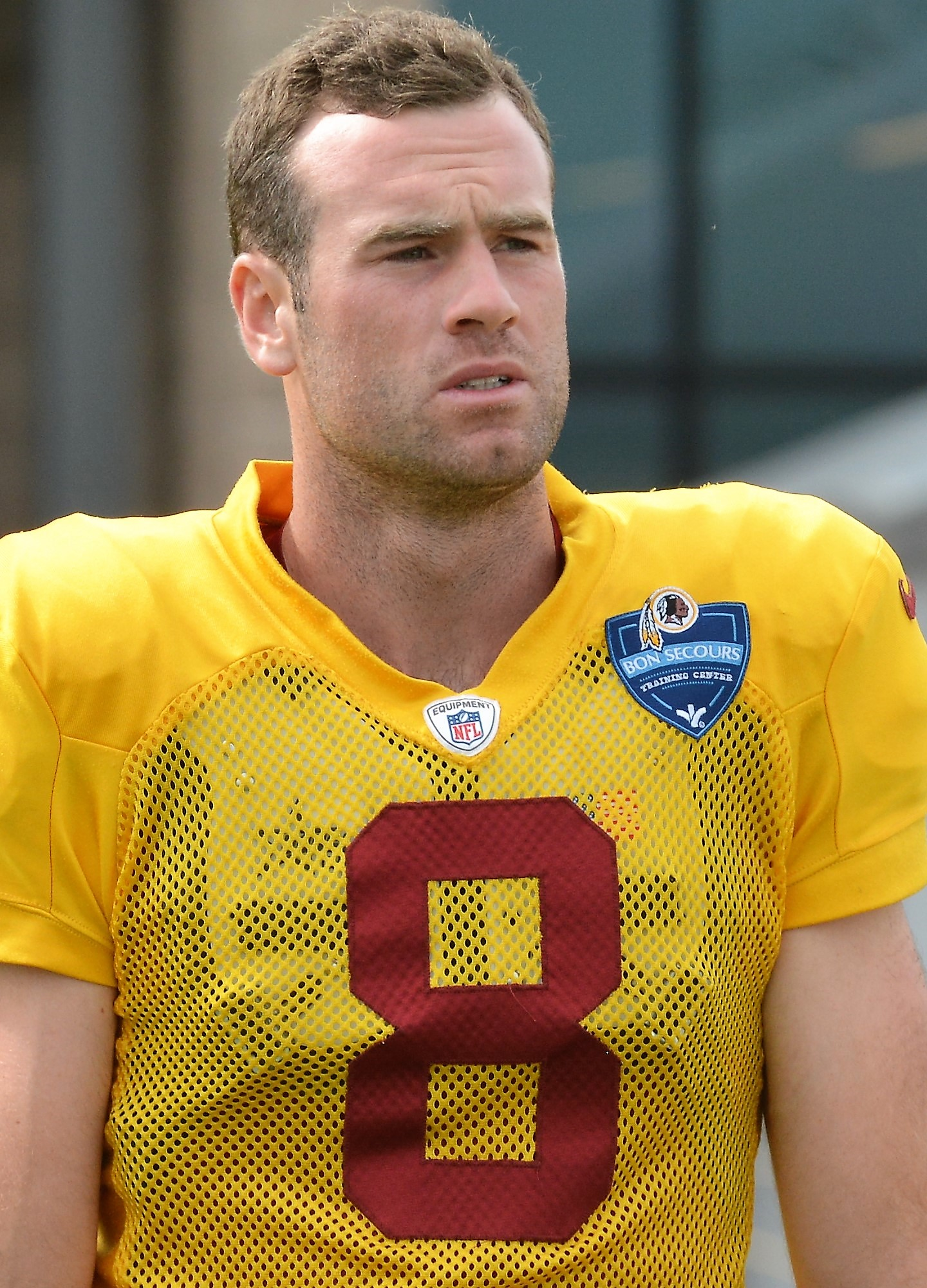
Hogan with the Washington Redskins in 2018

On April 6, 2018, Hogan was traded to the Washington Redskins in exchange for a swap of sixth round picks in the 2018 NFL draft. He was waived for final roster cuts before the start of the regular season on September 1, 2018.

=== Denver Broncos ===
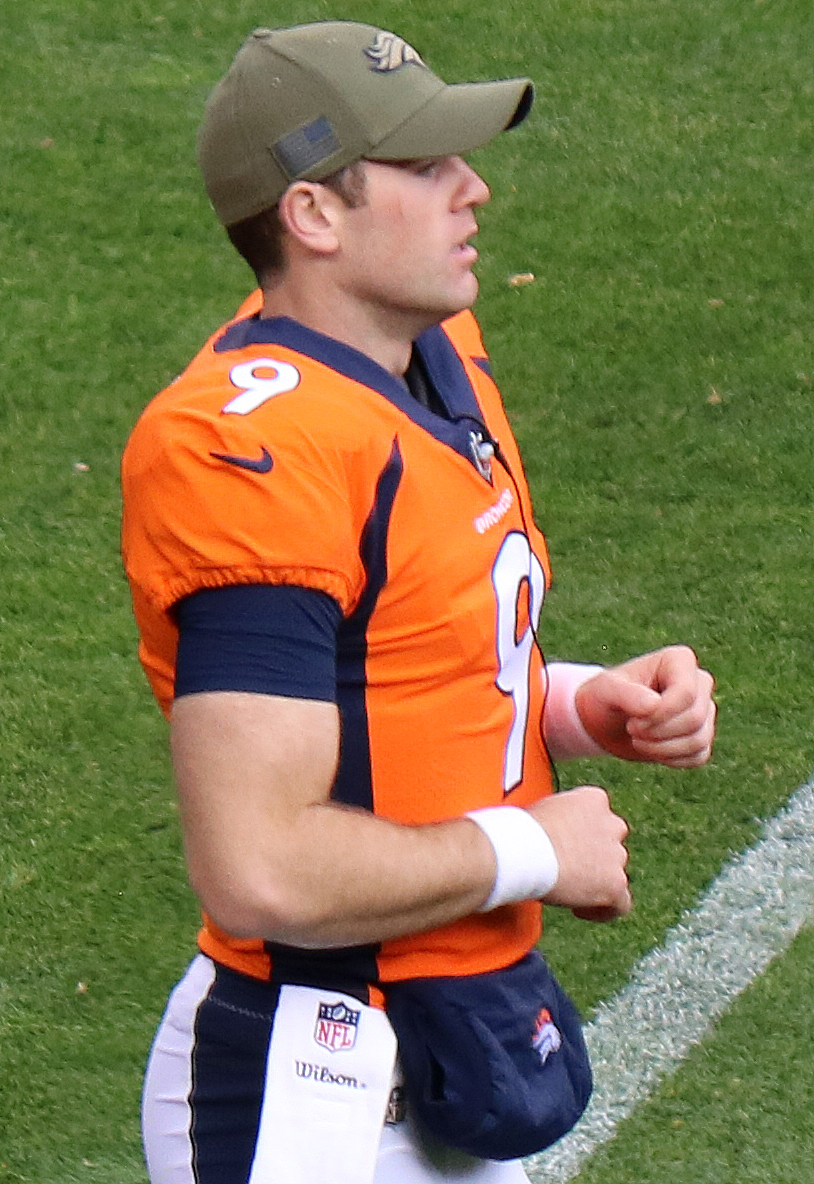
Hogan with the Denver Broncos in 2018

On September 2, 2018, Hogan was claimed off waivers by the Denver Broncos.

On March 21, 2019, Hogan re-signed with the Broncos. On August 31, 2019, he was released by the Broncos.

=== Cincinnati Bengals ===
On November 28, 2020, Hogan was signed to the Cincinnati Bengals practice squad after spending the entire 2019 season a free agent. He was elevated to the active roster on December 21 for the team's Week 15 game against the Pittsburgh Steelers, and reverted to the practice squad after the game. His practice squad contract expired after the season on January 11, 2021.

=== Tennessee Titans (first stint) ===
On November 10, 2021, Hogan was signed to the Tennessee Titans practice squad. Due to Logan Woodside being placed on the reserve/COVID-19 list, Hogan was elevated to the active roster to backup Ryan Tannehill in Week 12 against the New England Patriots. Hogan appeared in seven snaps on offense against the Patriots but did not attempt a pass. He reverted back to the practice squad after the game. After the Titans were eliminated in the Divisional Round of the 2021 playoffs, he signed a reserve/future contract on January 24, 2022. Hogan was released by the Titans on April 30, 2022.

=== Houston Texans ===
Hogan signed with the Houston Texans on May 4, 2022. He was released on August 1, 2022.

=== Tennessee Titans (second stint) ===
On December 13, 2022, the Titans signed Hogan to their practice squad. He was released on January 10, 2023.

=== San Antonio Brahmas ===
On April 17, 2024, Hogan signed with the San Antonio Brahmas of the United Football League (UFL). He appeared in three games for the Brahmas in 2024 but only attempted seven passes. He re-signed with the team on September 17, 2024. Hogan played in four games, starting three, during the 2025 season, throwing for 500 yards, two touchdowns, and four interceptions in his first starting action since 2017.

== Career statistics ==
Legend
**Bold**	Career high

=== NFL ===
Year	Team	Games			Passing									Rushing				
Year	Team	GP	GS	Record	Cmp	Att	Pct	Yds	Y/A	Lng	TD	Int	Rtg	Att	Yds	Y/A	Lng	TD
2016	CLE	4	0	—	14	26	53.8	104	4.0	17	0	2	31.6	8	**105**	**13.1**	**28**	**1**
2017	CLE	4	1	0–1	**46**	**75**	**61.3**	**517**	**6.9**	**49**	**4**	**5**	**71.9**	**10**	71	7.1	11	0
2021	TEN	1	0	—	0	0	0.0	0	0.0	0	0	0	0.0	0	0	0.0	0	0
Career		9	1	0–1	60	101	59.4	621	6.1	49	4	7	61.5	18	176	9.8	28	1

=== UFL ===
Year	Team	Games			Passing									Rushing				
Year	Team	GP	GS	Record	Cmp	Att	Pct	Yds	Y/A	Lng	TD	Int	Rtg	Att	Yds	Y/A	Lng	TD
2024	SA	3	0	—	5	7	**71.4**	38	5.4	15	0	0	**84.2**	2	3	1.5	3	0
2025	SA	4	3	0–3	**51**	**82**	62.2	**499**	**6.1**	**56**	**2**	**4**	67.1	**13**	**52**	**4.0**	**11**	0
Career		7	3	0–3	56	89	62.9	537	6.0	56	2	4	68.4	15	55	3.7	11	0

=== College ===
Season	Team	Games			Passing								Rushing			
Season	Team	GP	GS	Record	Cmp	Att	Pct	Yds	Y/A	TD	Int	Rtg	Att	Yds	Avg	TD
2011	Stanford	Redshirt														
2012	Stanford	10	5	**5–0**	109	152	**71.7**	1,096	7.2	9	3	147.9	55	263	**4.8**	2
2013	Stanford	14	14	11–3	180	295	61.0	2,630	8.9	20	**10**	151.5	84	**355**	4.2	2
2014	Stanford	13	13	8–5	**232**	**352**	65.9	2,792	7.9	19	8	145.8	**91**	295	3.2	5
2015	Stanford	14	14	12–2	206	304	67.8	**2,867**	**9.4**	**27**	8	**171.0**	85	336	4.0	**6**
Career		51	46	36–10	727	1,103	65.9	9,385	8.5	75	29	154.6	315	1,249	4.0	15
