= Trent Murphy =

American football player (born 1990)

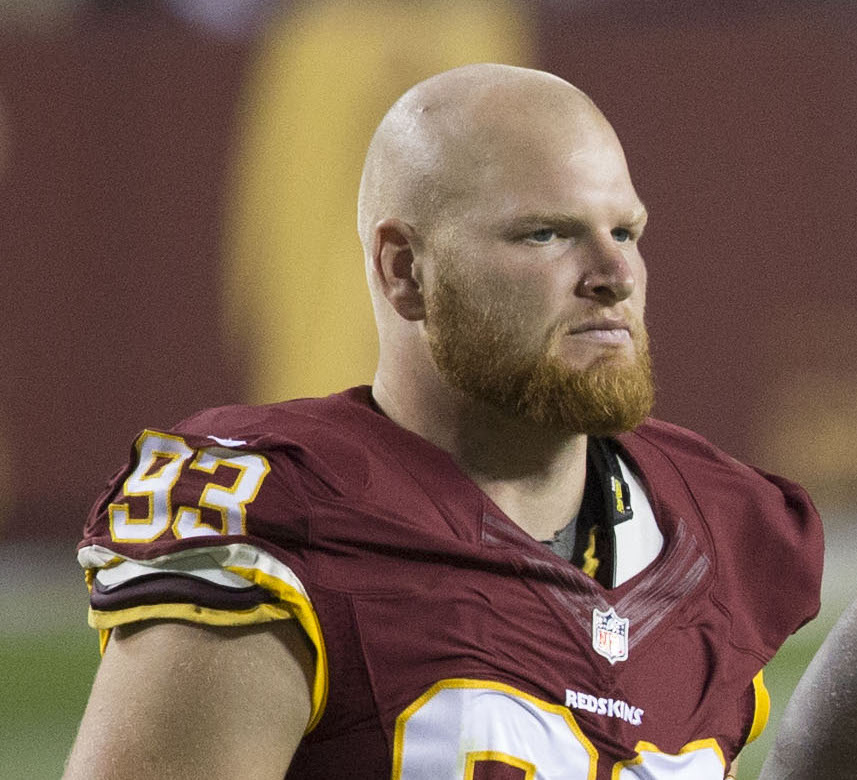
- Murphy with the Washington Redskins in 2015

No. 93
- Position: Defensive end

Personal information
- Born: December 22, 1990 (age 35); Scottsdale, Arizona, U.S.
- Listed height: 6 ft 6 in (1.98 m)
- Listed weight: 260 lb (118 kg)

Career information
- High school: Brophy College Preparatory (Phoenix, Arizona)
- College: Stanford (2009–2013)
- NFL draft: 2014: 2nd round, 47th overall pick

Career history
- Washington Redskins (2014–2017); Buffalo Bills (2018–2020)

Awards and highlights
- 2013 NCAA season sack leader (15); Consensus All-American (2013); First-team All-Pac-12 (2012, 2013)

Career NFL statistics
- Total tackles: 191
- Sacks: 26.0
- Forced fumbles: 10
- Fumble recoveries: 6
- Interceptions: 1
- Stats at Pro Football Reference

Trenton Allen Murphy (born December 22, 1990) is an American former professional football player who was a defensive end in the National Football League (NFL). He played college football for the Stanford Cardinal, and was selected by the Washington Redskins in the second round of the 2014 NFL draft. He also played for the Buffalo Bills.

== Early life ==
Murphy graduated in 2009 from Brophy College Preparatory He was a letterman in track. In Murphy's junior season, he helped back Brophy Prep to an Arizona 5A1 Division championship in 2007. As a senior, he served as team captain, leading Brophy to a runner-up 5A1 Division finish for the 2008 season.

In track & field, Murphy was one of the state's top performers in the discus, winning the Arizona State Championship in 2009 (top-throw of 58.70 meters). He also competed in the shot put.

== College career ==
=== Freshman and sophomore years ===
Murphy did not see field action in his freshman year in 2009 and was sidelined due to an injury two games into his sophomore year in 2010. During the two games he played in his sophomore year, Murphy logged one sack and two solo tackles against Sacramento State.

=== Junior year ===
In 2011, Murphy bounced back from his 2010 injury to record stellar numbers, logging 40 tackles, 6.5 sacks and 10 tackles for loss. In his first game against San Jose State, Murphy recorded 5 tackles. Murphy registered a career-high with 10 tackles, 9 solo, including 2 tackles for loss of yards against the Oregon Ducks. In the January 2, 2012 Fiesta Bowl against 13th-ranked Oklahoma State, Murphy sacked Brandon Weeden for a 9-yard loss. In sum over the 2011 season Murphy logged 6.5 sacks for -43 yards, 10 tackles for loss for -50 yards, 25 solo tackles and 15 assists.

=== Senior year ===
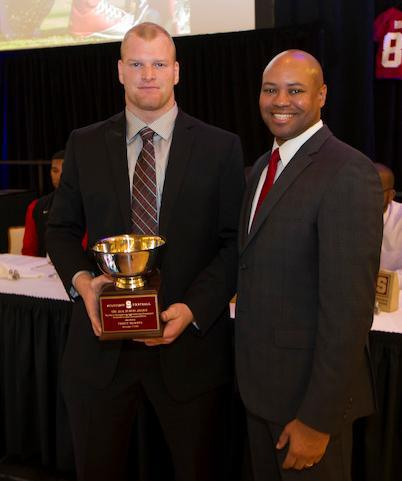
Stanford head coach David Shaw presenting Murphy with the Jack Huston Award in 2012

Murphy started all 14 games of the 2012 season for Stanford's Pac-12 championship season. He led the Cardinal defense with 10 sacks and 18 tackles for loss, the best defensive records for Stanford since 2000 and 2004 respectively. Murphy's season included 6 quarterback hurries, 4 passes broken up and 1 forced fumble. Murphy recorded his first career interception of a pass made by Keith Price, resulting in a 40-yard return for a touchdown. Murphy registered another career high game against number 1 ranked Notre Dame, with 10 tackles 1.5 sacks including 2.5 tackles for loss of yards. The Stanford defense was the 2012 NCAA Division I-A Sack Leader, with Murphy topping the list. Murphy was named to the All-Pac-12, 2012 1st team, CBS All America Team 3rd 2012 Associated Press All-American 3rd Team 3rd, and the 2012 Sports Illustrated All-American Team. He was a Butkus Award semi-finalist and won the Stanford-player voted Jack Huston Award recipient for exceptional performance and unheralded effort

=== Fifth-year senior ===
Murphy chose to return to Stanford for a fifth-year senior season, despite his option to enter the 2013 NFL draft. At the end of the 2013 season Murphy ranked first for sacks in the Pac-12, as well as, first for total number of sacks in the NCAA with a total of 15 sacks, 119 yards lost an average of 1.07 per game. In the category of tackles for loss, Murphy ranked second overall with 23.5 (83 yards total, 1.68 avg per game). Murphy was named Pac-12 Defensive Player of the week in weeks 6 (Oct. 7) and 9 (Oct. 28). On November 1, 2013 Murphy was named the Chuck Bednarik Player of the week, shortly after moving to the semi-finalist round of voting for the Bednarik Award. On November 8, 2013 Murphy moved to the semi-finalist round for the Lombardi Award given to the nation's best O/D lineman or linebacker. For the second year, Murphy was named to the All-Pac-12 First team, along with 5 Stanford Cardinal teammates. On Dec 7 the Stanford Cardinal defeated ASU to earn the Pac-12 Championship title for the second year in a row and earned the honor of playing in the 2014 Rose Bowl game, as they did in 2012. Also for the second year running, Murphy received Stanford's Jack Huston Award, voted by his peers as the player exemplifying aggressiveness, exceptional performance and unheralded efforts. Additionally, at the December 8, 2013 football awards ceremony, Murphy received the Frank Rehm memorial award for outstanding lineman in the Big Game (reference for 2 Stanford awards pending publication). Murphy was named to the 2013 Walter Camp Football Foundation All-American first team, in its 124th year. In addition to the Walter Camp Foundation honor, Murphy was voted to All-American teams by the Football Writers Association of America, American Football Coaches Association and Sporting News. These honors resulted in Murphy being named to the 2013 College Football Consensus All-American Team.

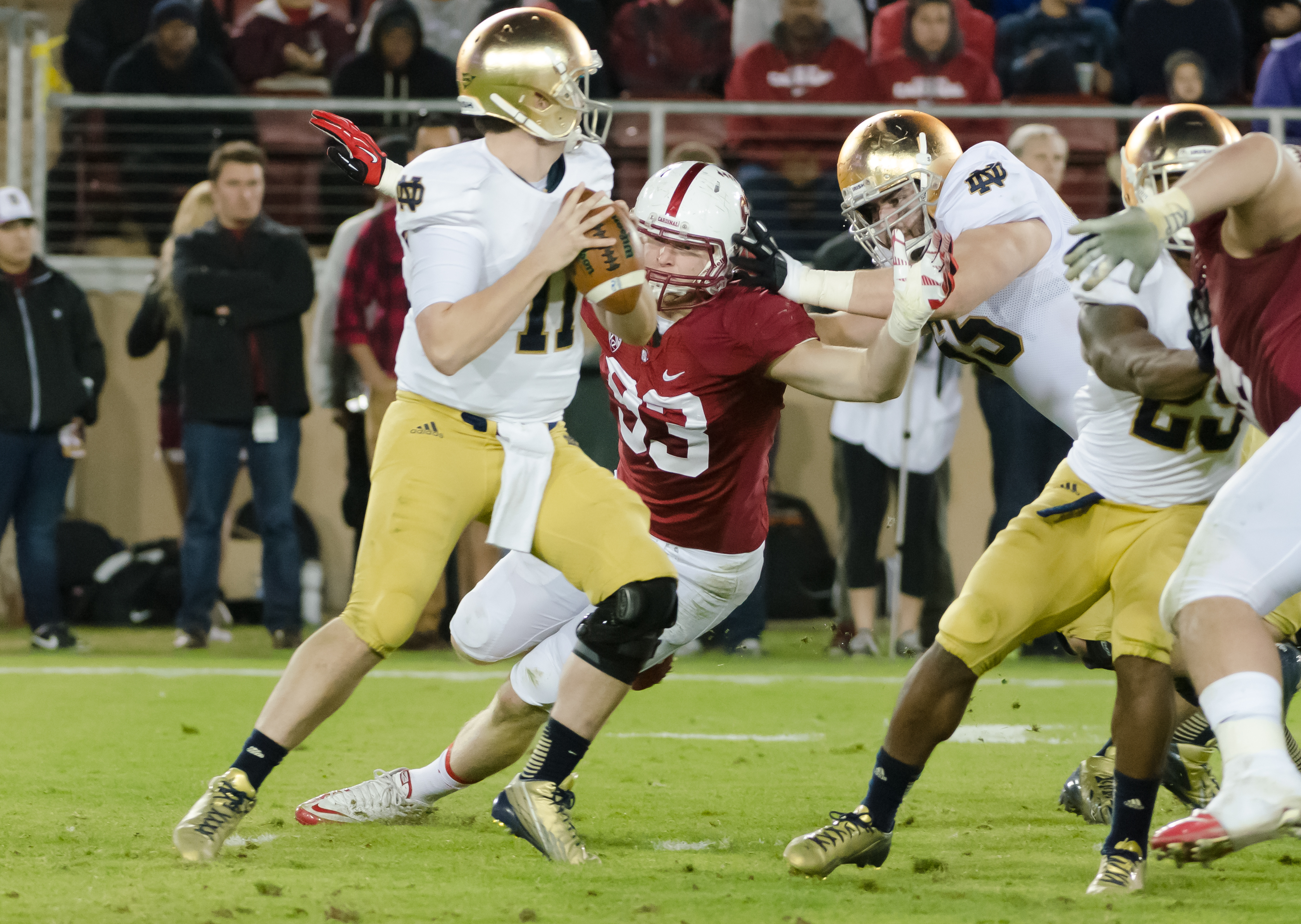
Murphy attempting to sack Notre Dame quarterback Tommy Rees

==== Awards ====
- Pre-season All-American second teams: SI.com Phil Steele Athlon Sports
- Pre-season All-Pac-12: Phil Steele Athlon Sports Lindy's All-Pac-12
- Team Captain
- Award watch list and semifinalist: Bednarik Award, Bronko Nagurski Award, Butkus Award, Rotary Lombardi Award
- Stanford's co-Defensive Player of the Game: vs San Jose State, vs Washington State, vs Oregon State
- Pac-12 Defensive Player of the Week, October 7 and again October 28
- Stanford's Jack Huston Award for exceptional performance and unheralded efforts, second year running.
- Stanford's Frank Rehm Memorial Award presented to the Outstanding Lineman in the Big Game.
- Post-season All-Pac-12 teams: ESPN.com Athlon Sports Second Team Sporting News
- Post-season All American Second teams; Associated Press CBSSports.com USA Today Athlon Sports
- Post-season All American First teams: Walter Camp Football Foundation American Football Coaches Association Football Writers Association of America Sporting News SI.com, ESPN.com
- Based on the votes for All-American honors, "Murphy is Stanford's first consensus defensive player since 1974"
- Reeses Senior Bowl in Mobile Alabama

== Professional career ==
=== Pre-draft ===
On December 18, 2013, it was announced that Murphy accepted his invitation to play in the 2014 Senior Bowl. During the practices leading up to the game, he was tested at both the defensive end and outside linebacker positions. Murphy was regarded as one of the top defenders in college football, but was seen as a disappointment by a media member during Senior Bowl practices. On January 25, 2014, Murphy played in the Reese's Senior Bowl and made four combined tackles as a part of Atlanta Falcons head coach Mike Smith's North team that lost 20–10 to the South. He was one of 35 collegiate linebackers to attend the NFL Scouting Combine in Indianapolis, Indiana. Murphy performed all of the combine drills, finishing second in the three-cone drill and 14th in the broad jump. On March 20, 2014, Murphy attended Stanford's pro day and opted to run his 40-yard dash (4.82s), 20-yard dash (2.80s), and 10-yard dash (1.67s) again. He also performed positional drills and met with team representatives and scouts from 29 NFL teams. At the conclusion of the pre-draft process, Murphy was projected to be a second or third round pick by NFL analysts and scouts. He was ranked the eighth best defensive end prospect in the draft by NFLDraftScout.com.

Pre-draft measurables
Height	Weight	Arm length	Hand span	40-yard dash	10-yard split	20-yard split	20-yard shuttle	Three-cone drill	Vertical jump	Broad jump	Bench press
6 ft 5 3/8 in (1.97 m)	250 lb (113 kg)	33 7/8 in (0.86 m)	11 1/8 in (0.28 m)	4.86 s	1.65 s	2.71 s	4.20 s	6.78 s	35 1/2 in (0.90 m)	9 ft 10 in (3.00 m)	19 reps
All values from NFL Combine

=== Washington Redskins ===
==== 2014 ====
The Washington Redskins selected Murphy in the second round (47th overall) of the 2014 NFL draft. Murphy was seen as a long-term solution for the possible departure of Brian Orakpo, who was franchise tagged and was designated to be a free agent after 2014. On May 23, 2014, the Redskins signed Murphy to a four-year, $4.47 million contract that includes $2.61 million guaranteed and a signing bonus of $1.57 million.

He entered training camp slated as the backup outside linebacker to veterans Ryan Kerrigan and Brian Orakpo. Head coach Jay Gruden officially named him the backup right outside linebacker to Orakpo to start the regular season.

He made his professional regular season debut in the Redskins' season-opening 17–6 loss at the Houston Texans. On September 21, 2014, Murphy recorded his first career tackle in a 37–34 loss at the Philadelphia Eagles. He made his tackle on running back LeSean McCoy and dropped him for a two-yard loss in the second quarter. On October 27, 2014, he earned his first career start in place of Brian Orakpo who was placed on injured reserve after suffering a torn pectoral. He finished the 19–17 victory over the Tennessee Titans with a solo tackle and one pass deflection. In Week 9, Murphy recorded four combined tackles and made his first career sack on quarterback Teddy Bridgewater as the Redskins lost 29–26 versus the Minnesota Vikings. On December 14, 2014, Murphy collected a season-high six combined tackles during a 24–13 loss at the New York Giants. The following week, he made his eighth consecutive start, but left the 27–24 win over the Eagles after suffering a hand injury. On December 23, 2014, the Washington Redskins placed Murphy on injured reserve after it was discovered he had fractured a bone in his right hand. He finished his rookie season with 32 combined tackles (28 solo), 2.5 sacks, and a pass deflection in eight starts and 15 games.

==== 2015 ====
Murphy entered training camp in 2015 as the Redskins' starting strongside linebacker following the departure of Brian Orakpo to the Tennessee Titans in free agency.

He started the season-opener against the Miami Dolphins and recorded three solo tackles in the 17–10 loss. On November 15, 2015, Murphy recorded a season-high five combined tackles and was credited with a half a sack on Drew Brees during a 47–14 victory over the New Orleans Saints. During a Week 13 matchup against the Chicago Bears, he made one solo tackle and had the first forced fumble of his career in their 24–21 victory. His forced fumble came on a sack on Bears' quarterback Jay Cutler. Murphy finished the 2015 season with 33 combined tackles (13 solo), 3.5 sacks, and a forced fumble in 14 starts and 16 games.

The Washington Redskins finished first atop the NFC East with a 9–7 record and received a playoff berth. On January 10, 2016, Murphy started in his first career playoff game and made one solo tackle in their 35–18 loss in the NFC Wildcard game to the Green Bay Packers.

==== 2016 ====
Prior to training camp, it was announced that Murphy would move from strongside linebacker to defensive end. Murphy gained over 30 lbs in order to be better suited to play the role. On August 8, 2016, it was reported that the move to defensive end was cancelled after Junior Galette, who was taking over the starting strongside linebacker role, suffered an achilles injury. Head coach Jay Gruden named Murphy the backup strongside linebacker behind Preston Smith to start the regular season.

On September 18, 2016, Murphy returned to defensive end after the line had multiple injuries and had underwhelming performances. He had six combined tackles and made two sacks on Dak Prescott in their 27–23 loss. This marked his first multi-sack game of his career. On October 2, 2016, he made a season-high five solo tackles and sacked Cody Kessler during the Redskins' 31–20 win over the Cleveland Browns. In Week 7, Murphy recorded two solo tackles and sacked Matthew Stafford in a 20–17 loss at the Detroit Lions. This was his sixth consecutive game with a sack. He finished the 2016 season with 47 combined tackles (29 solo), a career-high nine sacks, and a pass deflection in 16 games and zero starts.

==== 2017 ====
On April 14, 2017, Murphy was suspended four games for violating the league's policy on performance enhancing substances policy. On August 10, 2017, Murphy suffered a leg injury in the Redskins' 23–3 loss to the Baltimore Ravens in their preseason-opener. On August 11, 2017, Murphy underwent an MRI and it was discovered he had suffered a torn ACL. He was placed in injured reserve and missed the entire 2017 season.

=== Buffalo Bills ===
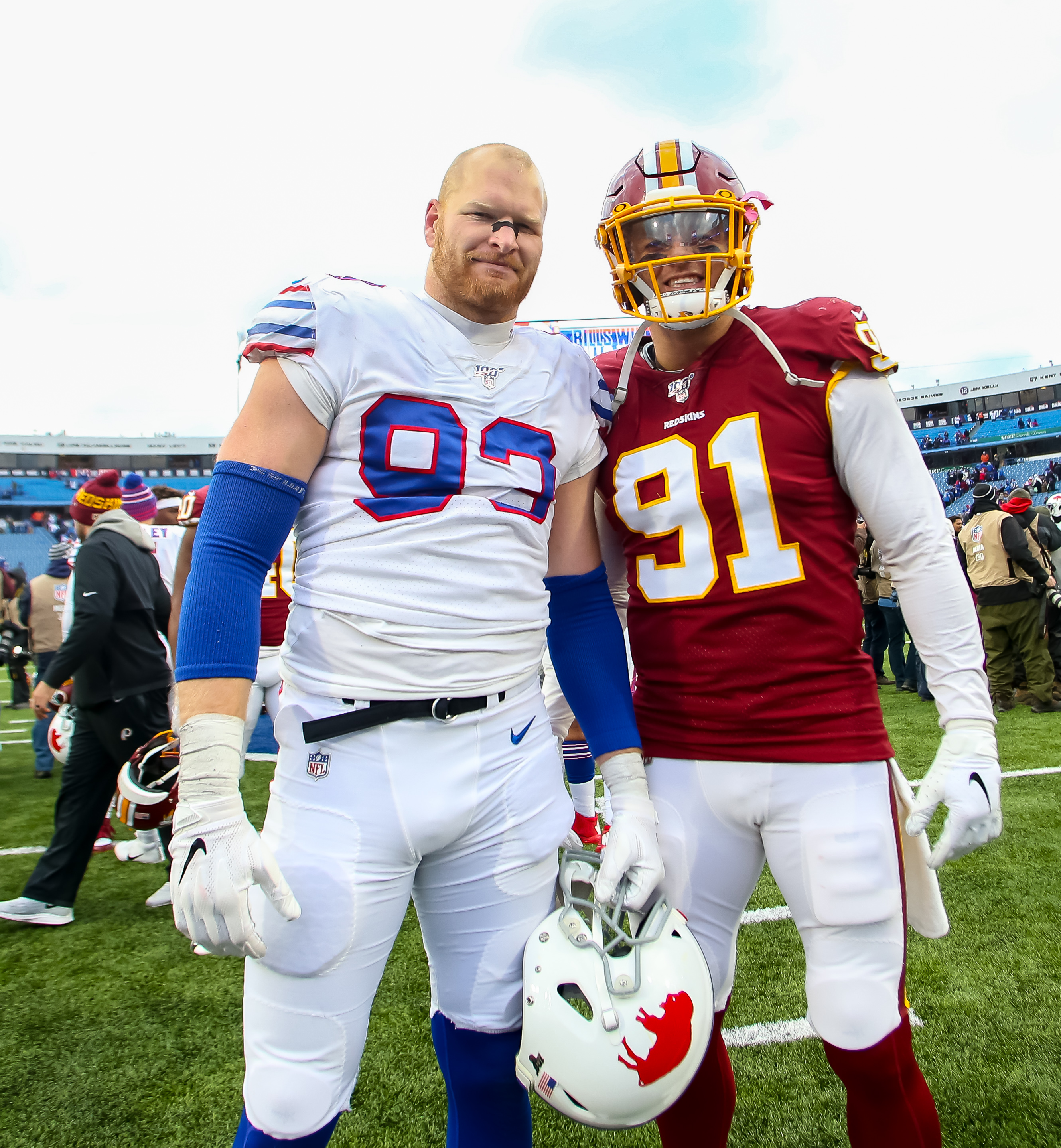
Murphy (left) and Ryan Kerrigan in 2019

On March 14, 2018, Murphy signed a three-year $22.5 million contract with the Buffalo Bills. His 2018 season was marred with continued injuries as he missed three games. In his first season with the Bills, Murphy recorded 4.0 sacks and 24 tackles, also forcing two fumbles.

In his second season with the Bills, Murphy recorded 5.0 sacks and 36 tackles, also forcing two fumbles. Murphy recorded his first career interception during Week 2 of the 2019 season, catching a tipped Eli Manning pass during a 28–14 Bills win over the Giants.

Murphy was expected to be a cap casualty in 2020, but made the team. Murphy played in 10 games, losing out on time to the slow-rising emergence of rookie A. J. Epenesa. He registered a career-low two sacks, along with 19 tackles, three for loss, and six quarterback hits. His contract was not renewed after the 2020 season and he became a free agent in 2021.

== NFL career statistics ==
Legend
**Bold**	Career high

=== Regular season ===
Year	Team	Games		Tackles					Interceptions					Fumbles			
Year	Team	GP	GS	Cmb	Solo	Ast	Sck	TFL	Int	Yds	TD	Lng	PD	FF	FR	Yds	TD
2014	WAS	15	8	32	22	10	2.5	3	0	0	0	0	1	2	1	0	0
2015	WAS	**16**	14	33	13	**20**	3.5	3	0	0	0	0	0	1	**2**	0	0
2016	WAS	**16**	0	**47**	**29**	18	**9.0**	**10**	0	0	0	0	1	**3**	1	7	0
2017	WAS	DNP															
2018	BUF	13	10	24	14	10	4.0	5	0	0	0	0	1	2	0	0	0
2019	BUF	**16**	**16**	36	24	12	5.0	9	**1**	0	0	0	**3**	2	**2**	**8**	0
2020	BUF	10	9	19	15	4	2.0	3	0	0	0	0	0	0	0	0	0
Total		86	57	191	117	74	26.0	33	1	0	0	0	6	10	6	15	0

=== Playoffs ===
Year	Team	Games		Tackles					Interceptions					Fumbles			
Year	Team	GP	GS	Cmb	Solo	Ast	Sck	TFL	Int	Yds	TD	Lng	PD	FF	FR	Yds	TD
2015	WAS	**1**	**1**	1	1	0	0.0	0	0	0	0	0	0	0	0	0	0
2019	BUF	**1**	**1**	**6**	**4**	**2**	**2.0**	**1**	0	0	0	0	0	0	0	0	0
2020	BUF	**1**	0	1	1	0	0.0	**1**	0	0	0	0	0	0	0	0	0
Total		3	2	8	6	2	2.0	2	0	0	0	0	0	0	0	0	0
