= Chase Thomas =

American football player (born 1989)

No. 58
- Position: Linebacker

Personal information
- Born: June 10, 1989 (age 37); Atlanta, Georgia, U.S.
- Listed height: 6 ft 4 in (1.93 m)
- Listed weight: 255 lb (116 kg)

Career information
- High school: Marietta (GA) Walton
- College: Stanford
- NFL draft: 2013: undrafted

Career history
- New Orleans Saints (2013)*; Oakland Raiders (2013)*; Atlanta Falcons (2013)*; Green Bay Packers (2014)*; San Francisco 49ers (2014)
- * Offseason or practice squad member only

Awards and highlights
- First-team All-American (2011); 2× First-team All-Pac-12 (2011, 2012)

Career NFL statistics
- Total tackles: 3
- Stats at Pro Football Reference

Michael Chase Thomas (born June 10, 1989) is an American former professional football player who was a linebacker in the National Football League (NFL). He played college football for the Stanford Cardinal. He was signed by the New Orleans Saints as an undrafted free agent.

== Early life ==
Thomas attended Walton High School in Marietta, Georgia. Thomas was ranked as the 26th prospect from the state of Georgia and was the 27th prospect at the outside linebacker position by Rivals.com. Thomas was also named to the All-Southeast Region for the Class of 2008 by PrepStar. He played in the Under Armour All-America Game after his senior season in high school. Thomas earned first-team all-state honors and was named the Cobb County Defensive Player of the Year following his outstanding Junior season with 82 tackles, 10 sacks and a fumble recovery.

College recruiting
Name	Hometown	School	Height	Weight	40^{‡}	Commit date
Chase Thomas; Outside linebacker	Marietta, Georgia	Walton High School	6 ft 4 in (1.93 m)	210 lb (95 kg)	4.7	Sep 22, 2007
Chase Thomas; Outside linebacker	Recruit ratings: Scout: Rivals:					
Overall recruit ranking: Scout: 81 (DE) Rivals: 27 (OLB), 26 (Georgia)
‡ Refers to 40-yard dash; Note: In many cases, Scout, Rivals, 247Sports, On3, and ESPN may conflict in their listings of height, weight and 40 time.; In these cases, the average was taken. ESPN grades are on a 100-point scale.; Sources: "2008 Stanford Football Commitments". Rivals.; "2008 Stanford Football Recruiting Commits". Scout.; "Scout.com Team Recruiting Rankings". Scout.; "2008 Team Ranking". Rivals.com.

== College career ==
Thomas was named an All-American by Sporting News in 2011 after recording 51 tackles and 8.5 sacks.

== Professional career ==
=== 2013 NFL Combine ===
Pre-draft measurables
Height	Weight	Arm length	Hand span	40-yard dash	20-yard shuttle	Three-cone drill	Vertical jump	Broad jump	Bench press
6 ft 3 in (1.91 m)	244 lb (111 kg)	32 1/4 in (0.82 m)	9 5/8 in (0.24 m)	4.91 s	4.31 s	7.17 s	32.0 in (0.81 m)	9 ft 5 in (2.87 m)	18 reps
All values from NFL Combine

=== New Orleans Saints ===
On April 27, 2013, Thomas was signed as an undrafted free agent by the New Orleans Saints. On August 19, 2013, he was waived by the Saints.

=== Oakland Raiders ===
On August 20, 2013, the Oakland Raiders claimed Chase Thomas off waivers from the Saints. On August, 31st he was waived by the Raiders.

=== Atlanta Falcons ===
He was signed to the Atlanta Falcons practice squad on September 17, 2013.

=== San Francisco 49ers ===
He signed with the San Francisco 49ers on May 27, 2014. Thomas was on the 53-member roster for weeks 10, 11, 12 and 16.
