= Stepfan Taylor =

American football player (born 1991)

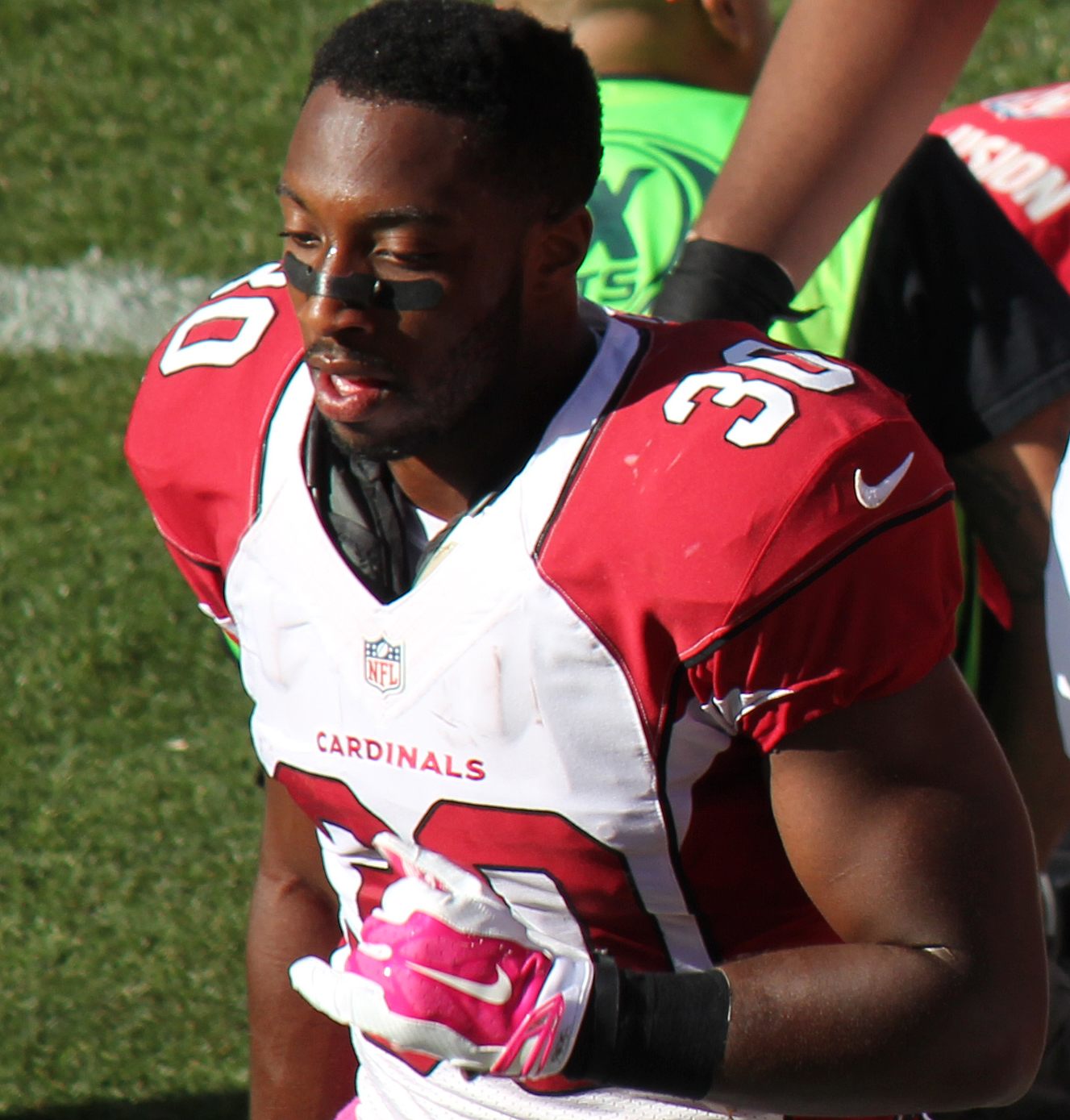
- Taylor with the Arizona Cardinals in 2014

No. 30
- Position: Running back

Personal information
- Born: June 9, 1991 (age 35); Arlington, Texas, U.S.
- Listed height: 5 ft 9 in (1.75 m)
- Listed weight: 216 lb (98 kg)

Career information
- High school: Mansfield (Mansfield, Texas)
- College: Stanford (2009–2012)
- NFL draft: 2013: 5th round, 140th overall pick

Career history
- Arizona Cardinals (2013–2016)

Awards and highlights
- Second-team All-Pac-12 (2012)

Career NFL statistics
- Rushing yards: 393
- Rushing average: 3.3
- Rushing touchdowns: 1
- Receptions: 20
- Receiving yards: 154
- Receiving touchdowns: 3
- Stats at Pro Football Reference

Stepfan Christopher Lee Taylor (born June 9, 1991) is an American former professional football player who was a running back in the National Football League (NFL). He played college football for the Stanford Cardinal, and became Stanford's all-time career leader in rushing yards and touchdowns. He was selected by the Arizona Cardinals in the fifth round of the 2013 NFL draft.

== Early life ==
Taylor rushed for a Mansfield High School (Texas) school career record of 4,792 yards and 67 rushing touchdowns during his 3-year varsity career while also lettering in basketball. He graduated from Mansfield High School as part of the class of 2009.

== College career ==
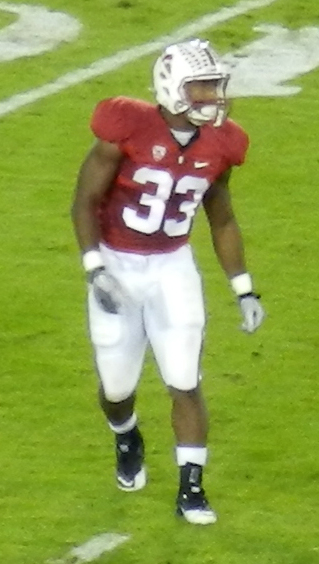
Taylor with Stanford in 2011

Taylor received an athletic scholarship to attend Stanford University, where he played for coach Jim Harbaugh and coach David Shaw's Stanford Cardinal football teams from 2009 to 2012.

=== 2009 season ===
During his freshman season, Taylor backed up Heisman contender Toby Gerhart. Taylor rushed for 303 yards and 2 touchdowns.

=== 2010 season ===
As a sophomore, Taylor won the starting running back position. He became the sixth player in Stanford history to rush for over 1,000 yards. He rushed for 1,137 yards and 15 touchdowns, while catching 28 passes for 226 yards and 1 touchdown. Taylor had 7 100-yard games, including 5 consecutive 100-yard games. He tied a school record with 4 rushing touchdowns against Arizona. Taylor ran for 114 yards in Stanford's Orange Bowl victory.

=== 2011 season ===
As a junior, Taylor recorded his second consecutive 1,000 yard season. He rushed for 1,330 yards and 10 touchdowns, while catching 25 passes for 182 yards and 2 touchdowns. Taylor's 1,330 yards were the second highest rushing total in Stanford history. Taylor's biggest game of the year came when he ran for 177 yards and 2 touchdowns in the Fiesta Bowl.

=== 2012 season ===
Taylor led Stanford to the Pac-12 championship and a victory in the Rose Bowl by rushing for 1,530 yards and 13 touchdowns. Taylor become Stanford's all-time career leader in rushing with 4,300 yards, breaking Darrin Nelson's 31-year-old school record of 4,169 yards. Taylor also set a school record with 45 career touchdowns. He ran for 100 or more yards in 8 of the 12 regular season games. Taylor was second on the team in receptions with 41 catches for 287 yards, with 2 touchdown catches.

In Week 3 of the season, Taylor was named the Walter Camp Offensive Player of the Week and Pac-12 Offensive Player of the Week for his performance in # 20 Stanford's upset of the # 2 USC Trojans in which he rushed 27 times for 153 yards and a touchdown and caught five passes for 60 yards and a score. He ran for a career-high 189 yards against Cal to lead Stanford to a 21–3 victory in the 115th Big Game. On November 17, Taylor ran for 161 yards in Stanford's upset victory over # 1 Oregon in Eugene. The following week, Taylor won the Pac-12 Offensive Player of the Week award again for his performance against UCLA, when he ran for 142 yards and 2 touchdowns while playing only two and a half quarters. He broke Nelson's career rushing record and tied Gerhart's career touchdown record in the Pac-12 championship game against UCLA. Taylor was named the Offensive Player of the Game in the Rose Bowl after rushing for 88 yards and a touchdown.

== Professional career ==
Taylor was selected by the Arizona Cardinals in the fifth round, 140th overall, in the 2013 NFL draft.

Taylor played sparingly in 2013, as he was behind Andre Ellington and Rashard Mendenhall on the depth chart. He finished his rookie season with 115 yards on 36 carries (3.2 avg), while catching 8 passes for 71 yards.

Taylor had an increased role in the Arizona offense in 2014, taking on the no. 2 spot behind Ellington. Due to an unhealthy Ellington, Taylor started four games and racked up four touchdowns (one rushing, three receiving) in 2014.

Taylor played sporadically in 2015, being at the bottom of the depth chart in a running back group that featured not only Andre Ellington, but now pro bowler Chris Johnson and rookie sensation David Johnson. In 2015, he had career lows in rushing attempts (17) and rushing yards (58), while putting up one reception for four yards and no touchdowns.

== Career statistics ==
=== NFL ===
| Season | Rushing | | | | | Receiving | | | | |
| Season | Att | Yds | Avg | Lng | TD | Rec | Yds | Avg | Lng | TD |
|---|---|---|---|---|---|---|---|---|---|---|
| 2013 | 36 | 115 | 3.2 | 15 | 0 | 8 | 71 | 8.9 | 29 | 0 |
| 2014 | 63 | 208 | 3.3 | 21 | 1 | 11 | 79 | 7.2 | 18 | 3 |
| 2015 | 17 | 58 | 3.4 | 16 | 0 | 1 | 4 | 4.0 | 4 | 0 |
| 2016 | 4 | 12 | 3.0 | 12 | 0 | 0 | 0 | 0 | 0 | 0 |
| Total | 120 | 393 | 3.3 | 21 | 1 | 20 | 154 | 7.7 | 29 | 3 |

=== College ===
| Season | Rushing | | | | | Receiving | | | | |
| Season | Att | Yds | Avg | Lng | TD | Rec | Yds | Avg | Lng | TD |
|---|---|---|---|---|---|---|---|---|---|---|
| 2009 | 56 | 303 | 5.4 | 33 | 2 | 3 | 43 | 14.3 | 23 | 0 |
| 2010 | 223 | 1,137 | 5.1 | 62 | 15 | 28 | 266 | 9.5 | 59 | 1 |
| 2011 | 242 | 1,330 | 5.5 | 70 | 10 | 25 | 182 | 7.3 | 27 | 2 |
| 2012 | 322 | 1,530 | 4.8 | 59 | 13 | 41 | 287 | 7.0 | 40 | 2 |
| Total | 843 | 4,300 | 5.1 | 70 | 40 | 97 | 778 | 8.0 | 59 | 5 |

== Career highlights ==
=== Awards and honors ===
- 2013 Rose Bowl Offensive Player of the Game
- 2012 Second-team All-America (Athlon), Third-team All-America (CBSsports.com, Lindy's)
- 2012 Doak Walker Award semi-finalist
- 2012 Second-team All-Pac-12
- Pac-12 Offensive Player of the Week, two times (September 17, 2012; November 26, 2012)
- 2012 Walter Camp Offensive Player of the Week (week ending September 16, 2012)
- 2012 Stanford Cardinal MVP (Irving S. Zeimer Award)
- 2011 Second-team All-Pac-12
- 2010 Honorable Mention All-Pac-10

=== Records ===
Stanford career records

- Most career rushing yards (4,300)
- Most career touchdowns (45)
- Most career 100 yard rushing games (21)
- Most 1,000 yard rushing seasons (3) (tied)

Stanford single game records

- Most rushing touchdowns in a game (4) (tied)
