= 2013 Rose Bowl =

American college football game

2013 Rose Bowl presented by Vizio
- 99th Rose Bowl Game
Wisconsin Badgers	Stanford Cardinal
(8–5)	(11–2)
Big Ten	Pac-12
14	20
Head coach: Barry Alvarez (interim)	Head coach: David Shaw
AP / Coaches / BCS; NR / 23 / NR	AP / Coaches / BCS; 8 / 8 / 6
	1	2	3	4	Total
Wisconsin	0	14	0	0	14
Stanford	14	3	0	3	20
- Date: January 1, 2013
- Season: 2012
- Stadium: Rose Bowl
- Location: Pasadena, California
- MVP: Offense: Stepfan Taylor (RB, Stanford); Defense: Usua Amanam (CB, Stanford)
- Favorite: Stanford by 6.5
- National anthem: Stanford Band
- Referee: Jerry McGinn (Big East)
- Halftime show: Stanford Band; University of Wisconsin Marching Band
- Attendance: 93,359
- Payout: US$36 million per team

United States TV coverage
- Network: ESPN
- Announcers: Brent Musburger (play-by-play); Kirk Herbstreit (analyst); Heather Cox and Tom Rinaldi (sideline) (ESPN)
- Nielsen ratings: 9.6 (17 Million viewers)

International TV coverage
- Network: ESPN Deportes
- Announcers: Georgina Ruiz Sandoval; Robert Abramowitz

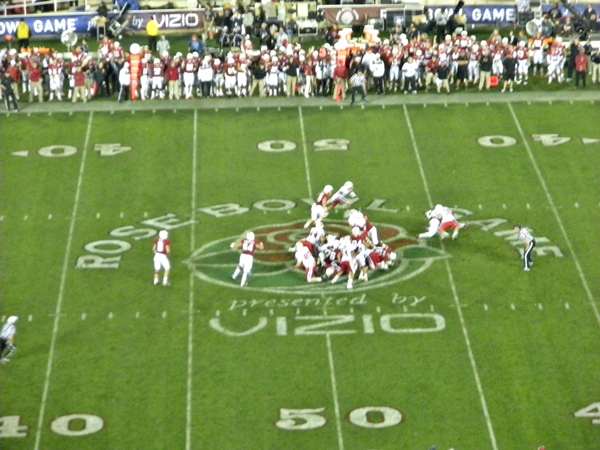
The 2013 Rose Bowl during the game.

The 2013 Rose Bowl, the 99th edition of the annual game, was a college football bowl game played on Tuesday, January 1, 2013, at the same-named stadium in Pasadena, California. The Pasadena Tournament of Roses Association is the organizer of the game. The game matched Big Ten Conference Champions Wisconsin Badgers against the Pac-12 Conference Champions Stanford Cardinal, a rematch of the same two teams in the 2000 Rose Bowl. The Cardinal defeated the Badgers 20–14 for the Rose Bowl Championship. This was Wisconsin's third consecutive Rose Bowl defeat.

Because of sponsorship by Vizio, the first game in the 2013 edition of the Bowl Championship Series was officially titled the Rose Bowl Game presented by Vizio. The contest was televised on ESPN with a radio broadcast on ESPN Radio and XM Satellite Radio, which began at 1:30 p.m. (PST) with kickoff at 2:10 p.m. (PST).

The Rose Bowl Game, themed "Oh, the Places You'll Go!", was a contractual sell-out, with 64,500 tickets allocated to the participating teams and conferences. The remaining tickets went to the Tournament of Roses members, sponsors, City of Pasadena residents, and the general public.

== Pre-game activities ==
The game was presided over by the 2013 Rose Queen Vanessa Manjarrez, the Royal Court (Madison Teodo, Sonia Shenoi, Kathryne Benuska, Nicole Nelam, Tracy Cresta, and Victoria McGregor), Tournament of Roses president Sally Bixby, and grand marshal Jane Goodall.

After the teams' arrival in Southern California, the teams participated in the traditional Lawry's Beef Bowl in Beverly Hills and the Disney Media Day at Disneyland in nearby Anaheim. The Rose Bowl Hall of Fame ceremony luncheon was held prior to the game at the Pasadena Convention Center.

The bands and cheerleaders from both schools participated in the pre-game Rose Parade on Colorado Boulevard in Pasadena, California along with the floats.

A USAF B-2 of the 509th Bomb Wing at Whiteman Air Force Base performed a fly-over at the end of the National Anthem before the game.

== Teams ==
Teams playing in the Rose Bowl game are typically the winners of the Pac-12 and Big Ten conferences (each of which currently determines this by means of a conference championship game), unless one team (or both teams) plays in the BCS National Championship game. The teams were officially selected by the football committee of the Pasadena Tournament of Roses Association on Selection Sunday on December 2, 2012. Also former ABC college football announcer Keith Jackson announced the Rose Bowl Hall of Fame Class of 2012 inductees John Cooper, Brian Griese and Ron Yary. Both teams held their pre-game practices at the Home Depot Center in Carson, California. Prior to the game, the two teams had met five times with the Badgers leading the series 4–0–1.

=== Stanford ===
Stanford, representing the North Division in the Pac-12 Football Championship Game, defeated UCLA, the South Division Champions 27–24 to earn a trip to Pasadena. The Cardinal last played in the 2000 Rose Bowl, also against the Wisconsin Badgers, losing 17–9.

The Cardinal led the Pac-12 Conference in scoring defense (17.5 per game), rushing defense (87.7 yards per game), sacks (56), and kickoff coverage. Running back Stepfan Taylor rushed 302 times for 1442 yards with 12 touchdowns, averaging 110.9 yards per game.

=== Wisconsin ===
The Wisconsin Badgers, representing the Leaders Division in the 2012 Big Ten Championship Game, defeated the Nebraska Cornhuskers, the Legends Division Champions 70–31 to earn their third consecutive trip to the game. Wisconsin lost to the TCU Horned Frogs 21–19 in 2011 and to the Oregon Ducks 45–38 in 2012. Head coach Bret Bielema accepted the head coaching position at Arkansas prior to the game. Wisconsin was coached in the Rose Bowl by Bielema's predecessor and former athletic director Barry Alvarez, a member of both the Rose Bowl Hall of Fame and the College Football Hall of Fame. He was the coach of the 1999 Wisconsin Badgers football team that defeated Stanford in the 2000 Rose Bowl and, prior to this game, had never lost a Rose Bowl (3–0).

Running back Montee Ball rushed for 1,730 yards and 21 touchdowns on the season. He had nine 100-yard rushing games including two 200-yard rushing performances this season. His career 76 rushing touchdowns and 82 total touchdowns are both NCAA Football Bowl Subdivision records, and his 25 career games with multiple touchdowns equals the previous FBS record of Travis Prentice (who was also the prior holder of the two records broken by Ball). Ball is the 2012 Doak Walker Award winner.

== Game summary ==
=== Scoring ===
Stanford 20 Wisconsin 14

==== First quarter ====
- Stanford – Kelsey Young 16-yard run (Jordan Williamson kick), 11:24
- Stanford – Stepfan Taylor 3-yard run (Williamson kick), 6:35

==== Second quarter ====
- Wisconsin – Montee Ball 11-yard run (Jack Russell kick), 9:05
- Stanford – Williamson 47-yard field goal, 6:19
- Wisconsin – Jordan Fredrick 4-yard pass from Curt Phillips (Russell kick), :19

==== Third quarter ====
- None.

==== Fourth quarter ====
- Stanford – Williamson 22-yard field goal, 4:23

=== Statistics ===
Statistics	WIS	STAN
First downs	17	17
Total offense, plays – yards	69–301	55–344
Rushes-yards (net)	45–218	35–187
Passing yards (net)	83	157
Passes, Comp-Att-Int	10–17–1	13–20–0
Time of Possession	29:52	30:08

== Game notes ==
- Phase two of the Rose Bowl renovation was completed in 2012 with one half of the press box and premium suites available for the game.
- Wisconsin running back Montee Ball became the first player in Rose Bowl Game history to score a touchdown in three straight years.
- No touchdown scored in the second half for the first time since 1958, when Ohio State defeated Oregon, 10–7. (The last first half without a TD was in 2007, when USC and Michigan were tied, 3–3.)
- Players of the game: Offense - RB (#33), Stepfan Taylor Sr., Stanford, 20-89, 1 TD rushing (10 long), 3-17 receiving (12 long); Defense - DB (#15), Usua Amanam Jr., Stanford, 3 TT/2 UT; 1 interception (on UW's final position at Stan 42)
- Stanford head coach David Shaw became the first African-American head coach to win a Rose Bowl, as well as a BCS game.

== Related events ==
- Selection Sunday, December 2, 2012
- Lawry's Beef Bowl – December 27, 28, 2012
- Hall of Fame ceremony, Pasadena Convention Center, December 30, 2012
- Kickoff Luncheon, Rose Bowl, December 31, 2012
- Rose Bowl Game Public Tailgate, January 1, 2013
