= David Shaw (American football) =

American football player, coach, and executive (born 1972)

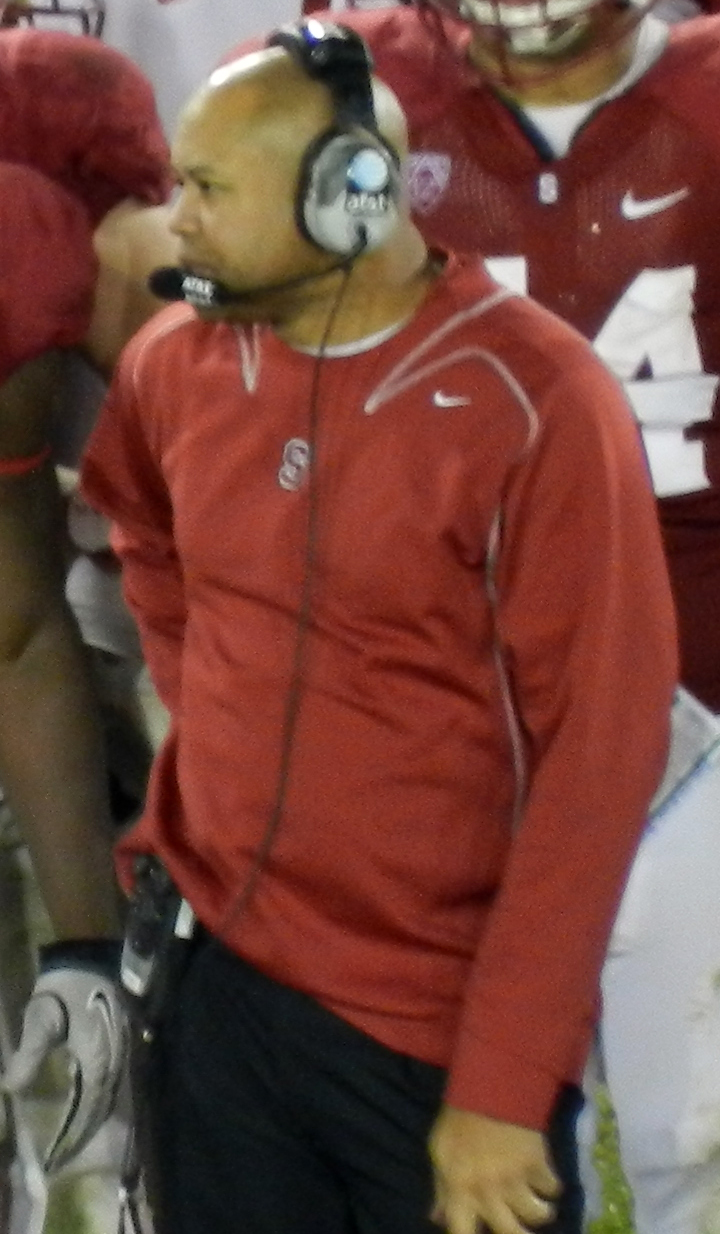

Detroit Lions
- Title: Passing game specialist

Personal information
- Born: July 31, 1972 (age 54); San Diego, California, U.S.

Career information
- Position: Wide receiver
- High school: Union City (CA) Logan
- College: Stanford (1991–1994)

Career history

Coaching
- Western Washington (1995-1996); Outside linebackers coach (1995); Tight ends coach (1996); Philadelphia Eagles (1997) Offensive quality control coach; Oakland Raiders (1998–2001); Offensive quality control coach (1998-2000); Quarterbacks coach (2001); Baltimore Ravens (2002–2005); Quarterbacks & wide receivers coach (2002-2004); Wide receivers coach (2005); San Diego (2006) Passing game coordinator & wide receivers coach; Stanford (2007–2022); Offensive coordinator & wide receivers coach (2007-2009); Offensive coordinator & running backs coach (2010); Head coach (2011-2022); Detroit Lions (2025-present); Passing game coordinator (2025); Passing game specialist (2026-present)

Operations
- Denver Broncos (2024) Senior personnel executive

Awards and highlights
- 3× Pac-12 (2012, 2013, 2015); 5× Pac-12 North Division (2011–13, 2015, 2017); Bobby Dodd Coach of the Year (2017); 4× Pac-12 Coach of the Year (2011, 2012, 2015, 2017)

Head coaching record
- Career: NCAA: 96–54 (.640); Bowls: 5–3 (.625)

David Lorenzo Shaw (born July 31, 1972) is an American football coach who is currently the passing game specialist for the Detroit Lions of the National Football League (NFL). He served as head coach of the Stanford Cardinal football team from 2011 to 2022. Shaw was the team's offensive coordinator for the entire tenure of his predecessor, head coach Jim Harbaugh, from 2007 to 2010. Previously, Shaw was a four-year letter winner as a wide receiver for the Cardinal from 1991 to 1994, where he was coached by Dennis Green and Bill Walsh. Prior to returning to Stanford as offensive coordinator, Shaw was Harbaugh's passing game coordinator at the University of San Diego and an assistant coach in the NFL for the Philadelphia Eagles, Oakland Raiders, and Baltimore Ravens. Shaw resigned as the Stanford head coach on November 27, 2022. In 2024, Shaw served as a senior personnel executive for the Denver Broncos.

== Early life and playing career ==
Shaw was born in San Diego, California and moved with his family around the country following his father Willie's career as an NFL coach. Shaw played high school football at Rochester Adams High School in Rochester Hills, Michigan while his father coached for the Detroit Lions.

In 1989, Willie accepted a coaching job at Stanford University and the family moved back to the Bay Area where David ultimately graduated from James Logan High School in Union City, California.

He went on to attend Stanford University, where he played college football as a wide receiver under head coaches Dennis Green and Bill Walsh. In his college career from 1991 to 1994, Shaw caught 57 passes for 664 yards and five touchdowns. Shaw was also on the Stanford men's basketball and track teams before earning a B.A. in sociology in 1995.

== NFL assistant coach ==
His coaching career began at Western Washington University in 1995. In 1997, Shaw began a nine-year run as an NFL assistant coach with stints for the Philadelphia Eagles, Oakland Raiders, and Baltimore Ravens.

As the Raiders' quality control from 1998 to 2000 and quarterbacks coach in 2001, the team won two consecutive AFC West titles and completed a 10–6 regular season.

Shaw was the quarterbacks coach for the Baltimore Ravens from 2002 to 2004 and wide receivers coach for the Ravens from 2002 to 2005, with the 2003 team finishing with a 10–6 regular season mark and winning the AFC North. In 2005, Shaw coached wide receivers Derrick Mason to a Ravens record of 86 receptions and 1,073 receiving yards (the third-highest Baltimore record) and Mark Clayton to a Ravens rookie record of 44 receptions for 471 yards.

== College assistant coach ==
In 2006, Shaw left the NFL for the University of San Diego to join head coach Jim Harbaugh's staff as passing game coordinator. The 11–1 Toreros' offense led the NCAA Division I-AA in many statistical categories, including passing offense (293.3 ypg), total offense (494.25 ypg), and scoring offense (42.83 ppg).

When Harbaugh was hired as head coach of Shaw's alma mater, Stanford, in 2007, he brought Shaw as offensive coordinator. During his years as an assistant coach, Shaw also coached the Cardinal wide receivers and running backs.

Shaw's unit performed successfully during his years as coordinator, led by 2010 Heisman Trophy runner-up Andrew Luck. They scored at least 40 points in 11 different games with Shaw as offensive coordinator, including 10 times in the 2009 and 2010 seasons. The Cardinal achieved a school-record 461 points in 2009 and broke the record again the following season with 524 points.

Despite the graduation of 2009 Heisman Trophy runner-up Toby Gerhart, during Stanford's 2010 season when Shaw took over as running backs coach, the Cardinal running game was second in the conference and 17th in the nation with an average of 213.77 yards and a total of 2,779 yards, Stanford's second-highest rushing total ever.

== Stanford head coach ==
In January 2011, Shaw was promoted to head coach after Harbaugh left to become head coach of the NFL's San Francisco 49ers over numerous other offers, including a hefty salary with the Miami Dolphins. Shaw is the first Stanford alumnus to serve as head football coach since Paul Wiggin, who coached Stanford from 1980 to 1983.

In his first three seasons, Shaw led the team to three consecutive BCS bowl games, including two Rose Bowls. Shaw led the team to a Rose Bowl victory over Wisconsin. The team returned to the Rose Bowl again the following year in the 2013 season, but lost a heart-breaker to Michigan State.

After a rebuilding season in 2014, the 2015 season saw Shaw lead Stanford to its third Pac-12 championship in four years, and consequently, its third Rose Bowl in four years, which the team won 45–16 over the Iowa Hawkeyes. With the 2015 conference title, Shaw became the first Stanford coach in 80 years to win three conference titles and only the third ever in program history (after Tiny Thornhill from 1933 to 1935 and Pop Warner in 1924, 1926, and 1927). With the Rose Bowl victory over Iowa, Shaw became only the second Stanford coach to win two Rose Bowls (after John Ralston who won the 1971 and 1972 Rose Bowls). That victory also resulted in Stanford being ranked #3 in the final Coaches Poll, their highest final ranking in the history of that poll. They were similarly ranked #3 in the final AP Poll, their highest final ranking in 75 years, following the 1940 national championship season.

With a win over Cal in the 2017 Big Game at Stanford Stadium, Shaw set a new Stanford record for most wins by a football head coach (72 wins), breaking the record previously held by Pop Warner (71 wins from 1924 to 1932). After going undefeated in the Big Game in Shaw's first eight seasons, Stanford lost the 2019, 2021 and 2022 Big Games at Stanford Stadium to bring Shaw's record to 9–3 against Cal.

== Executive career ==
On June 20, 2024, Shaw was named the Senior Personnel Executive for the Denver Broncos. In January 2025, Shaw returned to coaching as the Passing Game Coordinator for the Detroit Lions.

== Personal life ==
His father, Willie, was a Stanford assistant coach under Jack Christiansen from 1974 to 1976 and Dennis Green from 1989 to 1991, and an NFL assistant coach with the Detroit Lions, Kansas City Chiefs, Minnesota Vikings, New Orleans Saints, Oakland Raiders, San Diego Chargers, and St. Louis Rams. Willie Shaw was a finalist for Stanford's head football coach position in 1992 that eventually went to Bill Walsh.

== Head coaching record ==
| Year | Team | Overall | Conference | Standing | Bowl/playoffs | Coaches^{#} | AP^{°} |
|---|---|---|---|---|---|---|---|
Stanford Cardinal (Pac-12 Conference) (2011–2022)
| 2011 | Stanford | 11–2 | 8–1 | T–1st (North) | L Fiesta^{†} | 7 | 7 |
| 2012 | Stanford | 12–2 | 8–1 | T–1st (North) | W Rose^{†} | 6 | 7 |
| 2013 | Stanford | 11–3 | 7–2 | T–1st (North) | L Rose^{†} | 10 | 11 |
| 2014 | Stanford | 8–5 | 5–4 | 2nd (North) | W Foster Farms | | |
| 2015 | Stanford | 12–2 | 8–1 | 1st (North) | W Rose^{†} | 3 | 3 |
| 2016 | Stanford | 10–3 | 6–3 | 3rd (North) | W Sun | 12 | 12 |
| 2017 | Stanford | 9–5 | 7–2 | T–1st (North) | L Alamo | 19 | 20 |
| 2018 | Stanford | 9–4 | 6–3 | 3rd (North) | W Sun | | |
| 2019 | Stanford | 4–8 | 3–6 | T–5th (North) | | | |
| 2020 | Stanford | 4–2 | 4–2 | 3rd (North) | | | |
| 2021 | Stanford | 3–9 | 2–7 | 6th (North) | | | |
| 2022 | Stanford | 3–9 | 1–8 | T–11th | | | |
| Stanford: | | 96–54 | 65–40 | | | | |
| Total: | | 96–54 | | | | | |
National championship Conference title Conference division title or championship game berth
^{†}Indicates BCS or CFP / New Years' Six bowl.; ^{#}Rankings from final Coaches Poll.; ^{°}Rankings from final AP Poll.
