= 2012 Nevada Wolf Pack football team =

American college football season

2012 Nevada Wolf Pack football

New Mexico Bowl, L 48–49 vs. Arizona
- Conference: Mountain West Conference
- Record: 7–6 (4–4 MW)
- Head coach: Chris Ault (28th season)
- Offensive coordinator: Nick Rolovich (1st season)
- Offensive scheme: Pistol
- Defensive coordinator: Mike Bradeson (1st season)
- Base defense: 4–3
- Home stadium: Mackay Stadium

2012 Mountain West Conference football standings
	Conf.			Overall
Team	W		L	W		L
No. 18 Boise State +	7	–	1	11	–	2
Fresno State +	7	–	1	9	–	4
San Diego State +	7	–	1	9	–	4
Air Force	5	–	3	6	–	7
Nevada	4	–	4	7	–	6
Wyoming	3	–	5	4	–	8
Colorado State	3	–	5	4	–	8
UNLV	2	–	6	2	–	11
New Mexico	1	–	7	4	–	9
Hawaii	1	–	7	3	–	9
+ – Conference co-champions; Rankings from AP Poll

The 2012 Nevada Wolf Pack football team represented the University of Nevada, Reno in the 2012 NCAA Division I FBS football season. The Wolf Pack were led by Chris Ault in his 28th overall and 9th straight season since taking over as head coach for the third time in 2004 and later resigned from coaching at the end of the season. They played their home games at Mackay Stadium and were first–year members of the Mountain West Conference. They finished the season 7–6 and 4–4 in Mountain West play to finish in fifth place. They were invited to the New Mexico Bowl where they lost to Arizona.

== Schedule ==
Date	Time	Opponent	Site	TV	Result	Attendance
September 1	12:00 p.m.	at California*	California Memorial Stadium; Berkeley, CA	P12N	W 31–24	63,186
September 8	12:30 p.m.	South Florida*	Mackay Stadium; Reno, NV	CBSSN	L 31–32	22,804
September 15	4:00 p.m.	Northwestern State*	Mackay Stadium; Reno, NV		W 45–34	19,399
September 22	7:30 p.m.	at Hawaii	Aloha Stadium; Halawa, HI	NBCSN	W 69–24	31,417
September 29	11:00 a.m.	at Texas State*	Bobcat Stadium; San Marcos, TX	LHN	W 34–21	14,210
October 6	4:00 p.m.	Wyoming^{†}	Mackay Stadium; Reno, NV	Campus Insiders	W 35–28 ^{OT}	24,025
October 13	12:00 p.m.	at UNLV	Sam Boyd Stadium; Whitney, NV (Fremont Cannon)	TWCSN/Charter	W 42–37	20,565
October 20	7:30 p.m.	San Diego State	Mackay Stadium; Reno, NV	CBSSN	L 38–39 ^{OT}	22,242
October 26	5:00 p.m.	at Air Force	Falcon Stadium; Colorado Springs, CO	CBSSN	L 31–48	24,277
November 10	7:30 p.m.	Fresno State	Mackay Stadium; Reno, NV	NBCSN	L 36–52	22,104
November 17	12:30 p.m.	at New Mexico	University Stadium; Albuquerque, NM	Charter/Comcast	W 31–24	17,290
December 1	12:30 p.m.	No. 25 Boise State	Mackay Stadium; Reno, NV (rivalry)	ABC	L 21–27	30,017
December 15	10:00 a.m.	vs. Arizona*	University Stadium; Albuquerque, NM (New Mexico Bowl)	ESPN	L 48–49	24,610
*Non-conference game; ^{†}Homecoming; Rankings from AP Poll released prior to the game; All times are in Pacific time

== Rankings ==
Ranking movements Legend: ██ Increase in ranking ██ Decrease in ranking — = Not ranked RV = Received votes
	Week															
Poll	Pre	1	2	3	4	5	6	7	8	9	10	11	12	13	14	Final
AP	—	—	—	—	—	—	—	—	—	—	—	—	—	—	—	—
Coaches	—	RV	RV	—	—	—	RV	—	—	—	—	—	—	—	—	—
Harris	Not released						RV	RV	RV	—	—	—	—	—	—	Not released
BCS	Not released							—	—	—	—	—	—	—	—	Not released

== Preseason ==
=== Mountain West media days ===
The Mountain West media days were held on July 24–26, 2012, at the Cosmopolitan in Paradise, Nevada.

=== Media poll ===
The preseason poll was released on July 24, 2012. The Wolf Pack were predicted to finish in second place.

=== Preseason All–Mountain West Team ===
The Wolf Pack had four players selected to the preseason All–Mountain West Team; three from the offense and one from the defense.

Offense

Stefphon Jefferson – RB

Brandon Wimberly – WR

Jeff Nady – OL

Defense

Albert Rosette – LB

== Game summaries ==
=== At California ===
Nevada at California

Team	1	2	3	4	Total
• Wolf Pack	14	0	7	10	31
Golden Bears	0	7	10	7	24

- Date: September 1, 2012
- Location: California Memorial Stadium
  Berkeley, CA
- Game start: 12:08 p.m. PDT
- Elapsed time: 3 hours and 24 minutes
- Game attendance: 63,186
- Game weather: Temperature: 60 °F (16 °C) • Weather: Clear • Wind: W 2–4 MPH
- Referee: Terry Leyden
- TV announcers (P12N): Dave Flemming (play–by–play), Coy Wire (analyst) and Brooke Olzendam (sideline)

Scoring summary
1	04:34	NEV	Stefphon Jefferson 2–yard run (Allen Hardison kick) (16 plays, 80 yards, 6:13)	NEV 7–0
1	00:00	NEV	Cody Fajardo 49–yard run (Allen Hardison kick) (2 plays, 60 yards, 0:26)	NEV 14–0
2	04:38	CAL	Bryce Treggs 37–yard pass from Zach Maynard (Vincenzo D'Amato kick) (6 plays, 77 yards, 2:39)	NEV 14–7
3	06:20	NEV	Stefphon Jefferson 2–yard run (Allen Hardison kick) (12 plays, 79 yards, 4:41)	NEV 21–7
3	05:39	CAL	Keenan Allen 39–yard run (Vincenzo D'Amato kick) (2 plays, 51 yards, 0:44)	NEV 21–14
3	04:38	CAL	Vincenzo D'Amato 40–yard field goal (4 plays, 4 yards, 0:53)	NEV 21–17
4	08:46	NEV	Allen Hardison 39–yard field goal (14 plays, 57 yards, 4:55)	NEV 24–17
4	07:24	CAL	Chris Harper 13–yard pass from Zach Maynard (Vincenzo D'Amato kick) (5 plays, 61 yards, 1:16)	TIE 24–24
4	00:36	NEV	Stefphon Jefferson 2–yard run (Allen Hardison kick) (9 plays, 61 yards, 2:48)	NEV 31–24

Statistics	Nevada	California
First downs	27	21
Total yards	450	364
Rushing yards	220	113
Passing yards	230	251
Turnovers	7	5
Time of possession	35:06	24:54

Team	Category	Player	Statistics
Nevada	Passing	Cody Fajardo	25/32, 230 yards
Nevada	Rushing	Stefphon Jefferson	34 carries, 147 yards, 3 TDs
Nevada	Receiving	Brandon Wimberly	7 receptions, 83 yards
California	Passing	Zach Maynard	17/30, 245 yards, 2 TDs
California	Rushing	C. J. Anderson	14 carries, 66 yards
California	Receiving	Keenan Allen	6 receptions, 67 yards

=== South Florida ===
South Florida at Nevada

Team	1	2	3	4	Total
• Bulls	6	7	7	12	32
Wolf Pack	21	0	7	3	31

- Date: September 8, 2012
- Location: Mackay Stadium
  Reno, NV
- Game start: 12:35 p.m. PDT
- Elapsed time: 3 hours and 48 minutes
- Game attendance: 22,804
- Game weather: Temperature: 81 °F (27 °C) • Weather: Sunny • Wind: WSW 1 MPH
- Referee: Jeff Maconaghy
- TV announcers (CBSSN): James Bates (play–by–play), Aaron Taylor (analyst) and Lauren Gardner (sideline)

Scoring summary
1	10:40	NEV	Zach Sudfeld 0–yard fumble recovery (Allen Hardison kick)	NEV 7–0
1	06:29	NEV	Cody Fajardo 1–yard run (Allen Hardison kick) (7 plays, 58 yards, 2:44)	NEV 14–0
1	05:19	USF	Andre Davis 51–yard pass from B. J. Daniels (Maikon Bonani kick failed) (4 plays, 81 yards, 1:05)	NEV 14–6
1	02:58	NEV	Joseph Huber 29–yard pass from Cody Fajardo (Allen Hardison kick) (5 plays, 75 yards, 2:21)	NEV 21–6
2	09:12	USF	Demetris Murray 1–yard run (Maikon Bonani kick) (8 plays, 73 yards, 3:27)	NEV 21–13
3	12:56	USF	Lindsey Lamar 35–yard run (Maikon Bonani kick) (7 plays, 75 yards, 2:04)	NEV 21–20
3	00:00	NEV	Cody Fajardo 14–yard run (Allen Hardison kick) (9 plays, 82 yards, 2:41)	NEV 28–20
4	08:16	NEV	Allen Hardison 35–yard field goal (14 plays, 62 yards, 5:17)	NEV 31–20
4	02:37	USF	Chris Dunkley 52–yard pass from B. J. Daniels (pass failed) (7 plays, 80 yards, 1:54)	NEV 31–26
4	00:38	USF	Andre Davis 56–yard pass from B. J. Daniels (pass failed) (6 plays, 92 yards, 1:00)	USF 32–31

Statistics	South Florida	Nevada
First downs	26	30
Total yards	572	549
Rushing yards	209	278
Passing yards	363	271
Turnovers	2	7
Time of possession	26:20	33:40

Team	Category	Player	Statistics
South Florida	Passing	B. J. Daniels	22/40, 363 yards, 3 TDs
South Florida	Rushing	Lindsey Lamar	8 carries, 85 yards, 1 TD
South Florida	Receiving	Andre Davis	12 receptions, 191 yards, 2 TDs
Nevada	Passing	Cody Fajardo	27/38, 271 yards, 1 TD
Nevada	Rushing	Stefphon Jefferson	30 carries, 135 yards
Nevada	Receiving	Zach Sudfeld	5 receptions, 67 yards

=== Northwestern State ===
Northwestern State at Nevada

Team	1	2	3	4	Total
Demons (Div. I FCS)	3	10	7	14	34
• Wolf Pack	7	10	14	14	45

- Date: September 15, 2012
- Location: Mackay Stadium
  Reno, NV
- Game start: 4:05 p.m. PDT
- Elapsed time: 3 hours and 31 minutes
- Game attendance: 19,399
- Game weather: Temperature: 88 °F (31 °C) • Weather: Hot and Sunny • Wind: WSW 17 MPH
- Referee: Tom Walker
- TV announcers (None): None

Scoring summary
1	10:27	NWLA	John Shaughnessy 22–yard field goal (10 plays, 25 yards, 3:10)	NWLA 3–0
1	04:44	NEV	Cody Fajardo 2–yard run (Allen Hardison kick) (6 plays, 46 yards, 1:51)	NEV 7–3
2	11:39	NEV	Allen Hardison 29–yard field goal (4 plays, 8 yards, 1:27)	NEV 10–3
2	05:20	NWLA	Corey Simmons 2–yard pass from Brad Henderson (John Shaughnessy kick) (7 plays, 71 yards, 2:32)	TIE 10–10
2	00:49	NWLA	John Shaughnessy 34–yard field goal (11 plays, 80 yards, 2:51)	NWLA 13–10
2	00:04	NEV	Zach Sudfeld 25–yard pass from Cody Fajardo (Allen Hardison kick) (5 plays, 75 yards, 0:45)	NEV 17–13
3	10:42	NEV	Stefphon Jefferson 48–yard run (Allen Hardison kick) (1 play, 48 yards, 0:09)	NEV 24–13
3	06:30	NWLA	Sidney Riley 4–yard run (John Shaughnessy kick) (11 plays, 75 yards, 4:12)	NEV 24–20
3	02:18	NEV	Cody Fajardo 10–yard run (Allen Hardison kick) (12 plays, 82 yards, 4:07)	NEV 31–20
4	12:07	NEV	Stefphon Jefferson 52–yard run (Allen Hardison kick) (6 plays, 76 yards, 2:09)	NEV 38–20
4	09:18	NWLA	Daniel Taylor 40–yard run (John Shaughnessy kick) (7 plays, 78 yards, 2:43)	NEV 38–27
4	06:13	NEV	Cody Fajardo 22–yard run (Allen Hardison kick) (9 plays, 80 yards, 2:59)	NEV 45–27
4	05:35	NWLA	Phillip Harvey 68–yard pass from Brad Henderson (John Shaughnessy kick) (3 plays, 78 yards, 0:33)	NEV 45–34

Statistics	Northwestern State	Nevada
First downs	31	37
Total yards	585	655
Rushing yards	228	418
Passing yards	357	237
Turnovers	5	1
Time of possession	31:52	28:08

Team	Category	Player	Statistics
Northwestern State	Passing	Brad Henderson	28/53, 357 yards, 2 TDs
Northwestern State	Rushing	Brad Henderson	11 carries, 102 yards
Northwestern State	Receiving	Louis Hollier	8 receptions, 107 yards
Nevada	Passing	Cody Fajardo	21/33, 237 yards, 1 TD, 1 INT
Nevada	Rushing	Stefphon Jefferson	27 carries, 247 yards, 2 TDs
Nevada	Receiving	Brandon Wimberly	8 receptions, 82 yards

=== At Hawaii ===
Nevada at Hawaii

Team	1	2	3	4	Total
• Wolf Pack	14	20	21	14	69
Warriors	3	14	0	7	24

- Date: September 22, 2012
- Location: Aloha Stadium
  Halawa, HI
- Game start: 4:37 p.m.
- Elapsed time: 3 hours and 8 minutes
- Game attendance: 31,417
- Game weather: Temperature: 86 °F (30 °C) • Weather: Partly Cloudy • Wind: NE 17 MPH
- Referee: Daniel Romeo
- TV announcers (NBCSN): Paul Burmeister (play–by–play), Rod Woodson (analyst) and Anthony Herron (sideline)

Scoring summary
1	06:41	NEV	Stefphon Jefferson 55–yard pass from Cody Fajardo (Allen Hardison kick) (4 plays, 72 yards, 1:02)	NEV 7–0
1	03:36	UH	Tyler Hadden 22–yard field goal (8 plays, 56 yards, 2:57)	NEV 7–3
1	01:17	NEV	Stefphon Jefferson 3–yard run (Allen Hardison kick) (8 plays, 62 yards, 2:15)	NEV 14–3
2	13:46	UH	Ryan Hall 19–yard pass from Sean Schroeder (Tyler Hadden kick) (7 plays, 67 yards, 2:24)	NEV 14–10
2	11:08	NEV	Stefphon Jefferson 2–yard run (Allen Hardison kick blocked) (9 plays, 65 yards, 2:38)	NEV 20–10
2	08:37	UH	Jeremiah Ostrowski 36–yard pass from Sean Schroeder (Tyler Hadden kick) (7 plays, 80 yards, 2:26)	NEV 20–17
2	05:35	NEV	Stefphon Jefferson 1–yard run (Allen Hardison kick) (8 plays, 90 yards, 2:58)	NEV 27–17
2	02:00	NEV	Stefphon Jefferson 5–yard run (Allen Hardison kick) (8 plays, 58 yards, 2:42)	NEV 34–17
3	10:34	NEV	Stefphon Jefferson 3–yard run (Allen Hardison kick) (1 play, 3 yards, 0:04)	NEV 41–17
3	04:54	NEV	Zach Sudfeld 8–yard pass from Cody Fajardo (Allen Hardison kick) (11 plays, 63 yards, 4:11)	NEV 48–17
3	00:14	NEV	Stefphon Jefferson 1–yard run (Allen Hardison kick) (8 plays, 54 yards, 3:37)	NEV 55–17
4	12:47	NEV	Khalid Wooten 78–yard interception (Allen Hardison kick)	NEV 62–17
4	06:22	UH	Will Gregory 4–yard run (Tyler Hadden kick) (13 plays, 70 yards, 6:20)	NEV 62–24
4	04:24	NEV	Nick Hale 52–yard run (Allen Hardison kick) (4 plays, 71 yards, 1:52)	NEV 69–24

Statistics	Nevada	Hawaii
First downs	30	20
Total yards	575	378
Rushing yards	355	144
Passing yards	220	234
Turnovers	0	2
Time of possession	28:03	31:57

Team	Category	Player	Statistics
Nevada	Passing	Cody Fajardo	14/20, 220 yards, 2 TDs
Nevada	Rushing	Stefphon Jefferson	31 carries, 170 yards, 6 TDs
Nevada	Receiving	Stefphon Jefferson	3 receptions, 76 yards, 1 TD
Hawaii	Passing	Sean Schroeder	22/40, 234 yards, 2 TDs, 2 INTs
Hawaii	Rushing	Will Gregory	16 carries, 92 yards, 1 TD
Hawaii	Receiving	Jeremiah Ostrowski	7 receptions, 99 yards, 1 TD

=== At Texas State ===
Nevada at Texas State

Team	1	2	3	4	Total
• Wolf Pack	7	13	14	0	34
Bobcats	7	14	0	0	21

- Date: September 29, 2012
- Location: Bobcat Stadium
  San Marcos, TX
- Game start: 1:06 p.m. CDT
- Elapsed time: 3 hours and 13 minutes
- Game attendance: 14,210
- Game weather: Temperature: 75 °F (24 °C) • Weather: Cloudy and Light Rain • Wind: SSE 10 MPH
- Referee: Stacy Hardin
- TV announcers (LHN): Dave Armstrong (play–by–play) and Kelly Stouffer (analyst)

Scoring summary
1	11:15	TXST	Marcus Curry 1–yard run (Will Johnson kick) (5 plays, 17 yards, 2:28)	TXST 7–0
1	07:38	NEV	Zach Sudfeld 9–yard pass from Cody Fajardo (Allen Hardison kick) (10 plays, 75 yards, 3:37)	TIE 7–7
2	14:50	NEV	Allen Hardison 24–yard field goal (13 plays, 60 yards, 5:13)	NEV 10–7
2	09:00	TXST	Tim Gay 2–yard pass from Shaun Rutherford (Will Johnson kick) (3 plays, 23 yards, 1:27)	TXST 14–10
2	05:49	NEV	Allen Hardison 41–yard field goal (10 plays, 57 yards, 3:06)	TXST 14–13
2	02:46	TXST	Andy Erickson 28–yard pass from Shaun Rutherford (Will Johnson kick) (6 plays, 75 yards, 3:03)	TXST 21–13
2	01:41	NEV	Zach Sudfeld 2–yard pass from Cody Fajardo (Allen Hardison kick) (3 plays, 78 yards, 0:59)	TXST 21–20
3	08:08	NEV	Cody Fajardo 6–yard run (Allen Hardison kick) (10 plays, 91 yards, 4:17)	NEV 27–21
3	01:18	NEV	Aaron Bradley 12–yard pass from Cody Fajardo (Allen Hardison kick) (10 plays, 64 yards, 4:57)	NEV 34–21

Statistics	Nevada	Texas State
First downs	31	18
Total yards	559	254
Rushing yards	273	68
Passing yards	286	186
Turnovers	0	2
Time of possession	33:45	26:15

Team	Category	Player	Statistics
Nevada	Passing	Cody Fajardo	21/34, 286 yards, 3 TDs, 1 INT
Nevada	Rushing	Stefphon Jefferson	40 carries, 178 yards
Nevada	Receiving	Brandon Wimberly	6 receptions, 135 yards
Texas State	Passing	Shaun Rutherford	15/22, 143 yards, 2 TDs
Texas State	Rushing	Marcus Curry	8 receptions, 33 yards, 1 TD
Texas State	Receiving	Andy Erickson	8 receptions, 108 yards, 1 TD

=== Wyoming ===
Wyoming at Nevada

Team	1	2	3	4	OT	Total
Cowboys	7	7	7	7	0	28
• Wolf Pack	7	14	0	7	7	35

- Date: October 6, 2012
- Location: Mackay Stadium
  Reno, NV
- Game start: 4:05 p.m. PDT
- Elapsed time: 3 hours and 21 minutes
- Game attendance: 24,025
- Game weather: Temperature: 71 °F (22 °C) • Weather: Sunny • Wind: ENE 6 MPH
- Referee: Cooper Castleberry
- TV announcers (Campus Insiders): Ryan Radtke (play–by–play) and Chris Vargas (analyst)

Scoring summary
1	05:34	WYO	Robert Herron 16–yard pass from Brett Smith (Stuart Williams kick) (6 plays, 40 yards, 2:03)	WYO 7–0
1	01:12	NEV	Nick Hale 3–yard run (Allen Hardison kick) (12 plays, 75 yards, 4:22)	TIE 7–7
2	11:53	NEV	Zach Sudfeld 13–yard pass from Cody Fajardo (Allen Hardison kick) (13 plays, 93 yards, 4:04)	NEV 14–7
2	09:50	NEV	Kendall Brock 20–yard pass from Cody Fajardo (Allen Hardison kick) (6 plays, 47 yards, 1:52)	NEV 21–7
2	01:18	WYO	Robert Herron 6–yard pass from Brett Smith (Stuart Williams kick) (11 plays, 51 yards, 3:46)	NEV 21–14
3	07:34	WYO	Jalen Claiborne 42–yard pass from Brett Smith (Stuart Williams kick) (10 plays, 80 yards, 3:43)	TIE 21–21
4	13:07	WYO	Brett Smith 8–yard run (Stuart Williams kick) (17 plays, 82 yards, 8:11)	WYO 28–21
4	01:18	NEV	Richy Turner 44–yard pass from Devin Combs (Allen Hardison kick) (2 plays, 59 yards, 0:17)	TIE 28–28
OT	15:00	NEV	Aaron Bradley 24–yard pass from Devin Combs (Allen Hardison kick) (2 plays, 60 yards, 0:00)	NEV 35–28

Statistics	Wyoming	Nevada
First downs	22	27
Total yards	350	565
Rushing yards	143	127
Passing yards	207	438
Turnovers	4	4
Time of possession	33:43	26:17

Team	Category	Player	Statistics
Wyoming	Passing	Brett Smith	21/34, 197 yards, 3 TDs, 1 INT
Wyoming	Rushing	Brett Smith	15 carries, 60 yards, 1 TD
Wyoming	Receiving	Dominic Rufran	5 receptions, 43 yards
Nevada	Passing	Cody Fajardo	19/26, 221 yards, 2 TDs, 1 INT
Nevada	Rushing	Stefphon Jefferson	23 carries, 78 yards
Nevada	Receiving	Richy Turner	7 receptions, 150 yards, 1 TD

=== At UNLV ===
Nevada at UNLV
(Battle for the Fremont Cannon / Governor's Series)

Team	1	2	3	4	Total
• Wolf Pack	0	14	7	21	42
Rebels	14	17	0	6	37

- Date: October 13, 2012
- Location: Sam Boyd Stadium
  Whitney, NV
- Game start: 12:06 p.m. PDT
- Elapsed time: 3 hours and 14 minutes
- Game attendance: 20,565
- Game weather: Temperature: 73 °F (23 °C) • Weather: Sunny and 34% Humidity • Wind: ENE 3 MPH
- Referee: Randy Christal
- TV announcers (TWCSN/Charter): Barry Tompkins (play–by–play) and Jay Leeuwenburg (analyst)

Scoring summary
1	10:03	UNLV	Tim Cornett 8–yard run (Nolan Kohorst kick) (10 plays, 68 yards, 4:57)	UNLV 7–0
1	04:28	UNLV	Bradley Randle 32–yard run (Nolan Kohorst kick) (7 plays, 76 yards, 4:25)	UNLV 14–0
2	13:33	UNLV	Nick Sherry 2–yard run (Nolan Kohorst kick) (10 plays, 66 yards, 4:11)	UNLV 21–0
2	06:55	NEV	Stefphon Jefferson 4–yard run (Allen Hardison kick) (9 plays, 67 yards, 3:29)	UNLV 21–7
2	04:03	UNLV	Bradley Randle 2–yard run (Nolan Kohorst kick) (7 plays, 64 yards, 1:44)	UNLV 28–7
2	01:58	NEV	Stefphon Jefferson 1–yard run (Allen Hardison kick) (6 plays, 80 yards, 1:57)	UNLV 28–14
2	00:00	UNLV	Nolan Kohorst 42–yard field goal (10 plays, 57 yards, 1:51)	UNLV 31–14
3	04:31	NEV	Richy Turner 12–yard pass from Devin Combs (Allen Hardison kick) (12 plays, 80 yards, 5:00)	UNLV 31–21
4	12:58	NEV	Stefphon Jefferson 3–yard run (Allen Hardison kick) (11 plays, 61 yards, 4:20)	UNLV 31–28
4	09:43	NEV	Zach Sudfeld 7–yard pass from Devin Combs (Allen Hardison kick) (5 plays, 34 yards, 1:55)	NEV 35–31
4	02:12	NEV	Devin Combs 2–yard run (Allen Hardison kick) (12 plays, 64 yards, 5:26)	NEV 42–31
4	00:44	UNLV	Marcus Sullivan 47–yard pass from Nick Sherry (rush fumbled) (7 plays, 80 yards, 1:22)	NEV 42–37

Statistics	Nevada	UNLV
First downs	33	26
Total yards	496	436
Rushing yards	329	193
Passing yards	167	243
Turnovers	3	1
Time of possession	31:40	28:20

Team	Category	Player	Statistics
Nevada	Passing	Devin Combs	14/19, 167 yards, 2 TDs, 1 INT
Nevada	Rushing	Stefphon Jefferson	34 carries, 185 yards, 3 TDs
Nevada	Receiving	Richy Turner	7 receptions, 99 yards, 1 TD
UNLV	Passing	Nick Sherry	21/35, 243 yards, 1 TD, 1 INT
UNLV	Rushing	Tim Cornett	20 carries, 129 yards, 1 TD
UNLV	Receiving	Marcus Sullivan	5 receptions, 74 yards, 1 TD

=== San Diego State ===
San Diego State at Nevada

Team	1	2	3	4	OT	Total
• Aztecs	0	6	8	17	8	39
Wolf Pack	3	7	14	7	7	38

- Date: October 20, 2012
- Location: Mackay Stadium
  Reno, NV
- Game start: 7:35 p.m. PDT
- Elapsed time: 3 hours and 37 minutes
- Game attendance: 22,242
- Game weather: Temperature: 63 °F (17 °C) • Weather: N/A • Wind: WNW 14 MPH
- Referee: Mike Defee
- TV announcers (CBSSN): James Bates (play–by–play), Aaron Taylor (analyst) and Lauren Gardner (sideline)

Scoring summary
1	01:11	NEV	Allen Hardison 36–yard field goal (15 plays, 70 yards, 6:12)	NEV 3–0
2	09:15	SDSU	Chance Marden 39–yard field goal (15 plays, 53 yards, 6:56)	TIE 3–3
2	04:22	SDSU	Chance Marden 46–yard field goal (5 plays, 17 yards, 1:39)	SDSU 6–3
2	00:05	NEV	Aaron Bradley 10–yard pass from Cody Fajardo (Allen Hardison kick) (10 plays, 56 yards, 1:29)	NEV 10–6
3	08:43	NEV	Cody Fajardo 5–yard run (Allen Hardison kick) (9 plays, 80 yards, 3:13)	NEV 17–6
3	03:39	SDSU	Walter Kazee 3–yard run (Chad Young pass) (10 plays, 62 yards, 4:57)	NEV 17–14
3	01:15	NEV	Brandon Wimberly 3–yard pass from Cody Fajardo (Allen Hardison kick) (7 plays, 75 yards, 2:24)	NEV 24–14
4	11:57	SDSU	Dominique Sandifer 19–yard pass from Adam Dingwell (Chance Marden kick) (9 plays, 73 yards, 4:11)	NEV 24–21
4	07:46	NEV	Stefphon Jefferson 1–yard run (Allen Hardison kick) (11 plays, 65 yards, 4:06)	NEV 31–21
4	03:45	SDSU	Gavin Escobar 4–yard pass from Adam Dingwell (Chance Marden kick) (11 plays, 75 yards, 4:01)	NEV 31–28
4	00:00	SDSU	Chance Marden 35–yard field goal (7 plays, 63 yards, 0:50)	TIE 31–31
OT	15:00	NEV	Brandon Wimberly 3–yard pass from Cody Fajardo (Allen Hardison kick) (7 plays, 25 yards, 0:00)	NEV 38–31
OT	15:00	SDSU	Gavin Escobar 21–yard pass from Adam Dingwell (Adam Roberts pass) (2 plays, 25 yards, 0:00)	SDSU 39–38

Statistics	San Diego State	Nevada
First downs	26	29
Total yards	349	480
Rushing yards	152	176
Passing yards	197	304
Turnovers	1	0
Time of possession	30:37	29:23

Team	Category	Player	Statistics
San Diego State	Passing	Adam Dingwell	14/23, 177 yards, 3 TDs
San Diego State	Rushing	Walter Kazee	15 carries, 58 yards, 1 TD
San Diego State	Receiving	Dominique Sandifer	5 receptions, 60 yards, 1 TD
Nevada	Passing	Cody Fajardo	29/40, 304 yards, 3 TDs
Nevada	Rushing	Stefphon Jefferson	32 carries, 108 yards, 1 TD
Nevada	Receiving	Brandon Wimberly	10 receptions, 132 yards, 2 TDs

=== At Air Force ===
Nevada at Air Force

Team	1	2	3	4	Total
Wolf Pack	7	14	7	3	31
• Falcons	10	21	7	10	48

- Date: October 26, 2012
- Location: Falcon Stadium
  Colorado Springs, CO
- Game start: 6:04 p.m. MDT
- Elapsed time: 3 hours and 20 minutes
- Game attendance: 24,277
- Game weather: Temperature: 33 °F (1 °C) • Weather: Partly Cloudy • Wind: SSE 9 MPH
- Referee: Tom Walker
- TV announcers (CBSSN): Brad Johansen (play–by–play), Doug Chapman (analyst) and Tammy Blackburn (sideline)

Scoring summary
1	10:07	AF	Parker Herrington 45–yard field goal (12 plays, 48 yards, 4:53)	AF 3–0
1	05:50	NEV	Cody Fajardo 1–yard run (Allen Hardison kick) (7 plays, 35 yards, 2:44)	NEV 7–3
1	02:56	AF	Mike DeWitt 8–yard run (Parker Herrington kick) (9 plays, 75 yards, 2:54)	AF 10–7
2	12:18	AF	Donald Strickland 46–yard pass from Connor Dietz (Parker Herrington kick) (8 plays, 95 yards, 2:42)	AF 17–7
2	09:01	NEV	Cody Fajardo 3–yard run (Allen Hardison kick) (7 plays, 75 yards, 3:17)	AF 17–14
2	05:54	AF	Donald Strickland 12–yard run (Parker Herrington kick) (9 plays, 65 yards, 3:01)	AF 24–14
2	02:52	NEV	Aaron Bradley 14–yard pass from Cody Fajardo (Allen Hardison kick) (9 plays, 73 yards, 2:57)	AF 24–21
2	00:56	AF	Marcus Hendricks 29–yard pass from Connor Dietz (Parker Herrington kick) (6 plays, 83 yards, 1:52)	AF 31–21
3	09:45	NEV	Stefphon Jefferson 21–yard run (Allen Hardison kick) (6 plays, 57 yards, 1:51)	AF 31–28
3	04:17	AF	Wes Cobb 1–yard run (Parker Herrington kick) (15 plays, 75 yards, 5:28)	AF 38–28
4	14:57	NEV	Allen Hardison 26–yard field goal (11 plays, 59 yards, 4:15)	AF 38–31
4	09:33	AF	Connor Dietz 1–yard run (Parker Herrington kick) (14 plays, 73 yards, 5:18)	AF 45–31
4	02:27	AF	Parker Herrington 20–yard field goal (11 plays, 59 yards, 5:15)	AF 48–31

Statistics	Nevada	Air Force
First downs	21	36
Total yards	380	600
Rushing yards	169	461
Passing yards	211	139
Turnovers	1	5
Time of possession	25:23	34:37

Team	Category	Player	Statistics
Nevada	Passing	Cody Fajardo	15/27, 211 yards, 1 TD, 1 INT
Nevada	Rushing	Stefphon Jefferson	20 carries, 93 yards, 1 TD
Nevada	Receiving	Zach Sudfeld	6 receptions, 79 yards
Air Force	Passing	Connor Dietz	6/7, 139 yards, 2 TDs
Air Force	Rushing	Wes Cobb	30 carries, 152 yards, 1 TD
Air Force	Receiving	Donald Strickland	2 receptions, 68 yards, 1 TD

=== Fresno State ===
Fresno State at Nevada

Team	1	2	3	4	Total
• Bulldogs	7	14	23	8	52
Wolf Pack	7	14	0	15	36

- Date: November 10, 2012
- Location: Mackay Stadium
  Reno, NV
- Game start: 7:30 p.m. PST
- Elapsed time: 3 hours and 32 minutes
- Game attendance: 22,104
- Game weather: Temperature: 33 °F (1 °C) • Weather: Cold and Partly Cloudy • Wind: Slight
- Referee: Daniel Romeo
- TV announcers (NBCSN): Todd Harris (play–by–play) and Anthony Herron (analyst)

Scoring summary
1	06:27	FS	Davante Adams 36–yard pass from Derek Carr (Quentin Breshears kick) (6 plays, 79 yards, 1:23)	FS 7–0
1	01:26	NEV	Stefphon Jefferson 2–yard run (Colin Ditsworth kick) (12 plays, 81 yards, 4:56)	TIE 7–7
2	10:25	FS	Derron Smith 34–yard interception (Quentin Breshears kick)	FS 14–7
2	08:11	NEV	Stefphon Jefferson 2–yard run (Colin Ditsworth kick) (6 plays, 79 yards, 2:08)	TIE 14–14
2	04:41	NEV	Stefphon Jefferson 7–yard run (Colin Ditsworth kick) (4 plays, 19 yards, 1:00)	NEV 21–14
2	01:28	FS	Marcel Jensen 32–yard pass from Derek Carr (Quentin Breshears kick) (7 plays, 79 yards, 3:08)	TIE 21–21
3	14:12	FS	Tyeler Davison 0–yard fumble recovery (Quentin Breshears kick)	FS 28–21
3	08:52	FS	Quentin Breshears 31–yard field goal (9 plays, 58 yards, 3:18)	FS 31–21
3	08:45	FS	Travis Brown 26–yard fumble recovery (Quentin Breshears kick)	FS 38–21
3	05:41	FS	Robbie Rouse 1–yard run (Quentin Breshears kick) (8 plays, 55 yards, 2:27)	FS 44–21
4	13:59	NEV	Nick Hale 11–yard pass from Cody Fajardo (Colin Ditsworth kick) (9 plays, 79 yards, 3:12)	FS 44–28
4	10:09	FS	Robbie Rouse 39–yard run (Quentin Breshears kick) (8 plays, 78 yards, 3:43)	FS 52–28
4	04:21	NEV	Anthony Knight 1–yard run (Brandon Wimberly pass) (15 plays, 79 yards, 5:42)	FS 52–36

Statistics	Fresno State	Nevada
First downs	26	27
Total yards	500	404
Rushing yards	280	190
Passing yards	220	214
Turnovers	3	4
Time of possession	29:13	30:47

Team	Category	Player	Statistics
Fresno State	Passing	Derek Carr	17/35, 220 yards, 2 TDs
Fresno State	Rushing	Robbie Rouse	36 carries, 261 yards, 2 TDs
Fresno State	Receiving	Davante Adams	9 receptions, 120 yards, 1 TD
Nevada	Passing	Cody Fajardo	21/39, 214 yards, 1 TD, 2 INTs
Nevada	Rushing	Stefphon Jefferson	19 carries, 95 yards, 3 TDs
Nevada	Receiving	Richy Turner	6 receptions, 73 yards

=== At New Mexico ===
Nevada at New Mexico
(Battle of the Wolves)

Team	1	2	3	4	Total
• Wolf Pack	7	14	10	0	31
Lobos	14	3	7	0	24

- Date: November 17, 2012
- Location: University Stadium
  Albuquerque, NM
- Game start: 1:36 p.m. MST
- Elapsed time: 2 hours and 42 minutes
- Game attendance: 17,290
- Game weather: Temperature: 60 °F (16 °C) • Weather: Partly Cloudy • Wind: SSW 5 MPH
- Referee: Alan Eck
- TV announcers (Charter/Comcast): Rich Cellini (play–by–play), Ted Sundquist (analyst) and J. P. Murrieta (sideline)

Scoring summary
1	13:44	NM	Cole Gautsche 20–yard run (Justus Adams kick) (3 plays, 75 yards, 1:16)	NM 7–0
1	09:39	NEV	Stefphon Jefferson 1–yard run (Colin Ditsworth kick) (12 plays, 67 yards, 3:58)	TIE 7–7
1	04:07	NM	Cole Gautsche 3–yard run (Justus Adams kick) (9 plays, 69 yards, 5:26)	NM 14–7
2	12:34	NEV	Stephen Jeffers 1–yard pass from Cody Fajardo (Colin Ditsworth kick) (7 plays, 60 yards, 2:45)	TIE 14–14
2	06:45	NM	Justus Adams 42–yard field goal (10 plays, 50 yards, 5:49)	NM 17–14
2	05:00	NEV	Brandon Wimberly 3–yard pass from Cody Fajardo (Colin Ditsworth kick) (5 plays, 75 yards, 1:45)	NEV 21–17
3	10:51	NEV	Colin Ditsworth 23–yard field goal (10 plays, 68 yards, 4:09)	NEV 24–17
3	08:48	NM	Jhurell Pressley 2–yard run (Justus Adams kick) (4 plays, 79 yards, 1:56)	TIE 24–24
3	04:02	NEV	Brandon Wimberly 2–yard pass from Cody Fajardo (Colin Ditsworth kick) (12 plays, 75 yards, 4:46)	NEV 31–24

Statistics	Nevada	New Mexico
First downs	22	14
Total yards	491	352
Rushing yards	358	352
Passing yards	133	0
Turnovers	2	3
Time of possession	29:40	30:20

Team	Category	Player	Statistics
Nevada	Passing	Cody Fajardo	18/27, 133 yards, 3 TDs, 1 INT
Nevada	Rushing	Cody Fajardo	20 carries, 186 yards
Nevada	Receiving	Zach Sudfeld	3 receptions, 42 yards
New Mexico	Passing	Cole Gautsche	0/2
New Mexico	Rushing	Kasey Carrier	18 carries, 145 yards
New Mexico	Receiving	N/A	N/A

=== Boise State ===
Boise State at Nevada
(rivalry)

Team	1	2	3	4	Total
• No. 25 Broncos	7	10	7	3	27
Wolf Pack	0	0	7	14	21

- Date: December 1, 2012
- Location: Mackay Stadium
  Reno, NV
- Game start: 12:35 p.m. PST
- Elapsed time: 2 hours and 57 minutes
- Game attendance: 30,017
- Game weather: Temperature: 56 °F (13 °C) • Weather: Mostly Cloudy • Wind: S 30 MPH
- Referee: Daniel Romeo
- TV announcers (ABC): Mike Patrick (play–by–play), Ed Cunningham (analyst) and Jeannine Edwards (sideline)

Scoring summary
1	06:12	BSU	Chris Potter 17–yard pass from Joe Southwick (Michael Frisina kick) (9 plays, 80 yards, 4:16)	BSU 7–0
2	13:54	BSU	D. J. Harper 2–yard run (Michael Frisina kick) (11 plays, 66 yards, 3:44)	BSU 14–0
2	03:37	BSU	Michael Frisina 20–yard field goal (14 plays, 83 yards, 7:13)	BSU 17–0
3	11:08	NEV	Stefphon Jefferson 1–yard run (Allen Hardison kick) (9 plays, 86 yards, 3:47)	BSU 17–7
3	10:52	BSU	Matt Miller 52–yard pass from Joe Southwick (Michael Frisina kick) (1 play, 52 yards, 0:07)	BSU 24–7
4	08:26	NEV	Stefphon Jefferson 8–yard run (Allen Hardison kick) (6 plays, 71 yards, 2:15)	BSU 24–14
4	03:25	BSU	Michael Frisina 30–yard field goal (12 plays, 49 yards, 4:55)	BSU 27–14
4	02:27	NEV	Cody Fajardo 6–yard run (Allen Hardison kick) (5 plays, 74 yards, 0:52)	BSU 27–21

Statistics	Boise State	Nevada
First downs	22	23
Total yards	434	430
Rushing yards	215	227
Passing yards	219	203
Turnovers	0	2
Time of possession	32:44	27:16

Team	Category	Player	Statistics
Boise State	Passing	Joe Southwick	19/26, 199 yards, 2 TDs
Boise State	Rushing	D. J. Harper	24 carries, 130 yards, 1 TD
Boise State	Receiving	Matt Miller	7 receptions, 127 yards, 1 TD
Nevada	Passing	Cody Fajardo	14/20, 203 yards
Nevada	Rushing	Stefphon Jefferson	28 carries, 139 yards, 2 TDs
Nevada	Receiving	Zach Sudfeld	3 receptions, 67 yards

=== Vs. Arizona (New Mexico Bowl) ===
Nevada vs. Arizona
(New Mexico Bowl)

Team	1	2	3	4	Total
Wolf Pack	21	10	14	3	48
• Wildcats	7	21	0	21	49

- Date: December 15, 2012
- Location: University Stadium
  Albuquerque, NM
- Game start: 11:01 a.m. MST
- Elapsed time: 2 hours and 40 minutes
- Game attendance: 24,610
- Game weather: Temperature: 47 °F (8 °C) • Weather: Mostly Cloudy • Wind: SSW 10 MPH
- Referee: Brad Allen
- TV announcers (ESPN): Bob Wischusen (play–by–play), Danny Kanell (analyst) and Kaylee Hartung (sideline)

Scoring summary
1	12:12	NEV	Stefphon Jefferson 16–yard run (Allen Hardison kick) (8 plays, 75 yards, 2:48)	NEV 7–0
1	04:43	NEV	Zach Sudfeld 17–yard pass from Cody Fajardo (Allen Hardison kick) (8 plays, 48 yards, 3:13)	NEV 14–0
1	04:29	NEV	Zach Sudfeld 28–yard pass from Cody Fajardo (Allen Hardison kick) (1 play, 28 yards, 0:06)	NEV 21–0
1	01:52	ARIZ	Ka'Deem Carey 21–yard run (John Bonano kick) (11 plays, 72 yards, 2:31)	NEV 21–7
2	12:46	ARIZ	Matt Scott 1–yard run (John Bonano kick) (9 plays, 71 yards, 2:20)	NEV 21–14
2	10:23	ARIZ	Ka'Deem Carey 1–yard run (John Bonano kick) (8 plays, 59 yards, 1:21)	TIE 21–21
2	05:57	NEV	Stefphon Jefferson 14–yard run (Allen Hardison kick) (11 plays, 76 yards, 4:20)	NEV 28–21
2	04:22	ARIZ	Ka'Deem Carey 9–yard run (John Bonano kick) (6 plays, 75 yards, 1:35)	TIE 28–28
2	00:02	NEV	Allen Hardison 27–yard field goal (16 plays, 66 yards, 4:22)	NEV 31–28
3	09:19	NEV	Richy Turner 33–yard pass from Cody Fajardo (Allen Hardison kick) (11 plays, 89 yards, 4:13)	NEV 38–28
3	01:33	NEV	Cody Fajardo 1–yard run (Allen Hardison kick) (15 plays, 83 yards, 6:26)	NEV 45–28
4	14:44	ARIZ	Austin Hill 63–yard pass from Matt Scott (John Bonano kick) (7 plays, 89 yards, 1:41)	NEV 45–35
4	01:48	NEV	Allen Hardison 25–yard field goal (10 plays, 30 yards, 4:27)	NEV 48–35
4	00:46	ARIZ	Austin Hill 2–yard pass from Matt Scott (John Bonano kick) (7 plays, 75 yards, 1:02)	NEV 48–42
4	00:19	ARIZ	Tyler Slavin 2–yard pass from Matt Scott (John Bonano kick) (3 plays, 51 yards, 0:21)	ARIZ 49–48

Statistics	Nevada	Arizona
First downs	39	31
Total yards	659	578
Rushing yards	403	196
Passing yards	256	382
Turnovers	6	3
Time of possession	39:10	20:50

Team	Category	Player	Statistics
Nevada	Passing	Cody Fajardo	22/31, 256 yards, 3 TDs, 2 INTs
Nevada	Rushing	Stefphon Jefferson	34 carries, 180 yards, 2 TDs
Nevada	Receiving	Richy Turner	6 receptions, 96 yards, 1 TD
Arizona	Passing	Matt Scott	28/47, 382 yards, 3 TDs, 2 INTs
Arizona	Rushing	Ka'Deem Carey	28 carries, 172 yards, 3 TDs
Arizona	Receiving	Austin Hill	8 receptions, 175 yards, 2 TDs

== Players in the 2013 NFL draft ==
Player	Position	Round	Pick	NFL club
Duke Williams	DB	4	105	Buffalo Bills
Khalid Wooten	DB	6	202	Tennessee Titans

== Roster ==
2012 Nevada Wolf Pack football team roster
Players
Coaches
Offense

Pos.	#	Name	Class
QB	1F	Hasaan Henderson	Fr
QB	1J	Jacob Hollister	Fr
WR	1I	Marquis Newell	Fr
WR	1A	Austin Rauh	Fr
WR	2F	Nick Palko	Fr
RB	3D	Drake Griffin	Fr
RB	3J	Chris Solomon	Fr
WR	3	Nigel Westbrooks	Jr
TE	4H	Cody Tuttle	Fr
WR	4	Brandon Wimberly	Sr
RB	6	Anthony Knight	Fr
WR	12	Richy Turner	So
QB	13	Devin Combs	So
QB	14	Tanner Roderick	Fr
QB	15	Tyler Stewart	Fr
WR	16	Cody Hollister	Fr
QB	17	Cody Fajardo (C)	So
RB	20	Kendall Brock	So
RB	25	Stefphon Jefferson	Jr
WR	31	Randy Uzoma	Fr
RB	32	Nick Hale	Sr
RB	33	Xavier Stephens	Fr
RB	38	Nate Lytle	So
RB	39	Nate McLaurin	So
TE	44	Zach Sudfeld	Sr
TE	47	Jarred Gipson	Fr
OL	57	Connor Talbott	Fr
OL	59	Kyle Papendorf	So
OL	62	Zach Brickell	So
OL	63	Aisea Hansen	Fr
OL	64	Abe Abdelkarim	Fr
OL	65	Matt Galas	So
OL	66	Kyle Roberts	So
OL	67	Brent Roling	So
OL	70	Joel Bitonio	Jr
OL	71	Salesa Faraimo	Fr
OL	72	Jeremy Macauley	Fr
OL	73	Sebastian Tretola	Fr
OL	74	Abel De Haro	So
OL	75	Chris Barker	Sr
OL	76	Bryce Spring	Fr
OL	77	Alex Pinto	Sr
OL	78	Jeff Nady	Sr
OL	79	Jacob Henry	Fr
WR	80	Dominic Coulter	Fr
WR	81	Aaron Bradley	So
WR	82	Parker Vail	So
WR	83	Joseph Huber	Jr
WR	84	Jerico Richardson	Fr
TE	85	Randy Horton	So
TE	86	Kolby Arendse	Jr
WR	87	Necho Beard	So
WR	88	Chance Early	Fr
OL	89	Stephen Jeffers	Jr
OL	92	Jordan Hanson	So
OL	96	Tyler Wilson	Fr

Defense

Pos.	#	Name	Class
DB	1E	L.J. Jackson	Fr
DB	2	Khalid Wooten	Sr
LB	3H	Trent Mahler	Fr
DB	4F	Soni Mailei	Fr
DB	5	Duke Williams	Sr
DB	8	Marlon Johnson	Sr
DB	9	Markus Smith	Jr
DL	10	Reggie Coates	Fr
LB	11	Burton De Koning	Fr
DB	18	Bryson Keeton	Fr
DB	19	Evan Favors	So
DB	23	Nigel Haikins	Jr
DB	24	Charles Garrett	So
LB	26	Dray Bell	Sr
DB	28	Bryan Lane Jr.	Fr
DB	29	Arthur Forrest II	Jr
LB	30	Zach Vallejo	Jr
DB	34	Ty Thompson	Sr
LB	35	Lorenzo Devers	Fr
LB	36	Danny DeCarlo	Jr
LB	40	Josh Wiley	Jr
LB	42	DeAndre Boughton	Sr
DB	43	Gabe Lee	So
DL	45	Cortez Woods	Jr
LB	48	Travis Hansen	Jr
LB	49	Jordan Dobrich	Fr
LB	50	Jonathan McNeal	So
LB	51	Albert Rosette	Sr
LB	52	Trevor Taft	Fr
DL	53	Brock Hekking	So
LB	54	Jeremiah Green	Sr
DL	55	Rykeem Yates	Fr
LB	56	Alex Bertrando	Fr
DL	58	Nolan Dambacher	Fr
DL	90	Tyler Houk	So
DL	91	Jake Peppard	So
LB	93	Brian Guendling	Fr
DL	94	Lenny Jones	Fr
DL	95	Fred Lavulo	Jr
DL	97	Mark Avery	Sr
DL	98	Jack Reynoso	Jr
DL	99	Sam Foster	Jr

Special teams

Pos.	#	Name	Class
P	37	Chase Tenpenny	Jr
PK	46	Colin Ditsworth	So
PK	60	Allen Hardison	Sr

Head coach

- Chris Ault

Coordinators/assistant coaches

- Nick Rolovich – Offensive coordinator/quarterbacks
- Mike Bradeson – Defensive coordinator/safeties
- Ken Wilson – Associate head coach/defensive ends/linebackers
- Scott Baumgartner – Assistant coach
- Larry Lewis – Special teams coordinator/running backs
- James Ward – Cornerbacks
- Darren Hiller – Offensive line
- James Spady – Tight ends/assistant offensive Line
- Barry Sacks – Defensive tackles
- Mike Bethea – Graduate assistant (Defense)
- Rickey Thenarse – Graduate assistant (Offense)

Support staff

- Dave Brown – Director of football operations
- Andy Vaughn – Director of player personnel

Legend

- (C) Team captain
- (S) Suspended
- (I) Ineligible
- Injured
- Redshirt

Roster
Last update: February 2, 2021

== Team awards ==
The 2012 Team Awards were handed out December 9, 2012.

Golden Helmet Award (MVP)

- Albert Rosette, senior linebacker

Outstanding Offensive Player

- Stefphon Jefferson, junior running back

Outstanding Defensive Player

- Duke Williams, senior safety

Outstanding Special Teams Player

- Khalid Wooten, senior punt returner

Nevadatude Award (best representative of the beliefs and ideals of the program)

- Zach Sudfeld, senior tight end

Basalite Big Blocker (given the offensive lineman who grades out the best in victories)

- Matt Galas – UNLV
- Joel Bitonio – Northwestern State, Hawaii, Wyoming
- Jeff Nady – Cal, Texas State, New Mexico

Blackout Award (big hitter)

- Duke Williams, senior safety

Fireman's Award (stepping up in a time of need)

- Devin Combs, sophomore quarterback

Full-speed, Effort and Habit Awards (scout team players of the year)

- Offense: Chris Solomon, freshman running back
- Defense: Gabe Lee, sophomore defensive back
