= 2012 New Mexico Bowl =

American college football game

2012 Gildan New Mexico Bowl
Nevada Wolf Pack	Arizona Wildcats
(7–5)	(7–5)
Mountain West	Pac-12
48	49
Head coach: Chris Ault	Head coach: Rich Rodriguez
	1	2	3	4	Total
Nevada	21	10	14	3	48
Arizona	7	21	0	21	49
- Date: December 15, 2012
- Season: 2012
- Stadium: University Stadium
- Location: Albuquerque, New Mexico
- MVP: Offense: Matt Scott, QB- Arizona; Defense: Marquis Flowers, LB- Arizona
- Favorite: Arizona by 9
- Referee: Brad Allen (ACC)
- Attendance: 24,610

United States TV coverage
- Network: ESPN
- Announcers: Bob Wischusen (Play-by-play); Danny Kanell (Analyst); Kaylee Hartung (Sidelines)

The 2012 Gildan New Mexico Bowl was a post-season American college football bowl game that was held on December 15, 2012, at University Stadium on the campus of the University of New Mexico in Albuquerque, New Mexico in the United States. The seventh edition of the New Mexico Bowl began at 11:00 a.m. MST and aired on ESPN. It featured the Nevada Wolf Pack, who represented the Mountain West Conference in their first year as a member, against the Arizona Wildcats, who represented the Pac-12 Conference. The Wolf Pack accepted their invitation with a 7–4 record in their first eleven games of the season, while the Wildcats accepted their invitation after finishing the regular season at 7–5. The bowl was the first of 35 played in the 2012–13 bowl game season.

Coming into the game, both teams had sound offenses and were led by their respective running backs, sophomore Ka'Deem Carey for Arizona and senior Stefphon Jefferson for Nevada, who ranked number one and number two respectively in total rushing yards during the regular season. Arizona and Nevada ranked third and fourth respectively in total offense. Both teams' defenses were ranked towards the bottom of college football. Consequently, the game was widely expected to be high-scoring.

Arizona won the game 49–48 after scoring two touchdowns in the final two minutes to come back for the victory. As expected, the game was dominated by offense; Arizona and Nevada combined for 1234 total yards and 70 first downs. Despite losing the game, Nevada possessed the ball nearly twice as long and gained twice as many rushing yards as Arizona. Arizona quarterback Matt Scott was named the game's offensive most valuable player (MVP), and teammate Marquis Flowers, a linebacker, was named the game's defensive MVP.

== Teams ==
The New Mexico Bowl is played annually at the campus stadium of the University of New Mexico, a founding member of the Mountain West Conference which has had a tie-in since the game's establishment in 2006. 2012 was the first year of the Pac-12's tie in. The game featured the nation's top rushers, Arizona's All-American Ka'Deem Carey (146.4 ypg) and Nevada's Stefphon Jefferson (141.9 ypg). It also featured Arizona quarterback Matt Scott (3,723 total offense yards) and Nevada quarterback Cody Fajardo (3,511 total offense yards).

This was the fourth meeting between these two teams. Arizona leads the all-time record 2–1–1. The last time they played was in 1941.

=== Arizona ===
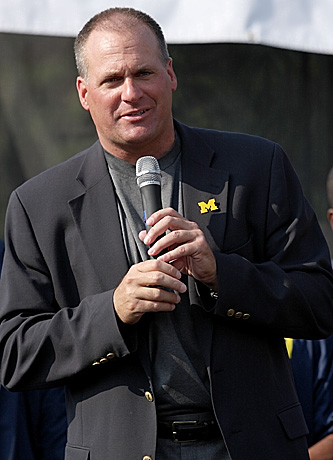
The 2012 New Mexico Bowl was Rich Rodriguez's first bowl game with Arizona.

Arizona came off of a 7-5 (4–5 in conference) season in coach Rich Rodriguez's debut with the team. Arizona started their season by beating Toledo, Oklahoma State, and South Carolina State prior to getting blown out 49–0 by Oregon. Later in the season, Arizona beat USC who was ranked #9. Star running back Ka'Deem Carey had his best game of the year against Colorado totaling 366 yards to give the Wildcats their sixth win of the season. Their regular season concluded with a loss to rival Arizona State 41–34.

The 2012 edition was the first appearance in the bowl for both Arizona and for the Pac-12. Arizona, seventh best in the nation in total offense (521.83 ypg), was led by quarterback Matt Scott (338.45 ypg, 3,238 yards passing), All-American running back Ka'Deem Carey who led the nation in rushing (146.42 ypg) and set a school record with his 1,757 rushing yards, good for 21 touchdowns, and wide receiver Austin Hill who totaled 1,189 yards. 2012 was the first season in Arizona's history during which they had a 3000-yard passer, a 1000-yard rusher, and a 1000-yard receiver. Senior place kicker John Bonano was named the 2012 Pac-12 Football Scholar-Athlete of the Year (Physiology major with a 3.927 GPA).

=== Nevada ===
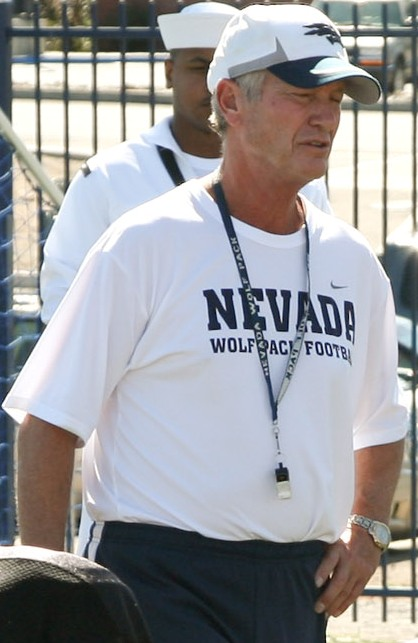
The 2012 New Mexico Bowl was Chris Ault's last game with Nevada.

The Wolf Pack came off their inaugural season as a member of the Mountain West, during which they compiled a conference record of 4–3, good for fifth place in the conference. They began their season by defeating rival California 31–24. After losing to South Florida by a single point, Nevada won five consecutive games to achieve bowl eligibility. The Wolf Pack then dropped three of their final four to bring their record to 7–5. After defeating the New Mexico Lobos to improve their record to 7–4, the Wolf Pack accepted an invitation to the New Mexico Bowl.

Nevada coach Chris Ault was one of three members of the College Football Hall of Fame to lead a team into a bowl game, along with Barry Alvarez (Wisconsin interim coach) and Steve Spurrier (South Carolina). Nevada's senior receiver Brandon Wimberly had caught a pass in all 39 games of his college career. This was the Wolf Pack's second New Mexico Bowl; they had previously played in the 2007 edition (then as a member of the Western Athletic Conference), losing to the hometown New Mexico Lobos by a score of 23–0.

== Pregame buildup ==
This was the first bowl of the 2012-13 College Football Bowl season. Prior to 2012, the teams had not met since 1941 despite their close proximity. In 1941, Arizona beat Nevada 26–7. Overall, the series record prior to the game was 1–1–1. Arizona, who had appeared in a bowl game in four of the previous five seasons, made the Pac-12's first appearance in the New Mexico Bowl. Nevada made its eighth consecutive bowl appearance and second all-time in the New Mexico Bowl.

=== Offense ===
Coming into the game, Arizona and Nevada were two of the top offenses in the country, ranking 7th and 10th in yards per game respectively. There was also significant hype surrounding the game because it featured two of the best running backs in the country, Ka'Deem Carey for Arizona, and Stefphon Jefferson for Nevada. Carey was ranked number one in the country in total rushing yards, while Jefferson was ranked number two. The duo were also prolific scorers; Jefferson was second in the country in rushing touchdowns with 25 and Carey was third with 24. The game was widely expected to be a shoot-out, as both teams were in the top-20 scoring offenses in the regular season.

=== Defense ===
There were very low expectations for the defenses; the over/under was set at 75.5 total points. During the regular season, both defenses were ranked in the bottom 30 (out of 120) in points allowed. Despite having three players on the All-Mountain West team, Nevada allowed opponents to convert third downs 47.2% of the time (107th in the country). Arizona was led defensively during the regular season by Jake Fischer, who accumulated 119 total tackles, while Nevada was led by Albert Rosette who totaled 135 regular season tackles.

== Game summary ==
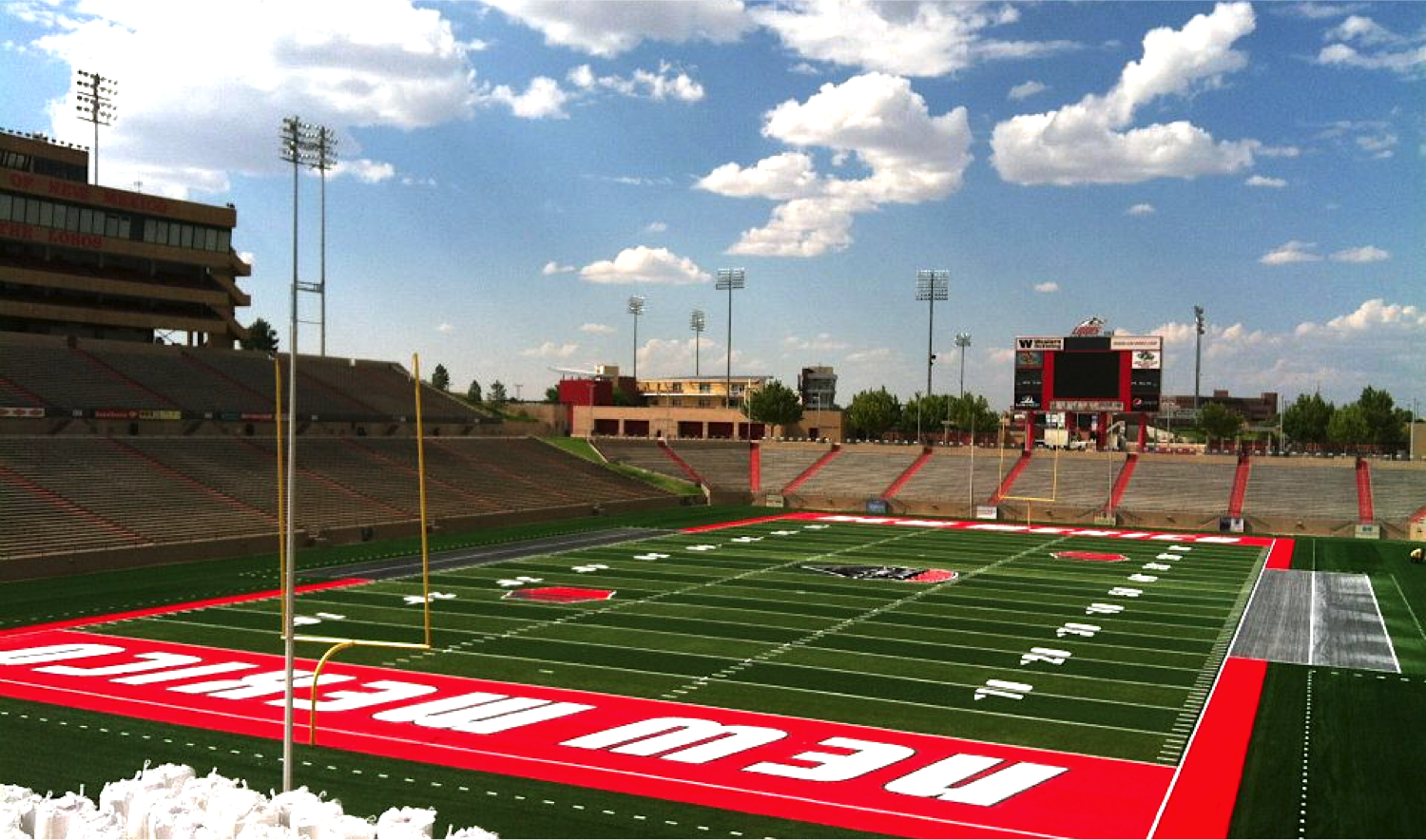
The 2012 New Mexico Bowl was played at University Stadium.

=== First quarter ===
Nevada methodically moved down the field on their first drive and scored first on a 16-yard run by Stefphon Jefferson to cap off an 8-play, 75-yard drive. Later in the quarter, the Wolf Pack took a 14–0 lead following a 17-yard touchdown pass from quarterback Cody Fajardo to Zach Sudfeld. Arizona fumbled on the ensuing kickoff. On the first play of their drive, Nevada took a 21–0 lead on a 28-yard touchdown pass to Sudfeld. All-American running back Ka'Deem Carey finally got Arizona on the board with a 21-yard touchdown run late in the first quarter.

=== Second quarter ===
In the second quarter, Arizona outscored Nevada 21–10. Taking advantage of two Nevada turnovers, an interception thrown by Cody Fajardo and a fumble by Stefphon Jefferson, Arizona was able to tie the game at 21 with one-yard touchdown runs by Matt Scott and Carey, respectively. Nevada regained the lead on a 14-yard rushing touchdown by Jefferson, but Arizona tied the game once again on a 9-yard Carey touchdown run, his third of the game. Nevada enjoyed a three-point lead at the half after a 27 field goal by Allen Hardison capped off a 16-play, 65-yard drive and made the score 31–28.

=== Third quarter ===
After kicking off to start the game, Arizona got the ball first in the second half. Their first drive went three-and-out. After a 51-yard punt, Nevada took over at their own 11-yard line. They put together an 11-play, 89-yard drive that culminated with a 33-yard touchdown pass from Cody Fajardo to Richy Turner. During the course of throwing the touchdown pass, Fajardo hurt his hand and was seen shaking it on his way to the end zone to celebrate the score. He returned for Nevada's next offensive drive. Arizona's next drive got them into Nevada territory, but an interception thrown by Matt Scott ended any hopes of scoring. Nevada took the field and drove 84 yards down the field on 15 plays. Near the end of the drive once Nevada was inside the 10-yard line, Fajardo ran the ball for a gain of three yards. During the course of the play, he took a hit to the head from an Arizona defender. He exited the game for one play, but subsequently returned on that drive and scored a one-yard rushing touchdown. Arizona was held scoreless in the quarter, and heading into the final quarter of regulation, Nevada possessed a 45–28 lead.

=== Fourth quarter ===
Arizona came into the fourth quarter trailing Nevada by 17 points. Arizona was able to cut the lead to 45–35 on a 63-yard touchdown pass from Scott to Austin Hill soon after the 4th quarter began. Nevada then took a 48–35 lead on a 25-yard field goal from Hardison, for a 13-point lead with only 1:44 left in regulation time. Arizona, with no timeouts and needing two scores to win the game, was able to cut the lead down to 48–42 with only 42 seconds left in regulation on a short touchdown pass from Scott to Hill. After Marquis Flowers successfully recovered the onside kick, Arizona quickly scored with another short Scott touchdown pass, this time to Tyler Slavin, to take tie the game at 48 with only 19 seconds left in regulation. Prior to the extra point attempt, Nevada coach Chris Ault called his final timeout to try to ice kicker John Bonano. The tactic was unsuccessful, as Bonano made the extra point to give Arizona a one-point lead. The final 19 seconds of the game were the only time that Arizona led. Arizona held on to the lead after Arizona's Flowers intercepted a Fajardo pass with a few seconds remaining in the game.

== Scoring summary ==
Scoring summary

Quarter	Time	Drive			Team	Scoring information	Score	
Quarter	Time	Plays	Yards	TOP	Team	Scoring information	Nevada	Arizona
1	12:12	8	75	2:48	Nevada	Stefphon Jefferson 16-yard touchdown run, Allen Hardison kick good	7	0
1	4:43	8	48	3:13	Nevada	Zach Sudfield 17-yard touchdown reception from Cody Fajardo, Hardison kick good	14	0
1	4:29	1	28	0:06	Nevada	Sudfeld 28-yard touchdown reception from Fajardo, Hardison kick good	21	0
1	1:52	11	72	2:31	Arizona	Ka'Deem Carey 21-yard touchdown run, John Bonano kick good	21	7
2	12:46	9	71	2:20	Arizona	Matt Scott 1-yard touchdown run, Bonano kick good	21	14
2	10:23	8	59	1:21	Arizona	Carey 1-yard touchdown run, Bonano kick good	21	21
2	5:57	11	76	4:20	Nevada	Jefferson 14-yard touchdown run, Hardison kick good	28	21
2	4:22	6	75	1:35	Arizona	Carey 9-yard touchdown run, Bonano kick good	28	28
2	0:02	16	66	4:22	Nevada	27-yard field goal by Hardison	31	28
3	9:19	11	89	4:13	Nevada	Richy Turner 33-yard touchdown reception from Fajardo, Hardison kick good	38	28
3	1:33	15	83	6:26	Nevada	Fajardo 1-yard touchdown run, Hardison kick good	45	28
4	14:44	7	89	1:41	Arizona	Austin Hill 63-yard touchdown reception from Scott, Bonano kick good	45	35
4	1:48	10	30	4:27	Nevada	25-yard field goal by Hardison	48	35
4	0:46	7	75	1:02	Arizona	Hill 2-yard touchdown reception from Scott, Bonano kick good	48	42
4	0:19	3	51	0:21	Arizona	Tyler Slavin 2-yard touchdown reception from Scott, Bonano kick good	48	49
"TOP" = time of possession. For other American football terms, see Glossary of American football.							48	49

== Statistics ==
Statistics	Nevada	Arizona
First downs	39	31
Total offense, plays – yards	105–659	83–578
Rushes–yards (net)	73–403	36–196
Passing yards (net)	256	382
Passes, Comp–Att–Int	22–32–2	28–47–2
Time of Possession	39:10	20:50

=== Individual statistics ===
Passing

Team	Name	Comp./Att.	Yards	Touchdowns	Interceptions
ARI	Matt Scott	28/47	382	3	2
NEV	Cody Fajardo	22/31	256	3	2

Rushing

Team	Name	Attempts	Yards	Touchdowns
ARI	Ka'Deem Carey	28	172	3
ARI	Matt Scott	6	22	1
ARI	Daniel Jenkins	1	6	0
NEV	Stefphon Jefferson	34	180	2
NEV	Cody Fajardo	22	140	1
NEV	Nick Hale	14	73	0

Receiving

Team	Name	Receptions	Yards	Touchdowns
ARI	Austin Hill	8	175	2
ARI	Garic Wharton	6	70	0
ARI	David Richards	5	53	0
ARI	Tyler Slavin	4	37	1
ARI	Dan Buckner	2	32	0
NEV	Brandon Wimberly	7	57	0
NEV	Richy Turner	6	96	1
NEV	Aaron Bradley	3	34	0
NEV	Zach Sudfeld	2	45	2
NEV	Joseph Huber	1	13	0

== Aftermath ==
On December 28, 2012, nearly two weeks after the bowl game, Nevada head coach Chris Ault announced that he would resign from his position as head football coach at Nevada. Son of former National Football League executive Bill Polian Brian Polian was subsequently signed a five-year contract to be the new head coach of the Wolf Pack on January 7, 2013.
