= 2012 California Golden Bears football team =

American college football season

2012 California Golden Bears football
- Conference: Pac-12 Conference
- North Division
- Record: 3–9 (2–7 Pac-12)
- Head coach: Jeff Tedford (11th season)
- Offensive coordinator: Jim Michalczik (3rd season)
- Offensive scheme: Pro-style
- Defensive coordinator: Clancy Pendergast (3rd season)
- Base defense: 3–4
- MVPs: Isi Sofele; Steve Williams
- Home stadium: California Memorial Stadium

2012 Pac-12 Conference football standings
	Conf.			Overall
Team	W		L	W		L
North Division
No. 7 Stanford xy$	8	–	1	12	–	2
No. 2 Oregon x%	8	–	1	12	–	1
No. 20 Oregon State	6	–	3	9	–	4
Washington	5	–	4	7	–	6
California	2	–	7	3	–	9
Washington State	1	–	8	3	–	9
South Division
UCLA xy	6	–	3	9	–	5
Arizona State	5	–	4	8	–	5
USC	5	–	4	7	–	6
Arizona	4	–	5	8	–	5
Utah	3	–	6	5	–	7
Colorado	1	–	8	1	–	11
Championship: Stanford 27, UCLA 24
$ – BCS representative as conference champion; % – BCS at-large representative; x – Division champion/co-champions; y – Championship game participant; Rankings from AP Poll

The 2012 California Golden Bears football team represented University of California, Berkeley in the 2012 NCAA Division I FBS college football season. The Bears were led by eleventh-year head coach Jeff Tedford and played their home games at Memorial Stadium after having played at home the previous season at AT&T Park due to reconstruction on Memorial Stadium. They were members of the North Division of the Pac-12 Conference.

Coming off a 7–5 previous season, the Bears fell to 3–9 (2–7 in the Pac-12), the second losing season in three years and the worst of the Tedford era. Despite a decisive win over eventual Pac-12 South winner UCLA, Cal closed out the season with five consecutive losses. While wide receiver Keenan Allen became the team's all time leader in career receptions, no receiver posted a 1,000-yard season and no running backs broke the 1,000-yard rushing mark. Tedford was subsequently fired as head coach on November 20.

== Roster ==
2012 California Golden Bears Spring Football
Quarterbacks: 6 Kyle Boehm – Freshman; 7 Austin Hinder – Sophomore; 8 Zach Kline – Freshman; 15 Zach Maynard – Senior; 16 Allan Bridgford – Junior; Tailbacks: 2 Daniel Lasco Freshman; 5 Brendan Bigelow – Sophomore; 9 C. J. Anderson – Senior; 13 Mike Manuel – Senior; 20 Isi Sofele – Senior; 23 Dasarte Yarnway – Junior; 24 Trajuan Briggs – Sophomore; 27 Mitchel Bartolo – Junior; 34 Darren Ervin – Freshman; Fullbacks: 22 Nico Dumont – Junior; 32 David Aknin – Senior; 48 Eric Stevens – Senior; Wide receivers: 3 Maurice Harris – Freshman; 21 Keenan Allen – Junior; 28 Jackson Bouza – Junior; 81 Ross Bostock – Senior; 86 Bryce McGovern – Sophomore; 88 Kaulin Krebs – Senior; 89 Stephen Anderson – Freshman; Tight ends: 11 Richard Rodgers – Sophomore P; 45 Spencer Ladner – Senior; 46 Brett Buchanan – Sophomore; 82 Jake Davis – Junior; 84 Jacob Wark – Sophomore; 87 Spencer Hagan – Junior	Offensive linemen: 57 Brian Schwenke – Senior; 58 Chris Adcock – Sophomore; 59 Brian Farley – Freshman; 65 Dominic Galas – Senior; 68 Mark Brazinski – Junior; 70 Geoffrey Gibson – Sophomore; 71 Alejandro Crosthwaite – Sophomore; 72 Matt Williams – Junior; 73 Jordan Rigsbee – Freshman; 75 Matt Summers-Gavin – Senior; 76 Christian Okafor – Freshman; 77 Tyler Rigsbee – Senior; 79 Bill Tyndall – Junior; Defensive linemen: 17 Brennan Scarlett – Sophomore; 39 Nathan Phillip – (redshirt) Junior; 41 Todd Barr – (redshirt) Freshman; 50 Aaron Tipoti – (redshirt) Senior; 54 Austin Clark – (redshirt) Junior; 55 Viliami Moala – Sophomore; 56 Keni Kaufusi – (redshirt) Junior; 75 Puka Lopa – (redshirt) Freshman; 90 Mustafa Jalil – Sophomore; 91 Deandre Coleman – (redshirt) Junior; 96 Kendrick Payne – (redshirt) Senior; 99 Gabe King – (redshirt) Sophomore; Linebackers: 7 Jalen Jefferson – (redshirt) Freshman; 9 Jason Gibson – (redshirt) Freshman; 10 Lucas King – (redshirt) Sophomore; 11 Nick Forbes – (redshirt) Sophomore; 14 Cecil Whiteside – Sophomore; 22 Nathan Broussard – (redshirt) Freshman; 28 Matt Mayes- (redshirt) Sophomore; 34 J.P. Hurrell – Senior; 35 Ted Agu – (redshirt) Sophomore; 37 Robert Mullins – (redshirt) Senior; 40 Chris McCain – Sophomore; 42 Steven Fanua – (redshirt) Junior; 43 Dan Camporeale – (redshirt) Junior; 44 David Wilkerson – (redshirt) Sophomore; 51 Kameron Krebs – (redshirt) Senior; 53 Thomas Wade – Freshman	Defensive backs: 1 Steve Williams – (redshirt) Junior; 2 Marc Anthony – (redshirt) Senior; 3 Kameron Jackson – Sophomore; 4 Avery Sebastian – Sophomore; 5 Michael Lowe – (redshirt) Sophomore; 6 Alex Logan – (redshirt) Junior; 15 Adrian Lee – (redshirt) Sophomore; 18 Joel Willis – (redshirt) Freshman; 20 Isaac Lapite – (redshirt) Sophomore; 21 Stefan McClure – Sophomore; 23 Josh Hill – (redshirt) Senior; 29 Jordan Morgan – Freshman P; 31 Tyré Ellison – (redshirt) Senior; Long snappers: 69 John Sheperdson – Sophomore; 83 Cary Kriegsman – (redshirt) Sophomore; 86 Brandon Madueño – (redshirt) Junior; Placekickers/Punters: 13 Vincenzo D'Amato – Senior PK; 14 Chad Smith – (redshirt) Sophomore P; 36 Benjamin Calder – (redshirt) Freshman PK; 45 James Langford – Junior PK
Sources: 2012 California Golden Bears Football Spring Roster

=== Depth chart ===
Defense

FS
Josh Hill
Michael Lowe

WLB	ILB	ILB	SLB
Chris McCain	Robert Mullins	J.P. Hurrell	⋅
Dan Camporeale	Thomas Wade	Jalen Jefferson	⋅

SS
Alex Logan
Tyré Ellison

CB
Marc Anthony
Adrian Lee

DE	NT	DE
Deandre Coleman	Kendrick Payne	Aaron Tipoti
Keni Kaufusi	Viliami Mosala	Todd Barr

CB
Steve Williams
Kameron Jackson

Offense

WR
Bryce Treggs
Maurice Harris

LT	LG	C	RG	RT
Tyler Rigsbee	Jordan Rigsbee	Brian Schwenke	Chris Adcock	Matt Summers-Gavin
Bill Tyndall	Alejandro Crosthwaite	Chris Adcock	Geoffrey Gibson	Matt Williams

TE
Richard Rodgers
Spencer Hagan

WR
Keenan Allen
Chris Harper

QB
Zach Maynard
Allan Bridgford

RB
Isi Sofele
C.J. Anderson

FB
Eric Stevens
Dasarte Yarnway

Special teams
PK Vincenzo D'Amato
P Cole Leininger
P Steffan Mos
KR Brendan Bigelow / Mike Manuel
PR Keenan Allen / Bryce Treggs
LS John Shepherdson / Brandon Madueño
H Jackson Bouza / Steffan Mos

== Coaching staff ==
- Jeff Tedford – head coach – 11th year
- Jim Michalczik – Offensive coordinator/offensive line – 9th year
- Clancy Pendergast – Defensive coordinator – 3rd year
- Jeff Genyk – Special teams/tight ends – 3rd year
- Marcus Arroyo – Quarterbacks – 2nd year
- Kenwick thompson – Assistant head coach/linebackers – 6th year
- Todd howard – Defensive line – 1st year
- Ron gould – Associate head coach/Run Game coordinator – 16th year
- Wes Chandler – Wide receivers – 1st year
- Ashley Ambrose – Defensive backs – 2nd year
- Ryan mckinley – Defensive Graduate Assistant – 2nd year
- Ben steele – Offensive Administrative Assistant – 2nd year

== Schedule ==
Date	Time	Opponent	Site	TV	Result	Attendance
September 1	12:00 p.m.	Nevada*	California Memorial Stadium; Berkeley, CA	P12N	L 24–31	63,186
September 8	12:00 p.m.	Southern Utah*	California Memorial Stadium; Berkeley, CA	P12N	W 50–31	57,745
September 15	9:00 a.m.	at No. 12 Ohio State*	Ohio Stadium; Columbus, OH	ABC	L 28–35	105,232
September 22	3:00 p.m.	at No. 13 USC	Los Angeles Memorial Coliseum; Los Angeles, CA	P12N	L 9–27	83,421
September 29	1:00 p.m.	Arizona State	California Memorial Stadium; Berkeley, CA	FX	L 17–27	51,634
October 6	7:00 p.m.	No. 25 UCLA^{†}	California Memorial Stadium; Berkeley, CA (rivalry)	P12N	W 43–17	57,643
October 13	7:30 p.m.	at Washington State	Martin Stadium; Pullman, WA	P12N	W 31–17	27,339
October 20	12:00 p.m.	No. 22 Stanford	California Memorial Stadium; Berkeley, CA (Big Game)	FOX	L 3–21	61,024
October 27	6:45 p.m.	at Utah	Rice–Eccles Stadium; Salt Lake City, UT	P12N	L 27–49	45,017
November 2	6:00 p.m.	Washington	Memorial Stadium; Berkeley, CA	ESPN2	L 13–21	42,226
November 10	7:30 p.m.	No. 2 Oregon	Memorial Stadium; Berkeley, CA	ESPN	L 17–59	57,672
November 17	7:30 p.m.	at No. 15 Oregon State	Reser Stadium; Corvallis, OR	P12N	L 14–62	43,779
*Non-conference game; ^{†}Homecoming; Rankings from AP Poll released prior to the game; All times are in Pacific time

== Game summaries ==
=== Nevada ===
	1	2	3	4	Total
Wolf Pack	14	0	7	10	31
Golden Bears	0	7	10	7	24

The Bears reopened California Memorial Stadium with over 11,000 fewer seats on September 1 with a loss to the Nevada Wolf Pack. It was the first home game for the Bears at Memorial Stadium since November 20, 2010 when they took on the Washington Huskies, and to commemorate the occasion the Cal athletic department had a ribbon-cutting ceremony planned before the game. The last time Cal faced Nevada was on September 17, 2010 at Mackay Stadium in Reno, where they lost 52–32. The last time the Bears defeated the Wolf Pack was a 33–15 game in Berkeley. Cal however, had a large advantage in the all-time series against Nevada with a record of 22–2–1 with all of the games being played in Berkeley except for the 2010 game and another meeting back in 1915.

Cal quarterback Zach Maynard was benched for the first three series of the game as punishment for missing a tutoring session earlier during the summer and Allan Bridgford started in his stead. Nevada jumped out to an early lead with an 80 yard scoring drive capped off by a 2-yard run by Stefphon Jefferson. Quarterback Cody Fajardo had a 45-yard run at the end of the quarter to put the Wolf Pack up 14–0 as the quarter wound down. The Bears got on the board in the second quarter with a 37-yard reception by receiver Bryce Treggs. A 31-yard field goal attempt in the final seconds of the quarter missed, making it 14–7 Nevada at the half.

Jefferson had his second touchdown run of the game on a 2-yard run on the Wolf Pack's second possession of the third quarter. The Bears responded on the following drive when receiver Keenan Allen was able to score on a 39-yard run and Cal was able to convert a Nevada fumble recovered on the kick off with a 40-yard field goal. However a Maynard fumble in Nevada territory in the beginning of the quarter led to a 39-yard field goal by the Wolf Pack. Cal tied the game on the ensuing possession with a 13-yard reception by receiver Chris Harper. However Nevada put the game away with a 2-yard run by Jefferson in the final minute and recovered a second Cal fumble on the game's final drive.

Nevada quarterback Cody Fajardo threw for 230 yards and ran for 97, including one of the Wolf Pack's four touchdowns. Running back Stefphon Jefferson accounted for the other three with 145 yards on the ground. Zach Maynard passed for 247 yards and two scores, while the Bears put up a total of 110 yards on the ground, half of Nevada's.

=== Southern Utah ===
	1	2	3	4	Total
Thunderbirds	3	7	7	14	31
Golden Bears	0	20	0	30	50

On September 8 California hosted the Southern Utah Thunderbirds for the first time in program history. The Thunderbirds are members of the Big Sky Conference and are part of the Football Championship Subdivision (FCS). The Bears committed two turnovers in the first quarter but only the second was converted into points in the form of a 40-yard field goal. Cal tied with an 18-yard field goal to open the second quarter and added a pair of touchdowns on a 6-yard run by C.J. Anderson and a 12-yard run by Isi Sofele. A 27-yard field goal came on Cal's final series of the half with Southern Utah adding a touchdown on a 37-yard pass From Brad Sorensen to receiver Cameron Morgan as time expired to make it 20–10 Cal at the half.

The only points in the third quarter came on a 5-yard reception to Southern Utah running back Henna Brown. The fourth quarter saw an explosion in scoring by Cal, leading off with a 19-yard scoring reception by Keenan Allen. Cornerback Marc Anthony then intercepted Sorensen on the ensuing drive for a 61-yard score. A 47-yard field goal was then followed up with a 69-yard punt return for a touchdown by Allen. The Thunderbirds added an 8-yard reception for a touchdown by defensive back Brian Wilson and a 7-yard scoring reception by receiver Fatu Moala, sandwiching a 77-yard touchdown run by Cal running back Daniel Lasco with the PAT missing.

Southern Utah's Brad Sorensen passed for 292 yards and four touchdowns with one pick, with four different receivers catching scores while the ground game was held to 79 yards. Zach Maynard threw for 229 yards, a touchdown and an interception. Isi Sofele had his first 100 yard game of the season with 104 as Cal rushed for 289 yards.

=== Ohio State ===
	1	2	3	4	Total
Golden Bears	7	0	7	14	28
Buckeyes	13	7	0	15	35

The Bears' game on September 15 against the Ohio State Buckeyes was the first meeting between the two schools since 1972 and was California's final non-conference game of the season. California and Ohio State have met six times in the past with the Buckeyes winning five of the six with California's only win the series coming in the 1921 Rose Bowl during one the Bears' five claimed national championship seasons. This game was the first of a home and home series with Ohio State scheduled to visit Berkeley in 2013.

Ohio State scored first on a 55-yard run by quarterback Braxton Miller with the PAT missing. Cal responded with a 19-yard reception by receiver Chris Harper. The Buckeyes came right back with a 25-yard scoring reception by receiver Devin Smith. The sole score of the second quarter was a 1-yard reception by receiver Jake Stoneburner. A 40-yard field goal attempt by the Bears missed to make it 20–7 Ohio State at the half.

Cal scored in the third quarter with an 81-yard run by running back Brendan Bigelow with a 42-yard field goal attempt missing. Maynard had a 1-yard run to open the fourth quarter and the Buckeyes added a 3-yard reception by Stoneburner with Miller successfully rushing for the two-point conversion. Bigelow had his second rushing touchdown of the game with a 59-yard run. Miller was intercepted on the following drive but Cal failed to capitalize on it when a 42-yard field goal missed. The go ahead score came with a 72-yard scoring reception by Smith and Ohio State picked off Maynard on the ensuing drive to hold off the Bears.

Ohio State's Braxton Miller threw for 249 yards and four scores with an interception and receiver Devin Smith had 145 yards with two touchdown receptions. Zach Maynard passed for 280 yards, a score and a pick, and running back Brandon Bigelow had 160 yards on the ground with two scores.

=== USC ===
	1	2	3	4	Total
Golden Bears	0	3	6	0	9
#13 Trojans	7	10	0	10	27

California will travel to the Los Angeles Memorial Coliseum on September 22 to face the USC Trojans for the two schools' 100th meeting. The Trojans lead the all-time series 66–29–5 with the Trojans winning the last meeting 30–9 in San Francisco. The last California win in the series came in 2003 after the Bears defeated the third ranked Trojans 34–31 in three overtimes.

1st quarter scoring: USC – Silas Redd 33-yard run (Andre Heidari kick)

2nd quarter scoring: CAL – Vincen D'Amato 24-yard field goal; USC – Marqise Lee 11-yard pass from Matt Barkley (Heidari kick); USC – Heidari 40-yard field goal

3rd quarter scoring: CAL – D'Amato 26-yard field goal; CAL – D'Amato 35-yard field goal

4th quarter scoring: USC – Heidari 41-yard field goal; USC – Lee 3-yard pass from Barkley (Heidari kick)

=== Arizona State ===
	1	2	3	4	Total
Sun Devils	7	10	3	7	27
Golden Bears	0	7	3	7	17

California will meet the Arizona State Sun Devils on September 29 at California Memorial Stadium for the first Pac-12 home game of the season. The Golden Bears lead the all-time series 17–14 with California winning the last meeting 47–38 in Tempe. Under head coach Jeff Tedford, California has gone 8–1 against the Sun Devils and have won the last four meetings.

1st quarter scoring: ARIZ – Darwin Rogers 1-yard pass from Taylor Kelly (Alex Garoutte kick).

2nd quarter scoring: CAL – Isi Sofele 24-yard run (Vincenzo D'Amato kick); ARIZ – Garoutte 28-yard field goal; ARIZ – Kevin Ozier 9-yard pass from Kelly (Garoutte kick).

3rd quarter scoring: ARIZ – Garoutte 33-yard field goal; CAL – D'Amato 35-yard field goal.

4th quarter scoring: CAL – Keenan Allen 10-pass from Zach Maynard (D'Amato Kick); ARIZ – Ozier 22-yard pass from Kelly (Garoutte Kick)

=== UCLA ===
	1	2	3	4	Total
#25 Bruins	7	0	7	3	17
Golden Bears	3	13	13	14	43

California will meet the UCLA Bruins on October 6 at California Memorial Stadium for the University of California's annual Joe Roth Memorial game and homecoming game. The Bruins lead the all-time series 50–31–1 with UCLA winning the last meeting 31–14 in Pasadena. The Bruins, however, have not won in Berkeley since the 1998 season with the last California victory coming in 2010 at Memorial Stadium. The California athletic department has scheduled the official rededication of the stadium during halftime with a stadium-wide card stunt and a combined halftime show with the University of California Marching Band and the UCLA Bruin Marching Band. This will be the first combined show with the two bands in decades. The stadium, which was originally dedicated as a memorial to the lives of Californian who lost their lives in World War I, will be officially rededicated in memory of all of the Californians who have lost their lives in war. Terry Leyden is the referee for the game.

1st quarter scoring: UCLA – Cassius Marsh 4-yard pass from Brett Hundley (Ka'i Fairbairn kick); CAL – D'Amato, Vincen 26-yard field goal.

2nd quarter scoring: CAL – C. J. Anderson 5-yard pass from Zach Maynard (D'Amato kick); CAL – Keenan Allen 8-yard pass from Maynard (D'Amato kick blockdd)

3rd quarter scoring: CAL – Brendan Bigelow 32-yard pass from Maynard (D'Amato kick); UCLA – Joseph Fauria 3-yard pass from Hundley (Fairbairn kick); CAL – Allen 34-yard pass from Maynard (D'Amato kick blockdd)

4th quarter scoring: UCLA – Fairbairn 29-yard field goal; CAL – Maynard 1-yard run (D'Amato kick); CAL – Anderson 68-yard run (D'Amato kick).

=== Washington State ===
	1	2	3	4	Total
Golden Bears	7	7	10	7	31
Cougars	0	3	7	7	17

California traveled to Martin Stadium on October 13 to face the Washington State Cougars for the Bears' first Pac-12 North divisional opponent. The Golden Bears lead the all-time series 43–25–5 with California winning the last meeting 30–7 in San Francisco. California has won seven straight games against the Cougars with the last WSU win coming in 2002.

=== Stanford ===
	1	2	3	4	Total
#22 Cardinal	7	14	0	0	21
Golden Bears	0	3	0	0	3

For the first time since 1892, the annual Big Game between the California Golden Bears and the Stanford Cardinal was not played at the end of the season in either November or December. The new Pac-12 television deal that was signed in 2011 has been faulted for the move because it has created many scheduling issues. Also, both universities have refused to play their rivalry game on the Saturday after Thanksgiving. The reasoning for not wanting the Big Game after Thanksgiving is that many students are out of town for the holiday and that because of the short week, many longstanding events that are performed throughout the week leading up to the game would not be possible. Because it is an even numbered year, Stanford will travel to California Memorial Stadium for the 115th Big Game and the outcome will determine who wins the Stanford Axe. Jeff Tedford, however, in his career at California has won seven of the last ten Big Games.

=== Utah ===
	1	2	3	4	Total
Golden Bears	3	3	7	14	27
Utes	14	14	14	7	49

California traveled to the Rice-Eccles Stadium on October 27 to face the Utah Utes for the Bears' first trip to Salt Lake City with Utah as a conference opponent. The Golden Bears lead the all-time series 5–3 with California winning the last meeting 34–10 in San Francisco. The last time California travelled to Salt Lake City to face the Utes, the all-time attendance record at Rice-Eccles Stadium (46,768) was set.

Utah senior running back Reggie Dunn set an NCAA record with two 100-yard kickoff returns for touchdowns.

=== Washington ===
	1	2	3	4	Total
Huskies	7	0	7	7	21
Golden Bears	0	7	6	0	13

California met the Washington Huskies on November 2 at California Memorial Stadium for a Friday night, primetime matchup on ESPN2. The Huskies lead the all-time series 49–38–4 with Washington winning the last meeting 31–23 in Seattle. The last California win came during the 2008 season and prior to that, the Bears won five straight against the Huskies from 2002 to 2006.

=== Oregon ===
	1	2	3	4	Total
#3 Ducks	14	10	14	21	59
Golden Bears	7	3	7	0	17

California met the Oregon Ducks on November 10 at California Memorial Stadium for a meeting with the preseason, north division favorites. The Golden Bears lead the all-time series 40–32–2 with Oregon winning the last meeting 43–15 in Eugene. Under head coach Jeff Tedford, the Bears have only lost once to the Ducks in Berkeley. The only home defeat came in 2010 after an incredibly close 15–13 loss to the then-#1 ranked Ducks.

1st quarter scoring: ORE – Colt Lyerla 10 Yd Pass From Marcus Mariota (Alejandro Maldonado Kick); CAL – Darius Powe 10 Yd Pass From Allan Bridgford (Vincenzo D'Amato Kick); ORE – Byron Marshall 3 Yd Run (Maldonado Kick)

2nd quarter scoring: CAL – D'Amato 27 Yd Field Goal; ORE – Maldonado 26 Yd Field Goal; ORE – Josh Huff 10 Yd Pass From Marcus Mariota (Maldonado Kick)

3rd quarter scoring: CAL – Isi Sofele 4 Yd Run (D'Amato Kick); ORE – Josh Huff 35 Yd Pass From Marcus Mariota (Maldonado Kick); ORE – Josh Huff 39 Yd Pass From Marcus Mariota (Maldonado Kick)

4th quarter scoring: ORE – Colt Lyerla 14 Yd Pass From Marcus Mariota (Maldonado Kick); ORE – Will Murphy 7 Yd Pass From Marcus Mariota (Maldonado Kick); ORE – B.J. Kelley 18 Yd Pass From Bryan Bennett (Maldonado Kick)

=== Oregon State ===
	1	2	3	4	Total
Golden Bears	7	0	7	0	14
#16 Beavers	14	21	14	13	62

California traveled to the Reser Stadium to face the Oregon State Beavers for the Bears' final game of the regular season. The Golden Bears led the all-time series 34–30–0 with California winning the last meeting 23–6 in San Francisco. The two schools have split their last two meetings and in the last ten years, Oregon State has compiled a 7–3 record against California since 2005.

1st quarter scoring: ORST – Markus Wheaton 11 Yd Pass From Sean Mannion (Trevor Romaine Kick); CAL – Isi Sofele 9 Yd Run (Vincenzo D'Amato Kick); ORST – Tyler Anderson 1 Yd Run (Trevor Romaine Kick)

2nd quarter scoring: ORST – Brandin Cooks 48 Yd Pass From Sean Mannion (Trevor Romaine Kick); ORST – Connor Hamlett 14 Yd Pass From Sean Mannion (Trevor Romaine Kick); ORST – Micah Hatfield 6 Yd Pass From Sean Mannion (Trevor Romaine Kick)

3rd quarter scoring: ORST – Storm Woods 1 Yd Run (Trevor Romaine Kick); ORST – Terron Ward 47 Yd Run (Trevor Romaine Kick); CAL – Allan Bridgford 1 Yd Run (Vincenzo D'Amato Kick)

4th quarter scoring: ORST – Terron Ward 17 Yd Run (Pat Failed); ORST – Malcolm Agnew 8 Yd Pass From Richie Harrington (Trevor Romaine Kick)

== Postseason ==
Three days after the close of the season Tedford was let go on November 20. On December 5, Louisiana Tech head coach Sonny Dykes was announced as his successor. On the same day, wide receiver Keenan Allen, who had become Cal's all-time leader in receptions during the season, announced that he would forgo his senior season and enter the 2013 NFL draft. Several members of Dykes' coaching staff at Louisiana Tech joined him at Cal for the same positions they had coached with the Bulldogs: offensive coordinator Tony Franklin, assistant head coach/wide receivers coach Rob Likens, running backs coach Pierre Ingram, and special teams coordinator/inside receivers coach Mark Tommerdahl. Longtime running backs coach Ron Gould, who had been with the program since 1997 and served under Tedford's predecessor, Tom Holmoe, left to become the head coach at UC Davis.

== Rankings ==
Ranking movements Legend: — = Not ranked
	Week															
Poll	Pre	1	2	3	4	5	6	7	8	9	10	11	12	13	14	Final
AP	—	—	—	—	—	—	—	—	—	—	—	—	—	—	—	—
Coaches	—	—	—	—	—	—	—	—	—	—	—	—	—	—	—	—
Harris	Not released						—	—	—	—	—	—	—	—	—	Not released
BCS	Not released							—	—	—	—	—	—	—	—	Not released

== Statistics ==
=== Scores by quarter (all opponents) ===
	1	2	3	4	Total
California	34	77	76	93	280
All Opponents	107	96	80	114	397

=== Scores by quarter (Pac-12 opponents) ===
	1	2	3	4	Total
California	27	46	59	42	174
Pac-12 Opponents	77	82	66	75	300
