= 2012 Oregon Ducks football team =

American college football season

2012 Oregon Ducks football

Pac-12 North Division co-champion Fiesta Bowl champion

Fiesta Bowl, W 35–17 vs. Kansas State
- Conference: Pac-12 Conference
- North Division

Ranking
- Coaches: No. 2
- AP: No. 2
- Record: 12–1 (8–1 Pac-12)
- Head coach: Chip Kelly (4th season)
- Offensive coordinator: Mark Helfrich (4th season)
- Offensive scheme: No-huddle spread option
- Defensive coordinator: Nick Aliotti (16th season)
- Base defense: Hybrid 3–4
- Captain: Game captains
- Home stadium: Autzen Stadium

2012 Pac-12 Conference football standings
| | Conf. | | | Overall |
| Team | W | | L | W | | L |
|---|---|---|---|---|---|---|
North Division
| No. 7 Stanford xy$ | 8 | – | 1 | 12 | – | 2 |
| No. 2 Oregon x% | 8 | – | 1 | 12 | – | 1 |
| No. 20 Oregon State | 6 | – | 3 | 9 | – | 4 |
| Washington | 5 | – | 4 | 7 | – | 6 |
| California | 2 | – | 7 | 3 | – | 9 |
| Washington State | 1 | – | 8 | 3 | – | 9 |
South Division
| UCLA xy | 6 | – | 3 | 9 | – | 5 |
| Arizona State | 5 | – | 4 | 8 | – | 5 |
| USC | 5 | – | 4 | 7 | – | 6 |
| Arizona | 4 | – | 5 | 8 | – | 5 |
| Utah | 3 | – | 6 | 5 | – | 7 |
| Colorado | 1 | – | 8 | 1 | – | 11 |
Championship: Stanford 27, UCLA 24
$ – BCS representative as conference champion; % – BCS at-large representative; x – Division champion/co-champions; y – Championship game participant; Rankings from AP Poll

The 2012 Oregon Ducks football team represented the University of Oregon in the 2012 NCAA Division I FBS football season. The team played their home games at Autzen Stadium for the 46th straight year, and was coached by Chip Kelly in his fourth and final year at Oregon. They are a member of the Pac-12 Conference in the North Division.

For the fifth straight season, Oregon swept all of their regional rivals in the Pac-12: Oregon State, Washington, and Washington State.

== Recruiting ==
College recruiting (2012)
| Name | Hometown | School | Height | Weight | Commit date |
|---|---|---|---|---|---|
| Alex Balducci; DE | Portland, OR | Central Catholic HS | 6 ft 4 in (1.93 m) | 245 lb (111 kg) | n/a |
| Alex Balducci; DE | Recruit ratings: Scout: Rivals: | | | | |
| Arik Armstead; OT | Elk Grove, CA | Pleasant Grove HS | 6 ft 8 in (2.03 m) | 275 lb (125 kg) | n/a |
| Arik Armstead; OT | Recruit ratings: Scout: Rivals: | | | | |
| Bralon Addison; WR | Missouri City, TX | Hightower HS | 5 ft 10 in (1.78 m) | 180 lb (82 kg) | n/a |
| Bralon Addison; WR | Recruit ratings: Scout: Rivals: | | | | |
| Brett Bafaro; OLB | Hillsboro, OR | Liberty HS | 6 ft 2 in (1.88 m) | 220 lb (100 kg) | 4.5 |
| Brett Bafaro; OLB | Recruit ratings: Scout: Rivals: | | | | |
| Byron Marshall; RB | San Jose, CA | Valley Christian | 5 ft 10 in (1.78 m) | 195 lb (88 kg) | n/a |
| Byron Marshall; RB | Recruit ratings: Scout: Rivals: | | | | |
| Chance Allen; WR | Missouri City, TX | Elkins HS | 6 ft 3 in (1.91 m) | 191 lb (87 kg) | n/a |
| Chance Allen; WR | Recruit ratings: Scout: Rivals: | | | | |
| Cody Carriger; ODE | Butte, MT | Butte HS | 6 ft 6 in (1.98 m) | 230 lb (100 kg) | n/a |
| Cody Carriger; ODE | Recruit ratings: Scout: Rivals: | | | | |
| DeForest Buckner; DE | Honolulu, HI | Punahoe School | 6 ft 7 in (2.01 m) | 250 lb (110 kg) | n/a |
| DeForest Buckner; DE | Recruit ratings: Scout: Rivals: | | | | |
| Dwayne Stanford; WR | Cincinnati, OH | Taft HS | 6 ft 4 in (1.93 m) | 195 lb (88 kg) | 4.5 |
| Dwayne Stanford; WR | Recruit ratings: Scout: Rivals: | | | | |
| Dylan Ausherman; P | Visalia, CA | College of the Sequoias | 6 ft 4 in (1.93 m) | 180 lb (82 kg) | n/a |
| Dylan Ausherman; P | Recruit ratings: Scout: Rivals: | | | | |
| Eric Amoako; S | Arlington, TX | Martin HS | 5 ft 11 in (1.80 m) | 195 lb (88 kg) | 4.49 |
| Eric Amoako; S | Recruit ratings: Scout: Rivals: | | | | |
| Evan Baylis; TE | Aurora, CO | Grandview HS | 6 ft 6 in (1.98 m) | 220 lb (100 kg) | n/a |
| Evan Baylis; TE | Recruit ratings: Scout: Rivals: | | | | |
| Jake Rodrigues; QB | Rocklin, CA | Whitney HS | 6 ft 3 in (1.91 m) | 215 lb (98 kg) | n/a |
| Jake Rodrigues; QB | Recruit ratings: Scout: Rivals: | | | | |
| Jeff Lockie; QB | Danville, CA | Monte Vista HS | 6 ft 2 in (1.88 m) | 185 lb (84 kg) | 4.68 |
| Jeff Lockie; QB | Recruit ratings: Scout: Rivals: | | | | |
| Kyle Long; OT | Mission Viejo, CA | Saddleback HS | 6 ft 7 in (2.01 m) | 290 lb (130 kg) | |
| Kyle Long; OT | Recruit ratings: Scout: Rivals: | | | | |
| Oshay Dunmore; S | Newport, OR | Newport HS | 6 ft 2 in (1.88 m) | 200 lb (91 kg) | n/a |
| Oshay Dunmore; S | Recruit ratings: Scout: Rivals: | | | | |
| Pharaoh Brown; TE | Lyndhurst, OH | Brush HS | 6 ft 6 in (1.98 m) | 220 lb (100 kg) | n/a |
| Pharaoh Brown; TE | Recruit ratings: Scout: Rivals: | | | | |
| Reggie Daniels; S | Chandler, AZ | Hamilton HS | 6 ft 2 in (1.88 m) | 185 lb (84 kg) | n/a |
| Reggie Daniels; S | Recruit ratings: Scout: Rivals: | | | | |
| Stephen Amoako; S | Arlington, TX | Martin HS | 5 ft 11 in (1.80 m) | 195 lb (88 kg) | n/a |
| Stephen Amoako; S | Recruit ratings: Scout: Rivals: | | | | |
| Stetzon Bair; DE | Council Bluffs, IA | Iowa Western | 6 ft 7 in (2.01 m) | 265 lb (120 kg) | n/a |
| Stetzon Bair; DE | Recruit ratings: Scout: Rivals: | | | | |
| Terrance Daniel; OG | Oakland, CA | Bishop O Dowd HS | 6 ft 5 in (1.96 m) | 220 lb (100 kg) | n/a |
| Terrance Daniel; OG | Recruit ratings: Scout: Rivals: | | | | |
Overall recruit ranking:
Note: In many cases, Scout, Rivals, 247Sports, On3, and ESPN may conflict in their listings of height and weight.; In these cases, the average was taken. ESPN grades are on a 100-point scale.; Sources: "2012 Team Ranking". Rivals.com.

== Schedule ==
| Date | Time | Opponent | Rank | Site | TV | Result | Attendance | Source |
|---|---|---|---|---|---|---|---|---|
| September 1 | 7:30 pm | Arkansas State* | No. 5 | Autzen Stadium; Eugene, OR | ESPN | W 57–34 | 56,144 | |
| September 8 | 3:30 pm | Fresno State* | No. 4 | Autzen Stadium; Eugene, OR | P12N | W 42–25 | 55,755 | |
| September 15 | 12:00 pm | Tennessee Tech* | No. 4 | Autzen Stadium; Eugene, OR | P12N | W 63–14 | 57,091 | |
| September 22 | 7:30 pm | No. 22 Arizona | No. 3 | Autzen Stadium; Eugene, OR | ESPN | W 49–0 | 58,334 | |
| September 29 | 7:30 pm | at Washington State | No. 2 | CenturyLink Field; Seattle, WA | ESPN2 | W 51–26 | 60,929 | |
| October 6 | 7:30 pm | No. 23 Washington | No. 2 | Autzen Stadium; Eugene, OR (rivalry) | ESPN | W 52–21 | 58,792 | |
| October 18 | 6:00 pm | at Arizona State | No. 2 | Sun Devil Stadium; Tempe, AZ | ESPN | W 43–21 | 71,004 | |
| October 27 | 12:00 pm | Colorado^{†} | No. 2 | Autzen Stadium; Eugene, OR | P12N | W 70–14 | 57,521 | |
| November 3 | 4:00 pm | at No. 18 USC | No. 2 | Los Angeles Memorial Coliseum; Los Angeles, CA (rivalry) | FOX | W 62–51 | 93,607 | |
| November 10 | 7:30 pm | at California | No. 2 | California Memorial Stadium; Berkeley, CA | ESPN | W 59–17 | 57,672 | |
| November 17 | 5:00 pm | No. 14 Stanford | No. 1 | Autzen Stadium; Eugene, OR (rivalry, College GameDay) | ABC | L 14–17 ^{OT} | 58,792 | |
| November 24 | 12:00 pm | at No. 16 Oregon State | No. 5 | Reser Stadium; Corvallis, OR (Civil War) | P12N | W 48–24 | 47,249 | |
| January 3, 2013 | 5:30 pm | vs. No. 5 Kansas State* | No. 4 | University of Phoenix Stadium; Glendale, AZ (Fiesta Bowl) | ESPN | W 35–17 | 70,242 | |
*Non-conference game; ^{†}Homecoming; Rankings from AP Poll released prior to the game; All times are in Pacific time

== Game summaries ==
=== Arkansas State ===
| Team | 1 | 2 | 3 | 4 | Total |
|---|---|---|---|---|---|
| Arkansas St | 0 | 10 | 10 | 14 | 34 |
| • Oregon | 29 | 21 | 0 | 7 | 57 |

- Date: September 1
- Location: Autzen Stadium, Eugene, Oregon
- Game start: 10:30 p.m. EST

Scoring summary
| 1 | 13:22 | ORE | Kenjon Barner 4 yard run (Dion Jordan pass from Jackson Rice) | Oregon 8–0 |
| 1 | 9:19 | ORE | De'Anthony Thomas 12 yard pass from Marcus Mariota (Rob Beard kick) | Oregon 15–0 |
| 1 | 7:57 | ORE | Josh Huff 4 yard pass from Marcus Mariota (Rob Beard kick) | Oregon 22–0 |
| 1 | 2:27 | ORE | Kenjon Barner 17 yard run (Rob Beard kick) | Oregon 29–0 |
| 2 | 13:57 | ARST | Brian Davis 43 yard field goal | Oregon 29–3 |
| 2 | 12:57 | ORE | De'Anthony Thomas 12 yard pass from Marcus Mariota (Rob Beard kick) | Oregon 36–3 |
| 2 | 10:45 | ORE | De'Anthony Thomas 33 yard run (Rob Beard kick) | Oregon 43–3 |
| 2 | 7:06 | ORE | Byron Marshall 3 yard run (Rob Beard kick) | Oregon 50–3 |
| 2 | 3:20 | ARST | Julian Jones 72 yard pass from Ryan Aplin (Brian Davis kick) | Oregon 50–10 |
| 3 | 10:46 | ARST | Brian Davis 29 yard field goal | Oregon 50–13 |
| 3 | 1:53 | ARST | Josh Jarboe 6 yard pass from Ryan Aplin (Brian Davis kick) | Oregon 50–20 |
| 4 | 11:36 | ORE | Rahsaan Vaughn 7 yard pass from Bryan Bennett (Rob Beard kick) | Oregon 57–20 |
| 4 | 8:48 | ARST | Carlos McCants 38 yard pass from Ryan Aplin (Brian Davis kick) | Oregon 57–27 |
| 4 | 4:30 | ARST | Ryan Aplin 1 yard run (Brian Davis kick) | Oregon 57–34 |

=== Fresno State ===
| Team | 1 | 2 | 3 | 4 | Total |
|---|---|---|---|---|---|
| Fresno St | 3 | 3 | 10 | 9 | 25 |
| • Oregon | 14 | 21 | 0 | 7 | 42 |

- Date: September 8
- Location: Autzen Stadium, Eugene, Oregon

1st quarter scoring: FRES – Quentin Breshears 39 Yd field goal; ORE – De'Anthony Thomas 39 Yd Run (Rob Beard Kick); ORE – Kenjon Barner 3 Yd run (Beard kick)

2nd quarter scoring: ORE – Colt Lyerla 22 Yd Pass From Marcus Mariota (Beard Kick); ORE – De'Anthony Thomas 51 Yd Run (Beard Kick); ORE – Kenjon Barner 3 Yd Run (Beard Kick); FRES – Quentin Breshears 43 Yd field goal

3rd quarter scoring: FRES – Isaiah Burse 18 Yd Pass From Derek Carr (Breshears Kick); FRES – Quentin Breshears 25 Yd field goal

4th quarter scoring: FRES – Quentin Breshears 37 Yd field goal; ORE – Kenjon Barner 16 Yd Run (Beard Kick); FRES – Robbie Rouse 2 Yd Run (Two-Point Pass Conversion Failed)

=== Tennessee Tech ===
| Team | 1 | 2 | 3 | 4 | Total |
|---|---|---|---|---|---|
| Tennessee Tech | 7 | 0 | 7 | 0 | 14 |
| • Oregon | 21 | 14 | 21 | 7 | 63 |

- Date: September 15
- Location: Autzen Stadium, Eugene, Oregon

1st quarter scoring: TNTC – Da'Rick Rogers 23 Yd Pass From Tre Lamb (Zachary Sharp Kick); ORE – Kenjon Barner 1 Yd Run (Rob Beard Kick); ORE – De'Anthony Thomas 59 Yd Run (Beard Kick); ORE – Jake Fisher 1 Yd Pass From Marcus Mariota (Beard Kick)

2nd quarter scoring: ORE – Colt Lyerla 4 Yd Pass From Marcus Mariota (Beard Kick); ORE – De'Anthony Thomas 16 Yd Pass From Marcus Mariota (Beard Kick)

3rd quarter scoring: ORE – Keanon Lowe 3 Yd Pass From Marcus Mariota (Beard Kick); ORE – Bryan Bennett 4 Yd Run (Beard Kick); TNTC – Doug Page 6 Yd Pass From Darian Stone (Sharp Kick); ORE – Bryan Bennett 6 Yd Run (Beard Kick)

4th quarter scoring: ORE – Byron Marshall 4 Yd Run (Beard Kick)

=== Arizona ===
| Team | 1 | 2 | 3 | 4 | Total |
|---|---|---|---|---|---|
| Arizona | 0 | 0 | 0 | 0 | 0 |
| • Oregon | 7 | 6 | 15 | 21 | 49 |

- Date: September 22
- Location: Autzen Stadium, Eugene, Oregon

1st quarter scoring: ORE – Daryle Hawkins 17 Yd Pass From Marcus Mariota (Rob Beard Kick)

2nd quarter scoring: ORE – Rob Beard 27 Yd field goal; ORE – Rob Beard 41 Yd field goal

3rd quarter scoring: ORE – Colt Lyerla 1 Yd Run (Jackson Rice Pass To Rob Beard For Two-Point Conversion); ORE – Bralon Addison 55 Yd Pass From Marcus Mariota (Beard Kick)

4th quarter scoring: ORE – Ifo Ekpre-Olomu 54 Yd Interception Return (Beard Kick); ORE – Bryan Bennett 8 Yd Run (Beard Kick); ORE – Troy Hill 29 Yd Interception Return (Beard Kick)

=== Washington State ===
| Team | 1 | 2 | 3 | 4 | Total |
|---|---|---|---|---|---|
| • Oregon | 20 | 3 | 21 | 7 | 51 |
| Washington St | 9 | 10 | 0 | 7 | 26 |

- Date: September 29
- Location: CenturyLink Field, Seattle, Washington

1st quarter scoring: ORE – Kenjon Barner 22 Yd Run (Two-Point Pass Conversion Failed); WSU – Andrew Furney 18 Yd field goal; ORE – Marcus Mariota 13 Yd Run (Rob Beard Kick); ORE – Kenjon Barner 30 Yd Pass From Marcus Mariota (Beard Kick); WSU – Carl Winston 2 Yd Run (Pat Failed)

2nd quarter scoring: WSU – Andrew Furney 20 Yd field goal; ORE – Rob Beard 34 Yd field goal; WSU – Brett Bartolone 26 Yd Pass From Connor Halliday (Furney Kick)

3rd quarter scoring: ORE – De'Anthony Thomas 4 Yd Run (Beard Kick); ORE – Avery Patterson 34 Yd Interception Return (Beard Kick); ORE – Kenjon Barner 10 Yd Run (Beard Kick)

4th quarter scoring: ORE – Kenjon Barner 80 Yd Run (Beard Kick); WSU – Marquess Wilson 25 Yd Pass From Jeff Tuel (Furney Kick)

=== Washington ===
| Team | 1 | 2 | 3 | 4 | Total |
|---|---|---|---|---|---|
| Washington | 0 | 7 | 7 | 7 | 21 |
| • Oregon | 21 | 14 | 3 | 14 | 52 |

- Date: October 6
- Location: Autzen Stadium, Eugene, Oregon

1st quarter scoring: ORE – De'Anthony Thomas 16 Yd Run (Rob Beard Kick); ORE – Keanon Lowe 21 Yd Pass From Marcus Mariota (Beard Kick); ORE – Avery Patterson 43 Yd Interception Return (Beard Kick)

2nd quarter scoring: WASH – Bishop Sankey 1 Yd Run (Travis Coons Kick); ORE – Colt Lyerla 10 Yd Pass From Marcus Mariota (Rob Beard Kick); ORE – Josh Huff 34 Yd Pass From Marcus Mariota (Beard Kick)

3rd quarter scoring: ORE – Rob Beard 28 Yd field goal; WASH – Bishop Sankey 6 Yd Run (Coons Kick)

4th quarter scoring: ORE – Colt Lyerla 13 Yd Pass From Marcus Mariota (Beard Kick); ORE – Byron Marshall 4 Yd Run (Beard Kick); WASH – Erich Wilson II 1 Yd Run (Coons Kick)

=== Arizona State ===
| Team | 1 | 2 | 3 | 4 | Total |
|---|---|---|---|---|---|
| • Oregon | 22 | 21 | 0 | 0 | 43 |
| Arizona St | 7 | 0 | 0 | 14 | 21 |

- Date: October 18
- Location: Sun Devil Stadium, Tempe, Arizona

1st quarter scoring: ASU – Kevin Ozier 28 Yd Pass From Taylor Kelly (Alex Garoutte Kick); ORE – Kenjon Barner 71 Yd Run (Jackson Rice Pass To Rob Beard For Two-Point Conversion); ORE – Bralon Addison 6 Yd Pass From Marcus Mariota (Beard Kick); ORE – Marcus Mariota 2 Yd Pass From Bryan Bennett (Beard Kick)

2nd quarter scoring: ORE – Kenjon Barner 1 Yd Run (Beard Kick); ORE – Marcus Mariota 86 Yd Run (Beard Kick); ORE – Kenjon Barner 1 Yd Run (Beard Kick)

3rd quarter scoring:

4th quarter scoring: ASU – Anthony Jones 36 Yd Interception Return (Garoutte Kick); ASU – D. J. Foster 23 Yd Pass From Michael Eubank (Garoutte Kick)

=== Colorado ===
| Team | 1 | 2 | 3 | 4 | Total |
|---|---|---|---|---|---|
| Colorado | 0 | 0 | 14 | 0 | 14 |
| • Oregon | 28 | 28 | 14 | 0 | 70 |

- Date: October 27
- Location: Autzen Stadium, Eugene, Oregon

1st quarter scoring: ORE – Kenjon Barner 1 Yd Run (Rob Beard Kick); ORE – De'Anthony Thomas 9 Yd Run (Beard Kick); ORE – Marcus Mariota 5 Yd Run (Beard Kick); ORE – Bralon Addison 16 Yd Pass From Marcus Mariota (Beard Kick)

2nd quarter scoring: ORE – Kenjon Barner 24 Yd Run (Beard Kick); ORE – De'Anthony Thomas 73 Yd Punt Return (Beard Kick); ORE – Daryle Hawkins 7 Yd Pass From Marcus Mariota (Rob Beard Kick); ORE – Bryan Bennett 6 Yd Run (Beard Kick)

3rd quarter scoring: COLO – Christian Powell 1 Yd Run (Will Oliver Kick); COLO – Christian Powell 20 Yd Run (Oliver Kick); ORE – Bryan Bennett 3 Yd Run (Beard Kick); ORE – Bryan Bennett 17 Yd Run (Beard Kick)

4th quarter scoring:

=== USC ===
#2 Oregon Ducks (8–0) at #18 USC Trojans (6–2)

| Quarter | 1 | 2 | 3 | 4 | Total |
|---|---|---|---|---|---|
| Oregon | 14 | 20 | 14 | 14 | 62 |
| USC | 3 | 21 | 14 | 13 | 51 |

at Los Angeles Memorial Coliseum • Los Angeles, California

- Date: November 3
- Game time: 4:00 p.m. PDT
- Game weather: Hazy • 73 °F (23 °C) • Wind W 5 miles per hour (8.0 km/h; 4.3 kn)
- Game attendance: 93,607
- Referee: Jay Strichez
- TV announcers (Fox): Gus Johnson, Charles Davis, and Julie Alexandria
- Box Score

Game information

Oregon

- Marcus Mariota
  20/23, 304 Yds, 4 TD
- Kenjon Barner
  38 Rush, 321 Yds, 5 TD
- Josh Huff
  6 Rec, 125 Yds, 2 TD

USC

- Matt Barkley
  35/54, 484 Yds, 5 TD, 2 INT
- Silas Redd
  18 Rush, 92 Yds, 2 TD
- Nelson Agholor
  6 Rec, 162 Yds, TD

Scoring summary

| Quarter | Time | Drive | | | Team | Scoring information | Score | |
| Quarter | Time | Plays | Yards | TOP | Team | Scoring information | ORE | USC |
|---|---|---|---|---|---|---|---|---|
| 1 | 13:55 | 5 | 75 | 1:05 | Oregon | De'Anthony Thomas 16-yard touchdown reception from Marcus Mariota, Rob Beard kick good | 7 | 0 |
| 1 | 8:04 | 13 | 66 | 5:44 | USC | 39-yard field goal by Andre Heidari | 7 | 3 |
| 1 | 4:53 | 9 | 75 | 3:11 | Oregon | Josh Huff 21-yard touchdown reception from Marcus Mariota, Rob Beard kick good | 14 | 3 |
| 2 | 14:48 | 10 | 80 | 2:38 | Oregon | Kenjon Barner 27-yard touchdown run, Rob Beard kick good | 21 | 3 |
| 2 | 14:36 | 1 | 75 | 0:12 | USC | Marqise Lee 75-yard touchdown reception from Matt Barkley, Andre Heidari kick good | 21 | 10 |
| 2 | 11:27 | 10 | 88 | 3:02 | Oregon | Kenjon Barner 5-yard touchdown run, Rob Beard kick no good (blocked) | 27 | 10 |
| 2 | 5:59 | 12 | 77 | 5:20 | USC | Robert Woods 7-yard touchdown reception from Matt Barkley, Andre Heidari kick good | 27 | 17 |
| 2 | 5:03 | 3 | 81 | 0:50 | Oregon | Daryle Hawkins 14-yard touchdown reception from Marcus Mariota, Rob Beard kick good | 34 | 17 |
| 2 | 2:37 | 1 | 76 | 0:12 | USC | Nelson Agholor 76-yard touchdown reception from Matt Barkley, Andre Heidari kick good | 34 | 24 |
| 3 | 9:59 | 11 | 65 | 5:01 | USC | Silas Redd 2-yard touchdown run, Andre Heidari kick good | 34 | 31 |
| 3 | 5:14 | 13 | 75 | 4:45 | Oregon | Kenjon Barner 9-yard touchdown run, Rob Beard kick good | 41 | 31 |
| 3 | 2:32 | 5 | 16 | 2:31 | USC | Silas Redd 3-yard touchdown run, Andre Heidari kick good | 41 | 38 |
| 3 | 1:19 | 4 | 74 | 1:06 | Oregon | Josh Huff 36-yard touchdown reception from Marcus Mariota, Rob Beard kick good | 48 | 38 |
| 4 | 9:15 | 12 | 85 | 4:56 | Oregon | Kenjon Barner 5-yard touchdown run, Rob Beard kick good | 55 | 38 |
| 4 | 5:27 | 9 | 53 | 3:41 | USC | Randall Telfer 3-yard touchdown reception from Matt Barkley, Andre Heidari kick good | 55 | 45 |
| 4 | 1:58 | 3 | 20 | 1:02 | Oregon | Kenjon Barner 22-yard touchdown run, Rob Beard kick good | 62 | 45 |
| 4 | 0:01 | 7 | 65 | 1:51 | USC | Marqise Lee 3-yard touchdown reception from Matt Barkley, 2-point pass failed | 62 | 51 |
| "TOP" = time of possession. For other American football terms, see Glossary of American football. | | | | | | | 62 | 51 |

Oregon was the first team to score 60 points on USC in 124 years. On November 8, USC was reprimanded and fined by the conference for illegally deflated game balls by a student manager during the Oregon game.

=== California ===
| Team | 1 | 2 | 3 | 4 | Total |
|---|---|---|---|---|---|
| • Oregon | 14 | 10 | 14 | 21 | 59 |
| California | 7 | 3 | 7 | 0 | 17 |

- Date: November 10
- Location: Memorial Stadium, Berkeley, California

1st quarter scoring: ORE – Colt Lyerla 10 Yd Pass From Marcus Mariota (Alejandro Maldonado Kick); CAL – Darius Powe 10 Yd Pass From Allan Bridgford (Vincenzo D'Amato Kick); ORE – Byron Marshall 3 Yd Run (Maldonado Kick)

2nd quarter scoring: CAL – D'Amato 27 Yd Field Goal; ORE – Maldonado 26 Yd Field Goal; ORE – Josh Huff 10 Yd Pass From Marcus Mariota (Maldonado Kick)

3rd quarter scoring: CAL – Isi Sofele 4 Yd Run (D'Amato Kick); ORE – Josh Huff 35 Yd Pass From Marcus Mariota (Maldonado Kick); ORE – Josh Huff 39 Yd Pass From Marcus Mariota (Maldonado Kick)

4th quarter scoring: ORE – Colt Lyerla 14 Yd Pass From Marcus Mariota (Maldonado Kick); ORE – Will Murphy 7 Yd Pass From Marcus Mariota (Maldonado Kick); ORE – B.J. Kelley 18 Yd Pass From Bryan Bennett (Maldonado Kick)

=== Stanford ===
| Team | 1 | 2 | 3 | 4 | OT | Total |
|---|---|---|---|---|---|---|
| • Stanford | 0 | 7 | 0 | 7 | 3 | 17 |
| Oregon | 0 | 7 | 7 | 0 | 0 | 14 |

- Date: November 17
- Location: Autzen Stadium, Eugene, Oregon

1st quarter scoring:

2nd quarter scoring: STAN – Kevin Hogan 1 Yd Run. (Jordan Williamson Kick); ORE – Keanon Lowe 28 Yd Pass From Marcus Mariota. (Alejandro Maldonado Kick)

3rd quarter scoring: ORE – De'Anthony Thomas 6 Yd Run. (Maldonado Kick);

4th quarter scoring: STAN – Zach Ertz 10 Yd Pass From Kevin Hogan. (Williamson Kick)

Over Time scoring: STAN – Jordan Williamson 37 Yd Field Goal

=== Oregon State ===
| Team | 1 | 2 | 3 | 4 | Total |
|---|---|---|---|---|---|
| • Oregon | 6 | 14 | 14 | 14 | 48 |
| Oregon St | 7 | 3 | 7 | 7 | 24 |

- Date: November 24
- Location: Reser Stadium, Corvallis, Oregon

1st quarter scoring: ORE – Marcus Mariota 42 Yd Run (Two-Point Conversion Failed);ORST – Storm Woods 7 Yd Run (Trevor Romaine Kick)

2nd quarter scoring: ORE – De'Anthony Thomas 2 Yd Run (Maldonado Kick); ORE – Kenjon Barner 1 Yd Run (Maldonado Kick); ORST – Trevor Romaine 36 Yd Field Goal

3rd quarter scoring: ORST – Storm Woods 2 Yd Run (Romaine Kick); ORE – De'Anthony Thomas 5 Yd Run (Maldonado Kick); ORE – De'Anthony Thomas 29 Yd Run (Maldonado Kick)

4th quarter scoring: ORE – Kenjon Barner 1 Yd Run (Maldonado Kick); ORE – B.J. Kelley 2 Yd Pass From Marcus Mariota (Maldonado Kick); ORST – Micah Hatfield 6 Yd Pass From Sean Mannion (Romaine Kick)

=== Fiesta Bowl ===
| Team | 1 | 2 | 3 | 4 | Total |
|---|---|---|---|---|---|
| • Oregon | 15 | 7 | 10 | 3 | 35 |
| Kansas St | 0 | 10 | 0 | 7 | 17 |

- Date: January 3
- Location: University of Phoenix Stadium, Glendale, Arizona

1st quarter scoring: ORE – De'Anthony Thomas 94 Yd Kickoff Return (Dion Jordan Run For Two-Point Conversion); ORE – De'Anthony Thomas 23 Yd Pass From Marcus Mariota (Alejandro Maldonado Kick)

2nd quarter scoring: KSU – Collin Klein 6 Yd Run (Anthony Cantele Kick); KSU – Anthony Cantele 25 Yd Field Goal; ORE – Kenjon Barner 24 Yd Pass From Marcus Mariota (Alejandro Maldonado Kick)

3rd quarter scoring: ORE – Alejandro Maldonado 33 Yd Field Goal; ORE – Marcus Mariota 2 Yd Run (Alejandro Maldonado Kick Blocked, Recovered By Kansas State For 1-Point Safety For Oregon)

4th quarter scoring: KSU – John Hubert 10 Yd Pass From Collin Klein (Anthony Cantele Kick); ORE – Alejandro Maldonado 24 Yd Field Goal

== Roster ==
2012 Oregon Ducks Football
| Quarterback: 2 Bryan Bennett – Sophomore; 8 Marcus Mariota – (redshirt) Freshman; 14 Dustin Haines – Junior; Running back: 6 De'Anthony Thomas – Sophomore; 17 Antwan Baker – (redshirt) Freshman; 24 Kenjon Barner – Senior; 33 Ayele Forde – Sophomore; Offensive lineman: 54 Hamani Stevens – Sophomore; 55 Hroniss Grasu – Sophomore; 57 Trevor Fox – Junior; 58 James Euscher – (redshirt) Freshman; 60 Ryan Clanton – Senior; 61 Nick Cody – Senior; 62 Matt Pierson – (redshirt) Freshman; 63 Mana Greig – Junior; 64 Tyler Johnstone – (redshirt) Freshman; 68 Jamal Prater – (redshirt) Freshman; 69 Brandon Thomas – Sophomore; 71 Everett Benyard – Junior; 72 Andre Yruretagoyena – (redshirt) Freshman; 74 Kyle Long – Senior; 75 Jake Fisher – Sophomore; 77 Carson York – Senior; 78 Karrington Armstrong – Junior; Wide receiver: 1 Josh Huff – Junior; 3. Kevin Jackson – ' (redshirt) Freshman; 7 Keanon Lowe – Sophomore''; 10 Rahsaan Vaughn – Senior; 12 Devon Blackmon – (redshirt) Freshman; 16 Daryle Hawkins – Junior; 19 Eric Dungy – Sophomore; 23 B.J. Kelley – (redshirt) Freshman; 26 Ben Butterfield – Junior; 41 Blake Stanton – Sophomore; 81 Justin Hoffman – Senior; 84 Chad Delaney – Junior; 90 Will Murphy – Senior; 91 Dane Ebanez – Junior; 92 Miles Johnson – (redshirt) Freshman | Tight end: 15 Colt Lyerla – Sophomore; 82 Christian French – (redshirt) Freshman; 83 Curtis White – Sophomore; 85 Pharaoh Brown – Freshman; 86 Brian Teague – Junior; 98 Dallen Voeller – Sophomore; Defensive lineman: 9 Arik Armstead – Freshman; 97 Nick Morrison – Junior; 99 Sam Kamp – (redshirt) Freshman; Defensive tackle: 50 Ryan Hagen – Junior; 65 Isaac Remington – Senior; 66 Taylor Hart – Junior; 90 Ricky Heimuli – Junior; 92 Wade Keliikipi – Junior; 94 Axel McQuaw – Junior; 97 Jared Ebert, Jared – Junior; Defensive end: 57 Ryan McCandless – (redshirt) Freshman; 91 Tony Washington – Sophomore; 95 Koa Ka'ai – (redshirt) Freshman; 96 Dion Jordan – Senior; Linebacker: 22 Derrick Malone – Sophomore; 25 Boseko Lokombo – Junior; 26 Carlyle Garrick – (redshirt) Freshman; 33 Tyson Coleman – (redshirt) Freshman; 34 Rahim Cassell – (redshirt) Freshman; 35 Anthony Wallace – Sophomore; 38 Mike Garrity – Sophomore; 43 Keloni Kamalani – Junior; 46 Michael Clay – Senior; 47 Kiko Alonso – Senior; 48 Rodney Hardrick – Sophomore; 51 Isaac Ava – Sophomore; 36 Jennings Stewart – Senior; 59 Grant Thompson – Sophomore | Defensive back: 2 Troy Hill – Sophomore; 4 Erick Dargan – Sophomore; 5 Issac Dixon – (redshirt) Freshman; 12 Brian Jackson – Junior; 17 James Scales – Sophomore; 27 Terrance Mitchell – Sophomore; 30 Bronson Yim – (redshirt) Freshman; 32 J.R. Maffie – Junior; Cornerback: 3 Dior Mathis – Sophomore; 14 Ifo Ekpre-Olomu – Sophomore; 21 Avery Patterson – Junior; Safety: 20 John Boyett – Senior FS; Long snapper: 39 Drew Howell – Junior; 38 Jeff Palmer – Senior; Punter: 49 Jackson Rice – Senior; Placekicker: 41 Alejandro Maldonado – Junior; 48 Eric Solis – Sophomore; 93 Rob Beard – Senior |
Sources: 2012 Oregon Ducks Football Roster

== Coaching staff ==
- Chip Kelly – Head Coach
- Steve Greatwood – Offensive line
- Nick Aliotti – Defensive coordinator
- Mark Helfrich – Offensive coordinator
- Gary Campbell – Running backs
- Jerry Azzinaro – Defensive line
- John Neal – Secondary
- Tom Osborne – Tight ends & special teams
- Don Pellum – Linebackers & recruiting coordinator
- Scott Frost – Wide receivers & Passing game coordinator
- Jim Radcliffe – Head strength and conditioning coach
- Alex Miller – Graduate assistant coach
- Peter Sirmon – Graduate assistant coach
- Jeff Hawkins – Senior associate athletics director, football operations
- Kyle Wiest – Asst. director of football operations
- Jim Fisher – Asst. director of football operations/recruiting

== Rankings ==
Ranking movements Legend: ██ Increase in ranking ██ Decrease in ranking ( ) = First-place votes
| | Week | | | | | | | | | | | | | | | |
| Poll | Pre | 1 | 2 | 3 | 4 | 5 | 6 | 7 | 8 | 9 | 10 | 11 | 12 | 13 | 14 | Final |
|---|---|---|---|---|---|---|---|---|---|---|---|---|---|---|---|---|
| AP | 5 | 4 | 4 | 3 | 2 | 2 | 2 | 2 | 2 | 2 | 2 | 1 (45) | 5 | 6 | 6 | 2 |
| Coaches | 5 | 4 | 4 (1) | 3 | 2 | 2 | 2 | 2 | 2 | 2 | 2 | 1 (44) | 4 | 4 | 4 | 2 |
| Harris | Not released | | | | | | 2 (5) | 2 (2) | 2 (2) | 2 (2) | 2 (2) | 1 (90) | 4 | 4 | 4 | Not released |
| BCS | Not released | | | | | | | 3 | 4 | 4 | 3 | 2 | 5 | 5 | 5 | Not released |
