= D. J. Harper =

American gridiron football player (born 1989)

D.J. Harper
Profile
- Position: Running back

Personal information
- Born: September 21, 1989 (age 37); Houston, Texas, U.S.
- Listed height: 5 ft 9 in (1.75 m)
- Listed weight: 205 lb (93 kg)

Career information
- High school: Cypress Creek (Houston, Texas)
- College: Boise State
- NFL draft: 2013: undrafted

Career history
- San Francisco 49ers (2013)*; Ottawa Redblacks (2014)*
- * Offseason or practice squad member only

Damon "D. J." Harper (born September 21, 1989) is an American former gridiron football running back. He played college football at Boise State University.

== Early life ==
Harper was a two-sport letterman at Cypress Creek High School, lettering in football three times and track and field twice. He was a three-time unanimous first-team all-district (Cypress-Fairbanks Independent School District) pick, team captain twice and team MVP once. He was named Houston Chronicle Player of the Week, Texas High School Athlete of the Week and finalist for Houston Touchdown Club. As a senior, he rushed for 1,570 yards and 21 touchdowns on 212 carries with 18 receptions for 160 yards. He finished his high school career with 3,900 total yards. After high school, he attended Boise State on a football scholarship.

== College career ==
=== Freshman season ===
During Harper's freshman year on the Boise State team, he had the sixth-best rushing season by a freshman, and the fourth-best by a true freshman, with 376 yards and five touchdowns, despite missing the last two regular season games. He became the first Boise State true freshman since 1988 to rush for more than 100 yards in a game, when he gained 153 yards and a touchdown at Fresno State. He scored a touchdown for the team in their game against East Carolina at the Hawaii Bowl. He finished the year with 6 touchdowns, 376 rushing yards on 87 carries, all career highs. He also had 3 receptions for 13 yards.

=== Sophomore season ===
During Harper's 2nd season at Boise State, he received less carries in a crowded backfield that featured running backs Ian Johnson, Jeremy Avery, and Doug Martin. The highlights for his sophomore campaign include a 2 touchdown performance against Louisiana Tech and 67 rushing yards on just 7 carries. He finished the season with 55 carries for 265 yards and 4 touchdowns.

=== Junior season ===
Prior to the season, Harper was labeled as the fastest player on the Boise State Broncos football team with an astounding 4.34 40 yard dash time. During Harper's junior season at Boise State in 2009, he received many more carries than in previous years, mainly due to the departure of Ian Johnson for the NFL, and Doug Martin moving to defense. In week 1 against the Oregon Ducks, he had 19 carries for 88 yards and a touchdown, in addition to a 33-yard rush. In week 2 against the Miami (OH) RedHawks, Harper rushed 13 times for 89 yards and a touchdown, with a rushing long of 32 yards. In week 3 at the Fresno State Bulldogs, Harper rushed 12 times for 107 yards and a touchdown through most of the game. However, during the game he suffered a season ending ACL injury, derailing the leading rusher for Boise State's season. He finished the year with a career-high 6.5 yards per rush. He was later granted a medical redshirt, leaving him with 2 years of eligibility remaining in his career.

=== Redshirt junior season ===
Harper came into his second junior season low on the depth chart, despite his surge in the off-season to rehab a knee injury sustained in a game in the previous season. In week 1 against the Virginia Tech Hokies, Harper rushed 4 times for 80 yards and a career-high 71 yard rush for a touchdown. In week 2 against the Wyoming Cowboys, Harper rushed 11 times for 59 yards and a touchdown. Through 2 games, he averaged 9.3 yards per rush, with 15 rushes for 139 yards and 2 touchdowns. During the 3rd game of the season, against visiting Oregon State, Harper again suffered a season ending ACL injury.

== Professional career ==
=== 2013 NFL Combine ===
Pre-draft measurables
Height	Weight	40-yard dash	10-yard split	20-yard split	20-yard shuttle	Three-cone drill	Vertical jump	Broad jump	Bench press
5 ft 9 in (1.75 m)	211 lb (96 kg)	4.46 s	1.56 s	2.55 s	4.13 s	6.80 s	33.5 in (0.85 m)	10 ft 0 in (3.05 m)	23 reps
All values from NFL Combine

=== San Francisco 49ers ===
On May 7, 2013, Harper was signed by the San Francisco 49ers as an undrafted free agent. On August 26, 2013, he was waived by the 49ers.

=== Ottawa Redblacks ===
Harper signed with the Ottawa Redblacks on June 5, 2014. He was released by the Redblacks on January 8, 2015.
