= Khalid Wooten =

American gridiron football player (born 1990)

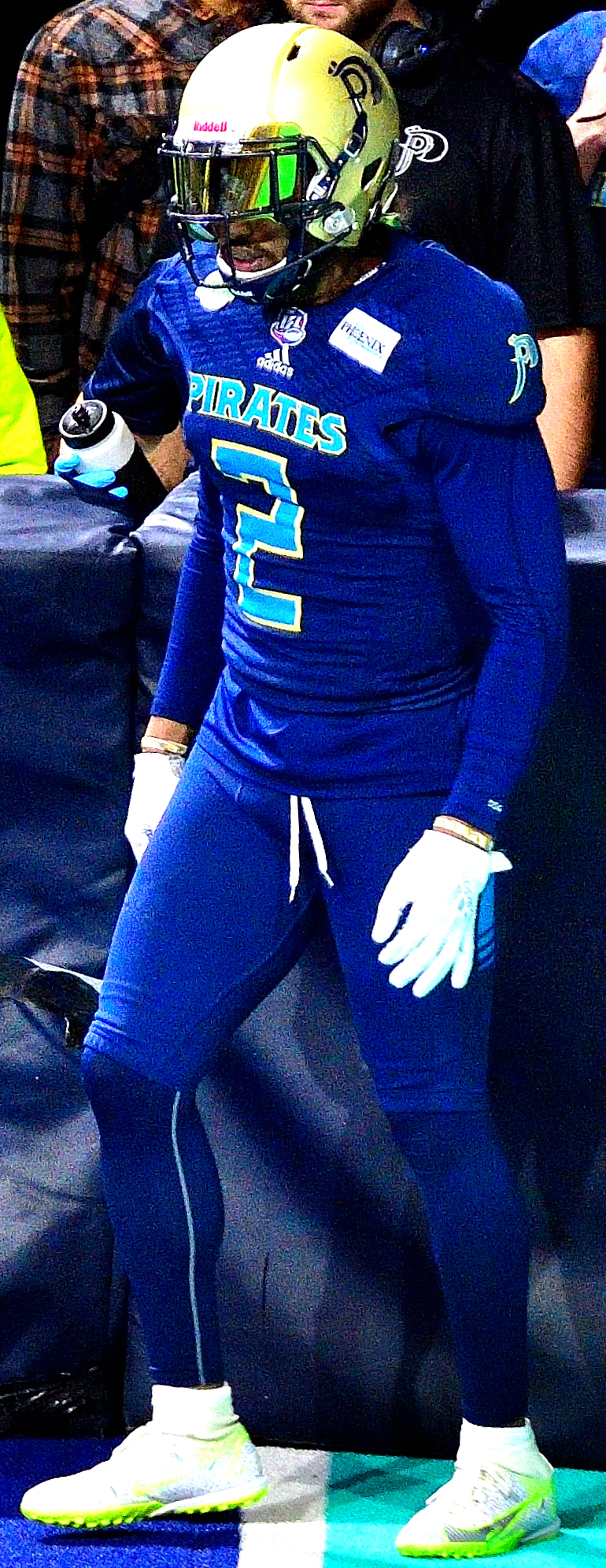
- Wooten with the Massachusetts Pirates in 2020

No. 36, 9, 2
- Position: Cornerback

Personal information
- Born: February 19, 1990 (age 36); San Bernardino, California, U.S.
- Listed height: 5 ft 11 in (1.80 m)
- Listed weight: 200 lb (91 kg)

Career information
- High school: Rialto (CA) Carter
- College: Nevada
- NFL draft: 2013: 6th round, 202nd overall pick

Career history
- Tennessee Titans (2013–2014); Montreal Alouettes (2016); Hamilton Tiger-Cats (2017); Toronto Argonauts (2017); Massachusetts Pirates (2018); Atlantic City Blackjacks (2019)*; Massachusetts Pirates (2019–2022)
- * Offseason or practice squad member only

Awards and highlights
- United Bowl champion (2021)
- Stats at Pro Football Reference
- Stats at CFL.ca

Khalid Bilal Wooten (born February 19, 1990) is an American former professional football cornerback. He played college football at Nevada and was selected by the Tennessee Titans in the sixth round of the 2013 NFL draft.

== Early life ==
He attended Carter High School in Rialto, California. He was a four-year letterman in high school. He selected as the Citrus Belt League MVP in 2007 and also was selected two-time first-team All-League team for the 2006 and 2007 seasons.

== College career ==
He played college football at Nevada. He was selected to Preseason All-MW Second-team by the Phil Steele in his senior season. In, 2012, He also was selected to the Preseason All-MW Third-team by College Football Madness.

== Professional career ==
=== Tennessee Titans ===
On April 27, 2013, he was selected in the sixth round (202 overall) by the Tennessee Titans in the 2013 NFL draft. The Titans released Wooten on August 31, 2013. He was signed to the practice squad for the Titans the following day. Tennessee waived him again on August 31, 2014.

=== Montreal Alouettes ===
Wooten played in two games, starting in both instances, for the Montreal Alouettes (CFL) in 2016.

=== Hamilton Tiger-Cats ===
On May 1, 2017, Wooten was traded to the Hamilton Tiger-Cats in exchange for running back Cierre Wood, defensive end Denzell Perine.

=== Toronto Argonauts ===
Wooten was signed to the practice roster of the Toronto Argonauts on August 22, 2017.

=== Atlantic City Blackjacks ===
On April 3, 2019, Wooten was assigned to the Atlantic City Blackjacks.

=== Massachusetts Pirates ===
Later in 2019, Wooten signed to the Massachusetts Pirates, where he played for three seasons including on the 2021 United Bowl championship team. On June 13, 2022, Wooten was released by the Pirates.
