= Zach Sudfeld =

American football player (born 1989)

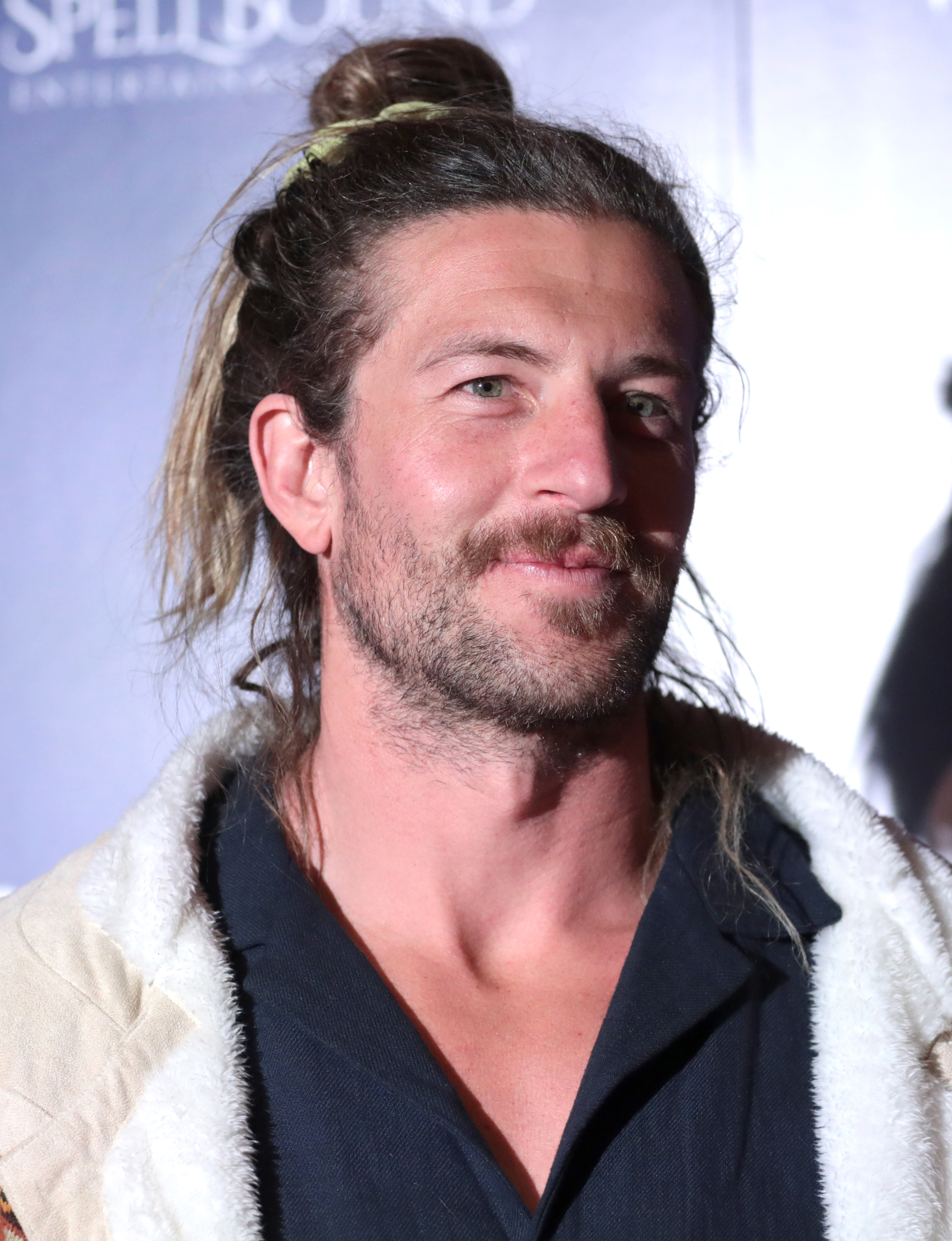
- Sudfeld in 2023

No. 44, 82
- Position: Tight end

Personal information
- Born: April 17, 1989 (age 37); Santa Cruz, California, U.S.
- Listed height: 6 ft 7 in (2.01 m)
- Listed weight: 260 lb (118 kg)

Career information
- High school: Modesto Christian (Salida, California)
- College: Nevada (2007–2012)
- NFL draft: 2013: undrafted

Career history
- New England Patriots (2013); New York Jets (2013–2015)

Career NFL statistics
- Receptions: 10
- Receiving yards: 148
- Stats at Pro Football Reference

Zachary Jonathan Pagett Sudfeld (born April 17, 1989) is an American former professional football player who was a tight end in the National Football League (NFL). He played college football for the Nevada Wolf Pack and was signed by the New England Patriots of the National Football League (NFL) as an undrafted free agent in 2013.

== Early life ==
Sudfeld attended Modesto Christian High School in Modesto, California. Sudfeld was named to the first-team all-state as a tight end. He also earned the first-team all-district and all-league honors in high school.

== Professional career ==
Pre-draft measurables
Height	Weight	Arm length	Hand span	40-yard dash	10-yard split	20-yard split	20-yard shuttle	Three-cone drill	Vertical jump	Broad jump	Bench press
6 ft 6 3/4 in (2.00 m)	253 lb (115 kg)	33 1/2 in (0.85 m)	9 3/4 in (0.25 m)	4.78 s	1.65 s	2.80 s	4.41 s	7.08 s	37.0 in (0.94 m)	9 ft 5 in (2.87 m)	11 reps
All values from Pro Day

=== New England Patriots ===
On May 3, 2013, Sudfeld signed with the New England Patriots. Sudfeld's size and catching ability led at least one Patriots reporter to call Sudfeld a "baby Gronk," referring to New England Patriots tight end Rob Gronkowski. During the Patriots' second preseason game, against the Tampa Bay Buccaneers, Sudfeld scored on a two-point conversion from Tom Brady and on a 22-yard touchdown from Ryan Mallett. On October 3, 2013, Sudfeld was released from the Patriots, after lackluster performances, where Sudfeld made no receptions.

=== New York Jets ===
Sudfeld was claimed off waivers by the New York Jets on October 4, 2013. He caught 5 passes for 63 yards on the season. Sudfeld suffered an anterior cruciate ligament injury in minicamp and was waived on June 15, 2015. He cleared waivers a day later and was placed on the injured reserve list. On September 3, 2016, Sudfeld was released by the Jets as part of final roster cuts.

== Personal life ==
Sudfeld is married with two kids.

Sudfeld has a twin brother named Matt, who is director of strategic development of a humanitarian organization that was started by his grandparents. He also has two sisters: Juliana, who played volleyball for Wheaton College in Illinois, and Sarah, who played basketball for The King's College in New York City. His younger brother, Nate, was a quarterback in the NFL.
