= Tyler Slavin =

American football player (born 1992)

No. 8, 13
- Position: Wide receiver

Personal information
- Born: January 29, 1992 (age 34); Corona, California, U.S.
- Listed height: 6 ft 1 in (1.85 m)
- Listed weight: 210 lb (95 kg)

Career information
- High school: Eleanor Roosevelt (Eastvale, California)
- College: New Mexico Highlands; Arizona
- NFL draft: 2015: undrafted

Career history
- St. Louis Rams (2015)*; Seattle Seahawks (2015)*; Seattle Seahawks (2016)
- * Offseason or practice squad member only
- Stats at Pro Football Reference

Tyler Slavin (born January 29, 1992) is an American former football wide receiver. He played college football at Arizona and New Mexico Highlands.

== Early life ==
Slavin attended Eleanor Roosevelt High School in Eastvale, California, where he graduated in 2010.

== College career ==
=== Arizona Wildcats ===
Slavin committed to play for Arizona on December 7, 2009, and enrolled on June 30, 2010. Slavin redshirted for his freshman season with the Wildcats. Over the next two seasons Slavin appeared in 18 games as a reserve receiver for the Wildcats making 22 receptions for 224 yards and a touchdown. In late June 2013 Slavin left the Arizona Wildcats' football program and transferred to New Mexico Highlands, a Division II football program.

=== New Mexico Highlands Cowboys ===
Slavin sat out his first season at New Mexico Highlands. In the second season with Cowboys, Slavin had games with 17 receipts for 225 yards and four touchdowns as well as an outing with 14 receipts for 278 yards and two touchdowns. At the end of the season Slavin was honored with the RMAC Offensive Player of the Year award and was named first-team all-conference after making 119 receptions for 1,418 yards and 17 touchdowns.

== Professional career ==
=== St. Louis Rams ===
On May 2, 2015, after going undrafted, the St. Louis Rams signed Slavin as an undrafted free agent. On August 31, 2015, Slavin was released as part of the team's roster cuts down to 75 players.

=== Seattle Seahawks ===
On November 24, 2015, the Seattle Seahawks signed Slavin to their practice squad. On December 1, 2015, the Seahawks released Slavin from their practice squad. On February 4, 2016, Slavin signed a futures contract with the Seahawks. On May 4, 2016, the Seahawks waived Slavin. He resigned with the Seahawks on May 9, 2016, after participating in the Seahawks' Mini Camp. On July 31, 2016, the Seahawks placed Slavin on the injured reserve list.
