= Stefphon Jefferson =

American gridiron football player (born 1991)

No. 25
- Position: Running back

Personal information
- Born: August 14, 1991 (age 35); Hanford, California, U.S.
- Listed height: 5 ft 10 in (1.78 m)
- Listed weight: 213 lb (97 kg)

Career information
- High school: Visalia (CA) El Diamante
- College: Nevada
- NFL draft: 2013: undrafted

Career history
- Tennessee Titans (2013)*; Calgary Stampeders (2013)*
- * Offseason or practice squad member only

Awards and highlights
- Second-team All-American (2012); First Team All-MWC (2012)

Stefphon Alexander Jefferson (born August 14, 1991) is an American former football running back. He played college football for the Nevada Wolf Pack.

== High school ==
Jefferson attended El Diamante High School in Visalia, California, where he was a four-year letterman in football. He helped lead team to CIF Section Championship game three years in a row, with a victory in 2007. As a senior in 2008, he ran for 2,862 yards and 34 touchdowns, and was the West Yosemite League Player of the Year and the Tulare County Player of the Year while also earning first-team all-league honors. Was also named to the Fresno Bee's first-team all-area team, and was a second-team all-league selection as a junior.

== College career ==
Jefferson attended University of Nevada between 2009 and 2012. As a freshman and sophomore, Jefferson rushed for a combined 455 yards on 73 carries with six touchdowns. As a junior in 2012, he rushed for 1,883 yards on 375 carries with 24 touchdowns. The rushing yards were the second most in the country behind Ka'Deem Carey.

== Professional career ==
=== NFL draft ===
On January 1, 2013, Jefferson announced his decision to forgo his remaining two seasons of eligibility and enter the 2013 NFL draft. Jefferson was signed by the Tennessee Titans as an undrafted free agent on April 28, 2013. He was released by the Titans on May 15, 2013. The first El Diamante Miner to ever play in the NFL. He also spent time on the practice roster of the Calgary Stampeders.
