= 2012 Pac-12 Conference football season =

American college football season

- League: NCAA Division I FBS (Football Bowl Subdivision)
- Sport: American football
- Duration: August 30, 2012 through January 2013
- Teams: 12
- TV partner(s): ABC, FX, ESPN, ESPN2, ESPNU, FOX, and Pac-12 Networks

2013 NFL Draft
- Top draft pick: DE Dion Jordan, Oregon
- Picked by: Miami Dolphins, 3rd overall

Regular season
- North champions: Stanford Cardinal; Oregon Ducks
- North runners-up: Oregon State Beavers
- South champions: UCLA Bruins
- South runners-up: Arizona State Sun Devils; USC Trojans

Pac-12 Championship
- Champions: Stanford Cardinal
- Runners-up: UCLA Bruins
- Finals MVP: Kevin Hogan (QB)

Football seasons
- 2011 2013

2012 Pac-12 Conference football standings
	Conf.			Overall
Team	W		L	W		L
North Division
No. 7 Stanford xy$	8	–	1	12	–	2
No. 2 Oregon x%	8	–	1	12	–	1
No. 20 Oregon State	6	–	3	9	–	4
Washington	5	–	4	7	–	6
California	2	–	7	3	–	9
Washington State	1	–	8	3	–	9
South Division
UCLA xy	6	–	3	9	–	5
Arizona State	5	–	4	8	–	5
USC	5	–	4	7	–	6
Arizona	4	–	5	8	–	5
Utah	3	–	6	5	–	7
Colorado	1	–	8	1	–	11
Championship: Stanford 27, UCLA 24
$ – BCS representative as conference champion; % – BCS at-large representative; x – Division champion/co-champions; y – Championship game participant; Rankings from AP Poll

The 2012 Pac-12 Conference football season began on August 30, 2012, with Northern Colorado at Utah. The conference's first game was played on September 15 with #2 USC at #21 Stanford, and the final game played was the Pac-12 Championship Game on November 30, 2012. This is the second season for the conference as a 12-team league. Pac-12 champion Stanford was featured in the Rose Bowl, a BCS bowl, when they prevailed 20–14 against Big Ten Champion Wisconsin on January 1, 2013.

== Preseason ==
2012 Pac-12 Spring Football:

North Division

- California - Thu., March 15 to Sat., April 21
- Oregon - Tue., April 3 to Sat., April 28
- Oregon State - Mon., March 12 to Sat., April 28
- Stanford - Mon., Feb. 27 to Sat., April 14
- Washington - Mon., April 2 to Sat., April 28
- Washington State - Thu., March 22 to Sat., April 21

South Division

- Arizona - Mon., March 5 to Sat., April 14
- Arizona State - Tue., March 13 to Sat., April 21
- Colorado - Sat., March 10 to Sat., April 14
- UCLA - Tue., April 3 to Sat., May 5
- USC - Tue., March 6 to Sat., April 14
- Utah - Wed., March 21 to Sat., April 21

== Head coaches ==
- Rich Rodriguez, Arizona – 1st year
- Todd Graham, Arizona State – 1st year
- Jeff Tedford, California – 6th year
- Jon Embree, Colorado – 2nd year
- Chip Kelly, Oregon – 4th year
- Mike Riley, Oregon State – 11th year
- David Shaw, Stanford – 2nd year
- Jim L. Mora, UCLA – 1st year
- Lane Kiffin, USC – 3rd year
- Kyle Whittingham, Utah – 8th year
- Steve Sarkisian, Washington – 4th year
- Mike Leach, Washington State – 1st year

== Rankings ==
Legend
	Increase in ranking
	Decrease in ranking
	Not ranked previous week
RV	Received votes but were not ranked in Top 25 of poll

		Pre	Wk 1	Wk 2	Wk 3	Wk 4	Wk 5	Wk 6	Wk 7	Wk 8	Wk 9	Wk 10	Wk 11	Wk 12	Wk 13	Wk 14	Final
Arizona	AP		24	24	22	RV	RV	RV	RV	RV	24	RV	RV	RV			
Arizona	C		25	25	21	RV					RV			RV	RV		
Arizona	Harris	Not released						RV			RV	RV	RV	RV	RV	RV	
Arizona	BCS	Not released									22			24			
Arizona State	AP		RV	RV	RV	RV	RV	RV	RV	RV							
Arizona State	C		RV	RV	RV	RV	RV	RV	24	RV	RV	RV			RV	RV	
Arizona State	Harris	Not released						RV	24	RV	RV				RV		
Arizona State	BCS	Not released															
California	AP																
California	C																
California	Harris	Not released						RV									
California	BCS	Not released															
Colorado	AP																
Colorado	C																
Colorado	Harris	Not released															
Colorado	BCS	Not released															
Oregon	AP	5	4	4	3	2	2	2	2	2	2	2	1	5	6	5	
Oregon	C	5	4	4	3	2	2	2	2	2	2	2	1	4	4	3	
Oregon	Harris	Not released						2	2	2	2	2	1	4	4	3	
Oregon	BCS	Not released							3	4	4	3	2	5	5	4	
Oregon State	AP		RV	RV	RV	18	14	10	8	7	13	13	15	16	16	15	
Oregon State	C		RV	RV	RV	21	17	14	11	9	13	12	17	17	17	14	
Oregon State	Harris	Not released						12	10	8	13	12	16	15	15	14	
Oregon State	BCS	Not released							8	7	11	11	16	15	15	13	
Stanford	AP	21	25	21	9	8	18	17	22	19	15	16	14	11	8	8	
Stanford	C	18	21	16	11	9	18	17	23	19	15	15	13	11	9	8	
Stanford	Harris	Not released						16	20	18	14	14	13	11	8	7	
Stanford	BCS	Not released							20	17	14	14	13	8	8	6	
UCLA	AP		22	22	19	RV	25			RV	25	17	17	15	17	17	
UCLA	C		23	23	19	RV	RV		RV	RV	RV	19	16	16	16	19	
UCLA	Harris	Not released						RV	RV	RV	RV	21	19	16	16	17	
UCLA	BCS	Not released										18	17	17	16	17	
USC	AP	1	2	2	13	13	13	11	11	10	18	21	21	RV	RV	RV	
USC	C	3	2	3	12	13	12	9	9	8	17	22	21	RV	RV	RV	
USC	Harris	Not released						10	11	9	16	18	18	RV	RV	RV	
USC	BCS	Not released							10	9	17	19	18				
Utah	AP	RV	RV		RV												
Utah	C	RV	RV		RV												
Utah	Harris	Not released															
Utah	BCS	Not released															
Washington	AP	RV	RV				23	RV	RV		RV	RV	RV	RV			
Washington	C	RV	RV	RV	RV	RV	RV					RV	RV	RV			
Washington	Harris	Not released						RV	RV		RV		RV	RV	RV		
Washington	BCS	Not released											25	25			
Washington State	AP																
Washington State	C																
Washington State	Harris	Not released															
Washington State	BCS	Not released															

== Schedule ==
Index to colors and formatting
Pac-12 member won
Pac-12 member lost
Pac-12 teams in **bold**

=== Week 1 ===
Date	Time	Visiting team	Home team	Site	TV	Result	Attendance	Ref.
August 30	4:15 p.m.	Northern Colorado	**Utah**	Rice-Eccles Stadium • Salt Lake City, Utah	Pac-12 Networks	**W** 41–0	45,273	
August 30	4:30 p.m.	**UCLA**	Rice	Rice Stadium • Houston, TX	CBS Sports Network	**W** 49–24	23,107	
August 30	7:15 p.m.	**Washington State**	BYU	LaVell Edwards Stadium • Provo, Utah	ESPN	**L** 6–30	57,045	
August 30	7:30 p.m.	Northern Arizona	**Arizona State**	Sun Devil Stadium • Tempe, AZ	Pac-12 Networks	**W** 63–6	48,658	
August 31	7:00 p.m.	San Jose State	No. 21 **Stanford**	Stanford Stadium • Stanford, CA	Pac-12 Networks	**W** 20–17	40,577	
September 1†	12:00 p.m.	Nicholls State	**Oregon State**	Reser Stadium • Corvallis, OR	Pac-12 Networks			
September 1	12:00 p.m.	Nevada	**California**	California Memorial Stadium • Berkeley, CA	Pac-12 Networks	**L** 31–24	63,186	
September 1	1:00 p.m.	**Colorado**	Colorado State	Sports Authority Field at Mile High • Denver, CO (Rocky Mountain Showdown)	FX	**L** 17–22	58,607	
September 1	4:30 p.m.	Hawaii	No. 1 **USC**	Los Angeles Memorial Coliseum • Los Angeles, CA	FOX	**W** 49–10	93,607	
September 1	7:30 p.m.	Toledo	**Arizona**	Arizona Stadium • Tucson, AZ	ESPNU	**W** 24–17	48,670	
September 1	7:30 p.m.	Arkansas State	No. 5 **Oregon**	Autzen Stadium • Eugene, OR	ESPN	**W** 57–34	56,144	
September 1	7:30 p.m.	San Diego State	**Washington**	CenturyLink Field • Seattle, WA	Pac-12 Networks	**W** 21–12	53,742	
^{#}Rankings from AP Poll released prior to game. All times are in Pacific Time. †Oregon State–Nicholls State game postponed indefinitely due to Hurricane Isaac preventing Nicholls State from traveling.

=== Week 2 ===
Date	Time	Visiting team	Home team	Site	TV	Result	Attendance	Ref.
September 7	5:00 p.m.	**Utah**	Utah State	Romney Stadium • Logan, UT (Battle of the Brothers)	ESPN2	**L** 20–27	25,513	
September 8	12:00 p.m.	Southern Utah	**California**	California Memorial Stadium • Berkeley, CA	Pac-12 Network	**W** 50–31	57,745	
September 8	12:00 p.m.	Sacramento State	**Colorado**	Folsom Field • Boulder, CO	Pac-12 Network	**L** 28–30	46,843	
September 8	12:00 p.m.	Eastern Washington	**Washington State**	Martin Stadium • Pullman, WA	Pac-12 Network	**W** 24–20	33,598	
September 8	12:30 p.m.	No. 2 **USC**	Syracuse	MetLife Stadium • East Rutherford, NJ	ABC	**W** 42–28	39,507	
September 8	1:00 p.m.	No. 13 Wisconsin	**Oregon State**	Reser Stadium • Corvallis, OR	FX	**W** 10–7	42,189	
September 8	3:30 p.m.	Fresno State	No. 4 **Oregon**	Autzen Stadium • Eugene, OR	Pac-12 Network	**W** 42–25	55,755	
September 8	4:00 p.m.	**Washington**	No. 3 LSU	Tiger Stadium • Baton Rouge, LA	ESPN	**L** 3–41	92,804	
September 8	4:30 p.m.	No. 16 Nebraska	**UCLA**	Rose Bowl • Pasadena, California	FOX	**W** 36–30	71,530	
September 8	7:30 p.m.	Illinois	**Arizona State**	Sun Devil Stadium • Tempe, AZ	ESPN	**W** 45–14	54,128	
September 8	7:30 p.m.	Duke	No. 25 **Stanford**	Stanford Stadium • Stanford, CA	Pac-12 Network	**W** 50–13	44,016	
September 8	7:30 p.m.	No. 18 Oklahoma State	**Arizona**	Arizona Stadium • Tucson, AZ	Pac-12 Network	**W** 59–38	45,602	
^{#}Rankings from AP Poll released prior to game. All times are in Pacific Time.

=== Week 3 ===
Date	Time	Visiting team	Home team	Site	TV	Result	Attendance	Ref.
September 14	6:00 p.m.	**Washington State**	UNLV	Sam Boyd Stadium • Paradise, NV	ESPN	**W** 35–27	17,015	
September 15	9:00 a.m.	**California**	Ohio State	Ohio Stadium • Columbus, OH	ABC	**L** 35–28	105,232	
September 15	12:00 p.m.	Tennessee Tech	No. 4 **Oregon**	Autzen Stadium • Eugene, OR	Pac-12 Network	**W** 63–14	57,091	
September 15	1:00 p.m.	Portland State	**Washington**	CenturyLink Field • Seattle, WA	FX	**W** 52–13	54,922	
September 15	4:00 p.m.	**Arizona State**	Missouri	Faurot Field • Columbia, MO	ESPN2	**L** 20–24	71,004	
September 15	4:30 p.m.	No. 2 **USC**	No. 21 **Stanford**	Stanford Stadium • Stanford, CA	FOX	**STAN** 21–14	50,360	
September 15	5:00 p.m.	**Colorado**	Fresno State	Bulldog Stadium • Fresno, CA	CBSSN	**L** 14–69	27,513	
September 15	7:00 p.m.	BYU	**Utah**	Rice-Eccles Stadium • Salt Lake City, UT (Holy War)	ESPN2	**W** 24–21	45,653	
September 15	7:30 p.m.	Houston	No. 22 **UCLA**	Rose Bowl • Pasadena, CA	Pac-12 Network	**W** 37–6	53,723	
September 15	7:30 p.m.	South Carolina State	No. 24 **Arizona**	Arizona Stadium • Tucson, AZ	Pac-12 Network	**W** 56–0	43,919	
^{#}Rankings from AP Poll released prior to game. All times are in Pacific Time.

=== Week 4 ===
Date	Time	Visiting team	Home team	Site	TV	Result	Attendance	Ref.
September 22	12:30 p.m.	**Oregon State**	No. 19 **UCLA**	Rose Bowl • Pasadena, CA	ABC/ESPN2	**ORST** 27–20	54,636	
September 22	1:00 p.m.	**Colorado**	**Washington State**	Martin Stadium • Pullman, WA	FX	**COL** 35–34	31,668	
September 22	3:00 p.m.	**California**	No. 13 **USC**	Los Angeles Memorial Coliseum • Los Angeles, CA	Pac-12 Network	**USC** 27–9	83,421	
September 22	7:00 p.m.	**Utah**	**Arizona State**	Sun Devil Stadium • Tempe, AZ	Pac-12 Network	**ASU** 37–7	58,107	
September 22	7:30 p.m.	No. 22 **Arizona**	No. 3 **Oregon**	Autzen Stadium • Eugene, OR	ESPN	**ORE** 49–0	58,334	
^{#}Rankings from AP Poll released prior to game. All times are in Pacific Time.

=== Week 5 ===
Date	Time	Visiting team	Home team	Site	TV	Result	Attendance	Ref.
September 27	6:00 p.m.	No. 8 **Stanford**	**Washington**	CenturyLink Field • Seattle, WA	ESPN	**WASH** 17–13	55,941	
September 29	1:00 p.m.	**Arizona State**	**California**	California Memorial Stadium • Berkeley, CA	FX	**ASU** 27–17	51,634	
September 29	3:00 p.m.	**UCLA**	**Colorado**	Folsom Field • Boulder, CO	Pac-12 Network	**UCLA** 42–14	46,893	
September 29	7:00 p.m.	No. 18 **Oregon State**	**Arizona**	Arizona Stadium • Tucson, AZ	Pac-12 Network	**ORST** 38–35	44,153	
September 29	7:30 p.m.	No. 2 **Oregon**	**Washington State**	CenturyLink Field • Seattle, WA	ESPN2	**ORE** 51–26	60,929	
^{#}Rankings from AP Poll released prior to game. All times are in Pacific Time.

=== Week 6 ===
Date	Time	Visiting team	Home team	Site	TV	Result	Attendance	Ref.
October 4	6:00 pm	No. 13 **USC**	**Utah**	Rice-Eccles Stadium • Salt Lake City, UT	ESPN	**USC** 38–28	46,037	
October 6	12:00 pm	**Arizona**	No. 18 **Stanford**	Stanford Stadium • Stanford, CA	FOX	**STAN** 54–48 ^{OT}	48,204	
October 6	3:00 pm	**Washington State**	No. 14 **Oregon State**	Reser Stadium • Corvallis, OR	Pac-12 Network	**ORST** 19–6	46,579	
October 6	7:00 p.m.	No. 25 **UCLA**	**California**	California Memorial Stadium • Berkeley, CA	Pac-12 Network	**CAL** 43–17	57,643	
October 6	7:30 pm	No. 23 **Washington**	No. 2 **Oregon**	Autzen Stadium • Eugene, OR (Oregon–Washington football rivalry)	ESPN	**ORE** 52–21	58,792	
^{#}Rankings from AP Poll released prior to game. All times are in Pacific Time.

=== Week 7 ===
Date	Time	Visiting team	Home team	Site	TV	Result	Attendance	Ref.
October 11	6:00 pm	**Arizona State**	**Colorado**	Folsom Field • Boulder, CO	ESPN	**ASU** 51–17	45,161	
October 13	12:00 pm	**Utah**	**UCLA**	Rose Bowl • Pasadena, CA	FOX	**UCLA** 21–14	66,303	
October 13	12:30 pm	No. 10 **Oregon State**	BYU	LaVell Edwards Stadium • Provo, UT	ABC	**W** 42–24	63,489	
October 13	12:30 pm	No. 17 **Stanford**	No. 7 Notre Dame	Notre Dame Stadium • Notre Dame, IN (Legends Trophy)	NBC	**L** 13–20	80,975	
October 13	4:00 pm	No. 11 **USC**	**Washington**	CenturyLink Field • Seattle, WA	FOX	**USC** 24–14	66,202	
October 13	7:30 pm	**California**	**Washington State**	Martin Stadium • Pullman, WA	Pac-12 Network	**CAL** 31–17	27,339	
^{#}Rankings from AP Poll released prior to game. All times are in Pacific Time.

=== Week 8 ===
Date	Time	Visiting team	Home team	Site	TV	Result	Attendance	Ref.
October 18	6:00 pm	No. 2 **Oregon**	**Arizona State**	Sun Devil Stadium • Tempe, AZ	ESPN	**ORE** 43–21	71,004	
October 20	12:00 pm	No. 22 **Stanford**	**California**	California Memorial Stadium • Berkeley, CA (Big Game)	FOX	**STAN** 21–3	61,024	
October 20	3:00 pm	**Colorado**	No. 11 **USC**	Los Angeles Memorial Coliseum • Los Angeles, CA	Pac-12 Networks	**USC** 50–6	83,274	
October 20	7:00 pm	**Washington**	**Arizona**	Arizona Stadium • Tucson, AZ	Pac-12 Networks	**ARIZ** 52–17	50,148	
October 20	7:30 pm	**Utah**	No. 8 **Oregon State**	Reser Stadium • Corvallis, OR	ESPN or ESPN2	**OSU** 21–7	45,769	
^{#}Rankings from AP Poll released prior to game. All times are in Pacific Time.

=== Week 9 ===
Date	Time	Visiting team	Home team	Site	TV	Result	Attendance	Ref.
October 27	12:00 pm	**UCLA**	**Arizona State**	Sun Devil Stadium • Tempe, AZ	FX	**UCLA** 45–43	55,672	
October 27	12:00 pm	**Colorado**	No. 2 **Oregon**	Autzen Stadium • Eugene, OR	Pac-12 Networks	**ORE** 70–14	57,521	
October 27	12:30 pm	No. 10 **USC**	**Arizona**	Arizona Stadium • Tucson, AZ	ABC/ESPN2	**ARIZ** 39–36	47,822	
October 27	3:15 pm	**Washington State**	No. 19 **Stanford**	Stanford Stadium • Stanford, CA	Pac-12 Networks	**STAN** 24–17	41,496	
October 27	6:45 pm	**California**	**Utah**	Rice-Eccles Stadium • Salt Lake City, UT	Pac-12 Networks	**UTAH** 49–27	45,017	
October 27	7:15 pm	No. 7 **Oregon State**	**Washington**	CenturyLink Field • Seattle, WA	Pac-12 Networks	**WASH** 20–17	60,842	
^{#}Rankings from AP Poll released prior to game. All times are in Pacific Time.

=== Week 10 ===
Date	Time	Visiting team	Home team	Site	TV	Result	Attendance	Ref.
November 2	6:00 pm	**Washington**	**California**	California Memorial Stadium • Berkeley, CA	ESPN2	**WASH** 21–13	42,226	
November 3	11:00 am	**Stanford**	**Colorado**	Folsom Field • Boulder, CO	FX	**STAN** 48–0	44,138	
November 3	12:00 pm	**Washington State**	**Utah**	Rice-Eccles Stadium • Salt Lake City, UT	Pac-12 Networks	**UTAH** 48–6	45,069	
November 3	4:00 pm	**Oregon**	**USC**	Los Angeles Memorial Coliseum • Los Angeles, CA	FOX	**ORE** 62–51	93,607	
November 3	7:30 pm	**Arizona State**	No. 11 **Oregon State**	Reser Stadium • Corvallis, OR	ESPN or ESPN2	**OSU** 36–26	45,979	
November 3†	7:30 pm	No. 24 **Arizona**	No. 25 **UCLA**	Rose Bowl • Pasadena, CA	Pac-12 Networks	**UCLA** 66–10	81,673	
^{#}Rankings from AP Poll released prior to game. All times are in Pacific Time.

=== Week 11 ===
Date	Time	Visiting team	Home team	Site	TV	Result	Attendance	Ref.
November 10	10:30 am	**Colorado**	**Arizona**	Arizona Stadium • Tucson, AZ	FX	**ARIZ** 56–31	51,236	
November 12	12:00 p.m.	No. 11 **Oregon State**	No. 14 **Stanford**	Stanford Stadium • Stanford, CA	FOX	**STAN** 27–23	47,127	
November 10	12:00 p.m.	**Arizona State**	No. 19 **USC**	Los Angeles Memorial Coliseum • Los Angeles, CA	Pac-12 Networks	**USC** 38–17	80,154	
November 10	7:30 p.m.	No. 3 **Oregon**	**California**	California Memorial Stadium • Berkeley, CA	ESPN	**ORE** 59–17	57,672	
November 10	7:30 p.m.	#17 **UCLA**	**Washington State**	Martin Stadium • Pullman, WA	ESPN2	**UCLA** 44–36	28,110	
November 10	7:30 p.m.	**Utah**	**Washington**	CenturyLink Field • Seattle, WA	Pac-12 Networks	**WASH** 34–15	60,050	
^{#}Rankings from AP Poll released prior to game. All times are in Pacific Time.

=== Week 12 ===
Date	Time	Visiting team	Home team	Site	TV	Result	Attendance	Ref.
November 17	10:30 a.m.	No. 25 **Washington**	**Colorado**	Folson Field • Boulder, CO	FX	**WASH** 38–3	43,148	
November 17	12:00 p.m.	**Washington State**	**Arizona State**	Sun Devil Stadium • Tempe, AZ	Pac-12 Network	**ASU** 46–7	53,438	
November 17	12:05 pm	No. 21 **USC**	No. 17 **UCLA**	Rose Bowl • Pasadena, CA (Victory Bell)	FOX	**UCLA** 38–28	83,277	
November 17	5:00 p.m.	No. 14 **Stanford**	No. 1 **Oregon**	Autzen Stadium • Eugene, OR	ABC	**STAN** 17–14	58,792	
November 17	7:00 p.m.	**Arizona**	**Utah**	Rice-Eccles Stadium • Salt Lake City, UT	ESPNU	**ARIZ** 34–24	45,031	
November 17	7:30 p.m.	**California**	No. 15 **Oregon State**	Reser Stadium • Corvallis, OR	Pac-12 Networks	**OSU** 62–14	43,779	
^{#}Rankings from AP Poll released prior to game. All times are in Pacific Time.

=== Week 13 ===
Date	Time	Visiting team	Home team	Site	TV	Result	Attendance	Ref.
November 23	12:00 pm	**Utah**	**Colorado**	Folson Field • Boulder, CO (Rumble in the Rockies)	FX	**UTAH** 42–35		
November 23	12:30 pm	**Washington**	**Washington State**	Martin Stadium • Pullman, WA (Apple Cup)	FOX	**WSU** 31–28		
November 23	7:00 pm	**Arizona State**	**Arizona**	Arizona Stadium • Tucson, AZ (Territorial Cup)	ESPN	**ASU** 41–34		
November 24	12:00 p.m.	No. 5 **Oregon**	No. 16 **Oregon State**	Reser Stadium • Corvallis, OR (Civil War)	Pac-12 Networks	**ORE** 48–24		
November 24	3:30 p.m.	No. 11 **Stanford**	No. 15 **UCLA**	Rose Bowl • Pasadena, CA	FOX	**STAN** 35–17	68,228	
November 24	5:00 pm	No. 1 Notre Dame	**USC**	Los Angeles Memorial Coliseum • Los Angeles, CA (Notre Dame – USC rivalry)	ABC	**L** 22–13		
^{#}Rankings from AP Poll released prior to game. All times are in Pacific Time.

=== Week 14 (Pac-12 Championship Game) ===
Date	Time	Visiting team	Home team	Site	TV	Result	Attendance	Ref.
November 30	5:00 p.m.	#17 UCLA	No. 8 Stanford	Stanford Stadium • Stanford, California (2012 Pac-12 Football Championship Game)	FOX	**STAN** 27–24	31,622	
^{#}Rankings from AP Poll released prior to game. All times are in Pacific Time.

== Records against other conferences ==
=== Pac-12 vs. BCS matchups ===
Date	Visitor	Home	Winning team	Opponent Conference	Notes
September 8	#18 Oklahoma State	**Arizona**	**Arizona**	Big 12	Arizona scores the most points against OSU since the 2008 edition of the Bedlam Series against Oklahoma.
September 8	Illinois	**Arizona State**	**Arizona State**	Big Ten	Arizona State goes 3–1 against Illinois following a loss the previous season in Champaign.
September 8	#13 Wisconsin	**Oregon State**	**Oregon State**	Big Ten	Oregon State's first win over a ranked opponent since a November 2010 defeat of USC.
September 8	**Washington**	#3 LSU	LSU	SEC	Washington fails to score a touchdown for the first time since an October 2010 matchup against Stanford.
September 8	Duke	#25 **Stanford**	**Stanford**	ACC	Stanford goes 3–1 against Duke, with three straight wins, with touchdowns coming on offense, defense, and special teams for the first time since a September 2009 game against San Jose State.
September 8	#2 **USC**	Syracuse	**USC**	Big East	USC quarterback Matt Barkley throws for six touchdown passes, a school record.
September 8	#16 Nebraska	**UCLA**	**UCLA**	Big Ten	UCLA's second win against Nebraska in eight meetings since 1973.
September 15	**California**	Ohio State	Ohio State	Big Ten	
September 15	**Arizona State**	Missouri	Missouri	SEC	
October 13	#17 **Stanford**	#7 Notre Dame	Notre Dame	Independent	Stanford's first series loss to Notre Dame since 2008.
November 24	#1 Notre Dame	**USC**	Notre Dame	Independent	With the win, Notre Dame completed a perfect 12–0 regular season.

=== Bowl games ===
The Pac-12 is participating in the following bowls (Pac-12 teams in bold):

Bowl Game	Date	Stadium	City	Television	Time (PST)	Team	Score	Team	Score
New Mexico Bowl	December 15	University Stadium	Albuquerque, New Mexico	ESPN	10:00 a.m.	**Arizona**	49	Nevada	48
Maaco Bowl Las Vegas	December 22	Sam Boyd Stadium	Paradise, Nevada	ESPN	1:30 p.m.	#20 Boise State	28	**Washington**	26
Holiday Bowl	December 27	Qualcomm Stadium	San Diego, California	ESPN	6:45 p.m.	Baylor	49	#17 **UCLA**	26
Kraft Fight Hunger Bowl	December 29	AT&T Park	San Francisco, California	ESPN	1:00 p.m.	**Arizona State**	62	Navy	28
Alamo Bowl	December 29	Alamodome	San Antonio, Texas	ESPN	3:45 p.m.	Texas	31	#15 **Oregon State**	27
Sun Bowl	December 31	Sun Bowl Stadium	El Paso, Texas	CBS	11:00 a.m.	Georgia Tech	21	**USC**	7
Rose Bowl	January 1	Rose Bowl	Pasadena, California	ESPN	2:10 p.m.	#8 **Stanford**	20	Wisconsin	14
Fiesta Bowl	January 3	University of Phoenix Stadium	Glendale, Arizona	ESPN	5:30 p.m.	#5 **Oregon**	35	#7 Kansas State	17

== Players of the week ==
Following each week of games, Pac-12 conference officials select the players of the week from the conference's teams.

Week	Offensive			Defensive			Special teams		
Week	Player	Position	Team	Player	Position	Team	Player	Position	Team
9/3/12	Johnathan Franklin	RB	UCLA	Jake Fischer	LB	ARIZ	Marqise Lee	KR	USC
9/10/12	Johnathan Franklin	RB	UCLA	D.J. Welch	LB	OSU	John Bonano	K	ARIZ
9/17/12	Stepfan Taylor	RB	STAN	Ben Gardner	DE	STAN	Tom Hackett	P	UTAH
9/24/12	Jordan Webb	QB	COLO	Michael Clay	LB	ORE	Keith Kostol	P	OSU
10/1/12	Sean Mannion	QB	OSU	Will Sutton	DT	ASU	Kyle Dugandzic	P	ARIZ
10/8/12	Josh Nunes	QB	STAN	Cameron Jackson	DB	CAL	Randall Telfer	TE	USC
10/15/12	Cody Vaz	QB	OSU	Steve Williams	DB	CAL	Rashad Ross	WR/KR	ASU
10/22/12	Matt Barkley	QB	USC	Chase Thomas	LB	STAN	Richard Morrison	WR/PR	ARIZ
10/29/12	Marqise Lee	WR	USC	Marquis Flowers	LB	ARIZ	Reggie Dunn	WR/KR	UTAH
11/5/12	Kenjon Barner	RB	ORE	Eric Kendricks	LB	UCLA	Reggie Dunn	WR/KR	UTAH
11/12/12	Ka'Deem Carey	RB	ARIZ	Anthony Barr	LB	UCLA	Trevor Romaine	PK	ORE
11/19/12	Zach Ertz	TE	STAN	Eric Kendricks	LB	UCLA	Daniel Zychlinski	P	STAN
11/26/12	Stepfan Taylor	RB	STAN	Brandon Magee	LB	ASU	Andrew Furney	PK	WSU

=== Position key ===
Center	C	Cornerback	CB	Defensive back	DB	Defensive end	DE
Defensive lineman	DL	Defensive tackle	DT	Guard	G	Kickoff returner	KR
Offensive tackle	OT	Offensive lineman	OL	Linebacker	LB	Long snapper	LS
Punter	P	Placekicker	PK	Punt returner	PR	Quarterback	QB
Running back	RB	Safety	S	Tight end	TE	Wide receiver	WR

== Home game attendance ==
Team	Stadium	Capacity	Game 1	Game 2	Game 3	Game 4	Game 5	Game 6	Game 7	Game 8	Total	Average	% of Capacity
Arizona	Arizona Stadium	57,400	48,670	45,602	43,919	44,153	50,148	47,822	51,236		331,550	47,364	82.52%
Arizona State	Sun Devil Stadium	71,706	48,658	54,128	58,107	71,004	55,672	53,438	—	—	341,007	56,835	79.26%
California	California Memorial Stadium	62,717	63,186	57,745	51,634	57,643	61,024	42,226	57,672	—	391,130	55,876	89.09%
Colorado	Folsom Field	53,613	46,843	46,893	45,161	44,138	43,148		—	—	225,183	45,237	84.38%
Oregon	Autzen Stadium	54,000	56,144	55,755	57,091	58,334	58,792	57,521	58,792	—	402,429	57,490	106.46%
Oregon State	Reser Stadium	45,674	^{A}	42,189	46,579	45,769	45,979	43,779		—	224,295	44,859	98.22%
Stanford	Stanford Stadium	50,000	40,577	44,016	50,360				—	—	134,953	44,984	89.97%
UCLA	Rose Bowl	91,136	71,530	53,723	54,636	66,303	81,673	83,277	68,228	—	479,370	68,481	75.14%
USC	Los Angeles Memorial Coliseum	93,607	93,607	83,421						—	177,028	88,514	94.56%
Utah	Rice-Eccles Stadium	45,017	45,273	45,653	46,037	45,017	45,069	45,031	—	—	272,080	45,347	100.73%
Washington	CenturyLink Field ^{B}	67,000	53,742	54,922	55,941	66,202	60,842		—	—	230,807	57,702	86.12%
Washington State	Martin Stadium	35,117	33,598	31,668	60,929^{C}	27,339	28,110		—	—	153,534	38,384	89.08%

^AOregon State's home game against Nicholls State was postponed due to Nicholls State's inability to travel due to Hurricane Isaac.
^BDue to reconstruction at Husky Stadium, Washington play their 2012 home games at CenturyLink Field.
^CThis was an official Washington State home game played versus Oregon at CenturyLink Field.

== Notes ==
- July 24, 2012 – 2012 Media Day at Gibson Amphitheatre.
- September 4, 2012 – After Week 1, UCLA is tied for first in sacks with 6.
- September 8, 2012 - Three Pac-12 teams upset ranked opponents: Arizona defeats #18 Oklahoma State, Oregon State prevails over #13 Wisconsin, and UCLA holds off #16 Nebraska.
- September 9, 2012 - Five Pac-12 teams are ranked in the Top 25: #2 USC, #4 Oregon, #21 Stanford, #22 UCLA, #24 Arizona.
- November 3, 2012 – Oregon is the first team to ever score 60 points on USC in 124 years.
- November 8, 2012 – USC was reprimanded and fined by the conference for illegally deflated game balls by a student manager during the Oregon game on November 3, 2012.
- November 20, 2012 – Three days after the close of the season, head coach Jeff Tedford was relieved of his duties at California.

== Awards and honors ==
Doak Walker Award

- 2nd - Johnathan Franklin, UCLA; 3rd - Kenjon Barner, Oregon

Johnny Unitas Golden Arm Award

Maxwell Award

Walter Camp Player of the Year Award

=== All-Americans ===
Academic All-America Team Member of the Year (CoSIDA)

AFCA Coaches' All-Americans First Team:

=== All-Pac-12 teams ===
- Offensive Player of the Year: Marqise Lee, WR, USC
- Pat Tillman Defensive Player of the Year: Will Sutton, DE, Arizona State
- Offensive Freshman of the Year: Marcus Mariota, QB, Oregon
- Defensive Freshman of the Year: Leonard Williams, DE, USC
- Coach of the Year: David Shaw, Stanford

Offense:

Pos.	Name	Yr.	School	Name	Yr.	School
First Team				Second Team		
QB	Marcus Mariota	Fr.	Oregon	Matt Scott	Sr.	Arizona
RB	Kenjon Barner	Sr.	Oregon	Johnathan Franklin	Sr.	UCLA
RB	Ka'Deem Carey	So.	Arizona	Stepfan Taylor	Sr.	Stanford
WR	Marqise Lee	So.	USC	Austin Hill	So.	Arizona
WR	Markus Wheaton	Sr.	Oregon St.	Robert Woods	Jr.	USC
TE	Zach Ertz	Sr.	Stanford	Austin Seferian-Jenkins	So.	Washington
OL	Hroniss Grasu	So.	Oregon	David Bakhtiari	Jr.	Colorado
OL	Khaled Holmes	Sr.	USC	Sam Brenner	Sr.	Utah
OL	Brian Schwenke	Sr.	California	Jeff Baca	Sr.	UCLA
OL	Xavier Su'a-Filo	So.	UCLA	Kevin Danser	Sr.	Stanford
OL	David Yankey	Jr.	Stanford	Sam Schwartzstein	Sr.	Stanford

Defense:

Pos.	Name	Yr.	School	Name	Yr.	School
First Team				Second Team		
DL	Scott Crichton	So.	Oregon St.	Henry Anderson	Jr.	Stanford
DL	Dion Jordan	Sr.	Oregon	Morgan Breslin	Jr.	USC
DL	Star Lotulelei	Sr.	Utah	Ben Gardner	Sr.	Stanford
DL	Will Sutton	Jr.	Arizona St.	Datone Jones	Sr.	UCLA
LB	Anthony Barr	Jr.	UCLA	Kiko Alonso	Sr.	Oregon
LB	Trent Murphy	Sr.	Stanford	Michael Clay	Sr.	Oregon
LB	Chase Thomas	Sr.	Stanford	Brandon Magee	Sr.	Arizona St.
DB	Ifo Ekpre-Olomu	So.	Oregon	Deone Bucannon	Jr.	Washington St.
DB	Jordan Poyer	Sr.	Oregon St.	Alden Darby	Jr.	Arizona St.
DB	Ed Reynolds	Jr.	Stanford	T. J. McDonald	Sr.	USC
DB	Desmond Trufant	Sr.	Washington	Nickell Robey	Jr.	USC

Specialists:

Pos.	Name	Yr.	School	Name	Yr.	School
First Team				Second Team		
PK	Vince D'Amato	Jr.	California	Andrew Furney	Jr.	Washington St.
P	Jeff Locke	Sr.	UCLA	Josh Hubner	Sr.	Arizona St.
RS	Reggie Dunn	Sr.	Utah	Marqise Lee	So.	USC
ST	Jordan Jenkins	Sr.	Oregon St.	David Allen	Sr.	UCLA

=== All-Academic ===
First team

Pos.	Name	School	Yr.	GPA	Major
QB	Connor Wood	Colorado	So.	3.55	Finance
RB	Jared Baker	Arizona	RS Fr.	3.56	Undeclared
RB	Patrick Skov	Stanford	So.	3.41	Undeclared
WR	Andrei Lintz	Washington State	RS Sr.	3.72	Sport Management
WR	Luke Matthews	Utah (2)	Sr.	3.69	Mass Communication
TE	Koa Ka'ai	Oregon	RS Fr.	3.94	History
OL	Chris Adcock	California	So.	3.57	Business Administration
OL	Jake Brendel	UCLA	RS Fr.	3.60	Math/Applied Science
OL	Khaled Holmes	USC	Sr.	3.31	Communication
OL	Tevita Stevens	Utah (2)	Sr.	3.54	Spanish
OL	Matt Summers-Gavin	California	Sr.	3.27	Political Science
DL	Henry Anderson	Stanford	Jr.	3.43	Political Science
DL	Nate Bonsu	Colorado	Jr.	3.42	International Affairs
DL	Will Pericak	Colorado (2)	RS Sr.	3.45	Accounting
DL	Danny Shelton	Washington	So.	3.47	Anthropology
LB	Dave Fagergren	Utah	Sr.	3.51	Business
LB	Jake Fischer	Arizona (2)	Jr.	3.32	Marketing
LB	Brandon Johnson	Arizona State	RS Jr.	3.44	Sociology
DB	Brian Blechen	Utah	Jr.	3.18	Sociology
DB	Jordan Richards	Stanford	So.	3.34	Undeclared
DB	Eric Rowe	Utah	So.	3.54	Undeclared
DB	Jared Tevis	Arizona	So.	3.25	Finance
PK	John Bonano	Arizona (3)	Sr.	3.93	Physiology
P	Jeff Locke	UCLA (3)	RS Sr.	3.70	Economics
ST	Justin Gorman	Colorado	RS So.	3.61	Finance
Notes:		(2) Two-time, (3) Three-time			

== 2013 NFL draft ==
Round	Overall pick	NFL team	Player	Position	College
1	3	Miami Dolphins	Dion Jordan	Defensive end	Oregon
1	14	Carolina Panthers	Star Lotulelei	Defensive tackle	Utah
1	20	Chicago Bears	Kyle Long	Guard	Oregon
1	22	Atlanta Falcons	Desmond Trufant	Cornerback	Washington
1	26	Green Bay Packers	Datone Jones	Defensive end	UCLA
2	35	Philadelphia Eagles	Zach Ertz	Tight end	Stanford
2	41	Buffalo Bills	Robert Woods	Wide receiver	USC
2	46	Buffalo Bills	Kiko Alonso	Linebacker	Oregon
3	71	St. Louis Rams	T. J. McDonald	Safety	USC
3	76	San Diego Chargers	Keenan Allen	Wide receiver	California
3	79	Pittsburgh Stealers	Markus Wheaton	Wide receiver	Oregon State
4	98	Philadelphia Eagles	Matt Barkley	Quarterback	USC
4	107	Tennessee Titans	Brian Schwenke	Center	California
4	109	Green Bay Packers	David Bakhtiari	Offensive tackle	Colorado
4	121	Indianapolis Colts	Khaled Holmes	Center	USC
4	125	Green Bay Packers	Johnathan Franklin	Runningback	UCLA
4	133	Atlanta Falcons	Levine Toilolo	Tight end	Stanford
5	140	Arizona Cardinals	Stepfan Taylor	Runningback	Stanford
5	145	San Diego Chargers	Steve Williams	Cornerback	California
5	155	Minnesota Vikings	Jeff Locke	Punter	UCLA
6	172	Oakland Raiders	Nick Kasa	Tight end	Colorado
6	182	Carolina Panthers	Kenjon Barner	Runningback	Oregon
6	192	Indianapolis Colts	John Boyett	Safety	Oregon
6	196	Minnesota Vikings	Jeff Baca	Guard	UCLA
7	212	Philadelphia Eagles	Joe Kruger	Defensive end	Utah
7	218	Philadelphia Eagles	Jordan Poyer	Cornerback	Oregon State
7	236	Chicago Bears	Marquess Wilson	Wide receiver	Washington State
7	247	Baltimore Ravens	Marc Anthony	Cornerback	California
