= 2012 UCLA Bruins football team =

American college football season

2012 UCLA Bruins football

Pac-12 South Division champion

Pac-12 Championship Game, L 24–27 vs. Stanford

Holiday Bowl, L 26–49 vs. Baylor
- Conference: Pac-12 Conference
- South Division
- Record: 9–5 (6–3 Pac-12)
- Head coach: Jim L. Mora (1st season)
- Offensive coordinator: Noel Mazzone (1st season)
- Offensive scheme: Multiple
- Defensive coordinator: Lou Spanos (1st season)
- Base defense: 4–3
- Home stadium: Rose Bowl

2012 Pac-12 Conference football standings
| | Conf. | | | Overall |
| Team | W | | L | W | | L |
|---|---|---|---|---|---|---|
North Division
| No. 7 Stanford xy$ | 8 | – | 1 | 12 | – | 2 |
| No. 2 Oregon x% | 8 | – | 1 | 12 | – | 1 |
| No. 20 Oregon State | 6 | – | 3 | 9 | – | 4 |
| Washington | 5 | – | 4 | 7 | – | 6 |
| California | 2 | – | 7 | 3 | – | 9 |
| Washington State | 1 | – | 8 | 3 | – | 9 |
South Division
| UCLA xy | 6 | – | 3 | 9 | – | 5 |
| Arizona State | 5 | – | 4 | 8 | – | 5 |
| USC | 5 | – | 4 | 7 | – | 6 |
| Arizona | 4 | – | 5 | 8 | – | 5 |
| Utah | 3 | – | 6 | 5 | – | 7 |
| Colorado | 1 | – | 8 | 1 | – | 11 |
Championship: Stanford 27, UCLA 24
$ – BCS representative as conference champion; % – BCS at-large representative; x – Division champion/co-champions; y – Championship game participant; Rankings from AP Poll

The 2012 UCLA Bruins football team represented the University of California, Los Angeles in the 2012 NCAA Division I FBS football season. The team was coached by first year head coach Jim L. Mora and played its home games at the Rose Bowl in Pasadena, California. They were members of the South Division of the Pac-12 Conference. The Bruins won the conference's South Division and played in the Holiday Bowl, where they lost 26–49 to Baylor. UCLA finished the season 9–5, including 6–3 in conference play, and outscored their opponents by a combined total of 482 to 386.

== Media ==
The radio broadcast team members on flagship station KLAC-AM 570 are Chris Roberts, play-by-play; Matt Stevens, analyst; and Wayne Cook, sidelines.

== Spring practice ==
- April 3 – Spring practice started
- May 5 – Spring game at the Rose Bowl

== Schedule ==
| Date | Time | Opponent | Rank | Site | TV | Result | Attendance |
|---|---|---|---|---|---|---|---|
| August 30 | 4:30 pm | at Rice* | | Rice Stadium; Houston, TX | CBSSN | W 49–24 | 23,105 |
| September 8 | 4:30 pm | No. 16 Nebraska* | | Rose Bowl; Pasadena, CA | FOX | W 36–30 | 71,530 |
| September 15 | 7:30 pm | Houston* | No. 22 | Rose Bowl; Pasadena, CA | P12N | W 37–6 | 53,723 |
| September 22 | 12:30 pm | Oregon State | No. 19 | Rose Bowl; Pasadena, CA | ABC | L 20–27 | 54,636 |
| September 29 | 3:00 pm | at Colorado | | Folsom Field; Boulder, CO | P12N | W 42–14 | 46,893 |
| October 6 | 7:00 pm | at California | No. 25 | California Memorial Stadium; Berkeley, CA (rivalry) | P12N | L 17–43 | 57,643 |
| October 13 | 12:00 pm | Utah | | Rose Bowl; Pasadena, CA | FOX | W 21–14 | 66,303 |
| October 27 | 12:00 pm | at Arizona State | | Sun Devil Stadium; Tempe, AZ | FX | W 45–43 | 55,672 |
| November 3 | 7:30 pm | No. 24 Arizona^{†} | No. 25 | Rose Bowl; Pasadena, CA | P12N | W 66–10 | 81,673 |
| November 10 | 7:30 pm | at Washington State | No. 17 | Martin Stadium; Pullman, WA | ESPN2 | W 44–36 | 28,110 |
| November 17 | 12:00 pm | No. 21 USC | No. 17 | Rose Bowl; Pasadena, CA (Victory Bell) | FOX | W 38–28 | 83,277 |
| November 24 | 3:30 pm | No. 11 Stanford | No. 15 | Rose Bowl; Pasadena, CA (rivalry) | FOX | L 17–35 | 68,228 |
| November 30 | 5:00 pm | at No. 8 Stanford | No. 17 | Stanford Stadium; Stanford, CA (Pac-12 Championship Game) | FOX | L 24–27 | 31,622 |
| December 27 | 6:45 pm | vs. Baylor* | No. 17 | Qualcomm Stadium; San Diego, CA (Holiday Bowl) | ESPN | L 26–49 | 55,507 |
*Non-conference game; ^{†}Homecoming; Rankings from AP Poll released prior to the game; All times are in Pacific time

== Rankings ==
Ranking movements Legend: ██ Increase in ranking ██ Decrease in ranking — = Not ranked RV = Received votes
| | Week | | | | | | | | | | | | | | | |
| Poll | Pre | 1 | 2 | 3 | 4 | 5 | 6 | 7 | 8 | 9 | 10 | 11 | 12 | 13 | 14 | Final |
|---|---|---|---|---|---|---|---|---|---|---|---|---|---|---|---|---|
| AP | — | — | 22 | 19 | RV | 25 | — | — | RV | 25 | 17 | 17 | 15 | 17 | 17 | RV |
| Coaches | — | — | 23 | 19 | RV | RV | — | RV | RV | RV | 19 | 16 | 16 | 16 | 19 | RV |
| Harris | Not released | | | | | | RV | RV | RV | RV | 21 | 19 | 16 | 16 | 17 | Not released |
| BCS | Not released | | | | | | | — | — | — | 18 | 17 | 17 | 16 | 17 | Not released |

== Key players ==
Offense

- No. 9 Jerry Johnson (receiver)
- No. 15 Devin Lucien (receiver)
- No. 56 Xavier Su'a-Filo (left tackle)
- No. 64 Greg Capella (center)
- No. 60 Jeff Baca (right guard)
- No. 77 Torian White (right tackle)
- No. 4 Kevin Prince (quarterback)
- No. 12 Richard Brehaut (quarterback)
- No. 17 Brett Hundley (quarterback)
- No. 23 Johnathan Franklin (running back)
- No. 33 Steven Manfro (running back)
- No. 54 Jake Brendel (center)
- No. 78 Brett Downey (right tackle)
- No. 41 David Allen (full back)
- No. 3 Darius Bell (WR-Y)
- No. 8 Joseph Fauria (tight end)

Defense

- No. 7 Tevin McDonald (defensive safety)
- No. 56 Datone Jones (left defensive end)
- No. 94 Owamagbe Odighizuwa (left defensive end)
- No. 92 Brandon Willis (nose tackle)
- No. 99 Cassius Marsh (right defensive end)
- No. 35 Jordan Zumwalt (left outside linebacker)
- No. 59 Keenan Graham (left outside linebacker)
- No. 30 Eric Kendricks (right inside linebacker)
- No. 43 Damien Holmes (right outside linebacker)
- No. 22 Sheldon Price (left cornerback)
- No. 11 Anthony Barr (right outside linebacker)
- No. 98 Seali’i Epenesa (nose tackle)
- No. 21 Aaron Hester (right cornerback)
- No. 26 Andrew Abbott (SS)
- No. 19 Dalton Hilliard (SS)

== Game summaries ==
=== Rice ===
| | 1 | 2 | 3 | 4 | Total |
|---|---|---|---|---|---|
| UCLA | 19 | 16 | 0 | 14 | 49 |
| Rice | 10 | 14 | 0 | 0 | 24 |

UCLA leads the series 4–0, last winning 26–16 on September 9, 2006 at the Rose Bowl. Brett Hundley started at quarterback.

Johnathan Franklin rushed for 214 yards and three touchdowns in this rout. UCLA dominated both in the air with 303 yards passing compared to 184 yards for Rice, and on the ground with 343 yards rushing compared to 174 for Rice. This was despite Rice having about 8 1/2 minutes more of possession than UCLA. Franklin's performance was 2 yards short of a career high. Hundley took the first snap of the game 72 yards for a touchdown. Hundley completed 21 of 28 passes for 202 yards and rushed for 79 yards on 7 carries.

Rice was led by quarterback Taylor McHargue, who completed 17 of 28 passes for 179 yards with one interception; and had 129 yards rushing.

1st quarter scoring: UCLA – Brett Hundley 72 Yd Run (Pat Blocked); UCLA – Jerry Johnson 11 Yd Pass From Brett Hundley (Pat Blocked); UCLA – Johnathan Franklin 74 Yd Run (Kaʻimi Fairbairn Kick); RICE – Luke Willson 8 Yd Pass From Taylor McHargue (Chris Boswell Kick); RICE – Chris Boswell 53 Yd FG

2nd quarter scoring: RICE – Taylor McHargue 1 Yd Run (Chris Boswell Kick); UCLA – Kaʻimi Fairbairn 27 Yd FG; UCLA – Johnathan Franklin 78 Yd Run (Kaʻimi Fairbairn Kick); RICE – Sam McGuffie 2 Yd Pass From Taylor McHargue (Chris Boswell Kick); UCLA – Damien Holmes 44 Yd Fumble Return (Pat Blocked)

3rd quarter scoring: None

4th quarter scoring: UCLA – Joseph Fauria 4 Yd Pass From Brett Hundley (Two-Point Pass Conversion Failed); UCLA – Johnathan Franklin 22 Yd Run (Brett Hundley Pass To David Allen For Two-Point Conversion)

=== Nebraska ===
| | 1 | 2 | 3 | 4 | Total |
|---|---|---|---|---|---|
| #16 Nebraska | 14 | 10 | 3 | 3 | 30 |
| UCLA | 7 | 17 | 3 | 9 | 36 |

Nebraska led the series 6–4 and UCLA was 3–2 at home against the Cornhuskers. Former player James McAlister was the game's honorary captain.

Johnathan Franklin rushed for 217 yards for an average of 8.3 yards per carry, which placed him at 7th place of the UCLA rushing record list.

1st quarter scoring: UCLA – Joseph Fauria 27 Yd Pass From Brett Hundley (Kaʻimi Fairbairn Kick); NEB – Ameer Abdullah 6 Yd Run (Brett Maher Kick); NEB – Taylor Martinez 92 Yd Run (Brett Maher Kick)

2nd quarter scoring: UCLA – Kaʻimi Fairbairn 35 Yd FG; UCLA – Joseph Fauria 4 Yd Pass From Brett Hundley (Kaʻimi Fairbairn Kick); NEB – Ameer Abdullah 17 Yd Run (Brett Maher Kick); UCLA – Steven Manfro 49 Yd Pass From Brett Hundley (Kaʻimi Fairbairn Kick); NEB – Brett Maher 54 Yd FG

3rd quarter scoring: UCLA – Kaʻimi Fairbairn 22 Yd FG; NEB – Brett Maher 43 Yd FG

4th quarter scoring: UCLA – Taylor Martinez Tackled By Datone Jones In End Zone; UCLA – Johnathan Franklin 9 Yd Pass From Brett Hundley (Kaʻimi Fairbairn Kick); NEB – Brett Maher 40 Yd FG

With this victory, UCLA was ranked in the AP Top 25 poll for the first time since 2007.

=== Houston ===
| | 1 | 2 | 3 | 4 | Total |
|---|---|---|---|---|---|
| Houston | 0 | 0 | 0 | 6 | 6 |
| #22 UCLA | 14 | 3 | 13 | 7 | 37 |

Houston and UCLA are tied 3–3 in the series with the Cougars winning at home last season.

The Bruins led the Cougars in first downs (29–14), net yards rushing (247–139), net yards passing (320–249), and total offense yards (567–388). Brett Hundley completed 27 of 42 passes with 2 interceptions for 320 yards. His longest pass was a 40-yard pass to Johnathan Franklin. Franklin moved into second place of the UCLA rushing record list when he rushed for 117 yards on 25 carries.

1st quarter scoring: UCLA – Eric Kendricks 23 Yd Fumble Return (Kaʻimi Fairbairn Kick); UCLA – Datone Jones 7 Yd Pass From Brett Hundley (Kaʻimi Fairbairn Kick)

2nd quarter scoring: UCLA – Kaʻimi Fairbairn 35 Yd FG

3rd quarter scoring: UCLA – Jordon James 12 Yd Pass From Brett Hundley (Kaʻimi Fairbairn Kick); UCLA – Kaʻimi Fairbairn 23 Yd; UCLA – Kaʻimi Fairbairn 33 Yd

4th quarter scoring: HOU – David Piland 86 Yd Run (Two-Point Run Conversion Failed); UCLA – Steven Manfro 14 Yd Run (Kaʻimi Fairbairn Kick)

=== Oregon State ===
| | 1 | 2 | 3 | 4 | Total |
|---|---|---|---|---|---|
| Oregon State | 3 | 14 | 7 | 3 | 27 |
| #19 UCLA | 0 | 10 | 0 | 10 | 20 |

UCLA leads the all-time series 41–15–4; Last Meeting, UCLA 27, Oregon State 19 (2011 at Corvallis, Ore.). Former quarterback Matt Stevens is the honorary captain.

1st quarter scoring: ORST – Trevor Romaine 22 Yd FG

2nd quarter scoring: UCLA – Kaʻimi Fairbairn 22 Yd FG; ORST – Brandin Cooks 75 Yd Pass From Sean Mannion (Trevor Romaine Kick); ORST – Markus Wheaton 42 Yd Pass From Sean Mannion (Trevor Romaine Kick); UCLA – Shaquelle Evans 65 Yd Pass From Brett Hundley (Kaʻimi Fairbairn Kick)

3rd quarter scoring: ORST – Storm Woods 2 Yd Run (Trevor Romaine Kick)

4th quarter scoring: UCLA – Brett Hundley 1 Yd Run (Kaʻimi Fairbairn Kick); ORST – Trevor Romaine 17 Yd FG; UCLA – Kaʻimi Fairbairn 35 Yd FG

=== Colorado ===
| | 1 | 2 | 3 | 4 | Total |
|---|---|---|---|---|---|
| UCLA | 7 | 14 | 7 | 14 | 42 |
| Colorado | 0 | 7 | 0 | 7 | 14 |

UCLA leads the series 5–2; UCLA won last year, 45–6, in the Rose Bowl.

1st quarter scoring: UCLA – Brett Hundley 12 Yd Run (Kaʻimi Fairbairn Kick)

2nd quarter scoring: UCLA -Darius Bell 17 Yd Pass From Brett Hundley (Kaʻimi Fairbairn Kick); COLO – Dustin Ebner 17 Yd Pass From Jordan Webb (Will Oliver Kick); UCLA – Brett Hundley 1 Yd Run (Kaʻimi Fairbairn Kick)

3rd quarter scoring: UCLA – Joseph Fauria 8 Yd Pass From Brett Hundley (Kaʻimi Fairbairn Kick)

4th quarter scoring: UCLA – Jordon James 25 Yd Run (Kaʻimi Fairbairn Kick); UCLA – Damien Thigpen 23 Yd Run (Kaʻimi Fairbairn Kick); COLO – Nick Kasa 31 Yd Pass From Nick Hirschman (Will Oliver Kick)

=== California ===
| | 1 | 2 | 3 | 4 | Total |
|---|---|---|---|---|---|
| #25 UCLA | 7 | 0 | 7 | 3 | 17 |
| California | 3 | 13 | 13 | 14 | 43 |

The Bruins look to end their losing streak at Memorial Stadium dating back to the 1999 season. Terry Leyden is the referee for the game.

UCLA is the Pac-12 leader in total offense (560.4 yards per game) and in scoring offense (3rd) at 36.8 per game. Their rushing offense is No. 2, led by Johnathan Franklin with 697 yards and their passing game is No. 4. Defensively, UCLA leads the conference with nine interceptions.

1st quarter scoring: UCLA – Cassius Marsh 4 Yd Pass From Brett Hundley (Kaʻimi Fairbairn Kick); CAL – Vincenzo D'Amato 26 Yd FG

2nd quarter scoring: CAL – C.J. Anderson 5 Yd Pass From Zach Maynard (Vincenzo D'Amato Kick); CAL – Keenan Allen 8 Yd Pass From Zach Maynard (Pat Blocked)

3rd quarter scoring: CAL – Brendan Bigelow 32 Yd Pass From Zach Maynard (Vincenzo D'Amato Kick); UCLA – Joseph Fauria 3 Yd Pass From Brett Hundley (Kaʻimi Fairbairn Kick); CAL – Keenan Allen 34 Yd Pass From Zach Maynard (Pat Blocked)

4th quarter scoring: UCLA – Kaʻimi Fairbairn 29 Yd FG; CAL – Zach Maynard 1 Yd Run (Vincenzo D'Amato Kick); CAL – C.J. Anderson 68 Yd Run (Vincenzo D'Amato Kick)

=== Utah ===
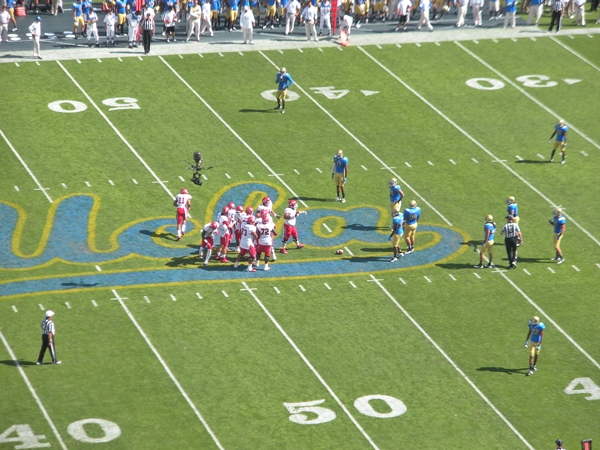
Utah vs. UCLA at the Rose Bowl

| | 1 | 2 | 3 | 4 | Total |
|---|---|---|---|---|---|
| Utah | 7 | 0 | 0 | 7 | 14 |
| UCLA | 14 | 0 | 7 | 0 | 21 |

1st quarter scoring: UCLA – Brett Hundley 12 Yd Run (Kaʻimi Fairbairn Kick); UTAH – Ryan Lacy 0 Yd Fumble Return (Coleman Petersen Kick); UCLA – Shaquelle Evans 64 Yd Pass From Brett Hundley (Kaʻimi Fairbairn Kick)

2nd quarter scoring: None

3rd quarter scoring: UCLA – Johnathan Franklin 3 Yd Run (Kaʻimi Fairbairn Kick)

4th quarter scoring: UTAH – Dres Anderson 1 Yd Pass From Jon Hays (Coleman Petersen Kick)

=== Arizona State ===
| | 1 | 2 | 3 | 4 | Total |
|---|---|---|---|---|---|
| UCLA | 14 | 7 | 14 | 10 | 45 |
| Arizona State | 14 | 3 | 9 | 17 | 43 |

UCLA leads the series, 17–10–1. Last season, UCLA downed ASU 29–28 at the Rose Bowl, a last second field goal attempt by the Sun Devils was just off the mark.

1st quarter scoring: ASU – Kevin Ozier 7 Yd Pass From Taylor Kelly (Alex Garoutte Kick); ASU – Marion Grice 2 Yd Run (Alex Garoutte Kick); UCLA – Johnathan Franklin 3 Yd Run (Kaʻimi Fairbairn Kick); UCLA – Devin Fuller 15 Yd Pass From Brett Hundley (Kaʻimi Fairbairn Kick)

2nd quarter scoring: ASU – Jon Mora 36 Yd FG; UCLA – Johnathan Franklin 5 Yd Run (Kaʻimi Fairbairn Kick)

3rd quarter scoring: ASU – Jon Mora 31 Yd; UCLA – Damien Thigpen 65 Yd Pass From Brett Hundley (Kaʻimi Fairbairn Kick); ASU – Marion Grice 20 Yd Pass From Taylor Kelly (Two-Point Pass Conversion Failed); UCLA – Joseph Fauria 4 Yd Pass From Brett Hundley (Kaʻimi Fairbairn Kick)

4th quarter scoring: ASU – Marion Grice 8 Yd Pass From Taylor Kelly (Alex Garoutte Kick); UCLA – Damien Thigpen 20 Yd Pass From Brett Hundley (Kaʻimi Fairbairn Kick); ASU – Jon Mora 22 Yd FG; ASU – D. J. Foster 7 Yd Pass From Taylor Kelly (Alex Garoutte Kick); UCLA – Kaʻimi Fairbairn 33 Yd

=== Arizona ===
| | 1 | 2 | 3 | 4 | Total |
|---|---|---|---|---|---|
| #22 Arizona | 0 | 3 | 7 | 0 | 10 |
| UCLA | 21 | 21 | 10 | 14 | 66 |

UCLA's homecoming game and honoring veterans day. UCLA leads the series 19–15–2. UCLA leads 11–4–2 in Los Angeles (8–4–1 in the Rose Bowl) and Arizona leads 11–8 at Tucson.

1st quarter scoring: UCLA – Johnathan Franklin 37 Yd Run (Kaʻimi Fairbairn Kick); UCLA – Brett Hundley 6 Yd Run (Kaʻimi Fairbairn Kick); UCLA – Jordan Payton 17 Yd Pass From Brett Hundley (Kaʻimi Fairbairn Kick)

2nd quarter scoring: UCLA – Damien Thigpen 1 Yd Run (Kaʻimi Fairbairn Kick); ARIZ – John Bonano 28 Yd FG; UCLA – Johnathan Franklin 2 Yd Run (Kaʻimi Fairbairn Kick); Joseph Fauria 1 Yd Pass From Brett Hundley (Kaʻimi Fairbairn Kick)

3rd quarter scoring: UCLA – Kaʻimi Fairbairn 25 Yd FG; ARIZ – Ka'Deem Carey 2 Yd Run (John Bonano Kick); UCLA – Joseph Fauria 28 Yd Pass From Brett Hundley (Kaʻimi Fairbairn Kick)

4th quarter scoring: UCLA – Steven Manfro 14 Yd Run (Kaʻimi Fairbairn Kick); UCLA – Melvin Emesibe 1 Yd Run (Kaʻimi Fairbairn Kick)

=== Washington State ===
| | 1 | 2 | 3 | 4 | Total |
|---|---|---|---|---|---|
| #18 UCLA | 7 | 30 | 7 | 0 | 44 |
| Washington State | 7 | 0 | 14 | 15 | 36 |

The Bruins lead the series 18–39–1, which was started in 1928.

1st quarter scoring: UCLA – Sheldon Price 68 Yd Return Of Blocked Field Goal (Kaʻimi Fairbairn Kick); WSU – Dominique Williams 6 Yd Pass From Connor Halliday (Andrew Furney Kick)

2nd quarter scoring: UCLA – Johnathan Franklin 16 Yd Pass From Brett Hundley (Kaʻimi Fairbairn Kick); UCLA – Joseph Fauria 9 Yd Pass From Brett Hundley (Kaʻimi Fairbairn Kick); UCLA – Connor Halliday Tackled By Anthony Barr In End Zone; UCLA – Devin Fuller 10 Yd Pass From Brett Hundley (Kaʻimi Fairbairn Kick); UCLA – Eric Kendricks 40 Yd Fumble Return (Kaʻimi Fairbairn Kick)

3rd quarter scoring: WSU – Brett Bartolone 7 Yd Pass From Connor Halliday (Andrew Furney Kick); UCLA – Jordon James 2 Yd Run (Kaʻimi Fairbairn Kick); WSU – Marcus Mason 4 Yd Pass From Connor Halliday (Andrew Furney Kick)

4th quarter scoring: WSU – Dominique Williams 11 Yd Pass From Connor Halliday (Andrew Furney Kick); WSU – Kristoff Williams 3 Yd Pass From Connor Halliday (Connor Halliday Pass To Dominique Williams For Two-Point Conversion)

=== USC ===
| | 1 | 2 | 3 | 4 | Total |
|---|---|---|---|---|---|
| #18 USC | 0 | 14 | 6 | 8 | 28 |
| #17 UCLA | 17 | 7 | 7 | 7 | 38 |

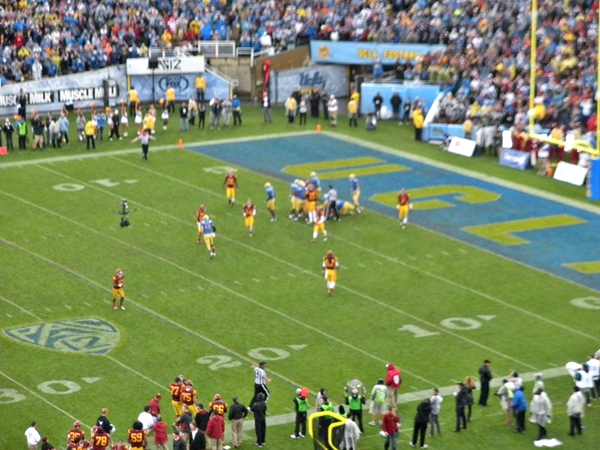
UCLA defeats USC 38–28 in the Rose Bowl

The matchup was the first time since 2005 that UCLA and USC met as ranked teams. It was also the first time since 2001 that the Bruins entered the game ranked higher than the Trojans.

Jim Colletto, who played football and baseball at UCLA, was the honorary captain for this game. The former Super Bowl XXXV coach was a Bruins coach on the team last defeated USC, 13–9. Shawn Hochuli was the referee.

1st quarter scoring: UCLA – Brett Hundley 1 Yd Run (Kaʻimi Fairbairn Kick); UCLA – Kaʻimi Fairbairn 23 Yd FG, UCLA – Joseph Fauria 17 Yd Pass From Brett Hundley (Kaʻimi Fairbairn Kick)

2nd quarter scoring: UCLA – Johnathan Franklin 16 Yd Run (Kaʻimi Fairbairn Kick); USC – Nelson Agholor 33 Yd Pass From Matt Barkley (Andre Heidari Kick); USC – Randall Telfer 2 Yd Pass From Matt Barkley (Andre Heidari Kick)

3rd quarter scoring: USC – George Uko Recovered Fumble In End Zone (Pat Failed); UCLA – Brett Hundley 3 Yd Run (Kaʻimi Fairbairn Kick)

4th quarter scoring: USC – Marqise Lee 14 Yd Pass From Matt Barkley (Matt Barkley Pass To Robert Woods For Two-Point Conversion) UCLA – Johnathan Franklin 29 Yd Run (Kaʻimi Fairbairn Kick)

=== Stanford ===
| | 1 | 2 | 3 | 4 | Total |
|---|---|---|---|---|---|
| #11 Stanford | 7 | 14 | 14 | 0 | 35 |
| #15 UCLA | 7 | 3 | 7 | 0 | 17 |

Stanford defeated UCLA 35–17 and clinch the Pac-12 Conference North Division championship, setting up a rematch with UCLA the following week in the Pac-12 Championship Game. UCLA quarterback Brett Hundley, in one of his poorest games of the season, was sacked seven times while completing 20 of 38 passes for 261 yards with one touchdown and one interception. The Bruins were penalized 12 times for 135 yards.

1st quarter scoring: STAN – Drew Terrell 11-yard pass from Kevin Hogan (Jordan Williamson kick); UCLA – Joseph Fauria, 13-yard pass from Brett Hundley (Ka'i Fairbairn kick)

2nd quarter scoring: STAN – Anthony Wilkerson 10-yard run (Williamson kick); STAN – Stepfan Taylor 49-yard run (Williamson kick); UCLA – Fairbairn 48-yard field goal

3rd quarter scoring: STAN – Taylor 1-yard run (Williamson kick); STAN – Usua Amanam 11-yard fumble recovery (Williamson kick); UCLA – Johnathan Franklin 11-yard run (Fairbairn kick)

=== Stanford (Pac-12 Conference Championship) ===
| | 1 | 2 | 3 | 4 | Total |
|---|---|---|---|---|---|
| #17 UCLA | 14 | 0 | 10 | 0 | 24 |
| #8 Stanford | 7 | 10 | 0 | 10 | 27 |

1st quarter scoring: UCLA – Johnathan Franklin 51-yard run (Kaʻimi Fairbairn kick); STAN – Kevin Hogan 2-yard run (Jordan Williamson kick); UCLA – Brett Hundley 5-yard Run (Fairbairn kick)

2nd quarter scoring: STAN – Stepfan Taylor 1-yard run (Williamson Kick); STAN – Williamson 37-yard field goal

3rd quarter scoring: UCLA – Fairbairn 31-yard field goal; UCLA – Franklin 20-yard run (Fairbairn kick)

4th quarter scoring: STAN – Drew Terrell 26-yard pass from Hogan (Williamson kick); STAN – Williamson 36-yard field goal

=== Baylor (Holiday Bowl) ===
| | 1 | 2 | 3 | 4 | Total |
|---|---|---|---|---|---|
| Baylor | 14 | 21 | 7 | 7 | 49 |
| #17 UCLA | 0 | 10 | 3 | 13 | 26 |

The Bruins played the Baylor Bears (7–5) of the Big 12 Conference in the first meeting ever between the two teams.

1st quarter scoring: Baylor – Glasco Martin 4-yard run (Aaron Jones kick); Baylor – Antwan Goodley 8-yard pass from Nick Florence (Jones kick)

2nd quarter scoring: Baylor – Tevin Reese 55-yard pass from Florence (Jones kick); UCLA – Joseph Fauria 22-yard pass from Brett Hundley (Kaʻimi Fairbairn kick); Baylor – Martin 26-yard run (Jones kick); Baylor – Lache Seastrunk 43-yard run (Jones kick); UCLA – Fairbairn 30-yard field goal

3rd quarter scoring: UCLA – Fairbairn 40-yard field goal; Baylor – Martin 1-yard run (Jones kick)

4th quarter scoring: UCLA – Shaquelle Evans 24-yard pass from Hundley (two-point pass conversion failed); Baylor – Florence 1-yard run (Jones kick); UCLA – Logan Sweet 34-yard pass from Hundley (Fairbairn kick)

== Coaches ==
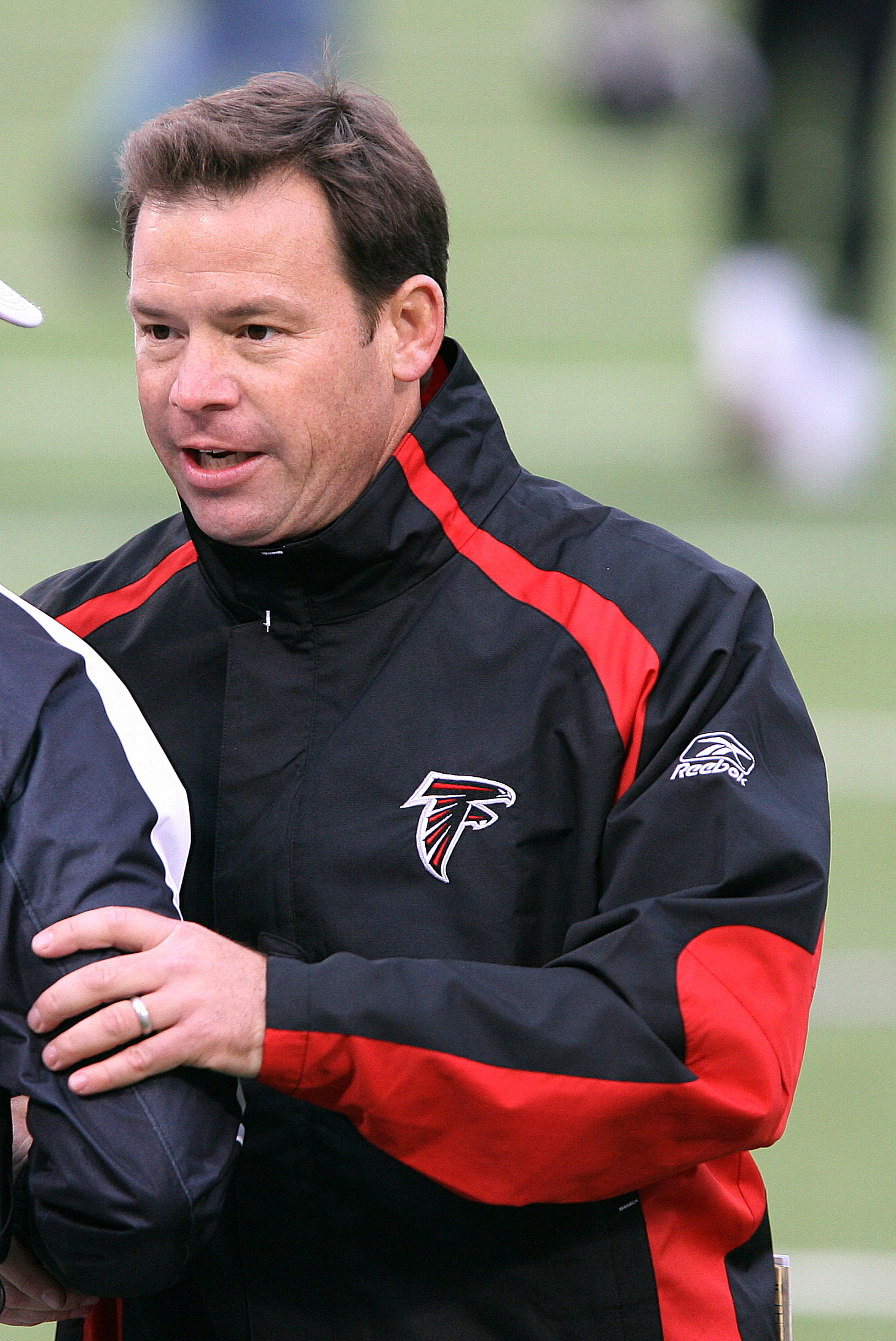
Head coach Jim L. Mora

- Jim L. Mora, head coach
- Noel Mazzone, offensive coordinator/quarterbacks
- Adrian Klemm, offensive line
- Lou Spanos, defensive coordinator
- Marques Tuiasosopo, Y receivers
- Steve Broussard, running backs
- Jeff Ulbrich, special teams, linebackers
- Demetrice Martin, secondary
- Eric Yarber, wide receivers
- Angus McClure, defensive line/recruiting coordinator

== High school signees ==
College recruiting
| Name | Hometown | School | Height | Weight | 40^{‡} | Commit date |
|---|---|---|---|---|---|---|
| Aaron Porter; MLB | La Habra, CA | La Habra High School | 6 ft 2 in (1.88 m) | 230 lb (100 kg) | 4.7 | Jul 4, 2011 |
| Aaron Porter; MLB | Recruit ratings: Scout: Rivals: 247Sports: ESPN: (80) | | | | | |
| Jordan Payton; WR | Westlake Village, CA | Oaks Christian High School | 6 ft 2 in (1.88 m) | 200 lb (91 kg) | 4.5 | Feb 1, 2012 |
| Jordan Payton; WR | Recruit ratings: Scout: Rivals: 247Sports: ESPN: (80) | | | | | |
| Randall Goforth; CB | Long Beach, CA | Long Beach Polytechnic High School | 5 ft 10 in (1.78 m) | 170 lb (77 kg) | 4.5 | Feb 1, 2012 |
| Randall Goforth; CB | Recruit ratings: Scout: Rivals: 247Sports: ESPN: (79) | | | | | |
| Javon Williams; WR | Chandler, AZ | Chandler High School | 6 ft 5 in (1.96 m) | 180 lb (82 kg) | N/A | Feb 1, 2012 |
| Javon Williams; WR | Recruit ratings: Scout: Rivals: 247Sports: ESPN: (78) | | | | | |
| Ahmaad Harris; WR | Suwanee, GA | Peachtree Ridge High School | 5 ft 8 in (1.73 m) | 170 lb (77 kg) | N/A | Feb 1, 2012 |
| Ahmaad Harris; WR | Recruit ratings: Scout: Rivals: 247Sports: (NR) | | | | | |
| Kenneth Walker; ATH | Richmond, CA | John F. Kennedy High School | 6 ft 0 in (1.83 m) | 175 lb (79 kg) | 4.4 | Jan 31, 2012 |
| Kenneth Walker; ATH | Recruit ratings: Scout: Rivals: 247Sports: ESPN: (76) | | | | | |
| Simon Goines; OT | Katy, TX | Central High School | 6 ft 8 in (2.03 m) | 290 lb (130 kg) | N/A | Jan 30, 2012 |
| Simon Goines; OT | Recruit ratings: Scout: Rivals: 247Sports: ESPN: (78) | | | | | |
| Devin Fuller; ATH | Old Tappan, NJ | Northern Valley Regional High School | 6 ft 1 in (1.85 m) | 190 lb (86 kg) | N/A | Jan 29, 2012 |
| Devin Fuller; ATH | Recruit ratings: Scout: Rivals: 247Sports: ESPN: (82) | | | | | |
| Jeremy Castro; OLB | Murrieta, CA | Vista Murrieta High School | 6 ft 1 in (1.85 m) | 240 lb (110 kg) | N/A | Jan 22, 2012 |
| Jeremy Castro; OLB | Recruit ratings: Scout: Rivals: ESPN: (77) | | | | | |
| Nate Iese; DE | Elk Grove, CA | Sheldon High School | 6 ft 4 in (1.93 m) | 240 lb (110 kg) | N/A | Jan 20, 2012 |
| Nate Iese; DE | Recruit ratings: Scout: Rivals: 247Sports: ESPN: (76) | | | | | |
| T.J. Millweard; QB | Forthworth, TX | All Saints Episcopal High School | 6 ft 4 in (1.93 m) | 215 lb (98 kg) | 4.7 | Jan 17, 2012 |
| T.J. Millweard; QB | Recruit ratings: Scout: Rivals: 247Sports: ESPN: (80) | | | | | |
| Ellis McCarthy; DT | Monrovia, CA | Monrovia High School | 6 ft 5 in (1.96 m) | 305 lb (138 kg) | 4.9 | Jan 16, 2012 |
| Ellis McCarthy; DT | Recruit ratings: Scout: Rivals: 247Sports: ESPN: (82) | | | | | |
| Fabian Moreau; WR | Davie, FL | Western High School (Davie, Florida) | 6 ft 0 in (1.83 m) | 175 lb (79 kg) | 4.4 | Jan 14, 2012 |
| Fabian Moreau; WR | Recruit ratings: Scout: Rivals: 247Sports: ESPN: (72) | | | | | |
| Colby Cyburt; OT | Mission Viejo, CA | Mission Viejo High School | 6 ft 5 in (1.96 m) | 270 lb (120 kg) | N/A | Jan 12, 2012 |
| Colby Cyburt; OT | Recruit ratings: Scout: Rivals: 247Sports: ESPN: (77) | | | | | |
| Carl Hulick; C | Anaheim, CA | Esperanza High School | 6 ft 2 in (1.88 m) | 285 lb (129 kg) | N/A | Jan 8, 2012 |
| Carl Hulick; C | Recruit ratings: Scout: Rivals: 247Sports: ESPN: (68) | | | | | |
| Ishmael Adams; CB | Westlake Village, CA | Oaks Christian High School | 5 ft 10 in (1.78 m) | 185 lb (84 kg) | 4.45 | Dec 26, 2011 |
| Ishmael Adams; CB | Recruit ratings: Scout: Rivals: 247Sports: ESPN: (80) | | | | | |
| Alexandru Ceachir; OT | Santa Monica, CA | Santa Monica Community College | 6 ft 5 in (1.96 m) | 300 lb (140 kg) | 5.00 | Dec 22, 2011 |
| Alexandru Ceachir; OT | Recruit ratings: Scout: Rivals: 247Sports: (NR) | | | | | |
| Taylor Lagace; S | Arcadia, CA | Arcadia High School | 6 ft 1 in (1.85 m) | 200 lb (91 kg) | 4.50 | Dec 19, 2011 |
| Taylor Lagace; S | Recruit ratings: Scout: Rivals: 247Sports: ESPN: (77) | | | | | |
| Kenny Orjioke; OLB | Marietta, GA | Lassiter High School | 6 ft 4 in (1.93 m) | 220 lb (100 kg) | N/A | Dec 19, 2011 |
| Kenny Orjioke; OLB | Recruit ratings: Scout: Rivals: 247Sports: ESPN: (77) | | | | | |
| Marcus Rios; CB | Elk Grove, CA | Cosumnes Oaks High School | 6 ft 0 in (1.83 m) | 170 lb (77 kg) | N/A | Dec 18, 2011 |
| Marcus Rios; CB | Recruit ratings: Scout: Rivals: 247Sports: ESPN: (79) | | | | | |
| Paul Perkins; CB | Chandler, AZ | Chandler High School | 5 ft 10 in (1.78 m) | 175 lb (79 kg) | N/A | Dec 4, 2011 |
| Paul Perkins; CB | Recruit ratings: Scout: Rivals: 247Sports: ESPN: (74) | | | | | |
| Justin Combs; CB | New Rochelle, NY | Iona Preparatory School | 5 ft 9 in (1.75 m) | 170 lb (77 kg) | N/A | Nov 29, 2011 |
| Justin Combs; CB | Recruit ratings: Scout: Rivals: 247Sports: ESPN: (76) | | | | | |
| Lacy Westbrook; OG | Compton, CA | Dominguez High School | 6 ft 5 in (1.96 m) | 300 lb (140 kg) | N/A | Nov 3, 2011 |
| Lacy Westbrook; OG | Recruit ratings: Scout: Rivals: 247Sports: ESPN: (78) | | | | | |
| Kaʻimi Fairbairn; K | Honolulu, HI | Punahou School | 6 ft 0 in (1.83 m) | 165 lb (75 kg) | N/A | Nov 3, 2011 |
| Kaʻimi Fairbairn; K | Recruit ratings: Scout: Rivals: 247Sports: ESPN: (74) | | | | | |
| Eli Ankou; DE | Bear, DE | Red Lion Christian Academy | 6 ft 3 in (1.91 m) | 250 lb (110 kg) | N/A | Jul 8, 2011 |
| Eli Ankou; DE | Recruit ratings: Scout: Rivals: 247Sports: ESPN: (75) | | | | | |
| Ian Taubler; TE | Fresno, CA | Bullard High School | 6 ft 4 in (1.93 m) | 240 lb (110 kg) | N/A | Jun 24, 2011 |
| Ian Taubler; TE | Recruit ratings: Scout: Rivals: 247Sports: ESPN: (75) | | | | | |
Overall recruit ranking: Scout: 12 Rivals: 13 247Sports: 19 ESPN: 19
Note: In many cases, Scout, Rivals, 247Sports, On3, and ESPN may conflict in their listings of height and weight.; In these cases, the average was taken. ESPN grades are on a 100-point scale.; Sources: "2012 Team Ranking". Rivals.com.

== Notes ==
- July 24, 2012 – 2012 Media Day at Gibson Amphitheatre.
- August 4, 2012 – Preseason camp begins at California State University, San Bernardino.
- August 18, 2012 – Meet the Bruins fan event at Drake Stadium.
- September 3, 2012 – Running back Johnathan Franklin was named Pac-12 offensive Player-of-the-week.
- September 4, 2012 – After week 1, UCLA is ranked 1st in sacks with 6; first in conference in rushing offense (343 yards), and total offense (646 yards) Johnathan Franklin is third nationally in rushing (214 yards) and first in conference
- September 9, 2012 – UCLA is ranked No. 22 in the AP Poll, first time ranked since 2007.
- September 10, 2012 – Franklin was named Pac-12 offensive Player-of-the-week for two weeks in a row, leading the nation with an average of 215.5 yards per game.
- November 3, 2012 – Tailback Johnathan Franklin became UCLA's all-time leading rusher with 3,873 yards for his career, passing Gaston Green's 3,731 yards.
- November 5, 2012 – Linebacker Eric Kendricks was named Pac-12 defensive Player-of-the-week.
- November 12, 2012 – Linebacker Anthony Barr was named Pac-12 defensive Player-of-the-week.
- November 13, 2012 – UCLA served notice to the USC Marching Band that its drum major will not be allowed to stab a sword into Bruins logo before the game in the Rose Bowl on November 17, 2012.
- November 17, 2012 – The Rose Bowl Stadium press box will be known as the Terry Donahue Pavilion in the fall, 2013.
- November 19, 2012 – Linebacker Eric Kendricks was named Pac-12 defensive Player-of-the-week again, second time in three weeks; three times in a row for UCLA.
- December 2, 2012 – Johnathan Franklin and Anthony Barr were named the team's most valuable players at the annual banquet.
- December 5, 2012 – Former offensive tackle Jonathan Ogden was enshrined into the College Football Hall of Fame.
- December 6, 2012 – Franklin was voted second best running back in the nation in the Doak Walker Award, finishing just behind Montee Ball of Wisconsin.
- December 27, 2012 – A new school record for points scored in a season (482) was set when Brett Hundley passed to Logan Sweet for a 34-yard a touchdown late in the fourth quarter of the Holiday Bowl game.

== Awards and honors ==
Eight Bruins were selected to the 2012 Pac-12 Conference Football All-Academic team:

- First team – Senior punter Jeff Locke (third time) and center Jake Brendel
- Second team – Running back Steven Manfro
- Honorable mention – Junior linebacker Anthony Barr, redshirt junior linebacker Todd Golper, redshirt sophomore linebacker Ryan Hofmeister, redshirt sophomore linebacker Eric Kendricks and senior long-snapper Kevin McDermott
