= 2012 Washington State Cougars football team =

American college football season

2012 Washington State Cougars football
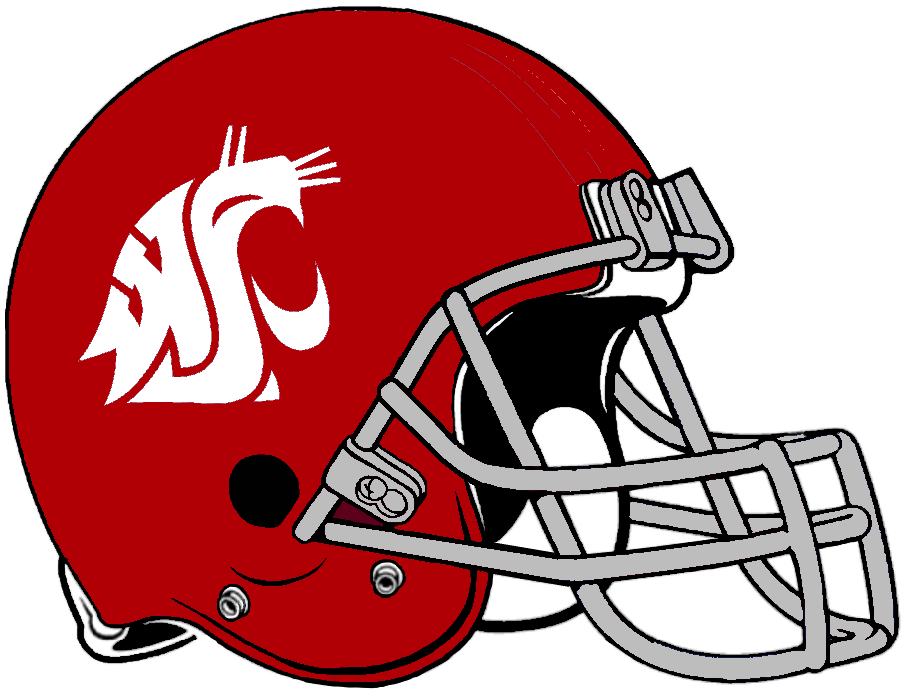

- Conference: Pac-12 Conference
- North Division
- Record: 3–9 (1–8 Pac-12)
- Head coach: Mike Leach (1st season)
- Offensive scheme: Air raid
- Defensive coordinator: Mike Breske (1st season)
- Base defense: Multiple 3–4
- Home stadium: Martin Stadium

2012 Pac-12 Conference football standings
	Conf.			Overall
Team	W		L	W		L
North Division
No. 7 Stanford xy$	8	–	1	12	–	2
No. 2 Oregon x%	8	–	1	12	–	1
No. 20 Oregon State	6	–	3	9	–	4
Washington	5	–	4	7	–	6
California	2	–	7	3	–	9
Washington State	1	–	8	3	–	9
South Division
UCLA xy	6	–	3	9	–	5
Arizona State	5	–	4	8	–	5
USC	5	–	4	7	–	6
Arizona	4	–	5	8	–	5
Utah	3	–	6	5	–	7
Colorado	1	–	8	1	–	11
Championship: Stanford 27, UCLA 24
$ – BCS representative as conference champion; % – BCS at-large representative; x – Division champion/co-champions; y – Championship game participant; Rankings from AP Poll

The 2012 Washington State Cougars football team represented Washington State University during the 2012 NCAA Division I FBS football season. Led by first-year head coach Mike Leach, the Cougars played their home games on campus at Martin Stadium in Pullman, Washington. They were members of the North Division of the Pac-12 Conference and finished the season 3–9 overall, 1–8 in Pac-12, and last place in the North Division.

== Schedule ==
Date	Time	Opponent	Site	TV	Result	Attendance
August 30	7:15 pm	at BYU*	LaVell Edwards Stadium; Provo, UT	ESPN	L 6–30	57,045
September 8	12:00 pm	No. 9 (FCS) Eastern Washington*	Martin Stadium; Pullman, WA	P12N	W 24–20	33,598
September 14	6:00 pm	at UNLV*	Sam Boyd Stadium; Whitney, NV	ESPN	W 35–27	17,015
September 22	1:00 pm	Colorado^{†}	Martin Stadium; Pullman, WA	Fox	L 34–35	31,668
September 29	7:30 pm	vs. No. 2 Oregon	CenturyLink Field; Seattle, WA	ESPN2	L 26–51	60,929
October 6	3:00 pm	at No. 14 Oregon State	Reser Stadium; Corvallis, OR	P12N	L 6–19	46,579
October 13	7:30 pm	California	Martin Stadium; Pullman, WA	P12N	L 17–31	27,339
October 27	3:15 pm	at No. 19 Stanford	Stanford Stadium; Stanford, CA	P12N	L 17–24	41,496
November 3	12:00 pm	at Utah	Rice–Eccles Stadium; Salt Lake City, UT	P12N	L 6–49	45,069
November 10	7:30 pm	No. 17 UCLA	Martin Stadium; Pullman, WA	ESPN2	L 36–44	28,110
November 17	12:00 pm	at Arizona State	Sun Devil Stadium; Tempe, AZ	P12N	L 7–46	53,438
November 23	12:30 pm	No. 25 Washington	Martin Stadium; Pullman, WA (Apple Cup)	Fox	W 31–28 ^{OT}	30,544
*Non-conference game; ^{†}Homecoming; Rankings from AP Poll released prior to the game; All times are in Pacific time

== Game summaries ==
=== BYU ===
Washington State at BYU

Team	1	2	3	4	Total
Washington St	0	6	0	0	6
• BYU	7	17	6	0	30

- Date: August 30
- Location: LaVell Edwards Stadium, Provo, Utah
- Television network: ESPN

On a nationally televised broadcast, Mike Leach's first game as head coach of the Washington State Cougars was a 30-6 blowout loss to BYU, the former Texas Tech coach's alma mater. Despite Leach's offenses being typically known for their high scoring shootouts, the Wazzu Cougars were unable to score a single touchdown. This marked the first time that a Leach-led offense failed to score a touchdown since 2006, when Texas Tech lost to TCU 12-3. Wazzu quarterback Jeff Tuel threw for 228 yards and two interceptions, while the offense ran for -4 yards on the ground. The only points for the Washington State Cougars came from two field goals in the second quarter. BYU now leads the series 3–1.

=== Eastern Washington ===
Of Note: Andrew Furney made a 60 yard field goal at the end of the first half, which would ultimately prove the difference.

Eastern Washington at Washington State

Team	1	2	3	4	Total
Eastern Washington	7	7	0	6	20
• Washington St	14	10	0	0	24

- Date: September 8
- Location: Martin Stadium, Pullman, Washington
- Television network: Pac-12 Network

=== UNLV ===
Washington State at UNLV

Team	1	2	3	4	Total
• Washington St	14	14	0	7	35
UNLV	7	13	0	7	27

- Date: September 14
- Location: Sam Boyd Stadium, Las Vegas, Nevada
- Television network: ESPN

=== Colorado ===
Colorado at Washington State

Team	1	2	3	4	Total
• Colorado	7	0	7	21	35
Washington St	7	14	7	6	34

- Date: September 22
- Location: Martin Stadium, Pullman, Washington
- Television network: FX

=== Oregon ===
#2 Oregon at Washington State

Team	1	2	3	4	Total
• Oregon	20	3	21	7	51
Washington State	9	10	0	7	26

- Date: September 29
- Location: CenturyLink Field, Seattle, Washington
- Television network: ESPN2

=== Oregon State ===
Washington State at #14 Oregon State

Team	1	2	3	4	Total
Washington St	0	3	0	3	6
• Oregon St	3	3	7	6	19

- Date: October 6
- Location: Reser Stadium, Corvallis, Oregon
- Television network: Pac-12 Network

1st quarter scoring: ORST - Trevor Romaine 30-yard field goal.

2nd quarter scoring: WSU - Andrew Furney 24-yard field goal; ORST - Trevor Romaine 24-yard field goal GOOD.

3rd quarter scoring:

4th quarter scoring:

=== California ===
California at Washington State

Team	1	2	3	4	Total
• California	7	7	10	7	31
Washington St	0	3	7	7	17

- Date: October 13
- Location: Martin Stadium, Pullman, Washington
- Television network: Pac-12 Network

=== Stanford ===
Washington State at Stanford

Team	1	2	3	4	Total
Washington St	0	10	0	7	17
• Stanford	3	7	7	7	24

- Date: October 27
- Location: Stanford Stadium, Stanford, California
- Television network: Pac-12 Network

=== Utah ===
Washington State at Utah

Team	1	2	3	4	Total
Washington St	0	0	0	6	6
• Utah	14	17	8	10	49

- Date: November 3
- Location: Rice-Eccles Stadium, Salt Lake City, Utah
- Television network: Pac-12 Network

=== UCLA ===
#17 UCLA at Washington State

Team	1	2	3	4	Total
• UCLA	7	30	7	0	44
Washington St	7	0	14	15	36

- Date: November 10
- Location: Martin Stadium, Pullman, Washington
- Television network: ESPN2

The Bruins lead the series 18-39-1, which was started in 1928.

Hours before the game, the Cougars' star receiver Marquess Wilson said in a press release that he has left the program because of the actions of first-year coach Mike Leach and his staff. Wilson was suspended earlier in the week for an unspecified violation of team rules. Wilson said the new staff has "preferred to belittle, intimidate and humiliate us." That included physical abuse, Wilson said.

1st quarter scoring: UCLA – Sheldon Price 68-yard blocked field goal return (Kaʻimi Fairbairn kick); Dominique Williams 6-yard pass from Connor Halliday (Andrew Furney kick)

2nd quarter scoring: UCLA - Johnathan Franklin 16-yard pass from Brett Hundley (Fairbairn kick); UCLA – Joseph Fauria 9-yard pass from Hundley (Fairbairn kick); UCLA – Anthony Barr safety; UCLA – Devin Fuller 10-yard pass from Hundley (Fairbairn kick); UCLA – Eric Kendricks 40-yard fumble recovery (Fairbairn kick)

3rd quarter scoring: WSU - Brett Bartolone 7-yard pass from Halliday (Furney kick); UCLA – Jordon James 2-yard run (Fairbairn kick); WSU - Marcus Mason 4-yard pass from Halliday (Furney kick)

4th quarter scoring: WSU - Dominique Williams 11-yard pass from Halliday (Furney kick); WSU - Kristoff Williams 3-yard pass from Halliday (Dominique Williams pass from Halliday 2-point conversion)

=== Arizona State ===
Washington State at Arizona State

Team	1	2	3	4	Total
Washington St	0	0	0	7	7
• Arizona St	18	14	14	0	46

- Date: November 17
- Location: Sun Devil Stadium, Tempe, Arizona
- Television network: Pac-12 Network

=== Washington ===
#25 Washington at Washington State
Apple Cup

Team	1	2	3	4	OT	Total
Washington	0	7	21	0	0	28
• Washington St	3	7	0	18	3	31

- Date: November 23
- Location: Martin Stadium, Pullman, Washington
- Game start: 3:30 p.m. EST
- Television network: Fox

Scoring summary
1	1:52	WSU	Andrew Furney 21-yard field goal	Wash St 3-0
2	12:59	WASH	Austin Seferian-Jenkins 11-yard pass from Keith Price (Travis Coons kick)	Washington 7-3
2	9:19	WSU	Carl Winston 1-yard run (Andrew Furney kick)	Wash St 10-7
3	8:20	WASH	Cody Burns 15-yard pass from Keith Price (Travis Coons kick)	Washington 14-10
3	5:32	WASH	Bishop Sankey 2-yard run (Travis Coons kick)	Washington 21-10
3	:54	WASH	Bishop Sankey 1-yard run (Travis Coons kick)	Washington 28-10
4	10:41	WSU	Carl Winston 2-yard run (Andrew Furney kick)	Washington 28-17
4	7:26	WSU	Carl Winston 1-yard run (Brett Bartolone pass from Jeff Tuel)	Washington 28-25
4	1:59	WSU	Andrew Furney 42-yard field goal	Tie 28-28
OT		WSU	Andrew Furney 27-yard field goal	Wash St 31-28

Washington State's first win in the rivalry since 2008.

== Roster and coaching staff ==
2012 Washington State Cougars football team roster
Players
Coaches
Offense

Pos.	#	Name	Class
OL	68	Brent Anderson	RSo
WR	89	Blair Bomber	RSo
WR	25	Bennet Bontemps	Jr
OL	60	Elliott Bosch	RJr
OL	70	Jack Brevick	RJr
RB	23	Leon Brooks	RJr
QB	8	Jesse Brown	RFr
RB	34	Teondray Caldwell	Fr
OL	62	Moritz Christ	RFr
QB	13	Cody Clements	RFr
OL	72	Joe Dahl	RFr
WR	31	Rahmel Dockery	Fr
OL	67	Denzell Dotson	Fr
TE	88	Aaron Dunn	RSo
WR	17	Henry Eaddy	So
OL	63	Gunnar Eklund	RFr
OL	76	Rico Forbes	RJr
OL	77	John Fullington	Jr
RB	5	Rickey Galvin	RSo
QB	4	David Gilbertson	RJr
OL	64	Matt Goetz	RJr
QB	12	Connor Halliday	RSo
TE	41	Max Hersey	RFr
OL	55	Wade Jacobson	RSr
WR	22	Chandler Jenkins	RFr
OL	58	Zack Johnson	RSo
OL	78	Joe Kaleta	RSo
RB	36	Manuel Lamson	RFr
TE	87	Andrei Lintz	RSr
WR	32	Drew Loftus	RFr
RB	35	Marcus Mason	So
WR	85	Brett McDonald	RFr
WR	84	Daniel McDonald	RSo
OL	50	Taylor Meighen	Sr
WR	83	Isaiah Myers	So
WR	44	Ryan Nungester	Fr
WR	82	Bobby Ratliff	RSo
OL	69	Jake Rodgers	RSo
OL	74	Chas Sampson	RSr
TE	46	Mansel Simmons	RFr
WR	1	Geno Simone	Sr
OL	71	Dan Spitz	RSr
RB	29	Kruger Story	RFr
QB	10	Jeff Tuel	Sr
RB	30	Lawrence Tuiott	RFr
OL	61	Jeff Waldner	RSo
WR	80	Dominique Williams	RFr
WR	18	Kristoff Williams	RSo
WR	86	Marquess Wilson	Jr
RB	3	Carl Winston	Sr

Defense

Pos.	#	Name	Class
LB	46	John Taylor Altomare	Sr
DL	71	Matthew Brock	RJr
LB	55	Phillip Brandt	Sr
S	20	Deone Bucannon	Jr
LB	37	Jared Byers	RJr
S	4	Anthony Carpenter	RJr
CB	30	Tracy Clark	RSo
DE	90	Justin Clayton	RJr
LB	42	Cyrus Coen	So
DE	50	Adam Coerper	RSr
DE	96	Xavier Cooper	RFr
DT	97	David Davis	RFr
LB	53	Anthony DeMatteo	RSo
S	26	Tyrone Duckett	RSo
S	33	Max Gama	RFr
CB	32	Brandon Golden	RSo
DE	92	Hamza Griffin	RFr
DT	94	Steven Hoffart	RSr
CB	6	Damante Horton	Jr
DE	56	Ian Knight	RJr
LB	31	Kyle Lappano	RFr
LB	38	Corey Laufasa	RSr
DT	61	Anthony Laurenzi	RSr
S	22	Casey Locker	RJr
DE	89	Travis Long	Sr
LB	54	Darren Markle	RJr
DE	83	Logan Mayes	So
DB	17	Mike McAdie	So
S	39	Kyle McCartney	RSr
LB	13	Darryl Monroe	RFr
LB	21	Eric Oertel	Jr
DE	52	Darryl Paulo	RFr
S	25	Mitchell Peterson	RSo
DT	98	Kalafitoni Pole	RSo
LB	47	Tana Pritchard	RFr
DE	85	Jordan Pu'u Robinson	RJr
DE	95	Dylan Rabinowitz	RFr
DE	78	Eddie Releford	RFr
LB	51	Curtis Selz	RSo
CB	24	Daniel Simmons	RSr
S	36	Matthew Simmons	RSo
CB	35	Travion Smith	RSr
LB	45	Chester Su'a	So
S	15	Tyree Toomer	RSr
CB	29	Spencer Waseem	RFr
CB	2	Nolan Washington	RJr
DE	93	Lenard Williams	Sr

Special teams

Pos.	#	Name	Class
K	46	Michael Bowlin	Jr
LS	65	Alex Den Bleyker	So
K	49	Andrew Furney	Jr
LS	48	Zach Koepp	RSr
K	45	Tyler McNannay	RFr
LS	47	Ryan Saparto	RSo

Head coach

- Mike Leach

Coordinators/assistant coaches

- Eric Russell (Assistant head coach/special teams coordinator)
- Clay McGuire (offensive line)
- Jim Mastro (running backs)
- Eric Morris (inside receivers)
- Dennis Simmons (outside receivers)
- Mike Breske (defensive coordinator/defensive backs)
- Joe Salave'a (defensive line)
- Jeff Choate (linebackers)
- Paul Volero (outside linebackers)
- Antonio Huffman (football operations director)
- Dave Emerick (assoc. athletic director/ chief of staff for football)

Legend

- (C) Team captain
- (S) Suspended
- (I) Ineligible
- Injured
- Redshirt

Roster
Last update: April 14, 2012
