= Xavier Suʻa-Filo =

American football player (born 1991)

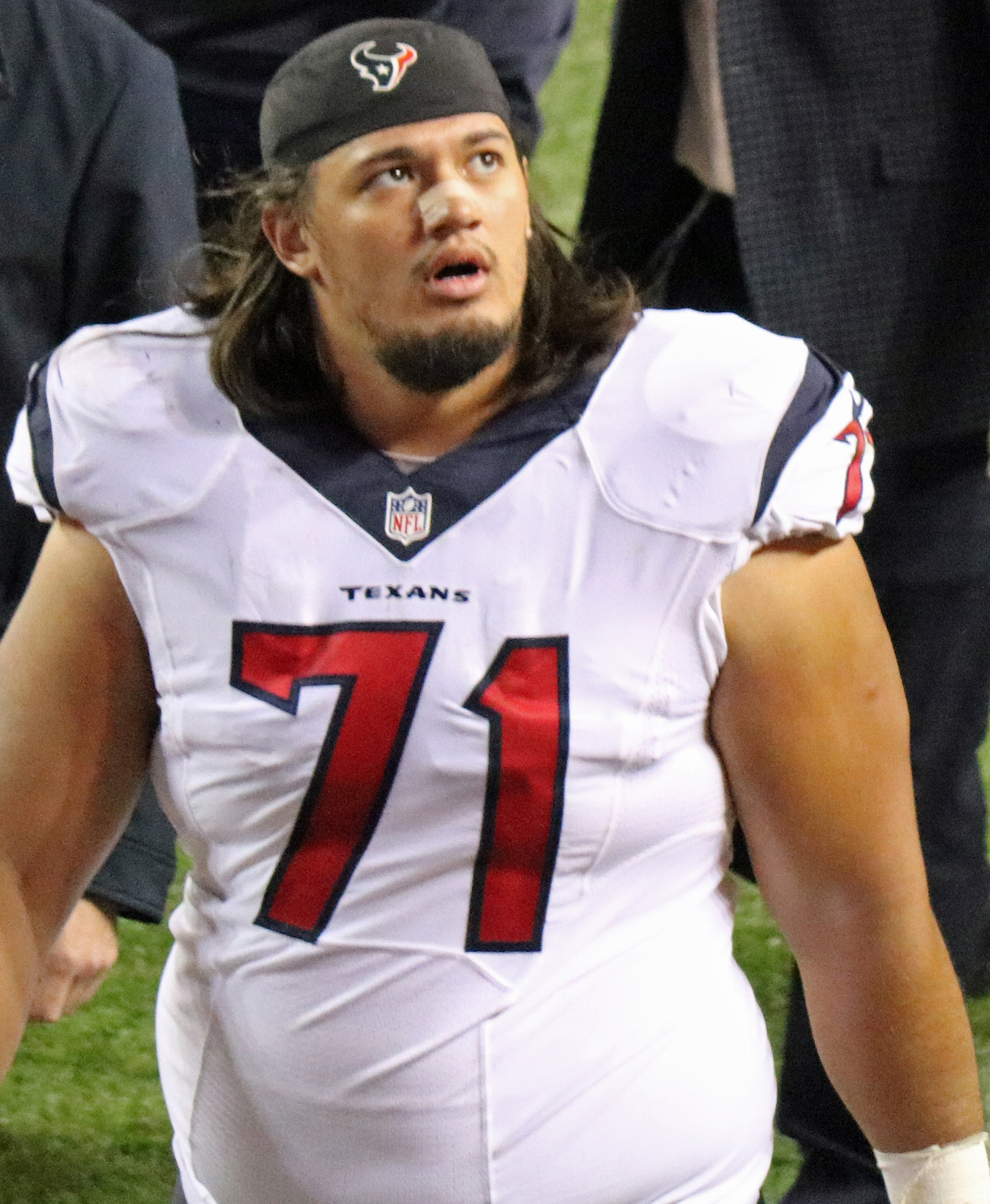
- Suʻa-Filo with the Houston Texans in 2016

Dallas Renegades
- Title: Offensive line coach

Personal information
- Born: January 1, 1991 (age 35); American Fork, Utah, U.S.
- Listed height: 6 ft 4 in (1.93 m)
- Listed weight: 310 lb (141 kg)

Career information
- Position: Guard (No. 71, 76, 72)
- High school: Timpview (Provo, Utah)
- College: UCLA (2009–2013)
- NFL draft: 2014: 2nd round, 33rd overall pick

Career history

Playing
- Houston Texans (2014–2017); Tennessee Titans (2018)*; Dallas Cowboys (2018–2019); Cincinnati Bengals (2020–2021)
- * Offseason or practice squad member only

Coaching
- Dallas Renegades (2026–present) Offensive line coach

Awards and highlights
- Morris Trophy (2013); Second-team All-American (2013); 2× First-team All-Pac-12 (2012, 2013)

Career NFL statistics
- Games played: 83
- Games started: 60
- Stats at Pro Football Reference

Xavier Filoitumua Suʻa-Filo (born January 1, 1991) is an American former professional football player who was a guard in the National Football League (NFL). He currently is the offensive line coach for the Dallas Renegades of the United Football League (UFL). He played college football for the UCLA Bruins, earning second-team All-American honors in 2013. He was selected by the Houston Texans in the second round of the 2014 NFL draft.

== Early life ==
A native of Pleasant Grove, Utah, Suʻa-Filo attended Timpview High School in Provo, Utah, where he was a three-year starter and a Parade magazine All-American offensive lineman.

He contributed to his school winning state championships in 2006, 2007 and 2008, while setting a state record for most consecutive wins (36). He was teammates with future NFL players Stephen Paea and Bronson Kaufusi.

As a senior, he was named the state of Utah 4A Offensive Player of the Year. He was regarded as a four-star recruit and was ranked as the number seven offensive tackle in his class by Rivals.com.

== College career ==
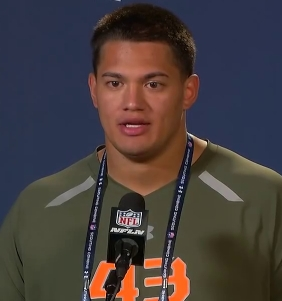
Suʻa-Filo at the 2014 NFL scouting combine.

Suʻa-Filo accepted a football scholarship from UCLA. As a freshman, he started all 13 games at left tackle. He became the first true freshman to start a season-opener on the offensive side of the ball for UCLA and also had the most starts by a true freshman at any non-kicking position in school history.

In 2010, he left school to serve a two-year Mormon mission in Florida and South Alabama. He rode a special ordered bike capable for his 300-pound frame during his mission work from January 2010 to December 2011.

In 2012, he returned and started all 14 games at left guard, while also seeing some action at left tackle. He helped running back Johnathan Franklin set a school record for most single-season rushing yards. As a junior, he started 7 games at left guard and 6 at left left tackle.

On January 5, 2014, he decided to forgo his senior year at UCLA and declared for the 2014 NFL draft. During his college career he started 19 games at left tackle and 21 at left guard.

== Professional career ==
Pre-draft measurables
Height	Weight	Arm length	Hand span	40-yard dash	10-yard split	20-yard split	20-yard shuttle	Three-cone drill	Vertical jump	Broad jump	Bench press
6 ft 4 1/8 in (1.93 m)	307 lb (139 kg)	33 3/8 in (0.85 m)	9 3/8 in (0.24 m)	4.97 s	1.75 s	2.94 s	4.44 s	7.60 s	26 in (0.66 m)	8 ft 7 in (2.62 m)	26 reps
All values from NFL Combine/Pro Day

=== Houston Texans ===
Suʻa-Filo was selected by the Houston Texans with the first pick in the second round (33rd overall) of the 2014 NFL draft, to become the highest selected UCLA Bruins offensive lineman since Jonathan Ogden in 1996. As a rookie, he missed all of the organized team activities because of his school's quarter system and played different positions along the offensive line during the preseason. He appeared in 13 games as a backup at left guard after not been able to pass Ben Jones on the depth chart. He started at right guard in place of an injured Brandon Brooks in the sixth game against the Indianapolis Colts.

In 2015, with the retirement of Chris Myers, Jones was moved to center and Suʻa-Filo competed for the left guard position. He played in 11 games, starting the final nine including the playoffs at left guard. He struggled in pass protection during the season.

In 2016, Su’a-Filo appeared in 16 games with 15 starts. In 2017, the Texans used seven different offensive line starting combinations throughout the season. Only Suʻa-Filo and right tackle Breno Giacomini started every game at their respective positions.

=== Tennessee Titans ===
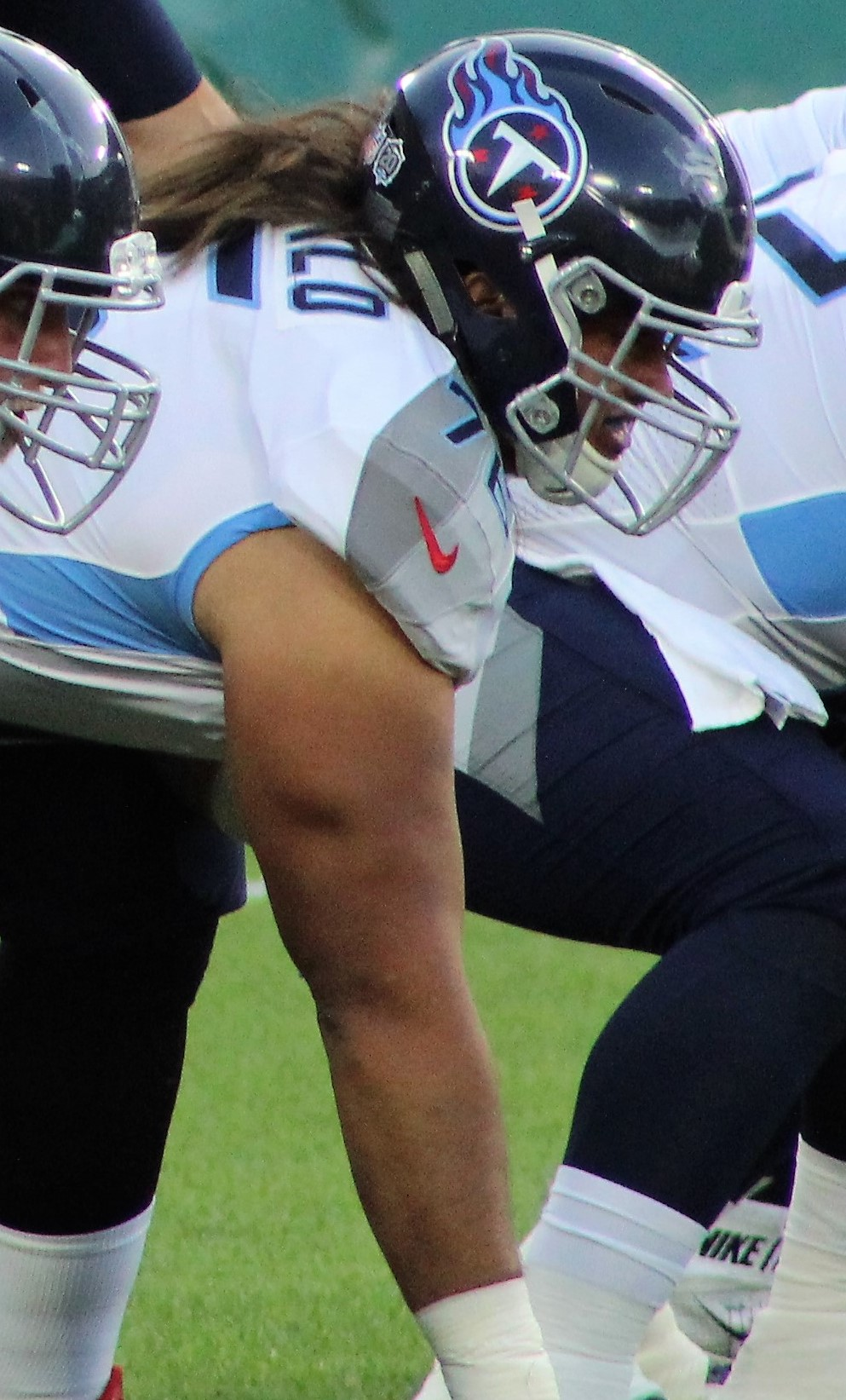
Suʻa-Filo with the Tennessee Titans in 2018

On March 27, 2018, Suʻa-Filo signed with the Tennessee Titans, reuniting with Mike Vrabel who was both the linebackers coach and defensive coordinator with the Texans. He was brought in to compete with starter Quinton Spain at left guard. Su’a-Filo was released by the Titans on September 1.

=== Dallas Cowboys ===
On September 11, 2018, Suʻa-Filo was signed by the Dallas Cowboys to replace backup guard Kadeem Edwards and provide depth in place of an injured Parker Ehinger. He replaced injured rookie Connor Williams, as the starter at left guard in the ninth game against the Philadelphia Eagles. His performance helped to stabilize the offensive line.

In 2019, he was a backup until Williams tore his right knee ACL in the Week 13 game against the Buffalo Bills. He started four games at left guard before suffering a high ankle sprain and a fractured fibula in the Week 16 game against the Philadelphia Eagles. He was placed on injured reserve on December 24.

=== Cincinnati Bengals ===
On March 19, 2020, Suʻa-Filo signed a three-year, $10 million contract with the Cincinnati Bengals. He was placed on the active/physically unable to perform list at the start of training camp on August 3, and activated from the list five days later. He was named the starting right guard in Week 1, but suffered an ankle injury and was placed on injured reserve on September 15. Su’a-Filo was activated on December 2. He appeared in six games with five starts at left guard.

Suʻa-Filo entered the 2021 season as the Bengals starting right guard. He suffered a knee injury in Week 2 and was placed on injured reserve on October 9, 2021. Su’a-Filo was activated on January 17, 2022, then released the next day and re-signed to the practice squad. His contract expired when the teams season ended on February 13, 2022.

== Coaching career ==
On January 14, 2026, Su’a-Filo was hired to serve as the offensive line coach for the Dallas Renegades of the United Football League.

== Personal life ==
Suʻa-Filo is fluent in Spanish, learning the language on his two-year church mission for the Church of Jesus Christ of Latter-Day Saints in Alabama and Florida. Suʻa-Filo has three siblings: Hayley, Natasha, and Wilson. He majored in history with a minor in Spanish at UCLA.
