= Datone Jones =

American gridiron football player (born 1990)

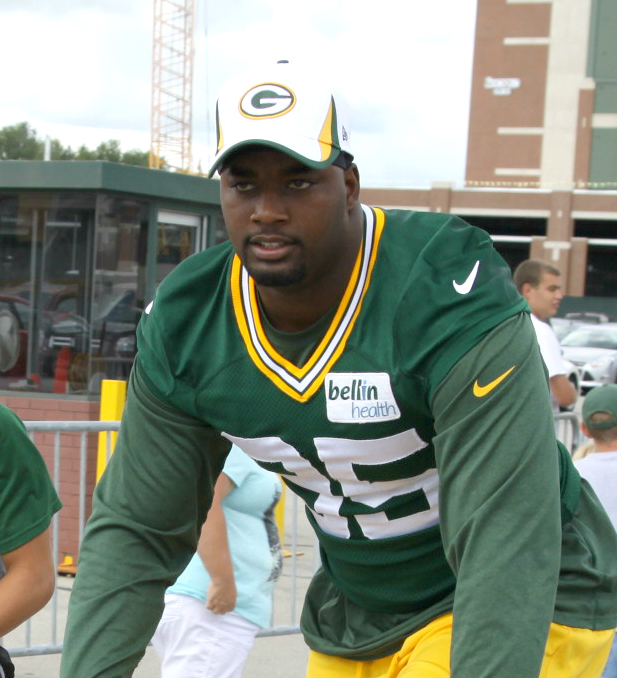
- Jones with the Green Bay Packers in 2013

No. 95, 56, 96
- Position: Defensive tackle

Personal information
- Born: July 24, 1990 (age 36); Los Angeles, California, U.S.
- Listed height: 6 ft 4 in (1.93 m)
- Listed weight: 285 lb (129 kg)

Career information
- High school: Compton (Compton, California)
- College: UCLA (2008–2012)
- NFL draft: 2013: 1st round, 26th overall pick

Career history
- Green Bay Packers (2013–2016); Minnesota Vikings (2017)*; Detroit Lions (2017); San Francisco 49ers (2017); Dallas Cowboys (2017–2018); Jacksonville Jaguars (2019)*; Las Vegas Raiders (2020); Montreal Alouettes (2021)*
- * Offseason or practice squad member only

Awards and highlights
- Second-team All-Pac-12 (2012); Rivals.com All-Pac-10 Freshman team (2008)

Career NFL statistics
- Total tackles: 89
- Sacks: 10
- Fumble recoveries: 1
- Interceptions: 1
- Pass deflections: 8
- Stats at Pro Football Reference

Datone Wayne Jones (born July 24, 1990) is an American former professional football player who was a defensive tackle in the National Football League (NFL). He played college football for the UCLA Bruins from 2008 to 2012 as a defensive end and defensive tackle. In 2008, he was named to the Rivals.com All-Pac-10 freshman team. In 2009, he earned sophomore All-America honorable mention honors from College Football News after finishing the season with 4 sacks and 11 tackles. He missed the entire 2010 season after suffering an injury to his right foot during fall camp. In 2012, he was named second-team All-Pac-12.

Jones was selected by the Green Bay Packers in the first round of the 2013 NFL draft. In his first season, he was one of four rookies to appear in all 16 games. At the end of the 2014 season, he became the first defensive player in Packers history to register a blocked field goal and a fumble recovery in a playoff game. He was converted to outside linebacker during the 2015 season, and continued to play the position in the 2016 season. In 2017, Jones left the Packers to play with the Minnesota Vikings, but was released on September 8, 2017, after being on injured reserve with a shoulder injury. He was also later a member of the Detroit Lions, San Francisco 49ers, Dallas Cowboys, Jacksonville Jaguars, Las Vegas Raiders and Montreal Alouettes.

== Early life ==
Jones was born in Los Angeles, California. He attended Compton High School in Compton, California, where he played as a defensive end for the Compton Tarbabes football team. During his junior year in 2006, he had 60 tackles and 4 sacks. As a senior, he had 91 tackles, 7 sacks, 2 fumble recoveries, 9 hurries, and 3 pass deflections. He was named second-team all-state by Cal-Hi sports. Furthermore, he was named Moore League co-defensive player of the year.

Jones played basketball in middle school and high school as a point guard. During his freshman year in 2004, he dreamed of being a basketball standout. On the weekends, he played with the likes of James Harden and DeMar DeRozan. He quit basketball his junior year to focus on football, but he lettered all four years in track and field.

During the spring, Jones ran the 100-, 200-, and 400-meter sprints at Compton. His best time in the 200 meters was 22.47 seconds as a sophomore. As a junior, at 240 pounds, he ran a personal-best time of 56.69 seconds in the 400 metres at a track meet in Long Beach. During his senior year, he participated in the men's shot put, the 100-meter, and the 200-meter.

Jones was highly recruited coming out of high school and was given a four-star prospect ranking by both Rivals.com and Scout.com. He ran the 40-yard dash in 4.8 seconds. Scouts said that he had good explosion, pass rushing skills, and quickness off the ball, but also expressed concern about his techniques and moves. "I go low, fast and hard. That's my strength," Jones said. "Every coach I talk with says how much they love how I fly around sideline-to-sideline and hit. I think quarterbacks are afraid of me and I'm really hard to block because I have such a fast get off". He had an overall GPA of 3.0 and an 810 on the SAT. He received scholarship offers from UCLA, Arizona State, Colorado, Notre Dame, Oregon, Arizona, Nebraska, and USC. Jones ultimately decided to attend UCLA.

College recruiting
Name	Hometown	School	Height	Weight	40^{‡}	Commit date
Datone Jones; DE	Compton, California	Compton High School	6 ft 4 in (1.93 m)	240–275 lb (109–125 kg)	4.8	Mar 10, 2007
Datone Jones; DE	Recruit ratings: Scout: Rivals: 247Sports:					
Overall recruit ranking: Scout: 10 (DE) Rivals: 8 (DE), 16 (California), 125 National
‡ Refers to 40-yard dash; Note: In many cases, Scout, Rivals, 247Sports, On3, and ESPN may conflict in their listings of height, weight and 40 time.; In these cases, the average was taken. ESPN grades are on a 100-point scale.; Sources: "2008 UCLA Football Commitment List". Rivals.; "2008 UCLA College Football Recruiting Commits". Scout.; "Scout.com Team Recruiting Rankings". Scout.; "2008 Team Ranking". Rivals.com.; "Datone Jones". 247Sports.

== College career ==
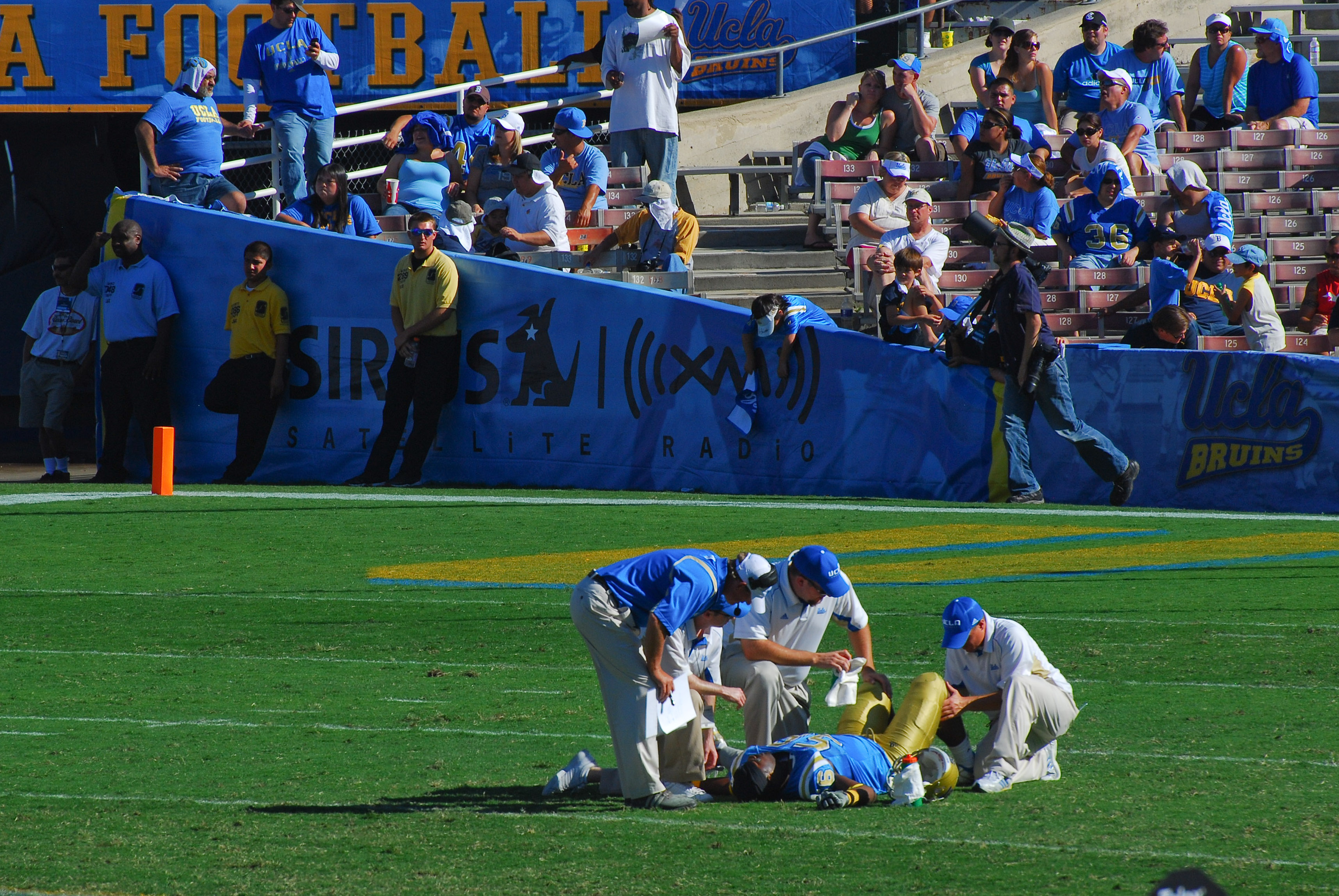
Jones injured during a UCLA game in 2009

In UCLA, Jones played defensive end and defensive tackle for the UCLA Bruins football team from 2008 to 2012. He finished his tenure with 43 starts (including his final 28 straight games), 148 tackles (90 solo), 36.5 tackles for loss, 12.5 sacks, 5 passes defensed, 4 forced fumbles, and 1 fumble recovery.

Jones participated in 10 games with 2 starts in his freshman season with the team. He started his first game against California, where he had a season-high 6 tackles (4 solo). He finished the year with 15 tackles and was named to the Rivals.com All-Pac-10 Freshman team. In his sophomore season, he started in all 13 games. During the season opener against San Diego State, he defensed 2 passes, a career high. On October 3, against Stanford, he had 3 tackles and sacked future NFL quarterback Andrew Luck, forcing a fumble, which he also recovered. He finished the season with 4 sacks and 11 tackles for a loss, which earned him Sophomore All-America honorable mention honors from College Football News.

In 2010, Jones missed the entire season due to a fractured right foot he suffered in fall camp. Returning from the injury the next season, he again started every game for the team and was named to the watch list for the Ted Hendricks Award, given annually to the best defensive linemen in college football. During a game against California, he had a career-best 2 sacks. He led the Bruins with 41 tackles, while also topping the team with 6.5 tackles for loss and 3.0 sacks.

Jones continued to be the starter during his final year with the team and was named to the Chuck Bednarik Award watch list; the award is given annually to the best defensive player in college football. In the first game against Rice, he had 6 tackles and 2 sacks, matching his career-high. During a game against the Nebraska Cornhuskers, he had a career-best 3 tackles for loss and was given credit for forcing a safety. He matched his career-high with 3 tackles for a loss and caught a 7-yard touchdown pass in the third game against Houston. When the Bruins faced California, he had 5 tackles (4 solo), 1 sack, and blocked an extra point. At the end of the year, he was selected to be second-team All-Conference by the Pac-12 coaches. He was also selected to play in the 2013 All-Star Senior Bowl.

== Professional career ==
=== Pre-draft ===
Jones was projected to be a late first-round or early second-round pick in the NFL draft. Scouts observed that he was a sturdy athlete with a good initial explosion off the ball and good use of his hands. However, he was also said to lack the constant speed or flexibility to be a 4-3 defensive end.

External videos
- Jones's NFL Combine workout
- Jones gets drafted by Green Bay

Pre-draft measurables
Height	Weight	Arm length	Hand span	40-yard dash	10-yard split	20-yard split	20-yard shuttle	Three-cone drill	Vertical jump	Broad jump	Bench press	Wonderlic
6 ft 3 7/8 in (1.93 m)	283 lb (128 kg)	32 3/4 in (0.83 m)	10 in (0.25 m)	4.80 s	1.66 s	2.76 s	4.32 s	7.32 s	31.5 in (0.80 m)	9 ft 4 in (2.84 m)	29 reps	20
All values are from NFL Combine

=== Green Bay Packers ===
==== 2013 season ====
Jones was selected in the first round (26th overall) by the Green Bay Packers in the 2013 NFL draft. He became the first UCLA defensive lineman taken in the first round since 1979 when Manu Tuiasosopo was selected 18th overall by the Seattle Seahawks. Additionally, he was the first UCLA player selected in the first round since Jacksonville Jaguars tight end Marcedes Lewis in 2006. After being drafted, Jones stated that he was motivated by Reggie White. He said that he watched numerous films about White.

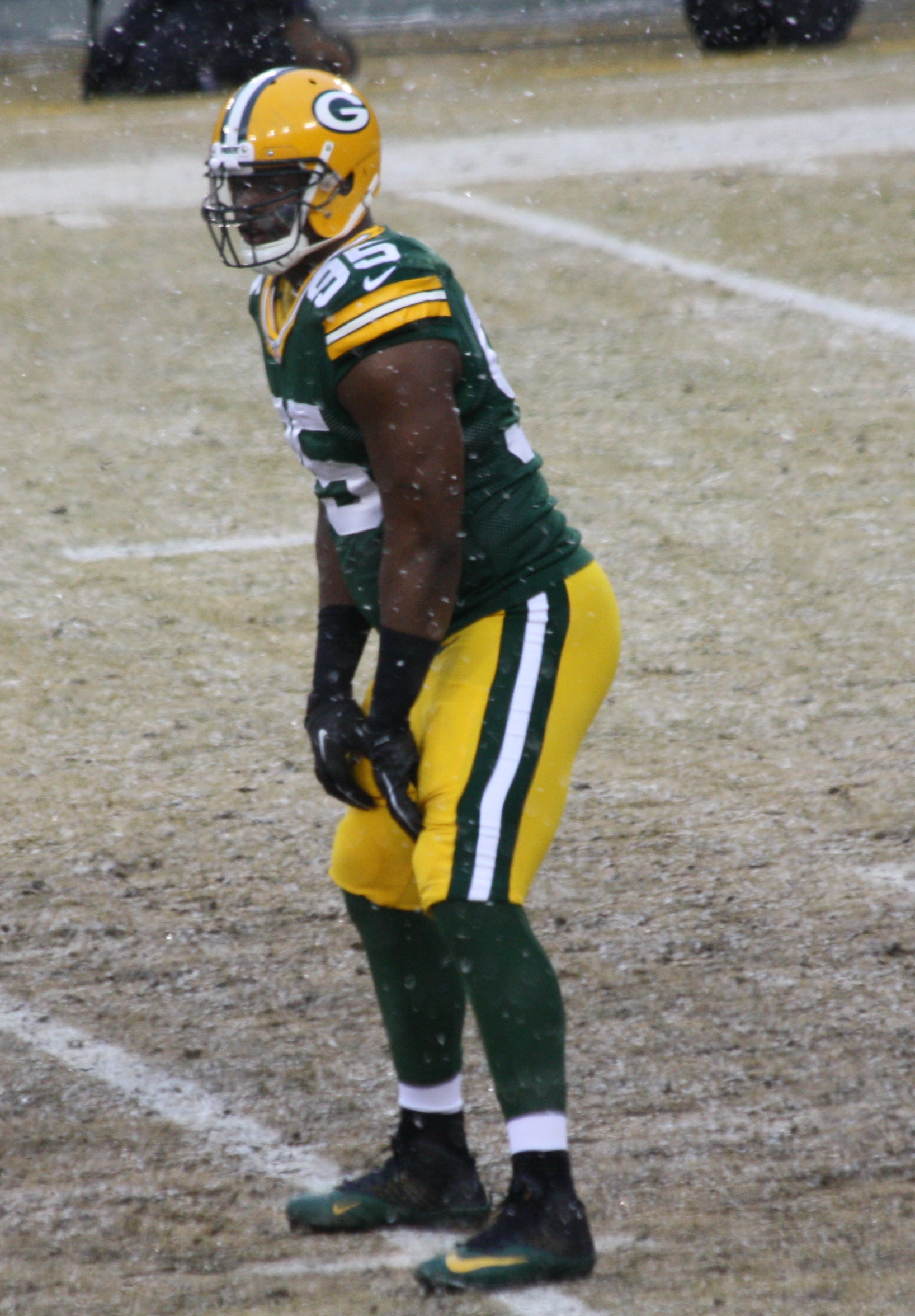
Jones lining up on defense against the Pittsburgh Steelers

Jones overcame an ankle injury suffered during the preseason and was healthy in time for the regular-season opening game; he did not miss any action during the year. He was one of four rookies to appear in all 16 games, rotated at defensive end, and was one of the interior rushers in the team's defensive formations. He finished the season with 10 tackles (7 solo), 3.5 sacks, and a fumble recovery, while also blocking an extra-point attempt.

==== 2014 season ====
In 2014, Jones played in 13 games, starting 3 of those games. He finished the regular season with 21 tackles, 1.5 sacks, an interception returned for 18 yards, 2 passes defensed, and a fumble recovery. In week 16 against the Tampa Bay Buccaneers, he had his first interception. During a postseason divisional round contest against the Dallas Cowboys, he became the first Packer to register a blocked field goal and a fumble recovery in a playoff game, helping the Packers advance to the conference championship game.

==== 2015 season ====
On July 2, 2015, the NFL announced that they would suspend Jones for one game for violating the league's substance abuse policy. According to a police report acquired by the Green Bay Press-Gazette, he was cited for marijuana a day after the Packers 28–22 overtime playoff loss against the Seahawks. He apologized for the suspension but did not appeal it, stating that there was "no reason to".

Jones played in 15 games during the regular season and appeared in both postseason contests. He posted 20 tackles (14 solo), 3 sacks, 3 passes defensed, and one kickoff return for 9 yards. He had 13 quarterback hits (good for second on the team), 12 quarterback pressures, and 3 passes defensed, which was the most among Packers defensive linemen. On October 11, 2015, he had three quarterback hits and a blocked field goal during the team's 24–10 victory against the St. Louis Rams, earning him the Milwaukee Journal Sentinel player of the week honor. On November 19, 2015, defensive coordinator Dom Capers announced that Jones would be converted to the outside linebacker position.

==== 2016 season ====
On March 22, 2016, head coach Mike McCarthy announced that Jones would continue playing outside linebacker and would line up as an edge rusher. On May 3, 2016, the Packers declined the fifth-year option, making him a free agent after the season unless he signed a new contract with the Packers. On November 4, 2016, he was fined $36,434 for roughing the passer in Week 8 against the Atlanta Falcons. On December 23, 2016, he was fined $9,115, this time for a facemask penalty. He played in 15 games in the regular season and appeared in all 3 postseason contests. He posted 31.5 pressures, 22 tackles (17 solo), 1 sack, and 2 passes defensed.

Jones recorded nine sacks in 59 games throughout his Packers career. Although he was functional as a rotational player, he was unable to develop into an effective pass rusher and live up to the expectations of a first-round draft pick. His performance in 2016— only one sack in 548 snaps—led to the Packers letting him become a free agent.

=== Minnesota Vikings ===
Jones was signed by the Minnesota Vikings to a one-year contract on March 14, 2017. He stated that the Packers were not interested in re-signing him, and that the Vikings suit him better. He was placed on injured reserve with a shoulder injury on September 2, 2017, but was released with an injury settlement six days later.

=== Detroit Lions ===
Jones signed with the Detroit Lions on October 11, 2017, after the Lions' defensive lineman Haloti Ngata suffered an elbow injury during a 24–27 loss against the Carolina Panthers. However, he was released a week later on October 18, 2017.

=== San Francisco 49ers ===
Jones signed a one-year deal with the San Francisco 49ers on October 24, 2017, to bolster the team's defensive line, which was plagued by injuries. He appeared in three games and made six tackles as a defensive end. However, he was waived on November 21 to make room for Tank Carradine.

=== Dallas Cowboys ===
Jones was signed by the Dallas Cowboys to a two-year contract on November 26, 2017. He appeared in four games as a backup defensive tackle, registering six tackles and one sack. In 2018, he missed the first two games of the regular season with a knee injury he suffered in the second preseason game against the Cincinnati Bengals. He only played in the third game against the Seattle Seahawks, where he took part in five special teams' snaps before suffering a hamstring injury. On September 25, 2018, he was placed on injured reserve for the rest of the season.

=== Jacksonville Jaguars ===
On June 4, 2019, Jones signed with the Jacksonville Jaguars. In the third preseason game, he registered six tackles during the team's 22–7 loss against the Miami Dolphins. He appeared in all four preseason games and registered 10 tackles, but was released on August 30, 2019, as part of the final roster cuts.

=== Las Vegas Raiders ===
Jones signed with the Las Vegas Raiders on August 14, 2020. He was released on September 5, 2020, and signed to the practice squad the next day. He was elevated to the active roster on October 10 for the team's week 5 game against the Kansas City Chiefs, and reverted to the practice squad after the game. He was released on November 23.

=== Montreal Alouettes ===
Jones signed with the Montreal Alouettes of the Canadian Football League (CFL) on January 21, 2021, and spent over two weeks in training camp. However, he was released by the team on July 27, 2021.

== Career statistics ==
=== NFL ===
Regular season statistics
Year	Team	G	Tackles					Interceptions						Fumbles	
Year	Team	G	Total	Solo	Ast	Sck	SFTY	PDef	Int	Yds	Avg	Lng	TDs	FF	FR
2013	GB	16	10	7	3	3.5	0	0	0	0	0.0	0	0	0	1
2014	GB	13	21	16	5	1.5	0	2	1	18	18.0	18	0	0	0
2015	GB	15	20	14	6	3.0	0	3	0	0	0.0	0	0	0	0
2016	GB	15	22	17	5	1.0	0	2	0	0	0.0	0	0	0	0
2017	DET	0	DNP												
2017	SF	3	6	3	3	0.0	0	0	0	0	0.0	0	0	0	0
2017	DAL	4	9	6	3	1.0	0	1	0	0	0.0	0	0	0	0
2018	DAL	1	0	0	0	0.0	0	0	0	0	0.0	0	0	0	0
Total		67	88	63	25	10.0	0	8	1	18	18.0	18	0	0	1
Source: NFL.com

Postseason statistics
Year	Team	G	Tackles					Interceptions						Fumbles	
Year	Team	G	Total	Solo	Ast	Sck	SFTY	PDef	Int	Yds	Avg	Lng	TDs	FF	FR
2013	GB	1	0	0	0	0.0	0	0	0	0	0.0	0	0	0	0
2014	GB	2	4	1	3	0.5	0	0	0	0	0.0	0	0	0	0
2015	GB	2	2	2	0	0.0	0	0	0	0	0.0	0	0	0	0
2016	GB	3	3	2	1	0.0	0	0	0	0	0.0	0	0	0	0
Total		8	9	5	4	0.5	0	0	0	0	0.0	0	0	0	0
Source: pro-football-reference.com

=== College ===
Season	Team	GP	GS	Tackles					Interceptions						Fumbles		
Season	Team	GP	GS	Comb	Total	Ast	Sck	Tfl	PDef	Int	Yds	Avg	Lng	TDs	FF	FR	FR YDS
2008	UCLA	10	2	15	10	5	0.0	0	0	0	0	0.0	0	0	0	0	0
2009	UCLA	13	13	30	12	18	4.0	11.0	3	0	0	0.0	0	0	2	1	0
2011	UCLA	14	14	41	23	18	3.0	6.5	2	0	0	0.0	0	0	0	0	0
2012	UCLA	14	14	62	45	17	5.5	19.0	0	0	0	0.0	0	0	0	0	0
Totals		51	43	148	90	58	12.5	36.5	5	0	0	0.0	0	0	2	1	0
Source: sports-reference.com

== Personal life ==
Jones was raised by his single mother in Compton, California, alongside his brother and four sisters. In 2015, Jones's wife gave birth to their first child. On May 14, 2017, Jones tweeted that he bought his mother a new house on Mother's Day. On February 26, 2019, Jones was baptized in a crowd that includes his wife and fellow NFL players.
