= Jeff Baca =

American football player (born 1990)

No. 60
- Position: Center

Personal information
- Born: January 10, 1990 (age 36); Laguna Hills, California, U.S.
- Listed height: 6 ft 3 in (1.91 m)
- Listed weight: 302 lb (137 kg)

Career information
- High school: Mission Viejo (Mission Viejo, California)
- College: UCLA (2008–2012)
- NFL draft: 2013: 6th round, 196th overall pick

Career history
- Minnesota Vikings (2013); Cincinnati Bengals (2014)*; Dallas Cowboys (2014)*; San Diego Chargers (2014)
- * Offseason or practice squad member only

Awards and highlights
- Second-team All-Pac-12 (2012)

Career NFL statistics
- Games played: 4
- Games started: 0
- Stats at Pro Football Reference

Jeffery James Baca (born January 10, 1990) is an American former professional football player who was a center in the National Football League (NFL). He was selected by the Minnesota Vikings in the sixth round of the 2013 NFL draft after playing college football at UCLA.

== Early life ==
Baca was born in Laguna Hills, California. He played high school football at Mission Viejo High School in Mission Viejo, California. He also participated in track and field in high school.

== College career ==
Baca played college football at UCLA from 2008 to 2012. He missed the 2010 season due to eligibility issues. He earned second-team All-Pac-12 honors his senior year in 2012. Baca made 45 career starts.

== Professional career ==
Pre-draft measurables
Height	Weight	40-yard dash	10-yard split	20-yard split	20-yard shuttle	Three-cone drill	Vertical jump	Broad jump	Bench press
6 ft 4 in (1.93 m)	302 lb (137 kg)	4.98 s	1.69 s	2.85 s	4.44 s	7.26 s	26.5 in (0.67 m)	8 ft 4 in (2.54 m)	28 reps
All values from NFL Combine

Baca was selected by the Minnesota Vikings in the sixth round of the 2013 NFL draft. He played in four games with the Vikings in 2013. He was waived on August 30, 2014.

Baca was signed to the practice squad of the Cincinnati Bengals on October 8, 2014. He was released on October 16, 2014.

Baca was signed to the practice squad of the Dallas Cowboys on October 30, 2014. He was released on November 18, 2014.

Baca was signed to the practice squad of the San Diego Chargers on November 26, 2014. He was promoted to the active roster on December 4, 2014. He was waived on December 8, 2014, and re-signed to the practice squad on December 10, 2014. Baca was promoted to the active roster for the second time on December 27, 2014. He was waived by the Chargers on March 31, 2015.
