= Johnathan Franklin =

American football player (born 1989)

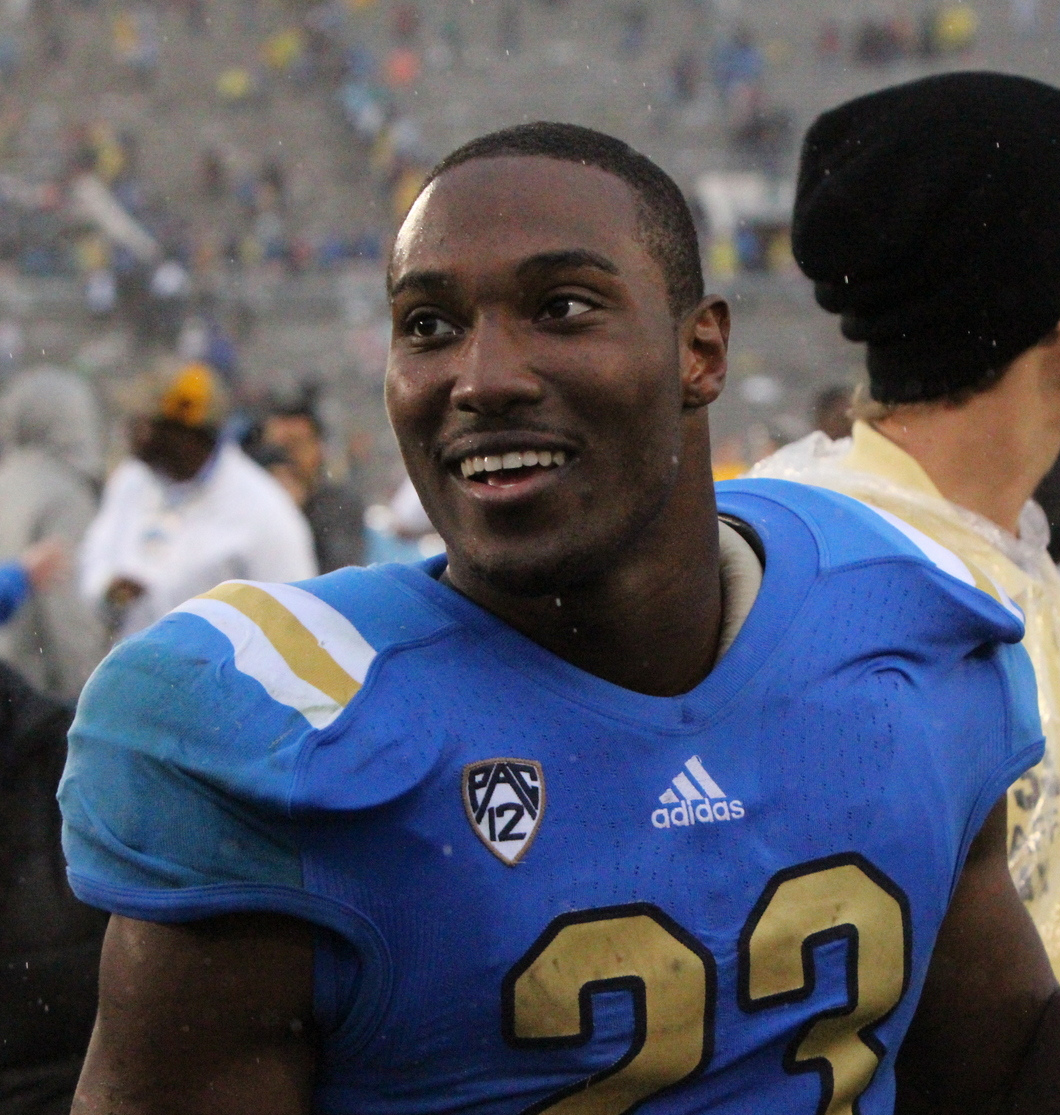
- Franklin with the UCLA Bruins in 2012

No. 23
- Position: Running back

Personal information
- Born: October 23, 1989 (age 37); Los Angeles, California, U.S.
- Listed height: 5 ft 10 in (1.78 m)
- Listed weight: 205 lb (93 kg)

Career information
- High school: Susan Miller Dorsey (Los Angeles)
- College: UCLA (2008–2012)
- NFL draft: 2013: 4th round, 125th overall pick

Career history
- Green Bay Packers (2013)

Awards and highlights
- First-team All-American (2012); 2× Second-team All-Pac-12 (2010, 2012)

Career NFL statistics
- Rushing attempts: 19
- Rushing yards: 107
- Rushing touchdowns: 1
- Receptions: 4
- Receiving yards: 30
- Stats at Pro Football Reference

Johnathan A. Franklin (born October 23, 1989) is an American former professional football player who was a running back for one season with the Green Bay Packers in the National Football League (NFL). He played college football for the UCLA Bruins, earning first-team All-American honors while setting a school record for career yards rushing. Franklin was selected by the Packers in the fourth round of the 2013 NFL draft. After suffering a serious neck injury in his rookie season with Green Bay, he announced his retirement from the NFL in 2014.

== Early life ==
Franklin graduated from Susan Miller Dorsey High School of the Los Angeles Unified School District. As a high school football player, Franklin was named first-team all-city as a running back and was a third-team selection as a cornerback. He was also named Coliseum League Player of the Year.

In addition to football, he also ran track and field. He ran a personal best time of 11.01 seconds in the 100 meters.

He was also a cast member of the reality television series Baldwin Hills.

== College career ==
Franklin received an athletic scholarship to attend the University of California, Los Angeles, where he played for the UCLA Bruins football team from 2009 to 2012. During the 2010 season, Franklin had a career-high of 30 carries for 216 yards in a game against Washington State. He scored three touchdowns against Houston. Franklin averaged 5.4 yards per carry for a total 1127 yards 8 touchdowns during 2010. His longest rushing attempt was 55 yards.

Franklin had 976 yards on the ground and 74 receiving yards in the Bruins' Pac-12 South Division Championship year. In the 2012 season opener against Rice, Franklin ran for 214 yards on 15 carries and three touchdowns. He was named Pac-12 Offensive Player of the Week on September 3, 2012. At the team's home opener win over No. 16 ranked Nebraska, Franklin rushed for 217 yards for an average of 8.3 yards per carry, which placed him at 7th place of the UCLA rushing record list. He was named Pac-12 Conference Offensive Player of the Week again and was the nation's leading rusher with an average of 215.5 yards per game.

On November 3, 2012, he surpassed Gaston Green's 3,731-yard career record at UCLA in a 66-10 victory against Arizona at the Rose Bowl on Homecoming Day. It was broken when he ran for 37 yards for the first touchdown of the game. Franklin was voted second best running back in the nation in the Doak Walker Award, finishing just behind Montee Ball of Wisconsin.

During the 2012 season, Franklin played in 13 games and rushed 268 times for 1,734 yards for 13 touchdowns, averaging 133.4 yards per game. His longest run was 78 yards and he had 2058 all purpose yards for an average of 158.3 yards per game, enough to lead the Bruins to the Pac-12 South Division Championship. He finished his UCLA career with 4,403 yards rushing.

== Professional career ==
Pre-draft measurables
Height	Weight	Arm length	Hand span	40-yard dash	20-yard shuttle	Three-cone drill	Vertical jump	Broad jump	Bench press	Wonderlic
5 ft 10 in (1.78 m)	205 lb (93 kg)	30 in (0.76 m)	9 3/8 in (0.24 m)	4.49 s	4.31 s	6.89 s	31.5 in (0.80 m)	9 ft 7 in (2.92 m)	18 reps	21
All values from NFL Combine.

Franklin was selected by the Green Bay Packers in the fourth round, with the 125th overall pick, of the 2013 NFL draft.

In the Week 3 loss against the Cincinnati Bengals, Franklin rushed for 103 yards and scored a touchdown, but had a fumble that was returned for the game-winning touchdown. He suffered a severe neck injury in the Week 12 game against the Minnesota Vikings. He was put on injured reserve on November 27, 2013. On June 19, 2014, Packers Head coach, Mike McCarthy announced that Franklin would not return with the Packers for the 2014 season. That same day Franklin announced his retirement from football. Doctors told him that one hit could paralyze him from the neck down. The Packers officially released him the following day. In his only season in the NFL, Franklin played a total of eleven games.

== Post-playing career ==
After Franklin announced his retirement from professional football, he began an internship in the front offices of the Packer organization. He then worked within sales and business development, as well as community outreach and the media department. “I love this game of football. It hurts and it bothers me, but I know God has something better for me,” Franklin has said about transitioning from a football player to a businessman.

In December 2014, Franklin was hired by the University of Notre Dame as an administrator for student welfare and development. He developed community outreach programs and workshops for the school's student-athletes. Franklin also led the student-athlete Bible study.

Since 2017, Franklin has worked for the Los Angeles Rams in Community and External Relations.

== Career statistics ==
=== NFL ===
Year	Team	Games		Rushing						Receiving				
Year	Team	GP	GS	Att	Yds	Avg	Y/G	Lng	TD	Rec	Yds	Avg	Lng	TD
2012	Green Bay	11	0	19	107	5.6	9.7	51	1	4	30	7.5	10	0

=== College ===
			Rushing						Receiving					
Season	Team	GP	Att	Yards	Yds/Att	Long	TD	Yds/G	Rec	Yards	Yds/Rec	Long	TD	Yds/G
2009	UCLA	13	126	566	4.5	74	5	43.5	6	57	9.5	15	0	4.4
2010	UCLA	12	214	1,127	5.3	59	8	93.9	10	63	6.3	18	0	5.3
2011	UCLA	14	166	976	5.9	40	5	69.7	9	74	8.2	24	1	5.3
2012	UCLA	13	269	1,734	6.1	78	13	130.8	32	319	10.0	40	2	24.5
Career		52	774	4,403	5.7	78	31	84.0	57	513	9.0	40	3	9.9
