= 2012 Arizona Wildcats football team =

American college football season

2012 Arizona Wildcats football

New Mexico Bowl champion

New Mexico Bowl, W 49–48 vs. Nevada
- Conference: Pac-12 Conference
- South Division
- Record: 8–5 (4–5 Pac-12)
- Head coach: Rich Rodriguez (1st season)
- Co-offensive coordinators: Calvin Magee (1st season); Rod Smith (1st season)
- Offensive scheme: Spread option
- Defensive coordinator: Jeff Casteel (1st season)
- Base defense: 3–3–5
- Home stadium: Arizona Stadium

2012 Pac-12 Conference football standings
	Conf.			Overall
Team	W		L	W		L
North Division
No. 7 Stanford xy$	8	–	1	12	–	2
No. 2 Oregon x%	8	–	1	12	–	1
No. 20 Oregon State	6	–	3	9	–	4
Washington	5	–	4	7	–	6
California	2	–	7	3	–	9
Washington State	1	–	8	3	–	9
South Division
UCLA xy	6	–	3	9	–	5
Arizona State	5	–	4	8	–	5
USC	5	–	4	7	–	6
Arizona	4	–	5	8	–	5
Utah	3	–	6	5	–	7
Colorado	1	–	8	1	–	11
Championship: Stanford 27, UCLA 24
$ – BCS representative as conference champion; % – BCS at-large representative; x – Division champion/co-champions; y – Championship game participant; Rankings from AP Poll

The 2012 Arizona Wildcats football team represented the University of Arizona in the 2012 NCAA Division I FBS football season. The Wildcats played at Arizona Stadium in Tucson for the 84th straight year. The 2012 season was Arizona's second in the South Division of the Pac-12 Conference and the first for head coach Rich Rodriguez.

== Preseason ==
=== Incoming recruiting class and transfers ===
High School Recruits

- DB Jamar Allah/6-1/190/Phoenix, AZ (North Canyon HS)
- QB Javelle Allen/6-2/204/Prosper, Texas (Prosper HS)
- WR Jarrell Bennett/5-10/160/New Orleans, La. (Edna Karr HS)
- OL Beau Boyster/6-4/275/Bellflower, Calif. (St. John Bosco HS)
- OL Cayman Bundage/6-2/285/Oklahoma City (Douglass HS)
- TE Keoni Bush-Loo/6-4/240/Honolulu (Kamehameha School)
- WR Wayne Capers Jr./6-1/205/Bridgeville, Pa. (Chartiers Valley HS)
- LB Dakota Conwell/6-2/205/Pittsburgh, Pa. (Upper Saint Clair HS)
- LB C.J. Dozier/6-2/210/Temecula, Calif. (Chaparral HS)
- WR Clive Georges/6-1/160/Key West, Fla. (Key West HS)
- WR Trey Griffey/6-2/190/Orlando, Fla. (Dr. Phillips HS)
- OL T.D. Gross/6-6/255/Santee, Calif. (Santana HS)
- ATH Bryan Harper/6-0/180/Ontario, Calif. (Colony HS)
- OL Zach Hemmila/6-3/275/Chandler (Chandler HS)
- LB Cody Ippolito/6-0/210/Scottsdale, AZ (Chaparral HS)
- DE Kyle Kelley/6-3/230/Irvine, Calif. (Woodbridge HS)
- QB Josh Kern/6-5/190/San Antonio, Texas (Tom Clark HS)
- RB Anthony Lopez/5-10/185/Gilbert (Mesquite HS)
- DT Dwight Melvin/6-1/265/Laveen (Betty H. Fairfax HS)
- CB William Parks/6-0/175/Philadelphia, Pa. (Germantown HS)
- S Yamen Sanders/6-4/190/Culver City, Calif. (Culver City HS)
- S Leo Thomas/6-3/180/San Antonio, Texas (Houston HS)
- RB J.T. Washington/5-7/165/Satellite Beach, Fla. (Satellite HS)
- RB Lucas Petrullo/6-0/200/Scottsdale, AZ (Chaparral HS)
- QB Jack Nykaza/6-1/190/Wilmette, Ill. (New Trier HS)
- S Clint Cochrane/6-0/180/Tucson, Ariz. (Canyon del Oro HS)
- LB Shadow Williams/6-0/218/Tampa, Fla. (Land O' Lakes HS)

Junior College Transfers

- QB Alex Cappellini/6-3/189/Phoenix, Ariz. (Orange Coast College)
- QB B.J. Denker/6-3/195/Cerritos, California (Cerritos Junior College)

Division I Transfers

- QB Nick Isham/5-10/185/Hidden Hills, Calif. (Louisiana Tech)

=== Spring Game ===
Arizona held its spring Red and Blue game on April 14 at Kino Stadium in Tucson. The team's offense gained 597 yards over 98 plays, scoring 10 touchdowns. 445 yards and 6 touchdowns came through the air.

== Schedule ==
Date	Time	Opponent	Rank	Site	TV	Result	Attendance
September 1	7:30 p.m.	Toledo*		Arizona Stadium; Tucson, AZ	ESPNU	W 24–17 ^{OT}	48,670
September 8	7:30 p.m.	No. 18 Oklahoma State*		Arizona Stadium; Tucson, AZ	P12N	W 59–38	45,602
September 15	7:30 p.m.	South Carolina State*	No. 24	Arizona Stadium; Tucson, AZ	P12N	W 56–0	43,919
September 22	7:30 p.m.	at No. 3 Oregon	No. 22	Autzen Stadium; Eugene, OR	ESPN	L 0–49	58,334
September 29	7:00 p.m.	No. 18 Oregon State		Arizona Stadium; Tucson, AZ	P12N	L 35–38	44,153
October 6	Noon	at No. 18 Stanford		Stanford Stadium; Stanford, CA	FOX	L 48–54 ^{OT}	48,204
October 20	7:00 p.m.	Washington		Arizona Stadium; Tucson, AZ	P12N	W 52–17	50,148
October 27	12:30 p.m.	No. 10 USC		Arizona Stadium; Tucson, AZ	ABC	W 39–36	47,822
November 3	7:30 p.m.	at No. 25 UCLA	No. 24	Rose Bowl; Pasadena, CA	P12N	L 10–66	81,673
November 10	11:30 a.m.	Colorado^{†}		Arizona Stadium; Tucson, AZ	FOX	W 56–31	51,236
November 17	8:00 p.m.	at Utah		Rice-Eccles Stadium; Salt Lake City, UT	ESPNU	W 34–24	45,031
November 23	8:00 p.m.	Arizona State		Arizona Stadium; Tucson, AZ (Territorial Cup/Duel in the Desert)	ESPN	L 34–41	51,901
December 15	11:00 a.m.	vs. Nevada*		University Stadium; Albuquerque, NM (New Mexico Bowl)	ESPN	W 49–48	24,610
*Non-conference game; ^{†}Homecoming; Rankings from AP Poll released prior to the game; All times are in Mountain time

Arizona plays eight of twelve regular season games at home: all three non-conference games and five of nine Pac-12 games. The Cats play neither Washington State nor California for the second straight season after the league's expansion to 12 teams.

== Roster ==
2012 Arizona Wildcats roster
2012 Arizona Wildcats roster from the University of Arizona Athletic Site
Quarterbacks: 7 B.J. Denker – Junior; 9 Javelle Allen – Freshman; 10 Matt Scott – Senior; 12 Nick Isham – Sophomore/TR; 13 Jack Nykaza – Freshman; 17 Josh Kern – Freshman; 19 Alex Cappellini – Sophomore/TR; Running backs: 2 Kylan Butler – Junior; 3 Daniel Jenkins – Junior; 23 Jared Baker – (redshirt) Freshman; 25 Ka'Deem Carey – Sophomore; 27 Terris Jones – Junior; 32 J.T. Washington – Freshman; 45 Elliot Taylor – Junior; Wide receivers: 4 Dan Buckner -Senior; 5 Trey Griffey – Freshman; 8 Richard Morrison – Junior; 11 Tyler Slavin – Sophomore; 15 Jarrell Bennett – Freshman; 16 Garic Wharton – Sophomore; 20 Trevor Ermisch – Sophomore; 29 Austin Hill – Sophomore; 30 Johnny Jackson – (redshirt) Freshman; 80 David Richards (redshirt) Freshman; 81 Clive Georges – Freshman; 82 Ademola Adeniran – Sophomore; 84 Sean Willet – Junior; 89 R.J. Aguero – Freshman	Tight ends: 18 Terrence Miller – Senior; 37 Ben Sullivan – (redshirt) Freshman; 83 Michael Cooper – Sophomore; 85 Dame Ndiaye – (redshirt) Freshman; 87 Drew Robinson -Senior; Fullback: 31 Taimi Tutogi – Senior; Offensive linemen: 54 Addison Bachman – Senior; 59 Beau Boyster – Freshman; 60 Carter Lees – Sophomore; 61 Cayman Bundage – Freshman; 62 Chris Putton – Junior; 65 Zach Hemmila – Freshman; 67 Jack Baucus – Junior; 68 Mickey Baucus – Sophomore; 69 Eric Bender-Ramsay – Junior; 70 T. D. Gross – Freshman; 72 Trace Biskin – Senior; 73 Fabbians Ebbele – Sophomore; 74 Jacob Arzouman – (redshirt) Freshman; 75 Shane Zink – Senior; 77 Lene Maiava – (redshirt) Freshman; 79 Trent Spurgeon – Sophomore; Centers: 76 Kyle Quinn – Senior; Long snapper: 49 Tim Johnston – Freshman; 50 Chase Gorham – Sophomore; 63 Brian Chacon – Senior	Defensive lines: 43 Justin Washington – Junior; 71 Chris Merrill – Senior; 75 Kirfi Taula – Sophomore; 84 Reggie Gilbert – Sophomore; 90 Dan Pettinato – Sophomore; 91 Sione Tuihalamaka – Junior; 92 Dominique Austin – Senior; 93 Lamar De Rego – Senior; 94 Christian Upshaw – Senior; 96 Willie Mobley – Senior; 97 Dwight Melvin – Freshman; 98 Tevin Hood – Junior/TR; 99 Kyle Kelley – Freshman; Linebackers: 2 Marquis Flowers – Junior; 9 C.J. Dozier – Freshman; 14 Keoni Bush-Loo – Freshman; 19 Hank Hobson – Sophomore; 24 Dakota Conwell – Freshman; 28 Anthony Lopez – Freshman; 33 Jake Fischer – Senior; 34 Aaron White – Freshman; 34 Greg Nwoko – Senior; 44 Rob Hankins – Sophomore; 47 Shadow Williams – Freshman; 53 Sir Thomas Jackson – Sophomore; 55 Vaughn Brinkman – "Freshman"; 56 Tyler Ermisch – Senior; 57 Cody Ippolito – Freshman; 58 Devin Gordon – (redshirt) Freshman	Cornerbacks: 1 Bryan Harper – Freshman; 5 Shaquille Richardson – Junior; 6 Johnathan McKnight – (redshirt) Sophomore; 17 Derrick Rainey – Junior; 26 Jourdon Grandon – Sophomore; 29 Justin Samuels – Junior; 40 Brendan Murphy – Junior/TR; 42 Shane Wilson – "Freshman"; Safeties: 4 Patrick Onwuasor – (redshirt) Freshman; 7 Mark Watley – Senior; 10 Yamen Sanders – Freshman; 11 William Parks – Freshman; 12 Wayne Capers Jr. – Freshman; 20 Stephen Ascher – Freshman; 21 Tra'Mayne Bondurant – Sophomore; 27 Jamar Allah – Freshman; 35 Clint Cochrane – Freshman; 36 Vince Miles – Freshman; 37 Keahi Hogan – Sophomore; 38 Jared Tevis – Junior; 46 Blake Brady – Sophomore; 51 Frasier Anderson – "Freshman"; Kickers/Punters: 13 Kyle Dugandzic – Senior; 15 John Bonano – Senior; 39 Drew Riggleman – Sophomore; 48 Jaime Salazar – Senior; 86 Jake Smith – Junior/TR

=== Depth chart ===
Defense

S
Tra'Mayne Bondurant (21)
Wayne Capers Jr. (12)
⋅

FS
Jourdon Grandon (26)
Vince Miles (36)
⋅

WLB	MLB	SLB
⋅	Jake Fischer (33)	⋅
C.J. Dozier (9)	Dakota Conwell (24)	⋅
⋅	⋅	⋅

BANDIT
Jared Tevis (38)
Patrick Onwuasor (4)
⋅

CB
Shaquille Richardson (5)
Derrick Rainey (17)
⋅

DE	NT	DE
Reggie Gilbert (84)	Sione Tuihalamaka (91)	Dan Pettinato (90)
Justin Washington (43)	Tevin Hood (98)	Willie Mobley (96)
⋅	⋅	⋅

CB
Jonathan McKnight (6)
Brendan Murphy (40)
⋅

Offense

WR
Dan Buckner (4)
Tyler Slavin (11)
⋅

WR
Austin Hill (29)
Richard Morrison (8)
⋅

LT	LG	C	RG	RT
Mickey Baucus (68)	Chris Putton (62)	Kyle Quinn (76)	Trace Biskin (72)	Fabbians Ebbele (73)
Chris Putton (62)	Cayman Bundage (61)	Addison Bachman (54)	Faitele Faafoi (64)	Shane Zink (75)
⋅	⋅	⋅	⋅	⋅

TE
Drew Robinson (87)
Michael Cooper (83)
⋅

WR
Terrance Miller (18)
David Richards (80)
⋅

QB
Matt Scott (10)
B.J. Denker (7)
Richard Morrison (8)

RB
Ka’Deem Carey (25)
Daniel Jenkins (3)
Jared Baker (23)

Special teams
PK John Bonano (15)
P Kyle Dugandzic (13)
KR Jared Baker (23)
PR Sean Willett (84)
LS Brian Chacon (63)

=== Returning starters ===
==== Offense ====
Player	Class	Position
Matt Scott	RS senior	Quarterback
Dan Buckner	RS senior	Wide receiver
Fabbians Ebbele	Redshirt Sophomore	Right tackle
Carter Lees	RS sophomore	Left guard
Trace Biskin	Senior	Right guard
Mickey Baucus	RS sophomore	Left tackle
Michael Cooper	Sophomore	Tight end

==== Defense ====
Player	Class	Position
Shaquille Richardson	Junior	Cornerback
Marquis Flowers	Junior	Safety
Reggie Gilbert	Sophomore	Defensive end
Dame Ndiaye	Sophomore	Defensive end
Rob Hankins	Sophomore	Linebacker

==== Special teams ====
Player	Class	Position
Jaime Salazar	Senior/JC	Punter
Kyle Dugandzic	Senior/JC	Punter
Jesse Ortiz	Redshirt Sophomore	Kicker
Ka'Deem Carey	Sophomore	Kickoff Return
John Bonano		Kicker

=== Departures ===
Position	Player	Notes
QB	Nick Foles	drafted to Philadelphia Eagles
LB	Rob Hankins	retired from a concussion injury
WR	Juron Criner	drafted to Oakland Raiders
CB	Trevin Wade	drafted to Cleveland Browns
QB	Bryson Beirne	graduated
RB	Keola Antolin	graduated
RB	David Hill	graduated
WR	David Roberts	graduated
WR	Gino Crump	graduated/undrafted to Arizona Cardinals
WR	David Douglas	graduated
WR	Sean Lieb	graduated
DL	C.J. Parish	graduated
DL	Mohammed Usman	graduated
DL	Lolomana Mikaele	graduated
LB	Derek Earls	graduated
LB	Bilal Muhammed	graduated
DB	Robert Golden	graduated
DB	Lyle Brown	graduated
DB	Trevor Foster	graduated
DB	Adam Gottschalk	graduated
LB	Joseph Perkins	graduated
K	Alex Zendejas	graduated

== Coaching staff ==
- Rich Rodriguez – Head coach
- Jeff Casteel- Defensive coordinator/LB's coach
- Calvin Magee – Associate head coach, Co-offensive coordinator, RB's
- Rod Smith – Co-offensive coordinator/QB's coach
- Robert Anae – Offensive line coach
- Tony Dews – Wide receivers coach
- Tony Gibson – Secondary/safeties coach; Defensive Special Teams
- Bill Kirelawich – Defensive line coach
- Spencer Leftwich – Tight ends coach; offensive special teams
- David Lockwood – Cornerbacks coach
- Chris Allen – Associate AD, strength and conditioning
- Mike Parrish – Director of operations
- Charlie Ragle – Assistant DFO
- Matt Dudek – On-campus recruiting
- Parker Whiteman – Director, skill development
- Frank Davis – Asst. strength coach
- Matt Caponi – Defensive graduate assistant
- Cory Zirbel – Offensive graduate assistant
- Billy Kirelawich – Operations coordinator

== Game summaries ==
=== vs Toledo ===
Toledo Rockets (0–0) vs Arizona Wildcats (0–0) – Game summary

Quarter	1	2	3	4	OT	Total
Rockets	0	14	0	3	0	17
Wildcats	3	7	7	0	7	24

at Arizona Stadium • Tucson, AZ

- Date: September 1, 2012
- Game time: 7:30 p.m.
- Game weather: Partly Cloudy, 93 °F (34 °C)
- Game attendance: 48,670
- Referee: Shawn Smith
- TV: ESPNU

Game information

First quarter

- (9:38) ARIZ – John Bonano 26-yard field goal (Drive: 12 plays, 71 yards, 3:01; Arizona 3–0)

Second quarter

- (13:55) TOL – Alonzo Russell 59-yard pass from Terrance Owens, Jeremiah Detmer kick (Drive: 10 plays, 94 yards, 4:31; Toledo 7–3)
- (12:04) ARIZ – Austin Hill 30-yard pass from Matt Scott, John Bonano kick (Drive: 6 plays, 75 yards, 1:51; Arizona 10–7)
- (6:01) TOL – David Fluellen 1-yard run, Jeremiah Detmer kick (Drive: 10 plays, 64 yards, 3:10; Toledo 14–10)

Third quarter

- (6:01) ARIZ – Ka'Deem Carey 73-yard run, John Bonano kick (Drive: 2 plays, 84 yards, 0:32; Arizona 17–14)

Fourth quarter

- (14:18) TOL – Jeremiah Detmer 40-yard field goal (Drive: 9 plays, 42 yards, 2:03; Tied 17–17)

Overtime

- ARIZ – Terrence Miller 10-yard pass from Matt Scott, John Bonano kick (Drive: 3 plays, 25 yards; Arizona 24–17)

Statistics	TOL	ARIZ
First downs	24	33
Total yards	358	624
Rushing yards	47–161	41–237
Passing yards	197	387
Passing: Comp–Att–Int	21–47–0	30–47–1
Time of possession	31:49	28:11

Team	Category	Player	Statistics
Toledo	Passing	Terrance Owens	11/22, 134 yards, TD
Toledo	Rushing	David Fluellen	20 carries, 72 yards, TD
Toledo	Receiving	Alonzo Russell	3 receptions, 71 yards, TD
Arizona	Passing	Matt Scott	30/46, 387 yards, 2 TD, INT
Arizona	Rushing	Ka'Deem Carey	20 carries, 147 yards, TD
Arizona	Receiving	Austin Hill	7 receptions, 139 yards, TD

=== vs No. 18 Oklahoma State ===
No. 18 Oklahoma State Cowboys (1–0) vs Arizona Wildcats (1–0) – Game summary

Quarter	1	2	3	4	Total
No. 18 Cowboys	14	0	17	7	38
Wildcats	10	13	14	22	59

at Arizona Stadium • Tucson, AZ

- Date: September 8, 2012
- Game time: 7:30 p.m.
- Game weather: Humid and Gusty, 80 °F (27 °C)
- Game attendance: 45,602
- Referee: Shawn Hochuli
- TV: Pac-12 Network

Game information

First quarter

- (13:03) OKST – Tracy Moore 9-yard pass from Wes Lunt, Quinn Sharp kick (Drive: 8 plays, 61 yards, 1:57; Oklahoma State 7–0)
- (7:50) OKST – Tracy Moore 30-yard pass from Wes Lunt, Quinn Sharp kick (Drive: 7 plays, 64 yards, 2:26; Oklahoma State 14–0)
- (5:19) ARIZ – Richard Morrison 15-yard pass from Matt Scott, John Bonano kick (Drive: 7 plays, 75 yards, 2:31; Oklahoma State 14–7)
- (3:00) ARIZ - John Bonano 22-yard field goal (Drive: 6 plays, 25 yards, 1:43; Oklahoma State 14-10)

Second quarter

- (14:18) ARIZ - John Bonano 46-yard field goal (Drive: 5 plays, 9 yards, 1:57; Oklahoma State 14-13)
- (11:46) ARIZ - John Bonano 24-yard field goal (Drive: 7 plays, 66 yards, 1:43; Arizona 16-14)
- (3:22) ARIZ – Ka'Deem Carey 1-yard run, John Bonano kick (Drive: 10 plays, 66 yards, 2:51; Arizona 23–14)

Third quarter

- (9:59) ARIZ – Ka'Deem Carey 13-yard pass from Matt Scott, John Bonano kick (Drive: 13 plays, 75 yards, 5:01; Arizona 30–14)
- (7:47) OKST – Tracy Moore 9-yard pass from Wes Lunt, Quinn Sharp kick (Drive: 9 plays, 75 yards, 2:12; Arizona 30–21)
- (4:54) OKST – Jeremy Smith 10-yard run, Quinn Sharp kick (Drive: 7 plays, 81 yards, 1:34; Arizona 30–28)
- (3:16) ARIZ – Matt Scott 8-yard run, John Bonano kick (Drive: 5 plays, 75 yards, 1:38; Arizona 37–28)
- (0:06) OKST - Quinn Sharp 25-yard field goal (Drive: 9 plays, 75 yards, 3:04; Arizona 37-31)

Fourth quarter

- (10:24) ARIZ – Jonathan McKnight 48-yard interception return, Matt Scott two-point pass to Taimi Tutogi (Arizona 45–31)
- (4:35) ARIZ – Ka'Deem Carey 25-yard run, John Bonano kick (Drive: 3 plays, 33 yards, 1:34; Arizona 52–31)
- (2:58) OKST – Tracy Moore 22-yard pass from Wes Lunt, Quinn Sharp kick (Drive: 7 plays, 73 yards, 1:32; Arizona 52–38)
- (1:57) ARIZ – Ka'Deem Carey 1-yard run, John Bonano kick (Drive: 5 plays, 44 yards, 0:59; Arizona 59–38)

Statistics	OKST	ARIZ
First downs	30	32
Total yards	636	501
Rushing yards	32–200	49–181
Passing yards	436	320
Passing: Comp–Att–Int	37–60–3	28–41–0
Time of possession	27:56	32:04

Team	Category	Player	Statistics
Oklahoma State	Passing	Wes Lunt	37/60, 436 yards, 4 TD, 3 INT
Oklahoma State	Rushing	Joseph Randle	23 carries, 123 yards
Oklahoma State	Receiving	Tracy Moore	8 receptions, 106 yards, 4 TD
Arizona	Passing	Matt Scott	28/41, 320 yards, 2 TD
Arizona	Rushing	Ka'Deem Carey	26 carries, 126 yards, 3 TD
Arizona	Receiving	Austin Hill	5 receptions, 124 yards

Arizona's first ever televised football game on the Pac-12 Network.

=== vs South Carolina State ===
South Carolina State Bulldogs (1–1) vs No. 24 Arizona Wildcats (2–0) – Game summary

Quarter	1	2	3	4	Total
Bulldogs	0	0	0	0	0
No. 24 Wildcats	7	21	14	14	56

at Arizona Stadium • Tucson, AZ

- Date: September 15, 2012
- Game time: 7:30 p.m.
- Game weather: Clear, 83 °F (28 °C)
- Game attendance: 43,919
- TV: Pac-12 Network

Game information

First quarter

- (12:01) ARIZ – Richard Morrison 15-yard pass from Matt Scott, John Bonano kick (Drive: 9 plays, 75 yards, 2:59; Arizona 7–0)

Second quarter

- (12:36) ARIZ – Taimi Tutogi 14-yard pass from Matt Scott, John Bonano kick (Drive: 7 plays, 53 yards, 2:16; Arizona 14–0)
- (7:13) ARIZ – Ka'Deem Carey 7-yard run, John Bonano kick (Drive: 12 plays, 72 yards, 3:41; Arizona 21–0)
- (1:40) ARIZ – Matt Scott 10-yard run, John Bonano kick (Drive: 6 plays, 39 yards, 2:01; Arizona 28–0)

Third quarter

- (9:37) ARIZ – Dan Buckner 27-yard pass from Matt Scott, John Bonano kick (Drive: 6 plays, 81 yards, 2:14; Arizona 35–0)
- (1:46) ARIZ – Daniel Jenkins 5-yard run, John Bonano kick (Drive: 10 plays, 80 yards, 4:41; Arizona 42–0)

Fourth quarter

- (10:42) ARIZ – Sean Willet 17-yard pass from B.J. Denker, John Bonano kick (Drive: 14 plays, 87 yards, 4:07; Arizona 49–0)
- (5:58) ARIZ – Jared Baker 4-yard run, John Bonano kick (Drive: 8 plays, 72 yards, 3:06; Arizona 56–0)

Statistics	SCST	ARIZ
First downs	8	43
Total yards	154	689
Rushing yards	29–65	56–323
Passing yards	89	366
Passing: Comp–Att–Int	12–25–1	36–46–0
Time of possession	24:58	35:02

Team	Category	Player	Statistics
South Carolina State	Passing	Richard Cue	12/25, 89 yards, INT
South Carolina State	Rushing	Julius Pendergrass	9 carries, 24 yards
South Carolina State	Receiving	Tyler McDonald	4 receptions, 47 yards
Arizona	Passing	Matt Scott	30/36, 288 yards, 3 TD
Arizona	Rushing	Daniel Jenkins	12 carries, 76 yards, TD
Arizona	Receiving	Dan Buckner	6 receptions, 85 yards, TD

=== at #3 Oregon ===
No. 22 Arizona Wildcats (3–0) at No. 3 Oregon Ducks (3–0) – Game summary

Quarter	1	2	3	4	Total
#22 Wildcats	0	0	0	0	0
#3 Ducks	7	6	15	21	49

at Autzen Stadium • Eugene, OR

- Date: September 22, 2012
- Game time: 7:30 p.m.
- Game weather: Mostly Cloudy, 65 °F (18 °C)
- Game attendance: 58,334
- Referee: Land Clark
- TV: ESPN

Game information

First quarter

- (5:42) ORE – Daryle Hawkins 17-yard pass from Marcus Mariota, Rob Beard kick (Drive: 10 plays, 88 yards, 2:45; Oregon 7–0)

Second quarter

- (5:55) ORE – Rob Beard 27-yard field goal (Drive: 17 plays, 62 yards, 5:21; Oregon 10–0)
- (0:28) ORE – Rob Beard 41-yard field goal (Drive: 16 plays, 50 yards, 3:31; Oregon 13–0)

Third quarter

- (6:41) ORE – Colt Lyerla 1-yard run, Rice Jackson two-point pass to Rob Beard (Drive: 3 plays, 37 yards, 0:39; Oregon 21–0)
- (1:01) ORE – Bralon Addison 55-yard pass from Marcus Mariota, Rob Beard kick (Drive: 2 plays, 57 yards, 0:34; Oregon 28–0)

Fourth quarter

- (14:08) ORE – Ifo Ekpre-Olomu 54-yard interception return, Rob Beard kick (Oregon 35–0)
- (4:02) ORE – Bryan Bennett 8-yard run, Rob Beard kick (Drive: 12 plays, 86 yards, 6:35; Oregon 42–0)
- (3:53) ORE – Troy Hill 29-yard interception return, Rob Beard kick (Oregon 49–0)

Statistics	ARIZ	ORE
First downs	19	25
Total yards	332	495
Rushing yards	32–89	53–228
Passing yards	243	267
Passing: Comp–Att–Int	27–52–4	21–36–1
Time of possession	26:27	33:33

Team	Category	Player	Statistics
Arizona	Passing	Matt Scott	22/44, 210 yards, 3 INT
Arizona	Rushing	Ka'Deem Carey	21 carries, 79 yards
Arizona	Receiving	David Richards	7 receptions, 50 yards
Oregon	Passing	Marcus Mariota	20/35, 260 yards, 2 TD, INT
Oregon	Rushing	Kenjon Barner	20 carries, 86 yards
Oregon	Receiving	Bralon Addison	3 receptions, 83 yards, TD

=== vs No. 18 Oregon State ===
No. 18 Oregon State Beavers (2–0) vs Arizona Wildcats (3–1) – Game summary

Quarter	1	2	3	4	Total
No. 18 Beavers	7	10	7	14	38
Wildcats	0	7	21	7	35

at Arizona Stadium • Tucson, AZ

- Date: September 29, 2012
- Game time: 7:00 p.m.
- Game weather: Clear with full moon, 86 °F (30 °C)
- Game attendance: 44,153
- Referee: Jack Folliard
- TV: Pac-12 Network

Game information

First quarter

- (2:05) OSU – Markus Wheaton 2-yard pass from Sean Mannion, Trevor Romaine kick (Drive: 9 plays, 83 yards, 4:01; Oregon State 7–0)

Second quarter

- (10:59) OSU – Trevor Romaine 30-yard field goal (Drive: 10 plays, 81 yards, 4:01; Oregon State 10–0)
- (6:10) OSU – Tyler Anderson 1-yard run, Trevor Romaine kick (Drive: 7 plays, 77 yards, 3:01; Oregon State 17–0)
- (3:29) ARIZ – Ka'Deem Carey 1-yard run, John Bonano kick (Drive: 9 plays, 85 yards, 2:04; Oregon State 17–7)

Third quarter

- (11:22) ARIZ – Austin Hill 3-yard pass from Matt Scott, John Bonano kick (Drive: 10 plays, 91 yards, 3:31; Oregon State 17–14)
- (8:48) ARIZ – Ka'Deem Carey 24-yard run, John Bonano kick (Drive: 3 plays, 52 yards, 1:00; Arizona 21–17)
- (6:10) OSU – Storm Woods 1-yard run, Trevor Romaine kick (Drive: 7 plays, 50 yards, 2:50; Oregon State 24–21)
- (0:19) ARIZ – Dan Buckner 16-yard pass from Matt Scott, John Bonano kick (Drive: 4 plays, 40 yards, 1:06; Arizona 28–24)

Fourth quarter

- (8:35) OSU – Markus Wheaton 20-yard pass from Sean Mannion, Trevor Romaine kick (Drive: 7 plays, 86 yards, 2:04; Oregon State 31–28)
- (5:34) ARIZ – Austin Hill 7-yard pass from Matt Scott, John Bonano kick (Drive: 10 plays, 75 yards, 3:01; Arizona 35–31)
- (1:09) OSU – Connor Hamlett 9-yard pass from Sean Mannion, Trevor Romaine kick (Drive: 10 plays, 75 yards, 4:25; Oregon State 38–35)

Statistics	OSU	ARIZ
First downs	30	28
Total yards	613	545
Rushing yards	43–180	23–142
Passing yards	433	403
Passing: Comp–Att–Int	29–45–0	31–53–2
Time of possession	36:41	23:19

Team	Category	Player	Statistics
Oregon State	Passing	Sean Mannion	29/45, 433 yards, 3 TD
Oregon State	Rushing	Storm Woods	29 carries, 161 yards, TD
Oregon State	Receiving	Markus Wheaton	10 receptions, 166 yards, 2 TD
Arizona	Passing	Matt Scott	31/53, 403 yards, 3 TD, 2 INT
Arizona	Rushing	Ka'Deem Carey	17 carries, 115 yards, 2 TD
Arizona	Receiving	Dan Buckner	6 receptions, 119 yards, TD

=== at No. 18 Stanford ===
Arizona Wildcats (3–2) at No. 18 Stanford Cardinal (3–1) – Game summary

Quarter	1	2	3	4	OT	Total
Wildcats	0	13	20	15	0	48
#18 Cardinal	7	7	20	14	6	54

at Stanford Stadium • Palo Alto, CA

- Date: October 6, 2012
- Game time: 12:00 p.m.
- Game weather: Partly Cloudy, 63 °F (17 °C)
- Game attendance: 48,204
- Referee: Jack Wood
- TV: Fox

Game information

First quarter

- (9:28) STAN – Zach Ertz 11-yard pass from Josh Nunes, Jordan Williamson kick (Drive: 11 plays, 65 yards, 5:32; Stanford 7–0)

Second quarter

- (12:06) ARIZ – Ka'Deem Carey 13-yard run, John Bonano kick (Drive: 12 plays, 81 yards, 2:54; Tied 7–7)
- (6:20) ARIZ – John Bonano 33-yard field goal (Drive: 17 plays, 64 yards, 4:29; Arizona 10–7)
- (2:48) STAN – Levine Toilolo 12-yard pass from Josh Nunes, Jordan Williamson kick (Drive: 8 plays, 75 yards, 3:32; Stanford 14–10)
- (0:15) ARIZ – John Bonano 33-yard field goal (Drive: 13 plays, 60 yards, 2:33; Stanford 14–13)

Third quarter

- (13:06) ARIZ – Ka'Deem Carey 1-yard run, John Bonano kick (Drive: 7 plays, 75 yards, 1:54; Arizona 20–14)
- (10:51) STAN – Josh Nunes 2-yard run, Jordan Williamson kick (Drive: 5 plays, 85 yards, 2:09; Stanford 21–20)
- (8:17) ARIZ – Austin Hill 12-yard pass from Matt Scott, John Bonano kick (Drive: 9 plays, 75 yards, 2:34; Arizona 27–21)
- (2:28) STAN – Stepfan Taylor 6-yard run, Jordan Williamson kick (Drive: 7 plays, 90 yards, 2:44; Stanford 28–27)
- (1:11) ARIZ – Austin Hill 17-yard pass from Matt Scott, two-point pass failed (Drive: 5 plays, 75 yards, 1:17; Arizona 33–28)
- (0:28) STAN – Kelsey Young 55-yard run, two-point pass failed (Drive: 2 plays, 70 yards, 0:36; Stanford 34–33)

Fourth quarter

- (12:29) ARIZ – Ka'Deem Carey 8-yard run, Matt Scott two-point pass to Austin Hill (Drive: 10 plays, 75 yards, 2:59; Arizona 41–34)
- (9:13) ARIZ – Terrence Miller 10-yard pass from Matt Scott, John Bonano kick (Drive: 6 plays, 45 yards, 2:19; Arizona 48–34)
- (6:34) STAN – Josh Nunes 1-yard run, Jordan Williamson kick (Drive: 9 plays, 60 yards, 2:32; Arizona 48–41)
- (0:45) STAN – Josh Nunes 3-yard run, Jordan Williamson kick (Drive: 14 plays, 79 yards, 4:58; Tied 48–48)

Overtime

- STAN – Stepfan Taylor 21-yard run (Drive: 2 plays, 25 yards; Stanford 54–48)

Statistics	ARIZ	STAN
First downs	38	27
Total yards	617	617
Rushing yards	34–126	43–257
Passing yards	491	360
Passing: Comp–Att–Int	45–69–1	21–34–0
Time of possession	28:21	31:39

Team	Category	Player	Statistics
Arizona	Passing	Matt Scott	45/69, 491 yards, 3 TD, INT
Arizona	Rushing	Ka'Deem Carey	29 carries, 132 yards, 3 TD
Arizona	Receiving	Austin Hill	11 receptions, 165 yards, 2 TD
Stanford	Passing	Josh Nunes	21/34, 360 yards, 2 TD
Stanford	Rushing	Stepfan Taylor	31 carries, 142 yards, 2 TD
Stanford	Receiving	Levine Toilolo	5 receptions, 141 yards, TD

=== vs Washington ===
Washington Huskies (3–3) vs Arizona Wildcats (3–3) – Game summary

Quarter	1	2	3	4	Total
Huskies	3	14	0	0	17
Wildcats	10	21	14	7	52

at Arizona Stadium • Tucson, AZ

- Date: October 20, 2012
- Game time: 7:00 p.m.
- Game weather: Clear, 79 °F (26 °C)
- Game attendance: 50,148
- Referee: Land Clark
- TV: Pac-12 Network

Game information

First quarter

- (9:49) WASH – Travis Coons 43-yard field goal (Drive: 14 plays, 55 yards, 5:11; Washington 3–0)
- (7:48) ARIZ – David Richards 27-yard pass from Matt Scott, John Bonano kick (Drive: 7 plays, 75 yards, 1:55; Arizona 7–3)
- (0:06) ARIZ – John Bonano 24-yard field goal (Drive: 10 plays, 81 yards, 2:55; Arizona 10–3)

Second quarter

- (8:19) ARIZ – Matt Scott 1-yard run, John Bonano kick (Drive: 11 plays, 41 yards, 3:46; Arizona 17–3)
- (4:43) ARIZ – Garic Wharton 33-yard pass from Matt Scott, John Bonano kick (Drive: 10 plays, 62 yards, 2:38; Arizona 24–3)
- (3:41) WASH – Austin Seferian-Jenkins 6-yard pass from Keith Price, Travis Coons kick (Drive: 5 plays, 75 yards, 1:02; Arizona 24–10)
- (2:37) ARIZ – Austin Hill 53-yard pass from Matt Scott, John Bonano kick (Drive: 3 plays, 75 yards, 1:04; Arizona 31–10)
- (0:13) WASH – Bishop Sankey 1-yard run, Travis Coons kick (Drive: 3 plays, 3 yards, 0:14; Arizona 31–17)

Third quarter

- (12:23) ARIZ – Austin Hill 17-yard pass from Matt Scott, John Bonano kick (Drive: 6 plays, 43 yards, 2:21; Arizona 38–17)
- (9:35) ARIZ – Richard Morrison 63-yard punt return, John Bonano kick (Arizona 45–17)

Fourth quarter

- (11:32) ARIZ – Ka'Deem Carey 2-yard run, John Bonano kick (Drive: 8 plays, 46 yards, 5:00; Arizona 52–17)

Statistics	WASH	ARIZ
First downs	25	23
Total yards	613	545
Rushing yards	29–124	49–277
Passing yards	256	256
Passing: Comp–Att–Int	29–52–2	14–22–1
Time of possession	32:26	27:34

Team	Category	Player	Statistics
Washington	Passing	Keith Price	29/52, 256 yards, TD, 2 INT
Washington	Rushing	Bishop Sankey	19 carries, 87 yards, TD
Washington	Receiving	Austin Seferian-Jenkins	8 receptions, 110 yards, TD
Arizona	Passing	Matt Scott	14/22, 256 yards, 4 TD, INT
Arizona	Rushing	Ka'Deem Carey	29 carries, 172 yards, TD
Arizona	Receiving	Dan Buckner	5 receptions, 86 yards

=== vs No. 10 USC ===
No. 10 USC Trojans (6–1) vs Arizona Wildcats (4–3) – Game summary

Quarter	1	2	3	4	Total
#9 Trojans	0	21	7	8	36
Wildcats	10	3	13	13	39

at Arizona Stadium • Tucson, AZ

- Date: October 27, 2012
- Game time: 12:30 p.m.
- Game weather: Sunny and Clear, 78 °F (26 °C)
- Game attendance: 47,822
- Referee: Michael Batlan
- TV: ABC

Game information

First quarter

- (7:20) ARIZ – Johnny Jackson 8-yard pass from Matt Scott, John Bonano kick (Drive: 7 plays, 60 yards, 1:55; Arizona 7–0)
- (0:48) ARIZ – John Bonano 27-yard field goal (Drive: 11 plays, 76 yards, 3:34; Arizona 10–0)

Second quarter

- (10:07) USC – Xavier Grimble 12-yard pass from Matt Barkley, Andre Heidari kick (Drive: 4 plays, 84 yards, 1:20; Arizona 10–7)
- (4:36) USC – Marqise Lee 49-yard pass from Matt Barkley, Andre Heidari kick (Drive: 4 plays, 65 yards, 1:36; USC 14–10)
- (2:38) ARIZ – John Bonano 44-yard field goal (Drive: 4 plays, 1 yard, 0:59; USC 14–13)
- (0:42) USC – D.J. Morgan 3-yard run, Andre Heidari kick (Drive: 6 plays, 79 yards, 1:49; USC 21–13)

Third quarter

- (10:37) USC – Marqise Lee 44-yard pass from Matt Barkley, Andre Heidari kick (Drive: 7 plays, 87 yards, 3:35; USC 28–13)
- (3:56) ARIZ – Matt Scott 10-yard run, John Bonano kick (Drive: 5 plays, 71 yards, 1:18; USC 28–20)
- (1:42) ARIZ – Dan Buckner 9-yard pass from Matt Scott, two-point run failed (Drive: 4 plays, 37 yards, 0:54; USC 28–26)

Fourth quarter

- (10:46) ARIZ – Ka'Deem Carey 7-yard run, two-point pass failed (Drive: 7 plays, 72 yards, 3:05; Arizona 32–28)
- (5:36) ARIZ – David Richards 7-yard pass from Matt Scott, John Bonano kick (Drive: 9 plays, 49 yards, 3:54; Arizona 39–28)
- (4:40) USC – Silas Redd 10-yard run, Matt Barkley two-point pass to Marqise Lee (Drive: 3 plays, 27 yards, 0:41; Arizona 39–36)

Statistics	USC	ARIZ
First downs	28	30
Total yards	618	588
Rushing yards	26–125	43–219
Passing yards	493	369
Passing: Comp–Att–Int	31–49–2	27–51–1
Time of possession	30:02	29:58

Team	Category	Player	Statistics
USC	Passing	Matt Barkley	31/49, 493 yards, 3 TD, 2 INT
USC	Rushing	D.J. Morgan	9 carries, 63 yards, TD
USC	Receiving	Marqise Lee	16 receptions, 345 yards, 2 TD
Arizona	Passing	Matt Scott	27/50, 369 yards, 3 TD, INT
Arizona	Rushing	Ka'Deem Carey	28 carries, 119 yards, TD
Arizona	Receiving	Austin Hill	10 receptions, 259 yards

=== at No. 25 UCLA ===
No. 24 Arizona Wildcats (5–3) at No. 25 UCLA Bruins (6–2) – Game summary

Quarter	1	2	3	4	Total
#24 Wildcats	0	3	7	0	10
#25 Bruins	21	21	10	14	66

at Rose Bowl • Pasadena, CA

- Date: November 3, 2012
- Game time: 7:30 p.m.
- Game weather: Dark, 70 °F (21 °C)
- Game attendance: 81,673
- Referee: Terry Leyden
- TV: Pac-12 Network

Game information

First quarter

- (12:27) UCLA – Johna Franklin 37-yard run, Ka'i Fairbairn kick (Drive: 9 plays, 75 yards, 2:33; UCLA 7–0)
- (9:48) UCLA – Brett Hundley 6-yard run, Ka'i Fairbairn kick (Drive: 7 plays, 34 yards, 1:44; UCLA 14–0)
- (3:13) UCLA – Jordan Payton 17-yard pass from Brett Hundley, Ka'i Fairbairn kick (Drive: 14 plays, 85 yards, 5:26; UCLA 21–0)

Second quarter

- (11:14) UCLA – Damien Thigpen 1-yard run, Ka'i Fairbairn kick (Drive: 3 plays, 39 yards, 1:19; UCLA 28–0)
- (6:47) ARIZ – John Bonano 28-yard field goal (Drive: 12 plays, 65 yards, 4:27; UCLA 28–3)
- (3:07) UCLA – Johna Franklin 2-yard run, Ka'i Fairbairn kick (Drive: 11 plays, 75 yards, 3:40; UCLA 35–3)
- (0:14) UCLA – Joseph Fauria 1-yard pass from Brett Hundley, Ka'i Fairbairn kick (Drive: 6 plays, 32 yards, 1:44; UCLA 42–3)

Third quarter

- (9:58) UCLA – Ka'i Fairbairn 25-yard field goal (Drive: 10 plays, 75 yards, 3:30; UCLA 45–3)
- (7:18) ARIZ – Ka'Deem Carey 2-yard run, John Bonano kick (Drive: 12 plays, 79 yards, 2:36; UCLA 45–10)
- (5:21) UCLA – Joseph Fauria 28-yard pass from Brett Hundley, Ka'i Fairbairn kick (Drive: 1 play, 28 yards, 0:06; UCLA 52–10)

Fourth quarter

- (10:49) UCLA – Steven Manfro 14-yard run, Ka'i Fairbairn kick (Drive: 8 plays, 72 yards, 2:13; UCLA 59–10)
- (5:47) UCLA – Melvin Emesibe 3-yard run, Ka'i Fairbairn kick (Drive: 12 plays, 60 yards, 4:01; UCLA 66–10)

Statistics	ARIZ	UCLA
First downs	18	36
Total yards	257	611
Rushing yards	40–121	63–308
Passing yards	136	303
Passing: Comp–Att–Int	17–30–0	25–30–0
Time of possession	26:16	33:44

Team	Category	Player	Statistics
Arizona	Passing	Matt Scott	15/25, 124 yards
Arizona	Rushing	Ka'Deem Carey	16 carries, 54 yards, TD
Arizona	Receiving	Austin Hill	5 receptions, 57 yards
UCLA	Passing	Brett Hundley	23/28, 288 yards, 3 TD
UCLA	Rushing	Johna Franklin	24 carries, 162 yards, 2 TD
UCLA	Receiving	Joseph Fauria	5 receptions, 81 yards, 2 TD

=== vs Colorado ===
Colorado Buffaloes (1–8) vs Arizona Wildcats (5–4) – Game summary

Quarter	1	2	3	4	Total
Buffaloes	10	7	0	14	31
Wildcats	7	21	21	7	56

at Arizona Stadium • Tucson, AZ

- Date: November 10, 2012
- Game time: 11:30 a.m.
- Game weather: Partly Cloudy, 52 °F (11 °C)
- Game attendance: 51,236
- Referee: Jack Folliard
- TV: Fox

Game information

First quarter

- (11:59) COLO – Christia Powell 7-yard run, Will Oliver kick (Drive: 1 play, 7 yards, 0:05; Colorado 7–0)
- (9:01) ARIZ – Ka'Deem Carey 10-yard run, John Bonano kick (Drive: 9 plays, 80 yards, 2:57; Tied 7–7)
- (0:36) COLO – Will Oliver 18-yard field goal (Drive: 15 plays, 69 yards, 8:18; Colorado 10–7)

Second quarter

- (13:31) ARIZ – Ka'Deem Carey 13-yard run, John Bonano kick (Drive: 8 plays, 64 yards, 1:59; Arizona 14–10)
- (10:30) ARIZ – Ka'Deem Carey 30-yard run, John Bonano kick (Drive: 2 plays, 49 yards, 0:24; Arizona 21–10)
- (11:59) COLO – Christia Powell 1-yard run, Will Oliver kick (Drive: 13 plays, 75 yards, 7:46; Arizona 21–17)
- (10:07) ARIZ – Dan Buckner 21-yard pass from B.J. Denker, John Bonano kick (Drive: 6 plays, 79 yards, 1:28; Arizona 28–17)

Third quarter

- (13:04) ARIZ – Dan Buckner 9-yard pass from B.J. Denker, John Bonano kick (Drive: 6 plays, 73 yards, 1:53; Arizona 35–17)
- (6:47) ARIZ – Ka'Deem Carey 8-yard run, John Bonano kick (Drive: 7 plays, 49 yards, 2:09; Arizona 42–17)
- (1:30) ARIZ – B.J. Denker 10-yard run, John Bonano kick (Drive: 2 plays, 81 yards, 0:28; Arizona 49–17)

Fourth quarter

- (13:15) COLO – Donta Abron 10-yard run, Will Oliver kick (Drive: 7 plays, 64 yards, 3:11; Arizona 49–24)
- (10:22) COLO – Scott Fernandez 71-yard pass from Connor Wood, Will Oliver kick (Drive: 3 plays, 75 yards, 1:05; Arizona 49–31)
- (8:01) ARIZ – Ka'Deem Carey 3-yard run, John Bonano Kick (Drive: 5 plays, 88 yards, 2:15; Arizona 56–31)

Statistics	COLO	ARIZ
First downs	24	21
Total yards	437	574
Rushing yards	56–224	38–438
Passing yards	213	136
Passing: Comp–Att–Int	16–20–1	12–14–0
Time of possession	41:48	18:12

Team	Category	Player	Statistics
Colorado	Passing	Nick Hirschman	12/13, 123 yards, INT
Colorado	Rushing	Christia Powell	37 carries, 137 yards, 2 TD
Colorado	Receiving	Scott Fernandez	1 reception, 71 yards, TD
Arizona	Passing	B.J. Denker	12/14, 136 yards, 2 TD
Arizona	Rushing	Ka'Deem Carey	25 carries, 366 yards, 5 TD
Arizona	Receiving	David Richards	3 receptions, 39 yards

=== at Utah ===
Arizona Wildcats (6–4) at Utah Utes (4–6) – Game summary

Quarter	1	2	3	4	Total
Wildcats	3	14	0	17	34
Utes	0	14	10	0	24

at Rice-Eccles Stadium • Salt Lake City, UT

- Date: November 17, 2012
- Game time: 8:00 p.m.
- Game weather: Cloudy with Rain, 50 °F (10 °C)
- Game attendance: 45,031
- Referee: Land Clark
- TV: ESPNU

Game information

First quarter

- (2:15) ARIZ – John Bonano 44-yard field goal (Drive: 7 plays, 58 yards, 1:56; Arizona 3–0)

Second quarter

- (12:10) UTAH – Colem Petersen 3-yard run, Colem Petersen kick (Drive: 11 plays, 87 yards, 5:02; Utah 7–3)
- (9:22) ARIZ – Ka'Deem Carey 1-yard run, John Bonano kick (Drive: 8 plays, 75 yards, 2:48; Arizona 10–7)
- (7:59) ARIZ – Matt Scott 10-yard run, John Bonano kick (Drive: 5 plays, 27 yards, 1:13; Arizona 17–7)
- (3:45) UTAH – Jake Murphy 34-yard pass from Travis Wilson, Colem Petersen kick (Drive: 9 plays, 70 yards, 4:11; Arizona 17–14)

Third quarter

- (6:49) UTAH – Colem Petersen 24-yard field goal (Drive: 9 plays, 57 yards, 4:32; Tied 17–17)
- (5:21) UTAH – DeVonte Christopher 36-yard pass from Travis Wilson, Colem Petersen kick (Drive: 7 plays, 66 yards, 3:18; Utah 24–17)

Fourth quarter

- (13:55) ARIZ – Daniel Jenkins 2-yard run, John Bonano kick (Drive: 11 plays, 75 yards, 3:04; Tied 24–24)
- (11:07) ARIZ – Austin Hill 18-yard pass from Matt Scott, John Bonano kick (Drive: 4 plays, 41 yards, 1:20; Arizona 31–24)
- (1:15) ARIZ – John Bonano 24-yard field goal (Drive: 5 plays, 23 yards, 2:14; Arizona 34–24)

Statistics	ARIZ	UTAH
First downs	27	21
Total yards	480	449
Rushing yards	46–320	36–136
Passing yards	160	313
Passing: Comp–Att–Int	12–27–0	29–41–0
Time of possession	24:57	35:03

Team	Category	Player	Statistics
Arizona	Passing	Matt Scott	12/27, 160 yards, TD
Arizona	Rushing	Ka'Deem Carey	26 carries, 204 yards, TD
Arizona	Receiving	Austin Hill	6 receptions, 96 yards, TD
Utah	Passing	Travis Wilson	28/40, 311 yards, 2 TD
Utah	Rushing	John White	27 carries, 112 yards
Utah	Receiving	DeVonte Christopher	3 receptions, 84 yards, TD

=== vs Arizona State ===
Arizona State Sun Devils (6–5) vs Arizona Wildcats (7–4) – Game summary

Quarter	1	2	3	4	Total
Sun Devils	0	14	3	24	41
Wildcats	6	3	18	7	34

at Arizona Stadium • Tucson, AZ

- Date: November 23, 2012
- Game time: 8:00 p.m.
- Game weather: Clear, 71 °F (22 °C)
- Game attendance: 51,901
- Referee: Jay Stricherz
- TV: ESPN

Game information

First quarter

- (7:59) ARIZ – Ka'Deem Carey 1-yard run, kick failed (Drive: 11 plays, 69 yards, 3:38; Arizona 6–0)

Second quarter

- (9:42) ASU – Marion Grice 52-yard run, Alex Garoutte kick (Drive: 6 plays, 75 yards, 2:13; Arizona State 7–6)
- (6:16) ASU – Marion Grice 2-yard run, Alex Garoutte kick (Drive: 9 plays, 62 yards, 3:12; Arizona State 14–6)
- (0:00) ARIZ – John Bonano 33-yard field goal (Drive: 7 plays, 62 yards, 2:00; Arizona State 14–9)

Third quarter

- (12:29) ASU – Jon Mora 26-yard field goal (Drive: 10 plays, 66 yards, 2:31; Arizona State 17–9)
- (9:22) ARIZ – Austin Hill 22-yard pass from Matt Scott, John Bonano kick (Drive: 11 plays, 83 yards, 3:02; Arizona 17–16)
- (6:23) ARIZ – Garic Wharton 40-yard pass from Matt Scott, John Bonano run for two-point conversion (Drive: 8 plays, 68 yards, 1:35; Arizona 24–17)
- (4:14) ARIZ – John Bonano 23-yard field goal (Drive: 6 plays, 19 yards, 2:04; Arizona 27–17)

Fourth quarter

- (11:51) ASU – Jon Mora 39-yard field goal (Drive: 12 plays, 56 yards, 2:57; Arizona 27–20)
- (7:17) ASU – Marion Grice 4-yard run, Alex Garoutte kick (Drive: 6 plays, 56 yards, 1:22; Tied 27–27)
- (5:34) ASU – Cameron Marshall 8-yard run, Alex Garoutte kick (Drive: 1 play, 8 yards, 0:04; Arizona State 34–27)
- (2:51) ASU – Michael Eubank 1-yard run, Alex Garoutte kick (Drive: 3 plays, 2 yards, 0:26; Arizona State 41–27)
- (1:54) ARIZ – David Richards 17-yard pass from Matt Scott, John Bonano Kick (Drive: 5 plays, 75 yards, 0:57; Arizona State 41–34)

Statistics	ASU	ARIZ
First downs	24	36
Total yards	460	522
Rushing yards	55–269	57–292
Passing yards	191	230
Passing: Comp–Att–Int	16–29–0	19–39–3
Time of possession	29:18	30:42

Team	Category	Player	Statistics
Arizona State	Passing	Taylor Kelly	16/29, 191 yards
Arizona State	Rushing	Marion Grice	18 carries, 156 yards, 3 TD
Arizona State	Receiving	Jamal Miles	5 receptions, 39 yards
Arizona	Passing	Matt Scott	19/39, 230 yards, 3 TD, 3 INT
Arizona	Rushing	Ka'Deem Carey	25 carries, 172 yards, TD
Arizona	Receiving	Garic Wharton	6 receptions, 89 yards, TD

Arizona wore red helmets for the first time since the 1980 season for their rivalry game with Arizona State.

=== vs Nevada (New Mexico Bowl) ===
Nevada Wolf Pack (7–5) vs Arizona Wildcats (7–5) – Game summary
(2012 Gildan New Mexico Bowl)

Quarter	1	2	3	4	Total
Wolf Pack	21	10	14	3	48
Wildcats	7	21	0	21	49

at University Stadium • Albuquerque, NM

- Date: December 15, 2012
- Game time: 11:00 a.m.
- Game weather: Mostly Cloudy, 47 °F (8 °C)
- Game attendance: 24,610
- Referee: Brad Allen
- TV: ESPN

Game information

First quarter

- (12:12) NEV – Stefphon Jefferson 16-yard run, Allen Hardison kick (Drive: 8 plays, 75 yards, 2:48; Nevada 7–0)
- (4:43) NEV – Zach Sudfeld 17-yard pass from Cody Fajardo, Allen Hardison kick (Drive: 8 plays, 48 yards, 3:13; Nevada 14–0)
- (4:29) NEV – Zach Sudfeld 28-yard pass from Cody Fajardo, Allen Hardison kick (Drive: 1 play, 28 yards, 0:06; Nevada 21–0)
- (1:52) ARIZ – Ka'Deem Carey 21-yard run, John Bonano kick (Drive: 11 plays, 72 yards, 2:31; Nevada 21–7)

Second quarter

- (12:46) ARIZ – Matt Scott 1-yard run, John Bonano kick (Drive: 9 plays, 71 yards, 2:20; Nevada 21–14)
- (10:23) ARIZ – Ka'Deem Carey 1-yard run, John Bonano kick (Drive: 8 plays, 59 yards, 1:21; Tied 21–21)
- (5:57) NEV – Stefphon Jefferson 14-yard run, Allen Hardison kick (Drive: 11 plays, 76 yards, 4:20; Nevada 28–21)
- (4:22) ARIZ – Ka'Deem Carey 9-yard run, John Bonano kick (Drive: 6 plays, 75 yards, 1:35; Tied 28–28)
- (0:02) NEV – Allen Hardison 27-yard field goal (Drive: 16 plays, 66 yards, 4:22; Nevada 31–28)

Third quarter

- (9:19) NEV – Richy Turner 33-yard pass from Cody Fajardo, Allen Hardison kick (Drive: 11 plays, 89 yards, 4:13; Nevada 38–28)
- (7:17) NEV – Cody Fajardo 1-yard run, Allen Hardison kick (Drive: 15 plays, 83 yards, 6:26; Nevada 45–28)

Fourth quarter

- (14:44) ARIZ – Austin Hill 63-yard pass from Matt Scott, John Bonano kick (Drive: 7 plays, 89 yards, 1:41; Nevada 45–35)
- (1:48) NEV – Allen Hardison 25-yard field goal (Drive: 10 plays, 30 yards, 4:27; Nevada 48–35)
- (0:46) ARIZ – Austin Hill 2-yard pass from Matt Scott, John Bonano Kick (Drive: 7 plays, 75 yards, 1:02; Nevada 48–42)
- (0:19) ARIZ – Tyler Slavin 2-yard pass from Matt Scott, John Bonano Kick (Drive: 3 plays, 51 yards, 0:21; Arizona 49–48)

Statistics	NEV	ARIZ
First downs	39	31
Total yards	659	578
Rushing yards	73–403	36–196
Passing yards	256	382
Passing: Comp–Att–Int	22–32–2	28–47–2
Time of possession	39:10	20:50

Team	Category	Player	Statistics
Nevada	Passing	Cody Fajardo	22/31, 256 yards, 3 TD, 2 INT
Nevada	Rushing	Stefphon Jefferson	34 carries, 180 yards, 2 TD
Nevada	Receiving	Richy Turner	6 receptions, 96 yards, TD
Arizona	Passing	Matt Scott	28/47, 382 yards, 3 TD, 2 INT
Arizona	Rushing	Ka'Deem Carey	28 carries, 172 yards, 3 TD
Arizona	Receiving	Austin Hill	8 receptions, 175 yards, 2 TD

== Rankings ==
Ranking movements Legend: ██ Increase in ranking ██ Decrease in ranking — = Not ranked RV = Received votes
	Week															
Poll	Pre	1	2	3	4	5	6	7	8	9	10	11	12	13	14	Final
AP	—	—	24	22	RV	RV	RV	RV	RV	24	RV	RV	RV	RV	—	
Coaches	—	—	25	21	RV	—	—	—	—	RV	—	—	RV	RV	—	
Harris	Not released						RV	—	—	RV	RV	RV	RV	RV	—	Not released
BCS	Not released							—	—	22	—	—	24	—	—	Not released

== Statistics ==
=== Scores by quarter (all opponents) ===
	1	2	3	4	Total
Arizona	20	41	35	43	139
All opponents	14	14	17	10	55

=== Scores by quarter (Pac-12 opponents) ===
	1	2	3	4	Total
Arizona	36	75	116	64	291
Pac-12 Opponents	55	104	75	109	343

== Notes ==
Arizona Wildcats linebacker Rob Hankins retired due to a concussion injury.

== Radio ==
- KCUB 1290 AM Tucson
- KHYT 107.5 FM Tucson
- KTKT 990 AM Tucson (Spanish)
- KFNX 1100 AM Phoenix
- KTAN 1420 AM Sierra Vista
- KDAP 96.5 FM Douglas, Arizona
- KWRQ 102.3 FM Safford, Arizona/Thatcher, Arizona
- KIKO 1340 AM Globe, Arizona
- KVWM 970 AM Show Low, Arizona/Pinetop-Lakeside, Arizona
- XENY 760 Nogales, Sonora (Spanish)

== Television ==
- Football Radio Show – KCUB 1290 in Tucson
- La Hora de Los Gatos – KTKT 990 in Tucson

=== Television affiliates ===
- Fox Sports Arizona
- KWBA Tucson
- KGUN Tucson
- Comcast Channel 17
