= 2012 Utah Utes football team =

American college football season

2012 Utah Utes football
- Conference: Pac-12 Conference
- South Division
- Record: 5–7 (3–6 Pac-12)
- Head coach: Kyle Whittingham (8th season)
- Offensive coordinator: Brian Johnson (1st season)
- Offensive scheme: Multiple
- Defensive coordinator: Kalani Sitake (4th season)
- Base defense: 4–3
- Captains: Dave Kruger; Star Lotulelei; Luke Matthews; John White
- Home stadium: Rice-Eccles Stadium

2012 Pac-12 Conference football standings
| | Conf. | | | Overall |
| Team | W | | L | W | | L |
|---|---|---|---|---|---|---|
North Division
| No. 7 Stanford xy$ | 8 | – | 1 | 12 | – | 2 |
| No. 2 Oregon x% | 8 | – | 1 | 12 | – | 1 |
| No. 20 Oregon State | 6 | – | 3 | 9 | – | 4 |
| Washington | 5 | – | 4 | 7 | – | 6 |
| California | 2 | – | 7 | 3 | – | 9 |
| Washington State | 1 | – | 8 | 3 | – | 9 |
South Division
| UCLA xy | 6 | – | 3 | 9 | – | 5 |
| Arizona State | 5 | – | 4 | 8 | – | 5 |
| USC | 5 | – | 4 | 7 | – | 6 |
| Arizona | 4 | – | 5 | 8 | – | 5 |
| Utah | 3 | – | 6 | 5 | – | 7 |
| Colorado | 1 | – | 8 | 1 | – | 11 |
Championship: Stanford 27, UCLA 24
$ – BCS representative as conference champion; % – BCS at-large representative; x – Division champion/co-champions; y – Championship game participant; Rankings from AP Poll

The 2012 Utah Utes football team represented the University of Utah during the 2012 NCAA Division I FBS football season. The team was coached by eighth year head coach Kyle Whittingham and played their home games in Rice-Eccles Stadium in Salt Lake City, Utah. They were a member of the South Division of the Pac-12 Conference. They finished the season 5–7, 3–6 in Pac-12 play to finish in fifth place in the South Division.

== Schedule ==
| Date | Time | Opponent | Site | TV | Result | Attendance |
|---|---|---|---|---|---|---|
| August 30 | 5:15 p.m. | Northern Colorado* | Rice-Eccles Stadium; Salt Lake City, UT | P12N | W 41–0 | 45,273 |
| September 7 | 6:00 p.m. | at Utah State* | Romney Stadium; Logan, UT (Battle of the Brothers) | ESPN2 | L 20–27 ^{OT} | 25,513 |
| September 15 | 8:00 p.m. | No. 25 BYU*^{†} | Rice-Eccles Stadium; Salt Lake City, UT (Holy War) | ESPN2 | W 24–21 | 45,653 |
| September 22 | 8:00 p.m. | at Arizona State | Sun Devil Stadium; Tempe, AZ | P12N | L 7–37 | 58,107 |
| October 4 | 7:00 p.m. | No. 13 USC | Rice-Eccles Stadium; Salt Lake City, UT | ESPN | L 28–38 | 46,037 |
| October 13 | 1:00 p.m. | at UCLA | Rose Bowl; Pasadena, CA | FOX | L 14–21 | 66,303 |
| October 20 | 8:30 p.m. | at No. 8 Oregon State | Reser Stadium; Corvallis, OR | ESPN2 | L 7–21 | 45,769 |
| October 27 | 7:45 p.m. | California | Rice-Eccles Stadium; Salt Lake City, UT | P12N | W 49–27 | 45,017 |
| November 3 | 1:00 p.m. | Washington State | Rice-Eccles Stadium; Salt Lake City, UT | P12N | W 49–6 | 45,069 |
| November 10 | 8:30 p.m. | at Washington | CenturyLink Field; Seattle, WA | P12N | L 15–34 | 60,050 |
| November 17 | 8:00 p.m. | Arizona | Rice-Eccles Stadium; Salt Lake City, UT | ESPNU | L 24–34 | 45,031 |
| November 23 | 1:00 p.m. | at Colorado | Folsom Field; Boulder, CO (Rumble in the Rockies) | FX | W 42–35 | 46,052 |
*Non-conference game; ^{†}Homecoming; Rankings from AP Poll released prior to the game; All times are in Mountain time

== Before the season ==
=== Coaching changes ===
On February 2, 2012, Brian Johnson was promoted to offensive coordinator of the team.

== Game summaries ==
=== Northern Colorado ===
Northern Colorado at Utah

| Team | 1 | 2 | 3 | 4 | Total |
|---|---|---|---|---|---|
| Northern Colorado Bears | 0 | 0 | 0 | 0 | 0 |
| • Utah Utes | 0 | 21 | 7 | 13 | 41 |

- Date: August 30
- Location: Rice-Eccles Stadium
  Salt Lake City, UT
- Game start: 5:15 pm MST
- Elapsed time: 3:00
- Game attendance: 45,273
- Game weather: 89 °F (32 °C), Scattered Clouds, winds NW at 10mph
- Referee: Terry Layden
- TV announcers (Pac-12 Network): Kevin Calabro, Adam Archuleta, and Yogi Roth

Utah leads series: 2 – 0

Utah handily shut out Northern Colorado 41–0 on John White's 119 yards rushing. Quarterback Jordan Wynn shook off an early interception to pass for 200 yards and 19 out of 27 completions. Northern Colorado only combined for 114 yards and never crossed midfield during the game.

Scoring summary

| Quarter | Time | Drive | | | Team | Scoring information | Score | |
| Quarter | Time | Plays | Yards | TOP | Team | Scoring information | Northern Colorado | Utah |
|---|---|---|---|---|---|---|---|---|
| 2 | 13:05 | 12 | 74 | 5:54 | Utah | Jake Murphy 10-yard touchdown reception from Jordan Wynn, Coleman Petersen kick good | 0 | 7 |
| 2 | 2:17 | 5 | 40 | 2:33 | Utah | Travis Wilson 3-yard touchdown run, Coleman Petersen kick good | 0 | 14 |
| 2 | 0:34 | 6 | 52 | 0:57 | Utah | John White IV 5-yard touchdown run, Coleman Petersen kick good | 0 | 21 |
| 3 | 10:51 | 5 | 67 | 2:23 | Utah | Travis Wilson 6-yard touchdown run, Coleman Petersen kick good | 0 | 28 |
| 4 | 12:18 | 21 | 91 | 10:42 | Utah | Jake Murphy 8-yard touchdown reception from Jordan Wynn, Coleman Petersen kick No Good | 0 | 34 |
| 4 | 10:42 | | | | Utah | Interception returned 23 yards for touchdown by Joe Kruger, Coleman Petersen kick good | 0 | 41 |
| "TOP" = time of possession. For other American football terms, see Glossary of American football. | | | | | | | 0 | 41 |

=== Utah State ===
Utah at Utah State

| Team | 1 | 2 | 3 | 4 | OT | Total |
|---|---|---|---|---|---|---|
| Utes | 0 | 3 | 10 | 7 | 0 | 20 |
| • Aggies | 13 | 0 | 0 | 7 | 7 | 27 |

- Date: September 7
- Location: Romney Stadium
  Logan, UT
- Game start: 6:06 pm MST
- Elapsed time: 3:38
- Game attendance: 25,513
- Game weather: 80 °F (27 °C), Clear
- Referee: Shawn Hochuli
- TV announcers (ESPN2): Carter Blackburn, Rod Gilmore, and Jemele Hill

Utah leads series: 77 – 28 – 4

Scoring summary

| Quarter | Time | Drive | | | Team | Scoring information | Score | |
| Quarter | Time | Plays | Yards | TOP | Team | Scoring information | Utah | Utah State |
|---|---|---|---|---|---|---|---|---|
| 1 | 7:59 | | | | Utah State | Clayton Christensen recovery of blocked field goal in the end zone for a touchdown, Brock Warren kick good | 0 | 7 |
| 1 | 0:03 | 6 | 72 | 2:13 | Utah State | Joe Hill 15-yard touchdown reception from Chuckie Keeton, Brock Warren kick no good | 0 | 13 |
| 2 | 0:00 | 9 | 48 | 1:11 | Utah | 42-yard field goal by Coleman Peterson | 3 | 13 |
| 3 | 11:34 | 4 | 53 | 1:29 | Utah | Kenneth Scott 28-yard touchdown reception from Travis Wilson, Coleman Peterson kick good | 10 | 13 |
| 3 | 4:22 | 5 | 22 | 2:38 | Utah | 40-yard field goal by Coleman Peterson | 13 | 13 |
| 4 | 9:10 | 3 | 66 | 0:44 | Utah State | Kellen Bartlett 4-yard touchdown reception from Chuckie Keeton, Josh Thompson kick good | 13 | 20 |
| 4 | 3:18 | 5 | 67 | 2:00 | Utah | Kenneth Scott 24-yard touchdown reception from Jon Hays, Coleman Peterson kick good | 20 | 20 |
| OT | | 5 | 25 | | Utah State | Kerwynn Williams 1-yard touchdown run, Josh Thompson kick good | 20 | 27 |
| "TOP" = time of possession. For other American football terms, see Glossary of American football. | | | | | | | 20 | 27 |

=== BYU ===
#25 BYU at Utah

| Team | 1 | 2 | 3 | 4 | Total |
|---|---|---|---|---|---|
| #25 Cougars | 0 | 7 | 0 | 14 | 21 |
| • Utes | 7 | 0 | 17 | 0 | 24 |

- Date: September 15
- Location: Rice-Eccles Stadium
  Salt Lake City, UT
- Game start: 8:15 pm MST
- Elapsed time: 3:45
- Game attendance: 45,653 (6th largest crowd at Rice-Eccles)
- Game weather: 77 °F (25 °C), Clear, winds NE at 9mph
- Referee: Greg Burks
- TV announcers (ESPN2): Mark Neely, Ray Bentley, and Paul Carcaterra

Utah leads series: 55 – 34 – 4

Scoring summary

| Quarter | Time | Drive | | | Team | Scoring information | Score | |
| Quarter | Time | Plays | Yards | TOP | Team | Scoring information | BYU | Utah |
|---|---|---|---|---|---|---|---|---|
| 1 | 9:12 | 2 | 17 | 0:46 | Utah | Westlee Tonga 17-yard touchdown reception from Jon Hays, Coleman Peterson kick good | 0 | 7 |
| 2 | 4:40 | 4 | 33 | 1:38 | BYU | Cody Hoffman 10-yard touchdown reception from Riley Nelson, Riley Stephenson kick good | 7 | 7 |
| 3 | 7:27 | 8 | 23 | 3:28 | Utah | 48-yard field goal by Coleman Peterson | 7 | 10 |
| 3 | 1:58 | | | | Utah | Fumble recovery returned 47 yards for touchdown by Mo Lee, Coleman Peterson kick good | 7 | 17 |
| 3 | 0:57 | 1 | 39 | 0:25 | Utah | Josh Booker 39-yard touchdown reception from Jon Hays, Coleman Peterson kick good | 7 | 24 |
| 4 | 13:43 | 8 | 75 | 2:14 | BYU | Jamaal Williams 7-yard touchdown run, 2-point run/pass good/failed/incomplete | 14 | 24 |
| 4 | 3:39 | 4 | 14 | 1:26 | BYU | Kaneakua Friel 1-yard touchdown reception from Riley Nelson, Riley Stephenson kick good | 21 | 24 |
| "TOP" = time of possession. For other American football terms, see Glossary of American football. | | | | | | | 21 | 24 |

=== Arizona State ===
Utah at Arizona State

| Team | 1 | 2 | 3 | 4 | Total |
|---|---|---|---|---|---|
| Utes | 0 | 7 | 0 | 0 | 7 |
| • Sun Devils | 21 | 10 | 3 | 3 | 37 |

- Date: September 22
- Location: Sun Devil Stadium
  Tempe, AZ
- Game start: 8:00 pm MST
- Elapsed time: 3:10
- Game attendance: 58,107
- Game weather: 99 °F (37 °C), 15% Humidity, winds 3mph
- Referee: Jack Folliard
- TV announcers (Pac-12 Network): Kevin Calabro, Adam Archuleta, and Yogi Roth

Utah trails series: 6 – 17

Scoring summary

| Quarter | Time | Drive | | | Team | Scoring information | Score | |
| Quarter | Time | Plays | Yards | TOP | Team | Scoring information | Utah | Arizona State |
|---|---|---|---|---|---|---|---|---|
| 1 | 10:48 | 4 | 64 | 1:13 | Arizona State | Rashad Ross 38-yard touchdown reception from Taylor Kelly, Alex Garoutte kick good | 0 | 7 |
| 1 | 7:00 | 7 | 59 | 2:10 | Arizona State | Cameron Marshall 1-yard touchdown run, 2-point run/pass good/failed/incomplete | 0 | 14 |
| 1 | 3:53 | 4 | 34 | 2:02 | Arizona State | Marion Grice 10-yard touchdown reception from Taylor Kelly, Alex Garoutte kick good | 0 | 21 |
| 2 | 13:29 | 11 | 91 | 5:24 | Utah | Karl Williams 2-yard touchdown reception from Jon Hays, Coleman Peterson kick good | 7 | 21 |
| 2 | 10:19 | 8 | 88 | 3:04 | Arizona State | 22-yard field goal by Alex Garoutte | 7 | 24 |
| 2 | 4:56 | 10 | 70 | 3:48 | Arizona State | Cameron Marshall 13-yard touchdown reception from Taylor Kelly, Alex Garoutte kick good | 7 | 31 |
| 3 | 5:19 | 10 | 56 | 3:22 | Arizona State | 22-yard field goal by Alex Garoutte | 7 | 34 |
| 4 | 6:23 | 11 | 49 | 4:18 | Arizona State | 43-yard field goal by Alex Garoutte | 7 | 37 |
| "TOP" = time of possession. For other American football terms, see Glossary of American football. | | | | | | | 7 | 37 |

=== USC ===
#13 USC at Utah

| Team | 1 | 2 | 3 | 4 | Total |
|---|---|---|---|---|---|
| • #13 Trojans | 7 | 17 | 0 | 14 | 38 |
| Utes | 14 | 7 | 0 | 7 | 28 |

- Date: October 4
- Location: Salt Lake City, UT
- Game start: 7:01 pm MST
- Elapsed time: 3:22
- Game attendance: 46,037
- Game weather: 64 °F (18 °C), Clear, winds WSW at 4mph
- Referee: Land Clark
- TV announcers (ESPN): Rece Davis, Jesse Palmer, David Pollack, and Samantha Steele

Utah trails series: 3 – 7

Scoring summary

| Quarter | Time | Drive | | | Team | Scoring information | Score | |
| Quarter | Time | Plays | Yards | TOP | Team | Scoring information | USC | Utah |
|---|---|---|---|---|---|---|---|---|
| 1 | 14:13 | | | | Utah | Fumble recovery returned 8 yards for touchdown by Nate Fakahafua, Coleman Peterson kick good | 0 | 7 |
| 1 | 12:15 | 2 | 13 | 1:01 | Utah | Kenneth Scott 11-yard touchdown reception from Jon Hays, Coleman Peterson kick good | 0 | 14 |
| 1 | 7:12 | 9 | 75 | 5:03 | USC | Silas Reed 3-yard touchdown run, Andre Heidari kick good | 7 | 14 |
| 2 | 12:53 | 6 | 22 | 2:14 | USC | 32-yard field goal by Andre Heidari | 10 | 14 |
| 2 | 8:54 | 8 | 81 | 3:59 | Utah | DeVonte Christopher 18-yard touchdown reception from Jon Hays, Coleman Peterson kick good | 10 | 21 |
| 2 | 7:54 | 3 | 74 | 1:00 | USC | Randall Telfer 23-yard touchdown reception from Matt Barkley, Andre Heidari kick good | 17 | 21 |
| 2 | 4:38 | 6 | 34 | 3:16 | USC | Robert Woods 6-yard touchdown reception from Matt Barkley, Andre Heidari kick good | 24 | 21 |
| 4 | 12:10 | 1 | 83 | 0:13 | USC | Marqise Lee 83-yard touchdown reception from Matt Barkley, Andre Heidari kick good | 31 | 21 |
| 4 | 9:30 | | | | USC | Interception returned 38 yards for touchdown by Nickell Robery, Andre Heidari kick good | 38 | 21 |
| 4 | 0:38 | 11 | 63 | 4:40 | Utah | Kelvin York 5-yard touchdown run, Coleman Peterson kick good | 38 | 28 |
| "TOP" = time of possession. For other American football terms, see Glossary of American football. | | | | | | | 38 | 28 |

=== UCLA ===
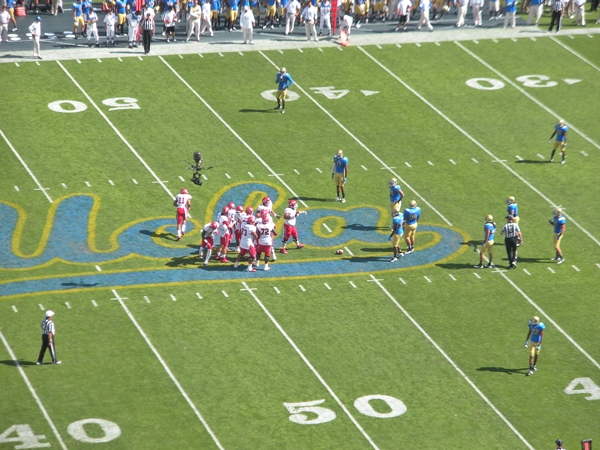
Utah vs. UCLA at the Rose Bowl

Utah at UCLA

| Team | 1 | 2 | 3 | 4 | Total |
|---|---|---|---|---|---|
| Utes | 7 | 0 | 0 | 7 | 14 |
| • Bruins | 14 | 0 | 7 | 0 | 21 |

- Date: October 13
- Location: Pasadena, CA
- Game start: 1:05 pm MST
- Elapsed time: 2:59
- Game attendance: 66,303
- Game weather: 69 °F (21 °C) w/ 54% humidity, Light Haze, winds Nil
- Referee: Jack Wood
- TV announcers (FOX): Craig Bolerjack, Joel Klatt, and Petros Papadakis

Utah trails series: 2 – 8

Scoring summary

| Quarter | Time | Drive | | | Team | Scoring information | Score | |
| Quarter | Time | Plays | Yards | TOP | Team | Scoring information | Utah | UCLA |
|---|---|---|---|---|---|---|---|---|
| 1 | 5:36 | 13 | 69 | 5:49 | UCLA | Brett Hundley 12-yard touchdown run, Kaʻimi Fairbairn kick good | 0 | 7 |
| 1 | 4:31 | | | | Utah | Fumble recovery returned 0 yards for touchdown by Ryan Lacy, Coleman Peterson kick good | 7 | 7 |
| 1 | 3:24 | 3 | 75 | 1:07 | UCLA | Shaquelle Evans 54-yard touchdown reception from Brett Hundley, Kaʻimi Fairbairn kick good | 7 | 14 |
| 3 | 6:04 | 14 | 66 | 5:47 | UCLA | Jonathan Franklin 3-yard touchdown run, Kaʻimi Fairbairn kick good | 7 | 21 |
| 4 | 3:16 | 11 | 90 | 3:01 | Utah | Dres Anderson 1-yard touchdown reception from Jon Hays, Coleman Peterson kick good | 14 | 21 |
| "TOP" = time of possession. For other American football terms, see Glossary of American football. | | | | | | | 14 | 21 |

=== #8 Oregon State ===
Utah at #8 Oregon State

| Team | 1 | 2 | 3 | 4 | Total |
|---|---|---|---|---|---|
| Utes | 0 | 7 | 0 | 0 | 7 |
| • #8 Beavers | 7 | 7 | 0 | 7 | 21 |

- Date: October 20
- Location: Corvallis, OR
- Game start: 8:36 p.m. MST
- Elapsed time: 3:00
- Game attendance: 45,769
- Game weather: 48 °F (9 °C), Cloudy, winds W at 5mph
- Referee: Jay Stricherz
- TV announcers (ESPN2): Joe Tessitore, Matt Millen, and Shannon Spake

Utah trails series: 6 – 9 – 1

Scoring summary

| Quarter | Time | Drive | | | Team | Scoring information | Score | |
| Quarter | Time | Plays | Yards | TOP | Team | Scoring information | Utah | Oregon State |
|---|---|---|---|---|---|---|---|---|
| 1 | 0:57 | 3 | 16 | 1:05 | Oregon State | Storm Woods 1-yard touchdown run, Trevor Romaine kick good | 0 | 7 |
| 2 | 14:27 | 2 | 10 | 0:27 | Oregon State | Storm Woods 2-yard touchdown run, Trevor Romaine kick good | 0 | 14 |
| 2 | 6:00 | 10 | 88 | 5:40 | Utah | Jake Murphy 18-yard touchdown reception from Travis Wilson, Coleman Peterson kick good | 7 | 14 |
| 4 | 7:41 | 7 | 67 | 3:35 | Oregon State | Storm Woods 2-yard touchdown run, Trevor Romaine kick good | 7 | 21 |
| "TOP" = time of possession. For other American football terms, see Glossary of American football. | | | | | | | 7 | 21 |

=== California ===
California at Utah

| Team | 1 | 2 | 3 | 4 | Total |
|---|---|---|---|---|---|
| Golden Bears | 3 | 3 | 7 | 14 | 27 |
| • Utes | 14 | 14 | 14 | 7 | 49 |

- Date: October 27
- Location: Salt Lake City, UT
- Game start: 7:52 p.m. MST
- Elapsed time: 3:13
- Game attendance: 45,017
- Game weather: 50 °F (10 °C), Cloudy, winds NE at 10mph
- Referee: Terry Leyden
- TV announcers (Pac-12 Network Rocky Mountain & Bay Area): Ron Pitts and Kelly Stouffer

Utah trails series: 3 – 5

Utah senior running back Reggie Dunn set an NCAA record with two 100-yard kickoff returns for touchdowns.

Scoring summary

| Quarter | Time | Drive | | | Team | Scoring information | Score | |
| Quarter | Time | Plays | Yards | TOP | Team | Scoring information | California | Utah |
|---|---|---|---|---|---|---|---|---|
| "TOP" = time of possession. For other American football terms, see Glossary of American football. | | | | | | | | |

=== Washington State ===
Washington State at Utah

| Team | 1 | 2 | 3 | 4 | Total |
|---|---|---|---|---|---|
| Cougars | 0 | 0 | 0 | 6 | 6 |
| • Utes | 14 | 17 | 8 | 10 | 49 |

- Date: November 3
- Location: Salt Lake City, UT
- Game start: 1:07 p.m. MST
- Elapsed time: 3:03
- Game attendance: 45,069
- Game weather: 60 °F (16 °C), Partly Cloudy, winds W at 3mph
- Referee: Jack Folliard
- TV announcers (Pac-12 Network): Kevin Calabro, Adam Archuleta, and Yogi Roth

Utah leads series: 6 – 5

Scoring summary

| Quarter | Time | Drive | | | Team | Scoring information | Score | |
| Quarter | Time | Plays | Yards | TOP | Team | Scoring information | Washington State | Utah |
|---|---|---|---|---|---|---|---|---|
| "TOP" = time of possession. For other American football terms, see Glossary of American football. | | | | | | | | |

=== Washington ===
Utah at Washington

| Team | 1 | 2 | 3 | 4 | Total |
|---|---|---|---|---|---|
| Utes | 8 | 0 | 7 | 0 | 15 |
| • Huskies | 0 | 14 | 13 | 7 | 34 |

- Date: November 10
- Location: Seattle, WA
- Game start: 8:37 p.m. MST
- Elapsed time: 3:04
- Game attendance: 60,050
- Game weather: 38 °F (3 °C), Clear, winds Calm
- Referee: Michael Batlan
- TV announcers (Pac-12 Network): Kevin Calabro, Adam Archuleta, and Yogi Roth

Utah trails series: 0 – 7

Scoring summary

| Quarter | Time | Drive | | | Team | Scoring information | Score | |
| Quarter | Time | Plays | Yards | TOP | Team | Scoring information | Utah | Washington |
|---|---|---|---|---|---|---|---|---|
| "TOP" = time of possession. For other American football terms, see Glossary of American football. | | | | | | | | |

=== Arizona ===
Arizona at Utah

| Team | 1 | 2 | 3 | 4 | Total |
|---|---|---|---|---|---|
| • Wildcats | 3 | 14 | 0 | 17 | 34 |
| Utes | 0 | 14 | 10 | 0 | 24 |

- Date: November 17
- Location: Salt Lake City, UT
- Game start: 8:07 MST
- Elapsed time: 2:59
- Game attendance: 45,031
- Game weather: 50 °F (10 °C), Cloudy with Rain, winds ESE 4mph
- Referee: Land Clark
- TV announcers (ESPNU): Joe Davis and Kelly Stouffer

Utah leads series: 20 – 15 – 2

Scoring summary

| Quarter | Time | Drive | | | Team | Scoring information | Score | |
| Quarter | Time | Plays | Yards | TOP | Team | Scoring information | Arizona | Utah |
|---|---|---|---|---|---|---|---|---|
| "TOP" = time of possession. For other American football terms, see Glossary of American football. | | | | | | | | |

=== Colorado ===
Utah at Colorado

| Team | 1 | 2 | 3 | 4 | Total |
|---|---|---|---|---|---|
| • Utes | 10 | 7 | 3 | 22 | 42 |
| Buffaloes | 7 | 7 | 14 | 7 | 35 |

- Date: November 23
- Location: Boulder, CO
- Game start: 1:06 MST
- Elapsed time: 3:06
- Game attendance: 46,052
- Game weather: 43 °F (6 °C), Sunny, winds NE 5mph
- Referee: Jack Wood
- TV announcers (FX): Mike Morgan, J. C. Pearson, and Laura McKeeman

Utah trails series: 24 – 31 – 3

Scoring summary

| Quarter | Time | Drive | | | Team | Scoring information | Score | |
| Quarter | Time | Plays | Yards | TOP | Team | Scoring information | Utah | Colorado |
|---|---|---|---|---|---|---|---|---|
| "TOP" = time of possession. For other American football terms, see Glossary of American football. | | | | | | | | |
