= 2012 Arizona State Sun Devils football team =

American college football season

2012 Arizona State Sun Devils football

Kraft Fight Hunger Bowl champion

Kraft Fight Hunger Bowl, W 62–28 vs. Navy
- Conference: Pac-12 Conference
- South Division
- Record: 8–5 (5–4 Pac-12)
- Head coach: Todd Graham (1st season)
- Offensive coordinator: Mike Norvell (1st season)
- Offensive scheme: Spread
- Defensive coordinator: Paul Randolph (1st season)
- Co-defensive coordinator: Ron West (1st season)
- Base defense: Multiple
- MVPs: Taylor Kelly; Will Sutton
- Captains: Keelan Johnson; Brandon Magee; Cameron Marshall; Andrew Sampson
- Home stadium: Sun Devil Stadium

2012 Pac-12 Conference football standings
	Conf.			Overall
Team	W		L	W		L
North Division
No. 7 Stanford xy$	8	–	1	12	–	2
No. 2 Oregon x%	8	–	1	12	–	1
No. 20 Oregon State	6	–	3	9	–	4
Washington	5	–	4	7	–	6
California	2	–	7	3	–	9
Washington State	1	–	8	3	–	9
South Division
UCLA xy	6	–	3	9	–	5
Arizona State	5	–	4	8	–	5
USC	5	–	4	7	–	6
Arizona	4	–	5	8	–	5
Utah	3	–	6	5	–	7
Colorado	1	–	8	1	–	11
Championship: Stanford 27, UCLA 24
$ – BCS representative as conference champion; % – BCS at-large representative; x – Division champion/co-champions; y – Championship game participant; Rankings from AP Poll

The 2012 Arizona State Sun Devils football team represented Arizona State University in the 2012 NCAA Division I FBS football season. They were led by first year coach Todd Graham and played their home games at Sun Devil Stadium. They were a member of the South Division of the Pac-12 Conference. They finished the season 8–5, 5–4 in Pac-12 play to finish in a tie for second place in the South Division. They were invited to the Kraft Fight Hunger Bowl where they defeated Navy.

== Departures ==
=== Players drafted ===
Round	Pick	Player	Position	NFL team
2	57	Brock Osweiler	Quarterback	Denver Broncos
4	101	Omar Bolden	Cornerback	Denver Broncos
UFA	–	Vontaze Burfict	Linebacker	Cincinnati Bengals
UFA	–	Colin Parker	Linebacker	Arizona Cardinals
UFA	–	Garth Gerhart	Center	Cleveland Browns
UFA	–	Gerell Robinson	Wide receiver	Denver Broncos
UFA	–	Shelly Lyons	Linebacker	Miami Dolphins
UFA	–	Aderious Simmons	Offensive lineman	New Orleans Saints
UFA	–	Aaron Pflugrad	Wide receiver	Philadelphia Eagles
UFA	–	Michael Willie	Wide receiver	San Diego Chargers
UFA	–	Jamaar Jarrett	Outside linebacker	St. Louis Rams

== Schedule ==
Date	Time	Opponent	Site	TV	Result	Attendance
August 30	7:30 pm	Northern Arizona*	Sun Devil Stadium; Tempe, AZ	P12N	W 63–6	48,658
September 8	7:30 pm	Illinois*	Sun Devil Stadium; Tempe, AZ	ESPN	W 45–14	54,128
September 15	4:00 pm	at Missouri*	Faurot Field; Columbia, MO	ESPN2	L 20–24	71,004
September 22	7:00 pm	Utah	Sun Devil Stadium; Tempe, AZ	P12N	W 37–7	58,107
September 29	1:00 pm	at California	Memorial Stadium; Berkeley, CA	FX	W 27–17	51,634
October 11	7:00 pm	at Colorado	Folsom Field; Boulder, CO	ESPN	W 51–17	45,161
October 18	6:00 pm	No. 2 Oregon	Sun Devil Stadium; Tempe, AZ	ESPN	L 21–43	71,004
October 27	12:00 pm	UCLA^{†}	Sun Devil Stadium; Tempe, AZ	FX	L 43–45	55,672
November 3	7:30 pm	at No. 13 Oregon State	Reser Stadium; Corvallis, OR	ESPN2	L 26–36	45,979
November 10	1:00 pm	at No. 21 USC	Los Angeles Memorial Coliseum; Los Angeles, CA	P12N	L 17–38	80,154
November 17	1:00 pm	Washington State	Sun Devil Stadium; Tempe, AZ	P12N	W 46–7	53,438
November 23	8:00 pm	at No. 24 Arizona	Arizona Stadium; Tucson, AZ (Territorial Cup)	ESPN	W 41–34	51,901
December 29	2:00 pm	vs. Navy*	AT&T Park; San Francisco, CA (Kraft Fight Hunger Bowl)	ESPN2	W 62–28	34,172
*Non-conference game; ^{†}Homecoming; Rankings from AP Poll released prior to the game; All times are in Mountain time

== Game summaries ==
=== Northern Arizona ===
	1	2	3	4	Total
Lumberjacks	0	0	6	0	6
Sun Devils	14	28	7	14	63

Marion Grice ran for 3 touchdowns and Taylor Kelly was efficient in his first start as Arizona State opened the Todd Graham era with a 63–6 rout over Northern Arizona on a Thursday night. The Sun Devils dominated NAU from the opening kickoff, forcing three turnovers and rushing for 5 touchdowns while building a 42–0 halftime lead. Cameron Marshall had 2 of ASU's 7 rushing touchdowns, both came in the first quarter. The Sun Devils had over 550 yards of offense while scoring the most points since 2005 by an ASU team.

=== Illinois ===
	1	2	3	4	Total
Fighting Illini	0	7	7	0	14
Sun Devils	14	14	7	10	45

"Taylor Kelly completed 18 of 24 passes for 249 yards and a touchdown, and Arizona State rolled past Illinois 45–14 on Saturday night to improve to 2–0 under new coach Todd Graham." True Freshman Carlos Mendoza had 2 interceptions for ASU starting in place of injured linebacker Brandon Magee who was out with a concussion. Arizona State also completed their first 14 passes, 10 by Taylor Kelly and 4 by Michael Eubank. Chris Coyle finished with a career-high 10 receptions for 131 yards and 2 TDs. ILL was without starting QB Nathan Scheelhaase because of an ankle injury suffered a week earlier.

=== Missouri ===
	1	2	3	4	Total
Sun Devils	0	7	0	13	20
Tigers	10	7	7	0	24

For the second week in a row the Sun Devils faced a backup QB as Jonathan Franklin was ruled out after being announced in the starting lineup. Instead redshirt Freshman Corbin Berkstresser took the field. Missouri jumped out to a 17-point lead that they held until the fourth quarter in front of a sellout crowd of 71,004, the school's first for a non-conference game since Notre Dame in 1984. After a horrible start ASU QB Taylor Kelly rallied the team in the second half going 9 of 11 and passing for 116 yards. The sophomore also rushed for 59 net yards. The game ended with an interception by Kelly as he tried to hit an open Jamal Miles for what would have been the go ahead touchdown. “We beat ourselves with turnovers tonight,” Kelly said. “We have to protect the football a lot better next week.” Josh Hubner had a career-best 62-yard punt in the game.

=== Utah ===
	1	2	3	4	Total
Utes	0	7	0	0	7
Sun Devils	21	10	3	3	37

1st quarter scoring: ASU – Rashad Ross 38-yard pass from Taylor Kelly (Alex Garoutte kick; ASU – L. Govan 1-yard run (Garoutte kick; ASU – Marion Grice 10-yard pass from Kelly (Garoutte kick)

2nd quarter scoring: UTAH – Karl Williams 2-yard pass from Jon Hays (Colem Petersen kick); ASU – Garoutte 22-yard field goal; ASU – Marshall 13-yard pass from Kelly (Garoutte kick)

3rd quarter scoring: ASU – Garoutte 22-yard field goal

4th quarter scoring: ASU – Garoutte 43-yard field goal

=== California ===
	1	2	3	4	Total
Sun Devils	7	10	3	7	27
Bears	0	7	3	7	17

California leads the series 17–14 with the Golden Bears winning the last meeting 47–38 in Tempe.

1st quarter scoring: ASU – Darwin Rogers 1-yard pass from Taylor Kelly (Alex Garoutte kick).

2nd quarter scoring: CAL – Isi Sofele 24-yard run (Vincenzo D'Amato kick); ASU– Garoutte 28-yard field goal; ASU – Kevin Ozier 9-yard pass from Kelly (Garoutte kick).

3rd quarter scoring: ASU – Garoutte 33-yard field goal; CAL – D'Amato 35-yard field goal.

4th quarter scoring: CAL – Keenan Allen 10-pass from Zach Maynard (D'Amato Kick); ASU – Ozier 22-yard pass from Kelly (Garoutte Kick)

=== Colorado ===
	1	2	3	4	Total
Sun Devils	6	14	14	17	51
Buffaloes	0	17	0	0	17

Arizona State starts slow only to dominate in the second half outscoring Colorado 31–0. Linebacker Brandon Magee was quoted before the game that he wanted to pitch a shutout in Colorado on National TV. CU used this as bulletin board material in the days before the game. Taylor Kelly threw for a career-high 5 touchdown passes.

1st quarter scoring: ASU – Marion Grice 37-yard pass from Taylor Kelly

2nd quarter scoring: CU – Tony Jones 2-yard run (Oliver Kick); ASU – D.J. Foster 34-yard pass from Taylor Kelly (Garoutte kick); ASU – Marion Grice 16-yard pass from Taylor Kelly (Garoutte kick); CU – Nick Kasa 20-yard pass from Jordan Webb (Oliver Kick); CU – Will Oliver 37-yard kick.

3rd quarter scoring: ASU – Rashad Ross 100-yard kickoff return (Garoutte kick); ASU – Marion Grice 20-yard pass from Taylor Kelly (Garoutte kick).

4th quarter scoring: ASU – Jon Mora 38-yard kick; ASU – Richard Smith 31-yard pass from Taylor Kelly (Mora kick); ASU – Cameron Marshall 14-yard run (Garoutte kick)

=== Oregon ===
	1	2	3	4	Total
#3 Ducks	22	21	0	0	43
Sun Devils	7	0	0	14	21

1st quarter scoring: ASU – Kevin Ozier 28 Yd Pass From Taylor Kelly (Alex Garoutte Kick); ORE – Kenjon Barner 71 Yd Run (Jackson Rice Pass To Rob Beard For Two-Point Conversion); ORE – Bralon Addison 6 Yd Pass From Marcus Mariota (Beard Kick); ORE – Marcus Mariota 2 Yd Pass From Bryan Bennett (Beard Kick)

2nd quarter scoring: ORE – Kenjon Barner 1 Yd Run (Beard Kick); ORE – Marcus Mariota 86 Yd Run (Beard Kick); ORE – Kenjon Barner 1 Yd Run (Beard Kick)

3rd quarter scoring: No scoring.

4th quarter scoring: ASU – Anthony Jones 36 Yd Interception Return (Garoutte Kick); ASU – D. J. Foster 23 Yd Pass From Michael Eubank (Garoutte Kick)

=== UCLA ===
	1	2	3	4	Total
Bruins	14	7	14	10	45
Sun Devils	14	3	9	17	43

UCLA leads the series, 17–10–1. Last season, UCLA downed ASU 29–28 at the Rose Bowl, a last second field goal attempt by the Sun Devils was just off the mark.

1st quarter scoring: ASU – Kevin Ozier 7-yard pass from Taylor Kelly (Alex Garoutte kick); ASU – Marion Grice 2-yard run (Garoutte kick); UCLA – Johnathan Franklin 3-yard run (Kaʻimi Fairbairn kick); UCLA – Devin Fuller 15-yard pass from Brett Hundley (Fairbairn kick).

2nd quarter scoring: ASU – Jon Mora 36-yard field goal; UCLA – Franklin 5-yard run (Fairbairn kick).

3rd quarter scoring: ASU – Mora 31-yard field goal; UCLA – Damien Thigpen 65-yard pass from Hundley (Fairbairn kick); ASU – Grice 20-yard pass from Kelly (Two-point pass conversion failed); UCLA – Joseph Fauria 4-yard pass from Hundley (Fairbairn kick).

4th quarter scoring: ASU – Grice 8-yard pass from Kelly (Garoutte kick); UCLA – Damien Thigpen 20-yard Pass From Hundley (Fairbairn kick); ASU – Mora 22-yard field goal; ASU – D.J. Foster 7-yard pass from Kelly (Garoutte kick); UCLA – Fairbairn 33-yard field goal.

=== Oregon State ===
	1	2	3	4	Total
Sun Devils	16	3	0	7	26
#11 Beavers	10	9	10	7	36

1st quarter scoring: ASU – Junior Onyeali 1-yard fumble recovery (Garoutte kick); OSU – Trevor Romaine 41-yard kick; ASU – Cameron Marshall 1-yard run (Garoutte kick); OSU – Markus Wheaton 50-yard pass from Cody Vaz (Romaine kick); ASU – Kevin Ayers punt block for safety.

2nd quarter scoring: ASU – Jon Mora 31-yard kick; OSU – Terron Ward 53-yard run; OSU – Trevor Romaine 45-yard kick.

3rd quarter scoring: OSU – Markus Wheaton 17-yard pass from Cody Vaz (Romaine kick); OSU – Trevor Romaine 33-yard kick.

4th quarter scoring: OSU – Brandin Cooks 49-yard pass from Cody Vaz (Romaine kick); ASU – Marion Grice 2-yard pass from Taylor Kelly (Garoutte kick)

=== USC ===
	1	2	3	4	Total
Sun Devils	7	7	3	0	17
#19 Trojans	7	7	14	10	38

1st quarter scoring: ASU – Chris Coyle 34-yard pass from Taylor Kelly (Alex Garoutte kick); USC – Marqise Lee 80-yard pass from Matt Barkley (Andre Heidari kick).

2nd quarter scoring: ASU – Alden Darby 70-yard interception return (Garoutte kick); USC – Xavier Grimble 4-yard pass from Barkley (Heidari kick).

3rd quarter scoring: ASU – Jon Mora 28-yard field goal; USC – Curtis McNeal 5-yard run (Heidari kick); USC – McNeal 22-yard pass from Barkley (Heidari kick).

4th quarter scoring: USC – Heidari 26-yard field goal; USC – McNeal 27-yard run (Heidari kick).

=== Washington State ===
	1	2	3	4	Total
Cougars	0	0	0	7	7
Sun Devils	18	14	14	0	46

Quarterbacks Taylor Kelly and Michael Eubank accounted for six touchdowns Saturday, and Arizona State became bowl eligible with a 46–7 rout over Washington State that ended the Sun Devils' four-game losing streak.

1st quarter scoring: ASU – Jon Mora 21-yard field goal; ASU – Rashard Ross 15-yard pass from Taylor Kelly (Cameron Marshall run for two-point conversion); ASU – Chris Coyle 18-yard pass from Kelly (Alex Garoutte kick).

2nd quarter scoring: ASU – Marion Grice 17-yard pass from Taylor Kelly (Garoutte kick); ASU – Coyle 29-yard pass from Kelly (Garoutte kick).

3rd quarter scoring: ASU – Michael Eubank 1-yard run (Garoutte kick); ASU – Rashad Ross 31-yard pass from Kelly (Garoutte kick).

4th quarter scoring: WSU – Kristoff Williams 54-yard pass from Connor Halliday (Andrew Furney kick).

=== Arizona ===
Arizona State at #24 Arizona

Team	1	2	3	4	Total
• Arizona St	0	14	3	24	41
Arizona	6	3	18	7	34

- Date: November 23
- Location: Arizona Stadium, Tucson, Arizona
- Game start: 10:00 p.m. EST
- Source: ESPN

Scoring summary
1	7:59	ARIZ	Ka'Deem Carey 1-yard run (kick failed)	Arizona 6–0
2	9:42	ASU	Marion Grice 52-yard run (Alex Garoutte kick)	Arizona St 7–6
2	6:16	ASU	Marion Grice 2-yard run (Alex Garoutte kick)	Arizona St 14–6
2	:00	ARIZ	John Bonano 33-yard field goal	Arizona St 14–9
3	12:29	ASU	Jon Mora 26-yard field goal	Arizona St 17–9
3	9:22	ARIZ	Austin Hill 22-yard pass from Matt Scott (John Bonano kick)	Arizona St 17–16
3	6:23	ARIZ	Garic Wharton 40-yard pass from Matt Scott (Jon Bonano run)	Arizona 24–17
3	4:14	ARIZ	Jon Bonano 23-yard field goal	Arizona 27–17
4	11:51	ASU	Jon Mora 39-yard field goal	Arizona 27–20
4	7:17	ASU	Marion Grice 4-yard run (Alex Garoutte kick)	Tie 27–27
4	5:34	ASU	Cameron Marshall 8-yard run (Alex Garoutte kick)	Arizona St 34–27
4	2:51	ASU	Michael Eubank 1-yard run (Alex Garoutte kick)	Arizona St 41–27
4	1:54	ARIZ	David Richards 17-yard pass from Matt Scott (Jon Bonano kick)	Arizona St 41–34

== Roster ==
- Does not reflect actual depth chart

Wide receiver

- 4 Alonzo Agwuenu- (redshirt) JR
- 88 Josiah Blandin-FR
- 81 Gary Chambers- (redshirt) FR
- 84 Tevin Favor-SO
- 89 Frederick Gammage-FR
- 80 J.J. Holliday- (redshirt) JR
- 85 Karl Holmes- (redshirt) FR
- 86 Daniel Masifilo- (redshirt) SO
- 7 Kyle Middlebrooks-JR
- 32 Jamal Miles-SR
- 82 Kevin Ozier- (redshirt) JR
- 9 A.J. Pickens- (redshirt) SR
- 89 Parker Rasmusson-FR
- 15 Rashad Ross -SR
- 3 Richard Smith-FR

Tight end

- 48 Alex Bykovskiy- (redshirt) FR
- 87 Chris Coyle-JR
- 83 Kody Kohl-FR
- 17 Darwin Rogers-JR
- 44 Max Smith- (redshirt) JR

Offensive line

- 58 Sil Ajawara- (redshirt) SO
- 74 Jamil Douglas- (redshirt) SO
- 62 Evan Finkenberg- (redshirt) JR
- 56 Devin Goodman- (redshirt) FR
- 57 Evan Goodman-FR
- 78 Kyle Johnson- (redshirt) SR
- 67 Kody Koebensky- (redshirt) JR
- 76 Mo Latu- (redshirt) FR
- 77 Stephon McCray-FR
- 75 William McGehee-SO
- 72 Andrew Sampson- (redshirt) SR
- 79 Chip Sarafin - (redshirt) SO
- 71 Brice Schwab- (redshirt) SR
- 54 Tyler Sulka- (redshirt) SO
- 73 Vi Teofilo- (redshirt) FR

Quarterback

- 2 Mike Bercovici-SO
- 18 Michael Eubank- (redshirt) FR
- 10 Taylor Kelly- (redshirt) SO
- 12 Danny Lewis- (redshirt) FR
- 14 Ryan Woods-JR

Running back

- 37 Dante Alexander- (redshirt) SO
- 30 Terrell Davis-FR
- 8 D. J. Foster -FR
- 1 Marion Grice-JR
- 6 Cameron Marshall-SR
- 22 James Morrison- (redshirt) SR
- 35 R.J. Robinson- (redshirt) JR
- 20 Marcus Washington- (redshirt) SO

Fullback

- 28 Danny Clark- (redshirt) FR

Defensive line

- 91 Cutter Baldock- (redshirt) FR
- 43 Davon Coleman-JR
- 95 Gannon Conway- (redshirt) JR
- 49 Jordan McDonald- (redshirt) SO
- 5 Junior Onyeali-JR
- 96 Toa Tuitea- (redshirt) SR
- 92 Jaxon Hood-FR
- 93 Sean O'Grady- (redshirt) FR
- 99 Mike Pennel-JR
- 68 Corey Adams-SR
- 61 C.J. Ryan-JR
- 91 Jake Sheffield-JR
- 90 Will Sutton- (redshirt) JR

Defensive back

- 39 Kevin Anderson- (redshirt) SO
- 16 Jarrid Bryant- (redshirt) JR
- 1 Deveron Carr- (redshirt) SR
- 29 Kushmir Miller -FR
- 14 Joe Eason- (redshirt) FR
- 24 Osahon Irabor- (redshirt) JR
- 18 Oliver Johnson-JR
- 35 Ronald Kennedy Jr.- (redshirt) JR
- 13 Rashad Wadood-SO
- 23 Ezekiel Bishop- (redshirt) FR
- 3 Deantre Lewis- (redshirt) SO
- 9 Robert Nelson- (redshirt) JR
- 22 Dwain Bradshaw-JR

Linebacker

- 57 Charles Beatty- (redshirt) SR
- 52 Carl Bradford- (redshirt) SO
- 58 Salamo Fiso-FR
- 55 Jason Franklin-SO
- 41 Brock Haman- (redshirt) FR
- 53 Brandon Johnson- (redshirt) JR
- 31 Anthony Jones- (redshirt) JR
- 46 Kipeli Koniseti-JR
- 8 Brandon Magee- (redshirt) SR
- 38 Israel Marshall- (redshirt) FR
- 2 Steffon Martin-JR
- 7 Carlos Mendoza-FR
- 36 CJ Overton-JR
- 34 Matthew Rowe-FR
- 56 Grandville Taylor- (redshirt) JR

Long snapper

- 64 Easton Wahlstrom-FR

Kicker

- 25 Alex Garoutte- (redshirt) SO
- 98 Dillon Jackson-JR
- 97 Jon Mora-JR

Punter

- 47 Josh Hubner-SR

== Rankings ==
Ranking movements Legend: ██ Increase in ranking ██ Decrease in ranking — = Not ranked RV = Received votes
	Week															
Poll	Pre	1	2	3	4	5	6	7	8	9	10	11	12	13	14	Final
AP	—	RV	RV	RV	RV	RV	RV	RV	RV	—	—	—	—	—	—	RV
Coaches	—	RV	RV	RV	RV	RV	RV	24	RV	—	—	—	—	RV	RV	RV
Harris	Not released						RV	24	RV	—	—	—	—	RV	RV	Not released
BCS	Not released							—	—	—	—	—	—	—	—	Not released

== After the Season ==
=== Players drafted ===
Round	Pick	Player	Position	NFL team
UFA	–	Dan Knapp	Offensive lineman	Cincinnati Bengals
UFA	–	Brandon Magee	Linebacker	Dallas Cowboys
UFA	–	Jamal Miles	Wide receiver	Jacksonville Jaguars
UFA	–	Keelan Johnson	Safety	Miami Dolphins
UFA	–	Cameron Marshall	Running back	Miami Dolphins
UFA	–	Deveron Carr	Cornerback	Tampa Bay Buccaneers
UFA	–	Brice Schwab	Offensive lineman	Tampa Bay Buccaneers
UFA	–	Rashad Ross	Wide receiver	Tennessee Titans
