= 2012 Colorado Buffaloes football team =

American college football season

2012 Colorado Buffaloes football
- Conference: Pac-12 Conference
- South Division
- Record: 1–11 (1–8 Pac-12)
- Head coach: Jon Embree (2nd season)
- Offensive coordinator: Eric Bieniemy (2nd season)
- Defensive coordinator: Greg Brown (2nd season)
- Home stadium: Folsom Field

2012 Pac-12 Conference football standings
	Conf.			Overall
Team	W		L	W		L
North Division
No. 7 Stanford xy$	8	–	1	12	–	2
No. 2 Oregon x%	8	–	1	12	–	1
No. 20 Oregon State	6	–	3	9	–	4
Washington	5	–	4	7	–	6
California	2	–	7	3	–	9
Washington State	1	–	8	3	–	9
South Division
UCLA xy	6	–	3	9	–	5
Arizona State	5	–	4	8	–	5
USC	5	–	4	7	–	6
Arizona	4	–	5	8	–	5
Utah	3	–	6	5	–	7
Colorado	1	–	8	1	–	11
Championship: Stanford 27, UCLA 24
$ – BCS representative as conference champion; % – BCS at-large representative; x – Division champion/co-champions; y – Championship game participant; Rankings from AP Poll

The 2012 Colorado Buffaloes football team represented the University of Colorado Boulder in the Pac-12 Conference during the 2012 NCAA Division I FBS football season. Led by second-year head coach and alumnus Jon Embree, the Buffaloes played home games on campus at Folsom Field in Boulder, Colorado.

The season was a disaster for the Buffaloes, who were regularly blown out by their opponents. CU lost to FCS Sacramento State, 30–28, and only managed a single win with a late comeback at Washington State (who would finish last in the Pac-12 North) 35–34, in Mike Leach's first season with the Cougars. Among those losses, they lost 69–14 at Fresno State, got shut out 48–0 at home vs Stanford, 70–14 at Oregon, 51–17 to Arizona State, 42-14 vs UCLA, and 50–6 at USC. The Buffaloes lost by about 28 points a game, and allowed 46 points a game (worst in the FBS that year).

Two days after the season on November 25, Embree was fired; he compiled a 4–21 (.160) record, including 1–11 in his final year. To date, this is the worst season in program history. Since 1917, CU previously had one-win seasons twice (1980, 1984; both 1–10).

== Schedule ==
Date	Time	Opponent	Site	TV	Result	Attendance	Source
September 1	2:00 p.m.	vs. Colorado State*	Sports Authority Field at Mile High; Denver, CO (Rocky Mountain Showdown)	FX	L 17–22	58,607	
September 8	1:00 p.m.	Sacramento State*	Folsom Field; Boulder, CO	P12N	L 28–30	46,843	
September 15	6:00 p.m.	at Fresno State*	Bulldog Stadium; Fresno, CA	CBSSN	L 14–69	27,513	
September 22	2:00 p.m.	at Washington State	Martin Stadium; Pullman, WA	FX	W 35–34	31,668	
September 29	4:00 p.m.	UCLA	Folsom Field; Boulder, CO	P12N	L 14–42	46,893	
October 11	7:00 p.m.	Arizona State	Folsom Field; Boulder, CO	ESPN	L 17–51	45,161	
October 20	4:00 p.m.	at No. 11 USC	Los Angeles Memorial Coliseum; Los Angeles, CA	P12N	L 6–50	83,274	
October 27	1:00 p.m.	at No. 2 Oregon	Autzen Stadium; Eugene, OR	P12N	L 14–70	57,521	
November 3	12:00 p.m.	No. 15 Stanford^{†}	Folsom Field; Boulder, CO	FX	L 0–48	44,138	
November 10	11:30 a.m.	at Arizona	Arizona Stadium; Tucson, AZ	FX	L 31–56	51,236	
November 17	11:30 a.m.	Washington	Folsom Field; Boulder, CO	FX	L 3–38	43,148	
November 23	1:00 p.m.	Utah	Folsom Field; Boulder, CO (Rumble in the Rockies)	FX	L 35–42	46,052	
*Non-conference game; ^{†}Homecoming; Rankings from AP Poll released prior to the game; All times are in Mountain time

== Postseason ==
On November 25, 2012, the university announced that Athletic Director Mike Bohn had fired head coach Jon Embree.
