= 2012 Oregon State Beavers football team =

American college football season

2012 Oregon State Beavers football

Alamo Bowl, L 27–31 vs. Texas
- Conference: Pac-12 Conference
- North Division

Ranking
- Coaches: No. 19
- AP: No. 20
- Record: 9–4 (6–3 Pac-12)
- Head coach: Mike Riley (12th season)
- Offensive coordinator: Danny Langsdorf (8th season)
- Offensive scheme: Multiple
- Defensive coordinator: Mark Banker (10th season)
- Base defense: 4–3
- Captains: Sean Mannion; Jordan Poyer; Andrew Seumalo; Markus Wheaton
- Home stadium: Reser Stadium

2012 Pac-12 Conference football standings
	Conf.			Overall
Team	W		L	W		L
North Division
No. 7 Stanford xy$	8	–	1	12	–	2
No. 2 Oregon x%	8	–	1	12	–	1
No. 20 Oregon State	6	–	3	9	–	4
Washington	5	–	4	7	–	6
California	2	–	7	3	–	9
Washington State	1	–	8	3	–	9
South Division
UCLA xy	6	–	3	9	–	5
Arizona State	5	–	4	8	–	5
USC	5	–	4	7	–	6
Arizona	4	–	5	8	–	5
Utah	3	–	6	5	–	7
Colorado	1	–	8	1	–	11
Championship: Stanford 27, UCLA 24
$ – BCS representative as conference champion; % – BCS at-large representative; x – Division champion/co-champions; y – Championship game participant; Rankings from AP Poll

The 2012 Oregon State Beavers football team represented Oregon State University during the 2012 NCAA Division I FBS football season. The team's head coach was Mike Riley, in his tenth straight season and twelfth overall. Home games were played at Reser Stadium in Corvallis, and they were members of the North Division of the Pac-12 Conference. The Beavers finished the season 9–4 and 6–3 in Pac-12 play; third place in the North Division and fourth overall. They were invited to the Alamo Bowl and were defeated by the Texas Longhorns.

== Schedule ==
Date	Time	Opponent	Rank	Site	TV	Result	Attendance
September 8	1:00 pm	No. 13 Wisconsin*		Reser Stadium; Corvallis, OR	FX	W 10–7	42,189
September 22	12:30 pm	at No. 19 UCLA		Rose Bowl; Pasadena, CA	ABC/ESPN2	W 27–20	54,636
September 29	7:00 pm	at Arizona	No. 18	Arizona Stadium; Tucson, AZ	P12N	W 38–35	44,153
October 6	3:00 pm	Washington State	No. 14	Reser Stadium; Corvallis, OR	P12N	W 19–6	46,579
October 13	12:30 pm	at BYU*	No. 10	LaVell Edwards Stadium; Provo, UT	ABC	W 42–24	63,484
October 20	7:30 pm	Utah^{†}	No. 8	Reser Stadium; Corvallis, OR	ESPN2	W 21–7	45,769
October 27	7:15 pm	at Washington	No. 7	CenturyLink Field; Seattle, WA	P12N	L 17–20	60,842
November 3	7:30 pm	Arizona State	No. 13	Reser Stadium; Corvallis, OR	ESPN2	W 36–26	45,979
November 10	12:00 pm	at No. 16 Stanford	No. 13	Stanford Stadium; Stanford, CA	FOX	L 23–27	47,127
November 17	7:30 pm	California	No. 15	Reser Stadium; Corvallis, OR	P12N	W 62–14	43,779
November 24	12:00 pm	No. 5 Oregon	No. 16	Reser Stadium; Corvallis, OR (Civil War)	P12N	L 24–48	47,249
December 1	11:30 am	Nicholls State*	No. 16	Reser Stadium; Corvallis, OR	P12N	W 77–3	32,427
December 29	3:45 pm	vs. Texas	No. 15	Alamodome; San Antonio, TX (Alamo Bowl)	ESPN	L 27–31	65,277
*Non-conference game; ^{†}Homecoming; Rankings from AP Poll released prior to the game; All times are in Pacific time

== Game summaries ==
=== Wisconsin ===
Team	1	2	3	4	Total
Wisconsin	0	0	0	7	7
• Oregon St	0	3	7	0	10

- Date: September 8
- Location: Reser Stadium

Scoring summary
Q2	ORST	Romaine 43 yard field goal	ORST 3–0
Q3	ORST	Cooks 20 yard pass from Mannion (Romaine kick)	ORST 10–0
Q4	WIS	Pederson 11 yard pass from O'Brien (French kick)	ORST 10–7

=== UCLA ===
Team	1	2	3	4	Total
• Oregon St	3	14	7	3	27
UCLA	0	10	0	10	20

- Date: September 22
- Location: Rose Bowl

Scoring summary
Q1	ORST	Romaine 22 yard field goal	ORST 3–0
Q2	UCLA	Fairbairn 22 yard field goal	Tie 3–3
Q2	ORST	Cooks 75 yard pass from Mannion (Romaine kick)	ORST 10–3
Q2	ORST	Wheaton 42 yard pass from Mannion (Romaine kick)	ORST 17–3
Q2	UCLA	Evans 65 yard pass from Hundley (Fairbairn kick)	ORST 17–10
Q3	ORST	Woods 2 yard run (Romaine kick)	ORST 24–10
Q4	UCLA	Hundley 1 yard run (Fairbairn kick)	ORST 24–17
Q4	ORST	Romaine 17 yard field goal	ORST 27–17
Q4	UCLA	Fairbairn 35 yard field goal	ORST 27–20

=== Arizona ===
Team	1	2	3	4	Total
• Oregon St	7	10	7	14	38
Arizona	0	7	21	7	35

- Date: September 29
- Location: Arizona Stadium

Scoring summary
Q1	ORST	Wheaton 2 yard pass from Mannion (Romaine kick)	ORST 7–0
Q2	ORST	Romaine 30 yard field goal	ORST 10–0
Q2	ORST	Anderson 1 yard run (Romaine kick)	ORST 17–0
Q2	ARIZ	Carey 1 yard run (Bonano kick)	ORST 17–7
Q3	ARIZ	Hill 3 yard pass from Scott (Bonano kick)	ORST 17–14
Q3	ARIZ	Carey 24 yard run (Bonano kick)	ARIZ 21–17
Q3	ORST	Woods 1 yard run (Romaine kick)	ORST 24–21
Q3	ARIZ	Buckner 16 yard pass from Scott (Bonano kick)	ARIZ 28–24
Q4	ORST	Wheaton 20 yard pass from Mannion (Romaine kick)	ORST 31–28
Q4	ARIZ	Hill 7 yard pass from Scott (Bonano kick)	ARIZ 35–31
Q4	ORST	Hamlett 9 yard pass from Mannion (Romaine kick)	ORST 38–35

=== Washington State ===
Team	1	2	3	4	Total
Washington St	0	3	0	3	6
• Oregon St	3	3	7	6	19

- Date: October 6
- Location: Reser Stadium

Scoring summary
Q1	ORST	Romaine 30 yard field goal	ORST 3–0
Q2	WSU	Furney 24 yard field goal	Tie 3–3
Q2	ORST	Romaine 24 yard field goal	ORST 6–3
Q3	ORST	Wheaton 12 yard pass from Mannion (Romaine kick)	ORST 13–3
Q4	WSU	Furney 32 yard field goal	ORST 13–6
Q4	ORST	Anderson 1 yard run (kick failed)	ORST 19–6

=== BYU ===
Team	1	2	3	4	Total
• Oregon St	14	0	7	21	42
BYU	7	7	7	3	24

- Date: October 13
- Location: LaVell Edwards Stadium

Scoring summary
Q1	ORST	Wheaton 11 yard pass from Vaz (Romaine kick)	ORST 7–0
Q1	BYU	Williams 1 yard run (Sorensen kick)	Tie 7–7
Q1	ORST	Wheaton 24 yard pass from Vaz (Romaine kick)	ORST 14–7
Q2	BYU	Mahina 2 yard pass from Nelson (Sorensen kick)	Tie 14–14
Q3	ORST	Woods 16 yard run (Romaine kick)	ORST 21–14
Q3	BYU	Williams 2 yard run (Sorensen kick)	Tie 21–21
Q4	ORST	Prince 5 yard pass from Vaz (Romaine kick)	ORST 28–21
Q4	BYU	Sorensen 35 yard field goal	ORST 28–24
Q4	ORST	Wheaton 12 yard run (Romaine kick)	ORST 35–24
Q4	ORST	Poyer 49 yard interception return (Romaine kick)	ORST 42–24

=== Utah ===
Team	1	2	3	4	Total
Utah	0	7	0	0	7
• Oregon St	7	7	0	7	21

- Date: October 20
- Location: Reser Stadium

Scoring summary
Q1	ORST	Woods 1 yard run (Romaine kick)	ORST 7–0
Q2	ORST	Woods 3 yard run (Romaine kick)	ORST 14–0
Q2	UTAH	Murphy 18 yard pass from Wilson (Petersen kick)	ORST 14–7
Q4	ORST	Woods 2 yard run (Romaine kick)	ORST 21–7

=== Washington ===
Team	1	2	3	4	Total
Oregon St	0	0	10	7	17
• Washington	3	7	0	10	20

- Date: October 27
- Location: CenturyLink Field

Scoring summary
Q1	WASH	Coons 45 yard field goal	WASH 3–0
Q2	WASH	Sankey 1 yard run (Coons kick)	WASH 10–0
Q3	ORST	Cooks 54 yard pass from Mannion (Romaine kick)	WASH 10–7
Q3	ORST	Romaine 29 yard field goal	Tie 10–10
Q4	WASH	Sankey 1 yard run (Coons kick)	WASH 17–10
Q4	ORST	Hamlett 29 yard pass from Vaz (Romaine kick)	Tie 17–17
Q4	WASH	Coons 30 yard field goal	WASH 20–17

=== Arizona State ===
Team	1	2	3	4	Total
Arizona St	16	3	0	7	26
• Oregon St	10	9	10	7	36

- Date: November 3
- Location: Reser Stadium

Scoring summary
Q1	ASU	Onyeali 1 yard fumble return (Garoutte kick)	ASU 7–0
Q1	ORST	Romaine 41 yard field goal	ASU 7–3
Q1	ASU	Marshall 1 yard run (Garoutte kick)	ASU 14–3
Q1	ORST	Wheaton 50 yard pass from Vaz (Romaine kick)	AZST 14–10
Q1	ASU	Safety, ball through end zone	ASU 16–10
Q2	ASU	Mora 31 yard field goal	ASU 19–10
Q2	ORST	Ward 53 yard run (kick failed)	ASU 19–17
Q2	ORST	Romaine 45 yard field goal	ORST 20–19
Q3	ORST	Wheaton 17 yard pass from Vaz (Romaine kick)	ORST 27–19
Q3	ORST	Romaine 33 yard field goal	ORST 30–19
Q4	ORST	Cooks 49 yard pass from Vaz (Romaine kick)	ORST 37–19
Q4	ASU	Grice 2 yard pass from Kelly (Garoutte kick)	ORST 37–26

=== Stanford ===
Team	1	2	3	4	Total
Oregon St	0	10	13	0	23
• Stanford	14	0	7	6	27

- Date: November 10
- Location: Stanford Stadium

Scoring summary
Q1	STAN	Taylor 1 yard run (Williamson kick)	STAN 7–0
Q1	STAN	Hewitt 12 yard pass from Hogan (Williamson kick)	STAN 14–0
Q2	ORST	Ward 7 yard run (Romaine kick)	STAN 14–7
Q2	ORST	Romaine 19 yard field goal	STAN 14–10
Q3	ORST	Wheaton 22 yard pass from Vaz (Romaine kick)	ORST 17–14
Q3	ORST	Romaine 42 yard field goal	ORST 20–14
Q3	ORST	Romaine 44 yard field goal	ORST 23–14
Q4	STAN	Taylor 40 yard pass from Hogan (Williamson kick)	ORST 23–21
Q4	STAN	Ertz 13 yard pass from Hogan (run failed)	ORST 27–23

=== California ===
Team	1	2	3	4	Total
California	7	0	7	0	14
• Oregon St	14	21	14	13	62

- Date: November 17
- Location: Reser Stadium

Scoring summary
Q1	ORST	Wheaton 11 yard pass from Mannion (Romaine kick)	ORST 7–0
Q1	CAL	Sofele 9 yard run (D'Amato kick)	Tie 7–7
Q1	ORST	Anderson 1 yard run (Romaine kick)	ORST 14–7
Q2	ORST	Cooks 48 yard pass from Mannion (Romaine kick)	ORST 21–7
Q2	ORST	Hamlett 14 yard pass from Mannion (Romaine kick)	ORST 28–7
Q2	ORST	Hatfield 6 yard pass from Mannion (Romaine kick)	ORST 35–7
Q3	ORST	Woods 1 yard run (Romaine kick)	ORST 42–7
Q3	ORST	Ward 47 yard run (Romaine kick)	ORST 49–7
Q3	CAL	Bridgford 1 yard run (D'Amato kick)	ORST 49–14
Q4	ORST	Ward 17 yard run (kick failed)	ORST 55–14
Q4	ORST	Agnew 8 yard pass from Harrington (Romaine kick)	ORST 62–14

=== Oregon ===
Team	1	2	3	4	Total
• Oregon	6	14	14	14	48
Oregon St	7	3	7	7	24

- Date: November 24
- Location: Reser Stadium

Scoring summary
Q1	ORE	Mariota 42 yard run (two-point conversion failed)	ORE 6–0
Q1	ORST	Woods 7 yard run (Romaine kick)	ORST 7–6
Q2	ORE	Thomas 2 yard run (Maldonado kick)	ORE 13–7
Q2	ORE	Barner 1 yard run (Maldonado kick)	ORE 20–7
Q2	ORST	Romaine 37 yard field goal	ORE 20–10
Q3	ORST	Woods 2 yard run (Romaine kick)	ORE 20–17
Q3	ORE	Thomas 5 yard run (Maldonado kick)	ORE 27–17
Q3	ORE	Thomas 29 yard run (Maldonado kick)	ORE 34–17
Q4	ORE	Barner 1 yard run (Maldonado kick)	ORE 41–17
Q4	ORE	Kelley 2 yard pass from Mariota (Maldonado kick)	ORE 48–17
Q4	ORST	Hatfield 6 yard pass from Mannion (Romaine kick)	ORE 48–24

=== Nicholls State ===
Team	1	2	3	4	Total
Nicholls St	0	0	3	0	3
• Oregon St	14	21	14	28	77

- Date: December 1
- Location: Reser Stadium

Scoring summary
Q1	ORST	Woods 8 yard run (Romaine kick)	ORST 7–0
Q1	ORST	Woods 1 yard run (Romaine kick)	ORST 14–0
Q2	ORST	Wheaton 10 yard run (Romaine kick)	ORST 21–0
Q2	ORST	Ward 15 yard run (Romaine kick)	ORST 28–0
Q2	ORST	Wheaton 2 yard pass from Vaz (Romaine kick)	ORST 35–0
Q3	ORST	Mullaney 4 yard pass from Mannion (Romaine kick)	ORST 42–0
Q3	ORST	Cummings 22 yard pass from Mannion (Romaine kick)	ORST 49–0
Q3	NICH	Dolan 26 yard field goal	ORST 49–3
Q4	ORST	Gwacham 7 yard pass from Vaz (Romaine kick)	ORST 56–3
Q4	ORST	Jenkins 20 yard pass from Vaz (Romaine kick)	ORST 63–3
Q4	ORST	Agnew 11 yard run (Romaine kick)	ORST 70–3
Q4	ORST	Balfour 4 yard run (Romaine kick)	ORST 77–3

On August 29, it was announced that the season opener against Nicholls State would be postponed due to the effects of Hurricane Isaac. Oregon State instead had their season opener against Wisconsin on September 8. The game was rescheduled for December 1.

=== Alamo Bowl ===
Team	1	2	3	4	Total
• Texas	3	7	7	14	31
Oregon St	10	10	7	0	27

- Date: December 29
- Location: Alamodome
- Game weather: Indoors (dome)

Scoring summary
Q1	ORST	Romaine 29 yard field goal	ORST 3–0
Q1	TEX	Jordan 40 yard field goal	Tie 3–3
Q1	ORST	Woods 12 yard run (Romaine kick)	ORST 10–3
Q2	TEX	Goodwin 64 yard run (Jordan kick)	Tie 10–10
Q2	ORST	Romaine 37 yard field goal	ORST 13–10
Q2	ORST	Ward 9 yard run (Romaine kick)	ORST 20–10
Q3	TEX	Ash 11 yard run (Jordan kick)	ORST 20–17
Q3	ORST	Woods 2 yard run (Romaine kick)	ORST 27–17
Q4	TEX	Gray 15 yard pass from Ash (Jordan kick)	ORST 27–24
Q4	TEX	Goodwin 36 yard pass from Ash (Jordan kick)	TEX 31–27

== Interesting Facts ==
- Sean Mannion is the first sophomore captain in program history.
- The Beavers were unbeaten in September for the first time since 2000.
- The Beavers won back-to-back road games for the first time since 2009.
- Mike Riley became the winningest coach in Oregon State football history following the win against Arizona on September 29.
- The Washington State October 6 game is the earliest sellout for a game in any season since stadium expansion in 2005.
- The Beavers did not allow a touchdown in the October 6 Washington State game for the first time since the 2008 Sun Bowl.
- The Beavers did not allow a team to score in the first quarter for the first 4 games.
- Jordan Poyer intercepted three passes in the Washington State October 6 game tying for second-most in school history and is the most since 2003.
- Scott Crichton tallied three sacks in the Washington State October 6 game, becoming the first OSU player to do so since Stephen Paea in 2009.
- Crichton finished the Washington State October 6 game with four tackles for loss, tying for the third-most in a game by an Oregon State player.
- The October 14 ranking of No. 8 is the highest for the Beavers since ending 2000 at No. 4.
- The Beavers were 6–0 for the first time in 105 years, since the 1907 season.
- The sellout of the October 20 Utah game resulted in the first back-to-back home game sellout since 2008.
- The Beavers were 4–0 in the Pac-12 and haven't started that well in conference since the first year of the Pac-8 in 1968.
- The Beavers last held three consecutive opponents to single-digits at home in 1961.
- The Beavers had at least three home sellouts for the first time since the Reser Stadium expansion in 2005.
- The Beavers 62 points in the November 17 Cal game is tied for the second-most ever against a league opponent.
- Sean Mannion tied the school record for most touchdowns in a half with four in the first half of the November 17 Cal game.
- The November 24 game against Oregon broke the Reser Stadium and school attendance record set on October 6 with 47,249 attendees.
- The Beavers set a new single-game points record of 77 points.
- Oregon State finished the regular season with a 9–3 record. The six-win improvement is tied for the best in the nation with Middle Tennessee (2–9 to 8–4) and Ohio State (6–7 to 12–0). It's the biggest swing in wins in Oregon State history.
- The Beavers held four opponents under 9 points for the first time since 2000.
- The Beavers set a new school record of 42 first downs against Nicholls State, surpassing the previous record of 32 set in 1993 against Pacific. Twenty-five came via the pass, also a school record.
- The Beavers went undefeated in non-conference regular season play for the first time since 2002.
- Markus Wheaton surpassed James Rodgers and is now the Oregon State record holder for receptions in a career with 224.

== Roster ==
2012 Oregon State Beavers Football
Quarterbacks: 4 Sean Mannion – sophomore; 10 Gage Johnson –; Sophomore: 5 Richie Harrington – (redshirt) freshman; 14 Cody Vaz – junior; 17 Jack Lomax – junior; Running backs: 19 Jovan Stevenson – junior; 24 Storm Woods – (redshirt) freshman; 28 Terron Ward – sophomore; 30 Malcolm Agnew – sophomore; 34 Jordan Jenkins – senior; Fullbacks: 33 Tyler Anderson – sophomore; 42 Clayton York – senior; 49 Michael Balfour – (redshirt) freshman; Wide receivers: 2 Markus Wheaton – senior; 6 Kramer Ferrell – (redshirt) freshman; 7 Brandin Cooks – sophomore; 8 Richard Mullaney – (redshirt) freshman; 9 Tyler Trosin – (redshirt) freshman; 18 Geno Munoz – senior; 21 Mitch Singler – junior; 23 Jordan Bishop – senior; 37 Jeff Bedbury – sophomore; 40 Garrett Hall – junior; 81 Micah Hatfield – junior; 84 Kevin Cummings – junior; 86 Obum Gwacham – sophomore	Tight ends: 82 Colby Prince – senior; 83 Kellen Clute – (redshirt) freshman; 85 Austin Slade-Matautia – (redshirt) freshman; 87 Noa Aluesi – freshman; 88 Tyler Perry – sophomore; 89 Connor Hamlett – sophomore; Offensive guards: 65 Roman Sapolu – sophomore C; 69 Josh Andrews – junior; Offensive linemen: 51 Michael Beaton – sophomore; 56 Isaac Seumalo – freshman; 63 Justin Addie – (redshirt) freshman; 67 Jake Welch – (redshirt) freshman; 71 Grant Enger – junior; 73 David Vieru – (redshirt) freshman; 75 Derek Nielsen – sophomore; Offensive tackles: 64 Colin Kelly – senior; 72 Darryl Jackson – (redshirt) freshman; 77 Michael Philip – (redshirt) junior	Defensive tackles: 49 Andrew Seumalo – senior; 54 Brandon Bennett-Jackson – (redshirt) freshman; 79 Joe Lopez – sophomore; 90 Ali'i Robins – (redshirt) freshman; 97 Mana Tuivailala – sophomore; 98 Castro Masaniai – senior; 99 John Braun – junior; Defensive ends: 45 Dylan Wynn – sophomore; 56 Rusty Fernando – senior; 59 Lavonte Barnett – (redshirt) freshman; 60 Akeem Gonzales – (redshirt) freshman; 68 Desmond Collins – (redshirt) freshman; 78 Rudolf Fifita – senior; 93 Mana Rosa – junior; 94 Devon Krell – junior; 95 Scott Crichton – sophomore; 99 Blake Harra – (redshirt) junior; Linebackers: 4 D.J. Welch – sophomore; 13 Rueben Robinson – senior; 39 Kyle Egan – sophomore; 40 Michael Doctor – junior; 41 Feti Taumoepeau – senior; 44 Jabral Johnson – sophomore; 46 Shiloah Te'o – senior; 47 Josh Williams – sophomore; 48 Jaswha James – (redshirt) freshman; 51 Charlie Gilmur – junior; 53 Kyle Gardner – (redshirt) freshman; 55 Shaydon Akuna – sophomore	Cornerbacks: 6 Sean Martin – junior; 14 Jordan Poyer – senior; 15 Larry Scott – (redshirt) freshman; 16 Rashaad Reynolds – junior; 20 Keynan Parker – senior; 21 Ryan Handford – senior; 22 Malcolm Marable – sophomore; 23 Mishawn Cummings – (redshirt) sophomore; 27 Naji Patrick – (redshirt) freshman; 32 Danny Evans – senior; 38 Brian Watkins – senior; Safeties: 3 Anthony Watkins – senior; 8 Tyrequek Zimmerman – sophomore; 9 Peter Ashton – (redshirt) freshman; 25 Ryan Murphy – sophomore; 29 Will Storey – (redshirt) freshman; 30 Zeke Sanders – junior; 37 Micah Audiss – (redshirt) freshman; Long snappers: 52 Troy Whalen – (redshirt) freshman; 58 Michael Morovick – sophomore; Place kickers: 12 Trevor Romaine – sophomore; 18 Max Johnson – sophomore; -- Andrew Mikkelsen – freshman; Punters: 26 Tim McMullen – (redshirt) junior; 48 Keith Kostol – sophomore
Sources: 2012 Oregon State Beaver Football Roster

== Rankings ==
Ranking movements Legend: ██ Increase in ranking ██ Decrease in ranking — = Not ranked RV = Received votes
	Week															
Poll	Pre	1	2	3	4	5	6	7	8	9	10	11	12	13	14	Final
AP	—	—	—	RV	18	14	10	8	7	13	13	15	16	16	15	20
Coaches	—	—	—	RV	21	17	14	11	9	13	12	17	17	17	14	19
Harris	Not released						12	10	8	13	12	16	15	15	15	Not released
BCS	Not released							8	7	11	11	16	15	15	13	Not released
