= Matt Caponi =

American football coach

Biographical details
- Born: Pittsburgh, Pennsylvania, U.S.

Playing career
- 2000–2003: Mount Union
- Position(s): Safety

Coaching career (HC unless noted)
- 2004: Mount Union (SA)
- 2005: Mount Union (LB)
- 2006–2007: Washington & Jefferson (DB)
- 2008–2010: Washington & Jefferson (DC/DB)
- 2011: Pittsburgh (GA)
- 2012: Arizona (GA)
- 2013–2015: Arizona (S)
- 2016–2018: West Virginia (DB)
- 2019–2022: Iowa State (CB)
- 2023: North Texas (DC/CB)
- 2024: North Texas (DC)

Matt Caponi is an American college football coach. He was most recently the defensive coordinator for the North Texas Mean Green.

== College career ==
Caponi attended Mount Union College—now known as University of Mount Union—in Alliance, Ohio, where he played football for four years as a safety for the Mount Union Purple Raiders. He was a team captain and earned Second-Team All-Conference honors as a senior i 2003. Caponi helped Mount Union achieve a 55–1 record and win three NCAA Division III Football Championships during his four years.

== Coaching career ==
Caponi started his coaching career at Mount Union as a student assistant. After one year with Mount Union as a student assistant he was promoted to coach the linebackers. Caponi's next stop was with Washington & Jefferson as their defensive backs coach. After two years as the defensive backs coach, Washington & Jefferson promoted Caponi to be the defensive coordinator. Caponi was then hired by Pittsburgh as a graduate assistant. After one year in Pittsburgh, Caponi joined Arizona as a graduate assistant. Caponi was then promoted to coach the safeties for Arizona after one season as a graduate assistant. Then after four total year with Arizona, Caponi's next stop was as the defensive backs coach for West Virginia. After three years with West Virginia as the defensive backs coach, Iowa State hired Caponi to coach the cornerbacks. Then after three years with Iowa State, Caponi got his first FBS defensive coordinator job, as he was hired by North Texas to be the defensive coordinator and cornerbacks coach. Caponi was fired as the Mean Green's defensive coordinator on November 16, 2024 following a 27–48 loss to UTSA, where the Mean Green defense allowed 681 yards of total offense.
