= Jamal Miles =

American football player (born 1991)

No. 2 – Arizona Rattlers
- Positions: Wide receiver, Kick returner
- Roster status: Active
- CFL status: American

Personal information
- Born: February 28, 1991 (age 35); Peoria, Arizona, U.S.
- Listed height: 5 ft 9 in (1.75 m)
- Listed weight: 190 lb (86 kg)

Career information
- High school: Peoria
- College: Arizona State

Career history
- 2013: Jacksonville Jaguars*
- 2013–2014: Edmonton Eskimos
- 2017–present: Arizona Rattlers
- * Offseason or practice squad member only

Awards and highlights
- United Bowl champion (2017); IFL National Champion (2024); Second-team All-Pac-12 (2011)

Jamal Miles (born February 28, 1991) is an American professional football wide receiver for the Arizona Rattlers of the Indoor Football League (IFL). Miles played college football for the Arizona State Sun Devils. He was undrafted in the 2013 NFL draft and signed as an undrafted free agent by the Jacksonville Jaguars.

== Early life ==
Miles attended Peoria High School, where he was selected to the first-team All-4A conference as a senior after rushing for 2,168 yards on 231 carries. He was rated a 4-star prospect and number 6 in the state of Arizona by Rivals.com.

== College career ==
At Arizona State University, Miles was used primarily as a return specialist throughout college and became one of the Sun Devils' most prolific return men. He was also a contributor both in the backfield and as a receiver. He had 10 career receiving touchdowns, 2 rushing touchdowns, 1 passing touchdown and 4 return touchdowns.

=== Statistics ===
Year	Team	Receiving				Rushing			Kickoff returns				Punt returns			
Year	Team	Rec	Yards	Avg	TD	Att	Yards	TD	Att	Yards	Avg	TD	Att	Yards	Avg	TD
2009	Arizona State	6	58	9.7	0	3	13	0	31	611	19.7	0	0	0	--	0
2010	Arizona State	25	203	8.1	4	27	63	2	3	118	39.3	1	29	248	8.6	0
2011	Arizona State	60	361	6.0	6	29	237	0	30	788	26.3	2	14	232	16.6	1
2012	Arizona State	37	373	10.1	0	15	67	0	16	349	21.8	0	26	230	8.8	0
Career		128	995	7.8	10	74	380	2	80	1,866	23.3	3	69	710	10.3	1

== Professional career ==
On April 28, 2013, Miles was added as an undrafted free agent by the Jacksonville Jaguars to their training camp roster. On August 19, 2013, Miles was waived by the Jaguars. After being released, Miles signed with the Edmonton Eskimos on September 4, 2013.

On January 17, 2017, Miles was signed by the Arizona Rattlers of the Indoor Football League. On July 8, the Rattlers defeated the Sioux Falls Storm in the United Bowl by a score of 50–41.
