= Matt Scott (gridiron football) =

American gridiron football player (born 1990)

No. 5, 8
- Position: Quarterback

Personal information
- Born: September 20, 1990 (age 36); Corona, California, U.S.
- Listed height: 6 ft 3 in (1.91 m)
- Listed weight: 210 lb (95 kg)

Career information
- High school: Corona (CA) Centennial
- College: Arizona
- NFL draft: 2013: undrafted

Career history
- Jacksonville Jaguars (2013)*; Cincinnati Bengals (2014)*; Edmonton Eskimos (2014)
- * Offseason or practice squad member only

Awards and highlights
- Second-team All-Pac-12 (2012); 2012 New Mexico Bowl MVP (Team MVP 2010, 2012)
- Stats at Pro Football Reference
- Stats at CFL.ca (archive)

Matthew A. R. Scott Sr, (born September 20, 1990) is an American former professional football quarterback. Scott was signed as an undrafted free agent by the Jacksonville Jaguars in 2013.

== Early life ==
Scott attended Centennial high school in Corona, California. His senior year, he led his football team to a 9–1 regular season record, his only loss came to Mater Dei who was led by quarterback Matt Barkley. Scott then led his team to the state championship game where they lost 31–37 to De La Salle. Before his senior season began Scott committed to Arizona. He chose Arizona over Minnesota and various other programs. He was rated a four star prospect by Rivals.com and the fifth ranked dual threat quarterback in the country. He is the youngest of four boys, three of which played quarterback at his high school, Centennial.

== College career ==
In his freshman season Scott was the backup to senior Willie Tuitama and was used mostly as a change of pace quarterback who could run the ball. In this role Scott gained 188 yards rushing averaging 8 yards per carry and scoring two touchdowns. In his limited opportunities to pass he completed 7 of his 11 attempts for 84 yards and 1 touchdown.

Scott was the starting quarterback entering the 2009 season. He got the Wildcats off to a 2–0 start in the 2009 season, however in the third game of the season against Iowa he was pulled in favor of backup Nick Foles. Scott played poorly against Iowa completing only four passes and throwing an interception for a total of 50 yards. Scott played sparingly the rest of the year. He saw some action in a blowout win against Washington State, a blowout bowl loss to Nebraska, and was used as a change of pace quarterback to run in other games. Foles however had established himself as the starting quarterback and the best option to run offensive coordinator Sonny Dykes' pass heavy offense.

Entering the 2010 season Scott was the backup quarterback to Foles following Foles' superior play after Scott's benching the previous season. In the summer before the 2010 season Scott said that he "can't stand sitting on the bench" and that he had "never been a bench warmer since Pop Warner." He also said that he was open to a possible position switch to wide receiver so that he could play. Scott got to play in the first two games of the season after Arizona had gained a sizable lead against their opponents Toledo and Citadel. After the first two games Scott did not see any action again until the Washington State game. Foles left the game with an injury that would turn out to be a dislocated knee. Scott came in and was able to fend off Washington State and secure a win. Scott would start the next two games while Foles recovered from his injury. In the two games Scott started in Foles' absence Arizona won both times beating Washington by thirty points and going to UCLA to win there. Foles came back for the next game against Stanford and Scott was relegated back to his backup role. The Wildcats concluded the season on a 5-game losing streak finishing 7–6.

During the 2011 season Scott redshirted while Foles would start every game. Foles played close to every snap and a backup quarterback was rarely used. By redshirting Scott got the opportunity to come back for a fifth season and have the possibility of starting, rather than running out of eligibility as a backup quarterback.

Rich Rodriguez was hired to be the new head coach of the Wildcats for the 2012 season. This was seen as a positive for Scott who many saw as a perfect fit for Rodriguez's spread option offense because of his speed and mobility. Scott flourished with Rodriguez as head coach. He passed for more than 3,000 yards and threw 21 touchdowns. Following an upset of Oklahoma State Arizona entered the top 25 rankings. They completed another big upset when they beat preseason favorite USC in Tucson. Scott played this game on his parents 27th anniversary and dedicated the win to them. He stated that his parents were at every game he played in and was thankful to have the family support he had during this crazy ride in Arizona. Scott's greatest statistical performance of the season came in defeat however. Against Stanford he set school and Pac-12 records for attempts and completions and passed for 491 yards against Stanford. The 491 yards is third in school history. He finished his career with a win against Nevada in the New Mexico Bowl. He engineered a 17-point fourth quarter comeback in the game, throwing for three touchdowns in the final quarter to help Arizona win 49–48.

=== Statistics ===
Season	Games		Passing								Rushing					
Season	GP	GS	Cmp	Att	Pct	Yds	TD	Int	Lng	Y/G	Att	Yds	Avg	TD	Lng	Y/G
2008	6	0	7	11	63.6	84	1	0	26	14.0	23	188	8.2	2	36	31.3
2009	9	3	41	73	56.2	441	1	3	25	49.0	41	309	7.5	0	27	34.3
2010	7	2	66	93	71.0	776	4	2	41	110.9	35	135	3.9	0	32	19.3
2011	0	0	Redshirted													
2012	12	12	301	499	60.3	3,620	27	14	63	301.7	113	506	4.5	6	24	42.2
Career	34	17	415	676	61.4	4,921	33	19	63	129.5	212	1,138	5.4	8	36	29.9

== Professional career ==
=== Jacksonville Jaguars ===
Following the 2013 NFL draft, Scott was signed as an undrafted free agent by the Jacksonville Jaguars. He was released on August 30, 2013, and signed to the team's practice squad on September 1. He was signed to the active roster at the conclusion of the 2013 regular season.

Scott was released on May 15, 2014.

=== Cincinnati Bengals ===
He was claimed off waivers by the Cincinnati Bengals the next day. The Bengals waived Scott on August 26, 2014.

=== Edmonton Eskimos ===
Scott was signed to the practice roster of the Edmonton Eskimos on October 7, 2014. He dressed for the team's final regular season game. He was released by the Eskimos on April 27, 2015.
