= Travis Wilson (American football, born 1993) =

American football player (born 1993)

No. 87
- Position: Tight end

Personal information
- Born: December 14, 1993 (age 32); San Clemente, California
- Listed height: 6 ft 7 in (2.01 m)
- Listed weight: 258 lb (117 kg)

Career information
- High school: San Clemente High School
- College: Utah
- NFL draft: 2016: undrafted

Career history
- Los Angeles Rams (2017)*
- * Offseason or practice squad member only
- Stats at Pro Football Reference

Travis James Wilson (born December 14, 1993) is an American former college football quarterback who played for the Utah Utes. He led the Utes to the most wins by a quarterback in school history. He went undrafted in 2016 and signed with the Los Angeles Rams in 2017. He tried out for the team while working at a surf shop in California.

== Early life ==
Wilson attended San Clemente High School in San Clemente, California. He set the school's record in career passing yards and total offense. As a senior, he threw for 24 touchdowns and 2,289 yards and he was a three-star recruit by Rivals and ESPN while earning a four-star rating by 247Sports. In May, 2011 Wilson committed to the University of Utah to play college football.

== Professional career ==
Pre-draft measurables
Height	Weight	Arm length	Hand span	40-yard dash	10-yard split	20-yard split	20-yard shuttle	Three-cone drill	Vertical jump	Broad jump
6 ft 7 1/4 in (2.01 m)	232 lb (105 kg)	33 1/4 in (0.84 m)	9 7/8 in (0.25 m)	4.83 s	1.69 s	2.89 s	4.25 s	7.05 s	31.5 in (0.80 m)	9 ft 4 in (2.84 m)
All values from Pro Day

Wilson went undrafted in the 2016 NFL draft. On March 2, 2017, he signed with the Los Angeles Rams as a tight end. He was waived during final roster cuts on September 3, 2017.
