= 2010 Arizona Wildcats football team =

American college football season

2010 Arizona Wildcats football

Alamo Bowl vs. Oklahoma State, L 10–36
- Conference: Pacific-10 Conference
- Record: 7–6 (4–5 Pac-10)
- Head coach: Mike Stoops (7th season)
- Offensive coordinator: Bill Bedenbaugh (1st season)
- Co-offensive coordinator: Seth Littrell (1st season)
- Offensive scheme: Air raid
- Defensive coordinator: Greg Brown (1st season)
- Co-defensive coordinator: Tim Kish (1st season)
- Base defense: 4–3
- Home stadium: Arizona Stadium

Uniform

2010 Pacific-10 Conference football standings
	Conf.			Overall
Team	W		L	W		L
No. 3 Oregon $	9	–	0	12	–	1
No. 4 Stanford %	8	–	1	12	–	1
USC †	5	–	4	8	–	5
Washington	5	–	4	7	–	6
Arizona	4	–	5	7	–	6
Arizona State	4	–	5	6	–	6
Oregon State	4	–	5	5	–	7
California	3	–	6	5	–	7
UCLA	2	–	7	4	–	8
Washington State	1	–	8	2	–	10
$ – BCS representative as conference champion; % – BCS at-large representative; † – USC ineligible for championship and post-season due to NCAA sanctions; Rankings from AP Poll

The 2010 Arizona Wildcats football team represented the University of Arizona in the college football season of 2010. The team's head coach was Mike Stoops. The Wildcats played their home games at Arizona Stadium in Tucson, Arizona. They finished with a record of 7–6 (4–5 Pac-10) and a loss to Oklahoma State in the Alamo Bowl.

== Schedule ==
Date	Time	Opponent	Rank	Site	TV	Result	Attendance
September 3	7:00 p.m.	at Toledo*		Glass Bowl; Toledo, Ohio	ESPN	W 41–2	25,907
September 11	7:00 p.m.	The Citadel*		Arizona Stadium; Tucson, Arizona	FCS	W 52–6	54,814
September 18	7:30 p.m.	No. 9 Iowa*	No. 24	Arizona Stadium; Tucson, Arizona	ESPN	W 34–27	57,864
September 25	7:00 p.m.	California	No. 14	Arizona Stadium; Tucson, Arizona	FSNAZ	W 10–9	51,906
October 9	4:00 p.m.	Oregon State	No. 9	Arizona Stadium; Tucson, Arizona	Versus	L 27–29	56,054
October 16	4:30 p.m.	at Washington State	No. 17	Martin Stadium; Pullman, Washington	Versus	W 24–7	23,955
October 23	7:15 p.m.	Washington^{†}	No. 15	Arizona Stadium; Tucson, Arizona	ESPN	W 44–14	56,244
October 30	12:30 p.m.	at UCLA	No. 15	Rose Bowl; Pasadena, California	FSN	W 29–21	53,408
November 6	5:00 p.m.	at No. 10 Stanford	No. 13	Stanford Stadium; Stanford, California	ABC	L 17–42	43,506
November 13	6:00 p.m.	USC	No. 18	Arizona Stadium; Tucson, Arizona	ABC	L 21–24	54,722
November 26	5:00 p.m.	at No. 1 Oregon	No. 20	Autzen Stadium; Eugene, Oregon	ESPN	L 29–48	59,990
December 2	6:00 p.m.	Arizona State		Arizona Stadium; Tucson, Arizona (Territorial Cup)	ESPN	L 29–30 ^{2OT}	56,253
December 29	6:15 p.m.	vs. No. 16 Oklahoma State*		Alamodome; San Antonio, Texas (Alamo Bowl)	ESPN	L 10–36	57,593
*Non-conference game; ^{†}Homecoming; Rankings from AP Poll released prior to the game; All times are in Mountain time

== Rankings ==
Ranking movements Legend: ██ Increase in ranking ██ Decrease in ranking — = Not ranked RV = Received votes
	Week															
Poll	Pre	1	2	3	4	5	6	7	8	9	10	11	12	13	14	Final
AP	RV	RV	24	14	14	9	17	15	15	13	18	23	20	RV	RV	RV
Coaches	RV	23	18	16	14	11	20	18	16	13	19	23	20	RV	RV	RV
Harris	Not released						21	18	15	13	19	23	21	25	RV	Not released
BCS	Not released							18	15	15	18	22	21	23	—	Not released

== Game summaries ==
=== at Toledo ===
Arizona Wildcats (0–0) at Toledo Rockets (0–0) – Game summary

Quarter	1	2	3	4	Total
Wildcats	7	14	7	13	41
Rockets	0	2	0	0	2

at Glass Bowl • Toledo, OH

- Date: September 3, 2010
- Game time: 5:00 p.m.
- Game weather: Partly Cloudy skies, 72 °F (22 °C)
- Game attendance: 25,907
- Referee: Anthony Cannella
- TV announcers (ESPN): Joe Tessitore (play-by-play), Rod Gilmore (analyst)

Game information

First quarter

- (8:46) ARIZ – David Douglas 9-yard pass from Nick Foles, Alex Zendejas kick (Drive: 9 plays, 68 yards, 4:09; Arizona 7–0)

Second quarter

- (9:19) TOL – Team safety (Arizona 7–2)
- (3:03) ARIZ – Nic Grigsby 36-yard run, Alex Zendejas kick (Drive: 9 plays, 91 yards, 4:17; Arizona 14–2)
- (0:17) ARIZ – Nick Foles 1-yard run, Alex Zendejas kick (Drive: 6 plays, 38 yards, 2:03; Arizona 21–2)

Third quarter

- (11:02) ARIZ – Nic Grigsby 1-yard run, Alex Zendejas kick (Drive: 10 plays, 73 yards, 3:53; Arizona 28–2)

Fourth quarter

- (13:02) ARIZ – Juron Criner 32-yard pass from Nick Foles, two-point run failed (Drive: 7 plays, 66 yards, 3:08; Arizona 34–2)
- (5:51) ARIZ – Keola Antolin 5-yard pass from Matt Scott, Alex Zendejas kick (Drive: 11 plays, 81 yards, 5:14; Arizona 41–2)

Statistics	ARIZ	TOL
First downs	25	10
Total yards	518	183
Rushes–yards	25–105	28–80
Passing yards	413	103
Passing: Comp–Att–Int	37–44–1	14–23–1
Time of possession	33:47	26:13

Team	Category	Player	Statistics
Arizona	Passing	Nick Foles	32/37, 360 yards, 2 TD, INT
Arizona	Rushing	Nic Grigsby	8 carries, 53 yards, 2 TD
Arizona	Receiving	Juron Criner	11 receptions, 187 yards, TD
Toledo	Passing	Austin Dantin	14/23, 103 yards, INT
Toledo	Rushing	Adonis Thomas	10 carries, 52 yards
Toledo	Receiving	Eric Page	4 receptions, 43 yards

=== vs The Citadel ===
The Citadel Bulldogs (1–0) vs Arizona Wildcats (1–0) – Game summary

Quarter	1	2	3	4	Total
Bulldogs	0	0	3	3	6
Wildcats	7	17	21	7	52

at Arizona Stadium • Tucson, AZ

- Date: September 11, 2010
- Game time: 7:00 p.m.
- Game weather: Scattered clouds, 90 °F (32 °C)
- Game attendance: 54,814
- Referee: Michael Batlan
- TV announcers (FCS Pacific): Dave Sitton (play-by-play), John Fina (analyst), and Glenn Howell (sideline reporter)

Game information

First quarter

- (6:23) ARIZ – Nic Grigsby 3-yard run, Alex Zendejas kick (Drive: 6 plays, 60 yards, 1:53; Arizona 7–0)

Second quarter

- (12:58) ARIZ – William Wright 4-yard pass from Nick Foles, Alex Zendejas kick (Drive: 12 plays, 84 yards, 4:32; Arizona 14–0)
- (5:53) ARIZ – Alex Zendejas 41-yard field goal (Drive: 7 plays, 40 yards, 2:25; Arizona 17–0)
- (5:13) ARIZ – Nic Grigsby 1-yard run, Alex Zendejas kick (Drive: 2 plays, 22 yards, 0:25; Arizona 24–0)

Third quarter

- (13:56) ARIZ – Nic Grigsby 62-yard run, Alex Zendejas kick (Drive: 3 plays, 71 yards, 0:49; Arizona 31–0)
- (12:23) ARIZ – Greg Nwoko 23-yard run, Alex Zendejas kick (Drive: 1 play, 23 yards, 0:08; Arizona 38–0)
- (6:55) CIT – Sam Keeler 39-yard field goal (Drive: 10 plays, 48 yards, 5:22; Arizona 38–3)
- (4:39) ARIZ – Greg Nwoko 3-yard run, Alex Zendejas kick (Drive: 6 plays, 48 yards, 2:08; Arizona 45–3)

Fourth quarter

- (9:08) CIT – Sam Keeler 23-yard field goal (Drive: 11 plays, 47 yards, 5:25; Arizona 45–6)
- (4:09) ARIZ – Jack Baucus 6-yard pass from Bryson Beirne, Alex Zendejas kick (Drive: 11 plays, 50 yards, 4:59; Arizona 52–6)

Statistics	CIT	ARIZ
First downs	10	22
Total yards	171	489
Rushes–yards	50–150	36–214
Passing yards	21	275
Passing: Comp–Att–Int	3–14–0	25–33–1
Time of possession	32:38	27:22

Team	Category	Player	Statistics
The Citadel	Passing	Matt Thompson	2/7, 12 yards
The Citadel	Rushing	Terrell Dallas	11 carries, 53 yards
The Citadel	Receiving	Domonic Jones	2 receptions, 16 yards
Arizona	Passing	Nick Foles	17/22, 214 yards, TD, INT
Arizona	Rushing	Nic Grigsby	11 carries, 107 yards, 3 TD
Arizona	Receiving	Juron Criner	2 receptions, 60 yards

=== vs No. 9 Iowa ===
No. 9 Iowa Hawkeyes (2–0) vs No. 24 Arizona Wildcats (2–0) – Game summary

Quarter	1	2	3	4	Total
No. 9 Hawkeyes	0	7	7	13	27
No. 24 Wildcats	14	13	0	7	34

at Arizona Stadium • Tucson, AZ

- Date: September 18, 2010
- Game time: 7:30 p.m.
- Game weather: Clear, 97 °F (36 °C)
- Game attendance: 57,864
- Referee: Larry Farina
- TV announcers (ESPN): Mark Jones (play-by-play), Bob Davie (analyst), and Quint Kessenich (sideline reporter)

Game information

First quarter

- (12:45) ARIZ – David Douglas 5-yard pass from Nick Foles, Alex Zendejas kick (Drive: 3 plays, 8 yards, 0:44; Arizona 7–0)
- (10:10) ARIZ – Trevin Wade 85-yard interception return, Alex Zendejas kick (Arizona 14–0)

Second quarter

- (14:50) IOWA – Jewel Hampton 4-yard pass from Ricky Stanzi, Trent Mossbrucker kick (Drive: 9 plays, 93 yards, 3:51; Arizona 14–7)
- (14:36) ARIZ – Travis Cobb 100-yard kickoff return, Alex Zendejas kick (Arizona 21–7)
- (5:42) ARIZ – Alex Zendejas 22-yard field goal (Drive: 11 plays, 76 yards, 4:24; Arizona 24–7)
- (0:16) ARIZ – Alex Zendejas 47-yard field goal (Drive: 9 plays, 51 yards, 2:46; Arizona 27–7)

Third quarter

- (7:15) IOWA – Derrell Johnson-Koulianos 37-yard pass from Ricky Stanzi, Trent Mossbrucker kick (Drive: 3 plays, 48 yards, 1:12; Arizona 27–14)

Fourth quarter

- (8:59) IOWA – Marvin McNutt 18-yard pass from Ricky Stanzi, Trent Mossbrucker kick (Drive: 1 play, 18 yards, 0:06; Arizona 27–21)
- (8:12) IOWA – Broderick Binns 20-yard interception return, kick failed (Tied 27–27)
- (3:57) ARIZ – William Wright 4-yard pass from Nick Foles, Alex Zendejas kick (Drive: 9 plays, 72 yards, 4:10; Arizona 34–27)

Statistics	IOWA	ARIZ
First downs	19	19
Total yards	307	366
Rushes–yards	26–29	30–63
Passing yards	278	303
Passing: Comp–Att–Int	18–33–1	28–39–1
Time of possession	26:46	32:08

Team	Category	Player	Statistics
Iowa	Passing	Ricky Stanzi	18/33, 278 yards, 3 TD, INT
Iowa	Rushing	Jewel Hampton	7 carries, 30 yards
Iowa	Receiving	Derrell Johnson-Koulianos	7 receptions, 114 yards, TD
Arizona	Passing	Nick Foles	28/39, 303 yards, 2 TD, INT
Arizona	Rushing	Nic Grigsby	14 carries, 27 yards
Arizona	Receiving	David Douglas	7 receptions, 74 yards, TD

=== vs California ===
California Golden Bears (2–1) vs No. 14 Arizona Wildcats (3–0) – Game summary

Quarter	1	2	3	4	Total
Golden Bears	0	6	0	3	9
No. 14 Wildcats	0	0	3	7	10

at Arizona Stadium • Tucson, AZ

- Date: September 25, 2010
- Game time: 7:00 p.m.
- Game weather: Clear, 94 °F (34 °C)
- Game attendance: 51,906
- Referee: Michael Batlan
- TV announcers (FSN Arizona): Dave Sitton (play-by-play), John Fina (analyst), and Glenn Howell (sideline reporter)

Game information

First quarter

None

Second quarter

- (13:18) CAL – Giorgio Tavecchio 25-yard field goal (Drive: 51 plays, 20 yards, 1:42; California 3–0)
- (5:23) CAL – Giorgio Tavecchio 40-yard field goal (Drive: 11 plays, 53 yards, 4:31; California 6–0)

Third quarter

- (10:16) ARIZ – Alex Zendejas 46-yard field goal (Drive: 4 plays, 0 yards, 1:43; California 6–3)

Fourth quarter

- (11:02) CAL – Giorgio Tavecchio 23-yard field goal (Drive: 9 plays, 61 yards, 4:05; California 9–3)
- (1:11) ARIZ – Juron Criner 3-yard pass from Nick Foles, Alex Zendejas kick (Drive: 7 plays, 77 yards, 1:26; Arizona 10–9)

Statistics	CAL	ARIZ
First downs	16	18
Total yards	262	311
Rushes–yards	36–146	26–99
Passing yards	116	212
Passing: Comp–Att–Int	13–27–1	25–39–1
Time of possession	32:22	27:38

Team	Category	Player	Statistics
California	Passing	Kevin Riley	13/26, 116 yards, INT
California	Rushing	Shane Vereen	27 carries, 102 yards
California	Receiving	Marvin Jones	4 receptions, 41 yards
Arizona	Passing	Nick Foles	25/39, 212 yards, TD, INT
Arizona	Rushing	Nic Grigsby	12 carries, 65 yards
Arizona	Receiving	Juron Criner	5 receptions, 68 yards, TD

=== vs Oregon State ===
Oregon State Beavers (2–2) vs No. 9 Arizona Wildcats (4–0) – Game summary

Quarter	1	2	3	4	Total
Beavers	10	7	6	6	29
No. 9 Wildcats	7	0	13	7	27

at Arizona Stadium • Tucson, AZ

- Date: October 9, 2010
- Game time: 4:00 p.m.
- Game weather: Sunny, clear, 84 °F (29 °C)
- Game attendance: 56,054
- Referee: Jack Folliard
- TV announcers (Versus): Ron Thulin (play-by-play), Glenn Parker (analyst), and Lewis Johnson (sideline reporter)

Game information

First quarter

- (11:41) OSU – James Rodgers 33-yard pass from Ryan Katz, Justin Kahut kick (Drive: 8 plays, 68 yards, 3:19; Oregon State 7–0)
- (7:34) ARIZ – Juron Criner 45-yard pass from Nick Foles, Alex Zendejas kick (Drive: 3 plays, 77 yards, 1:02; Tied 7–7)
- (1:26) OSU – Justin Kahut 23-yard field goal (Drive: 14 plays, 70 yards, 6:00; Oregon State 10–7)

Second quarter

- (9:21) OSU – Markus Wheaton 48-yard pass from Ryan Katz, Justin Kahut kick (Drive: 7 plays, 80 yards, 3:11; Oregon State 17–7)

Third quarter

- (12:54) ARIZ – Keola Antolin 33-yard run, kick failed (Drive: 5 plays, 66 yards, 2:00; Oregon State 17–13)
- (6:58) OSU – Ryan Katz 1-yard run, kick failed (Drive: 11 plays, 65 yards, 5:48; Oregon State 23–13)
- (3:20) ARIZ – Nic Grigsby 41-yard pass from Nick Foles, Alex Zendejas kick (Drive: 7 plays, 66 yards, 3:32; Oregon State 23–20)

Fourth quarter

- (5:46) OSU – Jacquizz Rodgers 1-yard run, kick failed (Drive: 10 plays, 80 yards, 4:51; Oregon State 29–20)
- (1:52) ARIZ – Keola Antolin 12-yard pass from Nick Foles, Alex Zendejas kick (Drive: 9 plays, 80 yards, 1:54; Oregon State 29–27)

Statistics	OSU	ARIZ
First downs	25	26
Total yards	486	541
Rushes–yards	35–93	19–101
Passing yards	393	440
Passing: Comp–Att–Int	30–42–1	35–46–1
Time of possession	36:23	23:37

Team	Category	Player	Statistics
Oregon State	Passing	Ryan Katz	30/42, 393 yards, 2 TD, INT
Oregon State	Rushing	Jacquizz Rodgers	25 carries, 83 yards, TD
Oregon State	Receiving	Markus Wheaton	7 receptions, 113 yards, TD
Arizona	Passing	Nick Foles	35/46, 440 yards, 3 TD, INT
Arizona	Rushing	Keola Antolin	8 carries, 70 yards, TD
Arizona	Receiving	Juron Criner	12 receptions, 179 yards, TD

=== at Washington State ===
No. 17 Arizona Wildcats (4–1) at Washington State Cougars (1–5) – Game summary

Quarter	1	2	3	4	Total
No. 17 Wildcats	7	7	7	3	24
Cougars	0	0	7	0	7

at Martin Stadium • Pullman, WA

- Date: October 16, 2010
- Game time: 4:30 p.m.
- Game attendance: 23,955
- Referee: Michael Batlan
- TV announcers (Versus): Ron Thulin (play-by-play), Glenn Parker (analyst), and Lewis Johnson (sideline reporter)

Game information

First quarter

- (4:48) ARIZ – Keola Antolin 9-yard run, Alex Zendejas kick (Drive: 6 plays, 44 yards, 2:37; Arizona 7–0)

Second quarter

- (10:59) ARIZ – Keola Antolin 1-yard run, Alex Zendejas kick (Drive: 15 plays, 95 yards, 5:44; Arizona 14–0)

Third quarter

- (13:48) ARIZ – Nic Grigsby 7-yard run, Alex Zendejas kick (Drive: 1 play, 7 yards, 0:05; Arizona 21–0)
- (3:27) WSU – Marquess Wilson 23-yard pass from Jeff Tuel, Andrew Furney kick (Drive: 9 plays, 63 yards, 2:49; Arizona 21–7)

Fourth quarter

- (11:57) ARIZ – Alex Zendejas 40-yard field goal (Drive: 6 plays, 9 yards, 2:52; Arizona 24–7)

Statistics	ARIZ	WSU
First downs	22	15
Total yards	352	297
Rushing yards	47–142	34–40
Passing yards	210	257
Passing: Comp–Att–Int	20–27–1	18–32–2
Time of possession	31:06	28:54

Team	Category	Player	Statistics
Arizona	Passing	Matt Scott	14/20, 139 yards, INT
Arizona	Rushing	Keola Antolin	21 carries, 92 yards, 2 TD
Arizona	Receiving	Travis Cobb	7 receptions, 62 yards
Washington State	Passing	Jeff Tuel	18/32, 257 yards, TD, 2 INT
Washington State	Rushing	Jeff Tuel	14 carries, 33 yards
Washington State	Receiving	Marquess Wilson	6 receptions, 131 yards, TD

=== vs Washington ===
Washington Huskies (3–3) vs No. 15 Arizona Wildcats (5–1) – Game summary

Quarter	1	2	3	4	Total
Huskies	7	7	0	0	14
No. 15 Wildcats	10	20	7	7	44

at Arizona Stadium • Tucson, AZ

- Date: October 23, 2010
- Game time: 7:15 p.m.
- Game weather: Clear, 65 °F (18 °C)
- Game attendance: 56,244
- Referee: Jack Wood
- TV announcers (ESPN): Carter Blackburn (play-by-play), Brock Huard (analyst), and Mike Bellotti (sideline reporter)

Game information

First quarter

- (11:33) WASH – Jermaine Kearse 26-yard pass from Jake Locker, Erik Folk kick (Drive: 4 plays, 62 yards, 1:34; Washington 7–0)
- (9:20) ARIZ – David Roberts 17-yard pass from Matt Scott, Alex Zendejas kick (Drive: 7 plays, 62 yards, 2:05; Tied 7–7)
- (4:42) ARIZ – Alex Zendejas 29-yard field goal (Drive: 8 plays, 56 yards, 3:10; Arizona 10–7)

Second quarter

- (10:48) ARIZ – Keola Antolin 1-yard run, Alex Zendejas kick (Drive: 10 plays, 92 yards, 4:55; Arizona 17–7)
- (7:55) WASH – Chris Polk 7-yard run, Erik Folk kick (Drive: 7 plays, 55 yards, 2:46; Arizona 17–14)
- (7:37) ARIZ – Keola Antolin 78-yard run, Alex Zendejas kick (Drive: 1 play, 78 yards, 0:12; Arizona 24–14)
- (1:54) ARIZ – Nic Grigsby 4-yard run, kick failed (Drive: 8 plays, 54 yards, 3:38; Arizona 30–14)

Third quarter

- (10:09) ARIZ – Nic Grigsby 4-yard run, Alex Zendejas kick (Drive: 6 plays, 26 yards, 3:29; Arizona 37–14)

Fourth quarter

- (11:09) ARIZ – Juron Criner 21-yard pass from Matt Scott, Alex Zendejas kick (Drive: 8 plays, 75 yards, 4:02; Arizona 44–14)

Statistics	WASH	ARIZ
First downs	19	23
Total yards	290	467
Rushes–yards	33–98	43–234
Passing yards	192	233
Passing: Comp–Att–Int	18–33–0	18–22–0
Time of possession	28:46	31:14

Team	Category	Player	Statistics
Washington	Passing	Jake Locker	17/29, 183 yards, TD
Washington	Rushing	Chris Polk	14 carries, 65 yards, TD
Washington	Receiving	D'Andre Goodwin	5 receptions, 51 yards
Arizona	Passing	Matt Scott	18/22, 233 yards, 2 TD
Arizona	Rushing	Keola Antolin	14 carries, 114 yards, 2 TD
Arizona	Receiving	Juron Criner	8 receptions, 108 yards, TD

Matt Scott, the junior quarterback from Corona, California, led the 15th-ranked Wildcats to an offensive bonanza and 44-14 win over the visiting Washington Huskies at Arizona Stadium. Scott had help, of course. Arizona tailbacks Nicolas Grigsby and Keola Antolin scored two touchdowns apiece in the first three quarters, before a sellout crowd of 56,244 on Arizona's homecoming night. Scott had no trouble replacing the injured starting quarterback, Nick Foles, and Arizona easily handled up-and-down Washington. Arizona (6-1, 3-1 Pac-10) overcame occasionally poor tackling with a balanced offense and by harassing Jake Locker into an ineffective game. Washington (3-4, 2-2) continued its season-long, win-one, lose-one pattern, following last week's thrilling double-overtime victory over then-No. 24 Oregon State with a defensive clunker. The inexperienced Scott outplayed Locker, widely viewed as one of the top quarterbacks in the country. Washington's senior quarterback completed just 11 of 19 first-half passes for 139 yards and a score. Known for his game-changing speed, Locker was held without a rush in the first half; he lost 24 yards on six carries before being replaced by Keith Price early in the fourth quarter. In the AP Top 25 poll released October 24, Arizona retained its No. 15 ranking despite the victory.

=== at UCLA ===
No. 15 Arizona Wildcats (6–1) at UCLA Bruins (3–4) – Game summary

Quarter	1	2	3	4	Total
No. 15 Wildcats	7	12	7	3	29
Bruins	7	0	7	7	21

at Rose Bowl • Pasadena, CA

- Date: October 30, 2010
- Game time: 12:30 p.m.
- Game weather: Partly Cloudy, 70 °F (21 °C)
- Game attendance: 53,408
- Referee: Jack Folliard
- TV announcers (Fox Sports Network): Barry Tompkins (play-by-play), Petros Papadakis (analyst), Rebecca Haarlow (sideline reporter)

Game information

First quarter

- (11:24) ARIZ – David Douglas 41-yard pass from Matt Scott, Alex Zendejas kick (Drive: 8 plays, 80 yards, 3:36; Arizona 7–0)
- (7:24) UCLA – Derrick Coleman 11-yard run, Kai Forbath kick (Drive: 8 plays, 45 yards, 3:52; Tied 7–7)

Second quarter

- (14:18) ARIZ – Keola Antolin 2-yard run, kick failed (Drive: 11 plays, 85 yards, 5:05; Arizona 13–7)
- (8:21) ARIZ – Alex Zendejas 42-yard field goal (Drive: 11 plays, 44 yards, 4:58; Arizona 16–7)
- (0:00) ARIZ – Alex Zendejas 24-yard field goal (Drive: 12 plays, 74 yards, 2:25; Arizona 19–7)

Third quarter

- (13:31) UCLA – Randall Carroll 68-yard pass from Richard Brehaut, Kai Forbath kick (Drive: 4 plays, 79 yards, 1:24; Arizona 19–14)
- (6:45) ARIZ – Greg Nwoko 1-yard run, Alex Zendejas kick (Drive: 13 plays, 80 yards, 6:46; Arizona 26–14)

Fourth quarter

- (14:24) UCLA – Josh Smith 49-yard pass from Richard Brehaut, Alex Zendejas kick (Drive: 8 plays, 86 yards, 3:20; Arizona 26–21)
- (1:18) ARIZ – Alex Zendejas 30-yard field goal (Drive: 4 plays, 6 yards, 0:59; Arizona 29–21)

Statistics	ARIZ	UCLA
First downs	32	15
Total yards	583	299
Rushes–yards	52–264	28–71
Passing yards	319	228
Passing: Comp–Att–Int	24–36–1	13–27–1
Time of possession	37:55	22:05

Team	Category	Player	Statistics
Arizona	Passing	Matt Scott	24/36, 319 yards, TD, INT
Arizona	Rushing	Keola Antolin	23 carries, 111 yards, TD
Arizona	Receiving	Juron Criner	8 receptions, 127 yards, TD
UCLA	Passing	Richard Brehaut	13/27, 228 yards, 2 TD, INT
UCLA	Rushing	Johnathan Franklin	13 carries, 44 yards
UCLA	Receiving	Randall Carroll	3 receptions, 90 yards, TD

Arizona held off UCLA 29-21; the Wildcats rolled up a season-high 583 yards and 32 first downs and held the Bruins to 299 yards and 15 first downs. Matt Scott had another big game in the absence of Nick Foles, completing 24 of 36 passes for a career-high 319 yards with one touchdown and one interception and rushing for another 71 yards on 12 carries. RB Keola Antolin rushed for 111 yards on 23 carries for the Wildcats (7-1, 4-1 Pac-10), off to their best start since winning seven of their first eight games en route to a 12-1 finish in 1998. Coach Mike Stoops shocked the Bruins by calling a fake punt on fourth-and-3 from the Arizona 27 with 6:23 remaining and the Wildcats leading 26-21. Jake Fischer ran for 29 yards to give the Wildcats a big first down. The play enabled the Wildcats to eat up some time before having to punt. The Bruins turned the ball over on downs, putting the Wildcats in position for Alex Zendejas' third field goal of the game, a 30-yarder. UCLA's final chance ended when Brooks Reed sacked UCLA quarterback Richard Brehaut and caused a fumble, which Sione Tuihalamaka recovered with 48 seconds left. Brehaut passed for a career-best 228 yards and two touchdowns for the Bruins (3-5, 1-4), who lost their third straight game but performed much better than in their last two, when they were outscored 95-20 at California and Oregon. But Arizona did enough for its fourth straight road victory dating to last season, keeping them alive for their first-ever berth in the Rose Bowl. With the win, the 'Cats improved to No. 13 in the AP Top 25 poll released October 31.

=== at No. 10 Stanford ===
No. 13 Arizona Wildcats (7–1) at No. 10 Stanford Cardinal (7–1) – Game summary

Quarter	1	2	3	4	Total
No. 13 Wildcats	0	3	7	7	17
No. 10 Cardinal	7	14	14	7	42

at Stanford Stadium • Stanford, CA

- Date: November 6, 2010
- Game time: 5:00 p.m.
- Game weather: Sunny/Clear, 65 °F (18 °C)
- Game attendance: 43,506
- Referee: Jack Wood
- TV announcers (ABC): Brent Musburger (play-by-play), Kirk Herbstreit (analyst), Erin Andrews (sideline reporter)

Game information

First quarter

- (12:06) STAN – Chris Owusu 45-yard pass from Andrew Luck, Nate Whitaker kick (Drive: 6 plays, 69 yards, 2:54; Stanford 7–0)

Second quarter

- (11:43) STAN – Stepfan Taylor 2-yard run, Nate Whitaker kick (Drive: 14 plays, 89 yards, 7:45; Stanford 14–0)
- (5:55) ARIZ – Alex Zendejas 33-yard field goal (Drive: 5 plays, 27 yards, 1:41; Stanford 14–73)
- (1:18) STAN – Stepfan Taylor 5-yard run, Nate Whitaker kick (Drive: 5 plays, 35 yards, 1:19; Stanford 21–3)

Third quarter

- (7:16) STAN – Tyler Gaffney 5-yard pass from Andrew Luck, Nate Whitaker kick (Drive: 10 plays, 75 yards, 4:29; Stanford 28–3)
- (5:45) ARIZ – Juron Criner 7-yard pass from Nick Foles, Alex Zendejas kick (Drive: 8 plays, 65 yards, 1:26; Stanford 28–10)
- (1:24) STAN – Stepfan Taylor 1-yard run, Nate Whitaker kick (Drive: 10 plays, 78 yards, 4:16; Stanford 35–10)

Fourth quarter

- (9:02) ARIZ – Keola Antolin 1-yard run, Alex Zendejas kick (Drive: 14 plays, 63 yards, 2:57; Stanford 35–17)
- (3:23) STAN – Stepfan Taylor 5-yard run, Nate Whitaker kick (Drive: 11 plays, 83 yards, 5:31; Stanford 42–17)

Statistics	ARIZ	STAN
First downs	25	26
Total yards	428	510
Rushes–yards	31–180	45–217
Passing yards	248	293
Passing: Comp–Att–Int	28–48–1	23–32–0
Time of possession	22:57	37:03

Team	Category	Player	Statistics
Arizona	Passing	Nick Foles	28/48, 248 yards, TD, INT
Arizona	Rushing	Keola Antolin	16 carries, 86 yards, TD
Arizona	Receiving	Juron Criner	9 receptions, 98 yards, TD
Stanford	Passing	Andrew Luck	23/32, 293 yards, 2 TD
Stanford	Rushing	Stepfan Taylor	19 carries, 82 yards, 4 TD
Stanford	Receiving	Chris Owusu	9 receptions, 165 yards, TD

=== vs USC ===
USC Trojans (6–3) vs No. 18 Arizona Wildcats (7–2) – Game summary

Quarter	1	2	3	4	Total
Trojans	14	7	3	0	24
No. 18 Wildcats	0	14	0	7	21

at Arizona Stadium • Tucson, AZ

- Date: November 13, 2010
- Game time: 6:00 p.m.
- Game weather: Clear, 69 °F (21 °C)
- Game attendance: 54,722
- Referee: Larry Farina
- TV announcers (ABC): Ron Franklin (play-by-play), Ed Cunningham (analyst), and Shelley Smith (sideline reporter)

Game information

First quarter

- (4:13) USC – Matt Barkley 1-yard run, Joe Houston kick (Drive: 10 plays, 80 yards, 4:37; USC 7–0)
- (1:34) USC – Rhett Ellison 7-yard pass from Matt Barkley, Joe Houston kick (Drive: 3 plays, 22 yards, 0:47; USC 14–0)

Second quarter

- (12:50) ARIZ – David Douglas 5-yard pass from Nick Foles, Alex Zendejas kick (Drive: 9 plays, 80 yards, 3:44; USC 14–7)
- (3:43) USC – Marc Tyler 3-yard run, Joe Houston kick (Drive: 17 plays, 66 yards, 8:57; USC 21–7)
- (1:24) ARIZ – Travis Cobb 31-yard pass from Nick Foles, Alex Zendejas kick (Drive: 9 plays, 80 yards, 2:14; USC 21–14)

Third quarter

- (3:35) USC – Joe Houston 30-yard field goal (Drive: 15 plays, 72 yards, 6:48; USC 24–14)

Fourth quarter

- (1:01) ARIZ – David Douglas 11-yard pass from Nick Foles, Alex Zendejas kick (Drive: 9 plays, 85 yards, 1:09; USC 24–21)

Statistics	USC	ARIZ
First downs	24	24
Total yards	382	404
Rushes–yards	46–205	18–51
Passing yards	177	353
Passing: Comp–Att–Int	22–36–1	32–48–0
Time of possession	37:27	22:33

Team	Category	Player	Statistics
USC	Passing	Matt Barkley	21/35, 170 yards, TD, INT
USC	Rushing	Marc Tyler	31 carries, 160 yards, TD
USC	Receiving	Robert Woods	8 receptions, 41 yards
Arizona	Passing	Nick Foles	32/48, 353 yards, 3 TD
Arizona	Rushing	Keola Antolin	10 carries, 38 yards
Arizona	Receiving	Terrence Miller	7 receptions, 116 yards

=== at No. 1 Oregon ===
No. 21 Arizona Wildcats (7–3) at No. 1 Oregon Ducks (10–0) – Game summary

Quarter	1	2	3	4	Total
No. 21 Wildcats	14	5	3	7	29
No. 1 Ducks	7	7	20	14	48

at Autzen Stadium • Eugene, OR

- Date: November 6, 2010
- Game time: 5:00 p.m.
- Game weather: Light Rain, 48 °F (9 °C)
- Game attendance: 59,990
- Referee: Michael Batlan
- TV announcers (ESPN): Brad Nessler (play-by-play), Todd Blackledge (analyst), Holly Rowe (sideline reporter)

Game information

First quarter

- (4:47) ARIZ – Juron Criner 8-yard pass from Nick Foles, Alex Zendejas kick (Drive: 16 plays, 60 yards, 7:42; Arizona 7–0)
- (3:12) ORE – David Paulson 38-yard pass from Darron Thomas, Rob Beard kick (Drive: 4 plays, 56 yards, 1:35; Tied 7–7)
- (2:51) ARIZ – Juron Criner 85-yard pass from Nick Foles, Alex Zendejas kick (Drive: 1 play, 85 yards, 0:21; Arizona 14–7)

Second quarter

- (14:04) ORE – Jeff Maehl 6-yard pass from Darron Thomas, Rob Beard kick (Drive: 10 plays, 53 yards, 3:47; Tied 14–14)
- (9:56) ARIZ – Team safety (Arizona 16–14)
- (0:04) ARIZ – Alex Zendejas 29-yard field goal (Drive: 13 plays, 80 yards, 5:35; Arizona 19–14)

Third quarter

- (13:30) ORE – Josh Huff 85-yard run, two-point pass failed (Drive: 2 plays, 85 yards, 0:19; Oregon 20–19)
- (4:44) ORE – Darron Thomas 20-yard run, Rob Beard kick (Drive: 19 plays, 99 yards, 6:07; Oregon 27–19)
- (2:46) ARIZ – Alex Zendejas 41-yard field goal (Drive: 7 plays, 50 yards, 1:58; Oregon 27–22)
- (0:36) ORE – D.J. Davis 6-yard pass from Darron Thomas, Rob Beard kick (Drive: 6 plays, 75 yards, 2:10; Oregon 34–22)

Fourth quarter

- (12:46) ORE – LaMichael James 13-yard run, Rob Beard kick (Drive: 5 plays, 35 yards, 1:31; Oregon 41–22)
- (12:15) ORE – LaMichael James 1-yard run, Rob Beard kick (Drive: 2 plays, 8 yards, 0:21; Oregon 48–22)
- (10:45) ARIZ – David Roberts 32-yard pass from Nick Foles, Alex Zendejas kick (Drive: 6 plays, 81 yards, 1:30; Oregon 48–29)

Statistics	ARIZ	ORE
First downs	28	27
Total yards	506	537
Rushes–yards	27–58	57–389
Passing yards	448	148
Passing: Comp–Att–Int	29–54–1	14–24–1
Time of possession	29:27	30:33

Team	Category	Player	Statistics
Arizona	Passing	Nick Foles	29/54, 448 yards, 3 TD, INT
Arizona	Rushing	Nic Grigsby	16 carries, 44 yards
Arizona	Receiving	Juron Criner	3 receptions, 109 yards, 2 TD
Oregon	Passing	Darron Thomas	14/24, 148 yards, 3 TD, INT
Oregon	Rushing	LaMichael James	28 carries, 126 yards, 2 TD
Oregon	Receiving	David Paulson	3 receptions, 48 yards, TD

=== vs Arizona State ===
Arizona State Sun Devils (5–6) vs Arizona Wildcats (7–4) – Game summary

Quarter	1	2	3	4	OT	2OT	Total
Sun Devils	3	3	0	14	3	7	30
Wildcats	0	0	14	6	3	6	29

at Arizona Stadium • Tucson, AZ

- Date: December 2, 2010
- Game time: 6:00 p.m.
- Game weather: Clear, 70 °F (21 °C)
- Game attendance: 56,253
- Referee: Jack Wood
- TV announcers (ESPN): Chris Fowler (play-by-play), Kirk Herbstreit (analyst), and Erin Andrews (sideline reporter)

Game information

First quarter

- (2:13) ASU – Thomas Weber 52-yard field goal (Drive: 7 plays, 15 yards, 1:39; Arizona State 3–0)

Second quarter

- (0:03) ASU – Thomas Weber 36-yard field goal (Drive: 15 plays, 72 yards, 5:01; Arizona State 6–0)

Third quarter

- (9:32) ARIZ – Juron Criner 28-yard pass from Nick Foles, Alex Zendejas kick (Drive: 8 plays, 91 yards, 3:11; Arizona 7–6)
- (2:01) ARIZ – Juron Criner 52-yard pass from Nick Foles, Alex Zendejas kick (Drive: 3 plays, 63 yards, 1:09; Arizona 14–6)

Fourth quarter

- (14:21) ASU – Thomas Weber 38-yard field goal (Drive: 7 plays, 62 yards, 2:35; Arizona 14–9)
- (7:09) ASU – Mike Willie 3-yard pass from Brock Osweiler, Brock Osweiler two-point pass to Kerry Taylor (Drive: 12 plays, 51 yards, 5:29; Arizona State 17–14)
- (2:59) ASU – Thomas Weber 40-yard field goal (Drive: 5 plays, 7 yards, 2:52; Arizona State 20–14)
- (0:27) ARIZ – David Douglas 5-yard pass from Nick Foles, kick failed (Drive: 10 plays, 57 yards, 2:24; Tied 20–20)

First overtime

- ARIZ – Alex Zendejas 19-yard field goal (Drive: 10 plays, 23 yards; Arizona 23–20)
- ASU – Thomas Weber 40-yard field goal (Drive: 4 plays, 2 yards; Tied 23–23)

Second overtime

- ASU – Cameron Marshall 2-yard run, Thomas Weber kick (Drive: 4 plays, 25 yards; Arizona State 30–23)
- ARIZ – David Douglas 9-yard run, kick failed (Drive: 5 plays, 25 yards; Arizona State 30–29)

Statistics	ASU	ARIZ
First downs	19	19
Total yards	389	391
Rushes–yards	43–122	43–125
Passing yards	267	266
Passing: Comp–Att–Int	22–49–0	24–38–0
Time of possession	33:00	27:00

Team	Category	Player	Statistics
Arizona State	Passing	Brock Osweiler	22/49, 267 yards, TD
Arizona State	Rushing	Cameron Marshall	23 carries, 63 yards, TD
Arizona State	Receiving	Kerry Taylor	6 receptions, 112 yards
Arizona	Passing	Nick Foles	22/36, 262 yards, 3 TD
Arizona	Rushing	Keola Antolin	25 carries, 83 yards
Arizona	Receiving	Juron Criner	6 receptions, 95 yards, 2 TD

=== vs No. 16 Oklahoma State (Alamo Bowl) ===
Arizona Wildcats (7–5) vs No. 16 Oklahoma State Cowboys (10–2) – Game summary
(2010 Valero Alamo Bowl)

Quarter	1	2	3	4	Total
Wildcats	7	0	3	0	10
No. 16 Cowboys	17	6	10	3	36

at Alamodome • San Antonio, TX

- Date: December 29, 2010
- Game time: 7:30 p.m.
- Game weather: None (indoor stadium)
- Game attendance: 57,593
- Referee: David Smith
- TV announcers (ESPN): Rece Davis (play-by-play), Jesse Palmer (analyst), Craig James (analyst), Jenn Brown (sideline reporter)

Game information

First quarter

- (10:55) OKST – Jeremy Smith 6-yard run, Dan Bailey kick (Drive: 6 plays, 26 yards, 1:47; Oklahoma State 7–0)
- (8:46) OKST – Justin Blackmon 71-yard pass from Brandon Weeden, Dan Bailey kick (Drive: 1 play, 71 yards, 0:12; Oklahoma State 14–0)
- (5:41) ARIZ – Juron Criner 5-yard pass from Nick Foles, Alex Zendejas kick (Drive: 8 plays, 63 yards, 3:05; Oklahoma State 14–7)
- (0:06) OKST – Dan Bailey 40-yard field goal (Drive: 9 plays, 30 yards, 2:33; Oklahoma State 17–7)

Second quarter

- (12:33) OKST – Markelle Martin 62-yard interception return, kick failed (Oklahoma State 23–7)

Third quarter

- (9:01) ARIZ – Alex Zendejas 42-yard field goal (Drive: 6 plays, 35 yards, 2:45; Oklahoma State 23–10)
- (5:16) OKST – Justin Blackmon 3-yard pass from Brandon Weeden, Dan Bailey kick (Drive: 11 plays, 71 yards, 3:45; Oklahoma State 30–10)
- (3:20) OKST – Dan Bailey 50-yard field goal (Drive: 8 plays, 24 yards, 1:40; Oklahoma State 33–10)

Fourth quarter

- (5:53) OKST – Dan Bailey 44-yard field goal (Drive: 10 plays, 53 yards, 4:42; Oklahoma State 36–10)

Statistics	ARIZ	OKST
First downs	25	17
Total yards	370	312
Rushing yards	38–90	20–72
Passing yards	280	240
Passing: Comp–Att–Int	32–50–3	25–41–0
Time of possession	37:31	22:29

Team	Category	Player	Statistics
Arizona	Passing	Nick Foles	32/50, 280 yards, TD, 3 INT
Arizona	Rushing	Nic Grigsby	16 carries, 59 yards
Arizona	Receiving	David Douglas	6 receptions, 91 yards
Oklahoma State	Passing	Brandon Weeden	25/41, 240 yards, 2 TD
Oklahoma State	Rushing	Kendall Hunter	10 carries, 32 yards
Oklahoma State	Receiving	Justin Blackmon	9 receptions, 117 yards, 2 TD

Wide receiver Justin Blackmon was named Offensive MVP.

Defensive back Markelle Martin was named Defensive MVP.

Wide receiver David Douglas was named the Fred Jacoby Sportsmanship Award winner.
