= Kevin and Bean =

Former KROQ-FM Radio Show

The Kevin & Bean Show
- Other names: Kevin and Bean
- Genre: Comedy, Variety
- Country of origin: United States
- Home station: KROQ-FM
- Hosted by: Kevin Ryder; Gene "Bean" Baxter; Allie Mac Kay; Ralph Garman
- Starring: See § Cast
- Created by: Kevin Ryder; Gene Baxter
- Produced by: Jay Tilles; Dave Sanchez
- Original release: January 2, 1990 – November 7, 2019
- Website: kroq.radio.com/shows/kevin-bean
- Podcast: kroq.radio.com/media/podcast/kevin-bean-show-kroq

Kevin and Bean was the morning show on KROQ-FM, an alternative rock-format radio station in Los Angeles, California. It was hosted by Kevin Ryder and Gene "Bean" Baxter. The show was on the air from 1990 to 2019 and interspersed music and news with comedy, celebrity interviews, listener call-ins, and live music performances.

Baxter announced his departure from the show in early 2019, with his last show being November 7 of that year. The show continued on with new episodes and Baxter's nickname in its title until January 2, 2020, when the short-lived spin-off morning show Kevin in the Morning debuted. Just over 10 weeks later on March 17, 2020, the spin-off was cancelled with all cast and crew fired, effective the following day. Ryder returned to KROQ in 2025, hosting afternoons.

== History ==
The show debuted on KROQ on December 31, 1989, when it hosted the annual countdown of the year's best songs.

On November 10, 2008, the Kevin and Bean Show started an afternoon segment, "Cinco De La Tarde" weekdays from 5-6 p.m. As of August 3, 2009, this segment has been discontinued and the morning show has been restored to its original 10:00 AM end time. A Best of Kevin and Bean show called "Same Shit, Different Day" was added on Saturday mornings airing from 7:00-10:00 am.

On May 11, 2009, Kevin and Bean began syndicating on KEDJ, 103.9 The Edge in Phoenix, Arizona, KFRR 104.1 Fresno and KRZQ-FM Reno. The show is also available as a podcast on iTunes.

In February 2015 the Kevin and Bean show let go of long-time contributors, Lisa May and Boyd R. Britton (Doc on the ROQ). May started as a traffic reporter on the program and had grown to become a key contributor of the Kevin and Bean Show during her 24 years with the program, while Doc had been providing the news for 27 years. Kevin and Bean explained that management had made it clear audiences were not tuning in to KROQ for traffic or news, so the painful decision was made to make changes to the show. Allie Mac Kay later joined the show to help fill the role lost by the exit of May.

On April 14, 2015, Kevin and Bean were inducted into the National Association of Broadcasters Hall of Fame during a ceremony hosted by NAB President (and former Oregon Senator) Gordon Smith. Bean said, "We are happy to share the recognition with our great team who works just as hard as we do to make the show successful." The three-day NAB trade show is held every April at Las Vegas Convention Center.

On March 6, 2019, declaring "Thirty years is a good time to stop," Bean announced that he would leave the show before the end of the year and move to England. His last day on the air was November 7, 2019.

On March 18, 2020, Kevin Ryder announced on Twitter that he and the other personalities on "Kevin in the Mornings With Allie & Jensen" had been fired.

== Format ==
=== Opening segments ===
Each episode opens with an audio montage (usually created by Baxter) featuring musical and audio clips that draw from current events in politics, pop-culture, and the news. An overview of the day's show is also given, as well as any small talk about the cast's day-to-day lives.

=== Hourly segments ===
Music from the standard lineup of KROQ-FM is played regularly during the program.

=== Recurring segments ===
Many of the show's periodically recurring segments are based on listener participation and involve the hosts taking calls on a discussion topic or for a guest, or involve games and contests created around promotional giveaways. Ryder and Baxter will also occasionally read emails sent to them, and play messages from the show's voice mail service, known as the "Afro Line". Other segments focus on the hosts and their personalities and quirks, like "Thanks for That Info, Bean", which pokes fun at Baxter's intense interest in seemingly trivial topics, and "A Moment with...", where a humorous audio clip of a statement made on-air by a host is replayed. "Would You Like to Take That Back?" is another feature during which the hosts give each other the option of "taking back" an unsuccessful or poorly delivered joke or pun.

There are several other segments that frequently happen on the show. "Bean Makes Us Guess" is when Baxter finds a list from the internet and has the rest of the crew guess the top 10 (such as the Top baby names of 2018). Ryder often does not take the game seriously and makes nonsense guesses. Another segment hosted by Baxter is "What's up with Florida?", where Baxter brings bizarre stories from the state of Florida. Ryder hosts a similar segment, called "People are Dumb", where he brings in stories of people making questionable choices. A weekly Thursday segment is hosted by Karp, called "Get Up on This" (based on his former podcast), where he gets people up on things that people might not know about that he thinks people should.

Several segments feature regular guests, including sports updates from both of the Petros and Money Show with Matt "Money" Smith (former Kevin and Bean Show sports reporter) and Petros Papadakis. Since January 2010, Dr. Drew Pinsky, whose syndicated radio program Loveline was broadcast by KROQ, has also appeared frequently on the program.

The show also features a listener call-in segment on Friday's called "Keep it 100", where listeners can text in to request a song from the station's catalog to play on the air. The 100th caller gets to have their song played on the air. Baxter often presents some facts about the song, and Mac Kay tries to guess the year.

=== Closing segments ===
The program generally ends with a short preview of the next show, and on Fridays the show closes (and opens) with a cover of "Don't Bogart Me" by Robert Bradley's Blackwater Surprise (a song first performed by the band Fraternity of Man), as performed by the hosts.

== Cast ==
=== Kevin ===
Kevin was born Kevin Beyeler in Phoenix, Arizona on March 29, 1962. He was married to Melissa Beyeler until they separated in 2017. Kevin and Melissa run the Friends and Helpers Foundation, based out of Encino, California. They have twin daughters. Kevin has since married actress Merrin Dungey.

In January 2021, Kevin began hosting "Great News with Kevin and Mike" with former "Kevin and Bean" producer and former Loveline co-host Mike Catherwood. The YouTube series derives from a weekly "Kevin and Bean" segment.

From February 2021 to September 2024, Kevin co-hosted the "Kevin & Sluggo" afternoon drive show on KLOS with former KROQ DJ Doug "Sluggo" Roberts. In February 2025, Kevin and Sluggo started a podcast called "3/4 Human," initially co-hosted by Marci Wiser and later replaced by Kat Corbett.

On April 1, 2025, Ryder returned to KROQ as afternoon host.

=== Bean ===
Baxter was born in London on November 14, 1959, and resided until his early teens in Bingley, Bradford, West Yorkshire, England. He graduated from Bowie High School in Bowie, Maryland, in 1977, and speaks with an American accent. He claims to suffer from memory loss, due to a childhood injury sustained from a car accident.

He is married to Donna H. (Mendivil) Baxter, who works as a fashion designer.

After moving from L.A. to Seattle (and later, New Orleans) Bean continued with the show by broadcasting from a room in his house where he had a sound mixing board, recording equipment, a video monitor showing staff in the KROQ studio in Los Angeles, a computer and a microphone attached to a high-quality phone line.

Baxter currently resides in the United Kingdom. He hosts a fee-based podcast on Patreon with Allie Mac Kay, "A Cup of Tea and a Chat." He also contributes to UK-based Podcast Radio and guest-hosted from England The John and Ken Show on KFI in December 2020.

=== Other cast members and staff ===
Also on the show at the time it ended were:

- Allie Mac Kay co-hosted the program and, along with Ryder and Baxter, was present for nearly all on-air segments. In addition to regular on-air commentary during call-ins and interviews, she occasionally participated in pre-recorded segments and regularly filled in on the Show Biz Beat. A former features reporter with the Los Angeles-based KTLA Morning News team and occasional contributor to the Kevin and Bean Show, she joined the show as a full-time cast member in February 2015.
- Dave "The King of Mexico" Sanchez was the show's producer, who was given the nickname 'King Of Mexico' because even though his parents are both Mexican and fluent in Spanish, he can't speak a word of it. He is a Los Angeles Clippers fan and composes songs extolling the team. When the Clippers fell short of the playoffs in the 2006-2007 season, he was teased for his boasting, including a mocking song submitted by a listener.
- Jensen Karp was the most recent co-host on the program. He joined the show on October 11, 2018, and served a similar role to former member Ralph Garman.
- "Beer Mug" got his nickname from a beer mug tattoo on his foot. He helped Kevin and Bean in studio on air, running the soundboard. A recurring segment involved sending him to red carpet Hollywood premieres where he failed miserably at interviewing stars.
- Omar Khan AKA "DJ Omar" was the show's main DJ and mostly responsible for its technical aspects. He created many of the jingles for various segments, which were mostly existing songs with alternate lyrics. Khan directed the low-budget film Cucamonga Heat, often referred to on the show, while in school. After being featured in the show, a clip from the film featuring a man (played by Khan) sitting down in a chair and ordering a fake drug deal would often be played during instances where a movie clip should have been played, usually as a joke or to signify that the film being reviewed was bad. This also led to anyone named "Eric" to be greeted by "Yea, Eric" when calling in. Every few months, Khan would make a parody of a popular song, often inserting clips of embarrassing on-air mistakes by Kevin and Bean.

=== Former cast members ===
Personalities no longer with the show include:

- Adam Carolla was Mr. Birchum the woodshop teacher from 1995 to 1997.
- Frank Murphy was the show's producer from 1993 to 1996.
- Jay "Lightning" Tilles - former producer (promoted from another production position after Murphy left the show), so nicknamed ironically because of his slowness.
- Jimmy Kimmel was "Jimmy the Sports Guy" from 1994 to 1999, when he left to co-star in "The Man Show" with Adam Carolla.
- Lisa May was the traffic reporter from 1990 to 2015. A running joke on the show involved Kevin and Bean trying to offer other women her job. Every year for Christmas and May's birthday, Kevin and Bean would call QVC and purchase whatever was being sold on television at that moment as her gift, regardless of the price or usefulness of the product. On May 11, 2015, Lisa May joined the morning radio program "The Heidi and Frank Show" on 95.5 KLOS FM.
- Matt "Money" Smith was the sports commentator after Jimmy Kimmel. Matt left the Kevin and Bean show in 2006, but occasionally still called in for sports segments.
- "Michael The Maintenance Man" Burton was an actual maintenance man in the building where KROQ had its studios who came to be an active member of the show, performing man-on-the-street interviews and making public appearances. In the fall of 1995, Burton left the show and filed a wrongful-termination suit charging the station, along with Kevin and Bean, with racial and religious discrimination. The suit was settled in late 1996.
- "Psycho" Mike Catherwood started as a board operator for the show, but over the years became a regular on-air contributor to the show, mainly doing character voices and impersonations. Mike left in 2010 to co-host "Loveline" with Dr. Drew Pinsky.
- Ralph Garman was an impressionist and contributor from 1999 to 2017. He handled entertainment news segments and often acted as a substitute when Kevin or Bean were not present. His segment "Ralph's Showbiz Beat" was one of the features on the show. On November 30, 2017, Garman announced it would be his last show. The reasons for his departure were not included in his emotional goodbye, other than that it was not his choice to leave.
- "Big Tad" Newcomb was an intern made to do embarrassing stunts and ridiculed for his lack of intellect.
- Doc on the ROQ was a news reporter who broadcast hourly. He was terminated at the same time as Lisa May.

== The B-Team Podcast ==
Current and former members of the Kevin and Bean show, including Lightning, Omar and Dave started a podcast documenting the behind-the-scenes look at the show in July 2017. Each week they look back at different bits, or moments in the show's history and help to retell the happenings of the Kevin and Bean show over the years. They also take listener feedback from emails to help address questions people have about the show.

== "Confess Your Crime" Hoax ==
In June 1990, Kevin and Bean secretly arranged for a friend to pretend to confess to killing his girlfriend during their "Confess Your Crime" segment. The hoax resulted in investigations by the Sheriff's Department, the FCC, NBC's "Unsolved Mysteries" and other news media. The hoax was exposed 10 months later after KROQ had unknowingly hired the caller, Doug "the Slug" Roberts, as a DJ and the three were heard talking about the hoax on a monitored phone line at KROQ. Kevin and Bean paid the Sheriff's Department $12,170 for the cost of the investigation, and performed 149 hours of community service to compensate for the 149 hours the homicide detective spent on the case. KROQ received a letter of reprimand from the FCC for the incident; the lightest punishment the FCC could give.

== See also ==
- Kevin and Bean's Christmastime in the LBC, their 1996 compilation album
