= Matt "Money" Smith =

American sports radio personality (born 1973)

Matt "Money" Smith (born August 28, 1973) is an American sports radio personality, including the radio voice play-by-play announcer for the Los Angeles Chargers.

== Biography ==
Smith graduated from Morgan Park Academy in Chicago in 1991. He attended Pepperdine University, graduating in 1995 with a double-major in political science and speech communication.

In 1995, Smith joined the program Kevin and Bean on KROQ-FM in Los Angeles. He was given the nickname "Money" when working with the show. From 2005 to 2009, he hosted the Los Angeles Lakers pregame, halftime and post-game shows (Lakers Zone) on AM 570.

On 8 January 2007 Smith began co-hosting the Petros and Money Show, with Petros Papadakis.

On 6 June 2017 Smith was named lead play-by-play announcer for the radio broadcasts of the Los Angeles Chargers on KFI.

Smith has 2 siblings. His brothers Kevin and Brandon still reside in the Midwest.
