= Kevin and Bean's Christmastime in the LBC =

Kevin and Bean: Christmastime in the LBC

Compilation album by various artists
- Released: 1996
- Recorded: Various
- Genre: Christmas music
- Label: KROQ

Kevin and Bean chronology
Kevin and Bean: How the Stole Christmas (1995)	Kevin and Bean: Christmastime in the LBC (1996)	Kevin and Bean: A Family Christmas in Your Ass (1997)

Christmastime in the LBC is the seventh Christmas album released by KROQ-FM show Kevin and Bean. The album was released only on audio cassette, and was the very last of the Kevin and Bean Christmas albums to be released on that format. The album is currently out of print and has not been reissued on CD as of February 2021.

== Track listing ==
Side One

1. Kevin and Bean: "Introduction"
2. Jimmy Kimmel (in the style of Snoop Dogg): "Christmastime in the LBC" - 3:40
3. Reel Big Fish: "Christmas Medley"
4. Big Tad: "Jingle Bells"
5. Better Than Ezra: "Egg Nog Singalong"
6. Adam Carolla: "Mr. Birchum's Gift Guide" - 3:38
7. Local H: "Disgruntled Christmas"
8. Beck & Dust Brothers: "Little Drum Machine Boy"
9. "Chris Carter Christmas"
10. Cocteau Twins: "Frosty the Snowman"
11. Voodoo Glow Skulls: "Feliz Navidad"

Side Two

1. Adam Sandler: "The Chanukah Song"
2. Jimmy Kimmel (as Jimmy the Sports Guy): "Jimmy's Wish"
3. Goldfinger: "White Christmas"
4. Poe: "Grandma Got Run Over by a Reindeer"
5. Bobcat Goldthwait: "Fuck the Police"
6. Korn: "Christmas Song"
7. Adam Carolla and Dr. Drew: "Bethlehem Calling"
8. Everclear: "Santa Baby" - 3:58
9. Squirrel Nut Zippers: "Santa Claus is Smoking Reefer"
10. Kevin and Bean: "Heartfelt Holiday Greetings from the Kevin and Bean Morning Show"
