= Nick Foles =

American football player (born 1989)

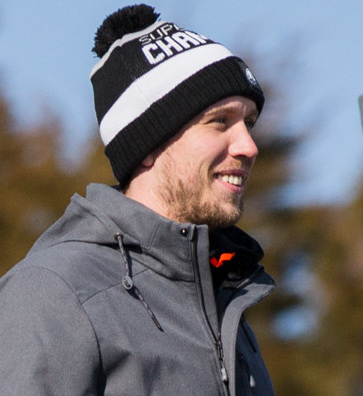
- Foles at the Eagles Super Bowl LII parade in 2018

No. 9, 5, 4, 7
- Position: Quarterback

Personal information
- Born: January 20, 1989 (age 37); Austin, Texas, U.S.
- Listed height: 6 ft 6 in (1.98 m)
- Listed weight: 243 lb (110 kg)

Career information
- High school: Westlake (Austin)
- College: Michigan State (2007); Arizona (2008–2011)
- NFL draft: 2012: 3rd round, 88th overall pick

Career history
- Philadelphia Eagles (2012–2014); St. Louis Rams (2015); Kansas City Chiefs (2016); Philadelphia Eagles (2017–2018); Jacksonville Jaguars (2019); Chicago Bears (2020–2021); Indianapolis Colts (2022)

Awards and highlights
- Super Bowl champion (LII); Super Bowl MVP (LII); Pro Bowl (2013); NFL passer rating leader (2013); NFL records: 7 touchdown passes in a game (tied); 25 consecutive pass completions (tied by Philip Rivers & Ryan Tannehill); Playoff career completion percentage: 68.1%

Career NFL statistics
- Passing attempts: 2,087
- Passing completions: 1,302
- Completion percentage: 62.4%
- TD–INT: 82–47
- Passing yards: 14,227
- Passer rating: 86.2
- Stats at Pro Football Reference

Nicholas Edward Foles (born January 20, 1989) is an American former professional football quarterback who played in the National Football League (NFL) for 11 seasons. A member of six teams, he achieved his greatest success with the Philadelphia Eagles, leading them to the franchise's first Super Bowl title.

Foles played college football for the Arizona Wildcats and was selected by the Eagles in the third round of the 2012 NFL draft. He had a breakout season in 2013 when he set the NFL season record for the best touchdown–interception ratio and led the Eagles to a division title, earning him Pro Bowl honors. Foles was traded to the St. Louis Rams after being unable to duplicate his success the following year and struggled during his one season. He spent the 2016 season as a backup with the Kansas City Chiefs.

Foles returned to the Eagles in 2017 as Carson Wentz's backup, but was promoted to starter when Wentz was injured near the end of the season. He led the Eagles throughout their playoff run, which culminated with a victory in Super Bowl LII and him earning the game's MVP award. Initially returning to his backup role in 2018, Foles guided Philadelphia on another postseason run after Wentz was again lost to injury. Foles opted out of his contract with the Eagles to join the Jacksonville Jaguars in 2019, but suffered an injury during the season opener that caused him to miss most of the year. He played his last three seasons as a backup and starter with the Chicago Bears and Indianapolis Colts.

== Early life ==
Foles was born and raised in Austin, Texas, the son of restaurateurs Larry and Melissa Foles. He graduated from Westlake High School in 2007.

A two-year starter for the football team, Foles threw for 5,658 yards and 56 touchdowns, breaking most school records previously held by Foles' future NFL opponent, Drew Brees.

Foles also excelled at basketball, where he started three years, twice received team MVP honors, and was recruited by Georgetown, Baylor, and Texas. Foles also played high school football with Justin Tucker, a former kicker for the Baltimore Ravens, and Kyle Adams, a former tight end for the Tampa Bay Buccaneers and Chicago Bears.

Foles originally committed to Arizona State, but later decided to attend Michigan State. He ultimately transferred to the University of Arizona.

== College career ==
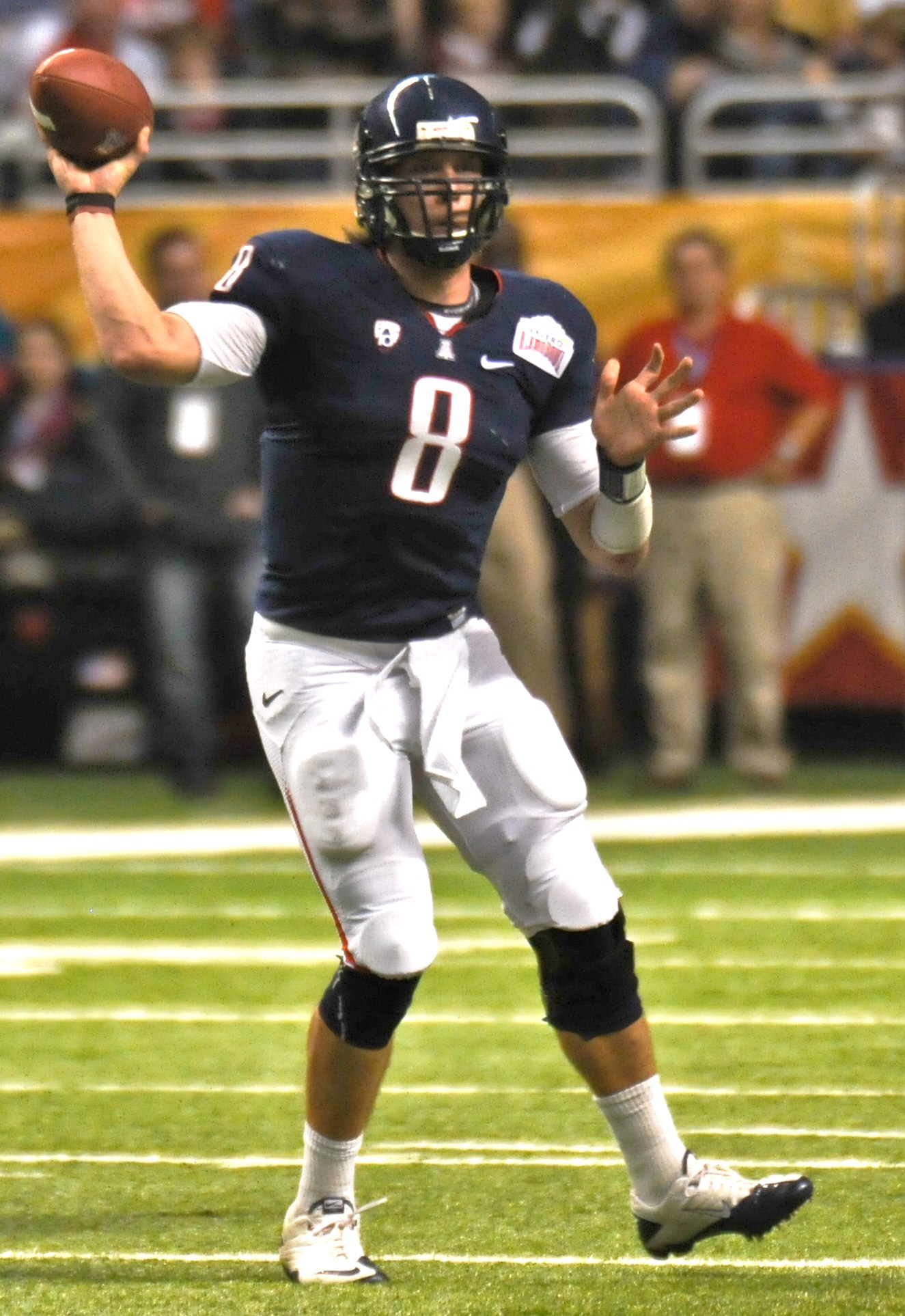
Foles at the Alamo Bowl in December 2010

Foles attended Michigan State for one year. He appeared in a game against UAB, completing five of eight passes for 57 yards.

After a year at Michigan State, Foles transferred to the University of Arizona and had to redshirt his 2008 freshman season.

After quarterback Willie Tuitama graduated, Foles competed with expected successor Matt Scott, who got the nod after spring practice because the coaches believed he could run effectively as well as pass. Despite victories against Central Michigan and Northern Arizona, Scott struggled against Iowa and the next week was benched in favor of Foles. In Corvallis, Foles led the Wildcats to a victory against Oregon State. He started the rest of the season, completing 260 of 409 passes for 2,486 yards, 19 touchdowns, and nine interceptions.

As a redshirt junior in 2010, Foles was the unquestioned starter. Foles led the Wildcats to a 7–1 start, including a victory against #9 Iowa on national television. Foles led the game-winning drive that ended with a touchdown pass to Bug Wright. A knee injury in the Washington State game sidelined him for two games, but Foles finished off his junior year with 3,191 passing yards, 20 touchdowns, and 10 interceptions.

During the 2011 season, Foles completed 387 of 560 passes for 4,334 yards, 28 touchdowns, and 14 interceptions. He ranked first in the Pac-12 Conference and fifth among all NCAA Division I FBS players with an average of 352.58 yards of total offense per game. Foles also ranked second in the Pac-12 and 20th among all FBS players in total passing yardage.

Foles graduated from the University of Arizona with a degree in communications.

== Professional career ==
Pre-draft measurables
Height	Weight	Arm length	Hand span	Wingspan	40-yard dash	10-yard split	20-yard split	20-yard shuttle	Three-cone drill	Vertical jump	Broad jump	Wonderlic
6 ft 5 in (1.96 m)	243 lb (110 kg)	34 1/4 in (0.87 m)	10 5/8 in (0.27 m)	6 ft 8 3/4 in (2.05 m)	4.99 s	1.79 s	2.90 s	4.68 s	7.14 s	33.5 in (0.85 m)	9 ft 4 in (2.84 m)	29
All values from NFL Combine/Pro Day

=== Philadelphia Eagles (first stint) ===
==== 2012 season ====
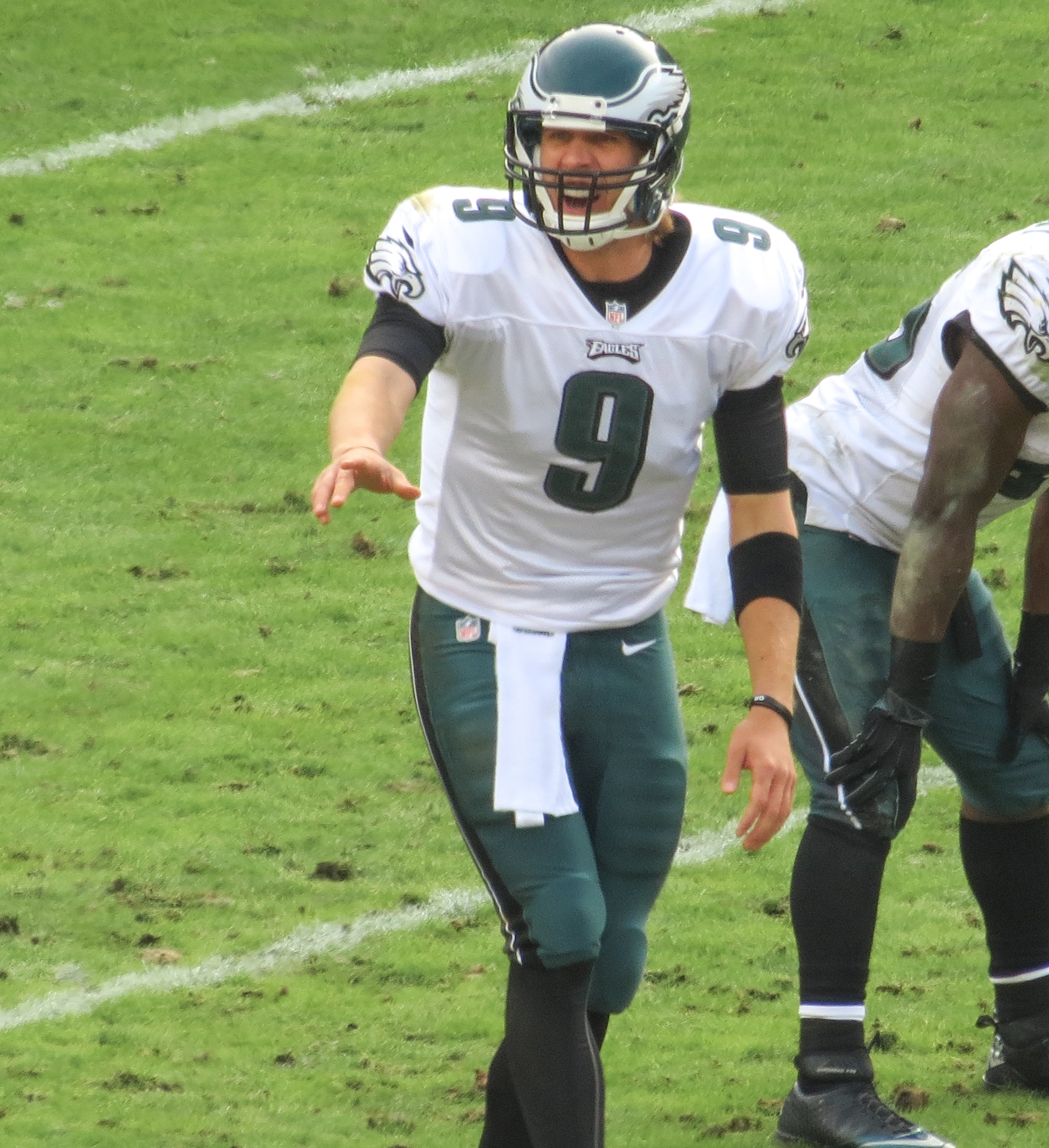
Foles with the Eagles in 2012

Foles was selected by the Philadelphia Eagles in the third round (88th overall) in the 2012 NFL draft. He signed a four-year contract with the team on May 21, 2012.

Despite speculation that Foles would start the Eagles' Monday Night Football game against the New Orleans Saints in Week 9, Eagles coach Andy Reid stated that Michael Vick would start that game. The following week against the division rival Dallas Cowboys, after Vick left the game in the second quarter with concussion symptoms, Foles made his NFL debut. Foles threw his first career touchdown pass to wide receiver Jeremy Maclin for 44 yards and finished with 22 completed passes out of 32 attempts for 219 yards, a touchdown, and an interception. With Philadelphia behind 31–23 in the last minute, Foles lost the ball as he was sacked, and Jason Hatcher of the Cowboys recovered the ball in the end zone for a touchdown. Vick was eventually ruled out of the following game against the Washington Redskins in Week 11, and Foles made his first career start. Philadelphia lost to the Redskins 31–6, and Foles completed 21-for-47 passes for 204 yards with no touchdowns and two interceptions.

On December 3, 2012, Eagles coach Andy Reid announced that Foles would start for the rest of the year, regardless of when Vick returned from a concussion. During Week 14, Foles earned his first win as a starter in a narrow 23–21 victory over the Tampa Bay Buccaneers. With two seconds remaining on the clock and Philadelphia down 21–16 at the Bucs' one-yard line, Foles threw a one-yard pass to Jeremy Maclin for the game-winning touchdown as time expired. He finished the game with 381 passing yards and two touchdowns, both coming in the final four minutes, to go along with 27 rushing yards and a touchdown. On December 23, Foles broke his hand against the Redskins, and was replaced by Vick in the season finale against the New York Giants. Three days later, Foles was placed on injured reserve.

==== 2013 season ====
Going into training camp, new head coach Chip Kelly announced that Foles would compete with Vick and newly drafted rookie Matt Barkley for the Eagles starting quarterback job in the 2013 season. Going into preseason, it became clear that the job was a two-way battle between Foles and Vick. Foles played average during preseason while Vick excelled past him. On August 20, it was announced that Vick would start the season and Foles would be the backup.

Foles saw his first game in action during a Week 4 loss against the Denver Broncos. He completed 3 out of 4 attempted passes for 49 yards and a touchdown, with no interceptions.

During Week 5, Foles entered the game against the New York Giants in the second quarter, after Vick suffered a hamstring injury. Foles completed 16 of 25 passes for 197 yards and two touchdowns, leading the Eagles to a 36–21 road victory over the Giants. Later in the week, it was announced that Foles would get the start in Week 6 against the 0–4 Tampa Bay Buccaneers, after Vick was declared unable to start due to his injury. Foles had one of the best starts of his career, completing 22 of 31 passes for 296 yards and four total touchdowns (three passing, one rushing) in the 31–20 victory, a performance that earned him NFC Offensive Player of the Week.

On October 15, Vick announced that he needed another week of rehab before he was able to start again, making Foles the starter for the Week 7 matchup against the Dallas Cowboys for the division lead. However, against the Cowboys, Foles completed only 11 of 29 passes for 80 yards, with no touchdowns. In that same game, Foles left in the fourth quarter after suffering a head injury, and was replaced by rookie Matt Barkley. Barkley did not perform well either, throwing three interceptions. The Eagles went on to lose 17–3 to the Cowboys thus dropping to 3–4 on the season and one game out of first place. The next day, Foles was diagnosed with a concussion and ruled out of any participation in the Week 8 matchup against the Giants on medical grounds.

Foles was given his third start of the season for the Week 9 matchup against the Oakland Raiders. Foles threw for seven touchdowns, tying a record held by six other quarterbacks (held by eight quarterbacks as of 2020). He is one of three quarterbacks to throw seven touchdowns and no interceptions. Foles also amassed a perfect passer rating (158.3), having thrown more touchdown passes than incompletions. He was awarded his second NFC Offensive Player of the Week Award of the season for his performance.

During Week 10, Foles played in his sixth game of the season (four starts) against the Green Bay Packers. Coming into the game, the Eagles had lost to the Packers on the last three occasions the teams had met (including post season). Foles completed 12 of 18 passes for 228 yards, three touchdowns, and no interceptions. His passer rating was extremely high for the second consecutive week, finishing at 149.3 and becoming the first quarterback in NFL history to post passer ratings above 149 in consecutive weeks. Foles carried eight times during the game, including a 16 yard long run, finishing the game with 38 yards total and a fumble lost. The Eagles won the game 27–13 and moved to 5–5.

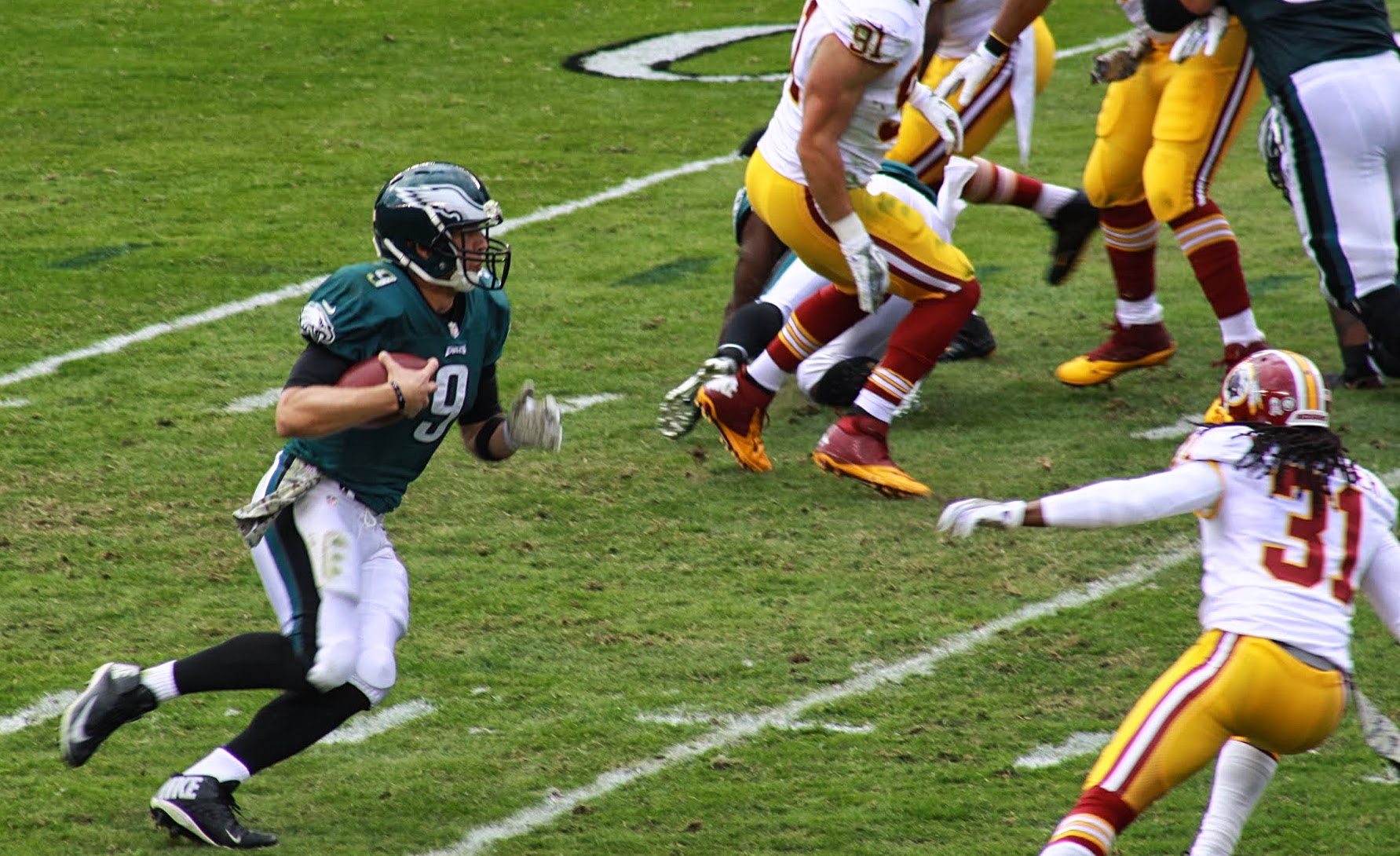
Foles during a four-yard touchdown run during a 24–16 victory over the Redskins on November 17, 2013

Foles continued as the starting quarterback in Week 11 of the regular season against the Washington Redskins at home. For the sixth time this season, Foles’ passer rating eclipsed 100, as he completed 17 of 26 passes for 298 yards with no touchdowns and no interceptions while also rushing nine times for 47 yards and a touchdown. He led the Eagles to a 24–0 lead at the end of the third quarter, before a comeback from the Redskins meant the game finished 24–16. The win moved the Eagles to an overall record of 6–5–0 and first position in the NFC East. The Eagles had not won at Lincoln Financial Field in 413 days since defeating the Giants on September 30, 2012; ending a streak of 10 consecutive home defeats. Foles was named the NFC Player of the Month for his play during the month of November.

Following a Week 12 bye, the Eagles faced the Arizona Cardinals. Following their bye week, the Eagles had slipped into second place in the divisional standings behind fierce rivals the Cowboys. Foles was named as the starting quarterback for the remainder of the season, a decision which Vick (who began the year as the number one quarterback) fully agreed with.

For the seventh time this season, Foles' passer rating eclipsed 100, as he completed 21 of 34 passes for 237 yards, three touchdowns, and no interceptions. He also rushed nine times for 22 yards and fumbled on one occasion, although this was recovered by his teammates – and did not result in a turnover. Following a closely contested game, the Eagles held on to win 24–21 despite a fourth quarter comeback by Carson Palmer. Foles set a team record for most passes without an interception (233), breaking Michael Vick's mark of 224 set in 2010. He also moved within one touchdown pass of the record 20 straight touchdown passes set by Peyton Manning and zero interceptions to start a season before throwing an interception in a blizzard game in Philadelphia against the Detroit Lions in which the Eagles won 34–20. The win took the Eagles to an overall record of 8–5 and surpassed Dallas for the number one spot in the NFC East. The following week in Minnesota, the team's five game winning streak was snapped with a loss. However, Foles again had another impressive game with yet another passer rating over 100 and three more touchdowns and only his second interception of the season. The following week, the Eagles defeated the Chicago Bears 54–11, which saw another passer rating over 100 and a completion of 84.0% of his passes, a career-high. Foles helped lead the Eagles to their first NFC East division title in three years by beating the Cowboys in the regular season finale. Foles had his ninth game with a passer rating over 100.

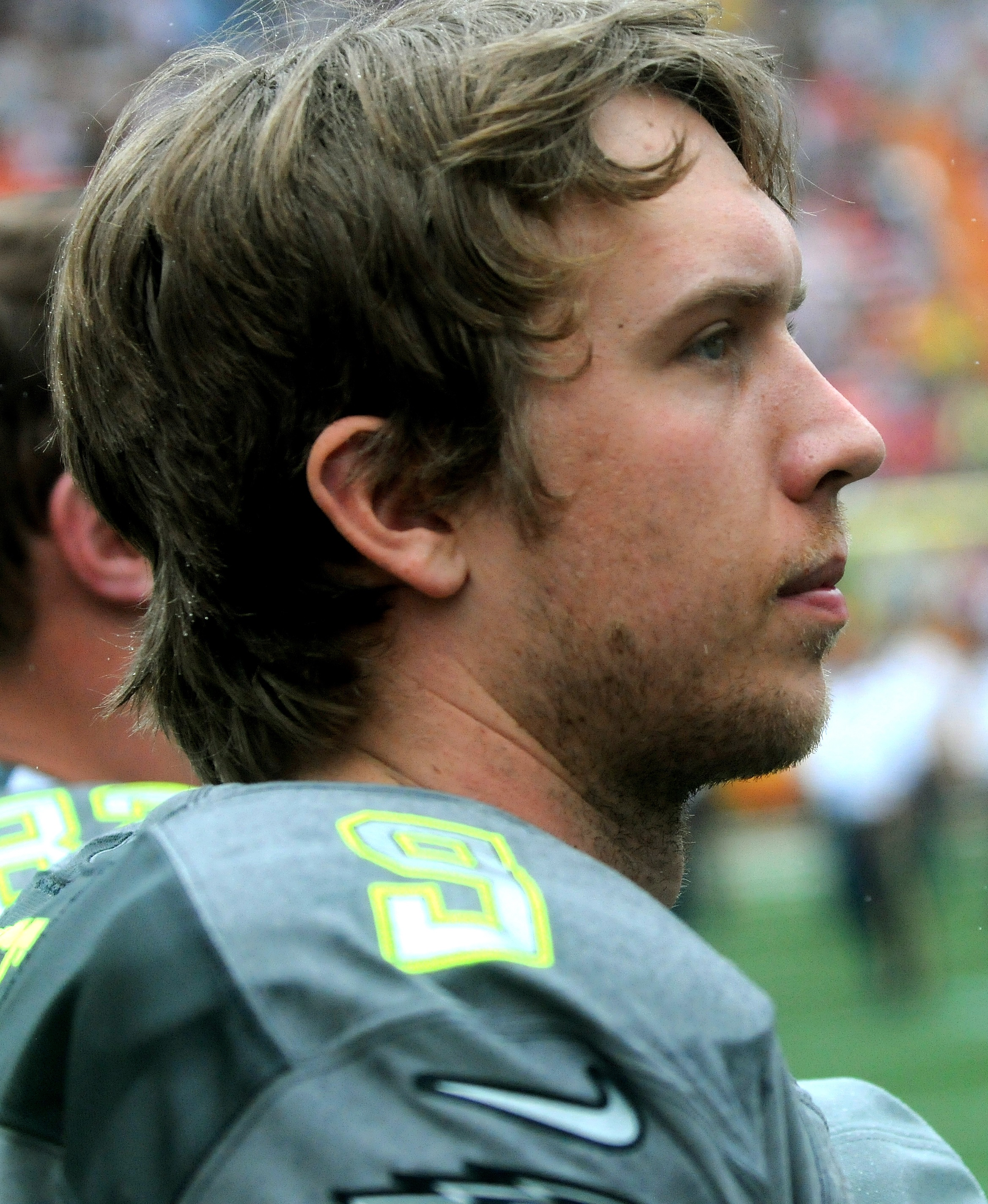
Foles at the 2014 Pro Bowl

Foles finished the 2013 regular season with 2,891 passing yards, 27 touchdowns, and only two interceptions, just behind Tom Brady's 2016 record of 28 touchdown passes and two interceptions for the best TD-INT ratio in NFL history, and a season leading 119.0 passer rating and third in NFL history trailing only to Aaron Rodgers' 122.5 rating in 2011 and Peyton Manning's 121.1 rating in 2004. Foles led the Eagles to a playoff berth, their first since 2010. Hosting the New Orleans Saints in the playoffs at Lincoln Financial Field, the Eagles lost on a last-minute field goal as the game ended at 26–24. Foles threw for 195 yards, two touchdowns, and no interceptions for a passer rating of 105.0 in his postseason debut. Foles was awarded the "NFL Greatness on the Road" award for his seven touchdown, perfect game performance against the Oakland Raiders during a road game in 2013. When including postseason games, Foles maintains the single season record for TD-INT ratio at 14.5–1, which he achieved by posting 27 touchdowns in the 2013 regular season and two touchdown passes in the 2013 postseason along with a total of just two interceptions.

Foles was also assigned to the 2014 Pro Bowl as an alternate and was drafted by Team Sanders. Despite losing the game, Foles went 7 for 10 for 89 yards and a go-ahead touchdown. He won the Pro Bowl Offensive MVP award, which included a new GMC truck.

==== 2014 season ====
Going into 2014, Chip Kelly had released Foles' top receiver, DeSean Jackson, but Jeremy Maclin, who had good chemistry with Foles in 2012, returned from an ACL tear and had a career season, gaining 702 yards and six touchdowns with Foles as quarterback, finishing with 1,318 yards and ten scores. He was also aided by rookie receiver Jordan Matthews, second year tight end Zach Ertz, and veteran running back Darren Sproles.

Foles and the Eagles kicked off their 2014 season with a Week 1 home matchup against the Jacksonville Jaguars. Foles started the game poorly, losing two fumbles and throwing an interception in the first half. Foles only lost two fumbles and threw two interceptions the entire 2013 season. The Eagles defense also performed poorly, as they trailed 17–0 after the first half. However, the Eagles roared back in the second half, scoring 34 unanswered points to win 34–17. Overall, Foles completed 24 of 45 passes for 332 yards and two touchdowns, along with the three turnovers.

During Week 2, Foles led the Eagles to a 30–27 victory over the Colts after trailing by as much as 20–6 early in the third quarter. He finished the game with 331 passing yards, a touchdown, and an interception. The following week, Foles played his best game of the season in a 37–34 win over the division rival Washington Redskins. Foles fought off the slow starts of games past, a strong Washington defensive front seven, and a brutal blindside hit from Washington defensive lineman Chris Baker which resulted in a major brawl between both teams and causing Eagles left tackle Jason Peters, the strongest player in their line, and Baker to be ejected from the game. Foles finished the game completing 66 percent of his passes, going for 325 yards and three touchdowns.

During Week 8, Foles set a franchise record for most completions in a game with 36 and threw a career-high 62 times in a close loss to the Arizona Cardinals, finishing with 411 passing yards and two touchdowns. The following week against the Houston Texans, Foles left the game during the first half with a broken collarbone, which led to Foles being put on injured reserve, ending his 2014 season. Mark Sanchez finished out the season as the Eagles starting quarterback.

After a league-best 27–2 TD-INT ratio in 2013, Foles finished the 2014 season with 2,163 yards in eight games, and a 13–10 TD-INT ratio. He also fumbled 4 times, only recovering it once. Foles led the team to a 6–2 record as starter, first place in the NFC East and second place in the NFC at the time of his injury. However, the team would finish 4–4 without Foles and missed the playoffs.

=== St. Louis Rams ===
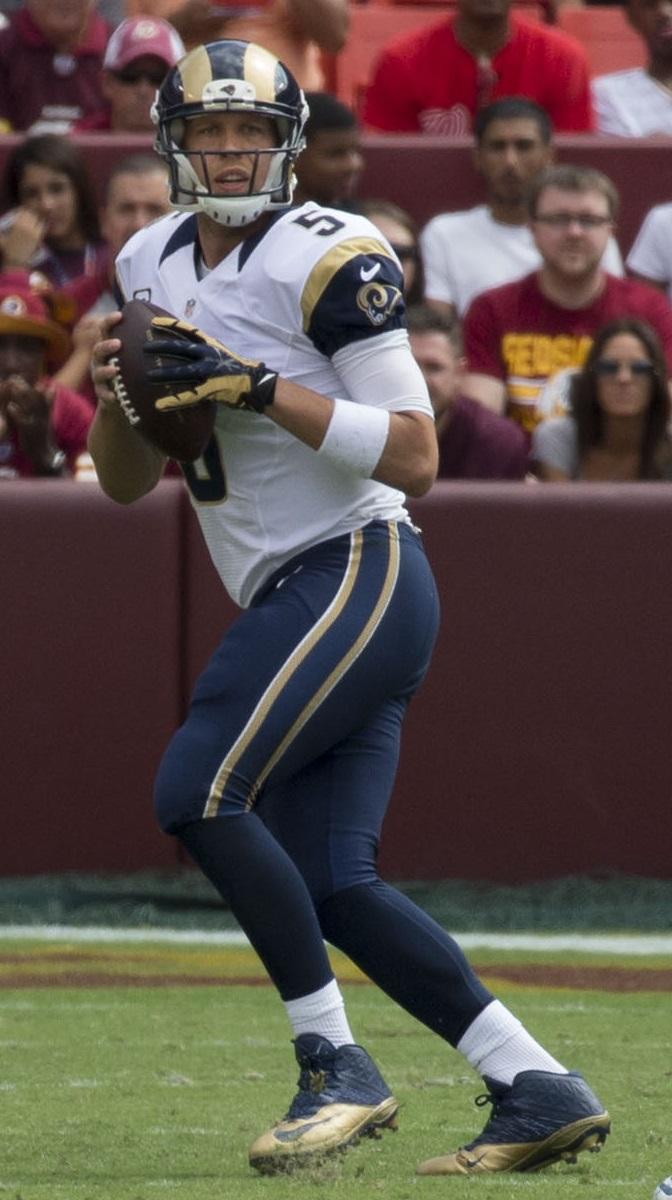
Foles with the St. Louis Rams in 2015

On March 10, 2015, the Eagles traded Foles, a 2015 fourth-round pick, and a 2016 second-round pick to the St. Louis Rams in exchange for Sam Bradford and a 2015 fifth-round pick. Foles signed a two-year, $24.5 million extension with the Rams on August 7.

Foles' first game with the team came against the division rival Seattle Seahawks, who had the league's No. 1 defense in 2013 and 2014. Foles completed 18 for 27 passes for 297 yards, and his lone passing touchdown came with 53 seconds left, bringing the game into overtime. He also ran for 11 yards and a touchdown, which put the Rams in the lead in the middle of the second quarter. In overtime, Foles threw a 22-yard pass to wide receiver Stedman Bailey, which set up the Rams' game-winning field goal over the defending NFC Champions.

Following the dramatic win, Foles struggled against his former divisional rival, the Washington Redskins. Although he did not turn the ball over, Foles only completed 17 of 32 passes for 150 yards and the Rams lone touchdown as they lost 24–10. His accuracy improved the following week, going 19 of 28 for 197 yards, but he threw no touchdowns and his first interception as a Ram against the Pittsburgh Steelers, and the Rams dropped to 1–2. Following the two losses, Foles bounced back, going 16 of 24 for two touchdowns and no turnovers to hand the 3–0 Arizona Cardinals their first loss of the season. After that game, Foles' problems with turnovers from 2014 started to show, as he completed 11 passes out of 30 for 141 yards, a touchdown, and a career-high four interceptions against the Green Bay Packers.

On November 16, Foles was benched in favor of Case Keenum. He won his starting job back two weeks later after Keenum was out with a concussion, but his struggles worsened. In a loss against the Cincinnati Bengals, Foles went 30–46 for 228 yards (his second highest total of the year) and three interceptions, and followed it up by going 15/35 for 146 yards and an interception in a 27–3 loss to the Arizona Cardinals. Foles was again benched after Keenum returned from his concussion.

Upset that the now-Los Angeles Rams drafted quarterback Jared Goff as the first overall pick of the 2016 NFL draft, Foles requested and was granted a release on July 27, 2016.

=== Kansas City Chiefs ===
After reportedly contemplating retirement after his rough season with the Rams, Foles signed with the Kansas City Chiefs on August 3, 2016. It was a one-year deal worth $1.75 million and included a second-year option for 2017, worth between $6.75 million and $16 million depending on his performance during the Chiefs' 2016 season.

During Week 8 at Indianapolis Colts after Alex Smith left the game with a concussion, Foles took over for the remainder of the game, and finished with 223 yards and two touchdowns. The Chiefs announced that Foles would start in Week 9 against the Jacksonville Jaguars as Smith was still recovering from injury. Foles won the game over the Jaguars, 19–14, and finished 20–33 with 187 yards and a touchdown. The next day, Smith was announced to start Week 10.

On March 9, 2017, the Chiefs declined a second-year option on his contract, making him a free agent.

=== Philadelphia Eagles (second stint) ===
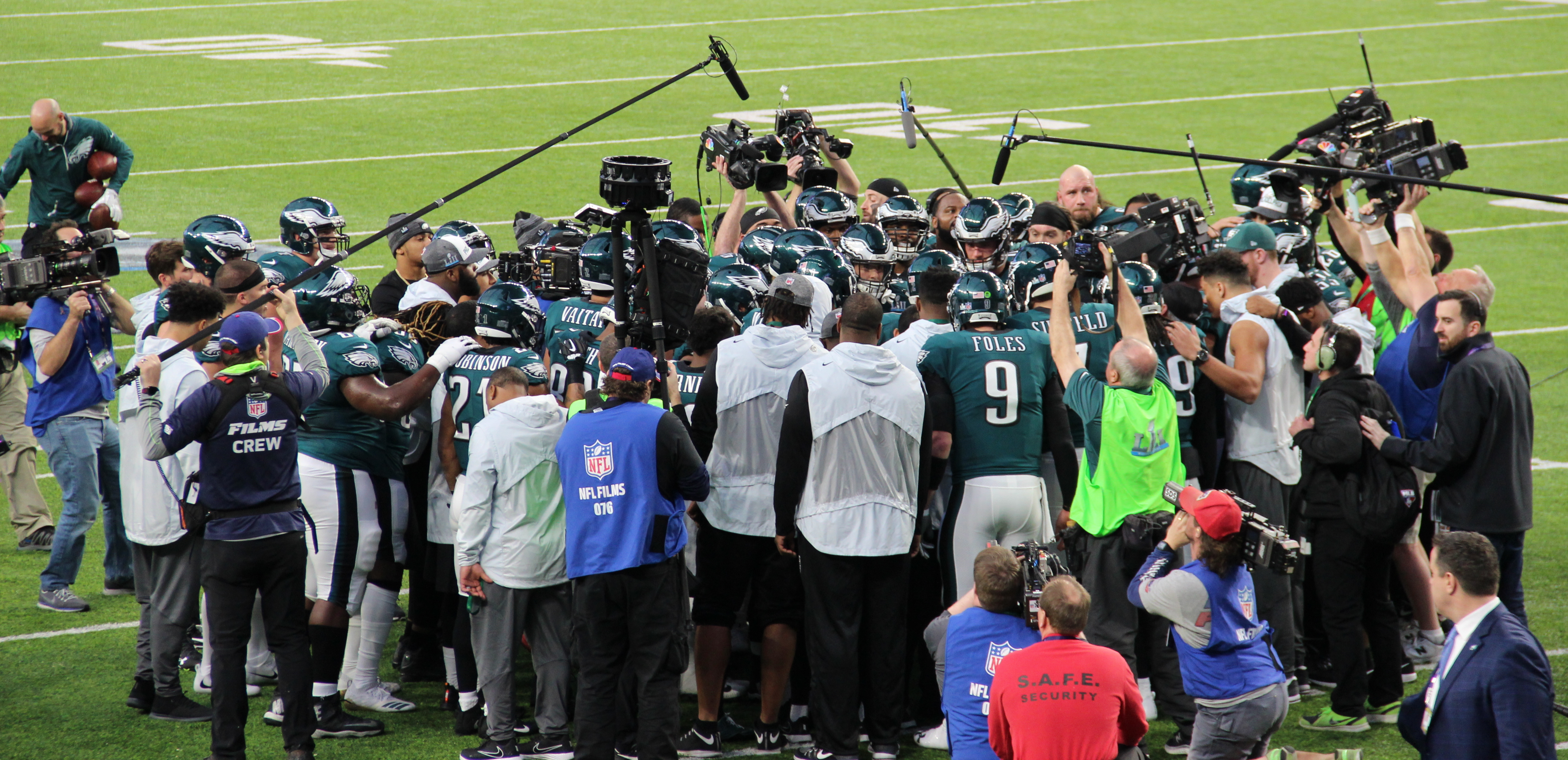
Foles (#9) huddling with the Eagles before Super Bowl LII

==== 2017 season: Super Bowl LII MVP ====
On March 13, 2017, Foles signed a two-year contract to return to the Philadelphia Eagles to back up 2016 first-round pick Carson Wentz.

During Week 14 against the Los Angeles Rams, Foles came in relief of Wentz, who left the game with a torn ACL. Foles completed 6 of 10 passes for 42 yards in the 43–35 road victory, clinching their first division title since 2013. On December 11, 2017, head coach Doug Pederson announced that Foles would be the starter after Wentz was ruled out for the season. Starting his first game of the season in Week 15, Foles threw for 237 yards and four touchdowns in a 34–29 road victory over the New York Giants. The following week, he helped the Eagles defeat the Raiders by a score of 19–10. Foles was 19-of-38 for 163 passing yards, a touchdown, and an interception. Foles had a limited role to avoid injury in the regular season finale, a 6–0 loss to the Cowboys.

On January 13, 2018, the Eagles defeated the Atlanta Falcons 15–10 in the NFC Divisional playoff game, with Foles completing 23 of 30 passes for 246 yards. This was the Eagles' first playoff victory in nine seasons. On January 21, 2018, the Eagles defeated the Minnesota Vikings, 38–7, in the NFC Championship Game, with Foles going 26 of 33 for 352 yards and three touchdowns. The Vikings were 3-point favorites with the league's top-ranked defense entering the game.

In Super Bowl LII, Foles caught a touchdown pass from tight end Trey Burton, becoming the first player to both throw and catch a touchdown pass in a Super Bowl, while also being the third quarterback to catch a pass in a Super Bowl, after John Elway in Super Bowl XXII and Jim Kelly in Super Bowl XXVI. However, unlike Foles, each of those quarterbacks would go on to lose the game. The Eagles defeated the New England Patriots 41–33 to win their first Super Bowl. Foles completed 28 of 43 passes for 373 yards, three touchdowns, and an interception, and was named the Most Valuable Player of the game.

During the Super Bowl LII run, Foles garnered the nickname “Big Dick Nick”, which became a fan chant among supporters.

==== 2018 season ====
On April 20, 2018, Foles and the Eagles agreed on a new revised contract that would contain a $2 million bonus and millions of dollars in incentives if he were to become the starting quarterback, as well as a mutual option for 2019.

On September 3, 2018, Foles was named the starter for the season opener against the Atlanta Falcons, as Wentz was not yet medically cleared for contact. Foles led the Eagles to a 1–1 record through two games, with a touchdown pass, an interception, and a 78.9 passer rating, before Wentz returned as the starter for Week 3.

On December 12, 2018, it was announced that Wentz would probably sit out due to a back injury in the Week 15 game against the Los Angeles Rams, thus giving Foles his third start of the season. Foles started as expected and completed 24 of 31 passes for 277 yards and an interception during the 30–23 road victory. During Week 16, Foles started against the Houston Texans, and threw for 471 yards and four touchdowns with an interception in the narrow 32–30 victory, a performance which earned him the NFC Offensive Player of the Week award. The 471 yards broke Donovan McNabb's record for most passing yards by an Eagles quarterback in a single game.

On December 30, in a Week 17 game with the Washington Redskins, Foles tied the NFL record for consecutive pass completions with 25 in a row, while the Eagles clinched a playoff berth. In the Wild Card playoff game against the Chicago Bears at Soldier Field, Foles led the Eagles on a game-winning touchdown drive that culminated with a pass to Golden Tate with 56 seconds left in the game as the Eagles narrowly won 16–15 and advanced to play the top-seeded New Orleans Saints in the Divisional Round. Against the Saints, Foles threw a touchdown pass on the game's opening drive, and scored another on a quarterback sneak in the first quarter, but the Saints came back to take a 20–14 lead. Late in the game, on what would turn out to be the Eagles last offensive possession, Foles threw a pass that went through receiver Alshon Jeffery's hands and was intercepted by Saints cornerback Marshon Lattimore, which allowed the Saints to run out the clock and win.

On January 19, 2019, the Eagles announced that they would pay Foles the $1 million bonus for playing 33 percent of the Eagles' snaps while the team made the playoffs, even though Foles missed the mark by four plays (32.69 percent). On February 5, the Eagles announced that they would pick up the $20 million option on Foles' contract, but he informed the Eagles that he would void the option that same day, making Foles a free agent.

=== Jacksonville Jaguars ===
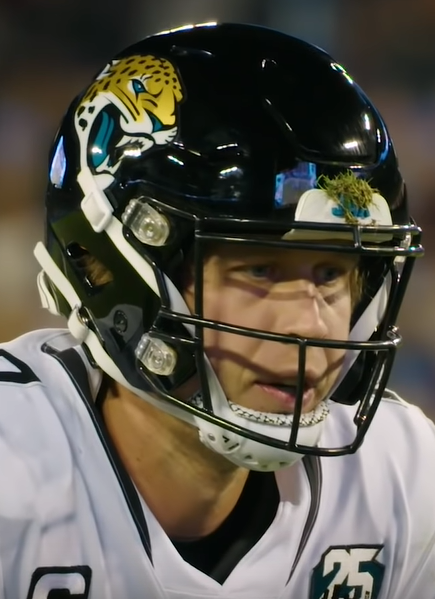
Foles with the Jacksonville Jaguars in 2019

On March 13, 2019, Foles signed a four-year contract worth $88 million with the Jacksonville Jaguars. $50.1 million was guaranteed and could pay up to $102 million with incentives.

Foles started in the season opener against the Kansas City Chiefs completing 5 of 8 passes for 75 yards and a touchdown, but suffered a shoulder injury in the first quarter and was ruled out the rest of the game. It was later revealed that he suffered a broken left clavicle, and he underwent surgery the next day. Foles was designated for return from injured reserve on October 23, 2019, and began practicing with the team. On November 5, Foles was activated and was named the starting quarterback over rookie Gardner Minshew, who had been filling in for him as the starter.

Foles made his return from injury in Week 11 against the Indianapolis Colts, throwing for 296 yards, two touchdowns, and an interception during the 33–13 loss. Two weeks later against the Tampa Bay Buccaneers, Foles completed 7 of 14 passes for just 93 yards with an interception and no touchdowns (and also losing 2 fumbles) before being benched for Minshew after the Jaguars were losing by a score of 25–0 at halftime. Without Foles, the Jaguars went on to lose 28–11. Days after the game, head coach Doug Marrone announced that Foles would be benched and Minshew would retake the starting job. Foles would finish the 2019 season with only four starts in four games, throwing for 736 yards, three touchdowns, and two interceptions.

=== Chicago Bears ===
Foles was traded to the Chicago Bears in exchange for a compensatory fourth-round 2020 NFL draft pick on March 31, 2020. He competed with Mitchell Trubisky for the starting quarterback position during training camp, eventually losing and becoming the backup.

After seeing no action in the first two games of the 2020 season, Foles replaced a struggling Trubisky in the third quarter against the Atlanta Falcons as the Bears trailed by 16 points. Foles completed 16 of 29 passes for 188 yards, three touchdowns, and an interception as he led the team to a 30–26 comeback road victory. A day after the win, Foles was officially named the starter.

During Week 5 against the Tampa Bay Buccaneers on Thursday Night Football, Foles threw for 243 yards, one touchdown, and an interception in the narrow 20–19 victory, marking his first win as the Bears' starting quarterback, having defeated Tom Brady. In Week 9 against the Tennessee Titans, Foles threw for 335 yards and two touchdowns during the 24–17 road loss.

In Week 10 against the Minnesota Vikings on Monday Night Football, Foles threw for 106 yards and an interception before suffering a hip injury that required him to be carted off the field after being slammed to the turf late in the fourth quarter. He was replaced by his backup Tyler Bray with 34 seconds left during the 19–13 loss. With Foles recovering from his injury, Trubisky returned to the starting position for the following game against the Green Bay Packers. Once again the backup, Foles did not see action until Week 16 in Jacksonville when he took over during garbage time in the fourth quarter; he mostly handed off the ball and his lone pass attempt was incomplete as the Bears defeated his former team 41–17.

After being a healthy scratch throughout most of the 2021 season, Foles made his first start in Week 16 against the Seattle Seahawks due to Justin Fields and Andy Dalton dealing with injuries. Foles threw for 250 yards and the game-winning touchdown to Jimmy Graham in the narrow 25–24 victory.

Foles was waived on May 1, 2022.

=== Indianapolis Colts ===
Foles signed a two-year contract with the Indianapolis Colts on May 23, 2022.

After spending the first 15 weeks as a backup, only appearing on two snaps, Foles was named the Colts' starter for their Week 16 game against the Los Angeles Chargers. He threw for 143 yards and three interceptions in the 20–3 loss. Foles was again named the starter for their Week 17 game against the New York Giants, but was injured during the game after a sack by Kayvon Thibodeaux in the second quarter in the 38–10 loss. He did not play again that season and was released on May 5, 2023.

=== Retirement ===
After going unsigned in 2023, Foles officially announced his retirement from the NFL as an Eagle on August 8, 2024. On September 16, Foles signed a ceremonial one-day contract to retire with the Eagles and served as the team's honorary captain later that day for their 2024 season home opener against the Atlanta Falcons.

== Career statistics ==
Legend
	Super Bowl MVP
	Won the Super Bowl
	NFL record
	Led the league
**Bold**	Career high

=== NFL ===
==== Regular season ====
Year	Team	Games			Passing									Rushing					Sacks		Fumbles	
Year	Team	GP	GS	Record	Cmp	Att	Pct	Yds	Avg	Lng	TD	Int	Rtg	Att	Yds	Avg	Lng	TD	Sck	SckY	Fum	Lost
2012	PHI	7	6	1–5	161	265	60.8	1,699	6.4	46	6	5	79.1	11	42	3.8	14	1	20	131	**8**	**3**
2013	PHI	13	10	**8–2**	**203**	317	64.0	**2,891**	**9.1**	63	**27**	2	**119.2**	**57**	**221**	3.9	**21**	**3**	**28**	**173**	4	2
2014	PHI	8	8	6–2	186	311	59.8	2,163	7.0	68	13	**10**	81.4	16	68	4.3	14	0	9	74	4	**3**
2015	STL	11	11	4–7	190	**337**	56.4	2,052	6.1	68	7	**10**	69.0	17	20	1.2	10	1	14	98	5	2
2016	KC	3	1	1–0	36	55	65.5	410	7.5	49	3	0	105.9	4	−4	−1.0	−1	0	4	34	0	0
2017	PHI	7	3	2–1	57	101	56.4	537	5.3	35	5	2	79.5	11	3	0.3	9	0	5	44	6	2
2018	PHI	5	5	4–1	141	195	**72.3**	1,413	7.2	**83**	7	4	96.0	9	17	1.9	4	0	9	47	4	2
2019	JAX	4	4	0–4	77	117	65.8	736	6.3	39	3	2	84.6	4	23	**5.8**	13	0	8	60	2	2
2020	CHI	9	7	2–5	202	312	64.7	1,852	5.9	50	10	8	80.8	16	1	0.1	7	1	18	145	2	0
2021	CHI	1	1	1–0	24	35	68.6	250	7.1	30	1	0	98.5	4	8	2.0	8	0	4	21	1	0
2022	IND	3	2	0–2	25	42	59.5	224	5.3	49	0	4	34.3	2	8	4.0	8	0	8	48	0	0
Career		71	58	29–29	1,302	2,087	62.4	14,227	6.8	83	82	47	86.2	151	407	2.7	21	6	127	875	36	16

==== Postseason ====
Year	Team	Games			Passing									Rushing					Sacks		Fumbles	
Year	Team	GP	GS	Record	Cmp	Att	Pct	Yds	Avg	Lng	TD	Int	Rtg	Att	Yds	Avg	Lng	TD	Sck	SckY	Fum	Lost
2013	PHI	1	1	0–1	23	33	69.7	195	5.9	40	2	0	105.0	1	**3**	**3.0**	**3**	0	**2**	**19**	0	0
2016	KC	DNP																				
2017	PHI	3	3	**3–0**	**77**	**106**	**72.6**	**971**	**9.2**	**55**	**6**	1	**115.7**	**5**	−2	−0.4	1	0	**2**	14	**2**	0
2018	PHI	2	2	1–1	43	71	60.6	467	6.6	37	3	**4**	70.6	3	−1	−0.3	1	**1**	1	8	0	0
2020	CHI	DNP																				
Career		6	6	4–2	143	210	68.1	1,633	7.8	55	11	5	98.8	9	0	0.0	3	1	5	41	2	0

=== College ===
Season	Team	Passing								Rushing			
Season	Team	Cmp	Att	Pct	Yds	Y/A	TD	Int	Rtg	Att	Yds	Avg	TD
2007	Michigan State	5	8	62.5	57	7.1	0	0	122.4	0	0	0.0	0
2008	Arizona	Redshirt											
2009	Arizona	260	410	63.4	2,486	6.1	19	9	125.2	29	-83	-2.9	**3**
2010	Arizona	286	426	67.1	3,191	7.5	20	10	140.9	35	**-113**	**-3.2**	1
2011	Arizona	**387**	**560**	**69.1**	**4,334**	**7.7**	**28**	**14**	**145.6**	**43**	-103	-2.4	0
Career		938	1,404	66.8	10,068	7.2	67	33	138.1	107	-299	-2.8	4

== Career highlights ==
=== Awards and honors ===
NFL

- Super Bowl champion (LII)
- Super Bowl MVP (LII)
- Pro Bowl (2013)
- Pro Bowl Offensive MVP (2013)
- NFL passer rating leader (2013)
- Ranked No. 70 in the Top 100 Players of 2014
- NFC Offensive Player of the Month (November 2013)
- 3× NFC Offensive Player of the Week (Week 6, 2013; Week 9, 2013; Week 16, 2018)

College

- Honorable mention All-Pac-12 (2011)

=== Records ===
- NFL record seven touchdown passes in a game (tied)
- NFL record highest completion percentage in a game with 7 TD passes: 78.57 (2013)
- NFL record most passing touchdowns (7) with a perfect passer rating (158.3) in a game (2013)
- NFL record best touchdown pass–interception differential in a single game: 7 TDs, 0 INTs (2013) (tied)
- NFL record most consecutive pass completions (25) (tied with Philip Rivers and Ryan Tannehill)
- NFL record most consecutive pass completions (25) in one game (tied with Philip Rivers)
- NFL record highest playoff career completion percentage: 68.1%

== Personal life ==
Foles is a Christian. In 2018, he was working online as a graduate student at Liberty University, earning his master's degree in divinity. Foles has stated that he plans to become a pastor after his football career, saying, "I want to be a pastor [...] I took a leap of faith last year and signed up to take classes at seminary. I wanted to continue to learn and challenge my faith. It's a challenge because you are writing papers that are biblically correct."

Foles married Tori Moore, who is the younger sister of former NFL tight end Evan Moore, in 2014. Moore and Foles were briefly teammates with the Eagles in 2012. The couple's daughter was born in 2017. Their son was born on June 19, 2020.

While playing for the Eagles, Foles lived in Haddonfield, New Jersey, but put the home up for sale after signing with the Jaguars in 2019. He then purchased a home in Ponte Vedra Beach, Florida, that same year, but put it up for sale in 2020 after being traded to the Bears. In 2020, Foles purchased a home in Glencoe, Illinois, for $2.8 million.

In 2018, Foles wrote his autobiography, Believe It: My Journey of Success, Failure, and Overcoming the Odds, which debuted at No. 5 on the New York Times best-seller list. He donated the proceeds of the book to charity. Foles also has his own charitable foundation called the Foles Believe Foundation.
