= Don MacLean (basketball) =

American basketball player (born 1970)

Personal information
- Born: January 16, 1970 (age 56) Palo Alto, California, U.S.
- Listed height: 6 ft 10 in (2.08 m)
- Listed weight: 235 lb (107 kg)

Career information
- High school: Simi Valley (Simi Valley, California)
- College: UCLA (1988–1992)
- NBA draft: 1992: 1st round, 19th overall pick
- Drafted by: Detroit Pistons
- Playing career: 1992–2001
- Position: Power forward
- Number: 34, 7, 25, 24

Career history
- 1992–1995: Washington Bullets
- 1995–1996: Denver Nuggets
- 1996–1997: Philadelphia 76ers
- 1997–1998: New Jersey Nets
- 1999: Seattle SuperSonics
- 2000: Phoenix Suns
- 2000–2001: Miami Heat

Career highlights
- NBA Most Improved Player (1994); Consensus second-team All-American (1992); 3× First-team All-Pac-10 (1990–1992); Pac-10 Freshman of the Year (1989); Second-team Parade All-American (1988); McDonald's All-American (1988)

Career NBA statistics
- Points: 3,490 (10.9 ppg)
- Rebounds: 1,210 (3.8 rpg)
- Assists: 404 (1.3 apg)
- Stats at NBA.com
- Stats at Basketball Reference

Donald James MacLean (born January 16, 1970) is an American former professional basketball player who played in the National Basketball Association (NBA). He played college basketball for the UCLA Bruins, and became the all-time scoring leader of both the school and the Pac-12 Conference. In 1994, MacLean won the NBA Most Improved Player Award as a member of the Washington Bullets (known now as the Washington Wizards). He currently works as a basketball color analyst.

== High school career ==
Born in Palo Alto, California, MacLean graduated from Simi Valley High School in Simi Valley, California, where he was an All-American his senior year.

== College career ==
MacLean played in college at UCLA from 1989 to 1992. He set a UCLA varsity freshman season record with 231 rebounds, breaking Don Bragg's previous mark (186) set in 1952. MacLean still holds the school record for points scored (2,608) which is also the Pac-12 Conference's (then known as the Pac-10) all-time scoring record, passing Sean Elliott's then record of 2,555 points. In his senior season, MacLean led UCLA to the 1992 Elite 8. He was inducted into the UCLA Athletics Hall of Fame in 2002.

== NBA career ==
MacLean was the 19th pick (1st round) in the 1992 NBA draft. He was initially drafted by the Detroit Pistons but was traded on draft day to the Washington Bullets. MacLean, along with his 1994–95 Washington Bullets teammates Rex Chapman, Tom Gugliotta, and Scott Skiles, all reunited in Phoenix in 1999–2000 when Chapman, Gugliotta, and MacLean were Suns players and Skiles was the head coach. As highly productive scoring Bullets teammates in 1994–95, Chapman averaged 11.0 points per game (ranked 4th highest on the team), Gugliotta averaged 16.0 (5th on the team), Skiles averaged 13.0 (6th on the team), and MacLean averaged 11.0 (7th on the team). However, as Suns teammates, Gugliotta averaged 13.7 (5th on the team), Chapman averaged only 6.6 (9th on the team), and MacLean averaged only 2.6 (15th on the team). MacLean is considered by many to have had one of the quickest releases in the game.

In November 2000, the NBA suspended MacLean five games for testing positive for steroids. He was the first player suspended for steroid use. Charles Barkley later commented "I've seen Don MacLean naked, and he doesn't use steroids."

== Broadcasting career ==
MacLean served as the color analyst on the UCLA Basketball Radio Network. He was an analyst on the Los Angeles Clippers TV broadcasts on Bally Sports West and Bally Sports SoCal. He also is a weekly basketball contributor on Fox Sports Radio Network's Petros and Money Show. MacLean also served as the color analyst for various games on the Pac-12 Network. MacLean is currently a color analyst for the Big Ten Network.

== Personal life ==
MacLean lives in Southern California with his wife, Brooke, and three sons Kyle, Blake and Trent.

== Career statistics ==
Legend
GP	Games played	GS	Games started	MPG	Minutes per game
FG%	Field goal percentage	3P%	3-point field goal percentage	FT%	Free throw percentage
RPG	Rebounds per game	APG	Assists per game	SPG	Steals per game
BPG	Blocks per game	PPG	Points per game	**Bold**	Career high

=== NBA ===
==== Regular season ====
Year	Team	GP	GS	MPG	FG%	3P%	FT%	RPG	APG	SPG	BPG	PPG
1992–93	Washington	62	4	10.9	.435	.500	.811	2.0	.6	.2	.1	6.6
1993–94	Washington	**75**	**69**	**33.2**	**.502**	.143	**.824**	**6.2**	**2.1**	**.6**	**.3**	**18.2**
1994–95	Washington	39	20	27.0	.438	.250	.765	4.2	1.3	.4	.1	11.0
1995–96	Denver	56	5	19.8	.426	.286	.732	3.7	1.6	.4	.1	11.2
1996–97	Philadelphia	37	2	19.8	.447	.316	.660	3.8	1.0	.3	**.3**	10.9
1997–98	New Jersey	9	0	4.7	.100	.500	–	.6	.0	.0	.0	.3
1998–99	Seattle	17	10	21.5	.396	.273	.625	3.8	.9	.3	**.3**	10.9
1999–00	Phoenix	16	0	8.9	.367	.333	.667	1.4	.5	.1	.1	2.6
2000–01	Miami	8	1	9.5	.500	**1.000**	.750	2.3	.5	**.6**	.1	3.9
Career		319	111	20.9	.455	.284	.765	3.8	1.3	.4	.2	10.9

== See also ==
- List of NCAA Division I men's basketball career free throw scoring leaders
- Pac-12 Conference Hall of Honor
