= 2010 Alamo Bowl (December) =

2010 Valero Alamo Bowl
- 18th Alamo Bowl
Oklahoma State Cowboys	Arizona Wildcats
(10–2)	(7–5)
Big 12	Pac-10
36	10
Head coach: Mike Gundy	Head coach: Mike Stoops
AP / Coaches / BCS; 16 / 13 / 14
	1	2	3	4	Total
Oklahoma State	17	6	10	3	36
Arizona	7	0	3	0	10
- Date: December 29, 2010
- Season: 2010
- Stadium: Alamodome
- Location: San Antonio, Texas
- MVP: Brandon Weeden QB, OSU
- Favorite: Oklahoma St. by 5
- Referee: David Smith (C-USA)
- Attendance: 57,593
- Payout: US$2.25 million

United States TV coverage
- Network: ESPN
- Announcers: Rece Davis, Jesse Palmer, Craig James and Jenn Brown
- Nielsen ratings: 3.0

The 2010 Valero Alamo Bowl game was the 18th edition of the annual college football bowl game known previously as the Alamo Bowl. It was played on December 29, 2010 (9:15 p.m. ET) between the Oklahoma State Cowboys and the Arizona Wildcats. ESPN television broadcast the game.

== Teams ==
=== Oklahoma State ===
The Cowboys were kept out of the Big 12 Championship Game after a late season loss to Oklahoma and entered the game with a 10–2 record. The team was led by star receiver Justin Blackmon who had 1665 yards receiving and 18 touchdown catches on the season. The Cowboys beat out Big 12 finalist, Nebraska for the selection in the contest. This is the first time in history that an Oklahoma State team had won 10 games in a season. This was the fifth straight year that the Cowboys had appeared in a bowl game. This was the third time in school history that Oklahoma State had played in the Alamo Bowl, having previously lost to Purdue in 1997 and Ohio State in 2004.

Oklahoma State was led offensively by Kendall Hunter (271 rushes for 1,548 yards, 16 TD), Brandon Weeden (317 of 470 passes for 4,037 yards, 32 TD) and Justin Blackmon (102 catches for 1665 yards, 18 TD). On the defense, the team was led by Orie Lemon (119 tackles, 93 solo), Jamie Blatnick (5.0 sacks for 29 yards) and Andrew McGee (5 interceptions for 90 yards).

=== Arizona ===
The Wildcats started the season 7–1 and looked like a serious contender for the Pacific-10 Conference championship. However, Arizona lost their last four games and come into the contest with a 7–5 record. The Alamo Bowl marks the third straight season that the Wildcats appeared in a bowl game after not appearing in one since 1998. This was the first time that Arizona played in the Alamo Bowl in school history.

Arizona led the conference in pass offense, completed 325 of 474 passes for 3,720 yards (310 yards per game) with 9 interceptions and 24 touchdowns. Individually, quarterback Nick Foles led the Pac-10, completed 254 of 376 passes for 2,911 yards (291.1 yards per game) with 7 interceptions and 19 touchdowns. Top receiver was Juron Criner, who caught 73 passes for 1,186 yards or 98.8 yards per game for 10 touchdowns. His longest catch was for 85 yards. Ricky Elmore led defensively with 10 sacks and 2 assists.

== Game notes ==
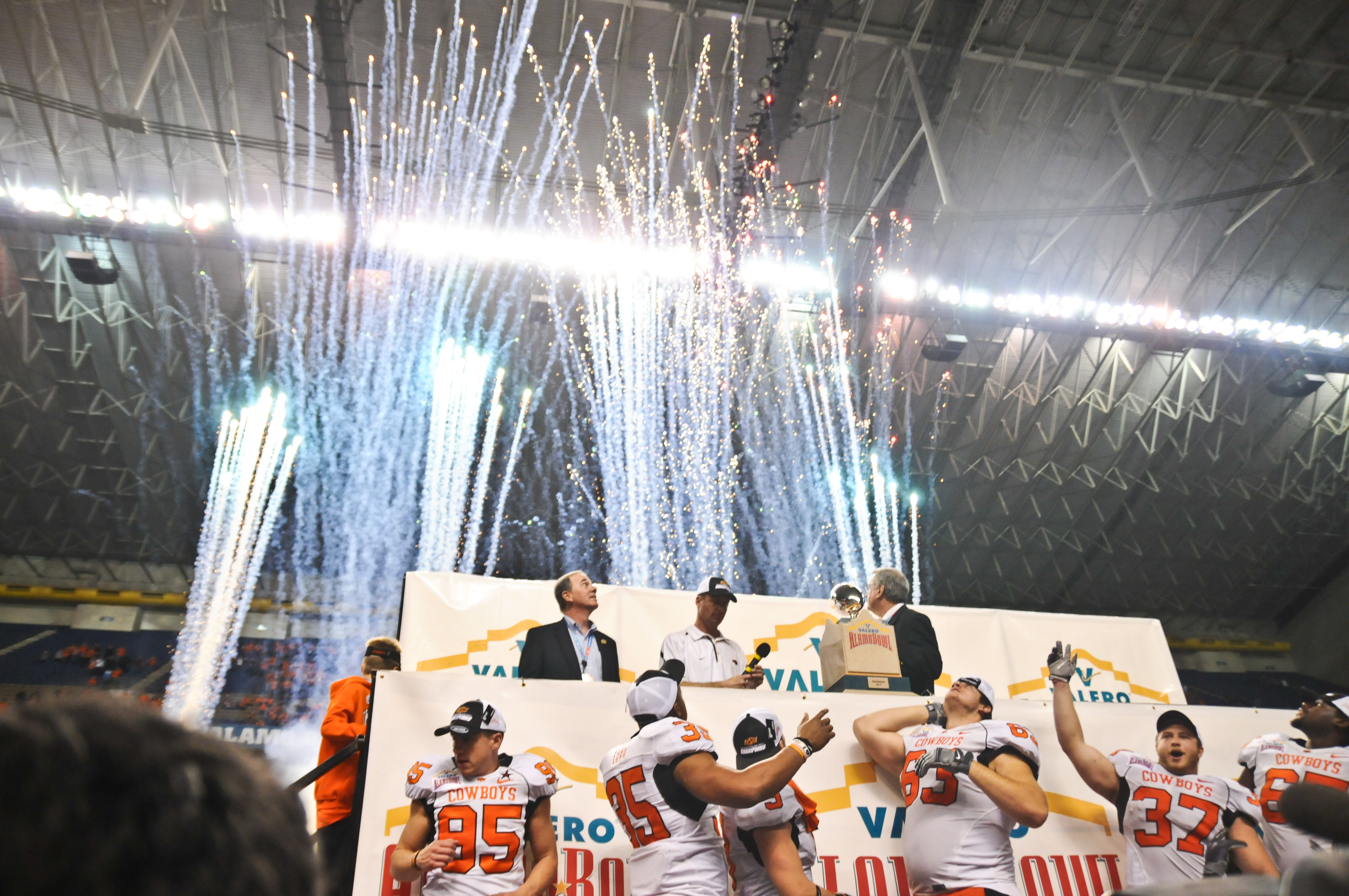
Oklahoma State players receive the Alamo Bowl trophy. Dan Bailey (#95) would later join the NFL's Dallas Cowboys. Coach Mike Gundy is carrying a microphone.

The game marked the seventh time that the programs had played each other, but first time since 1942. The series was tied at 3–3. The two schools had never played each other in a bowl game prior to the Alamo Bowl.

The Cowboys and Wildcats met again less than nine months later on September 8, 2011, and again the Cowboys defeated the Wildcats, though by a smaller margin of 37–14.
