= Petros Papadakis =

American sportscaster (born 1977)

No. 35
- Position: Tailback

Personal information
- Born: June 16, 1977 (age 49)

Career information
- College: USC Trojans (1997–2000)

Petros Papadakis (born June 16, 1977) is an American sportscaster who serves as a college football analyst for Fox Sports and co-host of the Petros and Money Show on AM 570 LA Sports, Los Angeles. He played college football as a tailback and was team captain for the USC Trojans. He is the self-proclaimed "captain of the worst team in USC history."

== Football career ==
Papadakis's family has long-held ties to University of Southern California (USC) sports. His father, John (Yiannis), and his brother, Taso, both played football at USC. His maternal grandfather, Dr. Ernest Schultz, played basketball for the Trojans. In spite of the family's close ties to USC, his younger brother Demetrius walked on to crosstown rival UCLA's football team and was a member of the 2008 team. Petros planned to play football for the UCLA Bruins, but the Bruins lost interest in recruiting him and canceled his visit to campus.

Papadakis started his college career at the University of California, Berkeley. He left the Cal Fall football training camp, undetected, in the middle of the night and hitchhiked back to Los Angeles after being homesick after one week.

While playing for USC, Papadakis scored 16 touchdowns. In 1999 and 2000, he was named USC's team captain. However, he broke his foot in August 1999, requiring several operations that caused him to miss that season. After months of rehabilitation, Papadakis returned in 2000. His teammates honored this accomplishment, voting Papadakis that season's "Most Inspirational Player."

In the 2000 season, USC won its opening game against Penn State in the Kickoff Classic with a score of 29–5 at the Meadowlands. Playing on his repaired foot, Papadakis scored a touchdown and gained 29 yards on 11 carries. The Trojans began the season 3–0 and were ranked 8th in the national polls. But the team collapsed and finished with a 5–7 overall record.

The Trojans 2–6 conference record in 2000 was the only time the team finished in the last league position. Since his first year in broadcasting, Papadakis has regularly called himself "the captain of the worst team in USC history".

During his university football career, Papadakis played in the 1998 Sun Bowl, where the team lost to Texas Christian University, scoring a touchdown during this game.

Papadakis's first experience of broadcasting occurred when he was a tailback for the USC football team, where he became a popular interviewee among media in Los Angeles. When questioned about his popularity, Papadakis replied, "I just feel like the media is starved for somebody to say something different than, 'We really have to play hard this week.' That’s all good stuff, but I deal with that in meetings every day. I deal with that for six hours with coaches."

== Television and movie career ==
In 2002 and 2003 Papadakis continued broadcasting on FSN, and took employment as a sideline reporter for FSN's High School Game of the Week. He also became the host of the USC Magazine Show on FSN.

In 2004, Fox Sports Net hired him to comment on national Pac-10 games alongside Barry Tompkins. Petros had no booth experience when FSN named him its top color analyst.

Papadakis hosted Pros vs Joes on Spike TV for three seasons. In late 2008, the network announced it would replace Papadakis with former New York Giants defensive end Michael Strahan for the show's fourth season.

From 2006 to 2010, Papadakis called a number of games as part of the California State High School Bowl Championship game on FSN.

In the autumn of 2007, Papadakis appeared on KNBC Channel 4 as Fred Roggin's co-host on The Challenge, which followed NBC's Football Night in America on Sunday evenings. He has continued on the show since then, recently completing his 11th season on the show with Roggin.

Papadakis has been featured on several television networks including KTLA, VH-1, GSN, ESPN and E!. In 2005, he guest starred on the CBS hit series CSI: NY, where he played a sports talk radio host.

Petros appeared in an episode of The 7D titled "Whose Voice is it Anyway" as the King of Echoes from February 2016.

Appearing in Trial by Fire, Petros plays the voice of the Dallas Cowboys from a 1999 game being played on the radio. The film stars Jack O'Connell and Laura Dern.

Currently, Papadakis provides analysis for Fox Sports on their college football telecasts as well as FS1's Fox Sports Live studio show.

== Radio career ==
Papadakis's first regular radio experience came in 1998 while he was a junior tailback at USC.

In the summer of 2001, Papadakis began working on radio in addition to his TV duties. He co-hosted the weekly USC Insider with Pete Arbogast on the now defunct station KMPC-1540 AM, called "The Ticket". In 2002 and 2003 Papadakis was the sideline reporter for USC games, and in January 2003 hosted the "Bonus Hour". Papadakis and Mark Willard co-hosted a show from 9 to 10am on weekdays. Papadakis also became a regular guest on the Kevin and Bean morning show on KROQ-FM in Los Angeles.

In January 2004 "The Petros Papadakis Show" began on KMPC. It was produced by Craig Larson and featured Cornelius (CORN DOGG) Edwards and traffic reporter Sabina Mora. Brian Vieira became the show's producer in June 2005.

"The Petros Papadakis Show" was known for Papadakis's musical parodies such as "I'm 'n Luv (Wit da Clippers)" and "I Love Yee Doyers" (I Love the Dodgers). He was also known for his "Pop Culture Report", reporting the news of young celebrities in Hollywood.

Papadakis resigned from his position at 1540 The Ticket in October 2006 to concentrate on his television broadcasting. Within a month of his resignation, KMPC laid off most of its remaining local employees. Sporting News Radio sold its interest in the station on March 30, 2007, and it became a Korean language station.

On January 8, 2007, Petros returned to AM radio with an afternoon sports program on KLAC, on 570 kHz, a Los Angeles–based station, co-hosting the Petros and Money Show with Matt "Money" Smith. Two years later, the show was nationally syndicated because of a merger between Fox Sports Radio and KLAC. The network carried the program nationwide until January 2014, when it was dropped from the national network, but remained as a local show.

In addition to his other media duties, Papadakis worked part-time for the USC men's basketball team as its public address announcer from 2004 to 2016.

== Education ==
He is a graduate of the Christ Lutheran School, Palos Verdes Peninsula High School, and University of Southern California.
