= David Douglas (wide receiver) =

American football player (born 1989)

No. 89
- Position: Wide receiver

Personal information
- Born: June 27, 1989 (age 37); Dallas, Texas, U.S.
- Listed height: 6 ft 0 in (1.83 m)
- Listed weight: 205 lb (93 kg)

Career information
- High school: McKinney (TX) North
- College: Arizona
- NFL draft: 2012: undrafted

Career history
- New York Giants (2012)*; Tampa Bay Buccaneers (2012)
- * Offseason or practice squad member only
- Stats at Pro Football Reference

David Douglas (born June 27, 1989) is an American former football wide receiver. He played college football at Arizona. He was signed by the New York Giants as an undrafted rookie free agent on May 11, 2012. He was signed off the Giant's practice squad to the Tampa Bay Buccaneers active roster on November 22, 2012.
