= Petros and Money Show =

Sports talk radio program

The Petros and Money Show or "PMS" is a sports talk radio program in Los Angeles. It airs on KLAC-AM, ("AM 570") every Monday through Friday from 3pm to 7pm PT. PMS is hosted by Petros Papadakis and Matt "Money" Smith.

== History ==
On January 5, 2007, KLAC announced that The Petros and Money Show would replace a show co-hosted by Joe Grande (formerly of KPWR-FM's Big Boy's Neighborhood morning show) and former UCLA quarterback Wayne Cook.

On January 21, 2009, Petros and Money replaced Andrew Siciliano on Fox Sports Radio. The network carried the program nationwide until January 2014, when it was dropped from the national network, but remained as a local show.

For a period starting in January, 2011, the first hour was broadcast commercial free, thus the name was changed to the "Commercial-Free" hour.

The original producer of the show was David Vassegh. In March 2012, David Vassegh left to work for Dodgers radio and he was replaced by Tim Cates.

They currently only broadcast in the Los Angeles area, broadcasting 4 hours of LA sports. However, if there is a Dodgers broadcast, they often issue a "flex alert", where they will start their show earlier.

== Format ==
While sports are central to PMS, the show also covers topics such as music, popular culture, literature, politics, and history.

Once their show has begun, Papadakis and Smith announce a word, number, and song of the day, usually in relation to sports headlines or the outcomes of games of local interest. The first hour contains a "split top story", the second has a "top story", and the third has a "flip top story". These segments traditionally consist of the biggest headlines in sports.

Every day of the week has its own title on the show: "Me First/I'm a Horse! Monday", "Tired of the Lies/La Tuya/Racist/Tu Hermano Tuesday", "Win Forever/Chin Forever Wednesday/We Just Won't Be Defeated Wednesday/Walk your bike/Watch your mouth", "Crunchy Groove/Three Things/Inglewood/Tap That Thursday", and "Frogman/Free-form Friday". As of mid-July 2009, Monday's "Tell Me How My Ass Tastes" handle was deemed no longer relevant in light of Kobe's answer to Shaq's June 2008 dis rap from which it was derived. Papadakis and Money dropped the lyric and opted for the less-controversial "I'm a horse!" In August 2009, Papadakis and Smith made two changes to their titles, replacing "I believe I can fly" Friday with "Frogman" Friday and "Throw down your arms" Thursday with "Crunchy Groove" Thursday. In light of Pete Carroll's coaching move from USC to the Seattle Seahawks, it was announced on 1/20/2010 that "Win Forever Wednesday" would be replaced by "Watch Your Mouth Wednesday" and "Walk Your Bike Wednesday". "We Just Won't Be Defeated Wednesday" will continue to be used. "Walk your bike" has turned into a movement of sorts by Papadakis, who often posts pictures of walk your bike signs through Twitter. Starting from 5/5/2010, Wednesday has also been referred to as "White Pants Wednesday", a reference to friend of the show, Mark Sanchez's white jeans worn in a GQ photo shoot.

The third hour of every broadcast typically features segments that correlate with the day of the week. Mondays and Wednesdays feature more pop-culture oriented features. Monday features the "Lista de la Lunes", a list of sports and pop-culture lists ranging from topics such as "Things that seemed much cooler when you were younger but not so much when you grew up." Wednesdays sometimes feature the "Wednesday Night Film Fight" where the hosts pick two similarly themed movies, argue their relative merits using clips from the movies, and take call-in votes from listeners to determine the "winner".

Tuesday and Thursday's third hour feature an entirely different format in the time slot, with Papadakis and Smith taking calls as their alter egos. On Thursday, Papadakis assumes the identity of Lance Romance, a "ladies man" who lives in Newport Beach, drives a red Mazda Miata with 24-inch spinning rims, and supposedly drives up to the studio in Burbank, California every Thursday to take calls from people of Los Angeles, to whom he distributes love and relationship advice. Largely due to its high proportion of Latino callers, Lance often refers to his segment as "Latino Loveline" and himself as "Tu Hermano de Amor" (your brother of love). Lance Romance does not, as some might expect, encourage his committed callers to cheat on their wives or spouses, often telling those contemplating such a decision that it will "ruin your life". On Tuesday, Smith's alter ego (and, according to the storyline, Lance Romance's cousin) Vance Finance, a wealthy real estate tycoon and investment banker, flies in by helicopter to dole out financial advice and offer the occasional college and pro football picks to the show's listeners.

On Fridays, at the end of the second hour, Papadakis' father, former USC Linebacker and restaurateur, John Papadakis, calls in. The third hour has now been turned over to callers and emailers with myriad requests, Papadakis and Smith to act out certain improvisational situations with both men doing their various vocal imitations, ranging from Smith's imitation of the Tevado Tequila Thunderbird, a former sponsor of the show, to Papadakis' imitation of his father, John.

The last half hour of every show is devoted to a "Not Sports Report", where Smith and Papadakis take turns describing recent news stories in a wide range of sports-independent topics, including pop culture. They then honor the birthdays of two people- one deceased, one alive- before closing the show.

== Bumper music ==
The first hour opens with "Clandestino" by Manu Chao. The second hour of the show opens with "Each One Teach One" by Jacob Miller. The third hour opens with "Rebellion (Lies)" by The Arcade Fire. The fourth hour opens with "Microphone Fiend" by Eric B & Rakim. The fifth, or bonus hour, opens with "A Little Respect" by Erasure. If a show begins on a half hour mark, "Du Hast" by Rammstein is the opening song.

== Show cast ==
Aside from Papadakis and Smith, the show features a number of people who have had some function on the show in various means. Many people have some sort of jingle, provided by singer Steve Bush of the group The Bill Shakespeares. The show's Engineer, Ronnie Facio, is considered the "lynchpin" of the show, not only handling the show's broadcast quality, but also the man responsible for the music played after commercial breaks. At the end of each show, Facio cites the "Three Songs" of the day, a selection of music that is highlighted, along with the "playlist" of songs featured that day. Facio is also featured during the weekly segment, "How Was Your Weekend?" which highlights the first hour of the show on Mondays. Facio's colleague and fellow engineer, Kevin Figgers, also contributes to the show, especially when Facio takes the occasional vacation. Figgers, whose jingle refers to his "Deep" roots in South LA, "78th and Vermont", tries to vary his musical style to differentiate from Facio's.

Former NBA player Don MacLean is a regular guest on the show. He is also a regular substitute host when either is unavailable for the radio program.

An advertiser on the show, attorney Sweet James Bergener, appears every Wednesday for a segment called Justice with Sweet James in which Petros and Money ask legal questions involving sports and current events.

A number of current and former interns to the show are frequent contributors, especially on Fridays, during the "Lessons Learned" segment that anchors the second hour, all of whom have at some point, been honored with jingles by Bush. Amongst the contributors are:

Missak Tokmanian, Papadakis' former intern during his days at AM1540, Missak became a fixture on the show until 2012, when he left Fox Sports Radio for a position with the lending company 1-800-Loan-Mart. His jingle mentions his now-former position as the show's "Twitter Bandit" and his infamous "Man Date" where he went to dinner with a friend, which had him mocked mercilessly.

"Fully Functional Employee" Adam Ausland: Another former intern who also graduated to full-time employee of the network's flagship.

Alonso "Gonzo" Nunez: Nunez, who is known best for his many appearances when the show is doing live remotes, is Papadakis' "Bodyguard" and is one of the few non-employees of the show who has a jingle. His jingle highlights his ethnic heritage, political beliefs and occupation all in a five-word jingle. He, along with Tohkmanian and former intern "Frenchie" participate in the lessons learned segment by repeating the lesson number in Spanish, Armenian, French, and other languages, depending on the intern's language prowess. Past interns have added Hungarian, Korean and Japanese to the countdowns in the past.
