= Kendall Hunter =

American football player (born 1988)

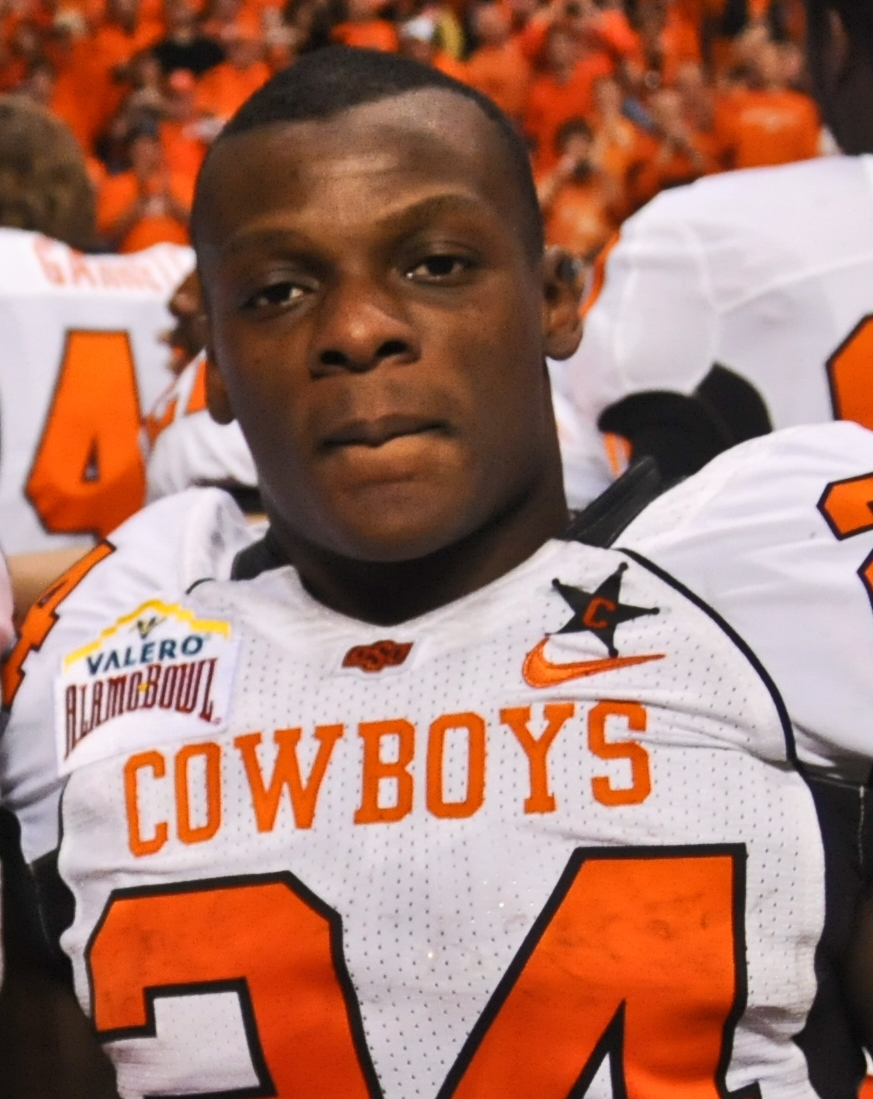
- Hunter after the 2010 Alamo Bowl with Oklahoma State

No. 32, 48
- Position: Running back

Personal information
- Born: September 16, 1988 (age 38); Tyler, Texas, U.S.
- Listed height: 5 ft 7 in (1.70 m)
- Listed weight: 199 lb (90 kg)

Career information
- High school: John Tyler (Tyler, Texas)
- College: Oklahoma State
- NFL draft: 2011: 4th round, 115th overall pick

Career history
- San Francisco 49ers (2011–2015); New Orleans Saints (2015); Toronto Argonauts (2017)*
- * Offseason or practice squad member only

Awards and highlights
- Consensus All-American (2010); First-team All-American (2008); First-team All-Big 12 (2008, 2010)

Career NFL statistics
- Rushing attempts: 263
- Rushing yards: 1,204
- Rushing touchdowns: 7
- Receptions: 27
- Receiving yards: 268
- Stats at Pro Football Reference

Kendall Bernell Hunter (born September 16, 1988) is an American former professional football player who was a running back in the National Football League (NFL). He played college football for the Oklahoma State Cowboys, earning consensus All-American honors in 2010. He was selected by the San Francisco 49ers in the fourth round of the 2011 NFL draft.

== Early life ==
Hunter was born in Tyler, Texas. He attended John Tyler High School in Tyler, where he played football and ran track. In football, he rushed for 1,200 yards and 14 touchdowns as a senior. Considered a three-star recruit by Rivals.com, Hunter was listed as the No. 40 running back prospect in the nation. Hunter suffered a knee injury in high school that limited his potential suitors. Hunter was a first-team all-district selection following his junior season during which he rushed for 1,056 yards and twelve touchdowns.

He also competed in track & field. He was timed at 11.3 seconds in the 100 meter dash as a senior. He was also a member of the 4 × 100 m relay (41.58 s).

College recruiting
Name	Hometown	School	Height	Weight	40^{‡}	Commit date
Kendall Hunter; RB	Tyler, TX	Tyler HS	5 ft 6 in (1.68 m)	185 lb (84 kg)	4.4	Jan 14, 2007
Kendall Hunter; RB	Recruit ratings: Scout: Rivals: 247Sports: (76)					
Overall recruit ranking: Scout: 50 (RB) Rivals: 40 (RB), 83 (TX) 247Sports: 41 (RB), 62 (TX) ESPN: 73 (RB)
‡ Refers to 40-yard dash; Note: In many cases, Scout, Rivals, 247Sports, On3, and ESPN may conflict in their listings of height, weight and 40 time.; In these cases, the average was taken. ESPN grades are on a 100-point scale.; Sources: "2007 Oklahoma St. Football Commitment List". Rivals.; "2007 Oklahoma State College Football Recruiting Commits". Scout.; "Oklahoma State Cowboys 2007 Player Commits". ESPN.; "Scout.com Team Recruiting Rankings". Scout.; "2007 Team Ranking". Rivals.com.; "Oklahoma State 2007 Football Commits". 247Sports.

== College career ==
While attending Oklahoma State University, Hunter played for coach Mike Gundy's Cowboys football teams from 2007 to 2010. He was the nation's seventh leading rusher with 119.6 yards per game, including nine 100-yard rushing games, in 2008. He led the Big 12 Conference in rushing by more than 30 yards per game. He was named a first-team All-American after his sophomore season in 2008, and was recognized as a consensus first-team All-American as a senior in 2010. As a senior, he was also a finalist for the Doak Walker award which was won by LaMichael James, his teammate with San Francisco until James's release in 2014.

== Professional career ==
Pre-draft measurables
Height	Weight	Arm length	Hand span	Wingspan	40-yard dash	10-yard split	20-yard split	20-yard shuttle	Three-cone drill	Vertical jump	Broad jump	Bench press
5 ft 7 1/4 in (1.71 m)	199 lb (90 kg)	31 in (0.79 m)	8 3/4 in (0.22 m)	6 ft 1 1/2 in (1.87 m)	4.53 s	1.57 s	2.59 s	4.21 s	6.74 s	35 in (0.89 m)	10 ft 2 in (3.10 m)	24 reps
All values from 2011 NFL Scouting Combine/Pro Day

=== San Francisco 49ers ===
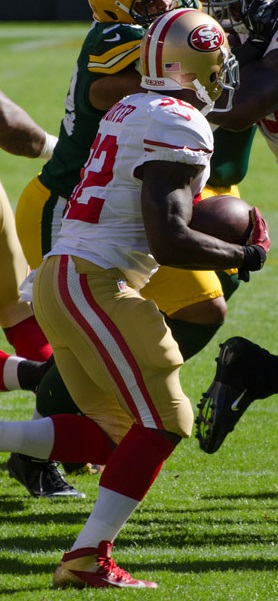
Hunter runs the ball in 2012 against the Green Bay Packers.

Hunter was selected by the San Francisco 49ers in the fourth round (115th overall) in the 2011 NFL Draft.

Hunter received his first start of his NFL career in week 4 of the 2011 season against the Philadelphia Eagles. He rushed for 473 yards (with an average yard per carry of 4.2) and scored 2 touchdowns during the regular season in a backup role to starting running back Frank Gore. Late in the 2012 season Hunter was put on injured reserve with a torn Achilles.

Over the summer of 2013, Hunter reportedly rehabilitated at Cosumnes River College with physical therapist Weinshilboum according to a June 18 article in the Sacramento Bee. Hunter spent time performing parcour across the Cosumnes campus, Bee writer Yolanda Marie wrote. Hunter was activated off the physically unable to perform list on August 10, 2013, nearly 8 1/2 months after he partially tore his left Achilles.

On July 26, 2014, Hunter was carted off the field due to a knee injury. Later an MRI revealed that he tore his ACL. The 49ers later waived him on August 5. After clearing waivers, he was placed on the 49ers' injured reserve list.

=== New Orleans Saints ===
On December 16, 2015, Hunter signed with the New Orleans Saints after starting running back Mark Ingram II was placed on injured reserve. On January 1, 2016, Hunter was placed on injured reserve.

=== Toronto Argonauts ===
On March 1, 2017, Hunter signed with the Toronto Argonauts of the Canadian Football League (CFL). On June 2, Hunter announced his retirement from professional football.

== Career statistics ==
=== NFL ===
Year	Team	Games		Rushing					Receiving				
Year	Team	GP	GS	Att	Yds	Avg	Lng	TD	Rec	Yds	Avg	Lng	TD
2011	SF	16	1	112	473	4.2	44	2	16	195	12.2	44	0
2012	SF	11	0	72	371	5.2	26	2	9	60	6.7	12	0
2013	SF	16	0	78	358	4.6	45	3	2	13	6.5	9	0
2014	SF	0	0	Did not play due to injury									
2015	NO	2	0	1	2	2.0	2	0	0	0	0.0	0	0
Career		45	1	263	1,204	4.6	45	7	27	268	9.9	44	0

=== College ===
Year	Team	Games		Rushing				Receiving			
Year	Team	GP	GS	Att	Yards	Avg	TD	Rec	Yards	Avg	TD
2007	Oklahoma State	12	0	107	696	6.5	4	10	137	13.7	1
2008	Oklahoma State	13	13	241	1,555	6.5	16	22	198	9.0	1
2009	Oklahoma State	8	8	89	382	4.3	1	11	83	7.5	0
2010	Oklahoma State	13	13	271	1,548	5.7	16	20	101	5.1	0
Career		46	34	708	4,181	5.9	37	63	519	8.2	2
