= 2015 Arizona Wildcats football team =

American college football season

2015 Arizona Wildcats football

New Mexico Bowl champion

New Mexico Bowl, W 45–37 vs. New Mexico
- Conference: Pac-12 Conference
- South Division
- Record: 7–6 (3–6 Pac-12)
- Head coach: Rich Rodriguez (4th season)
- Co-offensive coordinators: Calvin Magee (4th season); Rod Smith (4th season)
- Offensive scheme: Spread option
- Defensive coordinator: Jeff Casteel (4th season)
- Base defense: 3–3–5
- Captain: 13: QB - Jerrard Randall; DB - Reggie Gilbert; RB - Jared Baker; S - Jamar Allah; OL - Lene Maiava; S - Will Parks; WR - David Richards; PK - Casey Skoworon; P - Drew Riggleman; S - Anthony Lopez; OL - Kaige Lawrence; DL - Jeff Worthy; WR - Johnny Jackson
- Home stadium: Arizona Stadium

Uniform
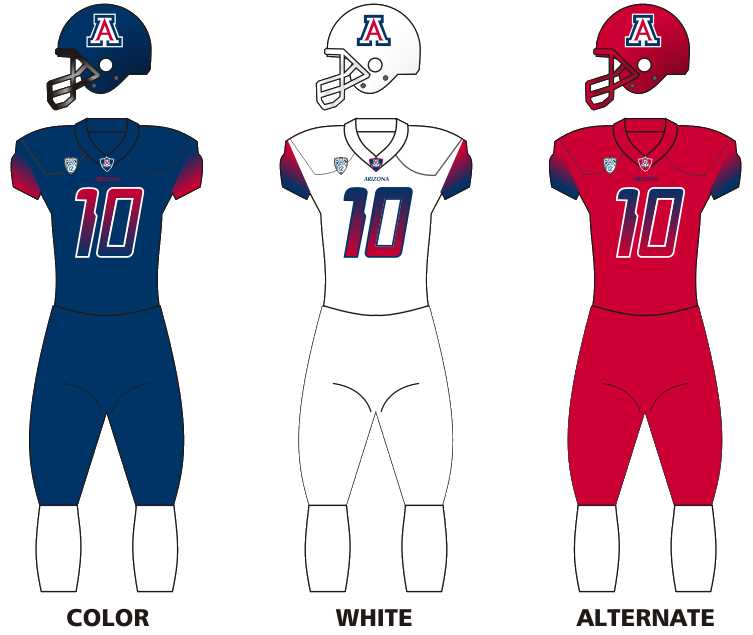

2015 Pac-12 Conference football standings
	Conf.			Overall
Team	W		L	W		L
North Division
No. 3 Stanford xy$	8	–	1	12	–	2
No. 19 Oregon	7	–	2	9	–	4
Washington State	6	–	3	9	–	4
California	4	–	5	8	–	5
Washington	4	–	5	7	–	6
Oregon State	0	–	9	2	–	10
South Division
USC xy	6	–	3	8	–	6
No. 17 Utah x	6	–	3	10	–	3
UCLA	5	–	4	8	–	5
Arizona State	4	–	5	6	–	7
Arizona	3	–	6	7	–	6
Colorado	1	–	8	4	–	9
Championship: Stanford 41, USC 22
$ – Conference champion; x – Division champion/co-champions; y – Championship game participant; Rankings from AP Poll

The 2015 Arizona Wildcats football team represented the University of Arizona in the 2015 NCAA Division I FBS football season. It marked the Wildcats's 116th overall season, 38th as a member of the Pac-12 Conference and its 5th within the Pac-12 South Division. The team was led by head coach Rich Rodriguez, in his fourth year, and played its home games at Arizona Stadium in Tucson, AZ for the 87th straight year. They finished the season 7–6, 3–6 in Pac-12 play to finish in fifth place in the South Division. They were invited to the New Mexico Bowl where they defeated New Mexico.

== Before the season ==
=== Recruiting class ===
The Wildcats would go on to land another top 10 recruiting class in 2015 (#41 by Scout, #41 by Rivals, #39 by ESPN, and #41 by 247).

The Wildcats would also add two transfer players: graduate student David Catalano (OL) from San José State who is able to play immediately, as well as John Kenny (LB) from Iowa who sit out two years to satisfy the NCAA's transfer rule.

College recruiting
Name	Hometown	School	Height	Weight	40^{‡}	Commit date
Matt Morin #1 TE–H (JC)	Murrieta, CA	Riverside Community College	6 ft 2 in (1.88 m)	245 lb (111 kg)	-	Sep 15, 2014
Matt Morin #1 TE–H (JC)	Recruit ratings: Scout: Rivals: 247Sports: ESPN:					
Anthony Fotu #5 DT (JC)	Oakland, CA	Laney College	6 ft 4 in (1.93 m)	285 lb (129 kg)	-	Dec 17, 2014
Anthony Fotu #5 DT (JC)	Recruit ratings: Scout: Rivals: 247Sports: ESPN:					
Keenan Walker (G) #8 OT	Scottsdale, AZ	Chaparral High School	6 ft 6 in (1.98 m)	282 lb (128 kg)	-	Apr 26, 2014
Keenan Walker (G) #8 OT	Recruit ratings: Scout: Rivals: 247Sports: ESPN:					
Paul Maglorie #11 S (JC)	Fort Lauderdale, FL	Arizona Western College	6 ft 2 in (1.88 m)	215 lb (98 kg)	-	May 22, 2014
Paul Maglorie #11 S (JC)	Recruit ratings: Scout: Rivals: 247Sports: ESPN:					
Dane Cruikshank #13 CB (JC)	Pomona, CA	Citrus College	6 ft 2 in (1.88 m)	190 lb (86 kg)	-	Aug 6, 2014
Dane Cruikshank #13 CB (JC)	Recruit ratings: Scout: Rivals: 247Sports: ESPN:					
Darrell Cloy Jr. #16 TE	Pico Rivera, CA	La Habra High School/Milford Academy	6 ft 3 in (1.91 m)	245 lb (111 kg)	-	Jul 27, 2013
Darrell Cloy Jr. #16 TE	Recruit ratings: Scout: Rivals: 247Sports: ESPN:					
Cody Creason #34 OG	Folsom, CA	Folsom High School	6 ft 4 in (1.93 m)	260 lb (120 kg)	-	Jul 27, 2014
Cody Creason #34 OG	Recruit ratings: Scout: Rivals: 247Sports: ESPN:					
Devon Brewer #51 CB	Fresno, CA	Central High School/Milford Academy	5 ft 10 in (1.78 m)	165 lb (75 kg)	-	Jun 5, 2013
Devon Brewer #51 CB	Recruit ratings: Scout: Rivals: 247Sports: ESPN:					
Anthony Mariscal #51 S	Bakersfield, CA	Liberty High School	5 ft 11 in (1.80 m)	188 lb (85 kg)	-	Jun 17, 2014
Anthony Mariscal #51 S	Recruit ratings: ESPN:					
Samuel Morrison #53 CB	Ashburn, VA	Gonzaga College High School	5 ft 11 in (1.80 m)	170 lb (77 kg)	-	Jun 10, 2014
Samuel Morrison #53 CB	Recruit ratings: ESPN:					
Orlando Bradford #55 RB	Shreveport, LA	Calvary Baptist Academy	5 ft 9 in (1.75 m)	200 lb (91 kg)	-	Jun 6, 2014
Orlando Bradford #55 RB	Recruit ratings: Scout: Rivals: 247Sports: ESPN:					
Harper Sherman (G) #66 OT	New Westminster, BC, Canada	New Westminster Secondary School	6 ft 4 in (1.93 m)	260 lb (120 kg)	-	Aug 1, 2014
Harper Sherman (G) #66 OT	Recruit ratings: ESPN:					
Alex Kosinski #74 OG	Larkspur, CA	Redwood High School	6 ft 4 in (1.93 m)	280 lb (130 kg)	-	
Alex Kosinski #74 OG	Recruit ratings: ESPN:					
Finton Connolly #77 DT	Gilbert, AZ	Campo Verde High School	6 ft 3 in (1.91 m)	250 lb (110 kg)	-	Nov 24, 2013
Finton Connolly #77 DT	Recruit ratings: ESPN:					
Antonio Parks (G) #84 CB	Reserve, LA	East St. John High School	5 ft 8 in (1.73 m)	171 lb (78 kg)	-	Jul 4, 2014
Antonio Parks (G) #84 CB	Recruit ratings: ESPN:					
Kendal Franklin #89 LB	New Orleans, LA	Warren Easton High School	6 ft 2 in (1.88 m)	219 lb (99 kg)	-	Jul 8, 2014
Kendal Franklin #89 LB	Recruit ratings: ESPN:					
Cedric Peterson #89 WR	Moreno Valley, CA	Rancho Verde High School	6 ft 0 in (1.83 m)	189 lb (86 kg)	-	Jun 20, 2014
Cedric Peterson #89 WR	Recruit ratings: ESPN:					
Shun Brown #92 WR	Shreveport, LA	Calvary Baptist Academy	5 ft 9 in (1.75 m)	165 lb (75 kg)	-	Oct 11, 2014
Shun Brown #92 WR	Recruit ratings: ESPN:					
Darick Holmes Jr. #105 WR	Camarillo, CA	Newbury Park High School	5 ft 6 in (1.68 m)	165 lb (75 kg)	-	Mar 29, 2014
Darick Holmes Jr. #105 WR	Recruit ratings: ESPN:					
Sharif Williams #112 DT	Fresno, CA	Central High School	6 ft 1 in (1.85 m)	290 lb (130 kg)	–	Jul 28, 2013
Sharif Williams #112 DT	Recruit ratings: Scout: Rivals: 247Sports: ESPN:					
Jace Whittaker #118 CB	Oceanside, CA	Oceanside High School	5 ft 11 in (1.80 m)	175 lb (79 kg)	-	Jun 25, 2013
Jace Whittaker #118 CB	Recruit ratings: Scout: Rivals: 247Sports: ESPN:					
Brion Anduze #125 TE–DL	Silverdale, WA	Central Kitsap High School	6 ft 4 in (1.93 m)	235 lb (107 kg)	-	Jun 20, 2014
Brion Anduze #125 TE–DL	Recruit ratings: ESPN:					
Nathan Eldridge #141 OG	Anthem, AZ	Boulder Creek High School	6 ft 4 in (1.93 m)	265 lb (120 kg)	-	Aug 9, 2014
Nathan Eldridge #141 OG	Recruit ratings: ESPN:					
Oliver Graybar; PK/P	Reno, NV	Reno High School	5 ft 10 in (1.78 m)	200 lb (91 kg)	-	
Oliver Graybar; PK/P	Recruit ratings: ESPN:					
Overall recruit ranking: Scout: #41 Rivals: #41 247Sports: #42 ESPN: #39
‡ Refers to 40-yard dash; Note: In many cases, Scout, Rivals, 247Sports, On3, and ESPN may conflict in their listings of height, weight and 40 time.; In these cases, the average was taken. ESPN grades are on a 100-point scale.; Sources: "Arizona Signee List 2015". Rivals.; "Scout.com Football Recruiting: Arizona". Scout.; "2015 Player Signees- Arizona". ESPN.; "Scout.com Team Recruiting Rankings". Scout.; "2015 Team Ranking". Rivals.com.

- Grayshirt

Early Enrollees

=== Returning starters ===
Returning players that started all or a significant number of games in the 2014 season. Arizona returns 30 starters (including fifteen on offense, twelve on defense, and three on special teams).

Offense

Player	Class	Position
Anu Solomon (12)	rsSO	QB
Nick Wilson (28)	S0	RB
Cayleb Jones (1)	rsJR	WR
Tyrell Johnson (2)	SO	WR
David Richards (4)	rsSR	WR
Trey Griffey (5)	rsJR	WR
Nate Phillips (6)	JR	WR
Samajie Grant (10)	JR	WR
Layth Friekh (58)	SO	OL
Cayman Bundage (61)	SR	OL
Carter Wood (66) †	SR	OL
T.D. Gross (70)	rsJR	OL
Jacob Alsadek (78)	rsSO	OL
Lene Maiva (77)	rsJR	OL
Freddie Tagaloa (72)	rsJR	OL

Defense

Player	Class	Position
Tellas Jones (1)	rsJR	S
Cam Denson (3)	SO	CB
Jamar Allah (7)	SR	S
Reggie Gilbert (8)	rsSR	DB
Will Parks (11)	SR	S
Devin Holiday (13)	JR	CB
DaVonte' Neal (19)	JR	CB
Anthony Lopez (28)	SR	S
Jarvis McCall Jr. (29)	rsSO	CB
Scooby Wright (33)	JR	LB
Derrick Turituri (45)	JR	LB
Jake Matthews (47)	JR	LB
Jeff Worthy (55)	rsSR	DL
Cody Ippolito (57) †	rsJR	LB
Parker Zellers (93)	rsSO	DL
Calvin Allen (94)	rsSO	DL

Special teams

Player	Class	Position
Casey Skoworon (41)	SR	K
Drew Riggleman (39)	SR	P

† Indicates player was a starter in 2014 but missed all of 2015 due to injury and Carter Wood will end of his career of the season due to injury.

=== Departures ===
The Wildcats would lose 20 seniors to graduation as well as no juniors who would choose to forgo their senior season in pursuit of an earlier NFL career. The Wildcats would lose five more players from the 2014 team due to various reasons.

Name	Position	Year	Reason
Austin Hill	WR	rsSR	Graduation/NFL (New York Jets—UFA)
Blair Tushaus	TE	rsSR	Graduation
Jared Tevis	S	rsSR	Graduation
Adonis Smith	RB	rsSR	Graduation
Jesse Scroggins	QB	rsSR	Graduation
Jonathan McKnight	CB	rsSR	Graduation
Dan Pettinato	DL	rsSR	Graduation
Brendan Murphy	CB	rsSR	Graduation
Ethan Keyserling	PK/P	rsSR	Graduation
Terris Jones-Grigsby	RB	rsSR	Graduation
Jourdon Grandon	FS	rsSR	Graduation
Mickey Bacus	C	SR	Graduation/NFL (forced him to end career from NFL)
Blake Brady	S	rsSR	Graduation
Fabbians Ebbele	OL	rsSR	Graduation
Chase Gorham	LS	SR	Graduation
Hank Hobson	LB	SR	Graduation
Tra'Mayne Bondurant	S	SR	Graduation
Carter Wood	OL	rsSR	Graduation (injury forced him to end career)
Yamen Sanders	S	SO	Transferred to Montana
Timmy Hamilton	DE	JR	Transferred to Kansas
Trevor Ermisch	S	SR	Graduation
Steven Gurrola	OL	SR	Graduation
Jordan Poland	OL	rsFR	Transferred to Arizona Western CC (after he arrest for trafficking)
Connor Brewer	QB	rsSO	Transferred to NAU and then to Virginia
Kaelin Deboskie	WR	rsFR	Transferred

=== Transfers ===
- David Catalano (from San José State)
- John Kenny (from Iowa)
- Jarek Hilgers (from Arizona State)
- Jack Kness-Knezinskis (from Scottsdale CC)

==== Offense ====
- Connor Brewer (to Virginia)
- Jordan Poland (to Arizona Western CC)
- Kaelin DeBoskie

==== Defense ====
- Yamen Sanders (to Montana)
- Timmy Hamilton (to Kansas)

=== Spring football ===
2015 Arizona Wildcats Football Spring Game – Game summary

Quarter	1	2	3	4	Total
Blue	30	36	20	0	86
White	30	30	34	0	94

at Arizona Stadium • Tucson, AZ

- Date: April 10, 2015
- Game time: 6:00 p.m. MT
- Game weather: Temperature: • Wind: • Weather:
- TV: Pac-12 Network

Game information
- Jared Baker, 3 yrd TD run
- Josh Pollack, 42 yrd field goal
- David Richards, 20 yrd td pass from Anu Solomon
- Baker, 1 yrd td run
- Casey Skowron, 28 yrd field goal
- Oliver Graybar, 24 yrd field goal
- Brandon Dawkins, 20 yrd td run
- Trevor Wood, 24 yrd td pass from Jerrad Randall
- Cayleb Jones, 10 yrd td pass from Solomon
- Jarett Mitchell, 14 yrd td run

Top passers

- Anu Solomon; 19/25 com/att, 175 yrds, 2 tds
- Jerrard Randall; 6/12 com/att, 77 yrds, 1 td

Top rushers

- Jared Barker, 8 carries, 36 yrds, 2 tds
- Jarett Mitchell, 2 carries, 14 yrds, 1 td

Top receiving

- Cayleb Jones; 3 rec, 27 yrds, 1 td
- David Richards: 2 rec, 26 yrds, 1 td
- Trevor Wood, 2 rec, 28 yrds, 1 td

Top tackler

- Paul Magloire Jr.; 9 tackles

Winter/Spring 2015 "way-too-early" pre-season rankings from most major sports news outlets, issued after the end of the 2014 season tabbed the 2015 Arizona Wildcats at No. 13 (ESPN-Martin Rickman), #14 (Sports Illustrated), #17 (CBSSports), and #13 (ESPN-Mark Schlabach).

=== Fall Camp ===
In July, the defending Pac-12 South champions Arizona Wildcats were picked to finish at fourth place in the Pac-12 preseason polls. Arizona was ranked No. 22 in both the preseason Amway (USA Today) Coaches Poll and the preseason AP Poll., with the first practice scheduled for Wednesday, Aug. 5. Camp practices are generally closed to the media and public, unless otherwise announced.

=== Depth chart ===
Defense

S
Jamar Allah (7)
Demetrius Flannigan-Fowles (12)
⋅

FS
Will Parks (11)
Paul Magloire Jr. (14)
⋅

WLB	MLB	SLB
DeAndre' Miller (32)	Scooby Wright (33)	Derrick Turituri (45)
⋅	Haden Gregory (49)	RJ Morgan (24)
⋅	⋅	⋅

SS
Tellas Jones (1)
Carter Hehr (37)
⋅

CB
Sammy Morrison (27)
Cam Denson (3)
⋅

DE	NT	DE
Reggie Gilbert (8)	Sani Fuiamano (98)	Luca Bruno (60)
Jeff Worthy (55)	Parker Zellers	Anthony Fotu (42)
⋅	⋅	⋅

CB
Davonte' Neal (19)
Kwesi Mashack (15)
⋅

Offense

WR
Cayleb Jones (1)
Trey Griffey (5)
⋅

SLOT
Nate Phillips (6)
DaVonte' Neal (19)
⋅

LT	LG	C	RG	RT
Freddie Tagaloa (72)	Zach Hemmila (65)	Cayman Bundage (61)	Jacob Alsadek (78)	Lene Maiava (77)
Layth Friekh (58)	Kaige Lawrence (75)	Levi Walton (55)	T.D. Gross (70)	Gerhard de Beer (67)
⋅	⋅	⋅	⋅	⋅

WR
Samajie Grant (10)
Tyrell Johnson (2)
Jonathan Haden (7)

WR
Austin Hill
David Richards (4)
⋅

QB
Anu Solomon (12)
Jerrard Randall (8)
Brandon Dawkins (13)

Key reserves
Trevor Wood (88) +
Cody Ippolito (57) +

RB
Nick Wilson (28)
Jared Baker (23)
Orlando Bradford (21)
⋅

Special teams
PK Casey Skowron (41)
PK Josh Pollack (9)
P Drew Riggleman (39)
P Oliver Graybar (36)
KR Samajie Grant (10)
Jared Baker (23)
PR DaVonte' Neal (19)
LS Jose Romero (54)
Nick Reinhardt (56)
H Drew Riggleman (39)

Depth Chart Source: 2015 Arizona Wildcats Football Fact Book

== Personnel ==
=== Coaching staff ===
Name	Position	Seasons at Arizona	Alma mater
Rich Rodriguez	Head coach	4	West Virginia (1986)
Calvin Magee	Associate head coach, Co-offensive coordinator, Running backs	4	South Florida (1990)
Rod Smith	Co-offensive coordinator, Quarterbacks	4	Glenville State (1997)
Jeff Casteel	Defensive coordinator, Linebackers	4	CALU (1993)
Matt Caponi	Assistant coach/safeties	4	Mount Union (2005)
Tony Dews	Assistant coach/wide receivers coach and passing game coordinator	4	Liberty (1996)
Bill Kirelawich	Assistant coach/defensive line	4	Salem (1969)
David Lockwood	Assistant coach/cornerbacks	4	West Virginia (1989)
Jim Michalczik	Assistant coach/offensive line	2	Washington State (1988)
Charlie Ragle	Assistant coach/tight ends/special teams	4	Eastern New Mexico (1998)
Matt Dudek	Director of On-Campus Recruiting and Player Personnel	4	Pittsburgh (2003)
Mike Parrish	Assistant Athletic Director, football operations	4	West Virginia (2006)
Billy Kirelawich	Director of Football Operations	4	West Virginia (2008)
Jahmile Addae	Football analyst	3	West Virginia (2005)
Dusty Rutledge	Operations Coordinator	1	Fairmont State (1991)
Chris Allen	Associate Athletic Director, strength and conditioning	4	West Virginia (2000)
Parker Whiteman	Director of Skill Development	4	Shepherd (2006)
Vincent Amey	Football analyst	3	Arizona State (1998)
Wendell Neal	Associate AD of Equipment Operations	18	Arizona (1998)
Michael Barnett	Assistant director of Equipment Operations	3	Arizona (2013)
Troy Ramsey	Assistant coach/Strength and Conditioning	2	North Texas (2007)
Ovid Goulbourne	Assistant coach/Strength and Conditioning	3	West Virginia (2009)
Miek DiAngelo	Defensive graduate assistant	3	Baldwin Wallace (2006)
Kylan Butler	Offensive graduate assistant	2	Arizona (2013)
Kyle Quinn	Offensive graduate assistant	1	Arizona (2012)
Brett Gerch	Assistant coach/Strength and Conditioning	2	Appalachian State (2000)
Miguel Reveles	Football analyst	3	La Verne (2010)
Tim Cummins	Video Coordinator	11	Arizona (2004)
Brian Riden	Assistant Video Coordinator	5	Arizona (2011)

Coaching Staff Sources: ArizonaWildcats.com

=== Roster ===
Offense Quarterbacks: 8 Jerrard Randall (C) - RS senior; 12 Anu Solomon (C) – RS sophomore; 13 Brandon Dawkins – RS freshman; 14 Zach Werlinger – RS freshman; Wide receivers: 1 Cayleb Jones - RS junior; 2 Tyrell Johnson – Sophomore; 4 David Richards (C) – RS senior; 5 Trey Griffey – RS junior; 10 Samajie Grant – Junior; 16 Shun Brown – Freshman; 18 Cedric Peterson – Freshman; 24 Darick Holmes Jr. – Freshman; 30 Johnny Jackson (C) – RS senior; 39 Tony Ellison – RS freshman; 81 Mo Mohamed - Freshman; 82 Bryant O'Georgia - Sophomore; 84 Abraham Mendivil – RS sophomore; 87 Jordan Morgan - Freshman; 89 Gabe Vasquez - Junior	Running backs: 5 Jamardre Cobb – RS freshman; 7 Jonathan Haden – RS freshman; 21 Orlando Bradford – Freshman; 23 Jared Baker (C) – RS senior; 28 Nick Wilson – Sophomore; 31 Weston Barlow - Freshman; 32 Khaylub Thompson - Freshman; 34 Zach Green – RS sophomore; 38 Branden Leon – Freshman; 40 Jarett Mitchell – RS freshman; Offensive lineman: 53 Chase Hanlon – RS junior; 55 Levi Walton – RS freshman; 58 Layth Friekh – RS freshman; 59 Christian Lopez – Freshman; 61 Cayman Bundage – Senior; 62 Aiulua Fanene – RS junior; 64 Nathan Elridge – Freshman; 65 Zach Hemmila – RS junior; 67 Gerhard de Beer – RS sophomore; 68 David Catalano – RS senior; 69 Christian Boettcher – Senior; 70 T.D. Gross – RS junior; 72 Freddie Tagaloa – RS junior; 73 Jack Knees-Knezinskis – Junior; 74 Alex Kosinski – Freshman; 75 Kaige Lawrence (C) – RS senior; 76 Cody Creason – Freshman; 77 Lene Maiava (C) – RS senior; 78 Jacob Alsadek – RS sophomore	Tight ends: 15 Matt Morin – Junior; 17 Josh Kern – RS junior; 48 Brian Anduze – Freshman; 88 Trevor Wood – Sophomore; Defense Defensive lineman: 8 Reggie Gilbert (C) – RS senior; 42 Anthony Fotu – Junior; 55 Jeff Worthy (C) – Senior; 60 Luca Bruno – RS sophomore; 86 Justin Belknap - Junior; 90 Shariff Williams – Freshman; 91 Finton Connolly – Freshman; 92 Jack Banda – RS sophomore; 93 Parker Zellers – RS sophomore; 94 Calvin Allen – RS sophomore; 96 Marcus Griffin – RS freshman; 98 Roc Russell – RS sophomore; 99 Sani Fuimaono – Junior; Linebackers: 2 Marquis Ware - RS freshman; 4 Antonio Smothers – Senior; 18 Brandon Rutt – RS freshman; 24 RJ Morgan – RS sophomore; 32 DeAndre' Miller – RS sophomore; 33 Scooby Wright – Junior; 43 Kendal Franklin – Freshman; 45 Derrick Turituri – Junior; 47 Jake Matthews - Junior; 48 Kevin Hamlett Jr. - RS freshman; 49 Hayden Gregory- RS senior; 50 Carrington Vaughn – Freshman; 51 Jason Sweet - RS junior; 52 Alex King - RS junior; 53 Sir Thomas Jackson – RS senior; 54 Rob Kleifield - Freshman; 57 Coy Ippolito - RS junior; 58 Tre Taylor - Sophomore; 59 Matthew Stagg - RS junior	Cornerbacks: 3 Cam Denson – Sophomore; 9 Dane Cruikshank – Junior; 10 Malcolm Holland – Freshman; 13 Devin Holiday – Junior; 15 Kwesi Mashack - RS freshman; 17 Jace Whittaker – Freshman; 19 DaVonte' Neal – RS junior; 23 Devon Brewer – Freshman; 27 Samuel Morrison – Freshman; 29 Jarvis McCall Jr. – RS sophomore; 35 Isaiah Strong - RS sophomore; 40 Malik Moody – Freshman; 44 Aaron Almond - Freshman; Safeties: 1 Tellas Jones - RS junior; 7 Jamar Allah (C) - Senior; 11 Will Parks (C) – Senior; 12 Demetrius Flanigan-Fowles - Freshman; 14 Paul Magloire – Junior; 20 Jared Hilgers – RS sophomore; 25 Anthony Mariscal – Freshman; 26 Nick Fadelli – Freshman; 28 Anthony Lopez (C) – Senior; 31 Patrick Stevens - Freshman; 34 Thomas Sawyer - Freshman; 36 Samir Hinn - Freshman; 37 Carter Hehr - RS sophomore; 38 Trevor Niemann – RS senior; 41 Francisco Diochea III - Freshman; 46 Albert Green – Freshman; Special teams Punters: 26 Matt Aragon - Freshman; 39 Drew Riggleman (C) – RS senior; Kickers: 9 Josh Pollack – Sophomore; 36 Oliver Graybar – Freshman; 41 Casey Skowron (C) – RS senior; Long snappers: 54 Jose Romero – RS senior; 56 Nick Reinhardt – RS freshman; 63 Griffin Goudreau - Senior
Sources: 2015 Arizona Wildcats roster

== Regular season ==
=== Schedule ===
The 2015 Pac-12 schedule was officially released on September 16, 2014. On April 10, 2015, the Wildcats will play the White and Navy Blue game, the program's annual spring game. Arizona Wildcats will play four of nine games, against all four North Division schools: Oregon State, Stanford, Washington and Washington State. They will also play against five South Division opponents: Arizona State, Colorado, USC, UCLA and Utah. For their non-conference slate the Wildcats will play two of three games against UTSA of the Conference USA, Nevada of the Mountain West Conference and Northern Arizona of the FCS' Big Sky Conference. For the first year, the Cats face neither California and Oregon. The Wildcats will play all twelve games without a bye week for first time ever.

The Wildcats opened the 2015 season with a non-conference trip to Reno, Nevada, to face Nevada, its first since 1921, and is the return game in a home-and-home series that brought the Wolf Pack to Tucson in 2014. In other non-conference action, Arizona hosted in-state foe: Northern Arizona.

Date	Time	Opponent	Rank	Site	TV	Result	Attendance
September 3	7:00 p.m.	UTSA*	No. 22	Arizona Stadium; Tucson, AZ	P12N	W 42–32	51,111
September 12	4:00 p.m.	at Nevada*	No. 22	Mackay Stadium; Reno, NV	CBSSN	W 44–20	24,355
September 19	8:00 p.m.	No. 24 (FCS) Northern Arizona*	No. 20	Arizona Stadium; Tucson, AZ	P12N	W 77–13	51,494
September 26	5:00 p.m.	No. 9 UCLA	No. 16	Arizona Stadium; Tucson, AZ (College GameDay)	ABC	L 30–56	56,004
October 3	7:30 p.m.	at No. 18 Stanford		Stanford Stadium; Stanford, CA	P12N	L 17–55	46,628
October 10	1:00 p.m.	Oregon State		Arizona Stadium; Tucson, AZ (Family Weekend)	FS1	W 44–7	52,987
October 17	6:00 p.m.	at Colorado		Folsom Field; Boulder, CO	FS1	W 38–31	39,666
October 24	1:00 p.m.	Washington State^{†}		Arizona Stadium; Tucson, AZ	P12N	L 42–45	47,847
October 31	8:00 p.m.	at Washington		Alaska Airlines Field at Husky Stadium; Seattle, WA	FS1	L 3–49	50,667
November 7	8:30 p.m.	at USC		Los Angeles Memorial Coliseum; Los Angeles, CA	ESPN	L 30–38	76,309
November 14	8:00 p.m.	No. 10 Utah		Arizona Stadium; Tucson, AZ	FS1	W 37–30 ^{2OT}	48,912
November 21	1:30 p.m.	at Arizona State		Sun Devil Stadium; Tempe, AZ (Territorial Cup)	FS1	L 37–52	64,885
December 19	Noon	at New Mexico*		University Stadium; Albuquerque, NM (New Mexico Bowl; rivalry)	ESPN	W 45–37	30,289
*Non-conference game; ^{†}Homecoming; Rankings from AP Poll released prior to the game; All times are in Mountain time

Schedule source: FBschedules.com

Legend
Arizona win
Arizona loss

=== vs UTSA ===
UTSA Roadrunners (0–0) vs No. 22 Arizona Wildcats (0–0) – Game summary

Quarter	1	2	3	4	Total
Roadrunners	0	20	6	6	32
#22 Wildcats	14	7	14	7	42

at Arizona Stadium • Tucson, AZ

- Date: September 3, 2015
- Game time: 7:00 p.m. MST
- Game weather: Cloudy and drizzle, 70 °F (21 °C)
- Game attendance: 51,111
- Referee: Chris Coyte
- TV: Pac-12 Network

Game information

First quarter

- (14:25) ARIZ – Anthony Lopez 23-yard interception return, Casey Skowron kick (Arizona 7–0)
- (2:07) ARIZ – David Richards 6-yard pass from Anu Solomon, Casey Skowron kick (Drive: 11 plays, 80 yards, 3:07; Arizona 14–0)

Second quarter

- (12:39) UTSA – Daniel Portillo 19-yard field goal (Drive: 13 plays, 77 yards, 4:21; Arizona 14–3)
- (10:09) UTSA – David Morgan II 6-yard pass from Blake Bogenschutz, Daniel Portillo kick (Drive: 7 plays, 30 yards, 2:23; Arizona 14–10)
- (9:05) ARIZ – Johnny Jackson 21-yard pass from Anu Solomon, Casey Skowron kick (Drive: 6 plays, 75 yards, 1:04; Arizona 21–10)
- (4:35) UTSA – Daniel Portillo 33-yard field goal (Drive: 8 plays, 46 yards, 2:28; Arizona 21–13)
- (0:39) UTSA – Blake Bogenschutz 2-yard run, Daniel Portillo kick (Drive: 7 plays, 70 yards, 1:47; Arizona 21–20)

Third quarter

- (7:14) ARIZ – Nate Phillips 4-yard pass from Anu Solomon, Casey Skowron kick (Drive: 16 plays, 81 yards, 4:55; Arizona 28–20)
- (5:57) ARIZ – Jamar Allah 22-yard fumble return, Casey Skowron kick (Arizona 35–20)
- (2:36) UTSA – Aron Taylor 32-yard pass from Blake Bogenschutz, kick failed (Drive: 9 plays, 75 yards, 3:21; Arizona 35–26)

Fourth quarter

- (11:46) ARIZ – Cayleb Jones 4-yard pass from Anu Solomon, Casey Skowron kick (Drive: 4 plays, 55 yards, 1:50; Arizona 42–26)
- (7:13) UTSA – Jalen Rhodes 16-yard run, pass failed (Drive: 9 plays, 79 yards, 4:27; Arizona 42–32)

Statistics	UTSA	ARIZ
First downs	29	25
Total yards	525	329
Rushing yards	50–193	38–163
Passing yards	332	229
Passing: Comp–Att–Int	25–45–1	22–36–0
Time of possession	35:09	24:51

Team	Category	Player	Statistics
UTSA	Passing	Blake Bogenschutz	25/43, 332 yards, 2 TD, INT
UTSA	Rushing	Jarveon Williams	21 carries, 79 yards
UTSA	Receiving	David Morgan II	9 receptions, 109 yards, TD
Arizona	Passing	Anu Solomon	22/36, 229 yards, 4 TD
Arizona	Rushing	Nick Wilson	22 carries, 97 yards
Arizona	Receiving	Johnny Jackson	8 receptions, 101 yards, TD

=== at Nevada ===
No. 22 Arizona Wildcats (1–0) at Nevada Wolf Pack (1–0) – Game summary

Quarter	1	2	3	4	Total
#22 Wildcats	14	7	13	10	44
Wolf Pack	3	10	0	7	20

at Mackay Stadium • Reno, NV

- Date: September 12, 2015
- Game time: 4:00 p.m. PST
- Game weather: Hazy, 94 °F (34 °C)
- Game attendance: 24,355
- Referee: July Marvel
- TV: CBS Sports Network

Game information

First quarter

- (13:01) ARIZ – Johnny Jackson 9-yard pass from Anu Solomon, Casey Skowron kick (Drive: 2 plays, 16 yards, 0:34; Arizona 7–0)
- (9:33) ARIZ – Nick Wilson 3-yard run, Casey Skowron kick (Drive: 7 plays, 77 yards, 2:02; Arizona 14–0)
- (5:08) NEV – Brent Zuzo 28-yard field goal (Drive: 11 plays, 64 yards, 4:25; Arizona 14–3)

Second quarter

- (9:14) NEV – Jerico Richardson 5-yard pass from Tyler Stewart, Brent Zuzo kick (Drive: 14 plays, 81 yards, 5:28; Arizona 14–10)
- (3:56) ARIZ – Nick Wilson 3-yard run, Casey Skowron kick (Drive: 5 plays, 40 yards, 1:10; Arizona 21–10)
- (0:00) NEV – Brent Zuzo 41-yard field goal (Drive: 8 plays, 26 yards, 0:56; Arizona 21–13)

Third quarter

- (10:41) ARIZ – Jamardre Cobb 1-yard pass from Anu Solomon, kick failed (Drive: 7 plays, 58 yards, 1:59; Arizona 27–13)
- (3:56) ARIZ – Nick Wilson 6-yard run, Casey Skowron kick (Drive: 9 plays, 77 yards, 2:30; Arizona 34–13)

Fourth quarter

- (13:34) ARIZ – Jerrard Randall 57-yard run, Casey Skowron kick (Drive: 2 plays, 56 yards, 0:33; Arizona 41–13)
- (10:08) NEV – Hasaan Henderson 2-yard pass from Tyler Stewart, Brent Zuzo kcik (Drive: 9 plays, 66 yards, 3:19; Arizona 41–20)
- (3:35) ARIZ – Casey Skowron 46-yard field goal (Drive: 10 plays, 46 yards, 6:33; Arizona 44–20)

Statistics	ARIZ	NEV
First downs	25	15
Total yards	571	328
Rushing yards	43–290	42–168
Passing yards	281	160
Passing: Comp–Att–Int	25–35–0	18–34–1
Time of possession	27:42	32:18

Team	Category	Player	Statistics
Arizona	Passing	Anu Solomon	24/34, 276 yards, 2 TD
Arizona	Rushing	Nick Wilson	21 carries, 183 yards, 3 TD
Arizona	Receiving	Cayleb Jones	5 receptions, 100 yards
Nevada	Passing	Tyler Stewart	18/32, 160 yards, 2 TD, INT
Nevada	Rushing	Don Jackson	24 carries, 91 yards
Nevada	Receiving	Hasaan Henderson	6 receptions, 58 yards, TD

=== vs Northern Arizona ===
Northern Arizona Lumberjacks (2–0) vs No. 20 Arizona Wildcats (2–0) – Game summary

Quarter	1	2	3	4	Total
Lumberjacks	6	7	0	0	13
#20 Wildcats	7	35	14	21	77

at Arizona Stadium • Tucson, AZ

- Date: September 19, 2015
- Game time: 8:00 p.m. MST
- Game weather: Partly cloudy, 80 °F (27 °C)
- Game attendance: 51,494
- Referee: Land Clark
- TV: Pac-12 Network

Game information

First quarter

- (10:01) NAU – Ryan Hawkins 39-yard field goal (Drive: 9 plays, 49 yards, 4:59; Northern Arizona 3–0)
- (8:06) ARIZ – Anu Solomon 1-yard run, Casey Skowron kick (Drive: 6 plays, 51 yards, 1:47; Arizona 7–3)
- (6:21) NAU – Ryan Hawkins 21-yard field goal (Drive: 5 plays, 72 yards, 1:45; Arizona 7–6)

Second quarter

- (14:19) ARIZ – Samajie Grant 8-yard pass from Anu Solomon, Casey Skowron kick (Drive: 10 plays, 72 yards, 3:03; Arizona 14–6)
- (11:52) NAU – Emmanuel Butler 62-yard pass from Case Cookus, Ryan Hawkins kick (Drive: 6 plays, 75 yards, 2:27; Arizona 14–13)
- (10:25) ARIZ – David Richards 27-yard pass from Anu Solomon, Casey Skowron kick (Drive: 6 plays, 75 yards, 1:27; Arizona 21–13)
- (8:35) ARIZ – Nick Wilson 1-yard run, Casey Skowron kick (Drive: 3 plays, 37 yards, 1:09; Arizona 28–13)
- (3:33) ARIZ – David Richards 14-yard pass from Anu Solomon, Casey Skowron kick (Drive: 9 plays, 67 yards, 2:34; Arizona 35–13)
- (0:14) ARIZ – Nick Wilson 1-yard run, Casey Skowron kick (Drive: 11 plays, 61 yards, 1:39; Arizona 42–13)

Third quarter

- (11:17) ARIZ – Johnny Jackson 13-yard pass from Anu Solomon, Casey Skowron kick (Drive: 5 plays, 63 yards, 1:58; Arizona 49–13)
- (7:24) ARIZ – Jerrard Randall 72-yard run, Casey Skowron kick (Drive: 1 play, 72 yards, 0:12; Arizona 56–13)

Fourth quarter

- (13:50) ARIZ – Jerrard Randall 73-yard run, Casey Skowron kick (Drive: 5 plays, 91 yards, 2:08; Arizona 63–13)
- (9:54) ARIZ – Brandon Dawkins 43-yard run, Casey Skowron kick (Drive: 4 plays, 91 yards, 1:11; Arizona 70–13)
- (5:45) ARIZ – Zach Werlinger 11-yard run, Josh Pollack kick (Drive: 6 plays, 53 yards, 2:11; Arizona 77–13)

Statistics	NAU	ARIZ
First downs	14	37
Total yards	346	792
Rushing yards	43–75	42–499
Passing yards	271	293
Passing: Comp–Att–Int	16–26–3	26–39–0
Time of possession	35:57	24:03

Team	Category	Player	Statistics
Northern Arizona	Passing	Case Cookus	8/13, 190 yards, TD, INT
Northern Arizona	Rushing	Nick Butler	7 carries, 33 yards
Northern Arizona	Receiving	Emmanuel Butler	5 receptions, 119 yards, TD
Arizona	Passing	Anu Solomon	25/35, 285 yards, 4 TD
Arizona	Rushing	Jerrard Randall	3 carries, 149 yards, 2 TD
Arizona	Receiving	David Richards	8 receptions, 120 yards, 2 TD

=== vs No. 9 UCLA ===
No. 9 UCLA Bruins (3–0) vs No. 16 Arizona Wildcats (3–0) – Game summary

Quarter	1	2	3	4	Total
#9 Bruins	14	28	7	7	56
#16 Wildcats	7	7	9	7	30

at Arizona Stadium • Tucson, AZ

- Date: September 26, 2015
- Game time: 5:00 p.m.
- Game weather: Clear, 97 °F (36 °C)
- Game attendance: 56,004
- Referee: Mark Duddy
- TV: ABC

Game information

First quarter

- (12:20) ARIZ – Nate Phillips 34-yard pass from Anu Solomon, Casey Skowron kick (Drive: 10 plays, 75 yards, 2:40; Arizona 7–0)
- (9:59) UCLA – Thomas Duarte 35-yard pass from Josh Rosen, Ka'imi Fairbairn kick (Drive: 5 plays, 45 yards, 2:12; Tied 7–7)
- (8:31) UCLA – Paul Perkins 16-yard run, Ka'imi Fairbairn kick (Drive: 1 play, 16 yards, 0:07; UCLA 14–7)

Second quarter

- (14:36) UCLA – Paul Perkins 1-yard run, Ka'imi Fairbairn kick (Drive: 7 plays, 50 yards, 2:27; UCLA 21–7)
- (12:20) UCLA – Jordan Payton 5-yard pass from Josh Rosen, Ka'imi Fairbairn kick (Drive: 5 plays, 30 yards, 1:32; UCLA 28–7)
- (10:34) ARIZ – Jerrard Randall 39-yard run, Casey Skowron kick (Drive: 5 plays, 75 yards, 1:46; UCLA 28–14)
- (6:41) UCLA – Nate Starks 3-yard run, Ka'imi Fairbairn kick (Drive: 10 plays, 75 yards, 3:53; UCLA 35–14)
- (3:08) UCLA – Paul Perkins 1-yard run, Ka'imi Fairbairn kick (Drive: 6 plays, 64 yards, 2:25; UCLA 42–14)

Third quarter

- (11:05) ARIZ – David Richards 16-yard pass from Jerrard Randall, kick failed (Drive: 8 plays, 44 yards, 2:09; UCLA 42–20)
- (5:54) ARIZ – Casey Skowron 44-yard field goal (Drive: 11 plays, 24 yards, 3:51; UCLA 42–23)
- (3:39) UCLA – Josh Rosen 8-yard run, Ka'imi Fairbairn kick (Drive: 8 plays, 75 yards, 2:15; UCLA 49–23)

Fourth quarter

- (3:37) UCLA – Soso Jamabo 10-yard run, Ka'imi Fairbairn kick (Drive: 11 plays, 88 yards, 5:55; UCLA 56–23)
- (1:12) ARIZ – Jared Baker 2-yard run, Casey Skowron kick (Drive: 8 plays, 75 yards, 2:25; UCLA 56–30)

Statistics	UCLA	ARIZ
First downs	23	32
Total yards	497	468
Rushing yards	47–213	59–353
Passing yards	284	115
Passing: Comp–Att–Int	19–28–0	10–28–1
Time of possession	31:55	28:05

Team	Category	Player	Statistics
UCLA	Passing	Josh Rosen	19/28, 284 yards, 2 TD
UCLA	Rushing	Soso Jamabo	9 carries, 96 yards, TD
UCLA	Receiving	Jordan Payton	7 receptions, 136 yards, TD
Arizona	Passing	Anu Solomon	4/10, 55 yards, TD
Arizona	Rushing	Nick Wilson	24 carries, 136 yards
Arizona	Receiving	Cayleb Jones	4 receptions, 44 yards

=== at No. 18 Stanford ===
Arizona Wildcats (3–1) at No. 18 Stanford Cardinal (3–1) – Game summary

Quarter	1	2	3	4	Total
Wildcats	0	3	14	0	17
#18 Cardinal	13	14	21	7	55

at Stanford Stadium • Stanford, CA

- Date: October 3, 2015
- Game time: 7:30 p.m. PST
- Game weather: Perfect, 62 °F (17 °C)
- Game attendance: 46,628
- Referee: Terry Leyden
- TV: Pac-12 Network

Game information

First quarter

- (10:50) STAN – Conrad Ukropina 38-yard field goal (Drive: 9 plays, 43 yards, 4:10; Stanford 3–0)
- (5:31) STAN – Conrad Ukropina 41-yard field goal (Drive: 7 plays, 65 yards, 3:42; Stanford 6–0)
- (0:48) STAN – Christian McCaffrey 4-yard run, Conrad Ukropina kick (Drive: 7 plays, 63 yards, 3:31; Stanford 13–0)

Second quarter

- (8:44) ARIZ – Casey Skowron 26-yard field goal (Drive: 20 plays, 73 yards, 7:04; Stanford 13–3)
- (3:45) STAN – Remound Wright 1-yard run, Conrad Ukropina kick (Drive: 10 plays, 69 yards, 4:59; Stanford 20–3)
- (1:19) STAN – Remound Wright 16-yard pass from Kevin Hogan, Conrad Ukropina kick (Drive: 4 plays, 73 yards, 1:15; Stanford 27–3)

Third quarter

- (12:17) ARIZ – Johnny Jackson 15-yard pass from Jerrard Randall, Casey Skowron kick (Drive: 8 plays, 75 yards, 2:43; Stanford 27–10)
- (7:56) STAN – Remound Wright 1-yard run, Conrad Ukropina kick (Drive: 7 plays, 29 yards, 4:21; Stanford 34–10)
- (4:39) STAN – Michael Rector 18-yard pass from Kevin Hogan, Conrad Ukropina kick (Drive: 5 plays, 77 yards, 2:28; Stanford 41–10)
- (1:43) ARIZ – Nick Wilson 1-yard run, Casey Skowron kick (Drive: 11 plays, 73 yards, 2:56; Stanford 41–17)
- (1:25) STAN – Barry J. Sanders 65-yard run, Conrad Ukropina kick (Drive: 1 play, 65 yards, 0:18; Stanford 48–17)

Fourth quarter

- (4:03) STAN – Rollins Stallworth 6-yard pass from Keller Chryst, Conrad Ukropina kick (Drive: 11 plays, 57 yards, 6:44; Stanford 55–17)

Statistics	ARIZ	STAN
First downs	16	30
Total yards	314	570
Rushing yards	34–118	46–314
Passing yards	196	256
Passing: Comp–Att–Int	17–33–0	21–23–0
Time of possession	22:41	37:19

Team	Category	Player	Statistics
Arizona	Passing	Jerrard Randall	15/28, 178 yards, TD
Arizona	Rushing	Jerrard Randall	9 carries, 67 yards
Arizona	Receiving	Johnny Jackson	5 receptions, 84 yards, TD
Stanford	Passing	Kevin Hogan	17/19, 217 yards, 2 TD
Stanford	Rushing	Christian McCaffrey	17 carries, 156 yards, TD
Stanford	Receiving	Michael Rector	4 receptions, 72 yards, TD

=== vs Oregon State ===
Oregon State Beavers (2–2) vs Arizona Wildcats (3–2) – Game summary

Quarter	1	2	3	4	Total
Beavers	0	7	0	0	7
Wildcats	13	21	10	0	44

at Arizona Stadium • Tucson, AZ

- Date: October 10, 2015
- Game time: 1:00 p.m. MST
- Game weather: Sunny, 90 °F (32 °C)
- Game attendance: 52,987
- Referee: Steve Strimling
- TV: FS1

Game information

First quarter

- (13:02) ARIZ – Nick Wilson 3-yard run, Casey Skowron kick (Drive: 9 plays, 75 yards, 1:58; Arizona 7–0)
- (5:19) ARIZ – Casey Skowron 37-yard field goal (Drive: 6 plays, 74 yards, 1:58; Arizona 10–0)
- (0:52) ARIZ – Casey Skowron 27-yard field goal (Drive: 9 plays, 61 yards, 2:48; Arizona 13–0)

Second quarter

- (10:59) OSU – Seth Collins 17-yard run, Garrett Owens kick (Drive: 12 plays, 88 yards, 4:46; Arizona 13–7)
- (10:17) ARIZ – Nick Wilson 7-yard run, Casey Skowron kick (Drive: 2 plays, 77 yards, 0:35; Arizona 20–7)
- (9:06) ARIZ – Orlando Bradford 1-yard run, Casey Skowron kick (Drive: 1 play, 1 yard, 0:04; Arizona 27–7)
- (3:44) ARIZ – Orlando Bradford 2-yard run, Casey Skowron kick (Drive: 15 plays, 65 yards, 4:36; Arizona 34–7)

Third quarter

- (9:25) ARIZ – Casey Skowron 20-yard field goal (Drive: 10 plays, 76 yards, 3:23; Arizona 37–7)
- (4:37) ARIZ – Orlando Bradford 6-yard run, Casey Skowron kick (Drive: 6 plays, 45 yards, 2:32; Arizona 44–7)

Fourth quarter

No scoring plays

Statistics	OSU	ARIZ
First downs	15	27
Total yards	249	644
Rushing yards	31–151	58–368
Passing yards	98	276
Passing: Comp–Att–Int	12–35–1	17–30–0
Time of possession	24:14	35:46

Team	Category	Player	Statistics
Oregon State	Passing	Seth Collins	8/24, 56 yards, INT
Oregon State	Rushing	Storm Woods	9 carries, 60 yards
Oregon State	Receiving	Victor Bolden	3 receptions, 34 yards
Arizona	Passing	Anu Solomon	17/30, 276 yards
Arizona	Rushing	Jared Baker	10 carries, 123 yards
Arizona	Receiving	Johnny Jackson	3 receptions, 92 yards

=== at Colorado ===
Arizona Wildcats (4–2) at Colorado Buffaloes (3–3) – Game summary

Quarter	1	2	3	4	Total
Wildcats	17	0	0	21	38
Buffaloes	7	10	7	7	31

at Folsom Field • Boulder, CO

- Date: October 17, 2015
- Game time: 6:00 p.m. MST
- Game weather: Mostly clear, 63 °F (17 °C)
- Game attendance: 39,666
- Referee: Michael Batlan
- TV: FS1

Game information

First quarter

- (14:01) ARIZ – Casey Skowron 48-yard field goal (Drive: 6 plays, 44 yards, 0:59; Arizona 3–0)
- (10:15) ARIZ – Jared Baker 79-yard run, Casey Skowron kick (Drive: 2 plays, 82 yards, 0:32; Arizona 10–0)
- (9:31) COLO – Shay Fields 72-yard pass from Sefo Liufau, Diego Gonzalez kick (Drive: 2 plays, 74 yards, 0:37; Arizona 10–7)
- (7:53) ARIZ – Josh Kern 5-yard pass from Anu Solomon, Casey Skowron kick (Drive: 6 plays, 75 yards, 1:38; Arizona 17–7)

Second quarter

- (13:30) COLO – Diego Gonzalez 20-yard field goal (Drive: 12 plays, 48 yards, 5:10; Arizona 17–10)
- (2:26) COLO – Sefo Liufau 2-yard run, Diego Gonzalez kick (Drive: 5 plays, 24 yards, 1:55; Tied 17–17)

Third quarter

- (11:51) COLO – Sefo Liufau 4-yard run, Diego Gonzalez kick (Drive: 8 plays, 75 yards, 3:04; Colorado 24–17)

Fourth quarter

- (14:24) ARIZ – Jared Baker 45-yard run, Casey Skowron kick (Drive: 6 plays, 97 yards, 1:30; Tied 24–24)
- (9:17) ARIZ – Jared Baker 25-yard pass from Anu Solomon, Casey Skowron kick (Drive: 8 plays, 94 yards, 2:44; Arizona 31–24)
- (4:40) ARIZ – Jerrard Randall 1-yard run, Casey Skowron kick (Drive: 7 plays, 35 yards, 2:40; Arizona 38–24)
- (2:19) COLO – Shay Fields 30-yard pass from Sefo Liufau, Diego Gonzalez kick (Drive: 11 plays, 73 yards, 2:14; Arizona 38–31)

Statistics	ARIZ	COLO
First downs	26	22
Total yards	616	467
Rushing yards	44–291	43–128
Passing yards	325	339
Passing: Comp–Att–Int	25–40–0	28–44–0
Time of possession	26:58	33:02

Team	Category	Player	Statistics
Arizona	Passing	Anu Solomon	22/37, 283 yards, 2 TD
Arizona	Rushing	Jared Baker	23 carries, 207 yards, 2 TD
Arizona	Receiving	Nate Phillips	6 receptions, 106 yards
Colorado	Passing	Sefo Liufau	28/43, 339 yards, 2 TD
Colorado	Rushing	Phillip Lindsay	23 carries, 91 yards
Colorado	Receiving	Shay Fields	8 receptions, 168 yards, 2 TD

=== vs Washington State ===
Washington State Cougars (4–2) vs Arizona Wildcats (5–2) – Game summary

Quarter	1	2	3	4	Total
Cougars	14	17	7	7	45
Wildcats	0	21	7	14	42

at Arizona Stadium • Tucson, AZ

- Date: October 24, 2015
- Game time: 1:00 p.m. MST
- Game weather: Clear, 83 °F (28 °C)
- Game attendance: 47,847
- Referee: Michael Mothershed
- TV: Pac-12 Network

Game information

First quarter

- (10:28) WSU – Gabe Marks 6-yard pass from Luke Falk, Erik Powell kick (Drive: 10 plays, 78 yards, 4:32; Washington State 7–0)
- (2:46) WSU – Gabe Marks 43-yard pass from Luke Falk, Erik Powell kick (Drive: 4 plays, 80 yards, 1:09; Washington State 14–0)

Second quarter

- (14:30) ARIZ – Jared Baker 1-yard run, Casey Skowron kick (Drive: 13 plays, 75 yards, 3:16; Washington State 14–7)
- (12:02) ARIZ – Nate Phillips 69-yard punt return, Casey Skowron kick (Tied 14–14)
- (8:19) WSU – Gabe Marks 2-yard pass from Luke Falk, Erik Powell kick (Drive: 9 plays, 78 yards, 3:45; Washington State 21–14)
- (6:51) WSU – Kyrin Priester 6-yard pass from Luke Falk, Erik Powell kick (Drive: 4 plays, 23 yards, 1:21; Washington State 28–14)
- (4:22) ARIZ – Jared Baker 7-yard run, Casey Skowron kick (Drive: 8 plays, 81 yards, 2:21; Washington State 28–21)
- (0:24) WSU – Erik Powell 25-yard field goal (Drive: 13 plays, 67 yards, 3:58; Washington State 31–21)

Third quarter

- (8:34) WSU – Gerard Wicks 1-yard run, Erik Powell kick (Drive: 11 plays, 84 yards, 5:18; Washington State 38–21)
- (0:22) ARIZ – Cayleb Jones 3-yard pass from Jerrard Randall, Casey Skowron kick (Drive: 11 plays, 80 yards, 3:48; Washington State 38–28)

Fourth quarter

- (8:07) ARIZ – Jared Baker 6-yard run, Casey Skowron kick (Drive: 12 plays, 67 yards, 4:11; Washington State 38–35)
- (2:03) WSU – Gabe Marks 9-yard pass from Luke Falk, Erik Powell kick (Drive: 11 plays, 76 yards, 5:58; Washington State 45–35)
- (0:44) ARIZ – Johnny Jackson 20-yard pass from Jerrard Randall, Casey Skowron kick (Drive: 5 plays, 75 yards, 1:19; Washington State 45–42)

Statistics	WSU	ARIZ
First downs	34	24
Total yards	631	483
Rushing yards	31–117	32–176
Passing yards	514	307
Passing: Comp–Att–Int	47–62–0	24–37–0
Time of possession	37:53	22:07

Team	Category	Player	Statistics
Washington State	Passing	Luke Falk	47/62, 514 yards, 5 TD
Washington State	Rushing	Jamal Morrow	5 carries, 59 yards
Washington State	Receiving	River Cracraft	8 receptions, 102 yards
Arizona	Passing	Anu Solomon	12/20, 145 yards
Arizona	Rushing	Jerrard Randall	10 carries, 105 yards
Arizona	Receiving	Cayleb Jones	8 receptions, 131 yards, TD

=== at Washington ===
Arizona Wildcats (5–3) at Washington Huskies (3–4) – Game summary

Quarter	1	2	3	4	Total
Wildcats	3	0	0	0	3
Huskies	7	14	21	7	49

at Husky Stadium • Seattle, WA

- Date: October 31, 2015
- Game time: 8:00 p.m. PST
- Game weather: Cloudy, 55 °F (13 °C)
- Game attendance: 56,749
- Referee: Mark Duddy
- TV: FS1

Game information

First quarter

- (9:39) ARIZ – Casey Skowron 27-yard field goal (Drive: 15 plays, 65 yards, 5:21; Arizona 3–0)
- (1:14) WASH – Dwayne Washington 13-yard pass from Jake Browning, Cameron Van Winkle kick (Drive: 6 plays, 80 yards, 2:43; Washington 7–3)

Second quarter

- (9:29) WASH – Joshua Perkins 13-yard pass from Jake Browning, Cameron Van Winkle kick (Drive: 7 plays, 53 yards, 3:23; Washington 14–3)
- (0:54) WASH – Brayden Lenius 5-yard pass from Jake Browning, Cameron Van Winkle kick (Drive: 6 plays, 63 yards, 1:31; Washington 21–3)

Third quarter

- (13:06) WASH – Dante Pettis 31-yard pass from Jake Browning, Cameron Van Winkle kick (Drive: 5 plays, 75 yards, 1:54; Washington 28–3)
- (5:40) WASH – Jake Browning 12-yard run, Cameron Van Winkle kick (Drive: 3 plays, 21 yards, 1:14; Washington 35–3)
- (0:43) WASH – Dwayne Washington 69-yard run, Cameron Van Winkle kick (Drive: 3 plays, 80 yards, 1:17; Washington 42–3)

Fourth quarter

- (5:50) WASH – Jeff Lindquist 8-yard run, Cameron Van Winkle kick (Drive: 11 plays, 82 yards, 6:17; Washington 49–3)

Statistics	ARIZ	WASH
First downs	22	22
Total yards	330	468
Rushing yards	44–127	36–201
Passing yards	203	267
Passing: Comp–Att–Int	25–42–3	17–25–0
Time of possession	32:06	27:54

Team	Category	Player	Statistics
Arizona	Passing	Anu Solomon	18/31, 160 yards, 2 INT
Arizona	Rushing	Jared Baker	19 carries, 67 yards
Arizona	Receiving	Nate Phillips	3 receptions, 56 yards
Washington	Passing	Jake Browning	16/24, 263 yards, 4 TD
Washington	Rushing	Dwayne Washington	4 carries, 77 yards, TD
Washington	Receiving	Joshua Perkins	4 receptions, 58 yards, TD

=== at USC ===
Arizona Wildcats (5–4) at USC Trojans (5–3) – Game summary

Quarter	1	2	3	4	Total
Wildcats	7	10	3	10	30
Trojans	0	17	0	21	38

at Los Angeles Memorial Coliseum • Los Angeles, CA

- Date: November 7, 2015
- Game time: 8:30 p.m. PST
- Game weather: Calm, 64 °F (18 °C)
- Game attendance: 76,309
- Referee: Chris Coyte
- TV: ESPN

Game information

First quarter

- (5:46) ARIZ – Nate Phillips 9-yard pass from Anu Solomon, Casey Skowron kick (Drive: 6 plays, 55 yards, 2:13; Arizona 7–0)

Second quarter

- (14:56) ARIZ – David Richards 3-yard pass from Anu Solomon, Casey Skowron kick (Drive: 7 plays, 60 yards, 1:37; Arizona 14–0)
- (11:35) USC – Alex Wood 25-yard field goal (Drive: 8 plays, 65 yards, 3:18; Arizona 14–3)
- (9:15) USC – JuJu Smith-Schuster 72-yard pass from Cody Kessler, Alex Wood kick (Drive: 1 play, 72 yards, 0:11; Arizona 14–10)
- (8:12) ARIZ – Casey Skowron 37-yard field goal (Drive: 5 plays, 38 yards, 0:57; Arizona 17–10)
- (2:56) USC – Ronald Jones 5-yard pass from Cody Kessler, Alex Wood kick (Drive: 13 plays, 82 yards, 5:11; Tied 17–17)

Third quarter

- (10:51) ARIZ – Casey Skowron 38-yard field goal (Drive: 6 plays, 9 yards, 2:42; Arizona 20–17)

Fourth quarter

- (14:55) USC – Justin Davis 9-yard run, Alex Wood kick (Drive: 7 plays, 50 yards, 2:31; USC 24–20)
- (10:05) ARIZ – Casey Skowron 44-yard field goal (Drive: 7 plays, 54 yards, 2:21; USC 24–23)
- (9:24) USC – Ronald Jones 74-yard run, Alex Wood kick (Drive: 2 plays, 80 yards, 0:37; USC 31–23)
- (2:36) USC – Justin Davis 16-yard run, Alex Wood kick (Drive: 11 plays, 85 yards, 5:05; USC 38–23)
- (0:10) ARIZ – Cayleb Jones 4-yard pass from Anu Solomon, Casey Skowron kick (Drive: 12 plays, 65 yards, 2:26; USC 38–30)

Statistics	ARIZ	USC
First downs	24	23
Total yards	412	472
Rushing yards	32–60	40–229
Passing yards	352	243
Passing: Comp–Att–Int	31–47–1	22–36–0
Time of possession	28:22	31:38

Team	Category	Player	Statistics
Arizona	Passing	Anu Solomon	31/46, 352 yards, 3 TD, INT
Arizona	Rushing	Jared Baker	13 carries, 63 yards
Arizona	Receiving	Nate Phillips	6 receptions, 94 yards, TD
USC	Passing	Cody Kessler	22/36, 243 yards, 2 TD
USC	Rushing	Ronald Jones	19 carries, 177 yards, TD
USC	Receiving	JuJu Smith-Schuster	8 receptions, 138 yards, TD

=== vs No. 10 Utah ===
No. 10 Utah Utes (8–1) vs Arizona Wildcats (5–5) – Game summary

Quarter	1	2	3	4	OT	2OT	Total
#10 Utes	7	10	10	0	3	0	30
Wildcats	17	3	7	0	3	7	37

at Arizona Stadium • Tucson, AZ

- Date: November 14, 2015
- Game time: 8:00 p.m. MST
- Game weather: High Clouds, 62 °F (17 °C)
- Game attendance: 48,912
- Referee: Land Clark
- TV: FS1

Game information

First quarter

- (12:54) ARIZ – Casey Skowron 47-yard field goal (Drive: 6 plays, 50 yards, 2:06; Arizona 3–0)
- (9:10) ARIZ – Samajie Grant 7-yard pass from Anu Solomon, Casey Skowron kick (Drive: 7 plays, 68 yards, 1:54; Arizona 10–0)
- (2:42) UTAH – Devontae Booker 1-yard run, Andy Phillips kick (Drive: 13 plays, 75 yards, 6:28; Arizona 10–7)
- (1:16) ARIZ – Cayleb Jones 17-yard pass from Anu Solomon, Casey Skowron kick (Drive: 4 plays, 73 yards, 1:20; Arizona 17–7)

Second quarter

- (5:39) UTAH – Andy Phillips 34-yard field goal (Drive: 13 plays, 51 yards, 6:08; Arizona 17–10)
- (2:25) ARIZ – Casey Skowron 40-yard field goal (Drive: 9 plays, 52 yards, 3:14; Arizona 20–10)
- (0:45) UTAH – Kenneth Scott 2-yard pass from Travis Wilson, Andy Phillips kick (Drive: 4 plays, 75 yards, 1:40; Arizona 20–17)

Third quarter

- (14:10) UTAH – Harris Handley 59-yard pass from Travis Wilson, Andy Phillips kick (Drive: 2 plays, 62 yards, 0:43; Utah 24–20)
- (5:19) UTAH – Andy Phillips 38-yard field goal (Drive: 12 plays, 60 yards, 5:49; Utah 27–20)
- (4:01) ARIZ – Anu Solomon 6-yard run, Casey Skowron kick (Drive: 3 plays, 72 yards, 1:10; Tied 27–27)

Fourth quarter

No scoring plays

First overtime

- UTAH – Andy Phillips 40-yard field goal (Drive: 4 plays, 3 yards; Utah 30–27)
- ARIZ – Casey Skowron 35-yard field goal (Drive: 4 plays, 7 yards; Tied 30–30)

Second overtime

- ARIZ – Nate Phillips 25-yard pass from Jerrard Randall, Casey Skowron kick (Drive: 1 play, 25 yards; Arizona 37–30)

Statistics	UTAH	ARIZ
First downs	24	24
Total yards	442	460
Rushing yards	55–223	34–158
Passing yards	219	302
Passing: Comp–Att–Int	20–31–1	18–32–2
Time of possession	37:24	22:36

Team	Category	Player	Statistics
Utah	Passing	Travis Wilson	20/31, 219 yards, 2 TD, INT
Utah	Rushing	Devontae Booker	34 carries, 145 yards, TD
Utah	Receiving	Harris Handley	2 receptions, 69 yards, TD
Arizona	Passing	Anu Solomon	17/27, 277 yards, 2 TD, INT
Arizona	Rushing	Anu Solomon	10 carries, 86 yards, TD
Arizona	Receiving	Cayleb Jones	5 receptions, 126 yards, TD

=== at Arizona State ===
Arizona Wildcats (6–5) at Arizona State Sun Devils (5–5) – Game summary

Quarter	1	2	3	4	Total
Wildcats	0	10	13	14	37
Sun Devils	14	17	0	21	52

at Sun Devil Stadium • Tempe, AZ

- Date: November 21, 2015
- Game time: 1:30 p.m. MST
- Game weather: Clear skies, 80 °F (27 °C)
- Game attendance: 64,885
- Referee: Michael Mothershed
- TV: FS1

Game information

First quarter

- (3:01) ASU – Demario Richard 8-yard run, Zane Gonzalez kick (Drive: 3 plays, 66 yards, 0:55; Arizona State 7–0)
- (1:07) ASU – Devin Lucien 59-yard pass from Mike Bercovici, Zane Gonzalez kick (Drive: 3 plays, 78 yards, 0:57; Arizona State 14–0)

Second quarter

- (14:27) ARIZ – Cam Denson 21-yard interception return, Casey Skowron kick (Arizona State 14–7)
- (10:33) ASU – Mike Bercovici 1-yard run, Zane Gonzalez kick (Drive: 10 plays, 78 yards, 3:47; Arizona State 21–7)
- (5:47) ARIZ – Casey Skowron 22-yard field goal (Drive: 9 plays, 70 yards, 4:39; Arizona State 21–10)
- (4:00) ASU – Jalen Harvey 41-yard pass from Mike Bercovici, Zane Gonzalez kick (Drive: 5 plays, 70 yards, 1:38; Arizona State 28–10)
- (0:00) ASU – Zane Gonzalez 29-yard field goal (Drive: 6 plays, 67 yards, 2:22; Arizona State 31–10)

Third quarter

- (11:32) ARIZ – Casey Skowron 37-yard field goal (Drive: 7 plays, 21 yards, 2:11; Arizona State 31–13)
- (3:35) ARIZ – Casey Skowron 46-yard field goal (Drive: 9 plays, 63 yards, 3:17; Arizona State 31–16)
- (0:46) ARIZ – Trey Griffey 95-yard pass from Brandon Dawkins, Casey Skowron kick (Drive: 2 plays, 97 yards, 0:54; Arizona State 31–23)

Fourth quarter

- (10:14) ASU – D.J. Foster 1-yard run, Zane Gonzalez kick (Drive: 11 plays, 74 yards, 5:24 Arizona State 38–23)
- (6:50) ARIZ – Tyrell Johnson 17-yard pass from Brandon Dawkins, Casey Skowron kick (Drive: 9 plays, 75 yards, 3:24; Arizona State 38–30)
- (3:33) ASU – Kareem Orr 21-yard interception return, Zane Gonzalez kick (Arizona State 45–30)
- (2:30) ASU – Lloyd Carrinton 38-yard interception return, Zane Gonzalez kick (Arizona State 52–30)
- (0:32) ARIZ – Brandon Dawkins 24-yard run, Casey Skowron kick (Drive: 11 plays, 75 yards, 1:58; Arizona State 52–37)

Statistics	ARIZ	ASU
First downs	19	24
Total yards	449	566
Rushing yards	35–113	48–250
Passing yards	336	316
Passing: Comp–Att–Int	20–43–2	21–32–1
Time of possession	27:36	32:24

Team	Category	Player	Statistics
Arizona	Passing	Brandon Dawkins	16/30, 301 yards, 2 TD, 2 INT
Arizona	Rushing	Brandon Dawkins	21 carries, 78 yards, TD
Arizona	Receiving	Trey Griffey	2 receptions, 138 yards, TD
Arizona State	Passing	Mike Bercovici	21/32, 316 yards, 2 TD, INT
Arizona State	Rushing	Kalen Ballage	18 carries, 110 yards
Arizona State	Receiving	Devin Lucien	9 receptions, 191 yards, TD

=== vs New Mexico (New Mexico Bowl) ===
Arizona Wildcats (6–6) vs New Mexico Lobos (6–6) – Game summary
(2015 Gildan New Mexico Bowl)

Quarter	1	2	3	4	Total
Wildcats	7	21	14	3	45
Lobos	3	14	14	6	37

at University Stadium • Albuquerque, NM

- Date: December 19, 2015
- Game time: 12:00 p.m. MST
- Game weather: Cloudy, 38 °F (3 °C)
- Game attendance: 30,289
- Referee: Larry Smith
- TV: ESPN

Game information

First quarter

- (9:52) UNM – Zack Rogers 37-yard field goal (Drive: 5 plays, 17 yards, 2:45; New Mexico 3–0)
- (7:26) ARIZ – Cayleb Jones 78-yard pass from Anu Solomon, Casey Skowron kick (Drive: 2 plays, 80 yards, 0:31; Arizona 7–3)

Second quarter

- (14:51) ARIZ – Jared Baker 27-yard run, Casey Skowron kick (Drive: 3 plays, 77 yards, 0:47; Arizona 14–3)
- (8:50) UNM – Lamar Jordan 31-yard run, Zack Rogers kick (Drive: 6 plays, 67 yards, 3:04; Arizona 14–10)
- (3:27) ARIZ – Anu Solomon 14-yard run, Casey Skowron kick (Drive: 4 plays, 53 yards, 1:18; Arizona 21–10)
- (2:19) UNM – Delane Hart-Johnson 92-yard pass from Lamar Jordan, Zack Rogers kick (Drive: 3 plays, 90 yards, 1:03; Arizona 21–17)
- (0:30) ARIZ – David Richards 1-yard pass from Anu Solomon, Casey Skowron kick (Drive: 4 plays, 51 yards, 1:39; Arizona 28–17)

Third quarter

- (13:56) ARIZ – Jared Baker 32-yard run, Casey Skowron kick (Drive: 4 plays, 75 yards, 1:04; Arizona 35–17)
- (9:17) UNM – Lamar Jordan 11-yard run, Zack Rogers kick (Drive: 8 plays, 72 yards, 4:32; Arizona 35–24)
- (7:35) ARIZ – Jared Baker 4-yard run, Casey Skowron kick (Drive: 1 play, 4 yards, 0:05; Arizona 42–24)
- (2:02) UNM – Lamar Jordan 3-yard run, Zack Rogers kick (Drive: 10 plays, 50 yards, 5:33; Arizona 42–31)

Fourth quarter

- (13:52) UNM – Austin Apodaca 4-yard run, two-point run failed (Drive: 8 plays, 40 yards, 3:06; Arizona 42–37)
- (1:32) ARIZ – Casey Skowron 37-yard field goal (Drive: 13 plays, 42 yards, 5:10; Arizona 45–37)

Statistics	ARIZ	UNM
First downs	19	25
Total yards	503	522
Rushing yards	32–174	69–333
Passing yards	329	189
Passing: Comp–Att–Int	13–24–1	10–22–3
Time of possession	19:08	40:52

Team	Category	Player	Statistics
Arizona	Passing	Anu Solomon	13/24, 329 yards, 2 TD, INT
Arizona	Rushing	Jared Baker	12 carries, 107 yards, 3 TD
Arizona	Receiving	Cayleb Jones	4 receptions, 182 yards, TD
New Mexico	Passing	Lamar Jordan	3/9, 110 yards, TD, 2 INT
New Mexico	Rushing	Lamar Jordan	21 carries, 135 yards, 3 TD
New Mexico	Receiving	Delane Hart-Johnson	1 reception, 92 yards, TD

Quarterback Anu Solomon was named Offensive MVP.

Linebacker Scooby Wright III was named Defensive MVP.

=== Rankings ===
Ranking movements Legend: ██ Increase in ranking ██ Decrease in ranking — = Not ranked RV = Received votes
	Week															
Poll	Pre	1	2	3	4	5	6	7	8	9	10	11	12	13	14	Final
AP	22	22	20	16	RV	—	—	—	—	—	—	—	—	—	—	
Coaches	22	20	19	16	RV	RV	—	RV	—	—	—	—	—	—	—	
CFP	Not released									—	—	—	—	—	—	Not released

=== Statistics ===
==== Team ====
As of 09/04/2015.

Team Statistics
	Arizona	Opponents
Scoring & Efficiency
Points	254	183
Points per game	42.3	30.5
Points Off Turnovers	49	31
Time of Possession per game	27:11	32:49
First Downs	162	126
Rushing	83	57
Passing	62	59
Penalty	17	10
3rd–Down Conversions-Pct.	41/88-47%	44/98-45%
4th–Down Conversions-Pct.	5/13-38	3/6-50%
Red Zone Scoring- Pct. chances	29-36-81%	24-25-96%
Red Zone Touchdowns - Pct.	24-36-67%	19-25-76%
PAT / Field goal attempts-Pct.	32–34-94%	21-22-95%
Penalties – Yards	34–307	42–429
Average per penalties game	51.2	71.5
Offense
Total Offense	3,181	2,515
Total Plays	475	450
Average per game	6.7	5.6
Rushing Yards	1,791	1,114
Rushing Attempts	274	259
Rushing per gain	1,937	1,244
Average Per Rush	6.5	4.3
Rushing per game	298.5	185.7
Passing Yards	1,114	1,303
Comp–Att-INT	117-201-1	111–191–6
Average per pass	6.9	7.3
Average Per catch	11.9	12.6
Average Per game	530.2	419.2
Passing TDs	13	10
Defense
INT Returns: # – Yards/TD	6 – 29-1	1–13-0
Fumbles Recovered: # – Yards/TD	1–0-1	0–0-0
Fumbles: Number losts	8-4	7–1
QB Sacks: # – Yards	11-70	8–35
Safeties	0	0
Special Teams
Kickoffs: # – Yards	46/2,855	36/2,292
Kickoff Returns: # – Yards/TD	11-225-0	26-581-0
Average Yards Per Return	20.5	22.3
Average Yards Per Kick	62.7	63.7
Net Kick Average	39.2	40.8
Onside Kicks: # – Recovered	–	–
Touchbacks		
Punts: # – Yards	18/797	24-955
Punt Returns: # – Yards/TD	1–26-0	9–30-0
Average Yards Per Return	26.0	3.3
Average Yards Per Punt	45.6	41.6
Net Punt Average	42.3	40.8
Field Goals: # – Attempts	6-8	8–10
Longest Field Goal: Yards	46	0

Non-conference opponents

	1	2	3	4	Total
Arizona	35	49	41	38	163
All opponents	9	37	6	13	65

Pac-12 opponents

	1	2	3	4	OT	2OT	Total
Arizona	64	65	50	52	3	7	241
Pac-12 opponents	62	117	73	56	3	0	311

Score total by Quarters

	1	2	3	4	OT	2OT	Total
Arizona	99	114	91	90	3	7	404
All opponents	71	154	79	69	3	0	376

==== Offense ====
Passing Statistics
#	NAME	POS	RAT	C-A	YDS	CMP%	TD	INT
12	Anu Solomon	QB	143.7	192-306	2,338	62.7%	18	4
8	Jerrard Randall	QB	114.7	43-82	483	52.4%	5	3
13	Brandon Dawkins	QB	84.7	4-8	33	50.0%	0	0
1	Cayleb Jones	WR-QB	310.0	1-1	25	100.0%	0	0
	TOTALS		158.2	240-397	2,879	67.0%	23	7
	OPPONENTS		123.3	59-105	762	56.2	5	1

Rushing Statistics
#	NAME	POS	ATT	YDS	LONG	TD
28	Nick Wilson	RB	127	718	43	8
23	Jared Baker	RB	116	684	79	6
8	Jerrard Randall	QB-RB	74	680	73	5
12	Anu Solomon	QB-RB	61	186	31	2
21	Orlando Bradford	RB	36	147	32	3
13	Brandon Dawkins	QB-RB	11	101	43	1
7	Jonathan Haden	RB	7	44	14	0
34	Zach Green	RB	7	43	17	0
2	Tyrell Johnson	RB-WR	4	24	11	0
14	Zach Werlinger	QB-RB	2	28	17	1
10	Samajie Grant	WR-RB	1	21	21	0
	TOTALS		330	2,676	351	18
	OPPONENTS		135	509	2	33

Receiving Statistics
#	NAME	POS	REC	YDS	LONG	TD
1	Cayleb Jones	WR	46	665	50	4
30	Johnny Jackson	WR	43	532	70	5
6	Nate Phillips	WR	39	519	44	4
4	David Richards	WR	40	505	50	4
10	Samajie Grant	WR	30	286	19	2
23	Jared Baker	RB-WR	10	95	25	0
5	Trey Griffey	WR	7	82	25	0
28	Nick Wilson	RB-WR	4	52	22	0
17	Josh Kern	TE	7	43	11	1
16	Shun Brown	WR	4	24	14	0
7	Jonathan Haden	RB-WR	3	21	8	0
84	Tony Ellison	WR	1	13	13	0
84	Abraham Mendivil	WR	1	5	5	0
5	Jamardre Cobb	RB-WR	2	1	1	1
	TOTALS		237	2,843	357	21
	OPPONENTS		59	762	69	5

==== Defense ====
Defense Statistics
#	NAME	POS	SOLO	AST	TOT	TFL-YDS	SACKS	INT-YDS/TD	BU	PD	QBH	FR–YDS	FF	BLK	SAF
7	Jamar Allah	S				–	–	2–25-0			–	–	–	–	–
12	Demetrius Flannigan-Fowles	FS				–	–	1–0-0			–	–	–	–	–
28	Anthony Lopez	FS				–	–	1–23-1			–	–	–	–	–
3	Cam Denson	CB					–	2–21-1			–		–	–	–
42	Anthony Fotu	DL				–	–	1-0–0		–		–	–	–	-
19	DaVonte' Neal	CB				–	–	1–0-0		–		–	–	–	–
	TOTAL					–	–	8–69-2				– '		–	–

Key: POS: Position, SOLO: Solo Tackles, AST: Assisted Tackles, TOT: Total Tackles, TFL: Tackles-for-loss, SACK: Quarterback Sacks, INT: Interceptions, BU: Passes Broken Up, PD: Passes Defended, QBH: Quarterback Hits, FF: Forced Fumbles, FR: Fumbles Recovered, BLK: Kicks or Punts Blocked, SAF: Safeties

==== Special teams ====
Kicking statistics
#	NAME	POS	XPM	XPA	XP%	FGM	FGA	FG%	0–19	20–29	30–39	40–49	50+	LNG	PTS
41	Casey Skoworon	PK	49	51	82.4%	14	17	60.0%	0/0	4/5	4/4	6/8	0/0	48	
9	Josh Pollack	PK	1	1					0/0	0/0	0/0	0/0	0/0		
	TOTALS		50	52		14	17			4/5	4/4	6/8	0/0	48	

Kickoff Statistics
#	NAME	POS	KICKS	YDS	AVG	TB	OB
41	Casey Skoworon	PK					
9	Josh Pollack	PK					
36	Oliver Graybar	PK					
	TOTALS						

Punting statistics
#	NAME	POS	PUNTS	YDS	AVG	LONG	TB	FC	I–20	50+	BLK
39	Drew Riggleman	P	42	1,872	44.6	66					
12	Anu Solomon	QB	2	32	16.0	20					
	TOTALS		44	1,904		86					

Kick return statistics
#	NAME	POS	RTNS	YDS	AVG	TD	LNG
2	Tyrell Johnson	WR-KR	13	317	24.4		56
6	Nate Phillips	WR-KR	8	156	19.5		24
23	Shun Brown	WR-KR	4	82	20.5		24
10	Jared Baker	RB-KR	2	51	25.5		33
7	Jonathan Haden	RB-KR	1	19	19.0		19
6	Samajie Grant	WR-KR	1	14	13.0		13
	TOTALS		11	240			79

Punt return statistics
#	NAME	POS	RTNS	YDS	AVG	TD	LONG
6	Nate Phillips	WR	5	97	19.4	1	69
19	DaVonte' Neal	CB	1	26	26.0		26
	TOTALS		6	123	26.0	1	95

== Awards and honors ==
=== Preseason All-Americans ===
Arizona had nine players selected as Preseason All-Americans going into the season. Anu Solomon was largely recognized on the second team of those organizations which published preseason lists. Cayleb Jones and Scooby Wright III were recognized as unanimous Preseason All-Americans, with Jones being selected to the first team of every publication.

Drew Riggleman: Phil Steele Preseason First Team All-American; Scooby Wright: Bleacher Report's 2015 College Football Preseason All-American Team; USA Today Preseason First Team All-American; CBS Sports Preseason First Team All-American; ESPN Preseason First Team All-American; Phil Steele Preseason First Team All-American; SI Preseason First Team All-American; Athlon Preseason First Team All-American; USA Today Preseason Team All-American; CFN Preseason First Team All-American; Scout.com Preseason First Team All-American; Lindys Preseason First Team All-American; Preseason All-Pac-12; Will Parks: Athlon Preseason First Team All-American; Phil Steele Preseason First Team All-American; Davonte' Neal: Athlon Preseason First Team All-American; Phil Steele Preseason First Team All-American	Reggie Gilbert: Athlon Preseason First Team All-American; Phil Steele Preseason First Team; Freddie Tagaloa: Athlon Preseason First Team All-American; Nick Wilson: Athlon Preseason First Team All-American; Phil Steele Preseason First Team All-American; Cayleb Jones: Athlon Preseason First Team All-American; Phil Steele Preseason First Team All-American; Preseason All-Pac-12; Anu Solomon: CBS Sports Preseason First Team All-American; ESPN Preseason First Team All-American; Phil Steele Preseason First Team All-American; SI Preseason First Team All-American; Athlon Preseason First Team All-American; USA Today Preseason Team All-American; CFN Preseason First Team All-American

=== Award watch lists ===
Anu Solomon: Walter Camp Player of the Year Watch List; Manning Award Watch List; Maxwell Award Watch List; Davey O'Brien Award Watch List; Polynesian College Football Player of the Year Watch List; Nick Wilson: Maxwell Award Watch List; Doak Walker Award Candidate; Cayleb Jones: Biletnikoff Award Watch List; Earl Campbell Tyler Rose Award Watch List; Freddie Tagaloa: Outland Trophy Watch List; Will Parks: Chuck Bednarik Award Watch List	Scooby Wright: Lott Trophy Award List; Butkus Award Watch List; Chuck Bednarik Award Watch List; Rotary Lombardi Award Watch List; Walter Camp Player of the Year Watch List; Casey Skoworon: AFCA Good Works Team Nominee; Wuerffel Trophy Watch List; Drew Riggleman: Ray Guy Award Watch List; Rich Rodriguez: Dodd Trophy Award Watch List

=== Award semifinalists ===
Players

- Casey Skowron - Campbell Trophy

=== Player of the Week honors ===
Week 1

- Cayman bundage – Offensive Player of the Week
- DaVonte’ Neal – Special Teams Player of the Week
- Branden leon – Scout Offensive Player of the Week
- Kevin Hamlett Jr./Malcolm Holland – Co-Scout Defensive Player of the Week
- De’Andre Miller – Hard Edge Player of the Week
- Reggie gilbert – Student Player of the Week

Week 2

- Nick wilson – Offensive Player of the Week
- Reggie gilbert – Defensive Player of the Week
- Will parks/jamar Allah – Co-Special Teams Player of the Week
- Zach werlinger – Scout Offensive Player of the Week
- Isaiah strong/carrington vaughn – Co-Scout Defensive Player of the Week
- Cayman bundage – Hard Edge Player of the Week
- Shun brown – Student of the Week
- Anthony Lopez– Community Service Award

Week 3

- Anu Solomon - Offensive Player of the Week
- Sani Fuimaono - Defensive Player the Week
- Casey Skowron - Special Teams Player of the Week
- Cedric Peterson - Scout Offensive Player of the Week
- John Kenny - Scout Defensive Player of the Week
- Albert Green - Scout Special Teams Player of the Week
- Jerrard Randall - Hard Edge Player of the Week
- RJ Morgan - Student of the Week
- Jake Matthews - Community Service Award

Week 6

- Layth Freikh - Offensive Player of the Week
- Will Parks - Defensive Player the Week
- Drew Riggleman - Special Teams Player of the Week
- Nathan Eldridge - Scout Offensive Player of the Week
- Malik Moody - Scout Defensive Player of the Week
- Nick Fadelli - Scout Special Teams Player of the Week
- Jamardre Cobb - Hard Edge Player of the Week
- Shariff Williams - Student of the Week
- David Catalano - Community Service Award

Week 7

- Jared Baker - Offensive Player of the Week
- Reggie Gilbert (2x) - Defensive Player the Week
- Cody Creason - Scout Offensive Player of the Week
- Samir Hinn - Scout Defensive Player of the Week
- Anthony Mariscal - Scout Special Teams Player of the Week
- Nate Phillips/Jerrard Randall - Co-Hard Edge Player of the Week
- Jacob Alsadek - Student of the Week

Week 11

Week 12

* Week 13

N/A

* Week 14

N/A

- Bye

=== All-Americans ===
Each year several publications release lists of their ideal "team". The athletes on these lists are referred to as All-Americans. The NCAA recognizes five All-American lists. They are the Associated Press (AP), American Football Coaches Association (AFCA), Football Writers Association of America (FWAA), Sporting News (SN), and the Walter Camp Football Foundation (WCFF). If a player is selected to the first team of three publications he is considered a consensus All-American, if a player is selected to the first team of all five publications he is considered a unanimous All-American.

Key:
First team
Consensus All-American
Unanimous All-American

==== Pac-12 All-Conference team ====
The Wildcats had TBA players honored as members of the 2015 Pac-12 All-Conference team, with TBA each on the first and second teams, respectively. TBA other Wildcats earned honorable mention honors.

- First team
- Second team
- Honorable mention

=== All-Academic teams ===
==== Pac-12 Conference All-Academic players ====
The Wildcats had TBA players selected to the Pac-12 Conference All-Academic Second Team, TBA players granted honorable mention and no players selected to the First Team. In order to be eligible for the academic team a player must maintain a minimum 3.0 overall grade-point average and play in at least 50 percent of their team's games.

- First team
- Second team
- Honorable mention

== Postseason ==
=== NFL draft ===
The following members of 2015 Arizona Wildcats football team were selected in the 2016 NFL draft.

Player	Position	Round	Pick	Team
Scooby Wright	LB			
Cayleb Jones	WR			

==== NFL Scouting Combine ====
TBA members of the 2015 team were invited to participate in drills at the 2016 NFL Scouting Combine.

2016 NFL combine participants
#	Name	POS	HT	WT	Arms	Hands	40	Bench press	Vert jump	Broad jump	3-cone drill	20-yd shuttle	60-yd shuttle	Ref

† Top performer

== Media affiliates ==
=== Radio ===
- ESPN Radio – (ESPN Tucson 1490 AM & 104.09 FM) – Nationwide (Dish Network, Sirius XM, TuneIn radio and iHeartRadio)
- KCUB 1290 AM – Football Radio Show – (Tucson, AZ)
- KHYT – 107.5 FM (Tucson, AZ)
- KTKT 990 AM – La Hora de Los Gatos (Spanish) – (Tucson, AZ)
- KGME 910 AM – (IMG Sports Network) – (Phoenix, AZ)
- KTAN 1420 AM – (Sierra Vista, AZ)
- KDAP 96.5 FM (Douglas, Arizona)
- KWRQ 102.3 FM – (Safford, AZ/Thatcher, AZ)
- KIKO 1340 AM – (Globe, AZ)
- KVWM 970 AM – (Show Low, AZ/Pinetop-Lakeside, AZ)
- XENY 760 – (Nogales, Sonora) (Spanish)

=== TV ===
- KOLD (CBS)
- KGUN (ESPN College Football on ABC/ABC)
- FOX (Fox Sports Media Group)
- FS1 (Fox Sports Media Group)
- ESPN (ESPN Family)
- ESPN2 (ESPN Family)
- ESPNU (ESPN Family)
- CBS Sports Network
- Pac-12 Network (Pac-12 Arizona)
