= 2015 New Mexico Bowl =

American college football game

2015 Gildan New Mexico Bowl
Arizona Wildcats	New Mexico Lobos
(6–6)	(7–5)
Pac-12	Mountain West
45	37
Head coach: Rich Rodriguez	Head coach: Bob Davie
	1	2	3	4	Total
Arizona	7	21	14	3	45
New Mexico	3	14	14	6	37
- Date: December 19, 2015
- Season: 2015
- Stadium: University Stadium
- Location: Albuquerque, New Mexico
- MVP: Offense: Arizona QB Anu Solomon; Defense:Arizona LB Scooby Wright III
- Favorite: Arizona by 8
- Referee: Larry Smith (MAC)
- Attendance: 30,289
- Payout: US$456,250

United States TV coverage
- Network: ESPN/ESPN Radio
- Announcers: Eamon McAnaney, Rocky Boiman, & Laura Rutledge (ESPN); Drew Goodman Tom Ramsey, & Marty Cesario (ESPN Radio)

The 2015 New Mexico Bowl was a college football bowl game that was played on December 19, 2015 at University Stadium in Albuquerque, New Mexico. The tenth annual New Mexico Bowl, it pitted the University of New Mexico Lobos of the Mountain West Conference against the University of Arizona Wildcats of the Pac-12 Conference. It was one of the 2015–16 bowl games that concluded the 2015 FBS football season. The game started at 12:20 p.m. MST and aired on ESPN. Sponsored by clothing company Gildan Activewear, the game was officially known as the Gildan New Mexico Bowl.

== Team selection ==
The game featured the New Mexico Lobos against the Arizona Wildcats. It was the 67th overall meeting between these teams, with Arizona leading the series 43–20–3 before this game (both had previously been in-conference rivals in the Border Conference and the Western Athletic Conference before Arizona joined the Pacific-10 Conference (now the Pac-12 Conference) and New Mexico joined the Mountain West. The last meeting between these two teams was in 2008, when the Lobos beat the Wildcats 36–28 in Albuquerque.

=== Arizona Wildcats ===
Arizona head coach Rich Rodriguez had led the Wildcats to bowl appearances in each of his four seasons with the school. Overall, Rodriguez entered with a 4–5 bowl record as the head coach at Arizona (2–1), Michigan (0–1) and West Virginia (2–3).

=== New Mexico Lobos ===
This was the first bowl appearance for the Lobos under fourth-year head coach Bob Davie, who had three previous bowl appearances as the head coach at Notre Dame. UNM entered 3–7–1 all time in bowl games, with their last appearance being a win in the 2007 New Mexico Bowl. The Lobos play their home games at the New Mexico Bowl site – University Stadium – and had a 5–2 record in 2015 at home.

== Game summary ==
=== Scoring summary ===
Scoring summary

Quarter	Time	Drive			Team	Scoring information	Score	
Quarter	Time	Plays	Yards	TOP	Team	Scoring information	ARIZ	UNM
1	9:52	5	17	2:45	UNM	37-yard field goal by Zack Rogers	0	3
1	7:26	2	80	0:31	ARIZ	Cayleb Jones 78-yard touchdown reception from Anu Solomon, Casey Skowron kick good	7	3
2	14:51	3	77	0:47	ARIZ	Jared Baker 27-yard touchdown run, Casey Skowron kick good	14	3
2	8:50	6	67	3:04	UNM	Lamar Jordan 31-yard touchdown run, Zack Rogers kick good	14	10
2	3:27	4	53	1:18	ARIZ	Anu Solomon 14-yard touchdown run, Casey Skowron kick good	21	10
2	2:19	3	90	1:08	UNM	Delane Hart-Johnson 92-yard touchdown reception from Lamar Jordan, Zack Rogers kick good	21	17
2	0:30	4	51	1:49	ARIZ	David Richards 1-yard touchdown reception from Anu Solomon, Casey Skowron kick good	28	17
3	13:56	4	75	1:04	ARIZ	Jared Baker 32-yard touchdown run, Casey Skowron kick good	35	17
3	9:17	8	72	4:39	UNM	Lamar Jordan 11-yard touchdown run, Zack Rogers kick good	35	24
3	7:35	1	4	0:05	ARIZ	Jared Baker 4-yard touchdown run, Casey Skowron kick good	42	24
3	2:02	10	50	5:33	UNM	Lamar Jordan 3-yard touchdown run, Zack Rogers kick good	42	31
4	13:52	8	40	3:10	UNM	Austin Apodaca 4-yard touchdown run, 2-point run failed	42	37
4	1:32	13	42	5:10	ARIZ	37-yard field goal by Casey Skowron	45	37
"TOP" = time of possession. For other American football terms, see Glossary of American football.							45	37

=== Statistics ===
Statistics	ARIZ	UNM
First downs	19	25
Plays–yards	56–503	91–522
Rushes–yards	32–174	69–333
Passing yards	329	189
Passing: Comp–Att–Int	13–24–1	10–22–3
Time of possession	19:08	40:52

Team	Category	Player	Statistics
ARIZ	Passing	Anu Solomon	13/24, 329 yds, 2 TD, 1 INT
ARIZ	Rushing	Jared Baker	12 car, 107 yds, 3 TD
ARIZ	Receiving	Cayleb Jones	4 rec, 182 yds, 1 TD
UNM	Passing	Lamar Jordan	3/9, 110 yds, 1 TD, 2 INT
UNM	Rushing	Lamar Jordan	21 car, 135 yds, 3 TD
UNM	Receiving	Delane Hart-Johnson	1 rec, 92 yds, 1 TD

== See also ==
- Arizona–New Mexico football rivalry
