= Nick Wilson (American football) =

American football player (born 1996)

Personal information
- Born: April 21, 1996 (age 30); Fresno, California, U.S.
- Listed height: 6 ft 0 in (1.83 m)
- Listed weight: 191 lb (87 kg)

Career information
- High school: Fresno (CA) Central
- College: Arizona
- NFL draft: 2018: undrafted

Nick Wilson (born April 21, 1996) is an American football running back.

== Early life ==
Wilson attended Central High School in Fresno, California. As a senior, he was the Tri-River Athletic Conference Offensive Player of the Year after rushing for 1,119 yards on 126 carries. As a junior in 2012 he rushed for a school record 1,627 yards. Wilson was a four-star recruit by Rivals.com. In March 2013, he committed to the University of Arizona to play college football.

College recruiting
Name	Hometown	School	Height	Weight	40^{‡}	Commit date
Nick Wilson; RB	Fresno, CA	Central High School (Fresno, California)	6 ft 0 in (1.83 m)	191 lb (87 kg)	4.40	Mar 12, 2013
Nick Wilson; RB	Recruit ratings: Scout: Rivals: 247Sports: (82)					
Overall recruit ranking: Scout: 29 (RB) Rivals: 23 (RB) ESPN: 21 (RB)
‡ Refers to 40-yard dash; Note: In many cases, Scout, Rivals, 247Sports, On3, and ESPN may conflict in their listings of height, weight and 40 time.; In these cases, the average was taken. ESPN grades are on a 100-point scale.; Sources: "2013 Team Ranking". Rivals.com.

== College career ==
In Wilson's first career college game he rushed for 104 yards on seven carries with a touchdown. Against Utah, Wilson rushed for 218 yards with three touchdowns on 20 carries.

=== College statistics ===
Year	Team	W-L	Games	Att	Yards	Avg	Long	Rush TDs	Rec	Yards	Avg	Long	Rec TDs
2014	Arizona	10–4 (.714)	13	236	1,375	5.8	85	16	12	90	7.5	34	1
2015	Arizona	4–2 (.667)	6	134	729	5.4	43	8	4	52	13.0	22	0
2016	Arizona	2–3 (.400)	5	55	320	5.8	49	3	2	11	13.0	8	0
2017	Arizona	4–1 (1.000)	5	67	348	5.2	46	3	1	6	6.0	6	0
Career		20–10 (.667)	29	491	2,779	5.7	99	30	19	159	8.4	50	1

100+ Yard Games (12 Total)
Date	Opponent	Yards	TD
September 4, 2014	UTSA	174	1
September 13, 2014	Nevada	171	2
November 8, 2014	Colorado	153	0
November 15, 2014	Washington	104	2
November 22, 2014	at Utah	218	3
November 28, 2014	Arizona State	178	3
September 12, 2015	Nevada	194	3
September 19, 2015	Northern Arizona	143	2
September 26, 2015	UCLA	136	0
September 3, 2016	BYU	138	2
September 10, 2016	Grambling State	116	1
October 14, 2017	UCLA	135	2

== Professional career ==
After going undrafted in 2018, Wilson was invited to rookie minicamp on a tryout basis with the Chicago Bears in May 2018.

== Awards and honors ==
2016

- Doak Walker Award Preseason Watchlist

†Shared award
