= Anu Solomon =

American football player (born 1994)

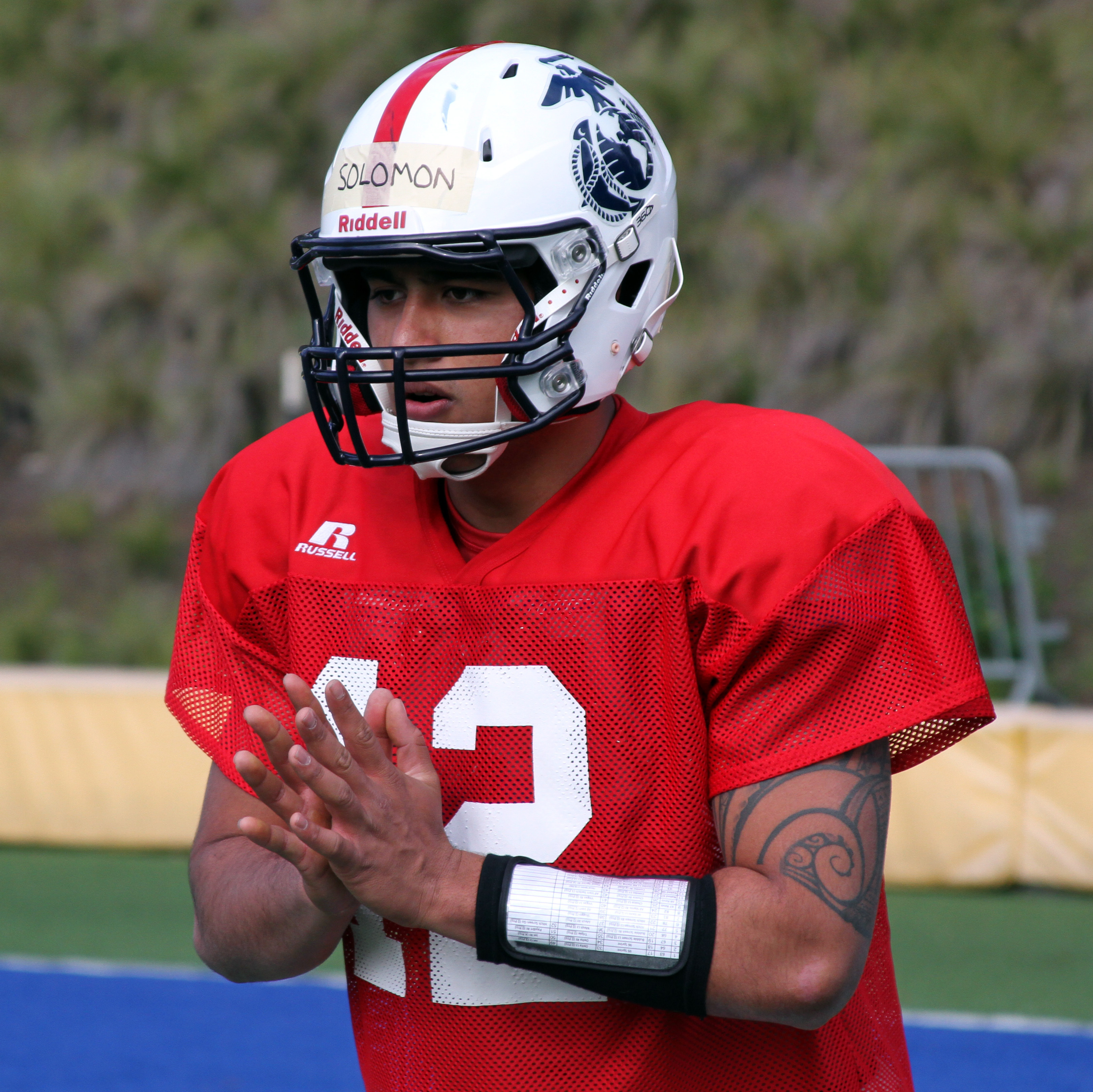
- Solomon practicing before the 2013 Semper Fidelis All-American Bowl

No. 12
- Position: Quarterback

Personal information
- Born: November 5, 1994 (age 32); Kalihi, Hawaii, U.S.
- Listed height: 6 ft 2 in (1.88 m)
- Listed weight: 205 lb (93 kg)

Career information
- High school: Bishop Gorman (Las Vegas, Nevada)
- College: Arizona (2013–2016); Baylor (2017)
- Stats at ESPN

Jarrett Pekelo Kahanuolaokalani "Anu" Solomon Jr. (born November 5, 1994) is an American former college football player who was a quarterbackfor the Arizona Wildcats and Baylor Bears. He began his career at Arizona, before deciding to transfer after his senior year to Baylor. He decided to withdraw from Baylor on October 31, 2017, after suffering a concussion.

== Early life ==
Solomon is Hawaiian. He was born in Honolulu, Hawaii, and he moved to Las Vegas, Nevada at age 10. He grew up with an interest in sports. His father, Jarrett Sr., was an all star, all-state linebacker at Farrington High School and attended San Jose State University. As a youngster, Anu played a variety of sports—baseball (pitcher), basketball (point guard) and football (linebacker and quarterback).

Solomon graduated from Bishop Gorman High School in Las Vegas, Nevada, in 2013. In four seasons, he passed for 5,234 yards and 49 touchdowns, and rushed for another 1,263 yards and 19 more scores in leading the four-time champion Bishop Gorman Gaels to an overall record of 43–3.

As a freshman, Bishop Gorman won its first 12 games. Solomon passed for 2,026 yards with 19 touchdowns, and had 78 yards rushing with 3 touchdowns. He led Bishop Gorman to a 12–1 record.

In his sophomore year, Solomon passed for 2,419 yards and 42 touchdowns, and also rushed for 276 yards and two scores. Bishop Gorman finished with a 13–2 record.

Solomon passed for 2,770 yards and 41 touchdowns in his junior year of high school. He also rushed for 389 yards and six scores. Bishop Gorman finished with a 15–1 record.

Solomon, in his senior year, became the most accomplished passer in Nevada history. Quarterbacking the Bishop Gorman Gaels since his freshman season, he helped in winning the school a record four state titles. In his final high school season, Solomon passed for 2,271 yards and threw 30 touchdowns, while rushing for 179 yards and eight scores. He led Bishop Gorman to a 12–1 record and won a record fourth state title. With 56 wins as a starter, Solomon is the winningest quarterback in high school football history.

Coming out of high school, Solomon received scholarship offers from Football Bowl Subdivision schools Arizona, Arizona State, Brigham Young University, Colorado, Illinois, Purdue, Utah, Oregon State, Hawaii, Washington, Washington State, Wisconsin and the University of Nevada at Las Vegas. Solomon made a verbal commitment to Arizona on National Signing Day and signed with Arizona in May 2012. He was ranked by Rivals.com as a four-star recruit and the second best dual-threat quarterback in his class.

College recruiting
Name	Hometown	School	Height	Weight	Commit date
Anu Solomon; QB	Las Vegas, NV	Bishop Gorman High School	6 ft 1 in (1.85 m)	202 lb (92 kg)	May 20, 2012
Anu Solomon; QB	Recruit ratings: Scout: Rivals: (76)				
Overall recruit ranking: Scout: 27 Rivals: 37 ESPN: 39
Note: In many cases, Scout, Rivals, 247Sports, On3, and ESPN may conflict in their listings of height and weight.; In these cases, the average was taken. ESPN grades are on a 100-point scale.; Sources: "Scout.com Football Recruiting: Arizona". Scout.; "2013 Player Signees- Arizona". ESPN.; "Scout.com Team Recruiting Rankings". Scout.; "2013 Team Ranking". Rivals.com.

== College career ==
=== Arizona ===
Solomon accepted an athletic scholarship to attend University of Arizona, where he played for coach Rich Rodriguez's Arizona Wildcats team from 2013 to 2016. Solomon was redshirted during the 2013 season and did not play in any games behind senior quarterback B.J. Denker. He made the travel squad after enrolling with the college in January.

Prior to the 2014 season, Solomon was named Arizona's starting quarterback. In his college debut, he completed 25 of 44 passes for 425 yards and 4 touchdowns against UNLV in a 58–13 victory. Solomon was launched into the national scene after he led Arizona to a 31–24 victory over #2 Oregon in Eugene, OR. Solomon helped lead the team to a 10–2 regular season record to win Pac-12 South division championship for the first time in school history, in a 42–35 win over Pac-12 South rival Arizona State. In a rematch against Oregon, Arizona suffered a 59–13 loss in the Pac-12 Football Championship Game. After a 10–3 regular season, the Wildcats were selected to play in the Fiesta Bowl, a New Year Six game in the CFB Playoff, against Boise State. Boise State would win the game 38–30. Solomon finished the season with 3,793 passing yards, 28 touchdown passes and 9 interceptions.

In 2015, Solomon entered his redshirt sophomore year as the starting quarterback for the Wildcats. He was named to several preseason watch lists, including the Manning Award, the Maxwell Award, the Davey O’Brien Award and the Walter Camp Player of the Year watch list. Arizona started the 2015 season ranked No. 22 by the Associated Press and Coaches Poll. In the season opener, Solomon completed 22 of 36 passes for 229 yards and four touchdowns as Arizona defeated UTSA 34–16. He finished the season with 6,460 career passing yards, which is fourth-most in school history, and 48 passing touchdowns, which is third-most all-time. He started and played 11 games, missing contests at Stanford (10/3) and ASU (11/21) due to injury. He also missed the second half against UCLA (9/26) and much of fourth quarter against Utah (11/14). Missed time did not prevent him from improving his completion percentage (62.1 percent) and efficiency (146.98) numbers from a breakout freshman season. His average of 242.5 yards per game was boosted late in season over final three starts, where he averaged 319 yards per game and completed 67 percent of passes in those contests against USC (11/7), Utah (11/14) and New Mexico (12/19). He had set a school record for most attempts to begin a season without an interception (210) and saw another program record of 233 overall attempts without a pick come to an end at Washington (10/31) He had a season high for passing yards came at USC (352), while twice tossing four touchdown passes (UTSA, 9/3; Nevada, 9/12). He rushed for scores against NAU (9/19), Utah (11/14) and New Mexico in the Gildan New Mexico Bowl (12/19) and netted 86 yards on 12 rushes with a score in an upset of No. 10 Utah. Solomon tossed multiple touchdown passes in six games, suffering his first career defeat (at USC) in 13 games when throwing at least two touchdowns.

In 2016, Solomon finished the season with 6,922 career passing yards, which is fourth-most in school history, and 49 passing touchdowns, which is third-most all-time. Starting and playing 4 games, he missed seven contests including Grambling State, Hawaii, Washington, at UCLA, at Utah, USC, and ASU due to injury.

He finished his career 17–13 (.567) as a starter at Arizona and completed 562 of 851 passes for 7,964 yards, 49 touchdown pass and 28 interceptions. On December 13, 2016, it was announced that Solomon intended to transfer from Arizona, graduating early to be eligible to play in 2017.

=== Baylor ===
On January 9, 2017, Solomon committed to Baylor University for the 2017 season as a graduate transfer.

Solomon struggled in two games for Baylor. He suffered a concussion during the Bears 17–10 loss to UTSA on September 9, 2017.

On October 31, 2017, head coach Matt Rhule announced that Solomon would be withdrawing from Baylor due to his concussion.

=== Statistics ===
Year	Team	Games			Passing								Rushing			
Year	Team	GP	GS	Record	Cmp	Att	Pct	Yds	Avg	TD	INT	Rtg	Att	Yds	Avg	TD
2013	Arizona	Redshirt														
2014	Arizona	14	14	10–4	313	540	58.0	3,793	7.0	28	9	130.7	137	291	2.1	2
2015	Arizona	11	11	7–4	205	330	62.1	2,667	8.1	20	5	147.0	67	198	3.0	3
2016	Arizona	5	2	0–2	37	63	58.7	462	7.3	1	2	119.2	25	−52	−2.1	0
2017	Baylor	2	2	0–2	24	55	43.6	399	7.3	4	2	121.3	16	106	6.6	0
Career		32	29	17–12	579	988	58.6	7,321	7.4	53	18	134.9	245	543	2.2	5

== Awards and honors ==
High school awards & honors

- Prep Top-150 Dream Team
- Lemming Top Player (Combo Passer) selection
- Three-time all-conference (Division I/I Sunset)
- Three-time all-region
- Four-time all-state selection (NV)
- Three-time MaxPreps All-American
- Four-Time State Champion

2014

- All-Pac-12 Honorable Mention
- 2× Coaches Offensive Player of the Week
- 3× Manning Award of the Week
- Athlon Sports' National Freshman of the Week
- 2× Davey O'Brien Award QB of the Week
- Athlon Sports' Pac12 Player of the Week
- Vegas Seven- Las Vegas Bowl Pac-12 Player of the Week, Sep 24

2015

- 2015 New Mexico Bowl Offensive MVP

== Personal life ==
Anu is the son of Jarrett Sr. and Jamielyn Solomon and he has six siblings. His given name is Jarrett Pekelo Kahanuolaokalani Jr. He has shortened his middle name to Anu because his young cousins could not pronounce Kahanu. At college, he majored in Economy and Sport industry.
