= Scooby Wright =

American football player (born 1994)

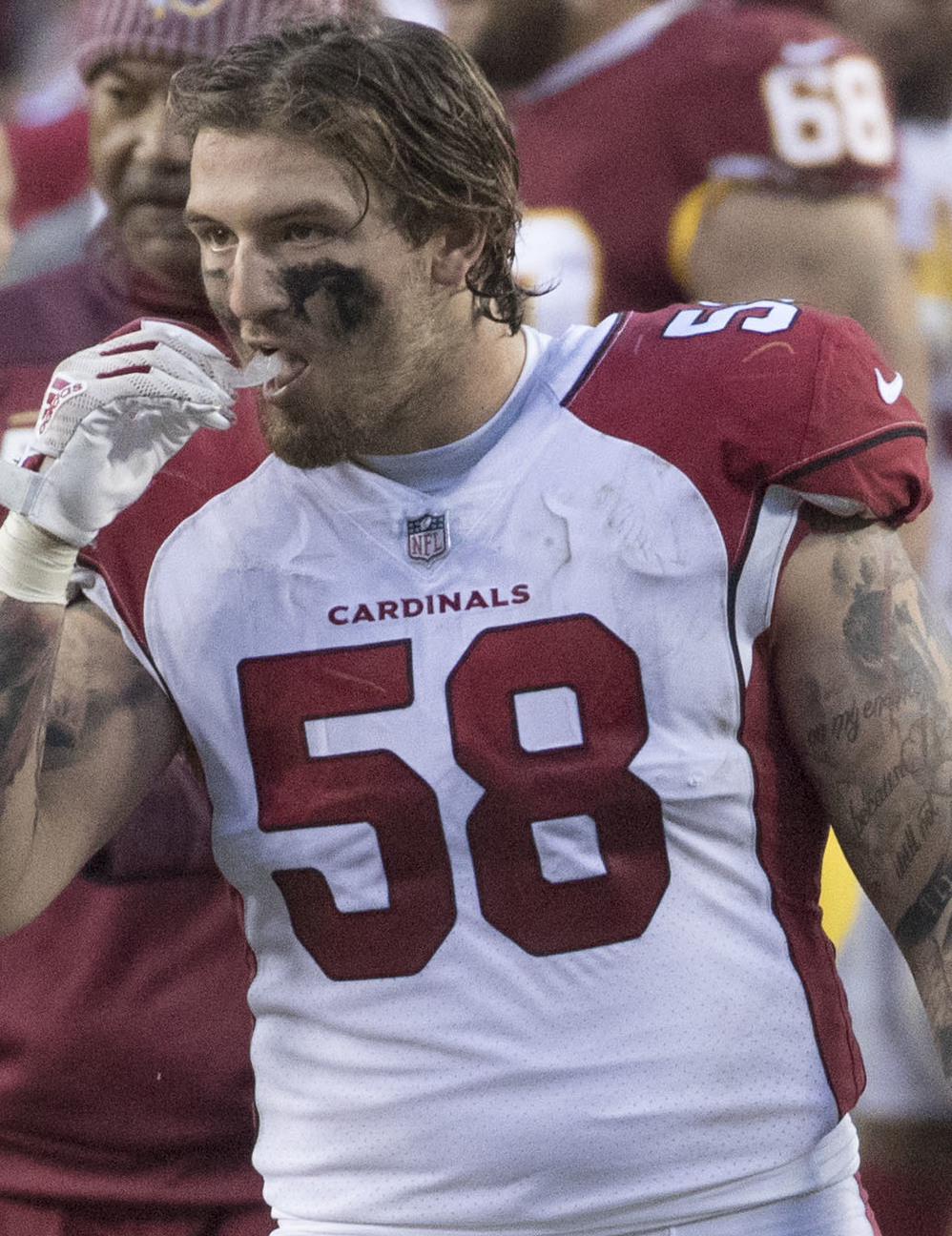
- Wright with the Arizona Cardinals in 2017

No. 58, 96, 33
- Position: Linebacker

Personal information
- Born: August 28, 1994 (age 32); Windsor, California, U.S.
- Listed height: 6 ft 0 in (1.83 m)
- Listed weight: 246 lb (112 kg)

Career information
- High school: Cardinal Newman (Santa Rosa, California)
- College: Arizona (2013–2015)
- NFL draft: 2016: 7th round, 250th overall pick

Career history
- Cleveland Browns (2016); Arizona Cardinals (2016–2017); Arizona Hotshots (2019); New England Patriots (2019)*; DC Defenders (2020); Birmingham Stallions (2022–2024)
- * Offseason or practice squad member only

Awards and highlights
- 2× USFL champion (2022, 2023); UFL champion (2024); Bronko Nagurski Trophy (2014); Lombardi Award (2014); Chuck Bednarik Award (2014); Jack Lambert Trophy (2014); Unanimous All-American (2014); Pac-12 Defensive Player of the Year (2014); First-team All-Pac-12 (2014)

Career NFL statistics
- Total tackles: 7
- Stats at Pro Football Reference

Philip Anthony "Scooby" Wright III (born August 28, 1994) is an American former professional football player who was a linebacker in the National Football League (NFL). He played college football for the Arizona Wildcats, winning several national awards, including the Chuck Bednarik Award in 2014.

== Early life ==
Wright attended Cardinal Newman High School in Santa Rosa, California, where he was a two-sport star in football and track. He was regarded as a two-star recruit by Rivals.com. Wright was a four-year varsity player at linebacker and running back for the Cardinals. Wright was an all-state selection his junior and senior years. Also a standout shot putter on the track team, Wright had a top-throw of 15.67 meters (51–3).

== College career ==
Despite being lightly recruited, Wright earned immediate playing time as a true freshman at the University of Arizona in 2013. He started 12 of 13 games, recording 83 tackles and an interception and garnering Honorable Mention All-Pac-12 Conference honors. Wright remained a starter as a sophomore in 2014. He was a finalist for numerous awards, including the Walter Camp Award. He claimed the Bronko Nagurski Trophy, Lombardi Award, Jack Lambert Award, Chuck Bednarik Award and also was named the Pac-12 Defensive Player of the Year, becoming the first sophomore to ever win the conference award. Wright also earned first-team All-Pac-12 honors. He had the highest finish of any defensive player in the 2014 Heisman Trophy voting, finishing ninth on the ballot. As a junior in 2015, Wright played only 3 games due to injury, recording 2 sacks and 23 tackles. After his junior year, he announced his intentions to enter the 2016 NFL draft.

== Professional career ==
Pre-draft measurables
Height	Weight	Arm length	Hand span	40-yard dash	10-yard split	20-yard split	20-yard shuttle	Three-cone drill	Vertical jump	Broad jump	Bench press
5 ft 11 3/4 in (1.82 m)	239 lb (108 kg)	30 1/2 in (0.77 m)	9 3/4 in (0.25 m)	4.90 s	1.67 s	2.82 s	4.47 s	7.25 s	35.0 in (0.89 m)	9 ft 5 in (2.87 m)	22 reps
All values from NFL Combine/Pro Day

=== Cleveland Browns ===
Wright was selected by the Cleveland Browns in the seventh round (250th overall) of the 2016 NFL draft. On May 14, 2016, Wright signed a four-year deal worth $2.401 million featuring a $60,700 signing bonus. He was waived by the Browns on September 20. The next day, Wright was re-signed to the team's practice squad.

=== Arizona Cardinals ===
On December 13, 2016, Wright was signed by the Arizona Cardinals off the Browns' practice squad.

On September 2, 2017, Wright was waived by the Cardinals and was signed to the practice squad the next day. He was promoted to the active roster on September 8. Wright was waived on September 11, and was re-signed to the practice squad. He was promoted back to the active roster on October 3.

On September 1, 2018, Wright was waived by the Cardinals.

=== Arizona Hotshots ===
On December 11, 2018, Wright signed with the Arizona Hotshots of the Alliance of American Football (AAF). Wright was credited with 9 tackles in the 8 games played prior to the league shutting down.

=== New England Patriots ===
After the AAF ceased operations in April 2019, Wright signed with the New England Patriots on August 25, 2019. He was released during final roster cuts on August 31. He was re-signed to the practice squad on September 20. On October 1, Wright was released from the practice squad.

=== DC Defenders ===
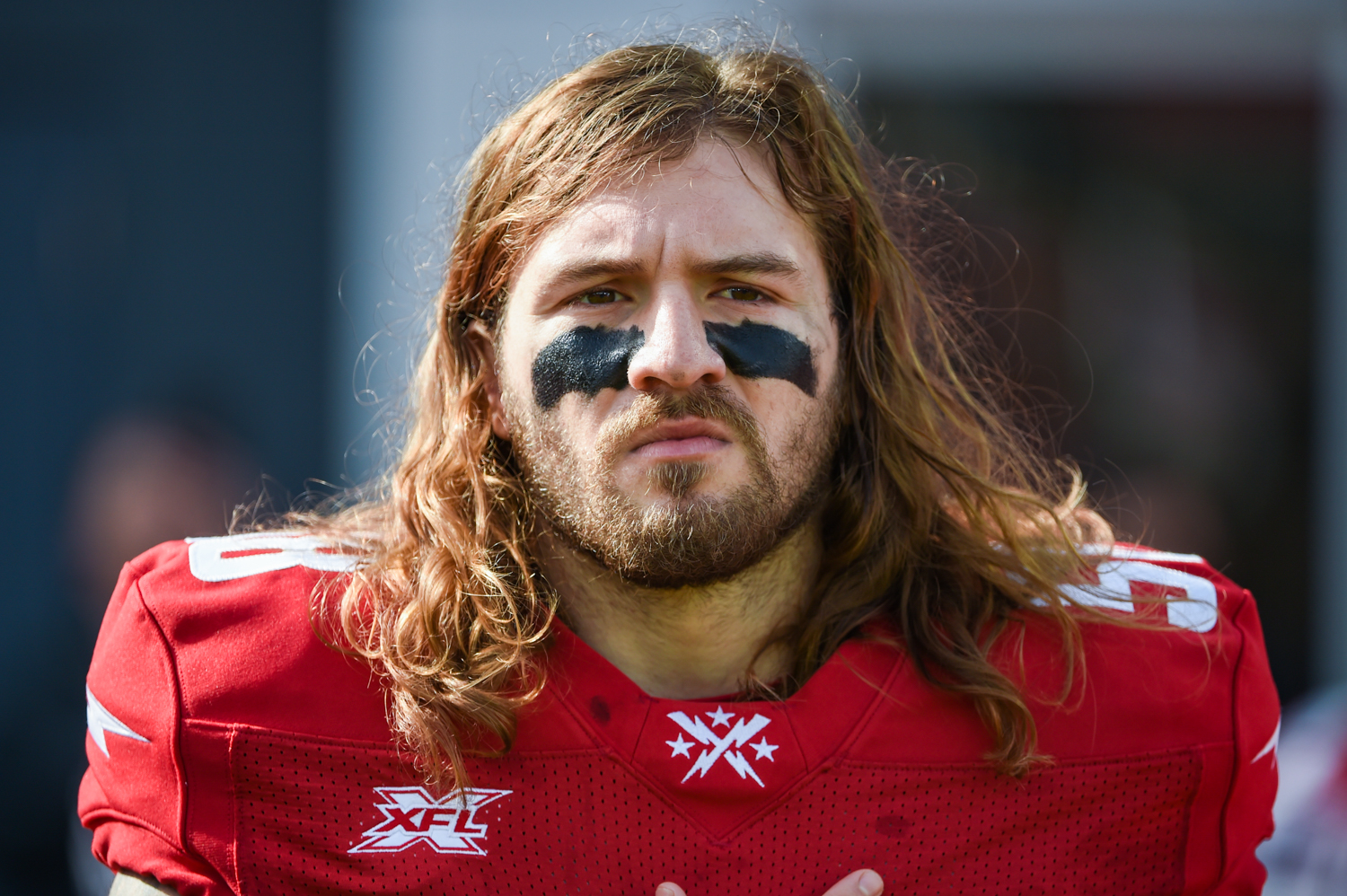
Wright with the Defenders in 2020

In October 2019, Wright was selected by the DC Defenders of the XFL in the 2020 XFL draft. In 4 games played, Wright put up 17 tackles. He had his contract terminated when the league suspended operations on April 10, 2020.

=== The Spring League ===
Wright signed with the Alphas of The Spring League on October 17, 2020.

=== Birmingham Stallions ===
On February 23, 2022, Wright was selected by the Birmingham Stallions of the United States Football League (USFL). Wright won Defensive Player of the Week in week 4 with six tackles, one sack, and two tackles for loss. He was ruled inactive for the game against the Philadelphia Stars on May 15, with a calf injury and an illness. He was transferred back to the active roster on May 20, but moved back to the inactive roster later that day. He scored a pick six in the fourth quarter of the 2022 USFL championship for the go ahead score.

Wright was placed on the injured reserve list by the team on May 11, 2023, and transferred to the team's inactive roster on June 12. He was placed on injured reserve on April 24, 2024. On May 21, Wright announced his retirement due to a neck injury, but remained on injured reserve until the end of the season.

== Career statistics ==
=== Professional ===
==== Regular season ====
Year	League	Team	Games	Tackles				Interceptions					Fumbles			
Year	League	Team	GP	Cmb	Solo	Ast	Sck	Int	Yds	Avg	Lng	TD	FF	FR	Yds	TD
2016	NFL	ARI	3	2	0	2	0.0	0	0	0.0	0	0	0	0	0	0
2017	NFL	ARI	10	5	5	0	0.0	0	0	0.0	0	0	0	0	0	0
2019	AAF	ARI	7	22	13	9	0.0	0	0	0.0	0	0	0	0	0	0
2020	XFL	DC	4	17	9	8	0.0	0	0	0.0	0	0	0	0	0	0
2022	USFL	BHM	7	52	24	28	3.0	0	0	0.0	0	0	2	0	0	0
NFL career			13	7	5	2	0.0	0	0	0.0	0	0	0	0	0	0
Spring career			18	91	46	45	3.0	0	0	0.0	0	0	2	0	0	0

==== Postseason ====
Year	League	Team	Games	Tackles				Interceptions					Fumbles			
Year	League	Team	GP	Cmb	Solo	Ast	Sck	Int	Yds	Avg	Lng	TD	FF	FR	Yds	TD
2022	USFL	BHM	2	10	2	8	0.0	1	46	46.0	46	1	0	0	0	0

=== College ===
Year	GP	TSolo	TAsst	TOT	TFL	TFLYDS	SCK	SCKYDS	INT	INTYDS	TD	FF	FR
2013	13	46	37	83	9.0	29	0	0	1	13	0	0	0
2014	14	99	64	163	29.0	96	14.0	71	0	0	0	6	1
2015	3	16	7	23	3.5	12	2.0	12	0	0	0	0	0
Total	27	145	101	236	38.0	125	14.0	71	1	13	0	6	1

== Personal life ==
Wright is the son of Philip Jr. and Annette Wright. His father is head softball coach at Santa Rosa Junior College and played football at Long Beach State. His sister, Ashley, played softball at Illinois. Wright has been called "Scooby" since he was a baby when his father nicknamed him.

== See also ==
- List of NCAA major college football yearly tackles leaders
