= Reggie Gilbert =

American football player (born 1993)

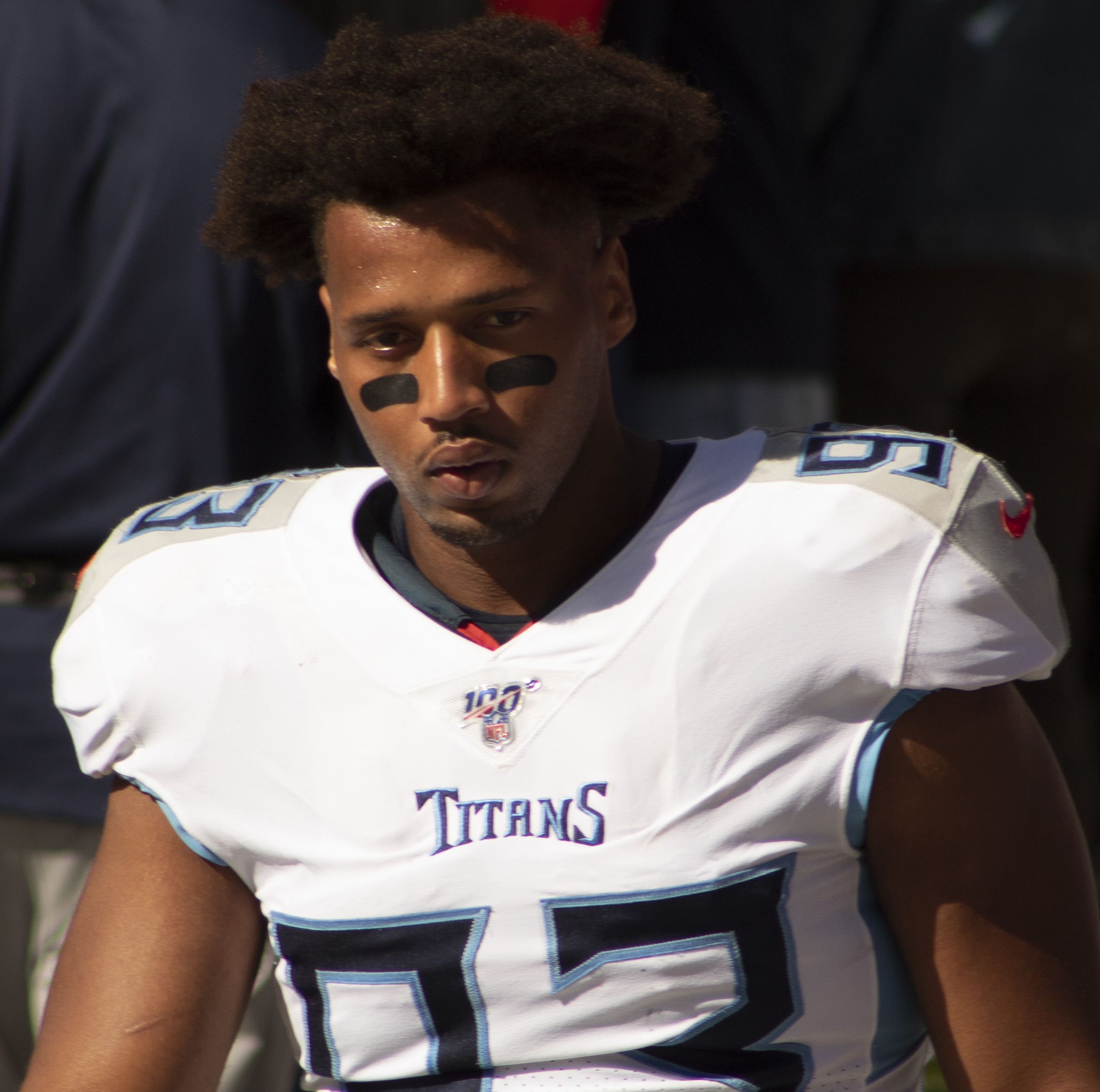
- Gilbert with the Tennessee Titans in 2019

No. 93
- Position: Linebacker

Personal information
- Born: April 1, 1993 (age 33); Laveen, Arizona, U.S.
- Listed height: 6 ft 3 in (1.91 m)
- Listed weight: 261 lb (118 kg)

Career information
- High school: Fairfax (Laveen)
- College: Arizona
- NFL draft: 2016: undrafted

Career history
- Green Bay Packers (2016–2018); Tennessee Titans (2019); Arizona Cardinals (2020)*; Jacksonville Jaguars (2020); Detroit Lions (2021)*
- * Offseason or practice squad member only

Career NFL statistics
- Total tackles: 62
- Sacks: 4.5
- Fumble recoveries: 1
- Pass deflections: 3
- Stats at Pro Football Reference

Reggie A. Gilbert Jr. (born April 1, 1993) is an American former professional football player who was a linebacker in the National Football League (NFL). He played college football for the Arizona Wildcats and was signed by the Green Bay Packers as an undrafted free agent in 2016. He was also a member of the Tennessee Titans, Arizona Cardinals, Jacksonville Jaguars and Detroit Lions.

== Professional career ==
Pre-draft measurables
Height	Weight	Arm length	Hand span	40-yard dash	10-yard split	20-yard split	20-yard shuttle	Three-cone drill	Vertical jump	Broad jump	Bench press
6 ft 2 7/8 in (1.90 m)	261 lb (118 kg)	32 1/4 in (0.82 m)	9 1/8 in (0.23 m)	4.88 s	1.72 s	2.79 s	4.53 s	7.31 s	33.5 in (0.85 m)	9 ft 6 in (2.90 m)	24 reps
All values from Pro Day

=== Green Bay Packers ===
Gilbert signed with the Green Bay Packers as an undrafted free agent on May 6, 2016. He was waived by the Packers on September 3, 2016 and was signed to the practice squad the next day. He signed a reserve/future contract with the Packers on January 24, 2017.

On September 2, 2017, Gilbert was waived by the Packers and was signed to the practice squad the next day. He was promoted to the active roster on December 22, 2017. Gilbert saw increased playing time during the 2018 season, and contributed with 38 tackles and 2.5 sacks. He was re-signed by the Packers as an exclusive rights free agent on March 11, 2019.

=== Tennessee Titans ===
On August 28, 2019, the Packers traded Gilbert to the Tennessee Titans in exchange for a seventh round pick in the 2020 NFL draft. Gilbert finished the 2019 regular season with 22 tackles, a sack, and one pass defense.

On March 10, 2020, Gilbert was re-signed by the Titans to a one-year contract with a salary of $750,000 per year. He was waived/injured on August 11, 2020, and reverted to the team's injured reserve list the next day. He was waived on September 8, 2020.

=== Arizona Cardinals ===
On October 21, 2020, Gilbert was signed to the Arizona Cardinals practice squad.

=== Jacksonville Jaguars ===
On November 24, 2020, Gilbert was signed by the Jacksonville Jaguars off of the Cardinals' practice squad. He was waived on December 14, 2020.

=== Detroit Lions ===
On June 7, 2021, Gilbert was signed by the Detroit Lions. He was waived on August 4, 2021.

== NFL career statistics ==
Regular season statistics
Year	Team	GP	GS	Tackles					Interceptions						Fumbles	
Year	Team	GP	GS	Total	Solo	Ast	Sck	SFTY	PDef	Int	Yds	Avg	Lng	TDs	FF	FR
2017	GB	2	0	2	2	0	1.0	0	0	0	0	0	0	0	0	0
2018	GB	16	0	38	27	11	2.5	0	2	0	0	0	0	0	0	1
2019	TEN	11	5	22	13	9	1.0	0	1	0	0	0	0	0	0	0
Total		29	5	62	42	20	4.5	0	3	0	0	0	0	0	0	1
Source: NFL.com
