= Cayleb Jones =

American football player (born 1993)

No. 16
- Position: Wide receiver

Personal information
- Born: March 21, 1993 (age 33); Dallas, Texas, U.S.
- Listed height: 6 ft 3 in (1.91 m)
- Listed weight: 209 lb (95 kg)

Career information
- High school: Stephen F. Austin (Austin, Texas)
- College: Texas (2012); Arizona (2013–2015)
- NFL draft: 2016: undrafted

Career history
- Philadelphia Eagles (2016); Minnesota Vikings (2016–2018)*
- * Offseason or practice squad member only
- Stats at Pro Football Reference

Cayleb Jones (born March 21, 1993) is an American former professional football wide receiver. He played college football at Texas in 2012 and then went on to play for the University of Arizona Wildcats from 2013 to 2015. After no team selected him during the 2016 NFL draft, Jones signed with the Philadelphia Eagles.

== Early life ==
Born in Dallas but raised in Austin, Texas, Jones is the son of Robert Jones, who earned All-America honors and was a Butkus Award finalist at East Carolina and played 10 seasons in the NFL as a linebacker with the Dallas Cowboys (1992–95), St. Louis Rams (1996–97), Miami Dolphins (1998–2000) and Washington Redskins (2001). He is the older brother of Jacksonville Jaguars wide receiver Zay Jones and Seattle Seahawks linebacker Vi Jones. He is also the nephew of Jeff Blake, who played as a quarterback at East Carolina from 1988 to 1991 and finished seventh in the 1991 Heisman Trophy balloting and earned a Pro Bowl nod with the Cincinnati Bengals in 1995. Jones began playing football at the age of 5. He attended Austin High School, where he was an All-American, three-time all-state, three-time all-area and three-time all-district performer at wide receiver. Jones played in the ESPN Champion Gridiron Kings game prior to his senior season. In 2011, his senior season, Jones tallied 59 catches for 1,025 yards and nine touchdowns along with three more scores, one through the ground and the other two through the air, helping lead Austin to an appearance in the first round of the state playoffs. He was named second-team All-USA by USA Today, first-team All-Centex by the Austin American Statesman, third-team All-State by the Texas Sports Writers Association and honorable mention All-State by the Associated Press (AP). He also earned first-team All-District 15-5A honors at wide receiver and earned second-team honors as a returner. Jones recorded 213 receptions for 3,025 yards and 27 touchdowns during his high school career. Following his senior season, Jones was invited to play in the 2012 Under Armour All-America Game. Jones also participated in track & field during his senior season; at the SAS Relays on March 5, 2011, he placed second in the long jump with a 20-foot-11-inch (6.38 m) leap and also earned a fourth-place finish in the 100-meter dash with a time of 11.46 seconds.

A member of ESPNU's top 150 national prospects, Jones was ranked as the 21st-best wide receiver and the 147th-best overall prospect in the nation by ESPNU. He was also ranked as the third-best overall prospect by the Sporting News. He was regarded as a four-star recruit by Rivals.com. On February 27, 2011, Jones announced via Facebook his commitment to the University of Texas.

== College career ==
In 2012, Jones transferred to the University of Arizona, where he played college football for the Arizona Wildcats Wildcats from 2012 to 2015. He appeared in 27 games, making 26 starts and finishing his Wildcats career with the 10th-most receiving yards (1,923) in school history with 1,926. He is also ranked tied-for-10th in career receptions with 129 and 12th in career receiving TDs with 14 in Arizona's record book.

In 2014, Jones instantly became Arizona's most prolific receiver, catching 73 balls for 1,019 yards in his first year in Rich Rodriguez' system.

=== Statistics ===
Season	Team	Games		Receiving					Rushing					Passing				
Season	Team	GP	GS	Rec	Yds	Avg	Lng	TD	Att	Yds	Avg	Lng	TD	Cmp	Att	Yds	Lng	Rtg
2012	Texas	10	0	2	35	17.0	23	0	1	12	12.0	12	0	0	0	0	0	0.0
2014	Arizona	14	13	73	1,019	14.0	85	9	0	0	0.0	0	0	0	0	0	0	0.0
2015	Arizona	13	13	56	907	16.2	78	5	0	0	0.0	0	0	1	1	25	25	310.0
Career		37	26	131	1,961	14.9	85	14	1	12	12.0	12	0	1	1	25	25	310.0

== Professional career ==
External videos
- Jones' NFL Combine workout

Pre-draft measurables
Height	Weight	Arm length	Hand span	40-yard dash	10-yard split	20-yard split	20-yard shuttle	Three-cone drill	Vertical jump	Broad jump	Bench press
6 ft 2 5/8 in (1.90 m)	209 lb (95 kg)	32 3/4 in (0.83 m)	9 1/4 in (0.23 m)	4.65 s	1.65 s	2.74 s	4.14 s	6.99 s	33.5 in (0.85 m)	9 ft 4 in (2.84 m)	9 reps
All values from NFL Combine except broad jump from pro day

=== Philadelphia Eagles ===
Jones signed with the Philadelphia Eagles as an undrafted free agent on May 5, 2016. He was waived by the Eagles on September 3, 2016, as part of final roster cuts.

=== Minnesota Vikings ===
On December 27, 2016, the Minnesota Vikings signed Jones to their practice squad. He signed a reserve/futures contract with the Vikings on January 2, 2017.

On September 2, 2017, Jones was waived by the Vikings and was signed to the practice squad the next day. He signed a reserve/future contract with the Vikings on January 23, 2018.

On April 30, 2018, Jones was suspended the first four games of the 2018 season for violating the league's policy on performance-enhancing substances. He was waived on August 31, 2018.

Jones was suspended the first six weeks of the 2019 season on August 30, 2019, for violating the league's policy on domestic violence stemming from an August 2018 arrest. He was reinstated from suspension on October 15, 2019.
