= Will Parks =

American football player (born 1994)

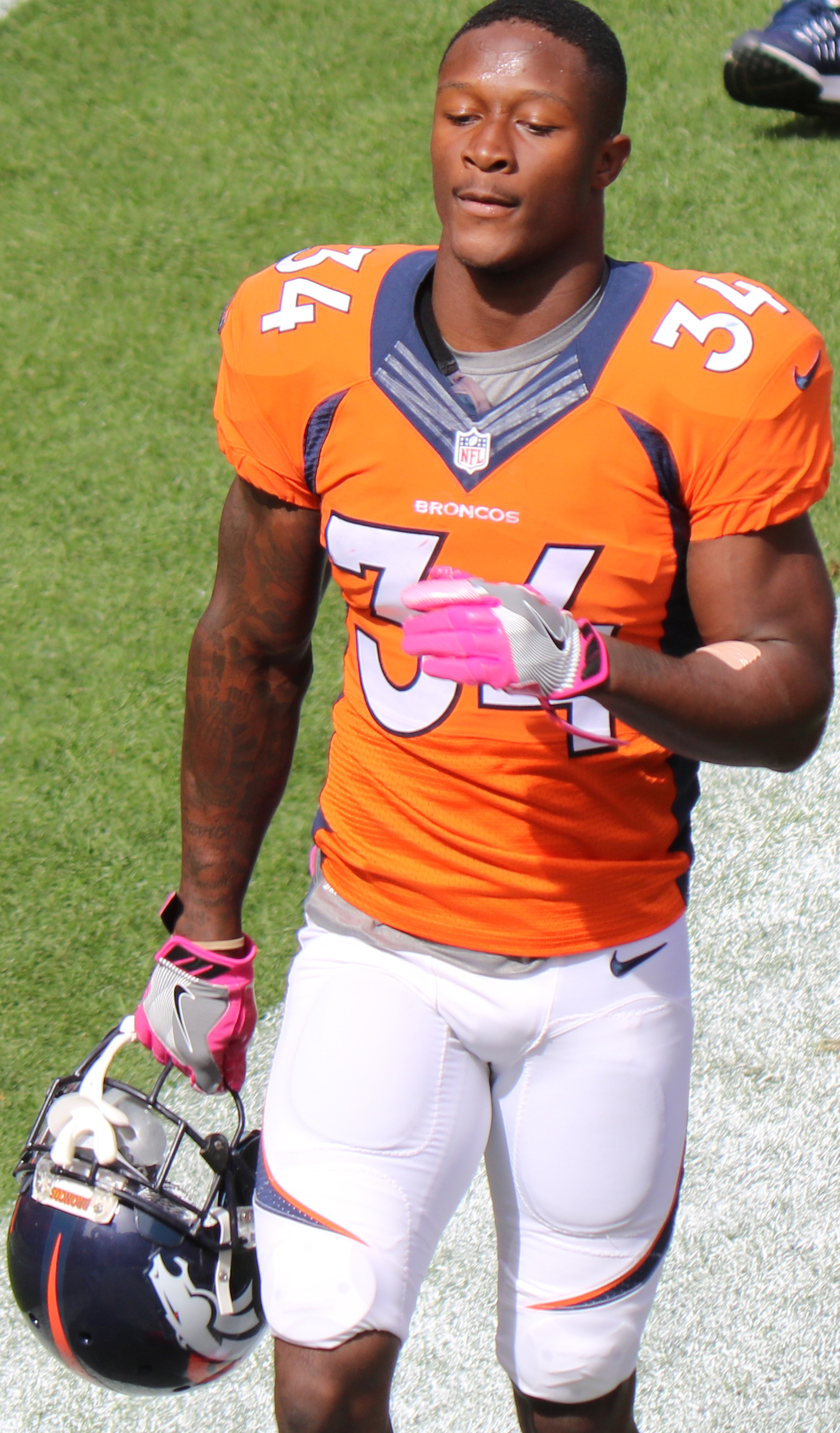
- Parks with the Denver Broncos in 2016

Profile
- Position: Safety

Personal information
- Born: July 29, 1994 (age 32); Philadelphia, Pennsylvania, U.S.
- Listed height: 6 ft 0 in (1.83 m)
- Listed weight: 200 lb (91 kg)

Career information
- High school: Germantown (Philadelphia, Pennsylvania)
- College: Arizona
- NFL draft: 2016: 6th round, 219th overall pick

Career history
- Denver Broncos (2016–2019); Philadelphia Eagles (2020); Denver Broncos (2020); Kansas City Chiefs (2021)*; San Francisco 49ers (2021)*; Miami Dolphins (2021); New York Jets (2021–2022)
- * Offseason or practice squad member only

Career NFL statistics
- Total tackles: 206
- Sacks: 2
- Forced fumbles: 2
- Fumble recoveries: 1
- Interceptions: 4
- Defensive touchdowns: 1
- Stats at Pro Football Reference

Will Parks (born July 29, 1994) is an American professional football safety. He was selected by the Denver Broncos in the sixth round of the 2016 NFL draft, and has played in the National Football League (NFL) for the Broncos, Philadelphia Eagles, Miami Dolphins, and New York Jets. He played college football for the Arizona Wildcats.

== Professional career ==
Pre-draft measurables
Height	Weight	Arm length	Hand span	40-yard dash	10-yard split	20-yard split	20-yard shuttle	Three-cone drill	Vertical jump	Broad jump	Bench press
6 ft 0 3/8 in (1.84 m)	204 lb (93 kg)	29 1/2 in (0.75 m)	10 in (0.25 m)	4.63 s	1.64 s	2.63 s	4.45 s	7.02 s	31.5 in (0.80 m)	9 ft 5 in (2.87 m)	21 reps
All values are from Arizona's Pro Day

=== Denver Broncos (first stint) ===
==== 2016 ====
The Denver Broncos selected Parks in the sixth round (219th overall) of the 2016 NFL draft. He was the 17th safety selected in 2016 and the second safety drafted by the Broncos, after third-round draft pick Justin Simmons.

On May 13, 2016, the Broncos signed Parks to a four-year, $2.44 million contract that includes a signing bonus of $100,356.

Throughout training camp, Parks competed with veteran Shiloh Keo for the backup strong safety role. Head coach Gary Kubiak named Parks the backup strong safety behind T. J. Ward to start the regular season.

He made his professional regular season debut in the Broncos' season-opening 21–20 victory over the Carolina Panthers. In Week 3, he made two solo tackles, two pass deflections, and had his first career interception off a pass by Andy Dalton during a 29–17 victory at the Cincinnati Bengals. On November 13, 2016, Parks recovered a blocked PAT attempt during the New Orleans Saints extra point and returned it for the game-winning two point score after teammate Justin Simmons leaped over the offensive line and blocked Wil Lutz's attempt to defeat the Saints 25–23 in the final 1:30 seconds. The play was challenged by the Saints after it appeared Parks may have stepped out of bounds during the return, but the ruling was upheld after it was determined there was not enough conclusive evidence showing Parks had stepped out of bounds.

Parks finished his rookie season with 22 combined tackles (17 solo), four pass deflections, a fumble recovery, one interception, and a touchdown in 16 games and zero starts while appearing on special teams and as a reserve safety on defense. The Broncos finished third in the season AFC West with a 9–7 record and Kubiak retired due to health concerns.

==== 2017 ====
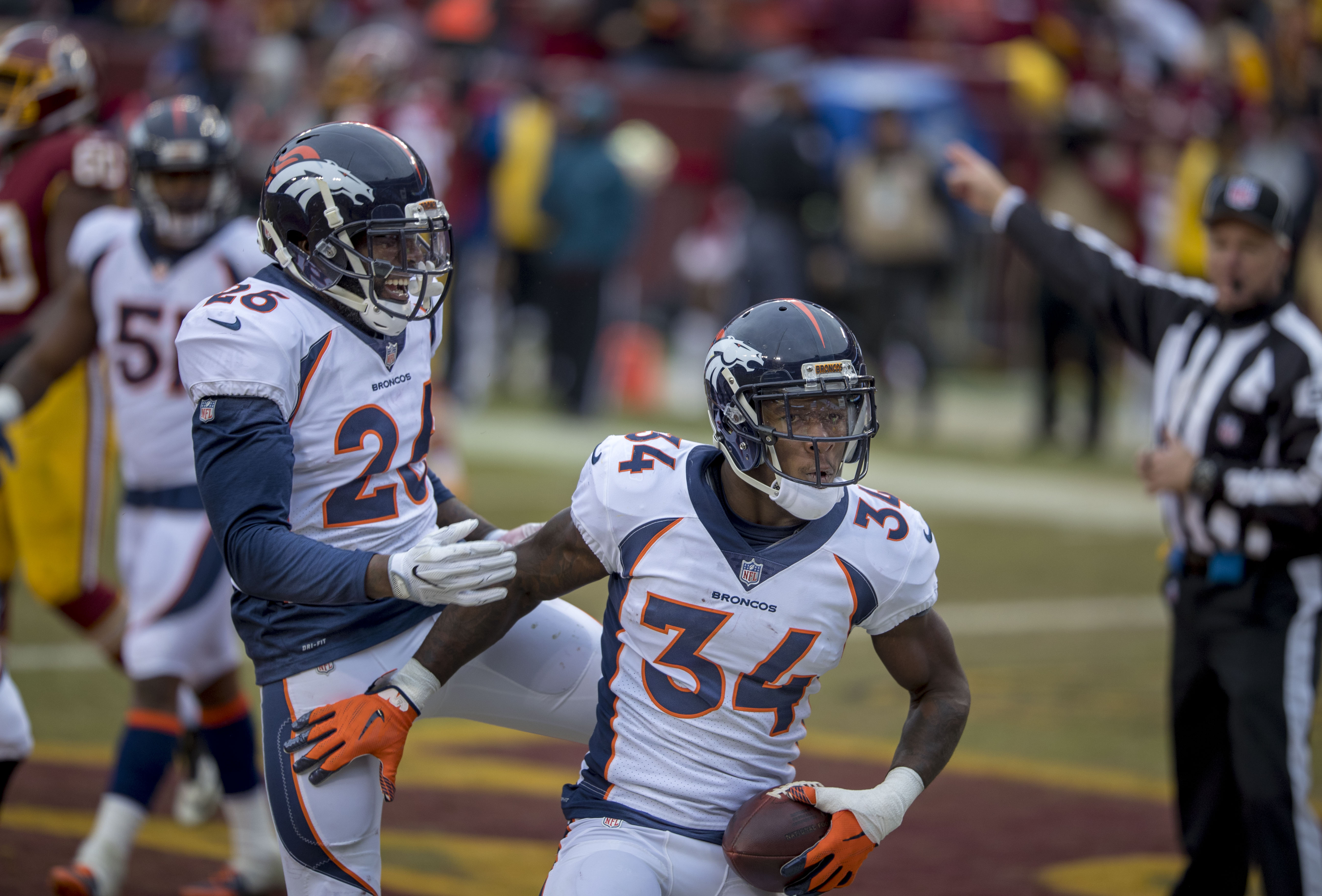
Parks (#34) with the Broncos in 2017

The Broncos hired Vance Joseph as their new head coach and Joe Woods as their new defensive coordinator, replacing Wade Phillips. Parks was named the backup free safety behind Darian Stewart to begin the regular season.

On October 30, 2017, Parks earned his first career start and recorded two solo tackles during a 29–19 loss at the Kansas City Chiefs. In Week 15, he started at strong safety after Simmons had been placed on injured reserve with a high ankle sprain. Parks went on to make a season-high seven combined tackles in their 25–13 win at the Indianapolis Colts. The following week, he collected two combined tackles, defended a pass, and intercepted a pass attempt by Kirk Cousins in the Bronco's 27–11 loss at the Washington Redskins. Parks finished the 2017 season with 51 combined tackles (36 solo), four pass deflections, and an interception in 16 games and four starts. He started three games at strong safety and appeared on special teams and as an extra defensive back during dime packages. In their first season under head coach Vance Joseph, the Broncos finished last in their division with a 5–11 record.

=== Philadelphia Eagles ===
On March 24, 2020, Parks signed a one-year contract with the Philadelphia Eagles. He was placed on injured reserve on September 6. Parks was activated on October 17. He was waived on December 1.

=== Denver Broncos (second stint) ===
On December 2, 2020, Parks was claimed off waivers by the Broncos.

=== Kansas City Chiefs ===
Parks signed with the Kansas City Chiefs on May 6, 2021. He was released by Kansas City on August 23.

=== San Francisco 49ers ===
On November 3, 2021, Parks was signed to the practice squad of the San Francisco 49ers.

=== Miami Dolphins ===
On November 23, 2021, Parks was signed by the Miami Dolphins off the 49ers practice squad. He was released by the Dolphins on December 21.

=== New York Jets ===
On December 21, 2021, Parks claimed off waivers by the New York Jets. He re-signed with the team on March 10, 2022. He was released on August 30, and signed to the practice squad the next day. He was elevated to the active roster on September 14. He was released on December 15, and re-signed to the practice squad. He was promoted to the active roster on January 7, 2023. Parks played in a total of 14 games for the Jets in 2022, collecting 17 tackles (10 solo) while working in a depth capacity. He was released by the Jets on June 8, 2023.

== Legal trouble ==
On June 2, 2017, Parks was arrested for misdemeanor harassment and non-physical domestic violence charges involving a former girlfriend. On March 1, 2018, the charges against him were dismissed.
