= Jared Wilson =

Jared Wilson may refer to:

- Jared Wilson (American football) (born 2003), American football player
- Jared Wilson (footballer) (born 1989), English footballer

== See also ==
- Murder of Arthur Warren, a perpetrator in the murder case named 'Jared Wilson'
