= Panther Lick =

Coordinates: 39°33′27″N 80°11′02″W

Panther Lick is a hollow located near Grant Town, West Virginia, United States. Approximately 2.5 miles (4.0 km) in length, the hollow runs from the Paw Paw Creek Valley in Grant Town to the Little Paw Paw Creek valley near McCurdysville. The valley is drained by Panther Lick Run, emptying into Paw Paw Creek.

== See also ==
- List of rivers of West Virginia
