= Grays Flat, West Virginia =

Grays Flat
- Unincorporated community
- Location within the state of West Virginia Grays Flat (the United States)
- Coordinates: 39°33′29″N 80°10′54″W
- Country: United States
- State: West Virginia
- County: Marion
- Time zone: UTC-5 (Eastern (EST))
  - Summer (DST): UTC-4 (EDT)
- GNIS feature ID: 1718060

Grays Flat (often "Grays Flats", or "Grey Flats") is an unincorporated community in Marion County, West Virginia, United States. It lies along the Paw Paw Creek, adjacent on the northeast of Grant Town.
