= Paw Paw Creek =

River in West Virginia, United States

Coordinates: 39°31′46″N 80°07′16″W

Paw Paw Creek is a 14.4-mile-long (23.2 km) tributary of the Monongahela River in West Virginia.

== Course ==
The headwaters of the creek begin in Monongalia County, north of Fairview, and empty into the river in Rivesville, coursing through the Marion County towns of Fairview, Grays Flat, Grant Town, Baxter, and Rivesville. The stream has a number of tributaries ("runs" or "licks") that empty into the creek along its course, including the Bennefield Prong, Ann's Run, Robinson Run, Panther Lick, Tarney Run, Little Paw Paw, and Woods Run.

The stream is named for the pawpaw tree (Asimina triloba), a native fruit-bearing tree of the eastern United States, which grows along its banks.

== See also ==
- List of rivers of West Virginia
