= 2016 Arizona Wildcats football team =

American college football season

2016 Arizona Wildcats football
- Conference: Pac-12 Conference
- South Division
- Record: 3–9 (1–8 Pac-12)
- Head coach: Rich Rodriguez (5th season)
- Co-offensive coordinators: Calvin Magee (5th season); Rod Smith (5th season)
- Offensive scheme: Spread option
- Defensive coordinator: Marcel Yates (1st season)
- Base defense: 4–2–5
- Captain: 14: Sani Fuimaono; Zach Hemmila *; Nate Phillips; Trey Griffey; Freddie Tagaloa; Josh Kern; Cody Ippolito; DaVonte' Neal; Tellas Jones; Samajie Grant; Matt Stagg; Matt Morin; Devin Holiday; Michael Barton
- Home stadium: Arizona Stadium

Uniform
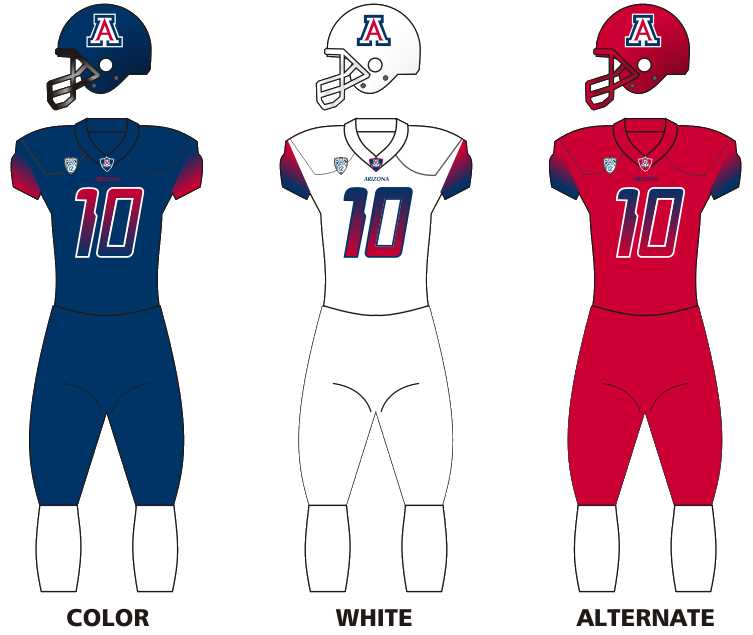

2016 Pac-12 Conference football standings
	Conf.			Overall
Team	W		L	W		L
North Division
No. 4 Washington xy$^	8	–	1	12	–	2
Washington State	7	–	2	8	–	5
No. 12 Stanford	6	–	3	10	–	3
California	3	–	6	5	–	7
Oregon State	3	–	6	4	–	8
Oregon	2	–	7	4	–	8
South Division
No. 17 Colorado xy	8	–	1	10	–	4
No. 3 USC	7	–	2	10	–	3
No. 23 Utah	5	–	4	9	–	4
Arizona State	2	–	7	5	–	7
UCLA	2	–	7	4	–	8
Arizona	1	–	8	3	–	9
Championship: Washington 41, Colorado 10
^ – College Football Playoff participant; $ – Conference champion; x – Division champion/co-champions; y – Championship game participant; Rankings from AP Poll

The 2016 Arizona Wildcats football team represented the University of Arizona in the 2016 season. The season was the Wildcats's 117th overall, 39th as a member of the Pac-12 Conference, and its sixth within the Pac-12 South Division. The team played their home games at Arizona Stadium in Tucson, Arizona for the 88th straight year. They were led by fifth-year head coach Rich Rodriguez. They finished the season 3–9, 1–8 in Pac-12 play to finish in last place in the South Division.

== Preseason ==
=== Draft picks ===
The NFL Draft will take place from April 28 through 30, 2016 and will be hosted by the Auditorium Theatre in Chicago, IL. The two following members of 2015 Arizona Wildcats football team were selected in the 2016 NFL draft.

Player	Position	Round	Pick	Team
Will Parks	S	6th	No. 219	Denver Broncos
Scooby Wright	LB	7th	No. 250	Cleveland Browns

=== Departures ===
The Wildcats would lose twenty-one senior football players to graduation as well as two junior football players (Junior linebacker and 2014 Pac-12 Defensive Player of the Year, Scooby Wright and unanimous first team All-American junior wide receiver Cayleb Jones) who would choose to forego their senior season in pursuit of an earlier NFL career. The Wildcats would lose six more players from the 2015 team due to various reasons (transfers and withdrawals will be filled out once spring practice occurs). Notable departures from the 2015 squad included.

Name	Number	Pos.	Year	Notes
Cayleb Jones	#1	WR	RS junior	foregoing for the senior season, declaring in the 2016 NFL draft, signed an undrafted free agent pick to the Philadelphia Eagles
Scooby Wright	#33	LB	Junior	foregoing for the senior season, declaring in the 2016 NFL draft, to Cleveland Browns
Jerrard Randall	#8	QB	RS senior	Graduated
David Richards	#4	WR	RS senior	Graduated, signed an undrafted free agent pick to Atlanta Falcons
Johnny Jackson	#30	WR	RS senior	Graduated
Jared Baker	#23	RB	RS senior	Graduated, signed an undrafted free agent pick to Arizona Cardinals
Cayman Bundage	#61	OL	Senior	Graduated
David Catalano	#68	OL	RS senior	Graduated
Kaige Lawrence	#75	OL	RS senior	Graduated
Lene Maiava	#77	OL	RS senior	Graduated, signed an undrafted free agent pick to Seattle Seahawks
Reggie Gilbert	#8	DL	RS senior	Graduated, signed an undrafted free agent pick to Green Bay Packers
Jeff Worthy	#55	DL	Senior	Graduated
Antonio Smothers	#4	LB	Senior	Graduated
Hayden Gregory	#49	LB	RS senior	Graduated
Sir Thomas Jackson	#53	LB	RS senior	Graduated
Jamar Allah	#7	S	RS senior	Graduated
Will Parks	#11	S	RS senior	Graduated, to Denver Broncos
Anthony Lopez	#28	S	RS senior	Graduated
Trevor Niemann	#38	S	Senior	Graduated
Casey Skoworn	#41	PK	RS senior	Graduated
Drew Riggleman	#39	K	Senior	Graduated
Jose Romero	#54	LS	RS senior	Graduated
Griffin Goudreau	#63	LS	Senior	Graduated
Sharif Williams	#90	DL	RS freshman	Medically retired from the knee injury
Jonathan Haden	#7	RB	RS junior	Transfer to TBA
T.D. Gross	#90	OL	RS senior	Graduated
Kendal Franklin	#43	LB	RS freshman	Dismissed, Transfer to McNeese State
Derrick Turituri	#45	LB	RS junior	dismissed from the football program
Anthony Fotu	#42	DL	Senior	dismissed from the football program

=== Transfers ===
In addition to the 2016 recruiting class, Arizona added two transfer football players in 2016 season. Linebacker Michael Barton transferred to Arizona in January from California. As a graduate transfer, Barton is immediately eligible to play in 2016, and he will have 1 year of his eligibility remaining. In 2011, Barton was a 4-star recruit out of De LaSalle High School in Concord, CA.

Wide receiver Zach Benjamin transferred to Arizona in May from Florida. Benjamin is immediately eligible to play in 2016, and he will have 2 years of eligibility remaining. In 2013, Benjamin was a 3-star recruit out of De LaSalle High School in Tampa, FL.

Name	Number	Pos.	Height	Weight	Year	Hometown	Notes
Michael Barton	14	Linebacker	6'1"	186	RS senior	Concord, CA	transferred to Arizona in January from California. As a graduate transfer, Barton is immediately eligible to play in 2016 season, and he will have 1 year of eligibility remaining.
Zach Benjamin	87	Wide receiver	6'1"	186	RS junior	Tampa, FL	transferred to Arizona in May from South Florida, Benjamin is immediately eligible to play in 2016 season, and he will have 2 years of eligibility remaining.

=== Recruiting ===
==== Position key ====
Back	B	Center	C	Cornerback	CB	Defensive back	DB
Defensive end	DE	Defensive lineman	DL	Defensive tackle	DT	End	E
Fullback	FB	Guard	G	Halfback	HB	Kicker	K
Kickoff returner	KR	Offensive tackle	OT	Offensive lineman	OL	Linebacker	LB
Long snapper	LS	Punter	P	Punt returner	PR	Quarterback	QB
Running back	RB	Safety	S	Tight end	TE	Wide receiver	WR

Arizona inked two junior college transfer players in February 2016, including 2-star walk-on safety Jalen Jenkins (Mesa CC) and 2-star wide receiver Shawn Poindexter (Glendale CC). All junior college transfers will enroll at Arizona in February 2016, participate in spring practice and be eligible to play in 2016.

Four freshmen signed financial aid agreements with Arizona in 2015 and will join with the junior college transfer as January 2016 enrollees. Financial aid agreements are binding on schools but non-binding on players. Early freshmen enrollees include 4-star offensive guard Michael Eletise (Kaiser) and 4-star quarterback Khalil Tate (Junipero Serra). Additionally, 4-star inside linebacker Kahi Neves (Brighton) expected to sign a financial aid agreement and enroll in January 2016.

National Signing Day is February 3, 2016. The incoming players listed below include the three junior college transfers that have signed binding letters of intent during the junior college transfer signing period, and the two incoming freshmen who have signed financial aid agreements to enroll in January 2016.

The Wildcats would go on to land another top 10 recruiting class in 2016 (#44 by Scout, #51 by Rivals, #45 by ESPN, and #43 by 247). The Wildcats has finish another top 10 in the Pac-12 recruitment class (#No. 9 by 247, Scout and ESPN, and #No.10 by Rivals)

College recruiting
Name	Hometown	School	Height	Weight	Commit date
Antonio Parks; CB (LQ)	Reserve, LA	East St. John HS	5 ft 8 in (1.73 m)	171 lb (78 kg)	Jul 4, 2014
Antonio Parks; CB (LQ)	Recruit ratings: Scout: Rivals: 247Sports: ESPN:				
Keenan Walker; OT (LQ)	Scottsdale, AZ	Chaparral HS	6 ft 6 in (1.98 m)	282 lb (128 kg)	Apr 26, 2014
Keenan Walker; OT (LQ)	Recruit ratings: Scout: Rivals: 247Sports: ESPN:				
Harper Sherman; OT (LQ)	New Westminster, BC, Canada	New Westminster Secondary School	N/A	260 lb (120 kg)	Aug 2, 2014
Harper Sherman; OT (LQ)	Recruit ratings: Scout: Rivals: 247Sports: ESPN:				
Jamie Nunley; TE-Y (LQ)	Murrieta, CA	Vista Murrieta HS	6 ft 5 in (1.96 m)	215 lb (98 kg)	Jun 6, 2014
Jamie Nunley; TE-Y (LQ)	Recruit ratings: Scout: Rivals: 247Sports: ESPN:				
Justin Holt; DT	Tucson, AZ	Salpointe Catholic HS	6 ft 1 in (1.85 m)	301 lb (137 kg)	Mar 7, 2015
Justin Holt; DT	Recruit ratings: Scout: Rivals: 247Sports: ESPN:				
Michael Eletise; OG	Honolulu, Hawaii	Kaiser HS	6 ft 3 in (1.91 m)	313 lb (142 kg)	Jul 28, 2015
Michael Eletise; OG	Recruit ratings: Scout: Rivals: 247Sports: ESPN:				
Khalil Tate; QB-DT	Gardena, CA	Junipero Serra HS	6 ft 0 in (1.83 m)	209 lb (95 kg)	Mar 16, 2015
Khalil Tate; QB-DT	Recruit ratings: Scout: Rivals: 247Sports: ESPN:				
Gavin Robertson; S	Auburn, WA	Auburn Mountainview HS	6 ft 11 in (2.11 m)	195 lb (88 kg)	Jul 18, 2015
Gavin Robertson; S	Recruit ratings: Scout: Rivals: 247Sports: ESPN:				
Kahi Neves; LB	South Jordan, UT	Brighton HS	6 ft 4 in (1.93 m)	233 lb (106 kg)	Dec 12, 2015
Kahi Neves; LB	Recruit ratings: Scout: Rivals: 247Sports: ESPN:				
Russell Halimon; RB	Acworth, GA	Allatoona HS	5 ft 10 in (1.78 m)	184 lb (83 kg)	Apr 18, 2015
Russell Halimon; RB	Recruit ratings: Scout: Rivals: 247Sports: ESPN:				
Devaughn Cooper; WR	Harbor City, CA	Narbonne HS	5 ft 11 in (1.80 m)	171 lb (78 kg)	Jul 18, 2015
Devaughn Cooper; WR	Recruit ratings: Scout: Rivals: 247Sports: ESPN:				
Isaiah Hayes; CB	Calabasas, CA	Calabasas HS	5 ft 11 in (1.80 m)	170 lb (77 kg)	Jun 10, 2015
Isaiah Hayes; CB	Recruit ratings: Scout: Rivals: 247Sports: ESPN:				
Jacob Colacion; ILB	La Habra, CA	La Habra HS	6 ft 1 in (1.85 m)	215 lb (98 kg)	Jul 7, 2015
Jacob Colacion; ILB	Recruit ratings: Scout: Rivals: 247Sports: ESPN:				
J. J. Taylor; RB	Corona, CA	Centennial HS	5 ft 5 in (1.65 m)	160 lb (73 kg)	Jul 18, 2015
J. J. Taylor; RB	Recruit ratings: Scout: Rivals: 247Sports: ESPN:				
Bryson Cain; OT	Temecula, CA	Great Oak HS	6 ft 4 in (1.93 m)	263 lb (119 kg)	Aug 24, 2015
Bryson Cain; OT	Recruit ratings: Scout: Rivals: 247Sports: ESPN:				
Tristan Cooper; S	El Paso, TX	Andress HS	6 ft 1 in (1.85 m)	180 lb (82 kg)	Jan 24, 2016
Tristan Cooper; S	Recruit ratings: Scout: Rivals: 247Sports: ESPN:				
Jarrius Wallace; S	Marrero, LA	John Ehret HS	6 ft 0 in (1.83 m)	185 lb (84 kg)	Jan 24, 2016
Jarrius Wallace; S	Recruit ratings: Scout: Rivals: 247Sports: ESPN:				
Jessie Britt; RB	Auburndale, FL	Auburndale HS	6 ft 0 in (1.83 m)	175 lb (79 kg)	Jan 25, 2016
Jessie Britt; RB	Recruit ratings: Scout: Rivals: 247Sports: ESPN:				
Francisco Nelson; DE	Lakeland, FL	Kathleen HS	6 ft 0 in (1.83 m)	175 lb (79 kg)	Jan 30, 2016
Francisco Nelson; DE	Recruit ratings: Scout: Rivals: 247Sports: ESPN:				
Shawn Poindexter; WR	Glendale, AZ	Glendale CC	6 ft 7 in (2.01 m)	215 lb (98 kg)	Feb 2, 2016
Shawn Poindexter; WR	Recruit ratings: Scout: Rivals: 247Sports: ESPN:				
Jalen Cochran; LB	Canton, MI	Canton HS	6 ft 3 in (1.91 m)	235 lb (107 kg)	Feb 3, 2016
Jalen Cochran; LB	Recruit ratings: Scout: Rivals: 247Sports: ESPN:				
Chacho Ulloa; DB	Corona, CA	Centennial High School	6 ft 0 in (1.83 m)	180 lb (82 kg)	Feb 3, 2016
Chacho Ulloa; DB	Recruit ratings: Scout: Rivals: 247Sports: ESPN:				
Lorenzo Burns; CB	Temecula, CA	Linfield Christian School	5 ft 11 in (1.80 m)	150 lb (68 kg)	Feb 3, 2016
Lorenzo Burns; CB	Recruit ratings: Scout: Rivals: 247Sports: ESPN:				
Justus Lee; WR	Argyle, TX	Liberty Christian School	5 ft 10 in (1.78 m)	180 lb (82 kg)	February 2, 2016 (Walk-On)
Justus Lee; WR	Recruit ratings: Scout: Rivals: 247Sports: ESPN:				
Jalen Jenkins; S	Chandler, AZ	Mesa CC	5 ft 11 in (1.80 m)	180 lb (82 kg)	February 2, 2016 (Walk-On)
Jalen Jenkins; S	Recruit ratings: Scout: Rivals: 247Sports: ESPN:				
Josh McCauley; C	Mesa, AZ	Red Mountain HS	6 ft 3 in (1.91 m)	264 lb (120 kg)	February 2, 2016 (Walk-On)
Josh McCauley; C	Recruit ratings: Scout: Rivals: 247Sports: ESPN:				
Donald Reiter; LS	Phoenix, AZ	Brophy College Preparatory	6 ft 0 in (1.83 m)	175 lb (79 kg)	February 2, 2016 (Walk-On)
Donald Reiter; LS	Recruit ratings: Scout: Rivals: 247Sports: ESPN:				
Gunther Johnson; QB	Anthem, AZ	Boulder Creek HS	6 ft 0 in (1.83 m)	210 lb (95 kg)	February 2, 2016 (Walk-On)
Gunther Johnson; QB	Recruit ratings: Scout: Rivals: 247Sports: ESPN:				
Jake Laudenslager; RB	Kentfield, CA	Marin Catholic HS	6 ft 1 in (1.85 m)	21 lb (9.5 kg)	February 2, 2016 (Walk-On)
Jake Laudenslager; RB	Recruit ratings: Scout: Rivals: 247Sports: ESPN:				
Joshua Mason; WR	San Diego, CA	San Diego HS	5 ft 11 in (1.80 m)	175 lb (79 kg)	February 2, 2016 (Walk-On)
Joshua Mason; WR	Recruit ratings: Scout: Rivals: 247Sports: ESPN:				
Jordan Bogardus; WR	Eastvale, CA	Norco HS	6 ft 9 in (2.06 m)	209 lb (95 kg)	February 2, 2016 (Walk-On)
Jordan Bogardus; WR	Recruit ratings: Scout: Rivals: 247Sports: ESPN:				
Peyton Morris; S	Norco, CA	Norco High School	5 ft 11 in (1.80 m)	190 lb (86 kg)	February 2, 2016 (Walk-On)
Peyton Morris; S	Recruit ratings: Scout: Rivals: 247Sports: ESPN:				
Edgar Gastelum; PK	Yuma, AZ	Arizona Western College	6 ft 1 in (1.85 m)	200 lb (91 kg)	February 2, 2016 (Walk-On)
Edgar Gastelum; PK	Recruit ratings: Scout: Rivals: 247Sports: ESPN:				
Corey Selenski; OLB	Dana Point, CA	Dana Hills HS	6 ft 1 in (1.85 m)	200 lb (91 kg)	February 2, 2016 (Walk-On)
Corey Selenski; OLB	Recruit ratings: Scout: Rivals: 247Sports: ESPN:				
Lee Anderson III; LB	Moreno Valley, CA	Rancho Verde HS	6 ft 3 in (1.91 m)	215 lb (98 kg)	February 2, 2016 (Walk-On)
Lee Anderson III; LB	Recruit ratings: Scout: Rivals: 247Sports: ESPN:				
Richard Merritt; LB	Clovis, CA	Buchanan HS	6 ft 1 in (1.85 m)	200 lb (91 kg)	February 2, 2016 (Walk-On)
Richard Merritt; LB	Recruit ratings: Scout: Rivals: 247Sports: ESPN:				
Overall recruit ranking: Scout: 44 Rivals: 51 247Sports: 43 ESPN: 45
‡ Refers to 40-yard dash; Note: In many cases, Scout, Rivals, 247Sports, On3, and ESPN may conflict in their listings of height, weight and 40 time.; In these cases, the average was taken. ESPN grades are on a 100-point scale.; Sources: "Arizona Football Commitment List". Rivals.; "2016 Arizona Commits". Scout.; "2016 Player Commitments – Arizona". ESPN.; "Scout.com Team Recruiting Rankings". Scout.; "2016 Team Ranking". Rivals.com.; "2016 Arizona Wildcats football team". 247Sports.

- RB Russell Halimon and WR Jessie Britt will grayshirt for the 2016 season because their enrollments were delayed and they did not receive scholarships.

=== 2016 spring football practice ===
The 2016 Wildcats had spring practice from February 12, 2016, to March 25, 2016.

2016 Arizona Wildcats Football Spring Game – Game summary

Quarter	1	2	3	4	Total
Navy Blue	0	0	0	0	0
White	0	0	0	0	0

at Arizona Stadium • Tucson, AZ

- Date: March 4, 2016
- Game time: TBA p.m. MT
- Game weather: Temperature: • Wind: • Weather:
- TV: Pac-12 Network

Offense

Player	Class	Position
Anu Solomon (12)	rsJr	QB
Nick Wilson (28)	Jr	RB
Tyrell Johnson (2)	Jr	WR
Trey Griffey (5)	rsSr	WR
Nate Phillips (6)	Sr	WR
Samajie Grant (10)	Sr	WR
Layth Friekh (58)	Jr	OL
Jacob Alsadek (78)	rsJr	OL
Freddie Tagaloa (72)	rsSr	OL

Defense

Player	Class	Position
Tellas Jones (1)	rsSr	S
Cam Denson (3)	Jr	CB
Devin Holiday (13)	Sr	CB
DaVonte' Neal (19)	rsSr	CB
Jarvis McCall Jr. (29)	rsJr	CB
Jake Matthews (47)	Sr	LB
Cody Ippolito (57)	rsJr	LB
Parker Zellers (93)	rsJr	DL
Calvin Allen (94)	rsJr	DL

Special teams

Player	Class	Position
Josh Pollack (9)	Jr	PK
Matt Aargon (26)	SR	P
Nick Reinhardt (56)	rsSO	LS

† Indicates player was a starter in 2015 but missed all of 2016 due to injury.

=== Fall camp ===
Pac-12 media days are set for July 14–15 in Hollywood, California. Prior to media days, The Wildcats were also picked by the Pac-12 media to finish fourth at South Division in the conference standings and received 87 first place votes, with the remainder going to top-picked UCLA in the South Division.

Fall camp is scheduled for August.

== Personnel ==
=== Coaching staff ===
2016 Arizona Wildcats coaches

Head coach

- Rich Rodriguez (5th year, West Virginia (1986))

Assistant coaches

- Calvin Magee – Associate head coach/co-offensive coordinator/running backs coach (5th year, South Florida (1990))
- Marcel Yates – Defensive coordinator and linebackers coach (1st year, Boise State (2000))
- Rod Smith – Co-offensive coordinator/quarterbacks coach (5th year, Glenville State (1997))
- Tony Dews – Assistant coach/wide receivers coach and passing game coordinator (5th year, Liberty (1996))
- Jamille Addae – Assistant coach/safeties coach (1st year, West Virginia (2005))
- Jim Michalczik – Assistant coach/offensive line coach (3rd year, Washington State (1988))
- Vince Amey – Assistant coach/defensive line coach (Arizona State (2010))
- Donte Williams – Assistant coach/cornerbacks coach (1st year, Idaho State (2006))
- Chris Singletary – Recruiting coordinator/player personnel director (1st year, Pittsburgh (2003))
- Charlie Ragle – Tight ends coach/special teams coordinator (5th year, Eastern New Mexico (1998))
- Chris Allen – Associate athletic director, co-strength and conditioning coach (5th year, West Virginia (2000))
- Troy Ramsey – Assistant coach/co-strength and conditioning coach (3rd year, North Texas (2007))
- Ovid Goulbourne – Assistant coach/strength and conditioning coach (4th year, West Virginia (2009))
- Brett Gerch – Assistant coach/co-strength and conditioning coach (3rd year, Appalachian State (2000))

Coaching staff sources: ArizonaWildcats.com

==== Coaching changes ====
- December 21, 2015 – Arizona cornerbacks coach David Lockwood will not returning in next season.
- December 21, 2015 – Arizona officially promoted from football analyst to assistant coach/safeties Jahmile Addae, replacing David Lockwood.
- January 4, 2016 – Arizona defensive coordinator Jeff Casteel and defensive line coach Bill Kirelawich will not returning to UofA next season.
- January 15, 2016 – Matt Caponi leaving Arizona to be West Virginia's safeties coach, reunited with Tony Gibson.
- January 17, 2016 – Arizona hires Boise State defensive coordinator Marcel Yates, replacing Jeff Casteel.
- January 17, 2016 – Arizona hires San José defensive coach Donte Williams to be a defensive assistant for cornerbacks.
- February 10, 2016 – Arizona officially promoted from football analyst to new defensive lineman coach Vince Amey, replacing Bill Kirelawich.

=== Roster ===
2016 Arizona Wildcats roster
Offense Quarterbacks: 10 Zach Werlinger – RS sophomore; 12 Anu Solomon (C) – RS junior; 13 Brandon Dawkins – RS sophomore; 14 Khalil Tate – Freshman; 16 Gunther Johnson – Freshman; Wide receivers: 2 Tyrell Johnson – Junior; 3 Cam Denson – Junior; 5 Trey Griffey (C) – RS senior; 6 Shun Brown – Sophomore; 7 DeVaughn Cooper – (redshirt) Freshman; 9 Tony Ellison – RS sophomore; 10 Samajie Grant – Senior; 11 Nate Phillips (C) – Senior; 18 Cedric Peterson – (redshirt) Freshman; 19 Shawn Poindexter – Junior; 24 Darick Holmes Jr. – (redshirt) Freshman; 83 Joshua Mason – Freshman; 84 Abraham Mendivil – (redshirt) Junior; 87 Zach Benjamin – (redshirt) Junior; 88 Jordan Bogardus – Freshman; 89 Justus Lee – Freshman	Running backs: 25 J. J. Taylor – Freshman; 28 Nick Wilson – Junior; 32 Jake Laudenslager – Freshman; 34 Zach Green – (redshirt) Junior; 38 Branden Leon – (redshirt) Freshman; 42 Richie Estrada – (redshirt) Sophomore; Offensive linemen: 50 Josh McCauley – Freshman; 54 Bryson Cain – Freshman; 55 Levi Walton – (redshirt) Sophomore; 58 Layth Friekh – Junior; 59 Christian Lopez – (redshirt) Freshman; 63 Keenan Walker – Freshman; 64 Nathan Elridge – (redshirt) Freshman; 67 Gerhard de Beer – (redshirt) Junior; 69 Christian Boettcher – (redshirt) Sophomore; 72 Freddie Tagaloa – (redshirt) Senior (C); 74 Alex Kosinski – (redshirt) Freshman; 75 Michael Eletise – Freshman; 76 Cody Creason – (redshirt) Freshman; 77 Harper Sharman – Freshman; 78 Jacob Alsadek – (redshirt) Junior	Tight ends: 8 Trevor Wood – (redshirt) Sophomore; 15 Matt Morin – (redshirt) Senior; 17 Josh Kern – (redshirt) Senior (C); 30 Jamardre Cobb – (FB) (redshirt) Sophomore; 48 Brian Anduze – (redshirt) Freshman; 85 Jamie Nunley – Freshman; Defense Defensive linemen: 50 Justin Holt – Freshman; 55 Darrell Cloy Jr – Sophomore; 60 Luca Bruno – (redshirt) Junior; 62 Aiulua Fanene – (redshirt) Senior; 86 Justin Belknap – (redshirt) Freshman; 91 Finton Connolly – (redshirt) Freshman; 92 Jack Banda – (redshirt) Junior; 93 Parker Zellers – (redshirt) Junior; 94 Calvin Allen – (redshirt) Junior; 96 Marcus Griffin – (redshirt) Sophomore; 99 Sani Fuimaono (C) – Senior; Linebackers: 7 Kahi Neves – Freshman; 11 Michael Barton – GS Senior; 15 Jacob Colacion – Freshman; 18 Brandon Rutt – (redshirt) Sophomore; 24 RJ Morgan – (redshirt) Junior; 28 Carrington Vaughn – (redshirt) Freshman; 32 DeAndre' Miller – (redshirt) Junior; 33 Corey Selenski – Freshman; 39 Franciso Nelson – Freshman; 47 Jake Matthews – Senior; 51 Lee Anderson III – Freshman; 52 Alex King – (redshirt) Senior; 53 Richard Merritt – Freshman; 56 John Kenny – (redshirt) Junior; 57 Cody Ippolito – (C) (redshirt) Senior; 59 Matthew Stagg – (redshirt) Senior; 81 Jalen Cochran – Freshman	Cornerbacks: 2 Lorenzo Burns – Freshman; 8 Antonio Parks – Freshman; 9 Dane Cruikshank – (redshirt) Junior; 10 Malcolm Holland – (redshirt) Freshman; 13 Devin Holiday – Senior; 15 Kwesi Mashack – Junior; 17 Jace Whittaker – Sophomore; 19 DaVonte' Neal – (C) (redshirt) Senior; 23 Devon Brewer – Sophomore; 27 Samuel Morrison – Sophomore; 29 Jarvis McCall Jr. – (redshirt) Junior; 35 Isaiah Strong – (redshirt) Junior; 41 Isaac Steele – Freshman; 49 Lee Pitts – Freshman; Safeties: 1 Tellas Jones – (redshirt) Senior; 3 Jarrius Wallace – Freshman; 5 Gavin Robertson Jr. – Freshman; 6 Demetrius Flannigan-Fowles – (redshirt) Freshman; 14 Paul Magloire – (redshirt) Senior; 20 Chacho Ulloa – Freshman; 21 Isaiah Hayes – Freshman; 25 Anthony Mariscal – (redshirt) Freshman; 31 Tristan Cooper – Freshman; 36 Jalen Jenkins – Freshman; 37 Carter Hehr – (redshirt) Junior; 40 Kyeler Burke – Freshman; 43 Tyler Grammar – (redshirt) Senior; 46 Albert Green – (redshirt) Freshman; 49 Peyton Morris – Freshman; Special teams Punters: 16 Jake Glatting – (redshirt) Sophomore; 26 Matt Aragon – (redshirt) Freshman; Kickers: 9 Josh Pollack – (redshirt) Sophomore; 82 Edgar Gastelum – (redshirt) Sophomore; Long snappers: 51 Donald Reiter – Freshman; 56 Nick Reinhardt – (redshirt) Sophomore
Sources: 2016 Arizona Wildcats roster

- Aug 8, 2016 – Zach Hemmila died in his sleep.
- – Orlando Bradford has dismissed from the football program after the arrest for domestic violence charges.

=== Depth chart ===
Defense

NB
Tellas Jones
Anthony Marsical
⋅

FS
Demetrius Flannigan-Fowles
Chacho Ulloa
⋅

OLB	ILB
DeAndre Miller	Cody Ippolito
John Kenny	Jake Matthews
⋅	⋅

SS
Paul Magloire Jr. or Michael Barton
Brandon Rutt
⋅

CB
Dane Cruikshank
Jace Whittaker
⋅

DE	DT	DT	DE
Justin Belknap	Parker Zellers	Sani Fuimaono	Jarvis McCall Jr.
Jack Banda	Aiulua Fanene	Luca Bruno	Isaiah Hayes
⋅	⋅	⋅	⋅

CB
Davonte' Neal
Devin Holiday
⋅

Offense

X
Trey Griffey
Cedric Peterson
⋅

SLOT
Shun Brown
Tyrell Johnson
DeVaughn Cooper

LT	LG	C	RG	RT
Layth Friekh	Freddie Tagaloa	Nathan Eldridge	Jacob Alsadek	Gerhard de Beer
Cody Creason	Christian Boettcher (RG)	Levi Walton	⋅	Alex Kosinski
⋅	⋅	⋅	⋅	⋅

WR
Samaje Grant
Shawn Poindexter
⋅

H
Nate Phillips
Cam Denson
⋅

QB
Anu Solomon or
Brandon Dawkins
Khalil Tate
Zach Werlinger

RB
Nick Wilson
J. J. Taylor
⋅

Special teams
PK Josh Pollack
PK Edgar Gastelum (KO)
P Josh Pollack
P Matt Aragon
KR Tyrell Johnson
J. J. Taylor (PR)
Shun Brown
PR Nate Phillips
LS Nick Reinhardt
Donald Reiter
H Matt Morin
Zach Werlinger

Depth Chart Source: 2016 Arizona Wildcats Football Fact Book

=== Injury report ===
Player	Position	Status	Injury	Date of Injury	Date of Return (Anticipated)
Matt Morin	TE-H	Out	Foot	Sept. 1st	Sept. 8
Tony Ellison	WR	Out	Knee	Sept. 1st	TBA
Anu Solomon	QB	Questionable	Knee	Sept. 8	TBA
Tellas Jones	S	Questionable	Ankle	Sept. 8	TBA
Jacob Colacion	DL	Out	Knee	TBA	TBA
Keenan Walker	OL	Out	Knee	TBA	TBA
Brion Anduze	TE	Out	Knee	TBA	2017
Sammy Morrison	CB	Questionable	Undisclosed injury	TBA	TBA
Cody Ippolito	LB	Questionable	Suspension	TBA	TBA
Nate Phillips	WR	Questionable	Undisclosed injury	Sept 3	Sept 17
Jamardre Cobb	TE-FB	Out	Knee	Sept 15	TBA

== Regular season ==
=== Schedule ===
Arizona announced its 2016 football schedule on November 24, 2015. The 2016 schedule consists of 7 home, 4 away, and 1 neutral site game in the regular season. Arizona will face all five Southern Division opponents: Arizona State, Colorado, UCLA, USC and Utah. They will also face four Northern Division opponents: Oregon State, Stanford, Washington, and Washington State. Arizona is not scheduled to play Pac-12 North opponents California or Oregon.

The team will scheduled to play three non-conference games, two home games against Hawaii of the MWC, Grambling State of the FCS' SWAC and travel to Glendale, AZ to play BYU of the (NCAA Division I FBS independent) for the Cactus Kickoff at University of Phoenix Stadium, a non—conference game at a neutral site one neutral site game.

Date	Time	Opponent	Site	TV	Result	Attendance
September 3	7:30 p.m.	vs. BYU*	University of Phoenix Stadium; Glendale, AZ (Cactus Kickoff)	FS1	L 16–18	50,528
September 10	7:45 p.m.	Grambling State*	Arizona Stadium; Tucson, AZ	P12N	W 31–21	45,686
September 17	7:45 p.m.	Hawaii*	Arizona Stadium; Tucson, AZ	P12N	W 47–28	50,116
September 24	7:30 p.m.	No. 9 Washington	Arizona Stadium; Tucson, AZ	P12N	L 28–35 ^{OT}	48,747
October 1	7:30 p.m.	at UCLA	Rose Bowl; Pasadena, CA	ESPN	L 24–45	68,013
October 8	7:00 p.m.	at No. 24 Utah	Rice-Eccles Stadium; Salt Lake City, UT	FS1	L 23–36	45,917
October 15	12:30 p.m.	USC	Arizona Stadium; Tucson, AZ	FOX	L 14–48	55,463
October 29	8:00 p.m.	Stanford^{†}	Arizona Stadium; Tucson, AZ	FS1	L 10–34	46,740
November 5	1:00 p.m.	at No. 25 Washington State	Martin Stadium; Pullman, WA	P12N	L 7–69	33,547
November 12	8:00 p.m.	No. 16 Colorado	Arizona Stadium; Tucson, AZ	FS1	L 24–49	41,068
November 19	8:30 p.m.	at Oregon State	Reser Stadium; Corvallis, OR	P12N	L 17–42	35,059
November 25	7:30 p.m.	Arizona State	Arizona Stadium; Tucson, AZ (rivalry)	ESPN	W 56–35	50,197
*Non-conference game; ^{†}Homecoming; Rankings from AP Poll released prior to game; All times are in Mountain time

Schedule source: FBschedules.com

Legend
Arizona win
Arizona loss

=== vs BYU ===
BYU Cougars (0–0) vs Arizona Wildcats (0–0) – Game summary

Quarter	1	2	3	4	Total
Cougars	0	9	0	9	18
Wildcats	0	0	3	13	16

at University of Phoenix Stadium • Glendale, AZ

- Date: September 3, 2016
- Game time: 7:30 p.m.
- Game weather: None (Retractable roof closed)
- Game attendance: 50,528
- Referee: Kevin Mar
- TV: FS1

Game information

First quarter

No scoring plays

Second quarter

- (10:42) BYU – Rhett Almond 24-yard field goal (Drive: 8 plays, 45 yards, 3:02; BYU 3–0)
- (2:53) BYU – Brayd El-Bakri 1-yard run, kick failed (Drive: 11 plays, 65 yards, 5:53; BYU 9–0)

Third quarter

- (5:59) ARIZ – Josh Pollack 46-yard field goal (Drive: 9 plays, 69 yards, 3:39; BYU 9–3)

Fourth quarter

- (11:36) BYU – Colby Pearson 6-yard pass from Taysom Hill, two-point pass failed (Drive: 10 plays, 80 yards, 4:30; BYU 15–3)
- (9:33) ARIZ – Nick Wilson 15-yard run, Josh Pollack kick (Drive: 7 plays, 75 yards, 2:03; BYU 15–10)
- (1:26) ARIZ – Nick Wilson 49-yard run, two-point pass failed (Drive: 4 plays, 80 yards, 1:38; Arizona 16–15)
- (0:04) BYU – Jake Oldroyd 33-yard field goal (Drive: 9 plays, 53 yards, 1:16; BYU 18–16)

Statistics	BYU	ARIZ
First downs	24	17
Total yards	415	328
Rushing yards	47–213	26–115
Passing yards	202	213
Passing: Comp–Att–Int	21–29–0	20–30–2
Time of possession	37:37	22:23

Team	Category	Player	Statistics
BYU	Passing	Taysom Hill	21/29, 202 yards, TD
BYU	Rushing	Jamaal Williams	29 carries, 162 yards
BYU	Receiving	Moroni Laulu-Pututau	4 receptions, 49 yards
Arizona	Passing	Anu Solomon	20/30, 213 yards, 2 INT
Arizona	Rushing	Nick Wilson	17 carries, 142 yards, 2 TD
Arizona	Receiving	Nate Phillips	7 receptions, 69 yards

=== vs Grambling State ===
Grambling State Tigers (1–0) vs Arizona Wildcats (0–1) – Game summary

Quarter	1	2	3	4	Total
Tigers	7	14	0	0	21
Wildcats	0	3	21	7	31

at Arizona Stadium • Tucson, AZ

- Date: September 10, 2016
- Game time: 8:00 p.m.
- Game weather: Partly cloudy, 87 °F (31 °C)
- Game attendance: 45,686
- Referee: Land Clark
- TV: Pac-12 Network

Game information

First quarter

- (12:05) GRAM – Verlan Hunter 2-yard pass from Devante Kincaid, Jonathan Wallace kick (Drive: 7 plays, 81 yards, 2:55; Grambling State 7–0)

Second quarter

- (11:55) GRAM – Devohn Lindsey 26-yard pass from Devante Kincaid, Jonathan Wallace kick (Drive: 12 plays, 86 yards, 5:06; Grambling State 14–0)
- (4:37) ARIZ – Josh Pollack 31-yard field goal (Drive: 7 plays, 83 yards, 1:37; Grambling State 14–3)
- (0:16) GRAM – Martez Carter 1-yard run, Jonathan Wallace kick (Drive: 12 plays, 75 yards, 4:21; Grambling State 21–3)

Third quarter

- (12:07) ARIZ – Brandon Dawkins 2-yard run, Josh Pollack kick (Drive: 9 plays, 70 yards, 2:47; Grambling State 21–10)
- (2:42) ARIZ – Trey Griffey 34-yard pass from Brandon Dawkins, Josh Pollack kick (Drive: 5 plays, 55 yards, 1:29; Grambling State 21–17)
- (0:42) ARIZ – Nick Wilson 11-yard run, Josh Pollack kick (Drive: 3 plays, 29 yards, 0:51; Arizona 24–21)

Fourth quarter

- (12:08) ARIZ – Brandon Dawkins 21-yard run, Josh Pollack kick (Drive: 4 plays, 29 yards, 1:49; Arizona 31–21)

Statistics	GRAM	ARIZ
First downs	28	21
Total yards	462	445
Rushing yards	36–60	47–222
Passing yards	402	223
Passing: Comp–Att–Int	31–44–3	15–30–0
Time of possession	32:57	27:03

Team	Category	Player	Statistics
Grambling State	Passing	Trevon Cherry	16/25, 209 yards, 3 INT
Grambling State	Rushing	Martez Carter	13 carries, 43 yards, TD
Grambling State	Receiving	Chad Williams	13 receptions, 152 yards
Arizona	Passing	Brandon Dawkins	15/29, 223 yards, TD
Arizona	Rushing	Nick Wilson	24 carries, 116 yards, TD
Arizona	Receiving	Samajie Grant	5 receptions, 95 yards

Arizona played their home opener against Grambling State, which was the Wildcats' first home game since the 2011–2013's expansion to over 56,000 in Tucson. This was the first-ever meeting between the two teams. (Arizona attempted to hire legendary longtime Grambling head coach Eddie Robinson in 1968, which would have made him the first African American head coach of an NCAA Division I-A football program at a predominantly White college, but Robinson declined the offer.) Arizona played their home opener against Grambling State, which was the Wildcats' first home game since the 2011–2013's expansion to over 56,000 in Tucson. This was the first-ever meeting between the two teams. (Arizona attempted to hire legendary longtime Grambling head coach Eddie Robinson in 1968, which would have made him the first African American head coach of an NCAA Division I-A football program at a predominantly White college, but Robinson declined the offer.)

Grambling's legendary World Famed Tiger Band performed with the Arizona marching band for the National Anthem, and also during the halftime show in Tucson. Both bands famously performed for the first NFL Super Bowl in 1967.

=== vs Hawaii ===
Hawaii Rainbow Warriors (1–2) vs Arizona Wildcats (1–1) – Game summary

Quarter	1	2	3	4	Total
Rainbow Warriors	7	0	7	14	28
Wildcats	20	14	10	3	47

at Arizona Stadium • Tucson, AZ

- Date: September 17, 2016
- Game time: 8:00 p.m.
- Game weather: Clear, 84 °F (29 °C)
- Game attendance: 50,116
- Referee: Brad Van Vark
- TV: Pac-12 Network

Game information

First quarter

- (9:13) ARIZ – Brandon Dawkins 24-yard run, two-point run failed (Drive: 8 plays, 88 yards, 2:39; Arizona 6–0)
- (5:00) ARIZ – Brandon Dawkins 14-yard run, Josh Pollack kick (Drive: 6 plays, 82 yards, 1:59; Arizona 13–0)
- (4:44) ARIZ – Tyrell Johnson 24-yard run, Josh Pollack kick (Drive: 1 play, 24 yards, 0:09; Arizona 20–0)
- (1:10) HAW – John Ursua 15-yard pass from Ikaika Woolsey, Rigoberto Sanchez kick (Drive: 9 plays, 81 yards, 3:29; Arizona 20–7)

Second quarter

- (7:17) ARIZ – Shun Brown 56-yard pass from Brandon Dawkins, Josh Pollack kick (Drive: 4 plays, 75 yards, 1:14; Arizona 27–7)
- (1:44) ARIZ – Brandon Dawkins 6-yard run, Josh Pollack kick (Drive: 9 plays, 80 yards, 3:47; Arizona 34–7)

Third quarter

- (9:27) ARIZ – Josh Pollack 27-yard field goal (Drive: 12 plays, 81 yards, 5:28; Arizona 37–7)
- (4:04) HAW – Steven Lakalaka 1-yard run, Rigoberto Sanchez kick (Drive: 13 plays, 78 yards, 5:18; Arizona 37–14)
- (3:28) ARIZ – J.J. Taylor 61-yard run, Josh Pollack kick (Drive: 2 plays, 51 yards, 0:36; Arizona 44–14)

Fourth quarter

- (14:54) HAW – Steven Lakalaka 6-yard run, Rigoberto Sanchez kick (Drive: 10 plays, 67 yards, 3:27; Arizona 44–21)
- (10:00) ARIZ – Josh Pollack 28-yard field goal (Drive: 11 plays, 61 yards, 4:52; Arizona 47–21)
- (4:25) HAW – Dru Brown 3-yard run, Rigoberto Sanchez kick (Drive: 12 plays, 74 yards, 5:27; Arizona 47–28)

Statistics	HAW	ARIZ
First downs	25	28
Total yards	429	582
Rushing yards	38–168	49–347
Passing yards	429	582
Passing: Comp–Att–Int	21–43–1	16–21–0
Time of possession	31:36	28:24

Team	Category	Player	Statistics
Hawaii	Passing	Dru Brown	10/18, 144 yards
Hawaii	Rushing	Steve Lakalaka	16 carries, 63 yards, 2 TD
Hawaii	Receiving	John Ursua	5 receptions, 83 yards, TD
Arizona	Passing	Brandon Dawkins	16/21, 235 yards, TD
Arizona	Rushing	J.J. Taylor	18 carries, 168 yards, TD
Arizona	Receiving	Shun Brown	5 receptions, 92 yards, TD

=== vs No. 9 Washington ===
No. 9 Washington Huskies (3–0) vs Arizona Wildcats (2–1) – Game summary

Quarter	1	2	3	4	OT	Total
#9 Huskies	0	14	7	7	7	35
Wildcats	7	7	0	14	0	28

at Arizona Stadium • Tucson, AZ

- Date: September 24, 2016
- Game time: 7:30 p.m.
- Game weather: Clear, 74 °F (23 °C)
- Game attendance: 48,474
- Referee: Michael Mothershed
- TV: Pac-12 Network

Game information

First quarter

- (9:01) ARIZ – J.J. Taylor 1-yard run, Josh Pollack kick (Drive: 15 plays, 75 yards, 5:59; Arizona 7–0)

Second quarter

- (9:45) WASH – John Ross 32-yard run, Cameron Van Winkle kick (Drive: 8 plays, 97 yards, 3:54; Tied 7–7)
- (9:06) ARIZ – Brandon Dawkins 79-yard run, Josh Pollack kick (Drive: 2 plays, 94 yards, 0:33; Arizona 14–7)
- (5:28) WASH – John Ross 12-yard pass from Jake Browning, Cameron Van Winkle kick (Drive: 7 plays, 75 yards, 3:38; Tied 14–14)

Third quarter

- (11:24) WASH – Jake Browning 3-yard run, Cameron Van Winkle kick (Drive: 7 plays, 75 yards, 3:36; Washington 21–14)

Fourth quarter

- (4:45) ARIZ – Brandon Dawkins 2-yard run, Josh Pollack kick (Drive: 5 plays, 66 yards, 1:59; Tied 21–21)
- (3:25) WASH – Lavon Coleman 55-yard run, Cameron Van Winkle kick (Drive: 3 plays, 66 yards, 1:15; Washington 28–21)
- (0:17) ARIZ – Josh Kern 3-yard pass from Brandon Dawkins, Josh Pollack kick (Drive: 9 plays, 75 yards, 3:08; Tied 28–28)

Overtime

- WASH – Dante Pettis 4-yard pass from Jake Browning, Cameron Van Winkle kick (Drive: 11 plays, -8 yards, 0:12; Washington 35–28)

Statistics	WASH	ARIZ
First downs	24	23
Total yards	512	475
Rushing yards	51–352	43–308
Passing yards	160	167
Passing: Comp–Att–Int	14–21–1	19–31–1
Time of possession	34:58	25:02

Team	Category	Player	Statistics
Washington	Passing	Jake Browning	14/21, 160 yards, 2 TD, INT
Washington	Rushing	Lavon Coleman	11 carries, 181 yards, TD
Washington	Receiving	Chico McClatcher	2 receptions, 72 yards
Arizona	Passing	Brandon Dawkins	19/31, 167 yards, TD, INT
Arizona	Rushing	Brandon Dawkins	13 carries, 176 yards, 2 TD
Arizona	Receiving	Shun Brown	7 receptions, 114 yards

=== at UCLA ===
Arizona Wildcats (2–2) at UCLA Bruins (2–2) – Game summary

Quarter	1	2	3	4	Total
Wildcats	7	0	3	14	24
Bruins	14	0	10	21	45

at Rose Bowl • Pasadena, CA

- Date: October 1, 2016
- Game time: 7:30 p.m.
- Game weather: Dark, 74 °F (23 °C)
- Game attendance: 68,013
- Referee: Terry Leyden
- TV: ESPN

Game information

First quarter

- (11:07) ARIZ – Samajie Grant 12-yard pass from Brandon Dawkins, Josh Pollack kick (Drive: 5 plays, 79 yards, 1:36; Arizona 7–0)
- (9:18) UCLA – Nate Starks 2-yard run, JJ Molson kick (Drive: 5 plays, 40 yards, 1:39; Tied 7–7)
- (0:00) UCLA – Kenneth Walker III 62-yard pass from Josh Rosen, JJ Molson kick (Drive: 1 play, 62 yards, 0:14; UCLA 14–7)

Second quarter

No scoring plays

Third quarter

- (12:38) UCLA – Theo Howard 19-yard pass from Josh Rosen, JJ Molson kick (Drive: 6 plays, 65 yards, 2:22; UCLA 21–7)
- (9:12) UCLA – JJ Molson 39-yard field goal (Drive: 4 plays, 8 yards, 2:03; UCLA 24–7)
- (2:53) ARIZ – Josh Pollack 20-yard field goal (Drive: 15 plays, 87 yards, 6:10; UCLA 24–10)

Fourth quarter

- (14:15) UCLA – Josh Rosen 1-yard run, JJ Molson kick (Drive: 9 plays, 68 yards, 3:34; UCLA 31–10)
- (11:04) ARIZ – Shun Brown 31-yard pass from Khalil Tate, Josh Pollack kick (Drive: 9 plays, 80 yards, 3:07; UCLA 31–17)
- (8:37) UCLA – Kenneth Walker III 29-yard pass from Josh Rosen, JJ Molson kick (Drive: 5 plays, 45 yards, 2:17; UCLA 38–17)
- (3:30) UCLA – Darren Andrews 26-yard run, JJ Molson kick (Drive: 7 plays, 96 yards, 3:40; UCLA 45–17)
- (0:38) ARIZ – Cam Denson 13-yard pass from Khalil Tate, Josh Pollack kick (Drive: 9 plays, 76 yards, 2:47; UCLA 45–24)

Statistics	ARIZ	UCLA
First downs	22	20
Total yards	387	475
Rushing yards	49–242	32–125
Passing yards	145	350
Passing: Comp–Att–Int	13–31–0	20–37–0
Time of possession	31:32	28:28

Team	Category	Player	Statistics
Arizona	Passing	Brandon Dawkins	8/17, 73 yards, TD
Arizona	Rushing	Khalil Tate	15 carries, 79 yards
Arizona	Receiving	Shun Brown	4 receptions, 50 yards, TD
UCLA	Passing	Josh Rosen	20/37, 350 yards, 3 TD
UCLA	Rushing	Nate Starks	17 carries, 80 yards, TD
UCLA	Receiving	Kenneth Walker III	4 receptions, 114 yards, 2 TD

=== at No. 24 Utah ===
Arizona Wildcats (2–3) at No. 24 Utah Utes (4–1) – Game summary

Quarter	1	2	3	4	Total
Wildcats	7	7	0	9	23
#24 Utes	3	9	17	7	36

at Rice-Eccles Stadium • Salt Lake City, UT

- Date: October 8, 2016
- Game time: 7:00 p.m.
- Game weather: Clear, 59 °F (15 °C)
- Game attendance: 45,917
- Referee: Michael Batlan
- TV: FS1

Game information

First quarter

- (14:49) ARIZ – Shun Brown 75-yard pass from Brandon Dawkins, Josh Pollack kick (Drive: 1 play, 75 yards, 0:11; Arizona 7–0)
- (5:01) UTAH – Andy Phillips 28-yard field goal (Drive: 12 plays, 62 yards, 5:36; Arizona 7–3)

Second quarter

- (7:54) ARIZ – Brandon Dawkins 6-yard run, Josh Pollack kick (Drive: 10 plays, 72 yards, 4:37; Arizona 14–3)
- (4:38) UTAH – Team safety (Arizona 14–5)
- (0:55) UTAH – Tyrone Smith 3-yard pass from Troy Williams, Andy Phillips kick (Drive: 8 plays, 47 yards, 3:35; Arizona 14–12)

Third quarter

- (13:12) UTAH – Troy Williams 2-yard run, Andy Phillips kick (Drive: 4 plays, 68 yards, 1:41; Utah 19–14)
- (5:35) UTAH – Armand Shyne 26-yard run, Andy Phillips kick (Drive: 5 plays, 74 yards, 2:10; Utah 26–14)
- (2:16) UTAH – Andy Phillips 35-yard field goal (Drive: 6 plays, 29 yards, 2:34; Utah 29–14)

Fourth quarter

- (9:04) ARIZ – Josh Pollack 37-yard field goal (Drive: 11 plays, 63 yards, 4:15; Utah 29–17)
- (5:10) UTAH – Troy Williams 1-yard run, Andy Phillips kick (Drive: 7 plays, 67 yards, 3:49; Utah 36–17)
- (4:15) ARIZ – Samajie Grant 63-yard pass from Khalil Tate, two-point pass failed (Drive: 3 plays, 75 yards, 0:55; Utah 36–23)

Statistics	ARIZ	UTAH
First downs	21	23
Total yards	475	455
Rushing yards	37–127	45–210
Passing yards	348	245
Passing: Comp–Att–Int	16–29–3	13–29–0
Time of possession	24:10	35:50

Team	Category	Player	Statistics
Arizona	Passing	Brandon Dawkins	11/20, 243 yards, TD, 2 INT
Arizona	Rushing	Brandon Dawkins	14 carries, 49 yards, TD
Arizona	Receiving	Trey Griffey	4 receptions, 109 yards
Utah	Passing	Troy Williams	13/29, 245 yards, TD
Utah	Rushing	Armand Shyne	19 carries,109 yards, TD
Utah	Receiving	Evan Moeai	3 receptions, 81 yards

=== vs USC ===
USC Trojans (3–3) vs Arizona Wildcats (2–4) – Game summary

Quarter	1	2	3	4	Total
Trojans	14	20	7	7	48
Wildcats	7	0	0	7	14

at Arizona Stadium • Tucson, AZ

- Date: October 15, 2016
- Game time: 12:30 p.m.
- Game weather: Sunny and Clear, 93 °F (34 °C)
- Game attendance: 55,463
- Referee: Mark Duddy
- TV: Fox

Game information

First quarter

- (10:29) USC – Ronald Jones 5-yard run, Matt Boermeester kick (Drive: 10 plays, 73 yards, 4:31; USC 7–0)
- (5:40) ARIZ – Khalil Tate 3-yard run, Josh Pollack kick (Drive: 5 plays, 38 yards, 1:30; Tied 7–7)
- (0:04) USC – Deonta Burnett 11-yard pass from Sam Darnold, Matt Boermeester kick (Drive: 14 plays, 75 yards, 5:36; USC 14–7)

Second quarter

- (13:42) USC – Daniel Imatorbhebhe 8-yard pass from Sam Darnold, Matt Boermeester kick (Drive: 2 plays, 10 yards, 1:05; USC 21–7)
- (4:07) USC – JuJu Smith-Schuster 3-yard pass from Sam Darnold, two-point run failed (Drive: 3 plays, 15 yards, 1:08; USC 27–7)
- (0:23) USC – JuJu Smith-Schuster 39-yard pass from Sam Darnold, Matt Boermeester kick (Drive: 8 plays, 80 yards, 2:38; USC 34–7)

Third quarter

- (10:29) USC – JuJu Smith-Schuster 46-yard pass from Sam Darnold, Matt Boermeester kick (Drive: 6 plays, 85 yards, 2:38; USC 41–7)

Fourth quarter

- (13:13) ARIZ – Samajie Grant 7-yard pass from Matt Morin, Josh Pollack kick (Drive: 11 plays, 63 yards, 4:15; USC 41–14)
- (11:33) USC – Aca'Cedric Ware 21-yard run, Matt Boermeester kick (Drive: 4 plays, 65 yards, 1:40; USC 48–14)

Statistics	USC	ARIZ
First downs	25	20
Total yards	574	343
Rushing yards	43–320	44–201
Passing yards	254	142
Passing: Comp–Att–Int	22–35–0	11–26–2
Time of possession	35:24	24:36

Team	Category	Player	Statistics
USC	Passing	Sam Darnold	20/32, 235 yards, 5 TD
USC	Rushing	Aca'Cedric Ware	12 carries, 103 yards, TD
USC	Receiving	JuJu Smith-Schuster	9 receptions, 132 yards, 3 TD
Arizona	Passing	Matt Morin	4/8, 84 yards, TD, INT
Arizona	Rushing	Khalil Tate	14 carries, 72 yards, TD
Arizona	Receiving	Cam Denson	1 reception, 51 yards

=== vs Stanford ===
Stanford Cardinal (4–3) vs Arizona Wildcats (2–5) – Game summary

Quarter	1	2	3	4	Total
Cardinal	0	17	10	7	34
Wildcats	0	7	3	0	10

at Arizona Stadium • Tucson, AZ

- Date: October 29, 2016
- Game time: 8:00 p.m.
- Game weather: Clear, 83 °F (28 °C)
- Game attendance: 46,740
- Referee: Land Clark
- TV: FS1

Game information

First quarter

No scoring plays

Second quarter

- (14:21) STAN – Christian McCaffrey 45-yard run, Conrad Ukropina kick (Drive: 1 play, 45 yards, 0:09; Stanford 7–0)
- (8:39) STAN – Christian McCaffrey 18-yard pass from Keller Chryst, Conrad Ukropina kick (Drive: 6 plays, 65 yards, 2:52; Stanford 14–0)
- (3:40) ARIZ – Trey Griffey 38-yard pass from Brandon Dawkins, Josh Pollack kick (Drive: 11 plays, 75 yards, 4:59; Stanford 14–7)
- (0:20) STAN – Conrad Ukropina 45-yard field goal (Drive: 10 plays, 21 yards, 1:20; Stanford 17–7)

Third quarter

- (6:05) STAN – Conrad Ukropina 26-yard field goal (Drive: 7 plays, 33 yards, 4:02; Stanford 20–7)
- (4:36) STAN – Christian McCaffrey 6-yard run, Conrad Ukropina kick (Drive: 3 plays, 23 yards, 1:15; Stanford 27–7)
- (1:28) ARIZ – Josh Pollack 27-yard field goal (Drive: 8 plays, 65 yards, 3:03; Stanford 27–10)

Fourth quarter

- (3:10) STAN – J. J. Arcega-Whiteside 5-yard pass from Keller Chryst, Conrad Ukropina kick (Drive: 6 plays, 39 yards, 3:08; Stanford 34–10)

Statistics	STAN	ARIZ
First downs	17	15
Total yards	341	286
Rushing yards	42–237	44–170
Passing yards	104	116
Passing: Comp–Att–Int	14–31–1	5–20–1
Time of possession	33:52	26:08

Team	Category	Player	Statistics
Stanford	Passing	Keller Chryst	14/30, 104 yards, 2 TD, INT
Stanford	Rushing	Christian McCaffrey	23 carries, 169 yards, 2 TD
Stanford	Receiving	Trenton Irwin	5 receptions, 34 yards
Arizona	Passing	Brandon Dawkins	5/15, 116 yards, TD, INT
Arizona	Rushing	Brandon Dawkins	17 carries, 65 yards
Arizona	Receiving	Trey Griffey	2 receptions, 55 yards, TD

=== at No. 25 Washington State ===
Arizona Wildcats (2–6) at No. 25 Washington State Cougars (6–2) – Game summary

Quarter	1	2	3	4	Total
Wildcats	0	7	0	0	7
Cougars	24	14	14	17	69

at Martin Stadium • Pullman, WA

- Date: November 5, 2016
- Game time: 1:00 p.m.
- Game weather: Clear and Sunny, 61 °F (16 °C)
- Game attendance: 33,547
- Referee: Steve Strimling
- TV: Pac-12 Network

Game information

First quarter

- (10:12) WSU – Erik Powell 23-yard field goal (Drive: 7 plays, 18 yards, 2:42; Washington State 3–0)
- (9:37) WSU – James Williams 8-yard pass from Luke Falk, Erik Powell kick (Drive: 1 play, 8 yards, 0:06; Washington State 10–0)
- (4:25) WSU – Gerard Wicks 1-yard run, Erik Powell kick (Drive: 8 plays, 85 yards, 3:06; Washington State 17–0)
- (0:19) WSU – Gabe Marks 2-yard pass from Luke Falk, Erik Powell kick (Drive: 6 plays, 47 yards, 1:35; Washington State 24–0)

Second quarter

- (9:19) WSU – Tavares Martin Jr. 7-yard pass from Luke Falk, Erik Powell kick (Drive: 7 plays, 93 yards, 3:03; Washington State 31–0)
- (2:30) WSU – Gerard Wicks 1-yard run, Erik Powell kick (Drive: 8 plays, 46 yards, 3:54; Washington State 38–0)
- (1:55) ARIZ – Cam Denson 47-yard pass from Anu Solomon, Josh Pollack kick (Drive: 2 plays, 75 yards, 0:35; Washington State 38–7)

Third quarter

- (9:16) WSU – James Williams 4-yard run, Erik Powell kick (Drive: 12 plays, 75 yards, 5:44; Washington State 45–7)
- (3:45) WSU – Tavares Martin Jr. 4-yard pass from Luke Falk, Erik Powell kick (Drive: 8 plays, 55 yards, 2:59; Washington State 52–7)

Fourth quarter

- (12:41) WSU – Erik Powell 31-yard field goal (Drive: 10 plays, 53 yards, 3:46; Washington State 55–7)
- (10:27) WSU – River Cracraft 71-yard pass from Tyler Hilinski, Erik Powell kick (Drive: 2 plays, 84 yards, 1:00; Washington State 62–7)
- (2:19) WSU – Isaiah Johnson-Mack 9-yard pass from Tyler Hilinski, Erik Powell kick (Drive: 11 plays, 77 yards, 6:54; Washington State 69–7)

Statistics	ARIZ	WSU
First downs	14	34
Total yards	286	614
Rushing yards	30–158	32–140
Passing yards	128	474
Passing: Comp–Att–Int	11–23–2	47–52–0
Time of possession	22:32	37:28

Team	Category	Player	Statistics
Arizona	Passing	Anu Solomon	9/13, 122 yards, TD
Arizona	Rushing	Samajie Grant	8 carries, 77 yards
Arizona	Receiving	Cam Denson	4 receptions, 77 yards, TD
Washington State	Passing	Luke Falk	32/35, 311 yards, 4 TD
Washington State	Rushing	James Williams	12 carries, 72 yards, TD
Washington State	Receiving	River Cracraft	2 receptions, 90 yards, TD

=== vs No. 16 Colorado ===
No. 16 Colorado Buffaloes (7–2) vs Arizona Wildcats (2–7) – Game summary

Quarter	1	2	3	4	Total
#16 Buffaloes	7	21	14	7	49
Wildcats	0	10	0	14	24

at Arizona Stadium • Tucson, AZ

- Date: November 12, 2016
- Game time: 8:00 p.m.
- Game weather: Clear, 69 °F (21 °C)
- Game attendance: 41,068
- Referee: Michael Batlan
- TV: FS1

Game information

First quarter

- (7:27) COLO – Phillip Lindsay 1-yard run, Davis Price kick (Drive: 16 plays, 81 yards, 5:17; Colorado 7–0)

Second quarter

- (12:28) ARIZ – Samajie Grant 3-yard run, Josh Pollack kick (Drive: 8 plays, 85 yards, 2:25; Tied 7–7)
- (11:29) COLO – Phillip Lindsay 4-yard run, Davis Price kick (Drive: 4 plays, 63 yards, 0:53; Colorado 14–7)
- (8:22) ARIZ – Josh Pollack 23-yard field goal (Drive: 8 plays, 69 yards, 3:01; Colorado 14–10)
- (5:45) COLO – Shay Fields 15-yard pass from Sefo Liufau, Davis Price kick (Drive: 7 plays, 62 yards, 2:31; Colorado 21–10)
- (1:29) COLO – Jay MacInyre 40-yard pass from Sefo Liufau, Davis Price kick (Drive: 4 plays, 53 yards, 0:58; Colorado 28–10)

Third quarter

- (5:01) COLO – Shay Fields 27-yard pass from Sefo Liufau, Davis Price kick (Drive: 7 plays, 73 yards, 2:36; Colorado 35–10)
- (0:57) COLO – Sefo Liufau 2-yard run, Davis Price kick (Drive: 7 plays, 52 yards, 3:30; Colorado 42–10)

Fourth quarter

- (13:47) ARIZ – Samajie Grant 3-yard run, Josh Pollack kick (Drive: 7 plays, 75 yards, 2:10; Colorado 42–17)
- (12:11) ARIZ – Zach Green 2-yard run, Josh Pollack kick (Drive: 3 plays, 33 yards, 0:50; Colorado 42–24)
- (3:34) COLO – Phillip Lindsay 34-yard run, Davis Price kick (Drive: 4 plays, 54 yards, 2:16; Colorado 49–24)

Statistics	COLO	ARIZ
First downs	25	23
Total yards	388	412
Rushing yards	46–175	52–257
Passing yards	213	155
Passing: Comp–Att–Int	19–27–1	12–26–0
Time of possession	30:13	29:47

Team	Category	Player	Statistics
Colorado	Passing	Sefo Liufau	19/27, 213 yards, 3 TD, INT
Colorado	Rushing	Phillip Lindsay	25 carries, 119 yards, 3 TD
Colorado	Receiving	Shay Fields	6 receptions, 108 yards, 2 TD
Arizona	Passing	Brandon Dawkins	9/19, 107 yards
Arizona	Rushing	Samajie Grant	16 carries, 113 yards, 2 TD
Arizona	Receiving	Shun Brown	2 receptions, 58 yards

=== at Oregon State ===
Arizona Wildcats (2–8) at Oregon State Beavers (2–8) – Game summary

Quarter	1	2	3	4	Total
Wildcats	0	10	0	7	17
Beavers	14	7	14	7	42

at Reser Stadium • Corvallis, OR

- Date: November 19, 2016
- Game time: 8:30 p.m.
- Game weather: Cloudy, 55 °F (13 °C)
- Game attendance: 35,059
- Referee: Mark Duddy
- TV: Pac-12 Network

Game information

First quarter

- (12:47) OSU – Jordan Villamin 53-yard pass from Marcus McMaryion, Garrett Owens kick (Drive: 4 plays, 53 yards, 2:13; Oregon State 7–0)
- (1:33) OSU – Ryan Nall 11-yard pass from Marcus McMaryion, Garrett Owens kick (Drive: 12 plays, 74 yards, 6:44; Oregon State 14–0)

Second quarter

- (9:45) ARIZ – Nate Phillips 10-yard pass from Brandon Dawkins, Josh Pollack kick (Drive: 7 plays, 39 yards, 2:37; Oregon State 14–7)
- (4:14) OSU – Timmy Hernandez 27-yard pass from Marcus McMaryion, Garrett Owens kick (Drive: 9 plays, 96 yards, 5:26; Oregon State 21–7)
- (0:00) ARIZ – Josh Pollack 22-yard field goal (Drive: 15 plays, 74 yards, 4:08; Oregon State 21–10)

Third quarter

- (11:32) OSU – Trevon Bradford 35-yard pass from Marcus McMaryion, Garrett Owens kick (Drive: 4 plays, 45 yards, 2:09; Oregon State 28–10)
- (5:16) OSU – Ryan Nall 3-yard run, Garrett Owens kick (Drive: 10 plays, 73 yards, 4:43; Oregon State 35–10)

Fourth quarter

- (8:00) ARIZ – Samajie Grant 2-yard run, Josh Pollack kick (Drive: 9 plays, 83 yards, 2:48; Oregon State 35–17)
- (1:30) OSU – Artavis Pierce 10-yard pass from Marcus McMaryion, Garrett Owens kick (Drive: 12 plays, 65 yards, 6:30; Oregon State 42–17)

Statistics	ARIZ	OSU
First downs	23	26
Total yards	350	475
Rushing yards	40–162	46–210
Passing yards	188	265
Passing: Comp–Att–Int	16–31–1	16–19–0
Time of possession	24:24	35:36

Team	Category	Player	Statistics
Arizona	Passing	Brandon Dawkins	10/17, 106 yards, TD, INT
Arizona	Rushing	Brandon Dawkins	15 carries, 88 yards
Arizona	Receiving	Nate Phillips	6 receptions, 58 yards, TD
Oregon State	Passing	Marcus McMaryion	16/19, 265 yards, 5 TD
Oregon State	Rushing	Ryan Nall	23 carries, 124 yards, TD
Oregon State	Receiving	Jordan Villamin	6 receptions, 124 yards, TD

=== vs Arizona State ===
Arizona State Sun Devils (5–6) vs Arizona Wildcats (2–9) – Game summary

Quarter	1	2	3	4	Total
Sun Devils	7	7	14	7	35
Wildcats	7	21	14	14	56

at Arizona Stadium • Tucson, AZ

- Date: November 25, 2016
- Game time: 7:30 p.m.
- Game weather: Clear, 65 °F (18 °C)
- Game attendance: 50,197
- Referee: Terry Leyden
- TV: ESPN

Game information

First quarter

- (13:48) ARIZ – Brandon Dawkins 71-yard run, Josh Pollack kick (Drive: 3 plays, 75 yards, 1:12; Arizona 7–0)
- (7:49) ASU – Koron Crump 42-yard fumble return, Zane Gonzalez kick (Tied 7–7)

Second quarter

- (14:18) ARIZ – Brandon Dawkins 10-yard run, Josh Pollack kick (Drive: 6 plays, 67 yards, 1:56; Arizona 14–7)
- (10:08) ARIZ – Nate Phillips 64-yard pass from Brandon Dawkins, Josh Pollack kick (Drive: 2 plays, 63 yards, 0:40; Arizona 21–7)
- (7:07) ARIZ – Zach Green 1-yard run, Josh Pollack kick (Drive: 5 plays, 23 yards, 1:33; Arizona 28–7)
- (0:34) ASU – Tim White 21-yard pass from Manny Wilkins, Zane Gonzalez kick (Drive: 13 plays, 94 yards, 4:20; Arizona 28–14)

Third quarter

- (11:14) ASU – Kalen Ballage 2-yard run, Zane Gonzalez kick (Drive: 9 plays, 65 yards, 3:38; Arizona 28–21)
- (9:52) ARIZ – Samajie Grant 9-yard run, Josh Pollack kick (Drive: 3 plays, 75 yards, 1:22; Arizona 35–21)
- (7:29) ASU – N'Keal Harry 16-yard pass from Manny Wilkins, Zane Gonzalez kick (Drive: 8 plays, 79 yards, 2:17; Arizona 35–28)
- (5:41) ARIZ – Zach Green 1-yard run, Josh Pollack kick (Drive: 4 plays, 83 yards, 1:34; Arizona 42–28)

Fourth quarter

- (11:45) ARIZ – Samajie Grant 2-yard run, Josh Pollack kick (Drive: 3 plays, 70 yards, 1:29; Arizona 49–28)
- (8:29) ASU – Fred Gammage 7-yard pass from Manny Wilkins, Zane Gonzalez kick (Drive: 9 plays, 76 yards, 3:09; Arizona 49–35)
- (7:45) ARIZ – Samajie Grant 63-yard run, Josh Pollack kick (Drive: 2 plays, 73 yards, 0:39; Arizona 56–35)

Statistics	ASU	ARIZ
First downs	31	19
Total yards	492	588
Rushing yards	38–120	48–511
Passing yards	372	77
Passing: Comp–Att–Int	43–60–1	3–8–0
Time of possession	35:56	24:04

Team	Category	Player	Statistics
Arizona State	Passing	Manny Wilkins	43/58, 372 yards, 3 TD, INT
Arizona State	Rushing	Manny Wilkins	23 carries, 79 yards
Arizona State	Receiving	Fred Gammage	12 receptions, 116 yards, TD
Arizona	Passing	Brandon Dawkins	3/8, 77 yards, TD
Arizona	Rushing	Brandon Dawkins	12 carries, 183 yards, 2 TD
Arizona	Receiving	Nate Phillips	2 receptions, 68 yards, TD

=== Attendance ===
Season	Games	Sellouts	W–L–T (%)	Attendance	Average	Best
2016	7	1	2–1–0 (.667)	65,000	–	–

== Statistics ==
=== Team ===
Team Statistics
	Arizona	Opponents
Points	47	39
First downs	38	52
3rd down	10–28	16–30
4th down	1–4	1–1
Rushing	337	273
Passing	436	604
Penalty	11–85	20–151
Rushing yards	337	273
Rushing attempts	73	96
Average per rush	4.4	4.5
Rushing TDs	2	1
Passing yards	213	202
Comp–att	35–59	51–74
Passing TDs	1	1
Touchdowns	3	2
Passing	1	1
Rushing	2	1
Defensive	0	0
Yards per game	7.1	7.0
Total offense	773	877
Total plays	76	56
Average per yards/game	5.9	5.5
Interceptions	0	2
Yards	0	1
Long	0	0
Touchdowns	0	0
Kick returns: # – Yards	2–42	3–65
TDs	0	0
Long	0	0
Punts	6	4
Yards	0	0
Average	47.5	45.7
Punt returns: # – Yards	1–27	1–6
TDs	0	0
Long	0	0
Turnovers	0	2
Fumbles – fumbles lost	1–0	1–0
Forced fumbles	1	0
Fumble recoveries	0	0
Fumble Recoveries – Yards	0	0
Opposing TD's	0	0
Tackles	66	48
Solo Tackles	58	44
Tackles for loss	7	8
TFL yards	−16	−39
Takeaways	0–0	0–2
Field goals	2–2	1–2
Sacks	4	1
Yards	−30	−5
Possession	37:23	22:23

=== Offense ===
Passing Statistics
#	NAME	POS	RAT	CMP	ATT	YDS	CMP%	TD	INT
12	Anu Solomon	QB	113.0	20	30	213	66.7	0	2
13	Brandon Dawkins	QB	136.3	50	81	625	61.7	3	1
14	Khalil Tate	QB	–	–	–	–	–	–	–
10	Zach Werlinger	QB	–	–	–	–	–	–	–
	TOTALS			70	111	838	0	3	3

Rushing Statistics
#	NAME	POS	CAR	YDS	LONG	TD
28	Nick Wilson	RB	43	257	49 (TDs)	3
13	Brandon Dawkins	QB	44	391	79 (TDs)	7
25	J. J. Taylor	RB	38	261	61 (TDs)	2
34	Zach Green	RB	15	54	12	–
2	Tyrell Johnson	WR	7	43	24 (TDs)	1
	TOTALS		147	1,006	225 (TDs)	13

Receiving Statistics
#	NAME	POS	REC	YDS	LONG	TD
6	Shun Brown	WR	13	213	56 (TDs)	1
11	Nate Phillips	WR	12	109	24	–
10	Samajie Grant	WR	11	130	70	–
5	Trey Griffey	WR	10	159	34 (TDs)	1
20	Shawn Poindexter	WR	6	82	25	–
2	Tyrell Johnson	WR	4	4	20	–
8	Trevor Wood	TE	3	24	12	–
17	Josh Kern	TE	3	16	7 (TDs)	1
3	Cam Denson	WR	2	19	11	–
23	J. J. Taylor	RB	2	18	18	–
28	Nick Wilson	RB	2	11	8	–
7	Devaughn Cooper	WR	1	15	15	–
34	Zach Green	RB	1	3	3	–
	TOTALS		70	803	303 (TDs)	3

=== Defense ===
Defensive Statistics
#	NAME	POS	SOLO	AST	TOT	TFL-YDS	SACKS	INT-YDS-TDS	BU	PD	QBH	FR–YDS	FF	BLK	SAF
1	Tellas Jones	S	0	0	0	0 – 0	0 – 0	0 – 0- 0	0	0	0	0 – 0	0	–	–
6	Demetrius Flannigan-Fowles	S	0	0	0	0 – 0	0 – 0	2 – 1- 0	0	0	0	0 – 0	0	–	–
9	Dane Cruikshank	CB	0	0	0	0 – 0	0 – 0	1 – 0- 0	0	0	0	0 – 0	0	–	–
11	Michael Barton	ILB	0	0	0	0 – 0	0 – 0	0 – 0- 0	0	0	0	0 – 0	0	–	–
13	Devin Holiday	CB	0	0	0	0 – 0	0 – 0	0 – 0- 0	0	0	0	0 – 0	0	–	–
14	Paul Magloire Jr.	SS	0	0	0	0 – 0	0 – 0	0 – 0- 0	0	0	0	0 – 0	0	–	–
17	Jace Whittaker	CB	0	0	0	0 – 0	0 – 0	1 – 22- 0	0	0	0	0 – 0	0	–	–
19	Davonte' Neal	CB	0	0	0	0 – 0	0 – 0	0 – 0- 0	0	0	0	0 – 0	0	–	–
20	Chacho Ulloa	S	0	0	0	0 – 0	0 – 0	0 – 0- 0	0	0	0	0 – 0	0	–	–
21	Isaiah Hayes	FS	0	0	0	0 – 0	0 – 0	0 – 0- 0	0	0	0	0 – 0	0	–	–
25	Anthony Mariscal	S	0	0	0	0 – 0	0 – 0	0 – 0- 0	0	0	0	0 – 0	0	–	–
29	Jarvis McCall Jr.	FS	0	0	0	0 – 0	0 – 0	1 – 6- 0	0	0	0	0 – 0	0	–	–
32	DeAndre' Miller	OLB	0	0	0	0 – 0	0 – 0	0 – 0- 0	0	0	0	0 – 0	0	–	–
47	Jake Matthews	SS	0	0	0	0 – 0	0 – 0	0 – 0- 0	0	0	0	0 – 0	0	–	–
56	John Kenny	OLB	0	0	0	0 – 0	0 – 0	0 – 0- 0	0	0	0	0 – 0	0	–	–
57	Cody Ippolito	ILB	0	0	0	0 – 0	0 – 0	0 – 0- 0	0	0	0	0 – 0	0	–	–
60	Luca Bruno	DT	0	0	0	0 – 0	0 – 0	0 – 0- 0	0	0	0	0 – 0	0	–	–
62	Aiulua Fanene	NT	0	0	0	0 – 0	0 – 0	0 – 0- 0	0	0	0	0 – 0	0	–	–
86	Justin Belknap	DE	0	0	0	0 – 0	0 – 0	0 – 0- 0	0	0	0	0 – 0	0	–	–
92	Jack Banda	DE	0	0	0	0 – 0	0 – 0	0 – 0- 0	0	0	0	0 – 0	0	–	–
93	Parker Zellers	NT	0	0	0	0 – 0	0 – 0	0 – 0- 0	0	0	0	0 – 0	0	–	–
99	Sani Fuimaono	DT	0	0	0	0 – 0	0 – 0	0 – 0- 0	0	0	0	0 – 0	0	–	–
	TOTAL		0	0	0	0 – 0	0 – 0	0 – 0- 0	0	0	0	0 – 0	0	–	–
	OPPONENTS		0	0	0	0–0	0–0	0 – 0 – 0	0	0	0	0–0	0	0	–

Key: POS: Position, SOLO: Solo Tackles, AST: Assisted Tackles, TOT: Total Tackles, TFL: Tackles-for-loss, SACK: Quarterback Sacks, INT: Interceptions, Yards: Yards, TDS: Touchdowns, BU: Passes Broken Up, PD: Passes Defended, QBH: Quarterback Hits, FF: Forced Fumbles, FR: Fumbles Recovered, BLK: Kicks or Punts Blocked, SAF: Safeties

=== Special teams ===
Kicking statistics
#	NAME	POS	XPM	XPA	XP%	FGM	FGA	FG%	0–19	20–29	30–39	40–49	50+	LNG	PTS
9	Josh Pollack	PK	14	14	100.0%	4	5	80.0%	0–0	2–2	1–1	1–1	0–1	46	
82	Edgar Gastelum	PK													
	TOTALS														

Kick return statistics
#	NAME	POS	RTNS	YDS	AVG	TD	LNG
2	Tyrell Johnson	KOR					
25	J. J. Taylor	KOR					
6	Shun Brown	KOR					
	TOTALS						

Punting statistics
#	NAME	POS	PUNTS	YDS	AVG	LONG	TB	FC	I–20	50+	BLK
9	Josh Pollack	P	15		48.1	65					
26	Matt Aragon	P									
	TOTALS										

Punt return statistics
#	NAME	POS	RTNS	YDS	AVG	TD	LONG
11	Nate Phillips	PR					
25	J. J. Taylor	PR					
	TOTALS						

==== Non-conference opponents ====
	1	2	3	4	Total
Arizona	20	17	34	23	94
All opponents	14	23	7	23	67

==== Pac-12 opponents ====
	1	2	3	4	OT	Total
Arizona	7	7	0	14	0	28
Pac-12 opponents	0	14	7	7	7	35

==== Score total by quarters ====
	1	2	3	4	OT	Total
Arizona	27	24	34	37	0	122
All opponents	14	37	14	30	7	102

== Awards and honors ==
=== Weekly awards ===
==== Week 1 ====
Nick Wilson

- Coaches Offensive Player of the Week (Week 1 vs BYU)

Jamie Nunley

- Scout Team Offensive Player of the Week (Week 1 vs BYU)

Matthew Stagg

- Scout Team Defensive Player of the Week (Week 1 vs BYU)

Dane Cruikshank

- Coaches Defensive Player of the Week (Week 1 vs BYU)

Issac Steele

- Scout Special Teams Player of the Week (Week 1 vs BYU)

Justin Belknap

- Hard Edge Player of the Week (Week 1 vs BYU)

Jalen Cochran

- Student Player of the Week (Week 1 vs BYU)

Zach Werlinger

- Community Service Award (Week 1 vs BYU)

==== Week 2 ====
Parker Zellers

- Hard Edge Player of the Week (Week 2 vs Grambling State)

Bryson Cain

- Scout Team Offensive Player of the Week (Week 2 vs. Grambling State)

Richard Merritt

- Co-Scout Team Defensive Player of the Week (Week 2 vs. Grambling State)

Lee Anderson III

- Co-Scout Team Defensive Player of the Week (Week 2 vs. Grambling State)

Richie Estrada

- Student Player of the Week (Week 2 vs. Grambling State)

Nick Reinhardt

- Scout Special Team Player of the Week (Week 2 vs. Grambling State)

==== Week 3 ====
Brandon Dawkins

- Co-Coaches Offensive Player of the Week (Week 3 vs Hawaii)

J. J. Taylor

- Co-Coaches Offensive Player of the Week (Week 3 vs Hawaii)

Demetrius Flannigan-Fowles

- Coaches Defensive Player of the Week (Week 3 vs Hawaii)

Josh Pollack

- Coaches Special Teams Player of the Week (Week 3 vs Hawaii)

Nate Phillips

- Hard Edge Player of the Week (Week 3 vs Hawaii)

Tyrell Johnson

- Student Player of the Week (Week 3 vs Hawaii)

Zach Benjamin

- Scout Offensive Player of the Week (Week 3 vs Hawaii)

Larry Tharpe Jr.

- Scout Defensive Player of the Week (Week 3 vs Hawaii)

Jarrius Wallace

- Scout Special Teams Player of the Week (Week 3 vs Hawaii)

Week 7

Week 8

Week 9

Week 10

Week 11

Week 12

Week 13

Week 14

- Bye

=== Award watch lists ===
Anu Solomon

- Maxwell Award Watch list – College Football Player of the Year
- Walter Camp Award Watchlist – Player of the Year
- Polynesian College Football Player of the Year Award Watchlist
- Davey O'Brien Award Watch list – the collegiate American football player judged to be the best of all NCAA quarterbacks

Nick Wilson

- Doak Walker Award Watch list – The nation's top college football running back

Paul Magloire Jr.

- Chuck Bednarik Award Watch List

== Postseason games ==
Senior Bowl

All Star Game

== Media affiliates ==
=== Radio ===
- ESPN Radio – (ESPN Tucson 1490 AM & 104.09 FM) – Nationwide (Dish Network, Sirius XM, TuneIn radio and iHeartRadio)
- KCUB 1290 AM – Football Radio Show – (Tucson, AZ)
- KHYT – 107.5 FM (Tucson, AZ)
- KTKT 990 AM – La Hora de Los Gatos (Spanish) – (Tucson, AZ)
- KGME 910 AM – (IMG Sports Network) – (Phoenix, AZ)
- KTAN 1420 AM – (Sierra Vista, AZ)
- KDAP 96.5 FM (Douglas, Arizona)
- KWRQ 102.3 FM – (Safford, AZ/Thatcher, AZ)
- KIKO 1340 AM – (Globe, AZ)
- KVWM 970 AM – (Show Low, AZ/Pinetop-Lakeside, AZ)
- XENY 760 – (Nogales, Sonora) (Spanish)

=== TV ===
- KOLD (CBS)
- KGUN (ESPN College Football on ABC/ABC)
- FOX (Fox Sports Media Group)
- FS1 (Fox Sports Media Group)
- ESPN (ESPN Family)
- ESPN2 (ESPN Family)
- ESPNU (ESPN Family)
- CBS Sports Network
- Pac-12 Network (Pac-12 Arizona)

== NFL draft ==
=== 2017 NFL draft ===
The 2017 NFL draft was held at the Philadelphia Museum of Art in Philadelphia on April 27 through April 29, 2017. The following Arizona players were either selected or signed as free agents following the draft.
