= George Kenneth Griffey =

George Kenneth Griffey may refer to:

- George Kenneth Griffey Sr. or Ken Griffey Sr. (born 1950), American former baseball player and coach
- George Kenneth Griffey Jr. or Ken Griffey Jr. (born 1969), American former baseball player inducted into the Baseball Hall of Fame
- George Kenneth Griffey III or Trey Griffey (born 1994), American football player
