= Murder of Arthur Warren =

2000 murder in West Virginia, United States

Arthur Warren
- Born: Arthur Carl Warren Jr. 1974; United States
- Died: July 4, 2000 (aged 26); Grant Town, West Virginia, United States
- Cause of death: Beating
- Other name: J.R. (nickname)
- Known for: Homicide victim

The murder of Arthur Warren was the killing of 26-year-old American Arthur Carl ("J.R.") Warren Jr. on July 4, 2000, by two male teens. According to Liz Seaton of the Human Rights Campaign, it had all the earmarks of a hate crime.

== Background ==
Arthur Carl ("J.R.") Warren Jr. (1974 - July 3, 2000) Warren was born in 1974 to parents Arthur Warren Sr. and Brenda Warren and resided in Grant Town, West Virginia. Warren lived with learning disabilities and a birth defect that caused him to be born with several fingers missing on one hand. He was widely regarded in his community as a "soft spoken" young man. At 16, he came out to his mother and the minister at his church, and found acceptance and support with both. After his death, his mother—Brenda Warren—addressed a hate crimes rally in Washington, D.C. and lobbied for the inclusion of sexual orientation in West Virginia's hate crimes law.

With his parents, Warren was a regular churchgoer, and attended the Missionary Baptist assembly—which split from the Southern Baptists over support for slavery. He also attended meetings of a gay student group at nearby Fairmont State College.

== Meeting ==
Warren left his parents' home around 11:30 p.m. on July 3, 2000, to watch the Fourth of July fireworks in Grant Town. His mother said she reminded him of his 12:30 a.m. curfew, and when he had not returned home by 2:30 a.m. she assumed he was spending the night at a friend's.

Instead of attending the fireworks, Warren went to meet with 17-year-old David Allen Parker, an acquaintance, at an empty house owned by Parker's family. Parker was painting the house, along with his 17-year-old cousin Jared Wilson and 15-year-old Jason Shoemaker. While there, the four drank beer, smoked marijuana, and huffed gasoline fumes, inhaling them in order to get high.

Parker reportedly asked Warren to bring cigarettes, condoms, porn, and Xanax, the latter of which Warren had been prescribed as an anti-anxiety medication. Warren reportedly brought both cigarettes and Xanax to the house, where the other three boys began to crush and snort the tablets.

== Murder ==
An argument ensued at the house when Parker accused Warren of spreading a rumor that the two had a sexual relationship. Warren denied doing so. The Associated Press reported that "sources close to the story" said that Parker and Warren had a sexual relationship and that Warren had also had a sexual relationship with Wilson. Marion County Prosecutor G. Richard Brunner later said the allegations of sexual activity were hearsay. The AP stood by its story. Parker's attorney would later claim that Parker had been sexually involved with Warren 30 times since he was 10 years old, and that Warren had given Parker drugs and alcohol before most of their encounters.

At some point during the argument, Parker and Wilson began beating Warren and kicking him with steel-toed boots. Shoemaker witnessed the beating but did not participate. Court documents record that Parker later said Shoemaker egged him on to confront Warren.

Afterwards, the three boys put a bloodied Warren in Parker's car. Parker drove and Shoemaker sat in the front seat while Jared sat in back with Warren. Warren was still conscious enough to repeatedly ask to be taken home.

Near the edge of town, Parker and Wilson removed Warren's body from the car and placed it in the road while Shoemaker remained in the car. Parker then ran over Warren with his car a total of four times, to disguise the death as a hit-and-run. The three boys then returned to the house where the assault had taken place, cleaned up the blood and disposed of their bloodied clothes by burning them with gasoline. Parker then huffed the fumes from the gasoline.

Warren's body was discovered by a newspaper carrier at 5:30 a.m., by the side of County Route 17 in Grant Town.

Murder of Arthur Warren
- Date: July 4, 2000
- Location: Grant Town, West Virginia, United States
- Convicted: David Allen Parker, Jared Wilson, Jason Shoemaker
- Charges: Parker - First degree Murder; Wilson - Second degree murder; Shoemaker - Accessory after the fact
- Verdict: Guilty

== Confession ==
Though threatened with death by Parker and Wilson if he revealed the murder, Shoemaker told his mother, Norma Shoemaker, about the murder. Norma Shoemaker called the police later that morning. Police had initially believed Warren was the victim of a hit-and-run accident, but switched to a homicide investigation upon receiving Norma Shoemaker's call.

Parker and Wilson were arrested while attending an Independence Day celebration with their families. They were reported to have confessed to Warren's murder. Because the suspects were minors, law enforcement officers were prohibited from discussing the content of their confessions.

Marion County Sheriff Ron Watkins said there was no evidence that Warren's murder was a hate crime, but that law enforcement official had not ruled out the possibility. Sheriff Watkins later met with the president of the Fairmont State College Gay, Lesbian, and Bisexual student group, of which Warren was a member even though he did not attend the college. The Human Rights Campaign joined students in advising law enforcement officials on the possibility that Warren's murder was a hate crime.

== Aftermath ==
Arthur Warren's funeral was held on July 8, 2000, at his family's church, and was attended by hundreds of mourners.

His parents, Brenda and Arthur Warren insisted that the coffin be open for viewing. "We want people to see what they did to my son," said Brenda Warren. The Warrens later told CNN during an interview that they hoped the suspects would be tried as adults and the murder treated as a hate crime.

Two vigils were held in Warren's honor on July 11, one by the West Virginia Lesbian and Gay Coalition at the West Virginia State Capitol and one in front of the Marion County courthouse by the Fairmont State College gay and lesbian student group.

The Marion County vigil was attended by more than 600 people, where local clergy spoke and were joined by members of the Warren family. A handful of protesters from the family of Fred Phelps, leader of the Westboro Baptist Church which the Southern Poverty Law Center labels a hate group, in Topeka, Kansas, also attended. Gay and lesbian students from West Virginia University carried white banners to block the view of the protesters.

== Hearings ==
On July 19, 2001, David Allen Parker pleaded guilty to first-degree murder and in July 2001 was sentenced to life in prison with mercy, which would make him eligible for parole in 15 years. In exchange for his plea, a second count of conspiracy to commit a felony was dismissed. Parker also agreed to testify against Wilson.

On August 21, 2001, Jared Wilson pleaded guilty to second-degree murder—reduced from first-degree murder and conspiracy to commit a felony, -- and received a 20-year prison sentence.

Shoemaker, was charged as an accessory after the fact, and tried as a juvenile for helping dispose of evidence after the murder.

In June 2002, Brenda and Arthur Warren filed a wrongful death lawsuit against his killers. Their family attorney, Paul Farrell, said that in defending themselves Parker and Wilson had portrayed Warren as a sexual predator and themselves as the victims, and that Mrs. Warren "didn't feel like she had the chance to tell her side of the story."
