= Rich Rodriguez =

American football player and coach (born 1963)

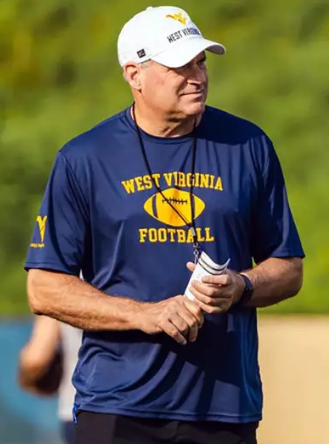
- Rodriguez with West Virginia

Current position
- Title: Head coach
- Team: West Virginia
- Conference: Big 12
- Record: 69–40

Biographical details
- Born: May 24, 1963 (age 63); Grant Town, West Virginia, U.S.

Playing career
- 1981–1984: West Virginia
- Position: Defensive back

Coaching career (HC unless noted)
- 1985: West Virginia (SA)
- 1986: Salem (DB/ST)
- 1987: Salem (AHC/DC)
- 1988: Salem
- 1989: West Virginia (OLB)
- 1990–1996: Glenville State
- 1997–1998: Tulane (OC/QB)
- 1999–2000: Clemson (OC/QB)
- 2001–2007: West Virginia
- 2008–2010: Michigan
- 2012–2017: Arizona
- 2019: Ole Miss (OC/QB)
- 2021: Louisiana–Monroe (AHC/OC/QB)
- 2022–2024: Jacksonville State
- 2025–present: West Virginia

Head coaching record
- Overall: 199–143–2
- Bowls: 6–6
- Tournaments: 2–2 (NAIA D-I playoffs)

Accomplishments and honors

Championships
- NCAA Division I: 4 Big East (2003–2005, 2007); ASUN (2022); C-USA (2024); Pac-12 South Division (2014); NAIA Division I 4 WVIAC (1993–1996)

Awards
- NCAA Division I: 2× Big East Coach of the Year (2003, 2005); 2× WVIAC Coach of the Year (1993, 1994); Pac-12 Coach of the Year (2014); C-USA Coach of the Year (2024); NAIA Division I NAIA Division I Coach of the Year (1993)

Richard Alan Rodriguez (/rɒd.ˈriː.ɡjɛz/; born May 24, 1963), also known as Rich Rod, is an American college football coach and former player. He is the current head football coach at West Virginia University, his second stint with his alma mater. Rodriguez previously was the head football coach at Salem University, Glenville State College, the University of Michigan, the University of Arizona, and Jacksonville State University. In 2011, Rodriguez worked as an analyst for CBS Sports.

== Playing career ==
A native of Grant Town, West Virginia, Rodriguez graduated from North Marion High School in 1981 where he played four sports and was an all-state football and basketball player. After high school, Rodriguez attended West Virginia University. Playing as a defensive back, he recorded 54 career tackles over three seasons.

== Coaching career ==
=== West Virginia and Salem ===
During the 1985 season, Rodriguez was a student assistant under head coach Don Nehlen and graduated with a physical education degree. In 1986, he was hired by Salem College (now Salem University) where he was special teams coordinator and secondary coach. In 1987, he became Salem’s defensive coordinator and in 1988 took over as head coach. At 25 years old, he was the youngest college head coach in the country. He was 2–8 in his first season as head coach, after which the college announced it was dropping its football program.

In 1989, he returned to West Virginia University as a volunteer assistant.

=== Glenville State, Tulane, and Clemson ===
After Rodriguez's return to WVU as a volunteer coach with the outside linebackers for the 1989 football season, he left again to take over as head coach at Glenville State College (now Glenville State University). During his stay from 1990 to 1996, the team earned three consecutive West Virginia Intercollegiate Athletic Conference (WVIAC) championships and competed in the 1993 NAIA national championship. His first season, 1990, he led the team to a 1–7 record. In 1991, Glenville improved to 4–5–1, then 6–4 season; in 1993, Rodriguez led Glenville to a 10–3 record and the WVIAC Championship and NAIA runner-up. The next two years, 1994 and 1995, Glenville finished as WVIAC Co-Champions. In Rodriguez's final season at Glenville, 1996, he led them to a Co-Championship once again. While at Glenville, Rodriguez compiled a record of 43–28–2 and was named WVIAC Coach of the Year in 1993 and 1994, NAIA National Coach of the Year in 1993, and West Virginia State College Coach of the Year in 1993 by the West Virginia Sports Writers Association. Glenville State's four championships under Rodriguez were their first since 1959 while his players' set five national career records for Division II.

Rodriguez left Glenville State at the end of the 1996 season to be assistant coach, offensive coordinator, and quarterback coach for Tulane University from 1997 to 1998, under head coach Tommy Bowden. Rodriguez knew Bowden's father, Bobby Bowden, because he had worked at his camps during summers. In Rodriguez's first year as offensive coordinator his innovative offense succeeded as Tulane went 7–4 and had their best season since 1980. Rodriguez was part of Tulane's success, including their 12–0 season in Rodriguez's last season at Tulane, mainly for his spread offense with quarterback Shaun King. When Bowden was hired as the head coach at Clemson University, he kept Rodriguez on his staff. Rodriguez was the offensive coordinator and associate head coach until the end of the 2000 season. Rodriguez was considered to be the frontrunner for the Tulane coaching job following Bowden's departure and was led to believe that he was going to be the next coach for Tulane. However, Chris Scelfo was hired instead.

In 1999, Rodriguez interviewed for the head coaching job at Texas Tech but lost to Mike Leach.

=== West Virginia ===
On November 26, 2000, WVU's athletic department announced that Rodriguez would again return to West Virginia, this time as head coach to replace the retiring Don Nehlen. Rodriguez's first season at West Virginia, 2001, was a disappointing 3–8. However, they improved greatly the next year, as they went 9–4 while finishing as a runner-up in the Big East Conference; this also included back-to-back road wins against ranked Virginia Tech and Pittsburgh, and a Continental Tire Bowl berth, where they lost to ACC runner-up in Virginia. The Mountaineers finished second in the nation rushing with 283 yards per game and fourth in turnover margin. In 2003, the Mountaineers started the season 1–4, and after losing to #2 Miami 22–20, the Mountaineers posted a 6–1 Big East record and tied for the Big East championship with Miami, earning a Gator Bowl berth. That season, the Mountaineers replaced 22 seniors, eleven of which were starters. In 2004, the Mountaineers posted an 8–4 record with a talented team of seniors and juniors, but were ranked as high as sixth during the regular season.

Following the 2002 season, Rodriguez was awarded the Big East Coach of the Year by Sporting News and state college coach of the year for all sports by the West Virginia Sports Writers Association. He also received the 2003 Frank Loria Award from the West Virginia chapter of the National Football Foundation, and also earned Big East Coach of the Year that season. In 2005, he was offered to join the AFCA Board of Directors, and that same season was again given Big East Coach of the Year honors. In 2005, Rodriguez and the Mountaineers won the Big East title with freshman tandem Steve Slaton and Patrick White, thus claiming the conference's automatic berth in the Bowl Championship Series (BCS), where they defeated the Georgia Bulldogs in the Nokia Sugar Bowl and a final Associated Press ranking of fifth, tying the highest in school history (other in 1988).

==== 2006 ====
Repeating their 2005 success, West Virginia posted another 11-win season, the first consecutive 10-win seasons in school history. The Mountaineers defeated Georgia Tech, 38–35, in the 2007 Gator Bowl and finished 10th in the final polls.

On December 7, 2006, Rodriguez received an offer to be the next Alabama Crimson Tide head coach. Despite reports that he had agreed in principle to coach at Alabama, which Rodriguez described as totally incorrect, on December 8, 2006, Rodriguez announced he would remain as head coach at West Virginia.

==== 2007 ====
The Mountaineers started the 2007 season ranked #3 in the AP Poll and #6 in the Coaches' Poll. They were #5 in the nation, before losing to #18 South Florida for the second consecutive time. South Florida eventually moved to #2, before dropping out of the Top 25 after losses (though USF would end the regular season ranked at #21). West Virginia dropped to #12 and #13 in the AP and Coaches' poll, respectively, before rebounding with wins against Syracuse, Mississippi State, #25 Rutgers, Louisville, and #21 Cincinnati. The Mountaineers eventually defeated #20 Connecticut to clinch the Big East Championship and move to #2 in the BCS standings and #1 in the Coaches' poll, both the highest position ever for a Mountaineer football team. WVU's regular season ended at home with a loss in the Backyard Brawl against Pittsburgh, 13-9. After the departure of Rodriguez, the Mountaineers went on to defeat Oklahoma in the Fiesta Bowl under interim head coach Bill Stewart.

==== Departure from West Virginia ====
On December 16, 2007, Rodriguez informed players at West Virginia that he was leaving to succeed retired Lloyd Carr as University of Michigan head coach. Rodriguez's loss earlier that month to the unranked Pittsburgh Panthers eliminated WVU from national championship contention. Rodriguez's original resignation letter listed January 3, 2008, as his resignation date, but he subsequently made it clear that he would not be coaching WVU in its January 2 appearance in the 2008 Fiesta Bowl versus Oklahoma. On December 18, 2007, Rodriguez informed the university that his resignation would instead be effective at midnight that night and was replaced by his former assistant coach Bill Stewart, who was selected as head coach after the Mountaineers won the Fiesta Bowl.

The announcement of his departure came just four months after Rodriguez last renegotiated his contract with West Virginia and was made despite his stated long-term commitment to the Mountaineers. The contract included a $4 million buyout if he left WVU within one year of the August 2007 signing date. It has since been speculated that Rodriguez's departure was triggered by conflicts with the new president of WVU, Michael Garrison. Some insight into the discontent between Rodriguez and WVU is evidenced in a compendium of emails that were released to the Associated Press on January 23, 2008. An Associated Press story indicated that Rodriguez's agent Mike Brown was threatening to take his client elsewhere early in the 2007 season.

On December 27, 2007, West Virginia University filed a motion for declaratory judgment in Monongalia County Circuit Court, asking the court to find that Rodriguez's contract with the university was valid, that WVU had not breached that contract, and that Rodriguez had breached it. Subsequently, on January 18, 2008, WVU added a count of breach of contract after Rodriguez allegedly failed to pay the first installment of the $4 million liquidated damages clause (often referred to as a "buyout clause" by the media) when due.

On July 9, 2008, Rodriguez and WVU agreed to settle the lawsuit. The terms of the settlement stated that the University of Michigan would pay $2.5 million of the settlement. Rodriguez was required to pay WVU the remaining $1.5 million in three installments of $500,000 each, spread over three years starting in January 2010.

An opinion poll in September 2013 by Public Policy Polling found that 47% of West Virginia voters still had an unfavorable opinion of him, with only 11% seeing him favorably.

=== Michigan ===
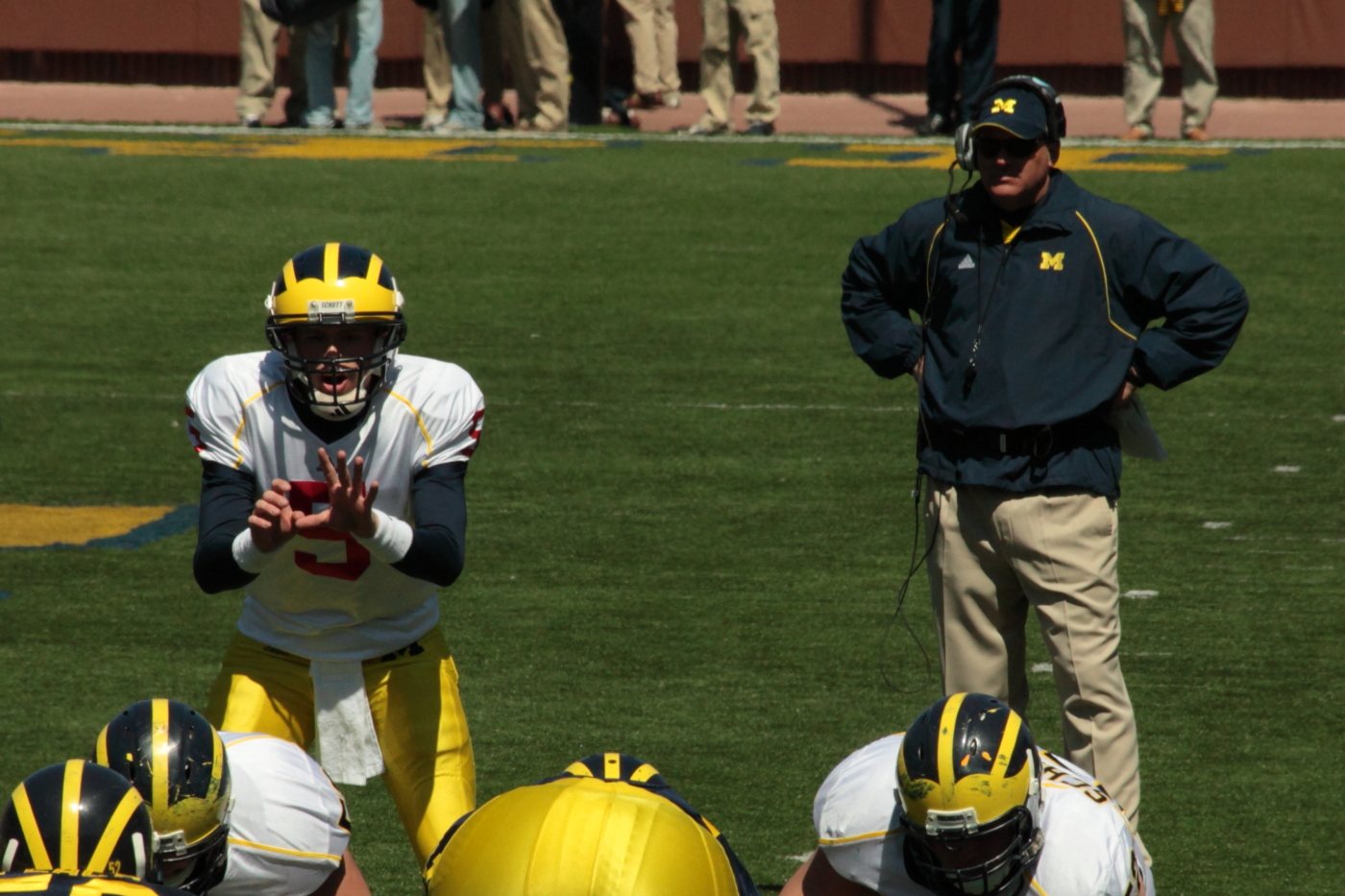
Rodriguez & Tate Forcier during spring practice on April 11, 2009.

Rodriguez was introduced by Michigan as its new coach at a news conference held on December 17, 2007, at the Junge Family Champions Center on the University of Michigan campus. After arriving at Michigan, Rodriguez installed a new staff. He brought several members of his West Virginia staff with him, including Tony Gibson and offensive coordinator Calvin Magee. Fred Jackson, the running backs coach, was the only coaching holdover from Lloyd Carr's staff. Rodriguez also changed the strength and conditioning facilities, completed a top ten incoming recruiting class in 2008 (which was recruited mainly by Carr and his staff), and installed his own recruiting to serve his spread offense. Equipment manager Jon Falk also stayed with the Michigan football program; he had been with Michigan since the days of Bo Schembechler.

Rodriguez began his Michigan coaching career on August 30, 2008, with a 25–23 loss to Utah. His 2008 team finished with a record of 3–9, the worst season in school history. Michigan's losing record meant that the team did not play in a post-season bowl game for the first time in 33 years, the longest such streak in college football up to that point. One of the few high points of the season came on September 27 when Michigan made the second-largest comeback in program history to defeat #9 Wisconsin 27–25 after trailing 19–0 late in the third quarter. That contest was also the 500th game played in Michigan Stadium.

==== Players leaving and criticism ====
Several Michigan players transferred and subsequently criticized Rodriguez. Justin Boren transferred from the program to rival Ohio State citing offensive behavior and a "lack of family values" from the coaching staff. Boren became first team all Big Ten at Ohio State University in the 2009 season. Others have supported the assertion about a lack of family values, including Detroit Free Press writer Michael Rosenberg, who stated "Rodriguez's staff uses some of the foulest, most degrading language imaginable. I know coaches curse, and I'm no prude, but this goes way beyond a few dirty words. This is a big part of why offensive lineman Justin Boren left the team. He felt his dignity was at stake." Former Michigan player Kurt Wermers claimed to not get along with coaches after transferring following the 2008 season to Ball State University, but he was, in fact, academically ineligible at the time of his transfer, calling into question the credibility of his claim.

==== NCAA rule violations ====
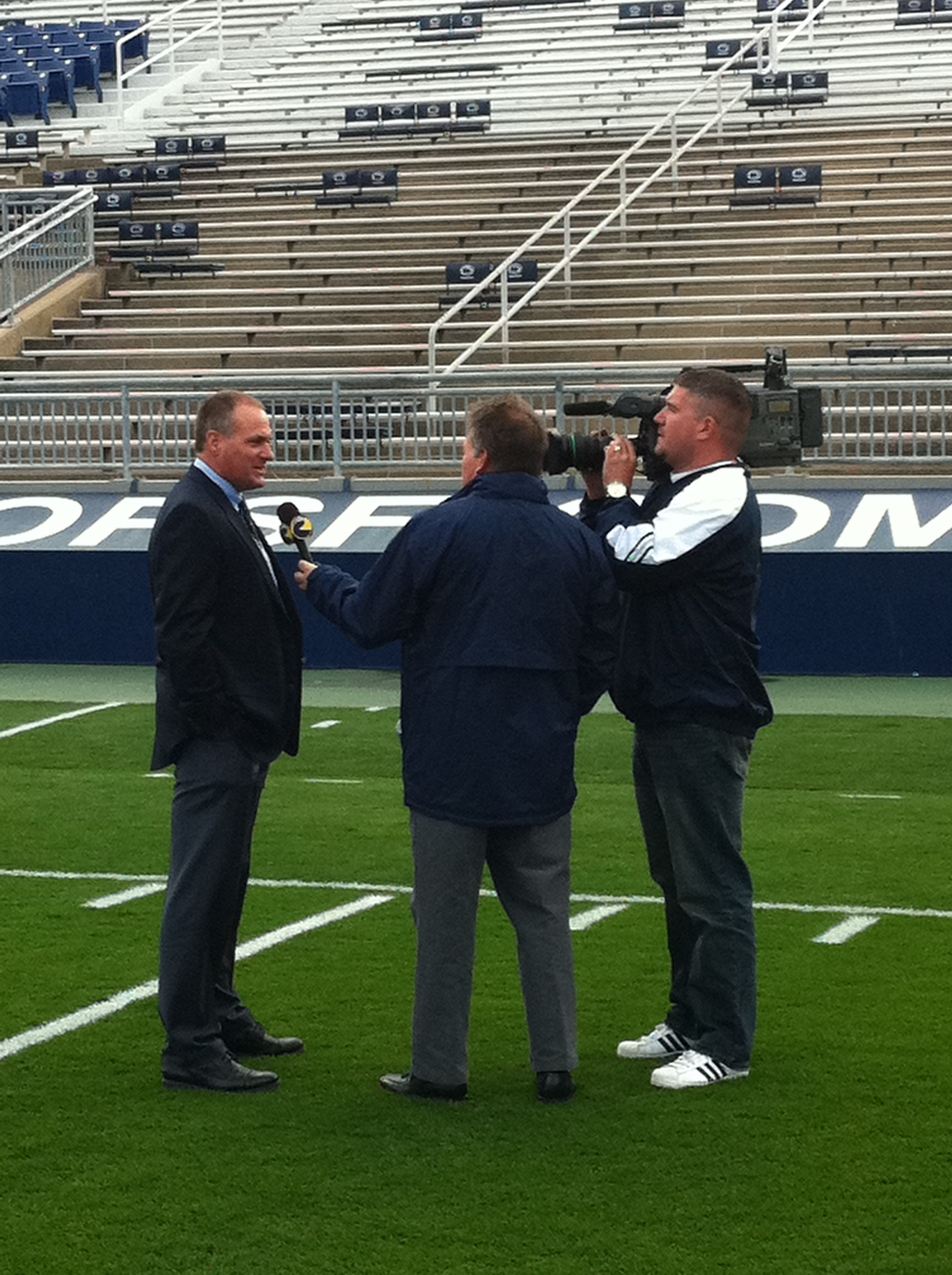
Rich Rodriguez gives an interview in Beaver Stadium before the day of the 2010 Michigan vs. Penn State game

Prior to the 2009 season several anonymous players told journalists (including Rosenberg) at the Detroit Free Press that Rodriguez and his coaching staff had habitually violated NCAA rules. The alleged offenses included attending unofficial scrimmages and requiring players to work out more hours than NCAA rules permit for the off-season. Rodriguez denied the allegations. On October 27, 2009, the NCAA sent a Notice of Inquiry to the University of Michigan stating the NCAA found reasonably reliable information indicating NCAA rule violations. Following the Notice, the investigation into potential major violations continued. On November 16, 2009, the University of Michigan Auditors looking into the NCAA violations discovered that University of Michigan Athletic Department staff failed to file monthly logs that track how much players work out and practice.

Then on February 22, 2010, the NCAA formally accused Michigan of five "major rules violations" after finding that the team and its coaching staff failed to comply with practice time rules under coach Rich Rodriguez, and used several graduate assistants in coaching position in contravention of NCAA regulations on the limits of the number of coaches. This marked the first time that major violations have been alleged against the Michigan football program. All of the violations dated from January 2008 forward, which coincided with Rodriguez's arrival at Michigan. The University of Michigan has acknowledged that it committed four major violations in its football program. This resulted in U-M self-imposing sanctions which including cutting practice time and either disciplining or terminating staff, as well as two years probation. The final NCAA report downgraded the list of violations originally investigated, agreed with Michigan's self-imposed sanctions, but added an extra year of probation.

==== Eventual departure ====
Despite the setbacks of his inaugural season, Rodriguez compiled a recruiting class for the 2009 season which was ranked eighth nationally by Rivals.com. Tom Dienhart, writing for Sports Illustrated, named Rodriguez the second best football coach in the Big Ten Conference behind only Iowa's Kirk Ferentz and ahead of more tenured coaches such as Penn State's Joe Paterno and Ohio State's Jim Tressel.

Under Rodriguez, the Wolverines opened the 2009 season with a 31–7 win against Western Michigan followed by wins over rival Notre Dame and Eastern Michigan. Following these three victories, two over weak mid-major opponents, Michigan opened its Big Ten schedule with a 36–33 win against Indiana. However, Michigan finished the season with a 5–7 (1–7 in the Big Ten) record after road losses to Michigan State, and the Iowa Hawkeyes and a 25-point home loss to Penn State followed by a 25-point loss to the University of Illinois and a 38–36 loss at home to Purdue. Rodriguez ended the 2009 season with a 21–10 loss to rival Ohio State. This loss eliminated the Wolverines from bowl competition for the second year in a row.

The 2010 season got off to a similar start to the 2009 campaign, with the Wolverines winning their first five games of the season. Michigan started the season off by notching a win over Connecticut, who eventually won a share of the Big East title and went on to represent the conference in a BCS bowl. By week three, the team earned a spot in the AP Top 25 at #20 and USA Today Poll at #22. Their highest AP ranking, #18, came before recording their first loss of the season against 17-ranked in-state foe and eventual Big Ten co-champion Michigan State (part of a three-way tie). The team finished Big Ten play with a 3–5 record, including a 37–7 loss against arch-rival Ohio State. This caused further criticism of Rodriguez, for failing to restore competitiveness to one of college football's greatest rivalries. Still, Michigan had earned a 7–5 record and, for the first time under Rodriguez, were bowl eligible.

The season included such highlights as a spectacular 67–65 comeback win over Illinois in triple overtime on November 6 and a special talent in sophomore quarterback Denard Robinson who in 12 games passed for 2,316 yards and rushed for 1,643 yards while accounting for 30 rushing and passing touchdowns. Rodriguez led Michigan to its first New Year's Day bowl since the 2007 season when Michigan accepted a bid to play in the Gator Bowl. However, Michigan's 38-point loss to Mississippi State in the Gator Bowl was the worst bowl loss in school history.

Due to the team's disappointing season after such a promising start, and another loss to Ohio State, Rodriguez finished the regular season campaign amidst speculation that he would not return for the 2011 season. Rumors about Rodriguez's ousting heated up after the season, when Stanford Cardinal head coach and former Michigan quarterback Jim Harbaugh did not attend an anniversary dinner recognizing the 1985 Michigan team. Harbaugh had been rumored to replace Rodriguez in seasons past.

At Michigan, Rodriguez suffered a 20-point home loss to a Big Ten opponent in all three seasons he coached (most recently against Wisconsin, a 48–28 loss). In his first two years, Rodriguez had no wins in October against Football Bowl Subdivision teams and did not record a win against such an opponent until the 2010 season, recording a road victory over Indiana. At Michigan, Rodriguez had a 2–7 record against the Wolverines' three regular season rivals: Ohio State, Notre Dame, and Michigan State, recording victories against Notre Dame in the 2009 and 2010 campaigns.

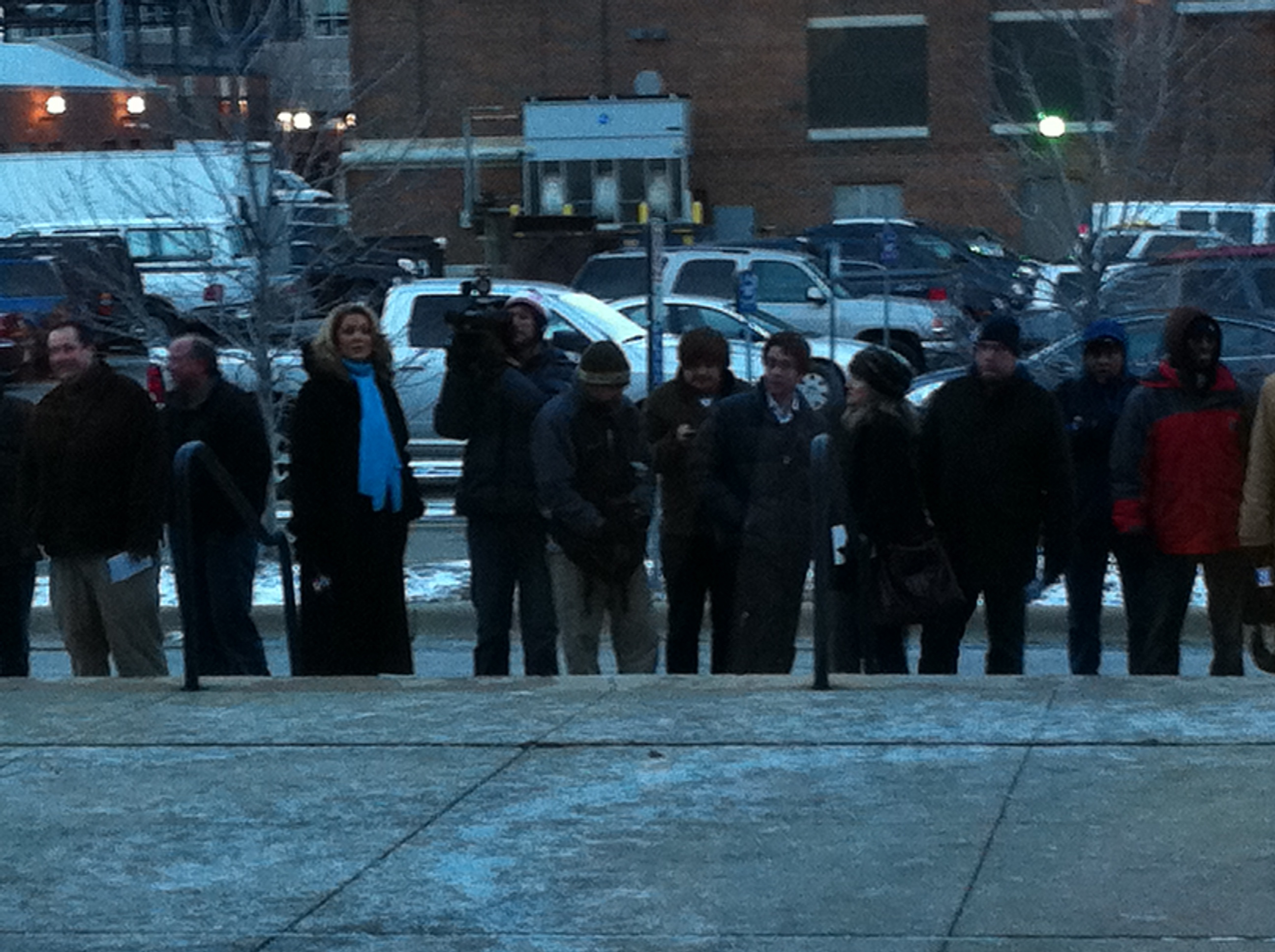
Media circus outside of Schembechler Hall after news broke that Rich Rodriguez had been fired as University of Michigan head coach on Jan 5, 2011

Rodriguez was rumored to be let go as Michigan coach on January 4, 2011. School officials initially denied this, but the following day, athletic director Dave Brandon announced that Rodriguez had been dismissed. Rodriguez has the lowest winning percentage (.405) of any coach in Michigan football's history. He also went 0–3 against Ohio State (outscored 100–24) and 0–3 against Michigan State. He oversaw the end of the longest active bowl streak in the NCAA. Recruiting also took a significant downturn during the Rodriguez era which would have an impact for the years following his tenure at Michigan.

Rodriguez worked as an analyst for CBS Sports for most of the 2011 season before being hired to coach at Arizona. He had previously participated in CBS's 2011 Signing Day Coverage. When asked if he regretted moving to Michigan, he said: "I think it's easy to go back now and say, 'Gee, [I] made a mistake.' And you can say that now because of hindsight. But at the time, some of the things I was looking to do and the opportunity that was there, you kind of make the move....but you know hindsight is always easier to look back and say, 'it was a mistake.' Because we did have a good thing going at West Virginia, and we really enjoyed it. As you look back at it, [it] wasn't the best move. Easy to say now." When asked if he would ever return to coaching, Rodriguez said, "I'm open to another opportunity, but we'll see. Here, that window looks like it's closed, but if something comes open after this season, and it seems like it may be a good opportunity for me and someone is interested, I'm sure I'll look into it."

In June 2011, Rodriguez put the family home in York Township, Michigan up for sale for an asking price of $1.9 million.

The tumultuous three years with Michigan was chronicled in great detail in Three and Out, written by John U. Bacon. Bacon was given full insider access from the start of the 2008 season all the way through the search for Rodriguez's successor. The book also covers Rich Rodriguez's career before coming to Michigan, including the buyout from West Virginia.

=== Arizona ===
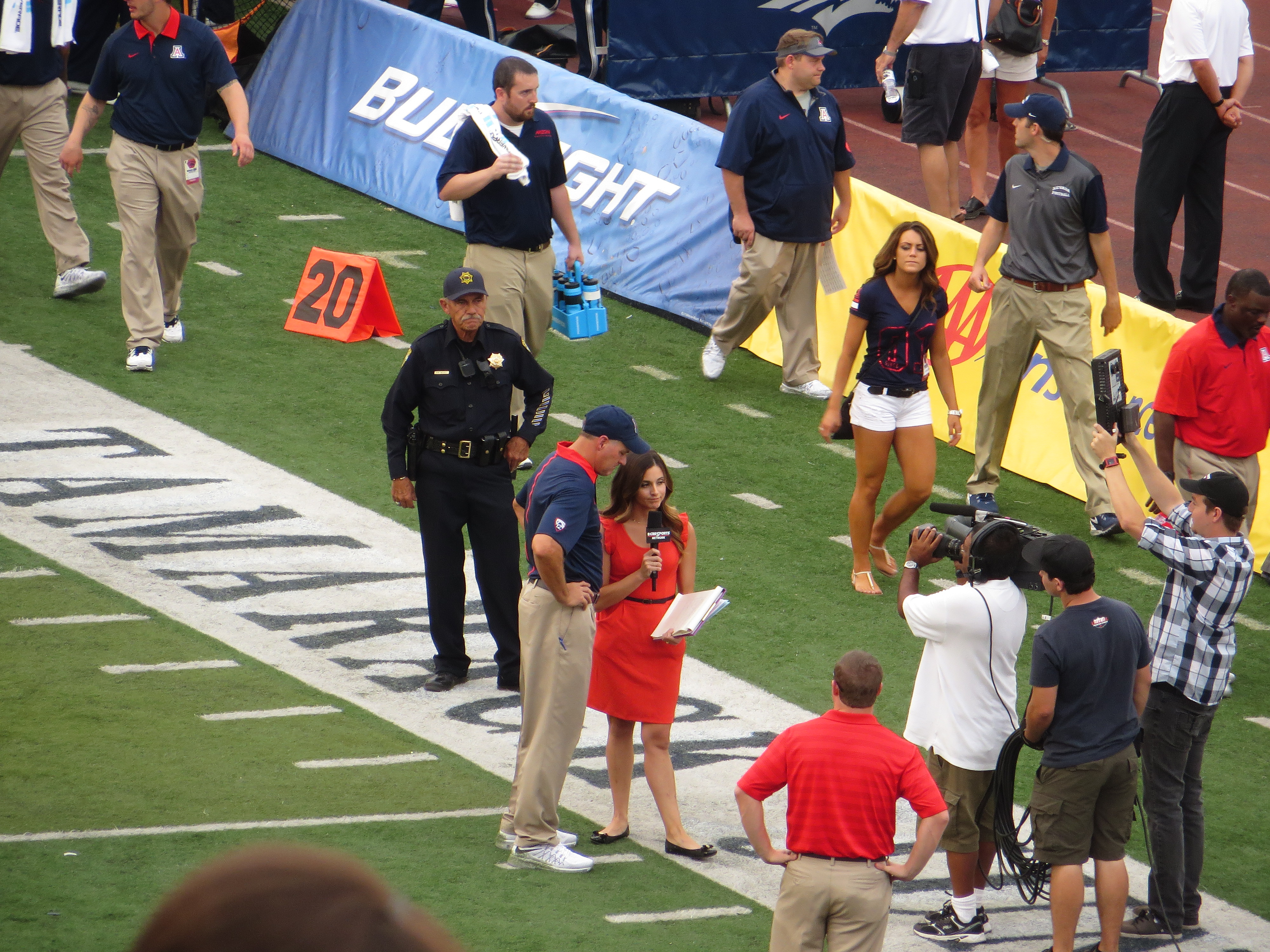
Sideline Reporter Interviewing Rich Rodriguez

Following Rodriguez's tenure at CBS, he was hired as the 30th head coach of the Arizona Wildcats football program on November 21, 2011. His hiring was first announced by University of Arizona athletic director Greg Byrne on Twitter while a press conference officially announcing him as the head coach was held a day later at McKale Center in Tucson. Rodriguez's hiring ended a 41-day search for a head coach which started after Mike Stoops was dismissed after eight seasons as Wildcat head coach.

==== 2012 ====
In Rodriguez's first season at Arizona, the Wildcats finished the season 8–5 with a win over Nevada in the New Mexico Bowl. The season, which included Arizona running back Ka'Deem Carey breaking the school single-season records for rushing yards and rushing touchdowns, was Rodriguez' first winning debut season and first bowl appearance in a debut season. It also tied Jim Young for the most wins in an Arizona coach's debut season.

==== 2013 ====
The Wildcats posted an 8–5 record in Rodriguez' second season as head coach. The season saw the emergence of star running back Carey and was capped with a victory over Boston College in the AdvoCare V100 Bowl.

==== 2014 ====
In his third year, Rodriguez led the Wildcats to their first 5–0 start and top 10 ranking since 1998 after beating No. 2 Oregon 31–24. He then lost his first game to Southern California and subsequently lost to UCLA. After compiling an 0–2 mark against in-state arch-rival Arizona State his first two years, Rodriguez's Wildcats defeated the Sun Devils, 42–35 in 2014 to win the Pac-12 South Division, the first divisional championship in program history.

The Wildcats advanced to the Pac-12 Football Championship Game at Levi's Stadium in Santa Clara, California, where they were defeated by their conference rivals, the Oregon Ducks, 51–13 (despite winning the regular season match-up). The Wildcats then played in the 2014 Fiesta Bowl, the school's third major-bowl appearance, where they faced the Boise State Broncos. Arizona lost the game to Boise State, 38–30. Under Coach Rodriguez, the Wildcats finished the 2014 season with a record of 10–4 (7–2 Pac-12), achieving only the second 10-win regular season in program history; the Wildcats also finished the season ranked #17 in the USA Today Coaches Poll and #19 in the AP Poll.

==== 2017 ====
In what turned out to be his final game at Arizona, he coached the Wildcats to a 38-35 loss against Purdue in the 2017 Foster Farms Bowl on December 27, 2017.

==== Firing ====
Rodriguez's former administrative assistant filed a multimillion-dollar claim accusing him of sexually harassing her and creating a hostile work environment for years. Rodriguez was fired on January 2, 2018, after a three-month internal investigation by the Arizona Wildcats. He admitted to having an extramarital affair, but denied all allegations of other sexual misconduct. The lawsuit filed by his former administrative assistant was dismissed in September 2019.

=== Ole Miss ===
On December 31, 2018, it was announced that Rodriguez accepted the offensive coordinator position at the University of Mississippi (Ole Miss), joining newly hired defensive coordinator Mike MacIntyre (recently fired head coach at Colorado) on the staff of head coach Matt Luke. He received a three-year contract. After Matt Luke was fired in December 2019, new head coach Lane Kiffin did not offer a contract to Rodriguez.

=== Louisiana–Monroe ===
On January 12, 2021, it was announced that Rodriguez had accepted the offensive coordinator position at the University of Louisiana at Monroe.

=== Jacksonville State ===
On November 30, 2021, Rodriguez was introduced as the new head coach of the Jacksonville State Gamecocks. During Rodriguez’s tenure with the Gamecocks, he aided their transition from FCS to FBS, producing three nine-win seasons and two conference titles. His implementation of the spread option led to Jacksonville State to become one of the top rushing offenses in the country, with running back Tre Stewart rushing for 1,604 yards and 23 touchdowns (both 3rd in the country) and quarterback Tyler Huff rushing for 1,343 yards and 14 touchdowns (12th and 23rd respectively).

=== Return to West Virginia ===
On December 11, 2024, it was reported that Rodriguez and West Virginia University had agreed in principle that he would become the next head football coach of the West Virginia Mountaineers with contract terms and language yet to be finalized. On December 12, 2024, he was officially named the 36th head football coach in the history of the West Virginia Mountaineers. Rodriguez' contract has been reported to be five years, averaging $3.75 million and starting at $3.5 million. This will be less than his predecessor, Neal Brown, made in 2024 and make him the lowest paid head football coach in the Big 12.

On March 11, 2025, Rodriguez announced that he would be banning his Mountaineers players from dancing on TikTok, saying he wanted his team to "have a hard edge."

== Spread option ==
Rodriguez is considered a pioneer of a no huddle, run-oriented version of the spread offense, although a pass-first version was already being implemented by others. He first developed this offensive approach at Glenville State and refined it during his stops at Tulane with Shaun King, at Clemson with Woodrow Dantzler, and at West Virginia most notably with dual-threat quarterback Pat White. This strategy features frequent use of the shotgun formation. Rodriguez is also credited for popularizing the zone read play run out of the shotgun formation. Per his recollection, in practice, he noted the quarterback seeing a defender honing in on the running back on a planned handoff, and took the ball himself. When Rodriguez asked why the quarterback changed the play, he responded that he read the defender and chose to run a different play than scripted.

== Family ==
Rodriguez and his wife, Rita, have two children, Raquel and Rhett. Rhett is a former college football quarterback. His grandfather is originally from Spain.

== Head coaching record ==
Year	Team	Overall	Conference	Standing	Bowl/playoffs	Coaches^{#}	AP^{°}
Salem Tigers (West Virginia Intercollegiate Athletic Conference) (1988)
1988	Salem	2–8	2–5	T–5th			
Salem:		2–8	2–5				
Glenville State Pioneers (West Virginia Intercollegiate Athletic Conference) (1990–1996)
1990	Glenville State	1–7–1	1–5	T–6th			
1991	Glenville State	4–5–1	3–4	T–5th			
1992	Glenville State	6–4	5–2	3rd			
1993	Glenville State	10–3	6–1	1st	L NAIA Division I Championship		
1994	Glenville State	8–3	5–1	T–1st	L NAIA Division I Quarterfinal		
1995	Glenville State	8–2	6–1	T–1st			
1996	Glenville State	6–4	6–1	T–1st			
Glenville State:		43–28–2	32–15				
West Virginia Mountaineers (Big East Conference) (2001–2007)
2001	West Virginia	3–8	1–6	7th			
2002	West Virginia	9–4	6–1	2nd	L Continental Tire	20	25
2003	West Virginia	8–5	6–1	T–1st	L Gator		
2004	West Virginia	8–4	4–2	T–1st	L Gator		
2005	West Virginia	11–1	7–0	1st	W Sugar^{†}	6	5
2006	West Virginia	11–2	5–2	T–2nd	W Gator	10	10
2007	West Virginia	10–2	5–2	T–1st	Fiesta (Note: Rodriguez left for Michigan after the regular season; assistant coach Bill Stewart was appointed as interim head coach and led West Virginia in the Fiesta Bowl.)^{†}	9	11
Michigan Wolverines (Big Ten Conference) (2008–2010)
2008	Michigan	3–9	2–6	T–9th			
2009	Michigan	5–7	1–7	T–10th			
2010	Michigan	7–6	3–5	T–7th	L Gator		
Michigan:		15–22	6–18				
Arizona Wildcats (Pac-12 Conference) (2012–2017)
2012	Arizona	8–5	4–5	4th (South)	W New Mexico		
2013	Arizona	8–5	4–5	4th (South)	W AdvoCare V100		
2014	Arizona	10–4	7–2	1st (South)	L Fiesta^{†}	17	19
2015	Arizona	7–6	3–6	5th (South)	W New Mexico		
2016	Arizona	3–9	1–8	6th (South)			
2017	Arizona	7–6	5–4	3rd (South)	L Foster Farms		
Arizona:		43–35	24–30				
Jacksonville State Gamecocks (ASUN Conference) (2022)
2022	Jacksonville State	9–2	5–0	1st (Note: Jacksonville State finished the 2022 season with the best record in the ASUN Conference, but was ineligible for the conference title and the postseason due to the program's transition to the NCAA Division I Football Bowl Subdivision (FBS).)			
Jacksonville State Gamecocks (Conference USA) (2023–2024)
2023	Jacksonville State	9–4	6–2	3rd	W New Orleans		
2024	Jacksonville State	9–4	7–1	1st	Cure (Note: Rodriguez left to return to West Virginia after the regular season; assistant coach Rod Smith was appointed as interim head coach and led Jacksonville State in the Cure Bowl.)		
Jacksonville State:		27–10	18–3				
West Virginia Mountaineers (Big 12 Conference) (2025–present)
2025	West Virginia	4–8	2–7	T–13th			
2026	West Virginia	5–6	2–6				
West Virginia:		69–40	38–27				
Total:		199–143–2					
National championship Conference title Conference division title or championship game berth
^{†}Indicates BCS or CFP / New Years' Six bowl.; ^{#}Rankings from final Coaches Poll.; ^{°}Rankings from final AP Poll.
