= Trey Griffey =

American football player (born 1994)

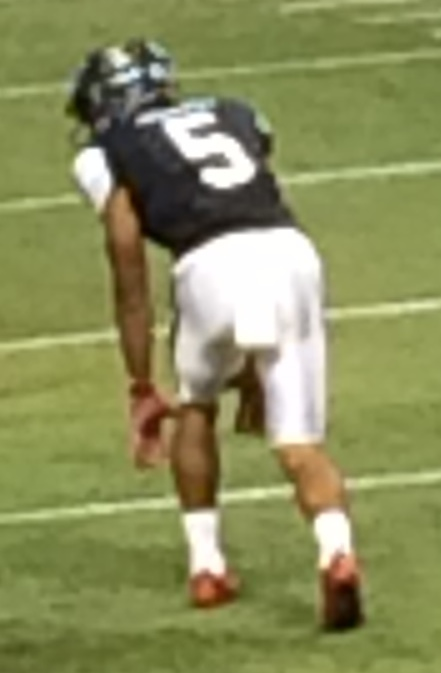
- Griffey at the 2017 East–West Shrine Game

Profile
- Position: Wide receiver

Personal information
- Born: January 19, 1994 (age 32); Seattle, Washington, U.S.
- Listed height: 6 ft 3 in (1.91 m)
- Listed weight: 209 lb (95 kg)

Career information
- High school: Dr. Phillips (Orlando, Florida)
- College: Arizona
- NFL draft: 2017: undrafted

Career history
- Indianapolis Colts (2017)*; Miami Dolphins (2017)*; Pittsburgh Steelers (2018–2019)*
- * Offseason or practice squad member only
- Stats at Pro Football Reference

George Kenneth "Trey" Griffey III (born January 19, 1994) is an American former football wide receiver. He played college football for the University of Arizona. He is the son of Major League Baseball Hall of Famer Ken Griffey Jr.

== Amateur career ==
Griffey attended Dr. Phillips High School in Orlando, Florida. As a senior, he had 73 receptions for 970 yards and 11 touchdowns. He committed to the University of Arizona to play college football.

After redshirting his first year at Arizona in 2012, Griffey played in 11 games with four starts in 2013. He had 14 receptions for 170 yards and two touchdowns. As a sophomore in 2014, he played in all 14 games with two starts and recorded 31 receptions for 405 yards and a touchdown. As a junior, he played in six games due to an injury. He finished with 11 receptions for 284 yards and one touchdown.

== Professional career ==
=== Indianapolis Colts ===
Griffey was not selected in the 2017 NFL draft. He signed with the Indianapolis Colts as an undrafted free agent on May 4, 2017. On June 12, he was waived/injured by the Colts and placed on injured reserve. Griffey was waived from injured reserve on July 7.

=== Miami Dolphins ===
On August 15, 2017, Griffey was signed by the Miami Dolphins. He was waived by the Dolphins on September 2.

=== Pittsburgh Steelers ===
On January 29, 2018, Griffey signed a reserve/future contract with the Pittsburgh Steelers. He was waived by the Steelers on September 1, and was re-signed to the practice squad the next day. Griffey signed a reserve/future contract with the Steelers on January 1, 2019. He was waived by Pittsburgh on August 31.

== Personal life ==
Griffey is the son of Major League Baseball (MLB) player Ken Griffey Jr., and the grandson of MLB player Ken Griffey Sr. Trey Griffey was drafted by the Seattle Mariners in the 24th round of the 2016 MLB draft; both his father and grandfather played for the Mariners. That round was chosen because Griffey Jr.'s uniform number with the Mariners was 24.
