= Grant Town, West Virginia =

- Town
- Location of Grant Town in Marion County, West Virginia.
- Coordinates: 39°33′26″N 80°10′43″W
- Country: United States
- State: West Virginia
- County: Marion

Area
  - Total: 0.54 sq mi (1.40 km^{2})
  - Land: 0.53 sq mi (1.37 km^{2})
  - Water: 0.015 sq mi (0.04 km^{2})
- Elevation: 988 ft (301 m)

Population (2020)
  - Total: 685
  - Estimate (2021): 685
  - Density: 1,127.0/sq mi (435.14/km^{2})
- Time zone: UTC-5 (Eastern (EST))
  - Summer (DST): UTC-4 (EDT)
- ZIP code: 26574
- Area code: 304
- FIPS code: 54-32908
- GNIS feature ID: 1554592
- Website: https://granttown.myruralwater.com/

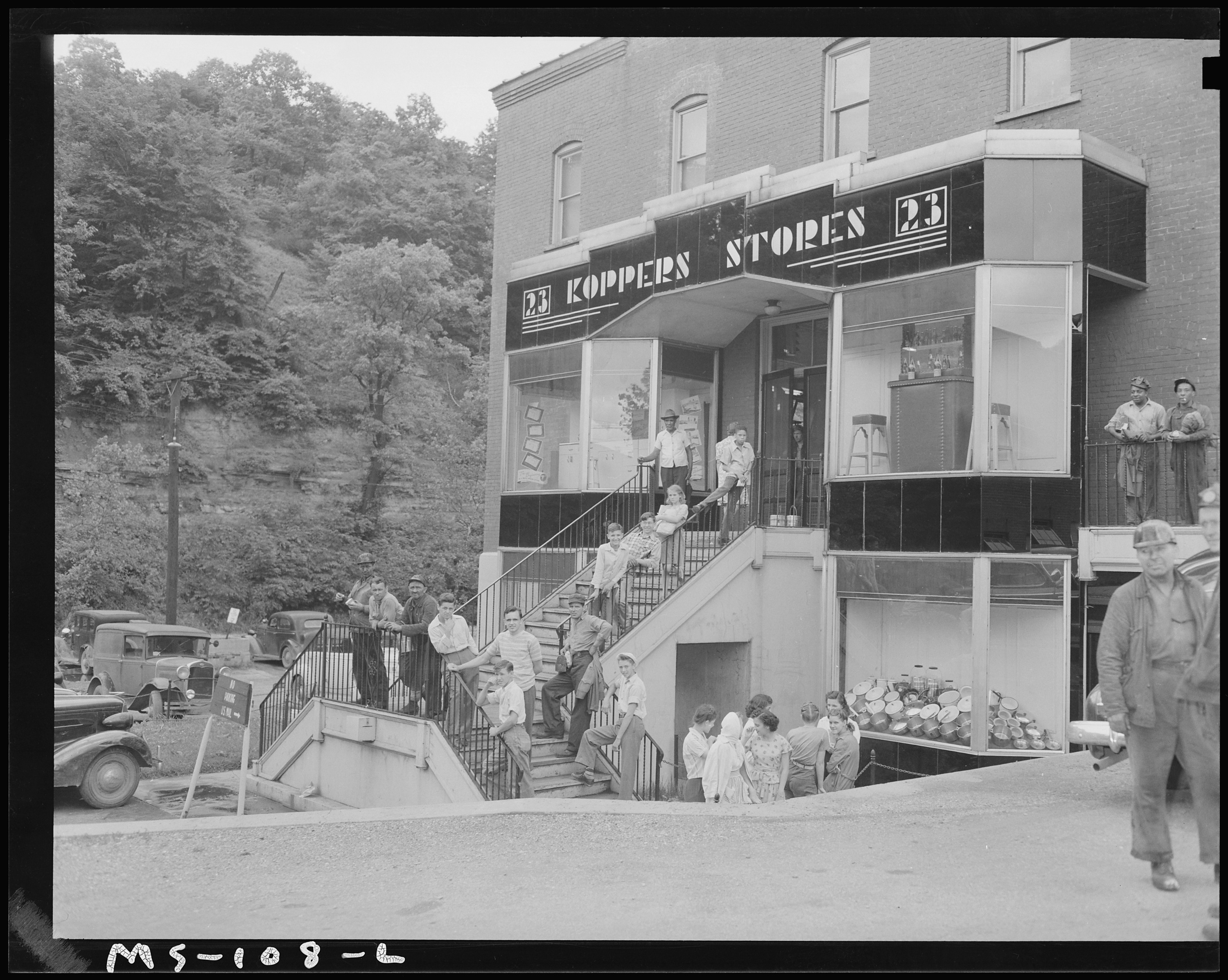
Company store in Grant Town, 1946

Grant Town is a town in Marion County, West Virginia, in the eastern United States. The population was 690 at the 2020 census.

The town was formed in 1901 with the opening of the Federal Coal and Coke Company bituminous coal mine, and was named for Robert Grant, vice president of the coal company. The "Federal No. 1" mine remained open for the next 84 years until its closure in 1985. At one point it was the largest underground coal mine in the world in terms of gross production, mining the Pittsburgh coal seam. The town was incorporated as a municipality in 1946.

Grant Town is the site of an 80 Megawatt electrical generation facility, located adjacent to the coal refuse areas above the town. The plant, which was built in the early 1990s is controlled by Edison International and generates electricity using a fluidized bed combustion boiler process burning waste coal.

Grant Town is the location of a number of the stories of the West Virginia ghost story anthology The Telltale Lilac Bush, by Fairmont State University professor Ruth Ann Musick. The town, the mine and surrounding farms are prominently featured in a number of the stories. Musick includes a description of the town, circa 1965, in an introduction to a section on mine ghost stories:

"The Grant Town Mine, the scene of four of the stories here, is one of the largest in the United States, and possibly in the world. The town itself, with a population of a little over a thousand, is about seven miles northwest of Fairmont. Surrounded by hills, it is a kind of a sunken garden--a well at the bottom of the stairway of hills and highways--so that it seems to be in a world of its own. In a way, perhaps, it is. At least fourteen different European nationalities live in the town and work in the mine."

== Notable people ==
Notable Grant Town natives include Charles Csuri, a pioneer in the field of computer art, current West Virginia University head football coach Rich Rodriguez, and Tom Wilson, creator of the comic strip Ziggy.

== Geography ==
Grant Town is located at 39°33′26″N 80°10′43″W (39.557358, -80.178485).

According to the United States Census Bureau, the town has a total area of 0.55 square miles (1.42 km^{2}), of which 0.53 square miles (1.37 km^{2}) is land and 0.02 square miles (0.05 km^{2}) is water.

== Demographics ==
Historical population
Census	Pop.	Note	%±
1950	1,273		—
1960	1,105		−13.2%
1970	946		−14.4%
1980	987		4.3%
1990	694		−29.7%
2000	657		−5.3%
2010	613		−6.7%
2020	685		11.7%
2021 (est.)	685	Steady	0.0%
U.S. Decennial Census

=== 2010 census ===
As of the census of 2010, there were 613 people, 260 households, and 171 families living in the town. The population density was 1,156.6 inhabitants per square mile (446.6/km^{2}). There were 305 housing units at an average density of 575.5 per square mile (222.2/km^{2}). The racial makeup of the town was 91.0% White, 7.3% African American, 0.2% Native American, and 1.5% from two or more races. Hispanic or Latino of any race were 0.5% of the population.

There were 260 households, of which 27.7% had children under the age of 18 living with them, 49.2% were married couples living together, 10.8% had a female householder with no husband present, 5.8% had a male householder with no wife present, and 34.2% were non-families. 29.6% of all households were made up of individuals, and 15% had someone living alone who was 65 years of age or older. The average household size was 2.36 and the average family size was 2.88.

The median age in the town was 41.8 years. 19.4% of residents were under the age of 18; 7% were between the ages of 18 and 24; 27.8% were from 25 to 44; 29.1% were from 45 to 64; and 16.8% were 65 years of age or older. The gender makeup of the town was 47.8% male and 52.2% female.

=== 2000 census ===
As of the census of 2000, there were 657 people, 270 households, and 190 families living in the town. The population density was 1,199.3 inhabitants per square mile (461.2/km^{2}). There were 316 housing units at an average density of 576.8 per square mile (221.8/km^{2}). The racial makeup of the town was 90.87% White, 7.76% African American, 0.15% Asian, 0.30% from other races, and 0.91% from two or more races. Hispanic or Latino of any race were 0.46% of the population.

There were 270 households, out of which 27.0% had children under the age of 18 living with them, 52.2% were married couples living together, 12.6% had a female householder with no husband present, and 29.6% were non-families. 27.8% of all households were made up of individuals, and 18.5% had someone living alone who was 65 years of age or older. The average household size was 2.43 and the average family size was 2.95.

In the town, the population was spread out, with 21.8% under the age of 18, 8.7% from 18 to 24, 25.9% from 25 to 44, 23.9% from 45 to 64, and 19.8% who were 65 years of age or older. The median age was 40 years. For every 100 females, there were 85.1 males. For every 100 females age 18 and over, there were 80.4 males.

The median income for a household in the town was $24,722, and the median income for a family was $29,250. Males had a median income of $23,750 versus $22,083 for females. The per capita income for the town was $12,717. About 16.9% of families and 21.7% of the population were below the poverty line, including 38.3% of those under age 18 and 8.3% of those age 65 or over.

== Folklore ==
=== The Vegetable Man ===
Just north of Fairmont, West Virginia in Grant Town, residents often speak about the little known hoax known as the “Vegetable Man”. Jennings H. Frederick first believed to have seen the “Vegetable Man” in July, 1968. “Frederick recalls walking through the woods during an unsuccessful hunt for woodchuck when he heard a jabbering voice that he said sounded like a sped-up recording (Gorski, 2023). According to a newsletter written by Gray Baxter, a known hoaxter from the 50s and through the 80s who specialized in UFOs and paranormal events, this is what the creature said:

“YOU NEED NOT FEAR ME. I WISH TO COMMUNICATE. I COME AS FRIENDS. WE KNOW OF YOU ALL. I COME IN PEACE. I WISH MEDICAL ASSISTANCE. I NEED YOUR HELP!”

“Surprised, Frederick felt his arm catch on a patch of brambles. When he looked down, he realized that what he thought were brambles was actually a three-fingered hand that was “green like a plant.” Frederick said the fingers were seven inches long, with “needle-like tips" and suction cups,” which had attached themselves to his arm. “He heard a suction sound and knew blood was being drawn,” said the newsletter. The creature reminded Frederick of “the stalk of some huge ungainly plant,” but the creature was surprisingly strong. Its eyes turned from yellow to red as they began to spin, hypnotizing Frederick and distracting him from the pain in his arm. Frederick believed the “transfusion” lasted about a minute until it released him and ran up the hill “covering 25 ft. or more in each leap, like a modern ‘Spring healed Jack.'”(Gorski, 2023). Barker has created many renderings of Frederick's encounter and fans of the cryptid can witness these works of art at the Clarksburg-Harrison Public Library.

The first annual “Veggie Man Day” was held on July 13, 2024, at the Frank and Jane Gabor West Virginia Folklife Center in Fairmont, WV. This event aimed to bring this enigmatic figure into the spotlight. The residents of Fairmont and the surrounding areas wanted to celebrate West Virginia's rich tradition of cryptid lore. This event offered a variety of activities and the chance to immerse themselves in the mysterious world of the “Vegetable Man”. The town of Farimont plan to continue the tradition of celebrating the “Vegetable Man” each year on the annual “visit” from cryptid on July 13.
