= Arizona Wildcats football statistical leaders =

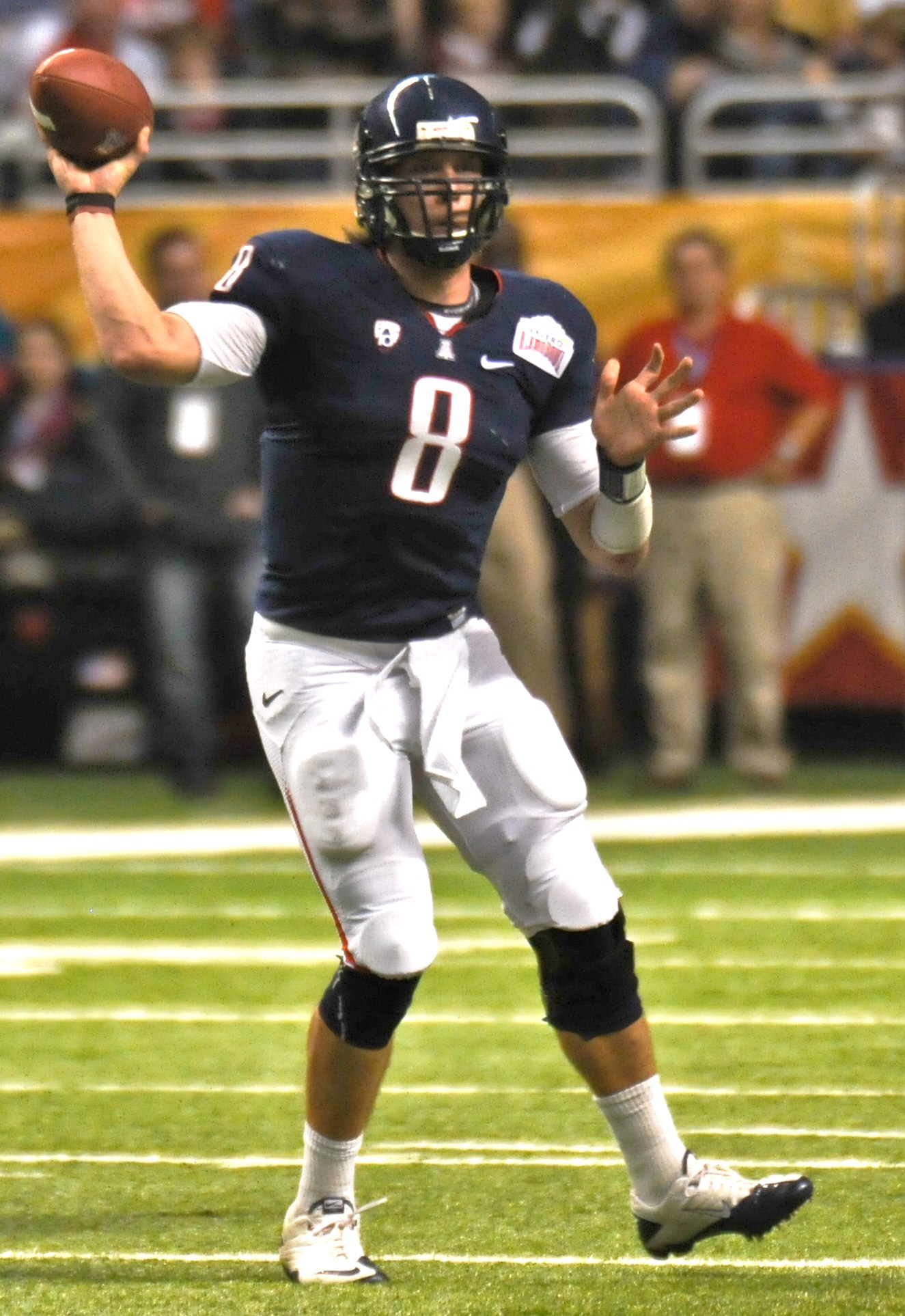
Nick Foles was the Wildcats' career passing yards leader before he was surpassed by Noah Fifita.

The Arizona Wildcats football statistical leaders are individual statistical leaders of the Arizona Wildcats football program in various categories, including passing, rushing, receiving, total offense, defensive stats, and kicking. Within those areas, the lists identify single-game, single-season, and career leaders. The Wildcats represent the University of Arizona in the NCAA Division I FBS Big 12 Conference.

Although Arizona began competing in intercollegiate football in 1899, the school's official record book does not generally include stats from before the 1950s, as records from this era and earlier are often incomplete and inconsistent.

These lists are dominated by more recent players for several reasons:

- Since the 1950s, seasons have increased from 10 games to 11 and then 12 games in length.
- The NCAA didn't allow freshmen to play varsity football until 1972 (with the exception of the World War II years), allowing players to have four-year careers.
- Bowl games only began counting toward single-season and career statistics in 2002. The Wildcats have played in eight bowl games since this decision, giving recent players a potential extra game to accumulate statistics.
- The Wildcats have surpassed 5,000 yards nine times in school history, all since 1998 and seven times since 2008. They have eclipsed 6,000 yards twice under former head coach Rich Rodriguez.

These lists are updated through Week 12 of the 2026 season. Active players are highlighted in bold.

== Passing ==
=== Passing yards ===
Career
| Rank | Player | Yards | Years |
|---|---|---|---|
| 1 | **Noah Fifita** | 12,656 | 2022 2023 2024 2025 2026 |
| 2 | Nick Foles | 10,011 | 2009 2010 2011 |
| 3 | Willie Tuitama | 9,211 | 2005 2006 2007 2008 |
| 4 | Tom Tunnicliffe | 7,618 | 1980 1981 1982 1983 |
| 5 | Anu Solomon | 6,922 | 2014 2015 2016 |
| 6 | Khalil Tate | 6,318 | 2016 2017 2018 2019 |
| 7 | Alfred Jenkins | 6,016 | 1983 1984 1985 1986 |
| 7 | Keith Smith | 5,972 | 1996 1997 1998 1999 |
| 9 | Jason Johnson | 5,749 | 1999 2000 2001 2002 |
| 10 | Dan White | 5,723 | 1993 1994 1995 |

Single season
| Rank | Player | Yards | Year |
|---|---|---|---|
| 1 | Nick Foles | 4,334 | 2011 |
| 2 | Anu Solomon | 3,793 | 2014 |
| 3 | Jayden de Laura | 3,685 | 2022 |
| 4 | Willie Tuitama | 3,683 | 2007 |
| 5 | Matt Scott | 3,620 | 2012 |
| 6 | **Noah Fifita** | 3,473 | 2026 |
| 7 | Jason Johnson | 3,327 | 2002 |
| 8 | Noah Fifita | 3,228 | 2025 |
| 9 | Nick Foles | 3,191 | 2010 |
| 10 | Willie Tuitama | 3,088 | 2008 |

Single game
| Rank | Player | Yards | Year | Opponent |
|---|---|---|---|---|
| 1 | Noah Fifita | 527 | 2023 | Arizona State |
| 2 | Anu Solomon | 520 | 2014 | California |
| 3 | Willie Tuitama | 510 | 2007 | Washington |
| 4 | Jason Johnson | 492 | 2002 | California |
| 5 | Matt Scott | 491 | 2012 | Stanford |
| 6 | Jayden de Laura | 484 | 2022 | Colorado |
| 7 | Nick Foles | 448 | 2010 | Oregon |
| 8 | Willie Tuitama | 446 | 2007 | New Mexico |
| 9 | Jason Johnson | 443 | 2002 | Washington |
| 10 | Nick Foles | 440 | 2010 | Oregon State |

=== Passing touchdowns ===
Career
| Rank | Player | TDs | Years |
|---|---|---|---|
| 1 | **Noah Fifita** | 99 | 2022 2023 2024 2025 2026 |
| 2 | Willie Tuitama | 67 | 2005 2006 2007 2008 |
| | Nick Foles | 67 | 2009 2010 2011 |
| 3 | Khalil Tate | 57 | 2016 2017 2018 2019 |
| 4 | Anu Solomon | 49 | 2014 2015 2016 |
| 5 | Tom Tunnicliffe | 46 | 1980 1981 1982 1983 |
| 6 | Bruce Hill | 45 | 1973 1974 1975 |
| 8 | Dan White | 43 | 1993 1994 1995 |
| 9 | Keith Smith | 42 | 1996 1997 1998 1999 |
| | Ortege Jenkins | 42 | 1997 1998 1999 2000 |

Single season
| Rank | Player | TDs | Year |
|---|---|---|---|
| 1 | Noah Fifita | 29 | 2025 |
| 2 | Willie Tuitama | 28 | 2007 |
| | Nick Foles | 28 | 2011 |
| | Anu Solomon | 28 | 2014 |
| 5 | Matt Scott | 27 | 2012 |
| 6 | Khalil Tate | 26 | 2018 |
| | **Noah Fifita** | 26 | 2026 |
| 8 | Jayden de Laura | 25 | 2022 |
| | Noah Fifita | 25 | 2023 |
| 10 | Willie Tuitama | 23 | 2008 |

Single game
| Rank | Player | TDs | Year | Opponent |
|---|---|---|---|---|
| 1 | Tom Tunnicliffe | 6 | 1982 | Pacific |
| | Jayden de Laura | 6 | 2022 | Colorado |
| 3 | Keith Smith | 5 | 1996 | California |
| | Willie Tuitama | 5 | 2007 | Northern Arizona |
| | Willie Tuitama | 5 | 2007 | Washington |
| | Nick Foles | 5 | 2011 | Northern Arizona |
| | Anu Solomon | 5 | 2014 | California |
| | Anu Solomon | 5 | 2014 | Washington State |
| | Khalil Tate | 5 | 2017 | Purdue |
| | Khalil Tate | 5 | 2018 | Southern Utah |
| | Khalil Tate | 5 | 2018 | Colorado |
| | Noah Fifita | 5 | 2023 | USC |
| | Noah Fifita | 5 | 2023 | Arizona State |
| | Noah Fifita | 5 | 2025 | Weber State |
| | Noah Fifita | 5 | 2025 | Oklahoma State |

== Rushing ==
=== Rushing yards ===
Career
| Rank | Player | Yards | Years |
|---|---|---|---|
| 1 | Ka'Deem Carey | 4,239 | 2011 2012 2013 |
| 2 | Trung Canidate | 3,824 | 1996 1997 1998 1999 |
| 3 | Ontiwaun Carter | 3,501 | 1991 1992 1993 1994 |
| 4 | Art Luppino | 3,381 | 1953 1954 1955 1956 |
| 5 | J. J. Taylor | 3,263 | 2016 2017 2018 2019 |
| 6 | Mike Bell | 3,163 | 2002 2003 2004 2005 |
| 7 | Hubie Oliver | 3,096 | 1977 1978 1979 1980 |
| 8 | Nick Wilson | 3,034 | 2014 2015 2016 2017 |
| 9 | Nic Grigsby | 2,957 | 2007 2008 2009 2010 |
| 10 | David Adams | 2,571 | 1984 1985 1986 |

Single season
| Rank | Player | Yards | Year |
|---|---|---|---|
| 1 | Ka'Deem Carey | 1,929 | 2012 |
| 2 | Ka'Deem Carey | 1,885 | 2013 |
| 3 | Trung Canidate | 1,602 | 1999 |
| 4 | J.J. Taylor | 1,434 | 2018 |
| 5 | Khalil Tate | 1,411 | 2017 |
| 6 | Nick Wilson | 1,375 | 2014 |
| 7 | Art Luppino | 1,359 | 1954 |
| 8 | Art Luppino | 1,313 | 1955 |
| 9 | Clarence Farmer | 1,229 | 2001 |
| 10 | Trung Canidate | 1,220 | 1998 |

Single game
| Rank | Player | Yards | Year | Opponent |
|---|---|---|---|---|
| 1 | Ka'Deem Carey | 366 | 2012 | Colorado |
| 2 | Khalil Tate | 327 | 2017 | Colorado |
| 3 | Trung Canidate | 288 | 1998 | Arizona State |
| 4 | J.J. Taylor | 284 | 2018 | Oregon State |
| 5 | Ka'Deem Carey | 236 | 2013 | Utah |
| 6 | Jim Upchurch | 232 | 1973 | UTEP |
| 7 | Khalil Tate | 230 | 2017 | UCLA |
| 8 | Art Luppino | 228 | 1954 | New Mexico State |
| 9 | Ontiwaun Carter | 224 | 1994 | Colorado State |
| 10 | Mike Bell | 222 | 2003 | Washington |

=== Rushing touchdowns ===
Career
| Rank | Player | TDs | Years |
|---|---|---|---|
| 1 | Ka'Deem Carey | 48 | 2011 2012 2013 |
| 2 | Art Luppino | 44 | 1953 1954 1955 1956 |
| 3 | Nick Wilson | 33 | 2014 2015 2016 2017 |
| 4 | Nic Grigsby | 28 | 2007 2008 2009 2010 |
| 5 | Ronald Veal | 27 | 1987 1988 1989 1990 |
| 6 | Keola Antolin | 26 | 2008 2009 2010 2011 |
| 7 | Trung Canidate | 25 | 1996 1997 1998 1999 |
| 8 | Ontiwaun Carter | 21 | 1991 1992 1993 1994 |
| 9 | Vance Johnson | 20 | 1981 1982 1983 1984 |
| | Kelvin Eafon | 20 | 1996 1997 1998 |

Single season
| Rank | Player | TDs | Year |
|---|---|---|---|
| 1 | Ka'Deem Carey | 23 | 2012 |
| 2 | Art Luppino | 21 | 1954 |
| 3 | Ka'Deem Carey | 19 | 2013 |
| 4 | Kelvin Eafon | 16 | 1998 |
| | Nick Wilson | 16 | 2014 |
| 6 | Nic Grigsby | 13 | 2008 |
| | B.J. Denker | 13 | 2013 |
| 8 | Khalil Tate | 12 | 2017 |

Single game
| Rank | Player | TDs | Year | Opponent |
|---|---|---|---|---|
| 1 | Ka'Deem Carey | 5 | 2012 | Colorado |

== Receiving ==
=== Receptions ===
Career
| Rank | Player | Rec | Years |
|---|---|---|---|
| 1 | Mike Thomas | 259 | 2005 2006 2007 2008 |
| 2 | Bobby Wade | 230 | 1999 2000 2001 2002 |
| 3 | Dennis Northcutt | 223 | 1996 1997 1998 1999 |
| 4 | Tetairoa McMillan | 213 | 2022 2023 2024 |
| 5 | Juron Criner | 209 | 2008 2009 2010 2011 |
| 6 | Jacob Cowing | 175 | 2022 2023 |
| 7 | Theo Bell | 153 | 1972 1973 1974 1975 |
| | Nate Phillips | 153 | 2013 2014 2015 2016 |
| 9 | David Douglas | 151 | 2008 2009 2010 2011 |
| 10 | Austin Hill | 147 | 2011 2012 2013 2014 |

Single season
| Rank | Player | Rec | Year |
|---|---|---|---|
| 1 | Bobby Wade | 93 | 2002 |
| 2 | Tetairoa McMillan | 90 | 2023 |
| | Jacob Cowing | 90 | 2023 |
| 4 | Dennis Northcutt | 88 | 1999 |
| 5 | Jacob Cowing | 85 | 2022 |
| 6 | Tetairoa McMillan | 84 | 2024 |
| 7 | Mike Thomas | 83 | 2007 |
| | Stanley Berryhill III | 83 | 2021 |
| 9 | Juron Criner | 82 | 2010 |
| 10 | Austin Hill | 81 | 2012 |

Single game
| Rank | Player | Rec | Year | Opponent |
|---|---|---|---|---|
| 1 | Jeremy McDaniel | 14 | 1996 | California |
| 2 | Cayleb Jones | 13 | 2014 | California |
| 3 | Dave Hibbert | 12 | 1958 | Texas Tech |
| | Jim Greth | 12 | 1966 | Iowa State |
| | Bobby Wade | 12 | 2002 | Oregon |
| | Mike Thomas | 12 | 2007 | California |
| | Mike Thomas | 12 | 2007 | USC |
| | Rob Gronkowski | 12 | 2008 | Oregon |
| | Juron Criner | 12 | 2009 | Stanford |
| | David Roberts | 12 | 2009 | Washington |
| | Juron Criner | 12 | 2010 | Oregon State |
| | Stanley Berryhill III | 12 | 2021 | BYU |
| | Jacob Cowing | 12 | 2022 | Colorado |

=== Receiving yards ===
Career
| Rank | Player | Yards | Years |
|---|---|---|---|
| 1 | Tetairoa McMillan | 3,423 | 2022 2023 2024 |
| 2 | Bobby Wade | 3,351 | 1999 2000 2001 2002 |
| 3 | Dennis Northcutt | 3,252 | 1996 1997 1998 1999 |
| 4 | Mike Thomas | 3,231 | 2005 2006 2007 2008 |
| 5 | Juron Criner | 2,859 | 2008 2009 2010 2011 |
| 6 | Theo Bell | 2,509 | 1972 1973 1974 1975 |
| 7 | Jon Horton | 2,415 | 1983 1984 1985 1986 |
| 8 | Austin Hill | 2,280 | 2011 2012 2013 2014 |
| 9 | Richard Dice | 1,957 | 1993 1994 1995 1996 |
| 10 | Samajie Grant | 1,946 | 2013 2014 2015 2016 |

Single season
| Rank | Player | Yards | Year |
|---|---|---|---|
| 1 | Dennis Northcutt | 1,422 | 1999 |
| 2 | Tetairoa McMillan | 1,402 | 2023 |
| 3 | Bobby Wade | 1,389 | 2002 |
| 4 | Austin Hill | 1,364 | 2012 |
| 5 | Tetairoa McMillan | 1,319 | 2024 |
| 6 | Juron Criner | 1,233 | 2010 |
| 7 | Keith Hartwig | 1,134 | 1976 |
| 8 | Dorian Singer | 1,105 | 2022 |
| 9 | Mike Thomas | 1,038 | 2007 |
| 10 | Jacob Cowing | 1,034 | 2022 |

Single game
| Rank | Player | Yards | Year | Opponent |
|---|---|---|---|---|
| 1 | Tetairoa McMillan | 304 | 2024 | New Mexico |
| 2 | Jeremy McDaniel | 283 | 1996 | California |
| 3 | Tetairoa McMillan | 266 | 2023 | Arizona State |
| 4 | Austin Hill | 259 | 2012 | USC |
| 5 | Dennis Northcutt | 257 | 1999 | TCU |
| 6 | Bobby Wade | 222 | 2002 | California |
| 7 | Theo Bell | 217 | 1975 | New Mexico |
| | Jon Horton | 217 | 1984 | Utah State |
| 9 | Derek Hill | 208 | 1987 | Stanford |
| 10 | Charlie McKee | 205 | 1971 | Oregon State |

=== Receiving touchdowns ===
Career
| Rank | Player | TDs | Years |
|---|---|---|---|
| 1 | Juron Criner | 32 | 2008 2009 2010 2011 |
| 2 | Theo Bell | 30 | 1972 1973 1974 1975 |
| 3 | Tetairoa McMillan | 26 | 2022 2023 2024 |
| 4 | Dennis Northcutt | 24 | 1996 1997 1998 1999 |
| 5 | Bobby Wade | 23 | 1999 2000 2001 2002 |
| | Mike Thomas | 23 | 2005 2006 2007 2008 |
| 7 | Jacob Cowing | 20 | 2022 2023 |
| 8 | Charlie McKee | 19 | 1969 1970 1971 |
| 9 | Richard Dice | 17 | 1993 1994 1995 1996 |
| | Austin Hill | 17 | 2011 2012 2013 2014 |

Single season
| Rank | Player | TDs | Year |
|---|---|---|---|
| 1 | Jacob Cowing | 13 | 2023 |
| 2 | Juron Criner | 11 | 2011 |
| | Theo Bell | 11 | 1974 |
| | Mike Thomas | 11 | 2007 |
| | Juron Criner | 11 | 2010 |
| | Austin Hill | 11 | 2012 |
| | Shawn Poindexter | 11 | 2018 |
| 8 | Keith Hartwig | 10 | 1976 |
| | Rob Gronkowski | 10 | 2008 |
| | **Isaiah Mizell** | 10 | 2026 |
| | Tetairoa McMillan | 10 | 2023 |

Single game
| Rank | Player | TDs | Year | Opponent |
|---|---|---|---|---|
| 1 | Jacob Cowing | 4 | 2023 | USC |
| | Tetairoa McMillan | 4 | 2024 | New Mexico |
| 3 | Bill Glazier | 3 | 1949 | New Mexico |
| | Joe Hernandez | 3 | 1961 | New Mexico |
| | Charlie McKee | 3 | 1970 | Wyoming |
| | Scott Piper | 3 | 1975 | Northwestern |
| | Bobby Wade | 3 | 2001 | California |
| | Mike Thomas | 3 | 2007 | Washington |
| | Juron Criner | 3 | 2009 | Oregon |
| | Juron Criner | 3 | 2011 | UCLA |
| | Cayleb Jones | 3 | 2014 | California |
| | Jacob Cowing | 3 | 2022 | San Diego State |
| | Dorian Singer | 3 | 2022 | USC |

== Total offense ==
Total offense is the sum of passing and rushing statistics. It does not include receiving or returns.

=== Total offense yards ===
Career
| Rank | Player | Yards | Years |
|---|---|---|---|
| 1 | **Noah Fifita** | 13,033 | 2022 2023 2024 2025 2026 |
| 2 | Nick Foles | 9,712 | 2009 2010 2011 |
| 3 | Willie Tuitama | 8,727 | 2005 2006 2007 2008 |
| 4 | Khalil Tate | 8,603 | 2016 2017 2018 2019 |
| 5 | Anu Solomon | 7,359 | 2014 2015 2016 |
| 6 | Tom Tunnicliffe | 7,336 | 1980 1981 1982 1983 |
| 7 | Keith Smith | 7,049 | 1996 1997 1998 1999 |
| 8 | Alfred Jenkins | 6,307 | 1983 1984 1985 1986 |
| 9 | Matt Scott | 6,059 | 2008 2009 2010 2012 |
| 10 | Bruce Hill | 6,054 | 1973 1974 1975 |

Single season
| Rank | Player | Yards | Year |
|---|---|---|---|
| 1 | Nick Foles | 4,231 | 2011 |
| 2 | Matt Scott | 4,126 | 2012 |
| 3 | Anu Solomon | 4,084 | 2014 |
| 4 | Jayden de Laura | 3,807 | 2022 |
| 5 | **Noah Fifita** | 3,650 | 2026 |
| 6 | Willie Tuitama | 3,520 | 2007 |
| 7 | B.J. Denker | 3,465 | 2013 |
| 8 | Noah Fifita | 3,444 | 2025 |
| 9 | Nick Foles | 3,078 | 2010 |
| 10 | Khalil Tate | 3,002 | 2017 |

Single game
| Rank | Player | Yards | Year | Opponent |
|---|---|---|---|---|
| 1 | Anu Solomon | 566 | 2014 | California |
| 2 | Noah Fifita | 527 | 2023 | Arizona State |
| 3 | Willie Tuitama | 517 | 2007 | Washington |
| 4 | Jayden de Laura | 512 | 2022 | Colorado |
| 5 | Keith Smith | 502 | 1996 | California |
| 6 | Matt Scott | 485 | 2012 | Stanford |
| 7 | Khalil Tate | 481 (Note: The cited reference for Tate's 2017 performance against Colorado lists him with 142 yards passing. However, the box score for this game, also available at ESPN.com, lists him with 154.) | 2017 | Colorado |
| 8 | Anu Solomon | 475 | 2014 | UNLV |
| 9 | Matt Scott | 469 | 2012 | USC |
| 10 | Matt Scott | 461 | 2012 | Toledo |

=== Touchdowns responsible for ===
"Touchdowns responsible for" is the NCAA's official term for combined passing and rushing touchdowns.

Career
| Rank | Player | TDs | Years |
|---|---|---|---|
| 1 | **Noah Fifita** | 108 | 2022 2023 2024 2025 2026 |
| 2 | Khalil Tate | 75 | 2016 2017 2018 2019 |
| 3 | Willie Tuitama | 72 | 2005 2006 2007 2008 |
| 4 | Nick Foles | 71 | 2009 2010 2011 |
| 5 | Bruce Hill | 62 | 1973 1974 1975 |
| 6 | Keith Smith | 57 | 1996 1997 1998 1999 |
| 7 | Ortege Jenkins | 55 | 1997 1998 1999 2000 |
| 8 | Anu Solomon | 54 | 2014 2015 2016 |
| 9 | Tom Tunnicliffe | 53 | 1980 1981 1982 1983 |
| 10 | Ka'Deem Carey | 48 | 2011 2012 2013 |

Single season
| Rank | Player | TDs | Year |
|---|---|---|---|
| 1 | Matt Scott | 33 | 2012 |
| 2 | Noah Fifita | 32 | 2025 |
| 3 | Willie Tuitama | 31 | 2007 |
| | **Noah Fifita** | 31 | 2026 |
| 5 | Anu Solomon | 30 | 2014 |
| 6 | Jayden de Laura | 29 | 2022 |
| 7 | Nick Foles | 28 | 2011 |
| 8 | Khalil Tate | 26 | 2017 |
| 9 | Willie Tuitama | 25 | 2008 |
| | Noah Fifita | 25 | 2023 |

Single game
| Rank | Player | TDs | Year | Opponent |
|---|---|---|---|---|
| 1 | Keith Smith | 7 | 1996 | California |

== Defense ==
=== Interceptions ===
Career
| Rank | Player | Ints | Years |
|---|---|---|---|
| 1 | Chuck Cecil | 21 | 1984 1985 1986 1987 |
| 2 | Jackie Wallace | 20 | 1970 1971 1972 |
| 3 | Chris McAlister | 18 | 1996 1997 1998 |
| 4 | Antoine Cason | 15 | 2004 2005 2006 2007 |
| 5 | Allan Durden | 14 | 1982 1983 1984 1985 |
| | Darryll Lewis | 14 | 1987 1988 1989 1990 |
| 7 | Roussell Williams | 13 | 1972 1973 1974 |
| | Dave Liggins | 13 | 1978 1979 1980 |

Single season
| Rank | Player | Ints | Year |
|---|---|---|---|
| 1 | Jackie Wallace | 11 | 1971 |
| 2 | Chuck Cecil | 9 | 1987 |
| 3 | Rich Moriarty | 8 | 1968 |
| | Jackie Wallace | 8 | 1972 |
| 5 | John Black | 7 | 1939 |
| | Dennis Anderson | 7 | 1974 |
| | Dave Liggins | 7 | 1980 |

Single game
| Rank | Player | Ints | Year | Opponent |
|---|---|---|---|---|
| 1 | Chuck Cecil | 4 | 1987 | Stanford |
| 2 | Michael Johnson | 3 | 2005 | Oregon |

=== Tackles ===
Career
| Rank | Player | Tackles | Years |
|---|---|---|---|
| 1 | Ricky Hunley | 566 | 1980 1981 1982 1983 |
| 2 | Byron Evans | 552 | 1983 1984 1985 1986 |
| 3 | Obra Erby | 529 | 1973 1974 1975 1976 |
| 4 | Jon Abbott | 420 | 1974 1975 1976 1977 |
| 5 | Marcus Bell | 405 | 1996 1997 1998 1999 |
| 6 | LaMonte Hunley | 400 | 1981 1982 1983 1984 |
| 7 | Chuck Cecil | 392 | 1984 1985 1986 1987 |
| 8 | Mark Jacobs | 383 | 1974 1975 1976 |
| 9 | Sam Giangardella | 372 | 1977 1978 1979 1980 |
| 10 | Mark Arneson | 357 | 1969 1970 1971 |

Single season
| Rank | Player | Tackles | Year |
|---|---|---|---|
| 1 | Mark Jacobs | 200 | 1974 |
| 2 | Byron Evans | 196 | 1986 |
| 3 | Obra Erby | 188 | 1975 |
| 4 | Byron Evans | 188 | 1985 |
| 5 | Ricky Hunley | 176 | 1983 |
| 6 | Terrell Ransom | 175 | 1973 |
| 7 | Obra Erby | 174 | 1976 |
| 8 | Ricky Hunley | 173 | 1982 |
| 9 | LaMonte Hunley | 168 | 1984 |
| 10 | Scooby Wright III | 163 | 2014 |

=== Sacks ===
Career
| Rank | Player | Sacks | Years |
|---|---|---|---|
| 1 | Tedy Bruschi | 55.0 | 1992 1993 1994 1995 |
| 2 | Ricky Elmore | 25.5 | 2007 2008 2009 2010 |
| 3 | David Wood | 25.0 | 1981 1982 1983 1984 |
| 4 | Joe Tafoya | 24.5 | 1997 1998 1999 2000 |
| 5 | Rob Waldrop | 23.5 | 1990 1991 1992 1993 |
| 6 | Reggie Johnson | 22.5 | 1988 1989 1990 |
| 7 | Jim Hoffman | 22.5 | 1991 1992 1993 1994 |
| 8 | Danny Lockett | 22.0 | 1985 1986 |
| 9 | Joe Salavea | 21.5 | 1994 1995 1996 1997 |
| 10 | Chuck Osborne | 21.0 | 1992 1993 1994 1995 |

Single season
| Rank | Player | Sacks | Year |
|---|---|---|---|
| 1 | Tedy Bruschi | 19.0 | 1993 |
| 2 | Tedy Bruschi | 14.5 | 1995 |
| 3 | Scooby Wright III | 14.0 | 2014 |
| 4 | Steve Boadway | 13.0 | 1984 |
| 5 | Danny Lockett | 12.0 | 1985 |
| 6 | Joe Salavea | 11.5 | 1997 |
| 7 | Reggie Johnson | 11.0 | 1990 |
| | Chuck Osborne | 11.0 | 1994 |
| | Ricky Elmore | 11.0 | 2010 |

== Kicking ==
=== Field goals made ===
Career
| Rank | Player | FGs | Years |
|---|---|---|---|
| 1 | Max Zendejas | 79 | 1982 1983 1984 1985 |
| 2 | Tyler Loop | 67 | 2020 2021 2022 2023 2024 |
| 3 | Casey Skowron | 38 | 2014 2015 |
| 4 | Jason Bondzio | 35 | 2007 2008 |
| 5 | Lucas Havrisek | 34 | 2017 2018 2019 2020 2021 |

Single season
| Rank | Player | FGs | Year |
|---|---|---|---|
| 1 | Steve McLaughlin | 23 | 1994 |
| 2 | Max Zendejas | 22 | 1985 |
| 3 | Max Zendejas | 21 | 1984 |
| | Gary Coston | 21 | 1986 |
| | Jason Bondzio | 21 | 2007 |

Single game
| Rank | Player | FGs | Year | Opponent |
|---|---|---|---|---|
| 1 | Tyler Loop | 5 | 2024 | Texas Tech |
| 2 | Steve Hurley | 4 | 1968 | UTEP |
| | Charles Gorham | 4 | 1973 | Indiana |
| | Max Zendejas | 4 | 1983 | California |
| | Max Zendejas | 4 | 1984 | LSU |
| | Max Zendejas | 4 | 1985 | Washington State |
| | Doug Pfaff | 4 | 1989 | Stanford |
| | Alex Zendejas | 4 | 2009 | Central Michigan |
| | Alex Zendejas | 4 | 2009 | Washington |
| | Casey Skowron | 4 | 2014 | UTSA |

=== Field goal percentage ===
Career
| Rank | Player | FG% | Years |
|---|---|---|---|
| 1 | Tyler Loop | 83.8% | 2020 2021 2022 2023 2024 |
| 2 | Jason Bondzio | 83.3% | 2007 2008 |
| 3 | Casey Skowron | 76.0% | 2014 2015 |
| 4 | Alex Zendejas | 74.4% | 2008 2009 2010 2011 |
| 5 | Max Zendejas | 73.8% | 1982 1983 1984 1985 |

Single season
| Rank | Player | FG% | Year |
|---|---|---|---|
| 1 | Tyler Loop | 100% | 2021 |
| 2 | Jason Bondzio | 87.5% | 2008 |
| 3 | Lucas Havrisik | 85.7% | 2020 |
| | Tyler Loop | 85.7% | 2022 |
| 4 | Casey Skowron | 81.8% | 2015 |
| 5 | Josh Pollack | 81.3% | 2018 |
| 6 | Max Zendejas | 80.0% | 1983 |
