= List of Arizona Wildcats in the NFL draft =

This is a list of Arizona Wildcats football players in the NFL draft.

== Key ==
B	Back	K	Kicker	NT	Nose tackle
C	Center	LB	Linebacker	FB	Fullback
DB	Defensive back	P	Punter	HB	Halfback
DE	Defensive end	QB	Quarterback	WR	Wide receiver
DT	Defensive tackle	RB	Running back	G	Guard
E	End	T	Offensive tackle	TE	Tight end

== Selections ==
Year	Round	Pick	Player	Team	Position
1939	1	10	Walt Nielsen	New York Giants	B
1939	15	139	Tom Greenfield	Green Bay Packers	C
1941	13	120	Roy Conn	Washington Redskins	T
1941	15	136	Johnny Black	New York Giants	B
1941	21	191	Jack Dungan	New York Giants	T
1942	6	47	Henry Stanton	Brooklyn Dodgers	E
1942	9	75	Emil Banjavic	Detroit Lions	B
1943	9	71	Jack Irish	Detroit Lions	T
1943	21	194	Bob Coutchie	Brooklyn Dodgers	E
1943	32	297	Bob Ruman	Pittsburgh Steelers	B
1946	18	166	Boyd Morse	Green Bay Packers	E
1948	7	47	Fred Enke	Detroit Lions	B
1948	16	138	Art Pollard	Washington Redskins	B
1948	28	258	Don Corbitt	Washington Redskins	C
1948	30	280	Hilliard Crum	Los Angeles Rams	E
1949	9	87	Johnny Smith	Los Angeles Rams	E
1949	12	118	Harry Varner	Washington Redskins	T
1950	19	246	John Smith	Los Angeles Rams	E
1950	28	361	Charley Hall	San Francisco 49ers	B
1951	18	214	Eddie Wolgast	Detroit Lions	B
1952	23	273	Bill Glazier	San Francisco 49ers	E
1953	20	238	Dick Christiansen	New York Giants	E
1955	22	262	Ernie Lewis	Philadelphia Eagles	G
1956	4	47	John Mellekas	Chicago Bears	T
1956	12	140	Max Burnett	Green Bay Packers	B
1956	19	219	Pete Arrigoni	San Francisco 49ers	B
1957	30	356	Art Luppino	Washington Redskins	B
1958	15	174	Jack Davis	Washington Redskins	G
1958	19	228	Ed Brown	Cleveland Browns	G
1961	12	158	Walt Mince	Los Angeles Rams	B
1962	2	15	Joe Hernandez	Washington Redskins	B
1962	2	24	Eddie Watson	Detroit Lions	QB
1962	3	38	Bobby Thompson	Detroit Lions	RB
1964	9	123	John Briscoe	Cleveland Browns	LB
1965	9	119	Floyd Hudlow	Philadelphia Eagles	B
1965	13	175	John Fouse	Philadelphia Eagles	E
1966	11	157	Darrell Hoover	Los Angeles Rams	RB
1968	1	26	Bill Lueck	Green Bay Packers	G
1968	3	82	Paul Robinson	Cincinnati Bengals	RB
1968	11	274	Wally Scott	Cincinnati Bengals	DB
1968	12	310	Ed Caruthers	Detroit Lions	DB
1968	17	442	Bill Nemeth	Miami Dolphins	C
1969	9	222	Joe Aluise	Chicago Bears	RB
1970	4	99	Ricky Stevenson	Cleveland Browns	DB
1970	6	148	Ron Gardin	Baltimore Colts	DB
1970	11	270	Gary Klahr	New Orleans Saints	LB
1971	6	145	Bill McKinley	Buffalo Bills	DE
1971	13	318	John Eggold	New York Jets	DE
1971	14	347	Willie Lewis	Chicago Bears	RB
1971	14	355	Doug Klausen	St. Louis Cardinals	T
1972	2	32	Mark Arneson	St. Louis Cardinals	LB
1972	2	52	Charles McKee	Dallas Cowboys	WR
1972	9	226	Larry McKee	Cleveland Browns	G
1972	16	391	Brian Linstrom	Buffalo Bills	QB
1973	2	34	Jackie Wallace	Minnesota Vikings	DB
1973	3	67	Bob Crum	Cleveland Browns	DE
1973	5	121	Bob McCall	Cincinnati Bengals	RB
1973	6	134	Marty Shuford	New Orleans Saints	RB
1973	11	284	Bob White	Pittsburgh Steelers	DB
1973	12	307	Jim Arneson	Dallas Cowboys	G
1973	14	364	Greg Boyd	Miami Dolphins	RB
1974	15	380	Ransom Terrell	Cleveland Browns	LB
1975	8	200	Mitch Hoopes	Dallas Cowboys	P
1975	9	225	Rousell Williams	Denver Broncos	DB
1975	11	267	Vince Phason	San Diego Chargers	DB
1975	13	319	Jim Upchurch	New Orleans Saints	RB
1975	15	382	Willie Hamilton	Dallas Cowboys	RB
1976	1	22	Mike Dawson	St. Louis Cardinals	DT
1976	4	120	Theo Bell	Pittsburgh Steelers	WR
1976	6	171	Scott Piper	Buffalo Bills	WR
1976	13	354	Brian Murray	Cleveland Browns	T
1976	16	445	Dennis Anderson	Kansas City Chiefs	P
1977	11	296	Charles Nash	Cleveland Browns	WR
1977	11	306	Keith Hartwig	Minnesota Vikings	WR
1980	2	54	Cleveland Crosby	Cleveland Browns	DE
1980	5	111	Mark Streeter	Detroit Lions	DB
1980	6	164	Larry Heater	Kansas City Chiefs	RB
1981	3	66	Robert Cobb	Los Angeles Rams	DE
1981	4	92	Mike Robinson	Cleveland Browns	DE
1981	10	275	Hubert Oliver	Philadelphia Eagles	RB
1981	11	296	Marcellus Greene	Los Angeles Rams	DB
1982	11	297	Bob Carter	Kansas City Chiefs	WR
1982	11	298	Frank Kalil	Buffalo Bills	G
1982	11	306	Gary Gibson	San Francisco 49ers	LB
1983	7	189	Chris Schultz	Dallas Cowboys	T
1983	9	240	Mark Keel	New England Patriots	TE
1983	9	246	Al Gross	Dallas Cowboys	DB
1984	1	7	Ricky Hunley	Cincinnati Bengals	LB
1984	4	89	Randy Robbins	Denver Broncos	DB
1984	6	162	John Kaiser	Seattle Seahawks	LB
1984	8	212	Brad Anderson	Chicago Bears	WR
1984	9	245	Chris Brewer	Denver Broncos	RB
1984	12	324	Byron Nelson	New Orleans Saints	T
1984	2	32	Darryl Goodlow	Philadelphia Eagles	LB
1985	2	31	Vance Johnson	Denver Broncos	WR
1985	9	233	Joe Drake	Philadelphia Eagles	DT
1985	10	277	John Conner	Seattle Seahawks	QB
1985	11	308	David Wood	San Francisco 49ers	DE
1986	4	100	Max Zendejas	Dallas Cowboys	K
1986	12	317	Allan Durden	Detroit Lions	DB
1987	4	93	Byron Evans	Philadelphia Eagles	LB
1987	5	131	Ruben Rodriguez	Seattle Seahawks	P
1987	6	148	Danny Lockett	Detroit Lions	LB
1987	8	197	Stan Mataele	Tampa Bay Buccaneers	DT
1987	9	248	Alfred Jenkins	Washington Redskins	RB
1987	11	288	Chris McLemore	Oakland Raiders	RB
1987	12	309	David Adams	Indianapolis Colts	RB
1988	4	89	Chuck Cecil	Green Bay Packers	DB
1988	11	293	George Hinkle	San Diego Chargers	DT
1989	2	44	Joe Tofflemire	Seattle Seahawks	C
1989	3	61	Derek Hill	Pittsburgh Steelers	WR
1989	4	105	Brad Henke	New York Giants	DT
1989	4	111	Rob Woods	Cincinnati Bengals	T
1990	1	8	Chris Singleton	New England Patriots	LB
1990	1	11	Anthony Smith	Oakland Raiders	DE
1990	3	69	Glenn Parker	Buffalo Bills	T
1990	6	154	John Nies	Buffalo Bills	P
1990	10	250	Donnie Salum	Atlanta Falcons	LB
1991	2	38	Darryll Lewis	Houston Oilers	DB
1991	12	318	Zeno Alexander	Detroit Lions	LB
1992	1	27	John Fina	Buffalo Bills	T
1992	6	150	Michael Bates	Seattle Seahawks	WR
1993	3	63	Ty Parten	Cincinnati Bengals	DT
1993	5	138	Rich Griffith	New England Patriots	TE
1993	6	155	Darryl Morrison	Washington Redskins	DB
1993	7	173	Keshon Johnson	Chicago Bears	DB
1994	2	38	Chuck Levy	Arizona Cardinals	RB
1994	5	156	Rob Waldrop	Kansas City Chiefs	DT
1994	5	157	Roderick Lewis	Houston Oilers	TE
1994	6	177	Brant Boyer	Miami Dolphins	LB
1995	3	82	Steve McLaughlin	St. Louis Rams	K
1995	3	83	Sean Harris	Chicago Bears	LB
1995	5	140	Mike Scurlock	St. Louis Rams	DB
1995	6	174	Hicham El-Mashtoub	Houston Oilers	C
1996	3	86	Tedy Bruschi	New England Patriots	LB
1996	7	222	Chuck Osborne	St. Louis Rams	DT
1997	3	63	Frank Middleton	Tampa Bay Buccaneers	G
1997	7	216	Armon Williams	Houston Oilers	LB
1998	4	107	Joe Salave'a	Houston Oilers	DT
1998	7	205	Jimmy Sprotte	Houston Oilers	LB
1998	7	208	Chester Burnett	Minnesota Vikings	LB
1999	1	10	Chris McAlister	Baltimore Ravens	DB
1999	4	129	Edwin Mulitalo	Baltimore Ravens	G
1999	5	168	Yusuf Scott	Arizona Cardinals	G
1999	7	229	Mike Lucky	Dallas Cowboys	TE
2000	1	31	Trung Canidate	St. Louis Rams	RB
2000	2	32	Dennis Northcutt	Cleveland Browns	WR
2000	4	116	Marcus Bell	Seattle Seahawks	LB
2000	7	207	Manuia Savea	Cleveland Browns	G
2000	7	251	DaShon Polk	Buffalo Bills	LB
2001	4	129	Brandon Manumaleuna	St. Louis Rams	TE
2001	7	234	Joe Tafoya	Tampa Bay Buccaneers	DE
2003	3	68	Lance Briggs	Chicago Bears	LB
2003	5	139	Bobby Wade	Chicago Bears	WR
2003	6	208	Makoa Freitas	Indianapolis Colts	T
2006	7	230	Kili Lefotu	Washington Redskins	G
2007	2	50	Chris Henry	Tennessee Titans	RB
2007	6	178	Nick Folk	Dallas Cowboys	K
2007	7	224	Michael Johnson	New York Giants	DB
2007	7	234	Syndric Steptoe	Cleveland Browns	WR
2008	1	27	Antoine Cason	San Diego Chargers	DB
2008	6	183	Spencer Larsen	Denver Broncos	LB
2008	7	212	Wilrey Fontenot	Atlanta Falcons	DB
2008	7	245	Lionel Dotson	Miami Dolphins	DT
2009	2	39	Eben Britton	Jacksonville Jaguars	T
2009	4	107	Mike Thomas	Jacksonville Jaguars	WR
2010	2	42	Rob Gronkowski	New England Patriots	TE
2010	3	81	Earl Mitchell	Houston Texans	DT
2011	2	42	Brooks Reed	Houston Texans	DE
2011	6	197	Ricky Elmore	Green Bay Packers	DE
2011	7	215	D'Aundre Reed	Minnesota Vikings	DE
2012	3	88	Nick Foles	Philadelphia Eagles	QB
2012	5	168	Juron Criner	Oakland Raiders	WR
2012	7	245	Trevin Wade	Cleveland Browns	DB
2014	4	117	Ka'Deem Carey	Chicago Bears	RB
2014	5	157	Shaquille Richardson	Pittsburgh Steelers	DB
2014	6	212	Marquis Flowers	Cincinnati Bengals	LB
2016	6	219	Will Parks	Denver Broncos	DB
2016	7	250	Scooby Wright	Cleveland Browns	LB
2018	5	152	Dane Cruikshank	Tennessee Titans	DB
2019	7	229	P. J. Johnson	Detroit Lions	DT
2021	6	194	Roy Lopez	Houston Texans	DT
2021	6	195	Gary Brightwell	New York Giants	RB
2024	1	25	Jordan Morgan	Green Bay Packers	T
2024	4	135	Jacob Cowing	San Francisco 49ers	WR
2024	6	194	Tanner McLachlan	Cincinnati Bengals	TE
2025	1	8	Tetairoa McMillan	Carolina Panthers	WR
2025	2	37	Jonah Savaiinaea	Miami Dolphins	G
2025	6	186	Tyler Loop	Baltimore Ravens	K
2025	7	245	Jacory Croskey-Merritt	Washington Commanders	RB
2026	2	38	Treydan Stukes	Las Vegas Raiders	DB
2026	4	131	Genesis Smith	Los Angeles Chargers	DB
2026	5	150	Dalton Johnson	Las Vegas Raiders	DB
2026	7	255	Michael Dansby	Seattle Seahawks	DB
