= Tetairoa McMillan =

American football player (born 2003)

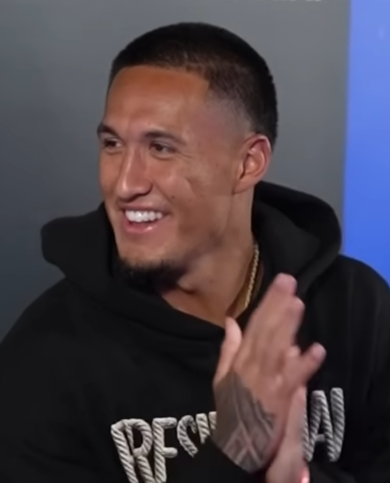
- McMillan in 2026

No. 4 – Carolina Panthers
- Position: Wide receiver
- Roster status: Active

Personal information
- Born: April 5, 2003 (age 23); Waimānalo, Hawaii, U.S.
- Listed height: 6 ft 5 in (1.96 m)
- Listed weight: 220 lb (100 kg)

Career information
- High school: Servite (Anaheim, California)
- College: Arizona (2022–2024)
- NFL draft: 2025: 1st round, 8th overall pick

Career history
- Carolina Panthers (2025–present)

Awards and highlights
- NFL Offensive Rookie of the Year (2025); PFWA All-Rookie Team (2025); Polynesian College Football Player of the Year (2024); Consensus All-American (2024); First-team All-Big 12 (2024); Second-team All-Pac-12 (2023)

Career NFL statistics as of Week 10, 2026
- Receptions: 119
- Receiving yards: 1,674
- Receiving touchdowns: 10
- Stats at Pro Football Reference

Tetairoa McMillan (/tɛtaɪˈroʊə/ teh-ty-ROH-ə; born April 5, 2003), nicknamed "T-Mac", is an American professional football wide receiver for the Carolina Panthers of the National Football League (NFL). McMillan played college football for the Arizona Wildcats, earning Polynesian College Football Player of the Year honors in 2024. He was selected by the Panthers eighth overall in the 2025 NFL draft and was named the Offensive Rookie of the Year.

== Early life ==
McMillan was born on April 5, 2003, in Waimānalo, Hawaii, later moving with his family to Southern California at the age of one. He attended Servite High School in Anaheim, California. As a senior, he was a finalist for the Gatorade Football Player of the Year after he had 88 receptions for 1,302 yards and 18 touchdowns. For his career, he had 179 receptions for 2,640 yards and 34 touchdowns. McMillan was selected to play in the 2022 All-American Bowl. In 2021, McMillan also won the Polynesian High School Football Player of the Year Award. A five-star recruit, he originally committed to the University of Oregon to play college football before flipping to the University of Arizona, joining high school teammates Noah Fifita, Jacob Manu, and Keyan Burnett. McMillan was the highest rated recruit in the history of the school.

== College career ==
McMillan earned immediate playing time his true freshman year at Arizona in 2022. In his collegiate debut, he had three receptions for 53 yards and a touchdown in the 38–20 victory over San Diego State. On October 15 against Washington, he had seven catches for 132 yards and two touchdowns in the 49–39 loss. McMillan finished the season leading all true freshmen nationally with 702 receiving yards and eight touchdowns on 39 receptions.

In 2023, McMillan had a breakout season with 90 receptions for 1,402 yards (fifth-most in the nation) and ten touchdowns over 13 games. He caught two touchdowns in a 31–24 loss to No. 7 Washington and followed with a 141-yard performance against No. 9 USC. In a 42–18 win over No. 22 Utah, McMillan had 116 receiving yards, a touchdown, and threw his first career touchdown pass. Against Arizona State, he caught 11 passes for 266 yards and two touchdowns, setting a new Territorial Cup receiving yards record as the Wildcats won 59–23. He was named a third-team AP All-American at the end of the regular season. In the 2023 Alamo Bowl against No. 12 Oklahoma, McMillan had ten receptions for 160 yards for Arizona as they won 38–24, finishing the season on a seven-game winning streak.

After head coach Jedd Fisch left Arizona to take the Washington head coaching job, McMillan elected to remain at Arizona for the 2024 season. Prior to the season, McMillan was named a preseason first-team AP All-American and was a projected first-round pick in the 2025 NFL draft. In the Wildcats' opening game of the 2024 season against New Mexico, McMillan caught ten passes for a school-record 304 yards and tied the school record with four touchdown catches in a 61–39 victory. Two weeks later, he posted a career-high 11 receptions for 138 yards in a loss to No. 14 Kansas State. In a loss to West Virginia, he finished with ten receptions for 202 yards and a touchdown. He finished the season third in the nation with 1,319 yards on 84 receptions and was named a 2024 Consensus All-American. He was also a finalist for the Fred Biletnikoff Award, losing to Travis Hunter.

Following his junior season, McMillan declared for the 2025 NFL draft, finishing his college career with 213 receptions, 3,423 receiving yards, and 26 touchdowns in three seasons. His 3,423 yards are the most in Wildcats program history, and his receptions and touchdowns rank in the top five in school history.

== Professional career ==
Pre-draft measurables
Height	Weight	Arm length	Hand span	Wingspan	40-yard dash	10-yard split	20-yard split
6 ft 4 1/8 in (1.93 m)	219 lb (99 kg)	31 1/2 in (0.80 m)	10 in (0.25 m)	6 ft 5 7/8 in (1.98 m)	4.53 s	1.58 s	2.62 s
All values from NFL Combine/Pro Day

McMillan was selected in the first round with the eighth overall pick by the Carolina Panthers in the 2025 NFL draft. He became the highest-selected offensive player in Arizona Wildcats history and tied for the second-highest pick overall in the program’s history, behind Ricky Hunley. On May 9, McMillan signed his four-year, $27.93 million rookie contract with the Panthers.

In week 6, he recorded three receptions for 29 yards and two receiving touchdowns which earned him NFL Rookie of the Week. In his rookie season, McMillan led the Panthers with 70 catches for 1,014 yards and seven touchdowns, which led all rookie wide receivers. He set the Panther's franchise record for most receiving yards by a rookie in a season. He was named to the PFWA NFL All-Rookie Team for the 2025 season. He won Offensive Rookie of the Year Award joining Cam Newton as the only Panthers to win the award. McMillan was ranked 87th by his fellow players on the NFL Top 100 Players of 2026.

In Week 4 of the 2026 season, McMillan recorded 14 catches for 192 yards and two touchdowns in a 32-26 win over the Detroit Lions, earning NFC Offensive Player of the Week.

== Career statistics ==
=== NFL ===
==== Regular season ====
Year	Team	Games		Receiving					Fumbles	
Year	Team	GP	GS	Rec	Yds	Avg	Lng	TD	Fum	Lost
2025	CAR	17	17	70	1,014	14.5	43	7	1	1
2026	CAR	9	8	49	660	13.5	32	3	2	1
Career		26	25	119	1,674	14.1	43	10	3	2

==== Postseason ====
Year	Team	Games		Receiving					Fumbles	
Year	Team	GP	GS	Rec	Yds	Avg	Lng	TD	Fum	Lost
2025	CAR	1	1	5	81	16.2	22	0	0	0
Career		1	1	5	81	16.2	22	0	0	0

=== College ===
Season	Team	Games		Receiving				
Season	Team	GP	GS	Rec	Yds	Avg	YPG	TD
2022	Arizona	12	8	39	702	18.0	58.5	8
2023	Arizona	13	13	90	1,402	15.6	107.8	10
2024	Arizona	12	12	84	1,319	15.7	109.9	8
Career		37	33	213	3,423	16.1	92.5	26

== Personal life ==
McMillan is a Christian.

McMillan is of Native Hawaiian descent.

He is a supporter of Hui Mahi’ai ‘Āina, a nonprofit homeless shelter founded by his grandmother, and the First Down Faith Foundation.

In February 2026, McMillan faced controversy after appearing on Streamer Bowl VII, a charity esports tournament. McMillan was competing against other streamers in a Madden NFL game when he was recorded using a racial slur twice. He later apologized for the incident on Instagram, posting a statement saying "Yesterday, while on live stream, I used a term I should not have. There's no excuse for what I said–I sincerely apologize for speaking thoughtlessly and will do better.''
