= List of Arizona Wildcats bowl games =

The Arizona Wildcats college football team competes as part of the National Collegiate Athletic Association (NCAA) Division I Football Bowl Subdivision (FBS), representing the University of Arizona in the South Division of the Pac-12 Conference (Pac-12). Since the establishment of the team in 1893, Arizona has appeared in 23 bowl games and had 10 wins, 12 losses, and 1 tie for a .457 winning percentage. The Wildcats played in two Bowl Coalition Era Bowls. The 1992 John Handcock Bowl (Sun Bowl) was a Tier 2 Bowl Coalition game. The 1993 Fiesta Bowl was a Tier 1 Bowl Coalition game. The December 2014 Fiesta Bowl was part of the CFP/New Year's Six system.

== Key ==
General
†	Bowl game record attendance
‡	Former bowl game record attendance
*	Denotes BC/BA/BCS/CFP Game

Results
W	Win
L	Loss

== Post-season games ==
List of bowl games showing bowl played in, score, date, season, opponent, stadium, location, attendance and head coach (Note: Statistics correct as of 2014–15 NCAA football bowl games.)
#	Bowl	Score (Note: Results are sortable first by whether the result was an Arizona win, loss or tie and then second by the margin of victory.)	Date	Season (Note: Links to the season article for the Arizona team that competed in the bowl for that year.)	Opponent (Note: Links to the season article for the opponent that Arizona competed against in the bowl for that year when available or to their general page when unavailable.)	Stadium	Location	Attendance	Head coach
1	San Diego East-West Christmas Classic	L 0–38	December 26, 1921	1921	Centre Praying Colonels	Balboa Stadium	San Diego	35,000^{‡}	Pop McKale
2	Salad Bowl	L 13–14	January 1, 1949	1948	Drake	Montgomery Stadium	Phoenix	43,000	Miles W. Casteel
3	Sun Bowl	L 10–34	December 28, 1968	1968	Auburn Tigers	Sun Bowl Stadium	El Paso	27,062	Darrell Mudra
4	Fiesta Bowl	L 10–16	December 25, 1979	1979	Pittsburgh Panthers	Sun Devil Stadium	Tempe	30,333	Tony Mason
5	Sun Bowl	T 13–13	December 16, 1985	1985	Georgia Bulldogs	Sun Bowl Stadium	El Paso	30,333	Larry Smith
6	Aloha Bowl	W 30–21	December 28, 1986	1986	North Carolina Tar Heels	Aloha Stadium	Honolulu	30,333	Larry Smith
7	Copper Bowl	W 17–10	December 31, 1989	1989	North Carolina State Wolfpack	Arizona Stadium	Tucson	37,237	Dick Tomey
8	Aloha Bowl	L 0–28	December 25, 1990	1990	Syracuse Orangemen	Aloha Stadium	Honolulu	41,450	Dick Tomey
Bowl Coalition Era
9	Sun Bowl* (John Handcock Bowl) Tier 2 BC Game	L 15–20	December 31, 1992	1992	Baylor Bears	Sun Bowl Stadium	El Paso	31,337	Dick Tomey
10	Fiesta Bowl* Tier 1 BC Game	W 29–0	January 1, 1994	1993	Miami Hurricanes	Sun Devil Stadium	Tempe	31,337	Dick Tomey
11	Freedom Bowl	L 13–16	December 27, 1994	1994	Utah Utes	Anaheim Stadium	Anaheim	31,377	Dick Tomey
Bowl Alliance Era
12	Insight.com Bowl	W 20–14	December 20, 1997	1997	New Mexico Lobos	Arizona Stadium	Tucson	49,385^{‡}	Dick Tomey
Bowl Championship Series Era
13"	Holiday Bowl	W 23–20	December 30, 1998	1998	Nebraska Cornhuskers	Qualcomm Stadium	San Diego	65,354	Dick Tomey
14	Las Vegas Bowl	W 31–21	December 20, 2008	2008	BYU Cougars	Sam Boyd Stadium	Las Vegas	40,047	Mike Stoops
15	Holiday Bowl	L 0–33	December 30, 2009	2009	Nebraska Cornhuskers	Qualcomm Stadium	San Diego	64,607	Mike Stoops
16	Alamo Bowl	L 10–36	December 29, 2010	2010	Oklahoma State Cowboys	Alamodome	San Antonio	57,593	Mike Stoops
17	New Mexico Bowl	W 49–48	December 15, 2012	2012	Nevada Wolf Pack	University Stadium	Albuquerque	24,610	Rich Rodriguez
18	Independence Bowl	W 42–19	December 31, 2013	2013	Boston College Eagles	Independence Stadium	Shreveport	36,917	Rich Rodriguez
College Football Playoff Era
19	Fiesta Bowl* (CFP New Year's Six)	L 30–38	December 31, 2014	2014	Boise State Broncos	University of Phoenix Stadium	Glendale	66,896	Rich Rodriguez
20	New Mexico Bowl	W 45–37	December 19, 2015	2015	New Mexico Lobos	University Stadium (Albuquerque)	Albuquerque	30,289	Rich Rodriguez
21	Foster Farms Bowl	L 35–38	December 27, 2017	2017	Purdue Boilermakers	Levi's Stadium	Santa Clara	28,436	Rich Rodriguez
22	Alamo Bowl	W 38–24	December 28, 2023	2023	Oklahoma Sooners	Alamodome	San Antonio	55,853	Jedd Fisch
23	Holiday Bowl	L 19–24	January 2, 2026	2025	SMU Mustangs	Snapdragon Stadium	San Diego	30,602	Brent Brennan

== Record by bowl game and opponents ==
Bowl Name	#	Appearances	Record
Advocare V100	1	2013	1–0
Alamo Bowl	2	2010, 2023	1-1
Aloha Bowl	2	1986, 1990	1–1
Christmas Classic	1	1921	0–1
Insight.com Bowl/Copper Bowl/Cactus Bowl	2	1989, 1997	2–0
Fiesta Bowl	3	1979, 1993, 2014	1–2
Foster Farms Bowl	1	2017	0-1
Freedom Bowl	1	1994	0–1
Holiday Bowl	3	1998, 2009, 2025	1–2
Las Vegas Bowl	1	2008	1–0
New Mexico Bowl	2	2012, 2015	2–0
Salad Bowl	1	1949	0–1
Sun Bowl	3	1968, 1985, 1992	0–2–1

Opponents	#	Win	Loss	Tied	%
Auburn	1	0	1	0	.000
Baylor	1	0	1	0	.000
Boise State	1	0	1	0	.000
Boston College	1	1	0	0	1.000
BYU	1	1	0	0	1.000
Centre (D-III)	1	0	1	0	.000
Drake (FCS)	1	0	1	0	.000
Georgia	1	0	0	1	.500
Miami	1	1	0	0	1.000
Nebraska	2	1	1	0	.500
Nevada	1	1	0	0	1.000
New Mexico	2	2	0	0	1.000
North Carolina	1	1	0	0	1.000
North Carolina State	1	1	0	0	1.000
Oklahoma State	1	0	1	0	.000
Pittsburgh	1	0	1	0	.000
Purdue	1	0	1	0	.000
SMU	1	0	1	0	.000
Syracuse	1	0	1	0	.000
Utah	1	0	1	0	.000
Oklahoma	1	1	0	0	1.000
