= 2009 Arizona Wildcats football team =

American college football season

2009 Arizona Wildcats football

Holiday Bowl vs. Nebraska, L 0–33
- Conference: Pacific-10 Conference
- Record: 8–5 (6–3 Pac-10)
- Head coach: Mike Stoops (6th season)
- Offensive coordinator: Sonny Dykes (3rd season)
- Offensive scheme: Air raid
- Defensive coordinator: Mark Stoops (6th season)
- Base defense: 4–3
- Home stadium: Arizona Stadium

Uniform

2009 Pacific-10 Conference football standings
	Conf.			Overall
Team	W		L	W		L
No. 11 Oregon $	8	–	1	10	–	3
Arizona	6	–	3	8	–	5
Oregon State	6	–	3	8	–	5
Stanford	6	–	3	8	–	5
No. 22 USC	5	–	4	9	–	4
California	5	–	4	8	–	5
Washington	4	–	5	5	–	7
UCLA	3	–	6	7	–	6
Arizona State	2	–	7	4	–	8
Washington State	0	–	9	1	–	11
$ – BCS representative as conference champion; Rankings from AP Poll

The 2009 Arizona Wildcats football team represented the University of Arizona in the 2009 NCAA Division I FBS college football season. The Wildcats, led by sixth-year head coach Mike Stoops, played their home games at Arizona Stadium.

Arizona hosted Central Michigan of the Mid-American Conference to begin the season on September 5, 2009 (with a 19–6 win), and ended the regular season with a 21–17 win over perennial conference power, then-ranked #20 Southern California on December 5, 2009; this was the first victory over USC by the Wildcats in the Mike Stoops era.

In addition to the slate of nine conference games, four at home and five on the road, the Wildcats traveled to Iowa City, Iowa and lost to the Iowa Hawkeyes of the Big Ten (who eventually finished with a #10 AP Poll ranking and an invitation to the Orange Bowl), and hosted in-state sister school Northern Arizona of the Big Sky Conference the preceding week.

After posting an 8–4 regular season record (6–3 in the Pac-10, good for a second-place tie in the conference with Oregon State and Stanford), the Wildcats were invited to appear in the 2009 Holiday Bowl in San Diego, the second consecutive postseason bowl game for the Arizona football program under Stoops. The Wildcats were shut out 33–0 by Nebraska.

The Wildcats finished the regular season with an Associated Press poll ranking of #22, their first national ranking since the 2000 season.

== Schedule ==
Date	Time	Opponent	Rank	Site	TV	Result	Attendance
September 5	7:00 p.m.	Central Michigan*		Arizona Stadium; Tucson, Arizona		W 19–6	51,683
September 12	7:00 p.m.	Northern Arizona*		Arizona Stadium; Tucson, Arizona	KGUN	W 34–17	50,623
September 19	12:30 p.m.	at Iowa*		Kinnick Stadium; Iowa City, Iowa	ABC	L 17–27	70,585
September 26	5:30 p.m.	at Oregon State		Reser Stadium; Corvallis, Oregon	Versus	W 37–32	42,119
October 10	8:00 p.m.	at Washington		Husky Stadium; Seattle	FSN	L 33–36	61,621
October 17	4:30 p.m.	Stanford		Arizona Stadium; Tucson, Arizona	Versus	W 43–38	53,479
October 24	3:30 p.m.	UCLA	No. 22	Arizona Stadium; Tucson, Arizona	FSN	W 27–13	51,440
November 7	1:30 p.m.	Washington State^{†}	No. 18	Arizona Stadium; Tucson, Arizona	FSN	W 48–7	50,242
November 14	4:00 p.m.	at California	No. 17	Memorial Stadium; Berkeley, California	Versus	L 16–24	53,347
November 21	6:00 p.m.	No. 11 Oregon		Arizona Stadium; Tucson, Arizona (College GameDay)	ABC	L 41–44 ^{2OT}	57,813
November 28	1:30 p.m.	at Arizona State		Sun Devil Stadium; Tempe, Arizona (Territorial Cup)	ABC	W 20–17	55,989
December 5	1:30 p.m.	at No. 18 USC		Los Angeles Memorial Coliseum; Los Angeles	ABC	W 21–17	83,753
December 31	6:00 p.m.	vs. No. 22 Nebraska*	No. 20	Qualcomm Stadium; San Diego (Holiday Bowl)	ESPN	L 0–33	64,607
*Non-conference game; ^{†}Homecoming; Rankings from AP Poll and BCS Rankings after October 18 released prior to game; All times are in Mountain time

Schedule source: 2009 Arizona Wildcats football schedule and Arizona Official Athletic Site.

== Rankings ==
Ranking movements Legend: ██ Increase in ranking ██ Decrease in ranking — = Not ranked RV = Received votes
	Week															
Poll	Pre	1	2	3	4	5	6	7	8	9	10	11	12	13	14	Final
AP	RV	RV	RV	—	—	RV	RV	RV	23	21	18	RV	RV	RV	22	RV
Coaches	RV	RV	RV	—	RV	RV	—	RV	24	19	19	RV	RV	RV	23	RV
Harris	Not released				RV	RV	—	RV	25	21	18	RV	RV	RV	24	Not released
BCS	Not released							22	20	18	17	—	—	—	20	Not released

== Game summaries ==
=== vs Central Michigan ===
Central Michigan Chippewas (0–0) vs Arizona Wildcats (0–0) – Game summary

Quarter	1	2	3	4	Total
Chippewas	0	0	0	6	6
Wildcats	6	7	3	3	19

at Arizona Stadium • Tucson, AZ

- Date: September 5, 2009
- Game time: 7:00 p.m.
- Game weather: Cloudy, 84 °F (29 °C)
- Game attendance: 51,683
- Referee: Jack Folliard

Game information

First quarter

- (7:17) ARIZ – Alex Zendejas 36-yard field goal (Drive: 7 plays, 28 yards, 2:59; Arizona 3–0)
- (0:00) ARIZ – Alex Zendejas 37-yard field goal (Drive: 4 plays, 7 yards, 0:58; Arizona 6–0)

Second quarter

- (8:20) ARIZ – Nic Grigsby 3-yard run, Alex Zendejas kick (Drive: 9 plays, 63 yards, 1:37; Arizona 13–0)

Third quarter

- (0:38) ARIZ – Alex Zendejas 37-yard field goal (Drive: 12 plays, 79 yards, 5:20; Arizona 16–0)

Fourth quarter

- (12:21) CMU – Dan LeFevour 5-yard run, two-point run failed (Drive: 9 plays, 73 yards, 3:11; Arizona 16–6)
- (8:45) ARIZ – Alex Zendejas 35-yard field goal (Drive: 6 plays, 40 yards, 3:27; Arizona 19–6)

Statistics	CMU	ARIZ
First downs	11	24
Total yards	182	448
Rushing yards	20–74	46–246
Passing yards	252	434
Passing: Comp–Att–Int	18–31–1	19–30–1
Time of possession	22:08	37:45

Team	Category	Player	Statistics
Central Michigan	Passing	Dan LeFevour	18/31, 108 yards, INT
Central Michigan	Rushing	Antonio Brown	3 carries, 31 yards
Central Michigan	Receiving	Kito Poblah	6 receptions, 47 yards
Arizona	Passing	Matt Scott	19/30, 202 yards, INT
Arizona	Rushing	Nic Grigsby	23 carries, 118 yards, TD
Arizona	Receiving	Terrell Turner	6 receptions, 55 yards

The Wildcats’ season began following a 43-minute lightning delay, the second straight year the Arizona season opener was delayed by lightning.

Central Michigan was flagged for a false start on its first play from scrimmage. After a short completion and a trap-play run, CMU quarterback Dan LeFevour was intercepted by LB Vuni Tuihamalaka at the Chippewas’ 31, but the Wildcats, on their third play from scrimmage (in the person of WR Bug Wright) coughed up the ball at CMU's 16. The UA forced Central Michigan to go three-and-out on its second drive, then drove to score.

The 'Cats forced a second turnover just before the end of the quarter. Linebacker C.J. Parish drilled CMU's Antonio Brown on a punt return, forcing the ball loose. UA longsnapper Jason Bertoni, who started his career at Central Michigan (before leaving the Chippewa program in 2007 for personal reasons), recovered at CMU's 28.

The Wildcats gained seven yards on three plays, setting up a 37-yard Alex Zendejas field goal. Zendejas hit a total of four field goals in his first college start.

Arizona's first touchdown of the season came midway through the second quarter.

Freshman QB Matt Scott led the Wildcats on a nine-play, 63-yard drive. RB Nic Grigsby capped it with a three-yard run up the middle. Zendejas’ PAT made it a 13-point lead.

Central Michigan was hampered by the quickness of the Arizona defense and didn't score until there were 12 minutes 21 seconds remaining in the game; even then, the team failed to convert on a two-point conversion that would have made it a one-possession game.

Scott completed 10 of 17 first-half passes for 110 yards. Sophomore QB Nick Foles did not play a snap in the entire game. TE Rob Gronkowski, a key offensive weapon for Arizona in 2008 and speculated to be a future top NFL draft pick, did not play in the opener because of a back injury.

=== vs Northern Arizona ===
Northern Arizona Lumberjacks (0–0) vs Arizona Wildcats (1–0) – Game summary

Quarter	1	2	3	4	Total
Lumberjacks	3	7	0	7	17
Wildcats	14	7	6	7	34

at Arizona Stadium • Tucson, AZ

- Date: September 12, 2009
- Game time: 7:00 p.m.
- Game weather: Partly cloudy, 88 °F (31 °C)
- Game attendance: 50,623
- Referee: Larry Farina
- TV announcers (KGUN): Dave Sitton (play-by-play), John Fina (analyst), Glenn Howell (sideline reporter)

Game information

First quarter

- (11:19) ARIZ – Nic Grigsby 25-yard run, Alex Zendejas kick (Drive: 8 plays, 80 yards, 3:41; Arizona 7–0)
- (9:10) NAU – Matt Myers 43-yard field goal (Drive: 4 plays, 9 yards, 1:58; Arizona 7–3)
- (5:39) ARIZ – Nic Grigsby 30-yard run, Alex Zendejas kick (Drive: 7 plays, 68 yards, 3:24; Arizona 14–3)

Second quarter

- (14:16) NAU – Ed Berry 4-yard pass from Michael Herrick, Matt Myers kick (Drive: 14 plays, 79 yards, 6:17; Arizona 14–10)
- (0:30) ARIZ – Terrell Turner 2-yard pass from Matt Scott, Alex Zendejas kick (Drive: 17 plays, 99 yards, 7:40; Arizona 21–10)

Third quarter

- (10:07) ARIZ – Keola Antolin 1-yard run, kick failed (Drive: 2 plays, 95 yards, 0:39; Arizona 27–10)

Fourth quarter

- (14:10) ARIZ – Juron Criner 5-yard pass from Nick Foles, Alex Zendejas kick (Drive: 11 plays, 57 yards, 5:24; Arizona 34–10)
- (8:07) NAU – Ed Berry 19-yard pass from Michael Herrick, Matt Myers kick (Drive: 1 play, 19 yards, 0:09; Arizona 34–17)

Statistics	NAU	ARIZ
First downs	13	27
Total yards	226	559
Rushing yards	19–67	47–365
Passing yards	159	194
Passing: Comp–Att–Int	20–30–2	20–28–1
Time of possession	24:08	35:52

Team	Category	Player	Statistics
Northern Arizona	Passing	Michael Herrick	20/32, 159 yards, 2 TD, 2 INT
Northern Arizona	Rushing	Alex Henderson	14 carries, 56 yards
Northern Arizona	Receiving	Ed Berry	7 receptions, 71 yards, 2 TD
Arizona	Passing	Matt Scott	14/20, 150 yards, TD, INT
Arizona	Rushing	Nic Grigsby	15 carries, 207 yards, 2 TD
Arizona	Receiving	Terrell Turner	5 receptions, 46 yards, TD

The Wildcats were effective, if not totally crisp, in a 34–17 win over in-state rival Northern Arizona (NAU), a FCS (formerly Division I-AA) member of the Big Sky Conference.

Junior RB Nicolas Grigsby rushed for two touchdowns; Grigsby's two scores — a 25-yard run and a 30-yard run — helped pace the Wildcats through a sometimes-choppy first half in front of 50,623 at Arizona Stadium.

He was key to the Wildcats' final drive of the second quarter, an 18-play, 99-yard march. WR Terrell Turner gave the Wildcats a 21–10 lead with a 2-yard touchdown catch from starting QB Matt Scott, a play after WR Delashaun Dean hauled in a 23-yard grab. Dean was drilled by two NAU players at the end of the play, and had to be helped off the field. Scott then found Turner on a short pass to pad the Wildcats' lead.

Arizona added two scores in the second half to put the Lumberjacks away. Sophomore RB Keola Antolin punched in a 1-yard score on the first play following Grigsby's 94-yard run to give the Wildcats a 27–10 lead with 10 minutes left in the quarter.

Backup quarterback Nick Foles hit Juron Criner for a 5-yard touchdown pass on the second play of the fourth quarter to make it 34–10.

The Wildcats began emptying their bench midway through the third quarter. Foles entered the game with 7:15 remaining in the quarter, and drove the team about 40 yards before fumbling a snap and turning the ball over. CB Trevin Wade's second interception of the third quarter gave Arizona the ball back.

Arizona has not lost to NAU since 1937. All three of Arizona's state universities (Arizona, NAU and Arizona State) are obligated under state law to play one another in athletic contests each year.

=== at Iowa ===
Arizona Wildcats (2–0) at Iowa Hawkeyes (2–0) – Game summary

Quarter	1	2	3	4	Total
Wildcats	7	3	0	7	17
Hawkeyes	7	7	3	10	27

at Kinnick Stadium • Iowa City, IA

- Date: September 19, 2009
- Game time: 12:30 p.m.
- Game weather: Partly cloudy, 76 °F (24 °C)
- Game attendance: 70,585
- Referee: Dan Capron
- TV announcers (ABC): Mike Patrick (play by play), Craig James (analyst), Heather Cox (sideline reporter)

Game information

First quarter

- (10:49) IOWA – Adam Robinson 2-yard run, Daniel Murray kick (Drive: 10 plays, 75 yards, 4:11; Iowa 7–0)
- (6:57) ARIZ – Trevin Wade 38-yard interception return, Alex Zendejas kick (Tied 7–7)

Second quarter

- (9:55) ARIZ – Alex Zendejas 20-yard field goal (Drive: 7 plays, 60 yards, 2:17; Arizona 10–7)
- (6:28) IOWA – Adam Robinson 1-yard run, Daniel Murray kick (Drive: 6 plays, 70 yards, 3:27; Iowa 14–10)

Third quarter

- (1:47) IOWA – Daniel Murray 20-yard field goal (Drive: 7 plays, 44 yards, 3:19; Iowa 17–10)

Fourth quarter

- (14:52) IOWA – Daniel Murray 40-yard field goal (Drive: 4 plays, 6 yards, 0:52; Iowa 20–10)
- (4:40) IOWA – Brandon Wegher 2-yard run, Daniel Murray kick (Drive: 14 plays, 74 yards, 8:30; Iowa 27–10)
- (1:53) ARIZ – Juron Criner 10-yard pass from Nick Foles, Alex Zendejas kick (Drive: 9 plays, 63 yards, 2:47; Iowa 27–17)

Statistics	ARIZ	IOWA
First downs	8	19
Total yards	253	338
Rushing yards	25–148	42–133
Passing yards	231	228
Passing: Comp–Att–Int	10–26–1	20–32–1
Time of possession	22:04	37:56

Team	Category	Player	Statistics
Arizona	Passing	Nick Foles	6/11, 55 yards, TD
Arizona	Rushing	Nic Grigsby	11 carries, 75 yards
Arizona	Receiving	David Roberts	2 receptions, 44 yards
Iowa	Passing	Ricky Stanzi	20/32, 205 yards, INT
Iowa	Rushing	Adam Robinson	18 carries, 101 yards, TD
Iowa	Receiving	Marvin McNutt	2 receptions, 50 yards

The Hawkeyes scored on the opening drive, with a 2-yard touchdown run by Adam Robinson. But Arizona tied the score at 7 after Trevin Wade returned a Ricky Stanzi interception 38 yards into the end zone.

The Wildcats struggled with their few offensive chances.

QB Matt Scott missed a handful of open receivers in the third quarter, and — on a play that could have changed the momentum of the game — WR Delashaun Dean dropped what would have been a 50-yard gain. Dean appeared to trap the ball between his leg and the ground; a video replay rule confirmed that it was an incomplete pass.

Iowa's defense would again prove to be the difference-maker in this game, not allowing a touchdown until 1:53 was remaining in the game, with the Hawkeyes well ahead. Iowa safety Tyler Sash, with a grab of a Matt Scott pass intended for Terrell Turner, also netted his seventh interception in five games (dating back to last year).

Nick Foles came in at QB in the fourth quarter and went 6 for 11 with a 10-yard touchdown pass to Juron Criner, but, as noted above, the damage was already done.

The loss dropped Arizona to 0–7 against Big Ten teams in the last decade; the Wildcats’ last nonconference road win of any kind came in 2001, when John Mackovic's Wildcats defeated San Diego State.

=== at Oregon State ===
Arizona Wildcats (2–1) at Oregon State Beavers (2–1) – Game summary

Quarter	1	2	3	4	Total
Wildcats	7	7	14	9	37
Beavers	7	10	0	15	32

at Reser Stadium • Corvallis, OR

- Date: September 26, 2009
- Game time: 5:30 p.m.
- Game weather: Sunny, 79 °F (26 °C)
- Game attendance: 42,119
- Referee: Jack Wood
- TV announcers (Versus): Ron Thulin (play by play), Kelly Stouffer (analyst), Lewis Johnson (sideline reporter)

Game information

First quarter

- (6:25) ARIZ – Delashaun Dean 2-yard pass from Nick Foles, Alex Zendejas kick (Drive: 15 plays, 71 yards, 7:07; Arizona 7–0)
- (0:02) OSU – Damola Adeniji 11-yard pass from Sean Canfield, Justin Kahut kick (Drive: 14 plays, 83 yards, 6:15; Tied 7–7)

Second quarter

- (8:25) OSU – Jacquizz Rodgers 1-yard run, Justin Kahut kick (Drive: 11 plays, 71 yards, 4:57; Oregon State 14–7)
- (3:39) ARIZ – Greg Nwoko 19-yard run, Alex Zendejas kick (Drive: 9 plays, 74 yards, 4:39; Tied 14–14)
- (0:00) OSU – Justin Kahut 22-yard field goal (Drive: 7 plays, 41 yards, 0:57; Oregon State 17–14)

Third quarter

- (6:21) ARIZ – Nick Foles 1-yard run, Alex Zendejas kick (Drive: 7 plays, 47 yards, 3:28; Arizona 21–17)
- (1:48) ARIZ – Juron Criner 3-yard pass from Nick Foles, Alex Zendejas kick (Drive: 4 plays, 80 yards, 1:36; Arizona 28–17)

Fourth quarter

- (13:44) OSU – Jacquizz Rodgers 2-yard run, James Rodgers run for two-point conversion (Drive: 9 plays, 65 yards, 2:58; Arizona 28–25)
- (8:08) ARIZ – Terrell Turner 13-yard pass from Nick Foles, Alex Zendejas kick (Drive: 5 plays, 45 yards, 2:04; Arizona 35–25)
- (4:09) OSU – Aaron Nichols 13-yard pass from Sean Canfield, Justin Kahut kick (Drive: 12 plays, 62 yards, 3:50; Arizona 35–32)
- (0:25) ARIZ – Team safety (Arizona 37–32)

Statistics	ARIZ	OSU
First downs	25	28
Total yards	388	407
Rushing yards	33–134	30–104
Passing yards	254	303
Passing: Comp–Att–Int	25–34–0	31–49–2
Time of possession	31:19	28:41

Team	Category	Player	Statistics
Arizona	Passing	Nick Foles	25/34, 254 yards, 3 TD
Arizona	Rushing	Keola Antolin	12 carries, 46 yards
Arizona	Receiving	Greg Nwoko	4 receptions, 76 yards
Oregon State	Passing	Sean Canfield	31/47, 303 yards, 2 TD, 2 INT
Oregon State	Rushing	Jacquizz Rodgers	16 carries, 85 yards, 2 TD
Oregon State	Receiving	James Rodgers	8 receptions, 119 yards

Running behind a third-string tailback and second-team left tackle, right guard and wide receiver (as well as a new starting QB, sophomore Nick Foles, the transfer from Michigan State) the Wildcats defeated Oregon State 35–32 at Reser Stadium in Corvallis, in the Pac-10 opener for Arizona. The Wildcats started the game without a half-dozen starters, including tight end Rob Gronkowski (who would end up being out the rest of the 2009 season due to back surgery). Tailbacks Nicolas Grigsby and Keola Antolin were out of the game by halftime with shoulder and leg injuries, respectively (Grigsby would not fully recover until the end of the season).

That left the Wildcats with third-stringer Greg Nwoko at running back. The redshirt freshman from the Austin, Texas area delivered: His 52-yard catch-and-run on a screen pass set Arizona up for its second touchdown of the quarter, a 3-yard pass from quarterback Nick Foles to receiver Juron Criner. Nwoko rushed nine times for 44 yards and a touchdown in the first extended action of his career.

Arizona took the lead early in the third quarter, when Foles — making his first college start — dove in on a sneak from the 1-yard line. Foles led his team on a 15-play, 71-yard scoring drive in the first quarter, connecting with WR Delashaun Dean for a 2-yard touchdown pass.

The Beavers scored their first touchdown with 2 minutes remaining in the quarter, when Damola Adeniji caught a tipped pass from QB Sean Canfield for an 11-yard score. James Rodgers gave OSU a 14–7 lead with a 2-yard run midway through the second quarter. Arizona tied the game on Nwoko's touchdown, but the Beavers re-took the lead on the final play before halftime. Justin Kahut's 21-yard field goal made it 17–14.

Foles appeared to put the game away when he found WR Terrell Turner for a 13-yard touchdown pass with eight minutes remaining, but the Beavers — resilient and persistent — proved tough to put away. Canfield found Aaron Nichols for a 13-yard score with 4:09 remaining, cutting Arizona's lead to 3.

CB Devin Ross intercepted Canfield with 1 minute 33 seconds remaining.

Even after surrendering a safety with 25 seconds left, Oregon State recovered an onside kick and had the ball, down five points, in their zone. This time, Arizona made the plays. Sacks by Earl Mitchell and Ricky Elmore ended the game.

Grigsby left the game after just one rushing attempt with what was discovered to be a sprained AC joint in his right shoulder. He was never fully healthy the rest of the season.

=== at Washington ===
Arizona Wildcats (3–1) at Washington Huskies (2–3) – Game summary

Quarter	1	2	3	4	Total
Wildcats	7	3	17	6	33
Huskies	7	7	7	15	36

at Husky Stadium • Seattle, WA

- Date: October 10, 2009
- Game time: 8:00 p.m.
- Game weather: Clear, 52 °F (11 °C)
- Game attendance: 61,621
- Referee: Michael Batlan
- TV announcers (Fox Sports Arizona): Tom Glasgow (play by play), Mack Strong (analyst), Jen Mueller (sideline reporter)

Game information

First quarter

- (6:51) ARIZ – Greg Nwoko 12-yard run, Alex Zendejas kick (Drive: 8 plays, 67 yards, 3:36; Arizona 7–0)
- (4:55) WASH – Jake Locker 56-yard run, Erik Folk kick (Drive: 5 plays, 76 yards, 1:50; Tied 7–7)

Second quarter

- (14:55) ARIZ – Alex Zendejas 18-yard field goal (Drive: 9 plays, 68 yards, 4:51; Arizona 10–7)
- (6:30) WASH – Devin Aguilar 5-yard pass from Jake Locker, Erik Folk kick (Drive: 8 plays, 75 yards, 3:08; Washington 14–10)

Third quarter

- (11:49) ARIZ – David Roberts 9-yard pass from Nick Foles, Alex Zendejas kick (Drive: 7 plays, 47 yards, 3:04; Arizona 17–14)
- (9:31) ARIZ – Alex Zendejas 23-yard field goal (Drive: 4 plays, 4 yards, 1:05; Arizona 20–14)
- (2:55) ARIZ – Nick Foles 1-yard run, Alex Zendejas kick (Drive: 8 plays, 36 yards, 4:37; Arizona 27–14)
- (2:04) WASH – Devin Aguilar 29-yard pass from Jake Locker, Erik Folk kick (Drive: 2 plays, 39 yards, 0:45; Arizona 27–21)

Fourth quarter

- (13:20) ARIZ – Alex Zendejas 29-yard field goal (Drive: 10 plays, 62 yards, 3:37; Arizona 30–21)
- (4:22) ARIZ – Alex Zendejas 24-yard field goal (Drive: 12 plays, 73 yards, 6:38; Arizona 33–21)
- (2:55) WASH – Kavario Middleton 25-yard pass from Jake Locker, Erik Folk kick (Drive: 6 plays, 59 yards, 1:21; Arizona 33–28)
- (2:37) WASH – Mason Foster 37-yard interception return, Jake Locker two-point pass to Jermaine Kearse (Washington 36–33)

Statistics	ARIZ	WASH
First downs	26	14
Total yards	461	256
Rushing yards	30–77	24–116
Passing yards	384	140
Passing: Comp–Att–Int	39–53–2	12–23–1
Time of possession	39:19	20:41

Team	Category	Player	Statistics
Arizona	Passing	Nick Foles	39/53, 384 yards, TD, 2 INT
Arizona	Rushing	Greg Nwoko	16 carries, 54 yards, TD
Arizona	Receiving	David Roberts	12 receptions, 138 yards, TD
Washington	Passing	Jake Locker	12/23, 140 yards, 3 TD, INT
Washington	Rushing	Jake Locker	11 carries, 92 yards, TD
Washington	Receiving	Devin Aguilar	3 receptions, 43 yards, 2 TD

In a controversial play, Washington LB Mason Foster intercepted a deflected pass off the foot of Arizona's Delashaun Dean (who insisted the pass hit the ground) and returned the carom 37 yards for a touchdown with 2:37 left, and the Huskies rallied with two touchdowns in the final three minutes to beat the Wildcats 36–33 in Seattle.

On the call, Dean commented: "I felt it graze my foot, but the way the ball bounced up, it would have hit my foot a lot harder", Dean said. "I figured it had to hit the ground, then after seeing the pictures you could actually see the black beads from the turf jump up when the ball hit the ground. It's pretty obvious when you look at it. I don't know how it got missed."

Led by quarterback Jake Locker, Washington overcame a 12-point deficit in the final 3 minutes to hand Arizona the loss. Arizona lost the game despite a torrid third quarter. QB Nick Foles connected with David Roberts on a 9-yard touchdown pass on the Wildcats’ first possession of the second half. The Wildcats got the ball back — and scored again — following a strange play.

Washington punter Will Mahan muffed a snap on fourth down deep in the Huskies' zone on their first possession of the second half. He recovered the muff, took a few steps and kicked a ball that rolled 12 yards behind the original line of scrimmage. Mahan was flagged for an illegal kick, and the Huskies were penalized half the distance to the goal line – 9 yards.

Arizona turned the good fortune into a 23-yard Alex Zendejas field goal. The Wildcats capped their 17-point quarter with an eight-play, 36-yard drive; Foles delivered the crushing blow on third-and-goal from the Huskies’ 1, faking a hand-off up the middle and bootlegging into the end zone for a touchdown.

Washington cut Arizona's lead to six points just before the quarter's end, when Devin Aguilar caught his second touchdown pass of the night, a 29-yarder from Jake Locker. But Zendejas nailed a 29-yarder on the first possession of the fourth quarter.

The UA was leading 33–21 when Washington took over with the ball with 4:16 remaining in the contest. But the Wildcats' LB Vuna Tuihalamka was flagged for a late hit on a missed pass, getting Washington past midfield. It took quarterback Jake Locker six plays to travel 59 yards; his 25-yard touchdown pass to tight end Kavario Middleton cut the Wildcats' lead to 33–28 with 2:55 left.

The Huskies then chose to kick the ball deep, figuring that — with two timeouts left — they could try to force Arizona to punt. The Wildcats instead went for the kill. On first down, the Wildcats called what Stoops dubbed a run-pass option play, meaning Foles could check down to a run or choose to throw. He threw.

When his first few options weren't there, the quarterback attempted a short screen route to Dean. The ball glanced off the side of his right shoe and into Mason Foster's hands. The Huskies' linebacker ran in untouched. The defeat of Arizona came as the Husky football program, winless during the 2008 season, was trying to rebuild under their new head coach, former USC offensive coordinator Steve Sarkisian (for their part, the Huskies finished the season 5–7 and 4–5 in Pac-10 play).

Following the game, head coach Mike Stoops said Arizona coaches were to blame for the poor call — even though Foles had been running the play all night with great success. He completed 39 of 53 passes for 384 yards and a touchdown. Offensive coordinator Sonny Dykes, however, defended the call. Arizona settled for four field goals and continued to struggle in the red zone. The Wildcats limited Locker to just 140 passing yards, but let him drive at will when one stop would have ended the game.

=== vs Stanford ===
Stanford Cardinal (4–2) vs Arizona Wildcats (3–2) – Game summary

Quarter	1	2	3	4	Total
Cardinal	14	14	10	0	38
Wildcats	13	7	9	14	43

at Arizona Stadium • Tucson, AZ

- Date: October 17, 2009
- Game time: 4:30 p.m.
- Game weather: Clear, 95 °F (35 °C)
- Game attendance: 53,479
- Referee: Brian O'Cain
- TV announcers (Versus): Ron Thulin (play by play), Kelly Stouffer (analyst), Lewis Johnson (sideline reporter)

Game information

First quarter

- (12:31) ARIZ – Robert Golden 79-yard interception return, Alex Zendejas kick (Arizona 7–0)
- (10:26) STAN – Jim Dray 30-yard pass from Andrew Luck, Nate Whitaker kick (Drive: 4 plays, 44 yards, 1:38; Tied 7–7)
- (4:40) ARIZ – David Douglas 43-yard pass from Nick Foles, kick failed (Drive: 3 plays, 47 yards, 0:48; Arizona 13–7)
- (0:48) STAN – Toby Gerhart 2-yard run, Nate Whitaker kick (Drive: 8 plays, 82 yards, 3:45; Stanford 14–13)

Second quarter

- (9:16) STAN – Ryan Whalen 11-yard pass from Andrew Luck, Nate Whitaker kick (Drive: 10 plays, 68 yards, 4:48; Stanford 21–13)
- (3:04) STAN – Chris Owusu 19-yard pass from Andrew Luck, Nate Whitaker kick (Drive: 6 plays, 80 yards, 2:55; Stanford 28–13)
- (0:18) ARIZ – Terrell Turner 11-yard pass from Nick Foles, Alex Zendejas kick (Drive: 12 plays, 89 yards, 2:36; Stanford 28–20)

Third quarter

- (12:43) ARIZ – Alex Zendejas 24-yard field goal (Drive: 9 plays, 64 yards, 2:11; Stanford 28–23)
- (9:55) STAN – Nate Whitaker 33-yard field goal (Drive: 5 plays, 47 yards, 2:42; Stanford 31–23)
- (6:27) ARIZ – David Douglas 1-yard pass from Nick Foles, two-point pass failed (Drive: 10 plays, 80 yards, 3:28; Stanford 31–29)
- (3:23) STAN – Toby Gerhart 2-yard run, Nate Whitaker kick (Drive: 6 plays, 86 yards, 2:59; Stanford 38–29)

Fourth quarter

- (10:06) ARIZ – Greg Nwoko 43-yard run, Alex Zendejas kick (Drive: 6 plays, 80 yards, 2:36; Stanford 38–36)
- (2:57) ARIZ – Nic Grigsby 57-yard run, Alex Zendejas kick (Drive: 5 plays, 92 yards, 2:30; Arizona 43–38)

Statistics	STAN	ARIZ
First downs	26	23
Total yards	584	553
Rushing yards	40–150	14–138
Passing yards	434	415
Passing: Comp–Att–Int	22–36–1	40–52–0
Time of possession	36:10	23:50

Team	Category	Player	Statistics
Stanford	Passing	Andrew Luck	21/35, 423 yards, 3 TD, INT
Stanford	Rushing	Toby Gerhart	28 carries, 123 yards, 2 TD
Stanford	Receiving	Chris Owusu	5 receptions, 116 yards, TD
Arizona	Passing	Nick Foles	40/51, 415 yards, 3 TD
Arizona	Rushing	Nic Grigsby	7 carries, 89 yards, TD
Arizona	Receiving	Juron Criner	12 receptions, 152 yards

In a game that featured more than a thousand offensive yards, the Wildcats rallied back late to defeat the Cardinal. The quarterbacks were evenly matched: Stanford quarterback Andrew Luck threw for 423 yards and three touchdowns, while Arizona's Nick Foles also tossed three touchdown passes and had a total of 415 yards. Stanford's Toby Gerhart had 123 yards and two touchdowns. Arizona managed a total of just 138 rush yards, but 57 of those came on Nic Grigsby's go-ahead touchdown with under three minutes left. Stanford drove to the Arizona 17 with seconds to play, but a fourth-down pass to Chris Owusu was batted away and the Wildcats escaped with a home victory.

=== vs UCLA ===
UCLA Bruins (3–3) vs No. 22 Arizona Wildcats (4–2) – Game summary

Quarter	1	2	3	4	Total
Bruins	0	3	10	0	13
No. 22 Wildcats	13	0	14	0	27

at Arizona Stadium • Tucson, AZ

- Date: October 24, 2009
- Game time: 3:30 p.m.
- Game weather: Clear, 84 °F (29 °C)
- Game attendance: 51,440
- Referee: Brian O'Cain
- TV announcers (Fox Sports Arizona): Steve Physioc (play by play), James Washington (analyst)

Game information

First quarter

- (4:39) ARIZ – Juron Criner 41-yard pass from Nick Foles, Alex Zendejas kick (Drive: 3 plays, 54 yards, 1:22; Arizona 7–0)
- (3:19) ARIZ – Nic Grigsby 6-yard run, kick failed (Drive: 3 plays, 23 yards, 1:07; Arizona 13–0)

Second quarter

- (7:51) UCLA – Kai Forbath 53-yard field goal (Drive: 8 plays, 27 yards, 5:12; Arizona 13–3)

Third quarter

- (13:39) UCLA – Kai Forbath 33-yard field goal (Drive: 4 plays, 2 yards, 1:06; Arizona 13–6)
- (8:34) ARIZ – Juron Criner 25-yard pass from Nick Foles, Alex Zendejas kick (Drive: 6 plays, 51 yards, 1:23; Arizona 20–6)
- (5:20) UCLA – Tony Dye 28-yard fumble return, Kai Forbath kick (Arizona 20–13)
- (0:34) ARIZ – Nick Booth 6-yard run, Alex Zendejas kick (Drive: 10 plays, 63 yards, 4:38; Arizona 27–13)

Fourth quarter

- No scoring plays

Statistics	UCLA	ARIZ
First downs	10	27
Total yards	211	456
Rushing yards	23–65	46–209
Passing yards	146	247
Passing: Comp–Att–Int	15–35–0	22–35–3
Time of possession	24:22	35:38

Team	Category	Player	Statistics
UCLA	Passing	Kevin Craft	6/17, 75 yards
UCLA	Rushing	Johnathan Franklin	9 carries, 36 yards
UCLA	Receiving	Nelson Rosario	2 receptions, 27 yards
Arizona	Passing	Nick Foles	22/34, 247 yards, 2 TD, 3 INT
Arizona	Rushing	Keola Antolin	16 carries, 77 yards
Arizona	Receiving	Juron Criner	4 receptions, 85 yards, 2 TD

In the first quarter, Arizona's first drive ended when UCLA safety Rahim Moore intercepted a Nick Foles pass. But in their second drive, Foles passed to Juron Criner for a 41-yard touchdown to give the Wildcats a lead. After Arizona recovered a Bruin fumble, Grigsby rushed into the end zone for a 6-yard touchdown, extra point blocked.

Both Moore and Jerzy Siewierski intercepted a Wildcats pass in the second quarter. Kai Forbath kicked a 53-yard field goal to put UCLA on the board before the half. UCLA's Datone Jones recovered a Foles fumble and Forbath kicked a field goal to begin the third quarter. Kevin Craft came in to replace Kevin Prince in UCLA's second possession, but Christian Ramirez fumbled the ball to Arizona, which led to the Wildcats' third touchdown, a Nick Foles 25-yard pass to Criner. Tony Dye recovered a Wildcats fumble and ran in for a 28-yard UCLA touchdown. Late in the third quarter, Nick Booth rushed for 6 yards for a score to give Arizona a 27–13 lead.

In the fourth quarter, the Bruins were unable to do anything and lost their fourth game in a row.

=== vs Washington State ===
Washington State Cougars (1–7) vs No. 21 Arizona Wildcats (5–2) – Game summary

Quarter	1	2	3	4	Total
Cougars	0	0	0	7	7
No. 21 Wildcats	24	10	7	7	48

at Arizona Stadium • Tucson, AZ

- Date: November 7, 2009
- Game time: 1:30 p.m.
- Game weather: Scattered clouds, 78 °F (26 °C)
- Game attendance: 50,242
- Referee: Larry Farina
- TV announcers (FCS Pacific): Dave Sitton (play-by-play), John Fina (analyst), Glenn Howell (sideline reporter)

Game information

First quarter

- (14:47) ARIZ – Travis Cobb 95-yard kickoff return, Alex Zendejas kick (Arizona 7–0)
- (11:43) ARIZ – Terrell Turner 28-yard pass from Nick Foles, Alex Zendejas kick (Drive: 3 plays, 44 yards, 1:05; Arizona 14–0)
- (7:21) ARIZ – Keola Antolin 1-yard run, Alex Zendejas kick (Drive: 7 plays, 65 yards, 2:58; Arizona 21–0)
- (0:24) ARIZ – Alex Zendejas 21-yard field goal (Drive: 12 plays, 75 yards, 5:55; Arizona 24–0)

Second quarter

- (13:28) ARIZ – Nick Booth 1-yard run, Alex Zendejas kick (Drive: 3 plays, 14 yards, 1:22; Arizona 31–0)
- (1:23) ARIZ – Alex Zendejas 27-yard field goal (Drive: 14 plays, 69 yards, 7:07; Arizona 34–0)

Third quarter

- (13:27) ARIZ – William Wright 86-yard punt return, Alex Zendejas kick (Arizona 41–0)

Fourth quarter

- (7:06) ARIZ – Taimi Tutogi 1-yard run, John Bonano kick (Drive: 15 plays, 97 yards, 8:07; Arizona 48–0)
- (6:23) WSU – Jared Karstetter 64-yard pass from Marshall Lobbestael, Patrick Rooney kick (Drive: 2 plays, 71 yards, 0:37; Arizona 48–7)

Statistics	WSU	ARIZ
First downs	8	27
Total yards	185	471
Rushing yards	21–59	54–294
Passing yards	126	177
Passing: Comp–Att–Int	12–21–0	15–24–0
Time of possession	18:41	41:19

Team	Category	Player	Statistics
Washington State	Passing	Marshall Lobbestael	7/11, 103 yards, TD
Washington State	Rushing	Dwight Tardy	4 carries, 44 yards
Washington State	Receiving	Jared Karstetter	1 reception, 64 yards, TD
Arizona	Passing	Nick Foles	12/19, 136 yards, TD
Arizona	Rushing	Matt Scott	10 carries, 91 yards
Arizona	Receiving	Delashaun Dean	4 receptions, 53 yards

=== at California ===
No. 17 Arizona Wildcats (6–2) at California Golden Bears (6–3) – Game summary

Quarter	1	2	3	4	Total
No. 17 Wildcats	0	10	0	6	16
Golden Bears	3	6	6	9	24

at California Memorial Stadium • Berkeley, CA

- Date: November 14, 2009
- Game time: 4:00 p.m.
- Game weather: Clear skies, 60 °F (16 °C)
- Game attendance: 53,347
- Referee: Michael Batlan
- TV announcers (Versus): Ted Robinson (play by play), Glenn Parker (analyst), Lewis Johnson (sideline reporter)

Game information

First quarter

- (9:12) CAL – Giorgio Tavecchio 46-yard field goal (Drive: 11 plays, 56 yards, 5:48; California 3–0)

Second quarter

- (14:17) CAL – Giorgio Tavecchio 22-yard field goal (Drive: 8 plays, 27 yards, 3:48; California 6–0)
- (3:37) ARIZ – Keola Antolin 1-yard run, Alex Zendejas kick (Drive: 10 plays, 93 yards, 4:47; Arizona 7–6)
- (0:22) ARIZ – Alex Zendejas 36-yard field goal (Drive: 7 plays, 37 yards, 1:30; Arizona 10–6)
- (0:00) CAL – Giorgio Tavecchio 46-yard field goal (Drive: 5 plays, 32 yards, 0:22; Arizona 10–9)

Third quarter

- (8:21) CAL – Skylar Curran 27-yard pass from Kevin Riley, two-point run failed (Drive: 1 play, 27 yards, 0:08; California 15–10)

Fourth quarter

- (12:26) ARIZ – A.J. Simmons 8-yard pass from Nick Foles, two-point pass failed (Drive: 10 plays, 80 yards, 4:20; Arizona 16–15)
- (4:46) CAL – Giorgio Tavecchio 22-yard field goal (Drive: 13 plays, 72 yards, 7:35; California 18–16)
- (1:21) CAL – Shane Vereen 61-yard run, two-point run failed (Drive: 1 play, 61 yards, 0:09; California 24–16)

Statistics	ARIZ	CAL
First downs	18	18
Total yards	274	357
Rushing yards	28–73	40–176
Passing yards	201	181
Passing: Comp–Att–Int	25–41–1	13–22–2
Time of possession	28:13	31:47

Team	Category	Player	Statistics
Arizona	Passing	Nick Foles	25/41, 201 yards, TD, INT
Arizona	Rushing	Keola Antolin	19 carries, 78 yards, TD
Arizona	Receiving	David Roberts	4 receptions, 52 yards
California	Passing	Kevin Riley	13/22, 181 yards, TD, 2 INT
California	Rushing	Shane Vereen	30 carries, 159 yards, TD
California	Receiving	Marvin Jones	5 receptions, 65 yards

In their final home season game, California started backup RB Shane Vereen in place of their star RB Jahvid Best, who was still recovering from a concussion sustained the previous week. The then-#18 ranked Wildcats were also missing their starting RB, Nic Grigsby, with ongoing shoulder troubles.

Cal's Giorgio Tavecchio hit four field goals, including a 22-yard go-ahead kick with 4 minutes 46 seconds remaining, to boost the Golden Bears past a desperate UA team.

Tavecchio contributed in other ways, too. After hitting the field goal that put Cal ahead for good, the kicker tackled Arizona's Travis Cobb on a kickoff return. Bolstered by Cobb's return, the Wildcats drove deep into Cal territory.

Arizona faced third-and-three from the Cal 25 when QB Nick Foles dropped back and attempted a short pass. The ball deflected off a Cal defender and back into the hands of Foles, who rolled right and threw it forward again — this time for a completion to WR Delashaun Dean. Foles was flagged for an illegal forward pass, and Arizona was penalized 5 yards from the spot of the penalty, 9 yards behind the line of scrimmage. The Wildcats' field goal unit stood on the sideline when, on fourth-and-17 from the Golden Bears' 39, Foles attempted a desperate pass to David Roberts that was broken up.

Foles' mistake was emblematic of the Cats' struggles. Arizona gained just 274 yards, 174 below its season average. Foles completed 25 of 41 passes for 201 yards and a touchdown, but was intercepted once and sacked three times. Foles had only been sacked four times before all season before the game. The Wildcats rushed for just 73 yards as a team, a 2.6 yards-per-carry average that rarely equates to wins. And yet Arizona had its chances.

Cal scored a late touchdown but botched a PAT attempt, leaving Arizona a chance to drive for a game-tying touchdown and two-point conversion. The Wildcats had hope, but struggled to make the simplest of plays. Their last drive included an incomplete pass, a holding call (which was declined) and two sacks.

Things weren't much better on defense.

California QB Kevin Riley threw for 181 yards and a score, with two interceptions. Vereen had 30 carries for 159 yards, both career highs, including one score. Keola Antolin, who had rushed for 149 yards against the Bears in 2008, was held to 78 yards and a score. This was Cal's fourth straight victory over the Wildcats in Berkeley, and moved them up to #25 in the BCS rankings (they would go on to an 8–5 (5–4 Pac-10) regular season and lose 37–27 to Utah in the 2009 Poinsettia Bowl).

Arizona, on the other hand, seemed to have its relatively high hopes for its first-ever appearance in the Rose Bowl placed in jeopardy with the frustrating road loss.

=== vs Oregon ===
No. 11 Oregon Ducks (8–2) vs Arizona Wildcats (6–3) – Game summary

Quarter	1	2	3	4	OT	2OT	Total
No. 11 Ducks	7	7	0	17	7	6	44
Wildcats	0	10	7	14	7	3	41

at Arizona Stadium • Tucson, AZ

- Date: November 21, 2009
- Game time: 6:00 p.m.
- Game weather: Clear, 69 °F (21 °C)
- Game attendance: 57,863
- Referee: Larry Farina
- TV announcers (ABC): Brent Musburger (play by play), Kirk Herbstreit (analyst), Lisa Salters (sideline reporter)

Game information

First quarter

- (10:57) ORE – Jeremiah Masoli 14-yard run, Morgan Flint kick (Drive: 9 plays, 74 yards, 4:03; Oregon 7–0)

Second quarter

- (10:10) ORE – Jeff Maehl 9-yard pass from Jeremiah Masoli, Morgan Flint kick (Drive: 8 plays, 72 yards, 4:00; Oregon 14–0)
- (1:59) ARIZ – Juron Criner 5-yard pass from Nick Foles, Alex Zendejas kick (Drive: 5 plays, 44 yards, 2:19; Oregon 14–7)
- (0:00) ARIZ – Alex Zendejas 47-yard field goal (Drive: 7 plays, 37 yards, 0:49; Oregon 14–10)

Third quarter

- (10:39) ARIZ – Nick Booth 8-yard run, Alex Zendejas kick (Drive: 4 plays, 31 yards, 1:55; Arizona 17–14)

Fourth quarter

- (13:57) ARIZ – William Wright 5-yard pass from Nick Foles, Alex Zendejas kick (Drive: 10 plays, 71 yards, 3:35; Arizona 24–14)
- (10:57) ORE – Jeremiah Masoli 1-yard run, Morgan Flint kick (Drive: 10 plays, 79 yards, 2:54; Arizona 24–21)
- (8:02) ORE – Morgan Flint 43-yard field goal (Drive: 5 plays, 19 yards, 1:54; Tied 24–24)
- (7:41) ARIZ – Juron Criner 71-yard pass from Nick Foles, Alex Zendejas kick (Drive: 1 play, 71 yards, 0:14; Arizona 31–24)
- (0:06) ORE – Ed Dickson 8-yard pass from Jeremiah Masoli, Morgan Flint kick (Drive: 15 plays, 80 yards, 3:05; Tied 31–31)

First overtime

- ORE – Jeff Maehl 4-yard pass from Jeremiah Masoli, Morgan Flint kick (Drive: 5 plays, 25 yards; Oregon 38–31)
- ARIZ – Juron Criner 3-yard pass from Nick Foles, Alex Zendejas kick (Drive: 7 plays, 25 yards; Tied 38–38)

Second overtime

- ARIZ – Alex Zendejas 41-yard field goal (Drive: 4 plays, 25 yards; Arizona 41–38)
- ORE – Jeremiah Masoli 1-yard run (Drive: 4 plays, 25 yards; Oregon 44–41)

Statistics	ORE	ARIZ
First downs	22	22
Total yards	459	441
Rushing yards	37–175	35–127
Passing yards	284	314
Passing: Comp–Att–Int	26–47–1	30–47–1
Time of possession	27:52	47:08

Team	Category	Player	Statistics
Oregon	Passing	Jeremiah Masoli	26/47, 284 yards, 3 TD, INT
Oregon	Rushing	LaMichael James	19 carries, 117 yards
Oregon	Receiving	Jeff Maehl	12 receptions, 114 yards, 2 TD
Arizona	Passing	Nick Foles	30/46, 314 yards, 4 TD, INT
Arizona	Rushing	Greg Nwoko	16 carries, 58 yards
Arizona	Receiving	Juron Criner	5 receptions, 93 yards, 3 TD

In a PAC-10 conference showdown that prompted College Gameday to pay its first visit to the University of Arizona campus, the outcome of the game would ultimately send the winning team to the Rose Bowl Game. The Fans and the Arizona Wildcats players all wore red with the intent to "Red Out Oregon".

Oregon QB Jeremiah Masoli's touchdown plunge on third-and-goal in the second overtime period gave the Ducks a come-from-behind, 44–41 victory over the U of A before 57,863 fans at Arizona Stadium and a national TV audience (ESPN on ABC). The Ducks overcame a 10-point fourth-quarter deficit to force overtime, then scored touchdowns on both their possessions. Hundreds of red-clad Arizona students from the "Zona Zoo" student section were on the sidelines, preparing for a victory party, when Masoli hit tight end Ed Dickson for an 8-yard touchdown with six seconds left in regulation to tie the game.

The teams traded scores in the first overtime; Arizona started the second OT with the ball and hit a field goal only to watch the Ducks drive 25 yards in four plays for the win.

Masoli was brilliant in a 15-play, 80-yard drive at the end of regulation, converting on two fourth-down plays to get deep into Arizona territory. With Oregon trailing 31–24, Masoli found Dickson in the middle of the end zone. Kicker Morgan Flint's PAT tied it at 31, forcing the first overtime game at Arizona Stadium since 2003.

Oregon started overtime with the ball, and drove quickly. LaMichael James' 21-yard run moved the Ducks to Arizona's 4. On third-and-goal, Masoli found Jeff Maehl for a 4-yard touchdown. The Wildcats tied the game on its ensuing possession when QB Nick Foles hit Juron Criner for a 3-yard score, the receiver's third touchdown of the night. Arizona HC Mike Stoops instantly sent place-kicker Alex Zendejas out to tie it, though a two-point conversion could have won the game.

The Wildcats had the ball to start the second overtime but gained just 1 yard on three plays. Zendejas gave the UA a 41–38 lead with a 41-yard field goal. It didn't last. Masoli found Dickson on a 23-yard pass on Oregon's first play of the second overtime. The Ducks gained a yard on their next two plays, setting up third-and-goal from the 1. Masoli faked on a lead-option play and ran in the score.

The result left Arizona reeling, especially since the Wildcats appeared to have the game in hand in the fourth quarter. Arizona led by a touchdown late when Foles attempted to put the game away with a pass into the end zone; WR Terrell Turner tipped the ball, and Oregon's Talmadge Jackson III intercepted it and took a touchback.

Wide receiver David Douglas fumbled at the Ducks' 2 in the first quarter. CB Trevin Wade dropped a sure interception in the second half, and Zendejas missed a short field goal that would have put the UA up by 6.

The Wildcats' defense, so solid all night, forced two Masoli fumbles but couldn't recover them. That only made it worse. "We let a lot of good things slip away", safety Cam Nelson said. "I don't really know what else to say."

In winning, Oregon eliminated Arizona from Rose Bowl contention. Masoli finished with 345 yards of total offense and six touchdowns.

=== at Arizona State ===
Arizona Wildcats (6–4) at Arizona State Sun Devils (4–7) – Game summary

Quarter	1	2	3	4	Total
Wildcats	7	7	0	6	20
Sun Devils	0	0	3	14	17

at Sun Devil Stadium • Tempe, AZ

- Date: November 28, 2009
- Game time: 1:30 p.m.
- Game weather: Partly Cloudy, 70 °F (21 °C)
- Game attendance: 55,989
- Referee: Brian O'Cain
- TV announcers (ABC): Terry Gannon (play-by-play), David Norrie (analyst)

Game information

First quarter

- (3:54) ARIZ – Keola Antolin 67-yard run, Alex Zendejas kick (Drive: 3 plays, 84 yards, 1:18; Arizona 7–0)

Second quarter

- (3:50) ARIZ – Orlando Vargas 23-yard blocked punt return, Alex Zendejas kick (Arizona 14–0)

Third quarter

- (6:50) ASU – Thomas Weber 26-yard field goal (Drive: 4 plays, 7 yards, 0:57; Arizona 14–3)

Fourth quarter

- (11:54) ASU – Kyle Williams 44-yard pass from Danny Sullivan, Thomas Weber kick (Drive: 7 plays, 96 yards, 2:49; Arizona 14–10)
- (7:50) ARIZ – Alex Zendejas 30-yard field goal (Drive: 11 plays, 63 yards, 3:58; Arizona 17–10)
- (2:02) ASU – Kyle Williams 14-yard pass from Danny Sullivan, Thomas Weber kick (Drive: 9 plays, 48 yards, 3:46; Tied 17–17)
- (0:00) ARIZ – Alex Zendejas 32-yard field goal (Drive: 4 plays, 7 yards, 1:03; Arizona 20–17)

Statistics	ARIZ	ASU
First downs	13	14
Total yards	265	303
Rushing yards	23–117	30–86
Passing yards	148	217
Passing: Comp–Att–Int	24–43–0	17–33–0
Time of possession	28:47	31:13

Team	Category	Player	Statistics
Arizona	Passing	Nick Foles	24/43, 148 yards
Arizona	Rushing	Keola Antolin	7 carries, 78 yards, TD
Arizona	Receiving	Delashaun Dean	4 receptions, 30 yards
Arizona State	Passing	Danny Sullivan	14/28, 168 yards, 2 TD
Arizona State	Rushing	Dimitri Nance	23 carries, 115 yards
Arizona State	Receiving	Kyle Williams	9 receptions, 130 yards, 2 TD

Alex Zendejas kicked a 32-yard field goal as time expired, and the Wildcats defeated their primary in-state rival, Arizona State (ASU), 20–17 in Tempe to retain the Territorial Cup.

Arizona won after ASU's Kyle Williams – who had caught the tying touchdown pass minutes earlier – muffed a punt to give the Wildcats the ball at the ASU 22-yard line. Keola Antolin scored on a 67-yard run and Orlando Vargas blocked a punt and returned it for a touchdown for the Wildcats, who have beaten the Sun Devils in back-to-back seasons for the first time since 1997–98.

Dimitri Nance ran for 115 yards for the Sun Devils, who lost their last six games, matching the school record for consecutive losses in a season.

Down 14–0 at halftime, the Sun Devils rallied and appeared ready to force Arizona into their second overtime situation of the season with 2:02 remaining. On 4th-and-12 from Arizona's 14, ASU QB Danny Sullivan rolled out of the pocket and fired a strike to a diving Williams in the back of the end zone. It was their second scoring connection of the quarter, following a 44-yarder with 11:54 to go.

Arizona defense was led by Ricky Elmore who had 2 sacks, 5 tackles and 1 forced fumble.

Then came a critical ASU error. Williams muffed a Keenyn Crier punt, and the Wildcats' Mike Turner recovered at the Sun Devils' 22-yard line. Four plays later, Zendejas, a Phoenix-area native (some of his Glendale, Arizona family were in attendance), trotted on and nailed the game-winner.

The game ended with a scuffle at midfield. ASU linebacker Vontaze Burfict took a swing at UA backup longsnapper Ricky Wolder. Vontaze Burfict a true-freshman at 6feet 3 inches and 245 pounds swung wildly at Wolder without making any contact. Players from both sides had to be separated so they could clear the field.

This was Mike Stoops' third win over Arizona State, and arguably the most important one of his career.

=== at No. 18 USC ===
Arizona Wildcats (7–4) at No. 18 USC Trojans (8–3) – Game summary

Quarter	1	2	3	4	Total
Wildcats	7	7	0	7	21
No. 18 Trojans	0	7	7	3	17

at Los Angeles Memorial Coliseum • Los Angeles, CA

- Date: December 5, 2009
- Game time: 1:30 p.m.
- Game weather: Cloudy, 59 °F (15 °C)
- Game attendance: 83,753
- Referee: Jack Folliard
- TV announcers (ABC): Mike Patrick (play by play), Craig James (analyst), Brock Huard (analyst), Heather Cox (sideline reporter)

Game information

First quarter

- (8:49) ARIZ – Delashaun Dean 4-yard pass from Nick Foles, Alex Zendejas kick (Drive: 8 plays, 37 yards, 3:20; Arizona 7–0)

Second quarter

- (12:25) USC – Ronald Johnson 16-yard pass from Matt Barkley, Jordan Congdon kick (Drive: 13 plays, 80 yards, 5:17; Tied 7–7)
- (4:35) ARIZ – Nick Foles 1-yard run, Alex Zendejas kick (Drive: 15 plays, 90 yards, 7:50; Arizona 14–7)

Third quarter

- (1:46) USC – Allen Bradford 5-yard run, Jordan Congdon kick (Drive: 7 plays, 53 yards, 3:17; Tied 14–14)

Fourth quarter

- (7:13) USC – Jordan Congdon 37-yard field goal (Drive: 12 plays, 54 yards, 5:58; USC 17–14)
- (3:14) ARIZ – Juron Criner 36-yard pass from Nick Foles, Alex Zendejas kick (Drive: 10 plays, 80 yards, 3:59; Arizona 21–17)

Statistics	ARIZ	USC
First downs	17	20
Total yards	321	282
Rushing yards	29–82	31–138
Passing yards	239	144
Passing: Comp–Att–Int	22–40–1	20–37–1
Time of possession	31:18	28:42

Team	Category	Player	Statistics
Arizona	Passing	Nick Foles	22/40, 239 yards, 2 TD, INT
Arizona	Rushing	Keola Antolin	13 carries, 51 yards
Arizona	Receiving	Juron Criner	6 receptions, 71 yards, TD
USC	Passing	Matt Barkley	20/37, 144 yards, TD, INT
USC	Rushing	Allen Bradford	11 carries, 66 yards, TD
USC	Receiving	Damian Williams	8 receptions, 51 yards

In the season finale, WR Juron Criner dived into the end zone with a 36-yard touchdown pass from Nick Foles with 3:14 to play, and Arizona secured a 21–17 victory USC.

Foles passed for 239 yards and two touchdowns and ran for another score for the Wildcats, who finally beat USC for the first time in coach Mike Stoops' tenure by scoring the final touchdown in a defense-dominated game. Foles went 22 of 40 but made several clutch throws, including an early touchdown pass to WR Delashaun Dean.

The Wildcats ended a seven-game losing streak against USC, and the Wildcats also have their first win over the Trojans during the Pete Carroll era. The Trojans, who came into the contest ranked #20 in the Associated Press poll, dropped out of the national rankings with the loss and dropped to #24 in the BCS standings.

Arizona is also the first non-Stanford team in the Pac-10 to defeat USC in the Coliseum during the Carroll era (Stanford defeated Carroll's teams in the Coliseum in 2001, 2007, and 2009 while the Big 12's Kansas State defeated the Trojans in the Coliseum in 2001—the only other victory by a team over a USC home team coached by Carroll). With the Wildcats' win, Arizona State becomes the only remaining Pac-10 team that has never beaten the Trojans in the Carroll era.

With a final regular season overall record of 8–4, Arizona accepted an invitation to the 2009 Pacific Life Holiday Bowl after this game. The Trojans were invited to the 2009 Emerald Bowl in San Francisco, they defeated Boston College 24–13.

=== vs No. 22 Nebraska (Holiday Bowl) ===
No. 22 Arizona Wildcats (8–4) vs No. 20 Nebraska Cornhuskers (9–4) – Game summary
(2009 Pacific Life Holiday Bowl)

Quarter	1	2	3	4	Total
No. 22 Wildcats	0	0	0	0	0
No. 20 Cornhuskers	10	13	10	0	33

at Qualcomm Stadium • San Diego, CA

- Date: December 31, 2009
- Game time: 6:00 p.m.
- Game weather: Cool, overcast, 52 °F (11 °C)
- Game attendance: 64,607
- Referee: Tom Zimorski
- TV announcers (ESPN): Chris Fowler (play-by-play), Craig James (analyst), Jesse Palmer (analyst), Erin Andrews (sideline reporter)

Game information

First quarter

- (13:45) NEB – Zac Lee 4-yard run, Alex Henery kick (Drive: 2 plays, 5 yards, 0:48; Nebraska 7–0)
- (8:53) NEB – Alex Henery 47-yard field goal (Drive: 7 plays, 31 yards, 3:08; Nebraska 10–0)

Second quarter

- (11:57) NEB – Rex Burkhead 5-yard run, Alex Henery kick (Drive: 7 plays, 82 yards, 3:41; Nebraska 17–0)
- (8:25) NEB – Alex Henery 50-yard field goal (Drive: 7 plays, 14 yards, 2:26; Nebraska 20–0)
- (0:35) NEB – Alex Henery 41-yard field goal (Drive: 12 plays, 44 yards, 6:07; Nebraska 23–0)

Third quarter

- (10:07) NEB – Alex Henery 22-yard field goal (Drive: 11 plays, 41 yards, 4:53; Nebraska 26–0)
- (3:39) NEB – Niles Paul 74-yard pass from Zac Lee, Alex Henery kick (Drive: 6 plays, 89 yards, 3:12; Nebraska 33–0)

Fourth quarter

- No scoring plays

Statistics	ARIZ	NEB
First downs	6	19
Total yards	109	396
Rushing yards	20–63	48–223
Passing yards	46	173
Passing: Comp–Att–Int	10–31–1	13–25–0
Time of possession	21:48	38:12

Team	Category	Player	Statistics
Arizona	Passing	Nick Foles	9/29, 48 yards, INT
Arizona	Rushing	Keola Antolin	11 carries, 69 yards
Arizona	Receiving	Delashaun Dean	3 receptions, 24 yards
Nebraska	Passing	Zac Lee	13/23, 173 yards, TD
Nebraska	Rushing	Rex Burkhead	17 carries, 92 yards, TD
Nebraska	Receiving	Niles Paul	4 receptions, 123 yards, TD

Nebraska wide receiver Niles Paul was named Offensive MVP.

Nebraska safety Matt O'Hanlon was named Defensive MVP.

The Cornhuskers, coming off a heartbreaking loss to Texas in the 2009 Big 12 Championship Game (thereby missing a chance at a BCS bowl game berth), defeated the Wildcats 33–0 for the first shutout in the history of the Holiday Bowl. This was a rematch of the two teams, who faced each other in the 1998 Holiday Bowl, where Arizona defeated Nebraska 23–20.

The Wildcats were held to just 109 total yards of offense and just 6 first downs. The 'Huskers were led on offense by WR Niles Paul who had 4 catches for 123 yards, including a touchdown, which accounted for 74 of his receiving yards. Quarterback Zac Lee threw for 173 yards and the touchdown to Paul. Rex Burkhead of Nebraska led all rushers with 89 yards and a touchdown on 17 carries. This also marked the first time in Nebraska's 46 game, bowl game history that it has shut out a team in postseason. However, this was the third time in Arizona's bowl history that they have been shut out, the second time in a game in San Diego. The Wildcats lost the 1921 San Diego East-West Christmas Classic to Centre College 38–0 and the 1990 Aloha Bowl to Syracuse 28–0. Prior to the 2009 Holiday Bowl no team had scored less than 10 points in a game. The game also marked Nebraska's first 10-win season since 2003.

== Notes ==
- Up until this season, Arizona was one of only two Pacific-10 Conference teams that had not beaten USC during the Pete Carroll era.

== Awards and honors ==
All-Pacific-10 Conference Team:

- Second Team: OL Colin Baxter; OL Adam Grant; DL Earl Mitchell; LB Xavier Kelley; DB Trevin Wade
- Honorable mention: DE Ricky Elmore; QB Nick Foles; CB Devin Ross; MLB Vuna Tuihalamaka
