= Keith Smith (quarterback) =

American gridiron football player (born 1976)

Profile
- Position: Quarterback

Personal information
- Born: October 5, 1976 (age 50); Santa Barbara, California, U.S.

Career information
- College: Arizona

Career history
- 2001: Saskatchewan Roughriders
- 2003: Calgary Stampeders

Career statistics
- TD–INT: 4–9
- Passing yards: 1,008

Keith Alfred Smith (born October 5, 1976) is an American former professional football quarterback in the Canadian Football League (CFL). He played for the Saskatchewan Roughriders and Calgary Stampeders. He played college football at Arizona.

Prior to his college career, he was selected by the Detroit Tigers in the fifth round of the 1994 Major League Baseball draft and played one season in the Tigers organization as a shortstop.
