= Keith Hartwig =

American football player (born 1953)

No. 82
- Position: Wide receiver

Personal information
- Born: December 10, 1953 (age 72); Corona del Mar, California, U.S.
- Listed height: 6 ft 0 in (1.83 m)
- Listed weight: 186 lb (84 kg)

Career information
- High school: Central (California)
- College: Arizona (1972–1976)
- NFL draft: 1977: 11th round, 306th overall pick

Career history
- Minnesota Vikings (1977)*; Green Bay Packers (1977-1978)
- * Offseason or practice squad member only

Career NFL statistics
- Games played: 4
- Stats at Pro Football Reference

Malcolm Keith Hartwig (born December 10, 1953) is an American former professional football player who was a wide receiver in the National Football League (NFL). He played college football for the Arizona Wildcats and later spent the 1977 season in the NFL with the Minnesota Vikings and Green Bay Packers. He retired prior to the 1978 season.

== Early life ==
Hartwig was born on December 10, 1953, in Corona del Mar, Newport Beach, California. He attended Central High School in Fresno, California, and is one of four of their alumni to make it to the NFL. He was standout in football and played at wide receiver, end and safety. As a junior, he was a first-team all-league selection on both offense and defense. Near the end of the season, however, he suffered a "shattered knee" and was told it would end his career. Despite his injury, Hartwig was able to return for the following season and earned all-metro honors as well as an all-league selection; he was also invited to play in the Central California All-Star Game. Hartwig also played basketball and baseball at Central High School, being named an all-county shortstop in the latter in his final season.

== College career ==
Hartwig received little attention as a college football recruit but was able to join the University of Arizona after an "extensive letter writing campaign" led by one of his coaches. He played for the freshman team in 1972 but saw limited playing time, only catching a touchdown pass in the last game of the season. He entered his sophomore year as a second-string at his position (behind Scott Piper), but soon after suffered an ankle injury that ended his season and caused him to redshirt.

Hartwig remained a backup to Piper in 1974 and again saw little action. He began to see more playing time in 1975 when the team went with a three-receiver lineup, and he finished the season with 12 receptions for 210 yards and one touchdown (a 54-yard catch against UTEP) in 11 games played, averaging 17.5 yards-per-catch. After having been a backup to Piper for three years, Hartwig received a chance to start in 1976 after the former's graduation. He became one of the top receivers in the Western Athletic Conference (WAC) and led the WAC in receptions with 54, totaling 1,134 receiving yards and 10 touchdowns (an average of 21.0 yards-per-catch) on his way to being named all-conference and third-team All-American. His performance set three school records (single-season yards-per-reception, career yards-per-reception and single-season yards) and after the year he was chosen to play in the Blue–Gray Football Classic.

== Professional career ==
Hartwig was selected in the 11th round (306th overall) of the 1977 NFL draft by the Minnesota Vikings. He was injured in preseason and subsequently released.

After an injury to Gary Weaver, the Green Bay Packers signed Hartwig as a replacement at the start of November 1977. He was on the active roster for the final seven games of the season and appeared in a total of four, seeing action mainly on special teams; he recorded no statistics. He announced his retirement prior to the start of the 1978 season due to an arthritic condition in his knee.

== Personal life ==
Hartwig married Mary Frances Evans in June 1974.
