= Hubie Oliver =

American football player (born 1957)

No. 34, 30, 39
- Position: Running back

Personal information
- Born: November 12, 1957 (age 68); Elyria, Ohio, U.S.
- Listed height: 5 ft 10 in (1.78 m)
- Listed weight: 215 lb (98 kg)

Career information
- High school: Elyria
- College: Arizona
- NFL draft: 1981: 10th round, 275th overall pick

Career history
- Philadelphia Eagles (1981–1985); Indianapolis Colts (1986); Houston Oilers (1986)

Awards and highlights
- 2× Second-team All-Pac-10 (1978, 1979)

Career NFL statistics
- Rushing yards: 1,030
- Rushing average: 3.8
- Touchdowns: 4
- Stats at Pro Football Reference

Hubie Oliver (born November 12, 1957) is an American former professional football player who was a running back in the National Football League (NFL). He played college football for the Arizona Wildcats and was selected 275th overall by the Philadelphia Eagles in the 10th round of the 1981 NFL draft. Oliver also played in the NFL or the Indianapolis Colts and Houston Oilers.
