= Nic Grigsby =

American gridiron football player (born 1988)

No. 2, 32, 23
- Position: Running back

Personal information
- Born: December 26, 1988 (age 37); Los Angeles, California, U.S.
- Listed height: 5 ft 11 in (1.80 m)
- Listed weight: 195 lb (88 kg)

Career information
- College: Arizona

Career history
- 2011: Miami Dolphins*
- 2011: Oakland Raiders*
- 2011: Tampa Bay Buccaneers*
- 2012: BC Lions*
- 2012: Las Vegas Locomotives
- 2014: Winnipeg Blue Bombers
- 2014–2015: Hamilton Tiger-Cats
- 2015: Edmonton Eskimos*
- 2016: Ottawa Redblacks
- * Offseason or practice squad member only

Awards and highlights
- Grey Cup champion (2015); CFL East All-Star (2014)
- Stats at CFL.ca

Nicolas Grigsby (born December 26, 1988) is an American former professional football running back who played in the Canadian Football League (CFL). He played college football at Arizona.

== College career ==
Grigsby played college football at the University of Arizona from 2007 to 2010. During his career he rushed for 2,957 yards on 572 carries with 28 touchdowns.

In 2013, he returned to college to play college baseball at Arizona Christian University.

== Professional career ==
=== NFL ===
Grigsby signed with the Miami Dolphins as an undrafted free agent on July 26, 2011. He also spent time on the Oakland Raiders and Tampa Bay Buccaneers practice squad.

=== CFL ===
Grigsby then signed with the BC Lions of the Canadian Football League in May 2012. He was released by the Lions in June.

After spending a year in Arizona playing baseball, Grigsby returned to football signing with the Winnipeg Blue Bombers in 2014. In his CFL debut he rushed for 122 yards on 21 carries. On October 15, 2014, he was released from the Winnipeg Blue Bombers, one week after he was demoted from starting running back. The starting running back duties were given to Paris Cotton. At the time of his release, Nic Grigsby led the CFL with 9 touchdowns and was the fourth leading rusher, rushing for 744 yards. Aside from his great opening game, Grigsby averaged only 47.9 rushing yards per game in the following 13 games with the Blue Bombers.

On October 21, 2014, Grigsby signed with the Hamilton Tiger-Cats. He played in 3 regular season games with the Ti-Cats, and both playoff games. In the regular season Grigsby totaled 146 rushing yards on 30 carries and 1 rushing touchdown. In late February the Ti-Cats and Grigsby announced a contract extension.

On July 14, 2015, Grigsby was released by the Hamilton Tiger-Cats. He was signed by the Edmonton Eskimos for the remainder of the 2015 CFL season, however he did not appear in any games. Grigsby was released by the Eskimos on May 3, 2016.

Grigsby was signed to the Ottawa Redblacks practice roster on July 4, 2016. He appeared in 5 games for the Redblacks carrying the ball 59 times for 265 yards (4.5 yards per carry) with 1 rushing touchdown. Grigsby was released August 17, 2016.
