= Ricky Elmore =

American football player (born 1988)

No. 57, 50, 51
- Position: Linebacker

Personal information
- Born: February 1, 1988 (age 38); Simi Valley, California, U.S.
- Listed height: 6 ft 4 in (1.93 m)
- Listed weight: 255 lb (116 kg)

Career information
- High school: Grace Brethren (Simi Valley)
- College: Arizona
- NFL draft: 2011: 6th round, 197th overall pick

Career history
- Green Bay Packers (2011)*; San Francisco 49ers (2011)*; San Diego Chargers (2012)*; Arizona Cardinals (2012)*; Cleveland Browns (2012)*; Washington Redskins (2013)*
- * Offseason or practice squad member only

Awards and highlights
- Second-team All-Pac-10 (2010)
- Stats at Pro Football Reference

Rick Steven Elmore (born February 1, 1988) is an American former professional football player who was a linebacker in the National Football League (NFL). He played college football for the Arizona Wildcats. Elmore was selected by the Green Bay Packers in the sixth round of the 2011 NFL draft.

== College career ==
Elmore racked up 128 tackles (33 for loss) and 25 sacks during his college career at Arizona.

== Professional career ==
Pre-draft measurables
Height	Weight	Arm length	Hand span	Wingspan	40-yard dash	10-yard split	20-yard split	20-yard shuttle	Three-cone drill	Vertical jump	Broad jump	Bench press
6 ft 4 1/2 in (1.94 m)	255 lb (116 kg)	31 in (0.79 m)	9 3/4 in (0.25 m)	6 ft 4 in (1.93 m)	4.84 s	1.65 s	2.78 s	4.32 s	7.25 s	34.5 in (0.88 m)	9 ft 7 in (2.92 m)	26 reps
All values from NFL Combine/Pro Day

=== Green Bay Packers ===
The Green Bay Packers selected Elmore with the 197th overall pick (6th round) of the 2011 NFL draft. He was cut by the Packers on September 3, 2011.

=== San Francisco 49ers ===
Elmore was signed by the San Francisco 49ers to their practice squad on January 5, 2012.

=== San Diego Chargers ===
Elmore was signed by the San Diego Chargers on February 6, 2012. he was waived on August 31, 2012.

=== Arizona Cardinals ===
Elmore was signed by the Arizona Cardinals to their practice squad on September 3, 2012. He was waived on September 25, 2012.

=== Cleveland Browns ===
Elmore was signed by the Cleveland Browns to their practice squad on November 13, 2012.

=== Washington Redskins ===
Elmore was signed by the Washington Redskins to a futures/reserve contract on January 4, 2013. He was cut by the Redskins on August 26, 2013.

== Personal life ==
Along with his twin brother Cory, he appeared in the movie Easy Wheels as a baby.
