= Trung Canidate =

American football player (born 1977)

No. 24, 30
- Position: Running back

Personal information
- Born: March 3, 1977 (age 49); Phoenix, Arizona, U.S.
- Listed height: 5 ft 11 in (1.80 m)
- Listed weight: 205 lb (93 kg)

Career information
- High school: Central (Phoenix)
- College: Arizona (1995–1999)
- NFL draft: 2000: 1st round, 31st overall pick

Career history
- St. Louis Rams (2000–2002); Washington Redskins (2003)

Awards and highlights
- 2× Third-team All-American (1998, 1999); 2× First-team All-Pac-10 (1998, 1999)

Career NFL statistics
- Rushing yards: 1,095
- Rushing average: 4.6
- Rushing touchdowns: 7
- Receptions: 32
- Receiving yards: 260
- Receiving touchdowns: 1
- Stats at Pro Football Reference

Trung Jered Canidate (born March 3, 1977) is an American former professional football player who was a running back in the National Football League (NFL), primarily with the St. Louis Rams. He played college football for the Arizona Wildcats and was selected by the Rams in the first round of the 2000 NFL draft with the 31st overall pick.

== Professional career ==
=== Pre-draft ===
Pre-draft measurables
Height	Weight	40-yard dash	10-yard split	20-yard split	Bench press
5 ft 10 5/8 in (1.79 m)	193 lb (88 kg)	4.41 s	1.51 s	2.52 s	18 reps
All from NFL Combine.

The St. Louis Rams timed Canidate at 4.25 seconds in the 40-yard dash, more than .15 faster than his combine time. At the combine, Canidate did not complete his workout due to an ankle sprain.

=== St. Louis Rams ===
With the presence on the Rams' roster of Marshall Faulk, 1999 NFL Offensive MVP, there was much confusion with the selection of Canidate and most fans thought it was wasted. He started only three games in his three seasons with St. Louis; he was drafted for his quickness and speed, but he was undersized and perceived as fumble-prone. He fumbled on 1.6% of his touches in his career, compared to a league average rate of 1.37% of touches.

=== Washington Redskins ===
After the 2002 season, St. Louis traded Canidate to the Washington Redskins for David Loverne and a fourth round draft choice. There, he won the starting spot and started ten games, gaining 600 rushing yards and one touchdown. The next season, the Redskins traded Champ Bailey for all-star running back Clinton Portis, and Canidate was released in June 2004.

=== NFL statistics ===
Year	Team	Games		Rushing					Receiving					Fumbles	
Year	Team	GP	GS	Att	Yds	Avg	Lng	TD	Rec	Yds	Avg	Lng	TD	Fum	Lost
2000	STL	3	0	3	6	2.0	3	0	1	4	4.0	4	0	0	0
2001	STL	16	2	78	441	5.7	45	6	17	154	9.1	29	0	3	1
2002	STL	16	1	17	48	2.8	22	0	4	31	7.8	13	0	1	1
2003	WAS	11	10	142	600	4.2	38	1	10	71	7.1	25	1	1	0
Total		46	13	240	1,095	4.6	45	7	32	260	8.1	29	1	5	2
