= Scott Piper =

American football player (born 1954)

No. 82
- Position: Wide receiver

Personal information
- Born: June 18, 1954 (age 72); Philadelphia, Pennsylvania, U.S.
- Listed height: 6 ft 1 in (1.85 m)
- Listed weight: 180 lb (82 kg)

Career information
- High school: Lakewood (CO)
- College: Arizona
- NFL draft: 1976: 6th round, 171st overall pick

Career history
- Atlanta Falcons (1976)
- Stats at Pro Football Reference

Scott Piper (born June 18, 1954) is an American former professional football player who was a wide receiver for the Atlanta Falcons of the National Football League (NFL) in 1976. He played college football for the Arizona Wildcats. Piper signed with the Denver Broncos in 1979 and suffered a career ending knee injury.

In 2015 he was cast as “officer Gregg Knox” in “The 2nd Greatest”, followed by “Coach Simms” in the 2017 film “ A High School Story”.
