= Chuck Osborne (American football) =

American football player (1973–2012)

- Osborne in 2000

No. 97, 98
- Position: Defensive tackle

Personal information
- Born: November 2, 1973; Los Angeles, California, U.S.
- Died: October 16, 2012 (aged 38); La Jolla, California, U.S.
- Listed height: 6 ft 2 in (1.88 m)
- Listed weight: 290 lb (132 kg)

Career information
- High school: Canyon (Santa Clarita, California)
- College: Arizona (1992–1995)
- NFL draft: 1996: 7th round, 222nd overall pick

Career history
- St. Louis Rams (1996); Amsterdam Admirals (1998); Oakland Raiders (1998–1999); Green Bay Packers (2000); New England Patriots (2000); Georgia Force (2002)*
- * Offseason or practice squad member only

Awards and highlights
- First-team All-Pac-10 (1995)

Career NFL statistics
- Tackles: 28
- Sacks: 2
- Forced fumbles: 1
- Stats at Pro Football Reference

Charles Wayne Osborne Jr. (November 2, 1973 – October 16, 2012) was an American professional football defensive tackle who played three seasons in the National Football League (NFL) with the St. Louis Rams and Oakland Raiders. He was selected by the Rams in the seventh round of the 1996 NFL draft. He played college football at the University of Arizona. Osborne was also a member of the Amsterdam Admirals, Green Bay Packers, New England Patriots, and Georgia Force.

== Early life ==
Charles Wayne Osborne Jr. was born on November 2, 1973, in Los Angeles, California. He played high school football at Canyon High School in Santa Clarita, California as a defensive tackle.

== College career ==
Osborne was a four-year letterman for the Arizona Wildcats of the University of Arizona from 1992 to 1995. He was a member of Arizona's famed "Desert Swarm" defense. He led the team with 11 sacks in 1994 and finished his college career with 21. He was named first-team All-Pac-10 by the Coaches his senior year in 1995.

== Professional career ==
During the 1996 NFL Combine, Osborne had 33 reps at 225 pounds in the bench press. He was selected by the St. Louis Rams in the seventh round, with the 222nd overall pick, of the 1996 NFL draft. He officially signed with the team on June 27. He played in 15 games, starting one, for the Rams during the 1996 season, recording 11 solo tackles, one sack, and one forced fumble. He was released on August 19, 1997.

Osborne played for the Amsterdam Admirals during the 1998 NFL Europe season, accumulating 20 defensive tackles, eight sacks, one forced fumble, and two pass breakups.

Osborne signed with the Oakland Raiders on June 24, 1998. He appeared in six games for the Raiders in 1998, totaling three solo tackles and one assisted tackle, before being placed on injured reserve on October 21, 1998. He played in all 16 games during the 1999 season, totaling seven solo tackles, six assisted tackles, one sack, and one pass breakup. He was released on August 27, 2000.

Osborne was signed by the Green Bay Packers on September 27, 2000. He was soon released on October 11, 2000.

He signed with the New England Patriots on December 13, 2000. He was released on August 1, 2001.

Osborne signed with the Georgia Force of the Arena Football League on March 6, 2002. He was placed on the physically unable to perform list on March 24, and was waived on April 15, 2002.

== Personal life ==
Osborne died at his home in La Jolla, California on October 16, 2012. His cause of death was listed as "CTE and obesity-related hypertensive cardiomyopathy." He is one of at least 345 NFL players to be diagnosed after death with CTE, which is caused by repeated hits to the head.
