= Steve McLaughlin =

American football player (born 1971)

No. 3, 15
- Position: Placekicker

Personal information
- Born: October 2, 1971 (age 55); Tucson, Arizona, U.S.
- Listed height: 6 ft 1 in (1.85 m)
- Listed weight: 190 lb (86 kg)

Career information
- High school: Sahuaro (Tucson)
- College: Arizona (1991–1994)
- NFL draft: 1995: 3rd round, 82nd overall pick

Career history
- St. Louis Rams (1995); Atlanta Falcons (1996)*; Baltimore Ravens (1997)*; Portland Forest Dragons (1998); Nashville Kats (1998–2001); Buffalo Destroyers (2002); Georgia Force (2003–2005); Orlando Predators (2005); Arizona Rattlers (2005)
- * Offseason or practice squad member only

Awards and highlights
- Lou Groza Award (1994); Consensus All-American (1994); First-team All-Pac-10 (1994); Arizona Wildcats Jersey No. 28 retired

Career NFL statistics
- Field goals attempted: 16
- Field goals made: 8
- Field goal percentage: 50%
- Longest field goal: 45
- Extra points attempted: 17
- Extra points made: 17
- Points scored: 41
- Stats at Pro Football Reference

Career AFL statistics
- Field goals attempted: 224
- Field goals made: 94
- Field goal percentage: 41.9%
- Extra points attempted: 669
- Extra points made: 510
- Stats at ArenaFan.com

Steven John McLaughlin (born October 2, 1971) is an American former professional football player who was a placekicker in the National Football League (NFL) and the Arena Football League (AFL). He played college football for the Arizona Wildcats, earned All-American honors and won the Lou Groza Award. He was selected by the St. Louis Rams in the third round of the 1995 NFL draft. He also played for five different arena football teams over an 11-year career.

== Early life ==
McLaughlin was born in Tucson, Arizona. After playing soccer growing up, he attended Sahuaro High School in Tucson, and played for the Sahuaro Cougars high school football team.

== College career ==
While attending the University of Arizona, McLaughlin played for the Arizona Wildcats football team from 1990 to 1994. As a senior in 1994, he won the Lou Groza Award awarded annually to the outstanding college placekicker in America. He was also recognized as All-Pac-10 and consensus first-team All-American.

== Professional career ==
The St. Louis Rams selected McLaughlin in the third round (82nd pick overall), McLaughlin played for the Rams in 1995, He was signed by the Atlanta Falcons in 1996 and the Baltimore Ravens in 1997.

McLaughlin subsequently played for 8 seasons in the AFL with 5 different Arena Football League teams: the Nashville Kats from 1998 to 2001; Buffalo Destroyers in 2002; the Georgia Force from 2003 to 2005; the Orlando Predators in 2005; and the Arizona Rattlers in 2005. He played in two Arena Bowls with the Nashville Kats and was named 2nd Team All-Arena in 2002 with the Buffalo Destroyers.

== Band ==
McLaughlin formed a band in college named "Pet The Fish" opening for acts such as Weezer and Dave Mathews Band. The band broke Up shortly before his NFL and AFL career however in 2010 released a solo album under the band name "Steve McLaughlin" titled "No More Record Stores." It was mixed by legendary producer Clif Norrell at Casa Zuma Studios in Malibu, CA. One of the tracks circulated on a Right Choice Ford commercial appearing in spots on TV and cinema in the US and Mexico.
