= Charles McKee (American football) =

American football player (born 1950)

Profile
- Position: Wide receiver

Personal information
- Born: February 2, 1950 (age 76)
- Listed height: 6 ft 3 in (1.91 m)
- Listed weight: 190 lb (86 kg)

Career information
- High school: Phoenix (AZ) Union
- College: Arizona
- NFL draft: 1972: 2nd round, 52nd overall pick

Career history
- Dallas Cowboys (1972)*; Minnesota Vikings (1972); New England Patriots (1972)*; Detroit Wheels (1974); Denver Broncos (1975)*; New York Jets (1975)*
- * Offseason or practice squad member only

Charles McKee (born February 2, 1950) is an American former football wide receiver in the National Football League (NFL) for the Minnesota Vikings and New England Patriots. He also was a member of the Detroit Wheels of the World Football League (WFL). He was selected by the Dallas Cowboys in the second round (52nd overall) of the 1972 NFL draft. He played college football at the University of Arizona.

== Early life ==
McKee attended Phoenix Union High School, where he practiced football and basketball. He accepted a football scholarship from the University of Arizona, finishing his career with 85 receptions for 1,652 receiving yards (school record) and 19 touchdowns (school record). His nickname was "Earl the Pearl".

As a junior, McKee was second on the team with 26 receptions for 496 yards and 9 touchdowns (led the team). As a senior, he was a co-captain and the team's deep threat, posting 43 receptions for 854 receiving yards (205 yards against Oregon State University) and 5 touchdowns. He also played in the Senior Bowl.

== Professional career ==
=== Dallas Cowboys ===
McKee was selected by the Dallas Cowboys in the second round (52nd overall) of the 1972 NFL draft. He had a disappointing training camp and was waived before the season started on September 11.

=== Minnesota Vikings ===
On September 19, 1972, McKee was claimed off waivers by the Minnesota Vikings and placed on the taxi squad. He was cut on October 20.

=== New England Patriots ===
On November 27, 1972, McKee was signed by the New England Patriots to the taxi squad. He was released on September 12, 1973.

=== Detroit Wheels ===
In 1974, McKee was signed by the Detroit Wheels of the World Football League. In the third game, he broke his right hand against The Hawaiians and was placed on the disabled list. For the season he posted 6 receptions for 91 yards (long of 46). After finishing in last place (1–13 record), the league folded the team.

=== Denver Broncos ===
In 1975, McKee signed with the Denver Broncos but was released on July 28.

=== New York Jets ===
On August 5, 1975, McKee was signed by the New York Jets and was released on August 11.
