= Juron Criner =

American gridiron football player (born 1989)

No. 84, 87
- Position: Wide receiver

Personal information
- Born: December 12, 1989 (age 36); Las Vegas, Nevada, U.S.
- Listed height: 6 ft 3 in (1.91 m)
- Listed weight: 220 lb (100 kg)

Career information
- High school: Canyon Springs (North Las Vegas, Nevada)
- College: Arizona
- NFL draft: 2012: 5th round, 168th overall pick

Career history
- Oakland Raiders (2012−2013); New York Giants (2014−2015)*; Ottawa Redblacks (2016−2017); Edmonton Eskimos (2018)
- * Offseason or practice squad member only

Awards and highlights
- Grey Cup champion (2016); First-team All-Pac-10 (2010); Second-team All-Pac-12 (2011)

Career NFL statistics
- Receptions: 19
- Receiving yards: 183
- Receiving touchdowns: 2
- Stats at Pro Football Reference
- Stats at CFL.ca

Juron Criner (born December 12, 1989) is an American former professional football player who was a wide receiver in the National Football League (NFL). He played college football for the Arizona Wildcats. He was a member of the NFL's Oakland Raiders and New York Giants, and also the Ottawa Redblacks and Edmonton Eskimos of the Canadian Football League (CFL).

== Early life ==
Born in Las Vegas, Nevada, Criner attended Canyon Springs High School.

== College career ==
Criner played college football at the University of Arizona. In 2008 as a freshman, Criner caught 8 passes for 88 yards and a touchdown in 13 games and 3 starts. As a sophomore in 2009, he caught 45 passes for 582 yards and 9 touchdowns over 13 games and 5 starts. Criner was injured prior to the 2010 season but did not miss any games as a result. As a junior in 2010, Criner caught 73 passes for 1,186 yards and 8 touchdowns prior to the bowl game. In a loss to Oregon State, Criner caught 12 passes for 179 and a touchdown.

== Professional career ==
=== Oakland Raiders ===
The Raiders selected Criner in the fifth round of the 2012 NFL draft with the 168th overall pick. He had 16 catches for 151 yards in 12 games as a rookie in the 2012 season.

He was inactive most of the 2013 season, seeing action in just one game against the Eagles where he caught three passes for 32 yards. He had been surpassed on the depth chart by rookie round seven pick, Brice Butler and then found himself behind Andre Holmes as well once Holmes returned from a 4-game suspension to begin the year. In the game against the Eagles in week nine he suffered an acromioclavicular joint sprain in his right shoulder. Shortly thereafter, on November 23, 2013, the Oakland Raiders placed him on injured reserve effectively ending his 2013 season. The Raiders waived Criner on August 26, 2014.

=== New York Giants ===
On September 24, 2014, Criner was signed to the New York Giants' practice squad. On September 1, 2015, he was waived by the Giants.

=== Ottawa Redblacks ===
On April 14, 2016, the Ottawa Redblacks of the Canadian Football League announced the signing of Criner in time for spring mini-camp. In his first year in the CFL, Criner played in 6 regular season games catching 12 passes for 269 yards with 1 touchdown. He caught 7 passes for 177 yards in Ottawa's two playoff games en route to winning the 104th Grey Cup.

=== Edmonton Eskimos ===
Criner signed with the Edmonton Eskimos on February 16, 2018. He was placed on the 6-game injured list on June 13, 2018.
