= 2014 Rose Bowl =

American college football game

2014 Rose Bowl presented by Vizio
- 100th Rose Bowl Game
Stanford Cardinal	Michigan State Spartans
(11–2)	(12–1)
Pac-12	Big Ten
20	24
Head coach: David Shaw	Head coach: Mark Dantonio
AP / Coaches / BCS; 5 / 7 / 5	AP / Coaches / BCS; 4 / 4 / 4
	1	2	3	4	Total
Stanford	10	7	0	3	20
Michigan State	0	14	3	7	24
- Date: January 1, 2014
- Season: 2013
- Stadium: Rose Bowl
- Location: Pasadena, California
- MVP: Offense: Connor Cook (QB, MSU); Defense: Kyler Elsworth (LB, MSU)
- Favorite: Stanford by 4.5
- National anthem: Merry Clayton, Lisa Fischer, Judith Hill and Darlene Love
- Referee: Mike Defee (Big 12)
- Halftime show: Michigan State University Spartan Marching Band; Stanford Band
- Attendance: 95,173
- Payout: US$23.9 million per team

United States TV coverage
- Network: ESPN and ESPN Radio
- Announcers: Brent Musburger (play-by-play); Kirk Herbstreit (analyst); Heather Cox and Tom Rinaldi (sideline) (ESPN); Bill Rosinski, David Norrie, and Joe Schad (ESPN Radio)
- Nielsen ratings: 10.2 (18.6 million viewers)

International TV coverage
- Network: ESPN Deportes

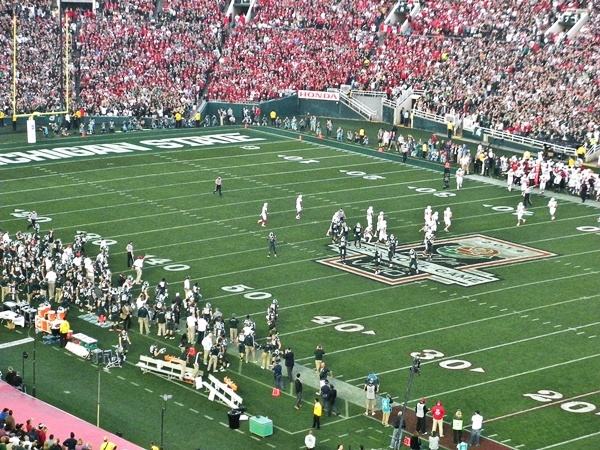
Michigan State defeated Stanford on January 1, 2014

The 2014 Rose Bowl was a college football bowl game that was played on January 1, 2014, at the Rose Bowl stadium in Pasadena, California. This 100th Rose Bowl Game matched Big Ten Conference Champions Michigan State Spartans against Pac-12 Conference champions Stanford Cardinal (the defending Rose Bowl champions). It was one of the 2013–14 bowl games that concluded the 2013 FBS football season. The first game in the final edition of the Bowl Championship Series, it was sponsored by the Vizio consumer electronics company, and officially titled the Rose Bowl Game presented by Vizio.

In a game dominated by both teams' rushing offense and strong defense, Michigan State defeated Stanford by a score of 24–20. It was only the Big Ten's second Rose Bowl victory since 2000.

The contest was televised on ESPN with a radio broadcast on ESPN Radio and XM Satellite Radio, which began at 1:30 p.m. (PST) with kickoff at 2:10 p.m. (PST). The Pasadena Tournament of Roses Association was the organizer of the game.

The Rose Bowl Game, themed Dreams Come True, was a contractual sell-out, with 64,500 tickets allocated to the participating teams and conferences. The remaining tickets went to the Tournament of Roses members, sponsors, City of Pasadena residents, and the general public. Tickets had a face value of $185 each, with end zone tickets selling at $150.

== Pre-game activities ==
The game was presided over by the 2014 Rose Queen Ana Marie Acosta, the Royal Court, Tournament of Roses President Scott Jenkins, and grand marshal Vin Scully.

After the teams' arrival in Southern California, the teams participated in the traditional Lawry's Beef Bowl in Beverly Hills and the Disney Media Day at Disneyland in nearby Anaheim. The Rose Bowl Hall of Fame ceremony luncheon was held prior to the game at the Pasadena Convention Center, where Lloyd Carr, Orlando Pace, and Lynn Swann were inducted into the hall.

The bands and cheerleaders from both schools participated in the pre-game Rose Parade on Colorado Boulevard in Pasadena, California along with the floats. Merry Clayton, Lisa Fischer, Judith Hill and Darlene Love kicked off the pre-game festivities.

== Teams ==
Teams playing in the Rose Bowl game are usually the winners of the Pac-12 and Big Ten conference championship games, unless one team (or both teams) play in the BCS National Championship game. The teams were officially selected by the football committee of the Pasadena Tournament of Roses Association on Selection Sunday on December 8, 2013.

On December 7, 2013, the Stanford Cardinal defeated Pac-12 South Division Champion Arizona State Sun Devils 38–14 for the Pac-12 Conference Championship, clinching their second straight Rose Bowl berth; The Cardinal won the Rose Bowl Game the previous season. Later that night, the Michigan State Spartans defeated the Ohio State Buckeyes in the 2013 Big Ten Football Championship Game 34–24 to become the Big Ten Conference Champions and were given a berth in the Rose Bowl game, their first since 1988.

The teams had met five times before, including the 1996 Sun Bowl won by Stanford 38–0. Michigan State led the series 3–2. Before the game, the teams held their pre-game practices at the StubHub Center in Carson, California. As the designated home team for the game, Michigan State wore its green home jerseys while Stanford wore its white away jerseys.

=== Michigan State ===
This was the 5th time Michigan State had played in the Rose Bowl game, where they are the winningest team from the Big Ten by win percentage, holding a 4–1 record; by contrast, the Big Ten as whole was 1–9 in the last 10 Rose Bowls. November has been good for the Spartans, winning 11 of the last 13 games (3–0 in 2010; 4–0 in 2011; 1–2 in 2012, 3–0 in 2013). The Spartans, led by seventh year coach Mark Dantonio, led the conference in scoring defense (16 touchdowns allowed), rushing defense (64.8 yards per game), total defense (237.7 yards per game) and pass defense (172.9 yard per game) during the regular season. Defensive end Shilique Calhoun finished second in the Big Ten Conference in sacks (7.5) and finished first in fumbles forced (4) and recovered (4). He was an Associated Press second-team All-American. Cornerback Darqueze Dennard was named a consensus first-team All-American and earned the Jim Thorpe Award, given to the nation's top defensive back. Offensively, the team was led by Jeremy Langford in rushing (269 carries for 1,338 yards, 4.97 avg., 17 TDs), Connor Cook in passing (201 of 344 for 2,423 yards, 20 TDs, 5 INTs), and Bennie Fowler in receiving (34 catches for 525 yards, 15.44 avg., 6 TDs).

=== Stanford ===
The Stanford Cardinal, who played in the first Rose Bowl in 1902, came back to the Rose Bowl for the second time in a row. For the fourth season in a row, the Cardinal had won 11 or more games. Led by LB Trent Murphy and LB Shayne Skov, the defense has allowed just 91.62 yards rushing (No. 3 in the FBS) and is averaging 3.08 sacks (tied for No. 1 in FBS). Offensively, Stanford was led by RB Tyler Gaffney, who gained 1,626 yards this season for 20 touchdowns; and WR Ty Montgomery, who has gained 161.0 all-purpose yards per game and scored 12 touchdowns. In the 24–10 win over UCLA, Gaffney carried 26 times for 171 yards; in the 26–20 win on Oregon, he carried 45 times for 157 yards; and in the Notre Dame game, he carried for 189 yards in 33 carries to defeat the Fighting Irish, 27–20.

== Game summary ==
=== First quarter ===
Stanford received the opening kickoff and on the second play from scrimmage, Kevin Hogan went deep and found Michael Rector for 43 yards, putting them immediately in Michigan State territory. Several plays later, Tyler Gaffney scored on a 16-yard run after a missed tackle by MSU safety Isaiah Lewis. Stanford took a 7–0 lead early in the first quarter. The Michigan State offense, led by Connor Cook, would be able to get into Stanford territory on their first 2 drives, but were unable to score on both attempts. Stanford would be able to add 3 points to its score near the end of the 1st quarter after a 47-yard run by Tyler Gaffney put them in field goal position. As the first quarter came to an end, Stanford held a 10–0 lead.

=== Second quarter ===
Michigan State had the ball to begin the second quarter. The Spartans moved the ball with efficiency and controlled the pace as a Tony Lippett reception of 24 yards put MSU in Stanford territory. The Michigan State offense appeared to have stalled at the Stanford 9 yard line, however, a pass interference penalty called on 3rd and goal against the Cardinal gave the Spartans a new set of downs. Jeremy Langford was then able to score on a 2-yard run, putting the score at 10–7. The remainder of the second quarter became a battle of field position, with both defenses setting the tone. With under 3 minutes left in the first half, Michigan State had good field position at their own 41 yard line after Stanford was forced to punt from their own endzone. On the second play of the possession, Connor Cook, while being hit, threw an ill-advised pass up for grabs and Stanford linebacker Kevin Anderson intercepted it, returning it 40 yards on a pick-six, expanding the Cardinal lead to 17–7.

With 2:07 remaining, the MSU offense took the field, fresh off a costly turnover. On 2nd and 10, a Connor Cook completion to Tony Lippett for 24 yards got them to mid-field. Another 2nd and 10 completion to Jeremy Langford went for 11 yards and put Michigan State in Stanford territory. One play later, Connor Cook saw man coverage and completed a 37-yard strike to 5th year senior Bennie Fowler, who made a challenging catch to put Michigan State at the Stanford 3 yard line. Several plays later, Cook, scrambling away from pressure, found fullback Trevon Pendleton for a touchdown, pulling the Spartans within 3. After receiving the kickoff, Stanford chose to run out the clock, maintaining a 17–14 halftime lead.

=== Third quarter ===
Michigan State would receive the second half kickoff and was able to tie the game on a Michael Geiger 31 yard field goal after a Bennie Fowler catch and run of 60 yards on the second play of the half put MSU in field goal position. With the game tied 17–17, Stanford received the ball. After an 11-yard completion to Ryan Hewitt, in a fashion similar to how the game started, Kevin Hogan went deep to Michael Rector again on 1st and 10, however, this time the ball was intercepted as Michigan State cornerback Trae Waynes took the ball away from Rector while the both of them were falling to the ground. On the ensuing Michigan State possession, the Cardinal defense stood tall, forcing a punt and giving their offense a second chance. Backed up at their own 7 yard line, the Stanford offense did not start off their drive as planned, as a botched handoff between Kevin Hogan and Tyler Gaffney almost resulted in what would have been a disastrous turnover. On 2nd down, Gaffney was tackled for a 1-yard loss. On 3rd and 11 with the ball at the Stanford 6 yard line, Kevin Hogan threw deep over the middle to tight end Devon Cajuste, which was caught for a 51-yard gain and put Stanford in Michigan State territory. A holding penalty called against Stanford (only the 3rd holding penalty called against the Cardinal offensive line all season) the next play made it 1st and 20. On 3rd and 17, Kevin Hogan took off on a 14-yard scramble to make a 4th down conversion seem manageable. On 4th and 3, Stanford turned the ball over on downs after Tyler Gaffney was tackled in the backfield for a 3-yard loss by senior Spartan linebacker Denicos Allen.

Trying to take advantage of the failed 4th down conversion, the Michigan State running game, which had been rather quiet for the majority of the game (Spartan running back Jeremy Langford had rushed for over 100 yards in 8 consecutive games before this game), started to gain momentum. Jeremy Langford ripped off 4 straight rushes for a combined 34 yards. Connor Cook then completed 2 passes for 15 yards and it was clear that the Michigan State offense had found a rhythm. However, while fighting for extra yardage on the next play, Langford was stripped of the football by Cardinal linebacker Shayne Skov, and Stanford recovered the ball at their own 8 yard line. After a quick possession, Stanford would have to punt the ball to begin the 4th quarter with the game tied 17–17.

=== Fourth quarter ===
A poor Stanford punt from their own 7 yard line and a 19-yard return from Macgarrett Kings gave Michigan State advantageous field position at the Cardinal 27 yard line. A rush for negative yardage and a false start penalty backed MSU up to the Stanford 34 yard line. On 2nd and 17, Connor Cook completed a 9-yard pass to tight end Josiah Price, making it 3rd and 8. Taking the shotgun snap, Connor Cook hit Tony Lippett over the middle for a 25-yard touchdown pass, giving Michigan State their first lead, 24–17. Stanford was unable to pick up a first down on their next possession and were forced to punt. The Michigan State offense did no better, after the offensive line allowed a sack on 3rd and long. After a 38-yard punt, Stanford got the ball back at their own 28 yard line, trailing by a touchdown.

On the first play of the possession, Michael Rector received the ball on an end-around and gained 27 yards, putting the Cardinal in Spartan territory at the MSU 45. A holding penalty called against All-American and Thorpe Award recipient Darqueze Dennard gave Stanford 10 free yards and put them in field goal position. On the field goal attempt, the hold was botched and chaos ensued, as the holder attempted to pick up the first down in a last-ditch effort by running, but then decided to throw for it as pressure was coming his way. He threw the ball up and linebacker Trent Murphy caught the ball for a first down. However, an ineligible receiver downfield penalty was called against Stanford and they had to attempt another field goal instead, this time from 39 yards away, which was good. Michigan State would receive the ball with a 24–20 lead with a little over 4 minutes remaining in the game. They were only able to take 1:09 off the clock and were forced to punt the ball back to Stanford.

With 3:06 remaining in the game, Stanford had the ball at their own 25 yard line. They ran the ball 3 straight times for 9 yards, with Kevin Hogan, Ricky Seale, and Tyler Gaffney as the respective ball carriers. With 1:46 remaining, Stanford head coach David Shaw took a timeout, knowing that he would have to go for it on 4th and 1 if Stanford were to have an opportunity to take the lead. After seeing what Stanford had lined up with, Michigan State head coach Mark Dantonio took a timeout of his own to assess the situation. It was a 4th and 1, short yardage situation at the Stanford 34 yard line. Kevin Hogan took the snap and handed it to the up-back Ryan Hewitt who was stopped for no gain as Spartan linebackers Kyler Elsworth and Darien Harris jumped over the middle of a mass pile of lineman to make the tackle. Elsworth, a former walk-on, was 2-time team captain Max Bullough's replacement. Stanford turned over the ball on downs for the second time and Michigan State ran out the clock from there, and with the victory secured their first 13 win season in school history and their first Rose Bowl win since 1988. Elsworth was named Defensive Player of the Game, and Connor Cook was named Offensive Player of the Game.

=== Scoring summary ===
Scoring summary

Quarter	Time	Drive			Team	Scoring information	Score	
Quarter	Time	Plays	Yards	TOP	Team	Scoring information	Stanford	Michigan State
1	11:16	7	77	3:44	Stanford	Tyler Gaffney 16-yard touchdown run, Jordan Williamson kick good	7	0
1	1:40	7	69	2:41	Stanford	34-yard field goal by Jordan Williamson	10	0
2	10:45	13	75	5:55	Michigan State	Jeremy Langford 2-yard touchdown run, Michael Geiger kick good	10	7
2	2:07				Stanford	Interception returned 40 yards for touchdown by Kevin Anderson, Jordan Williamson kick good	17	7
2	0:28	7	75	1:39	Michigan State	Trevon Pendleton 2-yard touchdown reception from Connor Cook, Michael Geiger kick good	17	14
3	12:56	6	61	2:04	Michigan State	31-yard field goal by Michael Geiger	17	17
4	13:22	3	27	1:28	Michigan State	Tony Lippett 25-yard touchdown reception from Connor Cook, Michael Geiger kick good	17	24
4	4:15	9	50	4:46	Stanford	39-yard field goal by Jordan Williamson	20	24
"TOP" = time of possession. For other American football terms, see Glossary of American football.							20	24

=== Statistics ===
Statistic	MSU	STAN
First downs	21	11
Total offense, plays – yards	71–397	54–305
Rushes-yards (net)	35–65 (1.9)	36–162 (4.5)
Passing yards (net)	332	143
Passes, Comp-Att-Int	22–36–1	10–18–1
Time of Possession	31:11	28:49

== Game notes ==
- April 23, 2013 – Tournament of Roses announced the creation of a special Rose Bowl Game trophy by Tiffany & Co. by adding 24k yellow gold vermeil accents to the twenty-one inches tall trophy, which features a ¾ size football rendered entirely in sterling silver. The 100th Rose Bowl Game Commemorative Book, written by Malcolm Moran, will also be released
- September 24, 2013 – The 100th Rose Bowl Game commemorative plaque was unveiled at the Rose Bowl Stadium by the Tournament of Roses
- December 8, 2013 – Rose Bowl All-Century Class, with representatives from each decade announced in association with the Football Writers Association of America
- December 25, 2013 – Michigan State captain Max Bullough was suspended for the Rose Bowl game for violating unspecified team rules
- January 1, 2014 – OLB Kevin Anderson's interception return for a touchdown was his first in his career, first in the Rose Bowl game since 2002; Magic Johnson, Condoleezza Rice, and former California Governor Gray Davis attended the game
- January 6, 2014 – The Pasadena Tournament of Roses Association will also play host to the 2014 BCS National Championship Game

== Related events ==
- Selection Sunday, December 8, 2013
- Lawry's Beef Bowl – December 27, 28, 2013
- Hall of Fame ceremony, Pasadena Convention Center, December 30, 2013
- Kickoff Luncheon, Rose Bowl, December 31, 2013
- Rose Bowl Game Public Tailgate, January 1, 2014
