= 2013 Pac-12 Football Championship Game =

- Conference Championship
Stanford Cardinal	Arizona State Sun Devils
(10–2)	(10–2)
38	14
Head coach: David Shaw	Head coach: Todd Graham
AP / Coaches / BCS; 7 / 10 / 7	AP / Coaches / BCS; 11 / 13 / 11
	1	2	3	4	Total
Stanford	14	14	3	7	38
Arizona State	7	7	0	0	14
- Date: December 7, 2013
- Season: 2013
- Stadium: Sun Devil Stadium
- Location: Tempe, AZ
- MVP: RB Tyler Gaffney, Stanford
- Favorite: Arizona State by 3
- Referee: Jay Stricherz
- Attendance: 69,535

United States TV coverage
- Network: ESPN (TV); ESPN Radio
- Announcers: Brad Nessler, Todd Blackledge & Holly Rowe (ESPN); Dave Flemming, David Norrie & Dave Shore (ESPN Radio)

2013 Pac-12 Conference football standings
	Conf.			Overall
Team	W		L	W		L
North Division
No. 11 Stanford xy$	7	–	2	11	–	3
No. 9 Oregon x	7	–	2	11	–	2
No. 25 Washington	5	–	4	9	–	4
Oregon State	4	–	5	7	–	6
Washington State	4	–	5	6	–	7
California	0	–	9	1	–	11
South Division
No. 21 Arizona State xy	8	–	1	10	–	4
No. 16 UCLA	6	–	3	10	–	3
No. 19 USC	6	–	3	10	–	4
Arizona	4	–	5	8	–	5
Utah	2	–	7	5	–	7
Colorado	1	–	8	4	–	8
Championship: Stanford 38, Arizona State 14
$ – BCS representative as conference champion; x – Division champion/co-champions; y – Championship game participant; Rankings from AP Poll

The 2013 Pac-12 Football Championship Game was played on Saturday, December 7, 2013 at Sun Devil Stadium in Tempe, Arizona, to determine the champion of the Pac-12 Conference in football for the 2013 season. North Division champion Stanford defeated South Division champion Arizona State to win their second consecutive Pac-12 title. The ESPN television networks broadcast the game, beginning at 4:45 p.m. PT/5:45 p.m. MT. Stanford went on to represent the Pac-12 Conference in the 2014 Rose Bowl Game.

== History ==
The game was the third edition of the Pac-12 Football Championship Game. The previous season, the Stanford Cardinal defeated the UCLA Bruins 27–24 to win the conference title and represent the Pac-12 in the 2013 Rose Bowl Game.

== Teams ==
=== Stanford ===
For the fourth season in a row, the Cardinal won 10 or more games. Led by LB Trent Murphy and LB Shayne Skov, the defense entered the game allowing just 87.3 yards rushing (3rd in FBS) and averaging 2.92 sacks (tied for 11th in FBS). Offensively, Stanford was led by RB Tyler Gaffney, who gained 1,485 yards this season for 17 touchdowns; and WR Ty Montgomery, who gained 161.9 all-purpose yards per game and scored 12 touchdowns.

=== Arizona State ===
Arizona State made its debut Pac-12 Championship game, having achieved its first 10-win season since 2007. During the regular season, the team outscored its opponents by 84 points and posted a 7-0 record when playing at home in Sun Devil Stadium.

== Scoring summary ==
1st quarter scoring: STAN – Tyler Gaffney 69-yard run (Jordan Williamson kick); ASU – D. J. Foster 51-yard run (Zane Gonzalez kick); STAN – Gaffney 1-yard run (Williamson kick)

2nd quarter scoring: STAN – Ty Montgomery 22-yard run (Williamson kick); STAN – Gaffney 1-yard run (Williamson kick); ASU – Foster 65-yard pass from Taylor Kelly (Gonzalez kick)

3rd quarter scoring: STAN – Williamson 30-yard field goal

4th quarter scoring: STAN – Montgomery 24-yard pass from Kevin Hogan (Williamson kick)

=== Statistics ===
Statistics	STAN	ASU
First downs	18	15
Total offense, plays – yards	62–517	68–311
Rushes-yards (net)	44–240	43–138
Passing yards (net)	277	173
Passes, Comp-Att-Int	12–18–0	17–25 –0
Time of Possession	33:39	26:21

== See also ==
- List of Pac-12 Conference football champions
