= 2013 California Golden Bears football team =

American college football season

2013 California Golden Bears football
- Conference: Pac-12 Conference
- North Division
- Record: 1–11 (0–9 Pac-12)
- Head coach: Sonny Dykes (1st season)
- Offensive coordinator: Tony Franklin (1st season)
- Offensive scheme: Bear raid
- Defensive coordinator: Andy Buh (1st season)
- Base defense: 4–3
- Home stadium: California Memorial Stadium

2013 Pac-12 Conference football standings
	Conf.			Overall
Team	W		L	W		L
North Division
No. 11 Stanford xy$	7	–	2	11	–	3
No. 9 Oregon x	7	–	2	11	–	2
No. 25 Washington	5	–	4	9	–	4
Oregon State	4	–	5	7	–	6
Washington State	4	–	5	6	–	7
California	0	–	9	1	–	11
South Division
No. 21 Arizona State xy	8	–	1	10	–	4
No. 16 UCLA	6	–	3	10	–	3
No. 19 USC	6	–	3	10	–	4
Arizona	4	–	5	8	–	5
Utah	2	–	7	5	–	7
Colorado	1	–	8	4	–	8
Championship: Stanford 38, Arizona State 14
$ – BCS representative as conference champion; x – Division champion/co-champions; y – Championship game participant; Rankings from AP Poll

The 2013 California Golden Bears football team represented the University of California, Berkeley in the 2013 NCAA Division I FBS football season. This was Cal's first year of being led by the head coach Sonny Dykes. Cal's athletic director Sandy Barbour stated that it was his emphasis on offense that was the primary factor in the decision. Dykes was hired from Louisiana Tech, and was known for his reliance on the pass heavy and high scoring Air Raid offense, that utilized a shotgun formation with four wide receivers. Cal finished this season with a 1–11 record, with Dykes becoming the first head coach since the University began playing football in 1886 to fail to defeat a single D-1 opponent in a season that has lasted at least five games. The Bears lost to Stanford by 50 points, the largest margin ever in the 119-year history of the Big Game. During the season, the team was featured on The Drive, a weekly documentary series on the Pac-12 Network.

One of the season's few positives was the performance of true freshman Jared Goff as the starting quarterback. Under Dyke's Air Raid offense, Goff delivered a record-breaking season, setting Cal single-season records for passing yards (3,508), yardage gained (3,508), total offense (3,446), passes completed (320), and passes attempted (530).

== Schedule ==
Date	Time	Opponent	Site	TV	Result	Attendance
August 31	7:30 p.m.	No. 22 Northwestern*	California Memorial Stadium; Berkeley, CA	ESPN2	L 30–44	58,816
September 7	2:00 p.m.	Portland State*	California Memorial Stadium; Berkeley, CA	P12N	W 37–30	43,594
September 14	4:00 p.m.	No. 4 Ohio State*	California Memorial Stadium; Berkeley, CA	FOX	L 34–52	62,467
September 28	7:30 p.m.	at No. 2 Oregon	Autzen Stadium; Eugene, OR	P12N	L 16–55	56,987
October 5	1:00 p.m.	Washington State^{†}	California Memorial Stadium; Berkeley, CA	FS1	L 22–44	44,682
October 12	7:30 p.m.	at No. 11 UCLA	Rose Bowl; Pasadena, CA (rivalry)	ESPN2	L 10–37	84,272
October 19	7:30 p.m.	Oregon State	California Memorial Stadium; Berkeley, CA	ESPN2	L 17–49	44,671
October 26	8:00 p.m.	at Washington	Husky Stadium; Seattle, WA	FS1	L 17–41	66,328
November 2	12:30 p.m.	Arizona	California Memorial Stadium; Berkeley, CA	P12N	L 28–33	41,874
November 9	12:00 p.m.	USC	California Memorial Stadium; Berkeley, CA (rivalry)	FOX	L 28–62	49,199
November 16	2:30 p.m.	at Colorado	Folsom Field; Boulder, CO	P12N	L 24–41	38,252
November 23	1:00 p.m.	at No. 10 Stanford	Stanford Stadium; Stanford, CA (Big Game)	FS1	L 13–63	50,424
*Non-conference game; ^{†}Homecoming; Rankings from AP Poll released prior to the game; All times are in Pacific time

== Game summaries ==
=== No. 22 Northwestern ===
	1	2	3	4	Total
No. 22 Wildcats	7	10	10	17	44
Golden Bears	7	3	14	6	30

Statistics	NW	CAL
First downs	22	30
Total yards	508	549
Rushing yards	209	89
Passing yards	299	460
Turnovers	3	3
Time of possession	29:35	30:25

Team	Category	Player	Statistics
Northwestern	Passing	Trevor Siemian	18/29, 276 yards, TD, 2 INT
Northwestern	Rushing	Treyvon Green	15 rushes, 129 yards, 2 TD
Northwestern	Receiving	Danny Vitale	5 receptions, 101 yards
California	Passing	Jared Goff	39/64, 450 yards, 2 TD, 3 INT
California	Rushing	Brendan Bigelow	15 rushes, 61 yards
California	Receiving	Chris Harper	11 receptions, 148 yards, 2 TD

=== Portland State ===
	1	2	3	4	Total
Vikings	14	9	7	0	30
Golden Bears	10	17	10	0	37

Statistics	PRST	CAL
First downs	23	31
Total yards	553	616
Rushing yards	245	131
Passing yards	308	485
Turnovers	2	1
Time of possession	27:43	32:17

Team	Category	Player	Statistics
Portland State	Passing	Kieran McDonagh	13/28, 308 yards, TD, INT
Portland State	Rushing	D. J. Adams	21 rushes, 139 yards, 3 TD
Portland State	Receiving	Kasey Closs	5 receptions, 160 yards, TD
California	Passing	Jared Goff	33/51, 485 yards, 2 TD
California	Rushing	Brendan Bigelow	18 rushes, 75 yards
California	Receiving	Bryce Treggs	8 receptions, 121 yards

=== No. 4 Ohio State ===
	1	2	3	4	Total
No. 4 Buckeyes	24	7	21	0	52
Golden Bears	14	6	7	7	34

Statistics	OSU	CAL
First downs	27	28
Total yards	608	503
Rushing yards	332	132
Passing yards	276	371
Turnovers	1	2
Time of possession	33:55	26:05

Team	Category	Player	Statistics
Ohio State	Passing	Kenny Guiton	21/32, 276 yards, 4 TD
Ohio State	Rushing	Jordan Hall	30 rushes, 168 yards, 3 TD
Ohio State	Receiving	Devin Smith	3 receptions, 149 yards, 2 TD
California	Passing	Jared Goff	31/53, 371 yards, 3 TD, INT
California	Rushing	Daniel Lasco	10 rushes, 64 yards, TD
California	Receiving	Chris Harper	6 receptions, 115 yards, TD

=== At No. 2 Oregon ===
	1	2	3	4	Total
Golden Bears	0	3	7	6	16
No. 2 Ducks	27	14	14	0	55

Statistics	CAL	ORE
First downs	20	21
Total yards	325	381
Rushing yards	149	264
Passing yards	176	117
Turnovers	5	2
Time of possession	31:20	28:40

Team	Category	Player	Statistics
California	Passing	Zach Kline	18/37, 165 yards, TD, INT
California	Rushing	Brendan Bigelow	18 rushes, 61 yards
California	Receiving	Richard Rodgers	2 receptions, 38 yards
Oregon	Passing	Marcus Mariota	11/25, 114 yards, 2 TD
Oregon	Rushing	Byron Marshall	19 rushes, 130 yards, 2 TD
Oregon	Receiving	Josh Huff	2 receptions, 44 yards, TD

=== Washington State ===
	1	2	3	4	Total
Cougars	14	7	14	9	44
Golden Bears	0	15	7	0	22

Statistics	WSU	CAL
First downs	27	26
Total yards	570	585
Rushing yards	49	64
Passing yards	521	521
Turnovers	1	5
Time of possession	32:45	27:15

Team	Category	Player	Statistics
Washington State	Passing	Connor Halliday	41/67, 521 yards, 3 TD, INT
Washington State	Rushing	Marcus Mason	7 rushes, 32 yards
Washington State	Receiving	Marcus Mason	4 receptions, 118 yards, TD
California	Passing	Jared Goff	33/59, 504 yards, 2 TD, INT
California	Rushing	Brendan Bigelow	12 rushes, 41 yards
California	Receiving	Chris Harper	14 receptions, 231 yards, TD

=== At No. 11 UCLA ===
	1	2	3	4	Total
Golden Bears	0	10	0	0	10
No. 11 Bruins	10	14	6	7	37

Statistics	CAL	UCLA
First downs	21	28
Total yards	320	488
Rushing yards	105	78
Passing yards	215	410
Turnovers	2	0
Time of possession	30:00	30:00

Team	Category	Player	Statistics
California	Passing	Jared Goff	26/43, 215 yards, INT
California	Rushing	Khalfani Muhammad	14 rushes, 63 yards
California	Receiving	Bryce Treggs	5 receptions, 42 yards
UCLA	Passing	Brett Hundley	31/41, 410 yards, 3 TD
UCLA	Rushing	Paul Perkins	14 rushes, 36 yards, TD
UCLA	Receiving	Devin Fuller	6 receptions, 98 yards, TD

=== Oregon State ===
	1	2	3	4	Total
Beavers	14	14	14	7	49
Golden Bears	3	0	7	7	17

Statistics	ORST	CAL
First downs	31	19
Total yards	496	291
Rushing yards	74	75
Passing yards	496	291
Turnovers	2	4
Time of possession	33:28	26:32

Team	Category	Player	Statistics
Oregon State	Passing	Sean Mannion	35/45, 481 yards, 4 TD
Oregon State	Rushing	Chris Brown	6 rushes, 36 yards
Oregon State	Receiving	Brandin Cooks	13 receptions, 232 yards, TD
California	Passing	Jared Goff	21/31, 220 yards, INT
California	Rushing	Darren Ervin	11 rushes, 40 yards
California	Receiving	Chris Harper	7 receptions, 93 yards

=== At Washington ===
	1	2	3	4	Total
Golden Bears	0	7	0	10	17
Huskies	17	7	14	3	41

Statistics	CAL	WASH
First downs	21	24
Total yards	483	642
Rushing yards	131	262
Passing yards	352	380
Turnovers	1	0
Time of possession	31:09	28:51

Team	Category	Player	Statistics
California	Passing	Jared Goff	32/54, 336 yards, TD
California	Rushing	Khalfani Muhammad	4 rushes, 90 yards, TD
California	Receiving	Chris Harper	6 receptions, 98 yards, TD
Washington	Passing	Keith Price	20/32, 376 yards, 2 TD
Washington	Rushing	Bishop Sankey	27 rushes, 241 yards, 2 TD
Washington	Receiving	Jaydon Mickens	6 receptions, 180 yards, 2 TD

=== Arizona ===
	1	2	3	4	Total
Wildcats	9	14	10	0	33
Golden Bears	7	7	7	7	28

Statistics	ARIZ	CAL
First downs	26	24
Total yards	448	419
Rushing yards	187	130
Passing yards	261	289
Turnovers	0	2
Time of possession	32:57	27:03

Team	Category	Player	Statistics
Arizona	Passing	B. J. Denker	24/38, 261 yards, TD
Arizona	Rushing	Ka'Deem Carey	32 rushes, 152 yards
Arizona	Receiving	Terrence Miller	5 receptions, 88 yards
California	Passing	Jared Goff	34/56, 289 yards, 4 TD, 2 INT
California	Rushing	Daniel Lasco	12 rushes, 71 yards
California	Receiving	Kenny Lawler	6 receptions, 72 yards, 3 TD

=== USC ===
	1	2	3	4	Total
Trojans	21	20	14	7	62
Golden Bears	0	14	7	7	28

Statistics	USC	CAL
First downs	20	30
Total yards	499	483
Rushing yards	256	190
Passing yards	243	293
Turnovers	0	0
Time of possession	24:01	35:59

Team	Category	Player	Statistics
USC	Passing	Cody Kessler	14/17, 170 yards, 2 TD
USC	Rushing	Javorius Allen	6 rushes, 135 yards, 2 TD
USC	Receiving	De’Von Flournoy	3 receptions, 63 yards
California	Passing	Jared Goff	35/49, 260 yards, 3 TD
California	Rushing	Khalfani Muhammad	10 rushes, 61 yards, TD
California	Receiving	Kenny Lawler	6 receptions, 54 yards, 2 TD

=== At Colorado ===
	1	2	3	4	Total
Golden Bears	0	10	0	14	24
Buffaloes	3	21	3	14	41

Statistics	CAL	COLO
First downs	23	23
Total yards	411	485
Rushing yards	197	121
Passing yards	214	364
Turnovers	2	1
Time of possession	27:19	32:36

Team	Category	Player	Statistics
California	Passing	Jared Goff	23/45, 173 yards, INT
California	Rushing	Brendan Bigelow	15 rushes, 107 yards, 2 TD
California	Receiving	Kenny Lawler	6 receptions, 81 yards
Colorado	Passing	Sefo Liufau	23/36, 364 yards, 3 TD, INT
Colorado	Rushing	Christian Powell	18 rushes, 60 yards, TD
Colorado	Receiving	Paul Richardson	11 receptions, 140 yards

=== At No. 10 Stanford ===
	1	2	3	4	Total
Golden Bears	10	3	0	0	13
No. 10 Cardinal	21	21	7	14	63

Statistics	CAL	STAN
First downs	18	25
Total yards	383	603
Rushing yards	73	186
Passing yards	310	417
Turnovers	1	1
Time of possession	28:14	31:46

Team	Category	Player	Statistics
California	Passing	Jared Goff	10/19, 194 yards, TD
California	Rushing	Khalfani Muhammad	5 rushes, 45 yards
California	Receiving	Richard Rodgers	5 receptions, 125 yards
Stanford	Passing	Kevin Hogan	17/26, 329 yards, 5 TD
Stanford	Rushing	Tyler Gaffney	16 rushes, 95 yards, TD
Stanford	Receiving	Ty Montgomery	5 receptions, 160 yards, 4 TD

In a 63–13 victory, #10 Stanford broke the record for most points scored in a Big Game and for the largest margin of victory at 50 points. With the victory, Stanford clinched the Pac-12 North Division Championship while Cal ended their season at 1–11, the most losses in one season in Cal football history.

== Awards ==
- September 2, 2013 – Vincenzo D'Amato, PK, was named Pac-12 Conference special teams player of the week
