= 2013 Stanford Cardinal football team =

American college football season

2013 Stanford Cardinal football

Pac-12 champion Pac-12 North Division co-champion

Pac-12 Championship Game, W 38–14 vs. Arizona State

Rose Bowl, L 20–24 vs. Michigan State
- Conference: Pac-12 Conference
- North Division

Ranking
- Coaches: No. 10
- AP: No. 11
- Record: 11–3 (7–2 Pac-12)
- Head coach: David Shaw (3rd season)
- Offensive coordinator: Mike Bloomgren (1st season)
- Offensive scheme: Multiple
- Defensive coordinator: Derek Mason (3rd season)
- Base defense: 3–4
- Home stadium: Stanford Stadium

2013 Pac-12 Conference football standings
	Conf.			Overall
Team	W		L	W		L
North Division
No. 11 Stanford xy$	7	–	2	11	–	3
No. 9 Oregon x	7	–	2	11	–	2
No. 25 Washington	5	–	4	9	–	4
Oregon State	4	–	5	7	–	6
Washington State	4	–	5	6	–	7
California	0	–	9	1	–	11
South Division
No. 21 Arizona State xy	8	–	1	10	–	4
No. 16 UCLA	6	–	3	10	–	3
No. 19 USC	6	–	3	10	–	4
Arizona	4	–	5	8	–	5
Utah	2	–	7	5	–	7
Colorado	1	–	8	4	–	8
Championship: Stanford 38, Arizona State 14
$ – BCS representative as conference champion; x – Division champion/co-champions; y – Championship game participant; Rankings from AP Poll

The 2013 Stanford Cardinal football team represented Stanford University in the 2013 NCAA Division I FBS football season. The Cardinal were led by third-year head coach David Shaw. They played their home games at Stanford Stadium and were members of the North Division of the Pac-12 Conference.

The Cardinal won the Pac-12 North division for the second straight year, advancing to the Pac-12 Football Championship Game, where they defeated the Arizona State Sun Devils 38–14. With the win, the Cardinal won the Pac-12 Championship for the second straight year and represented the conference in the 100th Rose Bowl Game against the Michigan State Spartans of the Big Ten Conference on New Year's Day, January 1, 2014, where they were defeated by the Spartans 24–20.

== Roster ==
2013 Stanford Cardinal roster
Quarterbacks: 2 Dallas Lloyd – (redshirt) Freshman; 5 Evan Crower – (redshirt) Sophomore; 8 Kevin Hogan – (redshirt) Sophomore; 10 David Olson – (redshirt) Sophomore; 17 Ryan Burns – Freshman; Running backs: 22 Remound Wright – (redshirt) Sophomore; 23 Jackson Cummings – (redshirt) Junior; 25 Tyler Gaffney – Senior; 26 Barry J. Sanders – (redshirt) Freshman; 30 Ricky Seale – (redshirt) Junior; 32 Anthony Wilkerson – Senior; 42 Pat McFadden – Freshman; 46 Ryan Gaertner – Freshman; Fullbacks: 24 Patrick Skov – (redshirt) Sophomore; 36 Lee Ward – (redshirt) Junior; 85 Ryan Hewitt – (redshirt) Senior; Centers: 52 Graham Shuler – (redshirt) Freshman; 61 Conor McFadden – (redshirt) Junior; 63 Kevin Reihner – (redshirt) Sophomore; 65 Khalil Wilkes – (redshirt) Senior; 69 Jim Grace – Freshman; Offensive Guards/Offensive tackles: 50 Cole Underwood – (redshirt) Junior OG; 51 Joshua Garnett – Sophomore OG; 54 David Yankey – (redshirt) Junior OG; 57 Johnny Caspers – (redshirt) Freshman OG; 60 Brian Moran – (redshirt) Sophomore OG/OT; 64 David Bright – Freshman OG/OT; 66 Nick Davidson – (redshirt) Sophomore OT; 70 Andrus Peat – Sophomore OT; 73 Cameron Fleming – (redshirt) Junior OT; 74 Brendon Austin – (redshirt) Sophomore OT; 75 Dillon Bonnell – (redshirt) Junior OG; 76 Kevin Danser – (redshirt) Senior OG; 77 Lucas Hinds – Freshman OT; 78 Kyle Murphy – Sophomore OT; 79 Thomas Oser – Freshman OG/OT	Wide receivers: 3 Michael Rector – (redshirt) Freshman; 4 Francis Owusu – Freshman; 6 Taijuan Thomas – Freshman; 7 Ty Montgomery – Junior; 9 Kodi Whitfield – Sophomore; 11 Dontonio Jordan – (redshirt) Freshman; 13 Rollins Stallworth – (redshirt) Sophomore; 18 Jeff Trojan – (redshirt) Junior; 20 Keanu Nelson – (redshirt) Junior; 38 Gautam Krishnamurthi – (redshirt) Sophomore; 39 Kelsey Young – (redshirt) Sophomore; 44 John Flacco – (redshirt) Junior; 81 Conner Crane – (redshirt) Freshman; 87 Jordan Pratt – (redshirt) Sophomore; 89 Devon Cajuste – (redshirt) Sophomore; Tight ends: 80 Eric Cotton – Freshman; 82 Alex Frkovic – (redshirt) Freshman; 82 Chris Harrell – (redshirt) Freshman; 83 Davis Dudchock – (redshirt) Junior; 84 Austin Hooper – Freshman; 86 Charlie Hopkins – (redshirt) Sophomore; 88 Greg Taboada – Freshman; 96 Eddie Plantaric – (redshirt) Junior; 99 Luke Kaumatule – (redshirt) Sophomore; Defensive tackles: 55 Nate Lohn – (redshirt) Freshman; 58 David Parry – (redshirt) Junior; 94 Ikenna Nwafor – (redshirt) Freshman; 95 Lance Callihan – (redshirt) Sophomore; 97 Anthony Hayes – (redshirt) Sophomore; Defensive ends: 7 Aziz Shittu – Sophomore; 49 Ben Gardner – (redshirt) Senior; 72 J.B. Salem – (redshirt) Sophomore; 75 Jordan Watkins – (redshirt) Freshman; 79 Alex Yazdi – (redshirt) Sophomore; 90 Josh Mauro – (redshirt) Senior; 91 Henry Anderson – (redshirt) Junior	Linebackers: 3 Noor Davis – (redshirt) Freshman OLB; 4 Blake Martinez – Sophomore ILB; 9 James Vaughters – Junior OLB; 11 Shayne Skov – (redshirt) Senior ILB; 17 A. J. Tarpley – (redshirt) Junior ILB; 33 Mike Tyler – Freshman OLB; 34 Peter Kalambayi – Freshman OLB; 35 Jarek Lancaster – (redshirt) Senior ILB; 40 Joe Hemschoot – Junior ILB; 43 Blake Lueders – (redshirt) Junior OLB; 44 Kevin Palma – Freshman ILB; 48 Kevin Anderson – (redshirt) Sophomore OLB; 53 Torsten Rotto – (redshirt) Sophomore OLB; 59 Craig Jones – (redshirt) Freshman ILB; 67 Sam Shober – (redshirt) Freshman OLB; 68 Sam Yules – (redshirt) Freshman ILB; 93 Trent Murphy – (redshirt) Senior OLB; Defensive backs: 2 Wayne Lyons – Junior CB; 5 Devon Carrington – Senior FS; 8 Jordan Richards – Junior SS; 10 Zach Hoffpauir – Sophomore SS; 15 Usual Amanam – (redshirt) Senior NB; 22 Kyle Olugbode – (redshirt) Junior SS; 23 Ronnie Harris – (redshirt) Sophomore NB; 25 Alex Carter – Sophomore CB; 29 Ed Reynolds – (redshirt) Junior FS; 31 Barry Browning – Senior CB; 38 Ra'Chard Pippens – (redshirt) Sophomore CB; 41 Chandler Dorrell – Freshman DB; 45 Calvin Chandler – Freshman SS; Punters/Kickers: 14 Ben Rhyne – (redshirt) Junior P; 19 Jordan Williamson – (redshirt) Junior K; 34 Conrad Ukropina – (redshirt) Freshman P/K; 47 Alex Robinson – Freshman P; Long snappers: 62 Austin Tubbs – (redshirt) Sophomore; 67 Reed Miller – Sophomore
Source: 2013 Stanford Cardinal Football Roster

== Coaching staff ==
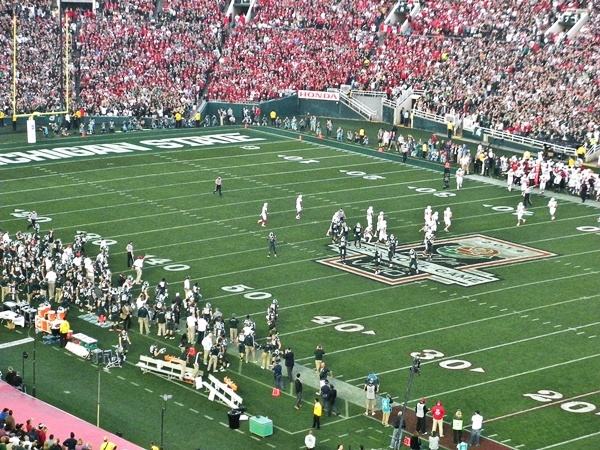
Michigan State defeated Stanford in the Rose Bowl Game on January 1, 2014

- David Shaw– Head coach (Bradford M. Freeman Director of Football)
- Derek Mason – Defensive coordinator (Willie Shaw Director of Defense)
- Mike Bloomgren – Offensive coordinator/offensive line (Andrew Luck Director of Offense)
- Pete Alamar – Special teams coordinator
- Lance Anderson – Outside linebackers/admissions liaison
- Mike Sanford Jr. – Quarterbacks/wide receivers/recruiting coordinator
- Randy Hart – Defensive line
- Dave Kotulski – Inside linebackers
- Tavita Pritchard – Running backs
- Morgan Turner – Tight ends
- Jarrett huk – Defensive assistant
- Vavae tata – Defensive assistant
- Derek Belch – Graduate assistant
- Greg mangan – Defensive graduate assistant
- Marc mattioli – Defensive graduate assistant
- Joseph ashfield – Offensive assistant
- Tsuyoshi kawata – Offensive assistant
- Timot lamarre – Offensive assistant
- Ron lynn – Director of player development
- Shannon turley – Kissick family director of football sports performance
- Steve bartlinski – Head football athletic trainer

== Schedule ==
Date	Time	Opponent	Rank	Site	TV	Result	Attendance
September 7	8:00 p.m.	San Jose State*	No. 5	Stanford Stadium; Stanford, CA (Bill Walsh Legacy Game)	P12N	W 34–13	50,424
September 14	9:00 a.m.	at Army*	No. 5	Michie Stadium; West Point, NY	CBSSN	W 34–20	39,644
September 21	4:00 p.m.	No. 23 Arizona State	No. 5	Stanford Stadium; Stanford, CA	FOX	W 42–28	50,424
September 28	7:00 p.m.	vs. Washington State	No. 5	CenturyLink Field; Seattle, WA	ESPN	W 55–17	40,095
October 5	7:30 p.m.	No. 15 Washington	No. 5	Stanford Stadium; Stanford, CA	ESPN	W 31–28	50,424
October 12	3:00 p.m.	at Utah	No. 5	Rice-Eccles Stadium; Salt Lake City, UT	P12N	L 21–27	45,372
October 19	12:30 p.m.	No. 9 UCLA^{†}	No. 13	Stanford Stadium; Stanford, CA (rivalry)	ABC	W 24–10	51,424
October 26	7:30 p.m.	at Oregon State	No. 8	Reser Stadium; Corvallis, OR	ESPN	W 20–12	44,519
November 7	6:00 p.m.	No. 2 Oregon	No. 6	Stanford Stadium; Stanford, CA (rivalry)	ESPN	W 26–20	51,545
November 16	5:00 p.m.	at USC	No. 5	Los Angeles Memorial Coliseum; Los Angeles, CA (rivalry) (College GameDay)	ABC	L 17–20	93,607
November 23	1:00 p.m.	California	No. 10	Stanford Stadium; Stanford, CA (116th Big Game/Stanford Axe)	FS1	W 63–13	50,424
November 30	4:00 p.m.	No. 25 Notre Dame*	No. 8	Stanford Stadium; Stanford, CA (Legends Trophy)	FOX	W 27–20	50,537
December 7	4:45 p.m.	at No. 11 Arizona State	No. 7	Sun Devil Stadium; Tempe, AZ (Pac-12 Championship Game)	ESPN	W 38–14	69,535
January 1, 2014	2:10 p.m.	vs. No. 4 Michigan State*	No. 5	Rose Bowl; Pasadena, CA (Rose Bowl) (College GameDay)	ESPN	L 20–24	95,173
*Non-conference game; ^{†}Homecoming; Rankings from AP Poll released prior to the game; All times are in Pacific time

== Game summaries ==
=== San Jose State ===
	1	2	3	4	Total
Spartans	3	3	7	0	13
#5 Cardinal	7	10	10	7	34

=== At Army ===
	1	2	3	4	Total
#5 Cardinal	7	13	7	7	34
Black Knights	6	7	0	7	20

=== No. 23 Arizona State ===
	1	2	3	4	Total
#23 Sun Devils	0	0	7	21	28
#5 Cardinal	13	16	10	3	42

=== At Washington State ===
	1	2	3	4	Total
#5 Cardinal	10	7	21	17	55
Cougars	3	0	0	14	17

=== No. 15 Washington ===
	1	2	3	4	Total
#15 Huskies	0	7	14	7	28
#5 Cardinal	7	10	14	0	31

=== At Utah ===
	1	2	3	4	Total
#5 Cardinal	14	0	0	7	21
Utes	14	7	3	3	27

1st quarter scoring: STAN – T. Gaffney 1-yard run (J. Williamson kick); UTAH – Karl Williams 4-yard pass from Travis Wilson (Andy Phillips kick); STAN – T. Montgomery 100-yard kickoff return (Williamson kick); UTAH – Dres Anderson 51-yard pass from Wilson (Phillips kick)

2nd quarter scoring: UTAH – Anderson 3-yard run (Phillips kick)

3rd quarter scoring: UTAH – Phillips 23-yard field goal

4th quarter scoring: UTAH – Phillips 48-yard field goal; STAN – D. Cajuste 7-yard pass from K. Hogan (Williamson kick)

=== No. 9 UCLA ===
	1	2	3	4	Total
#9 Bruins	0	0	3	7	10
#13 Cardinal	3	0	14	7	24

1st quarter scoring: STAN – Conrad Ukropina 31-yard field goal

2nd quarter scoring: No scoring

3rd quarter scoring: UCLA – Kaʻimi Fairbairn 38-yard field goal; STAN – Kodi Whitfield 30-yard pass from Kevin Hogan (Ukropina kick); STAN – Tyler Gaffney 1-yard run (Ukropina kick)

4th quarter scoring: UCLA – Shaquelle Evans 3-yard pass from Brett Hundley (Fairbairn kick); STAN – Gaffney 4-yard run (Ukropina kick)

=== At Oregon State ===
	1	2	3	4	Total
#8 Cardinal	0	7	6	7	20
Beavers	0	3	6	3	12

=== No. 2 Oregon ===
	1	2	3	4	Total
#2 Ducks	0	0	0	20	20
#6 Cardinal	7	10	6	3	26

Stanford leads the series with Oregon 45–30–1 (.599). The series started in 1900 at Stanford, Stanford 34, Oregon 0; the last meeting was the 2012 game at Oregon, Stanford 17, Oregon 14 (OT).

1st quarter scoring: STAN – Tyler Gaffney 2-yard run (Jordan Williamson kick)

2nd quarter scoring: STAN – Kevin Hogan 11-yard run (Williamson kick); STAN – Williamson 19-yard field goal

3rd quarter scoring: STAN – Williamson 34-yard field goal; STAN – Williamson 26-yard field goal

4th quarter scoring: STAN – Williamson 30-yard field goal; ORE – Daryle Hawkins 23-yard pass from Marcus Mariota (Matt Wogan kick); ORE – Rodney Hardrick 65-yard blocked field goal return (Two-point conversion failed); ORE – Pharaoh Brown 12-yard pass from Mariota (Wogan kick)

=== At USC ===
	1	2	3	4	Total
#5 Cardinal	7	3	7	0	17
Trojans	14	3	0	3	20

1st quarter scoring: USC – Soma Vainuku 1-yard pass from Cody Kessler (Andre Heidari kick failed); STAN – T. Gaffney 35-yard run (C. Ukropina kick); USC – Javorius Allen 1-yard run (Marqise Lee pass from Kessler)

2nd quarter scoring: USC – Heidari 23-yard field goal; STAN – Ukropina 27-yard field goal

3rd quarter scoring: STAN – Gaffney 18-yard run (Ukropina kick)

4th quarter scoring: USC – Heidari 47-yard field goal

=== California (The Big Game) ===
	1	2	3	4	Total
Golden Bears	10	3	0	0	13
#10 Cardinal	21	21	7	14	63

In a 63–13 victory, #10 Stanford broke the record for most points scored in a Big Game and for the largest margin of victory. With the victory, Stanford clinched the Pac-12 North Division Championship while Cal ended their season at 1–11, the most losses in one season in Cal football history.

1st quarter scoring: STAN – T. Montgomery 31-yard run (J. Williamson kick) CAL – Maurice Harris 15-yard pass from Goff, Jared (Vincen D’Amato kick); STAN – Montgomery 50-yard pass from K. Hogan (Williamson kick); STAN – Montgomery 12-yard pass from Hogan (Williamson kick); CAL – D’Amato 29-yard field goal

2nd quarter scoring: STAN – Montgomery 72-yard pass from Hogan (Williamson kick); STAN – M. Rector 45-yard pass from Hogan (Williamson kick); CAL – D’Amato 47-yard field goal; STAN – Montgomery 9-yard pass from Hogan (Williamson kick)

3rd quarter scoring: STAN – Gaffney, T 58-yard run (C. Ukropina kick)

4th quarter scoring: STAN – K. Young 27-yard run (Ukropina kick); STAN – F. Owusu 14-yard pass from E. Crower (Ukropina kick)

=== No. 25 Notre Dame ===
	1	2	3	4	Total
#25 Fighting Irish	3	3	14	0	20
#8 Cardinal	7	7	10	3	27

=== At No. 11 Arizona State (Pac-12 Championship game) ===
	1	2	3	4	Total
#7 Cardinal	14	14	3	7	38
#11 Sun Devils	7	7	0	0	14

1st quarter scoring: STAN – Tyler Gaffney 69-yard run (Jordan Williamson kick); ASU – D. J. Foster 51-yard run (Zane Gonzalez kick); STAN – Gaffney 1-yard run (Williamson kick)

2nd quarter scoring: STAN – Ty Montgomery 22-yard run (Williamson kick); STAN – Gaffney 1-yard run (Williamson kick); ASU – Foster 65-yard pass from Taylor Kelly (Gonzalez kick)

3rd quarter scoring: STAN – Williamson 30-yard field goal

4th quarter scoring: STAN – Montgomery 24-yard pass from Kevin Hogan (Williamson kick)

=== Vs. No. 4 Michigan State (Rose Bowl) ===
	1	2	3	4	Total
#4 Spartans	0	14	3	7	24
#5 Cardinal	10	7	0	3	20

1st quarter scoring: STAN – Tyler Gaffney 16-yard run (Jordan Williamson kick); STAN – Williamson 34-yard field goal

2nd quarter scoring: MSU – Jeremy Langford 2-yard run (Michael Geiger kick); STAN – Kevin Anderson 40-yard interception return (Williamson kick); MSU – Trevon Pendleton 2-yard pass from Connor Cook (Geiger kick)

3rd quarter scoring: MSU – Geiger 31-yard field goal

4th quarter scoring: MSU – Tony Lippett 25-yard pass from Cook (Geiger kick); STAN – Williamson 39-yard field goal

== Rankings ==
Ranking movements Legend: ██ Increase in ranking ██ Decrease in ranking
	Week																
Poll	Pre	1	2	3	4	5	6	7	8	9	10	11	12	13	14	15	Final
AP	4	5	5	5	5	5	5	13	8	6	6	5	10	8	7	5	11
Coaches	4	4	4	5	5	5	5	13	8	7	7	5	12	10	10	7	10
Harris	Not released							12	8	6	6	5	11	8	7	5	Not released
BCS	Not released								6	5	5	4	9	8	7	5	Not released

== Statistics ==
=== Scores by quarter (all opponents) ===
	1	2	3	4	Total
All Opponents	50	33	40	85	208
Stanford	96	97	102	72	367

=== Scores by quarter (Pac-12 opponents) ===
	1	2	3	4	Total
Pac-12 Opponents	41	23	33	78	175
Stanford	82	74	85	58	299

== Awards and honors ==
=== All-American Selections ===
Offense

- David Yankey, OL -- UNANIMOUS -- (AFCA, FWAA, TSN, WCFF, AP, USAT, CBS, ESPN, SI, Athlon, FOX)

Defense

- Trent Murphy, LB -- CONSENSUS -- (AFCA, FWAA, TSN, WCFF, ESPN, SI, FOX)
- Ed Reynolds, S (CBS, Athlon)

Special teams

- Ty Montgomery, RS -- CONSENSUS -- (AFCA, TSN, WCFF, CBS, SI, USAT, Athlon, FOX)

=== All-Pac-12 Conference Team Selections ===
All-Conference Honors
Player	Position	Team
David Yankey (2)	G	1st
Ben Gardner	DE	1st
Trent Murphy (2)	LB	1st
Shayne Skov	LB	1st
Ed Reynolds (2)	S	1st
Ty Montgomery	RS	1st
Tyler Gaffney	RB	2nd
Ty Montgomery	WR	2nd
Andrus Peat	OT	2nd
Cameron Fleming	OT	2nd
Khalil Wilkes	G	2nd
Joe Hemschoot	ST	2nd

*Numbers in parentheses (2) indicate multiple All-Pac-12 Team Conference selections.

== Notes ==
- January 1, 2014 – OLB Kevin Anderson's interception return for a touchdown was his first in his career, first in the Rose Bowl game since 2002.
