= The Drive (TV series) =

Sports television show

- Genre: Sports; Reality television; Documentary series
- Developed by: Pac-12 Network
- Presented by: Can-Am motorcycles
- Narrated by: Yogi Roth
- Country of origin: United States
- Original language: English
- No. of seasons: 7

Production
- Production location: Varies
- Running time: 30 minutes

Original release
- Network: Pac-12 Network
- Release: September 11, 2013 – December 4, 2019

The Drive is a television documentary franchise that aired on the Pac-12 Network. American football and men's basketball within the Pac-12 Conference were chronicled by The Drive: Pac-12 Football and The Drive: Pac-12 Basketball, respectively, in a series of weekly 30-minute episodes. The football series debuted in 2013, while its basketball counterpart began in 2015. The show appears to have ended in 2019 based on videos appearing on the Pac-12 YouTube channel, although no official announcement could be located.

== Football ==
In its inaugural season in 2013, The Drive: Pac-12 Football featured the Arizona State Sun Devils and the California Golden Bears. In its second season, The Drive followed the UCLA Bruins, while 2015 had Utah and Oregon State. Starting in 2016, The Drive started to cover all 12 teams in the conference, just like its basketball counterpart, that started in 2015.

The show is patterned after Hard Knocks, an HBO series with behind-the-scenes access to National Football League training camps. Production of The Drive is led by Pac-12 Networks’ Senior Coordinating Producer Michael Tolajian, who won two Emmy Awards as producer for NBA Entertainment and HBO’s Real Sports with Bryant Gumbel. His production team includes Jim Jorden, who helped launch Hard Knocks and has won 16 Emmys.

== Basketball ==
After two seasons of football coverage, The Drive expanded into men's basketball in 2015. Unlike the football series, The Drive: Pac-12 Basketball covers all 12 teams in the conference. Eight episodes were scheduled for 2015, with two teams featured in each of the six initial shows, followed by coverage of the Pac-12 tournament.
