= 2013 Washington State Cougars football team =

American college football season

2013 Washington State Cougars football

New Mexico Bowl, L 45–48 vs. Colorado State
- Conference: Pac-12 Conference
- North Division
- Record: 6–7 (4–5 Pac-12)
- Head coach: Mike Leach (2nd season)
- Offensive scheme: Air raid
- Defensive coordinator: Mike Breske (2nd season)
- Base defense: Multiple 3–4
- Home stadium: Martin Stadium

2013 Pac-12 Conference football standings
	Conf.			Overall
Team	W		L	W		L
North Division
No. 11 Stanford xy$	7	–	2	11	–	3
No. 9 Oregon x	7	–	2	11	–	2
No. 25 Washington	5	–	4	9	–	4
Oregon State	4	–	5	7	–	6
Washington State	4	–	5	6	–	7
California	0	–	9	1	–	11
South Division
No. 21 Arizona State xy	8	–	1	10	–	4
No. 16 UCLA	6	–	3	10	–	3
No. 19 USC	6	–	3	10	–	4
Arizona	4	–	5	8	–	5
Utah	2	–	7	5	–	7
Colorado	1	–	8	4	–	8
Championship: Stanford 38, Arizona State 14
$ – BCS representative as conference champion; x – Division champion/co-champions; y – Championship game participant; Rankings from AP Poll

The 2013 Washington State Cougars football team represented Washington State University during the 2013 NCAA Division I FBS football season. The team was coached by second-year head coach Mike Leach and played their home games at Martin Stadium in Pullman, Washington. They were members of the North Division of the Pac-12 Conference. They finished the season 6–7, 4–5 in Pac-12 play to finish in a tie for fourth place in the North Division.

Washington State became bowl eligible for the first time since the 2006 season, when they went 6–6. As the seventh-place team in the Pac-12 conference, the Cougars were selected for their first bowl game since 2003. They played the Colorado State Rams in the New Mexico Bowl on December 21, 2013, losing by the score of 48–45. The game was noted for an egregious error by head coach Mike Leach, who instead of electing to kneel down the ball three times when the Rams were out of time outs, instead ran a play which resulted in a turnover. This allowed Colorado State to tie the game and ultimately win on a last-second field goal.

== Schedule ==
Date	Time	Opponent	Site	TV	Result	Attendance
August 31	4:00 pm	at Auburn*	Jordan–Hare Stadium; Auburn, AL	ESPNU	L 24–31	85,095
September 7	7:30 pm	at No. 25 USC	Los Angeles Memorial Coliseum; Los Angeles, CA	FS1	W 10–7	77,823
September 14	3:30 pm	Southern Utah*	Martin Stadium; Pullman, WA	P12N	W 48–10	31,127
September 21	7:30 pm	Idaho*^{†}	Martin Stadium; Pullman, WA (Battle of the Palouse)	P12N	W 42–0	31,521
September 28	7:00 pm	vs. No. 5 Stanford	CenturyLink Field; Seattle, WA	ESPN	L 17–55	40,095
October 5	1:00 pm	at California	California Memorial Stadium; Berkeley, CA	FS1	W 44–22	44,682
October 12	7:30 pm	Oregon State	Martin Stadium; Pullman, WA	ESPNU	L 24–52	31,955
October 19	7:00 pm	at No. 2 Oregon	Autzen Stadium; Eugene, OR	FS1	L 38–62	56,949
October 31	7:30 pm	No. 25 Arizona State	Martin Stadium; Pullman, WA	ESPN	L 21–55	20,617
November 16	11:00 am	at Arizona	Arizona Stadium; Tucson, AZ	P12N	W 24–17	42,080
November 23	12:30 pm	Utah	Martin Stadium; Pullman, WA	P12N	W 49–37	23,112
November 29	12:30 pm	at Washington	Husky Stadium; Seattle, WA (Apple Cup)	Fox	L 17–27	71,753
December 21	11:00 am	vs. Colorado State*	University Stadium; Albuquerque, NM (New Mexico Bowl)	ESPN	L 45–48	27,104
*Non-conference game; ^{†}Homecoming; Rankings from AP Poll released prior to the game; All times are in Pacific time

== Game summaries ==
=== At Auburn ===
Washington State Cougars at Auburn Tigers – Game summary

Quarter	1	2	3	4	Total
Cougars	7	14	3	0	24
Tigers	8	17	3	3	31

at Jordan–Hare Stadium, Auburn, Alabama

- Date: August 31
- Game time: 4:00 p.m. PDT / 6:00 p.m. CDT
- Game weather: Hot and muggy, 84 °F (29 °C)
- Game attendance: 85,095
- Referee: Hubert Owens
- TV announcers (ESPNU): Clay Matvick, Matt Stinchcomb, and Dawn Davenport
- Box score, Recap

Game information
First quarter
- WSU – Jeremy Laufasa 4-yard run (Andrew Furney kick), 10:43. Cougars 7–0. Drive: 12 plays, 75 yards, 4:17.
- AUB – Tre Mason 8-yard run (Ryan White run), 2:26. Tigers 8–7. Drive: 4 plays, 28 yards, 1:17.

Second quarter

- WSU – Bobby Ratliff 7-yard pass from Connor Halliday (Andrew Furney kick), 8:02. Cougars 14–8. Drive: 9 plays, 67 yards, 4:31.
- AUB – Tre Mason 100-yard kickoff return (Cody Parkey kick), 7:46. Tigers 15–14.
- WSU – Jeremy Laufasa 1-yard run (Andrew Furney kick), 6:18. Cougars 21–15. Drive: 5 plays, 75 yards, 1:28.
- AUB – Corey Grant 75-yard run (Cody Parkey kick), 6:06. Tigers 22–21. Drive: 1 play, 75 yards, 0:12.
- AUB – Cody Parkey 47-yard field goal, 1:11. Tigers 25–21. Drive: 6 plays, 16 yards, 2:04.

Third quarter

- AUB – Cody Parkey 26-yard field goal, 6:51. Tigers 28–21. Drive: 9 plays, 44 yards, 3:59.
- WSU – Andrew Furney 43-yard field goal, 4:18. Tigers 28–24. Drive: 9 plays, 39 yards, 2:33.

Fourth quarter

- AUB – Cody Parkey 42-yard field goal, 9:07. Tigers 31–24. Drive: 12 plays, 61 yards, 5:27.

Statistics	WSU	AUB
First downs	28	16
Total yards	464	396
Rushing yards	120	297
Passing yards	99	344
Turnovers	1	3
Time of possession	31:27	28:33

Team	Category	Player	Statistics
Washington State	Passing	Connor Halliday	35/65, 344 yards, TD, 3 INT
Washington State	Rushing	Teondray Caldwell	7 rushes, 53 yards
Washington State	Receiving	Gabe Marks	9 receptions, 81 yards
Auburn	Passing	Nick Marshall	10/19, 99 yards
Auburn	Rushing	Corey Grant	9 rushes, 146 yards, TD
Auburn	Receiving	Sammie Coates	3 receptions, 44 yards

=== At No. 25 USC ===
Washington State Cougars at No. 25 USC – Game summary

Quarter	1	2	3	4	Total
Cougars	0	7	0	3	10
No. 25 Trojans	0	7	0	0	7

at Los Angeles Memorial Coliseum, Los Angeles, California

- Date: September 7
- Game time: 7:30 p.m. PDT
- Game weather: Fair, 74 °F (23 °C)
- Game attendance: 77,823
- Referee: Jack Folliard
- TV: FS1
- Box score, Recap

Game information
First quarter
- No scoring plays

Second quarter

- USC – Cody Kessler 4-yard run (Andre Heidari kick), 9:59. Trojans 7–0. Drive: 6 plays, 22 yards, 3:20.
- WSU – Damante Horton 70-yard interception return (Andrew Furney kick), 0:27. Tied 7–7.

Third quarter

- No scoring plays

Fourth quarter

- WSU – Andrew Furney 41-yard field goal, 3:03. Cougars 10–7. Drive: 7 plays, 56 yards, 3:15.

Statistics	WSU	USC
First downs	12	14
Total yards	222	215
Rushing yards	7	139
Passing yards	215	54
Turnovers	3	2
Time of possession	27:45	32:15

Team	Category	Player	Statistics
Washington State	Passing	Connor Halliday	26/38, 215 yards, 2 INT
Washington State	Rushing	Marcus Mason	11 rushes, 24 yards
Washington State	Receiving	Kristoff Williams	6 receptions, 56 yards
USC	Passing	Cody Kessler	8/13, 41 yards, INT
USC	Rushing	Tre Madden	32 rushes, 151 yards
USC	Receiving	Marqise Lee	7 receptions, 27 yards

=== Southern Utah ===
Southern Utah Thunderbirds at Washington State Cougars – Game summary

Quarter	1	2	3	4	Total
Thunderbirds	3	7	0	0	10
Cougars	14	14	13	7	48

at Martin Stadium, Pullman, Washington

- Date: September 14
- Game time: 3:30 p.m. PDT
- Game attendance: 31,127
- TV: P12N

Statistics	SUU	WSU
First downs		
Total yards		
Rushing yards		
Passing yards		
Turnovers		
Time of possession		

Team	Category	Player	Statistics
Southern Utah	Passing		
Southern Utah	Rushing		
Southern Utah	Receiving		
Washington State	Passing		
Washington State	Rushing		
Washington State	Receiving		

=== Idaho ===
Idaho Vandals at Washington State Cougars – Game summary

Quarter	1	2	3	4	Total
Vandals	0	0	0	0	0
Cougars	7	21	7	7	42

at Martin Stadium, Pullman, Washington

- Date: September 21
- Game time: 7:30 p.m. PDT
- Game attendance: 31,521
- TV: P12N

Statistics	IDHO	WSU
First downs		
Total yards		
Rushing yards		
Passing yards		
Turnovers		
Time of possession		

Team	Category	Player	Statistics
Idaho	Passing		
Idaho	Rushing		
Idaho	Receiving		
Washington State	Passing		
Washington State	Rushing		
Washington State	Receiving		

=== Vs. No. 5 Stanford ===
No. 5 Stanford Cardinal vs. Washington State Cougars – Game summary

Quarter	1	2	3	4	Total
No. 5 Cardinal	10	7	21	17	55
Cougars	3	0	0	14	17

at CenturyLink Field, Seattle, Washington

- Date: September 28
- Game time: 7:00 p.m. PDT
- Game attendance: 40,095
- TV: ESPN

Statistics	STAN	WSU
First downs		
Total yards		
Rushing yards		
Passing yards		
Turnovers		
Time of possession		

Team	Category	Player	Statistics
Stanford	Passing		
Stanford	Rushing		
Stanford	Receiving		
Washington State	Passing		
Washington State	Rushing		
Washington State	Receiving		

=== At California ===
Washington State Cougars at California Golden Bears – Game summary

Quarter	1	2	3	4	Total
Cougars	14	7	14	9	44
Golden Bears	0	15	7	0	22

at California Memorial Stadium, Berkeley, California

- Date: October 5
- Game time: 1:00 p.m. PDT
- Game attendance: 44,682
- TV: FS1

Statistics	WSU	CAL
First downs		
Total yards		
Rushing yards		
Passing yards		
Turnovers		
Time of possession		

Team	Category	Player	Statistics
Washington State	Passing		
Washington State	Rushing		
Washington State	Receiving		
California	Passing		
California	Rushing		
California	Receiving		

=== Oregon State ===
Oregon State Beavers at Washington State Cougars – Game summary

Quarter	1	2	3	4	Total
Beavers	3	14	7	28	52
Cougars	3	7	14	0	24

at Martin Stadium, Pullman, Washington

- Date: October 12
- Game time: 7:30 p.m. PDT
- Game weather: Overcast, 44 °F (7 °C)
- Game attendance: 31,955
- Referee: Jack Folliard
- TV: ESPNU
- Box score, Recap

Game information
First quarter
- WSU – Andrew Furney 27-yard field goal, 10:49. Cougars. Drive: 12 plays, 65 yards, 4:11.
- OSU – Trevor Romaine 20-yard field goal, 0:31. Tied 3–3. Drive: 13 plays, 82 yards, 5:50.

Second quarter

- WSU – Marcus Mason 3-yard run (Andrew Furney kick), 10:32. Cougars 10–3. Drive: 12 plays, 75 yards, 4:59.
- OSU – Connor Hamlett 7-yard pass from Sean Mannion (Trevor Romaine kick), 6:55. Tied 10–10. Drive: 10 plays, 75 yards, 3:37.
- OSU – Storm Woods 3-yard run (Trevor Romaine kick), 0:44. Beavers 17–10. Drive: 4 plays, 36 yards, 1:23.

Third quarter

- WSU – Jeremiah Laufasa 1-yard run (Andrew Furney kick), 11:08. Tied 17–17. Drive: 7 plays, 41 yards, 2:26.
- WSU – Vince Mayle 4-yard pass from Connor Halliday (Andrew Furney kick), 4:50. Cougars 24–17. Drive: 10 plays, 80 yards, 3:00.
- OSU – Kevin Cummings 7-yard pass from Sean Mannion (Trevor Romaine kick), 1:03. Tied 24–24. Drive: 11 plays, 82 yards, 3:41.

Fourth quarter

- OSU – Brandin Cooks 8-yard run (Trevor Romaine kick), 14:55. Beavers 31–24. Drive: 2 plays, 27 yards, 0:22.
- OSU – Storm Woods 1-yard run (Trevor Romaine kick), 13:47. Beavers 38–24. Drive: 3 plays, 45 yards, 0:52.
- OSU – Brandin Cooks 8-yard pass from Sean Mannion (Trevor Romaine kick), 10:40. Beavers 45–24. Drive: 5 plays, 39 yards, 2:21.
- OSU – Brandin Cooks 30-yard pass from Sean Mannion (Trevor Romaine kick), 6:43. Beavers 52–24. Drive: 7 plays, 70 yards, 3:47.

Statistics	ORST	WSU
First downs	29	22
Total yards	598	383
Rushing yards	102	113
Passing yards	496	270
Turnovers	2	6
Time of possession	33:58	26:02

Team	Category	Player	Statistics
Oregon State	Passing	Sean Mannion	34/51, 493 yards, 4 TD, INT
Oregon State	Rushing	Brandin Cooks	4 rushes, 34 yards, TD
Oregon State	Receiving	Brandin Cooks	11 receptions, 137 yards, 2 TD
Washington State	Passing	Connor Halliday	26/49, 248 yards, TD, 3 INT
Washington State	Rushing	Jeremiah Laufasa	9 rushes, 54 yards, TD
Washington State	Receiving	Vince Mayle	3 receptions, 55 yards, TD

=== At No. 2 Oregon ===
Washington State Cougars at No. 2 Oregon – Game summary

Quarter	1	2	3	4	Total
Cougars	7	17	0	14	38
No. 2 Ducks	20	14	14	14	62

at Autzen Stadium, Eugene, Oregon

- Date: October 12
- Game time: 7:30 p.m. PDT
- Game attendance: 56,949
- TV: FS1

Statistics	WSU	ORE
First downs		
Total yards		
Rushing yards		
Passing yards		
Turnovers		
Time of possession		

Team	Category	Player	Statistics
Washington State	Passing		
Washington State	Rushing		
Washington State	Receiving		
Oregon	Passing		
Oregon	Rushing		
Oregon	Receiving		

=== No. 25 Arizona State ===
No. 25 Arizona State Sun Devils at Washington State Cougars – Game summary

Quarter	1	2	3	4	Total
No. 25 Sun Devils	21	21	7	6	55
Cougars	0	14	7	0	21

at Martin Stadium, Pullman, Washington

- Date: October 31
- Game time: 7:30 p.m. PDT
- Game attendance: 20,617
- TV: ESPN

Statistics	ASU	WSU
First downs		
Total yards		
Rushing yards		
Passing yards		
Turnovers		
Time of possession		

Team	Category	Player	Statistics
Arizona State	Passing		
Arizona State	Rushing		
Arizona State	Receiving		
Washington State	Passing		
Washington State	Rushing		
Washington State	Receiving		

=== At Arizona ===
Washington State Cougars at Arizona Wildcats – Game summary

Quarter	1	2	3	4	Total
Cougars	10	0	7	7	24
Wildcats	7	7	3	0	17

at Arizona Stadium, Tucson, Arizona

- Date: November 16
- Game time: 11:00 a.m. PST / 12:00 p.m. MST
- Game attendance: 42,080
- TV: P12N

Statistics	WSU	ARIZ
First downs		
Total yards		
Rushing yards		
Passing yards		
Turnovers		
Time of possession		

Team	Category	Player	Statistics
Washington State	Passing		
Washington State	Rushing		
Washington State	Receiving		
Arizona	Passing		
Arizona	Rushing		
Arizona	Receiving		

=== Utah ===
Utah Utes at Washington State Cougars – Game summary

Quarter	1	2	3	4	Total
Utes	7	13	10	7	37
Cougars	21	12	10	6	49

at Martin Stadium, Pullman, Washington

- Date: November 23
- Game time: 12:30 p.m. PST
- Game attendance: 23,112
- TV: P12N

Statistics	UTAH	WSU
First downs		
Total yards		
Rushing yards		
Passing yards		
Turnovers		
Time of possession		

Team	Category	Player	Statistics
Utah	Passing		
Utah	Rushing		
Utah	Receiving		
Washington State	Passing		
Washington State	Rushing		
Washington State	Receiving		

=== At Washington ===
Washington State Cougars at Washington Huskies – Game summary

Quarter	1	2	3	4	Total
Cougars	0	10	0	7	17
Huskies	3	0	17	7	27

at Husky Stadium, Seattle, Washington

- Date: November 29
- Game time: 12:30 p.m. PST
- Game attendance: 71,753
- TV: Fox

Statistics	WSU	WASH
First downs		
Total yards		
Rushing yards		
Passing yards		
Turnovers		
Time of possession		

Team	Category	Player	Statistics
Washington State	Passing		
Washington State	Rushing		
Washington State	Receiving		
Washington	Passing		
Washington	Rushing		
Washington	Receiving		

=== Vs. Colorado State (New Mexico Bowl) ===
2013 New Mexico Bowl
Washington State Cougars vs. Colorado State Rams – Game summary

Quarter	1	2	3	4	Total
Cougars	21	14	3	7	45
Rams	10	13	7	18	48

at University Stadium, Albuquerque, New Mexico

- Date: December 21
- Game time: 11:00 a.m. PST / 12:00 p.m. MST
- Game attendance: 27,104
- Referee: Ken Williamson
- TV announcers (ESPN): Mark Jones, Brock Huard, and Jessica Mendoza

Statistics	WSU	CSU
First downs		
Total yards		
Rushing yards		
Passing yards		
Turnovers		
Time of possession		

Team	Category	Player	Statistics
Washington State	Passing		
Washington State	Rushing		
Washington State	Receiving		
Colorado State	Passing		
Colorado State	Rushing		
Colorado State	Receiving		

== Personnel ==
2013 Washington State Cougars football team roster
Players
Coaches
Offense

Pos.	#	Name	Class
QB		Connor Halliday
		Jeremiah Laufasa
WR		Gabe Marks
		Marcus Mason
WR		Vince Mayle

Defense

Pos.	#	Name	Class

Special teams

Pos.	#	Name	Class
K		Andrew Furney

Head coach

- Mike Leach

Coordinators/assistant coaches

- Mike Breske – Defensive coordinator/defensive backs
- Dave Emerick – Senior associate AD / chief of staff for football
- Antonio Huffman – Director of football operations
- Jim Mastro – Running backs
- Clay McGuire – Offensive line
- Joe Salave'a – Defensive line
- Dennis Simmons – Outside receivers
- Paul Volero – Outside linebackers
- Ken Wilson – Linebackers
- David Yost – Inside receivers

Legend

- (C) Team captain
- (S) Suspended
- (I) Ineligible
- Injured
- Redshirt

Roster
Last update: January 29, 2013
