= D. J. Foster =

American gridiron football player (born 1993)

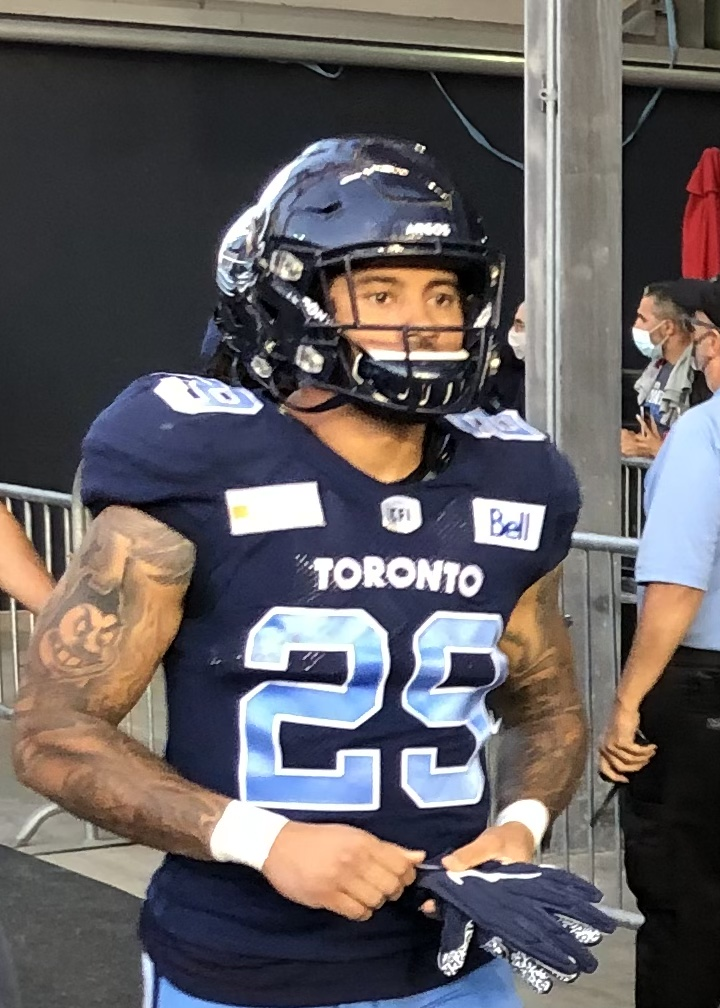
- Foster with the Toronto Argonauts in 2021.

Arizona State Sun Devils
- Title: Manager of player development

Personal information
- Born: November 22, 1993 (age 32); San Jose, California, U.S.
- Listed height: 6 ft 0 in (1.83 m)
- Listed weight: 205 lb (93 kg)

Career information
- High school: Saguaro (Scottsdale, Arizona)
- College: Arizona State
- NFL draft: 2016: undrafted

Career history

Playing
- New England Patriots (2016–2017); Arizona Cardinals (2017–2020); Toronto Argonauts (2021)

Operations
- Arizona State (2023–present) Manager of player development

Awards and highlights
- Super Bowl champion (LI); Second-team All-Pac-12 (2014)

Career NFL statistics
- Rushing attempts: 15
- Rushing yards: 45
- Receptions: 19
- Receiving yards: 142
- Stats at Pro Football Reference
- Stats at CFL.ca

Darryll James Foster (born November 22, 1993) is an American former football running back who is the manager of player development at Arizona State University, where he played college football. He signed with the New England Patriots as an undrafted free agent in 2016. He was a member of the Super Bowl LI winning Patriots, though was inactive for the game itself.

== Early life ==
Foster attended Saguaro High School in Scottsdale, Arizona, where he rushed for more than 5,000 yards in his career. As a senior, he set an Arizona state single-season record with 60 total touchdowns, and also set state marks for rushing yards in a game (508), touchdowns in a game (10), touchdowns in a career, points in a career and points in a season. He helped lead his team to the Arizona Division III State Championship to cap off his high school career. He was chosen by the Arizona Republic as the Big Schools Player of the Year in 2011, and also was named the 2011 Tribune Football Player of the Year by the East Valley Tribune.

Considered a four-star recruit by Rivals.com, he was rated as the 5th best athlete prospect of his class, and drew comparisons to Greg Jennings. On January 27, 2012, he announced his commitment to Arizona State over numerous Power 5 offers.

== College career ==
=== 2012 season ===
Foster played in all 13 games, making one start. He scored his first career touchdown against Missouri. He finished second on the team in all-purpose yardage with 1,026 yards (493 rushing and 533 receiving), and recorded six total touchdowns (two rushing, four receiving).

=== 2013 season ===
Foster entered the season ready for an increased role with the team. He led the nation in receiving yards by a running back and was second overall on the team (653). He finished second on the team in all-purpose yardage (1,170 yards) and ranked second on the team in receptions (63). He totaled 10 total touchdowns for the season (six rushing, four receiving). He had ASU’s only touchdowns (one rush, one receiving) against Stanford in the Pac-12 Championship.

=== 2014 season ===
Following the departure of Marion Grice, Foster took over as the main back and offensive weapon for the Sun Devils. On the season, he had 194 carries for 1,081 rushing yards and nine rushing touchdowns to go along with 62 receptions for 688 receiving yards and six receiving touchdowns.

=== 2015 season ===
On December 30, 2014, Foster announced he would return to Arizona State for his senior season as a wide receiver. Overall, on the 2015 season, he had 59 receptions for 584 receiving yards and three receiving touchdowns to go along with 55 carries for 280 rushing yards and a rushing touchdown.

=== Statistics ===
Season	Team	Rushing					Receiving			
Season	Team	Att	Yds	Avg	Lng	TD	Rec	Yds	Avg	TD
2012	Arizona State	102	493	4.8	24	2	38	533	14.0	4
2013	Arizona State	93	501	5.4	51	8	63	653	10.4	4
2014	Arizona State	194	1,081	5.6	54	9	62	688	11.1	3
2015	Arizona State	55	280	5.1	63	1	59	584	9.9	3
Career		444	2,355	5.3	57	17	222	2,458	11.1	11

== Professional career ==
Coming out of Arizona State, Foster was projected by many analysts to be either a fifth round selection or priority free-agent. He was ranked the 23rd best running back out of the 204 available by NFLDraftScout.com.

Pre-draft measurables
Height	Weight	Arm length	Hand span	40-yard dash	10-yard split	20-yard split	20-yard shuttle	Three-cone drill	Vertical jump	Broad jump	Bench press
5 ft 10 1/4 in (1.78 m)	193 lb (88 kg)	30 1/2 in (0.77 m)	9 1/4 in (0.23 m)	4.57 s	1.58 s	2.65 s	4.07 s	6.75 s	35 1/2 in (0.90 m)	9 ft 9 in (2.97 m)	14 reps
All values from NFL Combine

Foster went undrafted in the 2016 NFL draft, and was signed by the Patriots as a rookie free agent.

=== New England Patriots ===
On September 3, 2016, Foster was announced to have made the Patriots final 53-man roster and he made his professional debut on September 18, 2016, in the Patriots 31–24 win over the Miami Dolphins in Week 2. He was released by the Patriots on November 28, 2016, and was re-signed to the practice squad. He was promoted back to the active roster on December 3, 2016. On February 5, 2017, Foster's Patriots appeared in Super Bowl LI. He was inactive for the game. In the game, the Patriots trailed 28–3 in the third quarter, but rallied all the way back to win the game by a score of 34–28 against the Atlanta Falcons, in a game that featured the first overtime Super Bowl and largest comeback in Super Bowl history.

Foster was released by the Patriots on September 2, 2017, and signed to the practice squad the next day.

=== Arizona Cardinals ===
On September 12, 2017, Foster was signed by the Arizona Cardinals off the Patriots' practice squad. In the 2017 season, he appeared in seven games and had 17 receptions for 133 receiving yards.

On August 27, 2018, Foster suffered a torn MCL and ACL in the Cardinals' third preseason game and was ruled out for the season.

On October 28, 2019, Foster was placed on injured reserve with a hamstring injury.

On March 27, 2020, Foster re-signed with the Cardinals. Foster was released during final roster cuts on September 5, 2020, and re-signed to the practice squad a day later. He was elevated to the active roster on September 12 and 19 for the team's weeks 1 and 2 games against the San Francisco 49ers and Washington Football Team, and reverted to the practice squad after each game. Foster suffered a quadriceps injury in the Washington game, and he was placed on the practice squad/injured list on September 21. He was activated back to the practice squad on October 20. He was elevated to the active roster again on November 7, November 14, November 19, November 28, and December 5 for the team's weeks 9, 10, 11, 12, and 13 games against the Miami Dolphins, Buffalo Bills, Seattle Seahawks, New England Patriots, and Los Angeles Rams, and reverted to the practice squad after each game. Foster was promoted to the active roster on December 19.

=== Toronto Argonauts ===
On July 19, 2021, Foster signed with the Toronto Argonauts of the Canadian Football League. He played in 10 regular season games where he had 82 carries for 332 yards and two rushing touchdowns and also had 33 receptions for 316 yards and two receiving touchdowns. He also played in the East Final where he had 11 carries for 38 yards and three catches for 57 yards in the loss to the Hamilton Tiger-Cats. He was released by the Argonauts on May 6, 2022, after the signing of Andrew Harris.
