= 2013 USC Trojans football team =

American college football season

2013 USC Trojans football

Las Vegas Bowl champion

Las Vegas Bowl, W 45–20 vs. Fresno State
- Conference: Pac-12 Conference
- South Division

Ranking
- Coaches: No. 19
- AP: No. 19
- Record: 10–4 (6–3 Pac-12)
- Head coach: Lane Kiffin (4th season; first 5 games); Ed Orgeron (interim; remaining regular season games); Clay Helton (interim; bowl game)
- Offensive coordinator: Clay Helton (1st season)
- Offensive scheme: West Coast
- Defensive coordinator: Clancy Pendergast (1st season)
- Base defense: 5–2
- Captains: Devon Kennard; Marqise Lee; Marcus Martin; Hayes Pullard
- Home stadium: Los Angeles Memorial Coliseum

2013 Pac-12 Conference football standings
	Conf.			Overall
Team	W		L	W		L
North Division
No. 11 Stanford xy$	7	–	2	11	–	3
No. 9 Oregon x	7	–	2	11	–	2
No. 25 Washington	5	–	4	9	–	4
Oregon State	4	–	5	7	–	6
Washington State	4	–	5	6	–	7
California	0	–	9	1	–	11
South Division
No. 21 Arizona State xy	8	–	1	10	–	4
No. 16 UCLA	6	–	3	10	–	3
No. 19 USC	6	–	3	10	–	4
Arizona	4	–	5	8	–	5
Utah	2	–	7	5	–	7
Colorado	1	–	8	4	–	8
Championship: Stanford 38, Arizona State 14
$ – BCS representative as conference champion; x – Division champion/co-champions; y – Championship game participant; Rankings from AP Poll

The 2013 USC Trojans football team represented the University of Southern California in the 2013 NCAA Division I FBS college football season. They played their home games at Los Angeles Memorial Coliseum, and were members of the South Division of the Pac-12 Conference. They finished the season 10–4, 6–3 in Pac-12 play to finish in a tie for second place in the South Division. They were invited to the Las Vegas Bowl where they defeated Fresno State.

Head coach Lane Kiffin, who was in his fourth year, was fired on September 29 after a 3–2 start to the season. He was replaced by interim head coach Ed Orgeron. At the end of the regular season, Washington head coach Steve Sarkisian was hired as the new head coach beginning in 2014. This prompted Orgeron to resign before the bowl game; Clay Helton led the Trojans in the Las Vegas Bowl.

== Personnel ==
=== Coaching staff ===
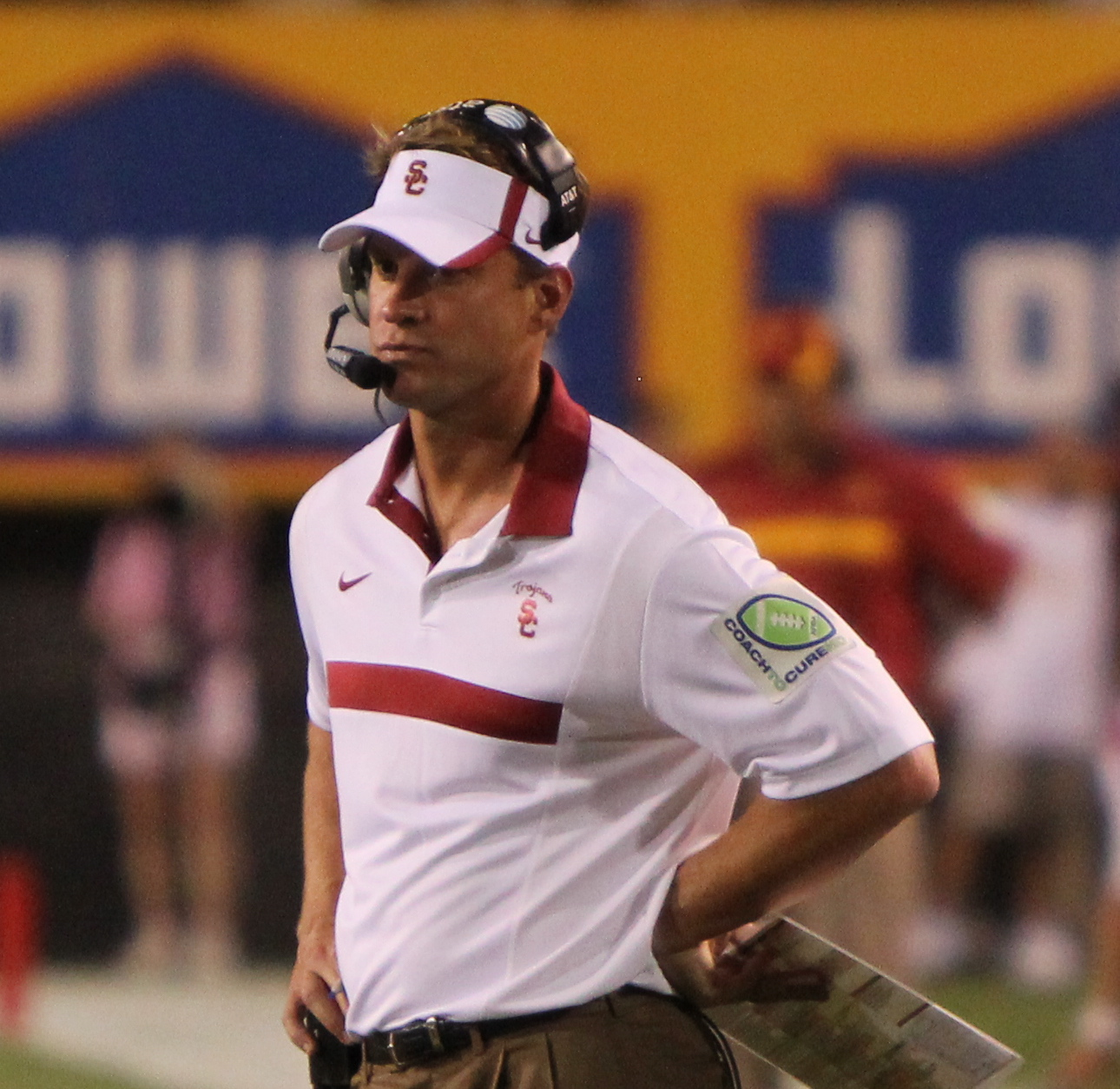
Head coach Lane Kiffin was fired on September 29, 2013, after losing the Arizona State game

Name	Position	Seasons at USC	Alma mater
Clay Helton	Interim head coach, recruiting coordinator, offensive coordinator, quarterbacks coach	3	Houston (1994)
John Baxter	Associate head coach, special teams coordinator	4	Loras (1985)
Clancy Pendergast	Defensive coordinator, secondary coach	1	Arizona (1990)
Mike Summers	Offensive line coach, running game coordinator	1	Kentucky (1980)
Ed Orgeron	Defensive line coach, interim head coach		
Mike Ekeler	Linebackers coach	1	Kansas State (1994)
James Cregg	Assistant offensive line coach	4	Colorado State (1995)
Tee Martin	Wide receivers coach	2	Tennessee (2000)
Tommie Robinson	Pass game coordinator / running backs coach	1	Troy (1986)
Jaron Fairman	Special teams graduate assistant	1	Fresno State (2007)
Aaron Ausmus	Strength and conditioning	4	Tennessee (1998)

Lane Kiffin started the season as the Trojans' head coach, but was fired on September 29 after a 3–2 start. Ed Orgeron became the interim head coach, and went 6–2. He resigned on December 3 after it was announced that Steve Sarkisian was hired to be the permanent head coach.

=== Depth chart ===
Defense

FS
Demetrius Wright
Leon McQuay III

WLB	SLB
Lamar Dawson	Hayes Pullard
Anthony Sarao	Michael Hutchings

SS
Dion Bailey
Su’a Cravens

CB
Josh Shaw
Anthony Brown

Predator	DT	NT	DT	DE
Morgan Breslin	Leonard Williams	Antwaun Woods	George Uko	Devon Kennard
Kevin Greene	J.R. Tavai	Cody Temple	Michael Maguire	Jabari Ruffin

CB
Kevon Seymour
Torin Harris

Offense

WR
Darreus Rogers
Victor Blackwell

LT	LG	C	RG	RT
Chad Wheeler	Aundrey Walker	Marcus Martin	Max Tuerk	Kevin Graf
Aundrey Walker	John Martinez	Cyrus Hobbi	Jordan Simmons	⋅

TE
Xavier Grimble
Randall Telfer

WR
Nelson Agholor
De’Von Flournoy

QB
Cody Kessler
Max Browne

RB
Silas Redd
Javorius Allen

FB
Soma Vainuku
Jahleel Pinner

Special teams
PK Andre Heidari
P Kris Albarado
KR Marqise Lee, Nelson Agholor
PR Marqise Lee, Nelson Agholor
LS Peter McBride
H Cody Kessler

=== Recruiting class ===
College recruiting (2013)
Name	Hometown	School	Height	Weight	Commit date
Su'a Cravens; S	Murrieta, CA	Vista Murrieta High School	6 ft 1 in (1.85 m)	205 lb (93 kg)	?
Su'a Cravens; S	Recruit ratings: Rivals:				
Leon McQuay III; S	Seffner, FL	Armwood High School	6 ft 2 in (1.88 m)	183 lb (83 kg)	?
Leon McQuay III; S	Recruit ratings: Rivals:				
Max Browne; QB	Sammamish, WA	Skyline High School	6 ft 5 in (1.96 m)	214 lb (97 kg)	?
Max Browne; QB	Recruit ratings: Rivals:				
Kenny Bigelow; DT	Elkton, MD	Eastern Christian Academy	6 ft 3 in (1.91 m)	297 lb (135 kg)	?
Kenny Bigelow; DT	Recruit ratings: Rivals:				
Michael Hutchings; LB	Concord, CA	De La Salle High School	6 ft 1 in (1.85 m)	213 lb (97 kg)	?
Michael Hutchings; LB	Recruit ratings: Rivals:				
Quinton Powell; LB	Daytona Beach, FL	Mainland High School	6 ft 2 in (1.88 m)	200 lb (91 kg)	?
Quinton Powell; LB	Recruit ratings: Rivals:				
Chris Hawkins; CB	Rancho Cucamonga, CA	Rancho Cucamonga High School	5 ft 11 in (1.80 m)	159 lb (72 kg)	?
Chris Hawkins; CB	Recruit ratings: Rivals:				
Steven Mitchell; WR	Mission Hills, CA	Bishop Alemany High School	5 ft 11 in (1.80 m)	176 lb (80 kg)	?
Steven Mitchell; WR	Recruit ratings: Rivals:				
Darreus Rogers; WR	Carson, CA	Carson High School	6 ft 2 in (1.88 m)	195 lb (88 kg)	?
Darreus Rogers; WR	Recruit ratings: Rivals:				
Nico Falah; OT	Bellflower, CA	Saint John Bosco High School	6 ft 4 in (1.93 m)	267 lb (121 kg)	?
Nico Falah; OT	Recruit ratings: Rivals:				
Khaliel Rodgers; G	Elkton, MD	Eastern Christian Academy	6 ft 2 in (1.88 m)	323 lb (147 kg)	?
Khaliel Rodgers; G	Recruit ratings: Rivals:				
Justin Davis; TB	Stockton, CA	Lincoln High School	6 ft 1 in (1.85 m)	199 lb (90 kg)	?
Justin Davis; TB	Recruit ratings: Rivals:				
Ty Isaac; TB	Joliet, IL	Joliet Catholic Academy	6 ft 3 in (1.91 m)	217 lb (98 kg)	?
Ty Isaac; TB	Recruit ratings: Rivals:				
Overall recruit ranking: Rivals: 14 (No. 14 in average star ranking at 4.0)
Note: In many cases, Scout, Rivals, 247Sports, On3, and ESPN may conflict in their listings of height and weight.; In these cases, the average was taken. ESPN grades are on a 100-point scale.; Sources: "2013 Team Ranking". Rivals.com.

== Schedule ==
Date	Time	Opponent	Rank	Site	TV	Result	Attendance
August 29	8:00 p.m.	at Hawaii*	No. 24	Aloha Stadium; Honolulu, HI	CBSSN	W 30–13	39,058
September 7	7:30 p.m.	Washington State	No. 25	Los Angeles Memorial Coliseum; Los Angeles, CA	FS1	L 7–10	77,823
September 14	12:00 p.m.	Boston College*		Los Angeles Memorial Coliseum; Los Angeles, CA	P12N	W 35–7	62,006
September 21	12:30 p.m.	Utah State*		Los Angeles Memorial Coliseum; Los Angeles, CA	ABC/ESPN2	W 17–14	63,482
September 28	7:30 p.m.	at Arizona State		Sun Devil Stadium; Tempe, AZ	ESPN2	L 41–62	64,987
October 10	7:30 p.m.	Arizona		Los Angeles Memorial Coliseum; Los Angeles, CA	FS1	W 38–31	64,215
October 19	4:30 p.m.	at Notre Dame*		Notre Dame Stadium; Notre Dame, IN (Jeweled Shillelagh)	NBC	L 10–14	80,795
October 26	1:00 p.m.	Utah		Los Angeles Memorial Coliseum; Los Angeles, CA	P12N	W 19–3	64,715
November 1	6:00 p.m.	at Oregon State		Reser Stadium; Corvallis, OR	ESPN2	W 31–14	45,379
November 9	12:00 p.m.	at California		Memorial Stadium; Berkeley, CA	FOX	W 62–28	49,199
November 16	5:00 p.m.	No. 5 Stanford^{†}		Los Angeles Memorial Coliseum; Los Angeles, CA (rivalry) (College GameDay)	ABC	W 20–17	93,607
November 23	6:30 p.m.	at Colorado	No. 23	Folsom Field; Boulder, CO	P12N	W 47–29	36,005
November 30	5:00 p.m.	No. 22 UCLA	No. 23	Los Angeles Memorial Coliseum; Los Angeles, CA (Victory Bell)	ABC	L 14–35	86,037
December 21	12:30 p.m.	vs. No. 20 Fresno State*		Sam Boyd Stadium; Whitney, NV (Las Vegas Bowl)	ABC	W 45–20	42,178
*Non-conference game; ^{†}Homecoming; Rankings from AP Poll released prior to game; All times are in Pacific time

== Game summaries ==
=== Hawaii ===
USC at Hawaii

Team	1	2	3	4	Total
• #24 Trojans	3	17	0	10	30
Rainbow Warriors	0	5	0	8	13

- Date: August 31
- Location: Aloha Stadium
  Honolulu, HI
- Game start: 8:05 p.m. PST
- Elapsed time: 3:43
- Game attendance: 39,058
- Game weather: 87 °F (31 °C), Partly Cloudy, winds NNE at 5-10mph
- Referee: Greg Burks
- TV announcers (CBSSN, Sports USA Radio): Andrew Catalon, Aaron Taylor, and Lauren Gardner (CBSSN); John Ahlers, John Robinson, and Jim Oshiro (Sports USA)

=== Washington State ===
	1	2	3	4	Total
Cougars	0	7	0	3	10
#25 Trojans	0	7	0	0	7

1st quarter scoring: None

2nd quarter scoring: USC – Cody Kessler 4-yard run (Andre Heidari kick); WSU – Damante Horton 70-yard interception return (Andrew Furney kick)

3rd quarter scoring: None

4th quarter scoring: WSU – Furney 41-yard field goal

=== Boston College ===
	1	2	3	4	Total
Eagles	0	0	0	7	7
Trojans	7	7	7	14	35

=== Utah State ===
	1	2	3	4	Total
Aggies	0	7	7	0	14
Trojans	7	7	0	3	17

=== Arizona State ===
	1	2	3	4	Total
Trojans	7	7	7	20	41
Sun Devils	7	13	28	14	62

Head Coach Lane Kiffin was fired after this game upon returning to Los Angeles with the team on September 29, 2013

=== Arizona ===
	1	2	3	4	Total
Wildcats	0	10	7	14	31
Trojans	14	14	3	7	38

Interim head coach Ed Orgeron takes over the program for USC.

=== Notre Dame ===
	1	2	3	4	Total
Trojans	7	3	0	0	10
Fighting Irish	7	7	0	0	14

1st quarter scoring: USC – Silas Redd 1-yard run (Andre Heidari kick); ND – Troy Niklas 7-yard pass from Tommy Rees (Kyle Brindza kick)

2nd quarter scoring: USC – Heidari 22-yard field goal; ND – TJ Jones 11-yard pass from Rees (Brindza kick)

=== Utah ===
	1	2	3	4	Total
Utes	3	0	0	0	3
Trojans	7	9	3	0	19

1st quarter scoring: UTAH – Andy Phillips 42-yard field goal; USC – Nelson Agholor 30-yard pass from Cody Kessler (Andre Heidari kick)

2nd quarter scoring: USC – Heidari 35-yard field goal; USC – Heidari 38-yard field goal; USC – Heidari 28-yard field goal

3rd quarter scoring: USC – Heidari 40-yard field goal

4th quarter scoring: None

=== Oregon State ===
	1	2	3	4	Total
Trojans	14	7	10	0	31
Beavers	0	14	0	0	14

=== California ===
	1	2	3	4	Total
Trojans	21	20	14	7	62
Golden Bears	0	14	7	7	28

1st quarter scoring: USC – Nelson Agholor 75-yard punt return (Andre Heidari kick); USC – Silas Redd 12-yard pass from Cody Kessler (Heidari kick); USC – Javorius Allen 43-yard run (Heidari kick)

2nd quarter scoring: CAL – Kenny Lawler 4-yard pass from Jared Goff (Vincen D'Amato kick); CAL – Darius Powe 24-yard pass from Goff (D'Amato kick); USC – Allen 57-yard pass from Kessler (Heidari kick); USC – Josh Shaw 14-yard punt return (Heidari kick); USC – Agholor 93-yard punt return (kick missed)

3rd quarter scoring: USC – Allen 79-yard run (Heidari kick); USC – Ty Isaac 4-yard run (Heidari kick); CAL – Khalfani Muhammad 7-yard run (D'Amato kick)

4th quarter scoring: USC – Isaac 37-yard run (Heidari kick); CAL – Lawler 4-yard pass from Goff (D'Amato kick)

=== Stanford ===
	1	2	3	4	Total
#5 Cardinal	7	3	7	0	17
Trojans	14	3	0	3	20

1st quarter scoring: USC – Soma Vainuku 1-yard pass from Cody Kessler (Andre Heidari kick failed); STAN – T. Gaffney 35-yard run (C. Ukropina kick); USC – Javorius Allen 1-yard run (Marqise Lee pass from Kessler)

2nd quarter scoring: USC – Heidari 23-yard field goal; STAN – Ukropina 27-yard field goal

3rd quarter scoring: STAN – Gaffney 18-yard run (Ukropina kick)

4th quarter scoring: USC – Heidari 47-yard field goal

=== Colorado ===
	1	2	3	4	Total
#23 Trojans	9	14	14	10	47
Buffaloes	0	0	7	22	29

=== UCLA ===
	1	2	3	4	Total
#22 Bruins	7	7	14	7	35
#23 Trojans	0	7	7	0	14

Last season, the Bruins defeated the Trojans 38–28 in the Rose Bowl.

1st quarter scoring: UCLA – Myles Jack 3-yard run (Kaʻimi Fairbairn kick)

2nd quarter scoring: UCLA – Eddie Vanderdoes 1-yard run (Fairbairn kick); USC – Javorius Allen 11-yard run (Andre Heidari kick)

3rd quarter scoring: UCLA – Brett Hundley 12-yard run (Fairbairn kick); USC – Xavier Grimble 22-yard pass from Cody Kessler (Heidari kick); UCLA – Hundley 5-yard run (Fairbairn kick)

4th quarter scoring: UCLA – Paul Perkins 8-yard run (Fairbairn kick)

=== Fresno State (Las Vegas Bowl) ===
	1	2	3	4	Total
Trojans	14	21	3	7	45
#20 Bulldogs	6	0	7	7	20

Tracy Jones of the American Athletic Conference is the referee.

1st quarter scoring: USC – Marqise Lee 10-yard pass from Cody Kessler (Andre Heidari kick); FS – Isaiah Burse 8-yard pass from Derek Carr (Colin McGuire kick blocked); USC – Nelson Agholor 40-yard pass from Kessler (Heidari kick)

2nd quarter scoring: USC – Agholor 17-yard pass from Kessler (Heidari kick); USC – Javorius Allen 24-yard run (Heidari kick); USC – Lee 40-yard pass from Kessler (Heidari kick)

3rd quarter scoring: FS – Davante Adams 23-yard pass from Carr (McGuire kick); USC – Heidari 39-yard field goal

4th quarter scoring: FS – Derron Smith 41-yard interception return (McGuire kick); USC – Allen 1-yard run (Heidari kick)

== Rankings ==
Ranking movements Legend: ██ Increase in ranking ██ Decrease in ranking — = Not ranked RV = Received votes
	Week																
Poll	Pre	1	2	3	4	5	6	7	8	9	10	11	12	13	14	15	Final
AP	24	25	—	—	—	—	—	—	—	—	—	RV	23	23	RV	RV	19
Coaches	24	22	RV	RV	—	—	—	—	—	—	RV	RV	25	23	RV	RV	19
Harris	Not released							—	—	—	RV	RV	23	23	RV	RV	Not released
BCS	Not released								—	—	—	—	23	23	—	25	Not released

== Statistics ==
=== Scores by quarter (Pac-12 opponents) ===
	1	2	3	4	Total
USC	21	14	10	20	65
Pac-12 Opponents	3	14	28	14	59

== Notes ==
- December 21, 2013 – After winning the Las Vegas Bowl game, USC announced that Clay Helton will return next season.
