= Ty Montgomery =

American football player (born 1993)

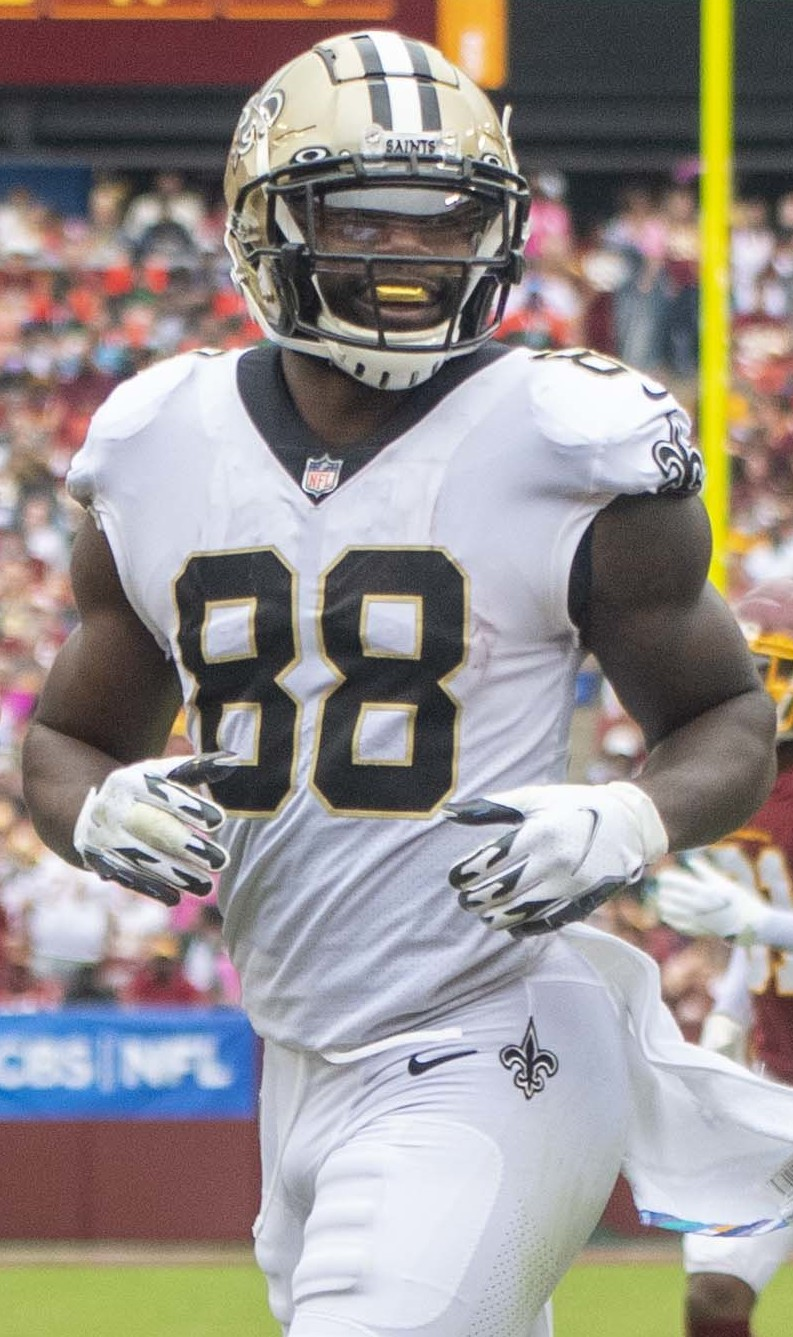
- Montgomery with the New Orleans Saints in 2021

No. 88, 14
- Position: Running back

Personal information
- Born: January 22, 1993 (age 33); Jackson, Mississippi, U.S.
- Listed height: 6 ft 0 in (1.83 m)
- Listed weight: 220 lb (100 kg)

Career information
- High school: St. Mark's School of Texas (Dallas, Texas)
- College: Stanford (2011–2014)
- NFL draft: 2015: 3rd round, 94th overall pick

Career history
- Green Bay Packers (2015–2018); Baltimore Ravens (2018); New York Jets (2019); New Orleans Saints (2020–2021); New England Patriots (2022–2023)

Awards and highlights
- Jet Award (2013); Consensus All-American (2013); First-team All-Pac-12 (2013); Second-team All-Pac-12 (2014)

Career NFL statistics
- Receptions: 147
- Receiving yards: 1,159
- Rushing yards: 1,187
- Rushing average: 4.5
- Return yards: 1,521
- Total touchdowns: 11
- Stats at Pro Football Reference

Ty Anthony Montgomery II (born January 22, 1993) is an American former professional football player who was a running back in the National Football League (NFL). He played college football for the Stanford Cardinal, earning consensus All-American honors in 2013. Montgomery was selected as a wide receiver by the Green Bay Packers in the third round of the 2015 NFL draft. In 2016, he changed positions to running back.

== Early life ==
Montgomery attended St. Mark's School of Texas in Dallas, Texas, where he was a five-sport star in football, track, basketball, baseball, and lacrosse. Montgomery played as a wide receiver, running back, and quarterback for the Lions football team. As a senior, he had 823 rushing yards on 93 carries and 17 catches with 10 total touchdowns. Montgomery had 118 catches and 36 total touchdowns during his high school career.

As a standout track & field athlete, Montgomery competed as a sprinter and long jumper. At the 2011 SPC Championships, he earned first-place finishes in both the 100-meter dash (10.81 s) and 200-meter dash (22.20 s), while also anchoring the 4x100 squad to victory (43.15 s). Montgomery posted a career-best leap of 6.55 meters (21 ft, 3 in) in the long jump at the 2011 Lancaster Meet of Champions.

== College career ==
Montgomery played wide receiver at Stanford University from 2011 to 2014 under head coach David Shaw. Montgomery wore uniform number 88 during his first two seasons at Stanford. When he returned for his junior season with renewed vigor, Montgomery says that he switched from No. 88 to No. 7 to represent his fresh start and his faith, citing the seventh day in Christianity. Prior to the start of Montgomery's junior season, Stanford announced they would retire uniform number 7 in honor of legendary Stanford quarterback John Elway and stated that "wide receiver Ty Montgomery and defensive end Aziz Shittu will be the last to wear that jersey at Stanford."

As a freshman in 2011, Montgomery contributed on offense and special teams. On October 15 against Washington State, he had three kick returns for 147 net yards and a touchdown. On November 19 against California, Montgomery had a 34-yard rushing touchdown on his lone carry of the game. In the Fiesta Bowl against Oklahoma State, he had seven receptions for 120 yards and a touchdown. Montgomery had 24 receptions for 350 yards and two touchdowns to go along with two carries for 42 yards and a touchdown.

As a sophomore in 2012, Montgomery continued his role on offense and special teams. Overall, he finished the season with 26 receptions for 213 yards and had 11 kick returns for 293 net yards for a 26.6 average.

As a junior in 2013, Montgomery was a consensus All-American as a return specialist. On October 5 against Washington, he had four kick returns for 204 net yards and a touchdown. In the next game against Utah, Montgomery had eight receptions for 131 receiving yards to go along with three kick returns for 160 net yards and a touchdown. On November 23 against California, he had 160 receiving yards, four receiving touchdowns, and 31 rushing yards with a rushing touchdown. Montgomery led the nation with a 31.2-yard kickoff return average and scored two touchdowns. He also had 61 receptions for 958 receiving yards and 10 touchdowns to go along with 159 rushing yards and two rushing touchdowns.

As a senior in 2014, Montgomery still produced for the Cardinal, but he did suffer through some regression. In the season opener against UC Davis, he had 77 receiving yards, one receiving touchdown, and a punt return touchdown. Overall, Montgomery finished his senior season with 61 receptions for 604 receiving yards and three touchdowns to go along with 144 rushing yards and a rushing touchdown.

Montgomery finished his collegiate career with 172 receptions for 2,125 yards and 15 touchdown receptions.

== Professional career ==
External videos
- Montgomery's NFL Combine workout
- Montgomery gets drafted by Green Bay

Pre-draft measurables
Height	Weight	Arm length	Hand span	40-yard dash	10-yard split	20-yard split	20-yard shuttle	Three-cone drill	Vertical jump	Broad jump	Bench press	Wonderlic
5 ft 11 7/8 in (1.83 m)	221 lb (100 kg)	31 in (0.79 m)	10 1/8 in (0.26 m)	4.55 s	1.59 s	2.64 s	4.21 s	6.97 s	40 1/2 in (1.03 m)	10 ft 1 in (3.07 m)	16 reps	24
All values are from NFL Combine, except bench press from Pro Day

=== Green Bay Packers ===
==== 2015 ====
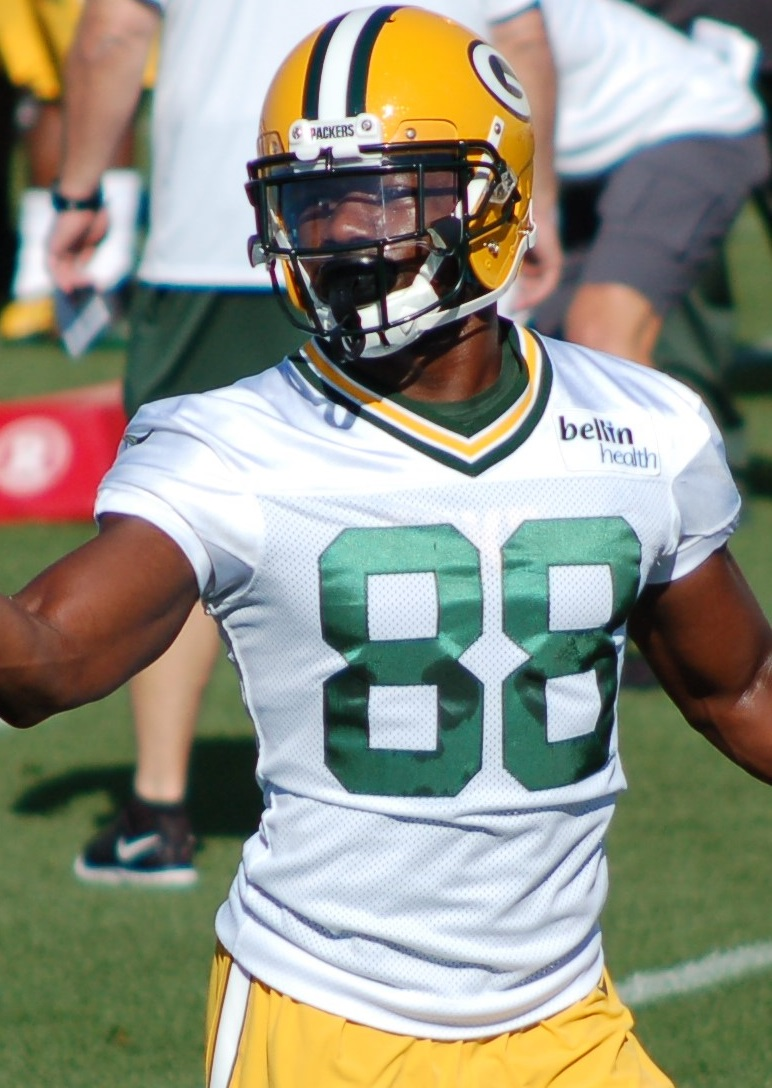
Montgomery at training camp in 2015

Montgomery was selected in the third round (94th overall) by the Green Bay Packers in the 2015 NFL draft. On May 21, 2015, he signed his rookie contract with the Packers.

On September 13, Montgomery made his NFL debut against the Chicago Bears and had three kick returns for 106 net yards. Two weeks later against the Kansas City Chiefs, Montgomery had his first professional receiving touchdown. He was placed on injured reserve on December 21, 2015, after sustaining an ankle injury against the San Diego Chargers in Week 6.

Montgomery finished his rookie season with 15 receptions for 136 yards and two touchdowns.

==== 2016 ====
For the first four games of the 2016 season, Montgomery saw only 17 snaps on offense and was held to zero catches. However, in a Week 6 game against the Dallas Cowboys he began seeing time in the backfield due to injuries to running backs Eddie Lacy and James Starks. He finished the game with 10 receptions for 98 yards in the Packers' 30–16 loss. In the next game, Montgomery had another 10-catch performance and rushed for 60 yards on nine carries against the Chicago Bears. After having little playing time as a running back due to a sickle-cell trait, head coach Mike McCarthy declared Montgomery a running back on December 13, 2016. The following week against the Bears, Montgomery recorded career highs in carries (16) and yards (162) along with two touchdowns. He also then passed Aaron Rodgers as the team's leading rusher for the 2016 season. Montgomery finished the 2016 season with 77 carries for 457 yards and three touchdowns to go along with 44 receptions for 348 yards.

==== 2017 ====
On September 10, 2017, in the season opener against the Seattle Seahawks, Montgomery had 19 carries for 54 yards, which included a six-yard rushing touchdown, in the 17–9 victory. In the next game, a 34–23 loss to the Atlanta Falcons, he had 10 rushes for 35 yards and a rushing touchdown to go along with six receptions for 75 yards and a receiving touchdown. The receiving touchdown was Aaron Rodgers' 300th career touchdown pass. Montgomery broke his ribs during Week 4 against the Chicago Bears, an eventual 35–14 victory, and missed the next game at the Cowboys, a 35–31 victory. Montgomery returned for the 23–10 loss at the Minnesota Vikings, but was the backup to emerging rookie running back Aaron Jones. After Jones went down with a knee injury in Week 10 at the Bears, Montgomery came in and had a 37-yard rushing touchdown, but left the game after re-injuring his ribs. After missing the next two games, he was placed on injured reserve on December 1, 2017, after undergoing season-ending surgery for an apparent wrist injury. Montgomery finished the 2017 season with 23 carries for 273 yards and three touchdowns to go along 23 receptions for 173 yards and a touchdown.

==== 2018 ====
During Week 8 against the Los Angeles Rams, the Packers were losing by a score of 29–27 with 2:05 left in the game when Montgomery returned a kick from the endzone and fumbled the ball, which was recovered by the Rams and they went on to win the game. After the game, it was reported that Montgomery had been taken off the field for a drive and was told to take a knee on the kick return. Montgomery would be traded just two days after the game and with less than an hour left before the trade deadline. In seven games with the Packers in 2018, he totaled 26 carries for 105 yards and a touchdown to go along with 15 receptions for 170 yards.

=== Baltimore Ravens ===
On October 30, 2018, Montgomery was traded to the Baltimore Ravens in exchange for a seventh-round pick in the 2020 NFL draft. In six games with the Ravens, he had 83 rushing yards and ten receptions for 65 yards. In the Wild Card Round loss to the Los Angeles Chargers, he had six kick returns for 106 net yards.

=== New York Jets ===
On April 11, 2019, Montgomery signed with the New York Jets. In the 2019 season, Montgomery had 32 carries for 103 yards to go along with 13 receptions for 90 yards.

=== New Orleans Saints ===
Montgomery signed with New Orleans Saints on May 15, 2020. He was placed on injured reserve on September 26 with a hamstring injury. Montgomery was activated on November 6. In the regular season finale against the Carolina Panthers, he rushed for 105 yards during the 33–7 victory.

On March 6, 2021, Montgomery re-signed with the Saints on a one-year contract. In the 2021 season, Montgomery appeared in 14 games and finished with 15 carries for 44 yards and 16 receptions for 95 yards.

=== New England Patriots ===
On March 17, 2022, Montgomery signed a two-year, $3.6 million contract with the New England Patriots. He was placed on injured reserve on September 13.

On August 29, 2023, Montgomery was released by the Patriots and re-signed to the practice squad. He was promoted to the active roster on September 9. On December 8, Montgomery was waived.

On September 20, 2024, Montgomery announced his retirement from football.

== Career statistics ==
=== NFL ===
==== Regular season ====
Year	Team	Games		Receiving					Rushing					Kick return					Fumbles	
Year	Team	GP	GS	Rec	Yds	Avg	Lng	TD	Att	Yds	Avg	Lng	TD	Ret	Yds	Avg	Lng	TD	Fum	Lost
2015	GB	6	3	15	136	9.1	31	2	3	14	4.7	9	0	7	218	31.1	46	0	0	0
2016	GB	15	6	44	348	7.9	24	0	77	457	5.9	61	3	18	366	20.3	40	0	2	1
2017	GB	8	5	23	173	7.5	23	1	71	273	3.8	37	3	0	0	0.0	0	0	0	0
2018	GB	7	0	15	170	11.3	43	0	26	105	4.0	16	1	10	210	21.0	27	0	2	1
2018	BAL	6	0	10	65	6.5	14	0	15	83	5.5	15	0	0	0	0.0	0	0	0	0
2019	NYJ	16	2	13	90	6.9	21	0	32	103	3.2	15	0	18	364	20.2	34	0	0	0
2020	NO	6	1	3	27	9.0	17	0	19	101	5.3	36	0	2	57	28.5	33	0	0	0
2021	NO	14	3	16	95	5.9	21	0	15	44	2.9	9	0	2	59	29.5	33	0	0	0
2022	NE	1	0	3	15	5.0	7	1	2	-2	-1.0	0	0	1	28	28.0	28	0	0	0
Total		79	20	142	1,119	7.9	43	4	260	1,178	4.5	61	7	58	1,302	22.4	46	0	4	2

==== Postseason ====
Year	Team	Games		Receiving					Rushing					Kick return					Fumbles	
Year	Team	GP	GS	Rec	Yds	Avg	Lng	TD	Att	Yds	Avg	Lng	TD	Ret	Yds	Avg	Lng	TD	Fum	Lost
2016	GB	3	3	10	77	7.7	34	0	25	91	3.6	15	2	0	0	0.0	0	0	0	0
2018	BAL	1	0	0	0	0	0	0	0	0	0	0	0	6	106	17.7	24	0	0	0
2020	NO	1	0	1	13	13.0	13	0	4	14	3.5	5	0	0	0	0.0	0	0	0	0
Total		5	3	11	90	8.2	34	0	29	105	3.6	15	2	6	106	17.7	24	0	0	0

=== College ===
Season	Team	Conf	Class	Pos	GP	Receiving				Rushing			
Season	Team	Conf	Class	Pos	GP	Rec	Yds	Avg	TD	Att	Yds	Avg	TD
2011	Stanford	Pac-12	FR	WR	13	24	350	14.6	2	2	42	21.0	1
2012	Stanford	Pac-12	SO	WR	11	26	213	8.2	0	1	−11	−11.0	0
2013	Stanford	Pac-12	JR	WR	14	61	958	15.7	10	13	159	12.2	2
2014	Stanford	Pac-12	SR	WR	11	61	604	9.9	3	23	144	6.3	1
Career					49	172	2,125	12.4	15	39	334	8.6	4

== After the NFL ==
Montgomery retired from football in 2024 to work in the finance and venture capital sector. He is currently an associate for Next Legacy Partners.
