= Malcolm Moran =

American sportswriter

Malcolm Moran is an American sportswriter who has written for four newspapers over 30 years – Newsday, The New York Times, Chicago Tribune and USA Today. In April 2006, Moran was named the inaugural Knight Chair in Sports Journalism and Society in the College of Communications at Penn State.

Moran covered two Olympic Games, 11 Super Bowls, 16 World Series and 26 men's NCAA Final Fours.

Moran has served as president of the United States Basketball Writers Association (USBWA) in 1988–89 when the organization formalized its awards for women and held its first nationally televised presentation of the player of the year awards. He was inducted into the USBWA Hall of Fame in 2005.

Moran is a 1975 graduate of Fordham University.
