= Sandy Barbour =

American athletic administrator

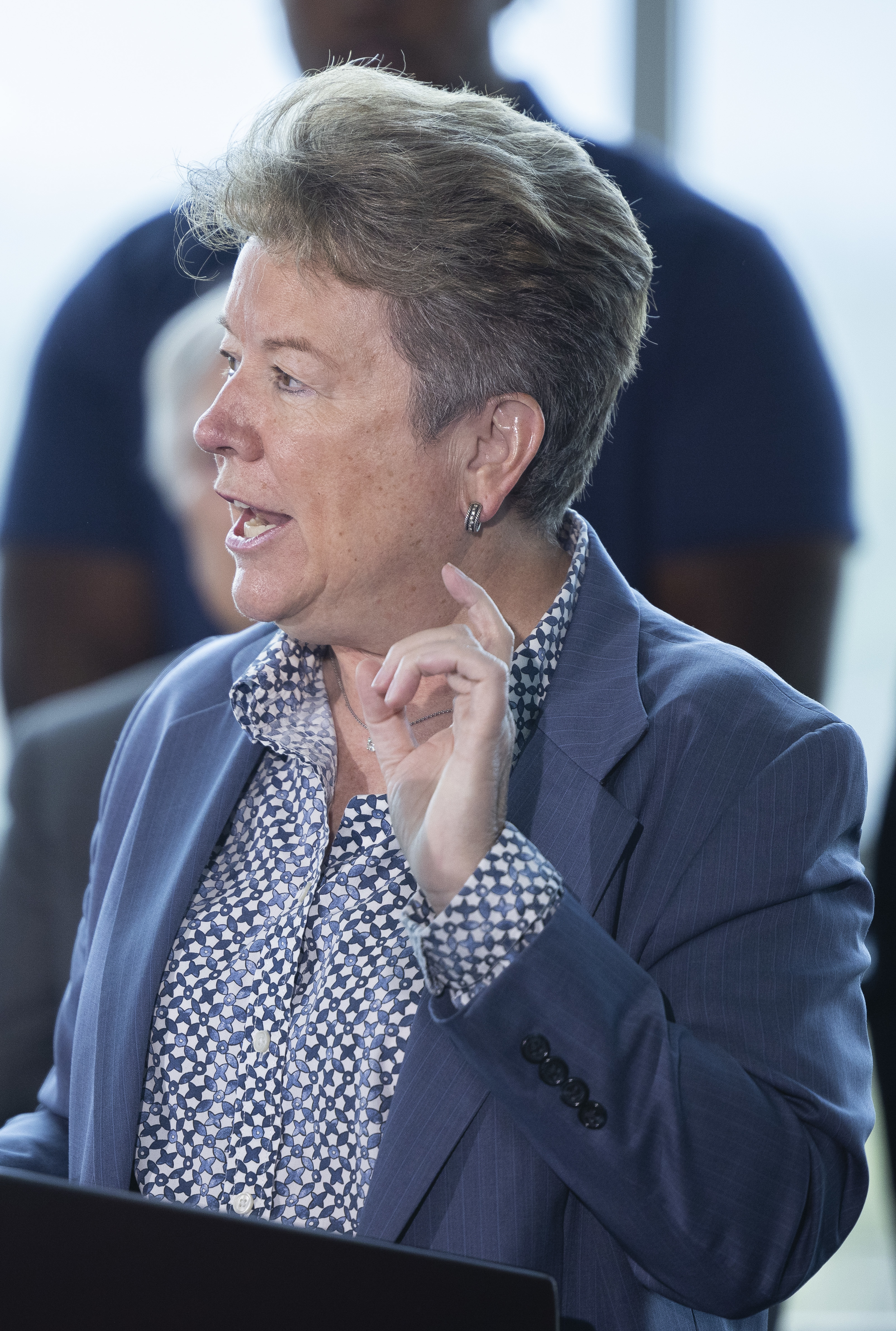

Biographical details
- Born: December 2, 1959 (age 66); Annapolis, Maryland, U.S.
- Education: Wake Forest University (B.S.); University of Massachusetts Amherst (M.S.); Northwestern University (M.B.A.)

Playing career

Field hockey
- 1977–1980: Wake Forest

Basketball
- 1977–1978; 1979–1980: Wake Forest

Coaching career (HC unless noted)

Field hockey
- 1981: UMass (asst.)
- 1982–1984: Northwestern (asst.)

Administrative career (AD unless noted)
- 1982–1984: Northwestern (dir. recruiting services)
- 1984–1989: Northwestern (asst. AD)
- 1991–1996: Tulane (assoc. AD)
- 1996–1999: Tulane
- 2000–2002: Notre Dame (assoc. AD)
- 2002–2004: Notre Dame (deputy AD)
- 2004–2014: California
- 2014–2022: Penn State
- 2025: Utah State (interim AD)

Anne Saunders "Sandy" Barbour (born December 2, 1959) is an American athletic administrator who served as the athletic director at the Pennsylvania State University from 2014 to 2022, the University of California, Berkeley from 2004 to 2014, and Tulane University from 1996 to 1999.

== Utah State ==
On July 18, 2025, Utah State University named Barbour the interim athletic director while it conducts a national search for its next athletics director.

== Penn State ==
Barbour directed the Penn State athletic programs, which have approximately 800 students in 31 sports (16 men’s/15 women’s) and an Intercollegiate Athletics staff of more than 300.

In 2020, Barbour was among the honorees on Sports Illustrated’s "The Unrelenting" list of powerful, influential and outstanding women in sports.

In 2018, she was named one of five finalists for Sports Business Journal’s prestigious Athletic Director of the Year.

Barbour is a member of the NCAA Football Oversight Committee, serving as Chair beginning in July 2021 for a term to end June 2023 and represents the Big Ten Conference on the NCAA Division I Council. In 2017, she was selected as one of the inaugural members of the United States Olympic and Paralympic Committee’s (USOC) Collegiate Sports Sustainability Think Tank. The Think Tank is charged with bridging the gap between high-contributing collegiate stakeholders and the Olympic Movement.

In March 2022, Barbour announced she would retire from Penn State in Summer 2022.

== Cal and Tulane ==
Barbour was the director of athletics at Cal from 2004-14. In 2011, she announced plans to eliminate the men’s baseball program at Cal, in order to stay in compliance with Title IX funding regulations. Cal played in the College Baseball World Series that season. Jeff Kent, niw a Hall of Fame professional baseball player (primarily San Francisco Giants) and alumni of Cal baseball, interceded and bankrolled the Cal baseball program -saving it from elimination.

Barbour served as athletic director at Tulane University from 1996 until resigning in 1999, having joined the staff as an associate athletic director in 1991.
