= 2013 Utah Utes football team =

American college football season

2013 Utah Utes football
- Conference: Pac-12 Conference
- South Division
- Record: 5–7 (2–7 Pac-12)
- Head coach: Kyle Whittingham (9th season)
- Co-offensive coordinators: Brian Johnson (2nd season); Dennis Erickson (1st season)
- Offensive scheme: Multiple
- Defensive coordinator: Kalani Sitake (5th season)
- Base defense: 4–3
- Home stadium: Rice-Eccles Stadium

2013 Pac-12 Conference football standings
	Conf.			Overall
Team	W		L	W		L
North Division
No. 11 Stanford xy$	7	–	2	11	–	3
No. 9 Oregon x	7	–	2	11	–	2
No. 25 Washington	5	–	4	9	–	4
Oregon State	4	–	5	7	–	6
Washington State	4	–	5	6	–	7
California	0	–	9	1	–	11
South Division
No. 21 Arizona State xy	8	–	1	10	–	4
No. 16 UCLA	6	–	3	10	–	3
No. 19 USC	6	–	3	10	–	4
Arizona	4	–	5	8	–	5
Utah	2	–	7	5	–	7
Colorado	1	–	8	4	–	8
Championship: Stanford 38, Arizona State 14
$ – BCS representative as conference champion; x – Division champion/co-champions; y – Championship game participant; Rankings from AP Poll

The 2013 Utah Utes football team represented the University of Utah during the 2013 NCAA Division I FBS football season. The team was headed by ninth year head coach Kyle Whittingham and played their home games in Rice-Eccles Stadium in Salt Lake City, Utah. They were members of the South Division of the Pac-12 Conference. The team finished with a 5–7 record. This would be Utah's last losing season until 2024.

== Schedule ==
Date	Time	Opponent	Site	TV	Result	Attendance
August 29	6:00 p.m.	Utah State*	Rice-Eccles Stadium; Salt Lake City, UT (Beehive Boot/Battle of the Brothers)	FS1	W 30–26	45,237
September 7	12:00 p.m.	Weber State*	Rice-Eccles Stadium; Salt Lake City, UT	P12N	W 70–7	45,053
September 14	8:00 p.m.	Oregon State^{†}	Rice-Eccles Stadium; Salt Lake City, UT	FS1	L 48–51 ^{OT}	45,221
September 21	8:15 p.m.	at BYU*	LaVell Edwards Stadium; Provo, UT (Holy War)	ESPN2	W 20–13	63,470
October 3	8:00 p.m.	No. 12 UCLA	Rice-Eccles Stadium; Salt Lake City, UT	FS1	L 27–34	45,272
October 12	4:00 p.m.	No. 5 Stanford	Rice-Eccles Stadium; Salt Lake City, UT	P12N	W 27–21	45,372
October 19	8:00 p.m.	at Arizona	Arizona Stadium; Tucson, AZ	P12N	L 24–35	50,871
October 26	2:00 p.m.	at USC	Los Angeles Memorial Coliseum; Los Angeles, CA	P12N	L 3–19	64,715
November 9	2:00 p.m.	No. 23 Arizona State	Rice-Eccles Stadium; Salt Lake City, UT	P12N	L 19–20	45,183
November 16	2:00 p.m.	at No. 6 Oregon	Autzen Stadium; Eugene, OR	FS1	L 21–44	56,481
November 23	1:30 p.m.	at Washington State	Martin Stadium; Pullman, WA	P12N	L 37–49	23,112
November 30	12:00 p.m.	Colorado	Rice-Eccles Stadium; Salt Lake City, UT (Rumble in the Rockies)	P12N	W 24–17	45,023
*Non-conference game; ^{†}Homecoming; Rankings from AP Poll released prior to game; All times are in Mountain time

== Rankings ==
Ranking movements Legend: ██ Increase in ranking ██ Decrease in ranking — = Not ranked RV = Received votes
	Week																
Poll	Pre	1	2	3	4	5	6	7	8	9	10	11	12	13	14	15	Final
AP	—	—	—	—	—	—	—	RV	RV	—	—	—	—	—	—	—	—
Coaches	—	—	RV	—	RV	RV	—	RV	—	—	—	—	—	—	—	—	—
Harris	Not released							RV	—	—	—	—	—	—	—	—	Not released
BCS	Not released								—	—	—	—	—	—	—	—	Not released

== Game summaries ==
=== Utah State ===
Utah State at Utah

Team	1	2	3	4	Total
Aggies	3	14	6	3	26
• Utes	14	0	10	6	30

- Date: August 31
- Location: Rice-Eccles Stadium
  Salt Lake City, UT
- Game start: 6:06 p.m. MST
- Elapsed time: 3:31
- Game attendance: 45,237
- Game weather: 90 °F (32 °C), Partly Cloudy, winds NW at 6mph
- Referee: Kevin Marr
- TV announcers (FS1): Justin Kutcher, Petros Papadakis, and Kristina Pink

Scoring summary
1	11:47	UTAH	Dres Anderson 3-yard touchdown pass from Travis Wilson, Andy Phillips kick good	UTAH 7–0
1	7:37	USU	Nick Diaz 27-yard Field Goal	UTAH 7–3
1	1:37	UTAH	Jake Murphy 30-yard touchdown pass from Travis Wilson, Andy Phillips kick good	UTAH 14–3
2	14:11	USU	Brand Swindall 15-yard touchdown pass from Chuckie Keeton, Nick Diaz kick good	UTAH 14–10
2	0:20	USU	Brand Swindall 4-yard touchdown pass from Chuckie Keeton, Nick Diaz kick good	USU 17–14
3	11:52	USU	Chuckie Keeton 15-yard touchdown run, Nick Diaz kick failed	USU 23–14
3	2:24	UTAH	Andy Phillips 45-yard Field Goal	USU 23–17
3	0:54	UTAH	Karl Williams 2-yard touchdown run, Andy Phillips kick good	UTAH 24–23
4	10:39	USU	Nick Diaz 24-yard Field Goal	USU 26–24
4	6:38	UTAH	Andy Phillips 19-yard Field Goal	UTAH 27–26
4	0:19	UTAH	Andy Phillips 38-yard Field Goal	UTAH 30–26

=== Weber State ===
Weber State at Utah

Team	1	2	3	4	Total
Wildcats	0	0	7	0	7
• Utes	14	35	14	7	70

- Date: September 7
- Location: Rice-Eccles Stadium
  Salt Lake City, UT
- Game start: 12:07 p.m. MST
- Elapsed time: 3:06
- Game attendance: 45,053
- Game weather: 79 °F (26 °C), Partly Cloudy, winds WNW @ 8mph
- Referee: Land Clark
- TV announcers (P12N): Matt McConnell and Jamal Anderson

Scoring summary
1	9:07	UTAH	Travis Wilson 38-yard touchdown run, Andy Phillips kick good	UTAH 7–0
1	5:13	UTAH	Sean Fitzgerald 80-yard touchdown pass from Travis Wilson, Andy Phillips kick good	UTAH 14–0
2	9:59	UTAH	Kelvin York 24-yard touchdown run, Andy Phillips kick good	UTAH 21–0
2	5:50	UTAH	Dres Anderson 57-yard touchdown pass from Travis Wilson, Andy Phillips kick good	UTAH 28–0
2	3:08	UTAH	Travis Wilson 51-yard touchdown run, Andy Phillips kick good	UTAH 35–0
2	2:57	UTAH	Mike Honeycutt 21-yard fumble return for a touchdown, Andy Phillips kick good	UTAH 42–0
2	0:04	UTAH	Sean Fitzgerald 1-yard touchdown pass from Travis Wilson, Andy Phillips kick good	UTAH 49–0
3	12:31	UTAH	Lucky Radley 17-yard touchdown run, Andy Phillips kick good	UTAH 56–0
3	7:17	WSU	Josh Booker 3-yard touchdown run, Carson Fackrell kick good	UTAH 56–7
3	3:47	UTAH	Lucky Radley 11-yard touchdown run, Andy Phillips kick good	UTAH 63–7
4	1:43	UTAH	Marcus Williams 1-yard touchdown run, Andy Phillips kick good	UTAH 70–7

=== Oregon State ===
Oregon State at Utah

Team	1	2	3	4	OT	Total
• Beavers	10	10	14	11	6	51
Utes	0	10	14	21	3	48

- Date: September 14
- Location: Rice-Eccles Stadium
  Salt Lake City, UT
- Game start: 8:05 p.m. MST
- Elapsed time: 3:43
- Game attendance: 45,221
- Game weather: 63 °F (17 °C), Party Cloudy w/ Rain, Winds ESE 1mph
- Referee: Terry Leyden
- TV announcers (FS1): Craig Bolerjack, Joey Harrington & Ryan Nece

Scoring summary
1	11:21	OSU	Trevor Romaine 36-yard Field Goal	OSU 3–0
1	1:58	OSU	Richard Mullaney 7-yard touchdown pass from Sean Mannion, Trevor Romaine kick good	OSU 10–0
2	13:09	OSU	Trevor Romaine 13-yard Field Goal	OSU 13–0
2	10:03	UTAH	Dres Anderson 49-yard touchdown pass from Travis Wilson, Andy Phillips kick good	OSU 13–7
2	3:20	OSU	Connor Hamlett 7-yard touchdown pass from Sean Mannion, Trevor Romaine kick good	OSU 20–7
2	0:20	UTAH	Andy Phillips 27-yard Field Goal	OSU 20–10
3	14:06	OSU	Sean Martin 27-yard Interception returned for a touchdown, Trevor Romaine kick good	OSU 27–10
3	12:49	UTAH	Travis Wilson 35-yard touchdown run, Andy Phillips kick good	OSU 27–17
3	4:49	UTAH	James Poole 1-yard touchdown run, Andy Phillips kick good kick good	OSU 27–24
3	1:04	OSU	Brandin Cooks 55-yard touchdown pass from Sean Mannion, Trevor Romaine kick good	OSU 34–24
4	13:41	UTAH	Luckey Radley 15-yard touchdown pass from Travis Wilson, Andy Phillips kick good	OSU 34–31
4	10:01	OSU	Trevor Romaine 20-yard Field Goal	OSU 37–31
4	4:25	UTAH	Travis Wilson 25-yard touchdown run, Andy Phillips kick good	UTAH 38–37
4	2:29	OSU	Brandin Cooks 18-yard touchdown pass from Sean Mannion, Connor Hamlett PAT Pass good	OSU 45–38
4	0:21	UTAH	Travis Wilson 9-yard touchdown run, Andy Phillips kick good	Tied 45–45
OT		UTAH	Andy Phillips 41-yard Field Goal	UTAH 48–45
OT		OSU	Brandin Cooks 6-yard touchdown pass from Sean Mannion	OSU 51–45

=== BYU ===
Utah at BYU

Team	1	2	3	4	Total
• Utes	3	10	0	7	20
Cougars	0	0	6	7	13

- Date: September 21
- Location: LaVell Edwards Stadium
  Provo, UT
- Game start: 8:21 p.m. MST
- Elapsed time: 3:26
- Game attendance: 63,470
- Game weather: 73 °F (23 °C), Cloudy, winds S at 12mph
- Referee: Jack Folliard
- TV announcers (ESPN2/BYUtv): Mark Jones, Brock Huard, and Lewis Johnson (ESPN2)
  Dave McCann, Blaine Fowler, Kathy Aiken, and Spencer Linton (BYUtv)

Scoring summary
1	1:30	UTAH	Andy Phillips 36-yard Field Goal	UTAH 3–0
2	8:05	UTAH	Andy Phillips 32-yard Field Goal	UTAH 6–0
2	1:17	UTAH	Anthony Denham 1-yard touchdown pass from Travis Wilson, Andy Phillips kick good	UTAH 13–0
3	11:39	BYU	Justin Sorensen 32-yard Field Goal	UTAH 13–3
3	5:39	BYU	Justin Sorensen 31-yard Field Goal	UTAH 13–6
4	12:44	UTAH	Karl Williams 2-yard Touchdown pass from Travis Wilson, Andy Phillips kick good	UTAH 20–6
4	5:13	BYU	{{{Event}}}	UTAH 20–13

=== UCLA ===
	1	2	3	4	Total
#12 Bruins	7	14	3	10	34
Utes	14	3	0	10	27

In this series, UCLA has a 9–2 overall record and 3–2 in Salt Lake City. Utah has won two of the last three games with UCLA (2007 and 2011, under Kyle Whittingham). UCLA won last year 21–14.

1st quarter scoring: UCLA – Jordon James 1-yard run (Kaʻimi Fairbairn kick); Utah – Dres Anderson 54-yard pass from Travis Wilson (Andy Phillips kick); Utah – Sean Fitzgerald 6-yard pass from Wilson (Phillips kick)

2nd quarter scoring: UCLA – Brett Hundley 7-yard pass to Devin Fuller (Fairbairn kick); UCLA – Jordan Payton 17-yard pass from Hundley (Fairbairn kick); Utah – Phillips 44-yard field goal

3rd quarter scoring: UCLA – Fairbairn 33-yard field goal

4th quarter scoring: Utah – Keith McGill 19-yard interception of Hundley pass (Phillips); UCLA – Fairbairn 47-yard field goal; UCLA – Hundley 36-yard run (Fairbairn kick); UCLA – Hundley 36-yard run (Fairbairn kick); Utah – Phillips 44-yard field goal

=== Stanford ===
	1	2	3	4	Total
#5 Cardinal	14	0	0	7	21
Utes	14	7	3	3	27

1st quarter scoring: STAN – T. Gaffney 1-yard run (J. Williamson kick); UTAH – Karl Williams 4-yard pass from Travis Wilson (Andy Phillips kick); STAN – T. Montgomery 100-yard kickoff return (Williamson kick); UTAH – Dres Anderson 51-yard pass from Wilson (Phillips kick)

2nd quarter scoring: UTAH – Anderson 3-yard run (Phillips kick)

3rd quarter scoring: UTAH – Phillips 23-yard field goal

4th quarter scoring: UTAH – Phillips 48-yard field goal; STAN – D. Cajuste 7-yard pass from K. Hogan (Williamson kick)

=== Arizona ===
	1	2	3	4	Total
Utes	7	0	14	3	24
Wildcats	7	13	0	15	35

=== USC ===
	1	2	3	4	Total
Utes	3	0	0	0	3
Trojans	7	9	3	0	19

1st quarter scoring: UTAH – Andy Phillips 42-yard field goal; USC – Nelson Agholor 30-yard pass from Cody Kessler (Andre Heidari kick)

2nd quarter scoring: USC – Heidari 35-yard field goal; USC – Heidari 38-yard field goal; USC – Heidari 28-yard field goal

3rd quarter scoring: USC – Heidari 40-yard field goal

4th quarter scoring: None

=== Arizona State ===
	1	2	3	4	Total
#23 Sun Devils	7	0	0	13	20
Utes	6	3	10	0	19

=== Oregon ===
	1	2	3	4	Total
Utah	0	7	7	7	21
#6 Oregon	10	7	20	7	44

Oregon leads the series with Utah 18-8 (0.692). The series began in 1933 at Oregon, Oregon 23, Utah 7. The last meeting was the 2009 game at Oregon, Oregon 31, Utah 24.

1st quarter scoring: ORE – De'Anthony Thomas 8-yard pass from Marcus Mariota (Matt Wogan kick); ORE – Wogan 31-yard field goal

2nd quarter scoring: UTAH – Jake Murphy 34-yard pass from Adam Schulz (Andy Phillips kick); ORE – Josh Huff 5-yard pass from Mariota (Wogan kick)

3rd quarter scoring: UTAH – Schulz 4-yard run (Phillips kick); ORE – Thomas 86-yard kick return (Wogan kick missed); ORE – John Mundt 14-yard pass from Mariota (Wogan kick); ORE – Byron Marshall 17-yard run (Wogan kick)

4th quarter scoring: ORE – Marshall 16-yard run (Wogan kick); UTAH – Bubba Poole 10-yard run (Phillips kick)

=== Washington State ===
	1	2	3	4	Total
Utes	7	13	10	7	37
Cougars	21	12	10	6	49
