= Michael Rector =

American football player (born 1993)

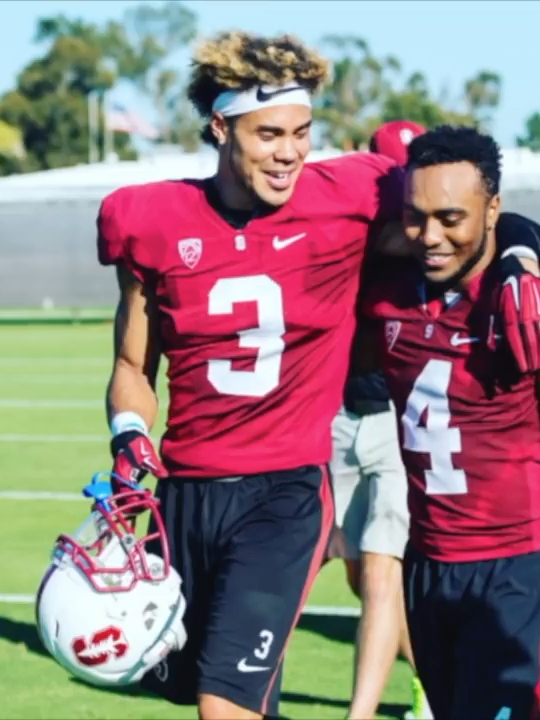
- Rector (left) with Stanford in 2016

No. 84
- Position: Wide receiver

Personal information
- Born: December 16, 1993 (age 32); Tacoma, Washington
- Listed height: 6 ft 0 in (1.83 m)
- Listed weight: 193 lb (88 kg)

Career information
- High school: Tacoma (WA) Bellarmine
- College: Stanford
- NFL draft: 2017: undrafted

Career history
- Detroit Lions (2017)*
- * Offseason or practice squad member only

Michael Rector (born December 16, 1993) is an American former football wide receiver. He played college football at Stanford.

== Professional career ==
Rector signed with the Detroit Lions as an undrafted free agent on May 12, 2017. He was waived by the Lions on September 2, 2017.
