= 2014 New York Giants season =

90th season in franchise history

- Owner: John Mara; Steve Tisch
- General manager: Jerry Reese
- Head coach: Tom Coughlin
- Home stadium: MetLife Stadium

Results
- Record: 6–10
- Division place: 3rd NFC East
- Playoffs: Did not qualify
- Pro Bowlers: WR Odell Beckham Jr.

Uniform
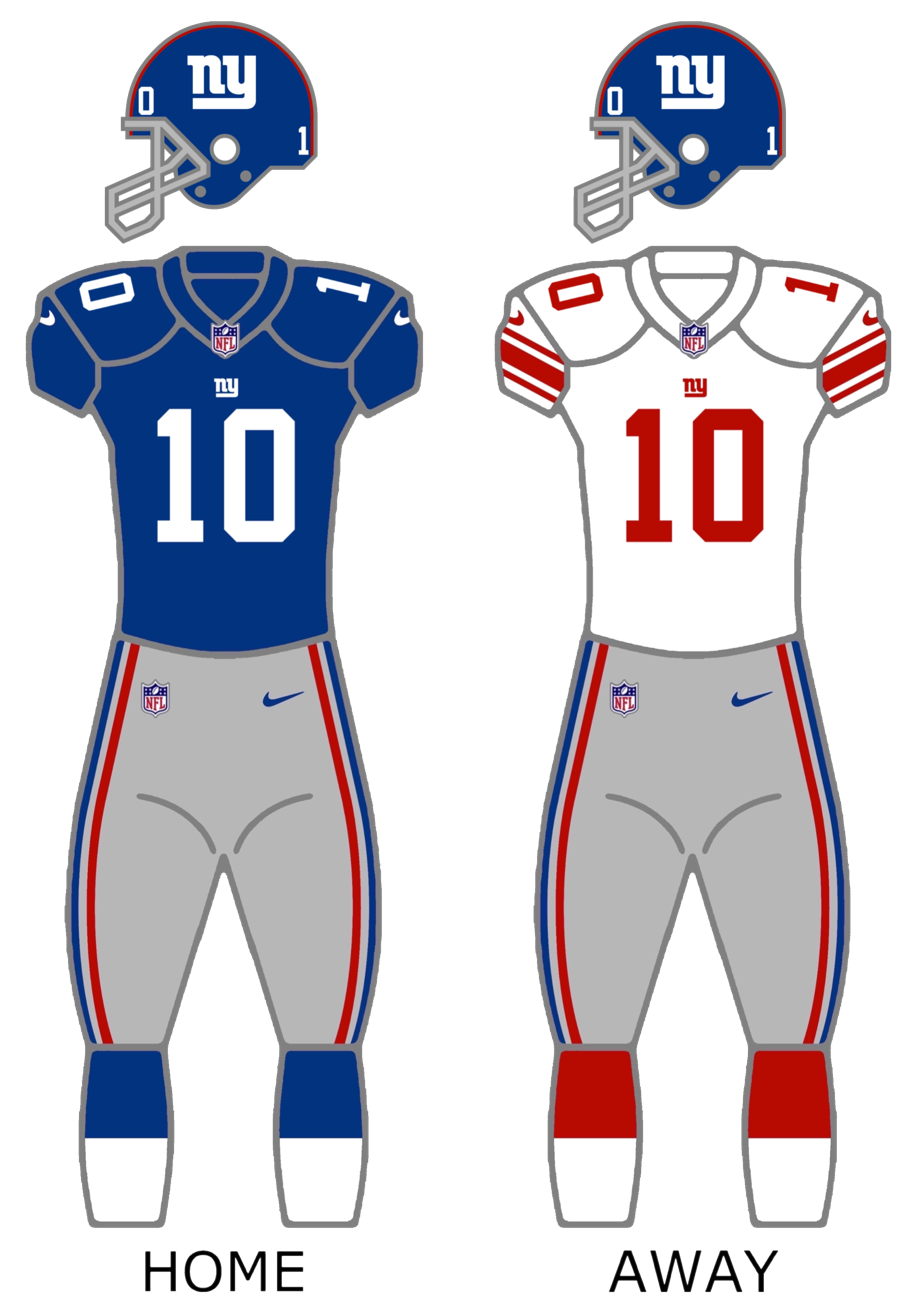

The 2014 season was the New York Giants' 90th in the National Football League (NFL), their fifth playing home games at MetLife Stadium and their 11th under head coach Tom Coughlin. The team failed to improve on their 7–9 record from 2013, finishing 6–10 (their first double-digit loss total since 2004).

To commemorate their 90th anniversary, the Giants wore a special patch on their jerseys. In addition, the team wore white pants instead of gray for two home games against the Indianapolis Colts in Week 9 on Monday Night Football and two weeks later against the San Francisco 49ers. With their loss to the Jacksonville Jaguars on November 30, 2014, the Giants sealed their second consecutive losing season and suffered back to back losing seasons for the first time since 2003 and 2004 seasons.

The Giants had a seven-game losing streak in the middle of the season, their longest since 2004, and a league-leading 22 players on the injured reserve list, including star wide receiver Victor Cruz, by the end of the season.

== Draft ==
2014 New York Giants draft
Round	Pick	Player	Position	College	Notes
1	12	Odell Beckham Jr. *	Wide receiver	LSU	
2	43	Weston Richburg	Center	Colorado State	
3	74	Jay Bromley	Defensive tackle	Syracuse	
4	113	Andre Williams	Running back	Boston College	
5	152	Nat Berhe	Safety	San Diego State	
5	174	Devon Kennard	Linebacker	USC	Compensatory
6	187	Bennett Jackson	Cornerback	Notre Dame	
Made roster † Pro Football Hall of Fame * Made at least one Pro Bowl during career

Notes

- The Giants traded their seventh-round selection (No. 225 overall) to the Carolina Panthers in exchange for linebacker Jon Beason.

== Staff ==
2014 New York Giants staff
Front office: President/CEO – John Mara; Chairman/executive vice president – Steve Tisch; Senior vice president/general manager – Jerry Reese; Senior vice president of player personnel – Chris Mara; Assistant general manager – Kevin Abrams; Director of pro personnel – Ken Sternfeld; Director of player development – David Tyree; Director of college scouting – Marc Ross; Director of football operations – Matt Harriss; Head coaches: Head coach – Tom Coughlin; Offensive coaches: Offensive coordinator – Ben McAdoo; Quarterbacks – Danny Langsdorf; Running backs – Craig Johnson; Wide receivers – Sean Ryan; Tight ends – Kevin Gilbride; Offensive line – Pat Flaherty; Assistant offensive line – Lunda Wells; Offensive assistant – Ryan Roeder	Defensive coaches: Defensive coordinator – Perry Fewell; Defensive line – Robert Nunn; Linebackers – Jim Herrmann; Secondary/cornerbacks – Peter Giunta; Secondary/safeties – David Merritt; Defensive assistant – Rob Leonard; Special teams coaches: Special teams coordinator – Tom Quinn; Assistant special teams – Larry Izzo; Strength and conditioning: Strength and conditioning – Jerry Palmieri; Assistant strength and conditioning – Markus Paul; Strength and conditioning assistant – Joe Danos

== Final roster ==
2014 New York Giants roster
Quarterbacks (QB): 10 Eli Manning; 9 Ryan Nassib; Running backs (RB): 43 Orleans Darkwa; 45 Henry Hynoski FB; 23 Rashad Jennings; 47 Chris Ogbonnaya; 44 Andre Williams; Wide receivers (WR): 13 Odell Beckham Jr.; 15 Kevin Ogletree; 83 Preston Parker; 82 Rueben Randle; 88 Corey Washington; Tight ends (TE): 89 Jerome Cunningham; 84 Larry Donnell; 85 Daniel Fells; 81 Adrien Robinson	Offensive linemen (OL): 65 Will Beatty T; 60 Adam Gettis G; 62 Eric Herman G; 77 John Jerry G; 75 Brandon Mosley T/G; 67 Justin Pugh T; 61 Dallas Reynolds C/G; 70 Weston Richburg G; 55 J. D. Walton C; Defensive linemen (DL): 96 Jay Bromley DT; 79 Dominique Hamilton DT; 95 Johnathan Hankins DT; 71 Paul Hazel DE; 99 Cullen Jenkins DE/DT; 78 Markus Kuhn DT; 98 Damontre Moore DE; 93 Mike Patterson DT; 90 Jason Pierre-Paul DE; 72 Kerry Wynn DE	Linebackers (LB): 46 James Davidson OLB; 58 Mark Herzlich OLB; 59 Devon Kennard OLB; 53 Jameel McClain MLB; 54 Spencer Paysinger OLB; Defensive backs (DB): 31 Zack Bowman CB; 34 Nat Berhe SS; 39 Chykie Brown CB; 27 Stevie Brown FS; 35 Quintin Demps FS; 48 Chandler Fenner CB; 37 Mike Harris CB; 28 Jayron Hosley CB; 21 Dominique Rodgers-Cromartie CB; 26 Antrel Rolle SS; Special teams (ST): 3 Josh Brown K; 51 Zak DeOssie LS; 5 Steve Weatherford P	Practice squad: 64 Michael Bamiro T; 17 Juron Criner WR; 8 Thomas Gordon FS; 25 Victor Hampton CB; 86 Chris Harper WR; 36 Bennett Jackson CB (IR); 66 Jordan Stanton DE; 19 Julian Talley WR; -- Uani 'Unga LB; 41 Josh Victorian CB; 49 Nikita Whitlock FB; Reserve: 20 Prince Amukamara CB (IR); 91 Robert Ayers DE (IR); 52 Jon Beason MLB (IR); 73 James Brewer T (IR); 29 Michael Cox RB (IR); 80 Victor Cruz WR (IR); -- Rogers Gaines T (IR); 18 Marcus Harris WR (IR); 33 Peyton Hillis RB (IR); -- Travis Howard CB (IR); 12 Jerrel Jernigan WR (IR); 94 Mathias Kiwanuka DE (IR); 70 Troy Kropog T (IR); 97 Terrell Manning MLB (IR); 38 Trumaine McBride CB (IR); 74 Geoff Schwartz T (IR); 68 Adam Snyder G (IR); 30 Cooper Taylor SS (IR); 24 Walter Thurmond CB (IR); 57 Jacquian Williams OLB (IR); 22 David Wilson RB (IR); Rookies in italics 53 active, 22 reserve, 10 practice squad

== Schedule ==
=== Preseason ===
Week	Date	Opponent	Result	Record	Venue	Recap
HOF	August 3	vs. Buffalo Bills	**W** 17–13	1–0	Fawcett Stadium (Canton)	Recap
1	August 9	Pittsburgh Steelers	**W** 20–16	2–0	MetLife Stadium	Recap
2	August 16	at Indianapolis Colts	**W** 27–26	3–0	Lucas Oil Stadium	Recap
3	August 22	at New York Jets	**W** 35–24	4–0	MetLife Stadium	Recap
4	August 28	New England Patriots	**W** 16–13	5–0	MetLife Stadium	Recap

=== Regular season ===
Week	Date	Opponent	Result	Record	Venue	Recap
1	September 8	at Detroit Lions	**L** 14–35	0–1	Ford Field	Recap
2	September 14	Arizona Cardinals	**L** 14–25	0–2	MetLife Stadium	Recap
3	September 21	Houston Texans	**W** 30–17	1–2	MetLife Stadium	Recap
4	September 25	at **Washington Redskins**	**W** 45–14	2–2	FedExField	Recap
5	October 5	Atlanta Falcons	**W** 30–20	3–2	MetLife Stadium	Recap
6	October 12	at **Philadelphia Eagles**	**L** 0–27	3–3	Lincoln Financial Field	Recap
7	October 19	at **Dallas Cowboys**	**L** 21–31	3–4	AT&T Stadium	Recap
8	Bye					
9	November 3	Indianapolis Colts	**L** 24–40	3–5	MetLife Stadium	Recap
10	November 9	at Seattle Seahawks	**L** 17–38	3–6	CenturyLink Field	Recap
11	November 16	San Francisco 49ers	**L** 10–16	3–7	MetLife Stadium	Recap
12	November 23	**Dallas Cowboys**	**L** 28–31	3–8	MetLife Stadium	Recap
13	November 30	at Jacksonville Jaguars	**L** 24–25	3–9	EverBank Field	Recap
14	December 7	at Tennessee Titans	**W** 36–7	4–9	LP Field	Recap
15	December 14	**Washington Redskins**	**W** 24–13	5–9	MetLife Stadium	Recap
16	December 21	at St. Louis Rams	**W** 37–27	6–9	Edward Jones Dome	Recap
17	December 28	**Philadelphia Eagles**	**L** 26–34	6–10	MetLife Stadium	Recap

Note: Intra-division opponents are in bold text.

=== Game summaries ===
==== Week 1: at Detroit Lions ====
Week One: New York Giants at Detroit Lions – Game summary

Quarter	1	2	3	4	Total
Giants	0	7	0	7	**14**
**Lions**	14	0	13	8	**35**

at Ford Field, Detroit, Michigan

- Date: September 8
- Game time: 7:10 p.m. EDT
- Game weather: Played indoors (dome stadium)
- Game attendance: 64,401
- Referee: Clete Blakeman
- TV announcers (ESPN): Mike Tirico, Jon Gruden and Lisa Salters
- Recap, Gamebook

Game information

**First quarter**

- DET – Calvin Johnson 67-yard pass from Matthew Stafford (Nate Freese kick), 12:11. Lions 7–0. **Drive: 4 plays, 80 yards, 2:49.**
- DET – Calvin Johnson 16-yard pass from Matthew Stafford (Nate Freese kick), 5:12. Lions 14–0. **Drive: 9 plays, 69 yards, 5:23.**

**Second quarter**

- NYG – Larry Donnell 1-yard pass from Eli Manning (Josh Brown kick), 12:54. Lions 14–7. **Drive: 13 plays, 79 yards, 4:56.**

**Third quarter**

- DET – Nate Freese 28-yard field goal, 11:54. Lions 17–7. **Drive: 4 plays, 8 yards, 1:37.**
- DET – Nate Freese 27-yard field goal, 5:50. Lions 20–7. **Drive: 9 plays, 66 yards, 4:02.**
- DET – Matthew Stafford 1-yard run (Nate Freese kick), 3:51. Lions 27–7. **Drive: 5 plays, 19 yards, 1:41.**

**Fourth quarter**

- NYG – Rashad Jennings 1-yard run (Josh Brown kick), 11:53. Lions 27–14. **Drive: 14 plays, 80 yards, 6:56.**
- DET – Joique Bell 3-yard run (Matthew Stafford-Joseph Fauria pass), 4:39. Lions 35–14. **Drive: 12 plays, 80 yards, 7:14.**

**Top passers**

- NYG – Eli Manning - 18/33, 163 yards, TD, 2 INT
- DET – Matthew Stafford - 22/32, 346 yards, 2 TD

**Top rushers**

- NYG – Rashad Jennings - 16 rushes, 46 yards, TD
- DET – Joique Bell - 15 rushes, 51 yards, TD

**Top receivers**

- NYG – Larry Donnell - 5 receptions, 56 yards, TD
- DET – Calvin Johnson - 7 receptions, 164 yards, 2 TD

The Lions routed the Giants 35-14. With the loss, the Giants opened the season with an 0-1 record.

==== Week 2: vs. Arizona Cardinals ====
Week Two: Arizona Cardinals at New York Giants – Game summary

Quarter	1	2	3	4	Total
**Cardinals**	10	0	0	15	**25**
Giants	0	7	7	0	**14**

at MetLife Stadium, East Rutherford, New Jersey

- Date: September 14
- Game time: 1:00 p.m. EDT
- Game weather: 66 °F (19 °C), sunny
- Game attendance: 78,344
- Referee: John Parry
- TV announcers (Fox): Kevin Burkhardt, John Lynch and Pam Oliver
- Recap, Gamebook

Game information

**First quarter**

- ARI – Jonathan Dwyer 1-yard run (Chandler Catanzaro kick), 10:18. Cardinals 7–0. **Drive: 11 plays, 80 yards, 4:42.**
- ARI – Chandler Catanzaro 49-yard field goal, 1:31. Cardinals 10–0. **Drive: 10 plays, 40 yards, 5:07.**

**Second quarter**

- NYG – Rueben Randle 7-yard pass from Eli Manning (Josh Brown kick), 0:37. Cardinals 10–7. **Drive: 13 plays, 90 yards, 7:13.**

**Third quarter**

- NYG – Daniel Fells 1-yard pass from Eli Manning (Josh Brown kick), 2:03. Giants 14–10. **Drive: 8 plays, 74 yards, 4:37.**

**Fourth quarter**

- ARI – Chandler Catanzaro 37-yard field goal, 11:38. Giants 14–13. **Drive: 13 plays, 74 yards, 5:25.**
- ARI – Ted Ginn Jr. 71-yard punt return (run failed), 10:10. Cardinals 19–14.
- ARI – Chandler Catanzaro 32-yard field goal, 9:11. Cardinals 22–14. **Drive: 4 plays, 7 yards, 0:51.**
- ARI – Chandler Catanzaro 33-yard field goal, 1:31. Cardinals 25–14. **Drive: 4 plays, 5 yards, 1:23.**

**Top passers**

- ARI – Drew Stanton - 14/29, 167 yards
- NYG – Eli Manning - 26/39, 277 yards, 2 TD, 2 INT

**Top rushers**

- ARI – Andre Ellington - 15 rushes, 91 yards
- NYG – Rashad Jennings - 18 rushes, 64 yards

**Top receivers**

- ARI – Larry Fitzgerald - 6 receptions, 51 yards
- NYG – Larry Donnell - 7 receptions, 81 yards

==== Week 3: vs. Houston Texans ====
Week Three: Houston Texans at New York Giants – Game summary

Quarter	1	2	3	4	Total
Texans	0	0	10	7	**17**
**Giants**	0	14	3	13	**30**

at MetLife Stadium, East Rutherford, New Jersey

- Date: September 21
- Game time: 1:00 p.m. EDT
- Game weather: 70 °F (21 °C), cloudy
- Game attendance: 77,462
- Referee: Terry McAulay
- TV announcers (CBS): Ian Eagle, Dan Fouts and Jenny Dell
- Recap, Gamebook

Game information

**First quarter**

- No scoring plays.

**Second quarter**

- NYG – Victor Cruz 26-yard pass from Eli Manning (Josh Brown kick), 3:21. Giants 7–0. **Drive: 9 plays, 83 yards, 4:23.**
- NYG – Rashad Jennings 1-yard run (Josh Brown kick), 1:07. Giants 14–0. **Drive: 3 plays, 2 yards, 0:41.**

**Third quarter**

- NYG – Josh Brown 39-yard field goal, 10:39. Giants 17–0. **Drive: 6 plays, 24 yards, 2:34.**
- HOU – Randy Bullock 27-yard field goal, 6:09. Giants 17–3. **Drive: 9 plays, 71 yards, 4:30.**
- HOU – Damaris Johnson 44-yard pass from Ryan Fitzpatrick (Randy Bullock kick), 2:13. Giants 17–10. **Drive: 4 plays, 93 yards, 2:03.**

**Fourth quarter**

- NYG – Josh Brown 29-yard field goal, 12:19. Giants 20–10. **Drive: 10 plays, 66 yards, 4:54.**
- NYG – Daniel Fells 9-yard pass from Eli Manning (Josh Brown kick), Giants 27–10. **Drive: 3 plays, 29 yards, 1:06.**
- NYG – Josh Brown 31-yard field goal, 5:33. Giants 30–10. **Drive: 7 plays, 16 yards, 3:39.**
- HOU – Ryan Fitzpatrick 1-yard run (Randy Bullock kick), 2:00. Giants 30–17. **Drive: 8 plays, 80 yards, 3:33.**

**Top passers**

- HOU – Ryan Fitzpatrick - 20/34, 289 yards, TD, 3 INT
- NYG – Eli Manning - 21/28, 234 yards, 2 TD

**Top rushers**

- HOU – Alfred Blue - 13 rushes, 78 yards
- NYG – Rashad Jennings - 34 rushes, 176 yards, TD

**Top receivers**

- HOU – DeAndre Hopkins - 6 receptions, 116 yards
- NYG – Victor Cruz – 5 receptions, 107 yards, TD

==== Week 4: at Washington Redskins ====
Week Four: New York Giants at Washington Redskins – Game summary

Quarter	1	2	3	4	Total
**Giants**	7	17	7	14	**45**
Redskins	0	7	7	0	**14**

at FedExField, Landover, Maryland

- Date: September 25
- Game time: 8:25 p.m. EDT
- Game weather: 64 °F (18 °C), cloudy
- Game attendance: 80,573
- Referee: Carl Cheffers
- TV announcers (CBS/NFLN): Jim Nantz, Phil Simms and Tracy Wolfson
- Recap, Gamebook

Game information

**First quarter**

- NYG – Larry Donnell 5-yard pass from Eli Manning (Josh Brown kick), 7:35. Giants 7–0. **Drive: 6 plays, 24 yards, 3:07.**

**Second quarter**

- NYG – Larry Donnell 6-yard pass from Eli Manning (Josh Brown kick), 14:14. Giants 14–0. **Drive: 6 plays, 75 yards, 2:45.**
- WSH – Andre Roberts 18-yard pass from Kirk Cousins (Kai Forbath kick), 8:50. Giants 14–7. **Drive: 10 plays, 80 yards, 5:24.**
- NYG – Larry Donnell 6-yard pass from Eli Manning (Josh Brown kick), 2:16. Giants 21–7. **Drive: 12 plays, 67 yards, 6:34.**
- NYG – Josh Brown 29-yard field goal, 0:00. Giants 24–7. **Drive: 8 plays, 71 yards, 1:16.**

**Third quarter**

- WSH – Alfred Morris 20-yard run (Kai Forbath kick), 12:57. Giants 24–14. **Drive: 5 plays, 83 yards, 2:03.**
- NYG – Darren Fells 2-yard pass from Eli Manning (Josh Brown kick), 4:19. Giants 31–14. **Drive: 4 plays, 35 yards, 1:19.**

**Fourth quarter**

- NYG – Eli Manning 1-yard run (Josh Brown kick), 14:07. Giants 38–14. **Drive: 5 plays, 22 yards, 1:22.**
- NYG – Andre Williams 1-yard run (Josh Brown kick), 6:05. Giants 45–14. **Drive: 9 plays, 46 yards, 5:25.**

**Top passers**

- NYG – Eli Manning – 28/39, 300 yards, 4 TD, INT
- WAS – Kirk Cousins – 19/33, 257 yards, TD, 4 INT

**Top rushers**

- NYG – Andre Williams – 15 rushes, 66 yards, TD
- WAS – Alfred Morris – 12 rushes, 63 yards, TD

**Top receivers**

- NYG – Victor Cruz – 6 receptions, 108 yards
- WAS – Roy Helu - 5 receptions, 78 yards

This would be the Giants largest margin of victory since their 42-7 win over the Eagles in 2012. It was also head coach Tom Coughlin's 100th win as coach of the Giants.

==== Week 5: vs. Atlanta Falcons ====
Week Five: Atlanta Falcons at New York Giants – Game summary

Quarter	1	2	3	4	Total
Falcons	7	6	7	0	**20**
**Giants**	7	3	7	13	**30**

at MetLife Stadium, East Rutherford, New Jersey

- Date: October 5
- Game time: 1:00 p.m. EDT
- Game weather: 55 °F (13 °C), sunny
- Game attendance: 80,307
- Referee: Ed Hochuli
- TV announcers (Fox): Kevin Burkhardt, John Lynch and Pam Oliver
- Recap, Gamebook

Game information

**First quarter**

- NYG – Rueben Randle 3-yard pass from Eli Manning (Josh Brown kick), 6:40. Giants 7–0. **Drive: 11 plays, 83 yards, 5:06.**
- ATL – Steven Jackson 10-yard run (Matt Bryant kick), 1:57. Tied 7–7. **Drive: 9 plays, 80 yards, 4:43.**

**Second quarter**

- ATL – Matt Bryant 20-yard field goal, 14:15. Falcons 10–7. **Drive: 6 plays, 18 yards, 2:33.**
- NYG – Josh Brown 49-yard field goal, 3:40. Tied 10–10. **Drive: 9 plays, 50 yards, 5:13.**
- ATL – Matt Bryant 20-yard field goal, 0:03. Falcons 13–10. **Drive: 11 plays, 73 yards, 3:37.**

**Third quarter**

- ATL – Antone Smith 74-yard pass from Matt Ryan (Matt Bryant kick), 5:37. Falcons 20–10. **Drive: 3 plays, 80 yards, 1:20.**
- NYG – Andre Williams 3-yard run (Josh Brown kick), 2:05. Falcons 20–17. **Drive: 9 plays, 81 yards, 3:32.**

**Fourth quarter**

- NYG – Odell Beckham Jr. 3-yard pass from Eli Manning (Josh Brown kick), 10:02. Giants 24–20. **Drive: 11 plays, 64 yards, 5:22.**
- NYG – Josh Brown 50-yard field goal, 5:01. Giants 27–20. **Drive: 7 plays, 24 yards, 3:22.**
- NYG – Josh Brown 26-yard field goal, 2:08. Giants 30–20. **Drive: 7 plays, 10 yards, 2:26.**

**Top passers**

- ATL – Matt Ryan – 29/45, 316 yards, TD, INT
- NYG – Eli Manning – 19/30, 200 yards, 2 TD

**Top rushers**

- ATL – Devonta Freeman – 4 rushes, 38 yards
- NYG – Andre Williams – 20 rushes, 65 yards, TD

**Top receivers**

- ATL – Julio Jones – 11 receptions, 105 yards
- NYG – Preston Parker – 3 receptions, 61 yards

Rookie Odell Beckham Jr. would record his 1st NFL touchdown in this game.

==== Week 6: at Philadelphia Eagles ====
Week Six: New York Giants at Philadelphia Eagles – Game summary

Quarter	1	2	3	4	Total
Giants	0	0	0	0	**0**
**Eagles**	10	10	7	0	**27**

at Lincoln Financial Field, Philadelphia, Pennsylvania

- Date: October 12
- Game time: 8:30 p.m. EDT
- Game weather: 57 °F (14 °C), partly cloudy
- Game attendance: 69,596
- Referee: Clete Blakeman
- TV announcers (NBC): Al Michaels, Cris Collinsworth and Michele Tafoya
- Recap, Gamebook

Game information

**First quarter**

- PHI – Cody Parkey 31-yard field goal, 10:55. Eagles 3–0. **Drive: 10 plays, 67 yards, 4:05.**
- PHI – Zach Ertz 15-yard pass from Nick Foles (Cody Parkey kick), 3:56. Eagles 10–0. **Drive: 10 plays, 81 yards, 4:35.**

**Second quarter**

- PHI – James Casey 26-yard pass from Nick Foles (Cody Parkey kick), 9:10. Eagles 17–0. **Drive: 3 plays, 47 yards, 0:57.**
- PHI – Cody Parkey 45-yard field goal, 4:25. Eagles 20–0. **Drive: 6 plays, 16 yards, 2:13.**

**Third quarter**

- PHI – Darren Sproles 15-yard run (Cody Parkey kick), 5:26. Eagles 27–0. **Drive: 8 plays, 97 yards, 4:09.**

**Fourth quarter**

- No scoring plays.

**Top passers**

- NYG – Eli Manning – 13/23, 151 yards
- PHI – Nick Foles – 21/34, 248 yards, 2 TD, 2 INT

**Top rushers**

- NYG – Andre Williams – 17 rushes, 59 yards
- PHI – LeSean McCoy – 22 rushes, 149 yards

**Top receivers**

- NYG – Rueben Randle – 9 receptions, 58 yards
- PHI – Riley Cooper – 5 receptions, 59 yards

The Giants were dominated from start to finish as the Eagles routed them 27–0. It was only the second time this season that an NFL team failed to score in a game (the Jets were shut out 31–0 in Week 5 against the Chargers). The loss (their fourth shutout loss in last three seasons) snapped the Giants' 3 game winning streak as their overall record fell to 3–3.

==== Week 7: at Dallas Cowboys ====
Week Seven: New York Giants at Dallas Cowboys – Game summary

Quarter	1	2	3	4	Total
Giants	0	14	0	7	**21**
**Cowboys**	7	7	7	10	**31**

at AT&T Stadium, Arlington, Texas

- Date: October 19
- Game time: 4:25 p.m. EDT/3:25 p.m. CDT
- Game weather: Played indoors (retractable roof closed)
- Game attendance: 91,028
- Referee: Jerome Boger
- TV announcers (Fox): Thom Brennaman, Troy Aikman and Charissa Thompson
- Recap, Gamebook

Game information

**First quarter**

- DAL – Gavin Escobar 15-yard pass from Tony Romo (Dan Bailey kick), 5:06. Cowboys 7–0. **Drive: 11 plays, 76 yards, 5:59.**

**Second quarter**

- NYG – Odell Beckham Jr. 9-yard pass from Eli Manning (Josh Brown kick), 11:24. Tied 7–7. **Drive: 10 plays, 71 yards, 4:28.**
- NYG – Daniel Fells 27-yard pass from Eli Manning (Josh Brown kick), 7:53. Giants 14–7. **Drive: 1 play, 27 yards, 0:07.**
- DAL – Terrance Williams 18-yard pass from Tony Romo (Dan Bailey kick), 2:17. Tied 14–14. **Drive: 10 plays, 80 yards, 5:36.**

**Third quarter**

- DAL – Gavin Escobar 28-yard pass from Tony Romo (Dan Bailey kick), 6:15. Cowboys 21–14. **Drive: 6 plays, 93 yards, 3:18.**

**Fourth quarter**

- DAL – DeMarco Murray 1-yard run (Dan Bailey kick), 9:11. Cowboys 28–14. **Drive: 4 plays, 27 yards, 1:59.**
- NYG – Odell Beckham Jr. 5-yard pass from Eli Manning (Josh Brown kick), 5:28. Cowboys 28–21. **Drive: 11 plays, 80 yards, 3:43.**
- DAL – Dan Bailey 49-yard field goal, 0:59. Cowboys 31–21. **Drive: 10 plays, 49 yards, 4:29.**

**Top passers**

- NYG – Eli Manning – 21/33, 248 yards, 3 TD
- DAL – Tony Romo – 17/23, 279 yards, 3 TD, INT

**Top rushers**

- NYG – Andre Williams – 18 rushes, 51 yards
- DAL – DeMarco Murray – 28 rushes, 128 yards, TD

**Top receivers**

- NYG – Larry Donnell – 7 receptions, 90 yards
- DAL – Dez Bryant – 9 receptions, 151 yards

Larry Donnell lost 2 fumbles in the fourth quarter, and the defense wasn't able to stop Tony Romo and the Cowboys offense who scored on three of their first four possessions in the second half.

==== Week 9: vs. Indianapolis Colts ====
Week Nine: Indianapolis Colts at New York Giants – Game summary

Quarter	1	2	3	4	Total
**Colts**	3	13	21	3	**40**
Giants	0	3	7	14	**24**

at MetLife Stadium, East Rutherford, New Jersey

- Date: November 3
- Game time: 8:30 p.m. EST
- Game weather: 55 °F (13 °C), mostly clear
- Game attendance: 77,975
- Referee: Carl Cheffers
- TV announcers (ESPN): Mike Tirico, Jon Gruden and Lisa Salters
- Recap, Gamebook

Game information

**First quarter**

- IND – Adam Vinatieri 48-yard field goal, 7:07. Colts 3–0. **Drive: 11 plays, 58 yards, 5:35.**

**Second quarter**

- IND – Coby Fleener 32-yard pass from Andrew Luck (Adam Vinatieri kick), 13:38. Colts 10–0. **Drive: 2 plays, 68 yards, 1:04.**
- NYG – Josh Brown 38-yard field goal, 7:07. Colts 10–3. **Drive: 11 plays, 45 yards, 3:38.**
- IND – Adam Vinatieri 31-yard field goal, 3:32. Colts 13–3. **Drive: 9 plays, 61 yards, 3:35.**
- IND – Adam Vinatieri 48-yard field goal, 1:07. Colts 16–3. **Drive: 6 plays, 30 yards, 0:53.**

**Third quarter**

- IND – T.Y. Hilton 31-yard pass from Andrew Luck (Adam Vinatieri kick), 11:50. Colts 23–3. **Drive: 8 plays, 84 yards, 3:10.**
- NYG – Andre Williams 1-yard run (Josh Brown kick), 9:48. Colts 23–10. **Drive: 5 plays, 84 yards, 2:02.**
- IND – Reggie Wayne 40-yard pass from Andrew Luck (Adam Vinatieri kick), 6:09. Colts 30–10. **Drive: 8 plays, 80 yards, 3:39.**
- IND – Dwayne Allen 2-yard pass from Andrew Luck (Adam Vinatieri kick), 4:31. Colts 37–10. **Drive: 2 plays, 4 yards, 0:49.**

**Fourth quarter**

- IND – Adam Vinatieri 43-yard field goal, 13:23. Colts 40–10. **Drive: 8 plays, 45 yards, 4:34.**
- NYG – Larry Donnell 5-yard pass from Eli Manning (Josh Brown kick), 8:55. Colts 40–17. **Drive: 11 plays, 80 yards, 4:28.**
- NYG – Corey Washington 1-yard pass from Eli Manning (Josh Brown kick), 3:19. Colts 40–24. **Drive: 11 plays, 90 yards, 2:52.**

**Top passers**

- IND – Andrew Luck – 25/46, 354 yards, 4 TD
- NYG – Eli Manning – 27/52, 339 yards, 2 TD

**Top rushers**

- IND – Ahmad Bradshaw – 7 rushes, 50 yards
- NYG – Michael Cox – 2 rushes, 27 yards

**Top receivers**

- IND – Coby Fleener – 4 receptions, 77 yards, TD
- NYG – Odell Beckham Jr. – 8 receptions, 156 yards

On the night the Giants added Michael Strahan to the Ring of Honor, they got blown out by the Colts. They fell to 3-5 and lost their third game in a row.

==== Week 10: at Seattle Seahawks ====
Week Ten: New York Giants at Seattle Seahawks – Game summary

Quarter	1	2	3	4	Total
Giants	7	10	0	0	**17**
**Seahawks**	7	7	3	21	**38**

at CenturyLink Field, Seattle, Washington

- Date: November 9
- Game time: 4:25 p.m. EST/1:25 p.m. PST
- Game weather: 50 °F (10 °C), cloudy
- Game attendance: 68,352
- Referee: Pete Morelli
- TV announcers (Fox): Joe Buck, Troy Aikman and Erin Andrews
- Recap, Gamebook

Game information

**First quarter**

- SEA – Marshawn Lynch 1-yard run (Stephen Hauschka kick), 10:23. Seahawks 7–0. **Drive: 6 plays, 80 yards, 3:19.**
- NYG – Preston Parker 6-yard pass from Eli Manning (Josh Brown kick), 4:32. Tied 7–7. **Drive: 5 plays, 24 yards, 1:37.**

**Second quarter**

- NYG – Andre Williams 3-yard run (Josh Brown kick), 13:38. Giants 14–7. **Drive: 5 plays, 80 yards, 2:23.**
- SEA – Marshawn Lynch 2-yard run (Stephen Hauschka kick), 1:57. Tied 14–14. **Drive: 15 plays, 85 yards, 8:25.**
- NYG – Josh Brown 41-yard field goal, 0:00. Giants 17–14. **Drive: 11 plays, 57 yards, 1:57.**

**Third quarter**

- SEA – Stephen Hauschka 28-yard field goal, 4:13. Tied 17–17. **Drive: 8 plays, 70 yards, 3:55.**

**Fourth quarter**

- SEA – Marshawn Lynch 3-yard run (Stephen Hauschka kick), 12:47. Seahawks 24–17. **Drive: 7 plays, 58 yards, 2:52.**
- SEA – Marshawn Lynch 16-yard run (Stephen Hauschka kick), 7:47. Seahawks 31–17. **Drive: 7 plays, 53 yards, 3:28.**
- SEA – Russell Wilson 1-yard run (Stephen Hauschka kick), 5:19. Seahawks 38–17. **Drive: 2 plays, 46 yards, 0:27.**

**Top passers**

- NYG – Eli Manning – 29/44, 283 yards, TD, INT
- SEA – Russell Wilson – 10/17, 172 yards, 2 INT

**Top rushers**

- NYG – Andre Williams – 13 rushes, 33 yards, TD
- SEA – Marshawn Lynch – 21 rushes, 140 yards, 4 TD

**Top receivers**

- NYG – Odell Beckham Jr. – 7 receptions, 108 yards
- SEA – Jermaine Kearse – 3 receptions, 70 yards

The Seahawks outscored the Giants 21-0 in the fourth quarter. The 3-6 Giants playoff hopes were now in jeopardy.

==== Week 11: vs. San Francisco 49ers ====
Week Eleven: San Francisco 49ers at New York Giants – Game summary

Quarter	1	2	3	4	Total
**49ers**	3	6	7	0	**16**
Giants	7	0	3	0	**10**

at MetLife Stadium, East Rutherford, New Jersey

- Date: November 16
- Game time: 1:00 p.m. EST
- Game weather: 42 °F (6 °C), cloudy
- Game attendance: 80,352
- Referee: Gene Steratore
- TV announcers (Fox): Kevin Burkhardt, John Lynch and Pam Oliver
- Recap, Gamebook

Game information

**First quarter**

- NYG – Larry Donnell 19-yard pass from Eli Manning (Josh Brown kick), 6:54. Giants 7–0. **Drive: 5 plays, 63 yards, 2:10.**
- SF – Phil Dawson 31-yard field goal, 0:59. Giants 7–3. **Drive: 11 plays, 67 yards, 5:55.**

**Second quarter**

- SF – Phil Dawson 37-yard field goal, 10:15. Giants 7–6. **Drive: 10 plays, 42 yards, 4:45.**
- SF – Phil Dawson 44-yard field goal, 7:29. 49ers 9–7. **Drive: 4 plays, 3 yards, 0:54.**

**Third quarter**

- SF – Michael Crabtree 48-yard pass from Colin Kaepernick (Phil Dawson kick), 11:38. 49ers 16–7. **Drive: 3 plays, 59 yards, 1:01.**
- NYG – Josh Brown 43-yard field goal, 8:18. 49ers 16–10. **Drive: 8 plays, 34 yards, 3:20.**

**Fourth quarter**

- No scoring plays.

**Top passers**

- SF – Colin Kaepernick – 15/29, 193 yards, TD
- NYG – Eli Manning – 22/45, 280 yards, TD, 5 INT

**Top rushers**

- SF – Frank Gore – 19 rushes, 95 yards
- NYG – Rashad Jennings – 18 rushes, 59 yards

**Top receivers**

- SF – Michael Crabtree – 3 receptions, 85 yards, TD
- NYG – Rueben Randle – 7 receptions, 112 yards

The Giants had many opportunities to win this game handily, but couldn't move past Eli Manning's career-worst 5 interceptions.

==== Week 12: vs. Dallas Cowboys ====
Week Twelve: Dallas Cowboys at New York Giants – Game summary

Quarter	1	2	3	4	Total
**Cowboys**	3	7	14	7	**31**
Giants	7	14	0	7	**28**

at MetLife Stadium, East Rutherford, New Jersey

- Date: November 23
- Game time: 8:30 p.m. EST
- Game weather: 51 °F (11 °C), cloudy
- Game attendance: 80,520
- Referee: Bill Vinovich
- TV announcers (NBC): Al Michaels, Cris Collinsworth and Michele Tafoya
- Recap, Gamebook

Game information

**First quarter**

- NYG – Odell Beckham Jr. 3-yard pass from Eli Manning (Josh Brown kick), 7:01. Giants 7–0. **Drive: 13 plays, 80 yards, 7:07.**
- DAL – Dan Bailey 38-yard field goal, 2:45. Giants 7–3. **Drive: 8 plays, 60 yards, 4:16.**

**Second quarter**

- NYG – Odell Beckham Jr. 43-yard pass from Eli Manning (Josh Brown kick), 14:52. Giants 14–3. **Drive: 6 plays, 66 yards, 2:53.**
- DAL – Jason Witten 4-yard pass from Tony Romo (Dan Bailey kick), 9:15. Giants 14–10. **Drive: 9 plays, 77 yards, 5:30.**
- NYG – Andre Williams 3-yard run (Josh Brown kick), 3:18. Giants 21–10. **Drive: 11 plays, 80 yards, 5:57.**

**Third quarter**

- DAL – Cole Beasley 45-yard pass from Tony Romo (Dan Bailey kick), 6:35. Giants 21–17. **Drive: 4 plays, 65 yards, 1:59.**
- DAL – Dez Bryant 31-yard pass from Tony Romo (Dan Bailey kick), 1:08. Cowboys 24–21. **Drive: 4 plays, 52 yards, 1:55.**

**Fourth quarter**

- NYG – Adrien Robinson 1 yard pass from Eli Manning (Josh Brown kick), 3:00. Giants 28–24. **Drive: 14 plays, 93 yards, 6:12.**
- DAL – Dez Bryant 31 yard pass from Tony Romo (Dan Bailey kick), 1:01. Cowboys 31–28. **Drive: 7 plays, 80 yards, 1:59.**

**Top passers**

- DAL – Tony Romo – 18/26, 279 yards, 4 TD
- NYG – Eli Manning – 29/40, 338 yards, 3 TD, INT

**Top rushers**

- DAL – DeMarco Murray – 24 rushes, 121 yards
- NYG – Rashad Jennings – 19 rushes, 52 yards

**Top receivers**

- DAL – Dez Bryant – 7 receptions, 86 yards, 2 TD
- NYG – Odell Beckham Jr. – 10 receptions, 146 yards, 2 TD

This was the first Sunday Night Football game held in MetLife Stadium following a one-season absence.

With the loss, the Giants fell to 3-8, and were mathematically eliminated from playoff contention after the Lions defeated the Bears on Thanksgiving four days later. This game, however, is best known for an acrobatic one-handed catch by Odell Beckham Jr. early in the second quarter that is widely regarded as one of the greatest catches in NFL history. A penalty marker flew as he made the catch for pass interference on Brandon Carr, who had been covering Beckham on that play. The catch was also the Giants' 3,000th touchdown in franchise history, including postseason play.

==== Week 13: at Jacksonville Jaguars ====
Week Thirteen: New York Giants at Jacksonville Jaguars – Game summary

Quarter	1	2	3	4	Total
Giants	0	21	0	3	**24**
**Jaguars**	0	3	13	9	**25**

at EverBank Field, Jacksonville, Florida

- Date: November 30
- Game time: 1:00 p.m. EST
- Game weather: 71 °F (22 °C), 0% chance of rain
- Game attendance: 64,687
- Referee: Craig Wrolstad
- TV announcers (Fox): Justin Kutcher, David Diehl and Laura Okmin
- Recap, Gamebook

Game information

**First quarter**

- No scoring plays.

**Second quarter**

- NYG - Rashad Jennings 2-yard run (Josh Brown kick), 14:57. Giants 7–0. **Drive: 19 plays, 91 yards, 9:51.**
- NYG - Preston Parker 3-yard pass from Eli Manning (Josh Brown kick), 11:27. Giants 14–0. **Drive: 6 plays, 54 yards, 3:01.**
- NYG - Rashad Jennings 17-yard run (Josh Brown kick), 6:30. Giants 21–0. **Drive: 7 plays, 63 yards, 3:29.**
- JAX - Josh Scobee 28-yard field goal, 2:03. Giants 21–3. **Drive: 12 plays, 70 yards, 4:27.**

**Third quarter**

- JAX - J.T. Thomas fumble recovery in endzone (Josh Scobee kick), 11:13. Giants 21–10.
- JAX - Marqise Lee 30-yard pass from Blake Bortles (pass failed), 1:55. Giants 21–16. **Drive: 6 plays, 67 yards, 2:55.**

**Fourth quarter**

- JAX - Aaron Colvin 41-yard fumble return (pass failed), 12:56. Jaguars 22–21.
- NYG - Josh Brown 33-yard field goal, 3:26. Giants 24–22. **Drive: 8 plays, 54 yards, 2:36.**
- JAX - Josh Scobee 43-yard field goal, 0:28. Jaguars 25–24. **Drive: 11 plays, 55 yards, 2:58.**

**Top passers**

- NYG – Eli Manning – 24/34, 247 yards, TD
- JAX – Blake Bortles – 21/35, 194 yards, TD

**Top rushers**

- NYG – Rashad Jennings – 26 rushes, 91 yards, 2 TD
- JAX – Blake Bortles – 5 rushes, 68 yards

**Top receivers**

- NYG – Odell Beckham Jr. – 7 receptions, 90 yards
- JAX – Marqise Lee – 6 receptions, 75 yards, TD

The Giants squandered a 21–0 lead they had midway through the second quarter and went on to lose 25-24 to fall to 3-9, matching their loss total from 2013.

==== Week 14: at Tennessee Titans ====
Week Fourteen: New York Giants at Tennessee Titans – Game summary

Quarter	1	2	3	4	Total
**Giants**	17	6	10	3	**36**
Titans	0	0	7	0	**7**

at LP Field, Nashville, Tennessee

- Date: December 7
- Game time: 1:00 p.m. EST/12:00 p.m. CST
- Game weather: 45 °F (7 °C), cloudy
- Game attendance: 69,143
- Referee: Walt Anderson
- TV announcers (Fox): Thom Brennaman, David Diehl and Laura Okmin
- Recap, Gamebook

Game information

**First quarter**

- NYG – Josh Brown 20-yard field goal, 7:59. Giants 3–0. **Drive: 14 plays, 78 yards, 7:01.**
- NYG – Odell Beckham Jr. 15-yard pass from Eli Manning (Josh Brown kick), 4:41. Giants 10–0. **Drive: 4 plays, 72 yards, 1:30.**
- NYG – Markus Kuhn 26-yard fumble return (Josh Brown kick), 1:07. Giants 17–0.

**Second quarter**

- NYG – Josh Brown 19-yard field goal, 1:38. Giants 20–0. **Drive: 16 plays, 67 yards, 7:08.**
- NYG – Josh Brown 36-yard field goal, 0:07. Giants 23–0. **Drive: 8 plays, 45 yards, 1:03.**

**Third quarter**

- NYG – Andre Williams 50-yard run (Josh Brown kick), 12:06. Giants 30–0. **Drive: 3 plays, 59 yards, 1:21.**
- TEN – Marqueston Huff 23-yard interception return (Ryan Succop kick), 8:36. Giants 30–7.
- NYG – Josh Brown 33-yard field goal, 0:33. Giants 33–7. **Drive: 8 plays, 30 yards, 4:11.**

**Fourth quarter**

- NYG – Josh Brown 42-yard field goal, 11:22. Giants 36–7. **Drive: 7 plays, 11 yards, 2:49.**

**Top passers**

- NYG – Eli Manning – 26/42, 260 yards, TD, INT
- TEN – Zach Mettenberger – 14/24, 125 yards, INT

**Top rushers**

- NYG – Andre Williams – 24 rushes, 131 yards, TD
- TEN – Jake Locker – 2 rushes, 28 yards

**Top receivers**

- NYG – Odell Beckham Jr. – 11 receptions, 130 yards, TD
- TEN – Derek Hagan – 6 receptions, 62 yards

With the blowout victory over a woeful Titans team, the Giants improved to 4-9 and snapped a 7-game losing streak. The Giants beat the Titans for the first time since they moved to Tennessee.

==== Week 15: vs. Washington Redskins ====
Week Fifteen: Washington Redskins at New York Giants – Game summary

Quarter	1	2	3	4	Total
Redskins	3	7	3	0	**13**
**Giants**	7	0	10	7	**24**

at MetLife Stadium, East Rutherford, New Jersey

- Date: December 14
- Game time: 1:00 p.m. EST
- Game weather: 43 °F (6 °C), cloudy
- Game attendance: 77,628
- Referee: Jeff Triplette
- TV announcers (Fox): Kenny Albert, Daryl Johnston and Tony Siragusa
- Recap, Gamebook

Game information

**First quarter**

- WAS – Kai Forbath 35-yard field goal, 6:47. Redskins 3–0. **Drive: 13 plays, 79 yards, 6:11.**
- NYG – Odell Beckham Jr. 10-yard pass from Eli Manning (Josh Brown kick), 1:40. Giants 7–3. **Drive: 12 plays, 56 yards, 5:07.**

**Second quarter**

- WAS – Chris Thompson 9-yard pass from Robert Griffin III (Kai Forbath kick), 8:19. Redskins 10–7. **Drive: 7 plays, 77 yards, 4:07.**

**Third quarter**

- NYG – John Brown 32-yard field goal, 13:18. Tied 10–10. **Drive: 4 plays, 3 yards, 1:42.**
- WAS – Kai Forbath 38-yard field goal, 3:27. Redskins 13–10. **Drive: 8 plays, 73 yards, 4:07.**
- NYG – Odell Beckham Jr. 35-yard pass from Eli Manning (John Brown kick), 1:22. Giants 17–13. **Drive: 4 plays, 81 yards, 2:05.**

**Fourth quarter**

- NYG – Odell Beckham Jr. 6-yard pass from Eli Manning (John Brown kick), 4:41. Giants 24–13. **Drive: 12 plays, 76 yards, 5:19.**

**Top passers**

- WAS – Robert Griffin III – 18/27, 236 yards, TD
- NYG – Eli Manning – 23/34, 250 yards, 3 TD

**Top rushers**

- WAS – Alfred Morris – 14 rushes, 49 yards
- NYG – Andre Williams – 18 rushes, 46 yards

**Top receivers**

- WAS – Andre Roberts – 2 receptions, 81 yards
- NYG – Odell Beckham Jr. – 12 receptions, 143 yards, 3 TD

Odell Beckham Jr. scored 3 touchdowns in the win. The Giants improved to 5-9, and swept the Redskins for the second year in a row.

==== Week 16: at St. Louis Rams ====
Week Sixteen: New York Giants at St. Louis Rams – Game summary

Quarter	1	2	3	4	Total
**Giants**	10	10	14	3	**37**
Rams	3	10	7	7	**27**

at Edward Jones Dome, St. Louis, Missouri

- Date: December 21
- Game time: 4:05 p.m EST/3:05 p.m. CST
- Game weather: Played indoors (dome stadium)
- Game attendance: 55,851
- Referee: Pete Morelli
- TV announcers (Fox): Thom Brennaman, David Diehl and Laura Okmin
- Recap, Gamebook

Game information

**First quarter**

- NYG – Josh Brown 29-yard field goal, 10:41. Giants 3–0. **Drive: 8 plays, 69 yards, 4:19.**
- NYG – Odell Beckham Jr. 8-yard pass from Eli Manning (Josh Brown kick), 8:24. Giants 10–0. **Drive: 5 plays, 21 yards, 2:10.**
- STL – Greg Zuerlein 51-yard field goal, 4:52. Giants 10–3. **Drive: 6 plays, 15 yards, 3:32.**

**Second quarter**

- NYG – Josh Brown 37-yard field goal, 12:39. Giants 13–3. **Drive: 7 plays, 37 yards, 3:15.**
- NYG – Orleans Darkwa 12-yard run (Josh Brown kick), 4:49. Giants 20–3. **Drive: 10 plays, 80 yards, 5:38.**
- STL – Tre Mason 10-yard run (Greg Zuerlein kick), 2:18. Giants 20–10. **Drive: 5 plays, 74 yards, 2:31.**
- STL – Greg Zuerlein 20-yard field goal, 0:00. Giants 20–13. **Drive: 9 plays, 58 yards, 1:36.**

**Third quarter**

- NYG – Rueben Randle 7-yard pass from Eli Manning (Josh Brown kick), 7:29. Giants 27–13. **Drive: 7 plays, 87 yards, 3:58.**
- STL – Lance Kendricks 23-yard pass from Shaun Hill (Josh Brown kick), 1:44. Giants 27–20. **Drive: 10 plays, 90 yards, 5:45.**
- NYG – Odell Beckham Jr. 80-yard pass from Eli Manning (Josh Brown kick), 0:45. Giants 34–20. **Drive: 3 plays, 80 yards, 0:59.**

**Fourth quarter**

- NYG – Josh Brown 52-yard field goal, 8:29. Giants 37–20. **Drive: 10 plays, 56 yards, 5:01.**
- STL – Chris Givens 47-yard pass from Shaun Hill (Greg Zuerlein kick), 3:56. Giants 37–27. **Drive: 3 plays, 66 yards, 1:18.**

**Top passers**

- NYG – Eli Manning – 25/32, 391 yards, 3 TD
- STL – Shaun Hill – 24/32, 290 yards, 2 TD, INT

**Top rushers**

- NYG – Andre Williams – 26 rushes, 110 yards
- STL – Tre Mason – 13 rushes, 76 yards, TD

**Top receivers**

- NYG – Odell Beckham Jr. – 8 receptions, 148 yards, 2 TD
- STL – Kenny Britt – 9 receptions, 103 yards

In this game, Odell Beckham Jr. broke Giants' franchise records for most receptions by a rookie and most receiving yards by a rookie, previously set by Jeremy Shockey in 2002. Beckham also topped 1,000 yards receiving for the season. In both cases, this was achieved despite Beckham missing the first four games of the season. This game was also infamous for a bench-clearing brawl in the second quarter.

Because the Rams moved to Los Angeles in 2016, this is the last time the Giants played in St. Louis.

==== Week 17: vs. Philadelphia Eagles ====
Week Seventeen: Philadelphia Eagles at New York Giants – Game summary

Quarter	1	2	3	4	Total
**Eagles**	14	3	7	10	**34**
Giants	10	6	3	7	**26**

at MetLife Stadium, East Rutherford, New Jersey

- Date: December 28
- Game time: 1:00 p.m. EST
- Game weather: 48 °F (9 °C), cloudy
- Game attendance: 79,150
- Referee: Walt Coleman
- TV announcers (Fox): Kenny Albert, Daryl Johnston and Tony Siragusa
- Recap, Gamebook

Game information

**First quarter**

- NYG – Andre Williams 1-yard run (Josh Brown kick), 12:11. Giants 7–0. **Drive: 6 plays, 80 yards, 2:49.**
- PHI – Jordan Matthews 44-yard pass from Mark Sanchez (Cody Parkey kick), 11:00. Tied 7–7. **Drive: 3 plays, 80 yards, 1:11.**
- PHI – Brent Celek 1-yard pass from Mark Sanchez (Cody Parkey kick), 6:12. Eagles 14–7. **Drive: 7 plays, 75 yards, 2:26.**
- NYG – Josh Brown 38-yard field goal, 2:11. Eagles 14–10. **Drive: 10 plays, 60 yards, 4:01.**

**Second quarter**

- NYG – Josh Brown 20-yard field goal, 7:26. Eagles 14–13. **Drive: 10 plays, 47 yards, 4:20.**
- NYG – Josh Brown 36-yard field goal, 2:02. Giants 16–14. **Drive: 10 plays, 71 yards, 3:27.**
- PHI – Cody Parkey 32-yard field goal, 0:00. Eagles 17–16. **Drive: 11 plays, 66 yards, 2:02.**

**Third quarter**

- PHI – Trey Burton 27-yard return of blocked punt (Cody Parkey kick), 12:21. Eagles 24–16.
- NYG – Josh Brown 53-yard field goal, 4:24. Eagles 24–19. **Drive: 8 plays, 46 yards, 2:52.**

**Fourth quarter**

- PHI – Chris Polk 1-yard run (Cody Parkey kick), 13:08. Eagles 31–19. **Drive: 8 plays, 65 yards, 1:59.**
- NYG – Odell Beckham Jr. 63-yard pass from Eli Manning (Josh Brown kick), 11:47. Eagles 31–26. **Drive: 5 plays, 80 yards, 1:21.**
- PHI – Cody Parkey 39-yard field goal, 7:56. Eagles 34–26. **Drive: 10 plays, 53 yards, 3:51.**

**Top passers**

- PHI – Mark Sanchez – 23/36, 292 yards, TD, INT
- NYG – Eli Manning – 28/53, 429 yards, TD, INT

**Top rushers**

- PHI – LeSean McCoy – 17 rushes, 99 yards
- NYG – Andre Williams – 15 rushes, 43 yards, TD

**Top receivers**

- PHI – Jordan Matthews – 8 receptions, 105 yards, TD
- NYG – Odell Beckham Jr. – 12 receptions, 185 yards, TD

With the loss, the Giants finished the season 6-10 and were swept by the Eagles for the first time since 2010. Also, their record against the Eagles fell to 3-11 dating back to 2008.

== Standings ==
=== Division ===
NFC East
	W	L	T	PCT	DIV	CONF	PF	PA	STK
^{(3)} Dallas Cowboys	12	4	0	.750	4–2	8–4	467	352	W4
Philadelphia Eagles	10	6	0	.625	4–2	6–6	474	400	W1
New York Giants	6	10	0	.375	2–4	4–8	380	400	L1
Washington Redskins	4	12	0	.250	2–4	2–10	301	438	L1

=== Conference ===
NFC
#	Team	Division	W	L	T	PCT	DIV	CONF	SOS	SOV	STK
Division leaders
1 (Note: Seattle, Green Bay and Dallas were ranked in seeds 1–3 based on conference record.)	Seattle Seahawks	West	12	4	0	.750	5–1	10–2	.525	.513	W6
2	Green Bay Packers	North	12	4	0	.750	5–1	9–3	.482	.440	W2
3	Dallas Cowboys	East	12	4	0	.750	4–2	8–4	.445	.422	W4
4	Carolina Panthers	South	7	8	1	.469	4–2	6–6	.490	.357	W4
Wild Cards
5 (Note: Arizona defeated Detroit head-to-head (Week 11, 14–6).)	Arizona Cardinals	West	11	5	0	.688	3–3	8–4	.523	.477	L2
6	Detroit Lions	North	11	5	0	.688	5–1	9–3	.471	.392	L1
Did not qualify for the postseason
7	Philadelphia Eagles	East	10	6	0	.625	4–2	6–6	.490	.416	W1
8	San Francisco 49ers	West	8	8	0	.500	2–4	7–5	.527	.508	W1
9 (Note: New Orleans defeated Minnesota head-to-head (Week 3, 20–9).)	New Orleans Saints	South	7	9	0	.438	3–3	6–6	.486	.415	W1
10	Minnesota Vikings	North	7	9	0	.438	1–5	6–6	.475	.308	W1
11 (Note: The NY Giants defeated both Atlanta and St. Louis head-to-head (Atlanta: Week 5, 30–20; St. Louis: Week 16, 37–27), while Atlanta finished ahead of St. Louis based on conference record.)	New York Giants	East	6	10	0	.375	2–4	4–8	.512	.323	L1
12	Atlanta Falcons	South	6	10	0	.375	5–1	6–6	.482	.380	L1
13	St. Louis Rams	West	6	10	0	.375	2–4	4–8	.531	.427	L3
14	Chicago Bears	North	5	11	0	.313	1–5	4–8	.529	.338	L5
15	Washington Redskins	East	4	12	0	.250	2–4	2–10	.496	.422	L1
16	Tampa Bay Buccaneers	South	2	14	0	.125	0–6	1–11	.486	.469	L6
Tiebreakers (Note: When breaking ties for three or more teams under the NFL's rules, they are first broken within divisions, then comparing only the highest-ranked remaining team from each division.)
