= 2014 Washington Redskins season =

NFL team season

- Owner: Daniel Snyder
- General manager: Bruce Allen (de facto)
- President: Bruce Allen
- Head coach: Jay Gruden
- Offensive coordinator: Sean McVay
- Defensive coordinator: Jim Haslett
- Home stadium: FedExField

Results
- Record: 4–12
- Division place: 4th NFC East
- Playoffs: Did not qualify
- Pro Bowlers: RB Alfred Morris; T Trent Williams

Uniform
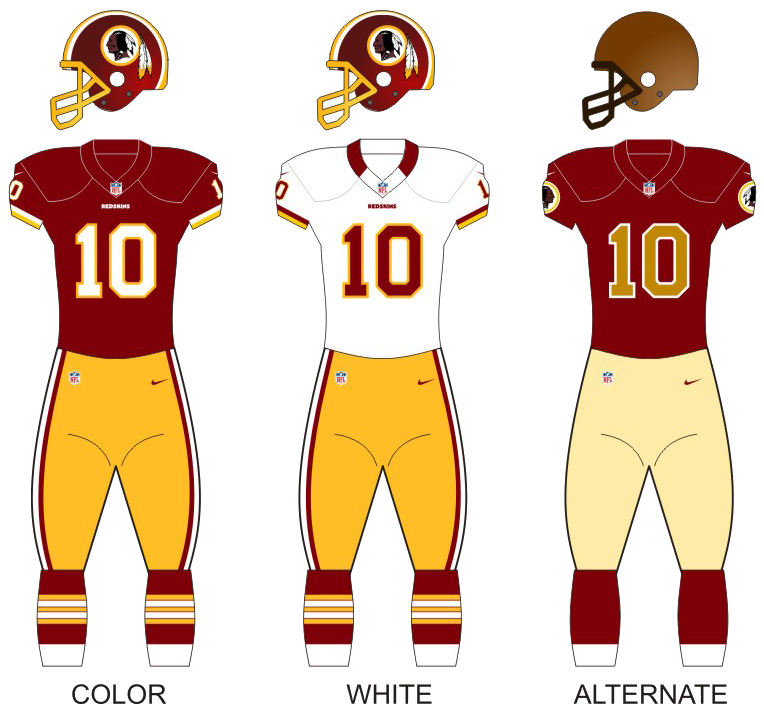

The 2014 season was the Washington Redskins' 83rd in the National Football League (NFL) and their first season under head coach Jay Gruden. They finished the season 4–12, slightly improving on their 3–13 record from 2013 and resulted in the departure of defensive coordinator Jim Haslett.

== Draft ==
2014 Washington Redskins draft
| Round | Selection | Player | Position | College |
|---|---|---|---|---|
| 1 | None — see draft trades below | | | |
| 2 | 47 | Trent Murphy | Linebacker | Stanford |
| 3 | 66 | Morgan Moses | Offensive tackle | Virginia |
| 3 | 78 | Spencer Long | Guard | Nebraska |
| 4 | 102 | Bashaud Breeland | Cornerback | Clemson |
| 5 | 142 | Ryan Grant | Wide receiver | Tulane |
| 6 | 186 | Lache Seastrunk | Running back | Baylor |
| 7 | 217 | Ted Bolser | Tight end | Indiana |
| 7 | 228 | Zach Hocker | Placekicker | Arkansas |

Draft trades

- The Redskins traded their first-round selection, along with their 2012 first- and second-round selections and their 2013 first-round selection to the St. Louis Rams in exchange for the Rams' 2012 first-round selection.
- The Redskins traded their original second-round selection (No. 34 overall) to the Dallas Cowboys in exchange for the Cowboys' second- (No. 47 overall) and third- (No. 78 overall) round selections.
- The Redskins traded their original sixth-round selection (No. 178 overall) to the Tennessee Titans in exchange for the Titans' sixth- (No. 186 overall) and seventh- (No. 228 overall) round selections.

== Personnel ==
=== Staff / Coaches ===
2014 Washington Redskins staff
| Front office: Owner – Daniel Snyder; General manager/president – Bruce Allen; Senior executive – A. J. Smith; Personnel executive – Doug Williams; Vice president of football administration – Eric Schaffer; Director of player personnel – Scott Campbell; Director of pro personnel – Alex Santos; Director of football operations – Paul Kelly; Head coaches: Head coach – Jay Gruden; Offensive coaches: Offensive coordinator — Sean McVay; Running backs – Randy Jordan; Wide receivers – Ike Hilliard; Tight ends – Wes Phillips; Offensive line – Chris Foerster; Assistant offensive line – Shane Day; Offensive quality control – Jake Peetz | Defensive coaches: Defensive coordinator – Jim Haslett; Defensive line – Jacob Burney; Outside linebackers – Brian Baker; Inside linebackers – Kirk Olivadotti; Defensive backs – Raheem Morris; Defensive quality control – Aubrey Pleasant; Special teams coaches: Special teams coordinator – Ben Kotwica; Assistant special teams – Bradford Banta; Special projects – Bret Munsey; Strength and conditioning: Director of player development – Malcolm Blacken; Head strength and conditioning – Ray Wright; Assistant strength and conditioning – Chad Englehart |

=== Final roster ===
2014 Washington Redskins roster
| Quarterbacks (QB): 8 Kirk Cousins; 10 Robert Griffin III; Running backs (RB): 29 Roy Helu; 46 Alfred Morris; 32 Silas Redd; 37 Chris Thompson; 36 Darrel Young FB; Wide receivers (WR): 88 Pierre Garçon; 14 Ryan Grant; 85 Leonard Hankerson; 11 DeSean Jackson; 89 Santana Moss; 12 Andre Roberts; Tight ends (TE): 84 Niles Paul; 82 Logan Paulsen; 86 Jordan Reed | Offensive linemen (OL): 66 Chris Chester G; 68 Tom Compton T; 69 Rishaw Johnson G; 77 Shawn Lauvao G; 67 Josh LeRibeus C/G; 78 Kory Lichtensteiger C; 60 Spencer Long G; 74 Tyler Polumbus T; 71 Trent Williams T; Defensive linemen (DL): 92 Chris Baker NT; 72 Stephen Bowen DE; 96 Barry Cofield NT; 64 Kedric Golston DE; 99 Jarvis Jenkins DE; 73 Frank Kearse DE; 79 Travian Robertson DE | Linebackers (LB): 90 Steve Beauharnais ILB; 51 Will Compton ILB; 58 Ja'Gared Davis OLB; 53 Jackson Jeffcoat OLB; 91 Ryan Kerrigan OLB; 50 Gabe Miller OLB; 56 Perry Riley ILB; 52 Keenan Robinson ILB; 54 Trevardo Williams OLB; Defensive backs (DB): 39 David Amerson CB; 30 E. J. Biggers CB; 26 Bashaud Breeland CB; 25 Ryan Clark FS; 47 Akeem Davis SS; 40 Kenny Okoro CB; 34 Trenton Robinson FS; 38 Justin Rogers CB; 41 Phillip Thomas SS; Special teams (ST): 2 Kai Forbath K; 57 Nick Sundberg LS; 5 Tress Way P | Practice squad: 94 Isaako Aaitui NT; 61 Edawn Coughman T; 83 Chase Dixon TE; 87 Je'Ron Hamm TE; 45 Michael Hill RB; 11 Colin Lockett WR; 19 Rashad Ross WR; 62 Tevita Stevens C; 75 Robert Thomas NT; 37 Trey Wolfe CB; Reserve: -- Courtney Bridget CB (IR); 23 DeAngelo Hall CB (IR); 97 Jason Hatcher DE (IR); 55 Adam Hayward ILB (IR); 35 Duke Ihenacho SS (IR); -- Tanard Jackson FS (Susp.); 16 Colt McCoy QB (IR); 31 Brandon Meriweather SS (IR); 76 Morgan Moses T (IR); 93 Trent Murphy OLB (IR); 95 Chris Neild NT (IR); 98 Brian Orakpo OLB (IR); 22 Tracy Porter CB (IR); -- Jerry Rice Jr. WR (IR); Rookies in italics 53 active, 14 reserve, 10 practice squad |

== Preseason ==
| Week | Date | Opponent | Result | Record | Venue | Recap |
|---|---|---|---|---|---|---|
| 1 | August 7 | New England Patriots | W 23–6 | 1–0 | FedExField | Recap |
| 2 | August 18 | Cleveland Browns | W 24–23 | 2–0 | FedExField | Recap |
| 3 | August 23 | at Baltimore Ravens | L 20–23 | 2–1 | M&T Bank Stadium | Recap |
| 4 | August 28 | at Tampa Bay Buccaneers | W 24–10 | 3–1 | Raymond James Stadium | Recap |

== Regular season ==
=== Schedule ===
| Week | Date | Opponent | Result | Record | Venue | Recap |
|---|---|---|---|---|---|---|
| 1 | September 7 | at Houston Texans | **L** 6–17 | 0–1 | NRG Stadium | Recap |
| 2 | September 14 | Jacksonville Jaguars | **W** 41–10 | 1–1 | FedExField | Recap |
| 3 | September 21 | at **Philadelphia Eagles** | **L** 34–37 | 1–2 | Lincoln Financial Field | Recap |
| 4 | September 25 | **New York Giants** | **L** 14–45 | 1–3 | FedExField | Recap |
| 5 | October 6 | Seattle Seahawks | **L** 17–27 | 1–4 | FedExField | Recap |
| 6 | October 12 | at Arizona Cardinals | **L** 20–30 | 1–5 | University of Phoenix Stadium | Recap |
| 7 | October 19 | Tennessee Titans | **W** 19–17 | 2–5 | FedExField | Recap |
| 8 | October 27 | at **Dallas Cowboys** | **W** 20–17 (OT) | 3–5 | AT&T Stadium | Recap |
| 9 | November 2 | at Minnesota Vikings | **L** 26–29 | 3–6 | TCF Bank Stadium | Recap |
| 10 | Bye | | | | | |
| 11 | November 16 | Tampa Bay Buccaneers | **L** 7–27 | 3–7 | FedExField | Recap |
| 12 | November 23 | at San Francisco 49ers | **L** 13–17 | 3–8 | Levi's Stadium | Recap |
| 13 | November 30 | at Indianapolis Colts | **L** 27–49 | 3–9 | Lucas Oil Stadium | Recap |
| 14 | December 7 | St. Louis Rams | **L** 0–24 | 3–10 | FedExField | Recap |
| 15 | December 14 | at **New York Giants** | **L** 13–24 | 3–11 | MetLife Stadium | Recap |
| 16 | December 20 | **Philadelphia Eagles** | **W** 27–24 | 4–11 | FedExField | Recap |
| 17 | December 28 | **Dallas Cowboys** | **L** 17–44 | 4–12 | FedExField | Recap |

Note: Intra-division opponents are in bold text.

=== Game summaries ===
==== Week 1: at Houston Texans ====
Week 1: Washington Redskins at Houston Texans – Game summary

| Quarter | 1 | 2 | 3 | 4 | Total |
|---|---|---|---|---|---|
| Redskins | 0 | 6 | 0 | 0 | **6** |
| **Texans** | 0 | 14 | 0 | 3 | **17** |

at NRG Stadium, Houston, Texas

- Date: September 7
- Game time: 1:00 p.m. EDT/12:00 p.m. CDT
- Game weather: None (retractable roof closed)
- Game attendance: 71,770
- Referee: Jerome Boger
- TV announcers (Fox): Thom Brennaman, David Diehl and Laura Okmin
- Recap, Gamebook

Game information

**First quarter**

- No scoring plays.

**Second quarter**

- WAS – Darrel Young 1-yard run (kick blocked), 6:06. Redskins 6–0. **Drive: 4 plays, 46 yards, 1:37.**
- HOU – DeAndre Hopkins 79-yard pass from Ryan Fitzpatrick (Randy Bullock kick), 4:15. Texans 7–6. **Drive: 4 plays, 90 yards, 1:51.**
- HOU – Alfred Blue 5-yard return of blocked punt (Randy Bullock kick), 2:09. Texans 14–6.

**Third quarter**

- No scoring plays.

**Fourth quarter**

- HOU – Randy Bullock 42-yard field goal, 1:55. Texans 17–6. **Drive: 13 plays, 68 yards, 6:32.**

**Top passers**

- WAS – Robert Griffin III – 29/37, 267 yards
- HOU – Ryan Fitzpatrick – 14/22, 206 yards, TD

**Top rushers**

- WAS – Alfred Morris – 14 rushes, 91 yards
- HOU – Arian Foster – 27 rushes, 103 yards

**Top receivers**

- WAS – Niles Paul – 4 receptions, 86 yards
- HOU – Andre Johnson – 6 receptions, 93 yards

==== Week 2: vs. Jacksonville Jaguars ====
Week 2: Jacksonville Jaguars at Washington Redskins – Game summary

| Quarter | 1 | 2 | 3 | 4 | Total |
|---|---|---|---|---|---|
| Jaguars | 0 | 7 | 0 | 3 | **10** |
| **Redskins** | 7 | 14 | 3 | 17 | **41** |

at FedExField, Landover, Maryland

- Date: September 14
- Game time: 1:00 p.m. EDT
- Game weather: Sunny, 65 °F (18 °C)
- Game attendance: 80,037
- Referee: Ron Torbert
- TV announcers (CBS): Spero Dedes and Solomon Wilcots
- Recap, Gamebook

Game information

**First quarter**

- WAS – Darrel Young 20-yard pass from Kirk Cousins (Kai Forbath kick), 8:12. Redskins 7–0. **Drive: 7 plays, 76 yards, 3:35.**

**Second quarter**

- WAS – Alfred Morris 1-yard run (Kai Forbath kick), 14:18. Redskins 14–0. **Drive: 7 plays, 66 yards, 3:31.**
- WAS – Alfred Morris 1-yard run (Kai Forbath kick), 7:28. Redskins 21–0. **Drive: 10 plays, 92 yards, 5:10.**
- JAX – Marcedes Lewis 63-yard pass from Chad Henne (Josh Scobee kick), 1:40. Redskins 21–7. **Drive: 5 plays, 71 yards, 1:35.**

**Third quarter**

- WAS – Kai Forbath 36-yard field goal, 8:30. Redskins 24–7. **Drive: 10 plays, 13 yards, 4:21.**

**Fourth quarter**

- WAS – Niles Paul 2-yard pass from Kirk Cousins (Kai Forbath kick), 14:17. Redskins 31–7. **Drive: 11 plays, 65 yards, 4:40.**
- WAS – Kai Forbath 42-yard field goal, 10:40. Redskins 34–7. **Drive: 6 plays, 5 yards, 2:32.**
- JAX – Josh Scobee 36-yard field goal, 6:50. Redskins 34–10. **Drive: 9 plays, 63 yards, 3:50.**
- WAS – Silas Redd 14-yard run (Kai Forbath kick), 1:52. Redskins 41–10. **Drive: 8 plays, 41 yards, 4:58.**

**Top passers**

- JAX – Chad Henne – 14/28, 193 yards, TD, INT
- WAS – Kirk Cousins – 22/33, 250 yards, 2 TD

**Top rushers**

- JAX – Chad Henne – 3 rushes, 17 yards
- WAS – Alfred Morris – 22 rushes, 85 yards, 2 TD

**Top receivers**

- JAX – Allen Robinson – 4 receptions, 75 yards
- WAS – Niles Paul – 8 receptions, 99 yards, TD

==== Week 3: at Philadelphia Eagles ====
Week 3: Washington Redskins at Philadelphia Eagles – Game summary

| Quarter | 1 | 2 | 3 | 4 | Total |
|---|---|---|---|---|---|
| Redskins | 14 | 6 | 7 | 7 | **34** |
| **Eagles** | 7 | 14 | 6 | 10 | **37** |

at Lincoln Financial Field, Philadelphia, Pennsylvania

- Date: September 21
- Game time: 1:00 p.m. EDT
- Game weather: Mostly cloudy, 79 °F (26 °C)
- Game attendance: 69,596
- Referee: Tony Corrente
- TV announcers (Fox): Joe Buck, Troy Aikman and Erin Andrews
- Recap, Gamebook

Game information

**First quarter**

- WAS – Darrel Young 4-yard pass from Kirk Cousins (Kai Forbath kick), 8:42. Redskins 7–0. **Drive: 11 plays, 82 yards, 6:18.**
- PHI – Chris Polk 102-yard kickoff return (Cody Parkey kick), 8:29. Tied 7–7. **Drive: 0 plays, 0 yards, 0:13.**
- WAS – Pierre Garçon 4-yard pass from Kirk Cousins (Kai Forbath kick), 2:09. Redskins 14–7. **Drive: 12 plays, 87 yards, 6:20.**

**Second quarter**

- WAS – Kai Forbath 49-yard field goal, 8:49. Redskins 17–7. **Drive: 12 plays, 41 yards, 5:34.**
- PHI – Jordan Matthews 11-yard pass from Nick Foles (Cody Parkey kick), 5:48. Redskins 17–14. **Drive: 8 plays, 80 yards, 3:01.**
- WAS – Kai Forbath 44-yard field goal, 1:15. Redskins 20–14. **Drive: 11 plays, 54 yards, 4:33.**
- PHI – Jordan Matthews 11-yard pass from Nick Foles (Cody Parkey kick), 0:09. Eagles 21–20. **Drive: 8 plays, 64 yards, 1:06.**

**Third quarter**

- PHI – Cody Parkey 38-yard field goal, 12:03. Eagles 24–20. **Drive: 7 plays, 60 yards, 2:57.**
- PHI – Cody Parkey 33-yard field goal, 8:04. Eagles 27–20. **Drive: 8 plays, 48 yards, 3:05.**
- WAS – DeSean Jackson 81-yard pass from Kirk Cousins (Kai Forbath kick), 2:04. Tied 27–27. **Drive: 1 play, 81 yards, 0:09.**

**Fourth quarter**

- PHI – Jeremy Maclin 27-yard pass from Nick Foles (Cody Parkey kick), 7:34. Eagles 34–27. **Drive: 7 plays, 76 yards, 2:33.**
- PHI – Cody Parkey 51-yard field goal, 5:55. Eagles 37–27. **Drive: 4 plays, 2 yards, 1:32.**
- WAS – Roy Helu 1-yard rush (Kai Forbath kick), 4:16. Eagles 37–34. **Drive: 5 plays, 80 yards, 1:39.**

**Top passers**

- WAS – Kirk Cousins – 30/48, 427 yards, 3 TD, INT
- PHI – Nick Foles – 27/41, 325 yards, 3 TD

**Top rushers**

- WAS – Alfred Morris – 23 rushes, 77 yards
- PHI – LeSean McCoy – 19 rushes, 22 yards

**Top receivers**

- WAS – Pierre Garçon – 11 receptions, 138 yards, TD
- PHI – Jeremy Maclin – 8 receptions, 154 yards, TD

==== Week 4: vs. New York Giants ====
Week 4: New York Giants at Washington Redskins – Game summary

| Quarter | 1 | 2 | 3 | 4 | Total |
|---|---|---|---|---|---|
| **Giants** | 7 | 17 | 7 | 14 | **45** |
| Redskins | 0 | 7 | 7 | 0 | **14** |

at FedExField, Landover, Maryland

- Date: September 25
- Game time: 8:25 p.m. EDT
- Game weather: Cloudy, 64 °F (18 °C)
- Game attendance: 80,573
- Referee: Carl Cheffers
- TV announcers (CBS/NFLN): Jim Nantz, Phil Simms and Tracy Wolfson
- Recap, Gamebook

Game information

**First quarter**

- NYG – Larry Donnell 5-yard pass from Eli Manning (Josh Brown kick), 7:35. Giants 7–0. **Drive: 6 plays, 24 yards, 3:07.**

**Second quarter**

- NYG – Larry Donnell 6-yard pass from Eli Manning (Josh Brown kick), 14:14. Giants 14–0. **Drive: 6 plays, 75 yards, 2:45.**
- WAS – Andre Roberts 18-yard pass from Kirk Cousins (Kai Forbath kick), 8:50. Giants 14–7. **Drive: 10 plays, 80 yards, 5:24.**
- NYG – Larry Donnell 6-yard pass from Eli Manning (Josh Brown kick), 2:16. Giants 21–7. **Drive: 12 plays, 67 yards, 6:34.**
- NYG – Josh Brown 29-yard field goal, 0:00. Giants 24–7. **Drive: 8 plays, 71 yards, 1:16.**

**Third quarter**

- WAS – Alfred Morris 20-yard run (Kai Forbath kick), 12:57. Giants 24–14. **Drive: 5 plays, 83 yards, 2:03.**
- NYG – Daniel Fells 2-yard pass from Eli Manning (Josh Brown kick), 4:19. Giants 31–14. **Drive: 4 plays, 35 yards, 1:19.**

**Fourth quarter**

- NYG – Eli Manning 1-yard run (Josh Brown kick), 14:07. Giants 38–14. **Drive: 5 plays, 22 yards, 1:22.**
- NYG – Andre Williams 1-yard run (Josh Brown kick), 6:05. Giants 45–14. **Drive: 9 plays, 46 yards, 5:25.**

**Top passers**

- NYG – Eli Manning – 28/39, 300 yards, 4 TD, INT
- WAS – Kirk Cousins – 19/33, 257 yards, TD, 4 INT

**Top rushers**

- NYG – Andre Williams – 15 rushes, 66 yards, TD
- WAS – Alfred Morris – 12 rushes, 63 yards, TD

**Top receivers**

- NYG – Victor Cruz – 6 receptions, 108 yards
- WAS – Roy Helu – 5 receptions, 78 yards

==== Week 5: vs. Seattle Seahawks ====
Week 5: Seattle Seahawks at Washington Redskins – Game summary

| Quarter | 1 | 2 | 3 | 4 | Total |
|---|---|---|---|---|---|
| **Seahawks** | 7 | 10 | 0 | 10 | **27** |
| Redskins | 0 | 7 | 3 | 7 | **17** |

at FedExField, Landover, Maryland

- Date: October 6
- Game time: 8:30 p.m. EDT
- Game weather: Clear, 67 °F (19 °C)
- Game attendance: 79,522
- Referee: Jeff Triplette
- TV announcers (ESPN): Mike Tirico, Jon Gruden and Lisa Salters
- Recap, Gamebook

Game information

**First quarter**

- SEA – Jermaine Kearse 15-yard pass from Russell Wilson (Steven Hauschka kick), 12:44. Seahawks 7–0. **Drive: 6 plays, 65 yards, 2:16.**

**Second quarter**

- SEA – Steven Hauschka 40-yard field goal, 9:04. Seahawks 10–0. **Drive: 8 plays, 31 yards, 4:49.**
- SEA – Russell Wilson 9-yard run (Steven Hauschka kick), 4:37. Seahawks 17–0. **Drive: 5 plays, 70 yards, 2:44.**
- WAS – DeSean Jackson 60-yard pass from Kirk Cousins (Kai Forbath kick), 2:32. Seahawks 17–7. **Drive: 4 plays, 80 yards, 2:05.**

**Third quarter**

- WAS – Kai Forbath 27-yard field goal, 10:41. Seahawks 17–10. **Drive: 7 plays, 71 yards, 4:19.**

**Fourth quarter**

- SEA – Marshawn Lynch 9-yard pass from Russell Wilson (Steven Hauschka kick), 6:31. Seahawks 24–10. **Drive: 12 plays, 53 yards, 7:33.**
- WAS – Andre Roberts 6-yard pass from Kirk Cousins (Kai Forbath kick), 3:35. Seahawks 24–17. **Drive: 11 plays, 80 yards, 2:56.**
- SEA – Steven Hauschka 43-yard field goal, 0:21. Seahawks 27–17. **Drive: 8 plays, 55 yards, 3:14.**

**Top passers**

- SEA – Russell Wilson – 18/24, 201 yards, 2 TD
- WAS – Kirk Cousins – 21/36, 283 yards, 2 TD

**Top rushers**

- SEA – Russell Wilson – 11 rushes, 122 yards, TD
- WAS – Alfred Morris – 13 rushes, 29 yards

**Top receivers**

- SEA – Doug Baldwin – 4 receptions, 50 yards
- WAS – DeSean Jackson – 5 receptions, 157 yards, TD

==== Week 6: at Arizona Cardinals ====
Week 6: Washington Redskins at Arizona Cardinals – Game summary

| Quarter | 1 | 2 | 3 | 4 | Total |
|---|---|---|---|---|---|
| Redskins | 0 | 13 | 0 | 7 | **20** |
| **Cardinals** | 7 | 7 | 3 | 13 | **30** |

at University of Phoenix Stadium, Glendale, Arizona

- Date: October 12
- Game time: 4:25 p.m. EDT/1:25 p.m. Arizona time
- Game weather: None (retractable roof closed)
- Game attendance: 61,139
- Referee: Ed Hochuli
- TV announcers (Fox): Dick Stockton, Brady Quinn and Kris Budden
- Recap, Gamebook

Game information

**First quarter**

- ARI – Michael Floyd 20-yard pass from Carson Palmer (Chandler Catanzaro kick), 3:08. Cardinals 7–0. **Drive: 5 plays, 41 yards, 2:13.**

**Second quarter**

- WAS – DeSean Jackson 64-yard pass from Kirk Cousins (Kai Forbath kick), 14:03. Tied 7–7. **Drive: 7 plays, 82 yards, 4:05.**
- WAS – Kai Forbath 28-yard field goal, 8:20. Redskins 10–7. **Drive: 10 plays, 60 yards, 4:09.**
- ARI – Larry Fitzgerald 24-yard pass from Carson Palmer (Chandler Catanzaro kick), 0:31. Cardinals 14–10. **Drive: 8 plays, 85 yards, 2:18.**
- WAS – Kai Forbath 43-yard field goal, 0:02. Cardinals 14–13. **Drive: 4 plays, 55 yards, 0:29.**

**Third quarter**

- ARI – Chandler Catanzaro 33-yard field goal, 4:13. Cardinals 17–13. **Drive: 14 plays, 69 yards, 7:23.**

**Fourth quarter**

- ARI – Chandler Catanzaro 49-yard field goal, 12:54. Cardinals 20–13. **Drive: 8 plays, 39 yards, 4:50.**
- ARI – Chandler Catanzaro 37-yard field goal, 10:27. Cardinals 23–13. **Drive: 6 plays, 8 yards, 2:13.**
- WAS – Pierre Garçon 5-yard pass from Kirk Cousins (Kai Forbath kick), 2:17. Cardinals 23–20. **Drive: 4 plays, 64 yards, 1:26.**
- ARI – Rashad Johnson 28-yard interception return (Chandler Catanzaro kick), 0:18. Cardinals 30–20.

**Top passers**

- WAS – Kirk Cousins – 24/38, 354 yards, 2 TD, 3 INT
- ARI – Carson Palmer – 28/44, 250 yards, 2 TD

**Top rushers**

- WAS – Alfred Morris – 13 rushes, 41 yards
- ARI – Andre Ellington – 19 rushes, 67 yards

**Top receivers**

- WAS – DeSean Jackson – 3 receptions, 115 yards, TD
- ARI – Larry Fitzgerald – 6 receptions, 98 yards, TD

The loss ended the Redskins' eight-game winning streak against the Cardinals, losing to them for the first time since the 2000 season, when both teams were members of the NFC East.

==== Week 7: vs. Tennessee Titans ====
Week 7: Tennessee Titans at Washington Redskins – Game summary

| Quarter | 1 | 2 | 3 | 4 | Total |
|---|---|---|---|---|---|
| Titans | 3 | 7 | 0 | 7 | **17** |
| **Redskins** | 3 | 3 | 7 | 6 | **19** |

at FedExField, Landover, Maryland

- Date: October 19
- Game time: 1:00 p.m. EDT
- Game weather: Sunny, 55 °F (13 °C)
- Game attendance: 75,227
- Referee: Walt Anderson
- TV announcers (CBS): Kevin Harlan and Rich Gannon
- Recap, Gamebook

Game information

**First quarter**

- WAS – Kai Forbath 31-yard field goal, 10:08. Redskins 3–0. **Drive: 9 plays, 67 yards, 4:52.**
- TEN – Ryan Succop 36-yard field goal, 3:41. Tied 3–3. **Drive: 4 plays, −3 yards, 1:31.**

**Second quarter**

- WAS – Kai Forbath 31-yard field goal, 7:34. Redskins 6–3. **Drive: 10 plays, 68 yards, 5:18.**
- TEN – Kendall Wright 14-yard pass from Charlie Whitehurst (Ryan Succop kick), 1:04. Titans 10–6. **Drive: 5 plays, 37 yards, 2:09.**

**Third quarter**

- WAS – Pierre Garçon 70-yard pass from Colt McCoy (Kai Forbath kick), 12:27. Redskins 13–10. **Drive: 2 plays, 71 yards, 0:48.**

**Fourth quarter**

- WAS – Kai Forbath 27-yard field goal, 13:27. Redskins 16–10. **Drive: 5 plays, 15 yards, 1:55.**
- TEN – Derek Hagan 38-yard pass from Charlie Whitehurst (Ryan Succop kick), 7:41. Titans 17–16. **Drive: 8 plays, 80 yards, 5:46.**
- WAS – Kai Forbath 22-yard field goal, 0:00. Redskins 19–17. **Drive: 10 plays, 76 yards, 3:14.**

**Top passers**

- TEN – Charlie Whitehurst – 17/26, 160 yards, 2 TD, INT
- WAS – Kirk Cousins – 10/16, 139 yards, INT

**Top rushers**

- TEN – Bishop Sankey – 16 rushes, 56 yards
- WAS – Alfred Morris – 18 rushes, 54 yards

**Top receivers**

- TEN – Kendall Wright – 6 receptions, 68 yards
- WAS – Pierre Garçon – 5 receptions, 87 yards, TD

==== Week 8: at Dallas Cowboys ====
Week 8: Washington Redskins at Dallas Cowboys – Game summary

| Quarter | 1 | 2 | 3 | 4 | OT | Total |
|---|---|---|---|---|---|---|
| **Redskins** | 3 | 0 | 7 | 7 | 3 | **20** |
| Cowboys | 0 | 7 | 3 | 7 | 0 | **17** |

at AT&T Stadium, Arlington, Texas

- Date: October 27
- Game time: 8:30 p.m. EDT/7:30 p.m. CDT
- Game weather: None (retractable roof closed)
- Game attendance: 87,055
- Referee: Tony Corrente
- TV announcers (ESPN): Mike Tirico, Jon Gruden and Lisa Salters
- Recap, Gamebook

Game information

**First quarter**

- WAS – Kai Forbath 44-yard field goal, 9:48. Redskins 3–0. **Drive: 6 plays, 22 yards, 2:39.**

**Second quarter**

- DAL – Dez Bryant 5-yard pass from Tony Romo (Dan Bailey kick), 4:45. Cowboys 7–3. **Drive: 8 plays, 80 yards, 4:18.**

**Third quarter**

- WAS – Alfred Morris 5-yard run (Kai Forbath kick), 9:51. Redskins 10–7. **Drive: 8 plays, 80 yards, 5:09.**
- DAL – Dan Bailey 21-yard field goal, 4:03. Tied 10–10. **Drive: 5 plays, 54 yards, 1:40.**

**Fourth quarter**

- WAS – Colt McCoy 7-yard run (Kai Forbath kick), 13:38. Redskins 17–10. **Drive: 9 plays, 80 yards, 5:25.**
- DAL – Jason Witten 25-yard pass from Brandon Weeden, 9:27. Tied 17–17. **Drive: 8 plays, 80 yards, 4:11.**

**Overtime**

- WAS – Kai Forbath 40-yard field goal, 9:43. Redskins 20–17. **Drive: 9 plays, 58 yards, 5:17.**

**Top passers**

- WAS – Colt McCoy – 25/30, 299 yards, INT
- DAL – Tony Romo – 17/28, 209 yards, TD

**Top rushers**

- WAS – Alfred Morris – 18 rushes, 73 yards, TD
- DAL – DeMarco Murray – 19 rushes, 141 yards

**Top receivers**

- WAS – DeSean Jackson – 6 receptions, 136 yards
- DAL – DeMarco Murray – 4 receptions, 80 yards

Colt McCoy made his first start as a Redskin. With the win, the Redskins snapped an eight-game losing streak against division opponents.

==== Week 9: at Minnesota Vikings ====
Week 9: Washington Redskins at Minnesota Vikings – Game summary

| Quarter | 1 | 2 | 3 | 4 | Total |
|---|---|---|---|---|---|
| Redskins | 3 | 7 | 10 | 6 | **26** |
| **Vikings** | 0 | 7 | 7 | 15 | **29** |

at TCF Bank Stadium, Minneapolis, Minnesota

- Date: November 2
- Game time: 1:00 p.m. EST/12:00 p.m. CST
- Game weather: Sunny, 50 °F (10 °C)
- Game attendance: 52,252
- Referee: Gene Steratore
- TV announcers (Fox): Chris Myers, Ronde Barber and Jennifer Hale
- Recap, Gamebook

Game information

**First quarter**

- WAS – Kai Forbath 36-yard field goal, 6:16. Redskins 3–0. **Drive: 13 plays, 62 yards, 7:49.**

**Second quarter**

- WAS – Alfred Morris 14-yard run, 14:46. Redskins 10–0. **Drive: 6 plays, 91 yards, 2:22.**
- MIN – Chase Ford 20-yard pass from Teddy Bridgewater (Blair Walsh kick), 0:36. Redskins 10–7. **Drive: 4 plays, 46 yards, 0:23.**

**Third quarter**

- MIN – Matt Asiata 1-yard run (Blair Walsh kick), 10:44. Vikings 14–10. **Drive: 6 plays, 56 yards, 2:15.**
- WAS – DeSean Jackson 13-yard pass from Robert Griffin III (Kai Forbath kick), 7:23. Redskins 17–14. **Drive: 7 plays, 56 yards, 3:21.**
- WAS – Kai Forbath 26-yard field goal, 1:57. Redskins 20–14. **Drive: 9 plays, 43 yards, 3:26.**

**Fourth quarter**

- MIN – Matt Asiata 7-yard run (Blair Walsh kick), 13:00. Vikings 21–20. **Drive: 10 plays, 76 yards, 3:57.**
- WAS – Alfred Morris 2-yard run (run failed), 9:01. Redskins 26–21. **Drive: 8 plays, 80 yards, 3:59.**
- MIN – Matt Asiata 1-yard run (Matt Asiata run), 3:27. Vikings 29–26. **Drive: 12 plays, 73 yards, 5:34.**

**Top passers**

- WAS – Robert Griffin III – 18/28, 251 yards, TD, INT
- MIN – Teddy Bridgewater – 26/42, 268 yards, TD

**Top rushers**

- WAS – Alfred Morris – 19 rushes, 92 yards, 2 TD
- MIN – Jerick McKinnon – 14 rushes, 54 yards

**Top receivers**

- WAS – DeSean Jackson – 4 receptions, 120 yards, TD
- MIN – Greg Jennings – 6 receptions, 76 yards

==== Week 11: vs. Tampa Bay Buccaneers ====
Week 11: Tampa Bay Buccaneers at Washington Redskins – Game summary

| Quarter | 1 | 2 | 3 | 4 | Total |
|---|---|---|---|---|---|
| **Buccaneers** | 10 | 3 | 7 | 7 | **27** |
| Redskins | 0 | 7 | 0 | 0 | **7** |

at FedExField, Landover, Maryland

- Date: November 16
- Game time: 1:00 p.m. EST
- Game weather: Cloudy, 45 °F (7 °C)
- Game attendance: 77,442
- Referee: Bill Vinovich
- TV announcers (Fox): Dick Stockton, Kirk Morrison and Kristina Pink
- Recap, Gamebook

==== Week 12: at San Francisco 49ers ====
Week 12: Washington Redskins at San Francisco 49ers – Game summary

| Quarter | 1 | 2 | 3 | 4 | Total |
|---|---|---|---|---|---|
| Redskins | 0 | 7 | 3 | 3 | **13** |
| **49ers** | 7 | 3 | 0 | 7 | **17** |

at Levi's Stadium, San Francisco, California

- Date: November 23
- Game time: 4:25 p.m. EST/1:25 p.m. PST
- Game weather: Cloudy, 62 °F (17 °C)
- Game attendance: 70,799
- Referee: Walt Anderson
- TV announcers (CBS): Kevin Harlan and Rich Gannon
- Recap, Gamebook

==== Week 13: at Indianapolis Colts ====
Week 13: Washington Redskins at Indianapolis Colts – Game summary

| Quarter | 1 | 2 | 3 | 4 | Total |
|---|---|---|---|---|---|
| Redskins | 3 | 7 | 14 | 3 | **27** |
| **Colts** | 7 | 14 | 21 | 7 | **49** |

at Lucas Oil Stadium, Indianapolis, Indiana

- Date: November 30
- Game time: 1:00 p.m. EST
- Game weather: None (retractable roof closed)
- Game attendance: 65,352
- Referee: John Parry
- TV announcers (Fox): Kenny Albert, Daryl Johnston and Tony Siragusa
- Recap, Gamebook

With the loss, Washington fell to 3–9, 2–2 against the AFC South, and was officially eliminated from playoff contention for a second straight year.

==== Week 14: vs. St. Louis Rams ====
Week 14: St. Louis Rams at Washington Redskins – Game summary

| Quarter | 1 | 2 | 3 | 4 | Total |
|---|---|---|---|---|---|
| **Rams** | 0 | 6 | 18 | 0 | **24** |
| Redskins | 0 | 0 | 0 | 0 | **0** |

at FedExField, Landover, Maryland

- Date: December 7
- Game time: 1:00 p.m. EST
- Game weather: Sunny, 45 °F (7 °C)
- Game attendance: 71,120
- Referee: Brad Allen
- TV announcers (Fox): Sam Rosen, Kirk Morrison and Peter Schrager
- Recap, Gamebook

==== Week 15: at New York Giants ====
Week 15: Washington Redskins at New York Giants – Game summary

| Quarter | 1 | 2 | 3 | 4 | Total |
|---|---|---|---|---|---|
| Redskins | 3 | 7 | 3 | 0 | **13** |
| **Giants** | 7 | 0 | 10 | 7 | **24** |

at MetLife Stadium, East Rutherford, New Jersey

- Date: December 14
- Game time: 1:00 p.m. EST
- Game weather: Cloudy, 43 °F (6 °C)
- Game attendance: 77,628
- Referee: Jeff Triplette
- TV announcers (Fox): Kenny Albert, Daryl Johnston and Tony Siragusa
- Recap, Gamebook

==== Week 16: vs. Philadelphia Eagles ====
Week 16: Philadelphia Eagles at Washington Redskins – Game summary

| Quarter | 1 | 2 | 3 | 4 | Total |
|---|---|---|---|---|---|
| Eagles | 7 | 7 | 0 | 10 | **24** |
| **Redskins** | 10 | 0 | 14 | 3 | **27** |

at FedExField, Landover, Maryland

- Date: December 20
- Game time: 4:30 p.m. EST
- Game weather: Cloudy, 37 °F (3 °C)
- Game attendance: 78,897
- Referee: Carl Cheffers
- TV announcers (NFLN): Kevin Harlan, Rich Gannon and Stacey Dales
- Recap, Gamebook

==== Week 17: vs. Dallas Cowboys ====
Week 17: Dallas Cowboys at Washington Redskins – Game summary

| Quarter | 1 | 2 | 3 | 4 | Total |
|---|---|---|---|---|---|
| **Cowboys** | 17 | 10 | 0 | 17 | **44** |
| Redskins | 7 | 3 | 0 | 7 | **17** |

at FedExField, Landover, Maryland

- Date: December 28
- Game time: 1:00 p.m. EST
- Game weather: Cloudy, 58 °F (14 °C)
- Game attendance: 80,897
- Referee: Jerome Boger
- TV announcers (Fox): Kevin Burkhardt, John Lynch and Pam Oliver
- Recap, Gamebook

=== Standings ===
==== Division ====
NFC East
| | W | L | T | PCT | DIV | CONF | PF | PA | STK |
|---|---|---|---|---|---|---|---|---|---|
| ^{(3)} Dallas Cowboys | 12 | 4 | 0 | .750 | 4–2 | 8–4 | 467 | 352 | W4 |
| Philadelphia Eagles | 10 | 6 | 0 | .625 | 4–2 | 6–6 | 474 | 400 | W1 |
| New York Giants | 6 | 10 | 0 | .375 | 2–4 | 4–8 | 380 | 400 | L1 |
| Washington Redskins | 4 | 12 | 0 | .250 | 2–4 | 2–10 | 301 | 438 | L1 |

==== Conference ====
NFC
| # | Team | Division | W | L | T | PCT | DIV | CONF | SOS | SOV | STK |
|---|---|---|---|---|---|---|---|---|---|---|---|
**Division leaders**
| 1 (Note: Seattle, Green Bay and Dallas were ranked in seeds 1–3 based on conference record.) | Seattle Seahawks | West | 12 | 4 | 0 | .750 | 5–1 | 10–2 | .525 | .513 | W6 |
| 2 | Green Bay Packers | North | 12 | 4 | 0 | .750 | 5–1 | 9–3 | .482 | .440 | W2 |
| 3 | Dallas Cowboys | East | 12 | 4 | 0 | .750 | 4–2 | 8–4 | .445 | .422 | W4 |
| 4 | Carolina Panthers | South | 7 | 8 | 1 | .469 | 4–2 | 6–6 | .490 | .357 | W4 |
**Wild Cards**
| 5 (Note: Arizona defeated Detroit head-to-head (Week 11, 14–6).) | Arizona Cardinals | West | 11 | 5 | 0 | .688 | 3–3 | 8–4 | .523 | .477 | L2 |
| 6 | Detroit Lions | North | 11 | 5 | 0 | .688 | 5–1 | 9–3 | .471 | .392 | L1 |
**Did not qualify for the postseason**
| 7 | Philadelphia Eagles | East | 10 | 6 | 0 | .625 | 4–2 | 6–6 | .490 | .416 | W1 |
| 8 | San Francisco 49ers | West | 8 | 8 | 0 | .500 | 2–4 | 7–5 | .527 | .508 | W1 |
| 9 (Note: New Orleans defeated Minnesota head-to-head (Week 3, 20–9).) | New Orleans Saints | South | 7 | 9 | 0 | .438 | 3–3 | 6–6 | .486 | .415 | W1 |
| 10 | Minnesota Vikings | North | 7 | 9 | 0 | .438 | 1–5 | 6–6 | .475 | .308 | W1 |
| 11 (Note: The NY Giants defeated both Atlanta and St. Louis head-to-head (Atlanta: Week 5, 30–20; St. Louis: Week 16, 37–27), while Atlanta finished ahead of St. Louis based on conference record.) | New York Giants | East | 6 | 10 | 0 | .375 | 2–4 | 4–8 | .512 | .323 | L1 |
| 12 | Atlanta Falcons | South | 6 | 10 | 0 | .375 | 5–1 | 6–6 | .482 | .380 | L1 |
| 13 | St. Louis Rams | West | 6 | 10 | 0 | .375 | 2–4 | 4–8 | .531 | .427 | L3 |
| 14 | Chicago Bears | North | 5 | 11 | 0 | .313 | 1–5 | 4–8 | .529 | .338 | L5 |
| 15 | Washington Redskins | East | 4 | 12 | 0 | .250 | 2–4 | 2–10 | .496 | .422 | L1 |
| 16 | Tampa Bay Buccaneers | South | 2 | 14 | 0 | .125 | 0–6 | 1–11 | .486 | .469 | L6 |
**Tiebreakers** (Note: When breaking ties for three or more teams under the NFL's rules, they are first broken within divisions, then comparing only the highest-ranked remaining team from each division.)

== Honors ==
Prior to the 2014 season, three Redskins were voted onto the NFL Network's Top 100 Players of 2014. Pierre Garçon was voted by his peers as the 80th best player overall in the league while DeSean Jackson and Trent Williams landed at spots 63 and 60, respectively. While Williams improved in rank from #99 in 2013, teammates Robert Griffin III and Alfred Morris, who were voted 15th and 64th the previous season, did not make the 2014 list.
