= Devon Kennard =

American football player (born 1991)

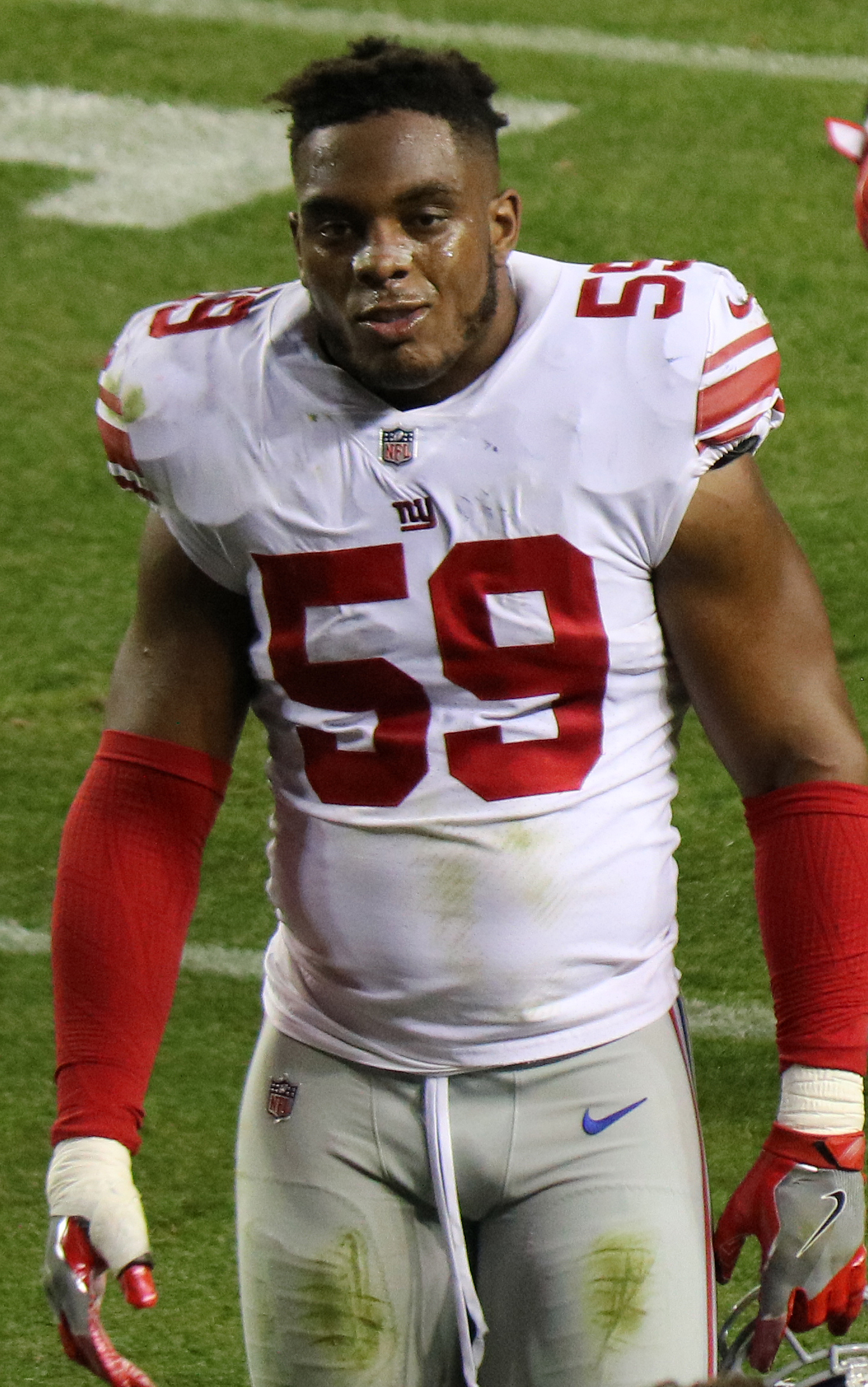
- Kennard with the New York Giants in 2017

No. 59, 42, 47
- Position: Linebacker

Personal information
- Born: June 24, 1991 (age 35); Tempe, Arizona, U.S.
- Listed height: 6 ft 3 in (1.91 m)
- Listed weight: 256 lb (116 kg)

Career information
- High school: Desert Vista (Phoenix, Arizona)
- College: USC (2009–2013)
- NFL draft: 2014: 5th round, 174th overall pick

Career history
- New York Giants (2014–2017); Detroit Lions (2018–2019); Arizona Cardinals (2020–2022); Baltimore Ravens (2022)*
- * Offseason or practice squad member only

Awards and highlights
- Second-team All-Pac-12 (2013)

Career NFL statistics
- Total tackles: 357
- Sacks: 26.5
- Forced fumbles: 4
- Fumble recoveries: 6
- Interceptions: 1
- Defensive touchdowns: 1
- Stats at Pro Football Reference

Devon Kennard (born June 24, 1991) is an American former professional football player who was a linebacker in the National Football League (NFL). He was selected by the New York Giants in the fifth round of the 2014 NFL draft. In 2018, Kennard signed with the Detroit Lions. He was team captain in 2018 and 2019 and nominated for the Walter Payton Man of The Year Award in 2019. He played college football for the USC Trojans.

== Early life ==
As a sophomore in 2006, Kennard recorded 81 tackles and seven quarterback sacks. During his junior year, he had 111 tackles and 24 1/2 sacks, helping the Desert Vista Thunder to the Class 5A Division I title game. For his senior year, Kennard was expected to play both fullback and tailback on offense for the Thunder in addition to his defensive duties, until top tailback Marcus Washington, an Arizona State recruit, returned from a stress fracture in his leg.

In Desert Vista's 21–20 victory over Chandler High School, Kennard suffered a torn anterior cruciate ligament in his right knee, causing him to miss the rest of the football season. On the season Kennard had 16 carries for 132 yards with five touchdowns. Defensively, he had 18 tackles and 1 1/2 sacks while facing double and triple teams. He played in the 2009 U.S. Army All-American Bowl.

Recruited by over forty schools nationwide, Kennard initially considered Arizona State, California, Florida, Miami, North Carolina, Oregon, Texas, UCLA, and USC. He eventually cut his list to California, Texas and USC. Kennard attended summer camps with USC following his sophomore and junior seasons in high school, and grew close to USC-commit Matt Barkley. At one point, Barkley and Kennard were ranked #1 and #2 for overall prospects in the class of 2009 by Rivals.com. He was rated the No. 1 defensive prospect by a CSTV analyst, and the top defensive end by ESPN.com.

Kennard called the recruiting process "a business", telling his local paper, "They're trying to go after good players. They think you're a good player, and that's an honor, but they think somebody else is a good player, too. If you get all caught up, your head is going to get huge. I consider the whole process a business. It's a business on my end and on theirs. They've got to try to get the best players and I've got to try to go to the best program for me." Kennard announced his decision to attend USC at press conference on January 27, 2009.

== College career ==
In his true freshman year at USC, Kennard began the season as a backup defensive end, but by midseason was seeing key action primarily in pass rushing situations. He then was moved to strongside linebacker. Appearing in 12 games and starting in five, he had 34 tackles, including 2 for losses, plus 3 deflections, 1 fumble recovery and 1 forced fumble. He made the 2009 Pac-10 All-Freshman first-teams by ESPN and Sporting News, and won USC's John McKay Award.

In 2010, Kennard was moved and started at a third position, middle linebacker, where he played in all thirteen games, with games starts, and had 72 tackles, including 7 for losses with 2 sacks. Kennard moved back to defensive end for the 2011 season, where he played in all twelve games, with five starts, and 29 tackles, including 4 for losses (with 2 sacks, one which resulted in a safety). Kennard sat out the 2012 season with a torn chest muscle.

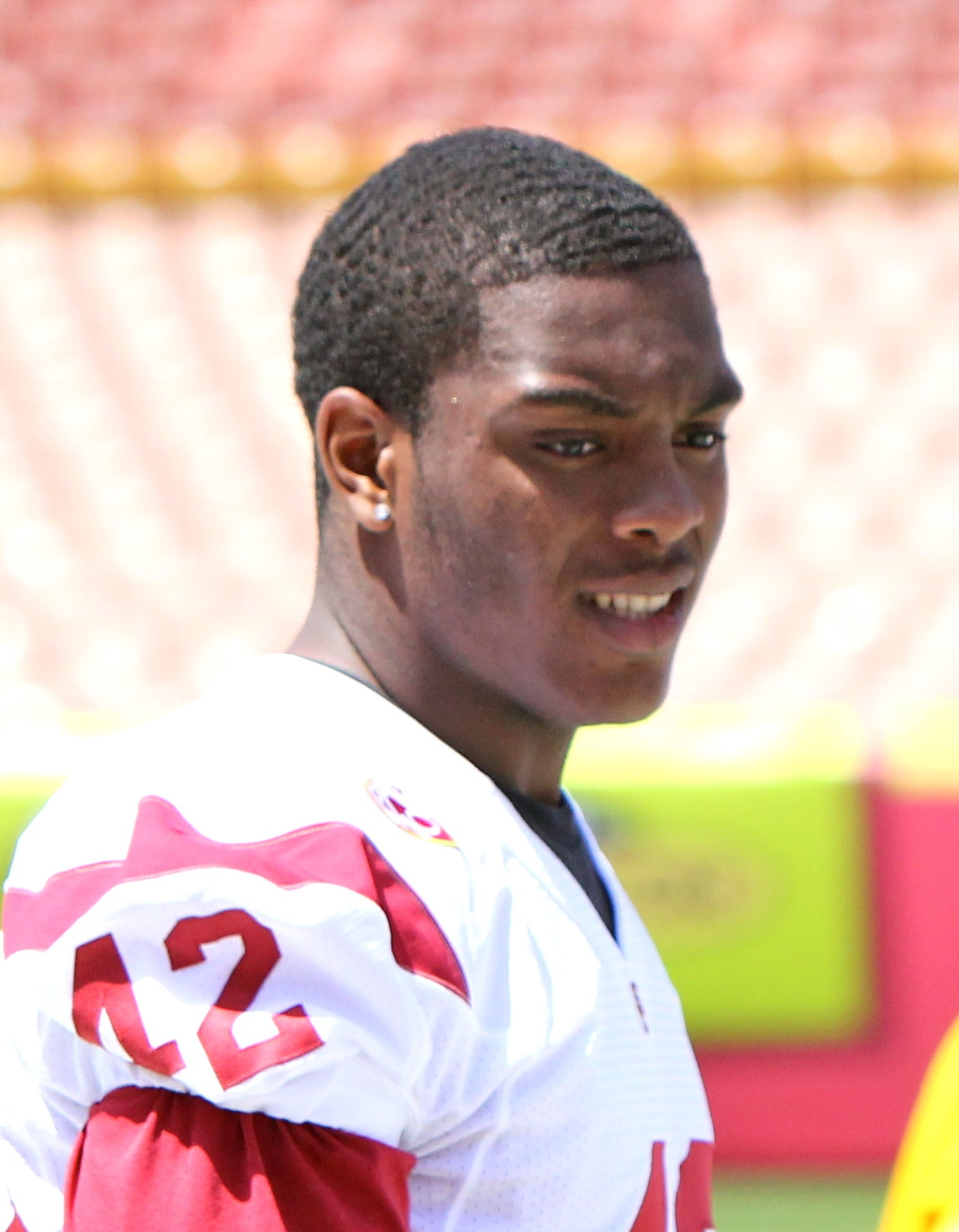
With the USC Trojans.

In 2013, Kennard started all thirteen games at outside linebacker, recording 60 tackles and team-highs of 13.5 tackles for loss, nine sacks, and ten quarterbacks hits. He made the All-Pac-12 Defensive Team and was named a Lott Trophy Finalist.

Kennard graduated from the University of Southern California with an undergraduate degree in Communications and a master's degree in Communication Management, with a focus in business management. He completed his undergraduate degree in 3 years, his master's in 1.5 years, and maintained a 3.8 GPA.

== Professional career ==
=== Pre-draft ===
On December 12, 2013, it was announced that Kennard had accepted his invitation to play in the East-West Shrine Game. On January 18, 2014, Kennard recorded two solo tackles as part of Romeo Crennel's West team that lost 23–13 to the East in the 2014 East-West Shrine Game. Kennard attended the NFL Scouting Combine in Indianapolis and completed all of the combine and positional drills.

External videos
- Devon Kennard's NFL Combine Workout

On March 12, 2014, he participated at USC's pro day, but opted to stand on his combine numbers and only performed positional drills. Kennard attended a pre-draft visit with the New York Giants and impressed the coaching staff with his intelligence. At the conclusion of the pre-draft process, Kennard was projected to be a fifth or sixth round pick by NFL draft experts and scouts. He was ranked the 17th best outside linebacker prospect in the draft by DraftScout.com and was ranked the 26th best linebacker by Scouts Inc.

Pre-draft measurables
Height	Weight	Arm length	Hand span	40-yard dash	10-yard split	20-yard split	20-yard shuttle	Three-cone drill	Vertical jump	Broad jump	Bench press
6 ft 3 in (1.91 m)	249 lb (113 kg)	33 3/8 in (0.85 m)	9 3/8 in (0.24 m)	4.70 s	1.64 s	2.73 s	4.32 s	7.25 s	30 in (0.76 m)	9 ft 5 in (2.87 m)	23 reps
All values from NFL Combine

=== New York Giants ===
==== 2014 ====
The New York Giants selected Kennard in the fifth round (174th overall) of the 2014 NFL draft. Kennard was the 24th linebacker drafted in 2014 and one of three players from USC.

"He made a great impression. He played multiple positions. He's a tough hard-nosed football player. He was great on the board. He was great on that. He really convinced the coaches he was really a sharp football player."

— Tom Coughlin

New York Giants' head coach (2014)

(On drafting Devon Kennard)

On May 19, 2014, the Giants signed Kennard to a four-year, $2.36 million contract that includes a signing bonus of $144,560.

Throughout training camp, Kennard competed against Mark Herzlich to be the backup middle linebacker, but also worked out at outside linebacker. Head coach Tom Coughlin named Kennard a backup outside linebacker to begin the season in 2014, behind starters Jameel McClain and Jacquian Williams.

He made his professional regular season debut in the New York Giants' season-opening 35–14 loss at the Detroit Lions. Kennard was inactive for the next three games (Weeks 2–4) due to a hamstring injury. In Week 11, Kennard earned his first career start after Jacquian Williams sustained a concussion the previous week. Kennard finished the Giants' 16–10 loss to the San Francisco 49ers with a season-high nine combined tackles. He remained the starter after Williams was placed on injured reserve. On November 30, 2014, Kennard recorded three combined tackles and a season-high two sacks during a 25–24 loss at the Jacksonville Jaguars in Week 13. Kennard made his first career sack on Jaguars' quarterback Blake Bortles for a nine-yard loss in the third quarter. The following week, Kennard recorded six solo tackles and tied his season-high of two sacks in the Giants' 36–7 win at the Tennessee Titans in Week 14. He made both his sacks on Titans' quarterback Zach Mettenberger. Kennard was inactive in the Giants' Week 17 loss to the Philadelphia Eagles after sustaining a toe the previous week. He finished his rookie season in 2014 with 43 combined tackles (35 solo), 4.5 sacks, two forced fumbles, and a pass deflection in 12 games and six starts.

==== 2015 ====
On January 7, 2015, the New York Giants fired defensive coordinator Perry Fewell after the defense ranked 29th in the league in 2015. On January 15, 2015, the New York Giants hired the Baltimore Ravens' former secondary coach Steve Spagnuolo to be their new defensive coordinator.

During training camp in 2015, Kennard competed to be a starting outside linebacker against Mark Herzlich, J. T. Thomas, and Jonathan Casillas. Head coach Tom Coughlin named Kennard the starting strongside linebacker to begin the regular season, alongside J.T. Thomas and starting middle linebacker Jon Beason.

External videos
- Devon Kennard's first career interception

In Week 2, he collected a season-high ten combined tackles (seven solo) and deflected a pass during a 24–20 loss to the Atlanta Falcons. On October 4, 2015, Kennard made five combined tackles, deflected two passes, and made his first career interception in the Giants' 24–10 win at the Buffalo Bills in Week 4. Kennard made his first career interception off a pass by Bills' quarterback Tyrod Taylor, that was originally intended for tight end Charles Clay, in the first quarter. He missed two games (Weeks 5–6) due to a hamstring injury he suffered in Week 4. In Week 12, he tied his season-high of ten combined tackles (five solo) in a 20–14 loss at the Washington Redskins. He missed four games (Weeks 13–16) due injuries to his foot and hamstring. On December 28, 2015, the New York Giants officially placed Kennard on season-ending injured reserve due injuries to his foot and hamstring. Kennard finished the season with 58 combined tackles (37 solo), four pass deflections, and one interception in nine games and nine starts.

==== 2016 ====
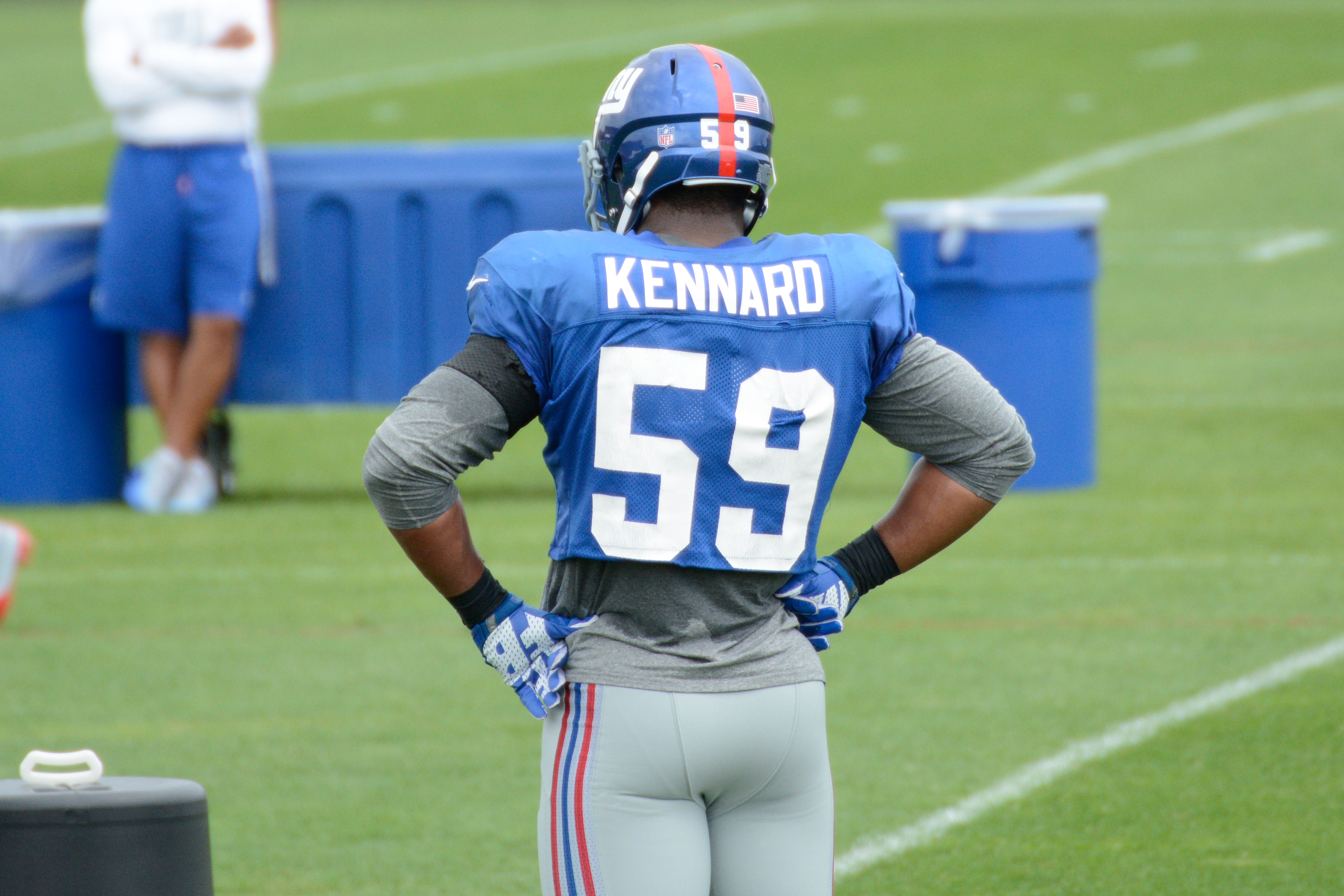
Kennard with the Giants in 2016

On January 5, 2016, Coughlin announced his resignation as head coach. On January 14, 2016, the New York Giants promoted offensive coordinator Ben McAdoo to head coach.

Kennard entered training camp slated as a starting outside linebacker. Head coach Ben McAdoo as named him the starting strongside linebacker, alongside Jonathan Casillas and starting middle linebacker Kelvin Sheppard. In Week 5, he collected a season-high seven combined tackles during a 23–16 loss at the Green Bay Packers. Kennard recorded 61 combined tackles (40 solo), one sack, one pass defensed, and a forced fumble in 16 games and nine starts.

The New York Giants finished second in the NFC East with an 11–5 record and earned a wildcard berth. On January 8, 2017, Kennard appeared in his first career playoff game and made two combined tackles as the Giants lost 38–13 at the Green Bay Packers in the NFC Wildcard Game.

==== 2017 ====
Kennard returned as the starting strongside linebacker in 2017. He started alongside Jonathan Casillas and starting middle linebacker B. J. Goodson. in Week 7, he collected a season-high five combined tackles during a 24–7 loss to the Seattle Seahawks. Kennard was inactive for the Giants' Week 10 loss at the San Francisco 49ers due to a quadriceps injury. On December 4, 2017, the New York Giants fired head coach Ben McAdoo after they began the season with a 2–10 record. Kennard finished the 2017 NFL season with 41 combined tackles (24 solo), four sacks, and two pass deflections in 15 games and 11 starts.

=== Detroit Lions ===
==== 2018 ====
On March 15, 2018, the Detroit Lions signed Kennard to a three-year, $17.25 million contract that includes $8.50 million guaranteed and a signing bonus of $5.25 million.

Kennard entered training camp slated as a starting outside linebacker. Head coach Matt Patricia named Kennard the starting outside linebacker to begin the regular season, alongside Christian Jones and starting middle linebacker Jarrad Davis. On September 9, 2018, Kennard was voted team captain by his teammates.

On September 16, 2018, Kennard recorded four combined tackles and made two sacks on 49ers' quarterback Jimmy Garoppolo during a 30–27 loss at the San Francisco 49ers in Week 2.

==== 2019 ====
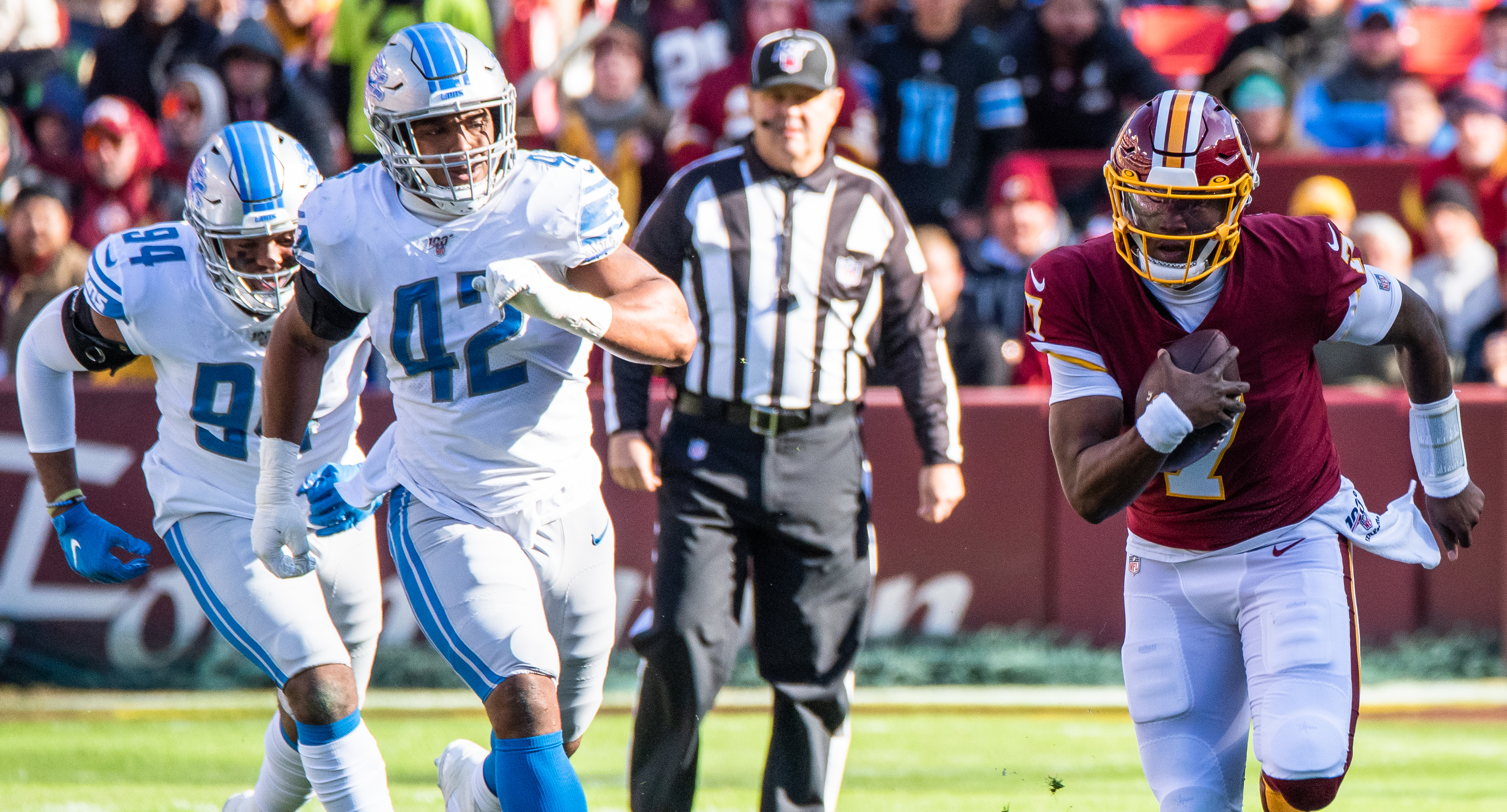
Kennard (#42) in a game against the Washington Redskins

In Week 1 against the Arizona Cardinals, Kennard sacked rookie quarterback Kyler Murray three times in the 27-27 tie. In week 12 against the Washington Redskins, Kennard recorded a strip sack on Dwayne Haskins which was recovered by teammate Tavon Wilson in the 19–16 loss.

On March 17, 2020, Kennard was released by the Lions.

=== Arizona Cardinals ===
On March 21, 2020, Kennard signed a three–year contract with the Arizona Cardinals. In Week 2 against the Washington Football Team, Kennard recorded his first sack of the season during the 30–15 win. He was placed on the reserve/COVID-19 list by the team on November 2, and activated on November 11.

Kennard was voted the NFL Player Association representative by his teammates (NY Giants, Detroit Lions, AZ Cardinals) consecutively from 2016 – 2020. As an NFLPA representative, Kennard works with the NFL and has a voting role. Devon voted on the new collective bargaining agreement that took effect for the 2021 season.

Kennard entered the 2021 season third on the outside linebacker depth chart. He played in 15 games with three starts, recording 24 tackles.

On August 30, 2022, Kennard was released by the Cardinals and re-signed to the practice squad. He was promoted to the active roster on September 20. He was released on October 15.

=== Baltimore Ravens ===
Kennard signed to the Baltimore Ravens' practice squad on October 18, 2022. He was released by the Ravens on December 5.

In October 2023, Kennard announced his retirement from professional football via his LinkedIn page.

== NFL career statistics ==
Legend
**Bold**	Career high

=== Regular season ===
Year	Team	Games		Tackles					Interceptions					Fumbles			
Year	Team	GP	GS	Cmb	Solo	Ast	Sck	TFL	Int	Yds	TD	Lng	PD	FF	FR	Yds	TD
2014	NYG	12	6	43	36	7	4.5	**10**	0	0	0	0	1	**2**	0	0	0
2015	NYG	9	9	58	37	**21**	0.0	2	**1**	0	0	0	**4**	0	0	0	0
2016	NYG	**16**	9	**61**	40	**21**	1.0	4	0	0	0	0	1	1	1	0	0
2017	NYG	15	11	41	24	17	4.0	7	0	0	0	0	2	0	1	0	0
2018	DET	15	**15**	46	30	16	**7.0**	9	0	0	0	0	0	0	1	0	0
2019	DET	**16**	**15**	58	**45**	13	**7.0**	9	0	0	0	0	0	1	**2**	**13**	**1**
2020	ARI	13	4	19	15	4	3.0	5	0	0	0	0	0	0	0	0	0
2021	ARI	15	3	24	15	9	0.0	7	0	0	0	0	2	0	1	0	0
2022	ARI	5	1	3	1	2	0.0	0	0	0	0	0	0	0	0	0	0
2022	BAL	2	1	4	4	0	0.0	1	0	0	0	0	0	0	0	0	0
		118	74	357	247	110	26.5	54	1	0	0	0	10	4	6	13	1

=== Playoffs ===
Year	Team	Games		Tackles					Interceptions					Fumbles			
Year	Team	GP	GS	Cmb	Solo	Ast	Sck	TFL	Int	Yds	TD	Lng	PD	FF	FR	Yds	TD
2016	NYG	**1**	0	**2**	**1**	**1**	0.0	0	0	0	0	0	0	0	0	0	0
2021	ARI	**1**	0	1	**1**	0	0.0	0	0	0	0	0	0	0	0	0	0
		2	0	3	2	1	0.0	0	0	0	0	0	0	0	0	0	0

== Personal life ==
Kennard graduated from the University of Southern California with a bachelor's degree in Communications in the spring of 2012 and a master's degree in Communication Management, with a focus in business management. He completed his undergraduate degree in 3 years, his master's in 1.5 years, and maintained a 3.8 GPA. He maintained the team's highest GPA. Kennard made the 2011 Pac-12 All-Academic second-team and 2010 Pac-10 All-Academic second-team. He and 15 of his USC teammates spent 5 days in Haiti in the spring of 2012 building homes and assisting those in need. He was selected to be one of USC's representatives at the 2011 APPLE (Athletic Prevention Programming and Leadership Education) Conference in Austin, Tex., designed to promote student-athlete health and wellness. Kennard is the son of Derek Kennard, who played in the National Football League with the Arizona Cardinals, the New Orleans Saints and the Dallas Cowboys, helping the latter to win Super Bowl XXX. The elder Kennard, a native of Stockton, California, attended the University of Nevada, Reno.

He is also a real estate investor.
