= Corey Washington =

American football player (born 1991)

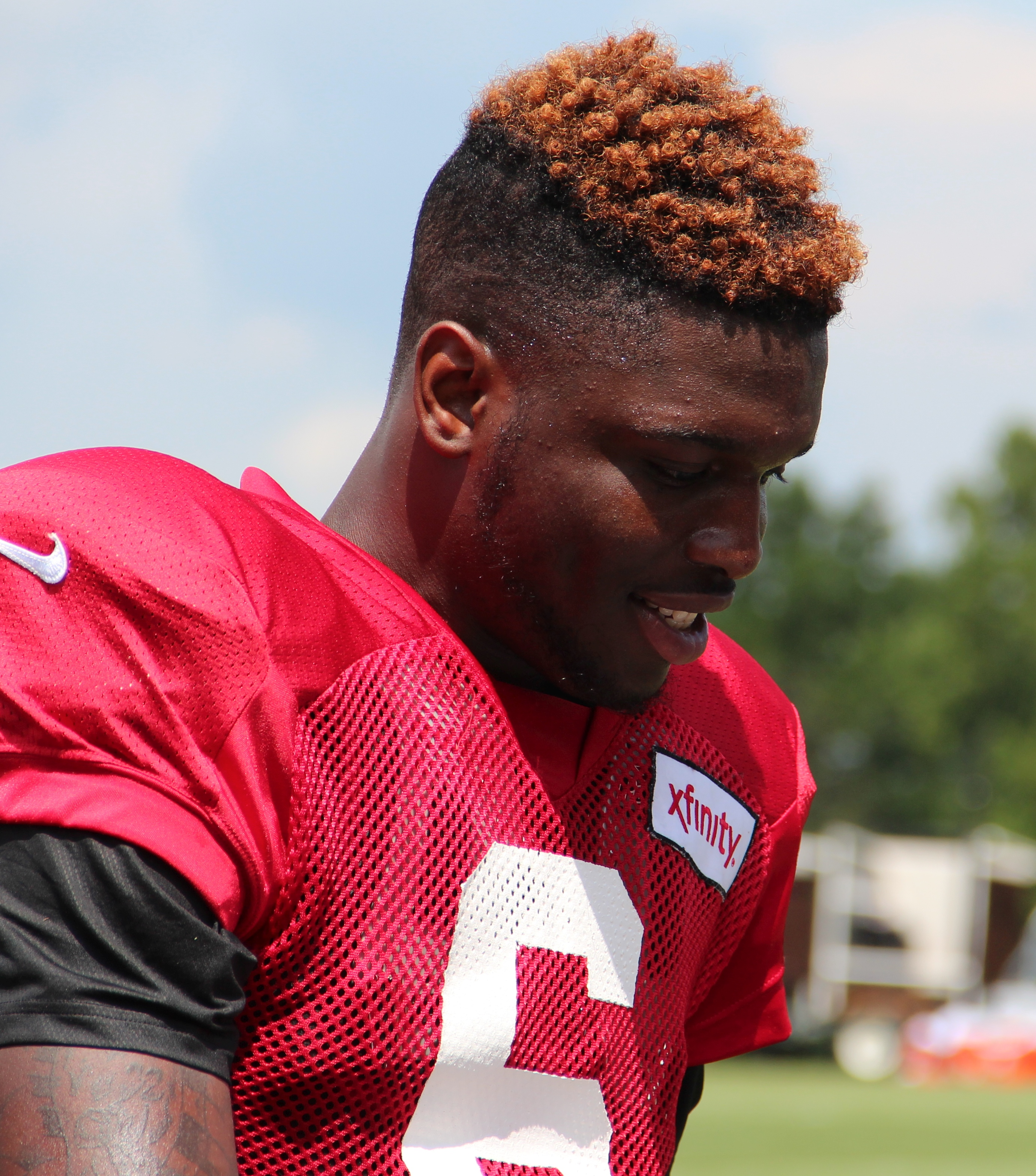
- Washington with Atlanta

No. 80, 88
- Position: Wide receiver

Personal information
- Born: December 29, 1991 (age 34); North Charleston, South Carolina, U.S.
- Listed height: 6 ft 4 in (1.93 m)
- Listed weight: 200 lb (91 kg)

Career information
- High school: North Charleston (SC)
- College: Newberry
- NFL draft: 2014: undrafted

Career history
- Arizona Cardinals (2014)*; New York Giants (2014); Washington Redskins (2015)*; Detroit Lions (2015–2016)*; Atlanta Falcons (2016)*; Buffalo Bills (2016–2017)*; Kansas City Chiefs (2017)*; Dallas Cowboys (2017)*; Winnipeg Blue Bombers (2018)
- * Offseason or practice squad member only

Career NFL statistics
- Receptions: 5
- Receiving yards: 52
- Receiving touchdowns: 1
- Stats at Pro Football Reference

Corey Washington (born December 29, 1991) is an American former professional football player who was a wide receiver in the National Football League (NFL). He played college football for the Newberry Wolves and was signed by the Arizona Cardinals as an undrafted free agent in 2014.

== College career ==
Washington played college football at Georgia Military College for his freshman and sophomore seasons and at Newberry College his junior and senior seasons. During his college career, he had 146 receptions for 2,396 yards and 34 touchdowns.

== Professional career ==
=== Arizona Cardinals ===
Washington signed with the Arizona Cardinals as an undrafted free agent on May 12, 2014 and was waived on May 27.

=== New York Giants ===
Washington was claimed off waivers by the New York Giants on May 29, 2014. During training camp he impressed the Giants coaches and was considered likely to make the teams 53-man roster. Washington made the 53-man roster after finishing preseason as the Giants leading receiver. He caught his first regular season touchdown of his career on November 3, 2014 against the Indianapolis Colts. Washington was waived/injured by the Giants on September 5, 2015. He was released by the team with an injury settlement the following day.

=== Washington Redskins ===
On October 26, 2015, Washington signed to the practice squad of Washington Redskins. He was released by the team on November 9.

=== Detroit Lions ===
On November 18, 2015, Washington was signed to the Lions' practice squad. On January 4, 2016, Washington signed a futures contract with the Detroit Lions. He was waived by the Lions in June 2016 and returned to the reserve list after clearing waivers.

=== Atlanta Falcons ===
On July 27, 2016, Washington was signed by the Falcons. On September 3, 2016, he was waived by the Falcons due to final roster cuts.

=== Buffalo Bills ===
On October 4, 2016, Washington was signed to the Bills' practice squad. He was released by the Bills on October 25, 2016.

On March 17, 2017, Washington re-signed with the Bills. On May 11, 2017, he was waived by the Bills.

=== Kansas City Chiefs ===
On July 31, 2017, Washington signed with the Kansas City Chiefs. He was waived on August 8, 2017.

=== Dallas Cowboys ===
On August 15, 2017, Washington signed with the Dallas Cowboys. He was waived/injured on August 25, 2017 and placed on injured reserve. He was released on August 27, 2017.
