= Daniel Fells =

American football player (born 1983)

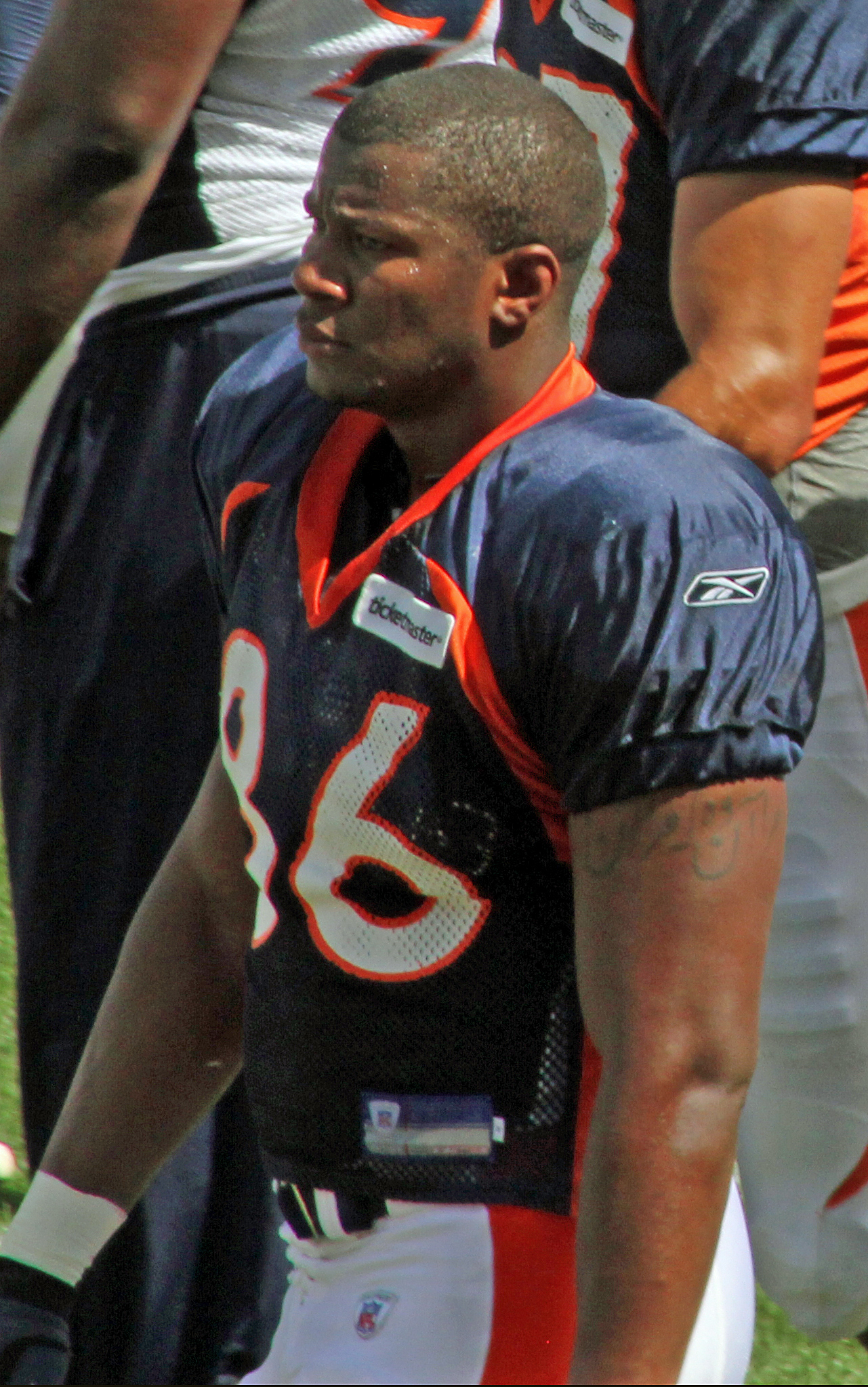
- Fells with the Denver Broncos in 2011

No. 46, 86, 85
- Position: Tight end

Personal information
- Born: September 23, 1983 (age 43); Anaheim, California, U.S.
- Listed height: 6 ft 4 in (1.93 m)
- Listed weight: 260 lb (118 kg)

Career information
- High school: Fullerton Union (Fullerton, California)
- College: UC Davis (2002–2005)
- NFL draft: 2006: undrafted

Career history
- Atlanta Falcons (2006); Oakland Raiders (2007)*; Tampa Bay Buccaneers (2008)*; St. Louis Rams (2008−2010); Denver Broncos (2011); New England Patriots (2012); New York Giants (2014–2015)
- * Offseason or practice squad member only

Awards and highlights
- First-team All-GWFC (2004); Second-team All-GWFC (2005)

Career NFL statistics
- Receptions: 111
- Receiving yards: 1,307
- Receiving touchdowns: 12
- Stats at Pro Football Reference

Daniel Fells (born September 23, 1983) is an American former professional football player who was a tight end in the National Football League (NFL). He played college football for the UC Davis Aggies and was signed by the Atlanta Falcons as an undrafted free agent in 2006.

Fells was also a member of the Oakland Raiders, Tampa Bay Buccaneers, St. Louis Rams, Denver Broncos, New England Patriots, and New York Giants.

== Early life ==
Fells attended Fullerton Union High School. He was an All-Freeway League performer in football, basketball and baseball and was named All-CIF honors in football and was named team's most valuable player. Fells was also All-SoCalHoops D-IIA honorable mention as a senior in basketball. His brother is Darren Fells, who most recently played tight end for the Tampa Bay Buccaneers.

== College career ==
Fells attended University of California, Davis and joined the team as a wide receiver. Following a position change orchestrated by the coaching staff, Fells made the transition to play tight end and, as a senior, was a Second-team All-Great West Football Conference (GWFC) selection with 10 receptions for 165 yards and one touchdown. In 2004, as a junior, he was a First-team All-GWFC, with 35 receptions for 520 yards and one touchdown. As a member of the UC Davis Aggies in 2003, he won team's award as outstanding sophomore. In 2002, he was on the roster but did not play, and he redshirted in 2001.

== Professional career ==
Pre-draft measurables
Height	Weight	40-yard dash	10-yard split	20-yard split	20-yard shuttle	Three-cone drill	Vertical jump	Broad jump	Bench press
6 ft 3 3/8 in (1.91 m)	259 lb (117 kg)	4.95 s	1.71 s	2.86 s	4.46 s	7.27 s	29 1/2 in (0.75 m)	9 ft 0 in (2.74 m)	19 reps
All values from NFL Combine.

=== Atlanta Falcons ===
Fells was originally signed by the Atlanta Falcons as an undrafted free agent in 2006.

=== Oakland Raiders ===
On September 4, 2007, the Oakland Raiders assigned Fells to the practice squad.

=== Tampa Bay Buccaneers ===
On January 1, 2008, Fells signed a Reserve/Future contract with the Tampa Bay Buccaneers.

=== St. Louis Rams ===
In October 2008, Fells signed a free agent contract with the St. Louis Rams. In 2008, he played 12 games with one start and caught seven passes for 81 yards. He was placed on injured reserve on December 21, 2008. In 2009, he came back with 21 catches for 273 yards and three touchdowns. He played in 14 games and started four. Then in 2010, he played in every game and started seven. He had career high in catches, and receiving yards with rookie Sam Bradford.

=== Denver Broncos ===
Fells signed a one-year contract with the Denver Broncos on July 31, 2011.

=== New England Patriots ===
Fells agreed to sign a three-year deal with the New England Patriots on March 19, 2012. On August 30, 2013, Fells was released.

=== New York Giants ===
On January 7, 2014, Fells was signed by the New York Giants. On October 5, 2015, the Giants announced that Fells had been dealing with a chronic ankle condition, which was later discovered to be a staphylococcal infection, a discovery made after he had received a cortisone injection for his ankle injury. The infection was found to be methicillin-resistant Staphylococcus aureus (MRSA), which is resistant to many antibiotics that are used to treat staph infections. Fells had a high fever upon his arrival on October 2, 2015, at the emergency room, where he had been taken by his wife. Due to the staph infection found in his ankle, he was placed on injured reserve. On October 9, 2015, he was moved from the intensive care unit (ICU) to a private room. On July 26, 2016, Fells announced his retirement from the NFL.
