= Marx (surname) =

The surname Marx is a Germanic surname, believed to originate with Mark the Evangelist and the Roman praenomen Marcus, the latter deriving from the god Mars. The similarly-spelled Marks may share etymology with march (territory), especially near Wales, but most British Marxes have Jewish roots, typically in the Rhineland or former Pale of Settlement. Famously, Karl Marx's father, born Herschel HaLevi Mordechai in Saarlouis, assimilated in 1817 or 1818 to Heinrich Marx because Prussia banned Jews from public service; as Karl Marx's grandfather was also known as Levy Marx and his great-great-grandfather as Mordechai Marx, the name was already current in the family. Amateur genealogist Colin Shelley suggests that the name Marx' prevalence there may have arisen as a macaronic acronym for māšīaḥ rex.

== Notable people with the surname ==
=== Politics ===
- Charles Marx (1903–1946), Luxembourgian doctor, political militant and minister
- Karl Marx (1818–1883), 19th-century philosopher
  - Eleanor Marx (1855–1898), politically active daughter of Karl Marx
  - Heinrich Marx (1777–1838), German lawyer and father of Karl Marx
  - Henriette Marx (née Pressburg) (1788–1863), mother of Karl Marx
  - Jenny Marx (1814–1881), a German socialist and the wife of Karl Marx
  - Jenny Marx (1844–1883), activist and the eldest daughter of Karl Marx
  - Laura Marx (1845–1911), daughter of Karl Marx and wife of Paul Lafargue
- Wilhelm Marx (1863–1946), German politician and Chancellor
- Victor Marx, minister and Republican candidate for Governor of Colorado

=== Television and film ===
- Marx Brothers, a team of American sibling comedians that appeared in vaudeville, stage plays, film and television
  - The brothers:
    - Chico Marx (1887–1961), also a musician
    - Harpo Marx (1888–1964), also a musician
    - Groucho Marx (1890–1977)
    - Gummo Marx (1892–1977)
    - Zeppo Marx (1901–1979)
  - Other family members:
    - Arthur Marx (1921–2011), son of Groucho Marx, writer
    - Barbara Marx (1926–2017), wife of Zeppo Marx who later became the final wife of Frank Sinatra
    - Gregg Marx (born 1955), grandson of Milton "Gummo" Marx, great-nephew of Groucho, Harpo, Chico and Zeppo Marx, actor known mainly for his work on daytime soap operas
    - Melinda Marx (born 1946), daughter of Groucho Marx, writer
    - Minnie Marx (1864/5–1929), mother and manager for the Marx Brothers, sister of Al Shean
    - Miriam Marx (1927–2017), daughter of Groucho Marx, writer
    - Sam Marx (1859–1933), father of the Marx Brothers
- Brett Marx (born 1964), American actor
- Carey Marx (born 1966), British comedian
- Christy Marx, TV series writer
- Frederick Marx, film producer, editor, writer and director
- Samuel Marx (born 1955), MGM story editor, film producer, and author
- Sebastian Marx (born 1979), American comedian
- Sue Marx (1930-2023), American documentary film director and producer

=== Music ===
- Adolf Bernhard Marx (1799–1866), musicologue
- Bill Marx (pianist) (born 1937), American pianist, arranger, and composer
- Dick Marx (1924–1997), American pianist and arranger
- Gary Marx (born 1959), rock musician
- Jeff Marx (born 1970), American composer of musicals
- Joseph Marx (1882–1964), Austrian composer
- Karl Marx (composer) (1897–1985), German composer
- Kerry Marx, American guitarist and Music Director of the Grand Ole Opry
- Patricia Marx (singer) (born 1974), Brazilian singer-songwriter
- Richard Marx (born 1963), American pop singer

=== Sports ===
- Daniel Marx (born 1995), American football fullback
- Dimitri Marx (born 1998), Swiss slalom canoeist
- Eric Marx (1895–1974), South African cricketer
- Franz Marx (born 1963), Austrian wrestler
- Greg Marx (1950–2018), American football defensive end
- Jack Marx (bridge) (1907–1991), British bridge player
- Jan-Hendrik Marx (born 1995), German footballer
- Joachim Marx (born 1944), Polish footballer
- Josef Marx (1934–2008), German footballer
- Malcolm Marx (born 1994), South African rugby union player
- Michael Marx (born 1958), American fencer
- Nicolas Marx (born 1974), French footballer
- Robert Marx (fencer) (born 1956), American fencer
- Thorben Marx (born 1981), German footballer
- Travis Marx (born 1977), American mixed martial artist

=== In other fields ===
- Adolph Marx (bishop) (1915–1965), American Roman Catholic bishop
- Anthony Marx (born 1959), President and CEO of New York Public Library
- Bill Marx (born 1937), American theater and arts critic
- Carl Marx (artist) (1911–1991) German artist and Bauhaus student
- Clare Marx (1954–2022), British surgeon
- Daniel Marx (born 1953), Argentine economist
- Ellen Marx (born 1939), German artist and author
- Enid Marx (1902–1998), English painter and designer
- Erwin Otto Marx (1893–1980), German engineer and inventor
- Friedrich Marx (1859–1941), German classical philologist
- Friedrich Marx (author) (1830–1905), Austrian poet and officer
- George Marx (1838–1895), German-born American arachnologist, scientific illustrator, and physician
- Gertie F. Marx (1912-2004), German-born American physician and pioneer of obstetric anaesthesia
- Graciela Gutiérrez Marx (1945–2022), Argentine artist
- György Marx (1927–2002), Hungarian physicist, astrophysicist, science historian, and professor
- Hellmuth Marx (1915–2002), Austrian sculptor
- Herbert Marx (politician) (1932–2020), Canadian lawyer, university law professor, politician, and judge
- Hermann Marx (1881–1947), German-born British stockbroker, banker, and noted print and book collector
- Hymen Marx (1925–2007), American herpetologist
- Jack Marx (20th and 21st centuries), Australian journalist and author
- Karl Marx (medical missionary), German doctor
- Karl Friedrich Heinrich Marx, German physician and lecturer
- Leo Marx (1919–2022), professor at MIT
- Louis Marx (1896–1982), American toy maker and businessman
- Mona Magdeleine Marx; known more commonly by married name Mona Beaumont, French-born American painter, printmaker
- Paul Marx (monk) (1920–2010), American Roman Catholic priest, sociologist, anti-abortion activist, and writer
- Paul John Marx (1935–2018), French Roman Catholic bishop
- Philipp Marx (born 1982), retired German tennis player
- Reinhard Marx (born 1953), Cardinal, Archbishop of Munich and Freising
- Robert F. Marx (1936–2019), American underwater archaeologist
- Roberto Burle Marx (1909–1994), Brazilian landscape designer
- Thierry Marx (born 1962), French chef

=== Other media ===
- Bernard Marx, one of the main characters in the novel Brave New World by Aldous Huxley
- Carlo Marx, character in the novel On the Road by Jack Kerouac
- Skidd McMarxx, minor character in the game Ratchet and Clank, whose name is primarily a play on words (he plays a sport similar to Slalom snowboarding)

== See also ==
- Marcks (disambiguation)
- Marks (disambiguation)
- Marx (disambiguation)
