= Marc (surname) =

Marc is the surname of:

- Alessandra Marc (born 1957), American operatic soprano
- Andrei Marc (born 1993), Romanian footballer
- Franz Marc (1880-1916), German painter and printmaker
- Jeanny Marc (born 1950), a member of the National Assembly of France representing Guadeloupe
- Philip Marc, High Sheriff of Nottinghamshire, Derbyshire and the Royal Forests in 1208, proposed as the model for the Sheriff of Nottingham in the Robin Hood legends
- Robert Marc (artist) (1943–1993), French artist
- Robert Marc (fencer), French fencer in the 1900 Olympics
- Robert E. Marc, American ophthalmologist

== See also ==
- Mark (surname)
