= 2014 Army Black Knights football team =

American college football season

2014 Army Black Knights football
- Conference: Independent
- Record: 4–8
- Head coach: Jeff Monken (1st season)
- Offensive coordinator: Brent Davis (1st season)
- Offensive scheme: Triple option
- Defensive coordinator: Jay Bateman (1st season)
- Base defense: 3–4
- Captains: Geoffery Bacon; Larry Dixon
- Home stadium: Michie Stadium

2014 NCAA Division I FBS independents football records
	Conf.			Overall
Team	W		L	W		L
BYU		–		8	–	5
Notre Dame		–		8	–	5
Navy		–		8	–	5
Army		–		4	–	8
Rankings from AP Poll

The 2014 Army Black Knights football team represented the United States Military Academy as an independent in the 2014 NCAA Division I FBS football season. The Black Knights were led by first-year head coach Jeff Monken and played their home games at Michie Stadium. They finished the season 4–8.

== Schedule ==
Date	Time	Opponent	Site	TV	Result	Attendance
September 6	12:00 p.m.	Buffalo	Michie Stadium; West Point, NY	CBSSN	W 47–39	28,643
September 13	5:00 p.m.	at No. 15 Stanford	Stanford Stadium; Stanford, CA	P12N	L 0–35	49,680
September 20	3:30 p.m.	at Wake Forest	BB&T Field; Winston-Salem, NC	ESPN3	L 21–24	28,123
September 27	12:00 p.m.	at Yale	Yale Bowl; New Haven, CT	FCS	L 43–49 ^{OT}	34,142
October 4	12:00 p.m.	Ball State	Michie Stadium; West Point, NY	CBSSN	W 33–24	31,384
October 11	12:00 p.m.	Rice	Michie Stadium; West Point, NY	CBSSN	L 21–41	37,011
October 18	3:30 p.m.	at Kent State	Dix Stadium; Kent, OH	ESPN3	L 17–39	18,114
November 1	11:30 a.m.	Air Force	Michie Stadium; West Point, NY (Commander-in-Chief's Trophy)	CBS	L 6–23	40,479
November 8	3:30 p.m.	vs. UConn	Yankee Stadium; Bronx, New York, NY	CBSSN	W 35–21	27,453
November 15	12:00 p.m.	at Western Kentucky	Houchens Industries–L. T. Smith Stadium; Bowling, KY	CBSSN	L 24–52	16,819
November 22	12:00 p.m.	No. 7 (FCS) Fordham	Michie Stadium; West Point, NY	CBSSN	W 42–31	33,793
December 13	3:00 p.m.	vs. Navy	M&T Bank Stadium; Baltimore, MD (Army–Navy Game, Commander-in-Chief's Trophy, College GameDay)	CBS	L 10–17	70,935
Rankings from AP Poll released prior to the game; All times are in Eastern time

== Game summaries ==
=== Buffalo ===
Buffalo Bulls at Army Black Knights

Quarter	1	2	3	4	Total
Bulls	3	0	14	22	39
Black Knights	7	14	13	13	47

at Michie Stadium, West Point, New York

- Date: September 6, 2014
- Game time: 12:00 p.m. EDT
- Game weather: Temperature: 83 F • Wind: WSW 7 mph • Weather: Partly cloudy
- Game attendance: 28,643
- Referee: Jeff Flanagan
- TV announcers (CBSSN): Ben Holden (Play-by-play), Kevin O'Connell (color), & Courtney Fallon (sideline)
- ESPN - Army beats Buffalo 47-39 under new coach Monken /// Box Score, Buffalo at Army

Game information

First Quarter

- (10:26) UB FG: Patrick Clarke 22-yard field goal; 9 plays, 43 yards, 3:44
- (04:20) ARMY TD: Larry Dixon 23-yard rush (Daniel Grochowski kick); 11 plays, 75 yards, 6:06

Second Quarter

- (10:41) ARMY TD: Tony Giovannelli 4-yard rush (Daniel Grochowski kick); 7 plays, 80 yards, 4:07
- (00:22) ARMY TD: Raymond Maples 6-yard rush (Daniel Grochowski kick); 2 plays, 8 yards, 0:12

Third Quarter

- (06:04) ARMY TD: Larry Dixon 45-yard rush (Daniel Grochowski kick); 1 play, 45 yards, 0:09
- (04:17) UB TD: Devon Hughes 20-yard pass from Joe Licata (Patrick Clarke kick); 5 plays, 62 yards, 1:40
- (03:30) ARMY TD: Terry Baggett 41-yard rush (Daniel Grochowski kick blocked); 2 plays, 42 yards, 0:42
- (01:54) UB TD: Marcus McGill 65-yard pass from Joe Licata (Patrick Clarke kick); 4 plays, 78 yards, 1:28

Fourth Quarter

- (12:01) ARMY TD: Angel Santiago 4-yard rush (Daniel Grochowski kick blocked); 11 plays, 75 yards, 4:53
- (11:10) ARMY TD: Matt Giachinta 4-yard rush (Cale Brewer kick); 2 plays, 33 yards, 0:33
- (08:47) UB TD: Devin Campbell 15-yard pass from Joe Licata (Patrick Clarke kick); 7 plays, 75 yards, 2:23
- (06:01) UB TD: Marcus McGill 3-yard pass from Joe Licata (Patrick Clarke kick); 8 plays, 47 yards, 2:42
- (02:42) UB TD: Devin Campbell 8-yard pass from Joe Licata (Patrick Clarke kick); 8 plays, 67 yards, 2:21

Passing

- UB – Joe Licata: 35/50, 401 yds, 5 TD, 3 INT
- ARMY – Angel Santiago: 6/6, 96 yds

Rushing

- UB – Anthone Taylor: 16 att, 79 yds
- ARMY – Larry Dixon: 20 att, 174 yds, 2 TD

Receiving

- UB – Marcus McGill: 7 rec, 128 yds, 2 TD
- ARMY – Raymond Maples: 2 rec, 69 yds

=== At Stanford ===
Army Black Knights at #15 Stanford Cardinal

Quarter	1	2	3	4	Total
Black Knights	0	0	0	0	0
No. 15 Cardinal	7	7	7	14	35

at Stanford Stadium, Stanford, California

- Date: September 13, 2014
- Game time: 2:00 p.m. PDT
- Game weather: Temperature: 77 F • Wind: N 10 mph • Weather: Partly cloudy
- Game attendance: 49,680
- Referee: Mark Duddy
- TV announcers (P12N): J.B. Long (Play-by-play), Anthony Herron (color), & Ashley Adamson (sideline)
- ESPN - Stanford rebounds from loss, blanks Army /// Box Score, Army at #15 Stanford

Game information

First Quarter

- (10:44) STAN TD: Devon Cajuste 23-yard pass from Kevin Hogan (Jordan Williamson kick); 9 plays, 75 yards, 4:16

Second Quarter

- (00:27) STAN TD: Devon Cajuste 2-yard pass from Kevin Hogan (Jordan Williamson kick); 4 plays, 15 yards, 1:01

Third Quarter

- (02:51) STAN TD: Devon Cajuste 15-yard pass from Kevin Hogan (Jordan Williamson kick); 9 plays, 98 yards, 3:14

Fourth Quarter

- (11:35) STAN TD: Ty Montgomery 4-yard rush (Jordan Williamson kick); 8 plays, 35 yards, 3:20
- (06:09) STAN TD: Ty Montgomery 32-yard pass from Kevin Hogan (Jordan Williamson kick); 6 plays, 73 yards, 3:05

Passing

- ARMY – Angel Santiago: 2/2, 13 yds
- STAN – Kevin Hogan: 20/28, 216 yds, 4 TD

Rushing

- ARMY – A.J. Schurr: 6 att, 65 yds
- STAN – Barry Sanders: 9 att, 92 yds

Receiving

- ARMY – Edgar Allen Poe: 1 rec, 10 yds
- STAN – Ty Montgomery: 8 rec, 86 yds, 1 TD

=== At Wake Forest ===
Army Black Knights at Wake Forest Demon Deacons

Quarter	1	2	3	4	Total
Black Knights	7	14	0	0	21
Demon Deacons	7	7	0	10	24

at BB&T Field, Winston-Salem, North Carolina

- Date: September 20, 2014
- Game time: 3:30 p.m. EDT
- Game weather: Temperature: 79 F • Wind: N 8 mph • Weather: Mostly sunny
- Game attendance: 28,123
- Referee: Ron Cherry
- TV announcers (ESPN3): Roy Philpott (Play-by-play), George Wrighster (color), & Angela Mallen (sideline)
- ESPN - Wolford rallies Wake Forest over Army 24-21 /// Box Score, Army at Wake Forest

Game information

First Quarter

- (06:00) WF TD: Isaiah Robinson 15-yard rush (Mike Weaver kick); 6 plays, 74 yards, 1:41
- (00:49) ARMY TD: Larry Dixon 5-yard rush (Daniel Grochowski kick); 8 plays, 76 yards, 5:05

Second Quarter

- (13:39) WF TD: Cam Serigne 6-yard pass from John Wolford (Mike Weaver kick); 5 plays, 49 yards, 2:10
- (09:26) ARMY TD: Angel Santiago 1-yard rush (Daniel Grochowski kick); 8 plays, 74 yards, 4:06
- (02:23) ARMY TD: Xavier Moss 4-yard pass from Joe Walker (Daniel Grochowski kick); 9 plays, 68 yards, 4:28

Third Quarter

no scoring

Fourth Quarter

- (14:13) WF FG: Mike Weaver 20-yard field goal; 15 plays, 70 yards, 4:51
- (06:45) WF TD: E.J. Scott 12-yard pass from John Wolford (Mike Weaver kick); 11 plays, 84 yards, 4:13

Passing

- ARMY – Angel Santiago: 2/4, 14 yds
- WF – John Wolford: 25/35, 238 yds, 2 TD, 1 INT

Rushing

- ARMY – Angel Santiago: 22 att, 125 yds, 1 TD
- WF – Isaiah Robinson: 17 att, 60 yds, 1 TD

Receiving

- ARMY – Xavier Moss: 2 rec, 9 yds, 1 TD
- WF – E.J. Scott: 5 rec, 64 yds, 1 TD

=== At Yale ===
Army Black Knights at Yale Bulldogs

Quarter	1	2	3	4	OT	Total
Black Knights	7	14	15	7	0	43
Bulldogs	7	7	22	7	6	49

at Yale Bowl, New Haven, Connecticut

- Date: September 27, 2014
- Game time: 1:00 p.m. EDT
- Game weather: Temperature: 79 F • Wind: N 7 mph • Weather: Clear and Sunny
- Game attendance: 34,142
- Referee: Jeff Gray
- TV announcers (FCS): Eric Frede (Play-by-play), Steve DeOssie (color), & Katie Fitzpatrick (sideline)
- ESPN - Rivalry renewed: Yale knocks off Army in OT /// Box Score, Army at Yale

Game information

First Quarter

- (03:28) ARMY TD: Larry Dixon 3-yard rush (Daniel Grochowski kick); 13 plays, 57 yards, 6:59
- (00:07) YALE TD: Morgan Roberts 13-yard rush (Kyle Cazzetta kick); 11 plays, 65 yards, 3:21

Second Quarter

- (06:06) ARMY TD: Edgar Allen Poe 22-yard pass from A.J. Schurr (Daniel Grochowski kick); 9 plays, 80 yards, 4:20
- (02:14) YALE TD: Tyler Varga 2-yard rush (Kyle Cazzetta kick); 11 plays, 70 yards, 3:47
- (01:12) ARMY TD: A.J. Schurr 43-yard rush (Daniel Grochowski kick); 5 plays, 70 yards, 0:55

Third Quarter

- (13:32) ARMY TD: Jeremy Timpf 45-yard interception return (Daniel Grochowski kick)
- (10:12) YALE TD: Tyler Varga 15-yard rush (Stephen Buric pass from Logan Scott); 10 plays, 75 yards, 3:20
- (08:32) ARMY TD: Angel Santiago 53-yard rush (Kelvin White pass from Angel Santiago); 4 plays, 67 yards, 1:33
- (05:08) YALE TD: Ross Drwal 22-yard pass from Morgan Roberts (Kyle Cazzetta kick); 9 plays, 75 yards, 3:24
- (00:21) YALE TD: Tyler Varga 18-yard rush (Kyle Cazzetta kick); 9 plays, 73 yards, 3:07

Fourth Quarter

- (14:57) ARMY TD: Angel Santiago 1-yard rush (Daniel Grochowski kick); 3 plays, 75 yards, 0:24
- (01:42) YALE TD: Tyler Varga 10-yard rush (Kyle Cazzetta kick); 8 plays, 45 yards, 2:53

Overtime

- YALE TD: Tyler Varga 3-yard rush; 6 plays, 25 yards

Passing

- ARMY – Angel Santiago: 6/8, 117 yds
- YALE – Morgan Roberts: 23/40, 290 yds, 1 TD, 1 INT

Rushing

- ARMY – A.J. Schurr: 15 att, 135 yds, 1 TD
- YALE – Tyler Varga: 28 att, 185 yds, 5 TD

Receiving

- ARMY – Tony Giovannelli: 4 rec, 67 yds
- YALE – Grant Wallace: 6 rec, 101 yds

=== Ball State ===
Ball State Cardinals at Army Black Knights

Quarter	1	2	3	4	Total
Cardinals	7	3	0	14	24
Black Knights	14	6	7	6	33

at Michie Stadium, West Point, New York

- Date: October 4, 2014
- Game time: 12:00 p.m. EDT
- Game weather: Temperature: 63 F • Wind: SE 10 mph • Weather: Showers, overcast
- Game attendance: 31,384
- Referee: David Epperley
- TV announcers (CBSSN): Ben Holden (Play-by-play), Kevin O'Connell (color), & Courtney Fallon (sideline)
- ESPN - Santiago scores late, Army beats Ball State 33-24 /// Box Score, Ball State at Army

Game information

First Quarter

- (11:05) ARMY TD: A.J. Schurr 1-yard rush (Daniel Grochowski kick); 7 plays, 29 yards, 3:15
- (06:44) BALL TD: Jahwan Edwards 56-yard rush (Scott Secor kick); 1 play, 56 yards, 0:13
- (04:13) ARMY TD: A.J. Schurr 1-yard rush (Daniel Grochowski kick); 6 plays, 56 yards, 2:20

Second Quarter

- (09:09) ARMY FG: Daniel Grochowski 43-yard field goal; 7 plays, 18 yards, 3:52
- (02:16) BALL FG: Scott Secor 22-yard field goal; 6 plays, 61 yards, 2:11
- (00:07) ARMY FG: Daniel Grochowski 21-yard field goal; 6 plays, 72 yards, 2:09

Third Quarter

- (03:02) ARMY TD: Aaron Kemper 9-yard rush (Daniel Grochowski kick); 5 plays, 61 yards, 2:39

Fourth Quarter

- (14:53) BALL TD: Jahwan Edwards 6-yard rush (Scott Secor kick); 9 plays 74 yards, 3:00
- (08:35) BALL TD: Dylan Curry 6-yard pass from Ozzie Mann (Scott Secor kick); 9 plays, 71 yards, 4:11
- (03:41) ARMY TD: Angel Santiago 11-yard rush (A.J. Schurr pass failed); 10 plays, 75 yards, 4:54

Passing

- BALL – Ozzie Mann: 18/26, 173 yds, 1 TD, 1 INT
- ARMY – Angel Santiago: 2/3, 48 yds

Rushing

- BALL – Jahwan Edwards: 12 att, 142 yds, 2 TD
- ARMY – Larry Dixon: 28 att, 188 yds

Receiving

- BALL – KeVonn Mabonz: 4 rec, 44 yds
- ARMY – Edgar Allen Poe: 1 rec, 37 yds

=== Rice ===
Rice Owls at Army Black Knights

Quarter	1	2	3	4	Total
Owls	7	17	14	3	41
Black Knights	7	7	7	0	21

at Michie Stadium, West Point, New York

- Date: October 11, 2014
- Game time: 12:00 p.m. EDT
- Game weather: Temperature: 49 F • Wind: NE 5 mph • Weather: Light Rain
- Game attendance: 37,011
- Referee: Gary Patterson
- TV announcers (CBSSN): Ben Holden (Play-by-play), Kevin O'Connell (color), & Courtney Fallon (sideline)
- ESPN - Jackson leads Rice over Army 41-21 /// Box Score, Rice at Army

Game information

First Quarter

- (10:29) RICE TD: Brand Hamilton 2-yard rush (Jame Farrimond kick); 9 plays, 73 yards, 4:31
- (01:34) ARMY TD: Larry Dixon 2-yard rush (Daniel Grochowski kick); 5 plays, 41 yards, 2:34

Second Quarter

- (12:37) RICE TD: Darik Dillard 15-yard rush (Jame Farrimond kick); 9 plays, 67 yards, 3:50
- (07:17) RICE FG: Jame Farrimond 23-yard field goal; 6 plays, 55 yards, 3:03
- (02:18) RICE TD: Mario Hull 5-yard pass from Driphu Jackson (Jame Farrimond kick); 6 plays, 51 yards, 2:45
- (00:10) ARMY TD: Xavier Moss 7-yard pass from Angel Santiago (Daniel Grochowski kick); 9 plays, 75 yards, 2:08

Third Quarter

- (12:30) RICE TD: Jordan Taylor 41-yard pass from Driphu Jackson (Jame Farrimond kick); 1 play, 41 yards, 0:10
- (08:35) ARMY TD: Angel Santiago 24-yard rush (Daniel Grochowski kick); 8 plays, 75 yards, 3:55
- (03:47) RICE TD: Darik Dillard 10-yard pass from Driphu Jackson (Jame Farrimond kick); 8 plays, 62 yards, 4:41

Fourth Quarter

- (06:48) RICE FG: Jame Farrimond 24-yard field goal; 8 plays, 17 yards, 3:19

Passing

- RICE – Driphu Jackson: 15/21, 209 yds, 3 TD
- ARMY – A.J. Schurr: 1/3, 54 yds

Rushing

- RICE – Jowan Davis: 21 att, 77 yds
- ARMY – Angel Santiago: 23 att, 106 yds, 1 TD

Receiving

- RICE – Jordan Taylor: 3 rec, 72 yds, 1 TD
- ARMY – Edgar Allen Poe: 1 rec, 54 yds

=== At Kent State ===
Army Black Knights at Kent State Golden Flashes

Quarter	1	2	3	4	Total
Black Knights	3	7	7	0	17
Golden Flashes	3	10	10	16	39

at Dix Stadium, Kent, Ohio

- Date: October 18, 2014
- Game time: 3:30 p.m. EDT
- Game weather: Temperature: 48 F • Wind: NW 11 mph • Weather: Clouds, some rain
- Game attendance: 18,114
- Referee: Don Willard
- TV announcers (ESPN3): Michael Reghi (Play-by-play) & Je'Rod Cherry (color)
- ESPN - Kent St. keeps Army winless on road, 39-17 /// Box Score, Army at Kent State

Game information

First Quarter

- (11:33) ARMY FG: Daniel Grochowski 32-yard field goal; 8 plays, 23 yards, 3:27
- (05:25) KENT FG: Anthony Melchiori 27-yard field goal; 11 plays, 65 yards, 6:08

Second Quarter

- (12:59) KENT FG: Anthony Melchiori 29-yard field goal; 13 plays, 84 yards, 5:23
- (07:56) ARMY TD: Raymond Maples 2-yard rush (Daniel Grochowski kick); 10 plays, 69 yards, 4:57
- (01:31) KENT TD: Casey Pierce 10-yard pass from Colin Reardon (Anthony Melchiori kick); 6 plays, 43 yards, 1:49

Third Quarter

- (12:52) KENT TD: Chris Humphrey 8-yard pass from Colin Reardon (Anthony Melchiori kick); 2 plays, 8 yards, 0:12
- (09:18) ARMY TD: Tony Giovannelli 8-yard rush (Daniel Grochowski kick); 8 plays, 77 yards, 3:28
- (04:24) KENT FG: Anthony Melchiori 27-yard field goal; 12 plays, 61 yards, 4:48

Fourth Quarter

- (12:12) KENT FG: Anthony Melchiori 32-yard field goal; 8 plays, 70 yards, 3:59
- (06:11) KENT TD: Casey Pierce 5-yard pass from Colin Reardon (Anthony Melchiori kick); 5 plays, 69 yards, 2:34
- (03:57) KENT TD: Colin Reardon 7-yard rush (Anthony Melchiori kick blocked); 3 plays, 37 yards, 1:20

Passing

- ARMY – A.J. Schurr: 2/3, 18 yds
- KENT – Colin Reardon: 27/40, 360 yds, 3 TD, 1 INT

Rushing

- ARMY – Tony Giovannelli: 7 att, 90 yds, 1 TD
- KENT – Colin Reardon: 6 att, 42 yds, 1 TD

Receiving

- ARMY – Xavier Moss: 1 rec, 11 yds
- KENT – James Brooks: 7 rec, 108 yds

=== Air Force ===
Air Force Falcons at Army Black Knights

Quarter	1	2	3	4	Total
Falcons	0	6	10	7	23
Black Knights	3	0	3	0	6

at Michie Stadium, West Point, New York

- Date: November 1, 2014
- Game time: 11:30 a.m. EDT
- Game weather: Temperature: 47 F • Wind: N 16 mph • Weather: Cloudy
- Game attendance: 40,749
- Referee: Rick Loumiet
- TV announcers (CBS): Tom McCarthy (Play-by-play), Adam Archuleta (color), & Lauren Gardner (sideline)
- ESPN - Air Force beats Army 23-6 to win CIC Trophy /// Box Score, Air Force at Army

Game information

First Quarter

- (10:17) ARMY FG: Daniel Grochowski 42-yard field goal; 4 plays, 4 yards, 0:57

Second Quarter

- (10:38) AF FG: Will Conant 38-yard field goal; 8 plays, 19 yards, 4:06
- (05:13) AF FG: Will Conant 26-yard field goal; 9 plays, 59 yards, 3:20

Third Quarter

- (12:45) AF TD: Garret Grffin 54-yard pass from Kale Pearson (Will Conant kick); 3 plays, 65 yards, 0:48
- (09:34) AF FG: Will Conant 50-yard field goal; 5 plays, 37 yards, 1:46
- (02:59) ARMY FG: Daniel Grochowksi 46-yard field goal; 14 plays, 47 yards, 6:35

Fourth Quarter

- (07:05) AF TD: Garret Griffin 2-yard pass from Kale Pearson (Will Conant kick); 11 plays, 79 yards, 6:26

Passing

- AF – Kale Pearson: 8/12, 141 yds, 2 TD, 1 INT
- ARMY – A.J. Schurr: 1/2, 27 yds

Rushing

- AF – Jacobi Owens: 27 att, 118 yds
- ARMY – Angel Santiago: 14 att, 33 yds

Receiving

- AF – Garret Griffin: 2 rec, 56 yds, 2 TD
- ARMY – Tony Giovannelli: 1 rec, 27 yds

=== Vs. UConn ===
UConn Huskies vs. Army Black Knights

Quarter	1	2	3	4	Total
Huskies	0	7	0	14	21
Black Knights	7	7	7	14	35

at Yankee Stadium, Bronx, New York

- Date: November 8, 2014
- Game time: 3:30 p.m. EST
- Game weather: Temperature: 47 F • Wind: SW 9 mph • Weather: Mostly sunny
- Game attendance: 27,453
- Referee: W. Davenport
- TV announcers (CBSSN): Ben Holden (Play-by-play), Kevin O'Connell (color), & Courtney Fallon (sideline)
- ESPN - Army beats UConn 35-21 /// Box Score, UConn vs. Army

Game information

First Quarter

- (01:53) ARMY TD: Angel Santiago 2-yard rush (Daniel Grochowski kick); 16 plays, 89 yards, 8:41

Second Quarter

- (08:39) ARMY TD: Joe Walker 4-yard rush (Daniel Grochowski kick); 11 plays, 85 yards, 5:49
- (00:47) UCONN TD: Chan Whitmer 2-yard rush (Bobby Puyol kick); 6 plays, 58 yards, 1:17

Third Quarter

- (08:04) ARMY TD: Joe Walker 2-yard rush (Daniel Grochowski kick); 12 plays, 79 yards, 6:49

Fourth Quarter

- (12:54) UCONN TD: Sean McQuillan 16-yard pass from Chan Whitmer (Bobby Puyol kick); 12 plays, 81 yards, 5:25
- (04:22) ARMY TD: Angel Santiago 1-yard rush (Daniel Grochowski kick); 9 plays, 52 yards, 5:15
- (02:06) UCONN TD: Noel Thomas 1-yard pass from Chan Whitmer (Bobby Puyol kick); 8 plays, 67 yards, 2:08
- (00:28) ARMY TD: Chris Carnegie 99-yard interception return (Daniel Grochowski kick)

Passing

- UCONN – Chan Whitmer: 19/31, 170 yds, 2 TD, 2 INT
- ARMY – Angel Santiago: 2/3, 38 yds

Rushing

- UCONN – Chan Whitmer: 7 att, 62 yds, 1 TD
- ARMY – Angel Santiago: 25 att, 97 yds, 2 TD

Receiving

- UCONN – Deshon Foxx: 6 rec, 54 yds
- ARMY – Joe Walker: 2 rec, 38 yds

=== At WKU ===
Army Black Knights at Western Kentucky Hilltoppers

Quarter	1	2	3	4	Total
Black Knights	7	3	14	0	24
Hilltoppers	14	10	14	14	52

at L.T. Smith Stadium, Bowling Green, Kentucky

- Date: November 15, 2014
- Game time: 12:00 p.m. EST
- Game weather: Temperature: 37 F • Wind: E 8 mph • Weather: Sunny and Cold
- Game attendance: 16,819
- Referee: Steve LaMantia
- TV announcers (CBSSN): Ben Holden (Play-by-play), Kevin O'Connell (color), & Courtney Fallon (sideline)
- ESPN - Western Kentucky rushes past Army 52-24 /// Box Score, Army at Kent State

Game information

First Quarter

- (08:10) ARMY TD: Angel Santiago 1-yard rush (Daniel Grochowski kick); 12 plays, 64 yards, 5:47
- (05:41) WKU TD: Leon Allen 12-yard rush (Garrett Schwettman kick); 8 plays, 68 yards, 2:22
- (01:18) WKU TD: Brandon Doughty 15-yard rush (Garrett Schwettman kick); 3 plays, 19 yards, 0:55

Second Quarter

- (11:59) ARMY FG: Daniel Grochowski 43-yard field goal; 10 plays, 51 yards, 4:14
- (08:49) WKU FG: Garrett Schwettman 36-yard field goal; 8 plays, 53 yards, 3:02
- (00:00) WKU TD: Willie McNeal 45-yard pass from Brandon Doughty (Garrett Schwettman kick); 7 plays, 80 yards, 1:43

Third Quarter

- (11:49) WKU TD: Leon Allen 80-yard rush (Garrett Schwettman kick); 1 play, 80 yards, 0:12
- (03:59) ARMY TD: Angel Santiago 54-yard rush (Daniel Grochowski kick); 2 plays, 59 yards, 0:41
- (00:47) WKU TD: Jared Dangerfield 6-yard pass from Brandon Doughty (Garrett Schwettman kick); 7 plays, 69 yards, 3:04
- (00:26) ARMY TD: Larry Dixon 58-yard rush (Daniel Grochowski kick); 1 play, 58 yards, 0:12

Fourth Quarter

- (14:15) WKU TD: Leon Allen 1-yard rush (Garrett Schwettman kick); 4 plays, 62 yards, 1:03
- (10:24) WKU TD: Nicholas Norris 9-yard pass from Brandon Doughty (Garrett Schwettman kick); 6 plays, 29 yards, 3:47

Passing

- ARMY – Angel Santiago: 3/6, 40 yds
- WKU – Brandon Doughty: 16/25, 178 yds, 3 TD

Rushing

- ARMY – Larry Dixon: 15 att, 131 yds, 1 TD
- WKU – Leon Allen: 33 att, 345 yds, 3 TD

Receiving

- ARMY – Edgar Allen Poe: 2 rec, 26 yds
- WKU – Jared Dangerfield: 7 rec, 73 yds, 1 TD

=== Fordham ===
Fordham Rams at Army Black Knights

Quarter	1	2	3	4	Total
Rams	3	7	0	21	31
Black Knights	0	14	7	21	42

at Michie Stadium, West Point, New York

- Date: November 22, 2014
- Game time: 12:00 p.m. EST
- Game weather: Temperature: 36 F • Wind: W 5 mph • Weather: Mostly sunny
- Game attendance: 33,793
- Referee: Stuart Mullins
- TV announcers (CBSSN): Ben Holden (Play-by-play), Kevin O'Connell (color), & Courtney Fallon (sideline)
- ESPN - Blocked punt helps Army beat Fordham 42-31 /// Box Score, Fordham at Army

Game information

First Quarter

- (12:12) FORDHAM FG: Michae Marando 40-yard field goal; 7 plays, 47 yards, 2:48

Second Quarter

- (11:31) FORDHAM TD: Marc DeSisto 29-yard pass from Joseph Pavlik (Michae Marando kick); 15 plays, 80 yards, 6:13
- (09:20) ARMY TD: Terry Baggett 6-yard rush (Daniel Grochowski kick); 5 plays, 75 yards, 2:11
- (00:05) ARMY TD: Lamar Johnson-Harris 0-yard blocked punt return (Daniel Grochowski kick)

Third Quarter

- (11:09) ARMY TD: Larry Dixon 5-yard rush (Daniel Grochowski kick); 8 plays, 65 yards, 3:45

Fourth Quarter

- (13:07) ARMY TD: Larry Dixon 1-yard rush (Daniel Grochowski kick); 20 plays, 84 yards, 11:13
- (12:54) FORDHAM TD: Brian Wetzel 65-yard pass from Mike Nebrich (Michae Marando kick); 1 play, 65 yards, 0:13
- (06:42) ARMY TD: Larry Dixon 30-yard rush (Daniel Grochowski kick); 10 plays, 75 yards, 6:08
- (05:18) FORDHAM TD: Tebucky Jones 8-yard pass from Mike Nebrich (Michae Marando kick); 4 plays, 68 yards, 1:18
- (02:55) ARMY TD: Raymond Maples 1-yard rush (Daniel Grochowski kick); 6 plays, 38 yards, 2:20
- (00:15) FORDHAM TD: Ada Malkiewicz 51-yard pass from Mike Nebrich (Michae Marando kick); 7 plays, 80 yards, 2:05

Passing

- FORDHAM – Mike Nebrich: 27/38, 352 yds, 3 TD, 1 INT
- ARMY – Angel Santiago: 2/4, 48 yds

Rushing

- FORDHAM – Chase Edmonds: 13 att, 69 yds
- ARMY – Larry Dixon: 22 att, 158 yds, 3 TD

Receiving

- FORDHAM – Brian Wetzel: 12 rec, 193 yds, 1 TD
- ARMY – Kelvin White: 1 rec, 43 yds

=== Vs. Navy ===
Army Black Knights vs. Navy Midshipmen (115th Army-Navy Game)

Quarter	1	2	3	4	Total
Midshipmen	0	7	3	7	17
Black Knights	7	0	0	3	10

at M&T Bank Stadium, Baltimore, Maryland

- Date: December 13, 2014
- Game time: 3:00 p.m. EST
- Game weather: Temperature: 42 F • Wind: NW 5-10 mph • Weather: Partly sunny
- Game attendance: 70,935
- Referee: Riley Johnson
- TV announcers (CBS): Verne Lundquist (Play-by-play), Gary Danielson (color), & Allie LaForce (sideline)
- ESPN - Navy claims 13th straight against rival Army /// Box Score, Army vs Navy (115th Army-Navy Game)

Game information

First Quarter

- (09:36) ARMY TD: Xavier Moss 7-yard blocked punt return (Daniel Grochowski kick)

Second Quarter

- (00:18) NAVY TD: Jamir Tillman 9-yard pass from Keenan Reynolds (Austin Grebe kick); 6 plays, 70 yards, 1:53

Third Quarter

- (09:43) NAVY FG: Austin Grebe 45-yard field goal; 9 plays, 22 yards, 5:17

Fourth Quarter

- (12:07) NAVY TD: Keenan Reynolds 1-yard rush (Austin Grebe kick); 15 plays, 69 yards, 7:49
- (01:51) ARMY FG: Daniel Grochowski 52-yard field goal; 9 plays, 45 yards, 1:56

Passing

- NAVY – Keenan Reynolds: 6/8, 77 yds, 1 TD
- ARMY – A.J. Schurr: 1/3, 20 yds

Rushing

- NAVY – Keenan Reynolds: 26 att, 100 yds, 1 TD
- ARMY – Larry Dixon: 14 att, 90 yds

Receiving

- NAVY – Jamir Tillman: 2 rec, 48 yds, 1 TD
- ARMY – Larry Dixon: 1 rec, 20 yds
