= Harry G. Sperling =

American psychologist (1924–2023)

- Born: August 26, 1924; New York City, New York, U.S.
- Died: July 29, 2023 (aged 98); Northbrook, Illinois, U.S.
- Education: University of Pennsylvania; The New School for Social Research; Columbia University
- Known for: threshold spectral sensitivity; intense light effects; chromatic map of cones in the retina
- Awards: Award of Merit in Retina Research (1982); International Color Vision Society Verriest Medal (1991)
- Scientific career
- Fields: Experimental psychology, Neuroscience
- Workplaces: Naval Submarine Medical Research Laboratory; Honeywell; University of Texas at Houston
- Thesis: Some comparisons among spectral sensitivity data obtained in different retinal locations and with two sizes of foveal stimulus (1953)
- Doctoral advisor: Clarence Graham
- Notable students: Robert E. Marc

Harry George Sperling (August 26, 1924 – July 29, 2023) was an American psychologist. He worked on the visual perception of colour and the physiological basis of colour vision in humans and monkeys. Sperling took a systems approach to understand how colour is processed in the retina. He applied his basic research to characterization of colour blindness and to intense light effects.

== Early life and education ==
Harry George Sperling was born on August 26, 1924. He graduated from the Horace Mann School in 1941. He was awarded a B.A. in Psychology from the University of Pennsylvania in 1944 and an M.A. in Social Psychology from The New School for Social Research in 1946 under the supervision of Solomon Asch. Sperling's Masters research experiment about propaganda (how far can a naive subject's judgment be influenced by a stooge) is described in Asch's 1952 book Social Psychology. He graduated in 1953 with a Ph.D. in Experimental Psychology from Columbia University, under the supervision of Clarence Graham. Sperling's Ph.D. research involved measurements of spectral sensitivity of human subjects and set the stage for his lifelong goal of modeling how the retina processes colour through opponent interactions.

== Career ==
Sperling was hired by the Naval Submarine Medical Research Laboratory in New London, Connecticut. During his tenure there from 1948 to 1959, he worked with Commander Dean Farnsworth detecting and classifying the characteristics of different types of colour blindness. Sperling was given leave to fulfill his Ph.D. requirements at Columbia University during this period.

Sperling worked in St Paul Minnesota for Honeywell Inc. 1959–1966. He developed experimental protocols to obtain threshold spectral sensitivity data from rhesus monkeys using operant conditioning techniques, finding strong similarity with data from humans.

In 1967, Sperling was appointed professor at the University of Texas Medical Center in Houston, where he remained until retirement in 1995. In Houston, he acquired data to pursue the model of opponent interactions that can explain primate spectral sensitivity. He investigated intense light effects on rhesus monkeys that involved experimental color-blinding, spectral sensitivity measurements and ultrastructure of the retina. With graduate student Robert E. Marc, he pioneered chromatic mapping of retinal photoreceptors (retinal cones) using a vital stain. Combining spectral sensitivity data with electroretinography that measures electrical activity of different retinal cell types, he was by the end of his career convinced that all colour processing is completed in the retina.

== Death ==
Harry G. Sperling died in Northbrook, Illinois on July 29, 2023, at the age of 98.

== Awards and honors ==
In 1982, Sperling was given the Award of Merit in Retina Research by the Retina Research Foundation.
In 1991, he was awarded the International Colour Vision Society Verriest Medal.

Sperling was appointed to the National Advisory Eye Council of the National Eye Institute (1975-1979).

== Selected publications ==
- Sperling HG, Hsia Y. Some comparisons among spectral sensitivity data obtained in different retinal locations and with two sizes of foveal stimulus. J Opt Soc Am. 1957 Aug;47(8):707-13. doi: 10.1364/josa.47.000707. PMID: pubmed.
- Sidley NA, Sperling HG, Bedarf EW, Hiss RH. Photopic spectral sensitivity in the monkey: methods for determining, and initial results. Science. 1965 Dec 31;150(3705):1837-9. doi: 10.1126/science.150.3705.1837. PMID: pubmed.
- Sperling HG, Harwerth RS. Red-green cone interactions in the increment-threshold spectral sensitivity of primates. Science. 1971 Apr 9;172(3979):180-4. doi: 10.1126/science.172.3979.180. PMID: pubmed.
- Harwerth RS, Sperling HG. Effects of intense visible radiation on the increment-threshold spectral sensitivity of the rhesus monkey eye. Vision Res. 1975 Nov;15(11):1193-204. doi: 10.1016/0042-6989(75)90162-5. PMID: pubmed.
- Marc RE, Sperling HG. Color receptor identities of goldfish cones. Science. 1976 Feb 6;191(4226):487-9. doi: 10.1126/science.1246634. PMID: pubmed.
- Marc RE, Sperling HG. Chromatic organization of primate cones. Science. 1977 Apr 22;196(4288):454-6. doi: 10.1126/science.403607. PMID: pubmed.
- Boycott BB, Hopkins JM, Sperling HG. Cone connections of the horizontal cells of the rhesus monkey's retina. Proc R Soc Lond B Biol Sci. 1987 Jan 22;229(1257):345-79. doi: 10.1098/rspb.1987.0001. PMID: pubmed.
- Sperling HG, Mills SL. Red-green interactions in the spectral sensitivity of primates as derived from ERG and behavioral data. Vis Neurosci. 1991 Jul-Aug;7(1-2):75-86. doi: 10.1017/s0952523800010956. PMID: pubmed.
