= Marks =

Marks may refer to:

== Business ==
- Mark's, a Canadian retail chain
- Marks & Spencer, a British retail chain
- Collective trade marks, trademarks owned by an organisation for the benefit of its members
- Marks & Co, the inspiration for the novel 84 Charing Cross Road

== Places ==
- Marks, Michigan
- Marks, Mississippi
  - Marks station, an Amtrak train station in Marks, Mississippi
- Marks, Russia

== Other uses ==
- Marks (surname)
- Grade, a teacher's evaluation of a student's performance
- Marks (manor house), a manor house in London, England

== See also ==
- Mark (disambiguation)
- Marcks (disambiguation)
- Marx (disambiguation)
