= Marks (surname) =

Marks is a surname originating from Cornwall and Devon, and also a German or Jewish name. Individuals with this surname include:

- Adolf Marks (1838–1904), Russian publisher
- Alfred Marks (1921–1996), British comic actor and comedian
- Amelia Marks (2011-present), British woman
- Ann Marks (1941–2016), British physicist and science communicator
- Bob Marks (born 1932), American politician
- Bruce Marks (politician) (born 1957), American politician
- Bryony Marks (born c.1971), Australian screen composer
- C. Hardaway Marks (1920–2004), American politician
- Caren Marks (born 1963), German politician
- Caroline Marks (born 2002), American professional surfer
- David Marks (disambiguation)
- Dennis Marks (screenwriter), (1932–2006), American television writer in animation including Batfink and The Beatles
- Elias Marks (1790–1886), American physician and educator
- Gloria Marks (1923–20??), All-American Girls Professional Baseball League player
- Harry Marks (disambiguation)
- Heather Marks (born 1988), Canadian model
- Howard Marks (1945–2016), British drug dealer and author
- Howard Marks (investor) (born 1946), one of the founders of private equity firm Oaktree Capital Management
- Jack Marks (ice hockey) (1882–1945), Canadian professional ice hockey player
- Joel Marks, American academic
- John Marks (disambiguation), multiple people
- Jon Marks (1947–2007), British jazz pianist
- Jonathan Marks, Baron Marks of Henley-on-Thames (born 1952), British barrister and Liberal Democrat peer
- Jonathan M. Marks (born 1955), American biological anthropologist at the University of North Carolina at Charlotte
- Justin Marks (born 1981), American race car driver
- Kenny Marks (1950–2018), American singer
- Laurence Marks (British writer) (born 1948) British TV writer who usually wrote with Maurice Gran, mainly known for sitcoms such as The New Statesman and Birds of a Feather
- Laurence Marks (American writer) (1915–1993), American writer for radio and television shows including M*A*S*H
- Laurence Marks (journalist), (1928–1996), British journalist who wrote for many years for The Observer and The Sunday Times
- Laurence D. Marks (born 1954), American professor of materials science and engineering
- Laurie J. Marks (born 1957), American fantasy writer
- Leo Marks (1920–2001), British cryptographer and writer
- Louis Marks (1928–2010), British television writer and script editor
- Luba Marks, American fashion designer of French-Russian descent, former ballet dancer
- Marc L. Marks (1927–2018), American politician and lawyer
- Martin A. Marks (1853–1916), American businessman
- Meredith Marks (born 1971), American television personality
- Michael Marks (1859–1907), retailer, co-founder of the retail chain Marks & Spencer
- Milton Marks (1920–1998), American politician
- Morris Lyon Marks (1824–1893) politician in South Australia
- Ryan Marks, American men's college basketball coach
- Sammy Marks, Lithuanian-born South African industrialist and financier
- Stuart Marks, Baron Marks of Hale, British businessman and politician
- Sutton Marks (1928–2025), American businessman and politician from Mississippi
- Vic Marks (born 1955), Somerset and England cricketer and sports writer
- Wally Marks (1905–1992), American college sports coach, administrator, and university instructor
- Walter Marks (composer) (born 1934), American songwriter, playwright, screenwriter, and novelist
- Woody Marks (born 2000), American football player

== See also ==
- Marks rule
- Marck
- Marcks
- Mark (surname)
- Marx (surname)
- Marx (disambiguation)
