= Warken =

Warken may refer to:

== People ==
- Adílson Warken (born 1987), Brazilian footballer
- Gerd Warken (born 1951), German footballer
- Nina Warken (born 1979), German lawyer and politician

== Places ==
- Warken, Luxembourg, a town
- Warken, Netherlands, a town in Gelderland
