= Marcks =

Marcks is a surname. Notable people with the surname include:

- Erich Marcks (1891–1944), German general
- Gerhard Marcks (1889–1981), German sculptor
- Greg Marcks (born 1976), American director, writer and actor
- Megan Marcks (born 1972), Australian rower
- Werner Marcks (1896–1967), German general

== See also ==
- 10778 Marcks, a main-belt asteroid
- Marks (disambiguation)
- Marks (surname)
- Marx (disambiguation)
- Marx (surname)
