= 2014 Stanford Cardinal football team =

American college football season

2014 Stanford Cardinal football

Foster Farms Bowl champion

Foster Farms Bowl, W 45–21 vs. Maryland
- Conference: Pac-12 Conference
- North Division
- Record: 8–5 (5–4 Pac-12)
- Head coach: David Shaw (4th season)
- Offensive coordinator: Mike Bloomgren (2nd season)
- Offensive scheme: Multiple
- Defensive coordinator: Lance Anderson (1st season)
- Base defense: 3–4
- Home stadium: Stanford Stadium

2014 Pac-12 Conference football standings
	Conf.			Overall
Team	W		L	W		L
North Division
No. 2 Oregon xy$^	8	–	1	13	–	2
Stanford	5	–	4	8	–	5
Washington	4	–	5	8	–	6
California	3	–	6	5	–	7
Oregon State	2	–	7	5	–	7
Washington State	2	–	7	3	–	9
South Division
No. 19 Arizona xy	7	–	2	10	–	4
No. 10 UCLA	6	–	3	10	–	3
No. 12 Arizona State	6	–	3	10	–	3
No. 20 USC	6	–	3	9	–	4
No. 21 Utah	5	–	4	9	–	4
Colorado	0	–	9	2	–	10
Championship: Oregon 51, Arizona 13
^ – College Football Playoff participant; $ – Conference champion; x – Division champion/co-champions; y – Championship game participant; Rankings from AP Poll

The 2014 Stanford Cardinal football team represented Stanford University in the 2014 NCAA Division I FBS football season. The Cardinal were led by fourth-year head coach David Shaw. They played their home games at Stanford Stadium and were members of the North Division of the Pac-12 Conference. They finished the season with an overall record of 8–5, and a 5–4 in Pac-12 play, placing second place in the North Division. They were invited to the Foster Farms Bowl, where they defeated Maryland.

== 2014 recruiting class ==
- Casey Tucker (#5 OT, Chandler, AZ, Hamilton High School, 6'6", 290)
- Keller Chryst (#3 QB-PP, Palo Alto, CA, Palo Alto High School, 6'4", 234)
- Dalton Schultz (#1 TE-Y, South Jordan, UT, Bingham High School, 6'6", 235)
- Christian McCaffrey (#26 ATH, Highlands Ranch, CO, Valor Christian High School, 6'0" ,195)
- Brandon Simmons (#14 S, Arlington, TX, Mansfield Timberview High School, 6'1", 182)
- Joey Alfieri (#34 OLB, Portland, OR, Jesuit High School, 6'2", 230)
- Jordan Perez (#36 OLB, Carlsbad, CA, Carlsbad High School, 6'1", 210)
- Bobby Okereke (#51 ATH, Tustin, CA, Foothill High School, 6'1", 213)
- Alijah Holder (#45 S, Oceanside, CA, Oceanside High School, 6'1", 165)
- Austin Hall (#40 OG, Phoenix, AZ, Brophy Prep, 6'5", 295)
- Daniel Marx (#3 FB, Mission Viejo, CA, Mission Viejo High School, 6'3", 238)
- Harrison Phillips (#77 DE, Omaha, NE, Millard West High School, 6'4", 240)
- Denzel Franklin (#63 S, Atlanta, GA, Pace Academy, 6'0", 182)
- Lane Veach (#100 OLB, Chandler, AZ, Perry High School, 6'5", 220)
- Isaiah Brandt-Sims (#120 RB, Wenatchee, WA, Wenatchee High School, 5'11", 185)
- Uriah Leiataua (#104 DE, Compton, CA, Dominguez High School, 6'3", 232)
- Alameen Murphy (#108 S, Fort Washington, MD, Friendly High School, 5'10", 182)

== Personnel ==
=== Coaching staff ===
- David Shaw – Head coach (Bradford M. Freeman director of football)
- Lance Anderson – Defensive coordinator (Willie Shaw director of defense)
- Mike Bloomgren – Offensive coordinator/offensive line (Andrew Luck director of offense), associate head coach
- Pete Alamar – Special teams coordinator
- Duane Akina – Defensive backs
- Tavita Pritchard – Quarterbacks/wide receivers/recruiting coordinator
- Randy Hart – Defensive line
- Peter Hansen – Inside linebackers
- Lance Taylor – Running backs
- Morgan turner – Tight ends
- Jarrett huk – Defensive assistant
- Derek Belch – Special teams graduate assistant
- Greg mangan – Defensive graduate assistant
- Marc mattioli – Defensive graduate assistant
- Joseph ashfield – Offensive assistant
- Tsuyoshi kawata – Offensive assistant
- Timot lamarre – Offensive assistant
- Ron Lynn – Director of player development
- Shannon turley – Kissick family director of football sports performance
- Steve bartlinski – Head football athletic trainer
- Brad Idzik – Graduate assistant

=== Roster ===
2014 Stanford Cardinal roster
Quarterbacks: 5 Evan Crower – (redshirt) Junior; 8 Kevin Hogan – (redshirt) Junior; 10 Keller Chryst – Freshman; 17 Ryan Burns – (redshirt) Freshman; Running backs: 22 Remound Wright – (redshirt) Junior; 26 Barry J. Sanders – (redshirt) Sophomore; 27 Christian McCaffrey - Freshman; 30 Ricky Seale – (redshirt) Senior; 39 Kelsey Young – (redshirt) Junior; 42 Pat McFadden – Sophomore; Fullbacks: 24 Patrick Skov – (redshirt) Sophomore; 35 Daniel Marx – Freshman; 36 Lee Ward – (redshirt) Junior; 82 Chris Harrell – (redshirt) Sophomore; 96 Eddie Plantaric – (redshirt) Senior; Wide receivers: 3 Michael Rector – (redshirt) Sophomore; 4 Francis Owusu – Sophomore; 7 Ty Montgomery – Senior; 11 Dontonio Jordan – (redshirt) Sophomore; 13 Rollins Stallworth – (redshirt) Junior; 18 Jeff Trojan – (redshirt) Senior; 21 Isaiah Brandt-Sims – Freshman WR/RB; 38 Gautam Krishnamurthi – (redshirt) Junior; 41 Addison Johnson - Freshman; 81 Conner Crane – (redshirt) Sophomore; 87 Jordan Pratt – (redshirt) Junior; 89 Devon Cajuste – (redshirt) Junior; Offensive Guards/Offensive tackles: 51 Joshua Garnett – Junior OG; 57 Johnny Caspers – (redshirt) Sophomore OG; 60 Lucas Hinds – (redshirt) Freshman OG; 66 Nick Davidson – (redshirt) Sophomore OT; 70 Andrus Peat – Junior OT; 71 Brandon Fanaika - Freshman OG; 75 A. T. Hall – Freshman OT; 76 Reilly Gibbons - Freshman OT; 77 Casey Tucker – Freshman OT; 78 Kyle Murphy – Junior OT; 93 Brendon Austin – (redshirt) Junior OG; 98 David Bright – Freshman OG/OT	Tight ends: 9 Dalton Schultz – Freshman; 80 Eric Cotton – (redshirt) Freshman; 84 Austin Hooper – (redshirt) Freshman; 86 Charlie Hopkins – (redshirt) Junior; 88 Greg Taboada – (redshirt) Freshman; Centers: 52 Graham Shuler – (redshirt) Sophomore; 63 Kevin Reihner – (redshirt) Junior; 73 Jesse Burkett - Freshman; 79 Thomas Oser – (redshirt) Sophomore; Defensive tackles: 58 David Parry– (redshirt) Senior; 79 Alex Yazdi – (redshirt) Junior; 95 Lance Callihan – (redshirt) Junior; Defensive ends: 7 Aziz Shittu – Junior; 43 Blake Lueders – (redshirt) Senior; 55 Nate Lohn – (redshirt) Sophomore; 66 Harrison Phillips – Freshman; 72 J.B. Salem – (redshirt) Junior; 75 Jordan Watkins – (redshirt) Freshman; 90 Solomon Thomas - Freshman; 91 Henry Anderson – (redshirt) Senior; 97 Anthony Hayes – (redshirt) Junior; 99 Luke Kaumatule – Junior; Linebackers: 3 Noor Davis – (redshirt) Sophomore ILB; 4 Blake Martinez – Junior ILB; 9 James Vaughters – Senior OLB; 15 Jordan Perez – Freshman ILB; 17 A. J. Tarpley – (redshirt) Senior ILB; 20 Bobby Okereke - Freshman ILB; 32 Joey Alfieri – Freshman OLB; 33 Mike Tyler – (redshirt) Freshman OLB; 34 Peter Kalambayi – (redshirt) Freshman OLB; 40 Joe Hemschoot – (redshirt) Senior OLB; 44 Kevin Palma – (redshirt) Freshman ILB; 47 Sam Yules – (redshirt) Sophomore ILB; 48 Kevin Anderson – (redshirt) Junior OLB; 50 Sam Shober – (redshirt) Sophomore OLB; 53 Torsten Rotto – (redshirt) Junior OLB; 59 Craig Jones – (redshirt) Sophomore ILB; 86 Lane Veach – Freshman OLB	Defensive backs: 2 Wayne Lyons – Senior CB; 6 Taijuan Thomas – (redshirt) Freshman CB; 11 Terrence Alexander - Freshman CB; 21 Ronnie Harris – (redshirt) Junior CB; 23 Alameen Murphy - Freshman CB; 25 Alex Carter – Junior CB; 31 Alijah Holder – Freshman CB; 38 Ra'Chard Pippens – (redshirt) Junior CB; 46 Ryan Gaertner – (redshirt) Freshman CB; Safeties: 5 Kodi Whitfield – Junior SS; 8 Jordan Richards – Senior SS; 10 Zach Hoffpauir – Junior SS; 19 Brandon Simmons – Freshman DB; 22 Kyle Olugbode – (redshirt) Senior FS; 28 Denzel Franklin – Freshman SS; 29 Dallas Lloyd – (redshirt) Sophomore SS; 44 John Flacco – (redshirt) Senior FS; 45 Calvin Chandler – (redshirt) Freshman SS; Punters/Kickers: 14 Ben Rhyne – (redshirt) Senior P; 19 Jordan Williamson – (redshirt) Senior K; 34 Conrad Ukropina – (redshirt) Sophomore P/K; 47 Alex Robinson – (redshirt) Freshman P; Long snappers: 62 Austin Tubbs – (redshirt) Junior; 67 Reed Miller – Junior; 68 C.J. Keller - Freshman; 69 Jim Grace – (redshirt) Freshman; Terms: Freshman – A player in his first year.; Sophomore – A player in his second year.; Junior – A player in his third year.; Senior – A player in his fourth year.; Redshirt – A player who sat out a previous season.
Source: 2014 Stanford Cardinal Football Roster

== Schedule ==
Date	Time	Opponent	Rank	Site	TV	Result	Attendance
August 30	1:00 p.m.	UC Davis*	No. 11	Stanford Stadium; Stanford, CA	P12N	W 45–0	49,509
September 6	12:30 p.m.	No. 14 USC	No. 13	Stanford Stadium; Stanford, CA (rivalry)	ABC	L 10–13	50,814
September 13	2:00 p.m.	Army*	No. 15	Stanford Stadium; Stanford, CA	P12N	W 35–0	49,680
September 27	1:15 p.m.	at Washington	No. 16	Husky Stadium; Seattle, WA	FOX	W 20–13	66,512
October 4	12:30 p.m.	at No. 9 Notre Dame*	No. 14	Notre Dame Stadium; Notre Dame, IN (Legends Trophy)	NBC	L 14–17	80,795
October 10	6:00 p.m.	Washington State	No. 25	Stanford Stadium; Stanford, CA	ESPN	W 34–17	44,135
October 18	7:30 p.m.	at No. 17 Arizona State	No. 23	Sun Devil Stadium; Tempe, AZ	ESPN	L 10–26	59,012
October 25	12:30 p.m.	Oregon State^{†}		Stanford Stadium; Stanford, CA	ESPN2	W 38–14	48,401
November 1	4:30 p.m.	at No. 5 Oregon		Autzen Stadium; Eugene, OR (rivalry)	FOX	L 16–45	58,974
November 15	3:00 p.m.	No. 25 Utah		Stanford Stadium; Stanford, CA	P12N	L 17–20 ^{2OT}	44,635
November 22	1:00 p.m.	at California		California Memorial Stadium; Berkeley, CA (117th Big Game/Stanford Axe)	FS1	W 38–17	56,483
November 28	12:30 p.m.	at No. 9 UCLA		Rose Bowl; Pasadena, CA (rivalry)	ABC	W 31–10	70,658
December 30	7:00 p.m.	vs. Maryland*		Levi's Stadium; Santa Clara, CA (Foster Farms Bowl)	ESPN	W 45–21	34,780
*Non-conference game; ^{†}Homecoming; Rankings from AP Poll released prior to the game; All times are in Pacific time

== Game summaries ==
=== UC Davis ===
	1	2	3	4	Total
Aggies	0	0	0	0	0
#11 Cardinal	14	24	0	7	45

=== No.14 USC ===
	1	2	3	4	Total
#14 Trojans	7	0	3	3	13
#13 Cardinal	0	10	0	0	10

=== Army ===
	1	2	3	4	Total
Black Knights	0	0	0	0	0
#15 Cardinal	7	7	7	14	35

=== At Washington ===
	1	2	3	4	Total
#16 Cardinal	3	10	0	7	20
Huskies	0	13	0	0	13

=== At No. 9 Notre Dame (Legends Trophy) ===
	1	2	3	4	Total
#14 Cardinal	7	0	0	7	14
#9 Fighting Irish	0	7	0	10	17

=== Washington State ===
	1	2	3	4	Total
Cougars	7	0	3	7	17
#25 Cardinal	10	7	7	10	34

=== At No. 17 Arizona State ===
	1	2	3	4	Total
#23 Cardinal	0	0	3	7	10
#17 Sun Devils	0	14	3	9	26

=== Oregon State ===
	1	2	3	4	Total
Beavers	7	0	0	7	14
Cardinal	14	14	7	3	38

=== At No. 5 Oregon ===
	1	2	3	4	Total
Cardinal	6	7	3	0	16
#5 Ducks	14	10	7	14	45

=== Utah ===
	1	2	3	4	OT	2OT	Total
#25 Utes	0	7	0	0	7	6	20
Cardinal	7	0	0	0	7	3	17

=== California ===
Team	1	2	3	4	Total
• Stanford	10	14	7	7	38
California	0	7	3	7	17

- Date: November 22
- Game start: 4:00 p.m. EST
- Game attendance: 56,483
- TV announcers (FS1): Joe Davis, Joey Harrington, Kris Budden

Scoring summary
Q1	12:38	STAN	Wright 1 yard run (Williamson kick)	STAN 7–0
Q1	6:26	STAN	Williamson 24 yard field goal	STAN 10–0
Q2	14:26	CAL	Anderson 10 yard pass from Goff (Langford kick)	STAN 10–7
Q2	7:59	STAN	Wright 5 yard run (Williamson kick)	STAN 17–7
Q2	1:22	STAN	Hogan 5 yard run (Williamson kick)	STAN 24–7
Q3	9:16	STAN	Wright 2 yard run (Williamson kick)	STAN 31–7
Q3	1:21	CAL	Langford 38 yard field goal	STAN 31–10
Q4	7:36	STAN	Wright 5 yard run (Williamson kick)	STAN 38–10
Q4	2:40	CAL	Lasco 12 yard run (Langford kick)	STAN 38–17

=== At No. 9 UCLA ===
	1	2	3	4	Total
Cardinal	7	14	7	3	31
#9 Bruins	7	3	0	0	10

=== Vs. Maryland (Foster Farms Bowl) ===
	1	2	3	4	Total
Terrapins	0	7	0	14	21
Cardinal	7	21	7	10	45

== Rankings ==
Ranking movements Legend: ██ Increase in ranking ██ Decrease in ranking — = Not ranked RV = Received votes
	Week																
Poll	Pre	1	2	3	4	5	6	7	8	9	10	11	12	13	14	15	Final
AP	11	13	15	16	16	14	25	23	RV	RV	RV	RV	—	—	RV	RV	RV
Coaches	11	10	16	15	14	13	22	20	RV	RV	—	RV	RV	RV	RV	RV	RV
CFP	Not released									—	—	—	—	—	—	—	Not released

== Statistics ==
=== Scores by quarter ===
	1	2	3	4	OT	Total
Opponents	42	68	19	71	13	213
Stanford	92	128	48	75	10	353

== Awards and honors ==
=== Players of the week ===
Following each week's games, Pac-12 conference officials select the players of the week from the conference's teams.

- Week 5 (Sept. 29) Peter Kalambayi, LB
- Week 7 (Oct. 13) Ty Montgomery, WR

=== All-American Selections ===
Offense

- Andrus Peat, OL (TSN, ESPN, SI)

=== All-Pac-12 Conference Team Selections ===
All-Conference Honors
Player	Position	Team
Andrus Peat	OT	1st
Henry Anderson	DL	1st
Jordan Richards	DB	1st
Austin Hooper	TE	2nd
Kyle Murphy	OT	2nd
A. J. Tarpley	LB	2nd
Ty Montgomery (2)	RS	2nd

*Numbers in parentheses (2) indicate multiple All-Pac-12 Team Conference selections for that individual.
