= 2014 Foster Farms Bowl =

- 13th Foster Farms Bowl
Maryland Terrapins	Stanford Cardinal
(7–5)	(7–5)
Big Ten	Pac-12
21	45
Head coach: Randy Edsall	Head coach: David Shaw
	1	2	3	4	Total
Maryland	0	7	0	14	21
Stanford	7	21	7	10	45
- Date: December 30, 2014
- Season: 2014
- Stadium: Levi's Stadium
- Location: Santa Clara, California
- MVP: Offense: Stanford QB Kevin Hogan; Defense: Stanford LB James Vaughters
- Favorite: Stanford by 14.5
- Referee: Reggie Smith (Big XII)
- Attendance: 34,780

United States TV coverage
- Network: ESPN/ESPN Radio
- Announcers: Dave Flemming, Greg McElroy, & Shelley Smith (ESPN); Roxy Bernstein, Tom Ramsey, & Dave Shore (ESPN Radio)

The 2014 Foster Farms Bowl was an American college football bowl game that was played on December 30, 2014, at Levi's Stadium in Santa Clara, California. It was one of the 2014–15 bowl games that concluded the 2014 FBS football season. The 13th edition of the Foster Farms Bowl (previously known as the Fight Hunger Bowl), it featured the Stanford Cardinal from the Pac-12 Conference against the Maryland Terrapins from the Big Ten Conference. The game began at 7:00 p.m. PST and aired on ESPN/ESPN Radio. It was sponsored by the Foster Farms poultry company. Stanford won the game by a final score of 45–21.

== Teams ==
The game represented the first overall meeting between these two teams.

== Game summary ==
=== Scoring summary ===
Scoring summary

Quarter	Time	Drive			Team	Scoring information	Score	
Quarter	Time	Plays	Yards	TOP	Team	Scoring information	MD	STAN
1	8:03	12	75	6:57	STAN	Remound Wright 1-yard touchdown run, Jordan Williamson kick good	0	7
2	14:19	6	52	2:27	MD	Wes Brown 1-yard touchdown run, Brad Craddock kick good	7	7
2	11:16	5	49	2:33	STAN	Wright 3-yard touchdown run, Williamson kick good	7	14
2	8:44	5	70	1:38	STAN	Wright 1-yard touchdown run, Williamson kick good	7	21
2	1:17	10	54	4:57	STAN	Devon Cajuste 8-yard touchdown reception from Kevin Hogan, Williamson kick good	7	28
3	10:18	3	34	0:54	STAN	Cajuste 9-yard touchdown reception from Hogan, Williamson kick good	7	35
4	14:52	9	66	5:04	STAN	Ricky Seale 1-yard touchdown run, Williamson kick good	7	42
4	14:39	–	–	–	MD	Kickoff returned 100 yards for touchdown by William Likely, Craddock kick good	14	42
4	5:16	10	33	6:02	STAN	29-yard field goal by Williamson	14	45
4	2:12	7	78	3:04	MD	C. J. Brown 2-yard touchdown run, Craddock kick good	21	45
"TOP" = time of possession. For other American football terms, see Glossary of American football.							21	45

=== Statistics ===
Statistics	MD	STAN
First downs	12	22
Plays–yards	54–222	71–414
Rushes–yards	27–17	45–206
Passing yards	205	208
Passing: Comp–Att–Int	15–27–1	18–26–0
Time of possession	22:53	37:07
