= Mark (surname) =

Family name

Mark as a surname may refer to:

- Donald Mark (1926–2018), American judge
- Hans Mark (1929–2021), German-born American aerospace engineer
- Heinrich Mark (1911–2004), Estonian politician
- Jacob Mark (born 1991), Danish politician
- Luke Mark, UK musician
- Melissa Mark-Viverito (born 1969), American politician
- Michael Mark (disambiguation), multiple people
- Nellie V. Mark (1857–1935), American physician, suffragist
- Oliver Mark (born 1963), German photographer
- Peter Mark (conductor) (born 1940), American conductor and violist
- Robert Mark (1917–2010), Commissioner of the Metropolitan Police
- Ronald T. Mark (1898–1958), British military aviator
- Tramon Mark (born 2001), American college basketball player
- Ülar Mark (born 1968), Estonian architect
- Vanessa Mark (born 1996), German bobsledder
- Lüüdia Vallimäe-Mark (1925–2004), Estonian artist

== See also ==
- Mark (given name)
- Marc (surname)
- Marks (surname)
- Marx (surname)
