= Bady Minck =

Luxembourgish filmmaker, film producer and artist

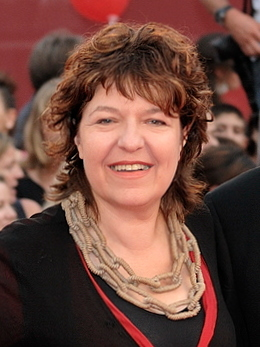
- Bady Minck in 2009
- Born: Ettelbruck, Luxembourg
- Occupation: filmmaker

Bady Minck (born in Ettelbruck, Luxembourg) is a Luxembourgish filmmaker, film producer and artist.

== Life ==
She studied sculpture at the Academy of Fine Arts and experimental film at the University of Applied Arts in Vienna. Her work has been screened at international film festivals (e.g. Cannes, Berlin, Toronto, Rotterdam, Locarno, Sundance) and exhibited at museums like the Centre Pompidou in Paris. She is a founding member of the film production companies AMOUR FOU Vienna and AMOUR FOU Luxembourg (Luxembourg). She lives and works in Vienna and Luxembourg.

In 2009, she was a member of the Venice Film Festival Orizzonti Jury.

== Filmography ==
- 2017 MappaMundi, 45 min, Premiere: Sundance 2017
- 2008 Schein Sein (Seems To Be), 8 min, Premiere: Berlinale 2008
- 2007 Free Radicals, 90 min, with Bernhard Zachhuber, Premiere: Biennale di Venezia 2007
- 2007 Das Sein und das Nichts (Being and Nothingness), 10 min, Premiere: Biennale di Venezia 2007
- 2006 Roll over Mozart, 1 min, Premiere: Rotterdam IFF 2006
- 2005 La Belle est la Bête, 3 min, Premiere: Rotterdam IFF 2005
- 2003 Im Anfang war der Blick (In the Beginning was the Eye), 45 min, Premiere: Festival de Cannes 2003
- 1996 Mécanomagie, 16 min, Premiere: Rotterdam IFF 1997
- 1995 Attwengers Luft (The Air by Attwenger), 3 min, Premiere: Locarno IFF 1996
- 1988 Der Mensch mit den modernen Nerven (The Man with modern Nerves), 8 min, with Stefan Stratil, Premiere: Festival de Cannes 1989
