= Michael Mark =

Michael Mark may refer to:

- Michael Mark (actor) (1886–1975), Russian-born American film actor
- Michael Mark (musician), American musician, composer, and actor
- Michael Mark (rugby league), Papua New Guinean rugby league footballer

== See also ==
- Michael Marks (disambiguation)
- Mark (surname)
