= Ettelbruck =

Ettelbruck Ettelbréck (Luxembourgish) Ettelbrück (German)
- Commune
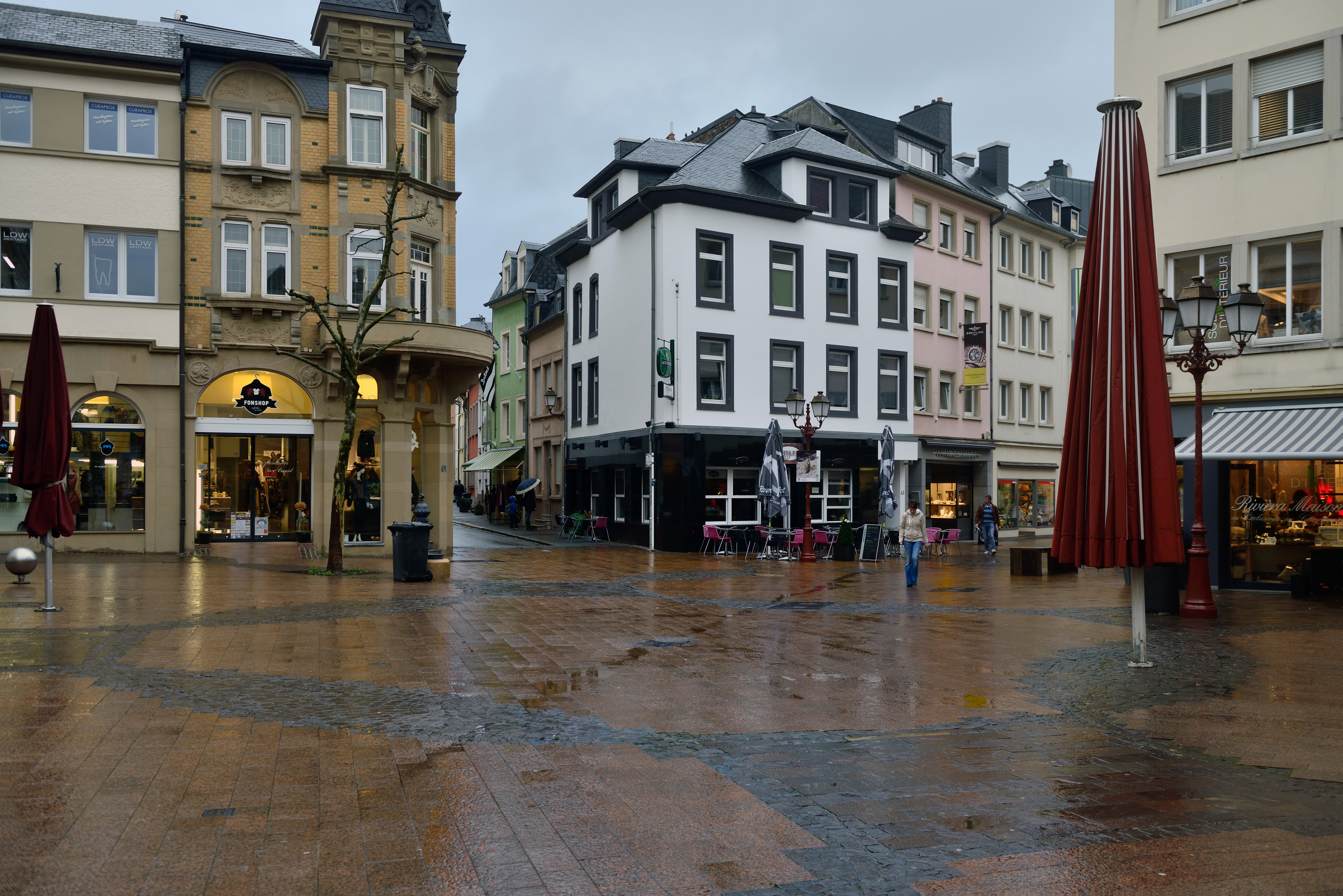
- Ettelbruck Grand-Rue in November 2013

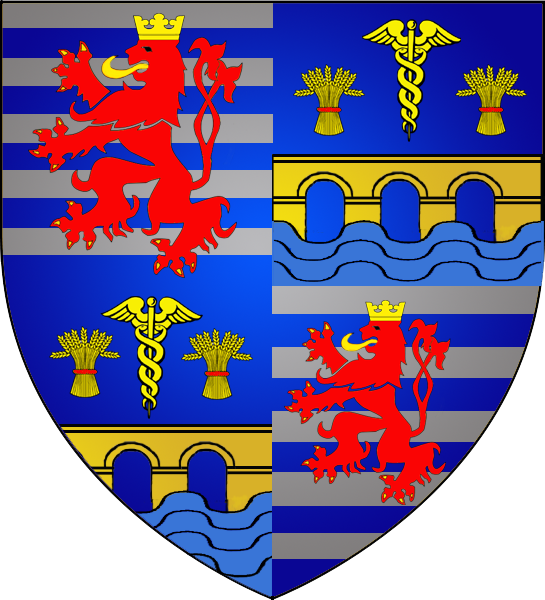
- Coat of arms Brandmark

- Map of Luxembourg with Ettelbruck highlighted in orange, and the canton in dark red
- Coordinates: 49.8464°N 6.0992°E
- Country: Luxembourg
- Canton: Diekirch

Government
  - Mayor: Bob Steichen

Area
  - Total: 15.18 km^{2} (5.86 sq mi)
  - Rank: 77th of 100
- Highest elevation: 382 m (1,253 ft)
  - Rank: 68th of 100
- Lowest elevation: 192 m (630 ft)
  - Rank: 23rd of 100

Population (2025)
  - Total: 10,149
  - Rank: 14th of 100
  - Density: 668.6/km^{2} (1,732/sq mi)
  - Rank: 12th of 100
- Time zone: UTC+1 (CET)
  - Summer (DST): UTC+2 (CEST)
- LAU 2: LU0000605
- Website: ettelbruck.lu

Ettelbruck (Luxembourgish: Ettelbréck pronounced [ˈætəlbʀek], German: Ettelbrück [ˈɛtl̩bʁʏk]) is a commune with city status in northern Luxembourg, with a population of 10,212 inhabitants.

== History ==
Until 1850, both Erpeldange and Schieren were part of the Ettelbruck commune as well, but both towns were detached from Ettelbruck by law on 1 July 1850.

Germany occupied Ettelbruck on 10 May 1940. The town was first liberated by US forces on 11 September 1944, however it was recaptured by Germany on 16 December during the Battle of the Bulge. Ettelbruck was finally liberated nine days later on Christmas Day, 25 December 1944 by US troops, led by General George S. Patton. One of Ettelbruck's main squares is named Patton Square, and is located at the spot where the German offensive into Luxembourg's Alzette Valley was stopped, ending its attempt to reoccupy the country as a whole. From 1954 to 2004, the town held a Remembrance Day celebration each July honoring General Patton and the US, British, French, Belgian and Luxembourgish troops who fought with him there.

== Population ==
Historical population

Year	Pop.	±%
1821	1,681	—
1851	2,699	+60.6%
1900	3,770	+39.7%
1910	4,173	+10.7%
1922	4,019	−3.7%
1935	4,606	+14.6%

Year	Pop.	±%
1947	4,452	−3.3%
1960	5,101	+14.6%
1970	5,990	+17.4%
1981	6,454	+7.7%
1990	6,720	+4.1%
2000	7,467	+11.1%

Year	Pop.	±%
2005	7,442	−0.3%
2010	7,700	+3.5%
2015	8,347	+8.4%
2020	9,148	+9.6%
2021	9,246	+1.1%

Source data

== Government ==
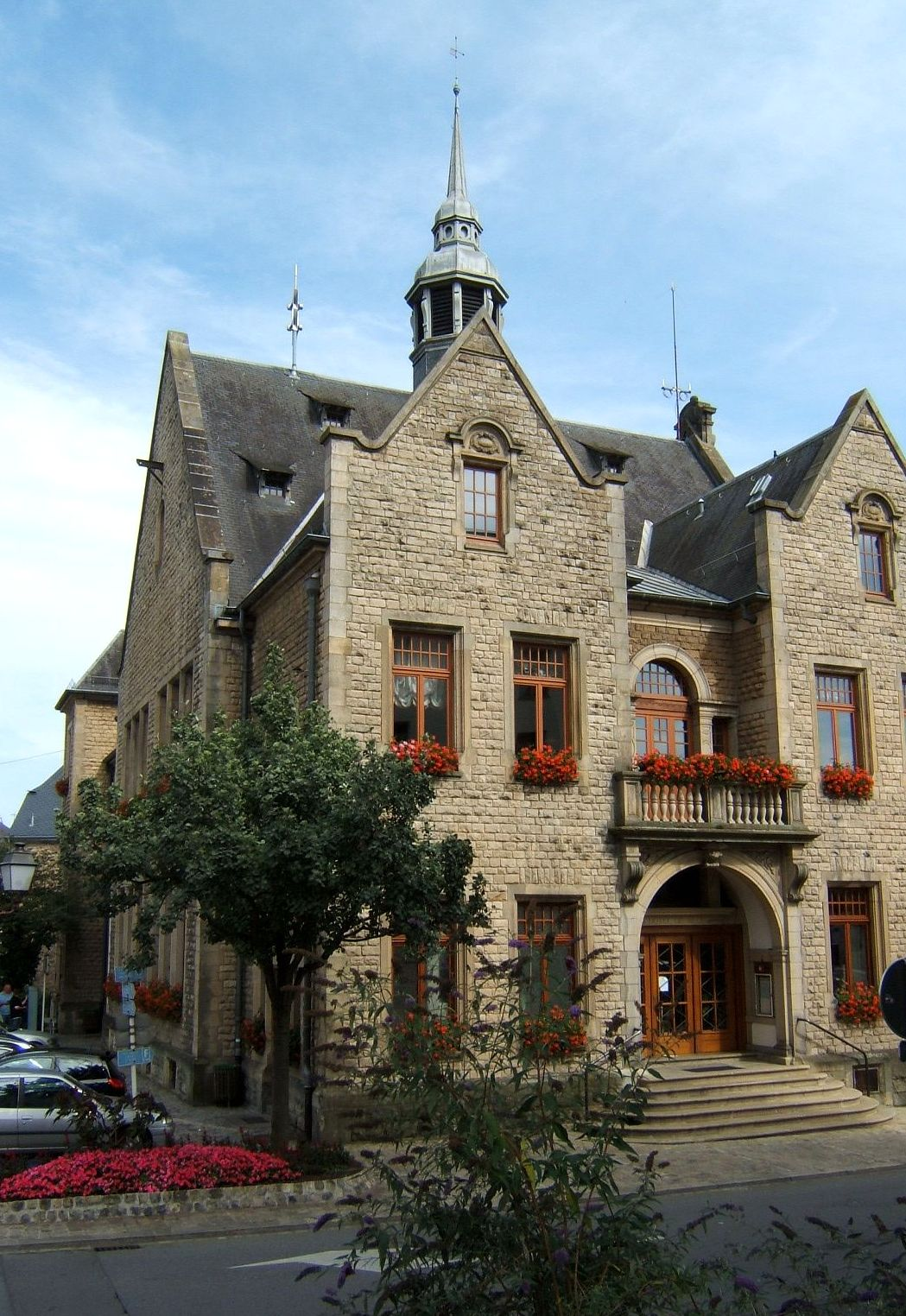
Ettelbruck Town Hall

Ettelbruck is one of the 12 communes of the canton of Diekirch, which is part of the district of Diekirch. Governmentally, the Ettelbruck communal council (French: Conseil communal de Ettelbruck) serves as the commune's local council. The council consists of thirteen members, elected every six years.

== Transportation ==
Ettelbruck lies where three rivers meet: the Sauer, the Wark and the Alzette. This location has historically made Ettelbruck a major transportation hub for the country second only to the city of Luxembourg.

Ettelbruck serves as a junction, where the line to Diekirch branches off the main line Luxembourg – Liège. The station is on Line 10, which connects Luxembourg City to central and northern Luxembourg towards Gouvy and Wiltz, with a branch line connecting to Diekirch.

The A7 motorway, known as the Motorway of the North, is connected to Ettelbruck via the trunk road B7 which runs along the east of Ettelbruck. The B7 junction is bordering Schieren. The other main access routes are the national roads N15 Rue de Bastogne, and the N7 that crosses Ettelbruck north to south.

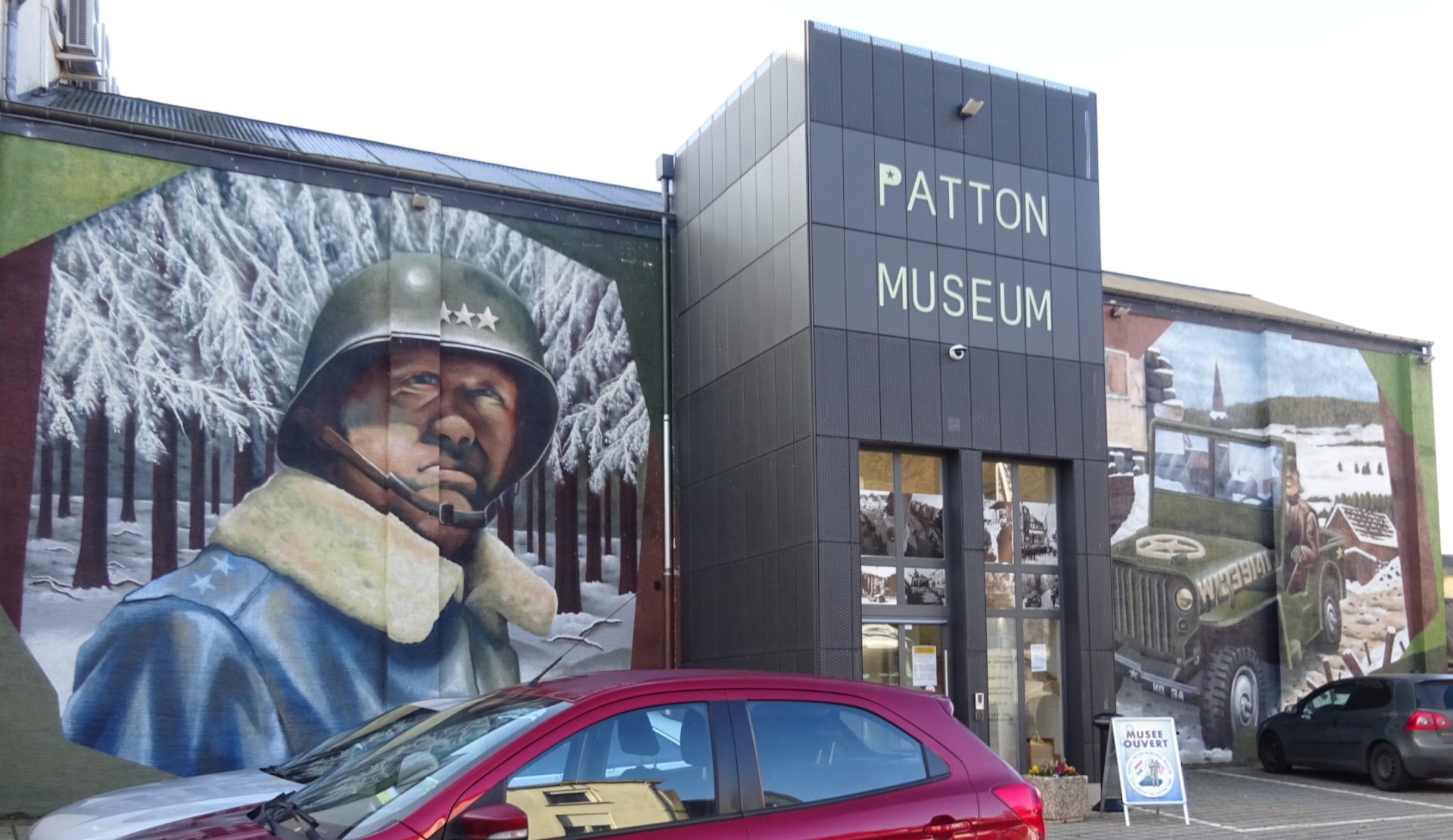
General Patton Memorial Museum

== Attractions ==
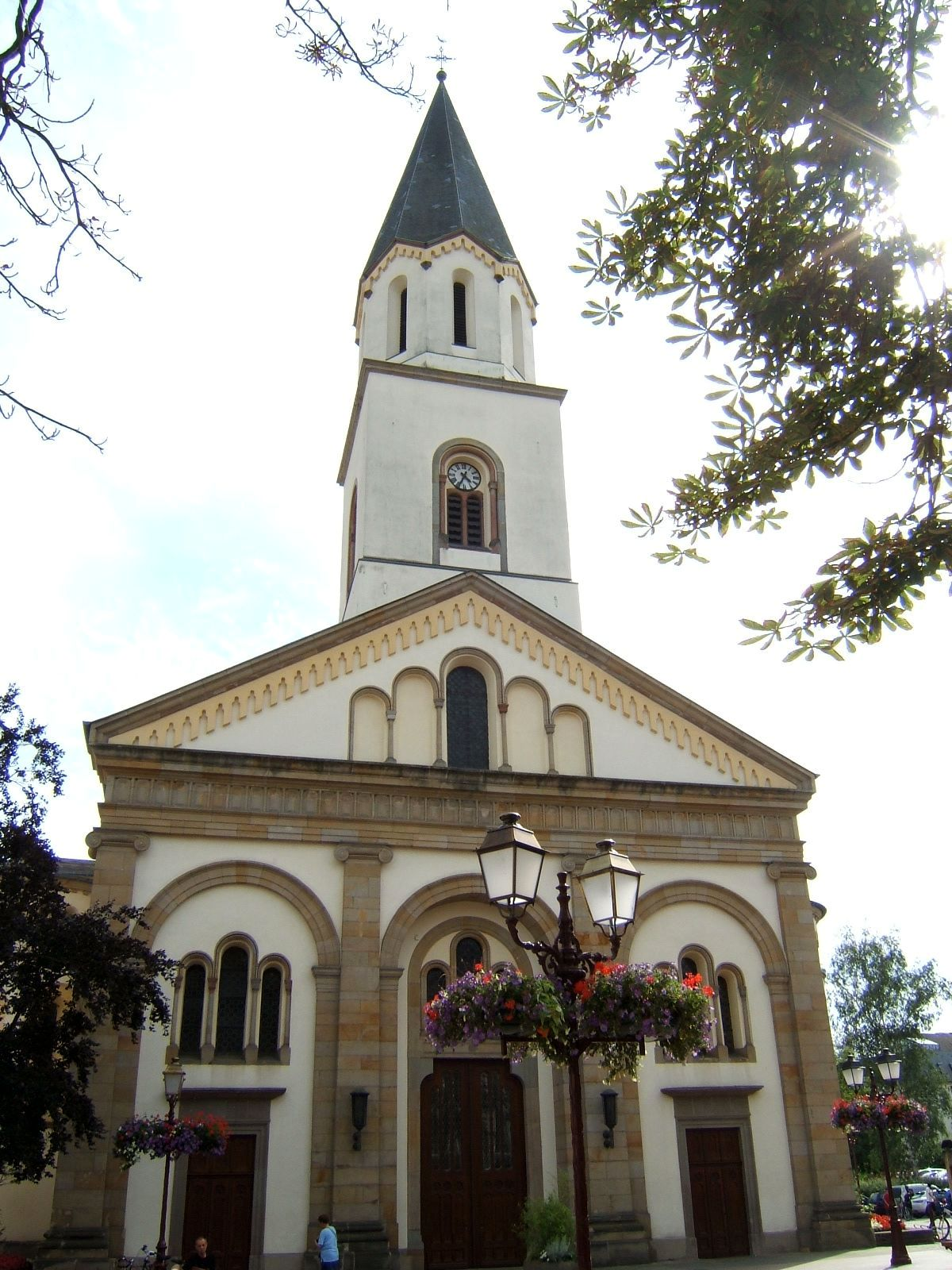
D' Kierch Ettelbréck in the center of Ettelbruck

The General George S. Patton Memorial Museum in Ettelbruck, opened in July 1995, honours the general who liberated the town. The museum exhibits photographs, documents and memorabilia relating to the German occupation of Luxembourg (May 1940 to September 1944). It also displays a cast of the Patton statue at West Point. The museum was renovated in 2014. In September 2024, the Luxembourg government recognised Ettelbruck as a major site of World War II memory and supported the commemoration of the “Route of Liberation of Europe”, including enhanced visitor facilities around the museum and Patton Square.

The Ettelbruck parish church—D' Kierch Ettelbréck—is a decagonal structure. Restored in 1849, the church contains tombstones dating as far back as the 15th century. The town’s Festivities Department, based at Place de l’Église, organises annual cultural events in the church square, underscoring its role as a community landmark.

== Sport ==
Ettelbruck since 1917 has been the home of the football team FC Etzella Ettelbruck. The team plays in Ettelbruck's football stadium Stade Am Deich which has a capacity of about 2,000.

== Health ==
Ettelbruck is a medical centre for northern Luxembourg, as it is home to the Central Hospice (founded in 1855) which is now the location of the Ettelbruck Neuro-Psychiatric Hospital (in French, CHNP = Centre Hospitalier Neuro-Psychiatrique) with approximately 500 beds. Lucien Wercollier's marble sculpture La Vague ("The Wave") is located in Ettelbruck on the grounds of the CHNP.

The Centre Hospital du Nord (CHdN) Ettelbruck was renovated and reopened as a state of the art medical facility in 2003 on the site of the earlier Charles Marx Clinic and Saint Louis Clinic. The original clinic was founded by Charles Marx in 1936. The Saint Louis Clinic became a point of resistance preceding the Nazi occupation, when its founder Charles Marx treated downed French airmen (including the future general Marcel-Pierre Faure) in April, 1940. Following the occupation of Luxembourg, Marx fled to France. Following the Nazi occupation, Marx was arrested and jailed for treating the airmen. In 1946, following liberation and Marx's accidental death in that year, the clinic was renamed as the Charles Marx Clinic to honor him. In 1963, the clinic was renamed the New Saint Louis Clinic when it was revamped and modernised, becoming the New Saint Louis Hospital (French: Nouvel Hôpital St Louis) in 2003. In 2010 the former Hôpital Saint-Louis merged with the Clinique Saint-Joseph in Wiltz to form the Centre Hospital du Nord.

== Education ==
Ettelbruck is an educational centre for the north of the country. It is home to the St. Anne Girls' Boarding School, founded in 1852 and located between Rue du Canal and Grand-Rue. Parts of the State Agricultural School (LTA), founded in 1883, are still in the Avenue Lucien Salentiny leading to Warken. The main structures moved in 2021 to a newly build campus in Gilsdorf, above the Diekirch sports centre. The Avenue Lucien Salentiny is also home to the Lycée Technique d'Ettelbruck (LTEtt) which was founded as a vocational school in 1969.

== Ons Heemecht ==
Ons Heemecht ("Our Homeland"), the national anthem of Luxembourg, was first sung publicly in Ettelbruck on 5 June 1864. Both the Alzette and Sauer rivers are named in the song, and since Ettelbruck is located at the point where they both meet, the location was appropriate for its public introduction.

== Notable Ettelbruckers ==
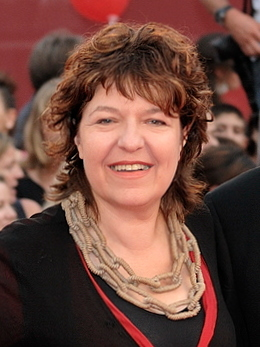
Bady Minck, 2009

- Charles Marx (1903–1946), physician and WWII resistance leader; founded a hospital with 50 beds in Ettelbruck
- Pierre Joris (1946-2025), a Luxembourg-American poet, translator, anthologist and essayist; raised in Ettelbruck
- Monique Melsen (born 1951), a Luxembourgish singer, took part in the 1971 Eurovision Song Contest.
- Prof. François Diederich (1952–2020), a Luxembourgish chemist specializing in organic chemistry.
- Bady Minck (born ca 1960), a filmmaker, film producer and artist

=== Politicians ===
- Ernest Mühlen (1926–2014), a Luxembourgish politician, economist and financial journalist
- Lucien Weiler (1951-2026), a Luxembourgish politician and jurist
- Charles Goerens (born 1952), a Luxembourgish politician and MEP
- Marco Schank (born 1954), a Luxembourgish politician
- Carole Dieschbourg (born 1977), a Luxembourg politician and writer

=== Sport ===
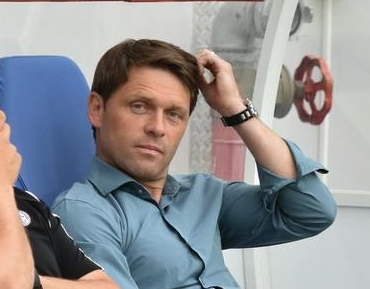
Luc Holtz, 2015

- Eddi Gutenkauf (1928-2024), a Luxembourgish fencer, competed at the 1960 Summer Olympics
- Ni Xialian (born 1963), a female Chinese-born table tennis player who resides in Ettelbruck
- Luc Holtz (born 1969), a former Luxembourgish football player, manager of the Luxembourg national football team
- Carlos Ferreira (born 1980), a Luxembourgish footballer, 207 pro games and 20 for Luxembourg
- Eric Hoffmann (born 1984), a Luxembourgish footballer, over 350 pro games and 88 for Luxembourg
- Daniel da Mota (born 1985), a Luxembourgish footballer, over 430 pro games and over 100 for Luxembourg
- Laurent Carnol (born 1989), a Luxembourgish breaststroke swimmer, competed in the 2008 2012 and 2016 Summer Olympics
