= Michael Marks (disambiguation) =

Michael Marks was one of the two co-founders of the retail chain Marks & Spencer.

Michael Marks may also refer to:

- Michael Marks (footballer) (born 1968), English former footballer
- Michael Marks (financier) (born 1941), British businessman
- Michael Marks (Saw franchise), fictional character

== See also ==
- Michael Mark (disambiguation)
