= Dominique Urbany =

Luxembourgish politician

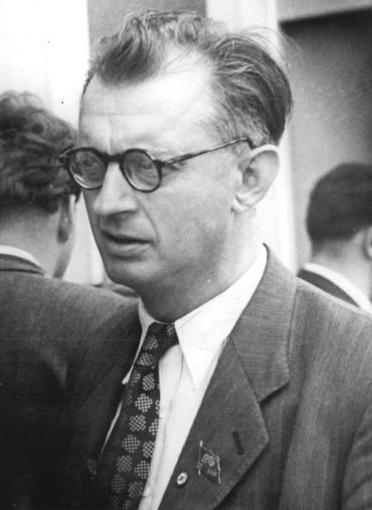
- Dominique Urbany

Chairman of the Communist Party of Luxembourg
- In office 1965–1976
- Succeeded by: René Urbany

General Secretary of the Communist Party of Luxembourg
- In office 1935–1965

Minister for Social Assistance and Public Health
- In office 21 June 1946 – 1 March 1947
- Preceded by: Charles Marx
- Succeeded by: Alphonse Osch

Personal details
- Born: 29 March 1903 Rumelange, Luxembourg
- Died: 21 October 1986 (aged 83) Luxembourg City, Luxembourg
- Party: KPL
- Occupation: Politician

Dominique Urbany (29 March 1903 – 21 October 1986) was a Luxembourgish politician. He was the father of journalist and politician René Urbany.

Urbany was one of the delegates at the Differdange socialist congress who voted for affiliation to the Communist International. He was a founder of the Young Communist League of Luxembourg. He became general secretary of the Communist Party of Luxembourg in 1936. He was elected to parliament in 1945, leading the communist faction. He remained in parliament for three decades. In 1965 he became chairman of the Communist Party.
