= Harry Marks =

Harry Marks may refer to:

- Harry Marks (journalist), British politician and journalist
- Harry Marks (broadcast designer), British-American broadcast designer and co-founder of the TED Conference
- Harry Marks (architect), architect in Toowoomba, Queensland, Australia
