= Charles Marx =

Luxembourgish politician (1903–1946)

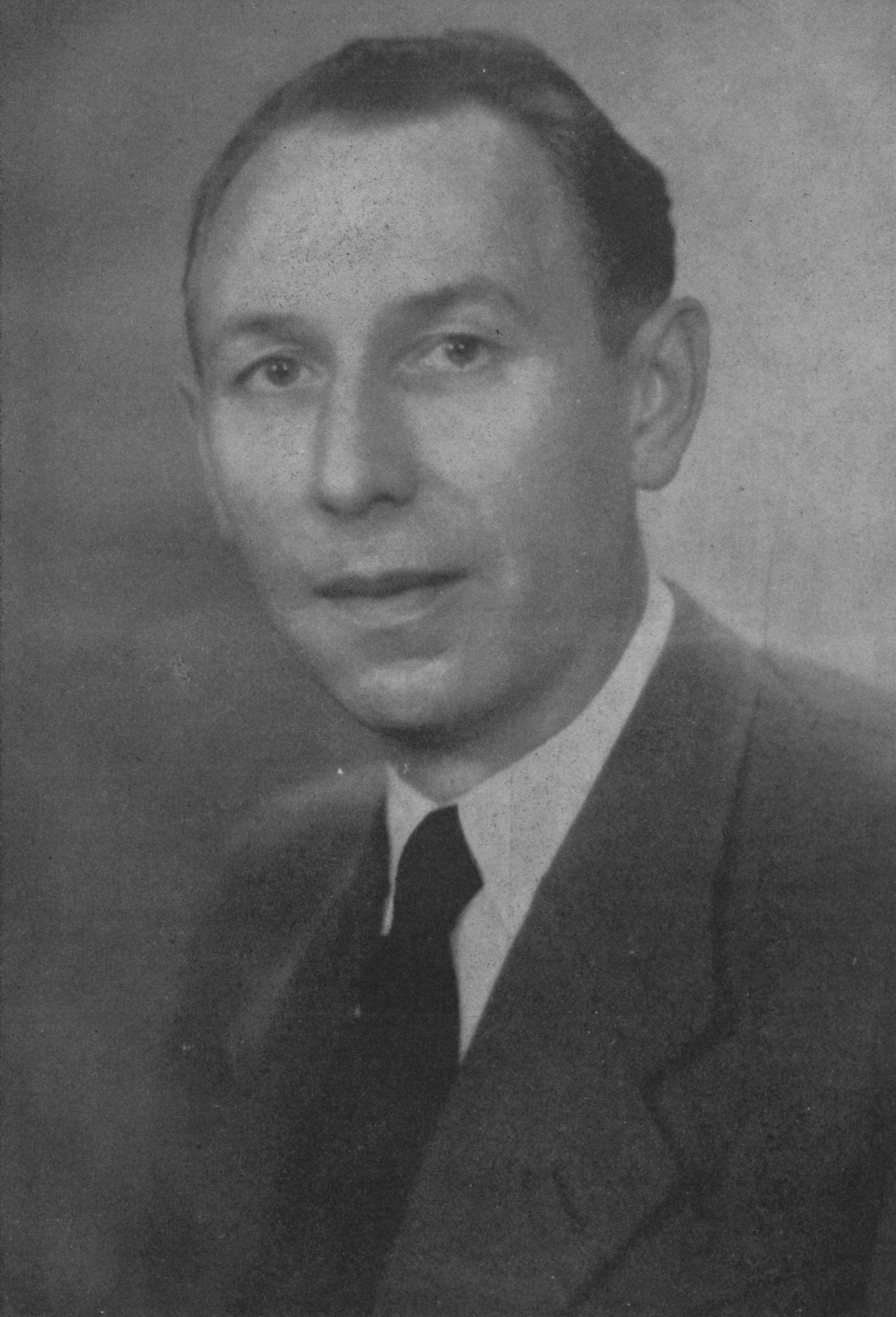
- Marx c. 1946

Minister for Social Assistance and Public Health
- In office 14 November 1945 – 13 June 1946
- Succeeded by: Dominique Urbany

Personal details
- Born: 26 July 1903
- Died: 13 June 1946 (aged 42) La Ferté-sous-Jouarre, Seine-et-Marne, France
- Party: KPL
- Occupation: Doctor, politician

Louis Charles Marx (26 July 1903 – 13 June 1946) was a Luxembourgish politician for the Communist Party of Luxembourg. He was a physician by profession, and fought for the French Resistance during the Second World War.

He had very well succeeded in his medical studies in Paris starting as an intern (1929), to become chief of clinical surgery, then a laureate of the Académie Nationale de Médecine and finally a member of the Committee of the French Association of Surgery (1935). He founded his own hospital, of 50 beds, in Ettelbruck, in north-western Luxembourg. There, in 1940, he helped two interned French airmen to escape to France. Marx escaped himself, with his family, just before the German invasion. He briefly directed four French hospitals, in Nevers and Quillan. In July, he founded the first resistance group of the Armée secrète, which, in May 1943, was followed by a first maquis in the western Pyrenees. In June 1943, he was condemned to death in absentia in Montpellier by the Nazis.

In February 1944, Marx was appointed medical commander of the FFI and chief health manager of the Resistance in the eastern Pyrenees. In September 1944, he took part in the liberation of Lyon. In October, being the delegate of the medical resistance council, he was named attaché to the health minister and was charged to organise French-American military surgical structures. At the end of July, he took up the management of the Ettelbruck hospital. In November 1945, he was nominated Minister for Social Assistance and Public Health in Luxembourg.

Marx participated in the National Union Government under Prime Minister Pierre Dupong, representing the Communist Party in the all-party administration. However, Marx and his Romanian wife died on 13 June 1946 in a car accident at La Ferté-sous-Jouarre, in France. He was replaced by Dominique Urbany.
