= Marx (given name) =

Marx is a masculine given name derived from Marcus (name).

== People named Marx ==
- Marx Röist (1454–1524), mayor of Zürich
- Marx Reichlich (1460–1520), painter
- Marx Weiß (1518–1580) painter
- Marx Fugger (Markus Fugger; 1529–1597), Augsburg count
- Marx Rumpolt (born around 1581)
- Marx Augustin (1643–1685)
- Marx Karl Ernst Ludwig Planck (see Max Planck; 1858–1947)
- Marx Dormoy (1888–1941), French socialist politician
- Marx W. Wartofsky (1928–1997), American philosopher
- Marx Santos (born 1988), Brazilian football player

== See also ==
- Marx Augustin, fictional Austrian minstrel, bagpiper, and poet
