= Graciela Gutiérrez Marx =

Argentine artist (1945–2022)

Graciela Gutiérrez Marx (4 April 1945 – 30 January 2022) was an Argentine artist known for her speciality in mail art.

== Early life ==
Gutiérrez Marx was born in La Plata, Buenos Aires, Argentina on 4 April 1945.

== Education ==
Marx obtained bachelor's degree in education and sculpture from the Escuela Superior de Bellas Artes at the Universidad Nacional de La Plata in 1967 and later on she joined the faculty. In 2007 she also obtained her master's degree in aesthetics and art theory there. Marx was a student and assistant to Manuel Lopez Blanco, the head of the Department of Philosophy and Aesthetics at the University, where she was taught about the possibilities of consciousness through Hegelian theories, and phenomenological and semiotic thinking. Marx studied sculpture with Aurelio Macchi where she began to create sculptures out of scrap metal with rust.

== Career ==
From 1968 to 1969 she had an exhibit at the Lirolay Gallery of Buenos Aires and was awarded the "Ver y Estimar" prize, where she was invited to join the Di Tella Institute but it was closed due to General Ongania's dictatorship. Marx was interested in collective art, and in the late 1960s Edgardo A. Vigo introduced her to "mail art" which was related to "new forms of concrete poetry: process poems, visual poetry, action poetry". In the mid 1970s, Horacio Zavala, taught her all about Artecorreo by sending her an invite to an exhibition of rubber stamps where she became part of the mail exchange lists. In 1975, Marx participated in the first mail art exhibit in Argentina entitled “Última exposición internacional de art correo” where she had “woodcut envelopes with her face printed on them and rubber-stamp artworks whose tone anticipated the disappearance of thousands of people during the dictatorship. When the dictatorship ended in 1984 and democracy was restored she changed her signature to “GGMarx”. She has been in multiple exhibits and in the 1980s she started participating in a collaborative project of collective poems (poemas colectivos). One of which was entitled “El tendedero” (the clothesline) where she invited people to build a poem together where they would write a few words on notecard and pin it an article of clothing of a loved one and then sewed the clothing into a flag. During 1984 Marx helped form the Asociación Latinoericana y del Caribe de Artistas-correo in the city of Rosario with Clemente Padin, Noni Argañaraz, Jorge Orta, Susana Lombardo, and Mamablanca (Gutiérrez Marx’s mother) after their exhibit entitled Primer encuentro de arte experimental y mail-art. In 2010, she released a book entitled Artecorreo: artistas invisibles en la red postal about mail art and her career. She resided in Buenos Aires.

== Personal life and death ==
Marx died on 30 January 2022, at the age of 79.

== Collections ==
- Migros Museum für Gegenwartskunst has two of her pieces: Mamablanca Treasure. 1981. Inkjet on paper. Edition 1/5. 2 parts: each 54 x 39 cm and Material Metamorphosis. 1981. Inkjet on paper. 40 x 68.
- 54 pieces of Gutiérrez Marx’s mail art she sent from La Plata, Argentina in the Mail Art Network are at the Museet For Sanmtids Kunst (Museum of Contemporary Arts) Denmark in the Lomholt Mail Art Archive.
- Walden Gallery in Buenos Aires, Argentina has 4 of the images from "Mamablanca Treasure" in their gallery.
- Museo de Arte Contemporáneo Latinoamericano in La Plata has two of her pieces; Alumbramiento en las puertas del paraiso II (Birth at the gates of paradise II). 1995. Mixed Media. 153 cm x 153 cm and Vuelo en hard edge (Hard edge flight). Miuexed Media. 150 cm x 150 cm. 2000.
