= Warken, Luxembourg =

Town in Ettelbruck, Luxembourg

Coordinates: 49°51′N 6°06′E

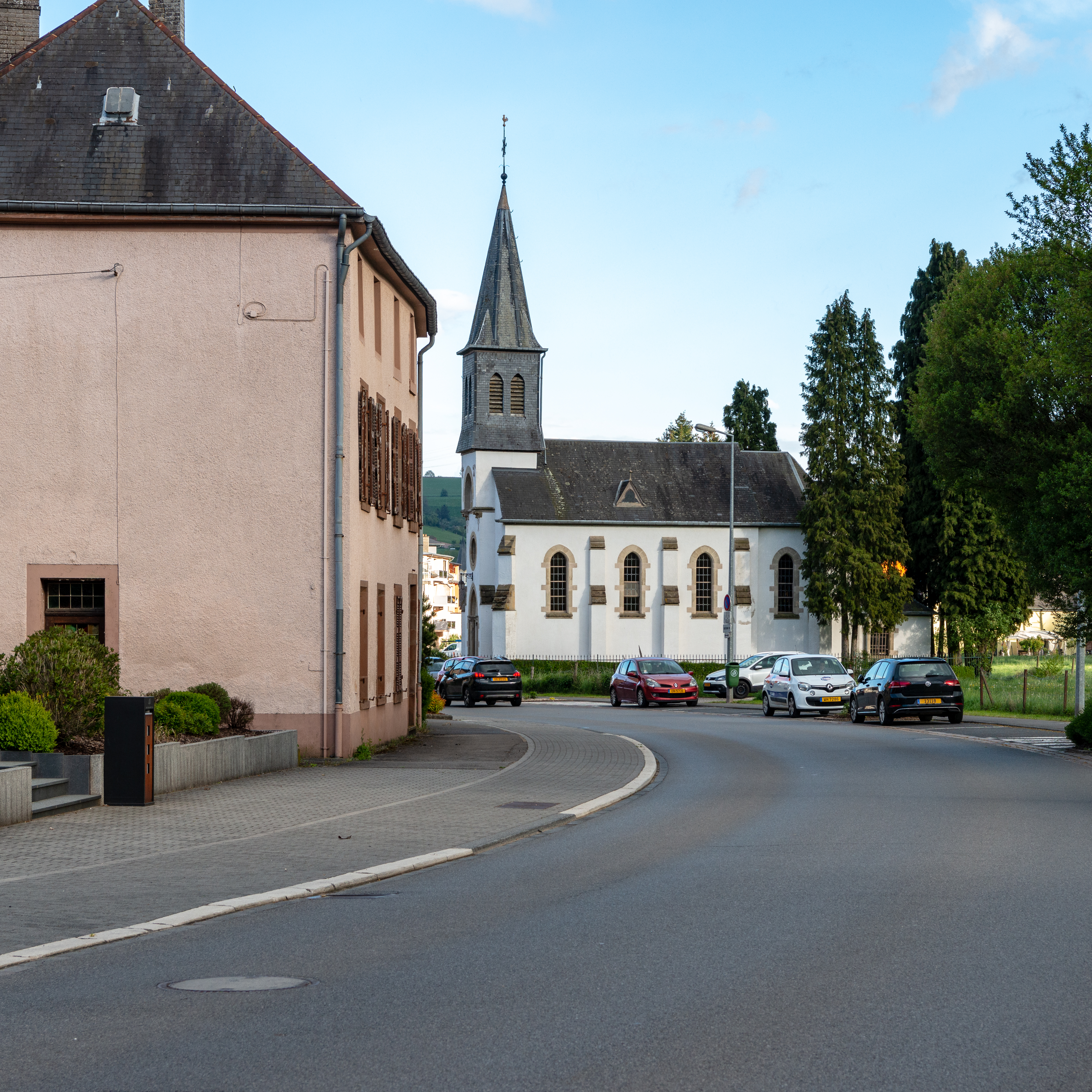

Warken (German pronunciation: [ˈvaʁkn̩]; Luxembourgish: Waarken) is a town in the commune of Ettelbruck, in central Luxembourg. The village has a population of 1,540 as of September 2026 and lies near the Wark River. Warken is split in five departments: Cité Bourschterbach, Cité Warkdall, Cité Breechen. rue de Welscheid and rue de Buerden.

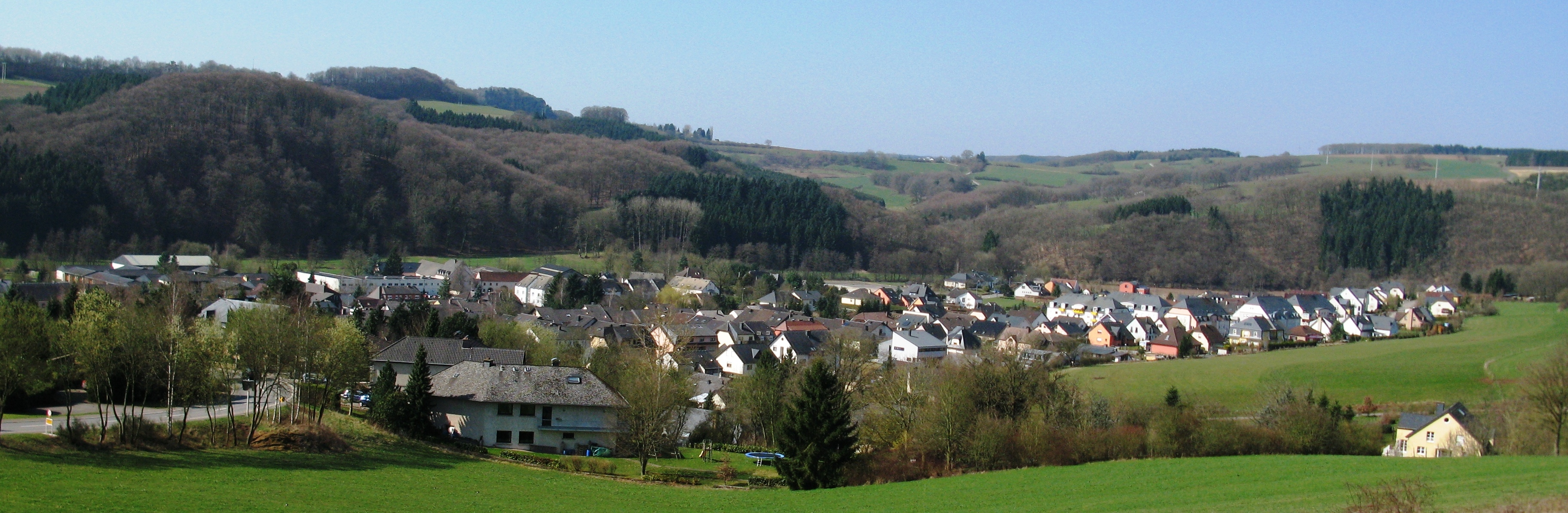
Warken seen from the hill "op der Haardt"
