= Robert Marc (artist) =

French painter

Robert Marc (1943–1993) was a French post-Cubist artist born in Auxerre.

== Biography ==
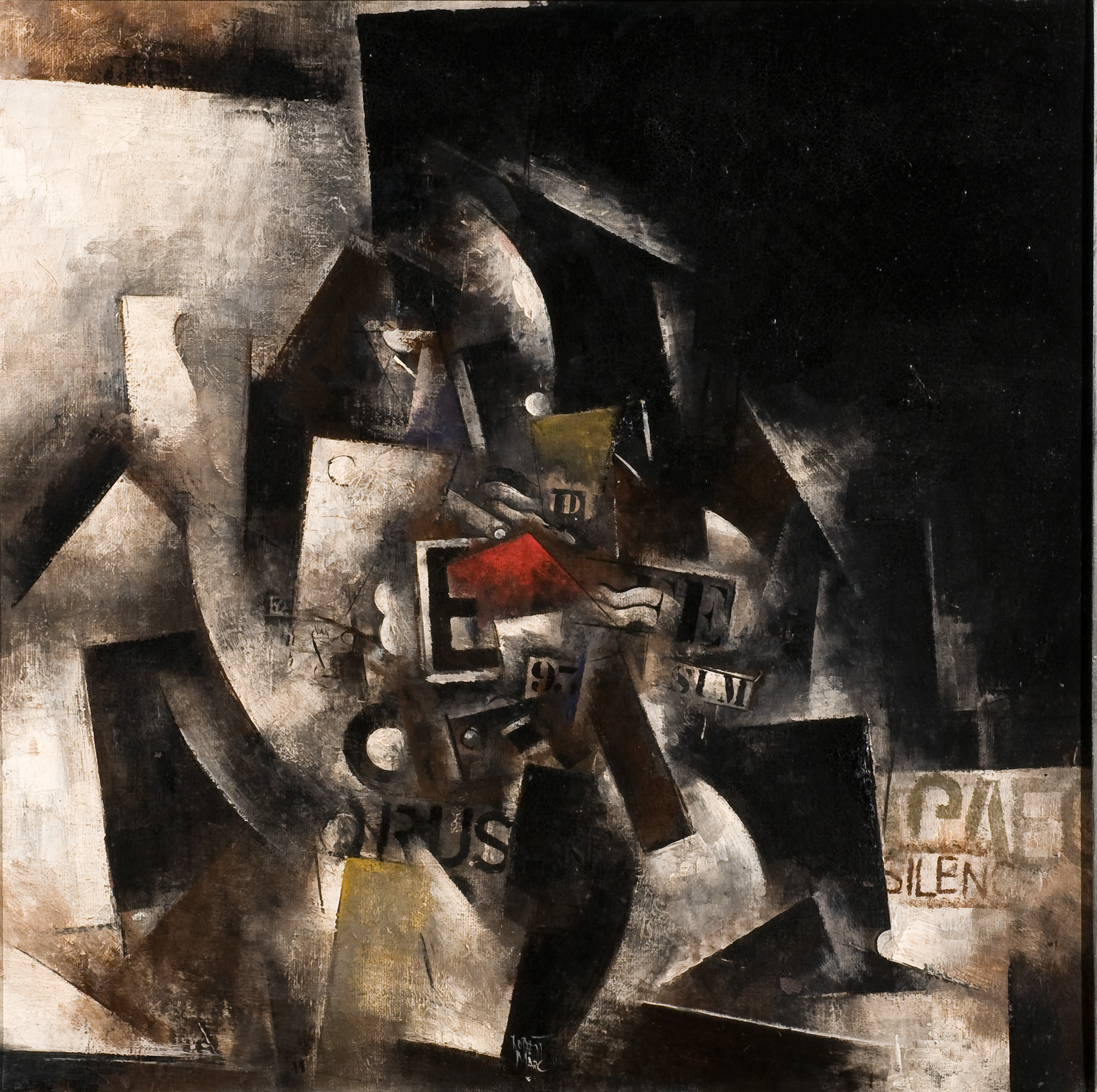
Robert Marc, Untitled (9720), oil on canvas, 90 x 90cm

Marc spent his youth in Switzerland before returning to France to Study art. He studied in Paris during the 1960s and was witness to the social upheavals of the period including the 1968 student riots. His work was inspired during his time in Paris through exposure to several influences including: the museums of Europe, that enhanced his artistic knowledge, the music of John Coltrane, and also African Art that he saw in the galleries on Rue Guenegaud. However, he preferred the solitude of the countryside, and having finished his studies, he returned to his native Burgundy where he produced most of his work in his studio there.

He was discovered in the early 1980s by the New York dealer Barry Friedman. Friedman bought a work by Marc from a Parisian gallery that was unsigned and at the time he was unaware of its authorship; as Friedman reveals: "At the time, Marc didn't sign his paintings, as he believed that the signature interfered with the image". These images were influenced by Russian Avant-Garde artists Malevich and Rodchenko, rather than the western European cubists such as Picasso and Braque.

The meeting with Friedman was decisive. His first solo exhibition was in 1988 in Toulouse, and the same year in New York City. The last one was in 1995 in Metz. During his career, Marc exhibited in France and internationally including shows in New York City and Tokyo. He worked up until his death in 1993. Marc's wife continued to exhibit his paintings in her own gallery, Galerie du Ressort, until 1998.

Alon Zakaim Fine Art staged an exhibition of Marc's work in 2011.

== Selected exhibitions ==
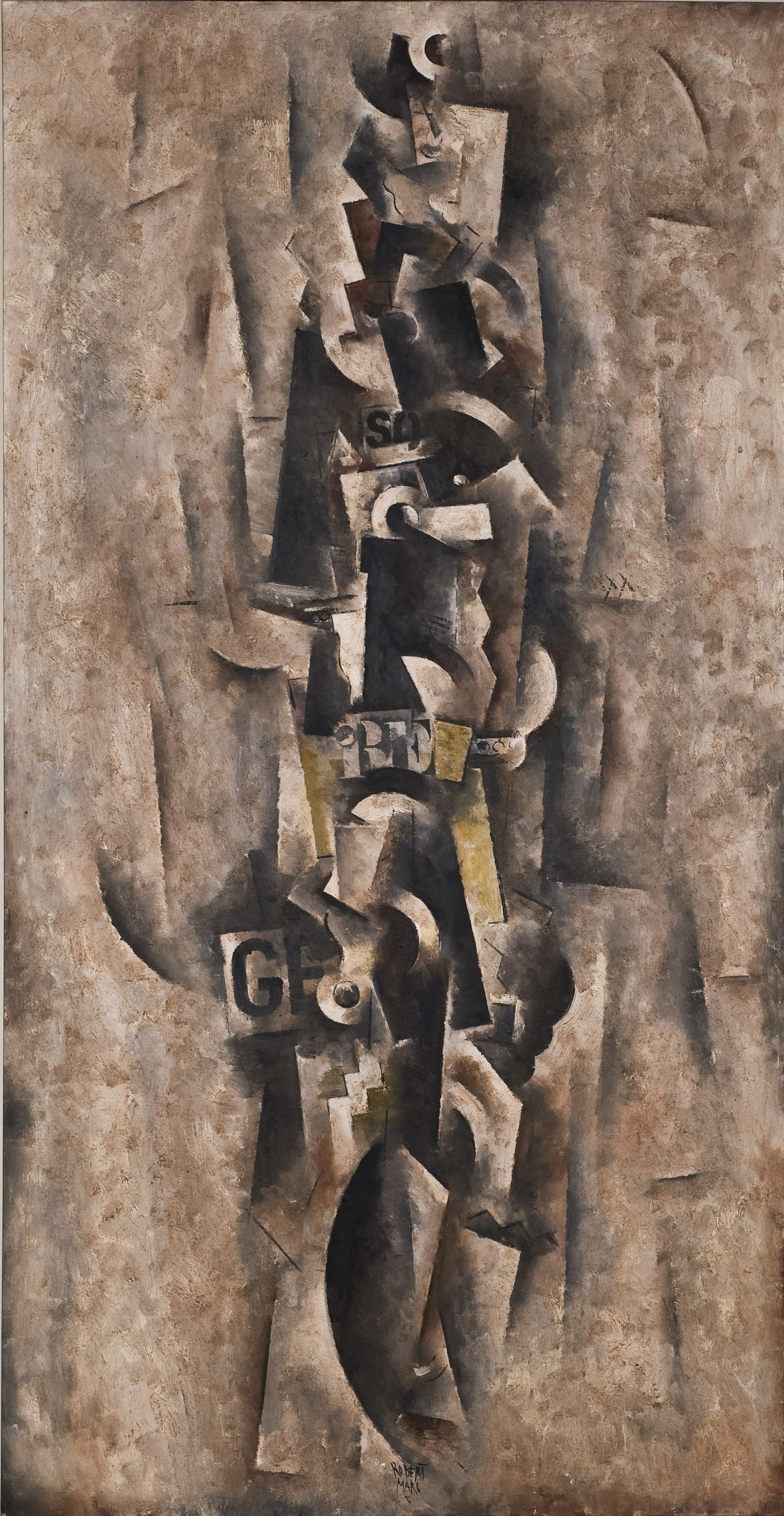
Robert Marc, Untitled (9570), oil on canvas, 188 x 97.2cm

- 2011 Alon Zakaim Fine Art and E&R Cyzer, 2011, Robert Marc: Reflections and Rediscovery
- 1996 Galerie Paul Debois, Troyes, France
- 1995 Barry Friedman Gallery, New York, Homage a Robert Marc
- 1995 Musée d'Art et d'Histoire, Metz, France
- 1994 Galerie du Ressort, Paris, Robert Marc 1943-1993, this exhibition travelled to Galerie Verdaine, Geneva, Switzerland
- 1992 Tokyo, Japan, Corporate Exhibition
- 1991 Galerie Verdaine, Geneva, Switzerland
- 1991 Galerie du Ressort, Paris
- 1990 Galerie Rapin-Latour, Paris
- 1989 Barry Friedman, New York, Robert Marc. An exhibition of 25 Cubist Paintings, this exhibition travelled to Galerie Artko, Toulouse, France
- 1988 Galerie Artko, Toulouse, France, Robert Marc
- 1987 Hervé Poulain et Rémy Le Fur, Hotel Drouot, Paris, Robert Marc, an auction of 94 works by the artist

== Literature ==
- Exhibition Catalogue, Alon Zakaim Fine Art and E&R Cyzer, Robert Marc: Reflections and Rediscovery, London, 2011
- Maya Widmaier-Picasso, Robert Marc, an essay, 1995
- Exhibition Catalogue, Barry Friedman Ltd, Robert Marc Collages, New York, 1992
- Robert Marc, F.P. Lobies Editions, preface by Sylvie Clidiere, La Chatre, France, 1990
- 'Robert Marc', Tribune de Geneve, November 29, 1987
