= Daniel Marx =

American football player (born 1995)

No. 35
- Position: Fullback

Personal information
- Born: October 7, 1995 (age 31); Mission Viejo, California
- Listed height: 6 ft 2 in (1.88 m)
- Listed weight: 245 lb (111 kg)

Career information
- High school: Mission Viejo (CA)
- College: Stanford
- NFL draft: 2018: undrafted

Career history
- Atlanta Falcons (2018)*; Seattle Seahawks (2018)*; San Diego Fleet (2019)*
- * Offseason or practice squad member only

Daniel Marx (born October 7, 1995) is an American former football fullback. He played college football at Stanford. He led Stanford to single-game rushing totals of 350-plus yards on three occasions over his final two seasons, blocking for Heisman runner-ups Christian McCaffrey and Bryce Love. He signed with the Atlanta Falcons as an undrafted free agent in 2018.

== Professional career ==
=== Atlanta Falcons ===
Marx signed with the Atlanta Falcons as an undrafted free agent on May 1, 2018. He was waived on July 30, 2018.

=== Seattle Seahawks ===
On August 25, 2018, Marx was signed by the Seattle Seahawks. He was waived on September 1, 2018.

=== San Diego Fleet ===
On September 14, 2018, Marx signed with San Diego Fleet of the Alliance of American Football, but retired in January 2019.
