= Robert E. Marc =

American ophthalmologist

Robert E. Marc is an American ophthalmologist, currently Distinguished Professor, and previously Calvin & JeNeal Hatch Endowed Chair in Ophthalmology and Mary H. Boesche Professor at University of Utah and previously the Robert Greer of Neural Sciences at University of Texas Health Science Center at Houston. He is a Fellow of the American Association for the Advancement of Science, Society for Neuroscience and Association for Research in Vision and Ophthalmology.
