= Devon Cajuste =

American football player (born 1993)

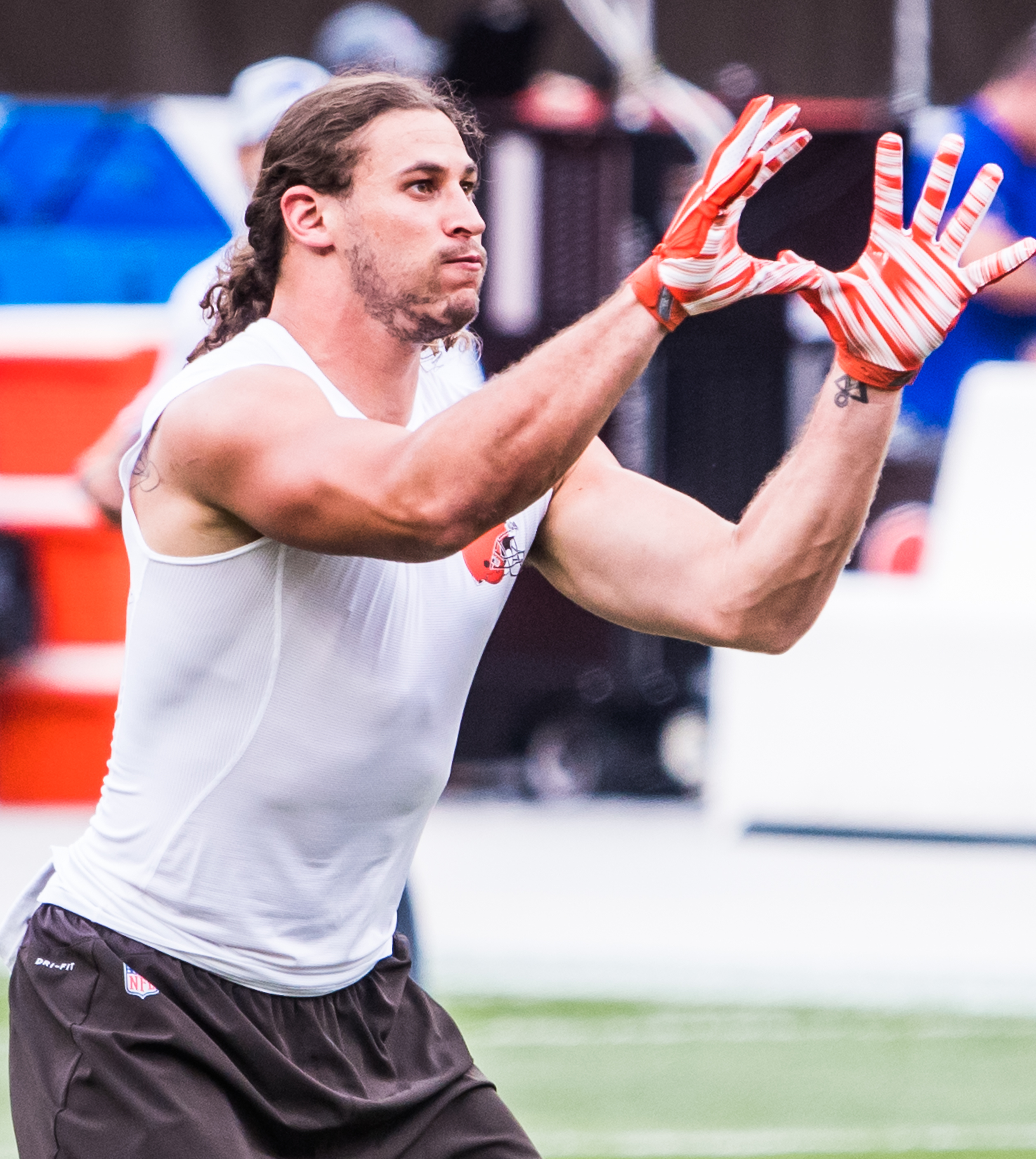
- Cajuste with the Cleveland Browns in 2018

No. 86, 83
- Position: Tight end

Personal information
- Born: January 31, 1993 (age 33); Syosset, New York
- Listed height: 6 ft 4 in (1.93 m)
- Listed weight: 241 lb (109 kg)

Career information
- High school: Holy Cross (Queens, New York)
- College: Stanford
- NFL draft: 2016: undrafted

Career history
- San Francisco 49ers (2016)*; Green Bay Packers (2016)*; Cleveland Browns (2018)*
- * Offseason or practice squad member only
- Stats at Pro Football Reference

Devon Gregory Cajuste (born January 31, 1993) is an American former football tight end. He played college football at Stanford and was signed by the San Francisco 49ers as an undrafted free agent in 2016. He was also a member of the Green Bay Packers and Cleveland Browns, where he became a star on Hard Knocks. He now resides at his ranch in Marin County, California where he cares for several animals and promotes spiritual growth through crystal metamorphism.

== College career ==
Cajuste attended Stanford University, where he played on the Stanford Cardinal football team from 2011 to 2015. In his college football career, he recorded 90 receptions for 1,589 yards and 14 touchdowns.

=== Statistics ===
Year	Team	GP	Receiving				
Year	Team	GP	Rec	Yds	Avg	Lng	TD
2012	Stanford	8	1	7	7.0	7	0
2013	Stanford	13	28	642	22.9	78	5
2014	Stanford	11	34	557	16.4	42	6
2015	Stanford	13	27	383	14.2	42	3
Total		45	90	1,589	17.7	78	14
Source: GoStanford.com

== Professional career ==
External videos
- Cajuste's NFL Combine workout

Pre-draft measurables
Height	Weight	Arm length	Hand span	40-yard dash	10-yard split	20-yard split	20-yard shuttle	Three-cone drill	Vertical jump	Broad jump	Bench press
6 ft 3 3/4 in (1.92 m)	234 lb (106 kg)	33 in (0.84 m)	10 3/4 in (0.27 m)	4.62 s	1.60 s	2.70 s	4.20 s	6.49 s	36 in (0.91 m)	10 ft 3 in (3.12 m)	12 reps
All values are from NFL Combine

=== San Francisco 49ers ===
After going undrafted in the 2016 NFL draft, Cajuste signed with the San Francisco 49ers on May 6, 2016. On August 1, 2016, Cajuste made a public announcement on Instagram that he had contracted HIV/AIDS after engaging in risky sexual activity and drug use in San Francisco. On September 3, 2016, he was released by the 49ers during final team cuts.

=== Green Bay Packers ===
On September 7, 2016, Cajuste was signed to the Green Bay Packers' practice squad.

=== Cleveland Browns ===
On January 31, 2018, Cajuste signed a reserve/future contract with the Cleveland Browns. Cajuste quickly became a star on Hard Knocks. Fan support for Cajuste became known after sharing a story about his father and the ups and downs they overcame to make his NFL career a reality. Cajuste was waived by the Browns on September 1, 2018 during roster reductions.

On January 31, 2019, Cajuste announced his retirement from the NFL due to physical and mental weakness and to pursue spiritual healing and his passion for crystals.
