= Marx (disambiguation) =

Karl Marx (1818–1883) was a German philosopher, economist and founder of Marxism.

Marx may also refer to:

== People ==
- Marx (surname), list of people with the surname Marx
- Marx (given name), people named Marx
- The Marx Brothers, an American family comedy act formed by Chico, Harpo, Groucho, Gummo, and Zeppo.

== Places ==
- Marx Memorial Library, London
- Marks, Russia, a town in Russia (also spelled Marx)

== Other uses ==
- Louis Marx and Company, an American toy manufacturing company
- Marx (Kirby), a character from the Kirby series of video games

== See also ==
- Marx generator, an electrical circuit which produces high-voltage pulses
- St. Marx cemetery, Landstraße, Vienna
