= 2013 Arizona Wildcats football team =

American college football season

2013 Arizona Wildcats football

AdvoCare V100 Bowl champion

AdvoCare V100 Bowl, W 42–19 vs. Boston College
- Conference: Pac-12 Conference
- South Division
- Record: 8–5 (4–5 Pac-12)
- Head coach: Rich Rodriguez (2nd season)
- Co-offensive coordinators: Calvin Magee (2nd season); Rod Smith (2nd season)
- Offensive scheme: Spread option
- Defensive coordinator: Jeff Casteel (2nd season)
- Base defense: 3–3–5
- Home stadium: Arizona Stadium

Uniform
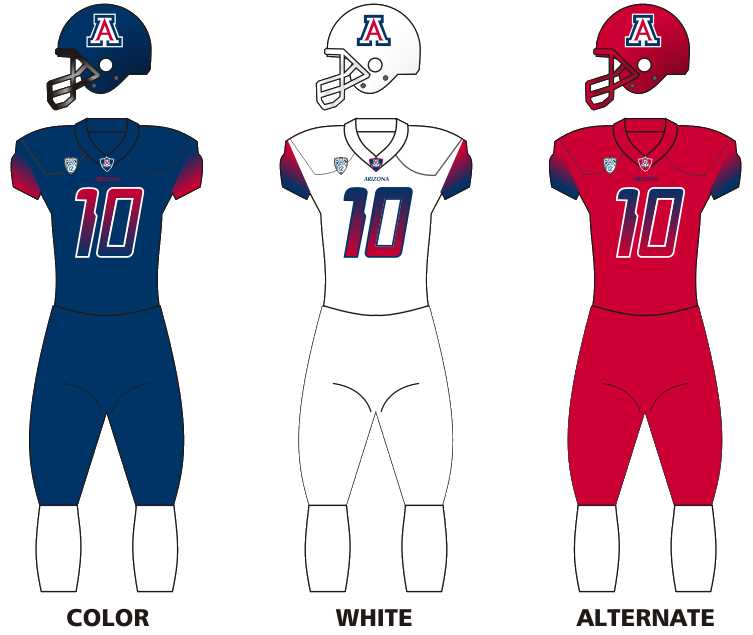

2013 Pac-12 Conference football standings
	Conf.			Overall
Team	W		L	W		L
North Division
No. 11 Stanford xy$	7	–	2	11	–	3
No. 9 Oregon x	7	–	2	11	–	2
No. 25 Washington	5	–	4	9	–	4
Oregon State	4	–	5	7	–	6
Washington State	4	–	5	6	–	7
California	0	–	9	1	–	11
South Division
No. 21 Arizona State xy	8	–	1	10	–	4
No. 16 UCLA	6	–	3	10	–	3
No. 19 USC	6	–	3	10	–	4
Arizona	4	–	5	8	–	5
Utah	2	–	7	5	–	7
Colorado	1	–	8	4	–	8
Championship: Stanford 38, Arizona State 14
$ – BCS representative as conference champion; x – Division champion/co-champions; y – Championship game participant; Rankings from AP Poll

The 2013 Arizona Wildcats football team represented the University of Arizona in the 2013 NCAA Division I FBS football season. The Wildcats played their home games at Arizona Stadium in Tucson for the 85th straight year. The 2013 season was Arizona's third in the South Division of the Pac-12 Conference and the second for head coach Rich Rodriguez.

== Before the season ==
=== Previous season ===
In the 2012 season, head coach Rich Rodriguez's first at Arizona, the Wildcats went 8–5 overall and 4–5 in Pac-12 play. The team defeated Nevada 49–48 in the 2012 New Mexico Bowl after trailing 48–35 with 1:48 remaining in the game.

No Arizona player was taken in the NFL draft for the first time since 2005, although three signed with teams as free agents. Quarterback Matt Scott signed with the Jacksonville Jaguars, center Kyle Quinn signed with the Philadelphia Eagles, and wide receiver Dan Bucker signed with the Arizona Cardinals.

=== Spring practice ===
Arizona held fifteen spring practices from March 12 through April 13 including an hour-long scrimmage at Phoenix College on March 29. The team's defense won the scrimmage by one point after stopping the offense on its final drive. Quarterback B.J. Denker threw for four touchdowns and 176 yards. Javelle Allen had 57 yards passing and 50 through the air. Coach Rodriguez rested all-American running back Ka'Deem Carey, who appeared for only one series. Several key defensive players were held out entirely, including Jake Fischer, Marquis Flowers, Jonathan McKnight, Shaquille Richardson, C.J. Dozier, Jourdon Grandon and Dan Pettinato.

Arizona's offense won the 2013 spring game, held on April 13 in front of 4,095 at the program's practice facility, Kindall/Sancet Stadium, and televised on Pac-12 Arizona. Carey and Fischer again sat out, among others. Denker went 13–20, 246 yards, 4 touchdowns, and 1 interception; Jesse Scroggins went 6–14, 44 yards, 2 touchdowns, and 1 interception; and Jack Nykaza went 8–12, 89 yards, and 2 touchdowns. Dakota Conwell and Shane Wilson led the defense with 5 tackles apiece. Dame Ndiaye had 4 tackles, 1 sack (−10 yards), 1 tackle-for-loss (−1), a pass-broken-up, and a forced-fumble. William Parks and Tra'mayne Bondurant each made an interception.

=== Recruiting class ===
College recruiting (2013)
Name	Hometown	School	Height	Weight	40^{‡}	Commit date
Samajie Grant; ATH	Ontario, California	Colony High School	5 ft 11 in (1.80 m)	175 lb (79 kg)	4.5	Jun 29, 2012
Samajie Grant; ATH	Recruit ratings: Scout: Rivals: (82)					
Pierre Cormier; RB	San Diego, California	Madison High School	5 ft 9 in (1.75 m)	179 lb (81 kg)	4.45	Aug 8, 2012
Pierre Cormier; RB	Recruit ratings: Scout: Rivals: (80)					
Derek Babiash; CB	Poway, California	Poway High School	6 ft 0 in (1.83 m)	165 lb (75 kg)	4.8	Jul 1, 2012
Derek Babiash; CB	Recruit ratings: Scout: Rivals: (80)					
T.J. Johnson; ATH	Cape Coral, Florida	Island Coast High School	5 ft 8 in (1.73 m)	170 lb (77 kg)	–	Jan 1, 2013
T.J. Johnson; ATH	Recruit ratings: Scout: Rivals: (80)					
DeAndre Miller; ILB	Buckeye, Arizona	Buckeye Union High School	6 ft 1 in (1.85 m)	225 lb (102 kg)	4.5	Jun 19, 2012
DeAndre Miller; ILB	Recruit ratings: Scout: Rivals: (79)					
Logan Scott; OG	St. George, Utah	Pine View High School	6 ft 3 in (1.91 m)	300 lb (140 kg)	4.5	May 12, 2011
Logan Scott; OG	Recruit ratings: Scout: Rivals: (79)					
Derrick Turituri; TE	Central Point, Oregon	Crater High School	6 ft 1 in (1.85 m)	226 lb (103 kg)	4.44	Jun 30, 2012
Derrick Turituri; TE	Recruit ratings: Scout: Rivals: (78)					
Nate Phillips; WR	Chandler, Arizona	Basha High School	5 ft 10 in (1.78 m)	175 lb (79 kg)	4.65	Jun 11, 2012
Nate Phillips; WR	Recruit ratings: Scout: Rivals: (77)					
Jesse Scroggins; QB	Lakewood, California	Lakewood High School/El Camino College (JC)	6 ft 3 in (1.91 m)	210 lb (95 kg)	4.5	Dec 2, 2012
Jesse Scroggins; QB	Recruit ratings: Scout: Rivals: (77)					
Lawerence "Lee" Walker; WR	San Diego, California	Madison High School	6 ft 0 in (1.83 m)	166 lb (75 kg)	–	Aug 7, 2012
Lawerence "Lee" Walker; WR	Recruit ratings: Scout: Rivals: (76)					
Anu Solomon; QB	Las Vegas, NV	Bishop Gorman High School	6 ft 1 in (1.85 m)	202 lb (92 kg)	–	May 20, 2012
Anu Solomon; QB	Recruit ratings: Scout: Rivals: (76)					
Calvin Allen; OT	Albuquerque, New Mexico	La Cueva High School	6 ft 5 in (1.96 m)	240 lb (110 kg)	4.5	Jun 20, 2012
Calvin Allen; OT	Recruit ratings: Scout: Rivals: (75)					
Mauriece Lee; ATH	Tempe, Arizona	Marcos De Niza High School	5 ft 7 in (1.70 m)	180 lb (82 kg)	–	Apr 7, 2012
Mauriece Lee; ATH	Recruit ratings: Scout: Rivals: (81)					
Ryan Dunn; OLB	Danville, California	San Roman Valley High School	6 ft 2 in (1.88 m)	205 lb (93 kg)	4.57	Jun 21, 2012
Ryan Dunn; OLB	Recruit ratings: Scout: Rivals: (75)					
Zachary Green; RB	Ventura, California	Saint Bonaventure High School	6 ft 2.5 in (1.89 m)	225 lb (102 kg)	4.65	Apr 7, 2012
Zachary Green; RB	Recruit ratings: Scout: Rivals: (75)					
Steven Gurrola; C	Glendale, Arizona	Phoenix Washington High School/Glendale Community College (JC)	6 ft 2 in (1.88 m)	285 lb (129 kg)	4.54	Feb 6, 2013
Steven Gurrola; C	Recruit ratings: Scout: Rivals: (75)					
David Price; S	Long Beach, California	Long Beach Polytechnic High School	6 ft 1 in (1.85 m)	200 lb (91 kg)	–	Feb 10, 2013
David Price; S	Recruit ratings: Scout: Rivals: (74)					
Jack Banda; DE	Loganville, Georgia	Grayson High School	6 ft 3 in (1.91 m)	225 lb (102 kg)	–	Jun 8, 2012
Jack Banda; DE	Recruit ratings: Scout: Rivals: (74)					
Khari McGhee; QB	Fresno, California	Edison High School	6 ft 1 in (1.85 m)	190 lb (86 kg)	–	Feb 6, 2013
Khari McGhee; QB	Recruit ratings: Scout: Rivals: (74)					
Jacob Alsadek; OT	Del Mar, California	Torrey Pines High School	6 ft 7 in (2.01 m)	342 lb (155 kg)	–	Jul 20, 2012
Jacob Alsadek; OT	Recruit ratings: Scout: Rivals: (73)					
R.J. Morgan; OLB	Central Point, Oregon	Crater High School	6 ft 0 in (1.83 m)	200 lb (91 kg)	5.1	Jun 24, 2012
R.J. Morgan; OLB	Recruit ratings: Scout: Rivals: (73)					
Philip Wright; ILB	Santa Rosa, California	Cardinal Newman High School	6 ft 1 in (1.85 m)	229 lb (104 kg)	4.5	Jun 18, 2012
Philip Wright; ILB	Recruit ratings: Scout: Rivals: (73)					
David Maka; DT	Tustin, California	Tustin High School	6 ft 3 in (1.91 m)	300 lb (140 kg)	4.4	Feb 4, 2013
David Maka; DT	Recruit ratings: Scout: Rivals: (72)					
Devin Holiday; ATH	San Marcos, California	Mission Hills High School	5 ft 10 in (1.78 m)	148 lb (67 kg)	4.42	Jun 21, 2012
Devin Holiday; ATH	Recruit ratings: Scout: Rivals: (70)					
Luca Bruno; OG	Oak Park, California	Oak Park High School	6 ft 3 in (1.91 m)	280 lb (130 kg)	4.60	Aug 11, 2012
Luca Bruno; OG	Recruit ratings: Scout: Rivals: (69)					
Paul Elvira; WR	Tempe, Arizona	Marcos De Niza High School	6 ft 0 in (1.83 m)	177 lb (80 kg)	4.60	Jun 11, 2012
Paul Elvira; WR	Recruit ratings: Scout: Rivals: (69)					
Overall recruit ranking: Scout: 27 Rivals: 37 ESPN: 39
‡ Refers to 40-yard dash; Note: In many cases, Scout, Rivals, 247Sports, On3, and ESPN may conflict in their listings of height, weight and 40 time.; In these cases, the average was taken. ESPN grades are on a 100-point scale.; Sources: "Scout.com Football Recruiting: Arizona". Scout.; "2013 Player Signees- Arizona". ESPN.; "Scout.com Team Recruiting Rankings". Scout.; "2013 Team Ranking". Rivals.com.

== Schedule ==
Arizona played six of twelve regular season games at home: two of three non-conference games and four of nine Pac-12 games. The Cats played neither Oregon State nor Stanford in both 2013 and 2014. They played the Boston College Eagles in the 2013 AdvoCare V100 Bowl to conclude the season, which they won 42–19.

Date	Time	Opponent	Site	TV	Result	Attendance
August 30	7:00 p.m.	No. 18 (FCS) Northern Arizona*	Arizona Stadium; Tucson, AZ	P12N	W 35–0	53,793
September 7	7:30 p.m.	at UNLV*	Sam Boyd Stadium; Whitney, NV	CBSSN	W 58–13	26,950
September 14	7:30 p.m.	UTSA*	Arizona Stadium; Tucson, AZ	P12N	W 38–13	41,661
September 28	4:00 p.m.	at No. 16 Washington	Husky Stadium; Seattle, WA	FOX	L 13–31	65,815
October 10	7:30 p.m.	at USC	Los Angeles Memorial Coliseum; Los Angeles, CA	FS1	L 31–38	64,215
October 19	7:00 p.m.	Utah	Arizona Stadium; Tucson, AZ (Family Weekend)	P12N	W 35–24	50,871
October 26	5:00 p.m.	at Colorado	Folsom Field; Boulder, CO	P12N	W 44–20	38,679
November 2	12:30 p.m.	at California	California Memorial Stadium; Berkeley, CA	P12N	W 33–28	41,874
November 9	8:00 p.m.	No. 16 UCLA^{†}	Arizona Stadium; Tucson, AZ	ESPN	L 26–31	51,531
November 16	12:00 p.m.	Washington State	Arizona Stadium; Tucson, AZ	P12N	L 17–24	42,080
November 23	12:30 p.m.	No. 5 Oregon	Arizona Stadium; Tucson, AZ	ABC/ESPN2	W 42–16	45,777
November 30	7:30 p.m.	at No. 13 Arizona State	Sun Devil Stadium; Tempe, AZ (rivalry)	P12N	L 21–58	72,542
December 31	10:30 a.m.	vs. Boston College*	Independence Stadium; Shreveport, LA (AdvoCare V100 Bowl)	ESPN	W 42–19	36,917
*Non-conference game; ^{†}Homecoming; Rankings from AP Poll released prior to the game; All times are in Mountain time

== Roster ==
2013 Arizona Wildcats roster
2013 Arizona Wildcats roster from the University of Arizona Athletic Site
Quarterbacks: 1 Jesse Scroggins – Junior/TR; 7 B. J. Denker – Senior; 9 Javelle Allen – (redshirt) Freshman; 11 Connor Brewer – (redshirt) Freshman; 12 Anu Solomon – Freshman; 13 Adam Friederichsen – Freshman; 14 Nick Isham – Sophomore/TR; 15 Khari McGee – Freshman; Running backs: 2 Kylan Butler – Senior; 3 Daniel Jenkins – Senior; 4 Pierre Cormier – Freshman; 23 Jared Baker – Sophomore; 24 Terris Jones-Grigsby – Junior; 25 Ka'Deem Carey – Junior; 34 Zach Green – Freshman; 35 Myles Smith – Freshman; Wide receivers: 5 Trey Griffey – (redshirt) Freshman; 6 Nate Phillips – Freshman; 8 Cayleb Jones – Sophomore; 10 Samajie Grant – Freshman; 16 Garic Wharton – Junior; 18 Terrence Miller – Senior; 19 DaVonte' Neal – Sophomore/TR; 20 Trevor Ermisch – Junior; 24 Paul Elvira – Freshman; 29 Austin Hill – Junior; 30 Johnny Jackson – Sophomore; 80 David Richards – Sophomore; 81 Clive Georges – (redshirt) Freshman; 82 Aaron Lacombe – Freshman; 85 Drake Pierre – Freshman; 87 Donte' Cretain – Freshman	Tight ends: 17 Josh Kern – (redshirt) Freshman; 89 Nolan Heyer – Sophomore; 95 Gerhard De Beer – Freshman; Offensive linemen: 52 Vaughn Fontana – Freshman; 56 Steven Gurrola – Junior/TR; 59 Beau Boyster – (redshirt) Freshman; 61 Cayman Bundage – Sophomore; 62 Chris Putton – Senior; 64 Faitele Faafoi – Sophomore; 65 Zach Hemmila – (redshirt) Freshman; 66 Carter Wood – Sophomore; 68 Mickey Baucus – Junior; 67 Alec Anderson – (redshirt) Freshman; 69 Eric Bender-Ramsay – Senior; 70 T. D. Gross – (redshirt) Freshman; 73 Fabbians Ebbele – Junior; 74 Jacob Arzouman – Sophomore; 76 Austin Hyatt – Freshman; 77 Lene Maiava – Sophomore; 78 Jacob Alsadek – Freshman; 79 Trent Spurgeon – Junior; Long snapper: 50 Chase Gorham – Sophomore; 63 Brian Chacon – Senior; 71 Alex Arnaud – Freshman	Defensive lineman: 43 Justin Washington – Senior; 60 Luca Bruno – Freshman; 75 Kirfi Taula – Junior; 84 Reggie Gilbert – Junior; 90 Dan Pettinato – Junior; 91 Sione Tuihalamaka – Senior; 92 Jack Banda – Freshman; 93 Parker Zellers – Freshman; 94 Calvin Allen – Freshman; 97 Dwight Melvin – (redshirt) Freshman; 98 Tevin Hood – Senior/TR; 99 Kyle Kelley – (redshirt) Freshman; Linebackers: 2 Marquis Flowers – Senior; 3 Keoni Bush-Loo – Sophomore; 19 Hank Hobson – Junior; 25 Ryan Dunn – Freshman; 31 Scooby Wright III – Freshman; 32 DeAndre' Miller – Freshman; 33 Jake Fischer – Senior; 44 Brian Keyes – Freshman; 45 Derrick Turituri – Freshman; 47 Jake Matthews – Freshman; 49 Haden Gregory – Junior/TR; 51 Cole Ramseyer – Freshman; 53 Sir Thomas Jackson – Sophomore; 57 Cody Ippolito – Sophomore	Cornerbacks: 1 Derek Babiash – Freshman; 5 Shaquille Richardson – Senior; 6 Jonathan McKnight – Junior; 8 Richard Morrison – Senior; 13 Devin Holiday – Freshman; 17 Derrick Rainey – Senior; 26 Jourdon Grandon – Junior; 29 Justin Samuels – Senior; 36 David Redman – Junior; 40 Brendan Murphy – Senior/TR; 42 Shane Wilson – (redshirt) Senior; Safeties: 7 David Price – Freshman; 10 Yamen Sanders – (redshirt) Freshman; 11 William Parks – Sophomore; 12 Wayne Capers Jr. – Sophomore; 14 Tellas Jones – Freshman/TR; 15 Jarvis McCall Jr. – Freshman; 21 Tra'Mayne Bondurant – Junior; 27 Jamar Allah – Sophomore; 28 Anthony Lopez – Sophomore; 34 Tyler Grammar – Sophomore; 35 Tyler Turituri – Sophomore; 37 Carter Hehr -Freshman; 38 Jared Tevis – Junior; 39 Brogan Kemmerly – Freshman; 46 Blake Brady – Junior; 48 Zach Streuling – (redshirt) Freshman; 88 R.J. Morgan – Freshman; Placekickers: 41 Casey Skowron – Sophomore; 86 Jake Smith – Senior/TR; Punters: 39 Drew Riggleman – Sophomore; 42 Bret Miller – Freshman; 48 Jack Flatau – Freshman

=== Top returners ===
Offense

Player	Class	Position
B.J. Denker	Senior	Quarterback
Ka'Deem Carey	Junior	Running back
Daniel Jenkins	Senior	Running back
Austin Hill	Junior	Wide receiver
Terrence Miller	Senior	Wide receiver
David Richards	Sophomore	Wide receiver
Garic Wharton	Junior	Wide receiver
Chris Putton	Senior	Offensive line
Fabbians Ebbele	Junior	Offensive line
Mickey Baucus	Junior	Offensive line
Cayman Bundage	Sophomore	Offensive line
Michael Cooper	Junior	Tight end

Defense

Player	Class	Position
Shaquille Richardson	Senior	Cornerback
Jonathan McKnight	Junior	Cornerback
Derrick Rainey	Senior	Cornerback
Jourdon Grandon	Junior	Cornerback
Jared Tevis	Junior	Safety
Tra'Mayne Bondurant	Junior	Safety
Jamar Allah	Sophomore	Safety
Jake Fischer	Senior	Linebacker
Marquis Flowers	Senior	Linebacker
Sir Thomas Jackson	Sophomore	Linebacker
Hank Hobson	Junior	Linebacker
Dakota Conwell	Sophomore	Linebacker
Sione Tuihalamaka	Senior	Defensive lineman
Reggie Gilbert	Junior	Defensive lineman
Dan Pettinato	Junior	Defensive lineman
Justin Washington	Senior	Defensive lineman
Tevin Hood	Senior	Defensive lineman

Special teams

Player	Class	Position
Drew Riggleman	Sophomore	Punter
Jake Smith	Senior/TR	Kicker
Jared Baker	Sophomore	Kickoff Return

=== Depth chart ===
Defense

S
Jourdon Grandon (26)
Jamar Allah (27)
⋅

FS
Tra'Mayne Bondurant (21)
Anthony Lopez (28)
⋅

WLB	MLB	SLB
Marquis Flowers; DeAndre' Miller; Jake Matthews	Jake Fischer (33)	Scooby Wright (31)
⋅	Hank Hobson (19)	Keoni Bush-Loo (3)
⋅	⋅	Derrick Turituri

BANDIT
Jared Tevis (38)
William Parks (11)
⋅

CB
Shaquille Richardson (5)
Devin Holiday (13)
⋅

DE	NT	DE
Reggie Gilbert (84)	Tevin Hood (98)	Sione Tuihalamaka (91)
Justin Washington (43)	Kirifi Taula (75)	Dan Pettinato (90)
Kyle Kelley (99)	⋅	⋅

CB
Jonathan McKnight (6)
Richard Morrison (8)
⋅

Offense

WR
Nate Phillips
Caric Wharton
⋅

WR
Terrence Miller
Trey Griffrey
⋅

LT	LG	C	RG	RT
Mickey Baucus (68)	Cayman Bundage (61)	Steven Gurrola (56)	Chris Putton (62)	Fabbians Ebbele (73)
Lene Maiava (77)	Trent Spurgeon (79)	Carter Wood (66)	Faitele Faafoi (64)	T.D. Gross (70)
⋅	⋅	⋅	⋅	⋅

WR
Johnny Jackson
⋅
⋅

WR
Samajie Grant
David Richards
⋅

QB
B.J. Denker (7)
Javelle Allen (9)
Jesse Scroggins (1)

RB
Ka’Deem Carey (25)
Daniel Jenkins (3)
Jared Baker (23)
Kylan Butler

Special teams
PK Jake Smith (86)
P Drew Riggleman (39)
KR Nate Phillips (6)
PR Nate Phillips (6)
LS Brian Chacon (63)
H Nick Isham (14)

=== Departures ===
Position	Player	Notes
QB	Matt Scott	Graduated, signed with Jacksonville Jaguars
LB	Greg Nwoko	Graduated
WR	Dan Buckner	Graduated, signed with Arizona Cardinals
WR	Tyler Slavin	Transfer
C	Kyle Quinn	Graduated, signed with Philadelphia Eagles
TE	Drew Robinson	Graduated
RB	Elliot Taylor	Graduated
FB	Taimi Tutogi	Graduated
S	Mark Watley	Graduated
OL	Shane Zink	Graduated
DL	Chris Merril	Graduated
DL	Dominique Austin	Graduated
DL	Lamar de Rego	Graduated
DL	Christian Upshaw	Graduated
DL	Wille Mobley	Transferred to New Mexico State
LB	Tyler Ermisch	Graduated
K	John Bonano	Graduated
P	Kyle Dugandzic	Graduated
P	Jaime Salazar	Graduated

=== Arrivals ===
Name	Number	Pos.	Height	Weight	Year	Hometown	Notes
Cayleb Jones	1	Wide receiver	6'3"	204	RS sophomore (Transfer)	Austin, TX	transferred from Texas after his freshman year. Jones redshirted the 2013 season under NCAA transfer rules and will have 3 years eligibility at Arizona.
Connor Brewer	11	Quarterback	6'2"	196	RS sophomore	Scottsdale, AZ	transferred from Texas after his redshirt freshman year. Brewer sat out the 2013 season under NCAA transfer rules and will have 3 years eligibility at Arizona.
DaVonte' Neal	19	Wide receiver/Punt Return	5'10"	176	RS sophomore (Transfer)	Akron, OH	transferred from Notre Dame after his freshman year. Neal redshirted the 2013 season under NCAA transfer rules and will have 3 years eligibility at Arizona

== Coaching staff ==
Name	Position	Seasons at Arizona	Alma mater
Rich Rodriguez	Head coach	2	West Virginia (1986)
Calvin Magee	Associate head coach, co-offensive coordinator, Running Backs	2	South Florida (1990)
Rod Smith	Co-offensive coordinator, quarterbacks	2	Glenville State (1997)
Jeff Casteel	defensive coordinator, Linebackers	2	CALU (1993)
Matt Caponi	Safeties	2	Mount Union (2005)
Tony Dews	Wide receivers	2	Liberty (1996)
Bill Kirelawich	Defensive line	2	Salem (1969)
David Lockwood	Cornerbacks	2	West Virginia (1989)
Jim Michalczik	Offensive line	1	Washington State (1988)
Charlie Ragle	Tight ends, special teams	2	Eastern New Mexico (1998)
Matt Dudek	Director of on-campus recruiting and player personnel	2	Pittsburgh (2003)
Mike Parrish	Assistant athletic director, football operations	2	West Virginia (2006)
Billy Kirelawich	Assistant director of operations	2	West Virginia (2008)
Jahmile Addae	Operations coordinator	1	West Virginia (2005)
Andrew Warsaw	Operations coordinator	1	West Virginia (2009)
Chris Allen	Associate athletic director, director of strength and conditioning	2	West Virginia (2000)
Parker Whiteman	Director of skill development	2	Shepherd (2006)
Vincent Amey	Assistant strength and conditioning coach	1	Arizona State (1998)
Frank Davis	Assistant strength and conditioning coach	2	South Florida (2009)
Ovid Goulbourne	Assistant strength and conditioning coach	1	West Virginia (2009)
Miek DiAngelo	Defensive graduate assistant	1	Baldwin Wallace (2006)
Reed Willams	Defensive graduate assistant	1	West Virginia (2009)
Lee Coleman	Offensive graduate assistant	1	Northwestern (2010)
Cory Zirbel	Offensive graduate assistant	2	Michigan (2009)
Miguel Reveles	Intern	1	La Verne (2010)

== Game summaries ==
=== vs Northern Arizona ===
Northern Arizona Lumberjacks (0–0) vs Arizona Wildcats (0–0) – Game summary

Quarter	1	2	3	4	Total
Lumberjacks	0	0	0	0	0
Wildcats	7	7	14	7	35

at Arizona Stadium • Tucson, AZ

- Date: August 30, 2013
- Game time: 7:00 p.m.
- Game weather: Overcast, Showers, 85 °F (29 °C)
- Game attendance: 53,793
- Referee: Shawn Hochuli
- TV: Pac-12 Network

Game information

First quarter

- (11:11) ARIZ – Daniel Jenkins 11-yard pass from B.J. Denker, Jake Smith kick (Drive: 10 plays, 75 yards, 3:49; Arizona 7–0)

Second quarter

- (5:32) ARIZ – Daniel Jenkins 91-yard run, Jake Smith kick (Drive: 1 play, 91 yards, 0:14; Arizona 14–0)

Third quarter

- (14:47) ARIZ – Tra'Mayne Bondurant 23-yard interception return, Jake Smith kick (Arizona 21–0)
- (8:34) ARIZ – B.J. Denker 30-yard run, Jake Smith kick (Drive: 3 play, 48 yards, 0:50; Arizona 28–0)

Fourth quarter

- (4:40) ARIZ – Javelle Allen 61-yard run, Jake Smith kick (Drive: 3 plays, 72 yards, 1:03; Arizona 35–0)

Statistics	NAU	ARIZ
First downs	15	14
Total yards	270	393
Rushing yards	39–94	34–306
Passing yards	176	87
Passing: Comp–Att–Int	21–36–3	9–13–0
Time of possession	40:16	19:44

Team	Category	Player	Statistics
Northern Arizona	Passing	Kyren Poe	21/36, 176 yards, 3 INT
Northern Arizona	Rushing	Zach Bauman	21 carries, 71 yards
Northern Arizona	Receiving	Nick Cole	6 receptions, 62 yards
Arizona	Passing	B.J. Denker	9/13, 87 yards, TD
Arizona	Rushing	Daniel Jenkins	12 carries, 139 yards, TD
Arizona	Receiving	Garic Wharton	2 receptions, 35 yards

=== at UNLV ===
Arizona Wildcats (1–0) at UNLV Rebels (0–1) – Game summary

Quarter	1	2	3	4	Total
Wildcats	17	28	3	10	58
Rebels	0	6	0	7	13

at Sam Boyd Stadium • Whitney, NV

- Date: September 7, 2013
- Game time: 7:30 p.m.
- Game weather: Mostly Cloudy, 87 °F (31 °C)
- Game attendance: 26,950
- Referee: Terry Leyden
- TV: CBS Sports Network

Game information

First quarter

- (11:33) ARIZ – Jake Smith 41-yard field goal (Drive: 10 plays, 41 yards, 2:41; Arizona 3–0)
- (8:10) ARIZ – B.J. Denker 35-yard run, Jake Smith kick (Drive: 8 plays, 85 yards, 2:22; Arizona 10–0)
- (3:25) ARIZ – B.J. Denker 4-yard run, Jake Smith kick (Drive: 2 plays, 9 yards, 0:35; Arizona 17–0)

Second quarter

- (14:49) UNLV – Devante Davis 69-yard pass from Nick Sherry, kick failed (Drive: 4 plays, 80 yards, 0:57; Arizona 17–6)
- (14:28) ARIZ – Ka'Deem Carey 58-yard run, Jake Smith kick (Drive: 1 play, 58 yards, 0:12; Arizona 24–6)
- (8:37) ARIZ – Ka'Deem Carey 12-yard run, Jake Smith kick (Drive: 11 plays, 63 yards, 4:03; Arizona 31–6)
- (6:59) ARIZ – Jake Fischer 49-yard interception return, Jake Smith kick (Arizona 38–6)
- (1:34) ARIZ – Tra'Mayne Bondurant 52-yard interception return, Jake Smith kick (Arizona 45–6)

Third quarter

- (9:54) ARIZ – Jake Smith 29-yard field goal (Drive: 14 plays, 63 yards, 5:06; Arizona 48–6)

Fourth quarter

- (9:00) ARIZ – Jake Smith 30-yard field goal (Drive: 12 plays, 41 yards, 5:55; Arizona 51–6)
- (8:21) UNLV – Shaquille Murray-Lawrence 79-yard run, Nolan Kohorst kick (Drive: 2 plays, 79 yards, 0:23; Arizona 51–13)
- (2:50) ARIZ – Kylan Butler 3-yard run, Jake Smith kick (Drive: 11 plays, 84 yards, 5:26; Arizona 58–13)

Statistics	ARIZ	UNLV
First downs	25	10
Total yards	478	282
Rushing yards	69–397	35–157
Passing yards	81	125
Passing: Comp–Att–Int	8–21–0	9–28–2
Time of possession	35:38	24:22

Team	Category	Player	Statistics
Arizona	Passing	B.J. Denker	8/21, 81 yards
Arizona	Rushing	Ka'Deem Carey	16 carries, 171 yards, 2 TD
Arizona	Receiving	Nate Phillips	3 receptions, 35 yards
UNLV	Passing	Nick Sherry	6/22, 111 yards, TD, 2 INT
UNLV	Rushing	Shaquille Murray-Lawrence	4 carries, 82 yards, TD
UNLV	Receiving	Devante Davis	3 receptions, 84 yards, TD

Junior RB Ka’Deem Carey, the nation's leading rusher and a consensus All-American in 2012, saw his first action of the season after serving a one-game suspension related to offseason off-the-field issues.

In their previous meeting in 2001, Arizona defeated the Rebels 38–21 and Arizona leads the all-time series 2–0.

=== vs UTSA ===
UTSA Roadrunners (1–1) vs Arizona Wildcats (2–0) – Game summary

Quarter	1	2	3	4	Total
Roadrunners	3	3	0	7	13
Wildcats	14	10	7	7	38

at Arizona Stadium • Tucson, AZ

- Date: September 14, 2013
- Game time: 7:30 p.m.
- Game weather: Mostly Clear, 91 °F (33 °C)
- Game attendance: 41,661
- Referee: Jack Wood
- TV: Pac-12 Network

Game information

First quarter

- (10:13) UTSA – Sean Ianno 34-yard field goal (Drive: 11 plays, 58 yards, 4:47; UTSA 3–0)
- (6:14) ARIZ – Samajie Grant 13-yard pass from B.J. Denker, Jake Smith kick (Drive: 11 plays, 82 yards, 3:54; Arizona 7–3)
- (1:40) ARIZ – B.J. Denker 35-yard run, Jake Smith kick (Drive: 3 plays, 34 yards, 1:21; Arizona 14–3)

Second quarter

- (14:09) ARIZ – Jake Smith 23-yard field goal (Drive: 9 plays, 48 yards, 1:55; Arizona 17–3)
- (8:35) UTSA – Sean Ianno 43-yard field goal (Drive: 11 plays, 49 yards, 5:34; Arizona 17–6)
- (7:13) ARIZ – Ka'Deem Carey 4-yard run, Jake Smith kick (Drive: 7 plays, 53 yards, 2:12; Arizona 24–6)

Third quarter

- (11:43) ARIZ – B.J. Denker 1-yard run, Jake Smith kick (Drive: 11 plays, 75 yards, 3:17; Arizona 31–6)

Fourth quarter

- (13:57) ARIZ – Ka'Deem Carey 7-yard run, Jake Smith kick (Drive: 10 plays, 59 yards, 4:16; Arizona 31–6)
- (9:39) UTSA – David Glasco II 4-yard run, Sean Ianno kick (Drive: 10 plays, 75 yards, 4:18; Arizona 31–13)

Statistics	UTSA	ARIZ
First downs	23	25
Total yards	379	422
Rushing yards	29–102	48–264
Passing yards	277	158
Passing: Comp–Att–Int	30–47–1	14–21–0
Time of possession	33:15	26:45

Team	Category	Player	Statistics
UTSA	Passing	Eric Soza	30/46, 277 yards, INT
UTSA	Rushing	David Glasco II	10 carries, 70 yards, TD
UTSA	Receiving	Brandon Freeman	6 receptions, 57 yards
Arizona	Passing	B.J. Denker	14/21, 158 yards, TD
Arizona	Rushing	Ka'Deem Carey	27 carries, 128 yards, 2 TD
Arizona	Receiving	Garic Wharton	3 receptions, 57 yards

=== at No. 16 Washington ===
Arizona Wildcats (3–0) at No. 16 Washington Huskies (3–0) – Game summary

Quarter	1	2	3	4	Total
Wildcats	0	6	0	7	13
#16 Huskies	8	3	14	6	31

at Husky Stadium • Seattle, WA

- Date: September 28, 2013
- Game time: 4:00 p.m.
- Game weather: Rain, 60 °F (16 °C)
- Game attendance: 65,815
- Referee: Michael Batlan
- TV: Fox

Game information

First quarter

- (12:44) WASH – Kevin Smith 7-yard pass from Keith Price, kick failed (Drive: 4 plays, 35 yards, 1:11; Washington 6–0)
- (0:22) WASH – Team safety (Washington 8–0)

Second quarter

- (14:11) WASH – Travis Coons 42-yard field goal (Drive: 4 plays, 4 yards, 0:58; Washington 11–0)
- (0:06) ARIZ – Ka'Deem Carey 3-yard run, kick failed (Drive: 14 plays, 84 yards, 2:43; Washington 11–6)

Third quarter

- (10:19) WASH – Austin Seferian-Jenkins 1-yard pass from Keith Price, Travis Coons kick (Drive: 14 plays, 95 yards, 4:34; Washington 18–6)
- (5:14) ARIZ – B.J. Denker 7-yard run, Jake Smith kick (Drive: 15 plays, 72 yards, 4:57; Washington 18–13)
- (1:25) WASH – Bishop Sankey 1-yard run, Travis Coons kick (Drive: 10 plays, 90 yards, 3:44; Washington 25–13)

Fourth quarter

- (3:34) WASH – Jesse Callier 2-yard run, kick failed (Drive: 10 plays, 59 yards, 4:02; Washington 31–13)

Statistics	ARIZ	WASH
First downs	19	24
Total yards	318	409
Rushing yards	49–199	61–244
Passing yards	119	165
Passing: Comp–Att–Int	14–37–2	14–25–1
Time of possession	29:38	30:22

Team	Category	Player	Statistics
Arizona	Passing	B.J. Denker	14/35, 119 yards, 2 INT
Arizona	Rushing	Ka'Deem Carey	30 carries, 132 yards, TD
Arizona	Receiving	Ka'Deem Carey	4 receptions, 49 yards
Washington	Passing	Keith Price	14/25, 165 yards, 2 TD, INT
Washington	Rushing	Bishop Sankey	40 carries, 161 yards, TD
Washington	Receiving	Kevin Smith	4 receptions, 68 yards, TD

=== at USC ===
Arizona Wildcats (3–1) at USC Trojans (3–2) – Game summary

Quarter	1	2	3	4	Total
Wildcats	0	10	7	14	31
Trojans	14	14	3	7	38

at Los Angeles Memorial Coliseum • Los Angeles, CA

- Date: October 10, 2013
- Game time: 7:30 p.m.
- Game weather: Partly Hazy, 61 °F (16 °C)
- Game attendance: 64,215
- Referee: Land Clark
- TV: FS1

Game information

First quarter

- (12:21) USC – Nelson Agholor 62-yard pass from Cody Kessler, Andre Heidari kick (Drive: 1 play, 62 yards, 0:09; USC 7–0)
- (5:02) USC – Tre Madden 63-yard pass from Cody Kessler, Andre Heidari kick (Drive: 5 plays, 78 yards, 2:41; USC 14–0)

Second quarter

- (12:42) ARIZ – Jake Smith 27-yard field goal (Drive: 13 plays, 86 yards, 4:35; USC 14–3)
- (6:40) USC – Justin Davis 11-yard run, Andre Heidari kick (Drive: 5 plays, 42 yards, 2:07; USC 21–3)
- (2:08) USC – Javorius Allen 1-yard run, Andre Heidari kick (Drive: 7 plays, 58 yards, 2:41; USC 28–3)
- (0:56) ARIZ – Nate Phillips 57-yard pass from B.J. Denker, Jake Smith kick (Drive: 4 plays, 75 yards, 1:05; USC 28–10)

Third quarter

- (8:15) USC – Andre Heidari 45-yard field goal (Drive: 10 plays, 49 yards, 4:31; USC 31–10)
- (4:13) ARIZ – Garic Wharton 45-yard pass from B.J. Denker, Jake Smith kick (Drive: 3 plays, 85 yards, 0:52; USC 31–17)

Fourth quarter

- (14:46) USC – Javorius Allen 4-yard run, Andre Heidari kick (Drive: 9 plays, 73 yards, 4:13; USC 38–17)
- (6:48) ARIZ – David Richards 9-yard pass from B.J. Denker, Jake Smith kick (Drive: 17 plays, 96 yards, 4:53; USC 38–24)
- (4:18) ARIZ – Garic Wharton 28-yard pass from B.J. Denker, Jake Smith kick (Drive: 2 plays, 42 yards, 0:19; USC 38–31)

Statistics	ARIZ	USC
First downs	25	27
Total yards	508	546
Rushing yards	33–145	45–249
Passing yards	363	297
Passing: Comp–Att–Int	28–44–0	15–30–0
Time of possession	26:27	33:33

Team	Category	Player	Statistics
Arizona	Passing	B.J. Denker	28/44, 363 yards, 4 TD
Arizona	Rushing	Ka'Deem Carey	21 carries, 138 yards
Arizona	Receiving	Terrence Miller	6 receptions, 76 yards
USC	Passing	Cody Kessler	15/30, 297 yards, 2 TD
USC	Rushing	Silas Redd	19 carries, 80 yards
USC	Receiving	Nelson Agholor	7 receptions, 161 yards, TD

=== vs Utah ===
Utah Utes (4–2) vs Arizona Wildcats (3–2) – Game summary

Quarter	1	2	3	4	Total
Utes	7	0	14	3	24
Wildcats	7	13	0	15	35

at Arizona Stadium • Tucson, AZ

- Date: October 19, 2013
- Game time: 7:00 p.m.
- Game weather: Clear, 73 °F (23 °C)
- Game attendance: 50,871
- Referee: Terry Leyden
- TV: Pac-12 Network

Game information

First quarter

- (9:17) ARIZ – B.J. Denker 10-yard run, Jake Smith kick (Drive: 8 plays, 80 yards, 1:52; Arizona 7–0)
- (6:01) UTAH – Anthony Denham 2-yard pass from Travis Wilson, Andy Phillips kick (Drive: 8 plays, 71 yards, 3:12; Tied 7–7)

Second quarter

- (14:11) ARIZ – Marquis Flowers 14-yard interception return, Jake Smith kick (Arizona 14–7)
- (5:48) ARIZ – B.J. Denker 1-yard run, kick failed (Drive: 13 plays, 72 yards, 4:10; Arizona 20–7)

Third quarter

- (10:39) UTAH – Kelvin York 1-yard run, Andy Phillips kick (Drive: 3 plays, 17 yards, 0:57; Arizona 20–14)
- (9:08) UTAH – Sean Fitzgerald 55-yard pass from Adam Schulz, Andy Phillips kick (Drive: 1 play, 55 yards, 0:11; Utah 21–20)

Fourth quarter

- (13:32) ARIZ – Nate Phillips 7-yard pass from B.J. Denker, B.J. Denker run for two-point conversion (Drive: 7 plays, 63 yards, 1:55; Arizona 28–21)
- (7:11) UTAH – Andy Phillips 44-yard field goal (Drive: 10 plays, 30 yards, 3:52; Arizona 28–24)
- (1:30) ARIZ – Ka'Deem Carey 44-yard run, Jake Smith kick (Drive: 5 plays, 77 yards, 2:19; Arizona 35–24)

Statistics	UTAH	ARIZ
First downs	16	26
Total yards	329	468
Rushing yards	42–172	58–300
Passing yards	157	168
Passing: Comp–Att–Int	15–32–2	18–30–0
Time of possession	30:47	29:13

Team	Category	Player	Statistics
Utah	Passing	Adam Schulz	12/23, 142 yards, TD
Utah	Rushing	Lucky Radley	5 carries, 56 yards
Utah	Receiving	Sean Fitzgerald	3 receptions, 69 yards, TD
Arizona	Passing	B.J. Denker	18/30, 168 yards, TD
Arizona	Rushing	Ka'Deem Carey	39 carries, 232 yards, TD
Arizona	Receiving	Nate Phillips	4 receptions, 63 yards, TD

=== at Colorado ===
Arizona Wildcats (4–2) at Colorado Buffaloes (3–3) – Game summary

Quarter	1	2	3	4	Total
Wildcats	10	14	10	10	44
Buffaloes	7	6	7	0	20

at Folsom Field • Boulder, CO

- Date: October 26, 2013
- Game time: 5:00 p.m.
- Game weather: Clear, 59 °F (15 °C)
- Game attendance: 38,679
- Referee: Jay Stricherz
- TV: Pac-12 Network

Game information

First quarter

- (7:55) ARIZ – Ka'Deem Carey 1-yard run, Jake Smith kick (Drive: 14 plays, 88 yards, 4:04; Arizona 7–0)
- (7:42) COLO – Paul Richardson 75-yard pass from Sefo Liufau, Will Oliver kick (Drive: 1 play, 75 yards, 0:13; Tied 7–7)
- (4:34) ARIZ – Jake Smith 37-yard field goal (Drive: 12 plays, 57 yards, 2:59; Arizona 10–7)

Second quarter

- (14:50) COLO – Will Oliver 53-yard field goal (Drive: 7 plays, 19 yards, 2:30; Tied 10–10)
- (5:12) COLO – Will Oliver 48-yard field goal (Drive: 7 plays, 18 yards, 2:26; Colorado 13–10)
- (2:28) ARIZ – Ka'Deem Carey 7-yard run, Jake Smith kick (Drive: 9 plays, 75 yards, 2:44; Arizona 17–13)
- (0:50) ARIZ – Nate Phillips 44-yard pass from B.J. Denker, Jake Smith kick (Drive: 2 plays, 74 yards, 0:27; Arizona 24–13)

Third quarter

- (13:25) ARIZ – Jake Smith 26-yard field goal (Drive: 6 plays, 66 yards, 1:35; Arizona 27–13)
- (9:53) COLO – Michael Adkins II 1-yard run, Will Oliver kick (Drive: 9 plays, 75 yards, 3:32; Arizona 27–20)
- (7:55) ARIZ – Ka'Deem Carey 1-yard run, Jake Smith kick (Drive: 7 plays, 70 yards, 1:58; Arizona 34–20)

Fourth quarter

- (14:30) ARIZ – Ka'Deem Carey 6-yard run, Jake Smith kick (Drive: 2 plays, 18 yards, 0:24; Arizona 41–20)
- (9:10) ARIZ – Jake Smith 28-yard field goal (Drive: 6 plays, 64 yards, 3:05; Arizona 44–20)

Statistics	ARIZ	COLO
First downs	26	19
Total yards	670	349
Rushing yards	50–405	42–137
Passing yards	265	212
Passing: Comp–Att–Int	21–32–1	17–33–1
Time of possession	29:29	30:31

Team	Category	Player	Statistics
Arizona	Passing	B.J. Denker	21/32, 265 yards, TD, INT
Arizona	Rushing	B.J. Denker	23 carries, 192 yards
Arizona	Receiving	Nate Phillips	4 receptions, 69 yards, TD
Colorado	Passing	Sefo Liufau	17/32, 212 yards, TD, INT
Colorado	Rushing	Michael Adkins II	16 carries, 54 yards, TD
Colorado	Receiving	Paul Richardson	7 receptions, 132 yards, TD

=== at California ===
Arizona Wildcats (5–2) at California Golden Bears (1–7) – Game summary

Quarter	1	2	3	4	Total
Wildcats	9	10	14	0	33
Golden Bears	7	7	7	7	28

at Memorial Stadium • Berkeley, CA

- Date: November 2, 2013
- Game time: 12:30 p.m.
- Game weather: Mostly Clear, 67 °F (19 °C)
- Game attendance: 41,874
- Referee: Jack Wood
- TV: Pac-12 Network

Game information

First quarter

- (10:38) CAL – Khalfani Muhammad 11-yard pass from Jared Goff, Vincenzo D'Amato kick (Drive: 12 plays, 75 yards, 4:22; California 7–0)
- (8:19) ARIZ – B.J. Denker 9-yard run, Jake Smith kick (Drive: 9 plays, 73 yards, 2:12; Tied 7–7)
- (1:56) ARIZ – Team safety (Arizona 9–7)

Second quarter

- (12:54) ARIZ – Jake Smith 53-yard field goal (Drive: 7 plays, 19 yards, 2:22; Arizona 12–7)
- (8:22) ARIZ – Nate Phillips 21-yard pass from B.J. Denker, Jake Smith kick (Drive: 10 plays, 57 yards, 2:59; Arizona 19–7)
- (6:04) CAL – Kenny Lawler 17-yard pass from Jared Goff, Vincenzo D'Amato kick (Drive: 8 plays, 63 yards, 2:11; Arizona 19–14)

Third quarter

- (12:42) ARIZ – B.J. Denker 1-yard run, Jake Smith kick (Drive: 8 plays, 75 yards, 2:18; Arizona 26–14)
- (3:34) CAL – Kenny Lawler 3-yard pass from Jared Goff, Vincenzo D'Amato kick (Drive: 12 plays, 80 yards, 5:05; Arizona 26–21)
- (0:07) ARIZ – B.J. Denker 14-yard run, Jake Smith kick (Drive: 4 plays, 27 yards, 1:09; Arizona 33–21)

Fourth quarter

- (1:42) CAL – Kenny Lawler 29-yard pass from Jared Goff, Vincenzo D'Amato kick (Drive: 7 plays, 80 yards, 2:14; Arizona 33–28)

Statistics	ARIZ	CAL
First downs	26	24
Total yards	448	419
Rushing yards	51–187	26–130
Passing yards	261	289
Passing: Comp–Att–Int	24–38–0	34–56–2
Time of possession	32:57	27:03

Team	Category	Player	Statistics
Arizona	Passing	B.J. Denker	24/38, 261 yards, TD
Arizona	Rushing	Ka'Deem Carey	32 carries, 152 yards
Arizona	Receiving	Terrence Miller	5 receptions, 88 yards
California	Passing	Jared Goff	34/56, 289 yards, 4 TD, 2 INT
California	Rushing	Daniel Lasco	12 carries, 71 yards
California	Receiving	Kenny Lawler	6 receptions, 72 yards, 3 TD

=== vs No. 16 UCLA ===
No. 16 UCLA Bruins (6–2) vs Arizona Wildcats (6–2) – Game summary

Quarter	1	2	3	4	Total
#16 Bruins	14	7	3	7	31
Wildcats	3	7	3	13	26

at Arizona Stadium • Tucson, AZ

- Date: November 9, 2013
- Game time: 8:00 p.m.
- Game weather: Clear, 72 °F (22 °C)
- Game attendance: 51,531
- Referee: Jack Folliard
- TV: ESPN

Game information

First quarter

- (10:58) ARIZ – Jake Smith 44-yard field goal (Drive: 12 plays, 48 yards, 4:02; Arizona 3–0)
- (10:41) UCLA – Shaquelle Evans 66-yard pass from Brett Hundley, Ka'imi Fairbairn kick (Drive: 9 plays, 80 yards, 2:57; UCLA 7–3)
- (1:23) UCLA – Brett Hundley 15-yard run, Ka'imi Fairbairn kick (Drive: 12 plays, 84 yards, 6:00; UCLA 14–3)

Second quarter

- (12:55) ARIZ – Ka'Deem Carey 4-yard run, Jake Smith kick (Drive: 4 plays, 25 yards, 0:57; UCLA 14–10)
- (0:16) UCLA – Shaquelle Evans 4-yard pass from Brett Hundley, Ka'imi Fairbairn kick (Drive: 16 plays, 90 yards, 6:16; UCLA 21–10)

Third quarter

- (10:30) UCLA – Ka'imi Fairbairn 34-yard field goal (Drive: 11 plays, 59 yards, 4:30; UCLA 24–10)
- (2:15) ARIZ – Jake Smith 27-yard field goal (Drive: 5 plays, 18 yards, 2:00; UCLA 24–13)

Fourth quarter

- (11:46) ARIZ – Nate Phillips 15-yard pass from B.J. Denker, Jake Smith kick (Drive: 8 plays, 88 yards, 3:06; UCLA 24–20)
- (10:46) UCLA – Myles Jack 66-yard run, Ka'imi Fairbairn kick (Drive: 3 plays, 75 yards, 1:00; UCLA 31–20)
- (8:02) ARIZ – Nate Phillips 14-yard pass from B.J. Denker, Jake Smith kick (Drive: 9 plays, 75 yards, 2:44; UCLA 31–27)

Statistics	UCLA	ARIZ
First downs	22	24
Total yards	476	425
Rushing yards	49–249	47–239
Passing yards	227	186
Passing: Comp–Att–Int	18–26–0	20–33–1
Time of possession	33:12	26:48

Team	Category	Player	Statistics
UCLA	Passing	Brett Hundley	18/25, 227 yards, 2 TD
UCLA	Rushing	Myles Jack	6 carries, 120 yards, TD
UCLA	Receiving	Shaquelle Evans	4 receptions, 97 yards, 2 TD
Arizona	Passing	B.J. Denker	20/33, 186 yards, 2 TD, INT
Arizona	Rushing	Ka'Deem Carey	28 carries, 149 yards, TD
Arizona	Receiving	Nate Phillips	8 receptions, 97 yards, 2 TD

=== vs Washington State ===
Washington State Cougars (4–5) vs Arizona Wildcats (6–3) – Game summary

Quarter	1	2	3	4	Total
Cougars	10	0	7	7	24
Wildcats	7	7	3	0	17

at Arizona Stadium • Tucson, AZ

- Date: November 16, 2013
- Game time: 12:00 p.m.
- Game weather: Clear, 72 °F (22 °C)
- Game attendance: 42,080
- Referee: Jay Stricherz
- TV: Pac-12 Network

Game information

First quarter

- (7:10) WSU – Mason Marcus 15-yard run, Andrew Furney kick (Drive: 7 plays, 60 yards, 3:01; Washington State 7–0)
- (2:05) WSU – Andrew Furney 24-yard field goal (Drive: 10 plays, 64 yards, 3:48; Washington State 10–0)
- (0:47) ARIZ – Ka'Deem Carey 30-yard run, Jake Smith kick (Drive: 4 plays, 61 yards, 1:09; Washington State 10–7)

Second quarter

- (7:37) ARIZ – Ka'Deem Carey 7-yard pass from B.J. Denker, Jake Smith kick (Drive: 15 plays, 90 yards, 4:39; Arizona 14–10)

Third quarter

- (11:17) WSU – River Cracraft 23-yard pass from Connor Halliday, Andrew Furney kick (Drive: 6 plays, 31 yards, 2:52; Washington State 17–14)
- (6:36) ARIZ – Jake Smith 25-yard field goal (Drive: 13 plays, 57 yards, 4:41; Tied 17–17)

Fourth quarter

- (2:15) WSU – Isiah Myers 25-yard pass from Connor Halliday, Andrew Furney kick (Drive: 10 plays, 80 yards, 4:44; Washington State 24–17)

Statistics	WSU	ARIZ
First downs	27	24
Total yards	420	395
Rushing yards	27–101	45–195
Passing yards	319	200
Passing: Comp–Att–Int	39–53–1	26–38–0
Time of possession	34:08	25:52

Team	Category	Player	Statistics
Washington State	Passing	Connor Halliday	39/53, 319 yards, 2 TD, INT
Washington State	Rushing	Mason Marcus	11 carries, 63 yards, TD
Washington State	Receiving	Dominique Williams	7 receptions, 75 yards
Arizona	Passing	B.J. Denker	26/38, 200 yards, TD
Arizona	Rushing	Ka'Deem Carey	26 carries, 132 yards, TD
Arizona	Receiving	Ka'Deem Carey	6 receptions, 45 yards, TD

=== vs No. 5 Oregon ===
No. 5 Oregon Ducks (9–1) vs Arizona Wildcats (6–4) – Game summary

Quarter	1	2	3	4	Total
#5 Ducks	3	6	0	7	16
Wildcats	14	14	7	7	42

at Arizona Stadium • Tucson, AZ

- Date: November 23, 2013
- Game time: 12:30 p.m.
- Game weather: Overcast, Rainy, 50 °F (10 °C)
- Game attendance: 45,777
- Referee: Land Clark
- TV: ABC/ESPN2

Game information

First quarter

- (11:51) ARIZ – Ka'Deem Carey 6-yard run, Jake Smith kick (Drive: 9 plays, 45 yards, 2:49; Arizona 7–0)
- (7:09) ARIZ – Nate Phillips 9-yard pass from B.J. Denker, Jake Smith kick (Drive: 10 plays, 59 yards, 3:52; Arizona 14–0)
- (2:49) ORE – Matt Wogan 33-yard field goal (Drive: 10 plays, 59 yards, 3:52; Arizona 14–3)

Second quarter

- (11:32) ARIZ – Terrence Miller 5-yard pass from B.J. Denker, Jake Smith kick (Drive: 16 plays, 83 yards, 6:12; Arizona 21–3)
- (7:39) ORE – Pharoah Brown 1-yard pass from Marcus Mariota, two-point run failed (Drive: 11 plays, 67 yards, 3:46; Arizona 21–9)
- (0:18) ARIZ – Ka'Deem Carey 1-yard run, Jake Smith kick (Drive: 6 plays, 59 yards, 0:42; Arizona 28–9)

Third quarter

- (2:07) ARIZ – Ka'Deem Carey 9-yard run, Jake Smith kick (Drive: 9 plays, 70 yards, 3:36; Arizona 35–9)

Fourth quarter

- (14:11) ORE – Josh Huff 2-yard pass from Marcus Mariota, Matt Wogan kick (Drive: 11 plays, 84 yards, 2:56; Arizona 35–16)
- (8:59) ARIZ – Ka'Deem Carey 1-yard run, Jake Smith kick (Drive: 12 plays, 75 yards, 5:12; Arizona 42–16)

Statistics	ORE	ARIZ
First downs	27	29
Total yards	506	482
Rushing yards	39–198	65–304
Passing yards	308	178
Passing: Comp–Att–Int	27–41–2	19–22–0
Time of possession	24:31	35:29

Team	Category	Player	Statistics
Oregon	Passing	Marcus Mariota	27/41, 308 yards, 2 TD, 2 INT
Oregon	Rushing	De'Anthony Thomas	16 carries, 95 yards
Oregon	Receiving	De'Anthony Thomas	6 receptions, 74 yards
Arizona	Passing	B.J. Denker	19/22, 178 yards, 2 TD
Arizona	Rushing	Ka'Deem Carey	48 carries, 206 yards, 4 TD
Arizona	Receiving	Terrence Miller	9 receptions, 88 yards, TD

Ka'Deem Carey ran for 206 yards and four touchdowns, becoming Arizona's all-time leading rusher, and the Wildcats pulled off a monumental upset by taking advantage of numerous miscues, shocking the fifth-ranked Oregon Ducks 42–16 in Tucson.

The Wildcats achieved their first win over a top-five team since knocking off #2 Oregon in 2007.

Carey carried a school-record 48 times while scoring on runs of 6, 1, 9 and 2 yards to break Art Luppino's career record of 48 total touchdowns set from 1953 to 1956. Carey also reached 3,913 career yards rushing, breaking the mark of 3,824 set by Trung Canidate from 1996 to 1999.

=== at Arizona State ===
Arizona Wildcats (7–4) at Arizona State Sun Devils (9–2) – Game summary

Quarter	1	2	3	4	Total
Wildcats	0	7	14	0	21
Sun Devils	13	17	14	14	58

at Sun Devil Stadium • Tempe, Arizona

- Date: November 30, 2013
- Game time: 7:30 p.m.
- Game weather: High clouds, 64 °F (18 °C)
- Game attendance: 72,542
- Referee: Jack Wood
- TV: Pac-12 Network

Game information

First quarter

- (10:23) ASU – Zane Gonzalez 38-yard field goal (Drive: 13 plays, 54 yards, 4:37; Arizona State 3–0)
- (7:06) ASU – Zane Gonzalez 21-yard field goal (Drive: 6 plays, 20 yards, 2:07; Arizona State 6–0)
- (2:38) ASU – Darwin Rogers 38-yard pass from Taylor Kelly, Zane Gonzalez kick (Drive: 7 plays, 80 yards, 2:16; Arizona State 13–0)

Second quarter

- (12:58) ASU – D.J. Foster 14-yard run, Zane Gonzalez kick (Drive: 4 plays, 53 yards, 1:18; Arizona State 20–0)
- (8:04) ASU – De'Marieya Nelson 1-yard run, Zane Gonzalez kick (Drive: 5 plays, 31 yards, 1:55; Arizona State 27–0)
- (4:14) ARIZ – B.J. Denker 1-yard run, Jake Smith kick (Drive: 12 plays, 78 yards, 3:44; Arizona State 27–7)
- (0:11) ASU – Zane Gonzalez 23-yard field goal (Drive: 6 plays, 69 yards, 1:12; Arizona State 30–7)

Third quarter

- (12:17) ARIZ – Ka'Deem Carey 8-yard run, Jake Smith kick (Drive: 7 plays, 75 yards, 2:43; Arizona State 30–14)
- (7:24) ASU – Damarious Randall 64-yard interception return, Zane Gonzalez kick (Arizona State 37–14)
- (2:27) ARIZ – Garic Wharton 4-yard run, Jake Smith kick (Drive: 5 plays, 68 yards, 1:42; Arizona State 37–21)
- (1:17) ASU – Jaelen Strong 38-yard pass from Taylor Kelly, Zane Gonzalez kick (Drive: 4 plays, 75 yards, 1:18; Arizona State 44–21)

Fourth quarter

- (13:17) ASU – D.J. Foster 7-yard run, Zane Gonzalez kick (Drive: 6 plays, 31 yards, 2:52; Arizona State 51–21)
- (5:57) ASU – De'Marieya Nelson 1-yard run, Zane Gonzalez kick (Drive: 7 plays, 29 yards, 3:58; Arizona State 58–21)

Statistics	ARIZ	ASU
First downs	20	22
Total yards	424	478
Rushing yards	49–249	52–204
Passing yards	175	274
Passing: Comp–Att–Int	15–30–3	13–25–1
Time of possession	27:41	32:19

Team	Category	Player	Statistics
Arizona	Passing	B.J. Denker	15/30, 175 yards, 3 INT
Arizona	Rushing	Ka'Deem Carey	32 carries, 157 yards, TD
Arizona	Receiving	Garic Wharton	4 receptions, 76 yards
Arizona State	Passing	Taylor Kelly	13/25, 274 yards, 2 TD, INT
Arizona State	Rushing	D.J. Foster	23 carries, 124 yards, 2 TD
Arizona State	Receiving	Jaelen Strong	4 receptions, 142 yards, TD

=== vs Boston College (AdvoCare V100 Bowl) ===
Arizona Wildcats (7–5) vs Boston College Eagles (7–5) – Game summary
(2013 AdvoCare V100 Bowl)

Quarter	1	2	3	4	Total
Wildcats	7	14	14	7	42
Eagles	3	3	0	13	19

at Independence Stadium • Shreveport, Louisiana

- Date: December 31, 2013
- Game time: 7:30 p.m.
- Game weather: Partly cloudy, 36 °F (2 °C)
- Game attendance: 36,917
- Referee: Alan Eck
- TV: ESPN

Game information

First quarter

- (7:51) ARIZ – Ka'Deem Carey 2-yard run, Jake Smith kick (Drive: 4 plays, 92 yards, 0:41; Arizona 7–0)
- (1:11) BC – Nate Freese 32-yard field goal (Drive: 14 plays, 54 yards, 6:40; Arizona 7–3)

Second quarter

- (8:45) BC – Nate Freese 41-yard field goal (Drive: 11 plays, 46 yards, 5:02; Arizona 7–6)
- (4:16) ARIZ – Will Parks 69-yard inteception return, Jake Smith kick (Arizona 14–6)
- (0:30) ARIZ – Trey Griffey 26-yard pass from B.J. Denker, Jake Smith kick (Drive: 10 plays, 80 yards, 2:13; Arizona 21–6)

Third quarter

- (12:11) ARIZ – Ka'Deem Carey 5-yard run, Jake Smith kick (Drive: 11 plays, 75 yards, 2:49; Arizona 28–6)
- (4:56) ARIZ – B.J. Denker 14-yard run, Jake Smith kick (Drive: 8 plays, 93 yards, 2:16; Arizona 35–6)

Fourth quarter

- (13:40) ARIZ – Trey Griffey 3-yard pass from B.J. Denker, Jake Smith kick (Drive: 12 plays, 80 yards, 4:41; Arizona 42–6)
- (12:00) BC – Andre Williams 4-yard run, two-point run failed (Drive: 4 plays, 65 yards, 1:40; Arizona 42–12)
- (0:35) BC – Tyler Rouse 6-yard run, Nate Freese kick (Drive: 12 plays, 94 yards, 4:35; Arizona 42–19)

Statistics	ARIZ	BC
First downs	28	20
Total yards	529	351
Rushing yards	49–254	45–145
Passing yards	275	206
Passing: Comp–Att–Int	17–24–0	17–28–2
Time of possession	24:50	35:10

Team	Category	Player	Statistics
Arizona	Passing	B.J. Denker	17/24, 275 yards, 2 TD
Arizona	Rushing	Ka'Deem Carey	27 carries, 169 yards, 2 TD
Arizona	Receiving	Nate Phillips	9 receptions, 193 yards
Boston College	Passing	Chase Rettig	16/26, 191 yards, 2 INT
Boston College	Rushing	Andre Williams	26 carries, 75 yards, TD
Boston College	Receiving	Alex Amidon	10 receptions, 129 yards

Quarterback B.J. Denker was named Offensive MVP.

Safety Will Parks was named Defensive MVP.

== Statistics ==
=== Scores by quarter (non-conference opponents) ===
	1	2	3	4	Total
Arizona	52	59	38	31	180
All non-conference opponents	9	21	0	27	57

=== Scores by quarter (Pac-12 opponents) ===
	1	2	3	4	Total
Arizona	50	88	68	59	265
Pac-12 opponents	83	60	69	58	270

== After the season ==
=== Notes ===
- January 13, 2014, Ka'Deem Carey will declare going to the 2014 NFL draft.

=== Awards ===
Tra’Mayne Bondurant

- Pac-12 Defensive Player of the Week (September 2, 2013)

Ka'Deem Carey

- Consensus NCAA All-American (AFCA, FWAA, WCFF, AP)
- USA Today First-Team All-American
- CBSSports.com First-Team All-American
- ESPN.com All-America Team
- Sports Illustrated All-America Team
- Athlon All-America Team
- Pac-12 Offensive Player of the Year
- Pac-12 First-Team All-Conference (unanimous)
- Pac-12 Offensive Player of the Week (October 21, 2013; November 25, 2013)

B.J. Denker

- Pac-12 Offensive Player of the Week (October 28, 2013)

Jake Smith

- Pac-12 Special Teams Player of the Week (September 9, 2013)

Nate Phillips

- FWAA Freshman All American (January 6, 2014)

=== Team records broken ===
Team total offense

Rushing yards – career

	YR	NAME	POS	ATT	YDS	AVG	TD
New	2013	Ka'Deem Carey	RB	743	4,239	18.4	48
Old	1999	Trung Canidate	RB	604	3,824	6.3	25

=== Players drafted ===
The following Arizona players were selected in the 2014 NFL draft.

Player	Position	Round	Pick	Team
Ka'Deem Carey	RB	4	117	Chicago Bears
Shaquille Richardson	CB	5	157	Pittsburgh Steelers
Marquis Flowers	LB	6	212	Cincinnati Bengals

== Rankings ==
Ranking movements Legend: ██ Increase in ranking ██ Decrease in ranking — = Not ranked RV = Received votes
	Week																
Poll	Pre	1	2	3	4	5	6	7	8	9	10	11	12	13	14	15	Final
AP	RV	RV	RV	RV	RV	—	—	—	—	RV	—	—	—	—	—	—	RV
Coaches	RV	RV	RV	RV	RV	RV	RV	—	—	—	—	RV	—	—	—	—	RV
Harris	Not released							—	—	RV	RV	—	—	—	—	—	Not released
BCS	Not released								—	—	—	—	—	—	—	—	Not released

== Media affiliates ==
=== Radio ===
- ESPN Radio – (ESPN Tucson 1490 AM & 104.09 FM) – Nationwide (Dish Network, Sirius XM, TuneIn radio and iHeartRadio)
- KCUB 1290 AM – Football Radio Show – (Tucson, AZ)
- KHYT – 107.5 FM (Tucson, AZ)
- KTKT 990 AM – La Hora de Los Gatos (Spanish) – (Tucson, AZ)
- KGME 910 AM – (IMG Sports Network) – (Phoenix, AZ)
- KTAN 1420 AM – (Sierra Vista, AZ)
- KDAP 96.5 FM (Douglas, Arizona)
- KWRQ 102.3 FM – (Safford, AZ/Thatcher, AZ)
- KIKO 1340 AM – (Globe, AZ)
- KVWM 970 AM – (Show Low, AZ/Pinetop-Lakeside, AZ)
- XENY 760 – (Nogales, Sonora) (Spanish)

=== TV ===
- KOLD (CBS)
- KGUN (ESPN College Football on ABC/ABC)
- FOX (Fox Sports Media Group)
- FS1 (Fox Sports Media Group)
- ESPN (ESPN Family)
- ESPN2 (ESPN Family)
- ESPNU (ESPN Family)
- CBS Sports Network
- Pac-12 Network (Pac-12 Arizona)
