= 2013 AdvoCare V100 Bowl =

- 38th Independence Bowl
Arizona Wildcats	Boston College Eagles
(7–5)	(7–5)
Pac-12	ACC
42	19
Head coach: Rich Rodriguez	Head coach: Steve Addazio
	1	2	3	4	Total
Arizona	7	14	14	7	42
Boston College	3	3	0	13	19
- Date: December 31, 2013
- Season: 2013
- Stadium: Independence Stadium
- Location: Shreveport, Louisiana
- MVP: B.J. Denker, Will Parks
- Favorite: Arizona by 7
- National anthem: Cole Vosbury
- Referee: Alan Eck (Mtn. West)
- Halftime show: Both Teams Marching Bands
- Attendance: 36,917
- Payout: US$1,100,000

United States TV coverage
- Network: ESPN
- Announcers: Tom Hart (Play-by-play); John Congemi (Analyst); Niki Noto (Sideline)

The 2013 AdvoCare V100 Bowl was an American college football bowl game that was played on December 31, 2013, at Independence Stadium in Shreveport, Louisiana. The 38th edition of the game otherwise known as the Independence Bowl, it matched up the Boston College Eagles from the Atlantic Coast Conference and the Arizona Wildcats from the Pac-12 Conference. The game kicked off at 11:30 a.m. CST and aired on ESPN. It was one of the 2013–14 bowl games that concluded the 2013 FBS football season. Arizona defeated Boston College by a score of 42–19. This was the final edition with nutritional supplement company AdvoCare as the title sponsor, and the only edition not to include "Independence Bowl" in the official name.

== Teams ==
Boston College finished the regular season with a record of 7–5 (4–4 ACC). Arizona's record was 7–5 (4–5 Pac-12).

The game featured the nation's top two running backs in BC's Andre Williams who was the 2013 Doak Walker Award winner and a Heisman Trophy finalist and in Arizona's Ka'Deem Carey who was also a finalist for the Doak Walker Award. Williams and Carey were FBS ranked first and second respectively in yards per game and both were consensus 2013 All-Americans, with Williams being a unanimous choice.

== Game summary ==
=== Scoring summary ===
Scoring summary

Quarter	Time	Drive			Team	Scoring information	Score	
Quarter	Time	Plays	Yards	TOP	Team	Scoring information	Arizona	Boston College
1	7:51	4	92	0:41	Arizona	Ka'Deem Carey 2-yard touchdown run, Jake Smith kick good	7	0
1	1:11	13	54	6:40	BC	32-yard field goal by Nate Freese	7	3
2	8:45	10	46	5:02	BC	41-yard field goal by Freese	7	6
2	4:16	0	1	0:28	Arizona	Interception returned 69 yards for touchdown by Will Parks, Smith kick good	14	6
2	0:30	10	80	2:13	Arizona	Trey Griffey 26-yard touchdown reception from B. J. Denker, Smith kick good	21	6
3	12:11	11	75	2:49	Arizona	Carey 5-yard touchdown run, Smith kick good	28	6
3	4:56	8	93	2:16	Arizona	Denker 14-yard touchdown run, Smith kick good	35	6
4	13:40	12	80	4:41	Arizona	Griffey 3-yard touchdown reception from Denker, Smith kick good	42	6
4	12:00	4	65	1:40	BC	Andre Williams 4-yard touchdown run, 2-point run failed	42	12
4	0:35	12	94	4:35	BC	Tyler Rouse 6-yard touchdown run, Freese kick good	42	19
"TOP" = time of possession. For other American football terms, see Glossary of American football.							42	19

=== Statistics ===
Statistics	ARZ	BC
First downs	28	20
Total offense, plays – yards	73–529	73–351
Rushes-yards (net)	49-254 (5.2)	45-145 (3.2)
Passing yards (net)	275 (11.5)	206 (7.4)
Passes, Comp-Att-Int	17-24-0	17–28–2
Fumbles lost	2	0
Penalties (Yds)	2-23	5-55
Time of Possession	24:50	35:10
3rd Down	7-12	8–17
4th Down	1-2	0-0

== Game notes ==
- November 27, 2013 – It was announced that B-25 to fly over Independence Stadium prior to kickoff of 2013 AdvoCare V100 Bowl
