= Andre Williams =

Andre Williams may refer to:

- Andre Williams (musician) (1936–2019)
- Andre Williams (American football) (born 1992)
- Andre Williams, British DJ better known as Shy FX
