= Aaron Lynch (American football) =

American gridiron football player (born 1993)

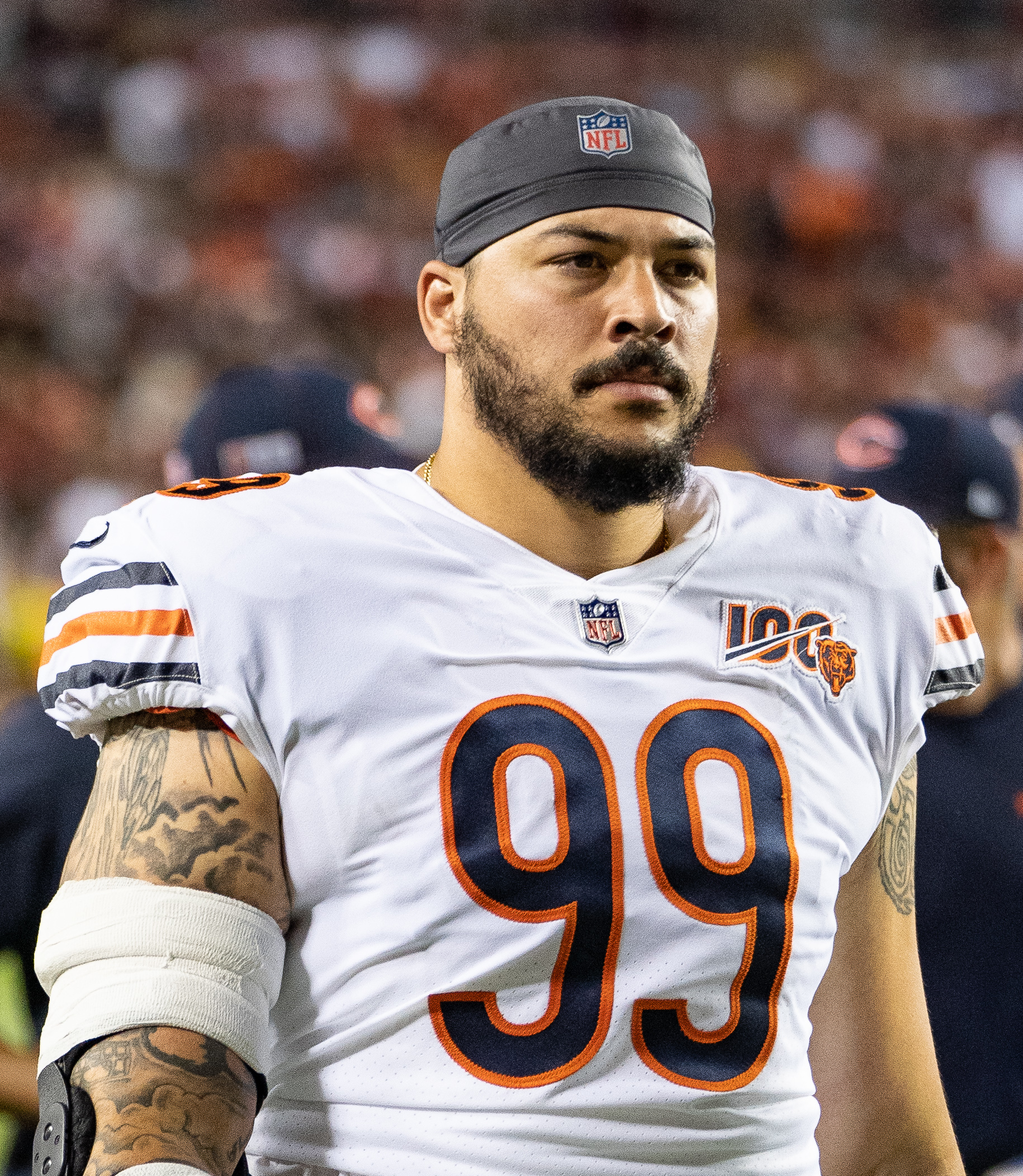
- Lynch with the Chicago Bears in 2019

Profile
- Position: Defensive end

Personal information
- Born: February 8, 1993 (age 33); Cape Coral, Florida, U.S.
- Listed height: 6 ft 5 in (1.96 m)
- Listed weight: 285 lb (129 kg)

Career information
- High school: Island Coast (Cape Coral, Florida)
- College: Notre Dame (2011); South Florida (2012–2013)
- NFL draft: 2014: 5th round, 150th overall pick

Career history
- San Francisco 49ers (2014–2017); Chicago Bears (2018–2019); Jacksonville Jaguars (2020); Montreal Alouettes (2024)*
- * Offseason or practice squad member only

Awards and highlights
- First-team All-AAC (2013)

Career NFL statistics
- Total tackles: 111
- Sacks: 21.0
- Fumble recoveries: 1
- Interceptions: 1
- Pass deflections: 11
- Stats at Pro Football Reference

Aaron Lynch (born February 8, 1993) is an American professional football defensive end. He was selected by the San Francisco 49ers in the fifth round of the 2014 NFL draft. He played college football at South Florida and Notre Dame.

== Early life ==
Lynch attended Island Coast High School in Cape Coral, Florida. He led the team to 11–2 record and Florida 2B state semifinal playoff appearance as senior in 2010. He also recorded 31 solo tackles and 10.5 sacks during senior campaign. He played in the U.S Army All-American Bowl in San Antonio, Texas in 2011.

Considered a four-star recruit by Rivals.com, Lynch was listed as the No. 3 defensive end in the nation. After de-committing from Florida State, he re-committed to Notre Dame over offers from Florida and Miami.

== College career ==
In 2011, Lynch enrolled a semester early at Notre Dame and was able to participate in spring practice. He worked his way onto the second-team and dominated in the annual Blue-Gold game. In his freshman season, he played in 12 games, starting in 6 of them. He recorded 33 tackles including 7 tackles for loss, a team high 5.5 sacks, and a team high of 14 quarterback hurries. He was awarded a 1st team selection on The 11th annual Football Writers Association of America Freshman All-America Team.

In April 2012, Lynch decided to transfer from Notre Dame, citing a desire to return closer to his home. After pondering his options, he announced his transfer to USF. He applied for a waiver to play immediately but the NCAA denied his request, forcing him to sit out the 2012 season.

As a junior, Lynch led the Bulls with six sacks and 12.5 tackles for loss, playing in all 12 games. He finished with 30 total tackles and added a fumble recovery returned for a touchdown in a 13–10 win over the Connecticut Huskies. Lynch had a strong finish to the season despite the Bulls' 3–9 record, totaling all six sacks in the last seven games.

Lynch announced in December 2013 that he would declare for the 2014 NFL draft.

== Professional career ==
Pre-draft measurables
Height	Weight	Arm length	Hand span	40-yard dash	10-yard split	20-yard split	20-yard shuttle	Three-cone drill	Vertical jump	Broad jump	Bench press
6 ft 5 in (1.96 m)	249 lb (113 kg)	34 in (0.86 m)	10 1/4 in (0.26 m)	4.69 s	1.52 s	2.63 s	4.61 s	7.46 s	29.0 in (0.74 m)	9 ft 9 in (2.97 m)	18 reps
All values from NFL Combine & Pro Day

=== San Francisco 49ers ===
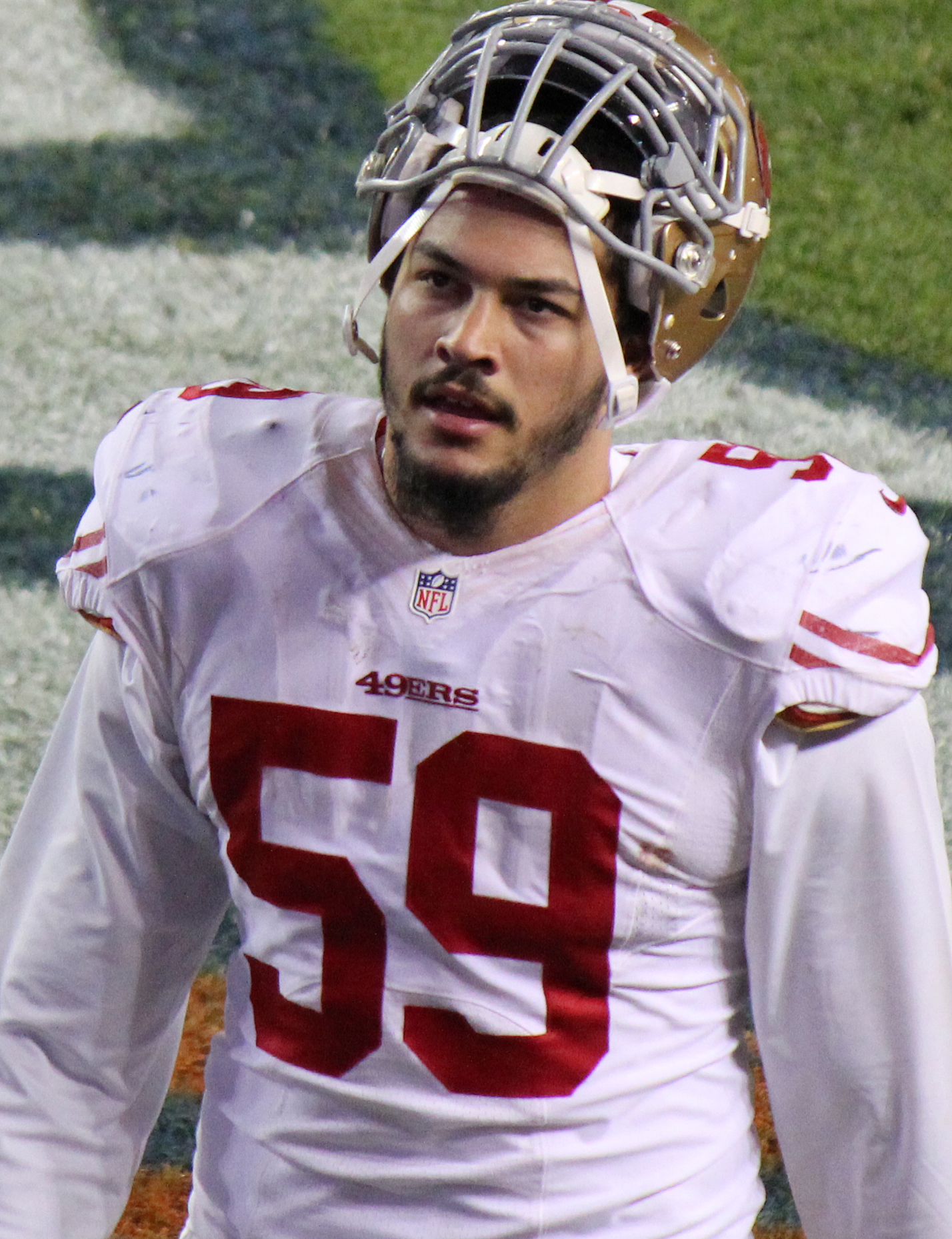
Lynch with the San Francisco 49ers in 2014

Lynch was selected by the San Francisco 49ers in the fifth round with the 150th overall pick of the 2014 NFL draft.

Lynch was given an opportunity and assisted on four tackles and made two solo tackles on November 9 against the New Orleans Saints. His six tackles in addition to his pass defended helped the 49ers excel in an overtime battle to defeat the Saints and remain in the playoff picture. Lynch finished his rookie season recording 23 tackles, six sacks, and four passes defensed with three starts in 16 appearances. In the 2015 season, he appeared in 14 games and started all but one of them. He had 6.5 sacks, 38 total tackles, and three passes defensed. He was suspended for the first four games of the 2016 season for a violation of the NFL's substance abuse policy. He appeared in seven games and started three in the 2016 season. He recorded 1.5 sacks and 13 total tackles. In the 2017 season, Lynch did not appear in the season opener with back injury. He played in the next five games before suffering a calf injury against the Washington Redskins in Week 6, which sidelined him until Week 14. He had one sack, nine total tackles, and one fumble recovery.

=== Chicago Bears ===
On March 15, 2018, Lynch signed a one-year contract with the Chicago Bears. He played in 13 games with three starts, recording 16 tackles, three sacks, and an interception.

On April 1, 2019, Lynch re-signed with the Bears. In Week 1 against the Green Bay Packers, Lynch recorded one tackle and sacked Aaron Rodgers once as the Bears lost 10–3.

=== Jacksonville Jaguars ===
On May 5, 2020, Lynch signed a one-year contract with the Jacksonville Jaguars. He retired from football on August 18, citing personal reasons. After two months of retirement, on October 21, Lynch was reinstated back to the Jaguars' active roster.

In Week 12 against the Cleveland Browns, Lynch recorded his first sack as a Jaguar on Baker Mayfield during the 27–25 loss.

On March 18, 2024, after three years of inactivity, Lynch had a workout with the Cleveland Browns.

On May 10, 2024, Lynch was listed on the roster for the 2024 Miami Dolphins rookie minicamp roster.

=== Montreal Alouettes ===
On May 20, 2024, it was announced that Lynch had signed with the Montreal Alouettes. He was released on June 2.

== NFL career statistics ==
Legend
**Bold**	Career high

Year	Team	Games		Tackles					Interceptions					Fumbles			
Year	Team	GP	GS	Cmb	Solo	Ast	Sck	TFL	Int	Yds	TD	Lng	PD	FF	FR	Yds	TD
2014	SFO	**16**	3	23	17	6	6.0	9	0	0	0	0	**4**	0	0	0	0
2015	SFO	14	**13**	**38**	**30**	**8**	**6.5**	**13**	0	0	0	0	3	0	0	0	0
2016	SFO	7	3	13	12	1	1.5	5	0	0	0	0	0	0	0	0	0
2017	SFO	7	0	9	5	4	1.0	2	0	0	0	0	0	0	**1**	0	0
2018	CHI	13	3	16	13	3	3.0	4	**1**	**20**	0	**20**	1	0	0	0	0
2019	CHI	**16**	0	6	4	2	2.0	3	0	0	0	0	2	0	0	0	0
2020	JAX	8	0	6	5	1	1.0	1	0	0	0	0	1	0	0	0	0
Career		81	22	111	86	25	21.0	37	1	20	0	20	11	0	1	0	0
