= Andre Williams (American football) =

American football player (born 1992)

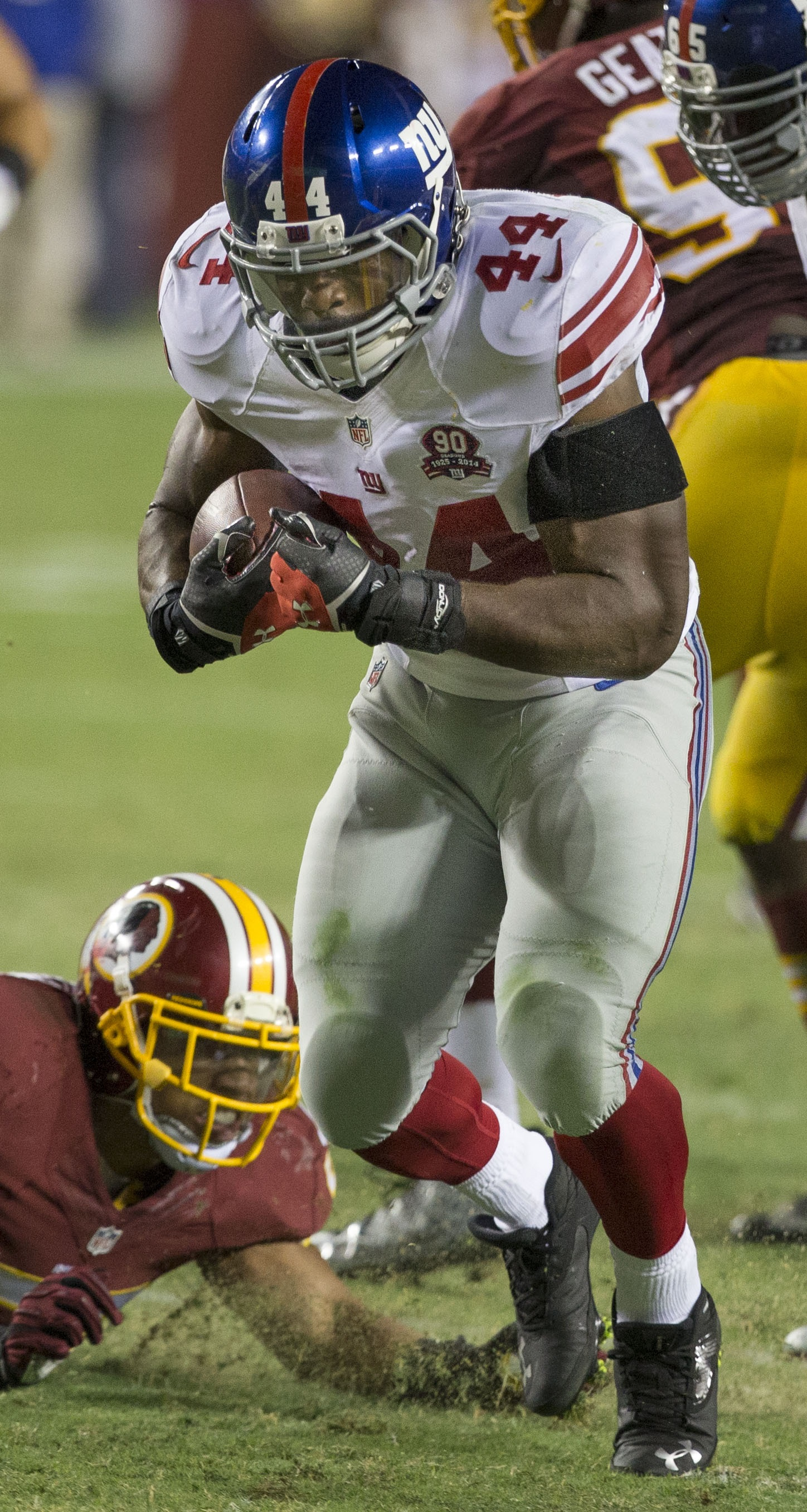
- Williams with the New York Giants in 2014

No. 44
- Position: Running back

Personal information
- Born: August 28, 1992 (age 34); Poughkeepsie, New York, U.S.
- Listed height: 6 ft 0 in (1.83 m)
- Listed weight: 220 lb (100 kg)

Career information
- High school: Parkland (South Whitehall Township, Pennsylvania)
- College: Boston College (2010–2013)
- NFL draft: 2014: 4th round, 113th overall pick

Career history
- New York Giants (2014–2015); San Diego / Los Angeles Chargers (2016–2017); Houston Roughnecks (2020)

Awards and highlights
- Doak Walker Award (2013); Jim Brown Award (2013); Unanimous All-American (2013); First-team All-ACC (2013)

Career NFL statistics
- Rushing attempts: 332
- Rushing yards: 1,090
- Rushing average: 3.3
- Rushing touchdowns: 8
- Receiving yards: 137
- Stats at Pro Football Reference

Andre Rishard Williams (born August 28, 1992) is an American former professional football player who was a running back in the National Football League (NFL). He played college football for the Boston College Eagles. He was a finalist for the 2013 Heisman Trophy, and won the 2013 Doak Walker Award as the nation's best running back. During the 2013 season, Williams became only the 16th player in NCAA history to rush for over 2,000 yards and he finished his college career ranked fifth all-time for most yards rushed in a single season with 2,177 yards. He was selected by the New York Giants in the fourth round of the 2014 NFL draft.

== Early life ==
Williams was born on August 28, 1992, in Poughkeepsie, New York, to Jamaican immigrants Lancelene and Ervin. Williams spent his first year in Jamaica before returning to live in Central Jersey with his parents, sister, and two brothers. His family also lived in Atlanta and Allentown, Pennsylvania. "By the eighth grade," Williams later explained, "I decided I was going to play Division I football."

After transferring from Harrison High School in Kennesaw, Georgia, Williams attended Parkland High School in South Whitehall Township, Pennsylvania. As a senior, he had 1,913 rushing yards on 128 carries and 33 touchdowns for the football team. He earned All-State Class AAAA first-team honors as a senior running back and was selected as The Morning Call Player of the Year. He led Parkland High School to a 10–3 record in 2009.

In addition to football, he was also a standout athlete for Parkland High School's track and field team. At the 2010 Pennsylvania 3A state championship, he finished third in the state in the 100 meters with a time of 10.76 seconds and second in the state in the 200 meters with a time of 22.01 seconds. He was also timed at 14.61 seconds in the 110 meter hurdles in 2009.

In 2010, Williams was ranked a three-star recruit by Rivals.com and was rated the 44th best running back prospect in the nation. He committed to Boston College over offers from Temple, Akron, and Vanderbilt.

== College career ==
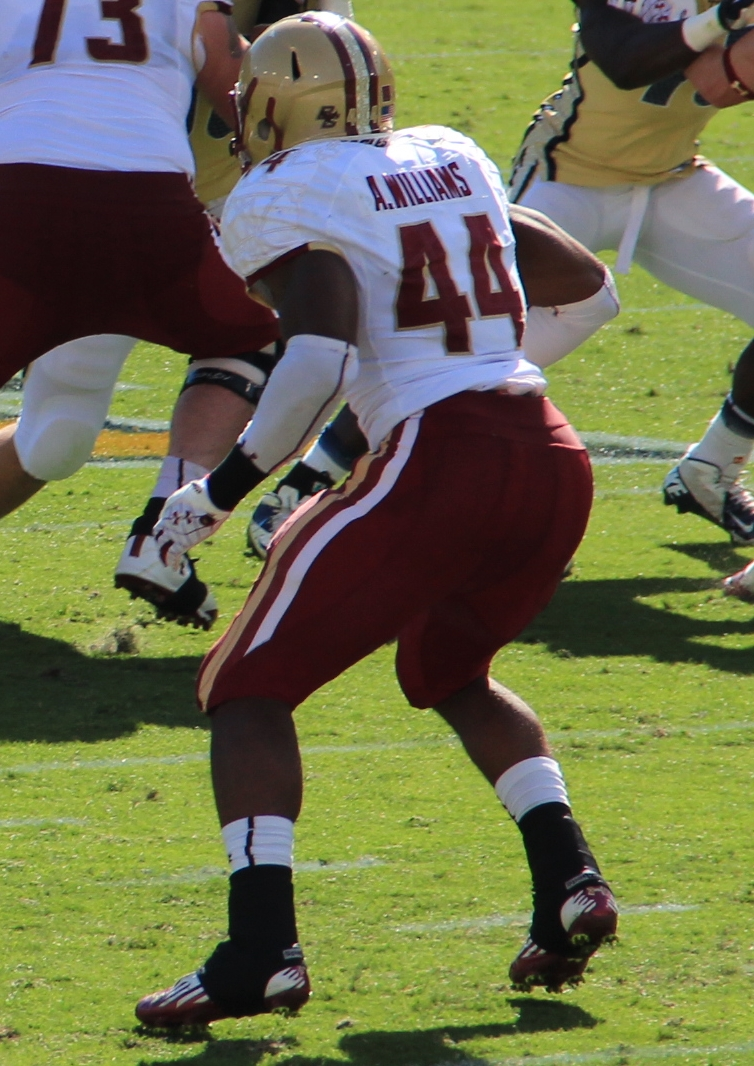
Williams playing for Boston College in October 2012

Williams attended Boston College, where he played for its Eagles football team from 2010 to 2013. He graduated early with a degree in applied psychology and human development.

=== Freshman season ===
Williams's first three years at Boston College were relatively uneventful. Playing as a true freshman in 2010, Williams showed his potential while sharing the backfield with Montel Harris and Sterlin Phifer. He played in all 13 games, rushing for 461 yards on 95 carries with two touchdowns. In the final regular season game of the year, playing at Syracuse, he set the school record for rushing attempts in a game, running 42 times as the Eagles beat the Orange 16–7.

=== Sophomore season ===
As a sophomore in 2011, Williams continued to improve, but played less time with sharing the backfield with Rolandon Finch, Tahj Kimble, and Montel Harris, starting seven of 10 games and rushing for 517 yards on 124 carries with four touchdowns.

=== Junior season ===
As a junior in 2012, he continued to be a reliable option, although for a pass-heavy offense, starting eight of nine games, rushing for 584 yards on 130 carries and four touchdowns. His efforts were mostly in vain though, as the Eagles continued to progressively get worse, winning 7 games in 2010, 4 in 2011, and only 2 in 2012. His three years of experience, however would pave the way for his breakout senior year and a turnaround for the Eagles team.

=== Senior season ===
With a change in coaching during the offseason, Steve Addazio brought in new coordinators and a new style of offense focused heavily on the run. Williams started off the year as a powerful weapon, running for 114 and 204 yards respectively in wins over Villanova and Wake Forest, and scoring once in each game. He had his worst performance of the season against a strong USC defense, managing only 38 yards. However, he bounced back against #8 ranked Florida State and ran for 149 yards as the Eagles nearly upset the eventual National Champions.

The following week, during the Homecoming game against Army, Williams exploded offensively, scoring five touchdowns and rushing for 263 yards, only 1 yard shy of the school's single game rushing record. He momentarily tied the record, but unfortunately lost a yard on his last rushing attempt of the game, bringing his total back down. After rushing for only 70 yards at Clemson, he gave two solid performances against UNC and Virginia Tech, rushing for 172 and 166 yards, respectively, and scoring three times. The next week at New Mexico State, Williams managed to break the single game record that he came so close to during the Army game, running for 295 yards and two scores.

The following week, playing on senior day, Boston College's final home game of the season against NC State, Williams broke his own record and ran for 339 yards on 42 carries, scoring twice. The performance also surpassed the Atlantic Coast Conference (ACC) record, previously set at 329 yards by John Leach of Wake Forest in 1993. During the game, he also broke the school's single season record for rushing yards, finishing the day with 1,810 yards. The win made BC bowl eligible for the first time since 2010, and tripled the previous year's win total, prompting the students and fans to rush the field and celebrate with the team following the win. Williams's performance was recognized by media across the country, as he was named the Walter Camp National Player of the Week, as well as ACC offensive back of the week. His successes and statistics as the league's leading rusher made him the front-runner for the Doak Walker Award as the nation's best running back.

After the success against North Carolina State at home, the Eagles took on Maryland for the first of their final two road games of the season. Williams had another big day, running for 263 yards and two scores, passing 2,000 yards and becoming only the 16th player in NCAA history to accomplish this feat. With this achievement, Williams became a part of the Heisman Trophy conversation.

The final game of the regular season was at 5–6 Syracuse. Unfortunately, Williams re-aggravated a right shoulder injury that he had been dealing with since the UNC game. He left the game early in the 3rd quarter and did not return, having rushed for only 29 yards for the day. Despite the disappointing end to the game, those 29 yards put Williams over 2,100 yards for the season and placed him at 9th all time in the FBS single-season rushing list.

The Eagles final game of the season was in the 2013 Independence Bowl against the Arizona Wildcats. The game featured a matchup between the nation's two best running backs in Williams and Arizona's Ka'Deem Carey, who was a consensus All-American in 2012 as well as a finalist for the 2013 Doak Walker award, which Williams won. The game was a blowout win for Arizona, as they cruised to a 42–19 victory. Williams ran for 75 yards in his final contest as a college back, finishing with 2,177 yards on the season, 5th most all-time in the NCAA.

==== Postseason awards ====
Williams was one of six finalists for the Heisman Trophy in 2013, and finished fourth in the voting. He was the winner of the 2013 Doak Walker Award and was named a unanimous All-American. In addition, he was a unanimous first-team All-ACC selection and was also a finalist for the Walter Camp Award.

=== Statistics ===
Legend
| | Led NCAA Division I FBS |
| **Bold** | Career high |

| Year | Team | Games | | Rushing | | | | Receiving | | | |
| Year | Team | GP | GS | Att | Yards | Avg | TD | Rec | Yards | Avg | TD |
|---|---|---|---|---|---|---|---|---|---|---|---|
| 2010 | Boston College | **13** | 1 | 95 | 461 | 4.9 | 2 | **4** | 15 | 3.8 | 0 |
| 2011 | Boston College | 10 | 7 | 124 | 517 | 4.2 | 4 | 2 | 11 | 5.5 | 0 |
| 2012 | Boston College | 9 | 8 | 130 | 584 | 4.5 | 4 | **4** | **34** | **8.5** | 0 |
| 2013 | Boston College | **13** | **13** | **355** | **2,177** | **6.1** | **18** | 0 | 0 | 0.0 | 0 |
| Career | | 44 | 29 | 704 | 3,739 | 5.3 | 28 | 10 | 60 | 6.0 | 0 |

== Professional career ==
Pre-draft measurables
| Height | Weight | Arm length | Hand span | 40-yard dash | 10-yard split | 20-yard split | 20-yard shuttle | Three-cone drill | Vertical jump | Broad jump | Wonderlic |
|---|---|---|---|---|---|---|---|---|---|---|---|
| 5 ft 11 3/8 in (1.81 m) | 230 lb (104 kg) | 33 1/2 in (0.85 m) | 9 in (0.23 m) | 4.54 s | 1.58 s | 2.58 s | 4.06 s | 7.27 s | 38 in (0.97 m) | 10 ft 9 in (3.28 m) | 23 |
All values from NFL Combine/Pro Day

=== New York Giants ===
The New York Giants selected Williams in the fourth round with the 113th overall pick of the 2014 NFL draft. He made his NFL debut in the season opener against the Detroit Lions. In the 35–14 loss, he had five carries for nine yards.

On September 25, in a 45–14 victory over the Washington Redskins, he scored his first professional rushing touchdown. On December 7, against the Tennessee Titans, he had 24 carries for 131 rushing yards and a rushing touchdown in the 36–7 victory. Overall, he finished his rookie season with 721 rushing yards and seven rushing touchdowns. His production dipped in his second season as he recorded 88 carries for 257 yards and a rushing touchdown. He was released by the team on September 3, 2016.

=== San Diego/Los Angeles Chargers ===
On September 4, 2016, the San Diego Chargers claimed Williams off waivers. He was released on September 24, 2016, and was signed to the practice squad two days later. He was promoted to the active roster on December 27, 2016. He appeared in the regular season finale against the Kansas City Chiefs and had 18 carries for 87 rushing yards.

On March 9, 2017, the Chargers re-signed Williams. He was waived on September 2, 2017, and was signed to the Chargers' practice squad the next day. He was promoted to the active roster on October 7, 2017. In Week 14, Williams suffered a broken wrist on the final play of the game and was ruled out for the rest of the 2017 season. He was placed on injured reserve on December 12, 2017. Overall, he finished the 2017 season with nine carries for 25 yards in eight games.

=== Houston Roughnecks ===
Williams was selected by the Houston Roughnecks of the XFL in the 9th round in the 2020 XFL draft. He had his contract terminated when the league suspended operations on April 10, 2020.

== Personal life ==
Since his college years, Williams had been writing what he calls a "philosophical memoir", which is titled A King, a Queen and a Conscience. As of 2014, he expected to complete the manuscript in 2015, but it has not been published. Williams also sought to secure a patent for a "compression shirt" type of athletic gear that could improve backfield running.

In 2014, Williams married Carolyn Jay, who also attended Boston College. His first child, Barron Zavier, was born in February 2016. Six months later, Williams and Jay filed for divorce. In 2018, Williams had a second son, Ka'el Malik, with his longtime friend Deshonia Peavy.

== See also ==
- List of NCAA major college football yearly rushing leaders
