= Island Coast High School =

Coordinates: 26.727196°N 81.929302°W

Location
- 2125 De Navarra Parkway 33909; Cape Coral, Florida; United States

Information
- Type: Public Secondary
- Established: 2007
- School district: Lee County School District
- Principal: Michelle Cort-Mora
- Staff: 57.00 (FTE)
- Grades: 9–12
- Enrollment: 1,418 (2023-2024)
- Student to teacher ratio: 24.88
- Campus: Suburban
- Colors: Forest Green and Vegas Gold
- Mascot: Gator
- Website: https://ich.leeschools.net/

Island Coast High School is located in Cape Coral, Florida. It is one of four high schools in the city of Cape Coral and is also a part of the Lee County School District. Total enrollment is 1,615 students as of July 2018. It is the newest high school in Cape Coral.

== Academics ==
The College Board's EQ project reports that in order to do effective work in college, it is essential that all students master the following Academic Competencies:

- Reading
- Writing
- Speaking and listening
- Mathematics
- Reasoning
- Computer competency

The school also offers free tutoring to students in several subjects.

== Majors ==
- AA Degree
- Foreign Languages (American Sign Language, French, German, Spanish)
- Advanced Placement Major
- Language Arts
- Agriscience and Natural Resources Education
- Mathematics
- Arts - Visual Arts
- Multimedia
- Athletic Training
- Music
- Business Technology Education
- Physical Education
- Coach Training
- Pre-Law
- College Preparatory/Humanities Concentration
- ROTC and Leadership Training Science
- College Preparatory/Science Concentration
- Science
- Digital Design
- Social Studies
- Drama - Theatre Arts
- Sports Medicine
- English and Journalism
- Television Production
- Environmental Science
- Workforce Readiness (ESE)
- Environmental Studies
- Fine Arts

== Sports ==
In their first year of varsity football, the Island Coast football team won the district title and hosted its first play-off game. The team ultimately lost 28–0, yet most of the team returns to build on the previous year's success. The boys varsity baseball team won its district in it first varsity year (2010). The Island Coast football team, in its 2nd varsity year (2010), came within one game of the 2B state championship. In 2022, the Island Coast baseball team won the state championship, 8-7, against Jensen Beach.

== Campus ==
Actual construction began in mid-April, 2007. The school was completed in mid-June, 2008. Total costs were at about $63-million. It is 272,000 square feet (25,300 m^{2}), with a 50-acre (200,000 m^{2}) campus. There are 3 floors but the school was designed to allow an additional two floors to be built on top. The school has a capacity of about 2,000 students.

== Notable alumni ==
- Aaron Lynch- Defensive End for the National Football League
- Kurt Benkert- Quarterback for the Green Bay Packers
