= Kevin Smith (wide receiver) =

American football player (born 1991)

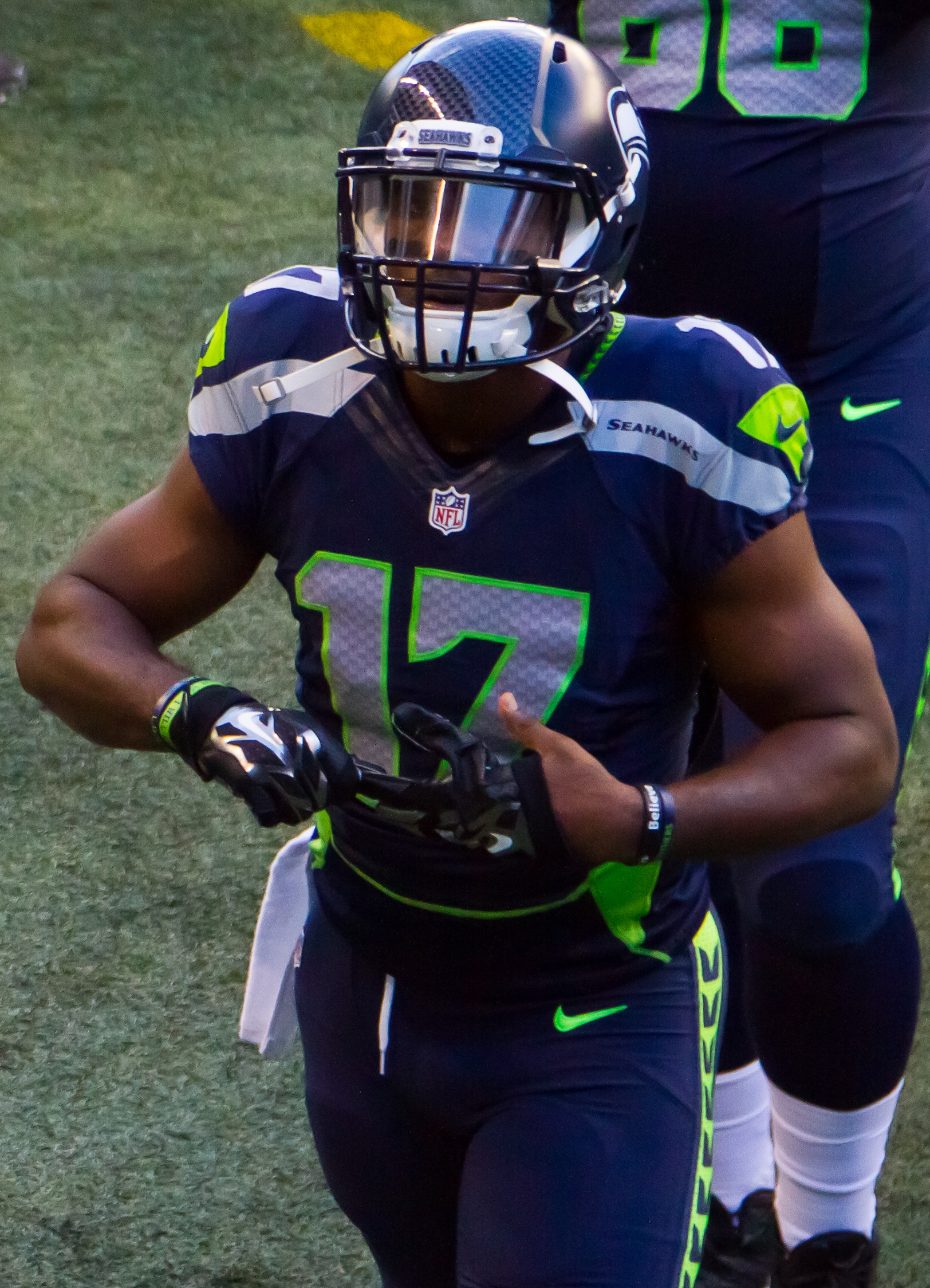
- Smith with the Seattle Seahawks in 2015

No. 17
- Position: Wide receiver

Personal information
- Born: December 21, 1991 (age 34); Compton, California, U.S.
- Listed height: 6 ft 0 in (1.83 m)
- Listed weight: 218 lb (99 kg)

Career information
- High school: Centennial (Compton)
- College: Washington
- NFL draft: 2014: undrafted

Career history
- Arizona Cardinals (2014)*; Jacksonville Jaguars (2014)*; Seattle Seahawks (2014)*; Los Angeles KISS (2015)*; Seattle Seahawks (2015–2016); Columbus Destroyers (2019)*
- * Offseason or practice squad member only

Career NFL statistics
- Receptions: 3
- Receiving yards: 43
- Stats at Pro Football Reference

Kevin Smith (born December 21, 1991) is an American former professional football player who was a wide receiver in the National Football League (NFL). He played college football for the Washington Huskies.

== Professional career ==
Pre-draft measurables
Height	Weight	Arm length	Hand span	Wingspan	40-yard dash	10-yard split	20-yard split	20-yard shuttle	Three-cone drill	Vertical jump	Broad jump	Bench press
5 ft 11 1/2 in (1.82 m)	208 lb (94 kg)	30 7/8 in (0.78 m)	9 1/8 in (0.23 m)	6 ft 3 1/2 in (1.92 m)	4.54 s	1.54 s	2.60 s	4.36 s	6.96 s	37.0 in (0.94 m)	10 ft 6 in (3.20 m)	10 reps
All values from Pro Day

=== Arizona Cardinals ===
On May 12, 2014, Smith signed with the Arizona Cardinals as an undrafted free agent. On June 6, he was waived by the Cardinals.

=== Jacksonville Jaguars ===
On June 5, 2014, Smith was claimed off waivers by the Jacksonville Jaguars. On June 19, he was waived by the Jaguars.

=== Seattle Seahawks ===
On June 25, 2014, Smith was signed to the Seattle Seahawks. On August 26, he was waived by the Seahawks.

=== Seattle Seahawks (second stint) ===
On February 10, 2015, Smith signed a reserve/future contract with the Seattle Seahawks. On September 5, Smith was waived by the Seahawks and re-signed to the practice squad the following day. On November 17, Smith was elevated to the active roster. In Week 11 against the Pittsburgh Steelers, Smith recorded his first NFL reception for 21 yards. On August 30, 2016, he was placed on injured reserve and released from injured reserve four days later. Smith was re-signed to the practice squad on November 29 and released the following week.

=== Columbus Destroyers ===
On March 11, 2019, Smith was assigned to the Columbus Destroyers. On April 20, he was placed on reassignment.
