= Ka'Deem Carey =

American football player (born 1992)

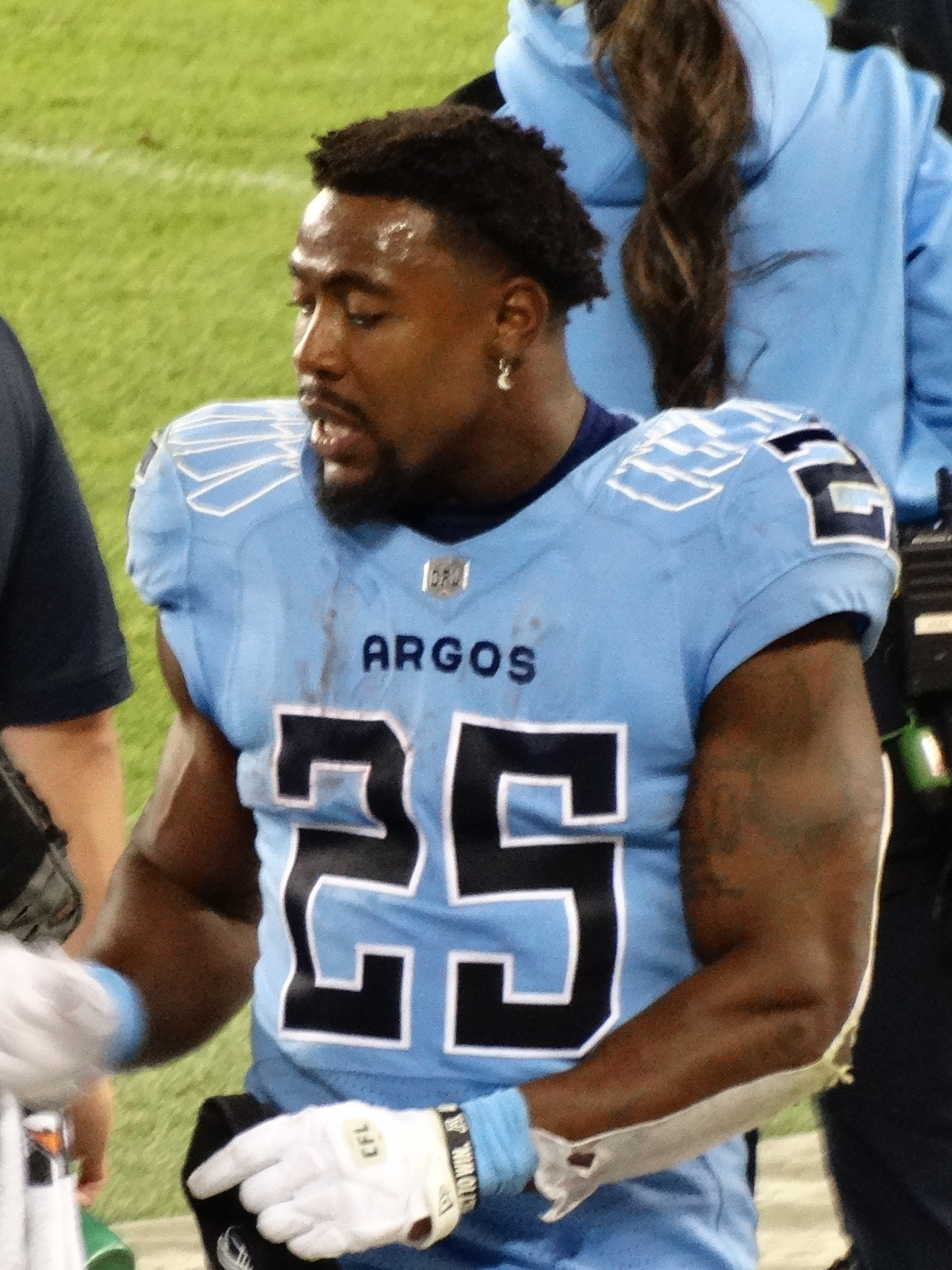
- Carey with the Toronto Argonauts in 2024

Toronto Argonauts
- Title: Running backs coach

Personal information
- Born: October 30, 1992 (age 34); Tucson, Arizona, U.S.
- Listed height: 5 ft 9 in (1.75 m)
- Listed weight: 215 lb (98 kg)

Career information
- Position: Running back (No. 25, 35, 29)
- High school: Canyon del Oro (Oro Valley, Arizona)
- College: Arizona (2011–2013)
- NFL draft: 2014: 4th round, 117th overall pick

Career history

Playing
- Chicago Bears (2014–2016); Calgary Stampeders (2018–2023); Toronto Argonauts (2024); Saskatchewan Roughriders (2025)

Coaching
- Toronto Argonauts (2026–present) Running backs coach

Awards and highlights
- 3× Grey Cup champion (2018, 2024, 2025); 2× Eddie James Memorial Trophy (2021, 2022); CFL All-Star (2022); 2× CFL West All-Star (2021, 2022); CFL East All-Star (2024); CFL rushing yards leader (2022); 2× Consensus All-American (2012, 2013); Pac-12 Offensive Player of the Year (2013); 2× First-team All-Pac-12 (2012, 2013)

Career NFL statistics
- Rushing yards: 443
- Rushing average: 4.0
- Rushing touchdowns: 2
- Receptions: 13
- Receiving yards: 131
- Receiving touchdowns: 1
- Stats at Pro Football Reference

Career CFL statistics
- Rushing yards: 3,956
- Rushing average: 5.7
- Rushing touchdowns: 26
- Receptions: 128
- Receiving yards: 1,097
- Stats at CFL.ca

Ka'Deem Carey (born October 30, 1992) is an American former professional football player who was a running back in the National Football League (NFL) and Canadian Football League (CFL). He is the running backs coach for the Toronto Argonauts. He played college football for the Arizona Wildcats, twice earning consensus All-American honors. He was selected by the Chicago Bears in the fourth round of the 2014 NFL draft. He played three seasons with the Bears before joining the Calgary Stampeders, and played one season with the Argonauts in 2024 and the Saskatchewan Roughriders in 2025.

== Early life ==
Carey attended Canyon del Oro High School in Oro Valley, Arizona. As a junior, he rushed for 2,738 yards on 224 carries with 45 touchdowns. As a senior, he rushed for 1,754 yards with 26 touchdowns.

College recruiting
Name	Hometown	School	Height	Weight	40^{‡}	Commit date
Ka'Deem Carey; RB	Tucson, AZ	Canyon del Oro	5 ft 9 in (1.75 m)	184 lb (83 kg)	4.6	Feb 2, 2011
Ka'Deem Carey; RB	Recruit ratings: Scout: Rivals: (78)					
Overall recruit ranking: Scout: 55 (RB) Rivals: 13 (RB) ESPN: 33 (RB)
‡ Refers to 40-yard dash; Note: In many cases, Scout, Rivals, 247Sports, On3, and ESPN may conflict in their listings of height, weight and 40 time.; In these cases, the average was taken. ESPN grades are on a 100-point scale.; Sources: "2011 Team Ranking". Rivals.com.

== College career ==
Carey attended the University of Arizona, where he played for the Arizona Wildcats football team from 2011 to 2013. As a true freshman in 2011, Carey rushed for 425 yards on 91 carries with six touchdowns. In 13 games of his sophomore season in 2012, he rushed for 1,929 yards on 303 carries with 23 touchdowns, which broke the Arizona single-season record for both rushing yards and rushing touchdowns. On November 10, 2012, Carey set the Pac-12 Conference record for rushing yards in a game with 366. On December 11, 2012 Carey was named a 2012 consensus All-American at the running back position.

In January 2013, he pleaded not guilty to misdemeanor assault and disorderly conduct charges stemming from an alleged domestic violence. Charges were dropped in June.

Carey served a one-game suspension to start the 2013 football season. During the season, he set a school record for rushing yards and rushing touchdowns. He finished the season with 1,885 yards on 349 carries and 19 touchdowns and was a consensus All-American for the second straight season.

=== Statistics ===
Year	Team	Games		Rushing					Receiving				
Year	Team	GP	GS	Att	Yds	Avg	Lng	TD	Rec	Yds	Avg	Lng	TD
2011	Arizona	11	0	91	425	4.7	33	6	15	203	13.5	41	2
2012	Arizona	13	13	303	1,929	6.4	73	23	36	303	8.4	47	1
2013	Arizona	12	11	349	1,885	5.4	58	19	26	173	14.4	24	1
Career		36	24	743	4,239	5.7	73	48	77	679	8.8	47	4

== Professional career ==
=== Pre-draft ===
On January 13, 2014, Carey announced that he would forgo his senior season and enter the 2014 NFL draft.

Pre-draft measurables
Height	Weight	Arm length	Hand span	Wingspan	40-yard dash	10-yard split	20-yard split	20-yard shuttle	Three-cone drill	Vertical jump	Broad jump	Bench press
5 ft 9 3/8 in (1.76 m)	207 lb (94 kg)	31 3/4 in (0.81 m)	9 1/2 in (0.24 m)	6 ft 3 5/8 in (1.92 m)	4.70 s	1.59 s	2.72 s	4.38 s	7.08 s	35.0 in (0.89 m)	9 ft 7 in (2.92 m)	19 reps
All values from NFL Combine/Pro Day

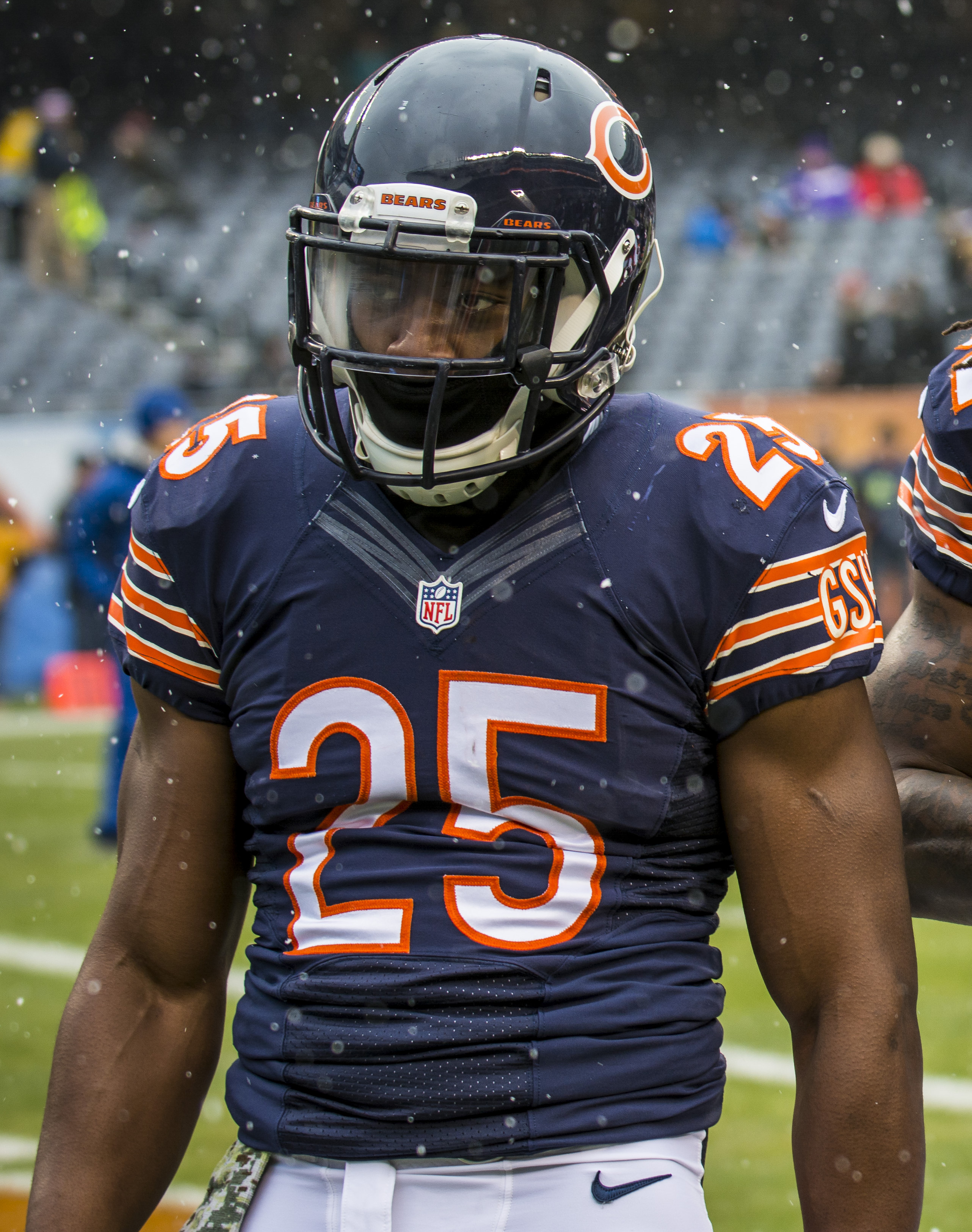
Carey with the Chicago Bears in 2014

=== Chicago Bears ===
Carey was selected by the Chicago Bears in the fourth round with the 117th overall pick of the 2014 NFL draft. Carey signed a four-year contract on May 13, 2014. In week 13 of 2015, Carey scored his first career rushing touchdown against the San Francisco 49ers on a four-yard run. On December 27, 2015, Carey recorded his first career receiving touchdown in a 26–21 win against the Tampa Bay Buccaneers.

On September 2, 2017, Carey was placed on injured reserve. He was released by the team on September 8, 2017.

=== Calgary Stampeders ===
Carey signed with the Calgary Stampeders of the Canadian Football League (CFL) in early October 2018, nearing the end of the 2018 CFL season. Carey did not play for the Stampeders in 2018, but was on the roster as the team won the 106th Grey Cup. He was re-signed by the club on January 16, 2019, which prevented him from becoming a free agent the following month. In 2019, Carey started to make an impact on offense and was Calgary's leading rusher by midway through the season. On September 23, 2019, the Stampeders announced that Carey would miss the remainder of the season after suffering a broken arm. Carey played in eight games for the Stampeders in 2019, carrying the ball 75 times for 422 yards with two touchdowns; he also caught 15 passes for 134 yards and a touchdown.

After six years as a member of the Stampeders, which included two divisional All-Star awards and a CFL All-Star award, Carey became a free agent on February 13, 2024.

=== Toronto Argonauts ===
On February 14, 2024, it was announced that Carey had signed with the Toronto Argonauts. On June 22, Carey rushed for 104 yards on 19 attempts and a touchdown in a 39–36 win over the Edmonton Elks. He played in all 18 regular season games where he recorded 191 carries for 1,060 yards and seven touchdowns along with 37 receptions for 356 yards and one touchdown. For his strong season, he was named a Divisional All-Star for the third time in his career. He also played in all three post-season games, including the 111th Grey Cup where he had 15 rush attempts for 79 yards and a touchdown and three catches for ten yards in the Argonauts 41–24 victory over the Winnipeg Blue Bombers. He was with the team in training camp in 2025, but was part of the final cuts on June 1, 2025.

=== Saskatchewan Roughriders ===
On June 9, 2025, Carey officially signed with the Saskatchewan Roughriders.

He suffered a season-ending knee injury in a game against the BC Lions on July 19, 2025, appearing in just three games for Saskatchewan.

Carey would not return to Saskatchewan the following offseason, instead retiring and beginning his transition from player to coach.

== Coaching career ==
Carey marked the end of his playing career with an announcement he was rejoining the Toronto Argonauts as a running backs coach on January 8, 2026.

== Career statistics ==
=== NFL ===
Regular season statistics
Year	Team	Games		Rushing					Receiving				
Year	Team	GP	GS	Att	Yds	Avg	Lng	TD	Rec	Yds	Avg	Lng	TD
2014	CHI	14	0	36	158	4.4	15	0	5	57	11.4	18	0
2015	CHI	11	1	43	159	3.7	11	2	3	19	6.3	11	1
2016	CHI	12	0	32	126	3.9	24	0	5	55	11.0	16	0
Career		37	1	111	443	3.0	24	2	13	131	10.1	18	1

=== CFL ===
Regular season statistics
Year	Team	Games		Rushing					Receiving				
Year	Team	GP	GS	Att	Yds	Avg	Lng	TD	Rec	Yds	Avg	Lng	TD
2018	CGY	DNP											
2019	CGY	8	7	75	422	5.6	31	2	15	134	8.9	23	1
2020	CGY	Season cancelled											
2021	CGY	13	13	164	869	5.3	29	7	26	194	7.5	29	0
2022	CGY	14	14	164	1,088	6.6	40	10	28	248	8.9	28	0
2023	CGY	9	9	89	476	5.4	19	0	21	156	7.4	22	0
2024	TOR	18	17	191	1,060	5.6	32	7	37	356	9.6	27	1
2025	SSK	3	0	9	41	4.6	15	0	1	9	9.0	9	0
Career		65	60	692	3,956	5.7	40	26	128	1,097	8.6	29	2

Postseason statistics
Year	Team	Games		Rushing					Receiving				
Year	Team	GP	GS	Att	Yds	Avg	Lng	TD	Rec	Yds	Avg	Lng	TD
2018	CGY	DNP											
2019	CGY	DNP											
2021	CGY	1	1	22	117	5.3	15	2	3	19	6.3	13	0
2022	CGY	1	1	8	43	5.4	13	0	2	41	20.5	32	0
2023	CGY	1	1	14	75	5.4	20	0	4	11	2.8	18	0
2024	TOR	3	3	36	214	5.9	49	1	4	7	1.8	7	0
2025	SSK	DNP											
Career		6	6	80	449	5.6	49	3	13	78	6.0	32	0

== See also ==
- List of NCAA major college football yearly rushing leaders
- List of Canadian Football League annual rushing leaders
