= UCLA Bruins football statistical leaders =

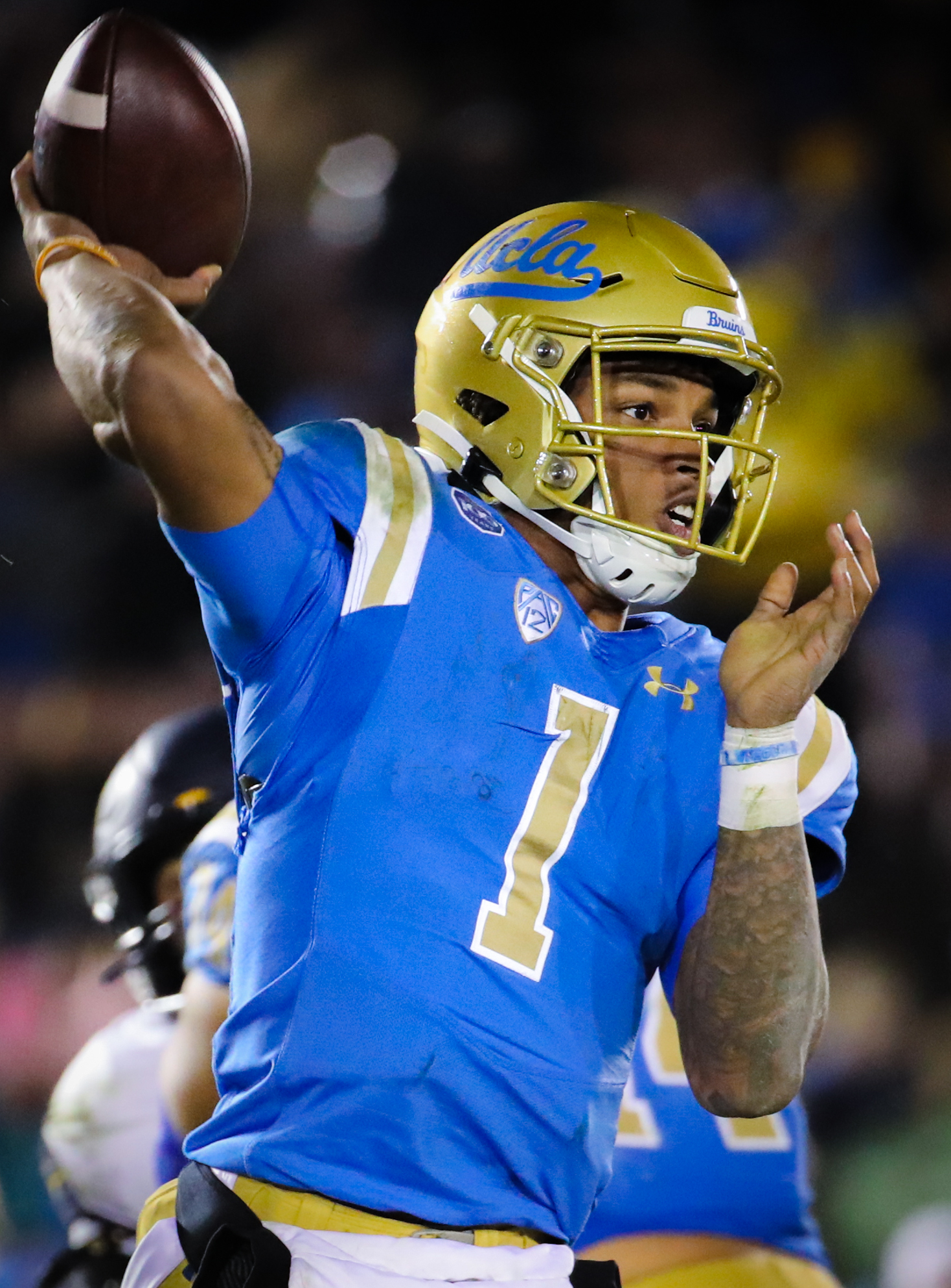
Dorian Thompson-Robinson holds the UCLA record for passing touchdowns and is second on the passing yards list.

The UCLA Bruins football statistical leaders are individual statistical leaders of the UCLA Bruins football program in various categories, including passing, rushing, receiving, total offense, defensive stats, and kicking. Within those areas, the lists identify single-game, single-season, and career leaders. The Bruins represent the University of California, Los Angeles in the NCAA's Pac-12 Conference.

Although UCLA began competing in intercollegiate football in 1919, these lists are dominated by more recent players for several reasons:

- Since 1919, seasons have increased from 8 games to 11 and then 12 games in length.
- The NCAA didn't allow freshmen to play varsity football until 1972 (with the exception of the World War II years), allowing players to have four-year careers.
- Bowl games only began counting toward single-season and career statistics in 2002. The Bruins have played in 11 bowl games since this decision, giving many recent players an extra game to accumulate statistics.

These lists are updated through the end of the 2025 season.

== Passing ==
=== Passing yards ===
Career
Rk	Player	Yards	Years
1	Cade McNown	10,708	1995 1996 1997 1998
2	Dorian Thompson-Robinson	10,695	2018 2019 2020 2021 2022
3	Brett Hundley	9,966	2012 2013 2014
4	Josh Rosen	9,341	2015 2016 2017
5	Drew Olson	8,532	2002 2003 2004 2005
6	Cory Paus	6,877	1999 2000 2001 2002
7	Tom Ramsey	6,168	1979 1980 1981 1982
8	Tommy Maddox	5,363	1990 1991
9	Troy Aikman	5,298	1987 1988
10	Wayne Cook	4,723	1991 1992 1993 1994

Single season
Rk	Player	Yards	Year
1	Josh Rosen	3,756	2017
2	Brett Hundley	3,740	2012
3	Josh Rosen	3,668	2015
4	Cade McNown	3,470	1998
5	Drew Olson	3,198	2005
6	Brett Hundley	3,155	2014
7	Dorian Thompson-Robinson	3,154	2022
8	Cade McNown	3,116	1997
9	Brett Hundley	3,071	2013
10	Tom Ramsey	2,986	1982

Single game
Rk	Player	Yards	Year	Opponent
1	Cade McNown	513	1998	Miami
2	Drew Olson	510	2005	Arizona State
3	Dorian Thompson-Robinson	507	2019	Washington State
4	Josh Rosen	491	2017	Texas A&M
5	Josh Rosen	480	2017	Stanford
6	Wilton Speight	466	2018	Stanford
7	Mike Fafaul	464	2016	Utah
8	Josh Rosen	463	2017	Memphis
9	Josh Rosen	421	2017	USC
10	Brett Hundley	410	2013	California

=== Passing touchdowns ===
Career
Rk	Player	TDs	Years
1	Dorian Thompson-Robinson	88	2018 2019 2020 2021 2022
2	Brett Hundley	75	2012 2013 2014
3	Cade McNown	68	1995 1996 1997 1998
4	Drew Olson	67	2002 2003 2004 2005
5	Josh Rosen	59	2015 2016 2017
6	Tom Ramsey	50	1979 1980 1981 1982
7	Troy Aikman	41	1987 1988
	Cory Paus	41	1999 2000 2001 2002
9	Wayne Cook	34	1991 1992 1993 1994
10	Tommy Maddox	33	1990 1991

Single season
Rk	Player	TDs	Year
1	Drew Olson	34	2005
2	Brett Hundley	29	2012
3	Dorian Thompson-Robinson	27	2022
4	Josh Rosen	26	2017
5	Cade McNown	25	1998
6	Troy Aikman	24	1988
	Cade McNown	24	1997
	Brett Hundley	24	2013
9	Josh Rosen	23	2015
10	Brett Hundley	22	2014

Single game
Rk	Player	TDs	Year	Opponent
1	Drew Olson	6	2005	Oregon State
2	Cade McNown	5	1998	Miami
	Drew Olson	5	2005	Washington State
	Drew Olson	5	2005	Arizona State
	Ben Olson	5	2007	Stanford
	Mike Fafaul	5	2016	Utah
	Josh Rosen	5	2017	Hawai'i
	Dorian Thompson-Robinson	5	2019	Washington State

== Rushing ==
=== Rushing yards ===
Career
Rk	Player	Yards	Years
1	Johnathan Franklin	4,403	2009 2010 2011 2012
2	Gaston Green	3,731	1984 1985 1986 1987
3	Paul Perkins	3,611	2013 2014 2015
4	Freeman McNeil	3,195	1977 1978 1979 1980
5	DeShaun Foster	3,194	1998 1999 2000 2001
6	Karim Abdul-Jabbar	3,182	1992 1993 1994 1995
7	Wendell Tyler	3,181	1973 1974 1975 1976
8	Skip Hicks	3,140	1993 1994 1996 1997
9	Theotis Brown	2,914	1976 1977 1978
10	Chris Markey	2,733	2004 2005 2006 2007

Single season
Rk	Player	Yards	Year
1	Johnathan Franklin	1,734	2012
2	Paul Perkins	1,575	2014
3	Karim Abdul-Jabbar	1,571	1995
4	Gaston Green	1,405	1986
5	Freeman McNeil	1,396	1979
6	Wendell Tyler	1,388	1975
7	Zach Charbonnet	1,359	2022
8	Paul Perkins	1,343	2015
9	Theotis Brown	1,283	1978
10	Skip Hicks	1,282	1997

Single game
Rk	Player	Yards	Year	Opponent
1	Maurice Jones-Drew	322	2004	Washington
2	DeShaun Foster	301	2001	Washington
3	Joshua Kelley	289	2018	USC
4	Theotis Brown	274	1978	Oregon
5	Gaston Green	266	1986	BYU
6	Karim Abdul-Jabbar	261	1995	Stanford
7	Freeman McNeil	248	1980	Stanford
8	Eric Ball	227	1985	Iowa
	Chris Alexander	227	1992	Oregon State
10	Gaston Green	224	1986	USC

=== Rushing touchdowns ===
Career
Rk	Player	TDs	Years
1	Skip Hicks	48	1993 1994 1996 1997
2	DeShaun Foster	39	1998 1999 2000 2001
3	Gaston Green	37	1984 1985 1986 1987
4	Gary Beban	35	1965 1966 1967
5	Johnathan Franklin	31	2009 2010 2011 2012
6	Brett Hundley	30	2012 2013 2014
7	Paul Perkins	29	2013 2014 2015
8	Dorian Thompson-Robinson	28	2018 2019 2020 2021 2022
9	Zach Charbonnet	27	2021 2022
10	Eric Ball	26	1984 1985 1986 1987 1988
	Maurice Jones-Drew	26	2003 2004 2005

Single season
Rk	Player	TDs	Year
1	Skip Hicks	22	1997
2	Gaston Green	17	1986
	Skip Hicks	17	1996

Single game
Rk	Player	TDs	Year	Opponent
1	Maurice Jones-Drew	5	2004	Washington

== Receiving ==
=== Receptions ===
Career
Rk	Player	Rec	Years
1	Jordan Payton	201	2012 2013 2014 2015
2	Craig Bragg	193	2001 2002 2003 2004
3	Kevin Jordan	179	1992 1993 1994 1995
4	Kyle Philips	163	2018 2019 2020 2021
5	Darren Andrews	162	2013 2015 2016 2017
6	Danny Farmer	159	1996 1997 1998 1999
7	J. J. Stokes	154	1991 1992 1993 1994
8	Nelson Rosario	146	2008 2009 2010 2011
	Devin Fuller	146	2012 2013 2014 2015
10	Sean LaChapelle	142	1989 1990 1991 1992

Single season
Rk	Player	Rec	Year
1	J. J. Stokes	82	1993
2	Jordan Payton	78	2015
3	Freddie Mitchell	77	2000
4	Sean LaChapelle	73	1991
	Kevin Jordan	73	1994
	Craig Bragg	73	2003
7	Jordan Lasley	69	2017
8	Jordan Payton	67	2014
9	Mike Farr	66	1988
10	Nelson Rosario	64	2011

Single game
Rk	Player	Rec	Year	Opponent
1	J. J. Stokes	14	1994	Rose Bowl Wisconsin
	Jordan Payton	14	2015	Washington State
3	Jordan Lasley	12	2017	California
4	Rick Wilkes	11	1970	USC
	Sean LaChapelle	11	1991	Arizona State
	Marcedes Lewis	11	2005	Arizona
	Jordan Lasley	11	2017	Stanford
	Caleb Wilson	11	2018	Arizona State

=== Receiving yards ===
Career
Rk	Player	Yards	Years
1	Danny Farmer	3,020	1996 1997 1998 1999
2	Craig Bragg	2,845	2001 2002 2003 2004
3	Jordan Payton	2,701	2012 2013 2014 2015
4	Kevin Jordan	2,548	1992 1993 1994 1995
5	J. J. Stokes	2,469	1991 1992 1993 1994
6	Nelson Rosario	2,362	2008 2009 2010 2011
7	Freddie Mitchell	2,135	1998 1999 2000
8	Brian Poli-Dixon	2,127	1997 1998 1999 2000 2001
9	Jim McElroy	2,029	1994 1995 1996 1997
10	Sean LaChapelle	2,027	1989 1990 1991 1992

Single season
Rk	Player	Yards	Year
1	Freddie Mitchell	1,494	2000
2	Danny Farmer	1,274	1998
3	Jordan Lasley	1,264	2017
4	Kevin Jordan	1,228	1994
5	J. J. Stokes	1,181	1993
6	Nelson Rosario	1,161	2011
7	Jordan Payton	1,105	2015
8	Craig Bragg	1,065	2003
9	Sean LaChapelle	1,056	1991
10	Jim McElroy	988	1997

Single game
Rk	Player	Yards	Year	Opponent
1	J. J. Stokes	263	1992	USC
2	Craig Bragg	230	2002	Oregon
3	Jordan Lasley	227	2017	California
4	Jordan Lasley	204	2017	USC
5	Danny Farmer	196	1999	Oregon
6	J. J. Stokes	190	1993	Washington
7	Freddie Mitchell	185	2000	Stanford
8	Caleb Wilson	184	2018	Stanford
9	Freddie Mitchell	180	2000	Wisconsin
10	J. J. Stokes	176	1993	Wisconsin
	Aidan Mizell	176	2026	Illinois

=== Receiving touchdowns ===
Career
Rk	Player	TDs	Years
1	J. J. Stokes	28	1991 1992 1993 1994
2	Marcedes Lewis	21	2002 2003 2004 2005
3	Jo-Jo Townsell	20	1979 1980 1981 1982
	Brian Poli-Dixon	20	1997 1998 1999 2000 2001
	Joseph Fauria	20	2010 2011 2012
6	Danny Farmer	19	1996 1997 1998 1999
	Craig Bragg	19	2001 2002 2003 2004
8	Thomas Duarte	17	2013 2014 2015
	Kyle Philips	17	2018 2019 2020 2021

Single season
Rk	Player	TDs	Year
1	J. J. Stokes	17	1993
2	Joseph Fauria	12	2012
3	Sean LaChapelle	11	1991
4	Jo-Jo Townsell	10	1982
	Jim McElroy	10	1997
	Brian Poli-Dixon	10	1998
	Marcedes Lewis	10	2005
	Thomas Duarte	10	2015
	Kyle Philips	10	2021

Single game
Rk	Player	TDs	Year	Opponent
1	J. J. Stokes	4	1993	Washington
1	Jo-Jo Townsell	4	1982	Long Beach State

== Total offense ==
Total offense is the sum of passing and rushing statistics. It does not include receiving or returns.

=== Total offense yards ===
Career
Rk	Player	Yards	Years
1	Dorian Thompson-Robinson	12,522	2018 2019 2020 2021 2022
2	Brett Hundley	11,713	2012 2013 2014
3	Cade McNown	11,285	1995 1996 1997 1998
4	Josh Rosen	9,187	2015 2016 2017
5	Drew Olson	8,324	2002 2003 2004 2005
6	Cory Paus	6,450	1999 2000 2001 2002
7	Tom Ramsey	6,255	1979 1980 1981 1982
8	Tommy Maddox	5,482	1990 1991
9	Gary Beban	5,358	1965 1966 1967
10	Troy Aikman	5,294	1987 1988

Single season
Rk	Player	Yards	Year
1	Brett Hundley	4,095	2012
2	Brett Hundley	3,819	2013
3	Dorian Thompson-Robinson	3,800	2022
4	Brett Hundley	3,799	2014
5	Josh Rosen	3,684	2015
6	Josh Rosen	3,659	2017
7	Cade McNown	3,652	1998
8	Drew Olson	3,150	2005
9	Cade McNown	3,142	1997
10	Tom Ramsey	3,124	1982

Single game
Rk	Player	Yards	Year	Opponent
1	Dorian Thompson-Robinson	564	2019	Washington State
2	Cade McNown	515	1998	Miami
3	Drew Olson	501	2005	Arizona State
4	Josh Rosen	495	2017	Stanford
	Josh Rosen	495	2017	Memphis
6	Mike Fafaul	487	2016	Utah
7	Josh Rosen	477	2017	Texas A&M
8	Tommy Maddox	445	1990	USC
9	Dorian Thompson-Robinson	431	2019	USC
	Ethan Garbers	431	2024	Rutgers

=== Total touchdowns ===
Career
Rk	Player	TDs	Years
1	Dorian Thompson-Robinson	116	2018 2019 2020 2021 2022
2	Brett Hundley	105	2012 2013 2014
3	Cade McNown	84	1995 1996 1997 1998
4	Drew Olson	69	2002 2003 2004 2005
5	Josh Rosen	65	2015 2016 2017
6	Tom Ramsey	63	1979 1980 1981 1982
7	Gary Beban	58	1965 1966 1967
8	Skip Hicks	48	1993 1994 1996 1997
9	Cory Paus	46	1999 2000 2001 2002
10	Troy Aikman	44	1987 1988

Single season
Rk	Player	TDs	Year
1	Dorian Thompson-Robinson	39	2022
2	Brett Hundley	38	2012
3	Drew Olson	35	2005
	Brett Hundley	35	2013
5	Brett Hundley	32	2014
6	Dorian Thompson-Robinson	30	2021
7	Tom Ramsey	28	1982
	Cade McNown	28	1997
	Cade McNown	28	1998
	Josh Rosen	28	2017

== Defense ==
=== Interceptions ===
Career
Rk	Player	Ints	Years
1	Kenny Easley	19	1977 1978 1979 1980
2	Carlton Gray	16	1989 1990 1991 1992
3	James Washington	15	1984 1985 1986 1987
4	Don Rogers	14	1980 1981 1982 1983
	Marcus Turner	14	1985 1986 1987 1988
	Eric Turner	14	1987 1988 1989 1990
	Rahim Moore	14	2008 2009 2010

Single season
Rk	Player	Ints	Year
1	Carlton Gray	11	1991
2	Rahim Moore	10	2009
3	Bob Stiles	9	1965
4	Bill Stits	8	1952
5	Bob Waterfield	7	1942
	Kenny Easley	7	1978
	Don Rogers	7	1983
	Marvin Goodwin	7	1993

=== Tackles ===
Career
Rk	Player	Tackles	Years
1	Eric Kendricks	481	2011 2012 2013 2014
2	Jerry Robinson	468	1975 1976 1977 1978
3	Don Rogers	405	1980 1981 1982 1983
4	Spencer Havner	402	2002 2003 2004 2005
5	Kenny Easley	374	1977 1978 1979 1980
6	Eric Turner	369	1987 1988 1989 1990
7	James Washington	347	1984 1985 1986 1987
8	Ken Norton Jr.	339	1984 1985 1986 1987
9	Matt Darby	332	1988 1989 1990 1991
10	Frank Stephens	313	1975 1976 1977

Single season
Rk	Player	Tackles	Year
1	Jerry Robinson	161	1978
2	Jerry Robinson	159	1976
3	Eric Kendricks	150	2012
4	Eric Kendricks	149	2014
5	Jerry Robinson	147	1977
6	Don Rogers	143	1983
	Craig Davis	143	1989
8	Eric Turner	141	1989
9	Frank Stephens	136	1977
	Carson Schwesinger	136	2024

Single game
Rk	Player	Tackles	Year	Opponent
1	Jerry Robinson	28	1976	Air Force
2	Jerry Robinson	23	1977	USC
3	Raymond Burks	21	1976	USC
	Jerry Robinson	21	1977	Kansas
	Jerry Robinson	21	1978	USC
	Eric Turner	21	1989	Oregon
7	Jerry Robinson	20	1978	Minnesota
	Reggie Carter	20	2008	BYU

=== Sacks ===
Career
Rk	Player	Sacks	Years
1	Dave Ball	30.5	2000 2001 2002 2003
2	Bruce Davis	29.0	2004 2005 2006 2007
3	Eric Smith	26.5	1984 1985 1986 1988
4	Carnell Lake	25.5	1985 1986 1987 1988
5	Terry Tumey	25.0	1984 1985 1986 1987
6	Jamir Miller	23.5	1991 1992 1993
	Anthony Barr	23.5	2010 2011 2012 2013
	Laiatu Latu	23.5	2022 2023
9	Donnie Edwards	22.5	1992 1993 1994 1995
10	Jim Wahler	21.0	1985 1986 1987 1988

Single season
Rk	Player	Sacks	Year
1	Dave Ball	16.5	2003
2	Anthony Barr	13.5	2012
3	Carnell Lake	13.0	1987
	Laiatu Latu	13.0	2023
5	Jamir Miller	12.5	1993
	Donnie Edwards	12.5	1994
	Bruce Davis	12.5	2006
	Justin Hickman	12.5	2006
9	Bruce Davis	12.0	2007

== Kicking ==
=== Field goals made ===
Career
Rk	Player	FGs	Years
1	John Lee	85	1982 1983 1984 1985
	Kai Forbath	85	2007 2008 2009 2010
3	Justin Medlock	70	2003 2004 2005 2006
4	Kaʻimi Fairbairn	68	2012 2013 2014 2015
5	Bjorn Merten	57	1993 1994 1995 1996
6	Alfredo Velasco	51	1986 1987 1988 1989
	JJ Molson	51	2016 2017 2018 2019
8	Chris Griffith	42	1999 2000 2001 2002
9	Mateen Bhaghani	36	2024 2025
10	Nicholas Barr-Mira	35	2020 2021 2022

Single season
Rk	Player	FGs	Year
1	John Lee	32	1984
2	Justin Medlock	28	2006
	Kai Forbath	28	2009
4	Kai Forbath	25	2007
5	John Lee	22	1985
6	Bjorn Merten	21	1993
7	Alfredo Velasco	20	1987
	Chris Sailer	20	1997
	Kaʻimi Fairbairn	20	2015
	Mateen Bhaghani	20	2024

=== Field goal percentage ===
Career
Rk	Player	FG%	Years
1	Nate Fiske	92.3%	1999 2000 2001 2002
2	John Lee	85.0%	1982 1983 1984 1985
3	Kai Forbath	84.2%	2007 2008 2009 2010
4	Mateen Bhaghani	81.8%	2024 2025
5	Justin Medlock	79.5%	2003 2004 2005 2006
6	Alfredo Velasco	78.5%	1986 1987 1988 1989
7	Kaʻimi Fairbairn	76.4%	2012 2013 2014 2015

Single season
Rk	Player	FG%	Year
1	Kai Forbath	90.3%	2009
2	Alfredo Velasco	89.5%	1988
3	John Lee	88.9%	1984
4	John Lee	88.0%	1985
5	Justin Medlock	87.5%	2006
6	Kai Forbath	86.4%	2008
7	Alfredo Velasco	83.3%	1987
	Kai Forbath	83.3%	2007
	Kaʻimi Fairbairn	83.3%	2015
	Mateen Bhaghani	83.3%	2024
