= Jordan Payton =

American football player (born 1993)

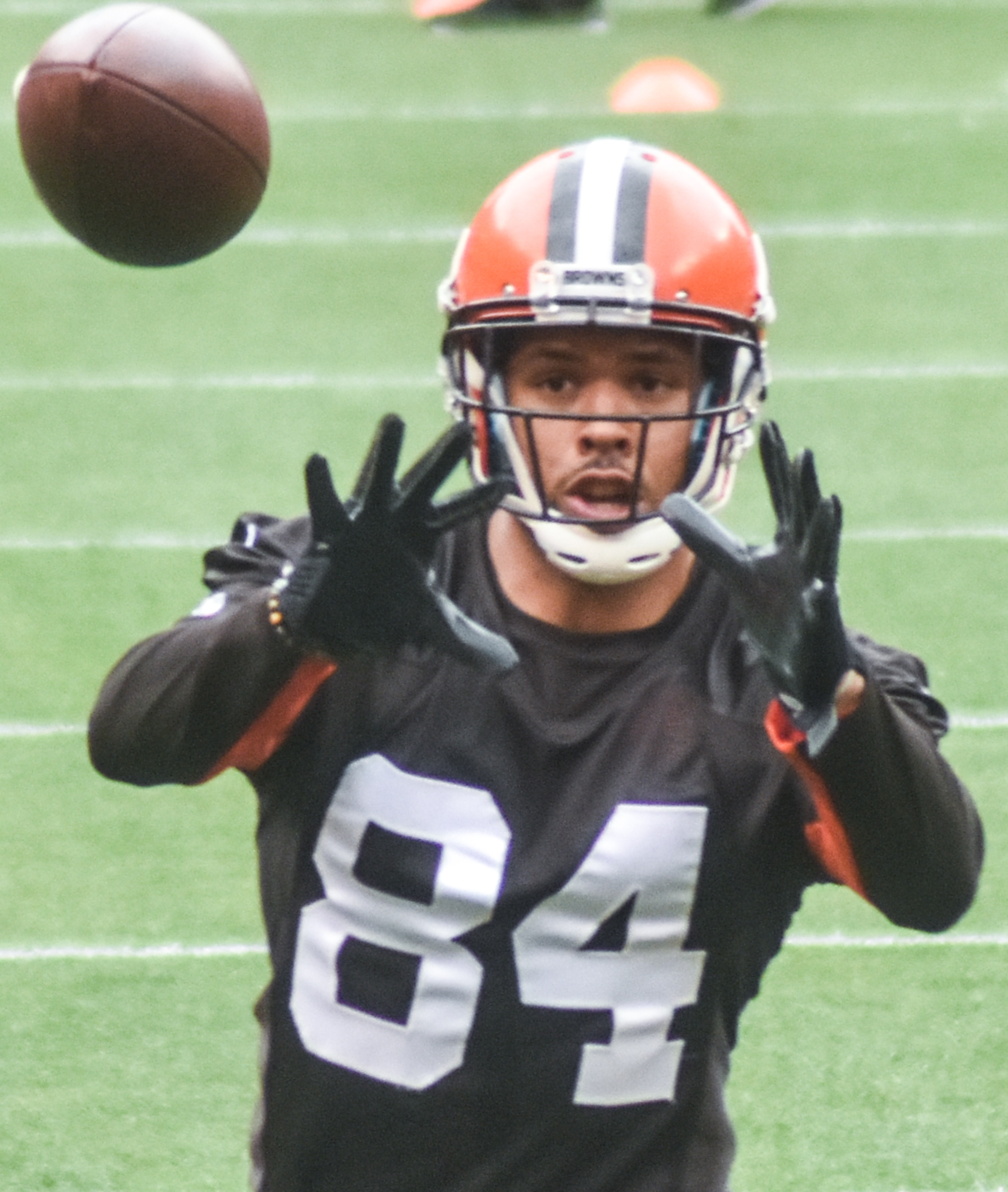
- Payton with the Cleveland Browns in 2016

No. 84
- Position: Wide receiver

Personal information
- Born: September 1, 1993 (age 33); Torrance, California, U.S.
- Listed height: 6 ft 1 in (1.85 m)
- Listed weight: 209 lb (95 kg)

Career information
- High school: Oaks Christian School (Westlake Village, California)
- College: UCLA
- NFL draft: 2016: 5th round, 154th overall pick

Career history
- Cleveland Browns (2016–2017)

Career NFL statistics
- Receptions: 1
- Receiving yards: 3
- Stats at Pro Football Reference

Jordan Joseph Payton (born September 1, 1993) is an American former professional football player who was a wide receiver for the Cleveland Browns in the National Football League (NFL). He played college football for the UCLA Bruins, ending his career as the school's leader in career receptions. Payton was selected by the Browns in the fifth round of the 2016 NFL draft.

== Early life ==
Payton was born in Torrance, California, in Los Angeles County to Kathy and Jerry Payton, who played linebacker at Crenshaw High. Payton played catch as a youngster with older brother Michael, who later played college football at Oregon State. As an eight-year-old playing Pop Warner football, Payton was a backup lineman when his mother convinced the coach to play him at wide receiver during a game which they were trailing at halftime. On his first play, he caught a deep pass for a touchdown.

Payton grew up in Santa Monica, California, but attended high school in Westlake Village at Oaks Christian School. As a sophomore, he had 45 receptions for 1,088 yards for a 24.5-yard average and 18 touchdowns. He also played at defensive back and had 30 tackles and three interceptions. He had two games with 10 or more receptions as a junior, and finished the year with a team-leading 61 receptions for 840 yards and 9 touchdowns. In his senior year, he caught 61 throws for 769 yards and 10 touchdowns.

Payton verbally committed to three other colleges before ending up with UCLA. As a junior, he committed to play college football with USC, but the school was subsequently hit by National Collegiate Athletic Association (NCAA) sanctions, and Coach Pete Carroll left for the National Football League (NFL). A senior in 2012, Payton was then set to play for California, but changed his commitment after Tosh Lupoi, one of the top recruiters in the nation, left the school for Washington. Payton announced on national television on ESPNU that he had decided to go to Washington, but he changed his mind again and settled on UCLA the following day. He took a chance on Bruins coach Jim Mora, who was hired only months earlier, and a program that USC had recently shutout 50–0. Payton was ranked No. 15 in the nation at wide receiver by both Scout.com and Rivals.com, and No. 29 by ESPNU.

== College career ==
Payton started 10 games as a sophomore in 2013 and ranked third on the team with 38 receptions and 440 yards. He did not put up extraordinary numbers, matching his freshman touchdown total of one.

As a junior in 2014, Jordan broke out in the season opener with eight catches for 98 yards, both career-highs at the time, in a 28–20 win over Virginia. He emerged as the Bruins' No. 1 receiver, finishing the season with 67 catches, the most by a Bruin since Craig Bragg had 73 in 2003. He also finished with team-highs of 954 receiving yards and seven touchdowns, and earned All-Pac-12 Conference honorable mention. Payton had three 100-yard games, and nine times he finished with at least five receptions. In a 62–27 win over Arizona State, he made five catches for 151 yards and two touchdowns.

Although three-year starting quarterback Brett Hundley was leaving school early for the 2015 NFL draft, Payton opted to return for his senior year in part due to the potential he saw in incoming freshman quarterback Josh Rosen. Prior to the 2015 season, Payton made the preseason watch list for the Fred Biletnikoff Award, given annually to the nation's top receiver. After needing a few games to develop a rapport with Rosen, he tied the single-game school record with 14 receptions, set originally by J. J. Stokes, for 152 yards in a 31–27 loss to Washington State. The following week, he had seven catches for 105 yards in a 17–9 win over Utah to pass Bragg (193) as the Bruins career leader in receptions. Payton also became UCLA's first player since Nelson Rosario in 2011 to reach 1,000 yards in a season. The victory kept UCLA in contention to win the conference entering their regular season finale against USC, but the Bruins lost 40–21 to the Trojans for Payton's lone loss in the crosstown rivalry. He ended the season with 78 catches, the second-highest season total in school history, and again received honorable mention for the all-conference team. He finished his career as the first Bruin with over 200 receptions (201).

== Professional career ==
Pre-draft measurables
| Height | Weight | Arm length | Hand span | 40-yard dash | 20-yard shuttle | Three-cone drill | Vertical jump | Broad jump |
|---|---|---|---|---|---|---|---|---|
| 6 ft 1 1/8 in (1.86 m) | 207 lb (94 kg) | 32 1/2 in (0.83 m) | 10 1/8 in (0.26 m) | 4.47 s | 4.33 s | 7.08 s | 34.5 in (0.88 m) | 10 ft 1 in (3.07 m) |
All values from NFL Combine

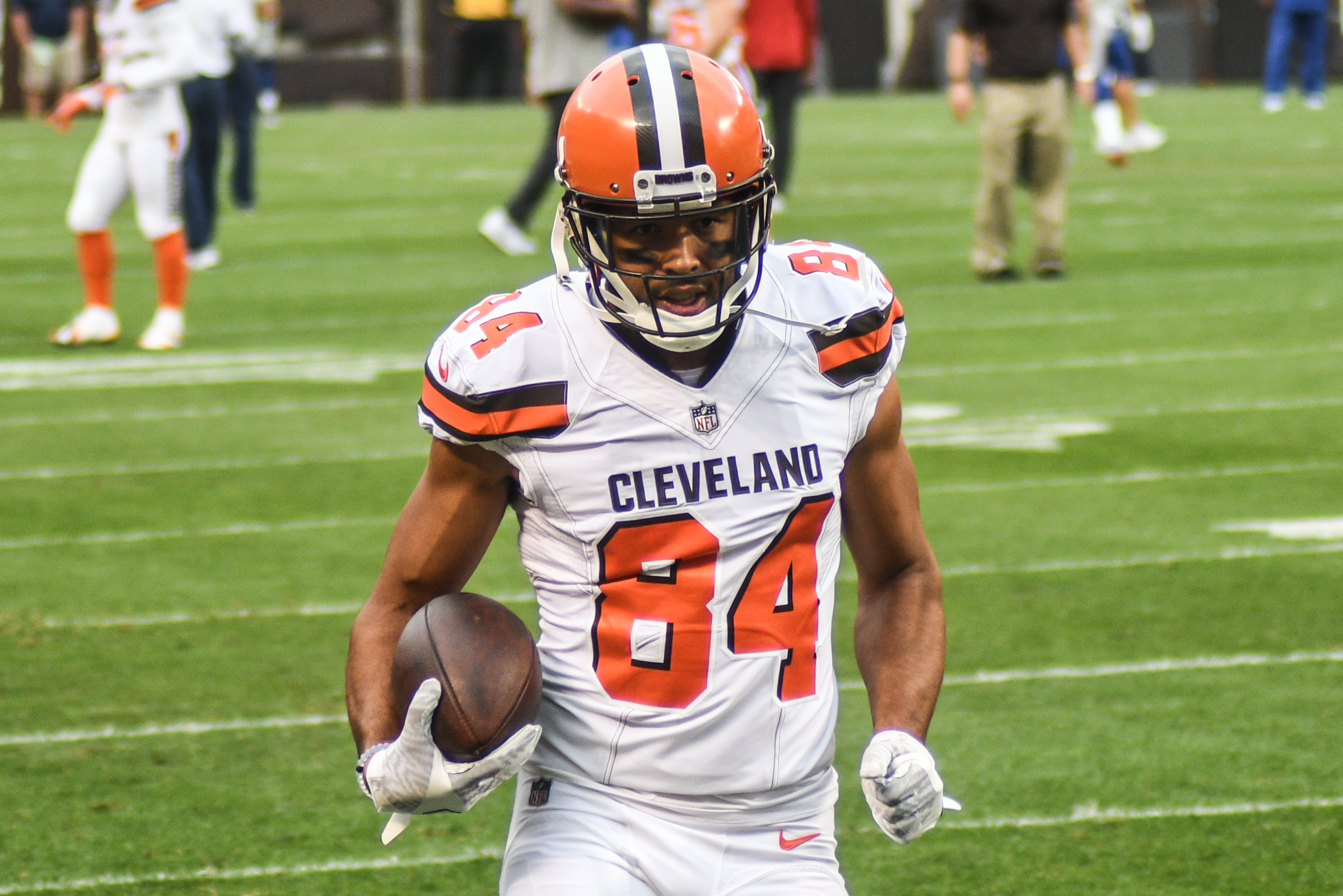
Payton in 2017 preseason

Payton was selected by the Cleveland Browns in the fifth round of the 2016 NFL draft, 154th overall. He was one of four receivers drafted by the team that year. On May 13, he signed a four-year contract worth about $2.58 million, which included a signing bonus of about $244,000. The Browns were coached by Hue Jackson, who was a former coach of Payton's role model and mentor, former NFL receiver T. J. Houshmandzadeh. Payton's brother Michael and Houshmandzadeh were college teammates at Oregon State. Payton was suspended the final four games of the 2016 season for violating the NFL's policy on performance-enhancing drugs. He finished his rookie season with one reception for three yards.

On September 2, 2017, Payton was waived by the Browns.
