= 2015 UCLA Bruins football team =

American college football season

2015 UCLA Bruins football

Foster Farms Bowl, L 29–37 vs. Nebraska
- Conference: Pac-12 Conference
- South Division
- Record: 8–5 (5–4 Pac-12)
- Head coach: Jim L. Mora (4th season)
- Offensive coordinator: Noel Mazzone (4th season)
- Offensive scheme: Multiple
- Defensive coordinator: Tom Bradley (1st season)
- Base defense: 4–3
- Home stadium: Rose Bowl

Uniform
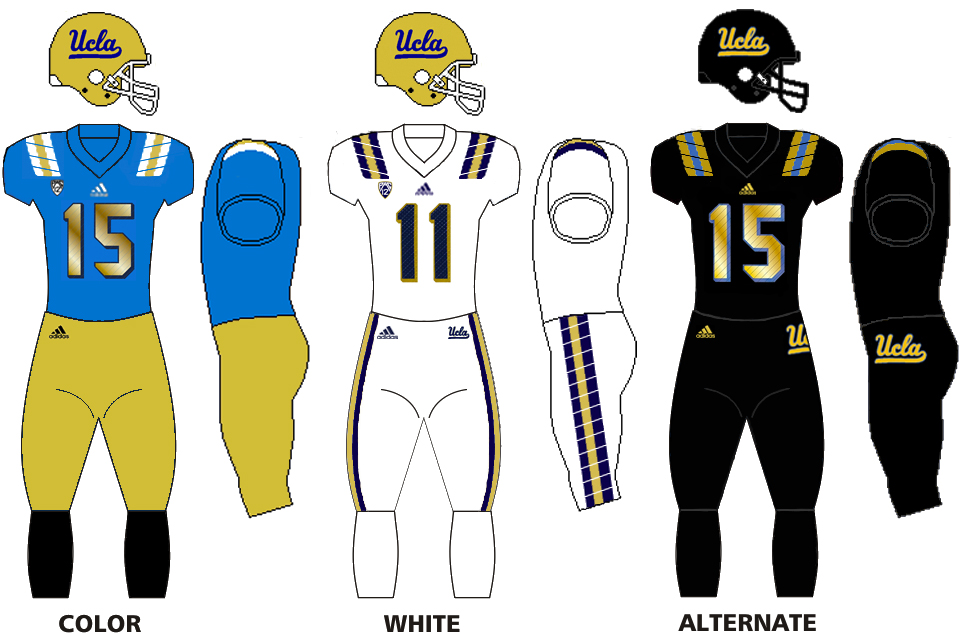

2015 Pac-12 Conference football standings
	Conf.			Overall
Team	W		L	W		L
North Division
No. 3 Stanford xy$	8	–	1	12	–	2
No. 19 Oregon	7	–	2	9	–	4
Washington State	6	–	3	9	–	4
California	4	–	5	8	–	5
Washington	4	–	5	7	–	6
Oregon State	0	–	9	2	–	10
South Division
USC xy	6	–	3	8	–	6
No. 17 Utah x	6	–	3	10	–	3
UCLA	5	–	4	8	–	5
Arizona State	4	–	5	6	–	7
Arizona	3	–	6	7	–	6
Colorado	1	–	8	4	–	9
Championship: Stanford 41, USC 22
$ – Conference champion; x – Division champion/co-champions; y – Championship game participant; Rankings from AP Poll

The 2015 UCLA Bruins football team represented the University of California, Los Angeles in the 2015 NCAA Division I FBS football season. The Bruins were coached by fourth-year head coach Jim Mora and played their home games at the Rose Bowl in Pasadena, California. They were members of the South Division of the Pac-12 Conference. The Bruins finished the season 8–5, including 5–4 in conference play to finish third in the South Division, and outscored their opponents by a combined total of 419 to 338.

== Preseason ==
=== Recruiting ===
College recruiting
Name	Hometown	School	Height	Weight	40^{‡}	Commit date
Zach Bateman; OL	Costa Mesa, CA	Orange Coast College	6 ft 7 in (2.01 m)	320 lb (150 kg)	N/A	Nov 16, 2014
Zach Bateman; OL	Recruit ratings: Scout: Rivals: 247Sports: ESPN:					
Cordell Broadus; WR	Las Vegas, NV	Bishop Gorman HS	6 ft 3 in (1.91 m)	186 lb (84 kg)	N/A	Feb 4, 2015
Cordell Broadus; WR	Recruit ratings: Scout: Rivals: 247Sports: ESPN:					
Chris Clark; TE	Avon, CT	Avon Old Farms	6 ft 5 in (1.96 m)	253 lb (115 kg)	4.7	Feb 4, 2015
Chris Clark; TE	Recruit ratings: Scout: Rivals: 247Sports: ESPN:					
Tevita Halalilo; OL	Moreno Valley, CA	Rancho Verde HS	6 ft 4 in (1.93 m)	315 lb (143 kg)	N/A	Jan 9, 2015
Tevita Halalilo; OL	Recruit ratings: Scout: Rivals: 247Sports: ESPN:					
Dechaun Holiday; ATH	San Marcos, CA	Mission Hills HS	6 ft 2 in (1.88 m)	207 lb (94 kg)	N/A	Feb 1, 2015
Dechaun Holiday; ATH	Recruit ratings: Scout: Rivals: 247Sports: ESPN:					
Soso Jamabo; RB	Plano, TX	Plano West Senior HS	6 ft 2 in (1.88 m)	201 lb (91 kg)	4.61	Feb 4, 2015
Soso Jamabo; RB	Recruit ratings: Scout: Rivals: 247Sports: ESPN:					
Andre James; OL	Herriman, UT	Herriman HS	6 ft 5 in (1.96 m)	275 lb (125 kg)	5.34	Jul 10, 2014
Andre James; OL	Recruit ratings: Scout: Rivals: 247Sports: ESPN:					
Stephen Johnson; ATH	San Leandro, CA	San Leandro HS	5 ft 11 in (1.80 m)	188 lb (85 kg)	4.37	Jul 8, 2014
Stephen Johnson; ATH	Recruit ratings: Scout: Rivals: 247Sports: ESPN:					
William Lockett; DB	Manvel, TX	Manvel HS	5 ft 11 in (1.80 m)	185 lb (84 kg)	N/A	Aug 7, 2014
William Lockett; DB	Recruit ratings: Scout: Rivals: 247Sports: ESPN:					
Keisean Lucier-South; DE	Orange, CA	Lutheran HS - Orange County	6 ft 6 in (1.98 m)	220 lb (100 kg)	4.81	Nov 22, 2014
Keisean Lucier-South; DE	Recruit ratings: Scout: Rivals: 247Sports: ESPN:					
Nate Meadors; DB	San Bernardino, CA	San Gorgonio HS	6 ft 1 in (1.85 m)	186 lb (84 kg)	N/A	Feb 4, 2015
Nate Meadors; DB	Recruit ratings: Scout: Rivals: 247Sports: ESPN:					
Bolu Olorunfunmi; RB	Fresno, CA	Clovis North HS	5 ft 10 in (1.78 m)	216 lb (98 kg)	N/A	Mar 11, 2014
Bolu Olorunfunmi; RB	Recruit ratings: Scout: Rivals: 247Sports: ESPN:					
Josh Rosen; QB	Bellflower, CA	St. John Bosco HS	6 ft 4 in (1.93 m)	207 lb (94 kg)	4.99	Mar 20, 2014
Josh Rosen; QB	Recruit ratings: Scout: Rivals: 247Sports: ESPN:					
Colin Samuel; DB	Long Beach, CA	Long Beach Poly	6 ft 2 in (1.88 m)	180 lb (82 kg)	N/A	Dec 9, 2014
Colin Samuel; DB	Recruit ratings: Scout: Rivals: 247Sports: ESPN:					
Octavius Spencer; DB	Monrovia, CA	Monrovia HS	5 ft 11 in (1.80 m)	175 lb (79 kg)	4.6	Dec 16, 2014
Octavius Spencer; DB	Recruit ratings: Scout: Rivals: 247Sports: ESPN:					
Fred Ulu-Perry; OL	Honolulu, HI	Saint Louis School	6 ft 2 in (1.88 m)	310 lb (140 kg)	N/A	Jul 11, 2014
Fred Ulu-Perry; OL	Recruit ratings: Scout: Rivals: 247Sports: ESPN:					
Rick Wade; DE	Rancho Santa Margarita, CA	Santa Margarita Catholic HS	6 ft 6 in (1.98 m)	230 lb (100 kg)	N/A	Jul 31, 2014
Rick Wade; DE	Recruit ratings: Scout: Rivals: 247Sports: ESPN:					
Josh Wariboko; OL	Oklahoma City, OK	Casady School	6 ft 3 in (1.91 m)	314 lb (142 kg)	N/A	Feb 4, 2015
Josh Wariboko; OL	Recruit ratings: Scout: Rivals: 247Sports: ESPN:					
Joshua Woods; LB	Upland, CA	Upland HS	6 ft 3 in (1.91 m)	210 lb (95 kg)	N/A	Jul 29, 2014
Joshua Woods; LB	Recruit ratings: Scout: Rivals: 247Sports: ESPN:					
Overall recruit ranking: Scout: 9 Rivals: 13 247Sports: 14 ESPN: 11
Note: In many cases, Scout, Rivals, 247Sports, On3, and ESPN may conflict in their listings of height and weight.; In these cases, the average was taken. ESPN grades are on a 100-point scale.; Sources: "2015 Team Ranking". Rivals.com.

== Roster ==
2015 UCLA Bruins roster
Offense Receivers: 2 Jordan Lasley – (redshirt) Freshman; 4 Darren Andrews – (redshirt) Sophomore; 6 Stephen Johnson III – Freshman; 7 Devin Fuller – Senior; 9 Jordan Payton – Senior; 10 Aaron Sharp – (redshirt) Freshman; 10 Kenneth Walker III – (redshirt) Junior; 14 Mossi Johnson – Sophomore; 18 Thomas Duarte – Junior; 19 Craig Myers – (redshirt) Freshman; 27 Christian Pabico – (redshirt) Freshman; 29 Brad Sochowski – (redshirt) Freshman; 81 Tyler Scott – (redshirt) Senior; 82 Eldridge Massington – (redshirt) Sophomore; 83 Alex Van Dyke – Sophomore; 85 Colby Cyburt – (redshirt) Junior; 86 Logan Sweet – (redshirt) Senior; 87 Chris Clark – Freshman; 87 Daniel Fields – (redshirt) Sophomore; 88 Austin Roberts – (redshirt) Freshman; 89 Zack Bornstein – (redshirt) Freshman; Offensive linemen: 51 Alex Redmond – Junior; 52 Scott Quessenberry – Junior; 54 Jake Brendel – (redshirt) Senior; 55 Giovanni Gentosi – (redshirt) Freshman; 56 Josh Wariboko-Alali – Freshman; 59 Zack Bateman – Junior; 60 Jesus Moreno – (redshirt) Freshman; 63 Jake Tourville – (redshirt) Freshman; 64 Fred Ulu-Perry – Freshman; 68 Conor McDermott – (redshirt) Junior; 70 Simon Goines – (redshirt) Junior; 71 Poasi Moala – (redshirt) Sophomore; 72 Christian Garcia – (redshirt) Junior; 73 Tevita Halalilo – Freshman; 74 Caleb Benenoch – Junior; 75 Andre James – Freshman; 76 Kenny Lacy – (redshirt) Sophomore; 77 Kolton Miller – (redshirt) Freshman; 78 John Lopez – (redshirt) Sophomore; Quarterbacks: 3 Josh Rosen – Freshman; 10 Jake Hall – (redshirt) Junior; 11 Jerry Neuheisel – (redshirt) Junior; 12 Mike Fafaul – (redshirt) Junior	Fullbacks: 32 Nate Iese – (redshirt) Junior; 28 Taylor Lagace – (redshirt) Junior; Running backs: 1 Soso Jamabo – Freshman; 20 Bolu Olorunfunmi – Freshman; 21 Craig Lee – (redshirt) Sophomore; 22 Roosevelt Davis – (redshirt) Senior; 23 Nate Starks – Sophomore; 24 Paul Perkins – (redshirt) Junior; 33 Steven Manfro – (redshirt) Senior; 35 Ryan Davis – (redshirt) Junior; Defense Defensive linemen: 35 Ainuu Taua – (redshirt) Freshman; 47 Eddie Vanderdoes – Junior; 57 Carl Hulick – (redshirt) Junior; 72 Jake Jones – (redshirt) Junior; 76 Alex Rassool – (redshirt) Freshman; 77 Taylor Prenovost – (redshirt) Freshman; 78 Justin Rittman – (redshirt) Freshman; 89 Thomas Schwab – (redshirt) Sophomore; 90 Rick Wade – Freshman; 91 Jacob Tuioti-Mariner – Sophomore; 94 Najee Toran – (redshirt) Freshman; 96 Eli Ankou – (redshirt) Junior; 97 Kenny Clark – Junior; 98 Takkarist McKinley – Junior; 99 Matt Dickerson – Sophomore; Linebackers: 4 Cameron Judge – Junior; 11 Keisean Lucier-South – Freshman; 12 Jayon Brown – Junior; 19 Josh Woods – Freshman; 30 Myles Jack – Junior; 37 Dwight Williams – (redshirt) Freshman; 40 Cameron Griffin – (redshirt) Freshman; 42 Kenny Young – Sophomore; 43 Willie Green – (redshirt) Junior; 44 Issako Savaiinaea – Junior; 45 Jack Savage – Freshman; 46 Kene Orjioke – (redshirt) Junior; 51 Aaron Wallace Jr. – (redshirt) Senior; 55 Sean Burd – (redshirt) Senior; 58 Deon Hollins – Junior	Defensive backs: 1 Ishmael Adams – (redshirt) Junior; 2 Jaleel Wadood – Sophomore; 3 Randall Goforth – (redshirt) Junior; 6 Adarius Pickett – (redshirt) Freshman; 7 John Johnson – (redshirt) Sophomore; 9 Marcus Rios – (redshirt) Junior; 10 Fabian Moreau – Senior; 14 Octavius Spencer – Freshman; 17 DeChaun Holiday – Freshman; 20 Justin Combs – (redshirt) Junior; 21 Tahaan Goodman – Junior; 22 Nate Meadors – Freshman; 23 Will Lockett – Freshman; 24 Charles Dawson – Junior; 25 Denzel Fisher – (redshirt) Freshman; 27 Alex Staff – (redshirt) Sophomore; 31 Colin Samuel – Freshman; 33 Dylan Luther – (redshirt) Sophomore; 39 Michael Carlson – (redshirt) Sophomore; Special teams Punters/Kickers: 15 Kaʻimi Fairbairn – Senior PK/KO; 20 Stefan Flintoft – (redshirt) Freshman PK / P; 39 Adam Searl – Junior P; 46 Matt Mengel – Senior KO/P; Long snappers: 59 Christopher Longo – (redshirt) Senior; Punt Returners/Kickoff Returners: 1 Ishmael Adams – (redshirt) Junior PR/KR; 2 Jaleel Wadood – Sophomore KR; 3 Randall Goforth – (redshirt) Junior PR; 4 Darren Andrews – (redshirt) Sophomore PR/KR; 7 Devin Fuller – Senior PR/KR; 10 Kenneth Walker – (redshirt) Junior KR; 14 Mossi Johnson – Sophomore KR; 22 Roosevelt Davis – (redshirt) Senior KR; 33 Steven Manfro – (redshirt) Senior KR
Source: UCLA Bruins Football 2015 Media Guide

On August 14, 2015, UCLA announced that freshman wide receiver Cordell Broadus had left the UCLA football team, "[deciding] to pursue other passions in his life."

== Schedule ==
Date	Time	Opponent	Rank	Site	TV	Result	Attendance
September 5, 2015	12:30 pm	Virginia*	No. 13	Rose Bowl; Pasadena, CA	FOX	W 34–16	68,615
September 12, 2015	7:30 pm	at UNLV*	No. 13	Sam Boyd Stadium; Whitney, NV	CBSSN	W 37–3	31,262
September 19, 2015	7:30 pm	No. 19 BYU*	No. 10	Rose Bowl; Pasadena, CA	FS1	W 24–23	67,612
September 26, 2015	5:00 pm	at No. 16 Arizona	No. 9	Arizona Stadium; Tucson, AZ (College GameDay)	ABC	W 56–30	56,004
October 3, 2015	4:30 pm	Arizona State	No. 7	Rose Bowl; Pasadena, CA	FOX	L 23–38	80,113
October 15, 2015	7:30 pm	at No. 15 Stanford	No. 18	Stanford Stadium; Stanford, CA (rivalry)	ESPN	L 35–56	50,464
October 22, 2015	6:00 pm	No. 20 California		Rose Bowl; Pasadena, CA (rivalry)	ESPN	W 40–24	57,046
October 31, 2015	12:00 p.m.	Colorado^{†}	No. 24	Rose Bowl; Pasadena, CA	P12N	W 35–31	51,508
November 7, 2015	1:30 p.m.	at Oregon State	No. 23	Reser Stadium; Corvallis, OR	P12N	W 41–0	38,074
November 14, 2015	7:45 p.m.	Washington State	No. 19	Rose Bowl; Pasadena, CA	ESPN	L 27–31	76,255
November 21, 2015	12:30 p.m.	at No. 13 Utah		Rice-Eccles Stadium; Salt Lake City, UT	FOX	W 17–9	46,230
November 28, 2015	12:30 p.m.	at USC	No. 22	Los Angeles Memorial Coliseum; Los Angeles, CA (Victory Bell/rivalry)	ABC/ESPN2	L 21–40	83,602
December 26, 2015	6:15 p.m.	vs. Nebraska*		Levi's Stadium; Santa Clara, CA (Foster Farms Bowl)	ESPN	L 29–37	33,527
*Non-conference game; ^{†}Homecoming; Rankings from AP Poll and CFP Rankings after November 3 released prior to game; All times are in Pacific time

== Game summaries ==
=== Virginia ===
Virginia Cavaliers vs #13 UCLA Bruins – Game summary

Quarter	1	2	3	4	Total
Virginia	3	6	0	7	16
#13 UCLA	7	10	14	3	34

at Rose Bowl, Pasadena, CA

- Date: September 5, 2015
- Game attendance: 68,615
- TV announcers (FOX): Joe Davis (Play-by-play), Brady Quinn (Color) & Kris Budden (Sideline)

Game information

First quarter

- UVA - Ian Frye 42-yard field goal
- UCLA - Devin Fuller 4-yard pass from Josh Rosen (Kaʻimi Fairbairn kick)

Second quarter

- UVA - Frye 31-yard field goal
- UCLA - Thomas Duarte 30-yard pass from Rosen (Fairbairn kick)
- UVA - Frye 19-yard field goal
- UCLA - Fairbairn 26-yard field goal

Third quarter

- UCLA - Myles Jack 1-yard run (Fairbairn kick)
- UCLA - Kenny Clark 3-yard pass from Rosen (Fairbairn kick)

Fourth quarter

- UCLA - Fairbairn 21-yard field goal
- UVA - Taquan Mizzell 19-yard pass from Matt Johns (Frye kick)

Top passers

- UCLA - Josh Rosen 28/35, 351 Yds, 3 TDs
- UVA - Matt Johns, 21/35, 238 Yds, 1 TD, 1 INT

Top rushers

- UCLA - Soso Jamabo, 9 carries, 79 Yds
- UVA - Taquan Mizzell, 16 carries, 45 Yds

Top receivers

- UCLA - Paul Perkins, 5 receptions, 58 Yds
- UVA - Taquan Mizzell, 8 receptions, 100 Yds, 1 TD

Top tacklers

- UCLA - Eddie Vanderdoes, 6 tackles
- UVA - Micah Kiser, 10 tackles

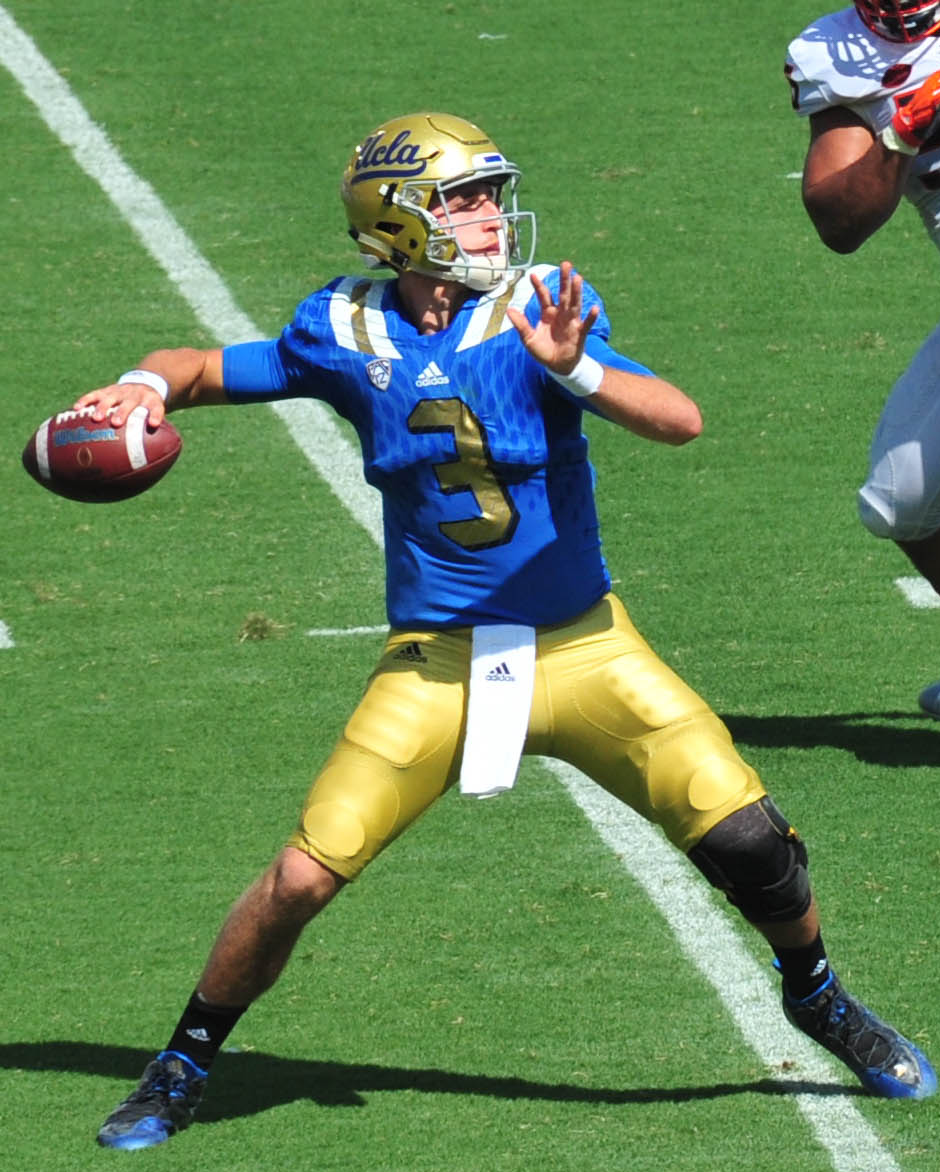
Josh Rosen started at quarterback as a true freshman

UCLA freshman quarterback Josh Rosen completed 28 of 35 passes for 351 yards and three touchdowns in a 34–16 win over Virginia. The No. 13 Bruins gained 503 yard in total offense as Rosen completed passes to 11 different receivers. UCLA did not allow a touchdown until the final minutes of the game.

The nation's top quarterback recruit, Rosen was taking over for three-year starter Brett Hundley, who had left for the National Football League (NFL). On the first play, the freshman threw a perfect 55-yard pass to Kenneth Walker III, who dropped the pass. The drive stalled, but Rosen completed seven consecutive passes at the end of the quarter, including a scoring pass to Devin Fuller. In the middle of the second quarter, Rosen connected with Thomas Duarte on a 30-yard pass placed over the defender's shoulder and into his receiver's hands. Two defenders playing on offense scored for UCLA in the third. Linebacker Myles Jack, who also spends some time at running back, scored on a run, and defensive tackle Kenny Clark caught a scoring pass late in the quarter. Virginia, who had been limited to three field goals, scored their only touchdown with 3:29 left in the game.

The Cavaliers had been selected to finish last among seven teams in the Atlantic Coast Conference's Coastal Division, and lost six of seven games dating back to the previous season. Rosen was honored as the Walter Camp Offensive Player of the Week.

=== UNLV ===
#13 UCLA Bruins vs UNLV Rebels – Game summary

Quarter	1	2	3	4	Total
#13 UCLA	10	7	17	3	37
UNLV	0	0	0	3	3

at Sam Boyd Stadium, Whitney, NV

- Date: September 12, 2015
- Game attendance: 31,262
- TV announcers (CBSSN): Carter Blackburn (Play-by-play), Aaron Taylor (Color) & Jenny Dell (Sideline)

Game information

First quarter

- UCLA - Jordan Payton 29-yard pass from Josh Rosen (Kaʻimi Fairbairn kick)
- UCLA - Fairbairn 35-yard field goal

Second quarter

- UCLA - Kenny Young return for 23-yard interception of Kurt Palandech pass (Fairbairn kick)

Third quarter

- UCLA - Paul Perkins 7-yard run (Fairbairn kick)
- UCLA - Perkins 56-yard run (Fairbairn kick)
- UCLA - Fairbairn 34-yard field goal

Fourth quarter

- UCLA - Fairbairn 42-yard field goal
- UNLV - Nicolai Bornand 32-yard field goal

Top passers

- UCLA - Josh Rosen, 22/42, 223 Yds, 1 TD, 1 INT
- UNLV - Blake Decker, 2/6, 52 Yds

Top rushers

- UCLA - Paul Perkins, 18 carries, 151 Yds, 2 TD
- UNLV - Keith Whitely, 12 carries, 73 Yds

Top receivers

- UCLA - Jordan Payton, 5 receptions, 70 Yds, 1 TD
- UNLV - Devonte Boyd, 3 receptions, 55 Yds

Top tacklers

- UCLA - Eli Ankou, 5 tackles
- UNLV - Peni Vea, 8 tackles

=== BYU ===
#19 BYU Cougars vs #10 UCLA Bruins – Game summary

Quarter	1	2	3	4	Total
BYU	7	3	7	6	23
#10 UCLA	0	3	7	14	24

at Rose Bowl, Pasadena, CA

- Date: September 19, 2015
- Game attendance: 67,612
- TV announcers (FS1): Joe Davis (Play-by-play), Brady Quinn (Color) & Kris Budden (Sideline)

Game information

First quarter

- BYU - Adam Hine 7-yard run (Trevor Samson kick)

Second quarter

- UCLA - Kaʻimi Fairbairn 26-yard field goal
- BYU - Samson 40-yard field goal

Third quarter

- UCLA - Paul Perkins 5-yard run (Fairbairn kick)
- BYU - Mitch Matthews 14-yard pass from Tanner Mangum (Samson kick)

Fourth quarter

- BYU - Samson 45-yard field goal
- UCLA - Jordan Payton 19-yard pass from Josh Rosen (Fairbairn kick)
- BYU - Samson 32-yard field goal
- UCLA - Nate Starks 3-yard run (Fairbairn kick)

Top passers

- UCLA - Josh Rosen 11/23, 106 Yds, 1 TD, 3 INT
- BYU - Tanner Mangum, 30/47, 244 Yds, 1 TD, 1 INT

Top rushers

- UCLA - Paul Perkins, 26 carries, 219 Yds, 1 TD
- BYU - Adam Hine, 23 carries, 149 Yds, 1 TD

Top receivers

- UCLA - Jordan Payton, 4 receptions, 59 Yds, 1 TD
- BYU - Mitch Matthews, 9 receptions, 84 Yds, 1 TD

Top tacklers

- UCLA - Isaako Savaiinaea, 14 tackles
- BYU - Harvey Langi, 8 tackles

=== #16 Arizona ===
#9 UCLA Bruins vs #16 Arizona Wildcats – Game summary

Quarter	1	2	3	4	Total
#9 UCLA	14	28	7	7	56
#16 Arizona	7	7	9	7	30

at Arizona Stadium, Tucson, AZ

- Date: September 26, 2015
- Game attendance: 56,004
- Referee: Mark Duddy
- TV announcers (ABC): Chris Fowler (Play-by-play), Kirk Herbstreit (Color) & Heather Cox (Sideline)

Game information

First quarter

- ARIZ - Nate Phillips 34-yard pass from Anu Solomon (Casey Skowron kick)
- UCLA - Thomas Duarte 35-yard pass from Josh Rosen (Kaʻimi Fairbairn kick)
- UCLA - Paul Perkins 16-yard run (Fairbairn kick)

Second quarter

- UCLA - Perkins 1-yard run (Fairbairn kick)
- UCLA - Jordan Payton 5-yard pass from Rosen (Fairbairn kick)
- ARIZ - Jerrard Randall 39-yard run (Skowron kick)
- UCLA - Nate Starks 3-yard run (Fairbairn kick)
- UCLA - Perkins 1-yard run (Fairbairn kick)

Third quarter

- ARIZ - David Richards 16-yard pass from Randall (Skowron kick missed)
- ARIZ - Skowron 44-yard field goal
- UCLA - Rosen 8-yard run (Fairbairn kick)

Fourth quarter

- UCLA - Soso Jamabo 10-yard run (Fairbairn kick)
- ARIZ - Jared Baker 2-yard run (Skowron kick)

Top passers

- UCLA - Josh Rosen 19/28, 284 Yds, 2 TD
- ARIZ - Anu Solomon, 4/10, 55 Yds, 1 TD

Top rushers

- UCLA - Soso Jamabo, 9 carries, 96 Yds, 1 TD
- ARIZ - Nick Wilson, 24 carries, 136 Yds

Top receivers

- UCLA - Jordan Payton, 7 receptions, 136 Yds, 1 TD
- ARIZ - Cayleb Jones, 4 receptions, 44 Yds

Top tacklers

- UCLA - Tahaan Goodman, 10 tackles
- ARIZ - Will Parks, 7 tackles

=== Arizona State ===
Arizona State vs #7 UCLA Bruins – Game summary

Quarter	1	2	3	4	Total
Arizona State	9	6	14	9	38
#7 UCLA	0	10	0	13	23

at Rose Bowl, Pasadena, CA

- Date: October 3, 2015
- Game attendance: 80,113
- Referee: Steve Strimling
- TV announcers (FOX): Gus Johnson (Play-by-play), Joel Klatt (Color) & Molly McGrath (Sideline)

Game information

First quarter

- ASU - Team Safety
- ASU - Tim White 12-yard pass from Mike Bercovici (Zane Gonzalez kick)

Second quarter

- UCLA - Thomas Duarte 13-yard pass from Josh Rosen (Kaʻimi Fairbairn kick)
- ASU - Gonzalez 31-yard field goal
- ASU - Gonzalez 25-yard field goal
- UCLA - Fairbairn 53-yard field goal

Third quarter

- ASU - Bercovici 34-yard run (Gonzalez kick)
- ASU - D. J. Foster 11-yard pass from Bercovici (Gonzalez kick)

Fourth quarter

- UCLA - Paul Perkins 1-yard run (Fairbairn kick)
- UCLA - Duarte 17-yard pass from Rosen (Fairbairn kick)
- ASU - Team Safety
- ASU - Kalen Ballage 23-yard run (Gonzalez kick)

Top passers

- UCLA - Josh Rosen 22/40, 280 Yds, 2 TD, 1 INT
- ASU - Mike Bercovici, 27/44, 273 Yds, 2 TD, 1 INT

Top rushers

- UCLA - Paul Perkins, 18 carries, 63 Yds, 1 TD
- ASU - Demario Richard, 23 carries, 79 Yds

Top receivers

- UCLA - Thomas Duarte, 6 receptions, 101 Yds, 2 TD
- ASU - D. J. Foster, 4 receptions, 57 Yds, 1 TD

Top tacklers

- UCLA - Isaako Savaiinaea, 15 tackles
- ASU - Salamo Fiso, 8 tackles

=== #15 Stanford ===
#18 UCLA Bruins vs #15 Stanford Cardinal – Game summary

Quarter	1	2	3	4	Total
#18 UCLA	10	7	3	15	35
#15 Stanford	14	21	21	0	56

at Stanford Stadium, Stanford, CA

- Date: October 15, 2015
- Game attendance: 50,464
- Referee: Michael Mothers
- TV announcers (ESPN): Joe Tessitore (Play-by-play), Jesse Palmer, David Pollack (Color) & Kaylee Hartung (Sideline)

Game information

First quarter

- STAN - Alijah Holder 31-yard interception return (Conrad Ukropina kick)
- UCLA - Kaʻimi Fairbairn 36-yard field goal
- STAN - Austin Hooper 4-yard pass from Kevin Hogan (Ukropina kick)
- UCLA - Darren Andrews 70-yard pass from Josh Rosen (Fairbairn kick)

Second quarter

- STAN - Devon Cajuste 9-yard pass from Hogan (Ukropina kick)
- STAN - Christian McCaffrey 9-yard run (Ukropina kick)
- STAN - McCaffrey 28-yard run (Ukropina kick)
- UCLA - Paul Perkins 3-yard run (Fairbairn kick)

Third quarter

- STAN - Francis Owusu 41-yard pass from Hogan (Ukropina kick)
- UCLA - Fairbairn 36-yard field goal
- STAN - McCaffrey 70-yard run (Ukropina kick)
- STAN - McCaffrey 6-yard run (Ukropina kick)

Fourth quarter

- UCLA - Thomas Duarte 38-yard pass from Rosen (Rosen pass to Nate Starks for two-point conversion)
- UCLA - Jordan Payton 18-yard pass from Rosen (Fairbairn kick)

Top passers

- UCLA - Josh Rosen 22/42, 325 Yds, 3 TD, 2 INT
- STAN - Kevin Hogan 8-15, 131 Yds, 3 TD, 1 INT

Top rushers

- UCLA - Paul Perkins, 14 carries, 104 Yds, 1 TD
- STAN - Christian McCaffrey, 25 carries, 243 Yds, 4 TD

Top receivers

- UCLA - Darren Andrews, 4 receptions, 100 Yds, 1 TD
- STAN - Austin Hooper, 3 receptions, 42 Yds, 1 TD

Top tacklers

- UCLA - Kenny Young, 13 tackles
- STAN - Blake Martinez, 7 tackles

=== #20 California ===
#20 California Golden Bears vs UCLA Bruins – Game summary

Quarter	1	2	3	4	Total
#20 California	3	7	6	8	24
UCLA	10	16	14	0	40

at Rose Bowl, Pasadena, CA

- Date: October 22, 2015
- Game weather: Partly cloudy
- Game attendance: 57,046
- Referee: Terry Leyden
- TV announcers (ESPN): Joe Tessitore (Play-by-play), Jesse Palmer, David Pollack (Color) & Kaylee Hartung (Sideline)

Game information

First quarter

- CAL - Matt Anderson 26-yard Field Goal
- UCLA - Kaʻimi Fairbairn 44-yard Field Goal
- UCLA - Thomas Duarte 7-yard pass from Josh Rosen (Kaʻimi Fairbairn kick)

Second quarter

- UCLA - Devin Fuller 19-yard pass from Josh Rosen (Fairbairn kick)
- UCLA - Kaʻimi Fairbairn 24-yard Field Goal
- UCLA - Kaʻimi Fairbairn 20-yard Field Goal
- CAL - Kenny Lawler 1-yard pass from Jared Goff (Matt Anderson Kick)
- UCLA - Kaʻimi Fairbairn 60-yard Field Goal

Third quarter

- UCLA - Devin Fuller 21-yard pass from Josh Rosen (Fairbairn kick)
- CAL - Darius Powe 1-yard pass from Jared Goff (Two-Point Pass Conversion failed)
- UCLA - Soso Jamabo 1-yard Run (Fairbairn kick)

Fourth quarter

- CAL - Khalfani Muhammad 18-yard pass from Jared Goff (Goff Run For Two-Point Conversion)

Top passers

- CAL - Jared Goff, 32/53, 295 Yds, 3 TDs
- UCLA - Josh Rosen, 34/47, 399 Yds, 3 TDs

Top rushers

- CAL - Khalfani Muhammad, 8 carries, 55 Yds
- UCLA - Soso Jamabo, 18 carries, 79 Yds, 1 TD

Top receivers

- CAL - Maurice Harris, 4 receptions, 63 Yds
- UCLA - Thomas Duarte, 10 receptions, 141 Yds, 1 TD

Top tacklers

- CAL - Damariay Drew, 10 tackles
- UCLA - Randall Goforth, 7 tackles

=== Colorado ===
Colorado Buffaloes vs #24 UCLA Bruins – Game summary

Quarter	1	2	3	4	Total
Colorado	0	6	10	15	31
#24 UCLA	7	14	7	7	35

at Rose Bowl, Pasadena, CA

- Date: October 31, 2015
- Game weather: Clear and sunny
- Game attendance: 51,508
- Referee: Chris Coyte
- TV announcers (P12N): Roxy Bernstein (Play-by-play), Glenn Parker (Color) & Jill Savage (Sideline)

Game information

First quarter

- UCLA - Paul Perkins 31-yard pass from Josh Rosen (Kaʻimi Fairbairn kick)

Second quarter

- UCLA - Ishmael Adams 96-yard interception return (Fairbairn kick)
- COL - Diego Gonzalez 25-yard field goal
- UCLA - Perkins 82-yard run (Fairbairn kick)
- COL - Gonzalez 23-yard field goal

Third quarter

- COL - Donovan Lee 1-yard run (Gonzalez kick)
- UCLA - Nate Starks 11-yard run (Fairbairn kick)
- COL - Gonzalez 45-yard field goal

Fourth quarter

- COL - Samson Kafovalu 33-yard fumble return (Gonzalez kick)
- COL - Patrick Carr 6-yard run (Sefo Liufau pass to Nelson Spruce)
- UCLA - Soso Jamabo 2-yard run (Fairbairn kick)

Top passers

- COL - Sefo Liufau, 37/57, 312 Yds, 2 INT
- UCLA - Josh Rosen 19/33, 262 Yds, 1 TD

Top rushers

- COL - Patrick Carr, 19 carries, 100 Yds, 1 TD
- UCLA - Paul Perkins, 12 carries, 118 Yds, 1 TD

Top receivers

- COL - Devin Ross, 9 receptions, 101 Yds
- UCLA - Jordan Payton, 8 receptions, 134 Yds

Top tacklers

- COL - Tedric Thompson, 9 tackles
- UCLA - Jayon Brown, 18 tackles

=== Oregon State ===
#22 UCLA Bruins vs Oregon State – Game summary

Quarter	1	2	3	4	Total
#22 UCLA	0	24	17	0	41
Oregon State	0	0	0	0	0

at Reser Stadium, Corvallis, OR

- Date: November 7, 2015
- Game weather: Raining
- Game attendance: 38,074
- Referee: Michael Batlan
- TV announcers (P12N): Kevin Calabro (Play-by-play), Yogi Roth (Color) & Lewis Johnson (Sideline)

Game information

Second quarter

- UCLA - Kaʻimi Fairbairn 38-yard field goal
- UCLA - Thomas Duarte 8-yard pass from Josh Rosen (Fairbairn kick)
- UCLA - Duarte 10-yard pass from Rosen (Fairbairn kick)
- UCLA - Paul Perkins 7-yard run (Fairbairn kick)

Third quarter

- UCLA - Nate Starks 11-yard run (Fairbairn kick)
- UCLA - Fairbairn 29-yard field goal
- UCLA - Soso Jamabo 30-yard run (Fairbairn kick)

Top passers

- UCLA - Josh Rosen 22/33, 333 Yds, 2 TDs
- OSU - Nick Mitchell, 9/19, 84 Yds, 3 INTs

Top rushers

- UCLA - Soso Jamabo, 9 carries, 90 Yds, 1 TD
- OSU - Storm Barrs-Woods, 14 carries, 87 Yds

Top receivers

- UCLA - Thomas Duarte, 6 receptions, 116 Yds, 2 TDs
- OSU - Hunter Jarmon, 2 receptions, 57 Yds

Top tacklers

- UCLA - Jayon Brown, 10 tackles
- OSU - Devin Chappell, 11 tackles

=== Washington State ===
Washington State Cougars vs #18 UCLA Bruins – Game summary

Quarter	1	2	3	4	Total
Washington State	7	7	7	10	31
#18 UCLA	6	10	0	11	27

at Rose Bowl, Pasadena, CA

- Date: November 14, 2015
- Game time: 7:52 pm
- Game weather: Clear
- Game attendance: 76,255
- Referee: Terry Leyden
- TV announcers (ESPN): Dave Pasch (Play-by-play), Brian Griese (Color) & Tom Luginbill (Sideline)

Game information

First quarter

- UCLA - Kaʻimi Fairbairn 22-yard field goal
- WSU - Gerard Wicks 2-yard run (Erik Powell kick)
- UCLA - Fairbairn 22-yard field goal

Second quarter

- UCLA - Nate Starks 14-yard run (Fairbairn kick)
- WSU - Dom Williams 7-yard pass from Peyton Bender (Powell kick)
- UCLA - Fairbairn 38-yard field goal

Third quarter

- WSU - Gabe Marks 4-yard pass from Luke Falk (Powell kick)

Fourth quarter

- WSU - Powell 25-yard field goal
- UCLA - Fairbairn 38-yard field goal
- UCLA - Josh Rosen 37-yard run (Rosen pass to Thomas Duarte)
- WSU - Marks 21-yard pass from Falk (Powell kick)

Top passers

- WSU - Luke Falk, 38/53, 331 Yds, 2 TD, 1 INT
- UCLA - Josh Rosen, 33/57, 340 Yds

Top rushers

- WSU - Jamal Morrow, 5 carries, 32 Yds
- UCLA - Paul Perkins, 20 carries, 121 Yds

Top receivers

- WSU - Dom Williams, 7 receptions, 100 Yds, 1 TD
- UCLA - Jordan Payton, 14 receptions, 152 Yds

Top tacklers

- WSU - Peyton Pelluer, 8 tackles
- UCLA - Randall Goforth, 9 tackles

=== #18 Utah ===
UCLA Bruins vs #18 Utah Utes – Game summary

Quarter	1	2	3	4	Total
UCLA	10	0	7	0	17
#18 Utah	0	6	3	0	9

at Rice-Eccles Stadium, Salt Lake City, UT

- Date: November 21, 2015
- Game time: 1:35 pm
- Game weather: 43 °F (6 °C), sunny
- Game attendance: 46,230
- Referee: Mark Duddy
- TV announcers (FOX): Joe Davis (Play-by-play), Brady Quinn (Color) & Kris Budden (Sideline)

Game information

First quarter

- UCLA - Thomas Duarte 28-yard pass from Josh Rosen (Fairbairn kick)
- UCLA - Kaʻimi Fairbairn 33-yard field goal

Second quarter

- UTAH - Andy Phillips 39-yard field goal
- UTAH - Andy Phillips 39-yard field goal

Third quarter

- UTAH - Andy Phillips 21-yard field goal
- UCLA - Paul Perkins 2-yard run (Fairbairn kick)

Top passers

- UCLA - Josh Rosen, 15/30, 220 Yds, 1 TD
- UTAH - Travis Wilson, 13/26, 110 Yds

Top rushers

- UCLA - Paul Perkins, 28 carries, 112 Yds, 1 TD
- UTAH - Joe Williams, 26 carries, 128 Yds; Travis Wilson, 18 carries, 89 Yds

Top receivers

- UCLA - Jordan Payton, 7 receptions, 105 Yds; Thomas Duarte, 2 receptions, 61 Yds, 1 TD
- UTAH - Joe Williams, 4 receptions, 31 Yds; Harris Handley, 3 receptions, 32 Yds

Top tacklers

- UCLA - Javon Brown, 10 tackles
- UTAH - Jared Norris, 11 tackles

=== USC ===
#22 UCLA Bruins vs USC Trojans – Game summary

Quarter	1	2	3	4	Total
#22 UCLA	7	7	7	0	21
USC	3	17	13	7	40

at Los Angeles Memorial Coliseum, Los Angeles, CA

- Date: November 28, 2015
- Game time: 12:30 pm
- Game attendance: 83,602
- Referee: Steve Strimling
- TV announcers (ABC/ESPN2): Sean McDonough (Play-by-play), Chris Spielman (Color) & Todd McShay (Sideline)

Game information

First quarter

- USC - Alex Wood 30-yard field goal
- UCLA - Paul Perkins 19-yard run (Kaʻimi Fairbairn kick)

Second quarter

- USC - Cody Kessler 1-yard run (Wood kick)
- UCLA - Thomas Duarte 19-yard pass from Rosen (Fairbairn kick)
- USC - Alex Wood 21-yard field goal
- USC - Adoree' Jackson 42-yard punt return (Wood kick)

Third quarter

- UCLA - Perkins 1-yard run (Fairbairn kick)
- USC - Rasheem Green 31-yard fumble return (Kessler pass failed)
- USC - Darreus Rogers 20-yard pass from Kessler (Wood kick)

Fourth quarter

- USC - Taylor McNamara 7-yard pass from Kessler (Wood kick)

Top passers

- UCLA - Josh Rosen, 19/37, 227 Yds, 1 TD, 2 INTs
- USC - Cody Kessler, 15/26, 175 Yds, 2 TDs

Top rushers

- UCLA - Paul Perkins, 17 carries, 95 Yds, 2 TDs
- USC - Justin Davis, 25 carries, 130 Yds

Top receivers

- UCLA - Thomas Duarte, 3 receptions, 63 Yds, 1 TD; Jordan Payton, 4 receptions, 60 Yds
- USC - Juju Smith-Schuster, 6 receptions, 85 Yds; Darreus Rogers, 2 receptions, 32 Yds, 1 TD

Top tacklers

- UCLA - Jayon Brown, 13 tackles
- USC - Adoree' Jackson, 3 tackles

=== Nebraska ===
Foster Farms Bowl: Nebraska Cornhsukers vs UCLA Bruins – Game summary

Quarter	1	2	3	4	Total
Nebraska	7	14	9	7	37
UCLA	7	14	0	8	29

at Levi's Stadium, Santa Clara, CA

- Date: December 26, 2015
- Game time: 6:15 pm
- Game weather: Partly cloudy
- Game attendance: 33,527
- Referee: Ron Cherry
- TV announcers (ESPN): Jason Benetti, Rod Gilmore and Shelley Smith

== Coaches ==
- Jim L. Mora, head coach
- Noel Mazzone, offensive coordinator/quarterbacks
- Adrian Klemm, associate head coach/running game coordinator/offensive line
- Tom Bradley, defensive coordinator (new to UCLA)
- Demetrice Martin, assistant head coach, defense/secondary
- Kennedy Polamalu, running backs
- Scott White, linebackers/special teams
- Eric Yarber, wide receivers
- Angus McClure, defensive line/recruiting coordinator
- Taylor Mazzone, quarterbacks coach
- Sal Alosi, coordinator of strength & conditioning
- A. J. Smith, analyst

== Rankings ==
Ranking movements Legend: ██ Increase in ranking ██ Decrease in ranking — = Not ranked RV = Received votes
	Week															
Poll	Pre	1	2	3	4	5	6	7	8	9	10	11	12	13	14	Final
AP	13	13	10	9	7	20	18	RV	24	22	18	RV	22	RV		
Coaches	14	13	12	11	10	20	18	RV	25	22	18	RV	23	RV		
CFP	Not released									23	19	—	22	—		Not released

== Awards and honors ==
=== National awards ===
Lou Groza Award: Kaʻimi Fairbairn

Foster Farms Bowl MVP: Jaleel Wadood

=== All-American teams ===
The following Pac-12 players were named to the 2015 College Football All-America Team by the Walter Camp Football Foundation (WCFF), Associated Press (AP), Football Writers Association of America (FWAA), Sporting News, and American Football Coaches Association (AFCA):

First team

Kaʻimi Fairbairn, K (WCFF, AP, FWAA, AFCA)

Second team

Kaʻimi Fairbairn, K, (SN)

Third team

Kenny Clark (AP)

=== Conference awards ===
Pac-12 Freshman Offensive Player of the Year: Josh Rosen

=== All-conference teams ===
The following players were named to the All-Pac-12 team.

First team

- Kenny Clark, DL

Second team

- Paul Perkins, RB
- Thomas Duarte, TE
- Jake Brendel, OL
- Conor McDermott, OL
- Deon Hollins, LB
- Randall Goforth, DB
- Jaleel Wadood, DB
- Kaʻimi Fairbairn, K

Honorable mention

- Jordan Payton, WR
- Aaron Wallace, LB
- Marcus Rios, DB

=== 2016 NFL draft ===
The following players were drafted into professional football following the season.

Player	Position	Round	Pick	Franchise
Kenny Clark	Defensive lineman	1	27	Green Bay Packers
Myles Jack	Linebacker	2	36	Jacksonville Jaguars
Caleb Benenoch	Offensive lineman	5	148	Tampa Bay Buccaneers
Paul Perkins	Running back	5	149	New York Giants
Jordan Payton	Wide receiver	5	154	Cleveland Browns
Aaron Wallace	Linebacker	7	222	Tennessee Titans
Thomas Duarte	Tight end	7	231	Miami Dolphins
Devin Fuller	Wide receiver	7	238	Atlanta Falcons
Jake Brendel	Center		UDFA	Dallas Cowboys
Kaʻimi Fairbairn	Kicker		UDFA	Houston Texans

== Notes ==
- February 24, 2015 – Outside linebackers/special teams coach Mike Tuiasosopo was not retained
- March 16, 2015 – Offensive line coach Adrian Klemm was suspended for alleged rules violation
- August 25, 2015 – Freshman Josh Rosen was named the starting quarterback
- October 31, 2015 – The 1965 team was honored as co-captains at the Cal game as part of its 50th anniversary celebration
