= Dorian Thompson-Robinson =

American football player (born 1999)

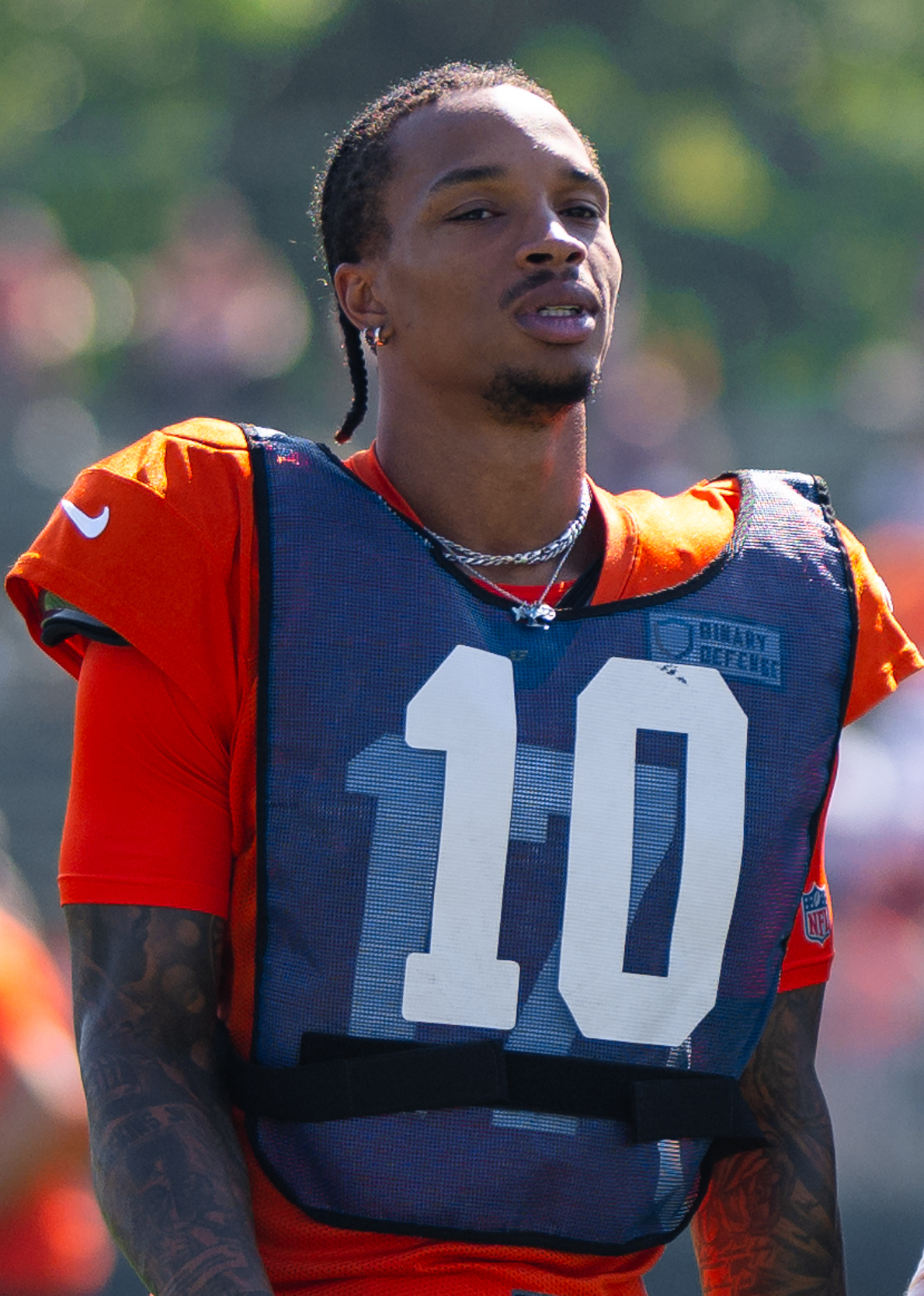
- Thompson-Robinson with the Cleveland Browns in 2023

No. 2 – Rhode Island Breakers
- Position: Quarterback
- Roster status: Active

Personal information
- Born: November 14, 1999 (age 26); Columbia, South Carolina, U.S.
- Listed height: 6 ft 2 in (1.88 m)
- Listed weight: 206 lb (93 kg)

Career information
- High school: Bishop Gorman (Las Vegas, Nevada)
- College: UCLA (2018–2022)
- NFL draft: 2023: 5th round, 140th overall pick

Career history
- Cleveland Browns (2023–2024); Philadelphia Eagles (2025)*; Orlando Storm (2026); Birmingham Stallions (2026); Rhode Island Breakers (2027–present)
- * Offseason or practice squad member only

Awards and highlights
- 2× Second-team All-Pac-12 (2020, 2021)

Career NFL statistics
- Passing attempts: 230
- Passing completions: 121
- Completion percentage: 52.6%
- TD–INT: 1–10
- Passing yards: 880
- Passer rating: 45.2
- Stats at Pro Football Reference

Dorian Trevor Thompson-Robinson (born November 14, 1999), also known by his initials DTR, is an American professional football quarterback for the Rhode Island Breakers of the United Football League (UFL). He played college football for the UCLA Bruins, earning second-team all-conference honors in the Pac-12 in 2020 and 2021 before being selected by the Cleveland Browns in the fifth round of the 2023 NFL draft.

== Early life ==
Thompson-Robinson was born on November 14, 1999, in Columbia, South Carolina, while his mother was working on her doctorate at the University of South Carolina. He attended Bishop Gorman High School in Las Vegas, Nevada. A four-star recruit, Thompson-Robinson passed for 3,275 passing yards and 38 touchdowns as a senior, and he also rushed for 426 yards and 7 touchdowns. He committed to play college football at the University of California, Los Angeles (UCLA).

== College career ==
=== 2018 season ===
Thompson-Robinson saw action in ten games in 2018, his freshman season at UCLA. Of those ten games, he took the first offensive snap in seven. In a 31–24 loss to No. 10 Washington on October 6, Thompson-Robinson completed 27 of 38 passes for 272 yards and two touchdowns. The following week, on October 13, Thompson-Robinson completed 13 of 15 passes in a 37–7 victory over California for an 86.6% completion percentage. This was third-highest completion percentage by a UCLA quarterback since 1980 in a game with at least 15 passes.

=== 2019 season ===
Thompson-Robinson became the starting quarterback in 2019, his sophomore season. He started 11 of the 12 games that season, missing the Oregon State game with an injury. On September 21, Thompson-Robinson led the Bruins to a 67–63 comeback victory at No. 19 Washington State. Against the Cougars, Thompson-Robinson threw for 507 yards and five touchdowns, and he also ran for 57 yards and two touchdowns in the victory. His 564 total yards against Washington State was a UCLA record for total offense by a player in a game. In the Bruins' rivalry matchup against USC on November 23, Thompson-Robinson generated 431 yards of total offense against the Trojans, which was the second-most ever by a Bruin in the UCLA–USC rivalry and the ninth-best single-game performance in UCLA history.

In 2019, Thompson-Robinson amassed 2,701 passing yards and 198 rushing yards for a total of 2,899 yards of offense—the tenth-most for a UCLA player in a single season. His 25 touchdowns—21 in the air and four on the ground—also ranked tenth all-time in a single season for a UCLA player.

=== 2020 season ===
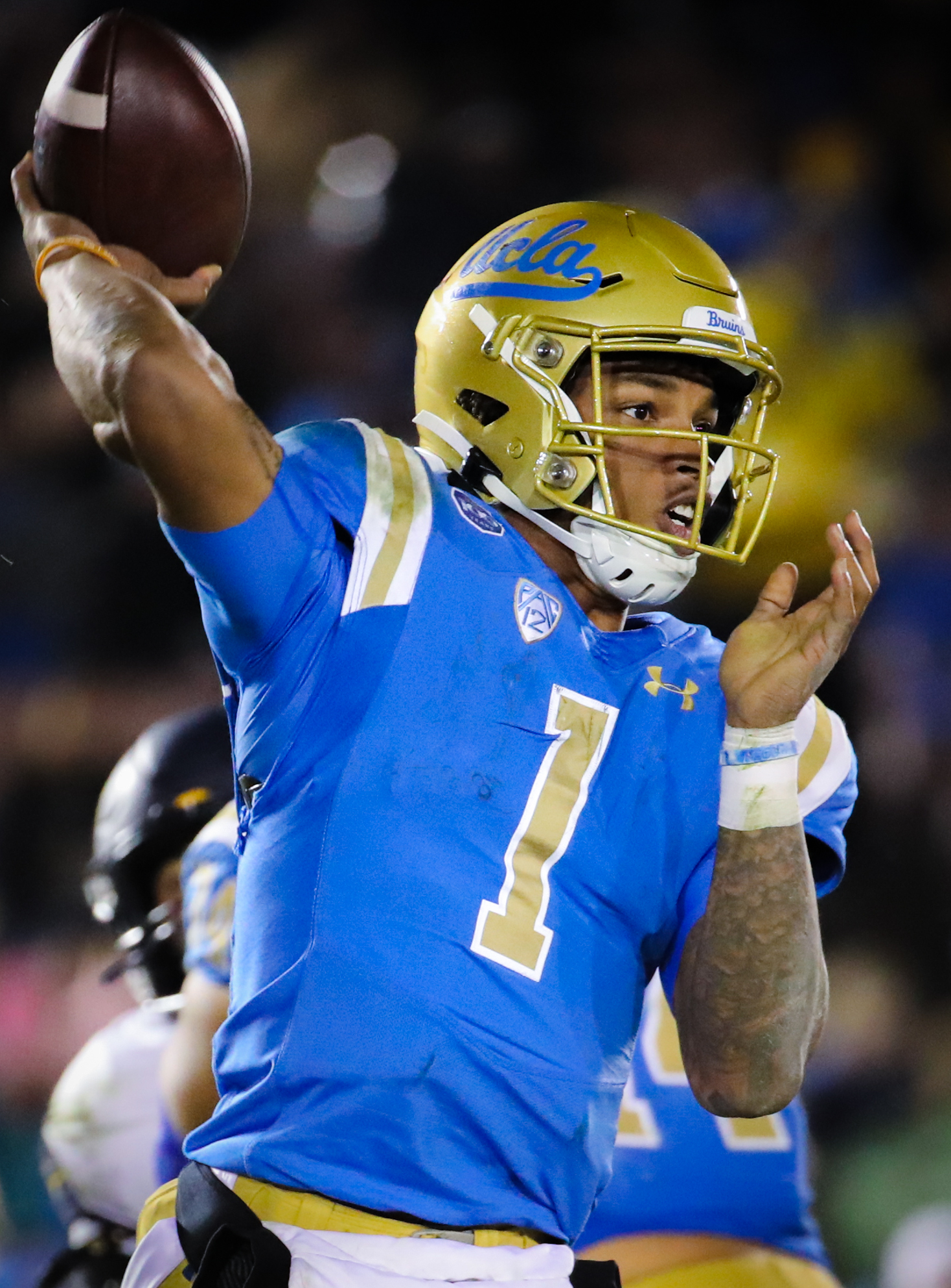
Thompson-Robinson was a two-time All-Pac-12 selection during his UCLA career.

Thompson-Robinson was once again named the starting quarterback for the 2020 season, which was delayed and shortened by the COVID-19 pandemic. In a season-opening 48–42 loss at Colorado, Thompson-Robinson completed 20 of 40 passes for 303 yards and four passing touchdowns and one interception. He also rushed for 109 yards, which included a 65-yard touchdown run in the third quarter. Thompson-Robinson's performance in the Colorado game made him the first Bruin ever to pass for 300 yards and run for 100 yards in a game.

Statistically, Thompson-Robinson saw a significant improvement over his sophomore season. He completed 65.2 percent of his passes for 12 touchdowns and four interceptions, and he also ran for 306 yards and three touchdowns. In the Bruins' December 12 matchup with No. 15 USC, Thompson-Robinson completed 83.3 percent of his passes for 364 passing yards, four touchdowns, and two interceptions. He also ran for 50 yards against the Trojans. He was named second-team All-Pac-12.

=== 2021 season ===
On December 21, 2020, Thompson-Robinson announced on Twitter that he would return to UCLA for the 2021 season. He again earned second-team all-conference honors from Pac-12 coaches, finishing with 2,409 yards passing and 21 passing touchdowns, which ranked second in the conference. He was named first-team All-Pac-12 by the Associated Press.

=== 2022 season ===
On January 10, 2022, Thompson-Robinson announced that he would return for a fifth season. The NCAA had granted all 2020 fall athletes an additional year of eligibility as a result of the COVID-19 pandemic.

In the 2022 season opener against Bowling Green, he completed 32 of 43 passes for 298 yards, two touchdowns, and one interception. In the same game, he also rushed for 87 yards and two touchdowns, one of which was a 68-yard touchdown run in the first quarter.

== Professional career ==
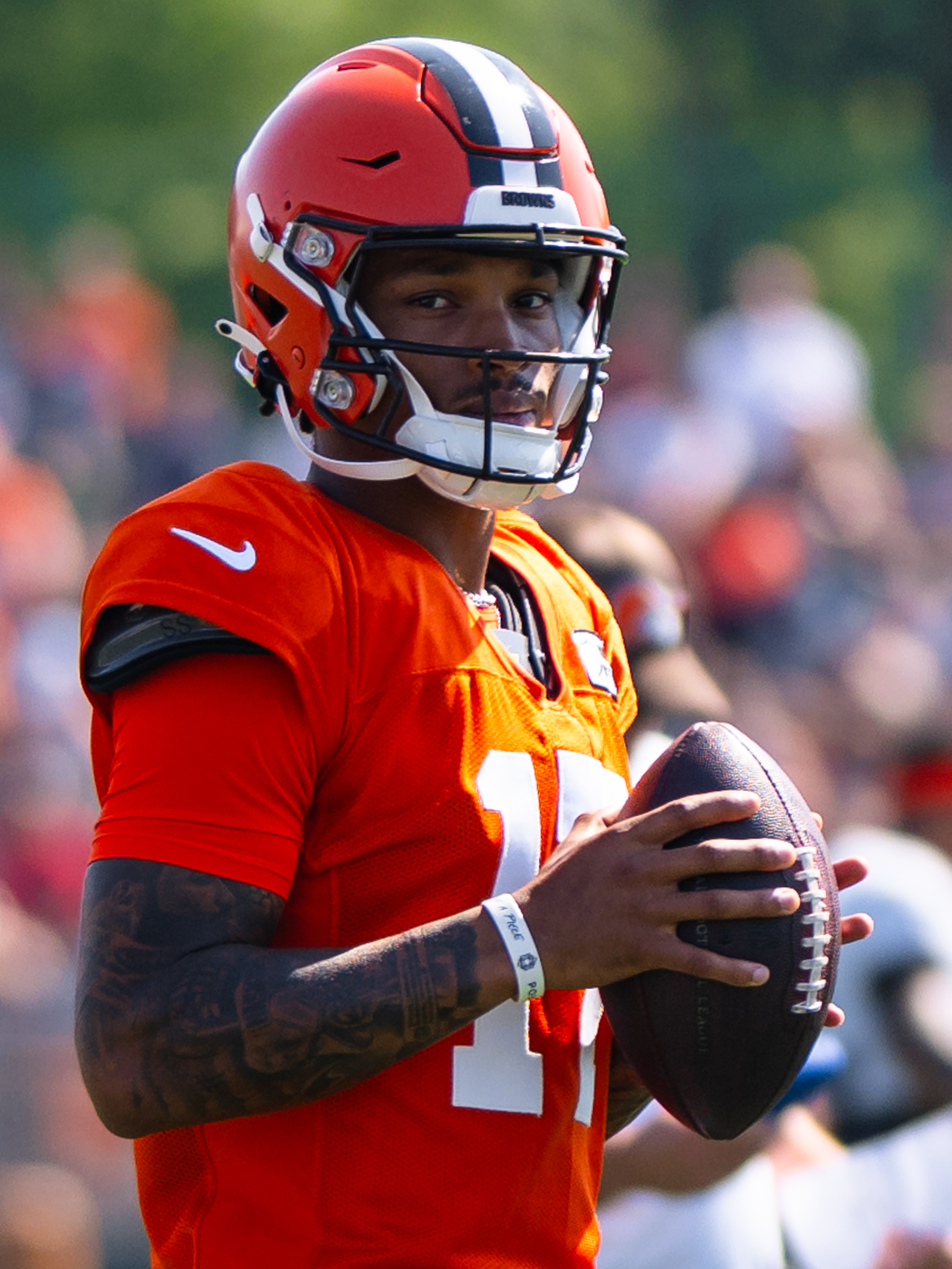
Thompson-Robinson with the Browns in 2023

Pre-draft measurables
Height	Weight	Arm length	Hand span	Wingspan	40-yard dash	10-yard split	20-yard split	20-yard shuttle	Three-cone drill	Vertical jump	Broad jump
6 ft 1 5/8 in (1.87 m)	203 lb (92 kg)	30 5/8 in (0.78 m)	9 7/8 in (0.25 m)	6 ft 2 3/4 in (1.90 m)	4.56 s	1.51 s	2.66 s	4.44 s	7.28 s	32.5 in (0.83 m)	10 ft 1 in (3.07 m)
All values from NFL Combine

=== Cleveland Browns ===
==== 2023 season ====
Thompson-Robinson was selected by the Cleveland Browns in the fifth round with the 140th pick of the 2023 NFL draft. The Browns received the 140th pick from the Los Angeles Rams after trading Troy Hill back to the Rams.

Thompson-Robinson made his preseason debut in the 2023 Hall of Fame Game, where he replaced Browns' backup quarterback Kellen Mond. After a stellar preseason, Thompson-Robinson was named the backup quarterback behind Deshaun Watson, beating out Mond and Joshua Dobbs for the position with the latter being traded to the Arizona Cardinals.

On October 1, Watson was ruled out in a game-time decision with a shoulder injury hours before the game against the Baltimore Ravens. The Browns named Thompson-Robinson the 35th starting quarterback for the Browns since their return to the league in 1999. In his debut, he threw 19 of 36 for 121 yards and three interceptions. The Browns lost, 28–3. He was benched in favor of P. J. Walker for the Browns' next game. Thompson-Robinson made his next start in Week 11 against the Pittsburgh Steelers after Watson suffered another injury and Walker was demoted; Thompson-Robinson completed four of five passes on the final drive to set up a game-winning field goal. He completed 24 of 43 passes in the game for 165 yards and one interception.

The following week against the Denver Broncos, Thompson-Robinson threw his first career touchdown pass, a two-yard score to tight end Harrison Bryant in the third quarter. Later in the game, Thompson-Robinson was knocked from the contest after a head injury from a hit by Baron Browning as he released the throw, which drew a penalty for a late hit. Cleveland lost the game 29–12. He cleared concussion protocol ahead of Week 14 but was reverted to the backup role after the Browns announced Joe Flacco would be the team's starter the remainder of the season. In Week 16, Thompson-Robinson briefly appeared during garbage time against the Houston Texans and injured his hip. He was later placed on injured reserve on December 26.

==== 2024 season ====
Thompson-Robinson began the 2024 season as the third string quarterback for the Browns. He first appeared in a regular season game on October 20, after Deshaun Watson suffered an Achilles injury. Thompson-Robinson completed 11 passes in 24 attempts for 82 yards and two interceptions in relief before leaving himself with a finger injury. He was replaced by Jameis Winston, who was named the starting quarterback for the Browns' next game; Thompson-Robinson's finger had recovered sufficiently for him to be the backup.

After Winston threw three interceptions in Cleveland's December 15 game against the Kansas City Chiefs, Thompson-Robinson replaced him as quarterback and completed 4 passes in 9 attempts with an interception. The following week, the Browns announced that Thompson-Robinson would start their upcoming game against the Cincinnati Bengals. In the 24–6 loss, he accumulated 157 yards passing and 49 rushing, but threw two interceptions and was sacked five times. Thompson-Robinson also started Cleveland's next game against the Miami Dolphins, and completed 24 passes in 47 attempts for 170 yards, threw an interception, lost a fumble, and committed three intentional grounding penalties in a 20–3 loss.

=== Philadelphia Eagles ===
On March 12, 2025, Thompson-Robinson and a 2025 fifth-round draft pick were traded to the Philadelphia Eagles in exchange for Kenny Pickett. Thompson-Robinson was waived on August 24.

=== Orlando Storm ===
On January 12, 2026, Thompson-Robinson was selected by the Orlando Storm in the 2026 United Football League quarterback draft. Thompson-Robinson began the season as the backup quarterback to Jack Plummer. In Week 2 against the Louisville Kings, he made his Storm debut after briefly replacing an injured Plummer, completing 2 of 3 passes for 19 yards while rushing once for six yards in a 19–9 victory. It was his only appearance through the team's first four games.

=== Birmingham Stallions ===
On April 19, 2026, Thompson-Robinson was traded to the Birmingham Stallions for quarterback Matt Corral and defensive end Amani Bledsoe. Thompson-Robinson was named the Stallions' starting quarterback by head coach A. J. McCarron ahead of the team's Week 5 matchup against the DC Defenders. Less than a week after joining the team, he led the Stallions to a season-high 28 points in a 45–28 loss, completing 28 of 43 passes for 313 yards with two touchdowns and two interceptions while also rushing for 43 yards and a touchdown. The following week, Thompson-Robinson earned his first win as Birmingham's starter against his former team, completing 19 of 27 passes for 271 yards and a touchdown in a 20–17 victory.

== Career statistics ==
=== NFL ===
Year	Team	Games			Passing									Rushing					Sacks		Fumbles	
Year	Team	GP	GS	Record	Cmp	Att	Pct	Yds	Y/A	Lng	TD	Int	Rtg	Att	Yds	Avg	Lng	TD	Sck	SckY	Fum	Lost
2023	CLE	8	3	1–2	60	112	53.6	440	3.9	23	1	4	51.2	14	65	4.6	12	0	6	60	2	0
2024	CLE	7	2	0–2	61	118	51.7	440	3.7	29	0	6	39.5	21	122	5.8	34	0	8	47	3	1
Career		15	5	1–4	121	230	52.6	880	3.8	29	1	10	45.2	35	187	5.3	34	0	14	107	5	1

=== UFL ===
Year	Team	Games			Passing									Rushing				
Year	Team	GP	GS	Record	Cmp	Att	Pct	Yds	Y/A	Lng	TD	Int	Rtg	Att	Yds	Avg	Lng	TD
2026	ORL	1	0	—	2	3	66.7	19	6.3	12	0	0	84.0	1	6	6.0	6	0
2026	BHAM	6	6	3–3	100	178	56.2	1,138	6.4	56	8	6	76.5	24	96	4.0	16	1
Career		7	6	3–3	102	181	56.2	1,157	6.4	56	8	6	76.6	25	102	4.1	16	1

=== College ===
Season	Team	Games			Passing								Rushing			
Season	Team	GP	GS	Record	Cmp	Att	Pct	Yds	Avg	TD	Int	Rtg	Att	Yds	Avg	TD
2018	UCLA	10	8	1–7	112	194	57.7	1,311	6.8	7	4	122.3	50	68	1.4	0
2019	UCLA	11	11	4–7	216	362	59.7	2,701	7.5	21	12	134.9	118	198	1.7	4
2020	UCLA	5	5	2–3	90	138	65.2	1,120	8.1	12	4	156.3	55	306	5.6	3
2021	UCLA	11	11	8–3	176	284	62.0	2,409	8.5	21	6	153.4	130	609	4.7	9
2022	UCLA	13	13	9–4	266	382	69.6	3,154	8.3	27	10	157.1	117	646	5.5	12
Career		50	48	24–24	860	1,359	63.3	10,695	7.9	88	36	145.5	470	1,827	3.9	28

== Personal life ==
Thompson-Robinson's parents are Michael Robinson and Dr. Melva Thompson-Robinson, a public health professor at UNLV. He has one brother and one sister.
