= 1999 UCLA Bruins football team =

American college football season

1999 UCLA Bruins football
- Conference: Pacific-10 Conference
- Record: 4–7 (2–6 Pac-10)
- Head coach: Bob Toledo (4th season)
- Offensive coordinator: Al Borges (4th season)
- Offensive scheme: Pro-style
- Defensive coordinator: Bob Field (15th season)
- Base defense: 4–3
- Home stadium: Rose Bowl

1999 Pacific-10 Conference football standings
	Conf.			Overall
Team	W		L	W		L
Stanford $	7	–	1	8	–	4
No. 19 Oregon	6	–	2	9	–	3
Washington	6	–	2	7	–	5
Arizona State	5	–	3	6	–	6
Oregon State	4	–	4	7	–	5
Arizona	3	–	5	6	–	6
USC	3	–	5	6	–	6
California	3	–	5	4	–	7
UCLA	2	–	6	4	–	7
Washington State	1	–	7	3	–	9
$ – BCS representative as conference champion; Cal later vacated 4 wins (3 in conference) due to NCAA sanctions.; Rankings from AP Poll

The 1999 UCLA Bruins football team represented the University of California, Los Angeles (UCLA) as a member of the Pacific-10 Conference (Pac-10) during the 1999 NCAA Division I-A football season. Led by fourth-year head coach Bob Toledo, the Bruins compiled an overall record of 4–7 with a mark of 2–6 in conference play, placing ninth in the Pac-10. UCLA played home games at the Rose Bowl in Pasadena, California.

== Schedule ==
Date	Time	Opponent	Rank	Site	TV	Result	Attendance
September 4	6:00 pm	Boise State*	No. 17	Rose Bowl; Pasadena, CA	FSNW2	W 38–7	46,752
September 11	8:00 pm	at No. 13 Ohio State*	No. 14	Ohio Stadium; Columbus, OH	ABC	L 20–42	93,283
September 18	7:00 pm	Fresno State*	No. 21	Rose Bowl; Pasadena, CA	FSNW2	W 35–21	42,649
September 25	2:00 pm	at Stanford	No. 18	Stanford Stadium; Stanford, CA (rivalry)		L 32–42	47,432
October 2	12:30 pm	at Arizona State		Sun Devil Stadium; Tempe, AZ	ABC	L 27–28	54,048
October 9	7:15 pm	Oregon		Rose Bowl; Pasadena, CA	FSNW	W 34–29	55,674
October 16	12:30 pm	California		Rose Bowl; Pasadena, CA (rivalry)	ABC	L 0–17	55,559
October 23	3:30 pm	at Oregon State		Reser Stadium; Corvallis, OR	FSN	L 7–55	33,427
October 30	7:00 pm	Arizona^{†}		Rose Bowl; Pasadena, CA	FSNW2	L 7–33	42,612
November 13	12:30 pm	No. 23 Washington		Rose Bowl; Pasadena, CA	ABC	W 23–20 ^{OT}	55,705
November 20	12:30 pm	at USC		Los Angeles Memorial Coliseum; Los Angeles, CA (Victory Bell)	ABC	L 7–17	91,384
*Non-conference game; ^{†}Homecoming; Rankings from AP Poll released prior to the game; All times are in Pacific time

== Rankings ==
Ranking movements Legend: ██ Increase in ranking ██ Decrease in ranking — = Not ranked RV = Received votes
	Week																
Poll	Pre	1	2	3	4	5	6	7	8	9	10	11	12	13	14	15	Final
AP	16	17	14	21	18	RV	—	—	—	—	—	—	—	—	—	—	—
Coaches Poll	15	15*	13	21	18	—	—	—	—	—	—	—	—	—	—	—	—
BCS	Not released									—	—	—	—	—	—	—	Not released

== Roster ==
1999 UCLA Bruins football team roster
Players
Coaches
Offense

Pos.	#	Name	Class
QB	11	Drew Bennett	Jr
WR	87	Danny Farmer	Sr
RB	26	DeShaun Foster	So
WR	3	Freddie Mitchell	So

Defense

Pos.	#	Name	Class
S	7	Marques Anderson	So
CB	12	Jason Bell	Jr
LB	47	Ryan Nece	So

Special teams

Pos.	#	Name	Class
LS	58	Jeff Grau	So

Head coach

- Bob Toledo

Coordinators/assistant coaches

Legend

- (C) Team captain
- (S) Suspended
- (I) Ineligible
- Injured
- Redshirt

Roster
Last update: 2000-12-04
