= Craig Bragg =

American football player (born 1982)

No. 17, 82
- Position: Wide receiver

Personal information
- Born: March 15, 1982 (age 44); San Jose, California, U.S.
- Listed height: 6 ft 1 in (1.85 m)
- Listed weight: 190 lb (86 kg)

Career information
- High school: Bellarmine (San Jose)
- College: UCLA
- NFL draft: 2005: 6th round, 195th overall pick

Career history
- Green Bay Packers (2005)*; New York Jets (2005)*; Chicago Bears (2005–2006)*; Amsterdam Admirals (2006–2007)*
- * Offseason or practice squad member only

Craig Milton Bragg (born March 15, 1982) is an American former professional football player who was a wide receiver in the National Football League (NFL). He played college football for the UCLA Bruins, setting the school record for career receptions (since surpassed by Jordan Payton). He was selected in the sixth round of the 2005 NFL draft by the Green Bay Packers, only a few picks after fellow UCLA wideout Tab Perry was chosen by the Cincinnati Bengals. Ran a sub 4.3 40 and has been unofficially clocked faster. Bragg was also a member of the New York Jets and Chicago Bears.

== College career ==
After attending Bellarmine College Preparatory in San Jose, California, Bragg played wide receiver for UCLA from 2001 to 2004, finishing as the school's career leader in receptions with 193 after breaking Kevin Jordan's previous mark of 179 set in 1995. He is also second on the list for career receiving yards and punt returns.

== Professional career ==
=== Green Bay Packers ===
Bragg was selected by the Green Bay Packers in Round 6 of the 2005 NFL Draft. Bragg competed for a spot as a reserve receiver and kick returner for the Packers, but failed to make the regular season roster. He was signed to the Packers practice squad on September 5, 2005. Bragg was released from the practice squad on November 1, 2005.

=== New York Jets ===
The New York Jets signed Craig Bragg to their practice squad on November 8, 2005. Bragg was released from the Jets practice squad on November 25, 2005.

=== Chicago Bears ===
The Chicago Bears signed Craig Bragg to their practice squad on November 30, 2005. He was signed to a future contract on February 11, 2006.

Bragg was released by the Bears on September 1, 2006.

=== Amsterdam Admirals ===
While a member of the Bears, Bragg was selected by the Amsterdam Admirals of the NFL Europe on January 28, 2006.
