= Thomas Duarte =

American football player (born 1995)

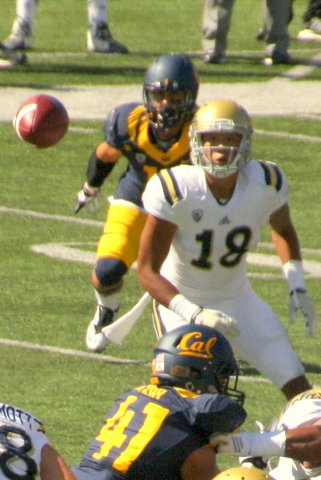
- Duarte (No. 18) with the UCLA Bruins in 2014

No. 83
- Position: Tight end

Personal information
- Born: March 30, 1995 (age 31); Fullerton, California, U.S.
- Listed height: 6 ft 2 in (1.88 m)
- Listed weight: 241 lb (109 kg)

Career information
- High school: Mater Dei (Santa Ana, California)
- College: UCLA
- NFL draft: 2016: 7th round, 231st overall pick

Career history
- Miami Dolphins (2016–2017); Los Angeles Chargers (2018)*; Arizona Hotshots (2019); Carolina Panthers (2019)*; Atlanta Falcons (2019)*
- * Offseason or practice squad member only

Awards and highlights
- Second-team All-Pac-12 (2015)
- Stats at Pro Football Reference

Thomas James Duarte (born March 30, 1995) is an American former professional football player who was a tight end in the National Football League (NFL). He played college football for the UCLA Bruins and earned second-team All-Pac-12 Conference honors as a junior in 2015. After forgoing his final year of college eligibility to enter the 2016 NFL draft, he was selected by the Miami Dolphins in the seventh round. He spent most of his two seasons with the Dolphins on their practice squad. He played for the Arizona Hotshots of the Alliance of American Football (AAF) in 2019.

== Early life ==
Duarte was born in Fullerton, California to Timothy and Deborah Duarte. Growing up, Duarte was always big. At age 10, he was 5 feet 5 inches (1.65 m) and 120 pounds (54 kg). He played tackle football for a year against players who were three to four years older. However, he went back to playing flag football after the players his size entered high school, and he became too big to play Pop Warner football due to their weight restrictions.

Duarte returned to tackle football as a high school freshman at Mater Dei High in Santa Ana. As a senior, he had 58 receptions with 1,025 receiving yards and 15 touchdowns and averaged 18 yards a catch. He also played on defense at linebacker, and had 42 tackles, 10 quarterback sacks, three interceptions and a fumble recovery. He was named Player of the Year by the Los Angeles Times and Offensive Player of the Year by The Orange County Register.

The son of a Mexican-American father and Japanese-American mother, Duarte was one of the rare high-profile college recruits to be of Asian descent. He was rated a four-star prospect and capable of playing tight end, H-back, or wide receiver in college. He decided to attend the University of California, Los Angeles (UCLA), his mother's alma mater.

== College career ==
Duarte struggled with hamstring injuries during his first two seasons with the Bruins. In his junior year in 2015, he was a second-team All-Pac-12 selection at tight end. He finished the season with 53 receptions for 872 yards, and led the team with 10 touchdown catches. His 16.6 yards per reception was the highest among UCLA receivers with 10 or more catches. After the season, he opted to forgo his final year of college eligibility and enter the 2016 NFL draft.

== Professional career ==
=== Pre-draft ===
Duarte was the top performer in his position on the 40-yard dash, vertical jump, broad jump, 3-cone drill and the 20-yard shuttle at 2016 NFL Combine.

Pre-draft measurables
Height	Weight	Arm length	Hand span	40-yard dash	20-yard shuttle	Three-cone drill	Vertical jump	Broad jump	Bench press
6 ft 2 1/8 in (1.88 m)	231 lb (105 kg)	33 in (0.84 m)	10 in (0.25 m)	4.72 s	4.24 s	6.97 s	33.5 in (0.85 m)	9 ft 10 in (3.00 m)	12 reps
All values from NFL Combine,

=== Miami Dolphins ===
Duarte was selected by the Miami Dolphins in the seventh round, 231st overall, in the 2016 NFL draft. On September 3, 2016, he was released by the Dolphins as part of final roster cuts. Duarte was later re-signed to the team's practice squad. He was promoted to the active roster on November 5. The next day, Duarte was in for two snaps in a 27–23 win over the New York Jets in his only action for the Dolphins during the season.

On September 2, 2017, Duarte was waived by the Dolphins; he was re-signed to the practice squad the following day. He was promoted to the active roster on December 20 to replace tight end Julius Thomas, who was placed on injured reserve.

During the 2018 offseason, Duarte missed part of the team's training program with a shoulder injury. He returned for training camp but was among the Dolphins final cuts before the regular season after he failed to supplant veterans MarQueis Gray and A. J. Derby.

=== Los Angeles Chargers ===
On September 3, 2018, Duarte was signed to the Los Angeles Chargers' practice squad. He was released by the Chargers on September 25.

=== Arizona Hotshots ===
In 2019, Duarte joined the Arizona Hotshots of the Alliance of American Football. He caught eight passes for 111 yards and two touchdowns before the league suspended operations mid-season.

=== Carolina Panthers ===
Duarte signed with the Carolina Panthers on April 8, 2019. He was waived by the Panthers on May 13.

=== Atlanta Falcons ===
On August 24, 2019, Duarte was signed by the Atlanta Falcons. He was waived by the Falcons on August 31.
