= Cory Paus =

American football player (born 1980)

Profile
- Position: Quarterback

Personal information
- Born: April 4, 1980 (age 46); Hinsdale, Illinois, U.S.
- Listed height: 6 ft 2 in (1.88 m)
- Listed weight: 212 lb (96 kg)

Career information
- College: UCLA

Career history
- Calgary Stampeders (2003)

Career CFL statistics
- Passing yards: 107
- QB rating: 82.5

Cory Robert Paus (born April 4, 1980) is an American former professional football player who was a quarterback for one season with the Calgary Stampeders of the Canadian Football League (CFL). He played college football for UCLA Bruins.

Pre-draft measurables
Height	Weight
6 ft 0 1/2 in (1.84 m)	218 lb (99 kg)
Values from Pro Day

His brother, Casey Paus, played quarterback at the University of Washington.
