= Sean LaChapelle =

American football player (born 1970)

No. 45, 18, 88
- Position: Wide receiver

Personal information
- Born: July 29, 1970 (age 56); Sacramento, California, U.S.
- Listed height: 6 ft 3 in (1.91 m)
- Listed weight: 205 lb (93 kg)

Career information
- High school: Vintage (Napa, California)
- College: UCLA
- NFL draft: 1993: 5th round, 122nd overall pick

Career history
- Los Angeles Rams (1993); Scottish Claymores (1996); Kansas City Chiefs (1996–1997); San Francisco 49ers (1999)*
- * Offseason or practice squad member only

Awards and highlights
- WLAF Offensive MVP (1996); Second-team All-American (1991); First-team All-Pac-10 (1991); Scottish Claymores Hall of Fame (2000)

Career NFL statistics
- Receptions: 29
- Receiving yards: 445
- Touchdowns: 2
- Stats at Pro Football Reference

Sean Paul LaChapelle (born July 29, 1970) is an American former professional football player who was a wide receiver for two seasons in the National Football League (NFL) for the Los Angeles Rams and Kansas City Chiefs. He played college football for the UCLA Bruins, earning second-team All-American honors in 1991. He was selected in the fifth round of the 1993 NFL draft by the Rams.

LaChapelle attended Vintage High School in Napa, California, where he helped lead his team to a Sac-Joaquin Section title in his junior year. During his career at the University of California, Los Angeles, LaChapelle became one of the school's receivers catching 142 passes for 2,027 yards with 14 touchdowns. He was signed to the Chiefs after wide receiver Lake Dawson suffered a season-ending injury and was placed on injured reserve. LaChapelle was also the 1996 World League of American Football (WLAF) offensive MVP.
