= Devin Fuller =

American football player (born 1994)

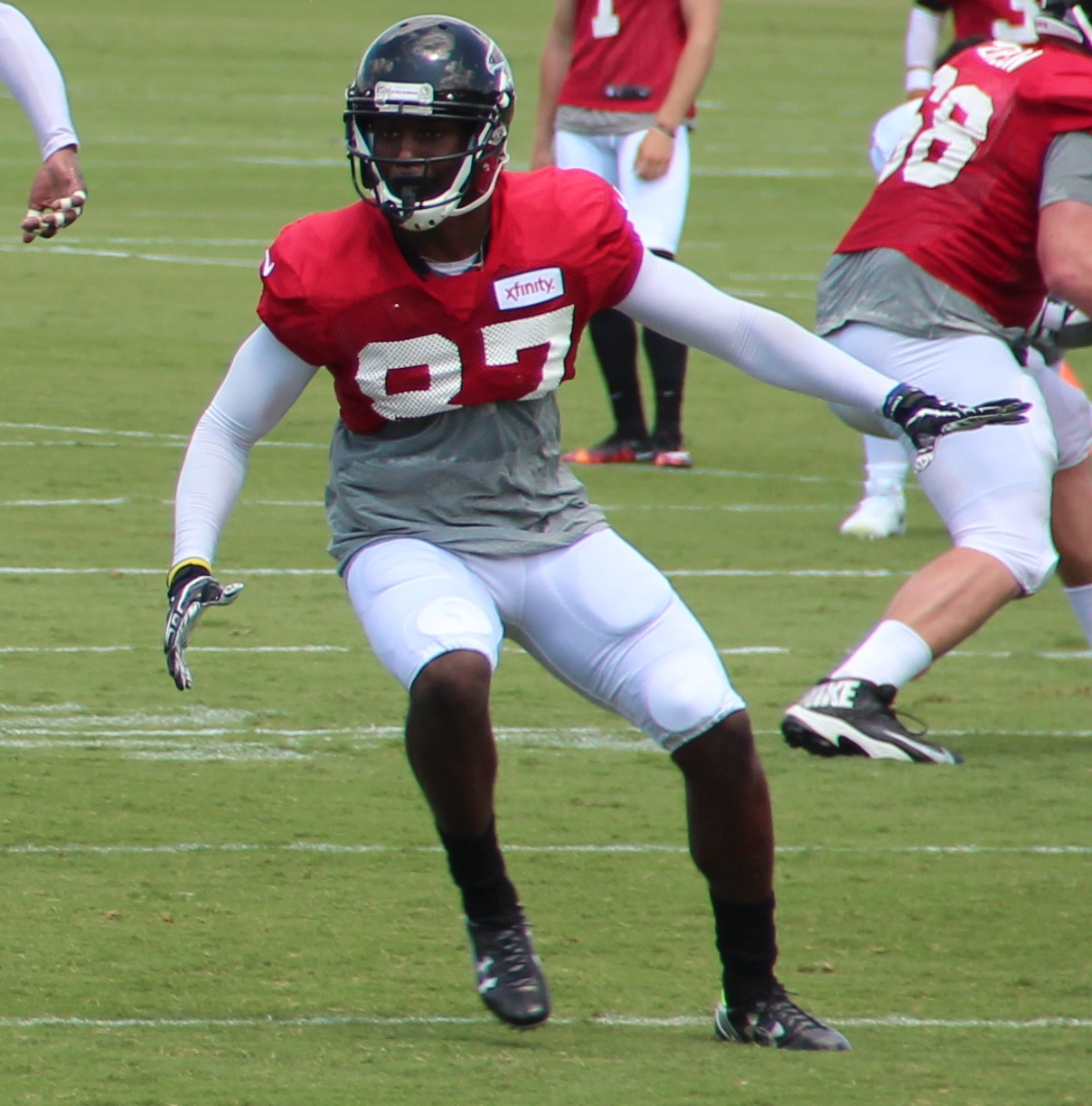
- Fuller with the Atlanta Falcons in 2016

No. 87
- Position: Wide receiver

Personal information
- Born: January 24, 1994 (age 32); Englewood, New Jersey, U.S.
- Listed height: 6 ft 0 in (1.83 m)
- Listed weight: 194 lb (88 kg)

Career information
- High school: Northern Valley Regional (Old Tappan, New Jersey)
- College: UCLA
- NFL draft: 2016: 7th round, 238th overall pick

Career history
- Atlanta Falcons (2016–2017)
- Stats at Pro Football Reference

Devin Lewis Fuller (born January 24, 1994) is an American former professional football player who was a wide receiver with the Atlanta Falcons in the National Football League (NFL). He played college football for the UCLA Bruins. Fuller was converted from quarterback to receiver as a freshman, and was the Bruins' second-leading receiver in 2013 and 2014. He was also a kick returner with UCLA. He was selected by Atlanta in the seventh round of the 2016 NFL draft.

== Early life ==
Fuller was born in Englewood, New Jersey, to Bart Fuller and Cindy Mizelle. His mother became a touring singer when she was 17. She was on tour with Luther Vandross when she found out she was pregnant with Fuller. After he was born, Fuller accompanied his mom when she would perform with Vandross, who encouraged his tour members to also bring their children along on his tour bus.

Fuller grew up in Norwood, New Jersey, and attended Northern Valley Regional High School in Old Tappan, New Jersey, where he became the team's starting quarterback as a freshman. He led Northern Valley to back to back state championship appearances as a junior and senior. As a senior, he passed for 2,247 yards and 20 touchdowns, and also ran for 1,326 yards and 17 touchdowns. For his career, he compiled over 10,000 yards of total offense (6,148 passing, 4,589 rushing) and scored 118 touchdowns (58 passing, 60 rushing).

== College career ==
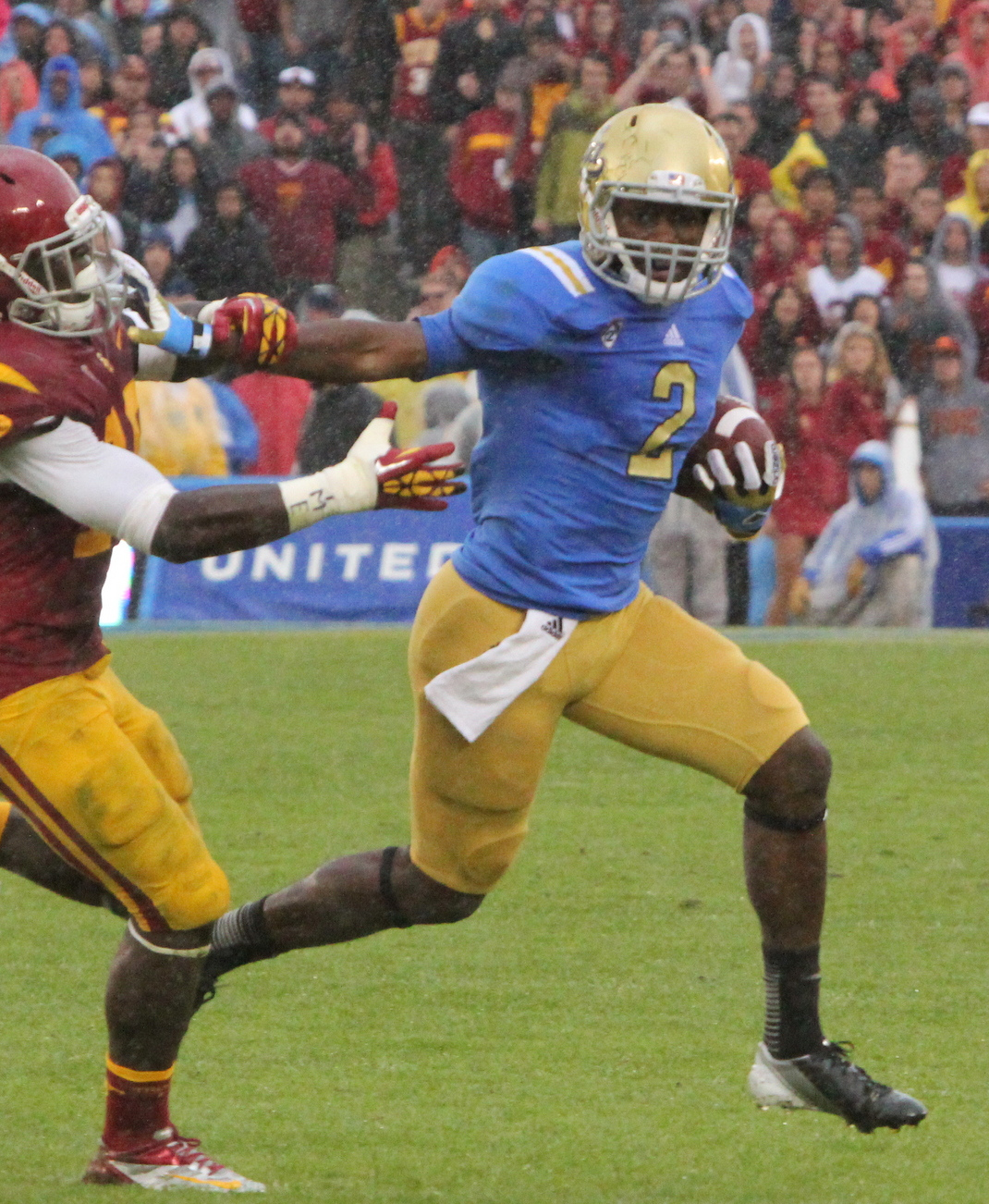
Fuller with UCLA in 2012

Fuller was recruited to UCLA as a quarterback. However, he was behind several players including Brett Hundley on the Bruins' depth chart. Wanting to get Fuller's skills on the field, they moved him to wide receiver five games into his freshman year in 2012. Playing at the slot position, Fuller had 20 receptions for 145 yards in eight games. He continued to improve, finishing with 43 catches, which ranked second on the team, for 471 yards in 2013. He also threw a touchdown pass to Hundley against Utah. As a junior in 2014, Fuller was again second in receptions, catching 59 passes for 447 yards and a touchdown. He had at least four receptions in nine games, and his 93-yard touchdown against Utah was the second-longest in UCLA history.

In his senior year in 2015, Fuller was moved from the slot to the outside to give him more matchups against man-to-man coverage. The Bruins also lost Hundley, who had left for the NFL, and replaced him with freshman Josh Rosen. Fuller had his best game of the season against California, when he caught seven passes for a career-high 100 yards and two touchdowns. However, he was hampered by injuries to his head and ankles that year, and his production fell to just 24 catches for 259 yards and three touchdowns. He still excelled as a kick returner, ranking sixth in the Pac-12 Conference with a 24.2 yard average. He finished his college career with 146 receptions for 1,322 yards and 10 touchdowns.

== Professional career ==
Pre-draft measurables
Height	Weight	Arm length	Hand span	40-yard dash	10-yard split	20-yard split	20-yard shuttle	Three-cone drill	Vertical jump	Broad jump
6 ft 0 in (1.83 m)	194 lb (88 kg)	30 1/2 in (0.77 m)	9 1/2 in (0.24 m)	4.39 s	1.59 s	2.59 s	4.07 s	7.03 s	36.0 in (0.91 m)	10 ft 4 in (3.15 m)
All values from Pro Day

Fuller was disappointed that he was not invited to the NFL Scouting Combine. However, he drew attention at the Bruins Pro Day, where he impressed NFL scouts with his 40-yard dash time of 4.37 seconds and 36-inch (91 cm) vertical jump. Fuller was selected by the Atlanta Falcons in the seventh round (238th overall) in the 2016 NFL draft. He was placed on injured reserve on August 31, 2016, after injuring his shoulder during the preseason. He missed the entire 2016 season, when the Falcons advanced to Super Bowl LI, losing 34–28 in overtime to the New England Patriots.

On July 28, 2017, Fuller tore his ACL in training camp and was placed on injured reserve for the second year in a row.

On June 29, 2018, Fuller was waived by the Falcons.
