= Jordan Lasley =

American football player (born 1996)

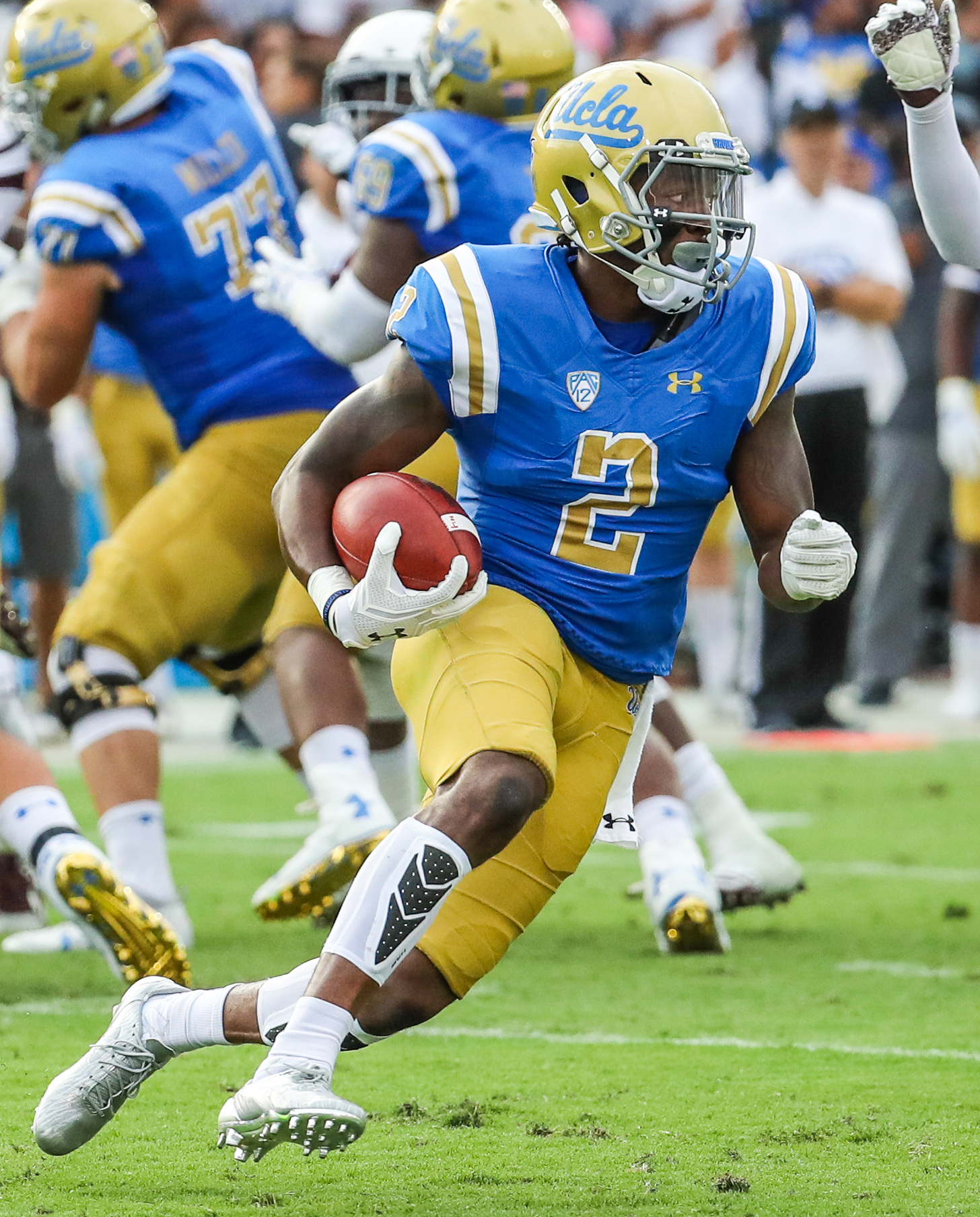
- Lasley with the UCLA Bruins in 2017

No. 2
- Position: Wide receiver

Personal information
- Born: November 13, 1996 (age 29); Compton, California, U.S.
- Listed height: 6 ft 1 in (1.85 m)
- Listed weight: 213 lb (97 kg)

Career information
- High school: Junípero Serra (Gardena, California)
- College: UCLA (2014–2017)
- NFL draft: 2018: 5th round, 162nd overall pick

Career history
- Baltimore Ravens (2018)*; Oakland Raiders (2019)*; Detroit Lions (2019)*; St. Louis BattleHawks (2020)*; Montreal Alouettes (2021)*; Tampa Bay Bandits (2022)
- * Offseason or practice squad member only
- Stats at Pro Football Reference

Jordan Lasley (born November 13, 1996) is an American former professional football wide receiver. He played college football for the UCLA Bruins and was selected by the Baltimore Ravens in the fifth round of the 2018 NFL draft.

== Early life ==
Lasley attended Serra High School in Gardena, California. As a senior, he had 34 receptions for 833 yards and 14 touchdowns. He committed to play football for the UCLA Bruins in June 2013.

== College career ==
Lasley did not play as a true freshman in 2014 and chose to redshirt.

As a redshirt freshman in 2015, Lasley played in ten games, catching three passes for 17 yards.

In 2016, Lasley had a breakout season, appearing in 11 of UCLA's 12 games, having 41 receptions for 620 yards and five touchdowns.

As a redshirt junior in 2017, Lasley played in nine games, missing three due to suspension. He caught 69 passes for 1,264 yards and nine touchdowns; he led the Pac-12 Conference in receiving yards despite his suspension. After the season, he declared for the 2018 NFL draft.

== Professional career ==
Pre-draft measurables
Height	Weight	Arm length	Hand span	Wingspan	40-yard dash	10-yard split	20-yard split	20-yard shuttle	Three-cone drill	Vertical jump	Broad jump	Bench press
6 ft 1 in (1.85 m)	203 lb (92 kg)	32 3/4 in (0.83 m)	9 5/8 in (0.24 m)	6 ft 6 1/8 in (1.98 m)	4.50 s	1.57 s	2.66 s	4.19 s	7.27 s	34.5 in (0.88 m)	9 ft 7 in (2.92 m)	8 reps
All values from NFL Combine/Pro Day

=== Baltimore Ravens ===
Lasley was selected by the Baltimore Ravens in the fifth round (162nd overall) of the 2018 NFL draft.

On July 31, 2019, Lasley was waived by the Ravens after getting into a fight with multiple teammates in practice then later throwing a football into a pond in celebration of a preseason practice touchdown catch.

=== Oakland Raiders ===
On August 1, 2019, Lasley was claimed off waivers by the Oakland Raiders. On August 18, he was waived by Oakland.

=== Detroit Lions ===
On August 20, 2019, Lasley was signed by the Detroit Lions. He was released by the Lions during final roster cuts on August 30.

=== St. Louis BattleHawks ===
In October 2019, Lasley was selected by the St. Louis BattleHawks of the XFL in the 2020 XFL draft. He was waived on January 18, 2020.

=== Montreal Alouettes ===
Lasley signed with the Montreal Alouettes of the Canadian Football League on January 22, 2021. He was released by the Alouettes on July 13.

=== Tampa Bay Bandits ===
Lasley was selected by the Tampa Bay Bandits of the United States Football League (USFL) in the 2022 USFL draft. He was released on April 28, 2022.
