= Nelson Rosario =

American football player (born 1989)

No. 80
- Position: Tight end

Personal information
- Born: December 24, 1989 (age 36); Oceanside, California
- Listed height: 6 ft 5 in (1.96 m)
- Listed weight: 245 lb (111 kg)

Career information
- High school: Oceanside (CA) El Camino
- College: UCLA
- NFL draft: 2012: undrafted

Career history
- Jacksonville Jaguars (2012)*; Carolina Panthers (2012−2013)*
- * Offseason or practice squad member only

Awards and highlights
- Henry R. "Red" Sanders Award
- Stats at Pro Football Reference

Nelson Ricardo Rosario (born December 24, 1989) is an American former football tight end. He was originally signed by the Jacksonville Jaguars as an undrafted free agent in 2012. He played college football at UCLA.

== Professional career ==
=== Jacksonville Jaguars ===
Rosario signed with the Jacksonville Jaguars following the 2012 NFL draft as a rookie free agent on May 4, 2012.

He was released on May 7, 2012.

=== Carolina Panthers ===
Rosario was signed by the Carolina Panthers on May 29, 2012. He was cut on August 31 during final cuts, but was signed to the practice squad on September 1, 2012.

On July 30, 2013, Rosario was waived by the Panthers.
