= Danny Farmer =

American football player (born 1977)

No. 83
- Position: Wide receiver

Personal information
- Born: May 21, 1977 (age 49); Los Angeles, California, U.S.
- Listed height: 6 ft 3 in (1.91 m)
- Listed weight: 217 lb (98 kg)

Career information
- High school: Loyola (Los Angeles)
- College: UCLA
- NFL draft: 2000: 4th round, 103rd overall pick

Career history
- Pittsburgh Steelers (2000)*; Cincinnati Bengals (2000–2003); Tampa Bay Buccaneers (2004)*; Miami Dolphins (2005)*
- * Offseason or practice squad member only

Awards and highlights
- First-team All-Pac-10 (1998); Second-team All-Pac-10 (1999)

Career NFL statistics
- Receptions: 43
- Receiving yards: 611
- Touchdowns: 1
- Stats at Pro Football Reference

Daniel Steven Farmer (born May 21, 1977) is an American former professional football player who was a wide receiver in the National Football League (NFL). He played college football for the UCLA Bruins and was selected by the Pittsburgh Steelers in the fourth round of the 2000 NFL draft.

After being waived by the Steelers, Farmer played for four seasons for the Cincinnati Bengals. Plagued by minor injuries, Farmer went to play with the Miami Dolphins and Tampa Bay Buccaneers.

Farmer holds the UCLA record for career receiving yards with 3,020 (1996–1999). He was also a standout volleyball player for the Bruins and won 2 National Championships. He majored in history at UCLA. In 2015, Danny joined his father George in the UCLA Athletics Hall of Fame.

His father, George, also attended UCLA and was a member of the track, football, and basketball teams, including the Bruins' 1970 NCAA championship basketball team. George also played seven years in the NFL's Chicago Bears and Detroit Lions teams. Danny's grandfather Steve Miletich was a basketball player at USC and uncle Dave Farmer played football at USC and NFL. His cousins David Farmer and Kevin Farmer played college football at Hawaii and Washington State respectively. He is also related to Pat Miletich on his mother's side. He has a fraternal twin brother, Tim, who excelled in volleyball at Loyola Marymount University and went on the play professionally in Europe. His sister Kelly is a prominent attorney in Los Angeles.

He is a 1995 graduate of Loyola High School in Los Angeles.

Farmer retired in 2006.

Pre-draft measurables
Height	Weight
6 ft 2 7/8 in (1.90 m)	217 lb (98 kg)
Values from NFL Combine

== NFL career statistics ==
Legend
**Bold**	Career high

Year	Team	Games		Receiving					
Year	Team	GP	GS	Tgt	Rec	Yds	Avg	Lng	TD
2000	CIN	**13**	**2**	**33**	**19**	**268**	14.1	38	0
2001	CIN	12	1	23	15	228	**15.2**	27	**1**
2002	CIN	8	1	15	9	115	12.8	**51**	0
		33	4	71	43	611	14.2	51	1
