= Kevin Jordan (American football) =

American football player (born 1972)

No. 86
- Position: Wide receiver

Personal information
- Born: December 14, 1972 (age 53); Washington, D.C., U.S.
- Listed height: 6 ft 1 in (1.85 m)
- Listed weight: 188 lb (85 kg)

Career information
- High school: High Point (Beltsville, Maryland)
- College: UCLA
- NFL draft: 1996: undrafted

Career history
- Arizona Cardinals (1996); Cincinnati Bengals (1996); Arizona Cardinals (1997)*; Denver Broncos (1998)*
- * Offseason or practice squad member only

Awards and highlights
- First-team All-American (1994); Second-team All-Pac-10 (1994)
- Stats at Pro Football Reference

Kevin Michael Jordan (born December 14, 1972) is an American former professional football player who was a wide receiver for one season in the National Football League (NFL). He played college football for the UCLA Bruins, receiving All-American honors as a junior in 1994. He played professionally for the Arizona Cardinals and was a member of the Cincinnati Bengals. After trying out with the Denver Broncos, he became a chaplain for UCLA sports teams as well as the NFL's Pittsburgh Steelers.

== Early life ==
Jordan attended high school at High Point High in Beltsville, Maryland. He was a 170-pound (77 kg) tight end on a team that ran the winged-T and did not pass the ball much. He was more notable as an All-American defensive back, recording 16 interceptions as a senior. He decided to attend the University of California, Los Angeles (UCLA), where he joined his brother, Al.

== College career ==
Jordan missed a season after suffering an injury in a high school all-star game, and sat out another as a redshirt. Having not played on a passing team at High Point, he needed to adjust to the more complicated schemes at UCLA. Jordan began his Bruins career with 18 receptions for 150 yards as a freshman. He followed with a solid performance of 45 catches for 612 yards in 1993, but he was overshadowed that season by teammate J. J. Stokes, who set UCLA records with 82 catches for 1,181 yards and 17 touchdowns.

In the season opener of 1994, Jordan stepped up for an injured Stokes with six receptions for 152 yards and a touchdown in a 25–23 win over Tennessee. He earned first-team All-American honors from Football News and third-team from Associated Press that season after recording 73 catches and breaking Stokes' single-season school record with 1,228 yards. He finished fourth in the nation in receiving yards per game (111.6) and sixth in receptions per game (6.6). However, Jordan injured his right knee in the final game when he was hit by two USC defenders after catch, and he had surgery to repair a partially torn ligament in February 1995. Impacted by the injury, his production dropped in 1995. Still, he finished at UCLA as the school's career leader in catches (179) and receiving yards (2,548).

== NFL career ==
Jordan was not selected in the 1996 NFL draft, but signed as a free agent with the Arizona Cardinals. He played one game for Arizona in 1996 and was active but did not see action in two games; he was on the inactive list on four others. Arizona waived him midseason in October, and he was claimed by the Cincinnati Bengals, who released him the following month. During the 1997 offseason, he married Jenny Johnson, who was a volleyball player at UCLA when they met in 1992. Jordan tried out with the Denver Broncos in 1998, but he struggled with injuries and was cut.

== Later life ==
After his playing career ended, Jordan became a missionary with Athletes in Action, a college religious organization, and also became a chaplain for the UCLA football team. Jordan and his wife relocated from Los Angeles after he accepted an offer to be the chaplain for the Pittsburgh Steelers under Coach Mike Tomlin, who later credited Jordan with establishing unity on their Super Bowl-winning team of 2009.

After four years in Pittsburgh and a second trip to the Super Bowl, Jordan and his wife returned to Los Angeles and started 4TheJourney ministry and served as chaplains for the UCLA women's basketball team.

== See also ==
- 1994 College Football All-America Team
