= Mike Fafaul =

American football player (born 1992)

Profile
- Position: Quarterback

Personal information
- Born: November 24, 1992 (age 33)
- Listed height: 6 ft 2 in (1.88 m)
- Listed weight: 215 lb (98 kg)

Career information
- High school: Loyola Blakefield (Towson, Maryland)
- College: UCLA (2012–2016)
- NFL draft: 2017: undrafted

Career history
- Albany Empire (2018); Jacksonville Sharks (2019–2020); Albany Empire (2022); Jacksonville Sharks (2022)

Awards and highlights
- NAL champion (2019)
- Stats at ArenaFan.com

Michael Fafaul (born November 24, 1992) is an American former football quarterback. He played college football for the UCLA Bruins. Professionally, he was a member of the Albany Empire of the Arena Football League (AFL), and the Jacksonville Sharks and Albany Empire of the National Arena League (NAL).

== Early life ==
Michael Fafaul was born on November 24, 1992. He played high school football at Loyola Blakefield in Towson, Maryland. He was not a starter until his senior year in 2010. He completed 121 of 202 passes (60%) for 1,803 yards, 22 touchdowns, and seven interceptions during the 2010 season, earning Big School All-State honorable mention honors. Fafaul played in the Maryland Crab Bowl all-star game after his senior season. He played for Fork Union Military Academy in 2011 to increase his college football recruiting options, leading Fork Union to an 8–1 record while throwing 14 touchdowns.

== College career ==
Fafaul played college football for the UCLA Bruins of the University of California, Los Angeles. He joined the Bruins in 2012 as a walk-on and did not play in any games that year. In 2013, he completed four of four passes for 42 yards. Fafaul served as the scout team quarterback during the 2014 season and did not appear in any games. In 2015, he completed two of two passes for 21 yards. He began his senior year in 2016 as the holder but ended up starting the final six games at quarterback after Josh Rosen suffered an injury. Overall in 2016, Fafaul completed 135 of 259 passes (52.1%) for 1,602 yards, 12 touchdowns, and 11 interceptions. He was the sixth Bruin to throw for at least 400 yards in a game, joining Rosen, Cade McNown, Drew Olson, Brett Hundley and Tommy Maddox. Fafaul and Rosen were also the first UCLA quarterback duo to throw for at least 1,000 yards each in the same season.

== Professional career ==
After going undrafted in the 2017 NFL draft, Fafaul attended rookie minicamp on a tryout basis with the Washington Redskins.

He was assigned to the Albany Empire of the Arena Football League on March 20, 2018. He was placed on recallable reassignment on May 29, but assigned to the Empire again two days later. He completed three of nine passes for 18 yards and one interception for the Empire during the 2018 season while also rushing three times for negative five yards.

Fafaul played for the Jacksonville Sharks of the National Arena League (NAL) in 2019, completing 148 of 218 passes for 1,594 yards and 41 touchdowns while helping the Sharks win the NAL championship. He re-signed with the Sharks for the 2020 season but it was later cancelled due to the COVID-19 pandemic.

On January 10, 2022, it was announced that Fafaul had signed with the Albany Empire of the NAL. He started for the Empire in Week 1 of the 2022 season but was then traded to the Jacksonville Sharks for quarterback Warren Smith. Fafaul was a backup with the Sharks in 2022.

== Personal life ==
Fafaul's cousin, Kirk Maggio, was a punter at UCLA and in the World League of American Football.
