= 2014 UCLA Bruins football team =

American college football season

2014 UCLA Bruins football

Alamo Bowl champion

Alamo Bowl, W 40–35 vs. Kansas State
- Conference: Pac-12 Conference
- South Division

Ranking
- Coaches: No. 10
- AP: No. 10
- Record: 10–3 (6–3 Pac-12)
- Head coach: Jim L. Mora (3rd season)
- Offensive coordinator: Noel Mazzone (3rd season)
- Offensive scheme: Multiple
- Defensive coordinator: Jeff Ulbrich (1st season)
- Base defense: 4–3
- Home stadium: Rose Bowl

Uniform
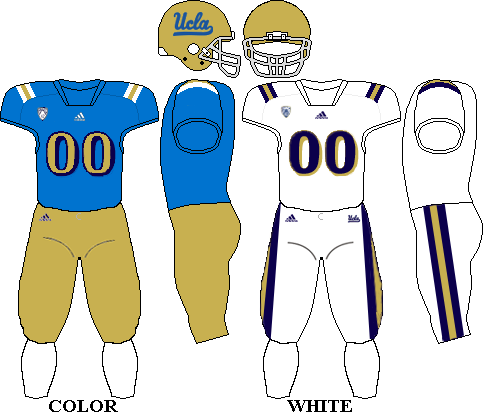

2014 Pac-12 Conference football standings
	Conf.			Overall
Team	W		L	W		L
North Division
No. 2 Oregon xy$^	8	–	1	13	–	2
Stanford	5	–	4	8	–	5
Washington	4	–	5	8	–	6
California	3	–	6	5	–	7
Oregon State	2	–	7	5	–	7
Washington State	2	–	7	3	–	9
South Division
No. 19 Arizona xy	7	–	2	10	–	4
No. 10 UCLA	6	–	3	10	–	3
No. 12 Arizona State	6	–	3	10	–	3
No. 20 USC	6	–	3	9	–	4
No. 21 Utah	5	–	4	9	–	4
Colorado	0	–	9	2	–	10
Championship: Oregon 51, Arizona 13
^ – College Football Playoff participant; $ – Conference champion; x – Division champion/co-champions; y – Championship game participant; Rankings from AP Poll

The 2014 UCLA Bruins football team represented the University of California, Los Angeles in the 2014 NCAA Division I FBS football season. The team was coached by third-year head coach Jim L. Mora and played its home games at the Rose Bowl in Pasadena, California. They were members of the South Division of the Pac-12 Conference. The team was featured in the Pac-12 Network's The Drive program.

The Bruins were ranked No. 7 in preseason national polls, and were expected to contend for not only one of the four berths in the inaugural College Football Playoff, but also the national championship. They started the season 4–0, often struggling, before suffering consecutive home losses to the Utah Utes and Oregon Ducks. After dropping out of the polls, they re-emerged as playoff contenders with five straight wins. However, UCLA lost their final home game to unranked Stanford, costing them the South Division title, a spot in the Pac-12 Championship, and any remaining shot at a CFP berth.

They concluded their season in the 2015 Alamo Bowl with a win over the Kansas State Wildcats, 40–35, and a 10-win season. It was the ninth 10-win season in school history, and just the third time in their history that UCLA had won 10 games in consecutive seasons. On the season, the Bruins outscored their opponents by a combined total of 435 to 365. They also had the most difficult strength of schedule of any team in the FBS that year.

== Recruiting ==
On February 5, 2014, Coach Mora announced that nineteen high school seniors and one transfer graduate student have signed national letters-of-intent, grants-in-aid and/or offers of admission to UCLA.

College recruiting
Name	Hometown	School	Height	Weight	40^{‡}	Commit date
Matt Dickerson; DE	San Mateo, CA	Junipero Serra High School	6 ft 5 in (1.96 m)	260 lb (120 kg)	N/A	Jan 9, 2014
Matt Dickerson; DE	Recruit ratings: Scout: Rivals: 247Sports: ESPN:					
Denzel Fisher; CB	Compton, CA	Centennial High School	6 ft 2 in (1.88 m)	170 lb (77 kg)	N/A	Sep 4, 2013
Denzel Fisher; CB	Recruit ratings: Scout: Rivals: 247Sports: ESPN:					
Cameron Griffin; MLB	Los Angeles, CA	View Park Preparatory Accelerated Charter High School	6 ft 3 in (1.91 m)	210 lb (95 kg)	N/A	Nov 8, 2013
Cameron Griffin; MLB	Recruit ratings: Scout: Rivals: 247Sports: ESPN:					
Jordan Lasley; WR	Gardena, CA	Junipero Serra High School	6 ft 2 in (1.88 m)	180 lb (82 kg)	N/A	Jun 22, 2013
Jordan Lasley; WR	Recruit ratings: Scout: Rivals: 247Sports: ESPN:					
Kolton Miller; OT	Roseville, CA	Roseville High School	6 ft 8 in (2.03 m)	280 lb (130 kg)	5.20	Jan 21, 2014
Kolton Miller; OT	Recruit ratings: Scout: Rivals: 247Sports: ESPN:					
Adarius Pickett; CB	El Cerrito, CA	El Cerrito High School	6 ft 0 in (1.83 m)	185 lb (84 kg)	N/A	Sep 3, 2013
Adarius Pickett; CB	Recruit ratings: Scout: Rivals: 247Sports: ESPN:					
Austin Roberts; WR	Carmel, IN	Carmel High School	6 ft 2 in (1.88 m)	221 lb (100 kg)	4.51	Jul 17, 2013
Austin Roberts; WR	Recruit ratings: Scout: Rivals: 247Sports: ESPN:					
Ron Robinson; S	Corona, CA	Santiago High School	6 ft 2 in (1.88 m)	195 lb (88 kg)	N/A	Jul 31, 2013
Ron Robinson; S	Recruit ratings: Scout: Rivals: 247Sports: ESPN:					
Aaron Sharp; QB	Houston, TX	Summer Creek High School	6 ft 3 in (1.91 m)	190 lb (86 kg)	4.50	Jan 20, 2014
Aaron Sharp; QB	Recruit ratings: Scout: Rivals: 247Sports: ESPN:					
Nathan Starks; RB	Englewood, CO	Cherry Creek High School	6 ft 0 in (1.83 m)	190 lb (86 kg)	4.50	Jan 4, 2014
Nathan Starks; RB	Recruit ratings: Scout: Rivals: 247Sports: ESPN:					
Ainuu Taua; DT	Lompoc, CA	Lompoc High School	6 ft 1 in (1.85 m)	270 lb (120 kg)	N/A	Dec 8, 2013
Ainuu Taua; DT	Recruit ratings: Scout: Rivals: 247Sports: ESPN:					
Najee Toran; C	Galena Park, TX	North Shore Senior High School (Texas)	6 ft 3 in (1.91 m)	258 lb (117 kg)	5.06	Nov 5, 2013
Najee Toran; C	Recruit ratings: Scout: Rivals: 247Sports: ESPN:					
Jacob Tuioti-Mariner; DE	Bellflower, CA	St. John Bosco High School	6 ft 4 in (1.93 m)	265 lb (120 kg)	N/A	Jan 7, 2014
Jacob Tuioti-Mariner; DE	Recruit ratings: Scout: Rivals: 247Sports: ESPN:					
Alex Van Dyke; WR	Elk Grove, CA	Cosumnes Oaks High School	6 ft 4 in (1.93 m)	210 lb (95 kg)	N/A	Oct 13, 2013
Alex Van Dyke; WR	Recruit ratings: Scout: Rivals: 247Sports: ESPN:					
Jaleel Wadood; S	Bellflower, CA	St. John Bosco High School	5 ft 11 in (1.80 m)	170 lb (77 kg)	N/A	Dec 10, 2013
Jaleel Wadood; S	Recruit ratings: Scout: Rivals: 247Sports: ESPN:					
Zach Whitley; MLB	Galena Park, TX	North Shore Senior High School (Texas)	6 ft 2 in (1.88 m)	220 lb (100 kg)	N/A	Jan 3, 2014
Zach Whitley; MLB	Recruit ratings: Scout: Rivals: 247Sports: ESPN:					
Dwight Williams; OLB	Gardena, CA	Junipero Serra	6 ft 1 in (1.85 m)	212 lb (96 kg)	N/A	Jan 4, 2014
Dwight Williams; OLB	Recruit ratings: Scout: Rivals: 247Sports: ESPN:					
Kenny Young; MLB	River Ridge, LA	John Curtis Christian High School	6 ft 2 in (1.88 m)	225 lb (102 kg)	4.60	Feb 5, 2014
Kenny Young; MLB	Recruit ratings: Scout: Rivals: 247Sports: ESPN:					
Overall recruit ranking: Scout: 20 Rivals: 18 247Sports: 19 ESPN: 26
Note: In many cases, Scout, Rivals, 247Sports, On3, and ESPN may conflict in their listings of height and weight.; In these cases, the average was taken. ESPN grades are on a 100-point scale.; Sources: "2014 Team Ranking". Rivals.com.

== Roster ==
2014 UCLA Bruins Roster
Offense Receivers: 3 Jordan Lasley – Freshman; 4 Darren Andrews – Sophomore; 7 Devin Fuller – Junior; 9 Jordan Payton – Junior; 10 Kenneth Walker III – (redshirt) Sophomore; 14 Mossi Johnson – Freshman; 15 Devin Lucien – (redshirt) Junior; 18 Thomas Duarte – Sophomore; 19 Zach Hernandez – (redshirt) Sophomore; 25 Andrew Huusfeldt – (redshirt) Junior; 26 Ahmaad Harris – (redshirt) Sophomore; 32 Sam Handler – (redshirt) Sophomore; 81 Tyler Scott – (redshirt) Junior; 82 Eldridge Massington – (redshirt) Freshman; 83 Alex VanDyke – Freshman; 86 Logan Sweet – (redshirt) Junior; 87 Daniel Fields – (redshirt) Freshman; 88 Austin Roberts – Freshman; 89 Zack Bornstein – Freshman; Offensive linemen: 51 Alex Redmond – Sophomore; 52 Scott Quessenberry – Sophomore; 54 Jake Brendel – (redshirt) Junior; 55 Ben Wysocki – (redshirt) Junior; 57 Carl Hulick – (redshirt) Sophomore; 58 Colby Cyburt – (redshirt) Sophomore; 61 Sam Tai – (redshirt) Junior; 68 Conor McDermott – (redshirt) Freshman; 69 Najee Toran – Freshman; 70 Simon Goines – Junior; 71 Poasi Moala – (redshirt) Freshman; 74 Caleb Benenoch – Sophomore; 75 John Lopez – (redshirt) Freshman; 76 Kenny Lacy – (redshirt) Freshman; 77 Kolton Miller – Freshman; 78 Malcom Bunche – (redshirt) Senior; Quarterbacks: 2 Asiantii Woulard – (redshirt) Freshman; 10 Jake Hall – (redshirt) Sophomore; 10 Aaron Sharp – Freshman; 11 Jerry Neuheisel – (redshirt) Sophomore; 12 Mike Fafaul – (redshirt) Sophomore; 17 Brett Hundley – (redshirt) Junior	Fullbacks: 32 Nate Iese – (redshirt) Sophomore; 48 Tre Hale – (redshirt) Senior; 85 Spencer Atkins – (redshirt) Freshman; Running backs: 6 Jordon James – (redshirt) Senior; 21 Craig Lee – (redshirt) Freshman; 22 Roosevelt Davis – (redshirt) Junior; 23 Nate Starks – Freshman; 24 Paul Perkins – (redshirt) Sophomore; 33 Steven Manfro – (redshirt) Junior (injured); 35 Ryan Davis – (redshirt) Sophomore; 37 Christian Wehrly – (redshirt) Freshman; Defense Defensive linemen: 35 Ainuu Taua – Freshman; 47 Eddie Vanderdoes – Sophomore; 50 Kevin McReynolds – (redshirt) Junior; 71 Zach Vinci – (redshirt) Junior; 72 Jake Jones – (redshirt) Sophomore; 89 Thomas Schwab – (redshirt) Freshman; 90 Ellis McCarthy – Junior; 91 Jacob Tuioti-Mariner – Freshman; 94 Owamagbe Odighizuwa – (redshirt) Senior; 96 Eli Ankou – (redshirt) Sophomore; 97 Kenneth Clark – Sophomore; 99 Matt Dickerson – Freshman; Linebackers: 6 Eric Kendricks – (redshirt) Junior; 17 Dwight Williams – Freshman; 12 Jayon Brown – Sophomore; 28 Taylor Lagace – (redshirt) Sophomore; 30 Myles Jack – Sophomore; 40 Cameron Griffin – Freshman; 41 Zach Whitley – Freshman; 42 Kenny Young – Freshman; 43 Willie Green – (redshirt) Sophomore; 44 Issako Savaiinaea – Sophomore; 45 Cameron Judge – Sophomore; 46 Kenny Orjioke – Junior; 51 Aaron Wallace Jr. – (redshirt) Junior; 53 Ryan Hofmeister – (redshirt) Senior; 55 Sean Burd – (redshirt) Junior; 58 Deon Hollins – Sophomore	Defensive backs: 1 Ishmael Adams – Junior; 2 Jaleel Wadood – Freshman; 3 Randall Goforth – Junior; 7 John Johnson – (redshirt) Freshman; 8 Adarius Pickett – Freshman; 9 Marcus Rios – (redshirt) Sophomore; 10 Fabian Moreau – Junior; 15 Priest Willis – Sophomore; 18 Charles Dawson – Sophomore; 20 Justin Combs – (redshirt) Sophomore; 21 Tahaan Goodman – Sophomore; 22 Tyler Foreman – (redshirt) Freshman; 23 Anthony Jefferson – (redshirt) Senior; 25 Denzel Fisher – Freshman; 26 Michael Carlson – (redshirt) Freshman; 27 Alex Staff – (redshirt) Freshman; 29 Erik Zumwalt – (redshirt) Junior; 31 Librado Barocio – (redshirt) Senior; 32 Ron Robinson – Freshman; 33 Dylan Luther – (redshirt) Freshman; Special teams Punters/Kickers: 15 Kaʻimi Fairbairn – Junior PK/KO; 20 Stefan Flintoft – Freshman PK; 39 Adam Searl – (redshirt) Freshman; 46 Matt Mengel – Junior P; Long snappers: 45 Peter Hajimihalis – (redshirt) Junior; 59 Christopher Longo – (redshirt) Junior; Punt Returners/Kickoff Returners: 3 Randall Goforth – Sophomore PR; 4 Darren Andrews – Sophomore PR/KR; 7 Devin Fuller – Junior PR/KR; 10 Kenneth Walker III – (redshirt) Sophomore KR; 22 Roosevelt Davis – (redshirt) Junior KR; 1 Ishmael Adams – Junior PR/KR; 33 Steven Manfro – (redshirt) Junior PR/KR
Source: UCLA Bruins Football 2014 Media Guide

== Pre-season ==
- Tuesday, March 11, 2014 – Pro Day
- Tuesday, April 1 to Saturday, April 26, 2014 – Spring football
- Saturday, April 26, 2014 – Spring Football Game at StubHub Center, in Carson, California 5:00 p.m., on Pac-12 Network

== Schedule ==
Date	Time	Opponent	Rank	Site	TV	Result	Attendance
August 30	9:00 am	at Virginia*	No. 7	Scott Stadium; Charlottesville, VA	ESPN	W 28–20	44,749
September 6	7:00 pm	Memphis*	No. 11	Rose Bowl; Pasadena, CA	P12N	W 42–35	72,098
September 13	5:00 pm	vs. Texas*	No. 12	AT&T Stadium; Arlington, TX (Advocare Cowboys Showdown)	FOX	W 20–17	60,479
September 25	7:00 pm	at No. 15 Arizona State	No. 11	Sun Devil Stadium; Tempe, AZ	FS1	W 62–27	60,876
October 4	7:30 pm	Utah	No. 8	Rose Bowl; Pasadena, CA	ESPN	L 28–30	74,329
October 11	12:30 pm	No. 12 Oregon	No. 18	Rose Bowl; Pasadena, CA	FOX	L 30–42	80,139
October 18	12:30 pm	at California		California Memorial Stadium; Berkeley, CA (rivalry)	ABC/ESPN2	W 36–34	49,257
October 25	11:00 am	at Colorado	No. 25	Folsom Field; Boulder, CO	P12N	W 40–37 ^{2OT}	37,442
November 1	7:30 pm	No. 12 Arizona^{†}	No. 22	Rose Bowl; Pasadena, CA	ESPN	W 17–7	80,246
November 8	4:00 pm	at Washington	No. 18	Husky Stadium; Seattle, WA	FS1	W 44–30	65,547
November 22	5:00 pm	No. 19 USC	No. 9	Rose Bowl; Pasadena, CA (Victory Bell/rivalry)	ABC	W 38–20	82,431
November 28	12:30 pm	Stanford	No. 8	Rose Bowl; Pasadena, CA (rivalry)	ABC	L 10–31	70,658
January 2	3:45 pm	vs. No. 11 Kansas State*	No. 14	Alamodome; San Antonio, TX (Alamo Bowl)	ESPN	W 40–35	60,517
*Non-conference game; ^{†}Homecoming; Rankings from AP Poll and CFP Rankings after October 28 released prior to game; All times are in Pacific time

== Game summaries ==
=== Virginia ===
UCLA, playing for the first time in the Commonwealth of Virginia, is 17–13 all-time versus current members of the ACC. UCLA defeated ACC's Virginia Tech in the 2013 Sun Bowl, 42–12.

#7 UCLA Bruins vs Virginia Cavaliers – Game summary

Quarter	1	2	3	4	Total
#7 UCLA	0	21	7	0	28
Virginia	0	10	7	3	20

at Scott Stadium, Charlottesville, VA

- Date: August 31, 2014
- TV announcers (ESPN): Bob Wischusen (Play-by-play), Matt Millen (Color), & Quint Kessenich (Sideline)

Game information

Second quarter

- UCLA – Ishmael Adams 20-yard interception of Greyson Lambert pass (Kaim Fairbairn kick)
- UVA – Ian Frye 35-yard field goal
- UCLA – Randall Goforth 75-yard fumble return (Fairbairn kick)
- UCLA – Eric Kendricks 37-yard interception return (Fairbairn kick)
- UVA – Andre Levrone 29-yard pass from Matt Johns (Frye kick)

Third quarter

- UVA – Darius Jennings 23-yard pass from Johns (Frye kick)
- UCLA – Brett Hundley 6-yard run (Fairbairn kick)

Fourth quarter

- UVA – Frye 27-yard field goal

Top passers

- UCLA – Brett Hundley, 20/33, 242 yds
- UVA – Matt Johns, 23/22, 154 yds, 2 TDs

Top rushers

- UCLA – Paul Perkins, 16 carries / 80 yds
- UVA – Kevin Parks, 17 carries / 55 yds

Top receivers

- UCLA – Jordan Payton, 8 receptions / 98 yds
- UVA – Andre Levrone, 3 receptions / 75 yds

Top tacklers

- UCLA – Eric Kendricks, 16 tackles
- UVA – Henry Coley, 14 tackles

Seventh-ranked UCLA defeated the Virginia Cavaliers 28–20 after scoring three defensive touchdowns in the second quarter. Hundley, considered among the nation's leading quarterbacks, ran for a critical touchdown in the third quarter for the Bruins' only touchdown on offense. UCLA's defense had not recorded three touchdowns since 1986.

The Bruins played without two starters on the offensive line, and Virginia's defense disrupted Hundley throughout the game, sacking him five times. However, the Bruins led 21–3 after their third defensive score, forcing Virginia to replace starting quarterback Greyson Lambert with Matt Johns. The Cavaliers, who were just 2–10 a year earlier, pulled to within 21–17 before Hundley capped a 66-yard drive late in the third quarter with a 6-yard touchdown run after overpowering safety Quin Blanding at the three-yard line. Virginia was deep inside UCLA territory late in the game when Myles Jack disrupted a John's pass on fourth-and-8 to end the drive.

Ishmael Adams returned a tipped Lambert pass 20 yards for the Bruins first score. Randall Goforth returned a fumble 75 yards for another touchdown, and Eric Kendricks returned another Lambert interception 37 yards for a score.

=== Memphis ===
Honorary captain – UCLA will honor Sam Storey '34, Kenny Washington '41 and Woody Strode '41 at this week's game. Washington and Strode are featured in the film Forgotten Four: The Integration of Pro Football, which is the story of four African Americans who courageously broke the color barrier in professional football.

Memphis Tigers vs #11 UCLA Bruins – Game summary

Quarter	1	2	3	4	Total
Memphis	7	14	0	14	35
#11 UCLA	13	15	7	7	42

at Rose Bowl, Pasadena, CA

- Date: September 6, 2014
- TV announcers (P12N): Ted Robinson (Play-by-play), Glenn Parker (Color), & Jill Savage (Sideline)
- Boxscore

Game information

First quarter

- UCLA – Paul Perkins 17-yard run (Kaʻimi Fairbairn PAT failed)
- MEM – Paxton Lynch 8-yard run (Jake Elliott kick)
- UCLA – Kenneth Walker 62-yard pass from Brett Hundley (Fairbairn kick)

Second quarter

- MEM – Sam Craft 7-yard run (Elliott Kick)
- UCLA – Thomas Duarte 14-yard pass from Hundley (Fairbairn kick)
- UCLA – Paul Perkins 4-yard run (Hundley Pass to Tyler Scott for two-point conversion)
- MEM – Brandon Hayes 18-yard pass from Lynch (Elliott kick)

Third quarter

- UCLA – Myles Jack 4-yard run (Fairbairn Kick)

Fourth quarter

- MEM – Doroland Dorceus 40-yard run (Elliott Kick)
- MEM – Fritz Etienne 17-yard interception return (Elliott kick)
- UCLA – Duarte 33-yard pass from Hundley (Fairbairn kick)

Top passers

- MEM – Paxton Lynch, 27/41, 305 yards, 1 TD
- UCLA -Brett Hundley, 33/44. 396 yards, 3 TD, 1 INT

Top rushers

- MEM – Doroland Dorceus, 13/86 yards, 1TD
- UCLA – Paul Perkins, 23/98 yards, 2TD

Top receivers

- MEM – Tevin Jones, 3/74 yards
- UCLA – Thomas Duarte, 4/110, 2TD

Top tacklers

- MEM – Tank Jakes, 11.5 tackles
- UCLA – Eric Kendricks, 9.5 tackles

UCLA's offense rebounded from the previous week to gain 540 yards as the Bruins won 42–35 over the Memphis Tigers in another tougher-than-expected game. Hundley threw a 33-yard touchdown to Thomas Duarte for the go-ahead score with 10:52 remaining, and the UCLA defense stopped three drives from the Tigers to secure their fourth straight win in a home opener. Hundley passed for 396 yards and three touchdowns in the game.

While their offense looked fine, UCLA's defense surrendered 469 yards. Memphis quarterback Paxton Lynch threw for 305 yards and a touchdown. UCLA twice led by 14 points, and led 35–21 after three quarters, but the Tigers tied the score at 35 with 13 minutes left in the fourth when Fritz Etienne returned a Hundley interception 17 yards for a touchdown. Duarte's game-winning catch was his second touchdown of the game. Paul Perkins rushed for two touchdowns in the game, and Jack spent time as a running back, running for his first touchdown of the season. The linebacker Jack was both the Pac-12's offensive and defensive newcomer of the year the prior season.

Memphis had won just 12 games over the prior five seasons. They drove the ball to the UCLA 41-yard line when the game clock expired. "We're happy to get the win, but we're certainly not happy to be playing the way we're playing," UCLA coach Jim Mora said.

=== Texas (Advocare Cowboys Showdown) ===
#12 UCLA Bruins vs Texas Longhorns – Game summary

Quarter	1	2	3	4	Total
#12 UCLA	3	0	7	10	20
Texas	0	10	0	7	17

at AT&T Stadium, Arlington, TX

- Date: September 13, 2014
- TV announcers (FOX): Gus Johnson (Play-by-play), Charles Davis (Color), & Molly McGrath (Sideline)
- Boxscore

Game information

First quarter

- UCLA – Kaʻimi Fairbairn 47-yard field goal

Second quarter

- UT – Nick Rose 33-yard field goal
- UT – M.J. McFarland 2-yard pass from Tyrone Swoopes (Rose kick)

Third quarter

- UCLA – Nate Iese 3-yard pass from Jerry Neuheisel (Fairbairn kick)

Fourth quarter

- UCLA – Fairbairn 25-yard field goal
- UT – John Harris 8-yard pass from Swoopes (Rose kick)
- UCLA – Jordan Payton 33-yard pass from Neuheisel (Fairbairn kick)

Top passers

- UCLA – Jerry Neuheisel, 23/30, 178 yards, 2 TD
- UT – Tyrone Swoopes, 24/34, 196 yards, 2 TD

Top rushers

- UCLA – Paul Perkins, 24/126 yards
- UT – Malcolm Brown, 14/69 yards

Top receivers

- UCLA – Paul Perkins, 5/69 yards
- UT – Jaxon Shipley, 9/65 yards

Backup quarterback Jerry Neuheisel threw a game-winning 33-yard touchdown pass to Jordan Payton with three minutes remaining in the game to defeat the Texas Longhorns 20–17. Neuheisel threw two touchdowns in the game after starting quarterback Hundley injured his left elbow in the first quarter. The third-year sophomore and son of former UCLA coach Rick Neuheisel was carried off the field by teammates after the game.

Hundley was hurt on UCLA's second possession of the game with 4:29 remaining in the first quarter when he landed awkwardly after reaching down at the Bruins 35 while being tackled after an 11-yard run to convert a third-and-nine. UCLA scored its first TD on the opening drive of the second half, going 75 yards on seven plays. Perkins began the drive with a 58-yard run, which led to the Neuheisel's game-tying 3-yard pass to Nate Iese. Texas went ahead with 5:13 left in the game when quarterback Tyrone Swoopes connected with John Harris on an 8-yard TD pass. The Longhorns then recovered a fumble, but the UCLA defense forced a punt after three plays. UCLA's Adams returned the kick 58 yards, which set up Neuheisel's game-winning toss on the following play.

Neuheisel completed 23 of 30 passes for 178 yards. Perkins added 126 yards on 24 carries for the Bruins, and caught five passes for 69 yards. UCLA kicker Kaʻimi Fairbairn made a 47-yard field goal to give UCLA an early 3–0 lead. He had struggled in his career from long range—the kick made him eight of 16 from 40 or more yards in his career. UCLA won the coin toss before the game and elected to differ, but Texas also chose to kickoff in the second half, which allowed the Bruins to receive both halves' opening kickoff.

=== Arizona State ===
#11 UCLA Bruins vs #15 Arizona State Sun Devils – Game summary

Quarter	1	2	3	4	Total
#11 UCLA	6	21	21	14	62
#15 Arizona State	10	7	10	0	27

at Sun Devil Stadium, Tempe, AZ

- Date: September 25, 2014
- TV announcers (FS1): Tim Brando (Play-by-play), Joel Klatt (Color), & Jenny Taft (Sideline)
- Boxscore

Game information

First quarter

- ASU – Zane Gonzalez 49-yard field goal
- UCLA – Kaʻimi Fairbairn 36-yard field goal
- ASU – Kody Kohl 5-yard pass from Mike Bercovici (Gonzalez kick)
- UCLA – Kaʻimi Fairbairn 24-yard field goal

Second quarter

- ASU – Cameron Smith 29-yard pass from Bercovici (Gonzalez kick)
- UCLA – Eldridge Massington 80-yard pass from Brett Hundley (Fairbairn kick)
- UCLA – Nate Iese 3-yard pass from Hundley (Fairbairn kick)
- UCLA – Ishmael Adams 95-yard interception return (Fairbairn kick)

Third quarter

- UCLA – Jordan Payton 80-yard pass from Hundley (Fairbairn kick)
- ASU – Zane Gonzalez 24-yard field goal
- UCLA – Adams 100-yard kickoff return (Fairbairn kick)
- UCLA – Nate Starks 1-yard run (Fairbairn kick)
- ASU – Ellis Jefferson 5-yard pass from Bercovici (Gonzalez kick)

Fourth quarter

- UCLA – Payton 4-yard pass from Hundley (Fairbairn kick)
- UCLA – Hundley 1-yard Run (Fairbairn kick)

Top passers

- UCLA – Brett Hundley, 18/23, 355 yards, 4 TD
- ASU – Mike Bercovici, 42/68, 488 yards, 3 TD, 2 INT

Top rushers

- UCLA – Paul Perkins, 14/137 yards
- ASU – Deantre Lewis, 9/46 yards

Top receivers

- UCLA – Jordan Payton, 5/151 yards, 2 TD
- ASU – Jaelen Strong, 12/146 yards

Top tacklers

- UCLA – Jaleel Wadood, 10 tackles
- ASU- Damarious Randall, 11 tackles

After winning their first three games against non-ranked teams by a combined 18 points, UCLA routed the No. 15 Arizona State Sun Devils 62–27. Hundley returned from an arm injury the prior week to complete 18 of 23 passes for 355 yards and four touchdowns, and Adams scored two touchdowns with a 95-yard interception return and a 100-yard kickoff return. The game was a matchup of the past two Pac-12 South champions.

Hundley's availability for the game was a game-time decision by Mora. Arizona State held a 17–6 lead before the Bruins scored 28 unanswered points. Eldridge Massington turned a short pass into an 80-yard touchdown to cut the deficit to 17–13. The Sun Devils were driving for a tying or go-ahead score before halftime when Adams returned an interception for a 27–17 lead. Hundley opened the second half with an 80-yard touchdown pass to Payton on the first play.

Hundley also ran for 72 yards, including the Bruins' final touchdown. UCLA finished with 62 points, the most ever scored in the 55-year-history of Sun Devil Stadium. They had 580 total yards on offense, while their defense forced four turnovers that led to 17 Bruins points. However, Arizona State gained 626 yards on 105 plays. Sun Devils quarterback Mike Bercovici, who replaced injured starter Taylor Kelly, passed for 488 yards and three touchdowns in his first start while setting school records in completions (42) and attempts (68).

=== Utah ===
Utah Utes vs #8 UCLA Bruins – Game summary

Quarter	1	2	3	4	Total
Utah	7	10	7	6	30
#8 UCLA	0	7	7	14	28

at Rose Bowl, Pasadena, CA

- Date: October 4, 2014
- TV announcers (ESPN): Mark Jones (Play-by-play), Rod Gilmore (Color), & Jessica Mendoza (Sideline)
- Boxscore

Game information

First quarter

- Utah: Tevin Carter 27-yard interception return (Andy Phillips kick)

Second quarter

- Utah: Dres Anderson 42-yard pass from Kendal Thompson (Phillips kick)
- UCLA: Paul Perkins 4-yard run (Kaʻimi Fairbairn kick)
- Utah: Andy Phillips 48-yard field goal

Third quarter

- UCLA: Eddie Vanderdoes 1-yard run (Fairbairn kick)
- Utah: Devontae Booker 6-yard run (Phillips Kick)

Fourth quarter

- UCLA: Devin Fuller 93-yard pass from Brett Hundley (Fairbairn kick)
- Utah: Andy Phillips 45-yard field goal
- UCLA: Eldridge Massington 40-yard pass from Hundley (Fairbairn kick)
- Utah: Andy Phillips 29-yard field goal

Top passers

- Utah: Kendal Thompson, 10/13, 95 yards, 1 TD
- UCLA: Brett Hundley, 16/21, 269 yards, 2 TD, 1 INT

Top rushers

- Utah: Devontae Booker 33/156 yards, 1 TD
- UCLA: Paul Perkins, 17/99 yards, 1 TD

Top receivers

- Utah: Kaelin Clay, 5/38 yards
- UCLA: Devin Fuller, 3/95 yards, 1 TD

Top tacklers

- Utah – Nate Orchard, 8.5 tackles
- UCLA – Eric Kendricks, 9 tackles

The Utah Utes' Andy Phillips kicked a game-winning 29-yard field goal with 34 seconds left in the game for a 30–28 upset over No. 8 UCLA. The Utes hung on as Fairbairn missed two field goal attempts of 55 and 50 yards, respectively, with no time remaining. Hundley was sacked 10 times, and the Bruins trailed for most of the game. Their offense gained 406 yards, but could not develop any consistency. UCLA was the fifth team in the top eight of the AP Poll to lose during the week, the first time in the poll's history since it began in 1936.

Utah led 7–0 after Tevin Carter intercepted a Hundley screen pass intended for Perkins, and returned it for a 27-yard touchdown with 5:51 remaining in the first quarter. Kendal Thompson replaced Utah starting quarterback Travis Wilson after two offensive series. He completed all seven of his passes in the first half, and his running helped the Utes to a 17–7 lead at halftime. Hundley struggled through the first three quarters with just 21 passes for 105 yards and no touchdowns, as the Bruins were playing without left guard Alex Redmond. The quarterback rallied UCLA with long TD passes of 93 yards to Devin Fuller and 40 yards to Massington, and the Bruins led 28–27 with five minutes remaining. However, Utah ran 4:16 off the clock before Phillips' kick with a 10-play, 63-yard drive behind the rushing of Thompson and Devontae Booker, who had 40 yards on the drive and 156 yards in the game. Hundley then drove UCLA to the Utah 37, when Fairbairn initially missed a 55-yard attempt. However, the Utes were penalized for running into the kicker, providing Fairbairn a chance at a 50-yard field goal, which missed just wide right.

Hundley threw for 269 yards, and Perkins ran for 99, including UCLA's first touchdown in the second quarter. Thompson passed for 95 yards and ran for 83 for the Utes. Utah ran for 242 of their 342 total yards. Hundey's 93-yard strike to Fuller was the second-longest play from scrimmage in Bruins history. With 107 sacks in 32 career games, Hundley's sack total was the highest among active Football Bowl Subdivision quarterbacks.

=== Oregon ===
#12 Oregon Ducks vs #18 UCLA Bruins – Game summary

Quarter	1	2	3	4	Total
#12 Oregon	8	13	14	7	42
#18 UCLA	0	10	0	20	30

at Rose Bowl, Pasadena, CA

- Date: October 11, 2014
- TV announcers (FOX): Gus Johnson (Play-by-play), Charles Davis, & Molly McGrath (Sideline)
- Boxscore

Game information

First quarter

- ORE – Marcus Mariota 13-yard run (Taylor Alie Run for Two-Point Conversion)

Second quarter

- UCLA – Kaʻimi Fairbairn 20-yard field goal
- ORE – Thomas Tyner 21-yard pass from Mariota (Matt Wogan Kick)
- ORE – Pharaoh Brown 31-yard pass from Mariota (Wogan Kick Missed)
- UCLA – Brett Hundley 16-yard run (Fairbairn Kick)

Third quarter

- ORE – Mariota 23-yard run (Wogan Kick)
- ORE – Royce Freeman 4-yard run (Wogan Kick)

Fourth quarter

- ORE – Freeman 2-yard run (Wogan Kick)
- UCLA – Jordan Payton 5-yard pass from Hundley (Miles Jack Run for Two-Point Conversion)
- UCLA – Nate Starks 9-yard run (Two-Point Attempt Failed)
- UCLA – Payton 25-yard pass from Hundley (Two-Point Attempt Failed)

Top Performers
Passing

- ORE – Marcus Mariota, 17/27, 210 yards, 2 TD
- UCLA – Brett Hundley, 26/37, 216 yards, 2 TD, INT

Running

- ORE – Royce Freeman, 18 carries, 121 yards, 2 TD
- UCLA – Paul Perkins, 21 carries, 187 yards

Receiving

- ORE – Pharoah Brown, 5 receptions, 84 yards, TD
- UCLA – Jordan Payton, 6 receptions, 61 yards, 2 TD

Top tacklers

- ORE – Erick Dargan, 10.5 tackles
- UCLA – Tahaan Goodman, 7.5 tackles

The Bruins suffered back-to-back defeats after losing 42–30 to the Oregon Ducks. UCLA scored three touchdowns in the fourth quarter after Oregon had built a 42–10 lead. It was their seventh consecutive loss to the Ducks, and likely dropped the Bruins out of the national title race. UCLA allowed 468 yards, including 258 rushing, and Ducks quarterback Marcus Mariota passed for two touchdown and ran for two others.

Oregon went ahead 8–0 after Hundley lost a fumble after being sacked in the first quarter, leading to a Mariota 13-yard TD run and a successful two-point conversion. UCLA went on an 83-yard drive, but had to settle for a field goal. The Ducks' second TD came on a 21-yard screen pass from Mariota to Thomas Tyner, prompting an animated sideline exchange between Mora and defensive coordinator Jeff Ulbrich. A 16-yard scoring run by Hundley with 3 seconds left in the first half cut the Ducks lead to 21–10. On Oregon's first possession of the second half, Mariota dropped the ball, but it bounced back to him and he ran for a 23-yard TD. Shortly thereafter, a Hundley interception was returned to the UCLA 10, setting up the first of Royce Freeman's two touchdown runs for a 35–10 lead. The Ducks expanded the margin to 42–10 in the opening minute of the final quarter with another score by Freeman.

UCLA's offense gained 553 yards. Perkins ran for 187 yards, and Hundley passed for 216 yards with two touchdowns passing and one running. Payton caught two fourth-quarter TDs. Mariota completed 17 of 27 passes for 210 yards, and added 75 yards rushing; the Bruins did not sack him after he suffered 12 in his previous two games. Freeman also ran for 121 yards for the Ducks.

=== California ===
UCLA Bruins vs. California Golden Bears – Game summary

Quarter	1	2	3	4	Total
UCLA	7	17	9	3	36
California	0	14	14	6	34

at California Memorial Stadium, Berkeley, CA

- Date: October 18, 2014
- Referee: Michael Mothershed
- TV announcers (ABC/ESPN2): Bob Wischusen (Play-by-play, Matt Millen (Color), & Quint Kessenich (Sideline)
- Boxscore

Game information

First quarter

- UCLA – Paul Perkins 16-yard pass from Brett Hundley (Kaʻimi Fairbairn kick)

Second quarter

- CAL – Daniel Lasco 3-yard run (James Langford kick)
- UCLA – Fairbairn 38-yard field goal
- Cal – Chris Harper 7-yard pass from Luke Rubenzer (Langford kick)
- UCLA – Jordan James 11-yard run (Fairbairn kick)
- UCLA – Perkins 49-yard pass from Hundley (Fairbairn kick)

Third quarter

- CAL – Lasco 2-yard run (James Langford kick)
- UCLA – Fairbairn 24-yard field goal
- CAL – Trevor Davis 24-yard pass from Jared Goff (Langford kick)
- UCLA – Hundley 15-yard run (Hundley pass fail)

Fourth quarter

- CAL – Kenny Lawler 23-yard pass from Goff (Goff run fail)
- UCLA – Fairbairn 26-yard field goal

Top passers

- UCLA – Brett Hundley, 31/42, 330 yards, 2 TDs, 1 INT
- CAL – Jared Goff, 25/41, 303 yards, 2 TDs, 1 INT

Top rushers

- UCLA – Brett Hundley, 17/94 yards, 1 TD
- CAL – Daniel Lasco, 19/44 yards

Top receivers

- UCLA – Paul Perkins, 4/75 yards, 2 TD
- CAL – Kenny Lawler, 3/88 yards, 1 TD

Top tacklers

- UCLA – Anthony Jefferson, 7 tackles
- CAL – Stefan McClure, 7.5 tackles

Fairbairn gave the Bruins the lead with a field goal with 3:40 left in the game, and defensive back Marcus Rios made a game-saving interception with 51 seconds remaining for a 36–34 win over the California Golden Bears. The win was UCLA's first at Cal since 1998, ending a seven-game losing streak at Memorial Stadium. Hundley threw for 330 yards and two touchdowns and ran for another score, but lost a fumble and threw an interception. The Golden Bears converted the Bruins' three turnovers into 21 points.

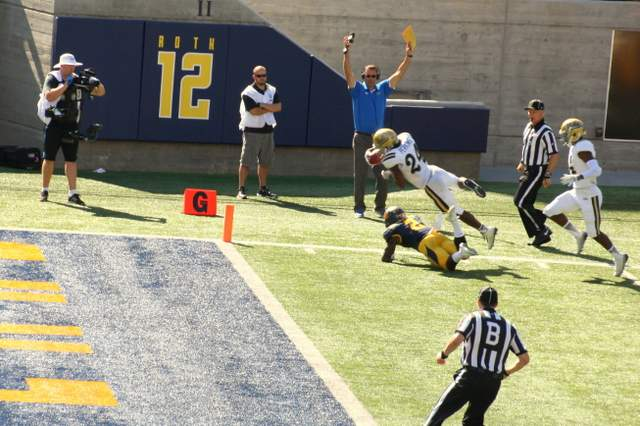
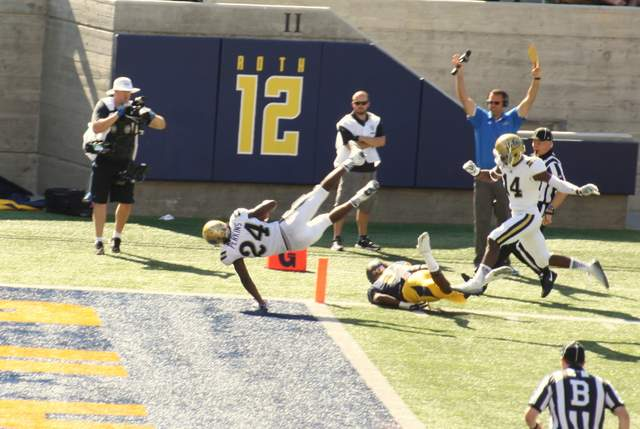
Paul Perkins dives (left) and crosses the end zone (right) for UCLA score vs. Cal

UCLA moved the ball against Cal's defense, gaining 567 yards and punting just three times on 15 possessions. They led 24–14 at the half, with Cal staying close due to fumbles by Hundley and Perkins. The Bears held UCLA on fourth-and-inches at midfield to start the third quarter, and scored a touchdown three plays later to pull closer at 24–21. The Bruins were leading 33–28 in the fourth with the ball in Bears' territory when Hundley threw behind receiver Jordan Payton and was intercepted by Cameron Walker, who returned the ball to the UCLA 32. Cal's Jared Goff followed with a 23-yard TD to Kenny Lawler with seven minutes to go for a 34–33 lead. The Bruins responded with Hundley leading a drive that led to Fairbairn's third field goal, a 26-yarder to recapture the lead, 36–34. The Bears comeback ended when Goff's deep sideline pass was picked off by Rios at the UCLA 2.

Hundley had 424 yards of total offense, and Perkins had 2 TD catches. Goff had 303 passing yards and two touchdowns for the Bears. Rios entered the game after cornerback Fabian Moreau left with an injury.

=== Colorado ===
#25 UCLA Bruins vs. Colorado Buffaloes – Game summary

Quarter	1	2	3	4	OT	2OT	Total
#25 UCLA	17	7	7	0	3	6	40
Colorado	0	14	0	17	3	3	37

at Folsom Field, Boulder, CO

- Date: October 25, 2014
- TV announcers (P12N): Kevin Calabro (Play-by-play), Yogi Roth (Color), & Lewis Johnson (Sideline)
- Boxscore

Game information

First quarter

- UCLA – Paul Perkins 92-yard run (Kaʻimi Fairbairn kick)
- UCLA – Jordan Payton 20-yard pass from Brett Hundley (Fairbairn Kick)
- UCLA – Fairbairn 31-yard Field Goal

Second quarter

- COLO – Tony Jones 1-yard run (Will Oliver kick)
- UCLA – Perkins 24-yard run (Fairbairn kick)
- COLO – Michael Adkins II 17-yard run (Oliver kick)

Third quarter

- UCLA – Myles Jack 3-yard run (Fairbairn kick)

Fourth quarter

- COLO – Bryce Bobo 38-yard pass from Sefo Liufau (Oliver kick)
- COLO – Bobo 3-yard pass from Liufau (Oliver kick)
- COLO – Oliver 35-yard Field Goal

Overtime

- UCLA – Fairbairn 28-yard Field Goal
- COLO – Oliver 38-yard Field Goal

2nd Overtime

- COLO – Oliver 34 Yd Field Goal
- UCLA – Hundley 8-yard run

Top passers

- UCLA – Brett Hundley, 24/39, 200 yards, 1 TD
- COLO – Sefo Liufau, 27/45, 246 yards, 2 TD, 2 INT

Top rushers

- UCLA – Paul Perkins, 19/180 yards, 2 TD
- COLO – Michael Adkins II, 17/107 yards, 1 TD

Top receivers

- UCLA – Jordan Payton, 5/65 yards, 1 TD
- COLO – Nelson Spruce, 6/63 yards

Top tacklers

- UCLA – Eric Kendricks, 16 tackles
- COLO – Brady Daigh, 11 tackles

The Bruins won 40–37 over the Colorado Buffaloes in double overtime after Hundley ran 8 yards on the winning touchdown. UCLA (6–2 overall, 3–2 in the Pac-12) had surrendered a 17-point lead in the fourth quarter after Buffaloes kicker Will Oliver tied the game with a 35-yard field goal with 36 seconds left in regulation. Colorado (2–6, 0–5) had lost 28 of 32 conference games since they joined the Pac-12 in 2011.

On the Bruins' first play, Perkins ran for a 92-yard touchdown for the second-longest run in school history, and the team jumped to a 17–0 first-quarter lead. Leading 24–7, UCLA had back-to-back interceptions by Adams and Jack erased by penalties, extending a touchdown drive for Colorado that made it 24–14. Hundley fumbled the ball deep in Bruins territory and the Buffaloes were at the UCLA 4 with 24 seconds left in the first half. However, Colorado mismanaged the clock and time expired without another play. After a 3-yard touchdown run by Jack, the Bruins ended the third quarter ahead 31–14 before Colorado scored 17 unanswered points. The teams exchanged field goals in the first overtime, and Oliver put the Buffaloes ahead 37–34 with another kick in the second overtime. However, Hundley took over with a 17-yard run followed by a run through a huge hole for his game-winning score.

Perkins finished with 180 yards rushing and two touchdowns. Hundley added 110 on the ground; he was not as sharp passing, missing receivers throughout the game while completing 24 of 39 for 200 yards and one touchdown. UCLA gained 509 yards on offense, rushing for 309. Colorado had 500 yards, 233 on the ground.

=== Arizona ===
#25 UCLA Bruins vs. #14 Arizona Wildcats – Game summary

Quarter	1	2	3	4	Total
#14 Arizona	7	0	0	0	7
#25 UCLA	0	3	14	0	17

at Rose Bowl, Pasadena, CA

- Date: November 1, 2014
- TV announcers (ESPN): Mark Jones (Play-by-play), Rod Gilmore (Color), & Jessica Mendoza (Sideline)
- Boxscore

Game information

First quarter

- ARIZ – Cayleb Jones 14-yard pass from Anu Solomon (Casey Skowron kick)

Second quarter

- UCLA – Kaʻimi Fairbairn 24-yard field goal

Third quarter

- UCLA – Paul Perkins 5-yard run (Fairbairn kick)
- UCLA – Jordan Payton 70-yard pass from Brett Hundley (Fairbairn kick)

Top passers

- ARIZ – Anu Solomon, 18/48, 175 yards, 1 TD, 1 INT
- UCLA – Brett Hundley, 19/26, 189 yards, 1 TD

Top rushers

- ARIZ – Terris Jones-Grigsby, 11/50 yards
- UCLA – Brett Hundley, 24/131 yards

Top receivers

- ARIZ – Trey Griffey, 4/48 yards
- UCLA – Jordan Payton, 6/119 yards, 1 TD

Top tacklers

- ARIZ – Scooby Wright III, 15 tackles
- UCLA – Eddie Vanderdoes, 8 tackles

UCLA won 17–7 over the No. 14 Arizona Wildcats, who were held to 255 yards in total offense—287 below their season average. Hundley produced 320 yards in total offense with 189 yards passing and 131 rushing. The win kept the Bruins tied for second place in the South Division of the Pac-12 behind Arizona State, and they remained in contention for the conference championship game.

The Wildcats took a 7–0 lead on their opening drive of the game, aided by two 15-yard penalties by Jack that negated third-down stops by the Bruins. Anu Solomon hit Cayleb Jones for a 14-yard score, the only TD of the first half. Fairbairn made a 34-yard field goal in the second quarter after UCLA failed to score from the Arizona 1. Earlier in the game, he missed a field goal attempt, the first time the Bruins failed to score inside the red zone during the season after 30 tries. UCLA took the lead after a 5-yard run by Perkins capped 12-play drive. On their next possession, Hundley hit Payton in stride for a 70-yard score down the UCLA sideline.

Hundley ran for 100 yards for the second consecutive game. Perkins rushed for 78 yards, and became the 13th Bruin with a 1,000 yard rushing season. UCLA committed 11 penalties for 118 yards, including five holding penalties that impeded the offense. Arizona's Solomon was just 18-for-48 passing for 175 yards.

=== Washington ===
#18 UCLA Bruins vs. Washington Huskies – Game summary

Quarter	1	2	3	4	Total
#18 UCLA	14	17	10	3	44
WASH	3	7	10	10	30

at Husky Stadium, Seattle, WA

- Date: November 8, 2014
- TV announcers (FS1): Tim Brando (Play-by-play) & Brady Quinn (Color)
- Boxscore

Game information

First quarter

- UCLA – Brett Hundley 4-yard run (Kaʻimi Fairbairn kick)
- UCLA – Kenneth Walker 57-yard pass from Hundley (Fairbairn kick)
- WASH – Cameron Van Winkle 20-yard Field Goal

Second quarter

- WASH – Cyler Miles 6-yard run (Van Winkle kick)
- UCLA – Hundley 6-yard run (Fairbairn kick)
- UCLA – Myles Jack 28-yard run (Fairbairn kick)
- UCLA – Fairbairn 30 Yd Field Goal

Third quarter

- WASH – Van Winkle 47 Yd Field Goal
- UCLA – Mossi Johnson 15-yard pass from Hundley (Fairbairn kick)
- WASH – John Ross 100-yard Kickoff Return (Van Winkle kick)
- UCLA – Fairbairn 37 Yd Field Goal

Fourth quarter

- WASH – Dwayne Washington 12-yard run (Van Winkle kick)
- UCLA – Fairbairn 46 Yd Field Goal
- WASH – Van Winkle 38 Yd Field Goal

Top passers

- UCLA – Brett Hundley, 29/36, 302 yards, 2 TD
- WASH – Cyler Miles, 14/24, 155 yards, 1 INT

Top rushers

- UCLA – Paul Perkins, 19/98 yards
- WASH – Shaq Thompson 16/100 yards

Top receivers

- UCLA – Kenneth Walker, 2/65 yards, 1 TD
- WASH – Joshua Perkins 4/49 yards

Top tacklers

- UCLA – Eric Kendricks, 13 tackles
- WASH – Kevin King, 10 tackles

UCLA defeated the Washington Huskies 44–30 after scoring a season-high 31 points in the first half. Hundley threw two touchdown passes and become the Bruins' career leader, and he also ran for two other touchdowns.

Hundley threw his 69th career TD, passing Cade McNown for the school record, on a 57-yard pass to Kenneth Walker III that gave the Bruins a 14–0 lead in the first quarter. Washington pulled to within 14–10, before UCLA scored on its last three possessions of the half—highlighted by a 28-yard TD run by Jack—to lead 31–10 at halftime. The Huskies did not manage to get closer than 14 points the rest of the game. Mora called it "probably as complete a game we have played from start to finish this year."

Hundley was 29-of-36 for 302 yards, and Perkins rushed for 98. UCLA finished the season 6–0 on the road, and won their ninth consecutive game away from the Rose Bowl.

=== USC ===
#24 USC Trojans vs. #11 UCLA Bruins – Game summary

Quarter	1	2	3	4	Total
#24 USC	7	7	0	6	20
#11 UCLA	14	10	14	0	38

at Rose Bowl, Pasadena, CA

- Date: November 22, 2014
- TV announcers (ABC): Brad Nessler (Play-by-play), Todd Blackledge (Color), & Holly Rowe (Sideline)
- Boxscore

Game information

First quarter

- USC – Anthony Sarao 17-yard interception return (Andre Heidari kick)
- UCLA – Devin Lucien 10-yard pass from Brett Hundley (Kaʻimi Fairbairn kick)
- UCLA – Thomas Duarte 57-yard pass from Hundley (Fairbairn kick)

Second quarter

- USC – Justin Davis 2-yard pass from Cody Kessler (Heidari kick)
- UCLA – Fairbairn 32-yard field goal
- UCLA – Eldridge Massington 13-yard pass from Hundley (Fairbairn kick)

Third quarter

- UCLA – Paul Perkins 10-yard run (Fairbairn kick)
- UCLA – Hundley 15-yard run (Fairbairn kick)

Fourth quarter

- USC – Javorius Allen 3-yard run (Two-Point Pass Conversion Failed)

Top passers

- USC – Cody Kessler, 22/34, 214 yards, 1 TD, 1 INT
- UCLA – Brett Hundley, 22/31, 326 yards, 3 TD, 1 INT

Top rushers

- USC – Javorius Allen, 14/60 yards, 1 TD
- UCLA – Paul Perkins, 24/93 yards, 1 TD

Top receivers

- USC – JuJu Smith, 4/79 yards
- UCLA – Thomas Duarte, 2/95 yards, 1 TD

Top tacklers

- USC – Hayes Pullard, 9 tackles
- UCLA – Eric Kendricks, 14 tackles

The Bruins defeated the No. 24 USC Trojans 38–20 for their third-straight victory over their crosstown rivals. The win put the Bruins in position to capture the Pac-12 South title with a victory the following week. Brett Hundley passed for 326 yards and three touchdowns and ran for another TD, while UCLA's defense held the Trojans to only 200 yards and seven points through the first three quarters. Hundley remained undefeated in three career starts against USC, giving the Bruins their first three-game winning streak in the series since 1998. The margin of victory was UCLA's largest over USC since a 45–25 win in 1986.

USC led 7–0 three minutes into the game after Anthony Sarao intercepted Hundley and returned it 17 yards for a touchdown. After the Trojans' Nelson Agholor fumbled a punt at the USC 10, a wide-open Devin Lucien caught a touchdown to even the score from the Bruins. UCLA scored again 39 seconds later when Duarte turned a mid-range pass from Hundley into a 57-yard TD. After USC tied the game at 14, Eric Kendricks intercepted a tipped pass from Cody Kessler, which Hundley converted into a 68-yard TD drive for a 24–14 lead before the half ended. Paul Perkins scored from 10 yards out to cap an 84-yard drive to start the second half, and Hundley ran 15-yards up the middle midway through the third quarter for the Bruins' final score. With the game in hand for the Bruins, the Trojans gained 91 of their 276 total yards in the game on a meaningless TD drive.

Hundley became UCLA's career leader in total offense after passing Cade McNown's record of 11,285. Perkins ran 24 times for 93 yards to overtake USC's Javorius Allen, who was held to 60 yards, for the conference lead in rushing yards. UCLA scored at least 35 points in three consecutive games against USC for the first time in its rivalry. Under coach Jim Mora and Hundley, UCLA has beaten USC by a combined score of 111–62 over the last three years. The Bruins had a season-high six sacks, and Kessler was limited to 22 of 34 passing for 214 yards.

=== Stanford ===
Stanford Cardinal vs. No. 9 UCLA Bruins

Quarter	1	2	3	4	Total
Stanford	7	14	7	3	31
#9 UCLA	7	3	0	0	10

at Rose Bowl, Pasadena, CA

- Date: November 28, 2014
- TV announcers (ABC): Sean McDonough (Play-by-play), Chris Spielman (Color), & Todd McShay (Sideline)
- Boxscore

Game information

First quarter

Second quarter

Third quarter

Fourth quarter

Top passers

Top rushers

Top receivers

Top tacklers

UCLA (9–3, 6–3) lost 31–10 at home to the Stanford Cardinal (7–5, 5–4), who defeated the Bruins for the seventh consecutive time. UCLA, which had an outside shot at a College Football Playoff berth, would have clinched the South Division and qualified for the Pac-12 Championship Game with a victory. Hundley was sacked four times while throwing for just 146 yards. The Bruins were shut out for the final 41 minutes of the game.

UCLA led 7–0 after Hundley connected with Duarte for a score on their opening drive. However, Stanford's Kevin Hogan was 14 for 15 for 189 yards and two TDs in the first half to lead the Cardinal to a 21–10 halftime lead. After Stanford scored on their first possession of the second half, they proceeded to control the clock. Stanford outgained UCLA in yardage 436–262 and had possession of the ball for almost 38 minutes. Backup Jerry Neuheisel finished the game after Hundley exited in the middle of the fourth quarter with an injured throwing hand.

UCLA entered the game No. 8 in the College Football Playoff ranking, and could have faced No. 2 Oregon in the conference championship. The Bruins' 10 points were their fewest since being held to 10 by Stanford the prior season.

=== Kansas State (Alamo Bowl) ===
#11 Kansas State Wildcats vs. #14 UCLA Bruins

Quarter	1	2	3	4	Total
#11 Kansas State	0	6	15	14	35
#14 UCLA	17	14	3	6	40

at Alamodome, San Antonio, TX

- Date: January 2, 2015
- TV announcers (ESPN/ESPN Radio): Joe Tessitore (play-by-play), Brock Huard (analyst), & Shannon Spake (sideline)/Bob Wischusen (play-by-play), Matt Millen (analyst), & Quint Kessenich (sideline)
- Boxscore

Game information

First quarter

Second quarter

Third quarter

Fourth quarter

Top passers

Top rushers

Top receivers

Top tacklers

UCLA jumped to a large halftime lead and held on for a 40–35 win over the No. 11 Kansas State Wildcats in the Alamo Bowl. Perkins scored on a 67-yard run to give the Bruins a 40–28 lead with just over two minutes left in the game, and he helped recover an onside kick to seal the game after the Wildcats final score. He finished with a career-high 194 yards with two touchdowns, and was named the bowl's offensive most valuable player (MVP). UCLA ran for 331 yards, including 96 by Hundley. After making a team-high 10 tackles, including three for a loss, Kendricks was voted the game's defensive MVP. The win earned UCLA their second straight 10–3 season, and their first consecutive bowl victories since winning eight in a row from 1983 through 1991.

Hundley ran for two touchdowns in the first quarter, when he also completed nine of 11 passes for 85 yards. The Bruins led 31–6 at the half after holding Kansas State to just 87 total yards. However, the Wildcats rallied to score 15 straight points and controlled the ball for almost 13 minutes in the third quarter. They pulled to within 34–28 after a touchdown with five minutes remaining. The scoring drive was extended by two penalties by UCLA, who had 15 for an Alamo Bowl record 128 yards. UCLA responded with Perkins' touchdown run on a second-and-13 play, extending the lead to 40–28. The Wildcats came as close as 40–35 with 1:21 remaining after Tyler Lockett caught a 29-yard touchdown pass from Jake Waters, but the comeback ended after their failed onside attempt.

Hundley accounted for three touchdowns and threw for 136 yards, but completed only three of 13 passes after the first quarter. It was his 29th career win, one behind school-leader McNown. The UCLA defense had a season-high seven sacks after entering the contest averaging just 1.8 (22 in 12 games). Perkins finished the season as the Pac-12 rushing leader with 1,575 yards. Kendricks led the Football Bowl Subdivision with 149 solo tackles, and set the UCLA record for career tackles with 481, breaking the previous mark of 468 set by Jerry Robinson (1976–1978). Kansas State's Lockett had an Alamo Bowl record 13 receptions for 164 yards, and tied the bowl record with two TD receptions. His 249 all-purpose yards were also a bowl record. Waters was 31-of-48 passing for 338 yards, but was intercepted twice and lost a fumble.

Statistics	KSU	UCLA
First downs	27	16
Plays–yards	81–369	63–467
Rushes–yards	32–31	39–331
Passing yards	338	136
Passing: Comp–Att–Int	31–49–1	12–24–0
Time of possession	35:24	24:36

== Coaches ==
- Jim L. Mora, head coach
- Noel Mazzone, offensive coordinator/quarterbacks
- Adrian Klemm, associate head coach/running game coordinator/offensive line
- Jeff Ulbrich, defensive coordinator
- Kennedy Polamalu, running backs
- Mike Tuiasosopo, special teams, linebackers
- Demetrice Martin, assistant head coach/Passing game coordinator/defensive backs
- Eric Yarber, wide receivers
- Angus McClure, defensive line/recruiting coordinator
- Taylor Mazzone, quarterbacks coach
- Sal Alosi, coordinator of strength & conditioning

== Rankings ==
Ranking movements Legend: ██ Increase in ranking ██ Decrease in ranking RV = Received votes
	Week																
Poll	Pre	1	2	3	4	5	6	7	8	9	10	11	12	13	14	15	Final
AP	7	11	12	12	11	8	18	RV	25	25	18	14	11	9	16	14	10
Coaches	7	11	12	10	10	9	17	RV	RV	25	18	15	12	10	17	15	10
CFP	Not released									22	18	11	9	8	15	14	Not released

== Awards and honors ==
- September 1, 2014 – Linebacker Eric Kendricks named the Walter Camp National Player of the Week and Pac-12 Defensive Player of the week. Kendricks was also named the Nagurski Trophy National Defensive Player of the Week and the Lott IMPACT Trophy Player of the Week.
- September 15, 2014 – Quarterback Jerry Neuheisel and defensive back Ishmael Adams were named offensive and special teams Pac-12 Players of the Week respectively.
- September 29, 2014 – Brett Hundley and Ishmael Adams were named offensive and special teams Pac-12 Players of the Week; Adams was also named to the Paul Hornung Award Honor Roll and was the Athlon Sports National Defensive Player of the Week.
- September 30, 2014 – Eric Kendricks was named the Lott Impact Player of the Week.
- November 10, 2014 – Kaʻimi Fairbairn was named to the Pac-12 Conference Special Teams Player of the Week; Brett Hundley has been named a finalist for the Johnny Unitas Golden Arm Award; Myles Jack was named to the Paul Hornung Award Honor Roll after his performance this week.
- November 12, 2014 – Linebacker Eric Kendricks was named a semi-finalist for the Lott IMPACT Trophy.
- December 24, 2014 – Linebacker Eric Kendricks was named Pac-12 Defensive Player of the Week.
- November 25, 2014 – Jim Mora was named Bobby Dodd Trophy Coach of the Week.

Butkus Award

- Linebacker Eric Kendricks

Lott IMPACT Trophy

- Eric Kendricks

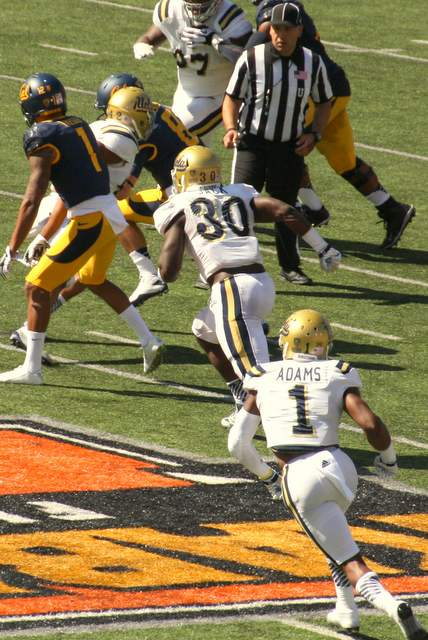
Defensive back Ismael Adams (No. 1) was named first-team All-Pac-12

Pac-12 All-Conference Teams:

- First team – Sophomore defensive back Ishmael Adams
- Second team – Junior QB Brett Hundley, Junior C Jake Brendel, Sophomore DL Kenny Clark, Senior DL Owamagbe Odighizuwa, Senior LB Eric Kendricks, Sophomore LB Myles Jack, Senior DB Anthony Jefferson, Junior DB Fabian Moreau.
- Honorable mention – Sophomore OL Caleb Benenoch, Sophomore WR Thomas Duarte, Senior LB Ryan Hofmeister (special teams), Junior WR Jordan Payton, Sophomore RB Paul Perkins, Sophomore OL Alex Redmond, Sophomore OL Scott Quessenberry, Sophomore DL Eddie Vanderdoes, Freshman DB Jaleel Wadood.

CoSIDA Academic All-District Football Team – District 8

- First team – OL Jake Brendel

Pac-12 All-Academic teams:

- First team – Redshirt junior center Jake Brendel (third straight season)
- Second team – Redshirt senior linebacker Eric Kendricks
- Honorable mention – Linebacker Ryan Hofmeister, fullback Taylor Lagace, long snapper Christopher Longo, quarterback/holder Jerry Neuheisel, defensive lineman Owa Odighizuwa, defensive back/special teams Jalen Ortiz, offensive lineman Scott Quessenberry.

== Notes ==
- December 2, 2013 – Running backs coach Steve Broussard was replaced by Kennedy Polamalu
- January 18, 2014 – Defensive coordinator Lou Spanos left the team to join the Tennessee Titans as linebackers coach
- February 5, 2014 – National Signing Day, first day when high school students can sign a NLI with UCLA
- November 22, 2014 – First time UCLA has had three home crowds of 80,000-plus in a single season at the Rose Bowl; wide receiver Sam Handler was standing firmly at midfield to prevent USC band's drum major from stabbing the UCLA logo; UCLA has won nine games for the third straight season, the first time in school history it has won nine in three consecutive years; The Bruins scored at least 35 points for the third straight game against USC, the first time they have accomplished that feat.
- November 28, 2014 – Retirement of Troy Aikman's No. 8 football jersey
- January 12, 2015 – Paul Perkins was named to the Top-10 Postseason Rushing Performance Leaders list for 2014 (20 rushes for 194 yards, 9.7 yards/carry, 2 Touchdowns, 67 yards was the longest for a touchdown).
