= 2015 Alamo Bowl =

2015 Valero Alamo Bowl
- 22nd Alamo Bowl
Kansas State Wildcats	UCLA Bruins
(9–3)	(9–3)
Big 12	Pac-12
35	40
Head coach: Bill Snyder	Head coach: Jim L. Mora
AP / Coaches / CFP; 11 / 10 / 11	AP / Coaches / CFP; 14 / 15 / 14
	1	2	3	4	Total
Kansas State	0	6	15	14	35
UCLA	17	14	3	6	40
- Date: January 2, 2015
- Season: 2014
- Stadium: Alamodome
- Location: San Antonio, Texas, U.S.
- MVP: Offense: Paul Perkins (RB, UCLA); Defense: Eric Kendricks (LB, UCLA); Sportsmanship: Tyler Lockett (WR, KSU)
- Favorite: UCLA by 1.5
- Referee: Jerry McGinn (Big Ten)
- Attendance: 60,517
- Payout: US$3 million per team

United States TV coverage
- Network: ESPN/ESPN Radio
- Announcers: Joe Tessitore, Brock Huard, & Shannon Spake (ESPN); Bob Wischusen, Matt Millen, Quint Kessenich (ESPN Radio)
- Nielsen ratings: TBD

The 2015 Alamo Bowl was an American college football bowl game played on January 2, 2015, at the Alamodome in San Antonio, Texas. The 22nd edition of the Alamo Bowl featured the Kansas State Wildcats from the Big 12 Conference and the UCLA Bruins from the Pac-12 Conference. It was televised at 5:45 p.m. CST on ESPN and heard on the ESPN Radio. It was one of the 2014–15 bowl games that conclude the 2014 FBS football season. The game was sponsored by the Valero Energy Corporation and was officially known as the Valero Alamo Bowl. The Bruins defeated the Wildcats, 40–35, and ended the season with 10 wins.

== Teams ==
This was the third overall meeting between these two teams, with the series standing tied, 1–1 before the game. The last time these two teams met was in 2010.

=== Kansas State ===
Kansas State entered the season ranked #20 in the preseason polls, and were predicted as one of the teams that could win the Big 12 Conference. After winning their first two games, the Wildcats lost to then 5th-ranked Auburn 20-14 to fall to 2-1. The Wildcats then won 5-straight games to improve to 7-1, including a 31-30 win over Oklahoma, and rose to #7 in the rankings. They would then lose 41-20 to TCU for their first loss of Conference play. After beating West Virginia and Kansas, Kansas State lost their season finale to Baylor 38-27 to finish 9-3, with a 7-2 conference record

=== UCLA ===
The UCLA Bruins were ranked No. 7 in preseason national polls, and were expected to contend for not only one of the four berths in the College Football Playoff, but also the national championship. They started the season 4–0, often struggling, before suffering consecutive home losses to the Utah Utes and Oregon Ducks. After dropping out of the polls, they re-emerged as playoff contenders with five straight wins. However, UCLA lost their final home game to the Stanford Cardinal. A win in the Alamo Bowl would give the Bruins their ninth 10-win season in school history, and it would be just the third time in their history that they have won 10 games in consecutive seasons.

== Game summary ==
No. 14 UCLA jumped to a large halftime lead and held on for a 40–35 win over No. 11 Kansas State. Paul Perkins scored on a 67-yard run to give the Bruins a 40–28 lead with just over two minutes left in the game, and he helped recover an onside kick to seal the game after the Wildcats final score. He finished with a career-high 194 yards with two touchdowns, and was named the bowl's offensive most valuable player (MVP). UCLA ran for 331 yards, including 96 by Brett Hundley. After making a team-high 10 tackles, including three for a loss, the Bruins' Eric Kendricks was voted the game's defensive MVP. The win earned UCLA their second straight 10–3 season, and their first consecutive bowl victories since winning eight in a row from 1983 through 1991.

UCLA's Hundley ran for two touchdowns in the first quarter, when he also completed nine of 11 passes for 85 yards. The Bruins led 31–6 at the half after holding Kansas State to just 87 total yards. However, the Wildcats rallied to score 15 straight points and controlled the ball for almost 13 minutes in the third quarter. They pulled to within 34–28 after a touchdown with five minutes remaining. The scoring drive was extended by two penalties by UCLA, who had 15 for an Alamo Bowl record 128 yards. UCLA responded with Perkins' touchdown run on a second-and-13 play, extending the lead to 40–28. The Wildcats came as close as 40–35 with 1:21 remaining after Tyler Lockett caught a 29-yard touchdown pass from Jake Waters, but the comeback ended after their failed onside attempt.

Hundley accounted for three touchdowns and threw for 136 yards, but completed only three of 13 passes after the first quarter. The UCLA defense had a season-high seven sacks after entering the contest averaging just 1.8 (22 in 12 games). Perkins finished the season as the Pac-12 rushing leader with 1,575 yards. Kendricks led the Football Bowl Subdivision with 149 solo tackles. Kansas State's Lockett had an Alamo Bowl record 13 receptions for 164 yards, and tied the bowl record with two TD receptions. His 249 all-purpose yards were also a bowl record. Waters was 31-of-48 passing for 338 yards, but was intercepted twice and lost a fumble.

=== Scoring summary ===
Scoring summary

Quarter	Time	Drive			Team	Scoring information	Score	
Quarter	Time	Plays	Yards	TOP	Team	Scoring information	KSU	UCLA
1	12:47	6	77	2:13	UCLA	Brett Hundley 10-yard touchdown run, Kaʻimi Fairbairn kick good	0	7
1	8:03	10	50	3:35	UCLA	27-yard field goal by Kaʻimi Fairbairn	0	10
1	1:25	10	71	4:27	UCLA	Brett Hundley 28-yard touchdown run, Kaʻimi Fairbairn kick good	0	17
2	12:06	8	48	4:19	KSU	47-yard field goal by Matthew McCrane	3	17
2	10:05	4	3	0:56	KSU	29-yard field goal by Matthew McCrane	6	17
2	7:29	3	44	0:27	UCLA	Paul Perkins 32-yard touchdown run, Kaʻimi Fairbairn kick good	6	24
2	0:19	4	51	1:02	UCLA	Devin Lucien 7-yard touchdown reception from Brett Hundley, Kaʻimi Fairbairn kick good	6	31
3	7:23	17	75	7:37	KSU	Tyler Lockett 3-yard touchdown reception from Jake Waters, 2-point pass good	14	31
3	3:25	6	21	3:31	KSU	DeMarcus Robinson 1-yard touchdown run, Matthew McCrane kick good	21	31
3	0:33	7	39	2:52	UCLA	44-yard field goal by Kaʻimi Fairbairn	21	34
4	4:54	15	91	6:19	KSU	Jake Waters 1-yard touchdown run, Matthew McCrane kick good	28	34
4	2:20	5	76	2:34	UCLA	Paul Perkins 67-yard touchdown run, 2-point pass failed	28	40
4	1:21	4	90	0:59	KSU	Tyler Lockett 29-yard touchdown reception from Jake Waters, Matthew McCrane kick good	35	40
"TOP" = time of possession. For other American football terms, see Glossary of American football.							35	40

=== Statistics ===
Statistics	KSU	UCLA
First downs	27	16
Plays–yards	81–369	63–467
Rushes–yards	32–31	39–331
Passing yards	338	136
Passing: Comp–Att–Int	31–49–1	12–24–0
Time of possession	35:24	24:36
