= 2014 Kansas State Wildcats football team =

American college football season

2014 Kansas State Wildcats football

Alamo Bowl, L 35–40 vs. UCLA
- Conference: Big 12 Conference

Ranking
- Coaches: No. 18
- AP: No. 18
- Record: 9–4 (7–2 Big 12)
- Head coach: Bill Snyder (23rd season)
- Co-offensive coordinators: Dana Dimel (8th season); Del Miller (15th season)
- Offensive scheme: Multiple
- Defensive coordinator: Tom Hayes (3rd season)
- Base defense: 4–3
- Home stadium: Bill Snyder Family Football Stadium

2014 Big 12 Conference football standings
	Conf.				Overall
Team	W		L		W		L
No. 7 Baylor +	8	–	1		11	–	2
No. 3 TCU	–	8	–	1	12	–	1
No. 18 Kansas State	7	–	2		9	–	4
Oklahoma	5	–	4		8	–	5
West Virginia	5	–	4		7	–	6
Texas	5	–	4		6	–	7
Oklahoma State	4	–	5		7	–	6
Texas Tech	2	–	7		4	–	8
Kansas	1	–	8		3	–	9
Iowa State	0	–	9		2	–	10
Rankings from AP Poll

The 2014 Kansas State Wildcats football team represented Kansas State University in the 2014 NCAA Division I FBS football season. The Wildcats played their home games at Bill Snyder Family Football Stadium, in Manhattan, Kansas, as they have done since 1968. 2014 was the 119th season in school history. The Wildcats were led by head coach Bill Snyder in his 23rd overall and sixth straight season since taking over for his second tenure in 2009. Kansas State was a member of the Big 12 Conference. They finished the season 9–4, 7–2 in Big 12 play to finish in third place. They were invited to the Alamo Bowl where they lost to UCLA.

== Schedule ==
Date	Time	Opponent	Rank	Site	TV	Result	Attendance
August 30	6:10 p.m.	Stephen F. Austin*	No. 20	Bill Snyder Family Football Stadium; Manhattan, KS	K-StateHD.TV	W 55–16	52,830
September 6	11:00 a.m.	at Iowa State	No. 20	Jack Trice Stadium; Ames, IA (rivalry)	FS1	W 32–28	54,800
September 18	6:30 p.m.	No. 5 Auburn*	No. 20	Bill Snyder Family Football Stadium; Manhattan, KS	ESPN	L 14–20	53,046
September 27	11:00 a.m.	UTEP*	No. 25	Bill Snyder Family Football Stadium; Manhattan, KS	FSN	W 58–28	52,899
October 4	6:00 p.m.	Texas Tech	No. 23	Bill Snyder Family Football Stadium; Manhattan, KS	ESPNU	W 45–13	52,726
October 18	11:00 a.m.	at No. 11 Oklahoma	No. 14	Gaylord Family Oklahoma Memorial Stadium; Norman, OK	ESPN	W 31–30	85,019
October 25	11:00 a.m.	Texas^{†}	No. 11	Bill Snyder Family Football Stadium; Manhattan, KS	ESPN	W 23–0	52,879
November 1	7:00 p.m.	Oklahoma State	No. 9	Bill Snyder Family Football Stadium; Manhattan, KS	ABC	W 48–14	53,746
November 8	6:30 p.m.	at No. 6 TCU	No. 7	Amon G. Carter Stadium; Fort Worth, TX	FOX	L 20–41	48,012
November 20	6:00 p.m.	at West Virginia	No. 12	Mountaineer Field at Milan Puskar Stadium; Morgantown, WV	FS1	W 26–20	47,683
November 29	3:00 p.m.	Kansas	No. 12	Bill Snyder Family Football Stadium; Manhattan, KS (rivalry)	FS1	W 51–13	53,439
December 6	6:45 p.m.	at No. 5 Baylor	No. 9	McLane Stadium; Waco, TX (College GameDay)	ESPN	L 27–38	47,934
January 2, 2015	5:45 p.m.	vs. No. 14 UCLA*	No. 11	Alamodome; San Antonio, TX (Alamo Bowl)	ESPN	L 35–40	60,517
*Non-conference game; ^{†}Homecoming; Rankings from AP Poll (Pre–8) CFP (9–15) released prior to game; All times are in Central time

== Game summaries ==
=== Stephen F. Austin ===
	1	2	3	4	Total
Stephen F. Austin	0	10	6	0	16
#20 Kansas State	7	21	14	13	55

This was the first meeting of the two teams and the first game of the season for both teams. The Lumberjacks entered the season picked #6 in the Southland Conference. After forcing the Lumberjacks to punt, Kansas State scored first and maintained the lead for the entire game. Tyler Lockett caught a 9-yard touchdown pass from Jake Waters for a touchdown—the 19th career to move him within seven of his father Kevin Lockett's career school record. Kansas State won the game 55–16.

Kansas State achieved 29 first downs and 478 total offensive yards, averaging 7.9 yards per pass and 4.7 yards per carry, going 2–2 on fourth down attempts. Stephen F. Austin gave up 10 penalties for 69 yards and lost a fumble, but managed two touchdowns and 294 yards of total offense.

=== Iowa State ===
	1	2	3	4	Total
#20 Kansas State	13	7	0	12	32
Iowa State	7	21	0	0	28

Kansas State won its first game and entered the game with a record of 1–0, while Iowa State had just come off a loss against North Dakota State. Prior to the game, Iowa State has lost 32 of its last 36 games against ranked opponents while Kansas State had won the last six meetings overall after last season's 41–7 win. When ranked, the Wildcats have defeated the Cyclones in 10 straight dating to 1994.

The game began with Kansas State taking an early lead 13–0 in the first quarter, but Iowa State scored a touchdown before the quarter concluded. That Iowa State touchdown was the first of four consecutive for the cyclones which led them in with a 28–20 lead at halftime. Neither team scored in the third period and Kansas State's defense continued the fourth quarter to prevent any score, allowing the Kansas State offense to produce two more touchdowns and a Wildcat victory 32–28. The comeback-from-behind victory was considered "defining" for Kansas State.

During the game, Kansas State wide receiver Tyler Lockett caught a pass near the goal line on the sidelines. In this play, it appeared that his knee touched the pylon. That event would, by rule, negate the catch. The Wildcats scored a touchdown on the next play, which prevented any additional video review. The Big 12 replay official and communicator were given a one-game suspension for failing to follow protocol.

=== Auburn ===
	1	2	3	4	Total
#5 Auburn	3	7	0	10	20
#20 Kansas State	0	7	0	7	14

This was the first road game for Auburn of the season and was the first ranked opponent for the Tigers. It was the second time Kansas State has faced a ranked non-conference opponent under Bill Snyder. Both teams were expected to utilize the "pop" (play-option) pass offensively. Before this game, the two programs had met three times in the past (1978, 1979, and 2007), all Auburn victories.

Auburn was first to put points on the board with 11:14 remaining in the first quarter when Daniel Carlson hit a 34 Yard Field Goal. Kansas State took the lead with 4:56 left in the second quarter when DeMarcus Robinson succeeded with a 3-yard run, and Jack Cantele kicked the extra point to make the score 7–3. Auburn answered quickly with 1:34 left in the same quarter when Ricardo Louis caught a 40-yard pass from Nick Marshall for a touchdown, completing a drive of 9 plays for 75 yards. Daniel Carlson's kick was good and the score at halftime was Auburn 10, Kansas State 7. Auburn maintained the lead for the remainder of the game.

Kansas State did manage to stop Auburn's rush offense effectively (holding them to just 55 yards in the first half), but could not stop their pass game. Auburn was able to capitalize on a 3–1 turnover margin and take advantage of Kansas State's mistakes and missed field goals. The final score was considered close ("Auburn had just squeezed out a 20–14 victory") with a final score of Auburn 20, Kansas State 14.

=== UTEP ===
	1	2	3	4	Total
UTEP	0	0	7	21	28
#25 Kansas State	10	21	21	6	58

The University of Texas-El Paso (UTEP) and Kansas State have met twice in the past: 1947 and 1999. The 1947 meeting resulted in a Texas-El Paso victory of 20–6, and in 1999 Kansas State won 40–7. This game is the first time UTEP has traveled to the state of Kansas for football since the 1999 game against Kansas State. UTEP entered the game with a record of 2–1, their only loss to Big 12 member Texas Tech.

When the game rolled around, Kansas State scored 10 points in the first quarter and went into the half with a comfortable 31–0 lead. UTEP did not score until the third quarter after Kansas State had 45 points. Kansas State's defense held UTEP to 23 yards of offense and one first down in the first half.

The game play was slowed down for over 10 minutes when the officials had a hard time determining the proper ruling for an inadvertent whistle. Kansas State had blocked a punt and a UTEP player picked up the ball behind the line of scrimmage. The officials blew the play dead but then later ruled the ball was still "live" and let UTEP run the play again. In the end it did not matter as Kansas State won the game 58–28.

=== Texas Tech ===
	1	2	3	4	Total
Texas Tech	0	7	0	6	13
#23 Kansas State	7	17	7	14	45

Texas Tech entered the game with a 2–2 record but ranked 11th in overall passing yards. On September 6, Texas Tech defeated UTEP 30–26, the same team that Kansas State defeated the previous week. The two teams have met 14 times in the past and the Red Raiders led the series 8 wins to 6. They first met on November 30, 1933, in Lubbock, Texas, where Texas Tech won 6–0. Kansas State had won the last three meetings between the two programs.

Texas Tech's quarterback Davis Webb entered the game ranked eighth nationally with 339 yards passing per game. Tech's Bradley Marquez caught six touchdown passes for the season to rank second nationally leads the Big 12. Conversely, Texas Tech is among the worst teams in the nation in turnover margin, having turned the ball over 9 times.

Kansas State took the lead in the first quarter when Curry Sexton caught a 48-yard pass from Jake Waters for a touchdown with 7:18 left in the first quarter. Matthew McCrane's kick made the score 7–0 and the Wildcats led the remainder of game. At halftime, Kansas State had a lead by 24–7. Tyler Lockett made 12 catches for 125 yards with two touchdowns while teammate Curry Sexton had nine catches for 128 yards, also for two touchdowns.

Texas Tech managed 301 total passing yards, averaging 6 yards per pas but could only muster a total of 46 rushing yards on 14 attempts. Comparatively, Kansas State made slightly less yardage passing (290) but managed 245 yards rushing for a total of 535 yards of offense. Texas Tech turned the ball over on 4 interceptions while Kansas State lost only 1 fumble. Kansas State's offense controlled the game, maintaining possession for just over 40 minutes to Tech just under 20 minutes.

For penalties, Texas Tech committed 9 and gave up 89 yards compared to Kansas State's 1 penalty for 15 yards. Kansas State was 9–15 on third down compared to tech's 5–12, but both teams were 1–2 on fourth down attempts.

The final score was Kansas State 45, Texas Tech 13, making it Kansas State's fourth consecutive victory over Texas Tech.

=== Oklahoma ===
	1	2	3	4	Total
#14 Kansas State	7	14	10	0	31
#11 Oklahoma	7	10	7	6	30

Both teams entered the game with one loss each and a possible conference championship on the line. When the game ended, Kansas State found itself back in the hunt for the national title after receiving a little help from West Virginia, who defeated previously undefeated Baylor on the same day.

Statistically, Oklahoma lead in most every measure with 30 first downs to Kansas State's 17; 533 total yards to Kansas State's 385; and going 7–11 on third down compared to Kansas State's 5–11. Oklahoma also controlled the clock, having possession for a total of 32:18 compared to Kansas State's 27:42.

Oklahoma started by taking the lead with 4:58 left in the first quarter when Samaje Perine made a 2-yard dive for a touchdown, and Michael Hunnicutt's extra point put it to 7–0. Kansas State answered just 57 seconds later when Glenn Gronkowski caught a 62-yard pass from Jake Waters and Matthew McCrane put on the extra point to tie the game at 7–7.

In the second quarter, Kansas State's Danzel McDaniel took an interception just 5 yards into the end zone for an easy touchdown to take the lead, but the Sooner's Sterling Shepard tied it up with a 47-yard pass from Trevor Knight. Scoring continued in the second quarter when the Wildcat's Tyler Lockett caught a touchdown pass to take the lead and Oklahoma's Hunnicut made good on a 38-yard field goal. At the half, the score was Kansas State 21, Oklahoma 17.

Oklahoma managed to tie the score in the third quarter when Blake Bell caught a 4-yard touchdown pass to tie the score 24 each with 9:32 on the clock, but Jake Waters made a 4-yard touchdown run to take the lead 31–24 to end the third quarter.

Oklahoma had a chance to tie the game in the fourth quarter when Durron Neal caught a 9-yard touchdown pass to put the score at 31–30, but Kansas State's Travis Britz blocked the extra point. The final score was a Kansas State victory, 31–30.

=== Texas ===
	1	2	3	4	Total
Texas	0	0	0	0	0
#11 Kansas State	6	7	3	7	23

Texas came into the game with a record of 3–4 (2–2 in conference play) and unranked. A strong defensive performance led to a Wildcat victory as Kansas State defeated Texas 23–0. Texas experienced their first shutout since 2004 against the Oklahoma Sooners.

Kansas State dominated statistically throughout the game achieving 22 first downs and 367 total yards of offense compared to Texas production of 12 first downs and 196 yards. Texas committed 7 penalties for 66 yards compared to Kansas State's 3 penalties for 25 yards. Kansas State controlled the ball for 39:14 of game time and never gave up the ball, where Texas was on offense for 20:46 and gave up one fumble. Kansas State's Matthew McCrane was responsible for 11 points with three field goals and two extra points. DeMarcus Robinson and Charles Jones pitched in for one rushing touchdown each.

=== Oklahoma State ===
	1	2	3	4	Total
Oklahoma State	7	0	0	7	14
#9 Kansas State	14	7	10	17	48

Oklahoma State started the game with a 5–3 record (3–2 in conference play). The Cowboys had just come off their homecoming loss to West Virginia the previous week. Prior to this game, Oklahoma State led the series 37–23.

Oklahoma State scored in their opening drive by marching down the field and concluding when Tyreek Hill made a 2-yard run for a touchdown. Ben Grogan's kick made the score 7–0 OSU. But the ensuing kick-off by Oklahoma State resulted in Morgan Burns successfully running 86 yards for a touchdown. Matthew McCrane's extra point tied the score 7–7 with 11:36 on the clock in the first quarter. Kansas State's Charles Jones ran in for 6 yards with 4:16 left in the first and Kansas State held the lead for the remainder of the game. Kansas State achieved 36 unanswered points until Ramon Richards made a 38-yard interception for a touchdown after the K-State starters were pulled from the game. With 4:49 left in the game, Matthew McCrane was sent out to make an attempt at a 53-yard field goal. The attempt was good and Kansas State won 48–14.

Kansas State's Tyler Lockett passed current Green Bay Packers star Jordy Nelson for second in school history in yards receiving, ending the game with 2,877 yards. He also tied Quincy Morgan with 23 career touchdown catches. He is trailing only his father Kevin Lockett in both categories, at 3,032 yards and 26 touchdowns.

=== TCU ===
	1	2	3	4	Total
#7 Kansas State	7	0	7	6	20
#6 TCU	14	3	14	10	41

Kansas State travelled to play Texas Christian University the next week, who won their game earlier that same day at West Virginia. The Wildcats lost to the Horned Frogs 20–41.

=== West Virginia ===
	1	2	3	4	Total
#12 Kansas State	7	10	6	3	26
West Virginia	0	3	7	10	20

=== Kansas ===
	1	2	3	4	Total
Kansas	0	6	7	0	13
#12 Kansas State	17	14	14	6	51

=== Baylor ===
	1	2	3	4	Total
#9 Kansas State	0	14	6	7	27
#5 Baylor	14	10	14	0	38

=== UCLA–Alamo Bowl ===
	1	2	3	4	Total
#14 UCLA	17	14	3	6	40
#11 Kansas State	0	6	15	14	35

No. 14 UCLA jumped to a large halftime lead and held on for a 40–35 win over No. 11 Kansas State. Paul Perkins scored on a 67-yard run to give the Bruins a 40–28 lead with just over two minutes left in the game, and he helped recover an onside kick to seal the game after the Wildcats final score. He finished with a career-high 194 yards with two touchdowns, and was named the bowl's offensive most valuable player (MVP). UCLA ran for 331 yards, including 96 by Brett Hundley. After making a team-high 10 tackles, including three for a loss, the Bruins' Eric Kendricks was voted the game's defensive MVP. The win earned UCLA their second straight 10–3 season, and their first consecutive bowl victories since winning eight in a row from 1983 through 1991.

UCLA's Hundley ran for two touchdowns in the first quarter, when he also completed nine of 11 passes for 85 yards. The Bruins led 31–6 at the half after holding Kansas State to just 87 total yards. However, the Wildcats rallied to score 15 straight points and controlled the ball for almost 13 minutes in the third quarter. They pulled to within 34–28 after a touchdown with five minutes remaining. The scoring drive was extended by two penalties by UCLA, who had 15 for an Alamo Bowl record 128 yards. UCLA responded with Perkins' touchdown run on a second-and-13 play, extending the lead to 40–28. The Wildcats came as close as 40–35 with 1:21 remaining after Tyler Lockett caught a 29-yard touchdown pass from Jake Waters, but the comeback ended after their failed onside attempt.

Hundley accounted for three touchdowns and threw for 136 yards, but completed only three of 13 passes after the first quarter. The UCLA defense had a season-high seven sacks after entering the contest averaging just 1.8 (22 in 12 games). Perkins finished the season as the Pac-12 rushing leader with 1,575 yards. Kendricks led the Football Bowl Subdivision with 149 solo tackles. Kansas State's Lockett had an Alamo Bowl record 13 receptions for 164 yards, and tied the bowl record with two TD receptions. His 249 all-purpose yards were also a bowl record. Waters was 31-of-48 passing for 338 yards, but was intercepted twice and lost a fumble.

=== Scoring summary ===
Scoring summary

Quarter	Time	Drive			Team	Scoring information	Score	
Quarter	Time	Plays	Yards	TOP	Team	Scoring information	KSU	UCLA
1	12:47	6	77	2:13	UCLA	Brett Hundley 10-yard touchdown run, Kaʻimi Fairbairn kick good	0	7
1	8:03	10	50	3:35	UCLA	27-yard field goal by Kaʻimi Fairbairn	0	10
1	1:25	10	71	4:27	UCLA	Brett Hundley 28-yard touchdown run, Kaʻimi Fairbairn kick good	0	17
2	12:06	8	48	4:19	KSU	47-yard field goal by Matthew McCrane	3	17
2	10:05	4	3	0:56	KSU	29-yard field goal by Matthew McCrane	6	17
2	7:29	3	44	0:27	UCLA	Paul Perkins 32-yard touchdown run, Kaʻimi Fairbairn kick good	6	24
2	0:19	4	51	1:02	UCLA	Devin Lucien 7-yard touchdown reception from Brett Hundley, Kaʻimi Fairbairn kick good	6	31
3	7:23	17	75	7:37	KSU	Tyler Lockett 3-yard touchdown reception from Jake Waters, 2-point pass good	14	31
3	3:25	6	21	3:31	KSU	DeMarcus Robinson 1-yard touchdown run, Matthew McCrane kick good	21	31
3	0:33	7	39	2:52	UCLA	44-yard field goal by Kaʻimi Fairbairn	21	34
4	4:54	15	91	6:19	KSU	Jake Waters 1-yard touchdown run, Matthew McCrane kick good	28	34
4	2:20	5	76	2:34	UCLA	Paul Perkins 67-yard touchdown run, 2-point pass failed	28	40
4	1:21	4	90	0:59	KSU	Tyler Lockett 29-yard touchdown reception from Jake Waters, Matthew McCrane kick good	35	40
"TOP" = time of possession. For other American football terms, see Glossary of American football.							35	40

=== Statistics ===
Statistics	KSU	UCLA
First downs	27	16
Plays–yards	81–369	63–467
Rushes–yards	32–31	39–331
Passing yards	338	136
Passing: Comp–Att–Int	31–49–1	12–24–0
Time of possession	35:24	24:36

== Rankings ==
Ranking movements Legend: ██ Increase in ranking ██ Decrease in ranking
	Week																
Poll	Pre	1	2	3	4	5	6	7	8	9	10	11	12	13	14	15	Final
AP	20	20	19	20	25	23	17	14	11	11	9	13	12	11	9	11	18
Coaches	21	20	20	20	25	22	16	14	11	11	9	13	11	11	9	10	18
CFP	Not released									9	7	13	12	12	9	11	Not released

== Roster ==
2014 roster
Quarterbacks: 8 Joe Hubener – (redshirt) So.; 9 Taylor Laird – (redshirt) Fr.; 15 Jake Waters – Sr.; 17 Jessie Ertz – (redshirt) Fr.; 18 Zach Davidson – (redshirt) Fr.; Running backs: 3 Dalvin Warmack – Fr.; 20 DeMarcus Robinson – Sr.; 24 Charles Jones – So.; 28 Jarvis Leverett – So.; 32 Justin Silmon – Fr.; Full backs: 34 Adam Weber – Sr.; 36 David Authier – Fr.; 38 Winston Dimel – Fr.; 48 Glenn Gronkowski – So.; 89 Zach Nemechek – Sr.; Wide receivers: 2 Andre Davis – Jr.; 4 Dominique Heath – Fr.; 6 Deante Burton – (redshirt) So.; 7 Judah Jones – (redshirt) Fr.; 10 Lucas Munds – So.; 12 Stanton Weber – (redshirt) Jr.; 13 Steven West – So.; 14 Curry Sexton – Sr.; 16 Tyler Lockett – Sr.; 19 Kody Cook – (redshirt) Jr.; 23 Collin Sexton – (redshirt) So.; 31 Taylor Hilgers – (redshirt) Fr.; 81 Kyle Klein – (redshirt) Jr.; 83 Tyler Ahrens – Fr.; 87 Elliott Dawson – Jr.; Tight ends: 80 Cody Small – (redshirt) Fr.; 84 Zach Heiman – Fr.; 85 Zach Trujillo – Sr.; 88 Dayton Valentine – Fr.	Offensive line: 38 Dalton Harman – Fr. (long snapper); 43 Drew Scott – (redshirt) Fr.; 46 Dalton Converse – Jr. (long snapper); 53 Clayton Jackson – Fr.; 55 Cody Whitehair – Jr.; 56 Terrale Johnson – Jr.; 59 Jason Lierz – So.; 61 Drew Liddle – Sr.; 62 Ethan Calhoun – Fr.; 63 Jeb Drost – Fr.; 64 Aaron Bennett -Jr.; 65 Matt Kleinsorge – Jr.; 66 B. J. Finney – Sr.; 67 Reid Navjar – Fr.; 68 Luke Hayes – Jr.; 69 Reed Bergstrom – (redshirt) Jr.; 70 Will Ash – So.; 71 Dalton Risner – Fr.; 73 Alec Ruth – Fr.; 74 Kason Hostrup – Jr.; 75 AJ Allen – Jr.; 76 Ajahne Brager – Fr.; 77 Boston Stiverson – Jr.; 78 Bryce Fitzner – Fr.; Defensive line: 41 Logan Haug – (redshirt) Fr.; 43 Wyatt Schroeder – Fr.; 44 Ryan Mueller – Jr.; 45 Marquel Bryant – (redshirt) Fr.; 54 Taylor Godinet – So.; 55 Adam Davis – Jr.; 56 Wesley Hollingshed – Jr.; 60 Dustin Sobieraj – Jr.; 62 Logan Wiltfong – Fr.; 69 Logan O'Dea – Fr.; 73 Xavier Gates – (redshirt) Fr.; 90 Laton Dowling – So.; 91 Hakeem Akinola – Jr.; 94 Alauna Finau – Jr.; 95 Travis Britz – Fr.; 97 Demonte Hood – Fr.; 98 Chaquil Reed – Jr.	Linebackers: 6 Tate Snyder – So.; 20 Riley Williams – Fr.; 21 Jonathan Truman – Fr.; 33 Weston Hiebert – Fr.; 34 Cody Marley – So.; 35 David Smith – So.; 40 Antonio Felder – Jr.; 49 Will Davis – Fr.; 50 Tre Walker – Jr.; 51 Trace Armstrong – Fr.; 52 Mike Moore – Fr.; 55 Kadero Terrell – Jr.; 58 Clarence Bumpas – Fr.; 57 Colborn Couchman – Fr.; 58 Myles Copeland – Fr.; 59 Aaron Norris – (redshirt) Fr.; Defensive backs: 7 Kip Daily – (redshirt) Jr.; 10 Donny Starks – Fr.; 12 Ty Zimmerman – Jr.; 15 Randall Evans – So.; 17 Weston Hiebert – So.; 18 Jonathan Coleman – (redshirt) Fr.; 19 Carl Miles Jr. – Jr.; 22 Dante Barnett – Fr.; 25 Joseph Bonugli – So.; 27 Ed Brown – So.; 29 Kent Gainous – Jr.; 30 Dorian Roberts – (redshirt) Fr.; 32 Michael Mann – Fr.; 33 Morgan Burns – Fr.; 39 Cameron Morgan – Fr.; 40 Dylan Schellenberg – So.; Punters: 38 Mark Krause – (redshirt) Fr.; 48 Ethan Hammes – So.; Kickers: 8 Dillon Wilson – (redshirt) Fr.; 14 Jack Cantele – (redshirt) Fr.

== Coaching staff ==
The following is a list of coaches at Kansas State for the 2014 season.

Name	Position	Seasons at Kansas State	Alma mater
Bill Snyder	Head coach	23	William Jewell (1963)
Tom Hayes	Defensive coordinator	4	Iowa (1971)
Mike Cox	Linebackers	3	Idaho (1989)
Mo Latimore	Defensive line	31	Kansas State (1976)
Sean Snyder	Associate head coach/special teams coordinator	19	Kansas State (1994)
Dana Dimel	Co-offensive coordinator/running backs/tight ends	17	Kansas State (1986)
Del Miller	Co-offensive coordinator/quarterbacks	18	Central (1972)
Charlie Dickey	Offensive line	6	Arizona (1987)
Andre Coleman	Wide receivers	2	Kansas State (1994)
Blake Seiler	Defensive ends	4	Kansas State (2006)
Scotty Ohara	Offensive Graduate Assistant		
Taylor Braet	Director of Football Recruiting/special teams QC		
Ben Kall	Assistant Director of Recruiting/offensive Teams QC		
Collin Klein	Assistant Director of Recruiting/defensive Teams QC	1	Kansas State (2012)
Kelli Krier	Assistant Director of Recruiting		
