= Paul Perkins =

American football player (born 1994)

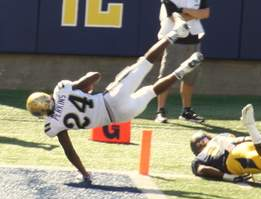
- Perkins with the UCLA Bruins in 2014

No. 28, 26
- Position: Running back

Personal information
- Born: November 16, 1994 (age 32); Mesa, Arizona, U.S.
- Listed height: 5 ft 11 in (1.80 m)
- Listed weight: 208 lb (94 kg)

Career information
- High school: Chandler (Chandler, Arizona)
- College: UCLA (2012–2015)
- NFL draft: 2016: 5th round, 149th overall pick

Career history
- New York Giants (2016–2019); Detroit Lions (2019); Jacksonville Jaguars (2019)*; Baltimore Ravens (2019)*; Indianapolis Colts (2020)*
- * Offseason or practice squad member only

Awards and highlights
- Second-team All-Pac-12 (2015)

Career NFL statistics
- Rushing yards: 575
- Rushing average: 3.5
- Receptions: 24
- Receiving yards: 217
- Stats at Pro Football Reference

Paul Kerry Perkins II (born November 16, 1994) is an American former professional football player who was a running back in the National Football League (NFL). He played college football for the UCLA Bruins, leading the Pac-12 Conference in rushing as a sophomore in 2014. He earned second-team All-Pac-12 honors the following year. He was selected by the New York Giants in the fifth round of the 2016 NFL draft, and was also a member of the Detroit Lions, Jacksonville Jaguars, Baltimore Ravens, and Indianapolis Colts.

== Early life ==
Perkins attended Chandler High School in Chandler, Arizona, where he played high school football with his childhood friend and future college teammate Brett Hundley. As a senior, Perkins was named first-team all-state after rushing for 1,297 yards and 20 touchdowns. He was also the most valuable player (MVP) of the track team, which won the state title.

Considered a three-star recruit by Rivals.com, he was rated as the 40th-best athlete prospect of his class. On December 4, 2011, he committed to UCLA over offers from Fresno State and Northwestern.

== College career ==
Perkins redshirted as a true freshman in 2012. In 2013, he became the Bruins' primary rusher after starter Jordon James sprained his ankle. Perkins started four games, and rushed for 573 yards on 134 carries (4.3 avg) and six touchdowns. He also caught 24 passes for 296 yards. In 2014, he worked his way into a pivotal role in the offense. As a backup to James in the season opener, Perkins ran for 80 yards against Virginia. He later became the team's starter. With starting quarterback Hundley exiting in the first quarter after an injury, Perkins gained 195 all-purpose yards in a 20–17 win over Texas. In the Alamo Bowl, he was named the game's offensive MVP after running for a then-career-high 194 yards and scoring two touchdowns in a 40–35 win over Kansas State. He finished the season as the Pac-12 leader with 1,575 yards rushing, the second-highest in UCLA history behind Johnathan Franklin (1,734 in 2012).

In 2015, Perkins ran for a career-high 219 yards against BYU. He finished his junior year with 1,343 yards and 14 touchdowns, and was named second-team All-Pac-12. After the season, he decided to forgo his senior season and declared for the 2016 NFL draft.

== Professional career ==
=== Pre-draft ===
Coming out of UCLA, Perkins was projected to be a third to fourth-round draft pick by various draft analysts. He was rated as the seventh-best running back by NFLDraftScout.com. Perkins was invited to the NFL Combine but was unable to finish all the drills after suffering an injury to his hamstring while running his 40-yard dash. Scouts and analysts gave mostly positive reviews focused on his one-cut ability, quality vision, reliable hands, decisive gap selection, and willingness to pick up blitzes. He was also criticized for his lack of consistent play speed, limited route options, and smallish frame.

Pre-draft measurables
| Height | Weight | Arm length | Hand span | 40-yard dash | 10-yard split | 20-yard split | Vertical jump | Broad jump | Bench press |
|---|---|---|---|---|---|---|---|---|---|
| 5 ft 10 3/8 in (1.79 m) | 208 lb (94 kg) | 31 5/8 in (0.80 m) | 9 in (0.23 m) | 4.54 s | 1.62 s | 2.69 s | 32 in (0.81 m) | 10 ft 4 in (3.15 m) | 19 reps |
All values from NFL Combine

=== New York Giants ===
Perkins was selected by the New York Giants in the fifth round of the 2016 NFL draft with the 149th overall pick. He signed a four-year, $2.59 million contract that included a signing bonus of $252,548. Perkins entered the 2016 season as the Giants' fourth running back on the depth chart, behind veterans Rashad Jennings, Bobby Rainey, and Orleans Darkwa. Late in the year, Perkins was being used as the primary back, in front of Jennings. In the regular season finale against the Washington Redskins, he had 21 carries for 102 rushing yards. The Giants lost in the Wild Card Round of the playoffs to the Green Bay Packers.

In May 2017, Giants head coach Ben McAdoo named Perkins the starting running back. Perkins played in 11 games in 2017 season and finished with 41 carries for 90 rushing yards and eight receptions for 46 yards. On May 10, 2018, he was waived by the Giants with a non-football injury designation after suffering a pectoral injury in the offseason, and then placed on their reserve/non-football injury list. On September 16, 2019, Perkins was waived by the Giants.

=== Detroit Lions ===
On September 17, 2019, Perkins was claimed off waivers by the Detroit Lions. He was released on October 17 and re-signed to the practice squad. He was promoted to the active roster on October 23. He was released on October 30 and re-signed to the practice squad. He was promoted back to the active roster on November 2. He was waived on November 16. In four games with the Lions, he recorded 12 carries for 29 rushing yards.

=== Jacksonville Jaguars ===
On December 3, 2019, Perkins was signed to the Jacksonville Jaguars practice squad. His practice squad contract with the team expired after the Jaguars' season on January 6, 2020.

=== Baltimore Ravens ===
On January 7, 2020, Perkins was signed to the Baltimore Ravens practice squad. His practice squad contract with the team expired on January 20, 2020.

=== Indianapolis Colts ===
On November 19, 2020, Perkins was signed to the Indianapolis Colts practice squad. On January 10, 2021, Perkins signed a reserve/futures contract with the Colts. He was released on May 3, 2021.

== Career statistics ==
=== NFL ===
==== Regular season ====
Legend
| **Bold** | Career high |

| Year | Team | Games | | Rushing | | | | | Receiving | | | | |
| Year | Team | GP | GS | Att | Yds | Avg | Lng | TD | Rec | Yds | Avg | Lng | TD |
|---|---|---|---|---|---|---|---|---|---|---|---|---|---|
| 2016 | NYG | **14** | 1 | **112** | **456** | **4.1** | **22** | 0 | **15** | **162** | **10.8** | **67** | 0 |
| 2017 | NYG | 11 | **4** | 41 | 90 | 2.2 | 14 | 0 | 8 | 46 | 5.8 | 11 | 0 |
| 2019 | DET | 4 | 0 | 12 | 29 | 2.4 | 13 | 0 | 1 | 9 | 9.0 | 9 | 0 |
| Career | | 20 | 5 | 165 | 575 | 3.5 | 22 | 0 | 24 | 217 | 9.0 | 67 | 0 |

==== Playoffs ====
| Year | Team | Games | | Rushing | | | | | Receiving | | | | |
| Year | Team | GP | GS | Att | Yds | Avg | Lng | TD | Rec | Yds | Avg | Lng | TD |
|---|---|---|---|---|---|---|---|---|---|---|---|---|---|
| 2016 | NYG | 1 | 1 | 10 | 30 | 3.0 | 14 | 1 | 3 | 27 | 9.0 | 17 | 0 |
| Career | | 1 | 1 | 10 | 30 | 3.0 | 14 | 1 | 3 | 27 | 9.0 | 17 | 0 |

=== College ===
| Year | Team | Games | Rushing | | | | Receiving | | | | Scrimmage | | | |
| Year | Team | Games | Att | Yds | Avg | TDs | Rec | Yds | Avg | Tds | Tch | Yds | Avg | Tds |
|---|---|---|---|---|---|---|---|---|---|---|---|---|---|---|
| 2013 | UCLA | 13 | 134 | 573 | 4.3 | 6 | 24 | 296 | 12.3 | 0 | 158 | 869 | 5.5 | 6 |
| 2014 | UCLA | 13 | 250 | 1572 | 6.3 | 9 | 26 | 201 | 7.7 | 2 | 276 | 1773 | 6.4 | 11 |
| 2015 | UCLA | 13 | 237 | 1343 | 5.7 | 14 | 30 | 242 | 8.1 | 1 | 267 | 1585 | 5.9 | 15 |
| Total | | 39 | 621 | 3488 | 5.6 | 29 | 80 | 739 | 9.2 | 3 | 701 | 4227 | 6.0 | 32 |

== Personal life ==
His father, Bruce Perkins, played fullback at Arizona State and briefly in the NFL. His great-uncle, Don Perkins, played eight seasons as a running back with the Dallas Cowboys. His younger brother, Bryce Perkins, plays quarterback for the Winnipeg Blue Bombers of the CFL. A cousin, Kadyn Proctor, currently plays guard for the Miami Dolphins.
