= Jake Brendel =

American football player (born 1992)

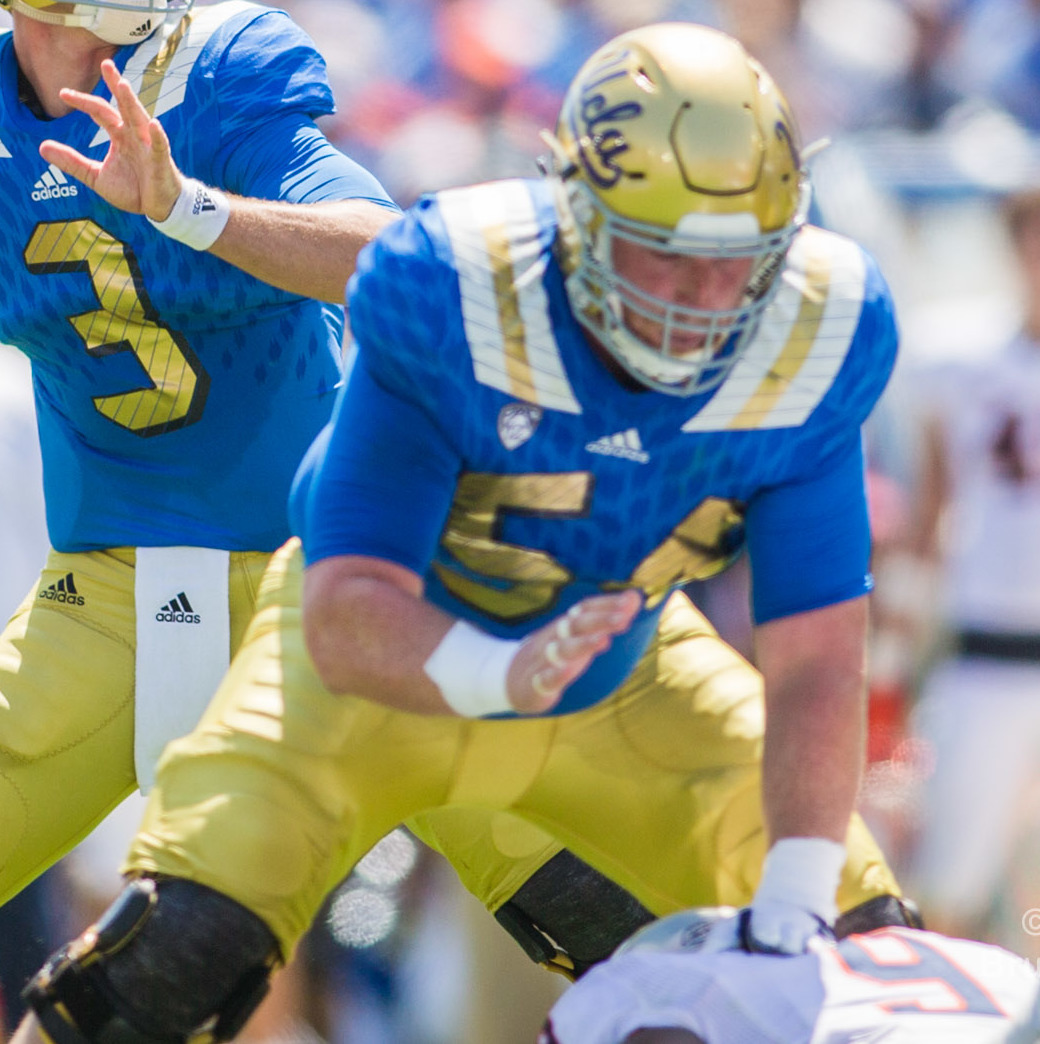
- Brendel with the UCLA Bruins in 2015

No. 64 – San Francisco 49ers
- Position: Center
- Roster status: Active

Personal information
- Born: September 10, 1992 (age 34); Madison, Wisconsin, U.S.
- Listed height: 6 ft 4 in (1.93 m)
- Listed weight: 299 lb (136 kg)

Career information
- High school: Plano East (Plano, Texas)
- College: UCLA (2011–2015)
- NFL draft: 2016: undrafted

Career history
- Dallas Cowboys (2016)*; Miami Dolphins (2016–2018); Denver Broncos (2019)*; Baltimore Ravens (2019); San Francisco 49ers (2020–present)
- * Offseason or practice squad member only

Awards and highlights
- 2× Second-team All-Pac-12 (2014, 2015)

Career NFL statistics as of Week 4, 2026
- Games played: 107
- Games started: 73
- Fumble recoveries: 1
- Receptions: 1
- Receiving yards: 2
- Stats at Pro Football Reference

Jacob William Brendel (born September 10, 1992) is an American professional football center for the San Francisco 49ers of the National Football League (NFL). He played college football for the UCLA Bruins. Brendel was signed by the Dallas Cowboys as an undrafted free agent in 2016.

== Early life ==
A native of Plano, Texas, Brendel attended Plano East Senior High School, where he played as a defensive tackle in his first 2 years.

He was moved to the offensive line as a junior. He served as a team captain and was a two-time first-team All-district at the offensive line. He was regarded as a three-star recruit by Rivals.com and was listed as the No. 15 center prospect in his class.

== College career ==
After redshirting his initial year at the University of California, Los Angeles, Brendel became a fixture at center after spring practice and started all 14 games for the Bruins in 2012. He was named first-team Freshman All-America by The Sporting News, CBSSports.com, and Football Writers Association of America, and second-team Freshman All-America by College Football News.

As a junior in 2014, he was the team's most experienced offensive lineman. After missing the season opener against Virginia with a knee injury, he returned to start the rest of the season. Brendel was named to the All-Pac-12 Conference second-team.

He requested an evaluation of his NFL draft stock, but decided to return for his senior year, when he again earned second-team All-Pac-12 honors. The three-time team captain finished his UCLA career with a school record of 52 starts. Brendel graduated from UCLA in Spring 2015 with a degree in Business Economics. He was named to the first-team All-Pac-12 Academic team.

== Professional career ==
Pre-draft measurables
Height	Weight	Arm length	Hand span	Wingspan	40-yard dash	10-yard split	20-yard split	20-yard shuttle	Three-cone drill	Vertical jump	Broad jump	Bench press
6 ft 4 1/8 in (1.93 m)	303 lb (137 kg)	31 5/8 in (0.80 m)	9 in (0.23 m)	6 ft 4 5/8 in (1.95 m)	5.01 s	1.72 s	2.89 s	4.27 s	7.31 s	28.0 in (0.71 m)	9 ft 0 in (2.74 m)	25 reps
All values from NFL Combine

=== Dallas Cowboys ===
Brendel was signed as an undrafted free agent by the Dallas Cowboys after the 2016 NFL draft on May 6. On September 3, 2016, he was released by the Cowboys. The next day, he was signed to the Cowboys' practice squad. He was released from the practice squad with an injury settlement on September 29.

=== Miami Dolphins ===
On October 11, 2016, Brendel was signed to the Miami Dolphins' practice squad. He was promoted to the active roster on November 19. He appeared in one game.

In 2017, he appeared in all 16 games as a backup center.

On September 2, 2018, Brendel was placed on injured reserve with a calf injury. He was activated off injured reserve on November 2. He played in four games, starting three at left guard and center due to injuries. He was placed back on injured reserve with a calf injury on December 12, 2018.

=== Denver Broncos ===
On April 18, 2019, Brendel signed with the Denver Broncos. He was released on August 31.

=== Baltimore Ravens ===
On November 27, 2019, Brendel was signed by the Baltimore Ravens, but was released three days later on November 30.

=== San Francisco 49ers ===
On February 7, 2020, Brendel was signed by the San Francisco 49ers. On August 6, Brendel announced he would opt out of the 2020 season due to the COVID-19 pandemic.

On August 31, 2021, Brendel was waived during final roster cuts.

On March 9, 2022, Brendel re-signed with the 49ers. He was named the 49ers starting center for 2022, starting all 17 games.

On March 15, 2023, Brendel signed a four-year contract extension with the 49ers. Brendel was a starter in Super Bowl LVIII. The 49ers lost to the Chiefs 25–22 in overtime.
