= Randall Goforth =

American football player (born 1994)

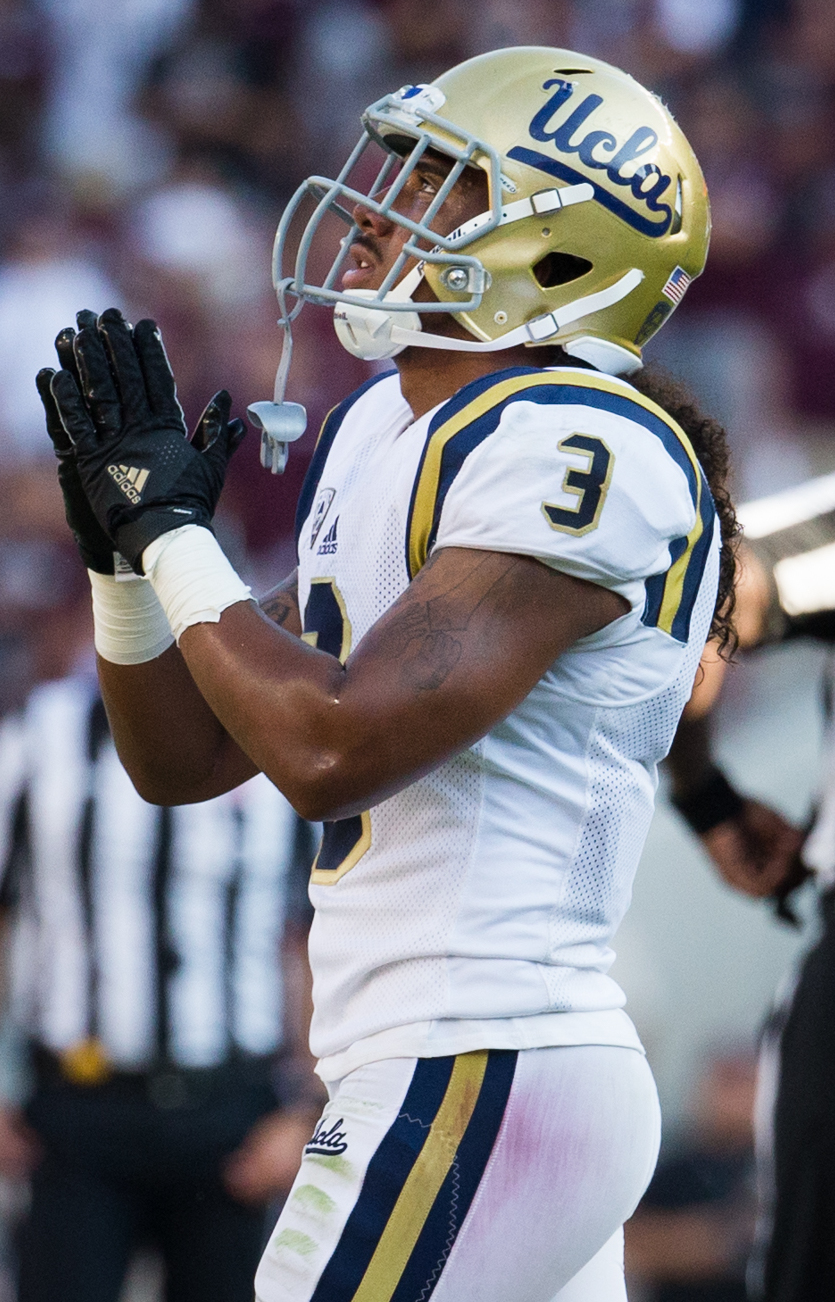
- Goforth with UCLA in 2016

No. 35
- Position: Cornerback

Personal information
- Born: January 27, 1994 (age 32); Long Beach, California, U.S.
- Listed height: 5 ft 10 in (1.78 m)
- Listed weight: 189 lb (86 kg)

Career information
- High school: Long Beach Poly
- College: UCLA
- NFL draft: 2017: undrafted

Career history
- Philadelphia Eagles (2017); Arizona Hotshots (2019)

Awards and highlights
- Super Bowl champion (LII); Second-team All-Pac-12 (2015)
- Stats at Pro Football Reference

Randall Jordan Goforth (born January 27, 1994) is an American former professional football player who was a cornerback in the National Football League (NFL). He played college football for the UCLA Bruins.

== College career ==
As a freshman at the University of California, Los Angeles, in 2012, Goforth played in all 14 games and started in five. He finished the year with 39 total tackles. Goforth came into his sophomore year in 2013 as a starter for the Bruins. He established totals in solo and total tackles and was the leader of the secondary, starting in all 13 games. Coming into his junior season, Goforth was seen as a possible NFL draft prospect and was one of the stars on the Bruins defense.

On August 20, 2014, Goforth solidified this when in the season opener at Virginia, he had 5 tackles and returned a fumble 75 yards for a touchdown in a 28–20 win. The next game vs the Memphis Tigers he went down with an injury, ending his season. In Goforth's redshirt junior season, he was named second team All-Pac-12 defense and in his junior season relied more All-Pac-12 honors.

In his career at UCLA Goforth totaled 250 tackles and 10 interceptions.

=== Statistics ===
College career statistics
Season	Team	Games	Tackles					Interceptions					Fumbles			
Season	Team	Games	Solo	Assists	Tot.	TFL	Sack	Int.	Yds.	Avg.	TD	PD	FR	Yds.	TD	FF
2012	UCLA	14	27	12	39	1.0	0.0	1	0	0	0	0	0	0	0	0
2013	UCLA	13	45	32	77	0.0	0.0	3	62	20.7	0	4	1	0	0	3
2014†	UCLA	2	6	1	7	1.0	0.0	0	0	0	0	0	1	75	1	0
2015	UCLA	13	40	29	69	0.0	0.0	2	17	8.5	1	9	1	0	0	0
2016	UCLA	11	44	14	58	3.0	1.0	4	89	22.3	0	9	0	0	0	1
Career		43	162	88	250	5.0	1.0	10	168	16.8	1	20	3	75	1	4

- † Goforth suffered an injury and was granted a redshirt by the NCAA.

== Professional career ==
Pre-draft measurables
Height	Weight	40-yard dash	10-yard split	20-yard split	20-yard shuttle	Three-cone drill	Vertical jump	Broad jump	Bench press
5 ft 10 in (1.78 m)	186 lb (84 kg)	4.55 s	1.58 s	2.62 s	4.35 s	7.13 s	27 in (0.69 m)	9 ft 10 in (3.00 m)	9 reps

=== Philadelphia Eagles ===
Goforth signed with the Philadelphia Eagles after going undrafted in the 2017 NFL draft. On July 29, 2017, Goforth tore his ACL in training camp and was placed on injured reserve, keeping him out the entire 2017 season. On August 2, 2017, he was placed on injured reserve. In his lone season with Philadelphia, Goforth went on to win Super Bowl LII with the Eagles against the New England Patriots 41–33.

On July 24, 2018, Goforth was waived by the Eagles.

=== Arizona Hotshots ===
In 2018, Goforth signed with the Arizona Hotshots of the Alliance of American Football for the 2019 season. He was waived on March 6, 2019.

=== Los Angeles Police Department ===
On June 11, 2021, Goforth announced via Instagram that he had successfully completed training to become a member of the Los Angeles Police Department. He publicly conveyed that his goal with the PD is to inspire change within the community of Los Angeles, as well as promote unity. Despite joining the LAPD, he still remains an NFL Free Agent.
