= Najee Toran =

American football player (born 1995)

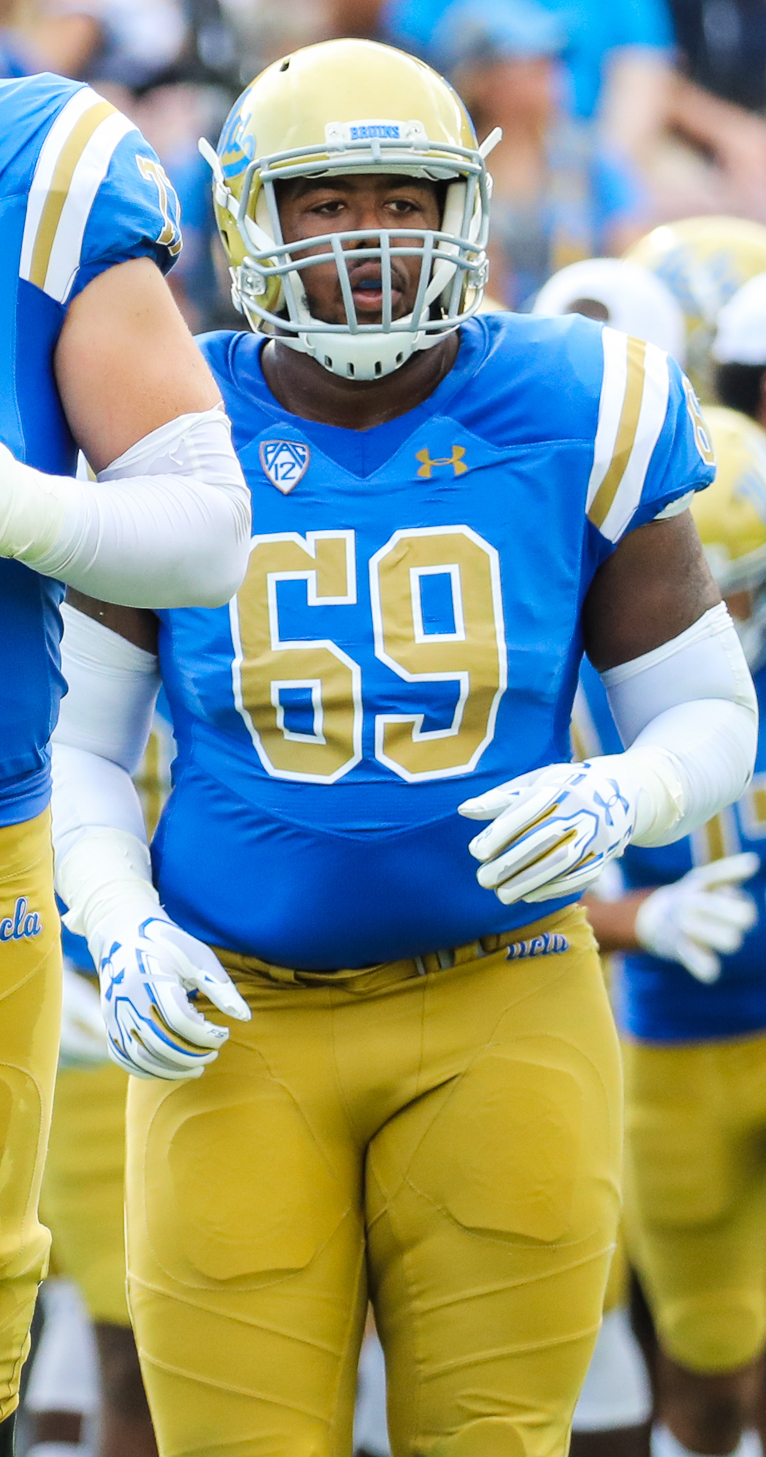
- Toran with the UCLA Bruins in 2017

No. 66, 61
- Position: Guard

Personal information
- Born: November 15, 1995 (age 31); Houston, Texas, U.S.
- Listed height: 6 ft 2 in (1.88 m)
- Listed weight: 305 lb (138 kg)

Career information
- High school: North Shore (Houston)
- College: UCLA
- NFL draft: 2018: undrafted

Career history
- San Francisco 49ers (2018); New England Patriots (2019–2021)*; Washington Football Team (2021)*
- * Offseason or practice squad member only
- Stats at Pro Football Reference

Najee Toran (born November 15, 1995) is an American former football guard. He played college football at UCLA and signed as an undrafted free agent with the San Francisco 49ers in 2018.

== Professional career ==
=== San Francisco 49ers ===
Toran was signed by the San Francisco 49ers as an undrafted free agent on May 1, 2018. He was waived by San Francisco on September 1, and was re–signed to the practice squad the following day. Toran was promoted to the active roster on September 12. He was waived by the 49ers on October 6, and was again re–signed to the practice squad.

Toran signed a reserve/future contract with the 49ers on January 2, 2019. On August 31, the 49ers cut Toran as a part of the team's final roster cuts.

=== New England Patriots ===
On September 2, 2019, Toran was signed to the New England Patriots' practice squad. He signed a reserve/future contract with the Patriots on January 6, 2020. On July 29, Toran exercised his option to opt out of the 2020 season due to the COVID-19 pandemic. He was waived by New England after the season on May 18, 2021.

=== Washington Football Team ===
Toran signed with the Washington Football Team on June 7, 2021, but was released after failing to report to training camp.
