= Alex Redmond =

American football player (born 1995)

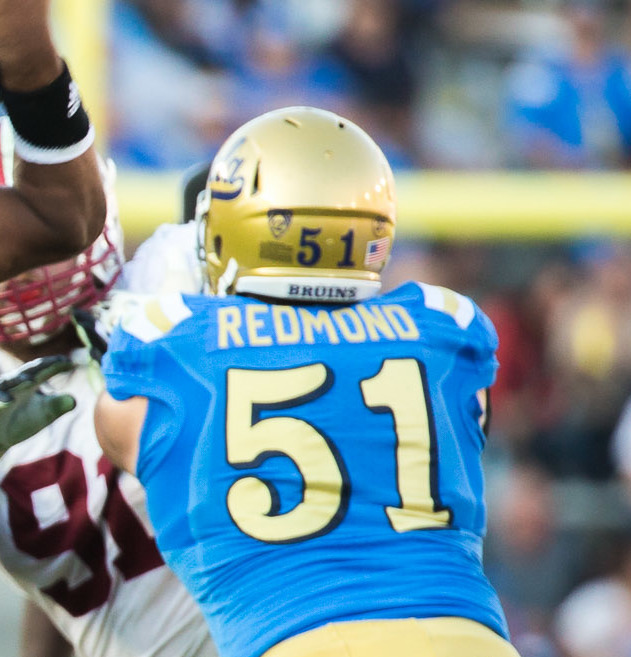
- Redmond with the UCLA Bruins

No. 62
- Position: Offensive guard

Personal information
- Born: January 18, 1995 (age 31); Long Beach, California, U.S.
- Listed height: 6 ft 5 in (1.96 m)
- Listed weight: 294 lb (133 kg)

Career information
- High school: Los Alamitos (Los Alamitos, California)
- College: UCLA
- NFL draft: 2016: undrafted

Career history
- Cincinnati Bengals (2016–2020); New England Patriots (2021)*
- * Offseason or practice squad member only

Career NFL statistics
- Games played: 32
- Games started: 24
- Stats at Pro Football Reference

Alex Edward Redmond (born January 18, 1995) is an American former professional football player who was an offensive guard in the National Football League (NFL). He played college football for the UCLA Bruins.

== Early life ==
Redmond played high school football at Los Alamitos High School in Los Alamitos, California. He also lettered three years in wrestling at Los Alamitos, becoming the first wrestling state finalist in school history.

== College career ==
Redmond played for the UCLA Bruins at the University of California, Los Angeles, from 2013 to 2015. He started all 13 games at right guard in 2013, tying the school record for most single-season starts by a true freshman position player. He earned Honorable Mention All-Pac-12 honors in 2013. Redmond was also named a First Team Freshman All-American by the Sporting News, Athlon Sports and the Football Writers Association of America. He started eight games at right guard in 2014, earning Honorable Mention All-Pac-12 honors. He played in 12 games, starting 10, in 2015. Redmond was declared academically ineligible prior to the team's final game of the 2015 season, the Foster Farms Bowl. He also declared for the 2016 NFL draft prior to the game. However, Redmond stated that he had always planned to enter the draft after three years. He also said that turning professional would help him support his daughter. He majored in history at UCLA.

== Professional career ==
Redmond was rated the 21st best offensive guard in the 2016 NFL Draft by NFLDraftScout.com. Lance Zierlein of NFL.com predicted that he would be drafted in the seventh round or be a priority free agent.

Pre-draft measurables
Height	Weight	Arm length	Hand span	40-yard dash	10-yard split	20-yard split	20-yard shuttle	Three-cone drill	Vertical jump	Broad jump	Bench press
6 ft 4 3/4 in (1.95 m)	294 lb (133 kg)	33 1/4 in (0.84 m)	10 1/2 in (0.27 m)	5.30 s	1.85 s	3.07 s	4.90 s	7.75 s	28 in (0.71 m)	9 ft 3 in (2.82 m)	30 reps
All values from NFL Combine

=== Cincinnati Bengals ===
After going undrafted, he signed with the Cincinnati Bengals on May 6, 2016. He was waived by the Bengals on September 3 and signed to the team's practice squad on September 4, 2016. He signed a reserve/future contract with the Bengals on January 2, 2017.

He became a full-time starter in 2018, starting 15 games at right guard.

Redmond was suspended the first four games of the 2019 season for violating the league's performance-enhancing drug policy. He was reinstated from suspension on October 1, 2019, and was activated on October 7. He was placed on injured reserve on November 29, 2019 after suffering a torn biceps during pregame warmups in Week 12.

On April 8, 2020, Redmond was re-signed to a one-year, $2.133 million contract. He was placed on the active/non-football injury list at the start of training camp on July 29, 2020. He was activated on August 31, 2020. He was released on September 6, 2020, and re-signed to the practice squad on September 21. He was promoted to the active roster on October 3, 2020.

=== New England Patriots ===
On May 17, 2021, Redmond signed with the New England Patriots. He was released on August 31, 2021 and re-signed to the practice squad.
