= Jacob Tuioti-Mariner =

American football player (born 1996)

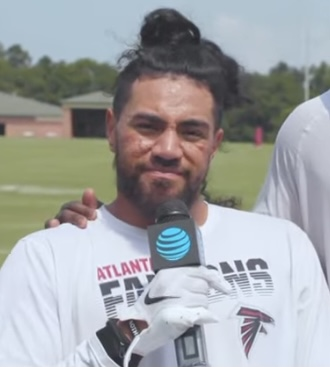
- Tuioti-Mariner in 2021

No. 91
- Position: Defensive end

Personal information
- Born: July 25, 1996 (age 30); Corona, California, U.S.
- Listed height: 6 ft 2 in (1.88 m)
- Listed weight: 285 lb (129 kg)

Career information
- High school: St. John Bosco (Bellflower, California)
- College: UCLA
- NFL draft: 2018: undrafted

Career history
- Atlanta Falcons (2018–2021); Pittsburgh Steelers (2021)*; Carolina Panthers (2021)
- * Offseason or practice squad member only

Career NFL statistics
- Total tackles: 54
- Sacks: 3
- Forced fumbles: 2
- Fumble recoveries: 3
- Stats at Pro Football Reference

Jacob Siaosiselaginato Tuioti-Mariner (born July 25, 1996) is an American former professional football player who was a defensive end in the National Football League (NFL). He played college football for the UCLA Bruins.

== Early life ==
Born in Corona, California, to a Samoan American family, Tuioti-Mariner attended St. John Bosco High School in Bellflower, California.

As a senior, he contributed to the team winning the CIF Pac-5 Division championship and the CIF state championship Open Division bowl game.

== Professional career ==
=== Atlanta Falcons ===
Tuioti-Mariner was signed by the Atlanta Falcons as an undrafted free agent on May 3, 2018. He was waived on September 1, 2018, and was signed to the practice squad the next day. He signed a reserve/future contract on December 31, 2018.

On August 31, 2019, Tuioti-Mariner was waived by the Falcons and signed to the practice squad the next day. He was promoted to the active roster on November 4, 2019. As a rookie, he appeared in eight games.

In Week 12 of the 2020 season against the Las Vegas Raiders, Tuioti-Mariner recovered a fumble forced by teammate Foyesade Oluokun on Derek Carr and later recorded a strip sack on Carr that he recovered himself during the 43–6 win. Tuioti-Mariner was named the National Football Conference Defensive Player of the Week for his performance in Week 12.

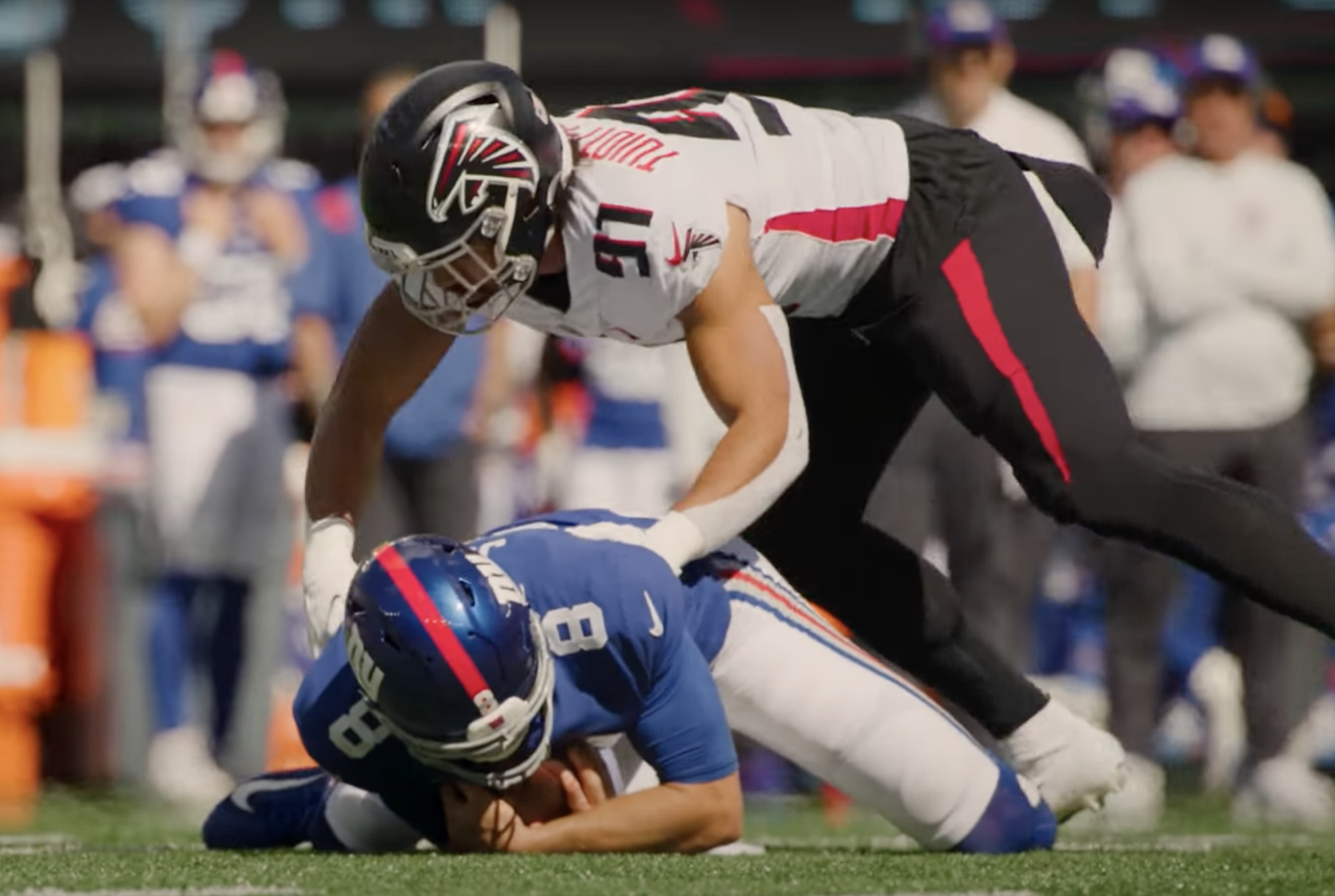
Tuioti-Mariner sacking New York Giants quarterback Daniel Jones in 2021

Tuioti-Mariner signed a contract extension with the Falcons on March 11, 2021. He was waived on November 9, 2021.

=== Pittsburgh Steelers ===
On November 11, 2021, Tuioti-Mariner signed with the Pittsburgh Steelers practice squad.

=== Carolina Panthers ===
On January 5, 2022, Tuioti-Mariner was signed by the Carolina Panthers off the Steelers practice squad. He was placed on injured reserve on August 11, and released on August 16.

== Personal life ==
Tuioti-Mariner's cousin, A. J. Epenesa, is also a professional football player. His father played professional volleyball and rugby. Tuioti-Mariner has six siblings.
