= Austin Roberts (American football) =

American football player (born 1995)

No. 42, 87
- Position: Tight end

Personal information
- Born: December 3, 1995 (age 30); Plano, Texas
- Listed height: 6 ft 2 in (1.88 m)
- Listed weight: 230 lb (104 kg)

Career information
- High school: Carmel (Carmel, Indiana)
- College: UCLA
- NFL draft: 2018: undrafted

Career history
- Los Angeles Chargers (2018)
- Stats at Pro Football Reference

Austin Roberts (born December 3, 1995) is an American former football tight end. He played college football at UCLA.

== Early life ==
Roberts was born in Plano, Texas, but grew up in Hollywood, Florida, where he attended Plant High School for two years before moving to Indianapolis, Indiana, before his junior season, finishing his last two years of high school at Carmel High School. As a senior at Carmel, Roberts caught 50 passes for 560 yards and five touchdowns along with returning seven kickoffs for 254 yards and two touchdowns. Roberts committed to play football for the UCLA Bruins in July 2013, choosing the Bruins over schools such as Alabama, Miami, and Ohio State among others.

== College career ==
Roberts tore his ACL at UCLA in July 2014, causing him to miss his freshman season at UCLA. He elected to take a medical redshirt.

As a redshirt freshman in 2015, Roberts played in four games for UCLA, catching one pass for 19 yards.

In 2016, as a redshirt sophomore, Roberts played in 11 of 12 games, having 15 receptions for 261 yards and one touchdown.

As a redshirt junior in 2017 Roberts played in ten games, tallying 19 receptions for 220 yards and two touchdowns. After the season, Roberts declared for the 2018 NFL draft.

== Professional career ==
The Los Angeles Chargers signed Roberts as an undrafted free agent on May 30, 2018. Roberts became the sixth Bruin to be signed as an undrafted free agent. During training camp on July 29, 2018, Roberts suffered a torn ACL. He was placed on injured reserve on August 2, 2018. He was waived on May 9, 2019.

== Personal life ==
Roberts' father, Alfredo Roberts is a former NFL player who is now the tight ends coach for the Pittsburgh Steelers, having previously coached running backs and tight ends for the Los Angeles Chargers.
