= Devin Lucien =

American football player (born 1993)

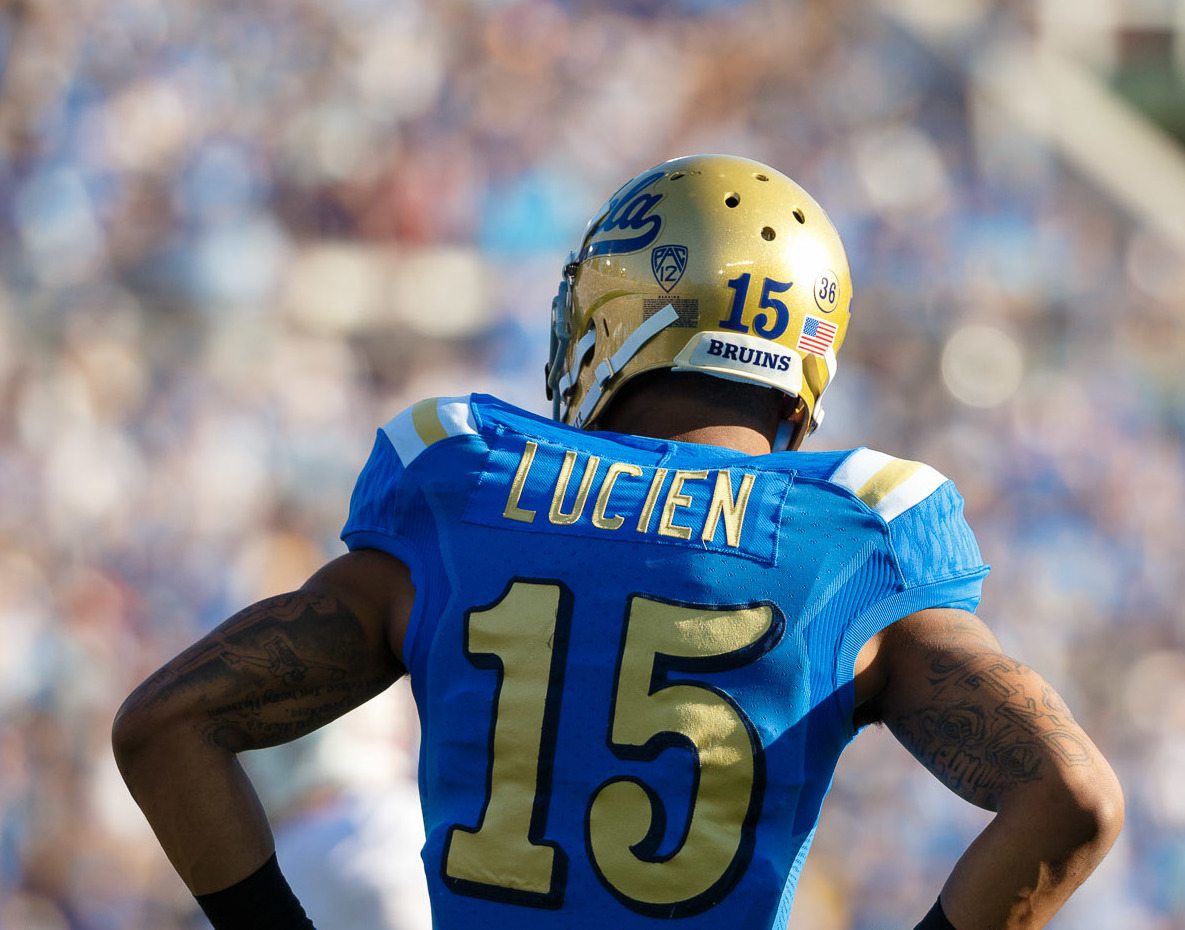
- Lucien with the UCLA Bruins in 2014

Profile
- Position: Wide receiver

Personal information
- Born: June 26, 1993 (age 33); Los Angeles, California, U.S.
- Listed height: 6 ft 2 in (1.88 m)
- Listed weight: 200 lb (91 kg)

Career information
- High school: Crespi Carmelite (Encino, California)
- College: Arizona State
- NFL draft: 2016: 7th round, 225th overall pick

Career history
- New England Patriots (2016–2017)*; Indianapolis Colts (2017)*; Kansas City Chiefs (2017)*; Houston Texans (2017)*; Tampa Bay Buccaneers (2017–2018)*; New England Patriots (2018)*; Arizona Hotshots (2019)*; Memphis Express (2019); Winnipeg Blue Bombers (2020)*; BC Lions (2023)*
- * Offseason or practice squad member only

Awards and highlights
- Super Bowl champion (LI)
- Stats at Pro Football Reference

Devin Lucien (born June 26, 1993) is an American professional football wide receiver. He played college football for the UCLA Bruins before transferring as a graduate to the Arizona State Sun Devils. He was selected by the New England Patriots in the seventh round of the 2016 NFL draft.

== Professional career ==
Pre-draft measurables
Height	Weight	Arm length	Hand span	40-yard dash	10-yard split	20-yard split	20-yard shuttle	Three-cone drill	Vertical jump	Broad jump
6 ft 0 1/2 in (1.84 m)	201 lb (91 kg)	31 7/8 in (0.81 m)	10 1/8 in (0.26 m)	4.49 s	1.53 s	2.57 s	4.30 s	6.93 s	34.5 in (0.88 m)	9 ft 9 in (2.97 m)

=== New England Patriots (first stint) ===
The New England Patriots selected Lucien in the seventh round (225th overall) of the 2016 NFL draft. On September 3, 2016, he was released by the Patriots as part of final roster cuts and was signed to the practice squad the next day. After spending his entire rookie year on the practice squad, Lucien won his first Super Bowl when the Patriots defeated the Atlanta Falcons in Super Bowl LI by a score of 34–28 in overtime. On February 7, 2017, Lucien signed a futures contract with the Patriots.

On September 2, 2017, Lucien was waived/injured by the Patriots.

=== Indianapolis Colts ===
On September 12, 2017, Lucien was signed to the Indianapolis Colts' practice squad. On September 15, he was placed on the practice squad injured list. Lucien was released by Indianapolis on October 3.

=== Kansas City Chiefs ===
On November 7, 2017, Lucien was signed to the Kansas City Chiefs' practice squad. He was released by Kansas City on November 29.

=== Houston Texans ===
On December 5, 2017, Lucien was signed to the Houston Texans' practice squad, but was released one week later.

=== Tampa Bay Buccaneers ===
On December 20, 2017, Lucien was signed to the Tampa Bay Buccaneers' practice squad. He signed a reserve/future contract with the Buccaneers on January 3, 2018. Lucien was waived by the Buccaneers on May 13.

=== New England Patriots (second stint) ===
On July 23, 2018, Lucien signed with the New England Patriots. On August 31, Lucien was released by New England as part of final roster cuts.

=== Alliance of American Football ===
Lucien signed with the Arizona Hotshots of the Alliance of American Football (AAF) for the 2019 season, but was traded to the Memphis Express on January 26, 2019, in exchange for offensive guard Blake Muir. Lucien was placed on injured reserve on March 25. The league ceased operations in April 2019.

=== Winnipeg Blue Bombers ===
Lucien signed a futures contract with the Winnipeg Blue Bombers of the Canadian Football League (CFL) on November 13, 2019. He retired from professional football on May 12, 2020.

=== BC Lions ===
On December 19, 2022, Lucien came out of retirement and signed with the BC Lions of the CFL. On April 14, 2023, Lucien was released by the Lions.
