= 2013 UCLA Bruins football team =

American college football season

2013 UCLA Bruins football

Sun Bowl champion

Sun Bowl, W 42–12 vs. Virginia Tech
- Conference: Pac-12 Conference
- South Division

Ranking
- Coaches: No. 16
- AP: No. 16
- Record: 10–3 (6–3 Pac-12)
- Head coach: Jim L. Mora (2nd season)
- Offensive coordinator: Noel Mazzone (2nd season)
- Offensive scheme: Multiple
- Defensive coordinator: Lou Spanos (2nd season)
- Base defense: 4–3
- Home stadium: Rose Bowl

2013 Pac-12 Conference football standings
| | Conf. | | | Overall |
| Team | W | | L | W | | L |
|---|---|---|---|---|---|---|
North Division
| No. 11 Stanford xy$ | 7 | – | 2 | 11 | – | 3 |
| No. 9 Oregon x | 7 | – | 2 | 11 | – | 2 |
| No. 25 Washington | 5 | – | 4 | 9 | – | 4 |
| Oregon State | 4 | – | 5 | 7 | – | 6 |
| Washington State | 4 | – | 5 | 6 | – | 7 |
| California | 0 | – | 9 | 1 | – | 11 |
South Division
| No. 21 Arizona State xy | 8 | – | 1 | 10 | – | 4 |
| No. 16 UCLA | 6 | – | 3 | 10 | – | 3 |
| No. 19 USC | 6 | – | 3 | 10 | – | 4 |
| Arizona | 4 | – | 5 | 8 | – | 5 |
| Utah | 2 | – | 7 | 5 | – | 7 |
| Colorado | 1 | – | 8 | 4 | – | 8 |
Championship: Stanford 38, Arizona State 14
$ – BCS representative as conference champion; x – Division champion/co-champions; y – Championship game participant; Rankings from AP Poll

The 2013 UCLA Bruins football team represented the University of California, Los Angeles in the 2013 NCAA Division I FBS football season. The team was coached by second year head coach Jim L. Mora and played its home games at the Rose Bowl in Pasadena, California. They were members of the South Division of the Pac-12 Conference. The Bruins finished the season 10–3, including 6–3 in conference play to finish second in the South Division, and outscored their opponents by a combined total of 480 to 301.

== Recruiting ==
National Signing Day was on February 6, 2013.

College recruiting (2013)
| Name | Hometown | School | Height | Weight | 40^{‡} | Commit date |
|---|---|---|---|---|---|---|
| Darren Andrews; WR | La Puente, CA | Bishop Amat Memorial High School | 5 ft 10 in (1.78 m) | 160 lb (73 kg) | N/A | Nov 18, 2012 |
| Darren Andrews; WR | Recruit ratings: Scout: Rivals: 247Sports: ESPN: (68) | | | | | |
| Caleb Benenoch; OG | Katy, TX | Seven Lakes High School | 6 ft 6 in (1.98 m) | 317 lb (144 kg) | 5.20 | Nov 10, 2012 |
| Caleb Benenoch; OG | Recruit ratings: Scout: Rivals: 247Sports: ESPN: (81) | | | | | |
| Jayon Brown; OLB | Long Beach, CA | Long Beach Polytechnic High School | 6 ft 0.5 in (1.84 m) | 205 lb (93 kg) | N/A | Sep 26, 2012 |
| Jayon Brown; OLB | Recruit ratings: Scout: Rivals: 247Sports: ESPN: (72) | | | | | |
| Kenny Clark; DT | Rialto, CA | Wilmer Amina Carter High School | 6 ft 2 in (1.88 m) | 285 lb (129 kg) | N/A | Jul 7, 2012 |
| Kenny Clark; DT | Recruit ratings: Scout: Rivals: 247Sports: ESPN: (79) | | | | | |
| Sean Covington; P | Saint Petersburg, FL | St. Petersburg High School | 6 ft 2 in (1.88 m) | 195 lb (88 kg) | N/A | Oct 18, 2012 |
| Sean Covington; P | Recruit ratings: Scout: Rivals: 247Sports: ESPN: (78) | | | | | |
| Thomas Duarte; TE | Santa Ana, CA | Mater Dei High School (Santa Ana, California) | 6 ft 4 in (1.93 m) | 225 lb (102 kg) | N/A | Jan 4, 2013 |
| Thomas Duarte; TE | Recruit ratings: Scout: Rivals: 247Sports: ESPN: (79) | | | | | |
| Kylie Fitts; DE | Redlands, CA | Redlands East Valley High School | 6 ft 4 in (1.93 m) | 260 lb (120 kg) | N/A | Feb 5, 2013 |
| Kylie Fitts; DE | Recruit ratings: Scout: Rivals: 247Sports: ESPN: (84) | | | | | |
| Tyler Foreman; S | Encino, CA | Crespi Carmelite High School | 6 ft 2 in (1.88 m) | 190 lb (86 kg) | 4.63 | Jan 20, 2013 |
| Tyler Foreman; S | Recruit ratings: Scout: Rivals: 247Sports: ESPN: (77) | | | | | |
| Tahaan Goodman; S | Rancho Cucamonga, CA | Rancho Cucamonga High School | 6 ft 2 in (1.88 m) | 190 lb (86 kg) | 4.52 | Jan 23, 2013 |
| Tahaan Goodman; S | Recruit ratings: Scout: Rivals: 247Sports: ESPN: (84) | | | | | |
| Deon Hollins; OLB | Missouri City, TX | Marshall High School (Marshall, Texas) | 6 ft 2 in (1.88 m) | 222 lb (101 kg) | 4.59 | Mar 20, 2012 |
| Deon Hollins; OLB | Recruit ratings: Scout: Rivals: 247Sports: ESPN: (84) | | | | | |
| Myles Jack; OLB | Bellevue, WA | Bellevue High School (Bellevue, Washington) | 6 ft 3 in (1.91 m) | 230 lb (100 kg) | 4.50 | Jun 20, 2012 |
| Myles Jack; OLB | Recruit ratings: Scout: Rivals: 247Sports: ESPN: (79) | | | | | |
| Johnny Johnson; CB | Fresno, CA | Central High School (Fresno, California) | 5 ft 10 in (1.78 m) | 180 lb (82 kg) | N/A | Jan 20, 2013 |
| Johnny Johnson; CB | Recruit ratings: Scout: Rivals: 247Sports: ESPN: (83) | | | | | |
| Mossi Johnson; CB | Los Angeles, CA | Crenshaw High School | 6 ft 1 in (1.85 m) | 185 lb (84 kg) | N/A | Oct 4, 2012 |
| Mossi Johnson; CB | Recruit ratings: Scout: Rivals: 247Sports: ESPN: (80) | | | | | |
| Cameron Judge; OLB | Westlake Village, CA | Oaks Christian School | 6 ft 2 in (1.88 m) | 215 lb (98 kg) | N/A | Feb 6, 2013 |
| Cameron Judge; OLB | Recruit ratings: Scout: Rivals: 247Sports: ESPN: (77) | | | | | |
| Kenny Lacy; OT | Phoenix, AZ | Mountain Pointe High School | 6 ft 5 in (1.96 m) | 270 lb (120 kg) | N/A | Jan 27, 2013 |
| Kenny Lacy; OT | Recruit ratings: Scout: Rivals: 247Sports: ESPN: (79) | | | | | |
| Craig Lee; RB | Redlands, CA | Redlands High School | 6 ft 0 in (1.83 m) | 188 lb (85 kg) | N/A | Aug 15, 2012 |
| Craig Lee; RB | Recruit ratings: Scout: Rivals: 247Sports: ESPN: (81) | | | | | |
| John Lopez; OG | Orange, CA | Lutheran High School of Orange County | 6 ft 5 in (1.96 m) | 305 lb (138 kg) | 5.97 | Aug 1, 2012 |
| John Lopez; OG | Recruit ratings: Scout: Rivals: 247Sports: ESPN: (82) | | | | | |
| Eldridge Massington; WR | Mesquite, TX | West Mesquite High School | 6 ft 3 in (1.91 m) | 205 lb (93 kg) | 4.40 | Dec 18, 2012 |
| Eldridge Massington; WR | Recruit ratings: Scout: Rivals: 247Sports: ESPN: (83) | | | | | |
| Poasi Moala; OT | Moreno Valley, CA | Rancho Verde High School | 6 ft 5 in (1.96 m) | 265 lb (120 kg) | N/A | Sep 22, 2012 |
| Poasi Moala; OT | Recruit ratings: Scout: Rivals: 247Sports: ESPN: (77) | | | | | |
| Christian Morris; OT | Memphis, TN | East High School (Memphis, Tennessee) | 6 ft 6 in (1.98 m) | 285 lb (129 kg) | 5.40 | Feb 6, 2013 |
| Christian Morris; OT | Recruit ratings: Scout: Rivals: 247Sports: ESPN: (78) | | | | | |
| Jalen Ortiz; RB | Peoria, AZ | Centennial High School (Peoria, Arizona) | 5 ft 9 in (1.75 m) | 170 lb (77 kg) | 4.55 | Sep 23, 2012 |
| Jalen Ortiz; RB | Recruit ratings: Scout: Rivals: 247Sports: ESPN: (80) | | | | | |
| Scott Quessenberry; C | Encinitas, CA | La Costa Canyon High School | 6 ft 3 in (1.91 m) | 265 lb (120 kg) | 5.10 | Oct 5, 2012 |
| Scott Quessenberry; C | Recruit ratings: Scout: Rivals: 247Sports: ESPN: (82) | | | | | |
| Alex Redmond; OG | Los Alamitos, CA | Los Alamitos High School | 6 ft 5 in (1.96 m) | 295 lb (134 kg) | 5.68 | Dec 7, 2012 |
| Alex Redmond; OG | Recruit ratings: Scout: Rivals: 247Sports: ESPN: (78) | | | | | |
| Isaac Savaiinaea; MLB | Honolulu, HI | Punahou School | 6 ft 3 in (1.91 m) | 230 lb (100 kg) | N/A | Feb 6, 2013 |
| Isaac Savaiinaea; MLB | Recruit ratings: Scout: Rivals: 247Sports: ESPN: (84) | | | | | |
| Eddie Vanderdoes; DT | Auburn, CA | Placer High School | 6 ft 3.5 in (1.92 m) | 303 lb (137 kg) | 4.90 | Jun 4, 2013 |
| Eddie Vanderdoes; DT | Recruit ratings: Scout: Rivals: 247Sports: ESPN: (90) | | | | | |
| Priest Willis; CB | Tempe, AZ | Marcos de Niza High School | 6 ft 2 in (1.88 m) | 190 lb (86 kg) | 4.42 | Jan 23, 2013 |
| Priest Willis; CB | Recruit ratings: Scout: Rivals: 247Sports: ESPN: (85) | | | | | |
| Asiantii Woulard; QB | Winter Park, FL | Winter Park High School | 6 ft 4 in (1.93 m) | 200 lb (91 kg) | N/A | Feb 6, 2013 |
| Asiantii Woulard; QB | Recruit ratings: Scout: Rivals: 247Sports: ESPN: (83) | | | | | |
Overall recruit ranking: Scout: 3 Rivals: 8* 247Sports: 7 ESPN: 12*
Note: In many cases, Scout, Rivals, 247Sports, On3, and ESPN may conflict in their listings of height and weight.; In these cases, the average was taken. ESPN grades are on a 100-point scale.; Sources: "2013 Team Ranking". Rivals.com.

- *Rivals and ESPN overall ranking do not include Eddie Vanderdoes recruitment.
- June 4, 2013 – Highly touted DE Eddie Vanderdoes signed a grant-in-aid with the Bruins, after decommitting from Notre Dame. Although Vanderdoes was not released from Notre Dame's letter of intent – thus forcing him to sit out the 2013 football season – reports were released that family health issues drove him to decommit and hoped these circumstances will help his appeal to play this season. His appeal to the NCAA National Letter of Intent Appeals Committee was approved on July 30 after his appearance before the committee.

== Roster ==
2013 UCLA Bruins Roster
| Offense Wide receivers: 1 Shaq Evans – (redshirt) Senior; 4 Darren Andrews – Freshman; 7 Devin Fuller – Sophomore; 8 Jalen Ortiz – Freshman; 9 Jordan Payton – Sophomore; 10 Kenneth Walker III – Sophomore (injured); 15 Devin Lucien – (redshirt) Sophomore; 19 Zach Hernandez – (redshirt) Freshman; 26 Ahmaad Harris – (redshirt) Freshman; 32 Sam Handler – (redshirt) Freshman; 81 Tyler Scott – (redshirt) Sophomore; 82 Eldridge Massington – Freshman; 83 Grayson Mazzone – (redshirt) Senior; 86 Logan Sweet – (redshirt) Sophomore; Offensive tackles: 58 Colby Cyburt – (redshirt) Freshman; 60 Christian Morris – Freshman; 68 Conor McDermott – (redshirt) Freshman; 70 Simon Goines – Sophomore; 71 Poasi Moala – Freshman; 76 Kenny Lacy – Freshman; 77 Torian White – (redshirt) Sophomore (injured); Offensive guards: 50 Kevin McReynolds – (redshirt) Sophomore; 51 Alex Redmond – Freshman; 55 Ben Wysocki – (redshirt) Sophomore; 56 Xavier Su'a-Filo – Junior; 74 Caleb Benenoch – Freshman; 75 John Lopez – Freshman; Centers: 52 Scott Quessenberry – Freshman; 54 Jake Brendel – (redshirt) Sophomore; 57 Carl Hulick – (redshirt) Freshman; Tight ends: 3 Darius Bell – (redshirt) Senior; 18 Thomas Duarte – Freshman; 85 Spencer Atkins – Freshman; 88 Daniel Eaton – (redshirt) Freshman; 89 Jordan Barrett – (redshirt) Senior; Fullbacks: 44 Philip Ruhl – (redshirt) Junior; 48 Tre Hale – (redshirt) Junior; 49 Luke Gane – (redshirt) Junior | Running backs: 6 Jordon James – (redshirt) Junior; 20 Melvin Emesibe – (redshirt) Sophomore; 22 Roosevelt Davis – (redshirt) Sophomore; 24 Paul Perkins – (redshirt) Freshman; 25 Damien Thigpen – (redshirt) Senior; 28 Malcolm Jones – Senior; 33 Steven Manfro – (redshirt) Sophomore; 35 Ryan Davis – (redshirt) Freshman; Quarterbacks: 2 Asiantii Woulard – Freshman; 10 Brendan Cross – Graduate; 11 Jerry Neuheisel – (redshirt) Freshman; 12 Mike Fafaul – (redshirt) Freshman; 14 T.J. Millweard – (redshirt) Freshman; 17 Brett Hundley – (redshirt) Sophomore; 29 Jake Hall – (redshirt) Freshman; Defense Defensive ends: 40 Keenan Graham – (redshirt) Senior; 47 Eddie Vanderdoes – Freshman; 71 Zach Vinci – (redshirt) Sophomore; 87 Ian Taubler – Sophomore; 89 Thomas Schwab – Freshman; 91 Sam Tai – (redshirt) Sophomore; 92 Brandon Willis – (redshirt) Junior; 93 Kylie Fitts – Freshman; 94 Owamagbe Odighizuwa – Senior (injured); 99 Cassius Marsh – Senior; Defensive tackles: 90 Ellis McCarthy – Sophomore; 95 Brandon Tuliaupupu – (redshirt) Sophomore; 96 Eli Ankou – (redshirt) Freshman; 97 Kenneth Clark – Freshman; 98 Seali’i Epenesa – Senior; Outside Linebackers: 8 Deon Hollins – Freshman; 11 Anthony Barr – Senior; 30 Myles Jack – Freshman; 32 Nate Iese – (redshirt) Freshman; 41 Aramide Olaniyan – (redshirt) Junior; 46 Kenny Orjioke – Sophomore; 51 Aaron Wallace – (redshirt) Sophomore; 56 Jeremy Castro – Freshman | Inside Linebackers: 4 Stan McKay – (redshirt) Senior; 6 Eric Kendricks – (redshirt) Junior; 19 Jayon Brown – Freshman; 28 Taylor Lagace – (redshirt) Freshman; 35 Jordan Zumwalt – Senior; 42 Aaron Porter – (redshirt) Freshman; 43 Willie Green – (redshirt) Freshman; 44 Issako Savaiinaea – Freshman; 45 Cameron Judge – Freshman; 53 Ryan Hofmeister – (redshirt) Junior; 55 Isaiah Bowens – (redshirt) Senior; Cornerbacks: 2 Priest Willis – Freshman; 7 John Johnson – Freshman (injured); 9 Marcus Rios – Sophomore (injured); 10 Fabian Moreau – Sophomore; 18 Charles Dawson – Freshman; 20 Justin Combs – (redshirt) Freshman; 23 Anthony Jefferson – (redshirt) Junior; 24 Ishmael Adams – Sophomore (injured); 29 Erick Zumwalt – (redshirt) Sophomore; Safeties: 1 Dietrich Riley – (redshirt) Junior (injured); 3 Randall Goforth – Sophomore; 21 Tahaan Goodman – Freshman; 22 Tyler Foreman – Freshman; 25 Brandon Sermons – (redshirt) Senior; 26 Michael Carlson – Freshman; 31 Librado Barocio – (redshirt) Junior; 33 Dylan Luther – Freshman; Special teams Punters/Kickers: 15 Kaʻimi Fairbairn – Sophomore PK/KO; 19 Sean Covington – Freshman P; 98 Mitch Johnson – (redshirt) Freshman PK/KO; Long snappers: 45 Peter Hajimihalis – (redshirt) Sophomore; 59 Christopher Longo – (redshirt) Sophomore; 88 Reed Buce – Freshman; Punt Returners/Kickoff Returners: 1 Shaq Evans – (redshirt) Senior PR; 3 Randall Goforth – Sophomore PR; 7 Devin Fuller – Sophomore KR; 25 Damien Thigpen – (redshirt) Senior KR; 33 Steven Manfro – (redshirt) Sophomore PR/KR |
Source: 2013 UCLA Bruins Football Roster

== Key players ==
=== Offense ===
- X – Devin Lucien (So.R) or Jordan Payton (So.)
- F – Devin Fuller (So.)
- LT – Simon Goines (So.)
- LG – Xavier Su'a-Filo (Jr.)
- C – Jake Brendel (So.R)
- RG – Alex Redmond (Fr.)
- RT – Caleb Benenoch (Fr.)
- Y – Darius Bell (Sr.R)
- BY – Jordan Barrett (Sr.R)
- QB – Brett Hundley (So.R)
- FB – Nate Iese (Fr.R) or Phillip Ruhl (Jr.R)
- TB – Jordon James (Jr.R)
- Z – Shaquelle Evans (Sr.R)

=== Defense ===
- LDE – Ellis McCarthy (So.)
- NT – Seali'i Epenesa (Sr.)
- RDE – Cassius Marsh (Sr.)
- LOLB – Myles Jack (Fr.) or Aaron Wallace (So.R)
- ILB – Jordan Zumwalt (Sr.)
- ILB – Eric Kendricks (Jr.R)
- ROLB – Anthony Barr (Sr.)
- LCB – Fabian Moreau (So.)
- S – Anthony Jefferson (Jr.R)
- S – Randall Goforth (So.)
- RCB – Ishmael Adams (So.)

=== Specialists ===
- PK – Kaʻimi Fairbairn (So.)
- KO – Kaʻimi Fairbairn (So.) or Sean Covington (Fr.)
- P – Sean Covington (Fr.)
- LS – Christopher Longo (So.R)
- H – Jerry Neuheisel (Fr.R)
- Punt return – Shaq Evans (Sr.R)
- Kickoff return – Steven Manfro (So.R)

== Pre-season ==
- April 27, 2013 – Spring football was held from April 2 to 27
- July 26, 2013 – 2013 Media Day was held at Sony Pictures Studios, Culver City, California
- August 7, 2013 – Pre-season practices at Cal State San Bernardino began, concluded on August 17.

== Schedule ==
| Date | Time | Opponent | Rank | Site | TV | Result | Attendance |
|---|---|---|---|---|---|---|---|
| August 31 | 7:00 pm | Nevada* | No. 21 | Rose Bowl; Pasadena, CA | P12N | W 58–20 | 60,562 |
| September 14 | 9:00 am | at No. 23 Nebraska* | No. 16 | Memorial Stadium; Lincoln, NE | ABC | W 41–21 | 91,471 |
| September 21 | 7:30 pm | New Mexico State* | No. 13 | Rose Bowl; Pasadena, CA | P12N | W 59–13 | 58,263 |
| October 3 | 7:00 pm | at Utah | No. 12 | Rice-Eccles Stadium; Salt Lake City, UT | FS1 | W 34–27 | 45,272 |
| October 12 | 7:30 pm | California | No. 11 | Rose Bowl; Pasadena, CA (rivalry) | ESPN2 | W 37–10 | 84,272 |
| October 19 | 12:30 pm | at No. 13 Stanford | No. 9 | Stanford Stadium; Stanford, CA (rivalry) | ABC/ESPN2 | L 10–24 | 51,424 |
| October 26 | 4:00 pm | at No. 2 Oregon | No. 12 | Autzen Stadium; Eugene, OR (College GameDay) | ESPN | L 14–42 | 59,206 |
| November 2 | 4:30 pm | Colorado^{†} | No. 17 | Rose Bowl; Pasadena, CA | FS1 | W 45–23 | 80,377 |
| November 9 | 7:00 pm | at Arizona | No. 16 | Arizona Stadium; Tucson, AZ | ESPN | W 31–26 | 51,531 |
| November 15 | 6:00 pm | Washington | No. 13 | Rose Bowl; Pasadena, CA | ESPN2 | W 41–31 | 68,106 |
| November 23 | 4:00 pm | No. 19 Arizona State | No. 14 | Rose Bowl; Pasadena, CA | FOX | L 33–38 | 70,131 |
| November 30 | 5:00 pm | at No. 23 USC | No. 22 | Los Angeles Memorial Coliseum; Los Angeles, CA (Victory Bell/rivalry) | ABC | W 35–14 | 86,037 |
| December 31 | 11:00 am | vs. Virginia Tech* | No. 17 | Sun Bowl Stadium; El Paso, TX (Sun Bowl) | CBS | W 42–12 | 47,912 |
*Non-conference game; ^{†}Homecoming; Rankings from AP Poll released prior to game; All times are in Pacific time

== Game summaries ==
=== Nevada ===
| | 1 | 2 | 3 | 4 | Total |
|---|---|---|---|---|---|
| Nevada | 3 | 10 | 0 | 7 | 20 |
| #21 UCLA | 7 | 10 | 20 | 21 | 58 |

Under first year head coach Brian Polian, Nevada played UCLA for the first time. The Wolfpack were highly ranked in the nation last year: scoring (18th), total offense (8th), and rushing (7th).

1st quarter scoring: UCLA – Brett Hundley 37-yard run (Kai'mi Fairbairn kick); NEV – Brent Zuzo 28-yard field goal

2nd quarter scoring: UCLA – Fairbairn 40-yard field goal; NEV – Zuzo 21-yard field goal; UCLA – Shaquell Evans 5-yard pass from Hundley (Fairbairn kick); NEV – Cody Fajardo 1-yard run (Zuzo kick)

3rd quarter scoring: UCLA – Hundley 11-yard run (Fairbairn kick); UCLA – Phillip Ruhl 4-yard blocked punt return (Fairbairn kick); UCLA – Jordon James 26-yard run (Jerry Neuheisel pass failed)

4th quarter scoring: NEV – Fajardo 19-yard run (Zuzo kick); UCLA – Paul Perkins 3-yard run (Fairbairn kick); UCLA – Malcolm Jones 25-yard pass from Hundley (Fairbairn kick); UCLA – Jones 1-yard run (Fairbairn kick)

=== Nebraska ===
| | 1 | 2 | 3 | 4 | Total |
|---|---|---|---|---|---|
| #16 UCLA | 3 | 7 | 28 | 3 | 41 |
| #23 Nebraska | 14 | 7 | 0 | 0 | 21 |

This is the 12th meeting between the two teams, with Nebraska leading the series 6–5. UCLA defeated Nebraska last year 36–30 at the Rose Bowl. When both teams were ranked in 1994, Nebraska (No. 2) won 49–21 over the 13th-ranked Bruins. The teams will honor the passing of UCLA player Nick Pasquale by placing his number 36 on their uniforms.

1st quarter scoring: NEB – Quincy Enunwa 11-yard pass from Taylor Martinez (Pat Smith kick); UCLA – Kaʻimi Fairbairn 44-yard field goal; NEB – Enunwa 14-yard pass from Martinez (Mauro Bondi kick)

2nd quarter scoring: NEB – Kenny Bell 22-yard pass from Martinez (Smith kick); UCLA – Paul Perkins 10-yard run (Fairbairn kick)

3rd quarter scoring: UCLA – Jordon James 3-yard run (Fairbairn kick); UCLA – Shaquelle Evans 28-yard pass from Hundley (Fairbairn kick); UCLA – Phillip Ruhl 12-yard pass from Hundley (Fairbairn kick); UCLA – Nate Iese 3-yard pass from Hundley (Fairbairn kick)

4th quarter scoring: UCLA – Fairbairn 24-yard field goal

=== New Mexico State ===
| | 1 | 2 | 3 | 4 | Total |
|---|---|---|---|---|---|
| New Mexico State | 0 | 0 | 0 | 13 | 13 |
| #13 UCLA | 7 | 24 | 14 | 14 | 59 |

First meeting between the two schools. New Mexico State head coach Doug Martin replaced DeWayne Walker, who was a former UCLA defensive coordinator. Nick Pasquale was remembered during the game.

1st quarter scoring: UCLA – Jordon James 4-yard run (Kaim Fairbairn kick)

2nd quarter scoring: UCLA – Steven Manfro 20-yard pass from Brett Hundley (Fairbairn kick); UCLA – Manfro 12-yard run (Fairbairn kick); UCLA – Fairbairn 38-yard field goal; UCLA – Devin Fuller 21-yard pass from Hundley (Fairbairn kick)

3rd quarter scoring: UCLA – Shaquell Evans 7-yard pass from Hundley (Fairbairn kick); UCLA – James 19-yard run (Fairbairn kick)

4th quarter scoring: NMSU – Adam Shapiro 33-yard pass from A. McDonald (Mitch Johnson kick); UCLA – Malcolm Jones 3-yard run (Fairbairn kick); NMSU – B. Betancourt 4-yard run (Johnson kick failed); UCLA – Jones 3-yard run (Fairbairn kick)

=== Utah ===
| | 1 | 2 | 3 | 4 | Total |
|---|---|---|---|---|---|
| #12 UCLA | 7 | 14 | 3 | 10 | 34 |
| Utah | 14 | 3 | 0 | 10 | 27 |

In this series, UCLA has a 9–2 overall record and 3–2 in Salt Lake City. Utah has won two of the last three games with UCLA (2007 and 2011, under Kyle Whittingham). UCLA won last year 21–14.

1st quarter scoring: UCLA – Jordon James 1-yard run (Kaʻimi Fairbairn kick); Utah – Dres Anderson 54-yard pass from Travis Wilson (Andy Phillips kick); Utah – Sean Fitzgerald 6-yard pass from Wilson (Phillips kick)

2nd quarter scoring: UCLA – Hundley 7-yard pass from Devin Fuller (Fairbairn kick); UCLA – Jordan Payton 17-yard pass from Hundley (Fairbairn kick); Utah – Phillips 44-yard field goal

3rd quarter scoring: UCLA – Fairbairn 33-yard field goal

4th quarter scoring: Utah – Keith McGill 19-yard interception of Hundley pass (Phillips); UCLA – Fairbairn 47-yard field goal; UCLA – Hundley 36-yard run (Fairbairn kick); UCLA – Hundley 36-yard run (Fairbairn kick); Utah – Phillips 44-yard field goal

=== California ===
| | 1 | 2 | 3 | 4 | Total |
|---|---|---|---|---|---|
| California | 0 | 10 | 0 | 0 | 10 |
| #11 UCLA | 10 | 14 | 6 | 7 | 37 |

California is 32–50–1 against UCLA since the series began in 1933. This is Sonny Dykes first year taking on the Bruins as California's head coach, whose team implements an air raid offense that will challenge UCLA's young but talented secondary. Hoping to avenge last year's 43–17 loss, the Bruins are favored to win at home.

1st quarter scoring: UCLA – Kaʻimi Fairbairn 24-yard field goal; UCLA – Devin Fuller 18-yard pass from Brett Hundley (Fairbairn kick)

2nd quarter scoring: UCLA – Paul Perkins 1-yard run (Fairbairn kick); CAL – Vincenzo D'Amato 51-yard field goal; CAL – Daniel Lasco 6-yard run (D'Amato Kick); UCLA – Thomas Duarte 27-yard pass from Hundley (Fairbairn kick)

3rd quarter scoring: UCLA – Fairbairn 22-yard field goal; UCLA – Fairbairn 27-yard field goal

4th quarter scoring: UCLA – Shaquelle Evans 22-yard pass from Hundley (Fairbairn kick)

=== Stanford ===
| | 1 | 2 | 3 | 4 | Total |
|---|---|---|---|---|---|
| #9 UCLA | 0 | 0 | 3 | 7 | 10 |
| #13 Stanford | 3 | 0 | 14 | 7 | 24 |

1st quarter scoring: STAN – Conrad Ukropina 31-yard field goal

2nd quarter scoring: No scoring

3rd quarter scoring: UCLA – Kaʻimi Fairbairn 38-yard field goal; STAN – Kodi Whitfield 30-yard pass from Kevin Hogan (Ukropina kick); STAN – Tyler Gaffney 1-yard run (Ukropina kick)

4th quarter scoring: UCLA – Shaquelle Evans 3-yard pass from Brett Hundley (Fairbairn kick); STAN – Gaffney 4-yard run (Ukropina kick)

=== Oregon ===
| | 1 | 2 | 3 | 4 | Total |
|---|---|---|---|---|---|
| #12 UCLA | 7 | 7 | 0 | 0 | 14 |
| #2 Oregon | 7 | 7 | 7 | 21 | 42 |

1st quarter scoring: UCLA – Brett Hundley 4-yard run (Kaʻimi Fairbairn kick); ORE – De'Anthony Thomas 1-yard run (Alejandro Maldonado kick)

2nd quarter scoring: ORE – Byron Marshall 40-yard run (Matt Wogan kick); UCLA – Thomas Duarte 11-yard pass from Brett Hundley (Fairbairn kick)

3rd quarter scoring: ORE – Marshall 11-yard run (Maldonado kick)

4th quarter scoring: ORE – Bralon Addison 8-yard pass from Marcus Mariota (Maldonado kick); ORE – Marshall 3-yard run (Maldonado kick); ORE – Thomas Tyner 2-yard run (Wogan kick)

=== Colorado ===
| | 1 | 2 | 3 | 4 | Total |
|---|---|---|---|---|---|
| Colorado | 3 | 10 | 0 | 10 | 23 |
| #17 UCLA | 7 | 14 | 14 | 10 | 45 |

1st quarter scoring: COLO – Will Oliver 23-yard field goal; UCLA – Devin Fuller 76-yard pass from Brett Hundley (Kaʻimi Fairbairn kick)

2nd quarter scoring: COLO – Paul Richardson 7-yard pass from Sefo Liufau (Will Oliver kick); UCLA – Hundley 11-yard run (Fairbairn kick); UCLA – Devin Fuller 6-yard pass from Hundley (Fairbairn kick); COLO – Oliver 47-yard field goal

3rd quarter scoring: UCLA – Hundley 1-yard run (Fairbairn kick); UCLA – Damien Thigpen 5-yard run (Fairbairn kick)

4th quarter scoring: COLO – Tony Jones 2-yard run (Oliver kick); UCLA – Fairbairn 45-yard field goal; COLO – Oliver 37-yard field goal; UCLA – Fuller 8-yard run (Fairbairn kick)

=== Arizona ===
| | 1 | 2 | 3 | 4 | Total |
|---|---|---|---|---|---|
| #16 UCLA | 14 | 7 | 3 | 7 | 31 |
| Arizona | 3 | 7 | 3 | 13 | 26 |

UCLA leads the series at 20–15–2 and Arizona has won five of last six games between the two teams. Jack Folliard is the referee.

1st quarter scoring: ARIZ – Jake Smith 44-yard field goal; UCLA – Shaquell Evans 66-yard pass from Brett Hundley (Kaim Fairbairn kick); UCLA – Hundley 15-yard run (Fairbairn kick)

2nd quarter scoring: ARIZ – Ka'Deem Carey 4-yard run (Smith kick); UCLA – Evans 4-yard pass from Hundley (Fairbairn kick)

3rd quarter scoring: UCLA – Fairbairn 34-yard field goal; ARIZ – Smith 27-yard field goal

4th quarter scoring: ARIZ – N. Phillips 15-yard pass from B. Denker (2-point conversion failed); UCLA – Myles Jack 66-yard run (Fairbairn kick); ARIZ – Phillips 14-yard pass from Denker (Smith kick)

=== Washington ===
| | 1 | 2 | 3 | 4 | Total |
|---|---|---|---|---|---|
| Washington | 7 | 10 | 7 | 7 | 31 |
| #13 UCLA | 20 | 7 | 7 | 7 | 41 |

The Bruins lead the series, 38–30–2. Last time the teams met, during the 2010 season, Washington won 24–7 in Seattle. UCLA was the winner in the Rose Bowl, a 24–23 decision in 2009. The Bruins have won the last seven straight games played in the Rose Bowl against the Huskies.

1st quarter scoring: UCLA – Myles Jack 8-yard run (Kaʻimi Fairbairn kick); UCLA – Cassius Marsh 2-yard pass from Brett Hundley (Fairbairn kick); WASH – Bishop Sankey 2-yard run (Travis Coons kick); UCLA – Jack 1-yard run (failed kick)

2nd quarter scoring: UCLA – Jack 1-yard run (Fairbairn kick); WASH – Jaydon Mickens 2-yard pass from Keith Price (Coons kick); WASH – Coons 34-yard field goal

3rd quarter scoring: WASH – Austin Seferian-Jenkins 1-yard pass from Cyler Miles (Coons kick); UCLA – Jack 2-yard run (Fairbairn kick)

4th quarter scoring: UCLA – Devin Lucien 40-yard pass from Hundley (Fairbairn kick); WASH – Damore'ea Stringfellow 14-yard pass from Miles (Coons kick)

=== Arizona State ===
| | 1 | 2 | 3 | 4 | Total |
|---|---|---|---|---|---|
| #19 Arizona State | 14 | 21 | 3 | 0 | 38 |
| #14 UCLA | 10 | 3 | 14 | 6 | 33 |

1st quarter scoring: ASU – Taylor Kelly 3-yard run (Zane Gonzalez kick); UCLA – Devin Lucien 42-yard pass from Brett Hundley (Kaim Fairbairn kick); UCLA – Fairbairn 48-yard field goal; ASU – D. J. Foster 3-yard run (Gonzalez kick)

2nd quarter scoring: ASU – Carl Bradford 18-yard interception return (Gonzalez kick); ASU – Michael Eubank, 1-yard run (Gonzalez kick); UCLA – Fairbairn 23-yard field goal; ASU – Jaelen Strong 19-yard pass from Kelly (Gonzalez kick)

3rd quarter scoring: UCLA – Myles Jack 3-yard run (Fairbairn kick); UCLA – Paul Perkins 1-yard run (Fairbairn kick); ASU – Gonzalez 28-yard field goal

4th quarter scoring: UCLA – Shaquell Evans 27-yard pass from Hundley (Hundley pass intercepted

=== USC ===
| | 1 | 2 | 3 | 4 | Total |
|---|---|---|---|---|---|
| #22 UCLA | 7 | 7 | 14 | 7 | 35 |
| #23 USC | 0 | 7 | 7 | 0 | 14 |

Last season, the Bruins defeated the Trojans 38–28 in the Rose Bowl.

1st quarter scoring: UCLA – Myles Jack 3-yard run (Kaʻimi Fairbairn kick)

2nd quarter scoring: UCLA – Eddie Vanderdoes 1-yard run (Fairbairn kick); USC – Javorius Allen 11-yard run (Andre Heidari kick)

3rd quarter scoring: UCLA – Brett Hundley 12-yard run (Fairbairn kick); USC – Xavier Grimble 22-yard pass from Cody Kessler (Heidari kick); UCLA – Hundley 5-yard run (Fairbairn kick)

4th quarter scoring: UCLA – Paul Perkins 8-yard run (Fairbairn kick)

=== Virginia Tech (Sun Bowl) ===
| | 1 | 2 | 3 | 4 | Total |
|---|---|---|---|---|---|
| Virginia Tech | 7 | 0 | 3 | 2 | 12 |
| #17 UCLA | 7 | 7 | 0 | 28 | 42 |

1st quarter scoring: UCLA – Brett Hundley 7-yard run (Kaʻimi Fairbairn kick); VT – J.C. Coleman 1-yard run ( Michael Branthover (kick)

2nd quarter scoring: UCLA – Hundley 86-yard run (Fairbairn kick)

3rd quarter scoring: VT – Branthover 22-yard field goal

4th quarter scoring: UCLA – Paul Perkins 5-yard run (Fairbairn kick); UCLA – Myles Jack intercepted pass from Mark Leal 24-yards return (Fairbairn kick); VT – Sean Covington 3-yard loss for safety; UCLA – Thomas Duarte 8-yard pass from Hundley (Fairbairn kick); UCLA – Shaquelle Evans 59-yard pass from Hundley (Fairbairn kick)

== Coaches ==
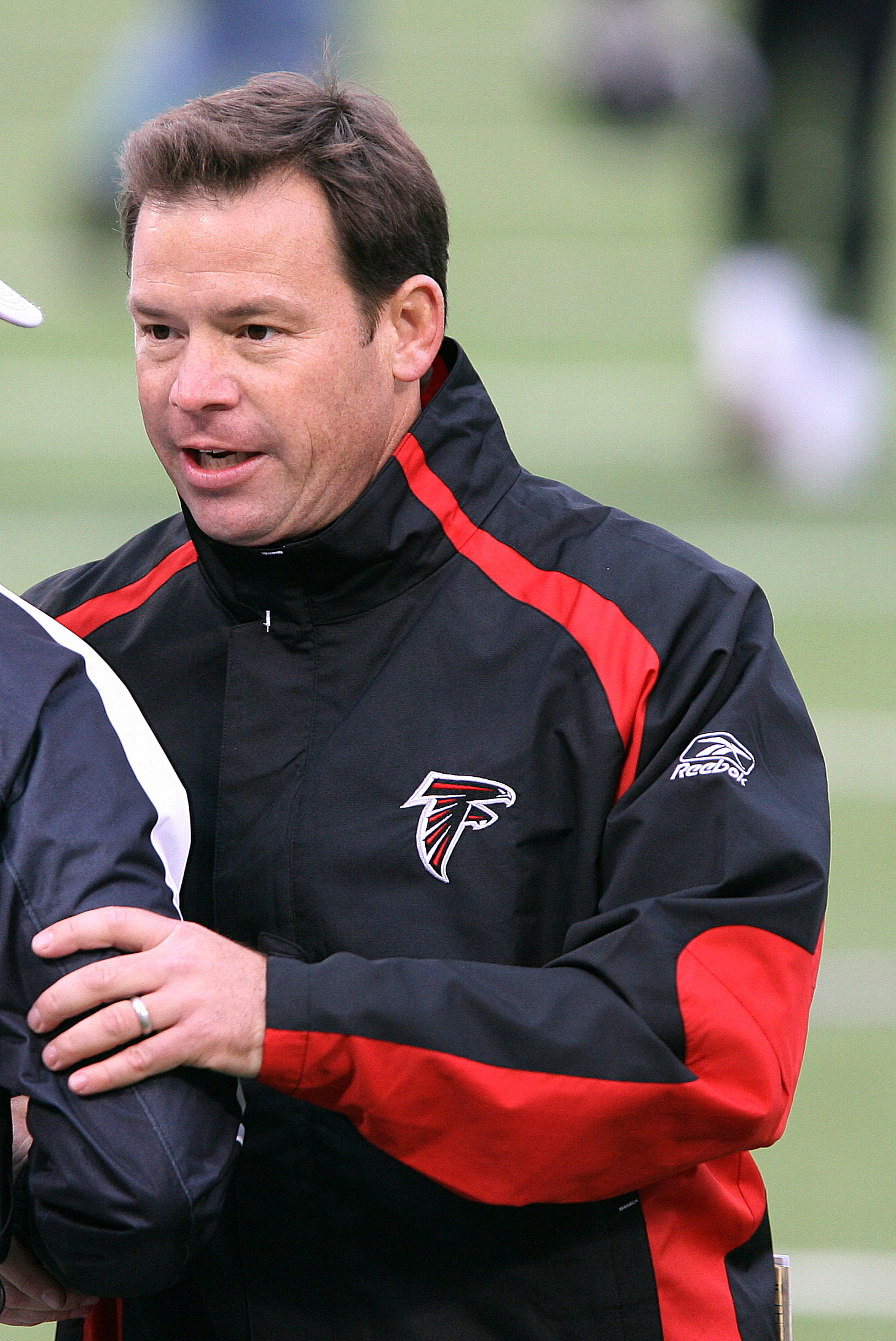
Head coach Jim L. Mora

- Jim L. Mora, head coach
- Noel Mazzone, offensive coordinator/quarterbacks
- Adrian Klemm, offensive line
- Lou Spanos, defensive coordinator
- Steve Broussard, running backs
- Jeff Ulbrich, special teams, linebackers
- Demetrice Martin, secondary
- Eric Yarber, wide receivers
- Angus McClure, defensive line/recruiting coordinator
- Taylor Mazzone, quarterbacks coach

== Rankings ==
Ranking movements Legend: ██ Increase in ranking ██ Decrease in ranking
| | Week | | | | | | | | | | | | | | | | |
| Poll | Pre | 1 | 2 | 3 | 4 | 5 | 6 | 7 | 8 | 9 | 10 | 11 | 12 | 13 | 14 | 15 | Final |
|---|---|---|---|---|---|---|---|---|---|---|---|---|---|---|---|---|---|
| AP | 21 | 18 | 16 | 13 | 13 | 12 | 11 | 9 | 12 | 17 | 16 | 13 | 14 | 22 | 17 | 17 | 16 |
| Coaches | 21 | 18 | 17 | 15 | 14 | 13 | 13 | 10 | 11 | 19 | 18 | 15 | 14 | 22 | 19 | 18 | 16 |
| Harris | Not released | | | | | | | 9 | 11 | 19 | 19 | 16 | 15 | 22 | 19 | 18 | Not released |
| BCS | Not released | | | | | | | | 12 | 20 | 19 | 13 | 14 | 22 | 18 | 17 | Not released |

== Awards and honors ==
- Anthony barr – Lott IMPACT Trophy
- Xavier Su'a-Filo – Pac-12 Morris Trophy (top lineman)

Eight Bruins were selected to the 2013 Pac-12 Conference Football All-Academic team:

== Notes ==
- September 8, 2013 – Freshman walk-on receiver Nick Pasquale was hit by a car and killed while walking in San Clemente. He was 20.
- September 14, 2013 – A record crowd of 91,471 attended the game at Nebraska
- September 16, 2013 – Anthony Barr, LB, was named Pac-12 defensive player of the week and the Walter Camp Football Foundation player of the week on defense
- September 21, 2013 – UCLA set new school records with 692 yards of total offense and 39 first downs in a game
- November 4, 2013 – No. 19 Jayon Brown was named Pac-12 special teams player of the week
- November 11, 2013 – Myles Jack, LB/RB, is Pac-12 Conference offensive player of the week following the Arizona game
- November 15, 2013 – Linebacker/running back Myles Jack became the first freshman to score four rushing touchdowns in a game for the UCLA
- November 25, 2013 – Defensive back Ishmael Adams was named Pac-12 special teams player of the week
- November 30, 2014 – Second consecutive win over the Trojans (35-14); Largest margin of victory (21-point) at the Coliseum in more than four decades (1970).
