= 2013 Sun Bowl =

American college football game

2013 Hyundai Sun Bowl
- 80th Sun Bowl
Virginia Tech Hokies	UCLA Bruins
(8–4)	(9–3)
ACC	Pac-12
12	42
Head coach: Frank Beamer	Head coach: Jim L. Mora
	AP / Coaches / BCS; 17 / 18 / 17
	1	2	3	4	Total
Virginia Tech	7	0	3	2	12
UCLA	7	7	0	28	42
- Date: December 31, 2013
- Season: 2013
- Stadium: Sun Bowl
- Location: El Paso, Texas
- MVP: Brett Hundley (QB), UCLA and Jordan Zumwalt (LB), UCLA; Lineman of the Game: Kenny Clark (NT), UCLA; Special Teams Player: Kaʻimi Fairbairn (K), UCLA
- Favorite: UCLA by 7
- Referee: Scott Novak (Big XII)
- Attendance: 47,912
- Payout: US$1.9 million per team

United States TV coverage
- Network: CBS; Nevada Sports Network
- Announcers: Verne Lundquist (play-by-play); Gary Danielson (analyst); Allie LaForce (sidelines)

The 2013 Sun Bowl was an American college football bowl game that was played on December 31, 2013, at Sun Bowl Stadium in El Paso, Texas. In this 80th edition of the Sun Bowl, the UCLA Bruins of the Pac-12 Conference met the Virginia Tech Hokies of the Atlantic Coast Conference. The game started at 12:00 noon MST, and was televised on CBS and heard on the Sports USA Radio Network. It was one of the 2013–14 bowl games that concluded the 2013 FBS football season. The game was sponsored by the Hyundai Motor Company and was officially known as the Hyundai Sun Bowl. UCLA defeated Virginia Tech 42-12 for the Sun Bowl Championship.

== Teams ==
UCLA finished the regular season with a record of 9–3 (6–3 Pac-12). Virginia Tech was 8–4 (5–3 ACC).

=== UCLA ===
The UCLA Bruins finished the season tied for second place in the South Division of Pac-12 Conference. They missed going to the Pac-12 championship game for the third time in a row when they lost the November 23, 2013 game to Arizona State. This is the fourth appearance in the Sun Bowl for UCLA.

Offensively, the team is led in rushing by Brett Hundley (150 carries for 587 yards, 3.91 avg., 9 TDs) and Paul Perkins (126 carries for 570 yards, 4.52 avg., 5 TDs), Hundley in passing (232 of 342 for 2,845 yards, 22 TDs, 9 INTs), and Shaquelle Evans in receiving (43 catches for 617 yards, 14.35 avg., 8 TDs). Anthony Barr, who has 10 sacks for 66 sack yards, and Eric Kendricks, who has 105 tackles (64 solo, 41 assisted), lead the defense.

=== Virginia Tech ===
For the Hokies, quarterback Logan Thomas has completed 224 of 391 passes for 2,861 yards for 16 touchdowns with 13 interceptions, third in the Atlantic Coast Conference this season. Trey Edmunds ran 166 times for 675 yards (4.07 avg.) and 10 touchdowns. Receiving the passes is Willie Byrn, who has caught 49 passes for 635 yards (12.96 avg.) for 2 touchdowns along with Demitri Knowles, who has 43 receptions for 619 yards (14.4 avg.) for 3 touchdowns. A. J. Hughes is second in the ACC in punting, averaging 44.5 yards in 69 punts. Jack Tyler has 93 tackles (32 solo), while Luther Maddy had 6 solo sacks and James Gayle with 5.5 sacks in 12 games.

== Game summary ==
=== Scoring summary ===
Scoring summary

Quarter	Time	Drive			Team	Scoring information	Score	
Quarter	Time	Plays	Yards	TOP	Team	Scoring information	Virginia Tech	UCLA
1	13:26	4	74	1:34	UCLA	Brett Hundley 7-yard touchdown run, Kaʻimi Fairbairn kick good	0	7
1	8:14	6	74	2:19	VT	J. C. Coleman 1-yard touchdown run, Michael Branthover kick good	7	7
2	9:17	2	90	0:34	UCLA	Hundley 86-yard touchdown run, Fairbairn kick good	7	14
3	3:53	4	8	1:32	VT	22-yard field goal by Branthover	10	14
4	14:20	12	85	4:33	UCLA	Paul Perkins 5-yard touchdown run, Fairbairn kick good	10	21
4	13:22	3	5	0:58	UCLA	Interception returned 24 yards for touchdown by Myles Jack, Fairbairn kick good	10	28
4	9:38	4	-4	1:49	VT	Sean Covington rush for a loss of 3 yards for a SAFETY.	12	28
4	7:31	2	10	1:02	UCLA	Thomas Duarte 8-yard touchdown reception from Hundley, Fairbairn kick good	12	35
4	5:49	2	74	0:27	UCLA	Shaquelle Evans 59-yard touchdown reception from Hundley, Fairbairn kick good	12	42
"TOP" = time of possession. For other American football terms, see Glossary of American football.							12	42

=== Statistics ===
Statistics	Virginia Tech	UCLA
First downs	16	22
Total offense, plays – yards	74–321	64–452
Rushes-yards (net)	38–145	36–197
Passing yards (net)	176	255
Passes, Comp-Att-Int	15–36–2	17–28–0
Time of Possession	35:03	24:47
