= Shak =

Shak may refer to:

- The Shak, a television series
- Shak (Hebrew: ש"ך), acronymic name given to Shabbatai ha-Kohen (1621–1662)
- Shake Shack (NYSE: SHAK), American restaurant chain
- Shak., abbreviation for William Shakespeare

== People ==
=== Given name ===
- Shak Adams (born 1998), American soccer player

=== Surname ===
- Beth Shak (born 1969), American poker player
- Dan Shak (born 1959), American poker player
- Steve Shak (born 1978), American soccer player
- Therese Wai Han Shak (1932–2010), Hong Kong teacher and nonprofit executive

== See also ==
- Shack (disambiguation)
- Shaki (disambiguation)
- Shaq (disambiguation)
