= Brett Hundley =

American football player (born 1993)

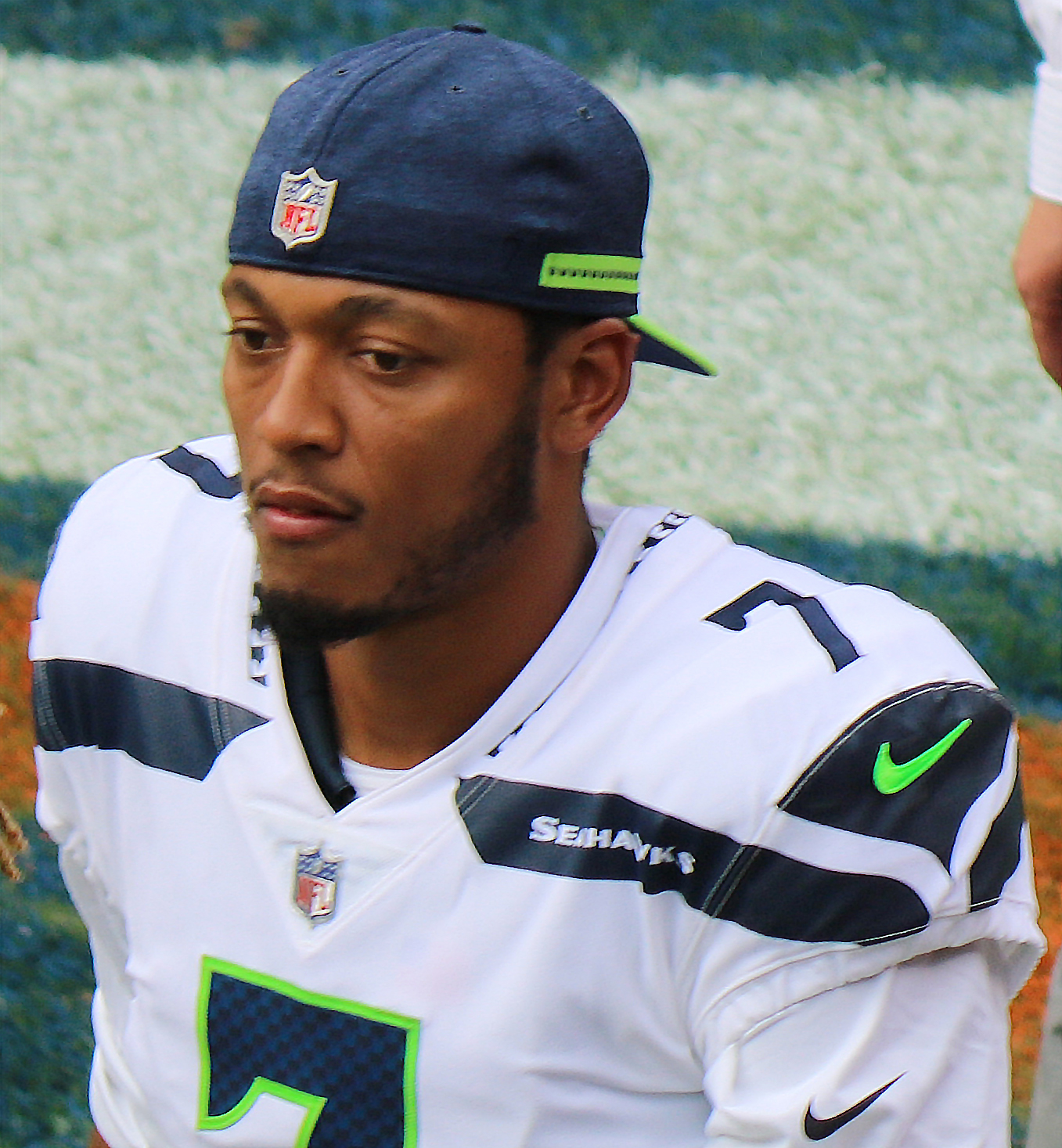
- Hundley with the Seattle Seahawks in 2018

No. 7, 3, 5, 15, 2
- Position: Quarterback

Personal information
- Born: June 15, 1993 (age 33); Phoenix, Arizona, U.S.
- Listed height: 6 ft 3 in (1.91 m)
- Listed weight: 226 lb (103 kg)

Career information
- High school: Chandler (Chandler, Arizona)
- College: UCLA (2011–2014)
- NFL draft: 2015: 5th round, 147th overall pick

Career history
- Green Bay Packers (2015–2017); Seattle Seahawks (2018); Arizona Cardinals (2019–2020); Indianapolis Colts (2021); Baltimore Ravens (2022)*; New Orleans Saints (2022)*; Baltimore Ravens (2022); Vegas Vipers (2023)
- * Offseason or practice squad member only

Awards and highlights
- Second-team All-Pac-12 (2014); Hendricks Trophy (Sun Bowl MVP) (2013)

Career NFL statistics
- Passing attempts: 337
- Passing completions: 199
- Completion percentage: 59.1%
- Passing yards: 1,902
- TD–INT: 9–13
- Passer rating: 67.6
- Rushing yards: 309
- Rushing touchdowns: 2
- Stats at Pro Football Reference

Brett Alan Hundley Jr. (born June 15, 1993) is an American former professional football player who was a quarterback in the National Football League (NFL). He played college football for the UCLA Bruins, finishing as the school's career leader in both total offense and touchdown passes. Hundley was selected by the Green Bay Packers in the fifth round of the 2015 NFL draft, and started nine games for them in 2017 following a collarbone injury to starter Aaron Rodgers. Hundley was also a member of the Seattle Seahawks, Arizona Cardinals, Indianapolis Colts, Baltimore Ravens, New Orleans Saints, and the Vegas Vipers of the XFL.

== Early life ==
Hundley attended Chandler High School in Chandler, Arizona, where he played high school football for the Wolves football team. As a junior, Hundley completed 107 of 170 passes for 1,517 yards, 16 touchdowns, and two interceptions. As a senior, he completed 139 of 225 passes for 2,348 yards, 20 touchdowns, and two interceptions. Hundley's overall record as a starter in high school was 16–8. He was ranked as the second best dual-threat quarterback recruit in his class by Rivals.com and committed to the University of California, Los Angeles (UCLA) to play college football.

== College career ==
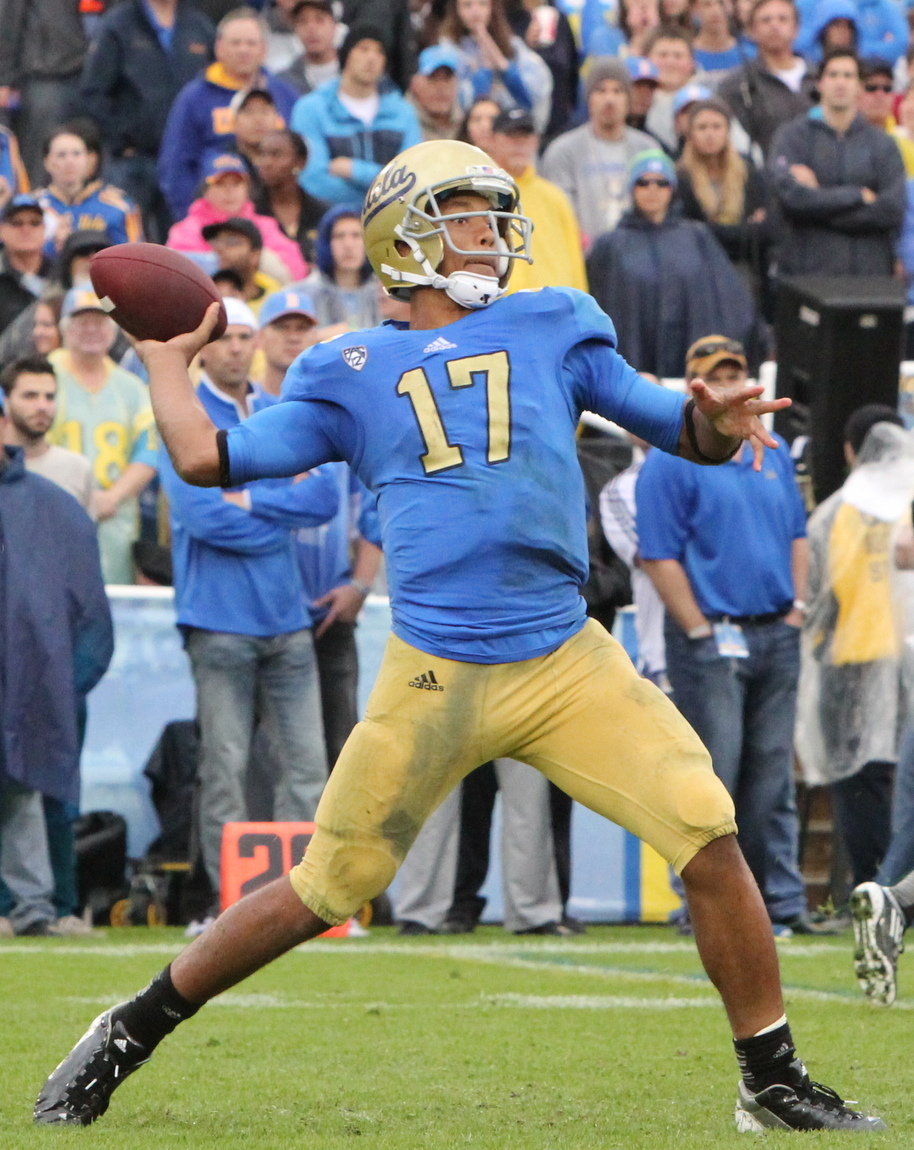
Hundley in 2012

After redshirting in 2011, Hundley was named the UCLA starting quarterback for the 2012 season. In his first college game against Rice, Hundley's first play was a 72-yard run for a touchdown that led to a 49–24 victory. In his second start against the No. 16 Nebraska Cornhuskers, Hundley had 305 passing yards and four touchdowns as UCLA upset the Cornhuskers 36–30 in their home opener. Hundley also helped UCLA defeat the USC Trojans 38–28 for the first time since 2006, passing for 234 yards and a touchdown while also rushing for two touchdowns. The Bruins advanced to the Pac-12 Football Championship Game against Stanford, but were defeated 27–24. UCLA finished the season with a record of 9–5, and were ranked No. 17 by the Associated Press. Hundley set a school single season record with 3,740 yards passing.

In 2013, Hundley led the Bruins to a 10-win season. The team beat USC, by a score of 35–14, marking consecutive wins over their crosstown rivals for the first time in over a decade. UCLA won the Sun Bowl, 42–12, over Virginia Tech with Hundley being named the game's co-most valuable player with teammate Jordan Zumwalt. Hundley ran for 161 yards and two touchdowns on just 10 carries while also throwing for 226 yards and another two scores. For the year, his 748 yards rushing were the school's third-most rushing yards in a season by a quarterback. Two NFL teams told Adam Schefter of ESPN that Hundley was potentially the top quarterback of the 2014 NFL draft if he left school early. However, Hundley elected to return for his junior year at UCLA. Leading up to the draft, some scouts questioned Hundley's passing accuracy and decision making.

Wary of the criticism of his passing skills, Hundley attempted to impress the pro scouts by running the ball less to begin the 2014 season. The team began the season undefeated at 4–0 until the No. 8 Bruins were upset 30–28 by the Utah Utes. In the game, Hundley was sacked a career-high 10 times, renewing concerns over his pocket awareness. Through 32 career games, Hundley was sacked 107 times, the highest among active Football Bowl Subdivision quarterbacks. He eventually ran more, including 24 carries for a season-high 131 yards in a 17–7 win over Arizona. Later in the season, Hundley became UCLA's all-time leader in touchdown passes, surpassing Cade McNown's record of 68; McNown's record came in four years as a starter (1995–1998), while Hundley broke the record in just his third season. Hundley also became the school's career leader in total offense, breaking McNown's previous mark of 11,285. Hundley was named to the All-Pac-12 second team. He finished his career with 9,966 passing yards, second in school history behind McNown. Hundley had also rushed for 1,747 career yards, behind only John Sciarra (1,813) among quarterbacks in UCLA history.

In December 2014, UCLA head coach Jim L. Mora announced that Hundley would forgo his senior season and enter the 2015 NFL draft.

Hundley later earned a bachelor’s degree in sociology from UCLA, after initially considering a premedical track.

== Professional career ==
Pre-draft measurables
Height	Weight	Arm length	Hand span	40-yard dash	10-yard split	20-yard split	20-yard shuttle	Three-cone drill	Vertical jump	Broad jump	Wonderlic
6 ft 3 1/4 in (1.91 m)	226 lb (103 kg)	32 1/8 in (0.82 m)	10 1/2 in (0.27 m)	4.63 s	1.62 s	2.72 s	3.98 s	6.93 s	36.0 in (0.91 m)	10 ft 0 in (3.05 m)	26
All values from NFL Combine

=== Green Bay Packers ===
==== 2015 season ====
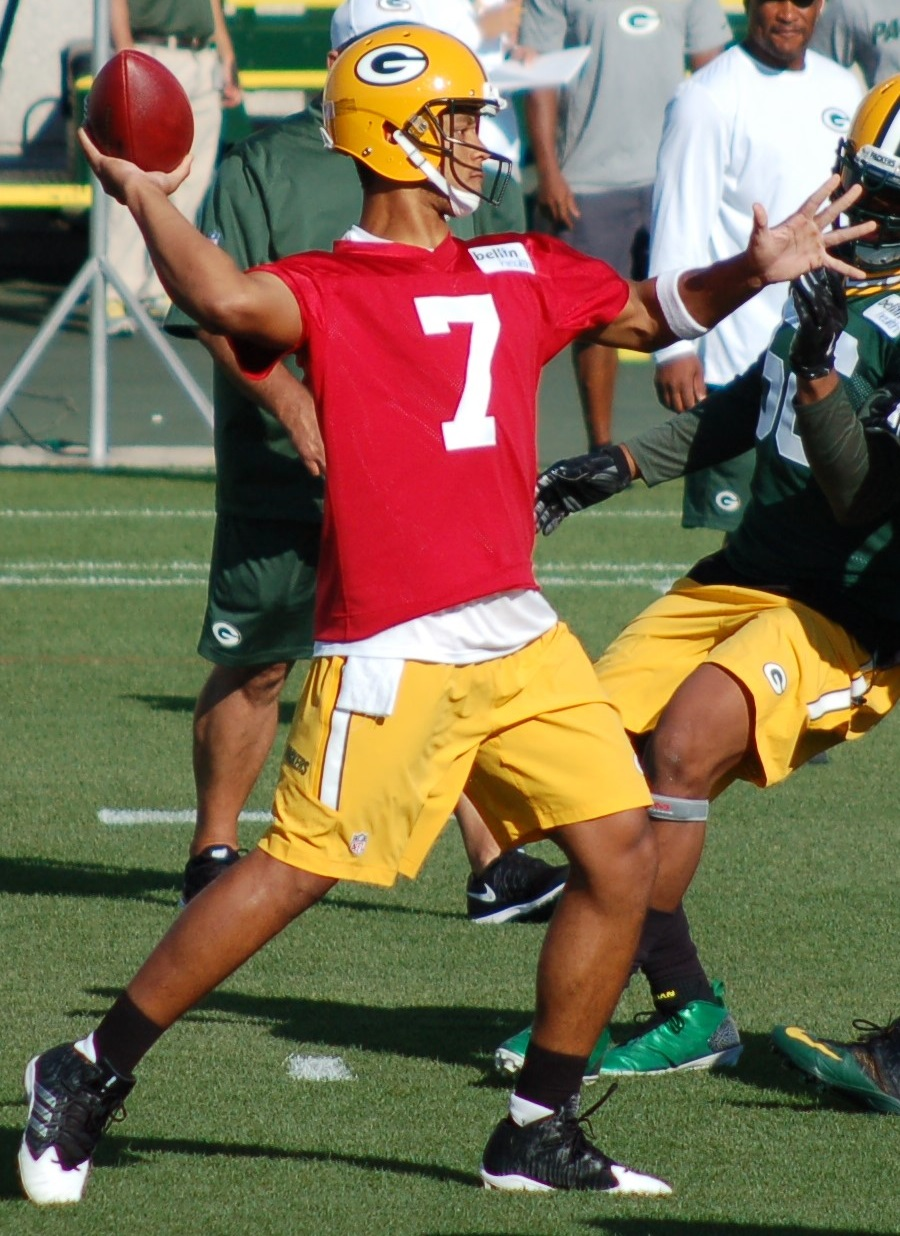
Hundley in 2015

Hundley was selected by the Green Bay Packers in the fifth round (147th overall) of the 2015 NFL draft, which was much later than expected. On May 7, 2015, the Packers officially signed him to a four-year rookie deal. Hundley was named the third-string quarterback on the depth chart behind veterans Aaron Rodgers and Scott Tolzien and saw no playing time as a rookie.

==== 2016 season ====
Hundley's success in the preseason and his off-the-field maturity eventually led to him being named the Packers' second-string quarterback after Tolzien's departure to the Indianapolis Colts in free agency.

During Week 10 against the Tennessee Titans, Hundley made his NFL debut and completed one-of-four passes for eight yards in the 47–25 road loss. In the next game against the Washington Redskins, he completed one-of-three passes for nine yards and an interception during the 42–24 road loss. Hundley only appeared in two other games later in the season, combining for three incompletions.

Hundley finished his second professional season with 17 passing yards and an interception in four games and no starts. During the NFC Championship Game against the Atlanta Falcons, Hundley had a 14-yard carry in the fourth quarter of the 44–21 road loss.

==== 2017 season ====
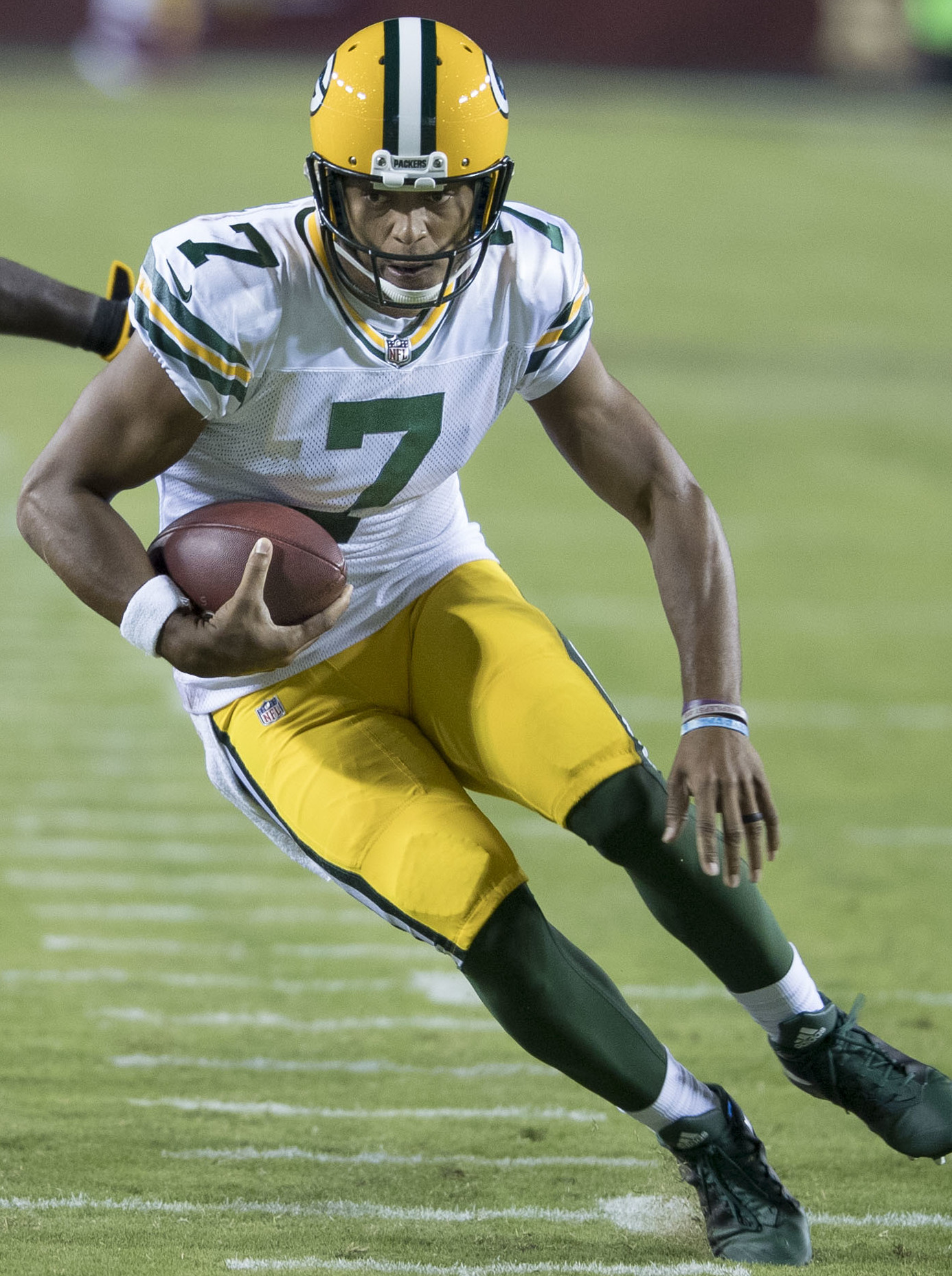
Hundley in 2017

During a Week 6 23–10 road loss to the Minnesota Vikings, Rodgers suffered a broken collarbone in the first quarter after being hit by linebacker Anthony Barr. As a result, Hundley entered the game, completing 18-of-33 passes for 157 yards, a touchdown, and three interceptions. After the game, head coach Mike McCarthy stated that Hundley would take over as the starter due to Rodgers' injury. In the next game against the New Orleans Saints, Hundley made his first career start and finished the 26–17 road loss completing 12-of-25 passes for just 87 yards and an interception with a passer rating under 40 for the second consecutive week, though he rushed thrice for 44 yards and a 14-yard touchdown.

Following a Week 8 bye, the Packers returned home to face the Detroit Lions on Monday Night Football. Hundley finished the 30–17 loss with 245 passing yards and a one-yard rushing touchdown. He continued this improvement in the next game against the Chicago Bears, completing 18-of-25 passes for 212 yards and a touchdown during the 23–16 road victory, marking his first career game with a 100+ passer rating despite playing through a hamstring injury. The following week against the Baltimore Ravens, Hundley had 200+ passing yards for the third consecutive game, throwing for 239 yards, but also committed three interceptions with no touchdowns in the 23–0 shutout loss.

During Week 12 against the Pittsburgh Steelers on Sunday Night Football, Hundley improved with 245 passing yards and three touchdowns for a 134.3 passer rating in the 31–28 road loss. In the next game against the Tampa Bay Buccaneers, he threw for only 84 yards and an interception while also rushing for 66 yards, with the Packers rushing for 199 total yards during the 26–20 overtime victory. The following week against the Cleveland Browns, Hundley completed 35-of-46 passes for a career-high 265 yards and three touchdowns in the 27–21 overtime road victory. Rodgers returned in Week 15 against the Carolina Panthers, but the Packers lost on the road 31–24 and were eliminated from postseason contention after the Atlanta Falcons beat the Buccaneers the following night.

On December 19, 2017, Rodgers was placed back on injured reserve, putting Hundley in line to be the starter for the rest of the season. Hundley struggled in the Week 16 16–0 shutout loss to the Vikings on Sunday Night Football, completing 17-of-40 passes for 130 yards and two interceptions. During the regular season finale against the Lions, he threw for 172 yards, a touchdown, and two interceptions while also throwing for a two-point conversion and catching his first career reception on a 10-yard pass from wide receiver Randall Cobb on a trick play in the 35–11 road loss.

Hundley finished the 2017 season with 1,836 passing yards, nine touchdowns, and 12 interceptions to go along with 36 carries for 270 yards and two touchdowns in 11 games and nine starts.

=== Seattle Seahawks ===
On August 29, 2018, Hundley was traded to the Seattle Seahawks for a sixth-round pick in the 2019 NFL draft (which was used on running back Dexter Williams). He became an unrestricted free agent at the end of the season and saw no playing time as the backup to Russell Wilson.

=== Arizona Cardinals ===
==== 2019 season ====
On March 14, 2019, Hundley signed a one-year, $1.88 million contract with the Arizona Cardinals. He served as the backup to rookie Kyler Murray, whom the Cardinals drafted first overall in 2019.

Hundley made his Cardinals debut during a Week 8 31–9 road loss to the Saints, where he had an incomplete pass and was sacked once. During Week 16 against his former team, the Seattle Seahawks, Hundley came in to relieve Murray after the latter suffered a hamstring injury. Hundley finished the 27–13 road victory completing four-of-nine passes for 49 yards to go along with six carries for 35 yards. In the regular-season finale against the Los Angeles Rams, he briefly relieved Murray and completed his lone pass attempt for six yards and had a six-yard carry during the 31–24 road loss.

==== 2020 season ====
On March 22, 2020, Hundley re-signed with the Cardinals on a one-year deal. He saw no playing time as the third-string quarterback behind Murray and backup Chris Streveler.

=== Indianapolis Colts ===
On July 31, 2021, Hundley signed with the Indianapolis Colts. He was released on August 31, but was re-signed to the practice squad the next day. On September 25, Hundley was elevated to the active roster, but returned to the practice squad two days later. On October 2, Hundley was once again elevated to the active roster and returned to the practice squad two days later. On October 10, he was signed to the active roster. Hundley was released on November 1, but was re-signed to the practice squad later that day. His contract expired when the team's season ended on January 9, 2022.

=== Baltimore Ravens (first stint) ===
On May 26, 2022, Hundley signed with the Baltimore Ravens. He was released on August 16.

=== New Orleans Saints ===
On November 2, 2022, the New Orleans Saints signed Hundley to their practice squad. He was released six days later.

=== Baltimore Ravens (second stint) ===
On December 5, 2022, Hundley signed with the Ravens' practice squad. He was elevated to the active roster on January 7, 2023, for the regular-season finale against the Cincinnati Bengals. Hundley's practice squad contract with the team expired after the season ended on January 15.

=== Vegas Vipers ===
On January 30, 2023, Hundley signed with the Vegas Vipers of the XFL. The following December, the Vipers folded when the XFL and United States Football League merged to create the United Football League (UFL), and Hundley went untaken in the subsequent dispersal draft. He was reportedly the XFL's highest-paid player during his time with the Vipers.

=== Retirement ===
On February 19, 2024, Hundley announced his retirement from professional football.

== Career statistics ==
=== NFL ===
==== Regular season ====
Year	Team	Games			Passing								Rushing				Sacks		Fumbles	
Year	Team	GP	GS	Record	Cmp	Att	Pct	Yds	Avg	TD	Int	Rtg	Att	Yds	Avg	TD	Sck	SckY	Fum	Lost
2015	GB	0	0	–	DNP															
2016	GB	4	0	–	2	10	20.0	17	1.7	0	1	0.0	3	−2	−0.7	0	0	0	1	0
2017	GB	11	9	3–6	192	316	60.8	1,836	5.8	9	12	70.6	36	270	7.5	2	29	197	4	2
2018	SEA	0	0	–	DNP															
2019	ARI	3	0	–	5	11	45.5	49	4.5	0	0	55.8	7	41	5.9	0	2	11	0	0
2020	ARI	0	0	–	DNP															
2021	IND	0	0	–	DNP															
2022	BAL	0	0	–	DNP															
Career		18	9	3–6	199	337	59.0	1,902	5.6	9	13	67.6	46	309	6.7	2	31	208	5	2

==== Postseason ====
Year	Team	Games		Passing								Rushing				Sacks		Fumbles	
Year	Team	GP	GS	Cmp	Att	Pct	Yds	Avg	TD	Int	Rtg	Att	Yds	Avg	TD	Sck	SckY	Fum	Lost
2015	GB	0	0	DNP															
2016	GB	1	0	0	0	0.0	0	0.0	0	0	0.0	1	14	14.0	0	0	0	0	0
2018	SEA	0	0	DNP															
2022	BAL	0	0	DNP															
Career		1	0	0	0	0.0	0	0.0	0	0	0.0	1	14	14.0	0	0	0	0	0

=== XFL ===
Year	Team	Games		Passing								Rushing			
Year	Team	GP	GS	Cmp	Att	Pct	Yds	Y/A	TD	Int	Rtg	Att	Yds	Avg	TD
2023	VGS	5	2	37	69	53.6	492	7.1	3	0	91.0	16	95	5.9	1

=== College ===
Season	Team	GP	Passing								Rushing			
Season	Team	GP	Cmp	Att	Pct	Yds	Y/A	TD	Int	Rtg	Att	Yds	Avg	TD
2012	UCLA	14	318	478	66.5	3,740	7.8	29	11	147.7	160	355	2.2	9
2013	UCLA	13	248	371	66.8	3,071	8.3	24	9	152.9	160	748	4.7	11
2014	UCLA	13	271	392	69.1	3,155	8.0	22	5	152.7	159	644	4.1	10
Career		40	837	1,241	67.4	9,966	8.0	75	25	150.8	479	1,747	3.6	30

== Personal life ==
Hundley is an Evangelical Christian. His father, Brett Sr., was a running back at the University of Arizona, and his uncle played quarterback at Wichita State University. Hundley is also a member of Kappa Alpha Psi.

Hundley's sister, Paris, deals with epilepsy. Since 2011, he has been involved with many charitable epilepsy organizations and fundraisers. Hundley founded the Hundley Foundation in 2019 to raise funds for epilepsy research. The foundation has since broadened its activities beyond epilepsy-related fundraising to include initiatives such as art therapy classes and fatherhood program. It has also supported efforts related to education, wellness, and mentorship, including providing meals to essential workers, awarding scholarships to high school and college students, and supporting research related to epilepsy and autism.

During his playing career, Hundley spent portions of the offseason traveling. Following his retirement, Hundley said he intended to do so more often.
