= Shaquille (disambiguation) =

Shaquille O'Neal (born 1972), is an American former professional basketball player and sports analyst.

Shaquille may also refer to:

- Shaquille (given name), includes variants Shaquill and Shaquil
- Shaquille (TV series), 2005 series featuring Shaquille O'Neal

== See also ==
- Shakeel (disambiguation)
- Shaq (disambiguation)
