= Shack (disambiguation) =

A shack is a type of small house, usually in a state of disrepair.

Shack or The Shack may also refer to:

== Places ==
- The Shack (Williamsport, Ohio), a Registered Historic Place in Pickaway County, Ohio, United States
- The Shack Neighborhood House, a community center in Scotts Run, West Virginia, United States

== People ==
- Shack (surname)
  - Shick Shack (c. 1727–c. 1835), Native American chieftain
- James "Shack" Harris (born 1947), former American Football League and National Football League quarterback and National Football League executive
- Shack Roberts, American enslaved man and politician
- Alonzo Shack Shealy (1874-1929), American college football player and head coach

== Arts, entertainment, and media ==
- The Shack (Blasco Ibáñez novel), an 1898 Spanish novel by Vicente Blasco Ibáñez
- The Shack (1945 film), a Mexican film adaptation of the Ibanez novel
- The Shack (Young novel), a 2007 novel by William P. Young
- The Shack (2017 film), an American film adaptation of the Young novel
- Shack (band), an English alternative rock group formed in 1987
- Shack, the villain of the movie Emperor of the North Pole (1973), played by Ernest Borgnine
- Shacknews, a website about games, also known as The Shack
- The Shack (journalism), the police beat for journalists within the NYPD headquarters

== Other uses ==
- Radio shack, a structure or room used for housing radio equipment

== See also ==
- Shaquille O'Neal, American basketball player nicknamed Shaq
- Shaq (disambiguation)
