= Ellis McCarthy =

American football player (born 1994)

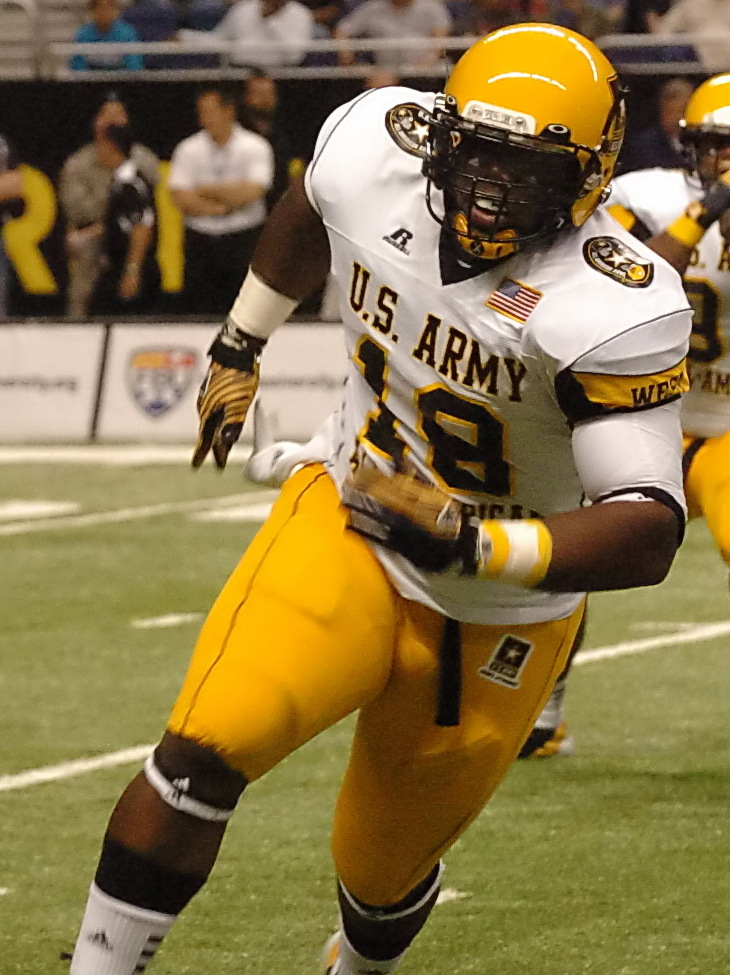
- McCarthy at the 2012 U.S. Army All-American Bowl

No. 73
- Position: Defensive tackle

Personal information
- Born: July 13, 1994 (age 32); Monrovia, California, U.S.
- Listed height: 6 ft 4 in (1.93 m)
- Listed weight: 330 lb (150 kg)

Career information
- High school: Monrovia (CA)
- College: UCLA
- NFL draft: 2015: undrafted

Career history
- Miami Dolphins (2015)*
- * Offseason or practice squad member only
- Stats at Pro Football Reference

Ellis Lamar McCarthy (born July 13, 1994) is an American former football defensive tackle. He played college football with the UCLA Bruins.

== Early life ==
McCarthy played football at Monrovia High School for coach Ryan Maddox, where he was an All-American defensive tackle. He also played in the U.S. Army All-American Bowl in San Antonio, where he had originally committed to California. He was named to the first-team USA Today All-American squad. He was an All-CIF Mid-Valley Division selection at defensive line. He helped his team post a 23-5 record over his senior and junior seasons. He was the Pasadena Star-News Two-time Defensive Player of the Year. As a junior, he was credited with 69 tackles and 11 sacks. He made 55 tackles, five sacks, three fumble recoveries as a senior. He was named U.S. Air Force Medium Schools second-team All-American.

Also a standout track & field athlete, McCarthy was one of the state's top performers in the throwing events. He posted personal-bests of 17.94 (58 ft, 8 in) meters in the shot put and 52.44 meters (172 ft) in the discus.

Regarded as a five-star recruit by Rivals.com, McCarthy was ranked as the No. 4 defensive tackle prospect in his class, named No. 10 defensive lineman in the nation according to SuperPrep and the No. 8 player in the CA/NV/HI region. Rated as the No. 21 recruit in the nation and No. 2 recruit in California according to Rivals.com, as well as the nation's No. 4 defensive tackle. A five-star recruit according to Scout.com and the nation's No. 2 defensive tackle. He was also an All-American according to Tom Lemming.

== College career ==
McCarthy played as a true freshman for the UCLA Bruins. In 2013, he made 31 tackles, including two for a loss, and was named the team's most improved player on defense. He was also named an All-Pac-12 honorable mention. He did not start any games in 2014, making 21 tackles and three sacks while playing behind Kenny Clark and Eddie Vanderdoes. After the season, McCarthy entered for the NFL draft, which surprised many, considering the fact that he did not start in 2014. He made eight career starts for the Bruins.

== See also ==
- USA Today All-USA high school football team
