= Shaquille (given name) =

Shaquille, Shaquill, or Shaquil is a given name, with Shaq being a common nickname. It is derived from the Arabic name Shakil.

Notable people with the name include:

- Shaquil Barrett (born 1992), American football player
- Shaquil Delos (born 1999), French footballer
- Shaquille Dyer (born 1995), Jamaican footballer
- Shaquill Griffin (born 1995), American football cornerback player also known as Shaq Griffin
- Shaquille Harrison (born 1993), American basketball player
- Shaquille Hunter (born 1995), English footballer
- Shaquille Murray-Lawrence (born 1993), Canadian football player in the Canadian Football League
- Shaquille O'Neal (born 1972), American basketball player
- Shaquille Paranihi-Ngauma (born 1993), New Zealand singer
- Shaquille Pinas (born 1998), Surinamese footballer
- Shaquille Quarterman (born 1997), American football player
- Shaquille Richardson (born 1992), American football player in the NFL and CFL
- Shaquille Riddick (born 1993), American football player in the NFL
- Shaquill Sno (born 1996), Dutch footballer
- Shaquille Vance (born 1991), American sprinter
- Shaquille Lawson (born 1994), American football player
- Shaquille Thompson (born 1994), American football player
- Shaquille Mason (born 1993), American football player

== See also ==
- Shaquelle Evans (born 1991), American football player
- Shaquell Moore (born 1996), American soccer player
- Shakeel (name), given name and surname
- Shaq (disambiguation) § People
