= Shakeel (disambiguation) =

Shakeel (born 1938) is a Pakistani actor.

Shakeel may also refer to:

- Shakeel (horse) (born 2014), French Thoroughbred racehorse and sire.
- Shakeel (name), given and surname
- Shakeel, fictional character portrayed by Varinder Singh Ghuman in the 2023 Indian film Tiger 3

== See also ==
- Shaquille (disambiguation)
