= Shaq (disambiguation) =

Shaquille O'Neal (born 1972) is an American sports analyst, rapper, and former professional basketball player.

Shaq may also refer to:

- A given name or nickname derived from Shaquille, which in turn is derived from the Arabic name Shakil

== People ==
- Shaq Barrett (born 1992), American football linebacker
- Shaq Buchanan (born 1997), American basketball player
- Shaq Calhoun (born 1996), American football player
- Shaq Cooper (born 1993), American football player
- Shaq Coulthirst (born 1994), English footballer
- Shaq Evans (born 1991), American football wide receiver
- Shaq Forde (born 2004), English footballer
- Shaq Griffin (born 1995), American football cornerback player
- Shaq Johnson (born 1993), Canadian football wide receiver player
- Shaq Lawson (born 1994), American football defensive end player
- Shaq Mason (born 1993), American football offensive guard player
- Shaq McDonald (born 1995), English footballer
- Shaq Moore (born 1996), American soccer player
- Shaq Richardson (born 1992), Canadian football defensive back player
- Shaq Roland (born 1993), American football wide receiver
- Shaq Thompson (born 1994), American football linebacker

== Others ==
- Shaq (film), (also known as Shukk), 2013 Pakistani mystery drama, aired on ARY Digital, and directed by Yasir Nawaz
- Shaq Qureshi, a fictional character from the British soap opera Hollyoaks

== See also ==
- Big Shaq, alias of British entertainer Michael Dapaah
- Shaquille (disambiguation)
- Shakeel (disambiguation)
