= Shaki =

Shaki may refer to:

- Shaki, Armenia, a village in Armenia
- Shaki, Azerbaijan, a city in Azerbaijan
- Shaki District, a district in Azerbaijan
- Shaki Khanate (1743–1819), a khanate in the territory of modern Azerbaijan
- Shaki, Oyo State, a city in Nigeria
- Shaki, another name for tripe, especially in West Africa

== See also ==
- Saki (disambiguation)
- Shak (disambiguation)
- Shakira (born 1977), Colombian pop singer-songwriter
