= Eddie Vanderdoes =

American football player (born 1994)

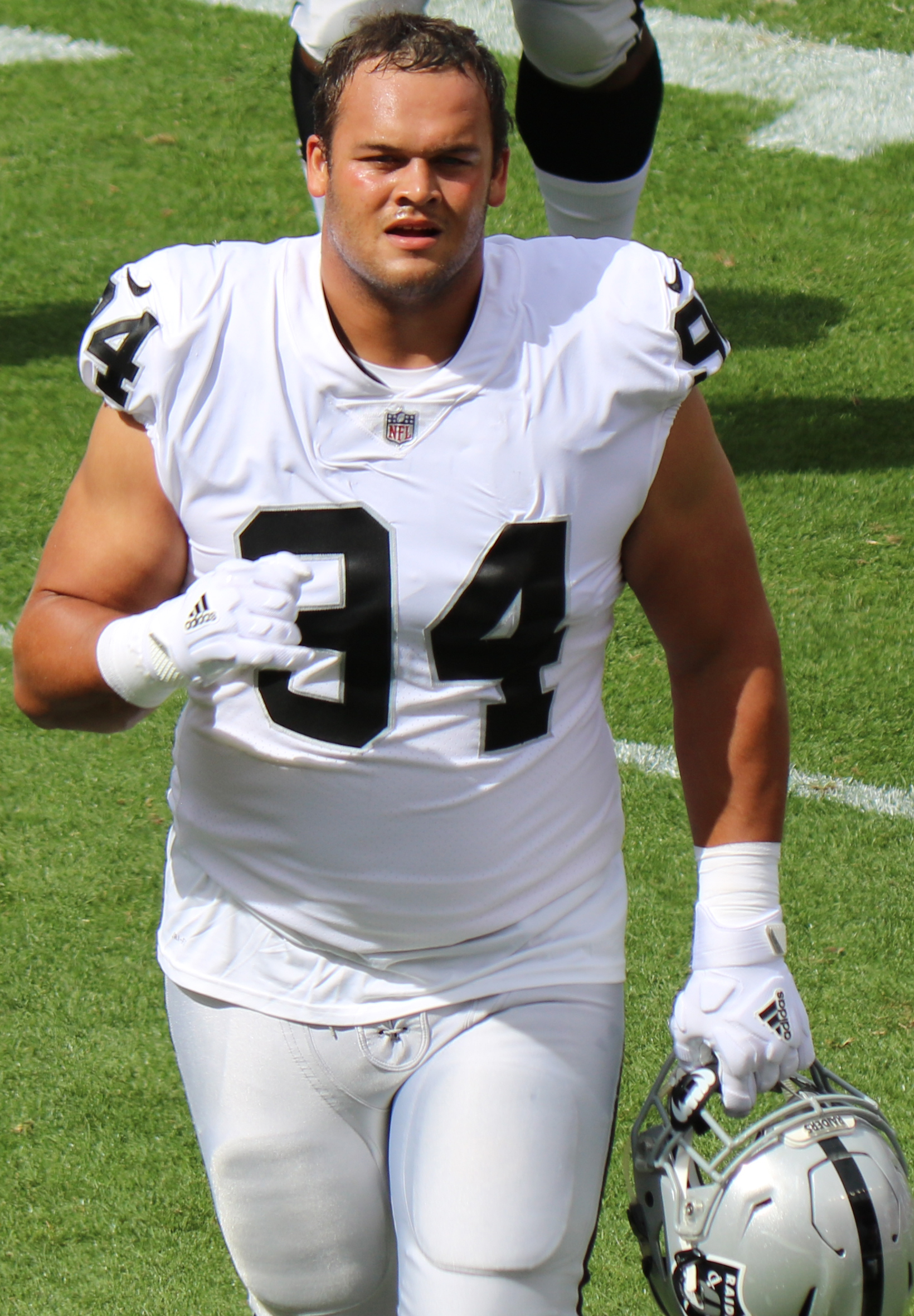
- Vanderdoes with the Oakland Raiders in 2017

No. 94, 95
- Position: Defensive tackle

Personal information
- Born: October 13, 1994 (age 32); Auburn, California, U.S.
- Listed height: 6 ft 3 in (1.91 m)
- Listed weight: 315 lb (143 kg)

Career information
- High school: Placer (Auburn)
- College: UCLA
- NFL draft: 2017: 3rd round, 88th overall pick

Career history
- Oakland Raiders (2017–2019); Houston Texans (2019–2020); San Francisco 49ers (2021)*
- * Offseason or practice squad member only

Awards and highlights
- Freshman All-America (2013)

Career NFL statistics
- Total tackles: 26
- Stats at Pro Football Reference

Eddie Norman Vanderdoes IV (born October 13, 1994) is an American former professional football player who was a nose tackle in the National Football League (NFL). He played college football for the UCLA Bruins, where he was named first-team Freshman All-America.

== College career ==
Vanderdoes originally signed a National Letter of Intent in February 2013 to play college football with Notre Dame. However, he asked to be released due to family reasons and academic concerns, but Fighting Irish coach Brian Kelly refused to release him. Vanderdoes wanted to play for UCLA and appealed his case, which resulted in the National Collegiate Athletic Association (NCAA) National Letter of Intent Appeals Committee granting him immediate eligibility to play for the Bruins.

As a true freshman in 2013, Vanderdoes was named first-team Freshman All-America by Sporting News and the Football Writers' Association. He played in all 13 games, starting in seven, and made 40 tackles with two sacks. He even rushed for a touchdown on offense. As a sophomore in 2014, Vanderdoes was an honorable mention All-Pac-12 Conference selection for the second straight year after recording 50 tackles, 5 1/2 tackles for a loss, and three sacks. He also added another rushing touchdown. In the Bruins' season opener in 2015, he tore the anterior cruciate ligament in his knee and was ruled out for the season. He had a team-high 11 tackles and 3 for loss in the 34–16 win over Virginia. His last play was on offense in a goal-line play, when he lifted 310-pound (140 kg) Kenny Clark and collapsed after his fellow defender had scored a three-yard touchdown on the play. UCLA said Vanderdoes' knee "locked up on him" earlier in the game, and did not suffer the injury during the celebration.

== Professional career ==
Pre-draft measurables
Height	Weight	Arm length	Hand span	40-yard dash	10-yard split	20-yard split	20-yard shuttle	Three-cone drill	Vertical jump	Broad jump	Bench press	Wonderlic
6 ft 3 1/8 in (1.91 m)	305 lb (138 kg)	33 1/8 in (0.84 m)	10 5/8 in (0.27 m)	4.99 s	1.70 s	2.85 s	4.39 s	7.69 s	28.5 in (0.72 m)	9 ft 3 in (2.82 m)	28 reps	20
All value from NFL Combine

=== Oakland Raiders ===
Vanderdoes was selected by the Oakland Raiders in the third round (88th overall) of the 2017 NFL draft. He signed his rookie contract, a four-year deal worth $3.16 million, on July 5, 2017.

On September 1, 2018, Vanderdoes was placed on the physically unable to perform (PUP) list to start the 2018 season after recovering from a torn ACL he suffered in the 2017 season finale. After returning from practice in October, Vanderdoes was ultimately not activated from the PUP list, officially ending his 2018 season.

Vanderdoes was waived/injured during final roster cuts on August 30, 2019, and reverted to the team's injured reserve list on September 1. He was waived from the injured reserve on October 1.

=== Houston Texans ===
On October 28, 2019, Vanderdoes was signed to the practice squad of the Houston Texans. He was promoted to the active roster on November 30, 2019. On December 1, Vanderdoes made his first appearance in an NFL game since 2017, in which the Texans played the New England Patriots. On December 21, Vanderdoes played 18 snaps during the Texans 23–20 win against the Tampa Bay Buccaneers.

On July 28, 2020, Vanderdoes announced he was opting out of the 2020 season due to the COVID-19 pandemic. He was released after the season with a non-football injury designation on February 24, 2021.

=== San Francisco 49ers ===
On August 12, 2021, Vanderdoes signed one-year contract with the San Francisco 49ers, but was waived few days later.
