= Shack (surname) =

Shack is a surname. Notable people with the surname include:

- Eddie Shack (1937–2020), Canadian retired National Hockey League player
- Joe Shack (1915–1987), Canadian National Hockey League player
- Peter Shack (born 1953), Australian retired politician
- Ruth Shack (1931–2026), American human rights activist
