= Shakeel (name) =

Shakeel or Shakil is a name of Arabic etymology that means "handsome". It may refer to the following people:

== Given name ==
- Shakil Afridi, a Pakistani physician
- Shakil Ahmed (Major General), Bangladeshi Army personnel
- Shakil Ahmed (footballer, born 1988), Bangladeshi national footballer
- Shakil Ahmed (sport shooter), Bangladeshi sport shooter
- Shakeel Bhat, a Muslim activist
- Shakil Kazemi, character in the BBC soap opera EastEnders
- Shakeel Khan (cricketer, born 1952), Pakistani cricketer and umpire
- Shakeel Khan (cricketer, born 1968), Pakistani cricketer
- Mir Shakil-ur-Rahman, a Pakistani businessman
- Shakeel Siddiqui, Pakistani stage comedian
- Shakeil Luciano British DJ

== Surname ==
- Shakeel, IAF officer
- Chhota Shakeel, Indian mobster

== See also ==
- Shaquille (given name)
- Shaq (disambiguation) § People
