= Kenneth Walker III (wide receiver) =

American football player (born 1994)

No. 10
- Position: Wide receiver

Personal information
- Born: April 1, 1994 (age 32); Brookside, California, U.S.
- Listed height: 5 ft 9 in (1.75 m)
- Listed weight: 188 lb (85 kg)

Career information
- High school: John F. Kennedy (Richmond, California)
- College: UCLA (2012–2016)
- NFL draft: 2017: undrafted

Career history
- Jacksonville Jaguars (2017)*; Arizona Hotshots (2019)*; Winnipeg Blue Bombers (2019); Pittsburgh Maulers (2022)
- * Offseason or practice squad member only

Awards and highlights
- Grey Cup champion (2019)

Kenneth Walker III (born April 1, 1994) is an American former football wide receiver. He played college football for the UCLA Bruins from 2012 to 2016. He played professionally for the Winnipeg Blue Bombers of the Canadian Football League (CFL) and the Pittsburgh Maulers of the United States Football League (USFL). He was also a sprinter on the UCLA track and field team.

== Early life ==
Walker was born outside of the San Francisco Bay Area in Brookside, California, to Patricia Jones and Kenneth Walker II. He grew up in the East Bay in the dangerous Iron Triangle neighborhood of Richmond. His parents separated when he was in the seventh grade, and his mom raised Walker and his two older brothers as a single parent. In an attempt to keep her youngest out of trouble, she sent him to live in Oakley with his father, who had remarried. There, Walker excelled in both track and football at Freedom High School.

After Walker's sophomore year, his father divorced, and they moved back to Richmond with his mother. At Richmond's John F. Kennedy High School, he won three Junior Olympics titles in the hurdles and became an excellent student and a top-rated high school football player. He received playing time in high school as a running back, receiver, punter, kick returner and quarterback.

According to ESPN, Walker received more than 12 scholarship offers to play college football. He orally committed in August 2011 to the University of California, Berkeley. However, he began to reconsider after Cal receivers coach Eric Kiesau left the school. In February 2012, Walker switched his commitment to the University of California, Los Angeles.

== College athletics ==
Walker enrolled at UCLA in 2012 and played at the wide receiver position for the Bruins football team. He appeared in 12 games as a true freshman in 2012, missed the 2013 season with a back injury, and appeared in nine games in 2014, 13 games in 2015, and 11 games in 2016. He started nine games for UCLA in 2015 and seven in 2016. Walker had two 100-yard receiving games during the 2016 season: 115 yards and a touchdown on six receptions against Texas A&M on September 3; and 114 yards and two touchdowns on two receptions against Arizona on October 1.

Walker also competed as a sprinter for the UCLA track team.

== Professional career ==
Pre-draft measurables
Height	Weight	Arm length	Hand span	40-yard dash	10-yard split	20-yard split	20-yard shuttle	Three-cone drill	Vertical jump	Broad jump	Bench press
5 ft 9 3/8 in (1.76 m)	188 lb (85 kg)	30 1/2 in (0.77 m)	8 3/8 in (0.21 m)	4.30 s	1.50 s	2.53 s	4.40 s	7.28 s	32.0 in (0.81 m)	9 ft 7 in (2.92 m)	19 reps
All values from Pro Day

Walker was signed by the Jacksonville Jaguars as an undrafted free agent following the 2017 NFL draft. He was waived on August 14, 2017.

In 2018, Walker signed with the Arizona Hotshots for the inaugural 2019 season of the Alliance of American Football (AAF), but was waived in January 2019 as part of the final roster cuts before the season opener.

Walker signed with the Winnipeg Blue Bombers of the Canadian Football League (CFL) on March 18, 2019. He was released during final roster cuts on June 9, but was re-signed to the team's practice roster the same day. Walker was promoted to the active roster on July 18 to replace injured kick returner Charles Nelson. In his first CFL game in Week 6, he returned nine punts for 97 yards and one kickoff for 26 against the Ottawa Redblacks. In the following week versus the Hamilton Tiger-Cats, Walker fumbled one punt return and had another fumble overturned on a penalty. He also received playing time at receiver after in-game injuries to their corps. After his off game, he was replaced in the lineup by Janarion Grant. The Blue Bombers won the 107th Grey Cup against Hamilton with Walker on the practice roster.

Walker signed with the Pittsburgh Maulers of the United States Football League (USFL) on May 6, 2022. He was released four days later.
