= Jordan Zumwalt =

American football player (born 1991)

No. 56, 49
- Position: Linebacker

Personal information
- Born: October 13, 1991 (age 35); La Habra, California, U.S.
- Listed height: 6 ft 4 in (1.93 m)
- Listed weight: 231 lb (105 kg)

Career information
- High school: Huntington Beach (CA) Edison
- College: UCLA
- NFL draft: 2014: 6th round, 192nd overall pick

Career history
- Pittsburgh Steelers (2014–2015)
- Stats at Pro Football Reference

Jordan Dean Zumwalt (born October 13, 1991) is an American former football player. He played college football at UCLA, and was selected by the Pittsburgh Steelers in the sixth round of the 2014 NFL draft.

== Early life ==
Zumwalt attended Edison High School in Huntington Beach, California. He was named to the EA Sports All-American second-team while in high school. He was named as an honorable mention for the Long Beach Press-Telegram Best in the West. He was selected as the GoldenStatePreps.com SoCal Defensive Player of the Year. He was selected to the MaxPreps All-California first-team. On January 3, 2010, he was selected to the L.A. Times All-Star team. On December 22, 2009, he was selected as the Orange County Register Defensive Player of the Year and on February 3, 2010, CIF-SS Pac-5 Division Defensive Player of the Year following his senior year. He also lettered in basketball and wrestling. After originally committing to Stanford, he chose UCLA.

Zumwalt was ranked as the 4th best inside linebacker and the 205th national overall prospect by Rivals.com, as well as the 29th best player in California. He also was ranked as the 267th national prospect and the 9th best middle linebacker prospect by Scout.com. He was ranked as the 38th best prospect by Scout along with being ranked 43rd best player in CA/NV/HI region by SuperPrep.

College recruiting
Name	Hometown	School	Height	Weight	40^{‡}	Commit date
Jordan Zumwalt; Inside linebacker	Huntington Beach, California	Edison High School	6 ft 4 in (1.93 m)	220 lb (100 kg)	4.6	Feb 3, 2010
Jordan Zumwalt; Inside linebacker	Recruit ratings: Scout: Rivals:					
Overall recruit ranking: Scout: 9 (MLB) Rivals: 205 (National), 4 (ILB), 29 (Cal)
‡ Refers to 40-yard dash; Note: In many cases, Scout, Rivals, 247Sports, On3, and ESPN may conflict in their listings of height, weight and 40 time.; In these cases, the average was taken. ESPN grades are on a 100-point scale.; Sources: "UCLA Football Commitments". Rivals.; "2010 UCLA Football Recruiting Commits". Scout.; "Scout.com Team Recruiting Rankings". Scout.; "2010 Team Ranking". Rivals.com.

== College career ==
Zumwalt was selected to the rivals.com Pac-10 All-Freshman team following his freshman season. He was also the Defensive tri-winner of UCLA's John Boncheff, Jr. Memorial Award for Rookie of the Year following the season.

Zumwalt finished his sophomore season with 60 tackles, 1 interception and 1 pass deflections. On January 13, 2012, he was selected to the ESPN All-Pac-12 Bowl Team.

On December 31, 2013, Zumwalt was named as co-MVP of the 2013 Hyundai Sun Bowl. He was an Honorable Mention pick for the Pac-12 all-conference team. His other postseason awards included the 2013 Sports Illustrated all bowl team, Senior Bowl attendee, and a spot at the 2013 NFL Combine.

== Professional career ==
On May 10, 2014, the Pittsburgh Steelers selected Zumwalt 192nd overall in the sixth round of the 2014 NFL draft. He was placed on the injured reserve list before the 2014 and 2015 regular seasons.

On August 28, 2016, he was waived by the Steelers.
