= Anthony Barr (American football) =

American football player (born 1992)

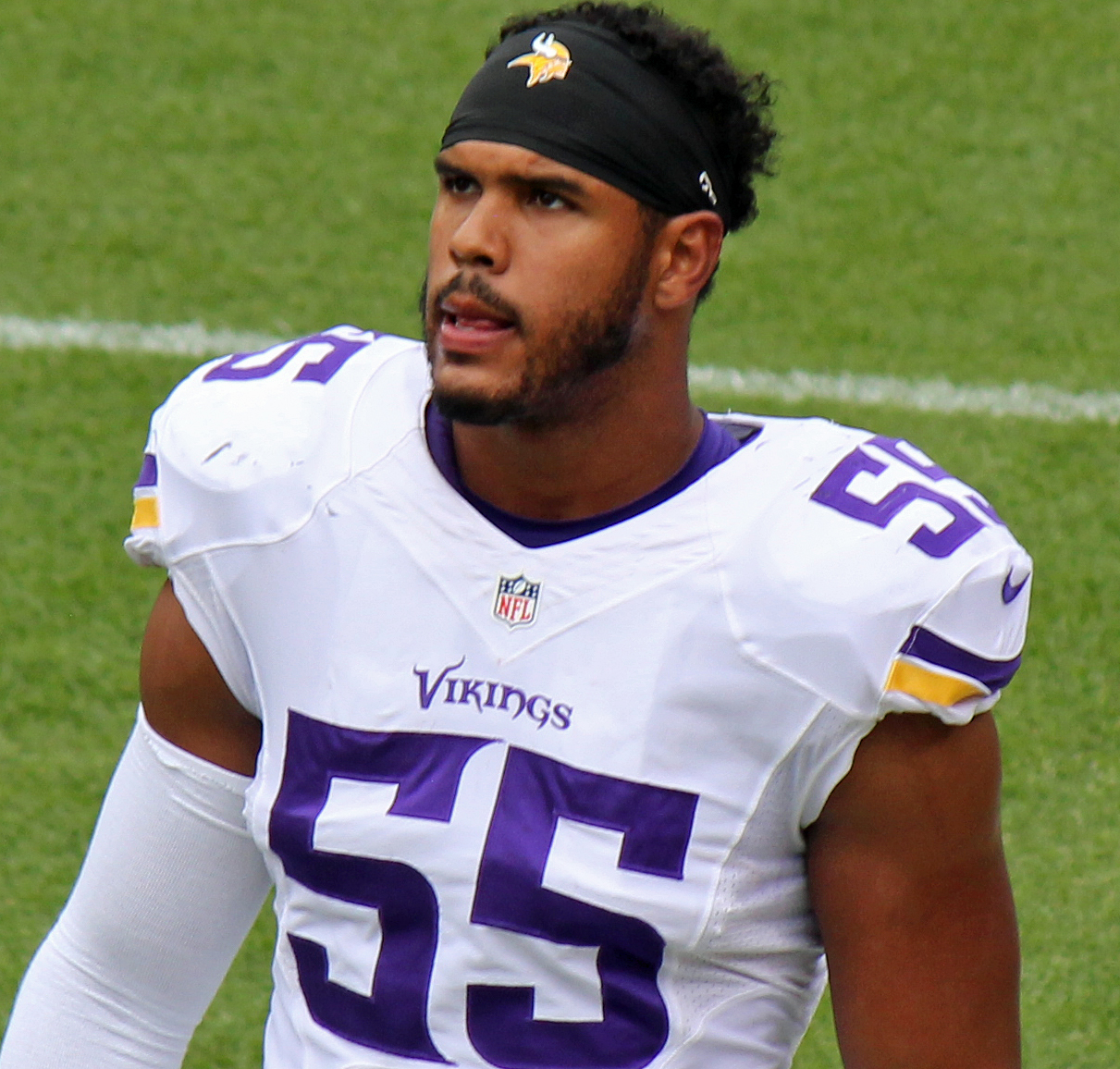
- Barr with the Minnesota Vikings in 2015

No. 55, 42, 51, 54
- Position: Linebacker

Personal information
- Born: March 18, 1992 (age 34); South Bend, Indiana, U.S.
- Listed height: 6 ft 5 in (1.96 m)
- Listed weight: 257 lb (117 kg)

Career information
- High school: Loyola (Los Angeles, California)
- College: UCLA (2010–2013)
- NFL draft: 2014: 1st round, 9th overall pick

Career history
- Minnesota Vikings (2014–2021); Dallas Cowboys (2022); Minnesota Vikings (2023)

Awards and highlights
- 4× Pro Bowl (2015–2018); Lott Trophy (2013); Consensus All-American (2013); 2× First-team All-Pac-12 (2012, 2013)

Career NFL statistics
- Total tackles: 554
- Sacks: 18.5
- Forced fumbles: 8
- Fumble recoveries: 10
- Interceptions: 5
- Pass deflections: 32
- Defensive touchdowns: 1
- Stats at Pro Football Reference

Anthony Barr (born March 18, 1992) is an American former professional football player who was a linebacker in the National Football League (NFL). He played college football for the UCLA Bruins from 2010 to 2013, earning consensus All-American honors in 2013. He was selected by the Minnesota Vikings in the first round, ninth overall of the 2014 NFL draft.

Barr was an offensive player his first two years at UCLA, playing running back, wide receiver, and tight end. He struggled as a running back, and switched to linebacker during his junior year, at which position he was named a first-team All-Pac-12 selection and to the CBSSports.com All-America second-team. As a senior Barr received the Lott IMPACT Award after leading the team in sacks.

In 2014, Barr's first season playing professional football in the NFL, he was named National Football Conference (NFC) Defensive Player of the Week for Week 8 and selected for the Pro Football Focus All-NFC North Team. His rookie season was cut short due to a knee injury. Following that season he made four consecutive Pro Bowl appearances (2015–2018). In the spring of 2019, he signed a five-year extension of his contract with the Vikings.

== Early life ==
Barr was born in South Bend, Indiana, but raised in Los Angeles, where he attended Loyola High School in the Pico-Union neighborhood. He was a letterman in football and track, and was an All-State selection at running back for the Loyola Cubs football team after rushing for 1,890 yards and 20 touchdowns as a junior. However, he missed virtually all of his senior season after breaking his ankle in the September, and was also unable to participate in the 2010 U.S. Army All-American Bowl, to which he was invited.

Barr also lettered four seasons in track and field. At the 2009 CIF Southern Prelims, he earned 11th-place finishes in both the 100 meter (11.01 s) and the 200 meter (22.40 s) dashes. He took silver in the 200 meter dash at the 2009 Mission League Championships, recording a personal-best time of 21.86 seconds.

Regarded as a four-star recruit by Rivals.com, Barr was listed as the No. 8 prospect and the No. 5 athlete out of the state of California. According to Scout.com, he was ranked as the No. 100 national prospect and the No. 10 outside linebacker. He was also rated as the No. 1 athlete by MaxPreps. With scholarship offers from dozens of schools, Barr narrowed his decision down to Notre Dame and UCLA, before choosing the Bruins on January 21, 2010.

== College career ==
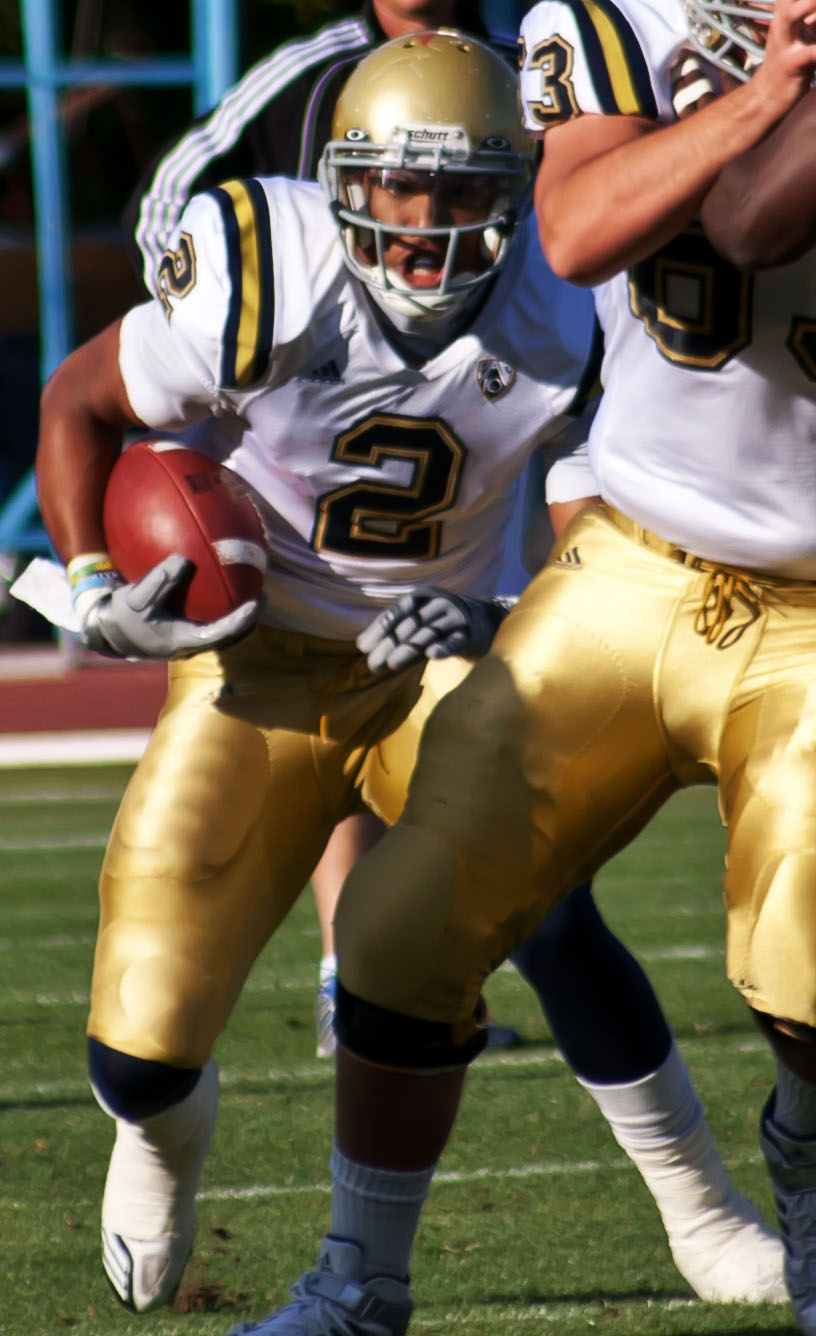
Barr in 2011 at UCLA

Barr was an offensive player his first two years at the University of California, Los Angeles, playing running back, wide receiver and tight end. On October 21, 2010, against the Oregon Ducks, Barr made his first start, and he made one catch for 17 yards. In 2011, he caught an 11-yard touchdown pass against the Houston Cougars. Although he started 12 games on offense in both years, he ran the ball 15 times for 54 yards. Barr struggled at being a running back, which almost caused him to quit football. However, prior to his junior season in 2012, he switched to linebacker.

During Barr's first year as a linebacker, he recorded 13.5 sacks, 21.5 tackles for loss and 83 tackles. His 13.5 sacks were the second-highest total in the nation (behind only Georgia's Jarvis Jones). He was named a first-team All-Pac-12 Conference and was selected to the CBSSports.com College Football All-America second-team. In Week 11, Barr was named Pac-12 Defensive Player of the Week after his performance against the Washington State Cougars. At the team's annual awards banquet, Barr was named the Most Valuable Player on defense (Henry R. "Red" Sanders Award). In a November 2012 game against the USC Trojans, Barr sacked quarterback Matt Barkley, who suffered a season-ending shoulder injury.

In six games, Barr made more than seven tackles, including nine against Stanford, eight in the Pac-12 Football Championship game, and nine in the Holiday Bowl against Baylor. Despite being touted as a potential first-round draft choice in the 2013 NFL draft, Barr decided to return to UCLA for his senior season. On July 8, 2013, Barr was ranked 37th as a possibility for the Maxwell Award and 3rd as a candidate for the Chuck Bednarik Award. On July 15, 2013, Barr was named as a candidate for the Butkus Award and the Lombardi Award. He was also named to the 2013 preseason All-American team.

Barr was named Pac-12 Defensive Player of the Week after week 2 of the 2013 season, a 41–21 win over Nebraska on September 14, 2013. He was also the Walter Camp Football Foundation player of the week on defense. For the 2013 regular season, Barr had 62 tackles, 20 for a loss (ranked 9th) and has forced five fumbles (fifth best) and recovered four (second in the nation). He led the team with ten sacks for 66 yards and was rewarded with the Lott IMPACT Award. Barr is in sixth place on the all-time school list for tackles for loss (41.5) and is tied for sixth on the school's all-time list for sacks (23.5). On December 11, 2013, Barr was named a first-team All-American by the USA Today, becoming the first UCLA player since Kai Forbath to do so.

== Professional career ==
=== Pre-draft ===
Barr was listed as one of the top linebacker prospects for the 2014 NFL draft. After the college season concluded, he was projected as the No. 3 selection in the 2014 NFL draft by Sports Illustrated. At the 2014 NFL Combine, Barr ran the 40-yard dash in 4.66 seconds, sixth-best among linebackers, and tied for 14th in the vertical (34.5 inches). His 15 reps on the bench press were also dead last among those who participated, according to NFL.com's combine tracker. At the UCLA Pro Day on March 11, he ran an electronic 4.41 in the 40-yard dash, did 19 repetitions on the bench press and had a 10-foot-5 (3.20 meters) broad jump.

External videos
- Barr's NFL Combine workout
- Barr gets drafted by Minnesota

Pre-draft measurables
Height	Weight	Arm length	Hand span	40-yard dash	10-yard split	20-yard split	20-yard shuttle	Three-cone drill	Vertical jump	Broad jump	Bench press
6 ft 4 7/8 in (1.95 m)	255 lb (116 kg)	33 1/2 in (0.85 m)	9 3/8 in (0.24 m)	4.41 s	1.57 s	2.67 s	4.19 s	6.82 s	34.5 in (0.88 m)	10 ft 5 in (3.18 m)	19 reps
All values from NFL Combine and UCLA Pro Day

Barr was selected in the first round, ninth overall by the Minnesota Vikings, making him the highest selected defensive player out of UCLA since Eric Turner, second overall in 1991. He is the first UCLA player to be a top-10 selection since Jonathan Ogden, who was selected fourth overall in 1996. He also surpassed Jamir Miller, who was chosen tenth overall in 1994, as the highest Bruins linebacker ever selected.

Nate Cohn of The New York Times in 2022 listed Barr and Ryan Mathews as the only two of 19 top NFL draft picks since 2005 whose careers justified being chosen much earlier than their ESPN draft ranking.

=== Minnesota Vikings (first stint) ===
==== 2014 season ====
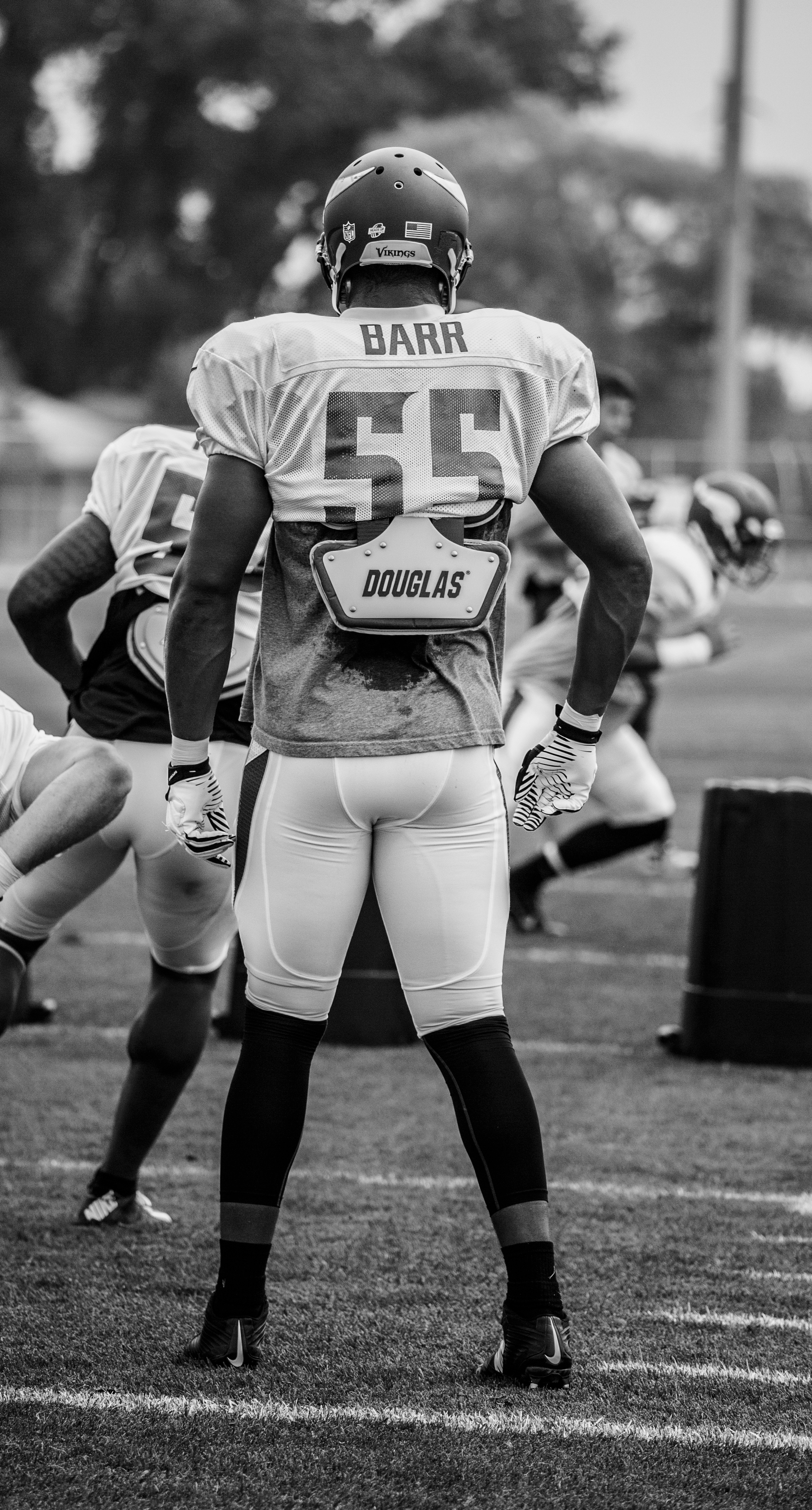
Barr during 2014 training camp

Barr signed a four-year, $12.7 million contract with the Vikings. He received a $7.6 million signing bonus and the team could exercise a fifth-year option. Barr played in and started 12 games for the Vikings and was awarded National Football Conference (NFC) defensive player of the week for week 8. Barr's 2014 season was cut short due to an injury and he was put on injured reserve. He ended his rookie season with 70 combined tackles, four sacks, two forced fumbles, three fumble recoveries (one returned for a touchdown) and three pass deflections. He was a top contender for defensive rookie of the year and one of three Viking defenders named to the Pro Football Focus All-NFC North Team.

==== 2015 season ====
In the first game of the season, Barr played all 73 defensive snaps against the San Francisco 49ers and recorded a career-high 12 tackles. He was credited with nine solo stops. In a Week 4 loss against the eventual Super Bowl 50 champions Denver Broncos, Barr recorded his first career interception off a pass thrown by Peyton Manning. Barr broke his left hand in Week 9 (November 8), but in Week 12 he had a career-high eight tackles (seven solo), one sack, and forced two fumbles. For the season, he totaled 68 tackles, four tackles for loss, 3.5 sacks, eight quarterback hurries, one interception, seven passes defensed, and three forced fumbles. On January 25, 2016, Barr was named to his first Pro Bowl.

==== 2016 season ====
Barr struggled during the 2016 season, as he had only 37 solo tackles and two sacks. Despite a poor season in which coach Zimmer stated that Barr had a "tendency to coast," Barr was named to his second straight Pro Bowl.

==== 2017 season ====
On May 1, 2017, the Vikings exercised the fifth year option on Barr's contract. Barr had 75 tackles, 33 solo tackles, 52 assisted tackles, and one sack. On December 19, 2017, Barr was named to his third straight Pro Bowl.

On October 15, 2017, during the Vikings 23–10 victory against the Green Bay Packers, Barr recorded a hit that knocked Aaron Rodgers out of the game, injuring his collarbone. In an interview with Conan O'Brien, Rodgers claimed that Barr gave him "the finger" and told him to "suck it". Packers head coach Mike McCarthy called Barr's hit "illegal". In numerous tweets, Barr stated that Rodgers started trash-talking him, as well as stating that Rodgers "needs to get over it". Barr stated that he isn't a "dirty player", as well as insisting that he didn't intend to injure Rodgers. On December 22, 2019, the Minneapolis Star Tribune received criticism from Packers fans after the newspaper included a photograph of Barr's hit on Rodgers in a column as one of the best Minnesota sports moments of the decade.

In the Vikings' Divisional Round win over the New Orleans Saints, Barr intercepted a Drew Brees pass that was tipped at the line of scrimmage by teammate Everson Griffen.

==== 2018 season ====
Barr was named to his fourth straight Pro Bowl. He finished the 2018 regular season with 55 tackles, three sacks, and one forced fumble in 13 games. On October 2, 2018, Barr was fined $30,080 for a face mask penalty along with horse collar penalties during a Week 3 matchup against the Buffalo Bills. On October 21, 2018, Barr suffered a hamstring injury against the New York Jets, ending a streak where he started in 44 games. Barr went on to miss three games, but returned on November 25 against the Packers.

==== 2019 season ====
On March 11, 2019, it was reported that Barr would be signing a multi-year deal with the Jets. However, Barr changed his mind and re-signed with the Vikings on March 13, 2019, on a five-year, $67.5 million contract with $33 million guaranteed. In Week 5, Barr recorded his first interception since 2015 when he intercepted Daniel Jones in a win over the New York Giants. On October 26, 2019, Barr received a fine for a hit on Matthew Stafford during a Week 7 matchup against the Detroit Lions. On December 2, 2019, Barr recorded a season-high 11 tackles against the Seattle Seahawks. Throughout the year, Barr has had 79 tackles, 54 solo tackles, 25 assisted tackles, 1.5 sacks, and 1 interception.

In the divisional round of the playoffs against the 49ers, Barr forced a fumble on running back Matt Breida and recovered the football, but the Vikings lost 27–10.

==== 2020 season ====
Barr was placed on the reserve/COVID-19 list by the Vikings on July 30, 2020, and activated from the list four days later. He was placed on injured reserve on September 21, 2020, after suffering a torn pectoral muscle in Week 2. He missed the last 14 games of the season.

==== 2021 season ====
In March, the team reworked his contract and Barr was allowed to become a free agent at the end of the season. In August, he underwent a surgery procedure for an injury he suffered in his right knee during training camp. He missed the first four games of the season, while recovering from the knee injury.

In the ninth game against the Los Angeles Chargers, he was declared inactive. In the eleventh game against the 49ers, he suffered a right hamstring injury. He missed the following game against the Detroit Lions. He finished with 11 starts, 72 tackles, 3 interceptions (career-high), 2.5 sacks, and 3 tackles for loss.

=== Dallas Cowboys ===
On August 3, 2022, Barr signed as a free agent with the Dallas Cowboys. He was acquired to provide depth at the linebacking corps. In the eighth game against the Chicago Bears, he suffered a hamstring strain injury late in the second quarter, which also forced him to miss the following three games against the Packers, Vikings and Giants. He appeared in 14 games with 10 starts, collecting 61 tackles, 2 fumble recoveries and one pass defensed. He wasn't re-signed after the season.

=== Minnesota Vikings (second stint) ===
On November 14, 2023, Barr re-signed with the Vikings to their practice squad. He was signed to the active roster on December 29.

After not playing in 2024, Barr announced his retirement from professional football on August 4, 2025.

== Career statistics ==
=== NFL ===
Legend
	Led the league
**Bold**	Career high

Regular season
Year	Team	Games		Tackles					Interceptions						Fumbles		
Year	Team	GP	GS	Cmb	Solo	Ast	Sck	Sfty	PD	Int	Yds	Avg	Lng	TD	FF	FR	Yds
2014	MIN	12	12	70	**55**	15	**4.0**	—	3	0	0	0.0	0	0	2	**3**	**27**
2015	MIN	14	14	68	54	14	3.5	—	**7**	1	**32**	**32.0**	**32**	0	**3**	0	0
2016	MIN	**16**	**16**	70	37	33	2.0	—	4	0	0	0.0	0	0	1	1	0
2017	MIN	**16**	**16**	75	52	23	1.0	—	6	0	0	0.0	0	0	0	0	0
2018	MIN	13	13	55	39	16	3.0	—	2	0	0	0.0	0	0	1	0	0
2019	MIN	14	14	**79**	54	25	1.5	**1**	4	1	2	2.0	2	0	1	1	19
2020	MIN	2	2	6	6	0	0.0	—	0	0	0	0.0	0	0	0	0	0
2021	MIN	11	11	72	38	**34**	2.5	—	5	**3**	11	3.7	8	0	0	2	0
2022	DAL	14	10	58	35	23	1.0	—	1	0	0	0.0	0	0	0	2	0
2023	MIN	4	0	1	1	0	0.0	—	0	0	0	0.0	0	0	0	1	0
Career		116	108	554	371	183	18.5	1	32	5	45	9.0	32	0	8	10	46

=== College ===
Season	Team	GP	GS	Tackles					Interceptions						Fumbles		
Season	Team	GP	GS	Cmb	Solo	Ast	Sck	TfL	PD	Int	Yds	Avg	Lng	TD	FF	FR	Yds
2010	UCLA	12	4	1	1	0	0.0	0	0	0	0	0.0	0	0	0	0	0
2011	UCLA	12	7	2	1	1	0.0	0	0	0	0	0.0	0	0	0	0	0
2012	UCLA	14	14	83	60	23	13.5	21.5	5	0	0	0.0	0	0	4	0	0
2013	UCLA	13	13	73	43	23	10.5	20.0	1	0	0	0.0	0	0	6	4	0
Career		38	23	152	105	47	23.5	41.5	6	0	0	0.0	0	0	10	4	0

== Personal life ==
Barr's father, Tony Brooks, and uncles, Reggie Brooks and Cedric Figaro, all played in the NFL. All of them also played at Notre Dame. Shortly after his birth in South Bend, Barr and his mother moved to the suburbs of Los Angeles where he was raised by his mother and maternal grandparents.

In 2016, Anthony Barr established "Raise the Barr", a nonprofit initiative to assist single-parent undergraduate students in Minnesota and California complete their post-secondary education by providing comprehensive resources to both parents and children. It raised over $250,000 to single parents and provided them with college and emergency grants. On June 27, 2018, it launched new emergency grant funding at Loyola High School, raising $50,000 in assistance, ticket sales, and auctioning.
