= Shaq Evans =

American gridiron football player (born 1991)

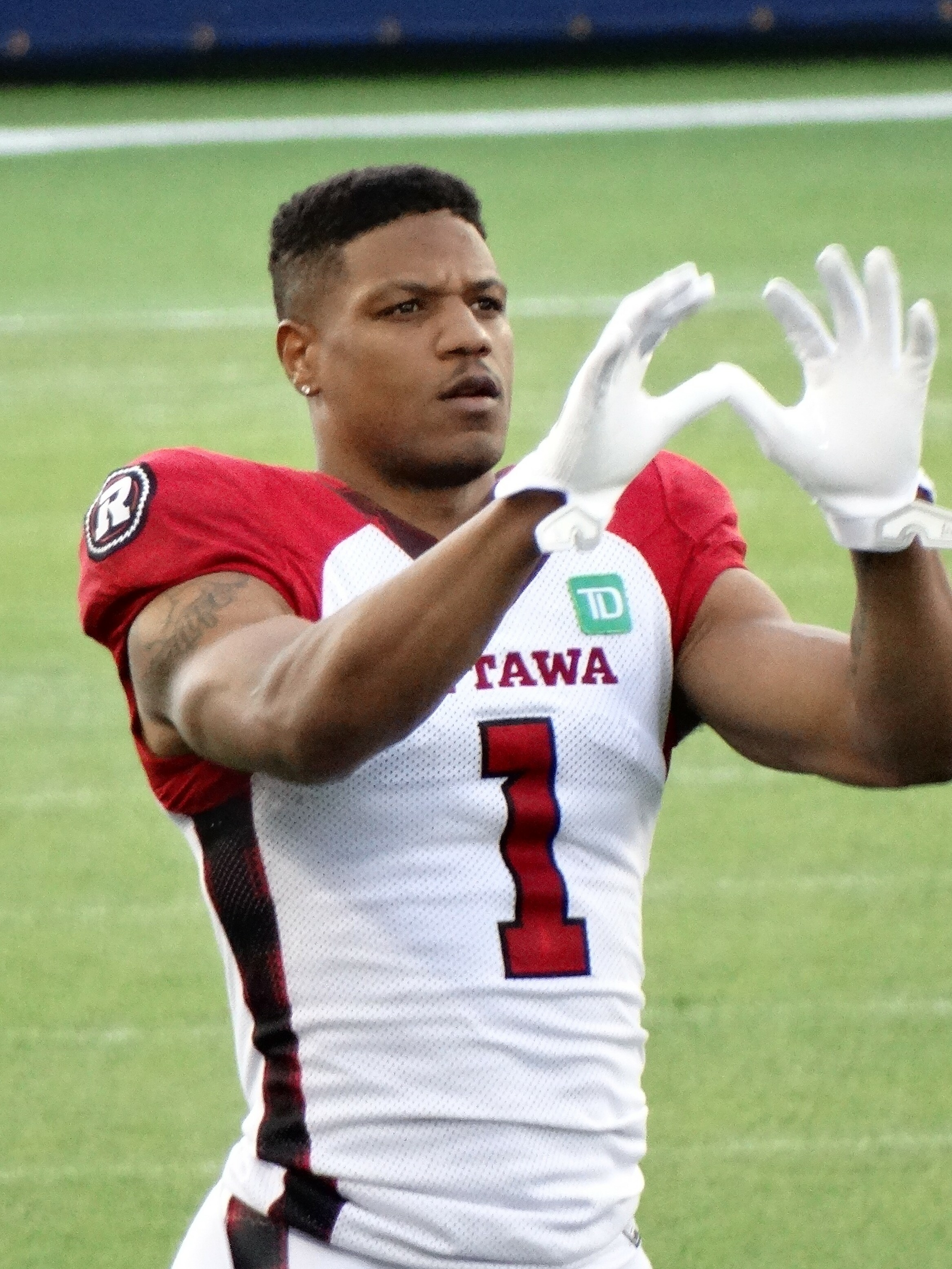
- Evans with the Ottawa Redblacks in 2023

No. 1, 81, 84
- Position: Wide receiver

Personal information
- Born: March 7, 1991 (age 35); Inglewood, California, U.S.
- Listed height: 6 ft 1 in (1.85 m)
- Listed weight: 210 lb (95 kg)

Career information
- High school: Inglewood
- College: Notre Dame (2009); UCLA (2010–2013)
- NFL draft: 2014: 4th round, 115th overall pick

Career history
- New York Jets (2014); Jacksonville Jaguars (2015–2016)*; New England Patriots (2016)*; Dallas Cowboys (2016–2017)*; Saskatchewan Roughriders (2018–2022); Ottawa Redblacks (2023)
- * Offseason or practice squad member only

Awards and highlights
- CFL All-Star (2019); CFL West All-Star (2019)

Career CFL statistics
- Receptions: 179
- Receiving yards: 2,830
- Receiving touchdowns: 7
- Stats at CFL.ca
- Stats at Pro Football Reference

Shaquelle Evans (born March 7, 1991) is an American former football wide receiver. He was selected by the New York Jets in the fourth round of the 2014 NFL draft. He played college football at UCLA. Evans was also a member of the Jacksonville Jaguars, New England Patriots, Dallas Cowboys, Saskatchewan Roughriders and Ottawa Redblacks.

== Early life ==
Evans was selected and participated in the Hawaii Prep Football Classic. He played in the U.S. Army All-American game. He was selected to SuperPrep All-America team in high school. He was named to the Western 100 by the Tacoma News-Tribune in high school. He was selected to the all-state third team by CalHiSports.com following his senior year in high school.

== College career ==
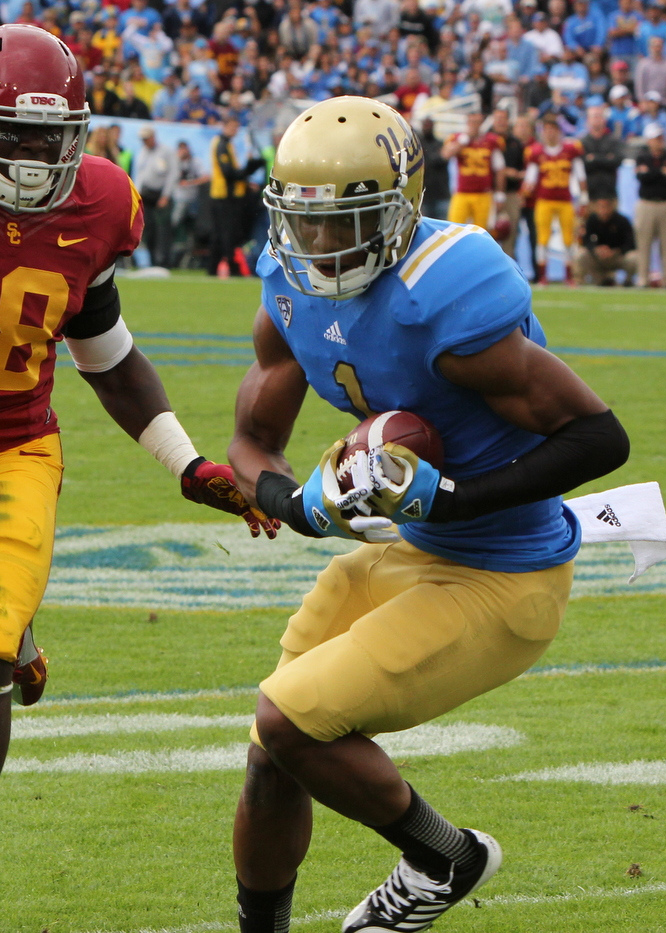
Evans with UCLA in 2012

Evans originally attended Notre Dame, but decided to transfer to UCLA due to the proximity to home. Evans was on the watchlist for the Fred Biletnikoff Award prior to his senior year. He was an all-conference honorable mention that season, helping the Bruins to a 10 win season.

== Professional career ==
=== New York Jets ===
On May 10, 2014, Evans was selected by the New York Jets in the fourth round, 115th overall of the 2014 NFL draft. He signed a 4-year, $2.67 million contract on May 15, 2014. Before he could appear in an NFL game, Evans was placed on injured reserve on August 19, 2014, with a shoulder injury. On September 5, 2015, the Jets waived him.

=== Jacksonville Jaguars ===
Evans was signed to the practice squad of the Jacksonville Jaguars on September 29, 2015. On September 3, 2016, he was released by the Jaguars. He was signed to the Jaguars' practice squad the next day. He was released on September 13.

=== New England Patriots ===
Evans was signed to the New England Patriots' practice squad on October 12, 2016. On October 20, 2016, the Patriots released Evans from their practice squad.

=== Dallas Cowboys ===
On January 4, 2017, Evans was signed to the Dallas Cowboys' practice squad. He signed a reserve/future contract with the Cowboys on January 16, 2017.

On April 21, 2017, Evans was suspended the first four games of the 2017 season for violating the league's drug policy. On April 27, 2017, Evans was waived by the Cowboys.

=== Saskatchewan Roughriders ===
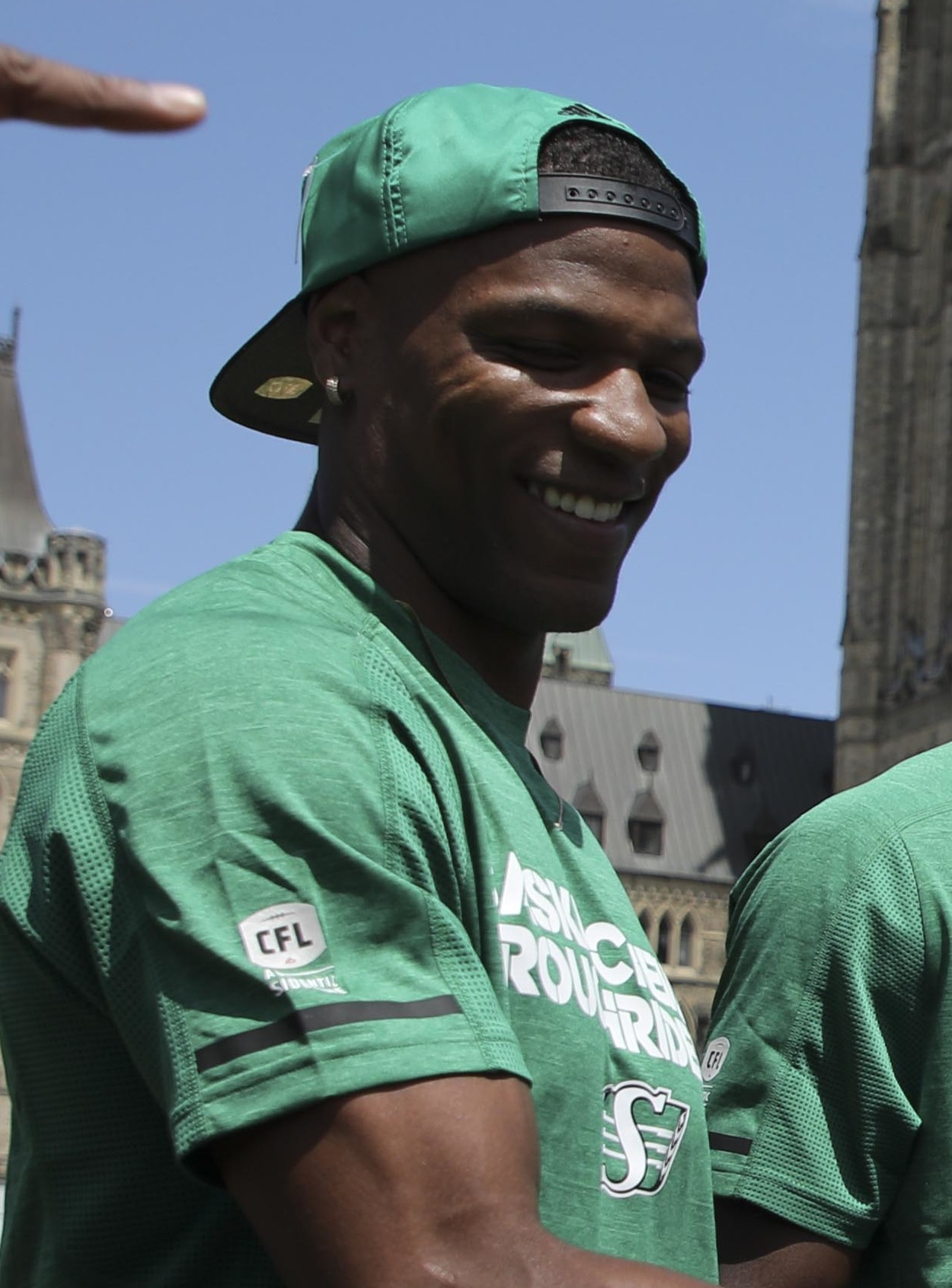
Evans with the Saskatchewan Roughriders in 2018

On February 22, 2018, Evans signed with the Saskatchewan Roughriders of the Canadian Football League (CFL). He played in 17 regular season games in 2018, where he had 50 receptions for 785 yards. In 2019, Evans had 72 receptions and 1,334 receiving yards and scored five touchdowns en route to being named a CFL All-Star. He signed a one-year contract extension with the team on December 24, 2020. In his third season with the club, Evans played in seven games, catching 25 passes for 244 yards. On January 18, 2022, Evans and the Riders agreed to a contract extension. Evans was forced out of the Roughriders third game of the 2022 season with an ankle injury. It was later reported he would miss 6–8 weeks with a fractured ankle. At the time he had caught 10 passes for 185 yards. In total, Evans missed eight games in 2022, playing in 10 regular season games and catching 32 passes for 487 yards with two touchdowns. In late January 2023, as a pending free agent, Evans told a local radio station that he did not expect to re-sign with the Roughriders.

=== Ottawa Redblacks ===
On February 14, 2023, the first day of free agency, Evans signed a one-year contract with the Ottawa Redblacks. Evans broke his finger in the team's first pre-season game and was expected to miss the start of the season. He was targeted nine times in his preseason debut but hauled in just two catches for 39 yards.

He was released on February 13, 2024.
