= Courtnall =

Courtnall is a surname. Notable people with the surname include:

- Courtnall Skosan (born 1991), South African rugby player
- Geoff Courtnall (born 1962), Canadian ice hockey player
- Russ Courtnall (born 1965), Canadian ice hockey player
