= Ally Kendricks =

Canadian-American model and former athlete (born 1993)

- Born: Alexandra Sarah Courtnall; June 26, 1993 (age 33); Los Angeles, California, U.S.
- Other name: Ally Kendricks
- Occupation: Model
- Spouse: Eric Kendricks (m. 2022)
- Parent: Russ Courtnall (father) Paris Vaughan (mother)
- Relatives: Brooklyn Courtnall (sister); Sarah Vaughan (grandmother); Geoff Courtnall (uncle)
- Modeling information
- Height: 5 ft 8 in (173 cm)
- Hair color: Brown
- Eye color: Green
Association football career
- Positions: Right back; right winger
College career
Years	Team	Apps	(Gls)
2011–2014	UCLA Bruins	89	(13)
International career
2010	Canada U-17	6	(0)
Medal record
Women's soccer
CONCACAF Women's U-17 Championship
Gold medal – first place	Costa Rica 2010
Sports career
- Sport: Track and field
- Events: 100 meters, 200 meters, 400 meters, 800 meters, 4 × 100 meters relay, 4 × 400 meters relay
- College team: UCLA Bruins (2012–2015)

Alexandra Sarah Kendricks (née Courtnall; born June 26, 1993) is a Canadian-American model and former two-sport athlete who played soccer and ran track at the University of California, Los Angeles (UCLA). In her junior season, she helped lead the UCLA Bruins soccer team to the 2013 national championship as the tournament's Most Outstanding Defensive Player. She represented her father's country of Canada at the youth international level, winning gold at the 2010 CONCACAF Women's U-17 Championship.

== Early life ==
Kendricks was born in Los Angeles, California, and raised in Vancouver; Victoria, British Columbia; and various cities in the United States where her father, Russ Courtnall, played in the National Hockey League (NHL). She played multiple sports growing up, including soccer, softball, basketball, track, and cross country. Around age ten, she helped her softball team qualify for the Little League Softball World Series. She represented British Columbia to win the Canadian under-15 national soccer championship. She attended high school at Oaks Christian School in Westlake Village, California, where she lettered in soccer and track all four years. In high school, she ran the 100 meters, 200 meters, and 4 × 400 meters relay, setting multiple school records. She played club soccer for Eagles SC in Camarillo, California.

== College career ==
=== Soccer ===
In her freshman season on the UCLA Bruins women's soccer team in 2011, Kendricks scored 6 goals and added 3 assists in 19 games (10 starts) for a point total ranking third on the team only to Sydney Leroux and Sam Mewis. In the 2012 season, she scored 4 goals with 4 assists in 22 games (16 starts), helping UCLA reach the quarterfinals of the NCAA tournament. Kendricks "lost desire to play" soccer after her sophomore season and quit the team, but incoming Bruins head coach Amanda Cromwell successfully recruited her to return with the temptation of competing for the program's first national championship. Her teammates approved, with Sam Mewis saying: "The question was, 'Do you want her on the field in November and December?' And it was a unanimous 'yes'".

Kendricks returned to make 24 appearances (15 starts) for the Bruins in the 2013 season, helping claim the Pac-12 Conference regular-season title. In the NCAA tournament, she contributed to shutout victories against Stanford and North Carolina before scoring the late 1–1 equalizer against Virginia in the semifinals help UCLA advance to the final on penalties. She finished the season shutting out Florida State 1–0 in overtime and was named the tournament's Most Outstanding Defensive Player. In the 2014 season, she started all 24 games and earned second-team all-conference honors as UCLA defended their Pac-12 title and reached the NCAA quarterfinals. During her years at UCLA, she played primarily at right back—forming a strong defensive line with Caprice Dydasco and Abby Dahlkemper—but was sometimes moved up to right winger in more attacking configurations.

=== Track ===
Kendricks also starred for the UCLA Bruins track and field team from 2012 to 2015. During her first three years, she competed in events including the 100 meters, 200 meters, 400 meters, 4 × 100 meters relay, and 4 × 400 meters relay. She was named honorable mention All-American during her freshman season for placing 21st in the 4 × 400 relay at the NCAA tournament in 2012. In her sophomore season in 2013, she anchored the 4 × 100 and 4 × 400 relays to third- and fourth-place finishes at the Pac-12 championships. During her junior season in 2014, she set a personal best of 53.84 in 400 m during the Pac-12 preliminary rounds, ending up in eighth with a time of 54.68 in the finals. Kendricks decided to train for a new event, the 800 meters, in her senior season, and ran a personal best of 2:05.48 to place fifth at the Pac-12 championships in 2015.

== International career ==
A dual citizen through her father, Kendricks trained with both the United States U17 and Canada U17 youth national teams, choosing to represent Canada in competition. She made 3 appearances (2 starts) as Canada won the 2010 CONCACAF Women's U-17 Championship. She played the full 90 minutes in a 0–0 semifinal draw against the United States before Canada advanced on penalties. She appeared in all 3 games (2 starts) at the 2010 FIFA U-17 Women's World Cup.

== Modeling career ==
Kendricks retired from sports after her graduation from UCLA, saying "My body was beat up, but so was my mind". She began modeling and signed with Sports + Lifestyle Unlimited, appearing in advertising campaigns for brands like Lululemon and Banana Republic. She has since been represented by Women 360 Management and CGM-Caroline Gleason Management. In 2021, she made her first appearance in the Sports Illustrated Swimsuit Issue after an open casting search.

== Personal life ==
Kendricks' father, Russ Courtnall, played 16 seasons in the National Hockey League (NHL). Her mother, Paris Vaughan, is a former track star and actress who was the adopted daughter of jazz singer Sarah Vaughan. Kendricks' sister, Brooklyn Courtnall, played college soccer for the USC Trojans, and her brother, Lawton, played college ice hockey at Western Michigan. Her uncle, Geoff Courtnall, also played in the NHL.

She met then-UCLA Bruins football player Eric Kendricks in 2010, and they began dating in 2013. The couple married on July 2, 2022. Their son, Knight, was born on May 3, 2023. Their daughter, Maxx, was born on December 10, 2024.

Kendricks has spoken openly about her battles with anxiety and depression. In 2021, she started the mental health–focused lifestyle and social media brand Dual Citizen.
