= Brooklyn Courtnall =

Canadian-American soccer player (born 2002)

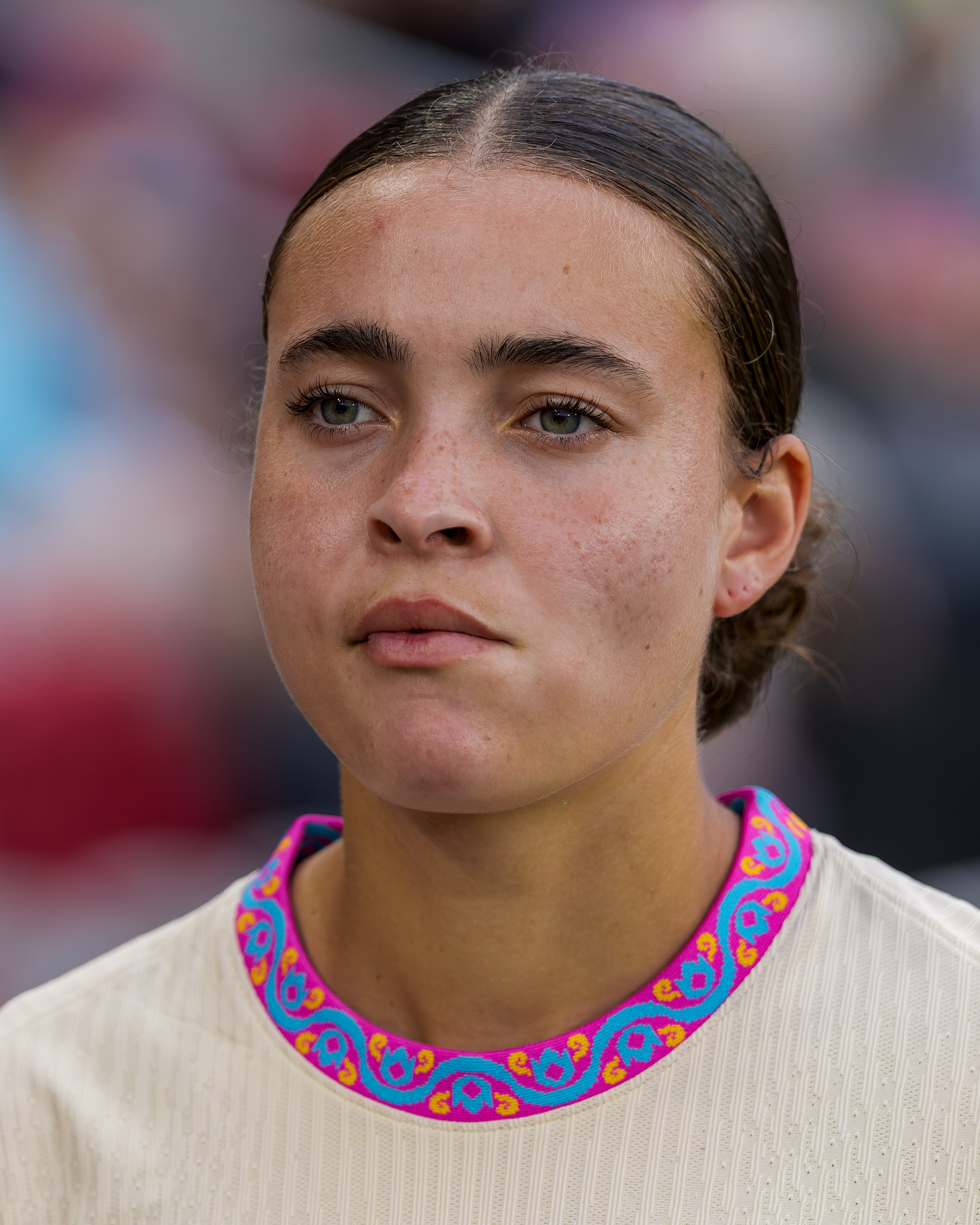
- Courtnall with the San Diego Wave in 2026

Personal information
- Full name: Brooklyn Jean Courtnall
- Date of birth: December 28, 2002 (age 23)
- Place of birth: Los Angeles, California, United States
- Height: 1.73 m (5 ft 8 in)
- Position: Defender

Team information
- Current team: San Diego Wave (on loan from Bay FC)
- Number: 6

Youth career
- Real So Cal

College career
Years	Team	Apps	(Gls)
2021–2024	USC Trojans	78	(1)

Senior career*
Years	Team	Apps	(Gls)
2025	North Carolina Courage	2	(0)
2025	→ Bay FC (loan)	7	(0)
2026–	Bay FC	11	(0)
2026–	→ San Diego Wave (loan)	8	(0)

International career^{‡}
2022	Canada U-20	10	(3)
2026–	Canada	2	(0)
- * Club domestic league appearances and goals as of 16:40, November 15, 2026 (UTC) ‡ National team caps and goals as of July 30, 2026

Brooklyn Jean Courtnall (born December 28, 2002) is a professional soccer player who plays as a defender for San Diego Wave FC of the National Women's Soccer League (NWSL), on loan from Bay FC. Born in the United States, she plays for the Canada national team. She played college soccer for the USC Trojans, earning first-team All-American honors in 2024.

== Early life ==
Born and raised in Los Angeles, Courtnall began playing soccer with an AYSO team at age five and also grew up running track. She attended Oaks Christian School in Westlake Village, which she helped lead to the state track championship in 2019. She played one season of high school soccer and played DA club soccer for Real So Cal. She initially committed to the University of California, Los Angeles, in the footsteps of her older sister, Ally, before switching to the University of Southern California.

== College career ==
Courtnall was a four-year starter for the USC Trojans from 2021 to 2024, making 78 appearances on the back line. She missed time with USC only once, when she represented Canada at the 2022 FIFA U-20 Women's World Cup. She earned All-Pac-12 third-team honors each of her first three seasons. A team captain in her senior season in 2024, she contributed to 11 clean sheets in 23 games and led USC to the Big Ten Conference regular-season title and the quarterfinals of the NCAA tournament. She was named first-team All-Big Ten and first-team All-American after her senior season.

== Club career ==
=== North Carolina Courage ===
The North Carolina Courage announced on December 19, 2024, that the club had signed Courtnall to a three-year contract. She was the Courage's first college signing since the abolition of the NWSL Draft. She made her professional debut on March 29 as a late substitute for forward Hannah Betfort in a 0–0 draw against the Portland Thorns. In July, she scored her first professional goal in a 4–0 friendly win against Guadalajara.

=== Bay FC ===
On August 28, 2025, Courtnall joined fellow NWSL club Bay FC on loan for the remainder of the season. She made her first NWSL start on September 21 in a 1–1 draw against Gotham FC, creating a central defensive partnership with Sydney Collins, her fellow Canadian and former Courage teammate. On December 11, Bay made the loan permanent in exchange for US$100,000 in intraleague transfer funds.

On January 6, 2026, Courtnall re-signed with Bay on a new three-year contract.

On July 31, 2026, Courtnall was sent on loan to fellow NWSL club San Diego Wave until the end of the season. She made her Wave debut on August 14, coming on as a substitute for Perle Morroni in a 1–1 draw with the Denver Summit.

== International career ==
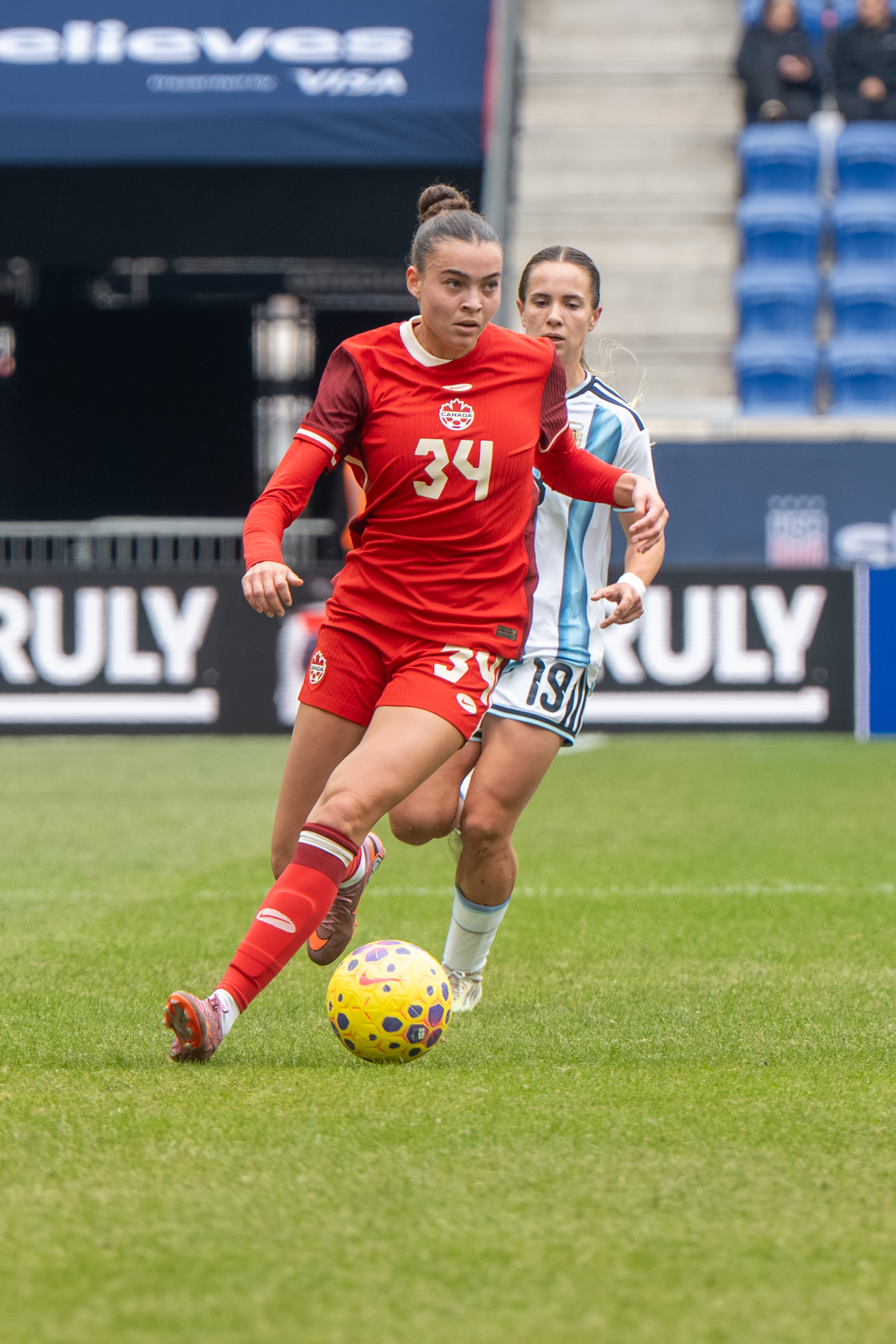
Courtnall with Canada in 2026

Courtnall received her first call-up to Canada's youth national program at age 19 in 2022. She appeared in all 7 games (3 starts) and scored 2 goals at the 2022 CONCACAF Women's U-20 Championship as Canada came away with the bronze medal. She appeared in all 3 games (2 starts) at the 2022 FIFA U-20 Women's World Cup.

Courtnall earned her first call-up to the senior national team in February 2026, being named to the squad for the 2026 SheBelieves Cup. She made her senior debut at the SheBelieves Cup on March 1, playing the last nine minutes as a substitute for Vanessa Gilles in a 4–1 win over Colombia.

== Personal life ==
Courtnall's father, Russ, played 16 seasons in the National Hockey League (NHL). Her mother, Paris Vaughan, is an actress who was the adopted daughter of jazz singer Sarah Vaughan. Courtnall's sister, Ally, is a model and former UCLA two-sport athlete in soccer and track, and her brother, Lawton, played college ice hockey at Western Michigan. Her uncle, Geoff Courtnall, also played in the NHL.

== Honors and awards ==
USC Trojans

- Big Ten Conference: 2024

Individual

- NCAA Division I first-team All-American: 2024
- First-team All-Big Ten: 2024
- Third-team All-Pac-12: 2021, 2022, 2023
- Pac-12 all-freshman team: 2021
