= Herbert Hoover High School (Fresno, California) =

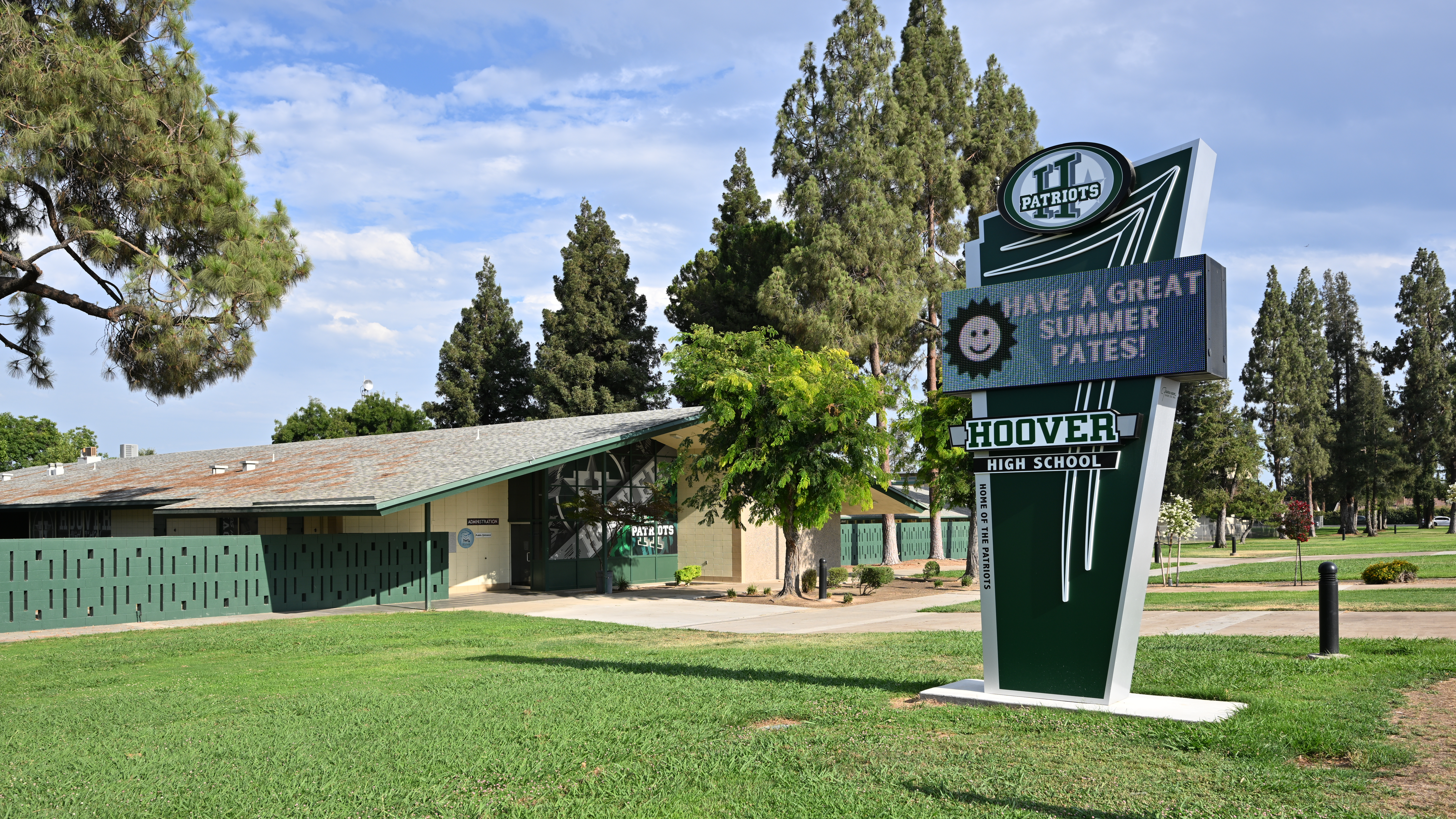

Location
- 5550 N. First Street; Fresno, California 93710; United States; 36.81807°N 119.77225°W

Information
- Type: Public
- Established: 1963
- Principal: Courtney Curtis
- Teaching staff: 98.72 (FTE)
- Enrollment: 2,021 (2023-2024)
- Student to teacher ratio: 20.47
- Campus size: Medium-sized city
- Colors: Green and White
- Mascot: Patriot
- Website: hoover.fresnounified.org

Herbert Hoover High School is a public secondary school in the Fresno Unified School District serving Fresno, California, United States, in northern Fresno County. It is named for Herbert Hoover, the 31st President of the United States.

== Performance ==
The school achieved an API index of 697 in 2008.

== Notable alumni ==
- Dan Boitano (class of 1971), Major League Baseball (MLB) pitcher
- Ron Dunn (class of 1967), MLB player
- Henry Ellard (class of 1979), National Football League (NFL) wide receiver, state champion in the triple jump
- Eric Kendricks (class of 2010), 2014 Dick Butkus Award-winner
- Mychal Kendricks (class of 2008), NFL linebacker for the Philadelphia Eagles, Seattle Seahawks, and San Francisco 49ers
- Barbara Morgan (class of 1969), NASA astronaut, Teacher in Space Project
- Bob O'Brien, MLB pitcher for the Los Angeles Dodgers
- Rod Perry (class of 1971), NFL defensive back for the Los Angeles Rams
- Ryan Wetnight (class of 1989), NFL tight end for Chicago Bears and Green Bay Packers
