= Eric Kendricks =

American football player (born 1992)

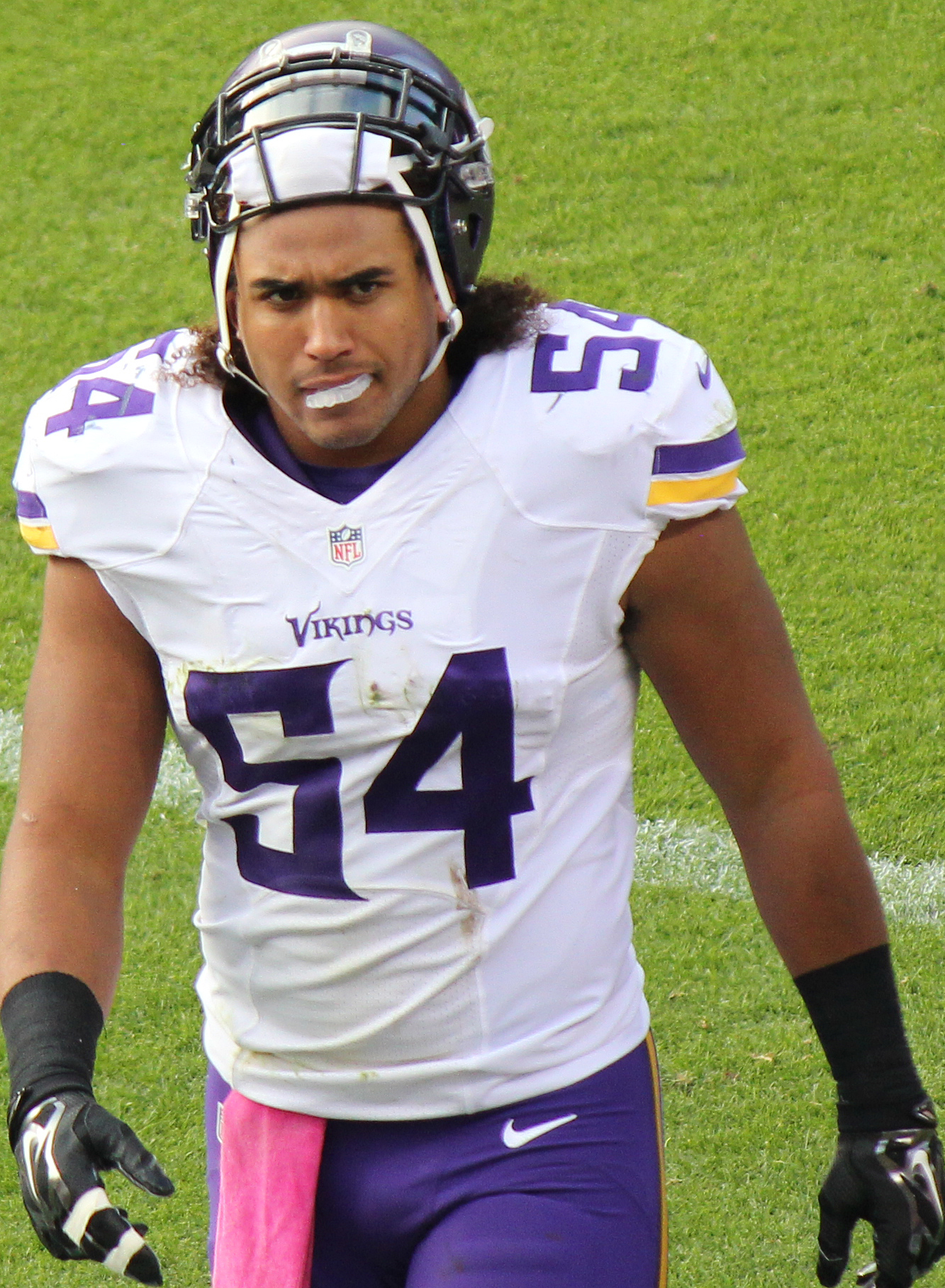
- Kendricks with the Minnesota Vikings in 2015

No. 54 – Los Angeles Rams
- Position: Linebacker
- Roster status: Practice squad

Personal information
- Born: February 29, 1992 (age 34); Clovis, California, U.S.
- Listed height: 6 ft 0 in (1.83 m)
- Listed weight: 232 lb (105 kg)

Career information
- High school: Herbert Hoover (Fresno, California)
- College: UCLA (2010–2014)
- NFL draft: 2015: 2nd round, 45th overall pick

Career history
- Minnesota Vikings (2015–2022); Los Angeles Chargers (2023); Dallas Cowboys (2024); San Francisco 49ers (2025); Los Angeles Rams (2026–present)*
- * Offseason or practice squad member only

Awards and highlights
- First-team All-Pro (2019); Pro Bowl (2019); PFWA All-Rookie Team (2015); Butkus Award (2014); Lott Trophy (2014); First-team All-American (2014); Second-team All-Pac-12 (2014)

Career NFL statistics as of 2025
- Total tackles: 1,180
- Sacks: 21.5
- Forced fumbles: 8
- Fumble recoveries: 7
- Interceptions: 11
- Pass deflections: 60
- Defensive touchdowns: 3
- Stats at Pro Football Reference

Eric-Nathan M. Kendricks (born February 29, 1992) is an American professional football linebacker for the Los Angeles Rams of the National Football League (NFL). He played college football for the UCLA Bruins, winning the Butkus Award as the nation's top collegiate linebacker as a senior in 2014. Kendricks was selected by the Minnesota Vikings in the second round of the 2015 NFL draft and also played for the Los Angeles Chargers, Dallas Cowboys, and San Francisco 49ers.

== Early life ==
Kendricks was born to Yvonne Thagon and Marvin Kendricks, a former running back for UCLA who played professionally in the Canadian Football League (CFL). He grew up with older brother Mychal and younger sister Danielle. They were raised by Thagon, their single mother, who had split from their father, Marvin, who became addicted to crack cocaine. By the time Kendricks started high school, Marvin cleaned himself up. He got married and took a job, and arranged with Thagon to be involved in his kids' lives.

Kendricks attended Herbert Hoover High School in Fresno, California, where he earned three letters for coach Pat Plummer playing linebacker, quarterback, running back, kicker, and punter and serving as team captain his junior and senior seasons. He was teammates with his brother as a sophomore in 2007. As a junior in 2008, he was named first-team All-league defense and was credited with 85 tackles and two sacks, as well as 10 touchdowns on offense. As a senior in 2009, he registered 117 tackles and two interceptions on defense and scored 14 touchdowns on offense. For his senior season efforts, he was named first-team All-league defense by the Fresno Bee. Kendricks also earned multiple letters in basketball (team captain and first-team All-league in '09) for coach Nick French and baseball (first-team All-league in '09 and '10) for coach Sam Flores. He was named 2010 male Tri-Athlete of the Year at his school.

Regarded as a three-star recruit by Rivals.com, Kendricks was ranked No. 60 among outside linebackers and No. 92 among all players in the state of California. Also viewed as a three-star prospect by Scout.com, he was rated No. 42 among middle linebackers nationally and No. 88 in California. He was named to the GoldenStatePreps.com All-State third-team and All-NorCal first-team. Kendricks committed to the University of California, Los Angeles (UCLA) to play college football in November 2009.

== College career ==
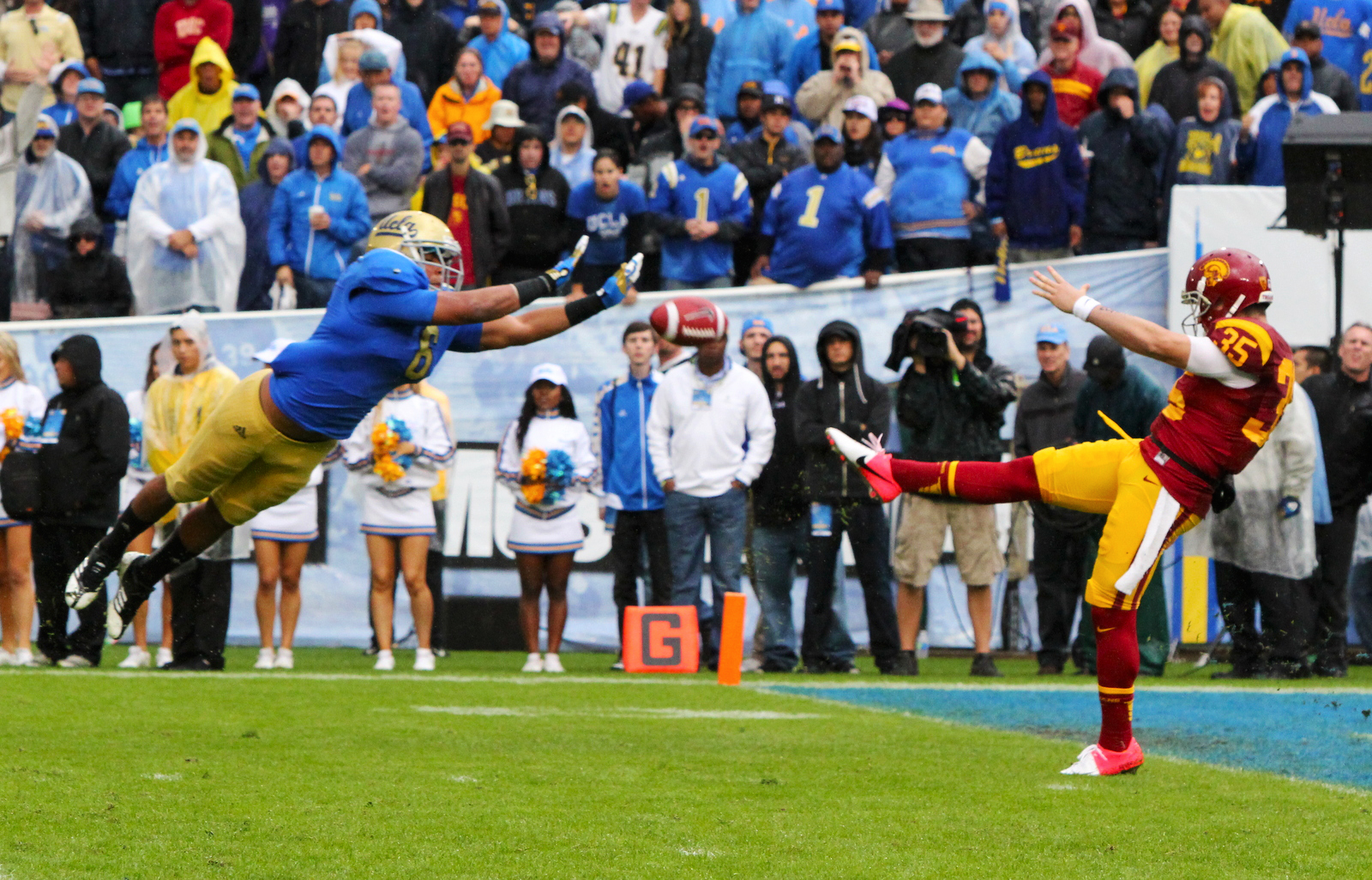
Kendricks blocks a punt in a game against USC in 2012

Kendricks played for the Bruins from 2010 to 2014. After redshirting in 2010, Kendricks played in 14 games with three starts as a redshirt freshman in 2011. He finished the season ranking second on the team in tackles with 76, tied for fourth with 4.5 tackles for loss and tied for second with two sacks. He earned an honorable mention Freshman All-American by College Football News and honorable mention Pac-12 Conference All-Academic team. He also received the John Boncheff Jr. Memorial team award for Rookie of the Year at the annual team banquet.

As a 14-game starter as a sophomore in 2012, Kendricks was named honorable mention All-Pac-12 by the coaches, received the Donn Moomaw Award for Outstanding Defensive Player against USC at the annual team awards banquet and was an honorable mention academic All-conference. He led the Pac-12 in tackles with an average of 10.64, a mark which ranked 11th in the nation, becoming the first Bruin to lead the conference in tackles since Spencer Havner in 2004. Kendricks also returned two fumbles for touchdowns (Houston, at Washington State), blocked a punt (USC) and made his first career interception (USC). His total of 150 tackles was the most by a Bruin player since Jerry Robinson registered a school-record 161 stops in 1978. He recorded nine games with double-digit tackles, including in each of the last seven games of the season.

In Kendricks' 2013 junior campaign, he led the team in tackles for the second straight season with 105 tackles and ranked third in the Pac-12 in tackles average with an 8.8 per game mark. He was an honorable mention All-conference academic team. He was awarded the N.N. Sugarman Award for Best Leadership on defense, the UCLA Captains Award and the Bruin Force Award at the team banquet.

Kendricks entered his senior season in 2014 as a starter for the third straight year. He led the Football Bowl Subdivision with 101 solo tackles, and set the UCLA record for career tackles with 481, breaking the previous mark of 468 set by Jerry Robinson (1976–1978). In the Bruins' 40–35 win over Kansas State in the Alamo Bowl, Kendricks was named the game's defensive most valuable player after recording 10 tackles, including three tackles for loss. For the season, he won the Butkus Award, given annually to the top linebacker in college football and becoming UCLA's first winner. The Sporting News named him a first-team All-American, the Walter Camp Football Foundation placed him on their second team, and he was also named second-team All-Pac-12.

== Professional career ==
=== Pre-draft ===
Kendricks solidified his status as one of the draft's top linebackers with an impressive performance at the 2015 NFL Combine; his 4.61 40-yard dash was one of the fastest times among linebackers. At the conclusion of the pre-draft process, he was ranked as the top inside linebacker prospect by DraftScout.com, the second ranked inside linebacker by NFL analyst Charles Davis, the third best linebacker prospect by Sports Illustrated and was ranked the fourth best linebacker prospect by NFL analyst Mike Mayock.

Pre-draft measurables
Height	Weight	Arm length	Hand span	Wingspan	40-yard dash	10-yard split	20-yard split	20-yard shuttle	Three-cone drill	Vertical jump	Broad jump	Bench press
6 ft 0 1/4 in (1.84 m)	232 lb (105 kg)	31 in (0.79 m)	9 5/8 in (0.24 m)	6 ft 4 in (1.93 m)	4.61 s	1.57 s	2.64 s	4.14 s	7.14 s	38 in (0.97 m)	10 ft 4 in (3.15 m)	22 reps
All values from NFL Combine/Pro Day

=== Minnesota Vikings ===
The Minnesota Vikings selected Kendricks in the second round (45th overall) of the 2015 NFL draft. The Vikings also selected former UCLA linebacker Anthony Barr in the previous draft, reuniting the teammates in the NFL. Kendricks was the sixth linebacker drafted in 2015.

==== 2015 ====
On May 7, 2015, the Vikings signed Kendricks to a four–year, $5.15 million contract that included $2.67 million guaranteed and a signing bonus of $2.00 million.

Throughout training camp, Kendricks competed to be the starting middle linebacker against Audie Cole and Gerald Hodges following the departure of Jasper Brinkley. Head coach Mike Zimmer named Kendricks a backup and listed him as the No. 2 middle linebacker on the depth chart to begin the season, behind Gerald Hodges.

On September 14, 2015, Kendricks made his professional regular season debut in the Vikings' season-opener at the San Francisco 49ers and made one solo tackle during their 20–3 loss. On October 4, 2015, Kendricks earned his first career start during a 23–20 loss at the Denver Broncos. He finished the Week 4 loss with four solo tackles and made his first career sack on Broncos quarterback Peyton Manning for a six–yard loss during the second quarter. On October 7, 2015, the Vikings traded Gerald Hodges to the San Francisco 49ers, and subsequently named Kendricks his replacement as the starting middle linebacker. In Week 6, Kendricks collected a season-high ten combined tackles (nine solo) during a 16–10 victory against the Kansas City Chiefs. His ten combined tackles tied a franchise record by a rookie, along with Harrison Smith (2012) and Malik Boyd in (1994). On October 25, 2015, Kendricks recorded six solo tackles and a season-high two sacks on quarterback Matthew Stafford as the Vikings defeated the Detroit Lions 28–19. On October 29, 2015, Kendricks was named the NFL Defensive Rookie for the month of October, when he posted 20 combined tackles, four sacks and 5 quarterback pressures in just three games. He became the first Vikings defensive player to win Rookie of the Month honors since Kevin Williams did it in 2003, and the eighth to win it overall. The last Vikings player to be selected Rookie of the Month was Cordarrelle Patterson in December 2013. He was inactive for two games (Weeks 9–10) due to a rib injury. He also posted 4.0 sacks, which is tied with Anthony Barr for the 2nd-most sacks by a rookie linebacker in team history, trailing only Dwayne Rudd, who finished his rookie season in 2015 with 5.0 sacks. On January 19, 2016, Kendricks was named to the Pro Football Writers of America's (PFWA) 2015 NFL All-Rookie team. He led the Vikings defense in total tackles as a rookie with 92 combined tackles, marking the first time a rookie has led the club in tackles since Rip Hawkins in 1961. Kendricks completed his rookie campaign with a total of 92 combined tackles (72 solo), four sacks, and one pass deflection in 14 games and 11 starts.

==== 2016 ====
After missing the entire preseason due to a hamstring injury he suffered early in training camp, Kendricks returned for the season opener game to bring back his first career interception 77 yards for a touchdown and post six tackles, including one for a loss, in Minnesota's 25–16 win over the Tennessee Titans at Nissan Stadium. His interception return late in the third quarter gave the Vikings their first lead of the game at 12–10 and was the sixth-longest by a Vikings linebacker ever and the longest interception return in the NFL during a Kickoff Weekend since Harrison Smith's 81 yarder at St. Louis in 2014. For his stellar performance in week 1, Kendricks earned NFC Defensive Player of the Week honors, becoming the eighth different Viking to win the award under head coach Mike Zimmer. In Week 5, Kendricks was stellar in coverage against the Houston Texans, as he gave up just two receptions on seven targets for 19 yards and broke up a pass according to Pro Football Focus (PFF).

==== 2017 ====
In 2017, Kendricks started all 16 games, recording a career-high and team-leading 113 tackles.

==== 2018 ====
On April 16, 2018, Kendricks signed a five-year, $50 million contract extension with the Vikings with $25 million guaranteed. He played in and started 14 games. He finished the season with 108 tackles, two interceptions, one sack and a forced fumble.

==== 2019 ====
In Week 6 against the Philadelphia Eagles, Kendricks forced a fumble on tight end Zach Ertz that was recovered by teammate Anthony Barr in the 38–20 win. In Week 7 against the Lions, Kendricks recorded a team high 12 tackles in the 42–30 win. In Week 16 against the Green Bay Packers on Monday Night Football, Kendricks recovered a fumble forced by Anthony Barr on Aaron Jones and recovered another fumble forced by Harrison Smith on Davante Adams during the 23–10 loss. During Kendricks' second fumble recovery, he suffered a quad injury and was forced to exit the game.

In the Divisional Round of the playoffs against the San Francisco 49ers, Kendricks intercepted a pass thrown by Jimmy Garoppolo and returned it for four yards during the 27–10 loss.

==== 2020–2022 ====
In Week 9 of the 2020 season against the Lions, Kendricks recorded his first interception of the season off a pass thrown by Matthew Stafford during the 34–20 win. On November 13, 2022, Kendricks recovered a botched snap in the endzone for a touchdown to give the Vikings the lead against the Bills.

On March 6, 2023, the Vikings released Kendricks.

=== Los Angeles Chargers ===
On March 14, 2023, Kendricks signed a two-year, $13.25 million contract with the Los Angeles Chargers. He finished second on the team in tackles with 117 through 15 games. He added 3.5 sacks, six passes defended, and one forced fumble.

On March 5, 2024, Kendricks was released by the Chargers.

=== Dallas Cowboys ===
On March 14, 2024, Kendricks signed with the Dallas Cowboys. Kendricks started 15 games for Dallas during the regular season, recording two interceptions, three pass deflections, three forced fumbles, one fumble recovery, three sacks, and 138 combined tackles.

=== San Francisco 49ers ===
On November 26, 2025, Kendricks was signed with the San Francisco 49ers' practice squad. On January 7, 2026, Kendricks was promoted to the active roster.

=== Los Angeles Rams ===
On October 6, 2026, Kendricks was signed to the Los Angeles Rams practice squad.

== Career statistics ==
=== NFL ===
Legend
**Bold**	Career high

==== Regular season ====
Year	Team	Games		Tackles					Interceptions						Fumbles				
Year	Team	GP	GS	Cmb	Solo	Ast	Sck	TFL	Int	Yds	Avg	Lng	TD	PD	FF	Fum	FR	Yds	TD
2015	MIN	14	11	92	72	20	4.0	8	0	0	0.0	0	0	1	0	0	0	0	0
2016	MIN	15	14	109	70	39	2.5	9	1	**77**	**77.0**	**77T**	**1**	9	1	0	1	0	0
2017	MIN	16	16	113	67	46	1.0	**10**	1	33	33.0	33	**1**	6	0	0	0	0	0
2018	MIN	14	14	108	63	45	1.0	3	2	3	1.5	3	0	7	1	0	1	0	0
2019	MIN	15	15	110	70	40	0.5	4	0	0	0.0	0	0	**12**	2	0	**2**	0	0
2020	MIN	11	11	107	69	38	0.0	4	**3**	0	0.0	0	0	6	0	0	0	0	0
2021	MIN	15	15	**143**	81	62	**5.0**	8	2	22	11.0	22	0	4	0	0	1	**2**	0
2022	MIN	**17**	**17**	137	**87**	50	1.0	8	0	0	0.0	0	0	6	0	0	1	0	**1**
2023	LAC	15	14	117	79	38	3.5	7	0	0	0.0	0	0	6	1	0	0	0	0
2024	DAL	15	15	138	71	**67**	3.0	4	2	15	7.5	8	0	3	**3**	0	1	0	0
2025	SF	3	1	6	3	3	0.0	0	0	0	0.0	0	0	0	0	0	0	0	0
Career		150	143	1,180	732	448	21.5	65	11	148	13.5	77T	2	60	8	0	7	2	1

==== Postseason ====
Year	Team	Games		Tackles					Interceptions						Fumbles				
Year	Team	GP	GS	Cmb	Solo	Ast	Sck	TFL	Int	Yds	Avg	Lng	TD	PD	FF	Fum	FR	Yds	TD
2015	MIN	1	1	8	4	4	0.0	0	0	0	0.0	0	0	**2**	0	0	0	0	0
2017	MIN	2	2	16	**13**	3	0.0	0	0	0	0.0	0	0	**2**	0	0	0	0	0
2019	MIN	2	2	13	5	**8**	0.0	0	**1**	**4**	**4.0**	**4**	0	**2**	0	0	0	0	0
2022	MIN	1	1	6	5	1	**1.0**	1	0	0	0.0	0	0	1	0	0	0	0	0
2025	SF	2	2	**19**	11	**8**	0.0	**3**	0	0	0.0	0	0	1	0	0	0	0	0
Career		8	8	62	38	24	1.0	4	1	4	4.0	4	0	8	0	0	0	0	0

=== College ===
Season	Team	Games		Tackles					Interceptions						Fumbles			
Season	Team	GP	GS	Cmb	Solo	Ast	Sck	TfL	PD	Int	Yds	Avg	Lng	TD	FF	FR	Yds	TD
2010	UCLA	Redshirt																
2011	UCLA	14	3	77	52	25	2.0	4.5	3	0	0	0.0	0	0	0	0	0	0
2012	UCLA	14	14	149	91	58	2.0	6.0	5	1	10	10.0	10	0	2	3	63	2
2013	UCLA	11	11	105	64	41	2.0	4.0	2	1	10	10.0	10	0	0	0	0	0
2014	UCLA	13	13	145	101	44	4.0	11.5	2	1	10	10.0	10	0	1	1	0	0
Totals		52	41	476	308	168	10.0	26.0	12	3	30	10.0	10	0	3	4	63	2

== Awards and honors ==
=== NFL ===
- First-team All-Pro (2019)
- Pro Bowl (2019)
- PFWA All-Rookie Team (2015)
- 3× NFL Top 100 — 83rd (2020), 70th (2021), 93rd (2023)

=== College ===
- Second-team All-American (2014)
- Second-team All-Pac-12 (2014)
- Alamo Bowl Defensive MVP (2015)
- Butkus Award (2014)
- Lott Trophy (2014)

== Personal life ==
Kendricks' brother, Mychal, was a linebacker in the NFL. Their father led the Bruins in rushing in 1970 and 1971. Kendricks is the only active NFL player to be born on a leap day. He is of African-American, Asian, and Mexican descent.

Kendricks met model and former athlete Ally Courtnall at UCLA in 2010, and they began dating in 2013. The couple got married on July 2, 2022. Their son, Knight, was born on May 3, 2023.

== See also ==
- List of NCAA major college football yearly tackles leaders
