= 2013 NCAA Division I women's soccer tournament =

2013 NCAA women's soccer tournament
Women's College Cup

Tournament details
- Country: United States
- Dates: November 15–December 8, 2013
- Teams: 64

Final positions
- Champions: UCLA Bruins (1st title, 4th College Cup)
- Runners-up: Florida State Seminoles (2nd title match, 7th College Cup)
- Semifinalists: Virginia Cavaliers (2nd College Cup); Virginia Tech Hokies (1st College Cup)

Tournament statistics
- Matches played: 63
- Goals scored: 172 (2.73 per match)
- Attendance: 65,462 (1,039 per match)
- Top goal scorer(s): Makenzy Doniak, UVA (5)

Awards
- Best player: Offensive–Jamia Fields (FSU); Defensive–Ally Courtnall (UCLA)

The 2013 NCAA Division I women's soccer tournament (also known as the 2013 Women's College Cup) was the 32nd annual single-elimination tournament to determine the national champion of NCAA Division I women's collegiate soccer. The semifinals and championship game were played at WakeMed Soccer Park in Cary, North Carolina from December 6–8, 2013 while the preceding rounds were played at various sites across the country from November 15–30.

UCLA defeated Florida State in the final, 1–0 (in overtime), to win their first national title. The Bruins (22–1–3) were coached by Amanda Cromwell.

The most outstanding offensive player was Jamia Fields from Florida State, and the most outstanding defensive player was Ally Courtnall from UCLA. Fields and Courtnall, alongside nine other players, were named to the All-Tournament team.

The tournament's leading scorer, with 5 goals and 1 assist, was Makenzy Doniak from Virginia.

== Qualification ==
All NCAA Division I women's soccer programs were eligible to qualify for the tournament. The tournament field remained fixed at 64 teams.

== Format ==
Just as before, the final two rounds, deemed the Women's College Cup, were played at a pre-determined neutral site. All other rounds were played on campus sites at the home field of the higher-seeded team although with a few exceptions. The first round was played exclusively on the home fields of higher-seeded teams (noted with an asterisk below). However, the second and third rounds were played on the home fields of the home fields of the two remaining teams in each bracket with the highest seed (generally the #1 and #2 seed in each bracket with a few noted exceptions). Those teams are also noted with asterisk. Finally, the quarterfinal round, or the championship match for each bracket, was played on the home field of the higher-seeded team, with no exceptions.

=== National seeds ===
#1 Seeds	#2 Seeds	#3 Seeds	#4 Seeds
Florida State (18–1–3); North Carolina (17–4–0); Virginia (20–0–1); Virginia Tech (16–4–2)	Florida (17–4–1); Marquette (18–3–0); Nebraska (18–3–1); UCLA (17–1–2)	Michigan (15–3–1); Portland (16–2–1); South Carolina (16–3–2); UCF (16–2–4)	Denver (18–1–1); Penn State (14–6–1); Santa Clara (14–4–1); Texas A&M (17–4–1)

=== Teams ===
Virginia Regional
Seed	School	Conference	Berth Type	Record
	Georgetown	Big East	At-large	15-1-2
	Illinois State	Missouri Valley	Automatic	14-6
	Iowa	Big Ten	At-large	15-6-1
	La Salle	Atlantic 10	Automatic	15-4-3
	Louisville	American	At-large	12-5-1
2	Marquette	Big East	Automatic	18-3
3	Michigan	Big Ten	At-large	15-3-1
	Milwaukee	Horizon	Automatic	10-8-1
	Monmouth	MAAC	Automatic	17-1-2
	Morehead State	Ohio Valley	Automatic	10-10-1
	Notre Dame	ACC	At-large	11-7-1
4	Penn State	Big Ten	At-large	14-6-1
	Saint Francis (PA)	Northeast	Automatic	13-7-1
1	Virginia	ACC	At-large	20-1
	Wake Forest	ACC	At-large	10-6-2
	Western Michigan	MAC	Automatic	09-5-5

Virginia Tech Regional
Seed	School	Conference	Berth Type	Record
	Arkansas	SEC	At-large	13-8
	Boston U.	Patriot	Automatic	14-3-4
	California	Pac-12	At-large	11-4-5
	Colorado College	Conference USA	Automatic	15-4-2
	Duke	ACC	At-large	08-8-4
2	Florida	SEC	At-large	17-4-1
	Harvard	Ivy League	Automatic	12-3-2
	Jacksonville	Atlantic Sun	Automatic	12-7-1
	Oklahoma State	Big 12	At-large	09-6-6
	Rutgers	American	At-large	13-4-4
4	Santa Clara	West Coast	Auto (shared)	14-4-1
	St. John's	Big East	At-large	11-5-3
3	UCF	American	Automatic	16-2-4
	UMBC	America East	Automatic	13-5-2
1	Virginia Tech	ACC	At-large	16-4-2
	West Virginia	Big 12	Automatic	16-3-2

North Carolina Regional
Seed	School	Conference	Berth Type	Record
	Cal State Fullerton	Big West	Automatic	08-6-7
	DePaul	Big East	At-large	13-5-2
	Furman	Southern	Automatic	17-3-2
	Indiana	Big Ten	At-large	14-6-1
	Kentucky	SEC	At-large	13-6-1
	Liberty	Big South	Automatic	16-5-1
	Minnesota	Big Ten	At-large	11-7-2
1	North Carolina	ACC	At-large	17-4
	Ohio State	Big Ten	At-large	10-6-3
	San Diego State	Mountain West	Automatic	13-6-2
3	South Carolina	SEC	At-large	16-3-2
	Stanford	Pac-12	At-large	13-5-1
4	Texas A&M	SEC	Automatic	17-4-1
	Texas Tech	Big 12	At-large	17-2-2
2	UCLA	Pac-12	Automatic	17-1-2
	Utah	Pac-12	At-large	10-4-6

Florida State Regional
Seed	School	Conference	Berth Type	Record
	Boston College	ACC	At-large	10-9-1
	BYU	West Coast	Auto (shared)	14-4-1
	Colorado	Pac-12	At-large	12-6-2
4	Denver	Summit	Automatic	18-1-1
1	Florida State	ACC	Automatic	18-1-3
	Illinois	Big Ten	At-large	10-8-2
	Jackson State	SWAC	Automatic	10-9-2
	Mississippi	SEC	At-large	15-5-2
2	Nebraska	Big Ten	Automatic	18-3-1
	Northeastern	CAA	Automatic	06-8-6
3	Portland	West Coast	Auto (shared)	16-2-1
	Seattle	WAC	Automatic	17-2-2
	South Alabama	Sun Belt	Automatic	13-5-2
	Southeastern Louisiana	Southland	Automatic	14-3-5
	Washington State	Pac-12	At-large	14-3-3
	Weber State	Big Sky	Automatic	10-4-5

== Bracket ==
=== Virginia Bracket ===
First round November 15–16; Campus Sites
1	Virginia*	5
Saint Francis (PA)	0
La Salle	0
Georgetown*	2
Wake Forest*	2
Morehead State	0
Monmouth	0
4	Penn State*	3
3	Michigan*	4
Milwaukee	0
Illinois State (2OT, PK)	1(4)
Louisville*	1(3)
Iowa	1
Notre Dame*	4
Western Michigan	1
2	Marquette*	0

Second round November 22; Regional Campus Sites
1	Virginia*	1
Georgetown	0
Wake Forest	1
4	Penn State	0
3	Michigan*	3
Illinois State	0
Notre Dame	1
Western Michigan	0

Round of 16; November 24; Regional Campus Sites
1	Virginia*	2
Wake Forest	0
3	Michigan*	1
Notre Dame	0

Quarterfinals; November 29–30; Campus Sites
1	Virginia*	2
3	Michigan	1

=== North Carolina Bracket ===
First round November 15–16; Campus Sites
2	UCLA*	3
San Diego State	0
Ohio State	1
Kentucky*	3
Cal State Fullerton	0
Stanford*	1
Furman	0
3	South Carolina*	5
4	Texas A&M*	1
Utah	0
Minnesota	0
Texas Tech*	3
Indiana*	1
DePaul	0
Liberty	0
1	North Carolina*	4

Second round November 22; Regional Campus Sites
2	UCLA*	3
Kentucky	0
Stanford	1^{OT}
3	South Carolina	0
4	Texas A&M (2OT, PK)	2(4)
Texas Tech	2(3)
Indiana	0
1	North Carolina*	4

Round of 16; November 24; Regional Campus Sites
2	UCLA*	2
Stanford	0
4	Texas A&M	0
1	North Carolina*	2

Quarterfinals; November 29–30; Campus Sites
2	UCLA	1
1	North Carolina*	0

=== Virginia Tech Bracket ===
First round November 15–16; Campus Sites
1	Virginia Tech*	2
UMBC	1
Rutgers	0(0)
West Virginia* (2OT, PK)	0(3)
Boston University*	1
Harvard	0
California	1
4	Santa Clara*	2
3	UCF*	1
St. John's (NY)	3
Arkansas	2
Oklahoma State*	1
Colorado College*	1(3)
Duke (2OT, PK)	1(4)
Jacksonville	0
2	Florida*	2

Second round November 22; Regional Campus Sites
1	Virginia Tech*	1
West Virginia	0
Boston University	0
4	Santa Clara	1
St. John's (NY)	0
Arkansas	1
Duke*	1
2	Florida	0

Round of 16; November 24; Regional Campus Sites
1	Virginia Tech* (2OT, PK)	1(3)
4	Santa Clara	1(1)
Arkansas	2(3)
Duke* (2OT, PK)	2(5)

Quarterfinals; November 29–30; Campus Sites
1	Virginia Tech*	3
Duke	0

=== Florida State Bracket ===
First round November 15–16; Campus Sites
2	Nebraska*	4
Southeastern Louisiana	0
Northeastern	0
Boston College*	2
Washington State*	0(1)
Illinois (2OT, PK)	0(3)
Seattle	0
3	Portland*	2
4	Denver*	0
Colorado	1
Weber State	0
BYU*	4
Ole Miss*	9
Jackson State	0
South Alabama	0
1	Florida State*	5

Second round November 22; Regional Campus Sites
2	Nebraska*	1
Boston College	4
Illinois	4
3	Portland	3
Colorado	2
BYU	1
Ole Miss	1
1	Florida State*	3

Round of 16; November 24; Regional Campus Sites
Boston College	4
Illinois	1
Colorado	0
1	Florida State*	4

Quarterfinals; November 29–30; Campus Sites
Boston College	0
Florida State*	4

=== College Cup ===
Semifinals; December 6 WakeMed Soccer Park; Cary, North Carolina
1	Virginia	1(2)
2	UCLA (2OT, PK)	1(4)
1	Virginia Tech	2
1	Florida State	3

Championship; December 8 WakeMed Soccer Park; Cary, North Carolina
2	UCLA (OT)	1
1	Florida State	0

== All-tournament team ==
- Jamia Fields, Florida State (most outstanding offensive player)
- Ally Courtnall, UCLA (most outstanding defensive player)
- Sarah Killion, UCLA
- Megan Oyster, UCLA
- Katelyn Rowland, UCLA
- Ashley Manning, Virginia Tech
- Ashley Meier, Virginia Tech
- Kristin Grubka, Florida State
- Kelsey Wys, Florida State
- Morgan Brian, Virginia
- Makenzy Doniak, Virginia

== See also ==
- NCAA Women's Soccer Championships (Division II, Division III)
- NCAA Men's Soccer Championships (Division I, Division II, Division III)
