= Mychal Kendricks =

American football player (born 1990)

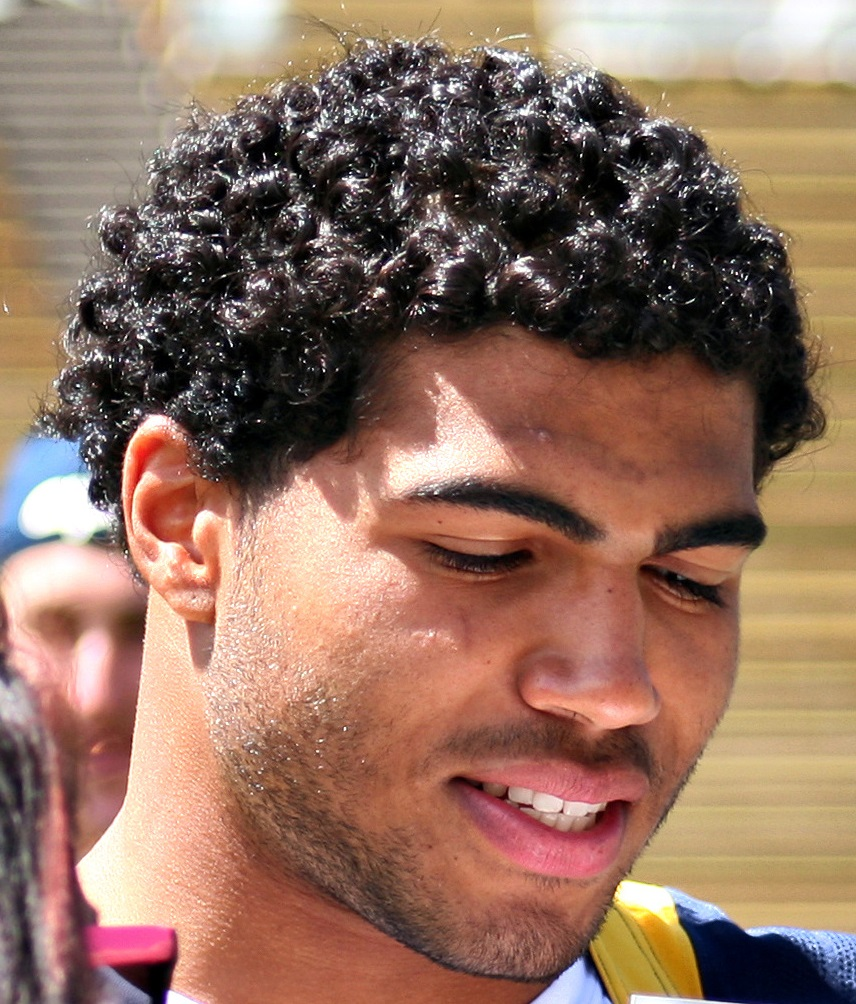
- Kendricks with the California Golden Bears in 2010

No. 95, 56, 48
- Position: Linebacker

Personal information
- Born: September 28, 1990 (age 36); Fresno, California, U.S.
- Listed height: 5 ft 11 in (1.80 m)
- Listed weight: 240 lb (109 kg)

Career information
- High school: Herbert Hoover (Fresno)
- College: California (2008–2011)
- NFL draft: 2012: 2nd round, 46th overall pick

Career history
- Philadelphia Eagles (2012–2017); Cleveland Browns (2018)*; Seattle Seahawks (2018–2020); Washington Football Team (2020); San Francisco 49ers (2021)
- * Offseason or practice squad member only

Awards and highlights
- Super Bowl champion (LII); Pac-12 Defensive Player of the Year (2011); First-team All-Pac-12 (2011); Second-team All-Pac-10 (2010)

Career NFL statistics
- Total tackles: 548
- Sacks: 19.0
- Forced fumbles: 7
- Fumble recoveries: 5
- Interceptions: 4
- Stats at Pro Football Reference

Marvin Mychal-Christopher Kendricks (born September 28, 1990) is an American former professional football player who was a linebacker in the National Football League (NFL). After playing college football for the California Golden Bears, he was selected by the Philadelphia Eagles in the second round of the 2012 NFL draft. Kendricks won Super Bowl LII with the Eagles. In September 2018, he pleaded guilty to insider trading and was released by the Cleveland Browns.

== Early life ==
Kendricks was born to Yvonne Thagon and Marvin Kendricks, a former running back at UCLA who played professionally in the Canadian Football League (CFL). He grew up with younger brother Eric Kendricks and younger sister Danielle. They were raised by Thagon, their single mother, who had split from their father, Marvin, who became addicted to crack cocaine. Marvin Kendricks cleaned himself up and arranged with Thagon to be involved in his children's lives.

== College career ==
Kendricks attended the University of California, Berkeley, from 2008 to 2011. He started 29 of 51 games for the Golden Bears, recording 259 tackles, 13.5 sacks, four interceptions and a touchdown during his career.

As a senior in 2011, Kendricks was the Pac-12 Defensive Player of the Year after recording 106 tackles, three sacks and two interceptions.

== Professional career ==
Pre-draft measurables
Height	Weight	Arm length	Hand span	Wingspan	40-yard dash	10-yard split	20-yard split	20-yard shuttle	Three-cone drill	Vertical jump	Broad jump	Bench press
5 ft 11 1/8 in (1.81 m)	239 lb (108 kg)	31 5/8 in (0.80 m)	9 3/8 in (0.24 m)	6 ft 3 5/8 in (1.92 m)	4.56 s	1.53 s	2.61 s	4.14 s	6.68 s	39.5 in (1.00 m)	10 ft 7 in (3.23 m)	24 reps
All values from NFL Combine/Pro Day

=== Philadelphia Eagles ===
==== 2012 ====
The Philadelphia Eagles selected Kendricks in the second round (46th overall) of the 2012 NFL draft. He was the sixth linebacker selected in a highly talented linebacker class that included four Pro Bowlers out of the first seven linebackers drafted.

On May 8, 2012, the Philadelphia Eagles signed Kendricks to a four-year, $4.44 million contract that included $2.60 million guaranteed and a signing bonus of $1.67 million.

He entered organized team activities as the starting strongside linebacker. Throughout training camp, Kendricks competed against Jamar Chaney for the job as the starting strongside linebacker. Head coach Andy Reid named Kendricks the starting strongside linebacker, along with Akeem Jordan and middle linebacker DeMeco Ryans.

He started the Eagles' season-opener at the Cleveland Browns and recorded five combined tackles during a 17–16 victory. On November 11, 2012, Kendricks recorded a season-high seven combined tackles and made his first career sack on quarterback Tony Romo during the Eagles' 38–23 loss to the Dallas Cowboys. On December 23, 2012, Kendricks recorded seven combined tackles in a 27–20 loss to the Washington Redskins in Week 14. He played all but two defensive snaps and left the fourth quarter after receiving a possible concussion. He remained in concussion protocol and was sidelined for the Eagles' Week 17 loss to the New York Giants. He finished his rookie season in 2012 with 75 combined tackles (58 solo), nine pass deflections, and a sack in 15 games. The Philadelphia Eagles did not qualify for the playoffs after finishing fourth in the NFC East with a 4–12 record. Long time head coach Andy Reid was fired after the season, concluding his 14-year history with the organization.

==== 2013 ====
On January 16, 2013, the Philadelphia Eagles announced the hiring of Oregon head coach Chip Kelly as their new head coach entering the 2013 season. Defensive coordinator Billy Davis installed a base 3-4 defense and Kendricks was ultimately moved to inside linebacker to better suit his abilities. He was named one of the starting inside linebackers to start the regular season with DeMeco Ryans and starting outside linebackers Connor Barwin and Trent Cole.

He started the Eagles' season-opener at the Washington Redskins and made ten combined tackles in a 33–27 victory. It marked Kendricks’ first career game with double digit tackles on defense. In Week 5, Kendricks recorded four combined tackles, a pass break up, and recorded his first career interception off a pass attempt by quarterback Eli Manning during a 36–21 victory at the New York Giants. On October 27, 2013, he made a season-high 12 combined tackles (11 solo) in a 15–7 loss to the New York Giants. On November 10, 2013, Kendricks recorded two solo tackles before exiting the Eagles' 27–13 win at the Green Bay Packers with a knee injury that caused him to miss the following game. On December 22, 2013, Kendricks made five combined tackles and a season-high two sacks on quarterback Jay Cutler as the Eagles routed the Chicago Bears 54–11. It marked Kendricks first game with multiple sacks. The following week, he made a season-high tying 12 combined tackles (eight solo), a pass deflection, and intercepted Dallas Cowboys' quarterback Tony Romo in a 24–22 loss. Kendricks finished the 2013 season with 106 combined tackles, four pass deflections, four sacks, four fumble recoveries, three interceptions, and two forced fumbles in 15 games and 15 starts. He played in 83% of the Eagles' defensive snaps in his second season. The Eagles finished their first season under Chip Kelly first in the NFC East with a 10–6 record and received a playoff berth. On January 4, 2014, Kendricks started his first career playoff game and recorded seven combined tackles during a 26–24 loss to the New Orleans Saints in the NFC Wildcard game.

==== 2014 ====
Kendricks started the Philadelphia Eagles' season-opener against the Jacksonville Jaguars and recorded six solo tackles, a pass deflection, and sacked Chad Henne during a 34–17 victory. The following week, he made seven combined tackles and a pass break up in a 30–27 win at the Indianapolis Colts. He left the game in the third quarter after sustaining a calf injury and missed the next four games (Weeks 3–6). In Week 9, he collected a season-high 12 combined tackles and a sack in a 31–21 victory at the Houston Texans. He finished his third season with 83 combined tackles (62 solo), four sacks, and three pass break ups in 12 games and 11 starts. The Philadelphia Eagles did not qualify for the playoffs after finishing second in the NFC East with a 10–6 record.

==== 2015 ====
On August 24, 2015, the Philadelphia Eagles signed Kendricks to a four-year, $29 million extension with $16.09 million guaranteed and a signing bonus of $8 million.

Throughout training camp, Kendricks competed against DeMeco Ryans, Kiko Alonso, and Jordan Hicks for the role as a starting inside linebacker. Head coach Chip Kelly named Kendricks and Alonso the starting duo with Brandon Graham and Connor Barwin as the starting outside linebackers.

He started the Philadelphia Eagles' season-opener at the Atlanta Falcons and made ten combined tackles during their 26–24 loss. The following week, he made seven solo tackles before leaving the Eagles' 20–10 loss to the Dallas Cowboys after suffering a hamstring injury. He was inactive due to the injury in Week 3 and returned briefly in Week 4 before aggravating the injury and missing the next two games (Weeks 5–6). He finished the 2015 season with 86 combined tackles (64 solo), three pass deflections, and three interceptions in 13 games and 13 starts. Head coach Chip Kelly was fired after a Week 16 loss to the Washington Redskins. The Eagles finished second in the NFC East with a 7–9 record and offensive coordinator Pat Shurmur acted as interim head coach for the Eagles' final game in 2017. He played in 627 defensive snaps in 2016 (52%).

==== 2016 ====
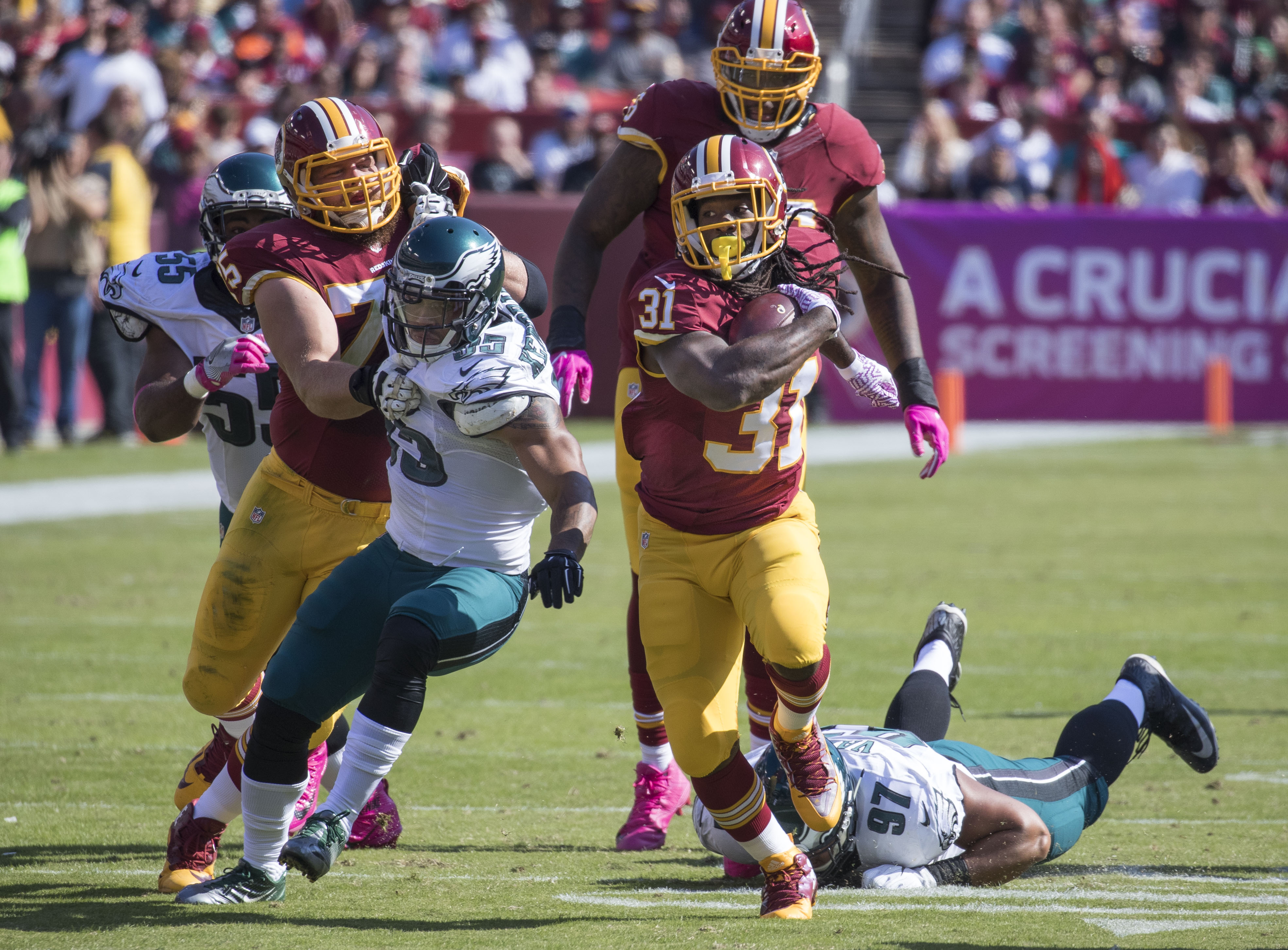
Kendricks (#95) pursuing running back Matt Jones in a game against the Washington Redskins in 2016.

On January 18, 2016, the Philadelphia Eagles announced the hiring of Kansas City Chiefs offensive coordinator Doug Pederson as their new head coach. Former Detroit Lions head coach Jim Schwartz was hired as the new defensive coordinator. Jim Schwartz chose to switch the Eagles' base defense from a 3-4 defense to a 4-3 defense. The change required Kendricks to move from inside linebacker to outside linebacker. Around the time of the 2016 NFL draft, it was reported that the Eagles had placed Kendricks on the trade block and were fielding trade offers for the linebacker. He entered training camp slated as the starting weakside linebacker after Brandon Graham and Connor Barwin were both moved to defensive end. Head coach Doug Pederson named Kendricks the starting weakside linebacker opposite Nigel Bradham and along with starting middle linebacker Jordan Hicks.

In Week 2, Kendricks recorded a season-high four solo tackles during the Eagles' 29–14 win at the Chicago Bears. Kendricks was inactive for the Eagles' Week 17 victory over the Dallas Cowboys after he sustained a quadriceps injury. Kendricks had career-lows in 2016, finishing with only 32 combined tackles (23 solo) and a pass break up in 15 games and eight starts. Kendricks saw significantly less playing time in 2016 due to Schwartz's decision to remove him and only use two linebackers (Jordan Hicks and Najee Goode) during passing downs and nickel formations. He was limited to 273 defensive snaps in 2016 (26.8%) which was significantly lower than his 627 snaps in 2015.

==== 2017 ====
During the off-season, Kendricks requested a trade from the Eagles after a sharp decrease in playing time. General manager Howie Roseman and the Eagles' front office declined his request. On October 12, 2017, Kendricks recorded a career-high 17 combined tackles (12 solo) during a 28–23 win at the Carolina Panthers. Kendricks was inactive for a Week 7 victory over the Washington Redskins after sustaining a hamstring injury. Kendricks received an increase in snaps after Jordan Hicks suffered a torn Achilles tendon during their 34–24 victory against the Redskins. Rookie Joe Walker replaced Hicks in the starting lineup, but Kendricks was tasked as his replacement in nickel formations with Najee Goode. On October 29, 2017, he recorded seven combined tackles and a sack in the Eagles' 33–10 victory at the San Francisco 49ers. Kendricks finished the 2017 regular season with 77 combined tackles (55 solo), six passes defended, and two sacks in 15 games and 13 starts.

The Eagles finished atop the NFC East with a 13–3 record and had a first round bye. The Eagles' went on to defeat the Atlanta Falcons 15–10 in the NFC Divisional round and faced the Minnesota Vikings in the NFC Championship. On January 21, 2018, he made eight combined tackles as the Eagles routed the Vikings (and his brother Eric Kendricks) 38–7. On February 4, 2018, Kendricks started his first career Super Bowl and made four combined tackles as the Eagles defeated the New England Patriots 41–33 in Super Bowl LII.

After yet again requesting a trade, Kendricks was released by the Eagles on May 22, 2018.

=== Cleveland Browns ===
Kendricks signed a one-year contract with the Cleveland Browns on June 5, 2018, but was released on August 29, 2018, after being charged with insider trading.

=== Seattle Seahawks ===
On September 13, 2018, Kendricks signed a one-year deal with the Seattle Seahawks. On September 17, 2018, Kendricks made his first start for the Seahawks just four days after signing with the team. In the game he had three solo tackles and one sack in a 17-24 road loss against the Chicago Bears in Soldier Field. On October 2, 2018, Kendricks was suspended indefinitely from the NFL due to the insider trading. On October 30, 2018, it was revealed that Kendricks was given an eight-game suspension, making him eligible to return in Week 14. He was activated to the Seahawks' roster on December 2, 2018. He suffered a broken tibia in Week 14 and was placed on injured reserve on December 12, 2018.

On March 13, 2019, Kendricks signed a one-year, $4 million contract extension with the Seahawks. In week 4 against the Arizona Cardinals, Kendricks recorded 6 tackles and sacked rookie quarterback Kyler Murray twice in the 27–10 win. In week 8 against the Atlanta Falcons, Kendricks recorded an interception off Matt Schaub in the 27–20 win. This was Kendricks' first interception of the season and his first as a member of the Seahawks. In week 9 against the Tampa Bay Buccaneers, Kendricks recorded a strip sack on Jameis Winston that was recovered by teammate Rasheem Green in the 40–34 overtime win. In Week 17, Kendricks suffered a torn ACL and was ruled out for the playoffs.

On October 21, 2020, the Seahawks signed Kendricks to their practice squad. He was released on November 3, but was re-signed to the practice squad the next day.

=== Washington Football Team ===
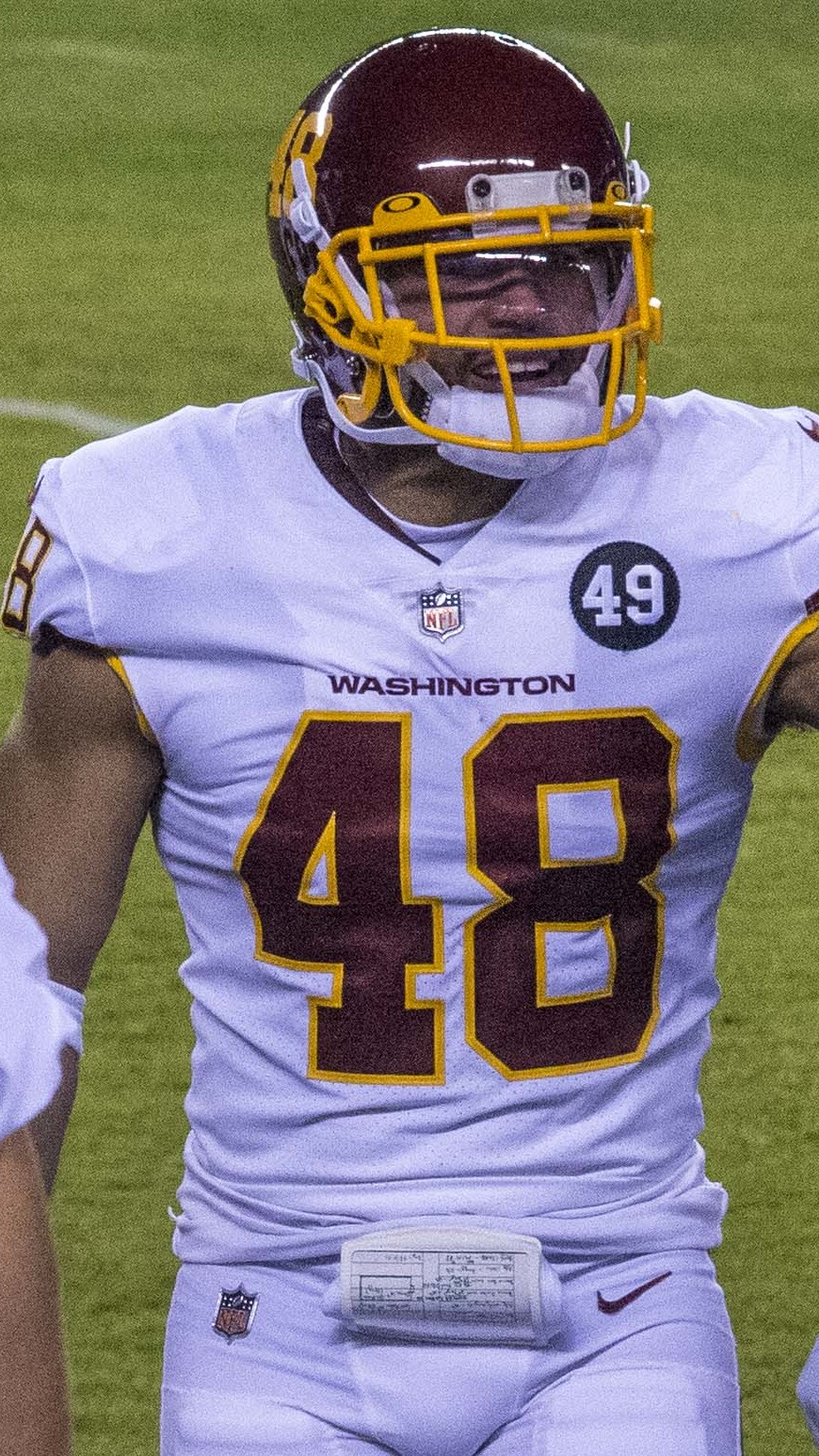
Kendricks with Washington in 2021.

Kendricks was signed by Washington Football Team off the Seahawks' practice squad on December 21, 2020.

=== San Francisco 49ers ===
On August 16, 2021, Kendricks signed a one-year contract with the San Francisco 49ers, but was placed on injured reserve on August 24 and released on September 2. He re-signed with the 49ers on October 18, 2021, but was released on October 23.

== NFL career statistics ==
Legend
**Bold**	Career high

=== Regular season ===
Year	Team	Games		Tackles					Interceptions					Fumbles			
Year	Team	GP	GS	Cmb	Solo	Ast	Sck	TFL	Int	Yds	TD	Lng	PD	FF	FR	Yds	TD
2012	PHI	**15**	14	75	58	17	1.0	6	0	0	0	0	**8**	0	0	0	0
2013	PHI	**15**	**15**	**106**	**81**	**25**	**4.0**	8	**3**	**25**	0	**18**	4	2	**4**	6	0
2014	PHI	12	11	82	61	21	**4.0**	**10**	0	0	0	0	3	**3**	0	0	0
2015	PHI	13	13	86	64	22	3.0	9	0	0	0	0	3	1	0	0	0
2016	PHI	**15**	8	32	23	9	0.0	3	0	0	0	0	1	0	1	**15**	0
2017	PHI	**15**	13	77	55	22	2.0	4	0	0	0	0	6	0	0	0	0
2018	SEA	4	3	19	15	4	2.0	4	0	0	0	0	1	0	0	0	0
2019	SEA	14	14	71	47	24	3.0	8	1	1	0	1	4	1	0	0	0
2020	WAS	1	0	0	0	0	0.0	0	0	0	0	0	0	0	0	0	0
		104	91	548	404	144	19.0	52	4	26	0	18	30	7	5	21	0

=== Playoffs ===
Year	Team	Games		Tackles					Interceptions					Fumbles			
Year	Team	GP	GS	Cmb	Solo	Ast	Sck	TFL	Int	Yds	TD	Lng	PD	FF	FR	Yds	TD
2013	PHI	1	1	7	5	2	0.0	0	0	0	0	0	0	0	0	0	0
2017	PHI	**3**	**3**	**16**	**12**	4	0.0	0	0	0	0	0	**1**	0	0	0	0
2020	WAS	1	1	6	1	**5**	0.0	0	0	0	0	0	0	0	0	0	0
		5	5	29	18	11	0.0	0	0	0	0	0	1	0	0	0	0

== Insider trading charges and plea ==
In August 2018, Kendricks was charged with insider trading, allegedly making $1.2 million from investments in 2014. Damilare Sonoiki was also charged for his involvement. Kendricks allegedly paid Sonoiki $10,000 and gave him free tickets to Eagles games.

Kendricks pleaded guilty to his charges on September 6, 2018, and faced a possible penalty of up to 25 years in prison. He was initially scheduled to be sentenced on January 24, 2019, but his sentencing date was pushed back multiple times during 2019 and 2020. On July 22, 2021, Kendricks was sentenced to one day in jail, three years of probation, and 300 hours of community service stemming from his guilty plea.

== Personal life ==
Kendricks' brother, Eric, played linebacker at UCLA and was selected in the second round of the 2015 NFL draft. He is of African-American, Asian, and Mexican descent.
