= Russ Courtnall =

Canadian ice hockey player (born 1965)

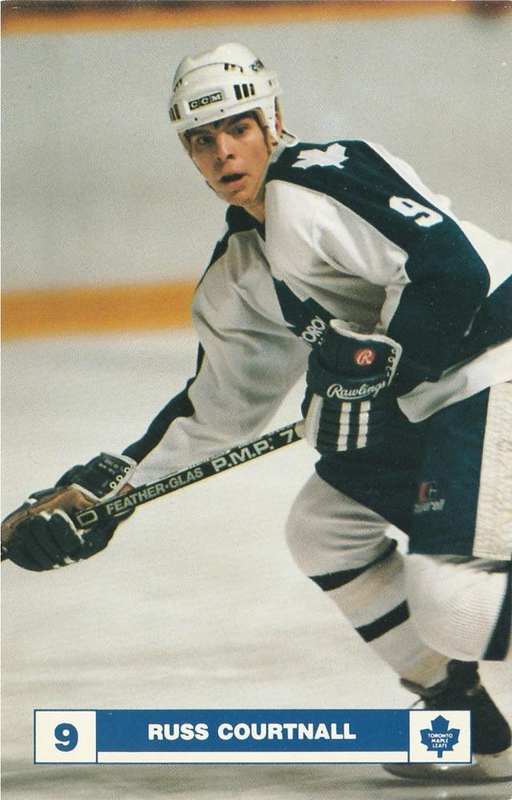
- Courtnall in 1986 postcard
- Born: June 2, 1965 (age 61) Duncan, British Columbia, Canada
- Height: 5 ft 11 in (180 cm)
- Weight: 175 lb (79 kg; 12 st 7 lb)
- Position: Right wing
- Shot: Right
- Played for: Toronto Maple Leafs; Montreal Canadiens; Minnesota North Stars; Dallas Stars; Vancouver Canucks; New York Rangers; Los Angeles Kings
- National team: Canada
- NHL draft: 7th overall, 1983; Toronto Maple Leafs
- Playing career: 1983–1999

Russell William Courtnall (born June 2, 1965) is a Canadian former ice hockey player. He played in the National Hockey League for the Toronto Maple Leafs, Montreal Canadiens, Minnesota North Stars, Dallas Stars, Vancouver Canucks, New York Rangers and Los Angeles Kings between 1984 and 1999. Courtnall was born in Duncan, British Columbia, but grew up in Oak Bay, British Columbia. He is the younger brother of Geoff Courtnall; the two briefly played together as Canucks.

== Professional career ==
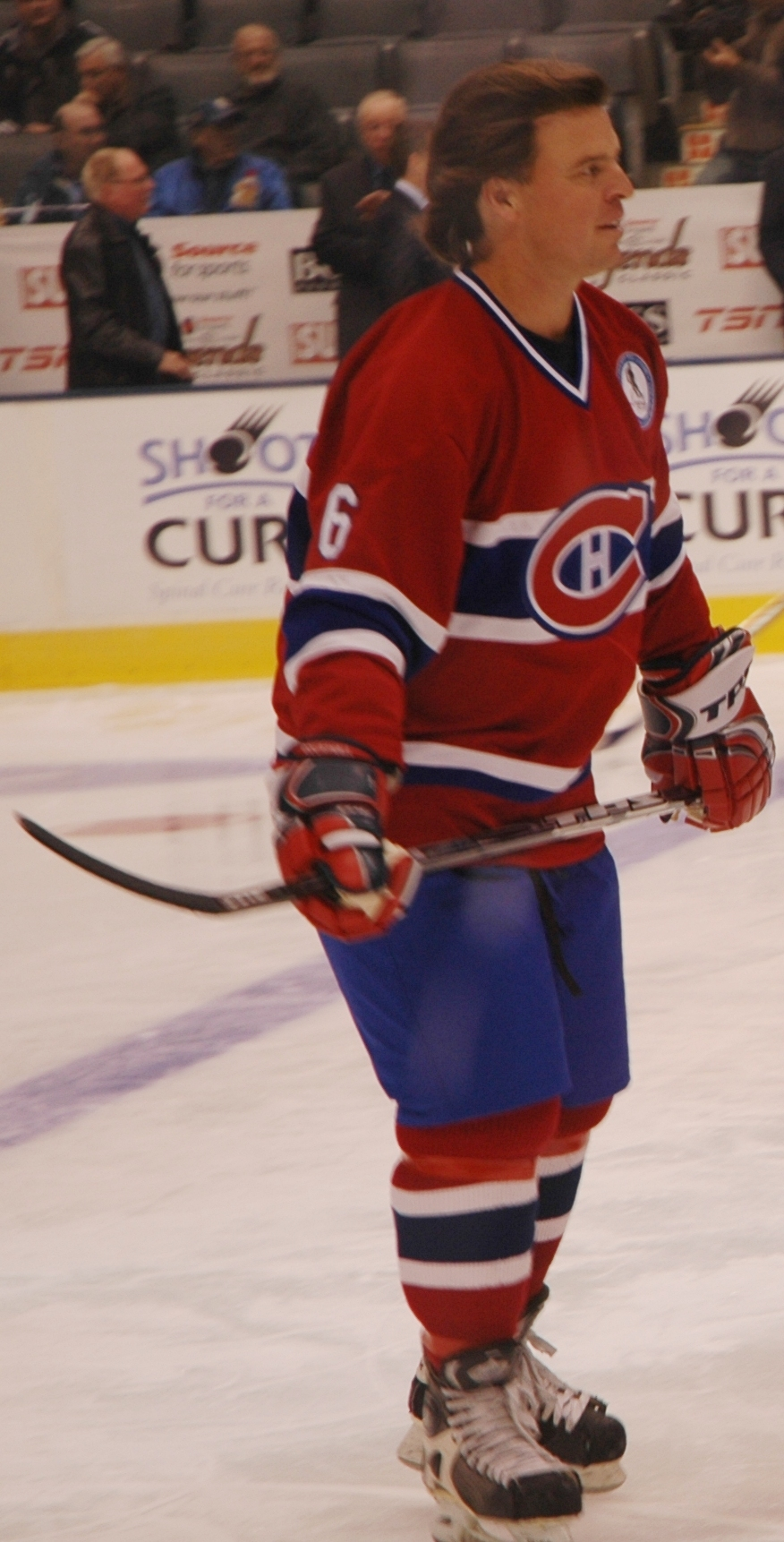
Courtnall for Montreal Canadiens Alumni at the Legends Classic in Toronto

Courtnall was born in Duncan, British Columbia. His father, Archie, had played professional hockey, and worked in the forestry industry on Vancouver Island. Archie had depression and died by suicide in 1978. Coming out of junior hockey, he was considered one of the top prospects in 1983 and the Toronto Maple Leafs selected him seventh overall in the 1983 NHL entry draft. In the 1982–83 season with the Cougars, Courtnall scored 36 goals and 61 assists for 97 points in 60 games. After being drafted by the Leafs, Courtnall appeared in just 32 games with the Cougars, scoring 29 goals and 66 points before being called up to the Maple Leafs, who were in dire need of scoring help at the time. As a rookie with Toronto, he scored 12 goals and 22 points in 69 games. Although his goal production was not as high as the Maple Leafs had hoped for, his speed opened up opportunities, especially for his linemates.

In 1984, Courtnall also suited up for the Canadian Olympic team, which finished out of the medals at the 1984 Winter Olympics. Upon returning, he rejoined the Maple Leafs. In the 1985–86 season, playing alongside fellow Notre Dame Hounds alumni Gary Leeman and rookie Wendel Clark on what was dubbed The Hound Line, Courtnall broke the 20-goal barrier, notching 22 to go along with 38 assists for 60 points. His offensive numbers improved the following year with 29 goals and 73 points.

In trying to force Courtnall to play a tougher brand of hockey, the club saw his offensive production decrease in the 1987–88 season. After just nine games into the 1988–89 season, on November 7, 1988, the Maple Leafs dealt Courtnall to the Montreal Canadiens for enforcer John Kordic. Although Courtnall's stock had clearly gone down in the eyes of Maple Leafs' management, most observers felt Montreal got a steal in that trade.

In 64 games, Courtnall put up 39 points with the Canadiens, but his fast skating and stickhandling abilities made him a fan favourite. Courtnall played strongly in the playoffs, where the Canadiens advanced to the 1989 Stanley Cup Final where they lost to the Calgary Flames. In 21 postseason games, Courtnall contributed eight goals and 13 points.

Courtnall played for the Canadiens until 1991–92 season when on August 31, 1992, he was traded to the Minnesota North Stars for the 1992–93 season. In 84 games, he managed a career-high 36 goals and 43 assists for 79 points. He followed that up with an 80-point season in the team's first year of play in Dallas, and was selected to play in the 1994 National Hockey League All-Star Game. Late in the 1994–95 season, on April 7, 1995, Courtnall was traded to the Vancouver Canucks where he teamed up with his brother, Geoff Courtnall, for 13 games that year.

On March 8, 1997, the Canucks traded Courtnall to the New York Rangers, and on November 7, 1997, Courtnall signed as a free agent with the Los Angeles Kings, where he played until his retirement following the 1998–99 season. He finished with 297 goals, 447 assists and 744 points in a 15-year NHL career.

Courtnall was a participant in both the second and third seasons of Battle of the Blades, the latter as a last-minute replacement for the late Wade Belak, but was eliminated early in the competition on both occasions.

== Career statistics ==
=== Regular season and playoffs ===
			Regular season					Playoffs
Season	Team	League	GP	G	A	Pts	PIM	GP	G	A	Pts	PIM
1981–82	Notre Dame Hounds AAA	SMHL	—	—	—	—	—	—	—	—	—	—
1982–83	Victoria Cougars	WHL	60	36	61	97	33	12	11	7	18	6
1983–84	Victoria Cougars	WHL	32	29	37	66	63	—	—	—	—	—
1983–84	Canadian National Team	Intl	16	4	7	11	10	—	—	—	—	—
1983–84	Toronto Maple Leafs	NHL	14	3	9	12	6	—	—	—	—	—
1984–85	Toronto Maple Leafs	NHL	69	12	10	22	44	—	—	—	—	—
1985–86	Toronto Maple Leafs	NHL	73	22	38	60	52	10	3	6	9	8
1986–87	Toronto Maple Leafs	NHL	79	29	44	73	90	13	3	4	7	11
1987–88	Toronto Maple Leafs	NHL	65	23	26	49	47	6	2	1	3	0
1988–89	Toronto Maple Leafs	NHL	9	1	1	2	4	—	—	—	—	—
1988–89	Montreal Canadiens	NHL	64	22	17	39	15	21	8	5	13	18
1989–90	Montreal Canadiens	NHL	80	27	32	59	27	11	5	1	6	10
1990–91	Montreal Canadiens	NHL	79	26	50	76	29	13	8	3	11	7
1991–92	Montreal Canadiens	NHL	27	7	14	21	6	10	1	1	2	4
1992–93	Minnesota North Stars	NHL	84	36	43	79	49	—	—	—	—	—
1993–94	Dallas Stars	NHL	84	23	57	80	59	9	1	8	9	0
1994–95	Dallas Stars	NHL	32	7	10	17	13	—	—	—	—	—
1994–95	Vancouver Canucks	NHL	13	4	14	18	4	11	4	8	12	21
1995–96	Vancouver Canucks	NHL	81	26	39	65	40	6	1	3	4	2
1996–97	Vancouver Canucks	NHL	47	9	19	28	24	—	—	—	—	—
1996–97	New York Rangers	NHL	14	2	5	7	2	15	3	4	7	0
1997–98	Los Angeles Kings	NHL	58	12	6	18	27	4	0	0	0	2
1998–99	Los Angeles Kings	NHL	57	6	13	19	19	—	—	—	—	—
NHL totals			1,029	297	447	744	557	129	39	44	83	83

=== International ===
Year	Team	Event	GP	G	A	Pts	PIM
1984	Canada	WJC	7	7	6	13	0
1984	Canada	OG	7	1	3	4	2
1991	Canada	WC	2	1	3	4	0
1991	Canada	CC	8	0	2	2	0
Senior totals			17	2	8	10	2

== Personal life ==
Courtnall is married to Paris Vaughan, an actress who was the adopted daughter of jazz singer Sarah Vaughan. They have three children: oldest daughter Ally, a model who played soccer and ran track for the UCLA Bruins; son Lawton, who played college ice hockey at Western Michigan; and youngest daughter Brooklyn, who played college soccer for the USC Trojans.

== See also ==
- List of family relations in the NHL
- List of NHL players with 1,000 games played

Preceded by Gary Nylund	Toronto Maple Leafs first-round draft pick 1983	Succeeded by Al Iafrate
