= Geoff Courtnall =

Canadian ice hockey player, coach (born 1962)

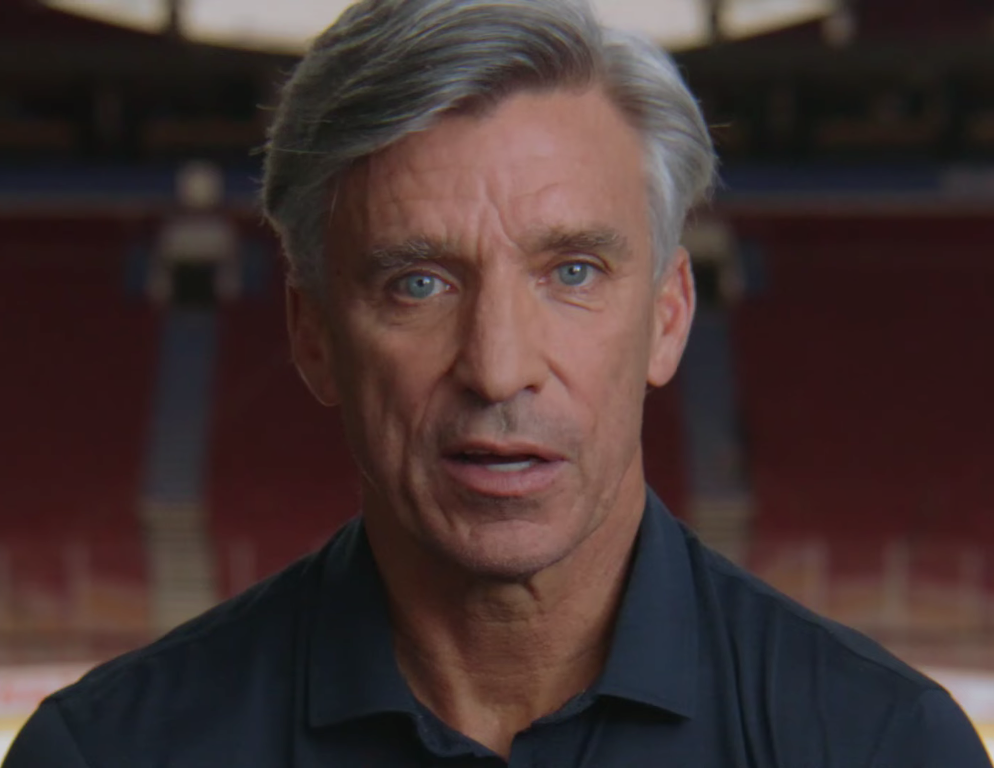
- Courtnall c. 2022
- Born: August 18, 1962 (age 63) Victoria, British Columbia, Canada
- Height: 6 ft 0 in (183 cm)
- Weight: 195 lb (88 kg; 13 st 13 lb)
- Position: Left wing
- Shot: Left
- Played for: Boston Bruins; Edmonton Oilers; Washington Capitals; St. Louis Blues; Vancouver Canucks
- National team: Canada
- NHL draft: Undrafted
- Playing career: 1983–2000

Medal record

Representing Canada

World Championships
Silver medal – second place	1991 Finland	

Geoffrey Lawton Courtnall (born August 18, 1962) is a Canadian former professional ice hockey player who played in the National Hockey League (NHL) from 1983 to 2000. He was the head coach of the Victoria Grizzlies of the British Columbia Hockey League (BCHL) and for the Victoria Vikes of the British Columbia Intercollegiate Hockey League (BCIHL).

== Playing career ==
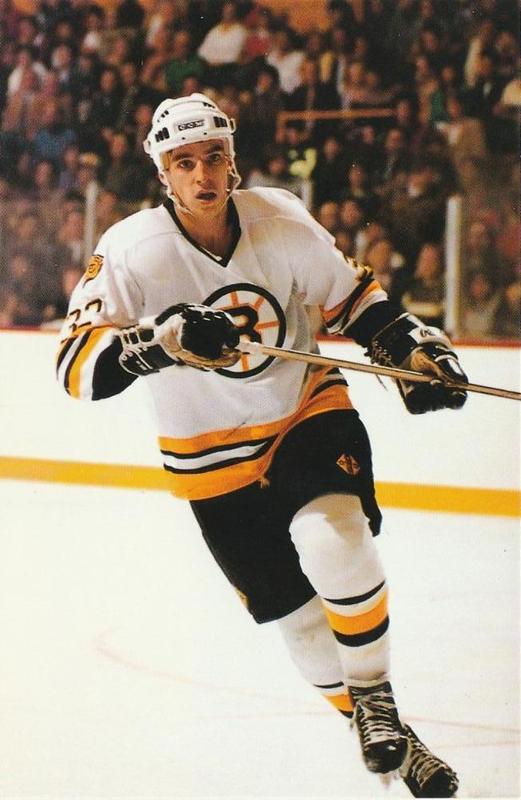
1984 postcard of Geoff Courtnall for Boston Bruins

Geoff Courtnall was signed by the Boston Bruins of the NHL as an undrafted free agent on July 6, 1983. He played for the Bruins from the 1983–84 season to March 8, 1988, when he was traded, along with Bill Ranford, to the Edmonton Oilers for Andy Moog. While in Edmonton, he helped the Oilers win the Stanley Cup in 1988, after facing his old team the Bruins in the finals. About four months later, the Oilers traded Courtnall to the Washington Capitals for Greg Adams. After two seasons in Washington, Courtnall requested a trade, which was granted in the 1990 off-season when he was sent to the St. Louis Blues for Mike Lalor and Peter Zezel.

After less than a season in St. Louis and at the trade deadline, Courtnall, along with Robert Dirk, Sergio Momesso, Cliff Ronning, and future considerations, was traded to the Vancouver Canucks in exchange for Garth Butcher and Dan Quinn. This trade marked a major turning point for the Canucks as these players were among the core that would lead the Canucks on their run to the 1994 Stanley Cup Final. Courtnall then played one more season in Vancouver after the Cup run of 1994 and went back to St. Louis for the start of the 1995–96 season. Courtnall, in his second tenure with the Blues, scored almost 80 goals over five seasons, but only played 30 games over his final two seasons as the result of several concussions, but reached the 1,000 game mark during the 1997–98 season, in which he scored 31 goals in his last full season. After sitting out the last half of the 1998–99 season with a concussion he returned to the lineup the next season. A few games into the 1999–2000 season, he suffered another concussion, which forced his retirement as a result of post-concussion syndrome.

== Personal life ==
Courtnall was born in Victoria, British Columbia, Canada and raised in Duncan, British Columbia. His father, Archie, had played professional hockey, and worked in the forestry industry on Vancouver Island. Archie had depression, and in 1978 killed himself. He is the brother of another former NHL player, Russ Courtnall. Geoff's son, Justin, was drafted 210th overall in the 2007 NHL entry draft by the Tampa Bay Lightning.

After retiring Courtnall moved back to Victoria, though later moved to Vancouver. He estimated that during his playing career he had at least 20 concussions, and it had an effect on his post-playing career. He began to drink heavily, reaching a point where his former teammate Cam Neely discussed Courtnall's drinking while at the 2010 Winter Olympics in Vancouver. This led Courtnall to quit drinking; to take his mind off that, Courtnall would run. He also invested in a gold mining venture in Peru, as well as commercial real estate and construction. Along with his brother, Russ, Courtnall established the Archie Courtnall Centre for emergency psychiatric care at the Royal Jubilee Hospital in Victoria.

== Sexual assault allegation ==
In May 1990, while playing for the Capitals, Courtnall was accused of raping a 17-year-old girl outside a bar, alongside teammates Dino Ciccarelli, Scott Stevens, and Neil Sheehy. The court case fell apart, though a spokesperson for the Metropolitan police at the time – with no supporting evidence available for use at trial – stated that the police "have sufficient grounds to believe that a criminal offense did occur."

== Career statistics ==
=== Regular season and playoffs ===
			Regular season					Playoffs
Season	Team	League	GP	G	A	Pts	PIM	GP	G	A	Pts	PIM
1980–81	Cowichan Valley Capitals	BCJHL	44	20	56	76	56	—	—	—	—	—
1980–81	Victoria Cougars	WHL	11	3	5	8	6	15	2	1	3	7
1981–82	Victoria Cougars	WHL	72	35	57	92	100	4	1	0	1	2
1982–83	Victoria Cougars	WHL	71	41	73	114	186	12	6	7	13	42
1983–84	Boston Bruins	NHL	5	0	0	0	0	—	—	—	—	—
1983–84	Hershey Bears	AHL	74	14	12	26	51	—	—	—	—	—
1984–85	Hershey Bears	AHL	9	8	4	12	4	—	—	—	—	—
1984–85	Boston Bruins	NHL	64	12	16	28	82	5	0	2	2	7
1985–86	Boston Bruins	NHL	64	21	16	37	61	3	0	0	0	2
1985–86	Moncton Golden Flames	AHL	12	8	8	16	6	—	—	—	—	—
1986–87	Boston Bruins	NHL	65	13	23	36	117	1	0	0	0	0
1987–88	Boston Bruins	NHL	62	32	26	58	108	—	—	—	—	—
1987–88	Edmonton Oilers	NHL	12	4	4	8	15	19	0	3	3	23
1988–89	Washington Capitals	NHL	79	42	38	80	112	6	2	5	7	12
1989–90	Washington Capitals	NHL	80	35	39	74	104	15	4	9	13	32
1990–91	St. Louis Blues	NHL	66	27	30	57	56	—	—	—	—	—
1990–91	Vancouver Canucks	NHL	11	6	2	8	8	6	3	5	8	4
1991–92	Vancouver Canucks	NHL	70	23	34	57	116	12	6	8	14	20
1992–93	Vancouver Canucks	NHL	84	31	46	77	167	12	4	10	14	12
1993–94	Vancouver Canucks	NHL	82	26	44	70	123	24	9	10	19	51
1994–95	Vancouver Canucks	NHL	45	16	18	34	81	11	4	2	6	34
1995–96	St. Louis Blues	NHL	69	24	16	40	101	13	0	3	3	14
1996–97	St. Louis Blues	NHL	82	17	40	57	86	6	3	1	4	23
1997–98	St. Louis Blues	NHL	79	31	31	62	94	10	2	8	10	18
1998–99	St. Louis Blues	NHL	24	5	7	12	28	13	2	4	6	10
1999–00	St. Louis Blues	NHL	6	2	2	4	6	—	—	—	—	—
NHL totals			1,048	367	432	799	1,465	156	39	70	109	262

=== International ===
Year	Team	Event	GP	G	A	Pts	PIM
1991	Canada	WC	10	5	1	6	16
Senior totals			10	5	1	6	16

== Awards and achievements ==
- Stanley Cup champion – 1988

== See also ==
- List of family relations in the NHL
- List of NHL players with 1,000 games played
