= 2007 USC Trojans football team =

American college football season

2007 USC Trojans football

Pac-10 co-champion Rose Bowl champion

Rose Bowl, W 49–17 vs. Illinois
- Conference: Pac-10 Conference

Ranking
- Coaches: No. 2
- AP: No. 3
- Record: 11–2 (7–2 Pac-10)
- Head coach: Pete Carroll (7th season)
- Offensive coordinator: Steve Sarkisian (1st season)
- Offensive scheme: Multiple
- Defensive coordinator: Nick Holt (2nd season)
- Base defense: 4–3
- Captains: Sam Baker; John David Booty; Lawrence Jackson; Keith Rivers
- Home stadium: Los Angeles Coliseum

2007 Pacific-10 Conference football standings
	Conf.			Overall
Team	W		L	W		L
No. 3 USC +	7	–	2	11	–	2
No. 16 Arizona State +	7	–	2	10	–	3
No. 25 Oregon State	6	–	3	9	–	4
No. 23 Oregon	5	–	4	9	–	4
UCLA	5	–	4	6	–	7
Arizona	4	–	5	5	–	7
California	3	–	6	7	–	6
Washington State	3	–	6	5	–	7
Stanford	3	–	6	4	–	8
Washington	2	–	7	4	–	9
+ – Conference co-champions; Rankings from AP Poll

The 2007 USC Trojans football team (variously "Trojans" or "USC") represented the University of Southern California during the 2007 NCAA Division I FBS football season, winning a share of the Pacific-10 Conference (Pac-10) championship and winning the 2008 Rose Bowl. The team was coached by Pete Carroll and played its home games at the Los Angeles Coliseum.

The team entered the season with high expectations. It was ranked No. 1 in all national pre-season polls, picked unanimously to win the Pac-10 Conference and expected to contend for a national championship. Those hopes were dealt a major blow when the Trojans lost to 41-point underdog Stanford in a mid-season game that was named one of the greatest upsets in a season that became defined by them. After their second loss, there were questions as to whether the team would be able to even win their own conference, let alone compete nationally. However, USC defied mid-season expectations and rallied, finishing the season ranked No. 2 in the Coaches' Poll and No. 3 in the Associated Press (AP) Poll. By the end of the season various sports journalists said the Trojans were playing the best football of anyone in the country.

The Trojans were named national champion by Dunkel, became the first team to win (or share) six straight Pacific-10 titles, and were the first team in major college football to achieve six straight 11-win seasons. After the season, ten USC players were selected in the 2008 NFL draft, with a school-record seven players selected in the first two rounds. Over the next four years, 25 more players from the 2007 USC Trojans football team were drafted into the NFL.

== Before the season ==
=== Pre-season outlook ===
The Trojans ended the 2006 season with a victory in the 2007 Rose Bowl Game and a No. 4 ranking in both AP and Coaches polls, their fifth straight year winning the Pac-10 Championship and finishing in the top 4. During that 5-year period, the team won two national championships (2003, 2004). Prior to the 2007 season, the Trojans were ranked No. 1 in all national pre-season polls and were expected to challenge for the national championship. The team received a boost in the offseason when many draft-eligible juniors decided to return to school for their senior seasons; the holdover of talented veterans was a major factor in the Trojans being considered preeminent favorites for a national championship. As expected, USC was at the top of the first Coaches Poll of the season, released on August 3, 2007, with 45 of a possible 60 first-place votes; other teams receiving first-place votes were No. 2 Louisiana State University (LSU) with 4 votes, No. 3 Florida with 6 votes, and No. 5 Michigan with 2 votes. USC was also at the top of the first AP Poll, released on August 18, with 62 of 65 first-place votes, with No. 2 LSU receiving 2 votes and No. 3 West Virginia receiving one. In mid-August, all twelve experts polled by ESPN picked USC to win the season's BCS Championship Game. On August 29, 2007, the day before the season began, three of four experts at SI.com predicted USC would win the BCS Championship Game, attributing the decision to the Trojans defense.

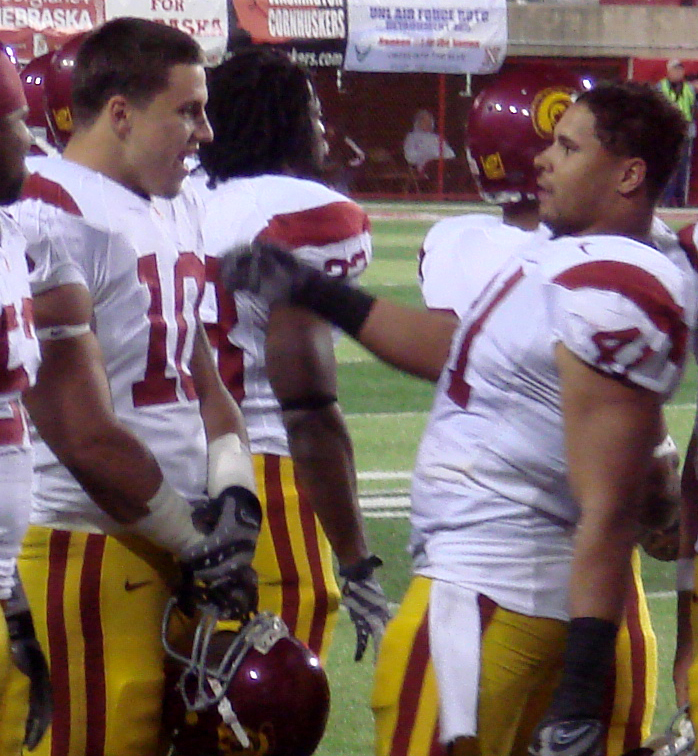
Brian Cushing (#10) and Thomas Williams (#41) returned to a highly ranked linebacking corps.

In terms of overall talent, Carroll stated that the 2007 squad is the "most competitive team we've had" during his six-year tenure as coach. Senior starting quarterback John David Booty entered the season as a front-runner for the Heisman Trophy. Booty, along with returning senior tackle Sam Baker, were ranked as two of the "Top 20 Players Heading Into 2007" by Sports Illustrated.

The Trojans entered pre-season fall camp well stocked at the running back position, with 10 former high school Super Prep All-Americans, nine of whom were Prep Star all-Americans and seven were Parade all-Americans. The exceptional running back situation at USC was a major factor in Sports Illustrated forecasting the 2007 season as "The Year of the Running Back." In judging USC as a pre-season favorite, particular emphasis was made on the defense. Considered to be one of the best defenses during the 2006 season, the Trojans entered 2007 with 10 returning starters and key backups. After a one-season experiment with the 3–4 defense formation, the defense returned to using the 4–3. The highlight of the defense was the linebacking corp, led by Brian Cushing, Keith Rivers and Rey Maualuga.

At the Pacific-10 Conference media day, the Trojans were the unanimous pre-season pick to win the conference; this was USC's fifth year in a row as the favorite to win the conference title, and only the third time in conference history that a team had been picked unanimously (the other two were USC in 2004 and 2005).

=== Recruiting class ===
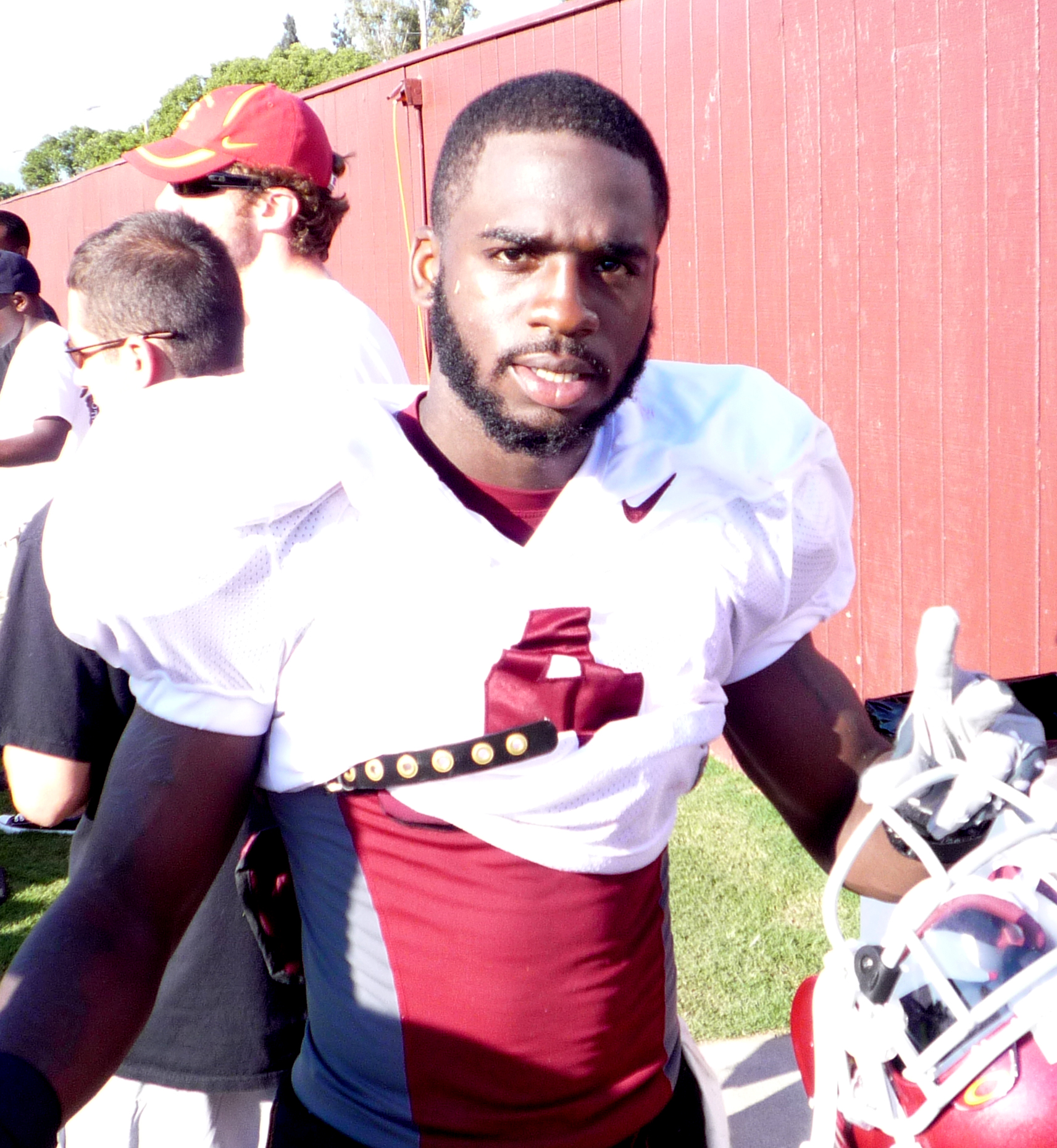
Running back Joe McKnight was part of a highly ranked recruiting class.

USC's stellar recruiting class was highlighted by the three highest ranked players from the "ESPN 150": No. 1 Joe McKnight (RB); No. 2 Chris Galippo (LB); and No. 3 Marc Tyler (RB). The Trojans also landed Scout.com's National Player of the Year and top overall prospect for 2007, Everson Griffen. Other notable signees included Rivals.com's No. 1 WR Ronald Johnson and 5-star OL Kristofer O'Dowd. Despite recruiting substantially fewer players than other programs, USC signed the No. 1 or No. 2 recruiting class in various rankings, along with the Florida Gators, the winners of the 2006 National Championship. In the pre-season, McKnight and Johnson were named two of the top-10 impact freshman for 2007.

The football program received 18 letters of intent on National Signing Day, February 7, 2007, listed below:

College recruiting
Name	Hometown	School	Height	Weight	40^{‡}	Commit date
Joe McKnight; RB	River Ridge, Louisiana	John Curtis Christian HS	6 ft 0 in (1.83 m)	195 lb (88 kg)	4.35	Feb 7, 2007
Joe McKnight; RB	Recruit ratings: Scout: Rivals: (92)					
Everson Griffen; DE	Avondale, Arizona	Agua Fria Union HS	6 ft 4 in (1.93 m)	270 lb (120 kg)	4.46	Dec 20, 2006
Everson Griffen; DE	Recruit ratings: Scout: Rivals: (83)					
Ronald Johnson; WR	Muskegon, Michigan	Muskegon HS	6 ft 0 in (1.83 m)	185 lb (84 kg)	4.40	Feb 4, 2007
Ronald Johnson; WR	Recruit ratings: Scout: Rivals: (82)					
Chris Galippo; LB	Anaheim, California	Servite HS	6 ft 3 in (1.91 m)	240 lb (110 kg)	4.60	Feb 1, 2006
Chris Galippo; LB	Recruit ratings: Scout: Rivals: (90)					
Marc Tyler; RB	Westlake Village, California	Oaks Christian HS	6 ft 0 in (1.83 m)	215 lb (98 kg)	4.50	Jun 14, 2006
Marc Tyler; RB	Recruit ratings: Scout: Rivals: (90)					
Kristofer O'Dowd; C	Tucson, Arizona	Salpointe Catholic HS	6 ft 5 in (1.96 m)	315 lb (143 kg)	5.00	Dec 14, 2006
Kristofer O'Dowd; C	Recruit ratings: Scout: Rivals: (79)					
Aaron Corp; QB	Villa Park, California	Orange Lutheran HS	6 ft 4 in (1.93 m)	195 lb (88 kg)	4.60	May 3, 2006
Aaron Corp; QB	Recruit ratings: Scout: Rivals: (82)					
Marshall Jones; FS	Westlake Village, California	Oaks Christian HS	6 ft 1 in (1.85 m)	190 lb (86 kg)	4.50	Jun 19, 2006
Marshall Jones; FS	Recruit ratings: Scout: Rivals: (84)					
Da'John Harris; DT	Gardena, California	Junipero Serra HS	6 ft 4 in (1.93 m)	280 lb (130 kg)	4.85	Jan 4, 2007
Da'John Harris; DT	Recruit ratings: Scout: Rivals: (79)					
Martin Coleman; OT	Huntington Beach, California	Edison HS	6 ft 6 in (1.98 m)	290 lb (130 kg)	4.80	Apr 25, 2006
Martin Coleman; OT	Recruit ratings: Scout: Rivals: (81)					
Michael Reardon; DE	Villa Park, California	Orange Lutheran HS	6 ft 6 in (1.98 m)	260 lb (120 kg)	4.70	Jun 14, 2006
Michael Reardon; DE	Recruit ratings: Scout: Rivals: (78)					
Malcolm Smith; ATH	Woodland Hills, California	Taft HS	6 ft 2 in (1.88 m)	215 lb (98 kg)	4.45	Jan 26, 2007
Malcolm Smith; ATH	Recruit ratings: Scout: Rivals: (78)					
Broderick Green; RB	Little Rock, Arkansas	Pulaski Academy	6 ft 2 in (1.88 m)	230 lb (100 kg)	4.57	Feb 7, 2007
Broderick Green; RB	Recruit ratings: Scout: Rivals: (76)					
Brandon Carswell; WR	Milpitas, California	Milpitas HS	6 ft 1 in (1.85 m)	180 lb (82 kg)	4.50	Dec 16, 2006
Brandon Carswell; WR	Recruit ratings: Scout: Rivals: (76)					
Jordan Campbell; LB	Norco, California	Norco HS	5 ft 11 in (1.80 m)	230 lb (100 kg)	4.60	Oct 17, 2006
Jordan Campbell; LB	Recruit ratings: Scout: Rivals: (73)					
Christian Tupou; DT	Sacramento, California	Grant Union HS	6 ft 3 in (1.91 m)	275 lb (125 kg)	4.80	Feb 5, 2007
Christian Tupou; DT	Recruit ratings: Scout: Rivals: (73)					
Rhett Ellison; TE	Mountain View, California	Saint Francis HS	6 ft 5 in (1.96 m)	235 lb (107 kg)	4.65	Feb 6, 2007
Rhett Ellison; TE	Recruit ratings: Scout: Rivals: (76)					
Trey Henderson; DE	Vancouver, BC	Vancouver College Prep	6 ft 3 in (1.91 m)	270 lb (120 kg)	4.90	Feb 4, 2007
Trey Henderson; DE	Recruit ratings: Scout: Rivals: (40)					
Overall recruit ranking: Scout: #2 Rivals: #2
‡ Refers to 40-yard dash; Note: In many cases, Scout, Rivals, 247Sports, On3, and ESPN may conflict in their listings of height, weight and 40 time.; In these cases, the average was taken. ESPN grades are on a 100-point scale.; Sources: "Southern Cal Commit List for 2007". Rivals.; "Scout.com Football Recruiting: USC". Scout.; "RecruitTracker 2007: USC". ESPN.; "Scout.com Team Recruiting Rankings". Scout.; "2007 Team Ranking". Rivals.com.

=== Transfers ===
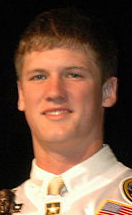
Mitch Mustain

In May, the Trojans were joined by former Arkansas quarterback Mitch Mustain, who had an 8–0 win–loss record as a starter during his freshman (and only) year with the team. Mustain joined fellow Arkansas teammate and wide receiver Damian Williams, who transferred from Arkansas before the 2006 bowl season. Due to NCAA transfer rules all would be unable to compete until 2008, although they would be allowed on the scout team.

In early summer, Jordan Cameron, a former freshman basketball player from Brigham Young University, also transferred to USC to play football as a wide receiver. However, when USC refused to accept some of Cameron's credits from Brigham Young, he was forced to withdraw and attend Ventura College. He missed the football season but was given the option to try to rejoin the team in 2008. Even if he had stayed at USC, due to NCAA transfer rules he would have been ineligible to play in 2007. Cameron ended up enrolling at USC a year later.

With the late 2006 dismissal of Troy Van Blarcom (academics) and the death of Mario Danelo, USC was left with only one experienced kicker: David Buehler, a 2006 junior college transfer from Santa Ana College who competed mainly at fullback and safety, but was used for one successful field goal attempt the previous season. In July 2007, Joe Houston, a junior college kicker from El Camino College, joined the team as a "preferred walk-on", guaranteed a non-scholarship spot on the team. As a junior college transfer, Houston would be able to play for the Trojans immediately. USC also recruited former Nebraska kicker, Jordan Congdon, who was not eligible for the 2007 season; and Brad Smith, formerly of Davidson College. Smith was able to play immediately under an NCAA rule that permits non-scholarship players who have already received a degree to transfer once with immediate eligibility.

=== Departures ===
Following the 2006 season, several players graduated, including starting senior All-Americans Steve Smith (wide receiver) and Ryan Kalil (center), as well as all-conference linebackers Dallas Sartz and Oscar Lua. Junior All-American Dwayne Jarrett, who was their leading receiver in 2005 and 2006, renounced his eligibility and joined the NFL.

The Trojans entered fall training camp with a high number of scholarship running backs (10), all of whom were highly touted recruits. In August, midway through camp, running back Emmanuel Moody announced he was leaving USC. Moody, who was the second-leading rusher in the 2006 season, had gained 458 yards on 79 carries in a rotating platoon of running backs in 2006 and had recently been one of three USC running backs appearing on the regional cover of Sports Illustrated's college football preview edition. Injuries had limited his playing and practice time: he suffered an ankle injury that caused him to miss the team's last four games of the 2006 season, then missed almost all of spring practice due to a hamstring injury. Halfway through the summer training camp, Moody bruised his knee and was forced to stop practicing. He wished to be a featured player and stated he had "felt forgotten" coming into training camp due to his recent lack of playing and practice time. After looking at several schools, including Oklahoma State and North Carolina, Moody transferred to the University of Florida.

At about the same time, backup receiver and redshirt freshman Jamere Holland was dismissed from the team, although not for any violation of team rules. He was allowed to stay on scholarship for the year. Holland redshirted the previous season after breaking his collarbone, reinjured it during spring practice and had clashed with coaches during his return to fall camp. He would later transfer to the University of Oregon.

=== Offseason news ===
On January 6, 2007, Shortly after the Trojans ended their 2006 season with a win at the 2007 Rose Bowl, two-year starting placekicker Mario Danelo was found dead at the bottom of a cliff in San Pedro, California. Danelo had been expected to start during the 2007 season. For the 2007 season, USC players wore a #19 sticker on their helmets in honor of Danelo; in addition the Kennedy-Jones practice field had the number "19" sprayed onto its end zones and the Coliseum hung a banner above the player's tunnel with Danelo's name and also paid tribute to him on the goal-post pads.

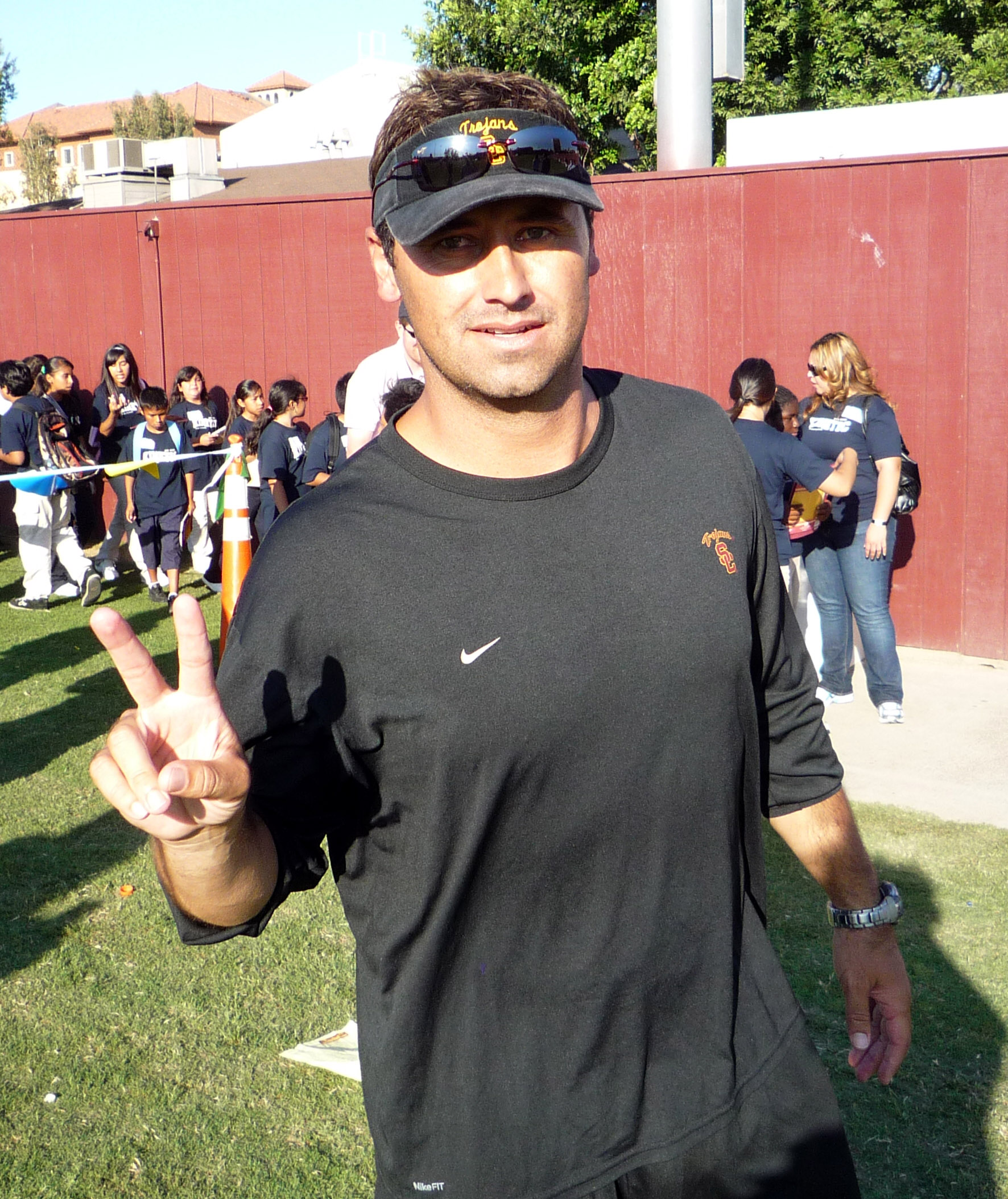
Sarkisian took over as Offensive Coordinator after Kiffin's departure.

The Trojans lost their offensive coordinator, Lane Kiffin, on January 23, 2007, when he was hired to be the new head coach of the Oakland Raiders; the 31-year-old Kiffin became the youngest head coach in Raiders history, and the youngest head coach since the formation of the modern NFL. Shortly after Kiffin's departure, Pete Carroll named Steve Sarkisian as his team's new offensive coordinator. Sarkisian had interviewed with the Raiders for their vacant head coach position but withdrew from the process to stay at USC, where he had been the assistant head coach and quarterbacks coach.

Intra-conference controversy arose in March 2007, when Stanford coach Jim Harbaugh was quoted as saying "[Pete Carroll]'s only got one more year, though. He'll be there one more year. That's what I've heard. I heard it inside the staff." Upon further questions, Harbaugh claimed he had heard it from staff at USC. At the Pac-10 Conference media day (July 26, 2007), Harbaugh praised the Trojans, stating "There is no question in my mind that USC is the best team in the country and may be the best team in the history of college football"; the declaration, especially in light of his earlier comment, garnered more media attention.

In early July, LSU coach Les Miles stirred inter-conference controversy when he publicly criticized USC's 2007 schedule in front of LSU boosters; though the two schools had not played each other since 1984, the LSU Tiger faithful maintained a strong grudge against the Trojans after they shared the national title in the controversial 2003 season. LSU and Michigan were ranked as the pre-season No. 2 team in various polls.

== Schedule ==
The 2007 Trojans schedule was ranked the 8th hardest in the country. Before the season, the road schedule was ranked as the 6th toughest. Within the Pac-10, the schedule ranked as the 2nd toughest.

Date	Time	Opponent	Rank	Site	TV	Result	Attendance
September 1	7:15 p.m.	Idaho*	No. 1	Los Angeles Memorial Coliseum; Los Angeles, CA	FSN	W 38–10	90,917
September 15	5:00 p.m.	at No. 14 Nebraska*	No. 1	Memorial Stadium; Lincoln, NE (College GameDay)	ABC	W 49–31	84,959
September 22	5:00 p.m.	Washington State	No. 1	Los Angeles Memorial Coliseum; Los Angeles, CA	ABC	W 47–14	86,876
September 29	5:00 p.m.	at Washington	No. 1	Husky Stadium; Seattle, WA	ABC	W 27–24	68,654
October 6	4:00 p.m.	Stanford	No. 2	Los Angeles Memorial Coliseum; Los Angeles, CA (rivalry)	Versus	L 23–24	85,125
October 13	12:30 p.m.	Arizona	No. 10	Los Angeles Memorial Coliseum; Los Angeles, CA	ABC	W 20–13	84,671
October 20	12:30 p.m.	at Notre Dame*	No. 13	Notre Dame Stadium; Notre Dame, IN (Jeweled Shillelagh)	NBC	W 38–0	80,795
October 27	12:00 p.m.	at No. 5 Oregon	No. 9	Autzen Stadium; Eugene, OR	FSN	L 17–24	59,277
November 3	5:00 p.m.	Oregon State^{†}	No. 13	Los Angeles Memorial Coliseum; Los Angeles, CA	ABC	W 24–3	85,713
November 10	5:00 p.m.	at No. 24 California	No. 12	California Memorial Stadium; Berkeley, CA	ABC	W 24–17	72,516
November 22	5:00 p.m.	at No. 7 Arizona State	No. 11	Sun Devil Stadium; Tempe, AZ	ESPN	W 44–24	71,706
December 1	1:30 p.m.	UCLA	No. 8	Los Angeles Memorial Coliseum; Los Angeles, CA (Victory Bell)	ABC	W 24–7	91,553
January 1, 2008	1:30 p.m.	No. 13 Illinois*	No. 6	Rose Bowl; Pasadena, CA (Rose Bowl) (College GameDay)	ABC	W 49–17	93,293
*Non-conference game; ^{†}Homecoming; Rankings from AP Poll released prior to the game; All times are in Pacific time

== Roster ==
Wide receiver: 1 Patrick Turner – Junior; 7 Vidal Hazelton – Sophomore; 8 Ronald Johnson – Freshman; 9 David Ausberry – (redshirt) Freshman; 14 Garrett Green* – Sophomore; 17 Travon Patterson – Sophomore; 18 Damian Williams – Sophomore++; ~~18 Jamere Holland – (redshirt) Freshman~~; 41 Aubey Layno-Moses* – Freshman; 46 Sean Calcagnie* – (redshirt) Freshman; 47 Scott Stephens* – (redshirt) Freshman; 48 Brad Walker – Senior; 80 Brandon Carswell – Freshman; 81 Spencer Vigoren* – (redshirt) Freshman; 82 Duron Sylvester* – (redshirt) Freshman; 87 Caleb Nelan* – Freshman; Center: 61 Kristofer O'Dowd – Freshman; 69 Matt Spanos – (redshirt) Senior; 76 Nick Howell – (redshirt) Sophomore; Offensive guard: 53 Jeff Byers – (redshirt) Junior; 66 Chilo Rachal – (redshirt) Junior; 70 Alatini Malu – (redshirt) Senior; 74 Zach Heberer – (redshirt) Freshman; Offensive tackle: 60 Drew Radovich – (redshirt) Senior; 62 David Clinco* – (redshirt) Sophomore; 67 Michael Reardon – Freshman; 68 Butch Lewis – (redshirt) Freshman; 71 Charles Brown – (redshirt) Sophomore; 72 Martin Coleman – Freshman; 77 Thomas Herring – (redshirt) Sophomore; 78 Andrew Weiss* – (redshirt) Junior; 79 Sam Baker – (redshirt) Senior; Tight end: 40 Rhett Ellison – Freshman; 83 Fred Davis – Senior; 86 Anthony McCoy – Sophomore; 88 Jimmy Miller – (redshirt) Junior; 89 Dale Thompson – Senior	Quarterback: 6 Mark Sanchez – (redshirt) Sophomore; 15 Aaron Corp – Freshman; 10 John David Booty – (redshirt) Senior; 16 Michael McDonald – (redshirt) Senior; 16 Mitch Mustain – Sophomore++; 17 Jon Breuer* – (redshirt) Sophomore; Tailback: 2 C. J. Gable – Sophomore; 4 Joe McKnight – Freshman; 13 Stafon Johnson – Sophomore; 21 Allen Bradford – Sophomore; 22 Desmond Reed – Senior; 23 Chauncey Washington – (redshirt) Senior; 26 Marc Tyler – Freshman; ~~28 Emmanuel Moody – Sophomore~~; 29 Broderick Green – Freshman; 34 Hershel Dennis – (redshirt) Senior; Fullback: 31 Stanley Havili – (redshirt) Freshman; 35 Jody Adewale – (redshirt) Senior; 37 Jordan Campbell – Freshman; 39 Alfred Rowe – (redshirt) Freshman; 45 Adam Goodman – (redshirt) Sophomore; 85 Cooper Stephenson* – (redshirt) Freshman; Nose tackle: 44 Christian Tupou – Freshman; 49 Sedrick Ellis – (redshirt) Senior; 90 Derek Simmons – (redshirt) Freshman; 99 Averell Spicer – (redshirt) Sophomore; Defensive tackle: 56 Alex Parsons – Sophomore; 75 Fili Moala – (redshirt) Junior; 95 Lawrence Miles – (redshirt) Junior; 98 DaJohn Harris – Freshman; Defensive end: 67 Michael Reardon – Freshman; 81 Gerald Washington – (redshirt) Junior; 84 Kyle Moore – Junior; 92 Trey Henderson – Freshman; 93 Everson Griffen – Freshman; 96 Lawrence Jackson – (redshirt) Senior; 97 Alex Morrow – (redshirt) Senior	Cornerback: 7 Cary Harris – Junior; 15 Kevin Thomas – Junior; 22 Jim Abbott* – (redshirt) Junior; 23 Vincent Joseph – Sophomore; 24 Shareece Wright – Sophomore; 25 Daniel Harper* – Freshman; 28 Terrell Thomas – (redshirt) Senior; 42 Omari Crittenden* – Sophomore; 48 Matthew Jordan – (redshirt) Sophomore; Linebacker: 6 Malcolm Smith – Freshman; 10 Brian Cushing – Junior; 43 Kaluka Maiava – Junior; 41 Thomas Williams – (redshirt) Senior; 46 Michael Morgan – (redshirt) Freshman; 47 Clay Matthews – (redshirt) Junior; 51 Joshua Tatum – (redshirt) Freshman; 52 Luther Brown – (redshirt) Sophomore; 54 Chris Galippo – Freshman; 55 Keith Rivers – Senior; 57 Nick Garratt* – (redshirt) Sophomore; 58 Rey Maualuga – Junior; 59 Dan Deckas* – (redshirt) Freshman; Safety: 2 Taylor Mays – Sophomore; 4 Kevin Ellison – Junior; 9 Mozique McCurtis – (redshirt) Junior; 26 Will Harris – (redshirt) Sophomore; 27 Marshall Jones – Freshman; 29 Brent Yoshida* – (redshirt) Senior; 30 Chase McWhorter* – (redshirt) Senior; 35 Justin Hart – (redshirt) Sophomore; 36 Josh Pinkard – (redshirt) Junior; 38 Robert Erickson* – (redshirt) Freshman; Long snapper: 50 Will Collins – (redshirt) Senior; 63 Christian Putnam* – (redshirt) Sophomore; Punter: 25 Billy O'Malley* – (redshirt) Freshman; 44 Greg Woidneck – (redshirt) Junior; Place kicker: 18 David Buehler – Junior; 30 Joe Houston* – Sophomore; 38 Jordon Congdon – Junior++; 45 Brad Smith* – (redshirt) Senior
Sources: 2007 USC Trojans Football Media Guide, USC Official Depth Chart, USC Athletics, 2008 Rose Bowl Media Guide: (redshirt) indicates that the player redshirted, sitting out a year; * indicates that the player is a "walk-on"; ++ indicates that the player is a transfer who is ineligible to play 2007 season but is allowed to practice with scout team; Players who left the team are struck out

== Coaching staff ==
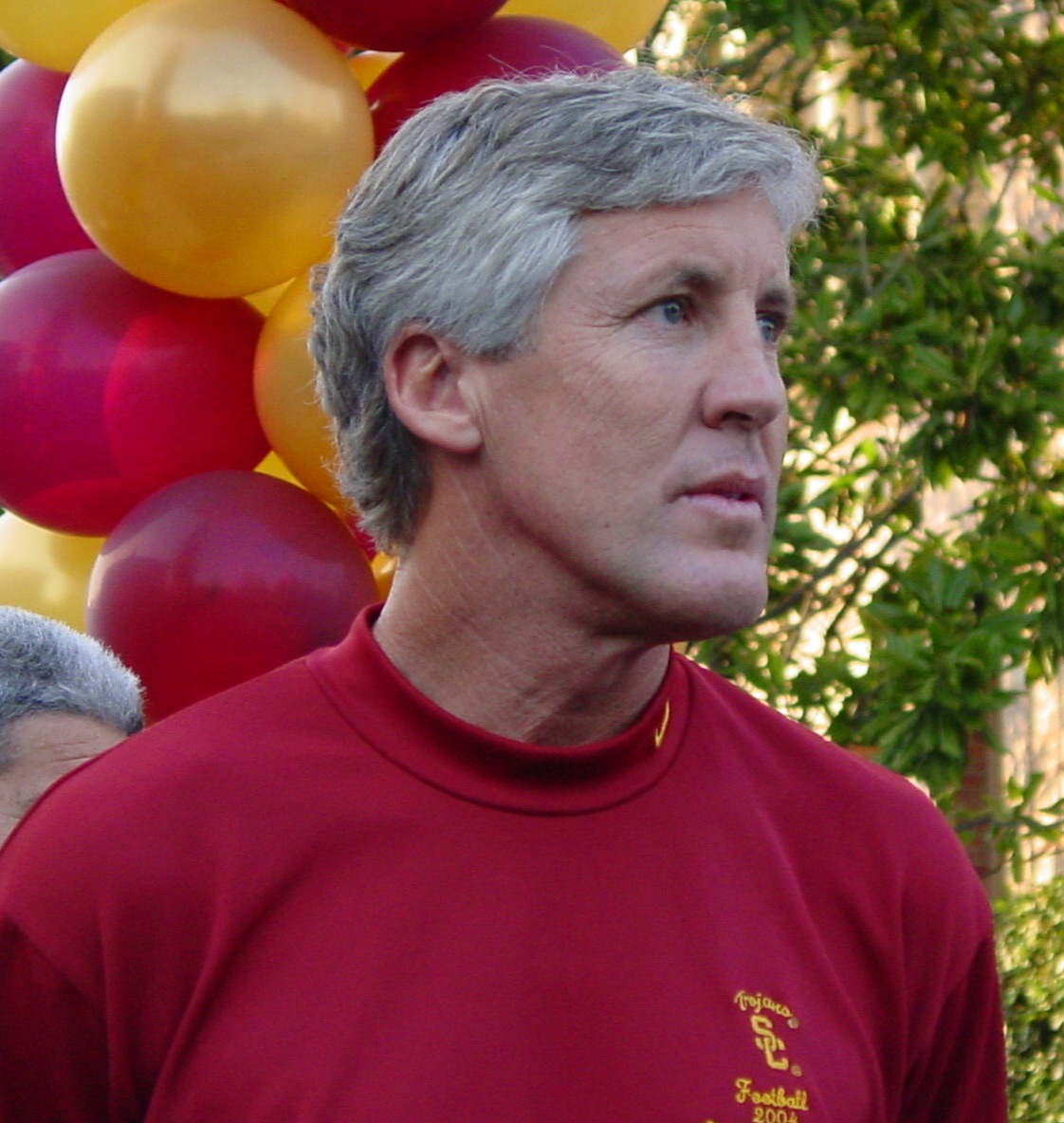
Pete Carroll, head coach

Name	Position	Year at USC	Alma mater (year)
Pete Carroll	Head coach	7th	Pacific (1973)
Steve Sarkisian	Offensive coordinator Quarterbacks	6th 2001–2003, 2005–	BYU (1997)
Nick Holt	Defensive coordinator Defensive line	5th 2001–2003, 2006–	Pacific (1986)
Todd McNair	Running backs Special teams coordinator	4th	Temple (1988)
Brennan Carroll	Tight ends Recruiting coordinator	6th	Pittsburgh (2001)
John Morton	Wide receivers Passing Game Coordinator	1st	Western Michigan (1992)
Ken Norton Jr.	Linebackers	4th	UCLA (1988)
Pat Ruel	Offensive line	3rd	Miami (1972)
Rocky Seto	Secondary	9th	USC (1999)
David Watson	Defensive line	2nd	Western Illinois (2001)
Chris Carlisle	Strength and conditioning	7th	Chadron State (1985)

== Game summaries ==
=== Idaho ===
Team	1	2	3	4	Total
Idaho	0	3	0	7	10
• USC	14	7	17	0	38

- Date: September 1
- Location: Los Angeles Memorial Coliseum, Los Angeles

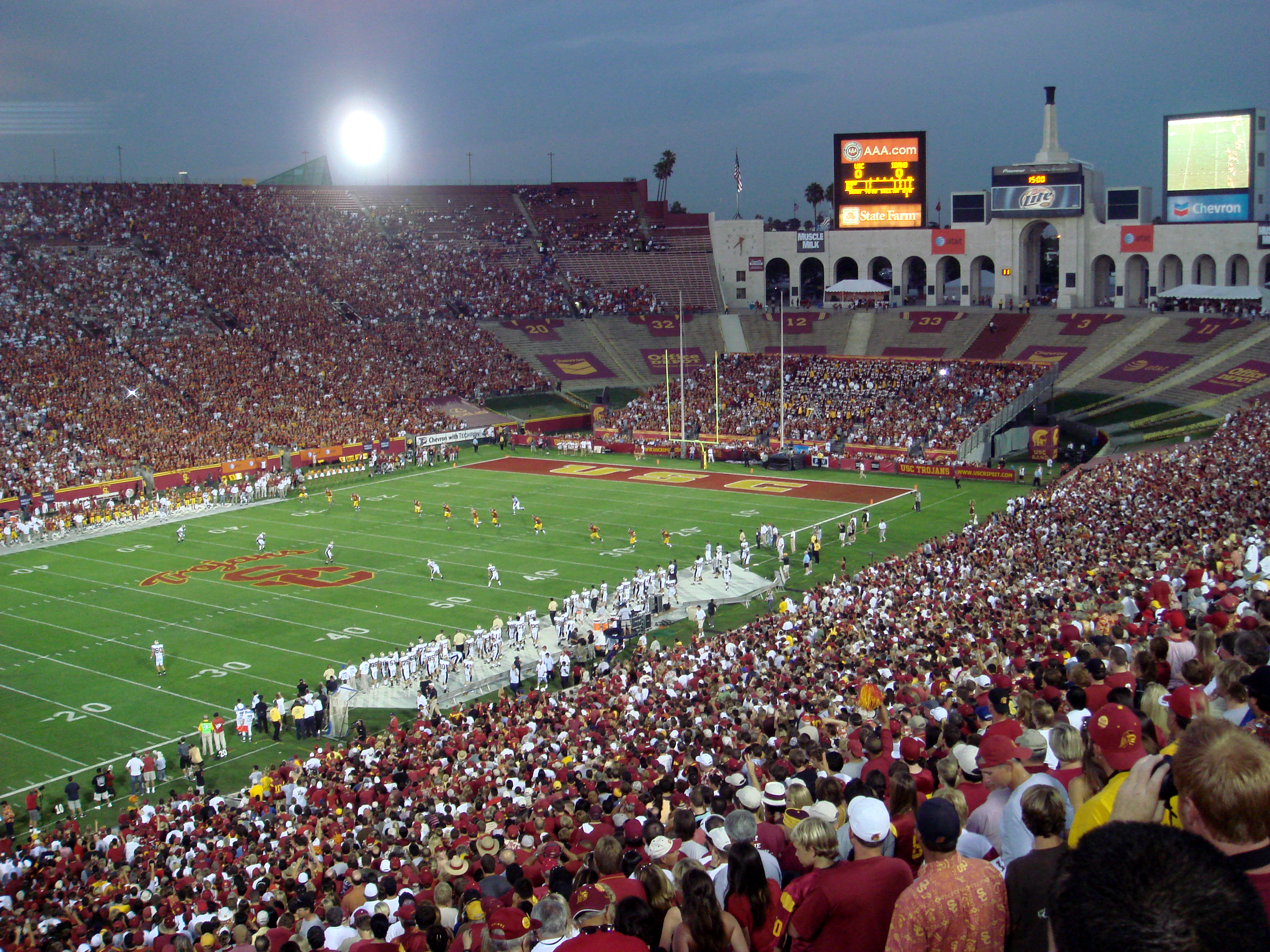
The opening kick off of USC's 2007 season.

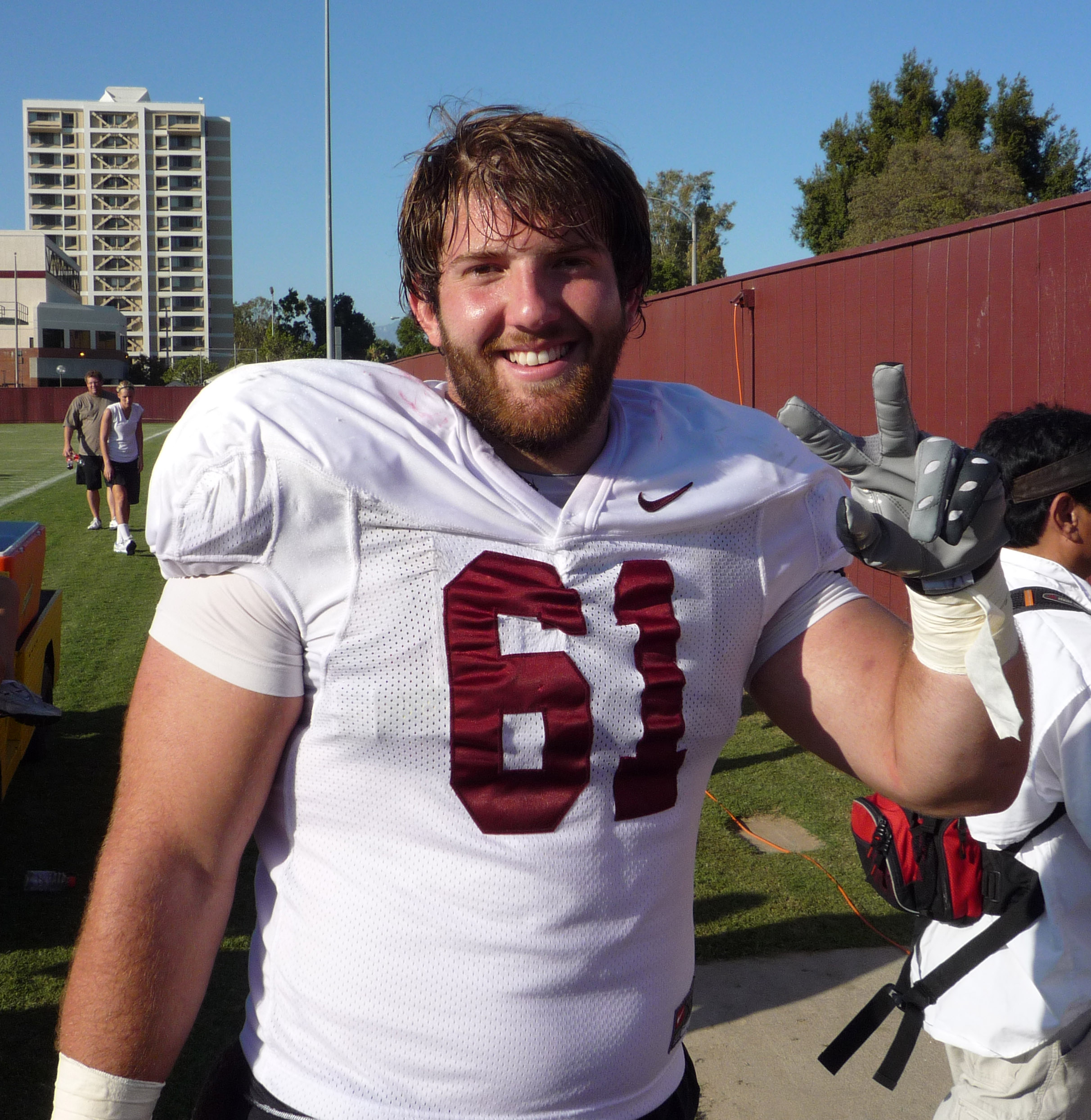
Kristofer O'Dowd became the first true freshman to start at center for USC.

USC opened its season hosting the University of Idaho Vandals of the Western Athletic Conference, under first year coach Robb Akey. Trojans Defensive Coordinator Nick Holt had previously been the head coach of the Idaho Vandals for two seasons (2004–05); before that he was USC's linebackers coach from 2001–03 under Carroll (Holt had been an assistant coach at Idaho for eight seasons, from 1990 to 1997). The game was scheduled in 2005, during Holt's tenure with the Vandals. After Holt's sudden resignation in early 2006, Idaho tried to get out of the game to no avail; the Vandals athletic program received $600,000 for their appearance in the game. The last time the Vandals played USC, in 1929, they were in the same conference, the Pacific Coast Conference. During their time as conference rivals, USC dominated the Vandals, winning all seven games between 1922 and 1929 by a combined score of 215–20. USC entered the 2007 contest as six-touchdown favorites.

USC controlled the game, but did not exert the level of domination expected. After taking a 21–0 lead into the second quarter, the offense showed signs of sputtering; the second teams took over for the 4th quarter. Booty completed 21 of 32 passes for 206 yards, threw for three touchdowns and one interception; though he did not convert on a fourth down play in short yardage and was unable to find a rhythm. Primary receiver Patrick Turner was held out of the game to recover from a stinger received in the previous week's practice; cornerback Josh Pinkard was also held out to recover from knee soreness. As a result, young receivers David Ausberry and Vidal Hazelton handled the primary wide receiver duties. The highlight of the Trojans offense was the running game, which rushed for 214 yards while Idaho was held to 98. The role was run by committee: with the debut of redshirt freshman Stafon Johnson (64 yards in 12 carries, two touchdown runs), who scored the first touchdown of the game, as well as C.J. Gable (68 yards in eight carries, one touchdown reception), who made an impressive 33-yard run, and fullback Stanley Havili who made several receptions, including one for a touchdown. The game marked the debut of USC true freshman running back Joe McKnight, who made a spectacular run in the third quarter that was likened to those of predecessor Reggie Bush. Kristofer O'Dowd became the first true freshman to start at center for the Trojans due to an injury to Matt Spanos, earning positive reviews for his performance. Although the defense did not cause many turnovers and lost key linebacker Brian Cushing to an ankle sprain in the first quarter, it met enough expectations to remain ranked among the top defenses in the country.

In honor of Trojans kicker Mario Danelo, who died just after the 2006 season, a special ceremony was held before the beginning of the game. Also, after scoring its first touchdown, USC intentionally lined up for the PAT without a kicker in tribute to their late teammate, taking a 5-yard delay of game penalty before David Buehler came on the field to kick the extra point. The moment was chosen by ESPN as one of the Pac-10's Top 10 Moments Of BCS Era.

=== Nebraska ===
Team	1	2	3	4	Total
• USC	7	14	21	7	49
Nebraska	7	3	0	21	31

- Date: September 15
- Location: Memorial Stadium, Lincoln, Nebraska

After a bye week, the Trojans visited the Nebraska Cornhuskers in Lincoln, Nebraska. In the pre-season, the game was named as one of the candidates for the 10 most important games of 2007. For the Huskers, the game was especially critical to their hopes of showing progress under 4th year head coach Bill Callahan. The game marked the first time a No. 1-ranked team visited Lincoln since 1978. Because of the game's significance, ESPN College GameDay chose it as the site of its weekly broadcast.

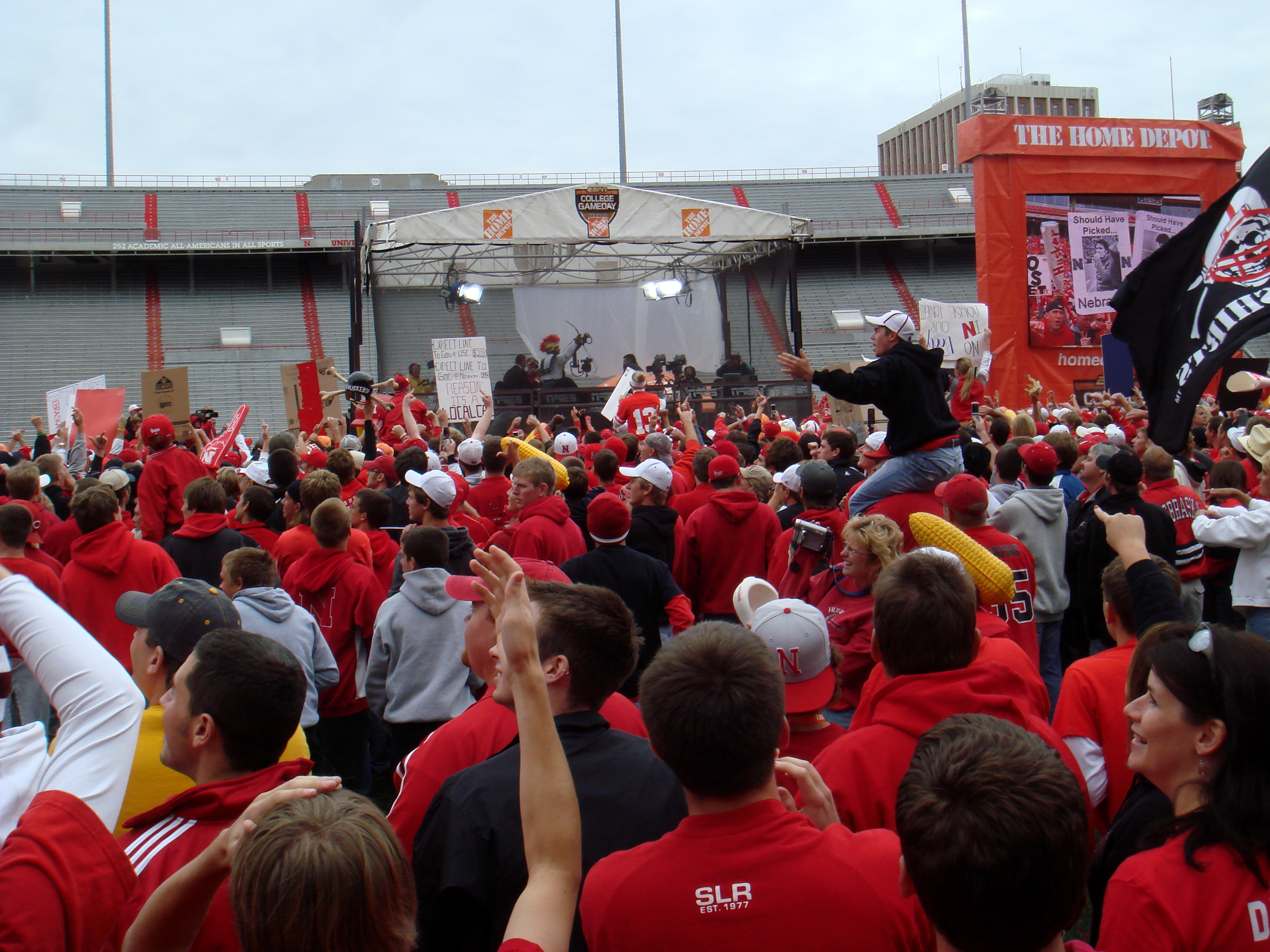
ESPN College GameDay: Cornhusker fans react negatively to Lee Corso's decision to pick USC to win the game; as per tradition, he dons the gear of the team he picks.

Callahan had been criticized for his conservative play-calling during the 2006 game in Los Angeles; instead of playing to win, it appeared the Huskers were playing to not get blown out by the then-favored Trojans. In that game the normally prolific West Coast offense of Nebraska, which had produced 541 yards a game, was corralled on the ground and attempted only 17 passes in a 28–10 Husker loss. For 2007, Callahan pledged to play more aggressively, using running back Marlon Lucky and quarterback Sam Keller. Keller, the Huskers redshirt senior starting quarterback, was a 2006 transfer from Arizona State; as a Sun Devil Keller started the first seven games of his 2005 junior season, throwing for 2,165 yards, before a disastrous game against USC where, after leading ASU to a 21–3 halftime lead, he and the offense fell apart on the way to a 38–28 loss where he was sacked five times and threw five interceptions. Due to NCAA transfer rules, Keller spent the 2006 season on the Huskers' scout team.

The Trojans stayed in nearby Omaha and practiced at a local high school; Carroll took the rare step of closing practice to outsiders after a local radio station announced the location. The game marked the return of primary receiver Patrick Turner and running back Chauncey Washington from injury; linebacker Brian Cushing, who injured his ankle early against Idaho, had not fully recovered but was allowed to suit-up as a reserve. Senior center Matt Spanos remained injured, and true freshman Kris O'Dowd was called to start again. Veteran secondary member Josh Pinkard was lost for the season after his sore knee gave out during a bye week practice, resulting in a torn ACL requiring surgery.

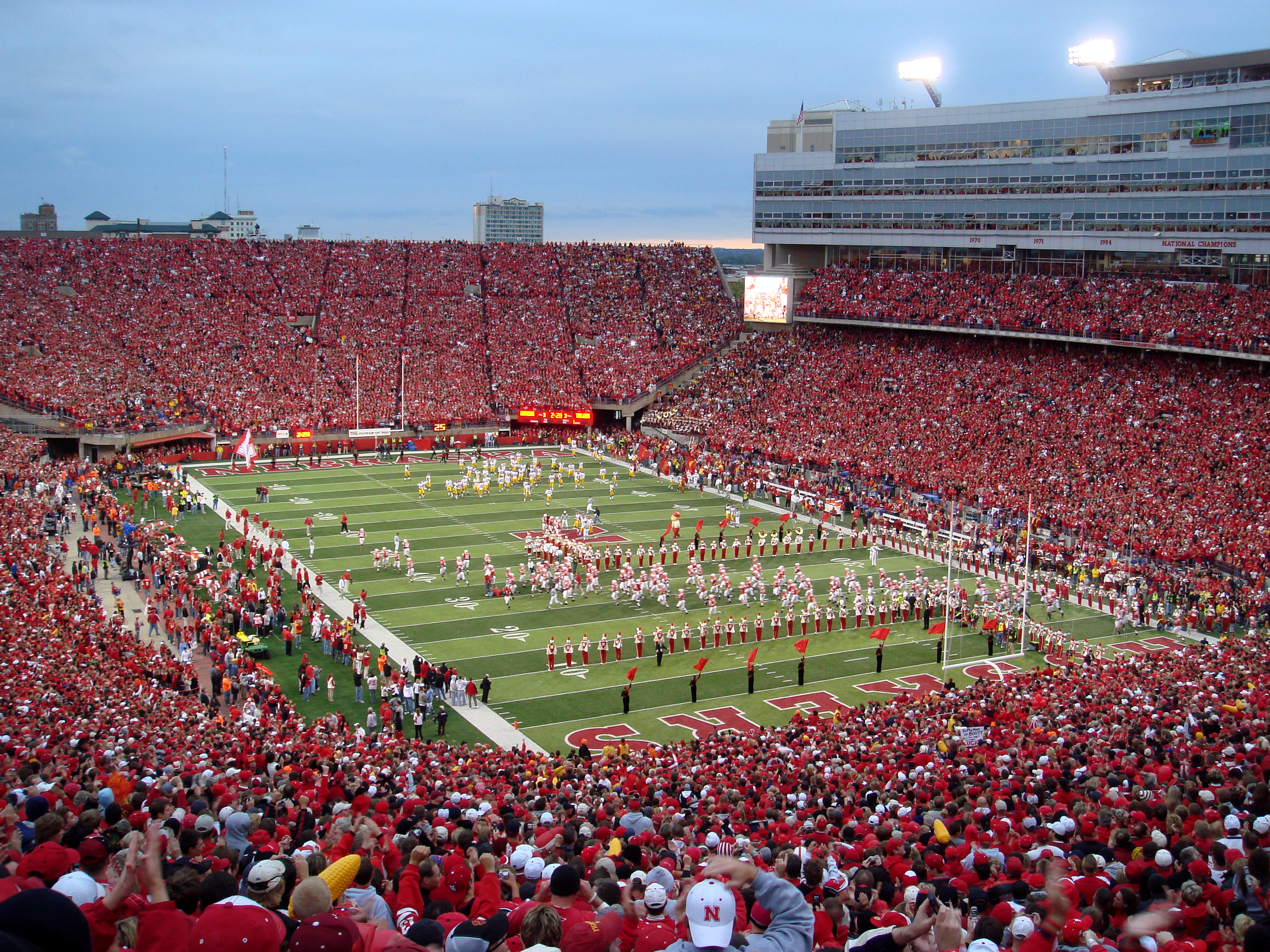
Teams take the field as Nebraska hosted USC for its 284th consecutive home sell out at Memorial Stadium.

Anticipation for the game was high in Lincoln, fueling strong demand for tickets and accommodations; the game brought celebrities including USC fans Will Ferrell (also an alumnus) and Keanu Reeves, Nebraska fans Larry the Cable Guy, Supreme Court Justice Clarence Thomas, Rush Limbaugh, and Ward Connerly; past Husker Heisman-winner Mike Rozier, Trojans Heisman-winner Marcus Allen and star Trojans safety Ronnie Lott were also on hand for the game. The game fell on Pete Carroll's 56th birthday; as a surprise, Carroll was treated to a recorded message by actor Kiefer Sutherland, star of his favorite television show, 24. The morning recording of College GameDay attracted 13,293 fans, second to the all-time record of 15,808 set by Nebraska in 2001. With 84,959 in attendance, Nebraska recorded its NCAA-record 284th consecutive home sellout dating back to 1962.

USC dominated the game 49–31, in a game that was not as close as the final score indicated: the Trojans led 42–10 going into the fourth quarter; Nebraska scored two touchdowns in the final five minutes during garbage time. The Trojans dominated on the ground, as they out-gained Nebraska 313–31 in rushing yards and averaged 8.2 yards per carry, the most ever against a Nebraska team. Stafon Johnson led USC running backs with a career-best 144 yards in 11 carries with one touchdown; other major contributors were C.J. Gable (69 yards in four carries, including a 40-yard run), Washington (43 yards in 12 carries with two touchdowns), and another versatile performance by fullback Stanley Havili (52 rushing yards in two rushes with one touchdown, and three pass receptions for 22 yards with one touchdown). The Trojans passing game again did not find a rhythm, with several dropped passes, but the defense was able to frustrate the Husker offense for most of the game and cause two pivotal 3rd quarter interceptions.

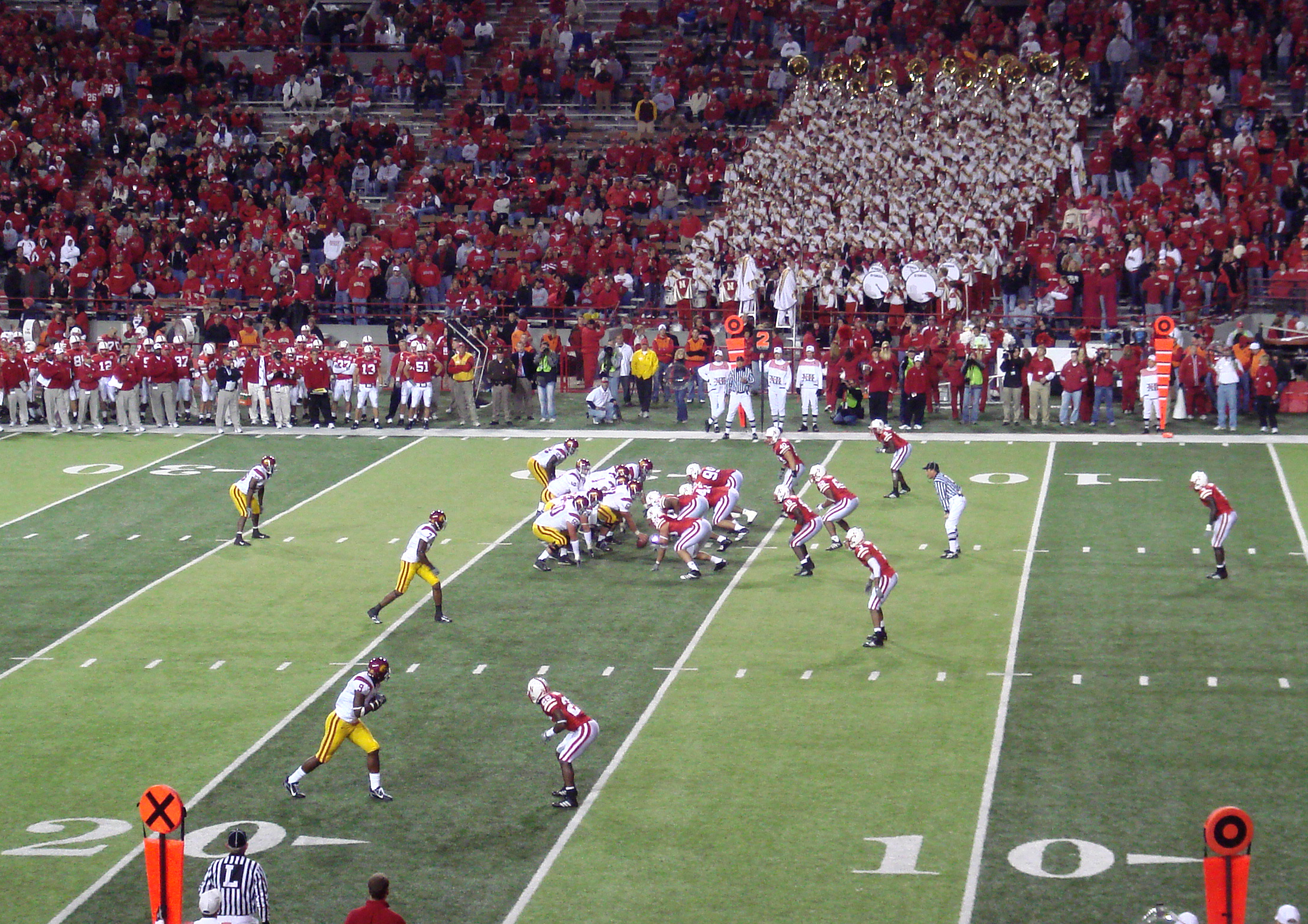
John David Booty leads a drive early in the fourth quarter.

The Trojans did not escape injuries, as linebacker Clay Matthews, substituting for the recovering Brian Cushing, broke his thumb, causing Cushing to enter the game as his replacement. The Trojans also suffered two injuries on kick returns: fullback Alfred Rowe suffered a mild concussion, and there was a moment of worry when returner Vincent Joseph, after being tackled and fumbling the ball, lay on the turf for over 10 minutes before being removed by stretcher with a bruised larynx and a neck sprain, but no serious injuries. Linebacker Rey Maualuga was flagged during a field goal attempt for the rarely called penalty of "disconcerting", which is given for "words or signals that disconcert opponents when they are preparing to put the ball in play".

After losing first place votes in the polls during the bye week, USC's performance regained six after their performance against the Huskers in a hostile environment. Receiving specific praise was the Trojans offensive line, as well as the continued poise and ability of freshman center O'Dowd.

=== Washington State ===
Team	1	2	3	4	Total
Washington St	7	0	7	0	14
• USC	14	13	13	7	47

- Date: September 22
- Location: Los Angeles Memorial Coliseum, Los Angeles, California

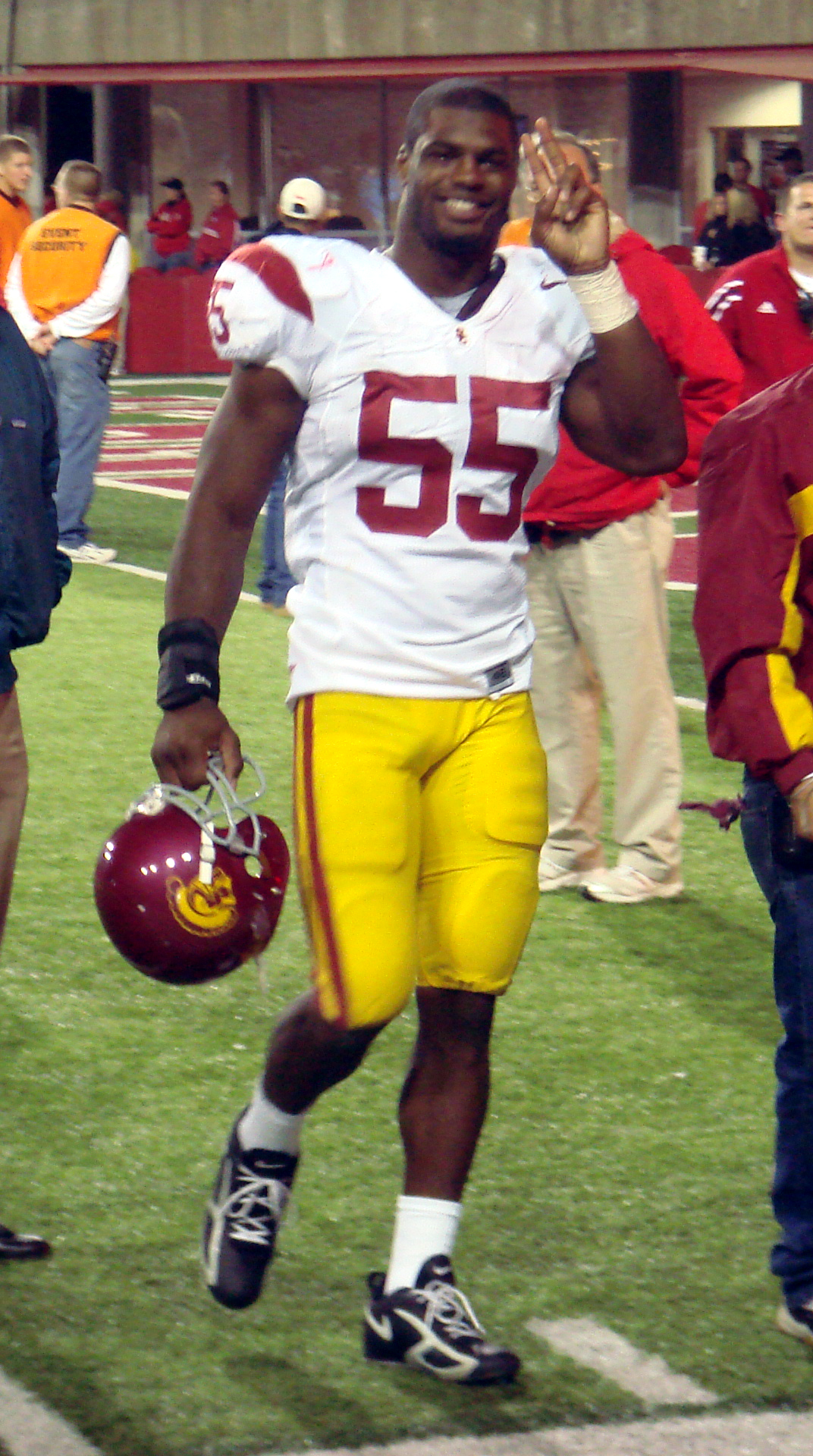
Linebacker Keith Rivers had a game-high 14 tackles, including 2 1/2 for losses. Rivers wore the #55 jersey, a number USC only issues to a promising linebacker.

USC opened Pac-10 conference play by hosting the Washington State Cougars. Entering the game, Trojans quarterback John David Booty and the receiver corp remained unproven after an uninspiring performance against Idaho and a run-dominated game against Nebraska. Hoping to take advantage, Washington State elected to go into the game using a man-to-man pass coverage to allow more focus on stopping the Trojans running game. The Cougars had given the then-No. 3 Trojans a scare in their 2006 meeting, with the game coming down to the final seconds.

In the end, USC routed the Cougars 47–14, with a primarily aerial attack. Booty reestablished his presence, completing 28 of 35 passes for 279 yards and four touchdowns before leaving the game early in the fourth quarter. Tight end Fred Davis had a career night with nine receptions for 124 yards and two touchdowns. Davis' performance marked the most yards receiving ever in a game by a Trojans tight end. The Trojans' first offensive drive set the tone with 13 plays, 83 yards and a touchdown on fourth down; mostly coming from the air. Receivers Patrick Turner and Vidal Hazelton were able to find a groove and make plays after sputtering against Nebraska. In the rushing game, Chauncey Washington started and rushed for 84 of USC's 207 yards. Stafon Johnson, who led the Trojans ground game against Nebraska, had nine carries and finished with 48 yards. Joe McKnight also got his first extended work and gained 48 yards in seven carries. USC built a 27–7 halftime lead and then scored on its first three possessions in the second half. The Trojans defense kept the Cougars in check, putting pressure on quarterback Alex Brink and limiting Washington State to 64 yards rushing.

Junior cornerback Cary Harris dislocated his right shoulder during the game and was replaced by Shareece Wright. Linebacker Brian Cushing reinjured the ankle he sprained in the opener against Idaho. Sixth-year senior running back Hershel Dennis played for the first time since the 2004 season during the fourth quarter, gaining 14 yards in four carries; he had sat out the two previous seasons due to injury.

The victory continued the Trojans' domination of the series, 55–8–4; it also extended the record of top-ranked USC teams against the Cougars to 5–0. The game marked the first time it had ever rained during a USC game in September; as a result the attendance was 86,876, the first time in 16 home games that the Trojans failed to draw at least 90,000. USC extended its home winning streak to 35 games.

=== Washington ===
Team	1	2	3	4	Total
• USC	0	17	7	3	27
Washington	0	14	0	10	24

- Date: September 29
- Location: Husky Stadium, Seattle, Washington

The Trojans played their first Pac-10 road game of the season, visiting the Washington Huskies under coach Tyrone Willingham, at Husky Stadium in Seattle, Washington. In 2006, the unranked Huskies gave No. 3 USC a scare; quarterback Isaiah Stanback led Washington to the USC 15 but the offense was unable to start a play before the final two seconds ticked off the clock, preserving a 26–20 USC victory. The Huskies entered the game 0–6 when facing a number-one ranked USC team.

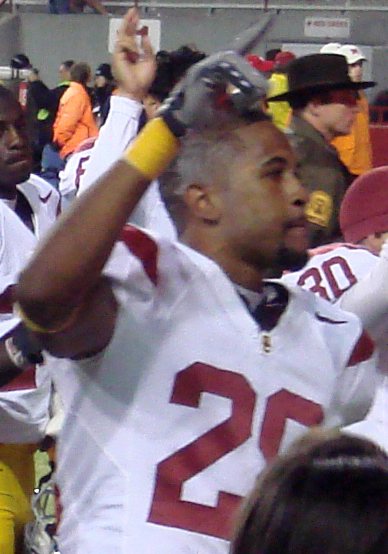
Cornerback Terrell Thomas caught the final onside kick.

Going into the 2007 contest, Carroll expressed concern about containing the Huskies redshirt freshman quarterback Jake Locker, a dual-threat quarterback who led his team in passing and rushing. The Huskies announced prior to the game that they would be wearing throwback uniforms: instead of their standard purple and gold, the Huskies wore dark blue and gold jerseys with plain, gold helmets that were replicas of those worn by the 1960 team that beat No. 1 Minnesota in the Rose Bowl, the only win for Washington over an opponent ranked number one.

In a day where half of the week's top-10 teams were defeated, USC escaped becoming the sixth in a messy, mistake-prone 27–24 victory in a wet, windy game in Seattle. Although USC had a 460–190 edge in total yards, their errors helped the Huskies significantly: They committed three turnovers and 16 penalties—their most in more than two seasons—for 161 yards, missed a field goal and had a punt blocked. A disappointed Pete Carroll noted "We just couldn't do more things wrong in the game [. . .] I thought Washington was there for it. They were there to take it. All they needed was one more chance."

USC quarterback John David Booty completed 20 of 37 passes for 236 yards and a touchdown but had two interceptions, one of which was returned 54 yards for a touchdown tying the game at 14–14 in the second quarter. The Huskies gained momentum early in the fourth quarter when they came to within 24–17 and forced USC to punt; however, on the return Terrell Thomas stripped the ball from Anthony Russo for a fumble and recovered the ball at the Huskies' 43 yard line, setting up David Buehler's 33-yard field goal with 3:01 remaining. The Huskies did not give up, blocked a USC punt with 1:15 left and scored on quarterback Jake Locker's one-yard run to pull to within three with 34 seconds left. On the ensuing onside kick, Thomas was able to recover the ball for USC, ending the game.

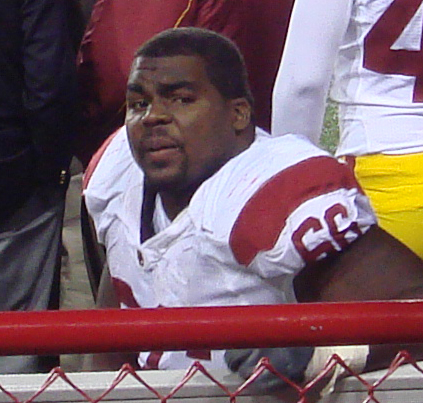
Offensive guard Chilo Rachal was one of several key players who suffered injuries in the game.

Locker displayed the dual passing/running threat Carroll had expressed concern about, but also showed his youth with erratic passing, finishing 12-for-27 with 83 yards passing and one interception, plus another 50 yards on 16 carries with two touchdowns. USC did have positive showings in the running game, with Stafon Johnson running for 122 yards and a touchdown and Chauncey Washington also adding 106 yards and a score. In the end, Carroll and the Trojans described the game as less a victory than an escape, a game where USC's raw athleticism took advantage of Washington's youth.

The Trojans suffered numerous injuries during the game: starting freshman center Kristofer O'Dowd hurt his kneecap and guard Chilo Rachal sprained his knee on the same play in the first quarter; they were replaced by senior center Matt Spanos, who had just been cleared for play after tearing a triceps before the season, and reserve guard Alatini Malu. Starting cornerback Shareece Wright, in his first start after replacing the injured Cary Harris, sustained a pulled hamstring muscle and was replaced by Mozique McCurtis. Tailback Stafon Johnson suffered a foot injury and fellow tailback C.J. Gable dressed but did not play because of a groin injury suffered just before the trip to Washington.

The game drew comparisons to USC's 33–31 loss to Oregon State the previous season. As a result of the close finish, USC lost the No. 1 ranking in the AP Poll, falling to No. 2 with 1,591 points and 32 first-place votes to LSU's 1,593 points and 33 first-place votes; however, the Trojans remained No. 1 in the Coaches Poll, keeping a more substantial lead: 1,483 points and 45 first-place votes to LSU's 1,454 points and 14 first-place votes.

=== Stanford ===
Team	1	2	3	4	Total
• Stanford	0	0	7	17	24
USC	3	6	7	7	23

- Date: October 6
- Location: Los Angeles Memorial Coliseum, Los Angeles, California

USC continued Pac-10 play by hosting the struggling Stanford Cardinal, under first-year coach Jim Harbaugh. In a major upset, USC stumbled at home to the 41 point underdog, losing 24–23.

Harbaugh made headlines prior to the season by claiming 2007 would be Carroll's last year with USC before departing to the NFL, drawing a terse rebuke from Carroll; Harbaugh later called the 2007 Trojans one of the best teams in history at the Pac-10 Media Day, reiterating the position in the week before their game. However, there were no hard feelings between the coaches. The two kept in cordial phone contact and Carroll made light of Harbaugh's comments several times during the season.

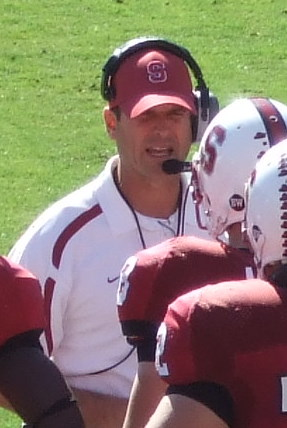
First-year Stanford Coach Jim Harbaugh led Stanford to an unexpected victory over the heavily favored Trojans.

The Stanford starting quarterback, redshirt senior T. C. Ostrander, suffered a seizure on the afternoon of September 30, one day after their game against Arizona State; he was released from Stanford Hospital after a few hours, but as a precautionary measure he was held out of the game against USC. The starting quarterback position fell to Tavita Pritchard, a redshirt sophomore with three passes in his college career. Stanford was also without two other key starters: defensive lineman Ekom Udofia (ankle) and offensive lineman Allen Smith (knee). On October 3 it was announced that USC running back C.J. Gable, who was averaging a team-best 11 yards a carry, would undergo season-ending abdominal surgery to correct a nagging sports hernia that had limited his ability since the previous season; because he had only played in the first three games, he would seek a medical redshirt season. Gable's fellow running back, Stafon Johnson, was also held out of the game due to a foot bruise suffered the previous week.

Stanford was the last team to beat USC at the Coliseum, doing so on September 29, 2001, under Tyrone Willingham, against then-first year coach Carroll. By game week, the line for the game favored the Trojans by 39.5 points, and reached 41 points by gametime. The loss ended multiple USC streaks, including a five-game win streak against Stanford and a 35-game home winning streak. For sportsbooks, the loss to a 41-point underdog marked the biggest upset in their history.

There were a few positive efforts for the Trojans: Tight end Fred Davis caught five passes for a career-best 152 yards, including a 63-yard touchdown; and nose tackle Sedrick Ellis had three sacks. However, there were many more errors and substandard performances: quarterback John David Booty, who broke a bone in the middle finger of his throwing hand in the first half, had four passes intercepted in the second half. The offensive line had been suffering since losing two starters in one play during the previous week's game at Washington, but the effect was severe against Stanford; the offensive line gave up four sacks, one more than the Trojans had surrendered all season, and USC gained only 95 yards rushing. Key receiver Patrick Turner dropped several passes, the defense gave up 17 points in the fourth quarter and USC had an extra-point attempt blocked, a point which became a crucial difference. Like their previous game against Washington, USC out-gained Stanford by 224 yards (459 to 235) but made many crucial turnovers and penalties. In the press conference following the game, Coach Carroll summarized his concerns: "It's real clear that we have fallen out of line with our philosophy that has guided this program for years; we're turning the ball over too much."

Opinions in the sports press ranged from proclaiming the end of the USC's era of dominance in college football to calling the loss a major, but not fatal set-back to any hopes for a Trojans run at the national championship. The Trojans fell to No. 10 in the AP Poll; however, USC only fell to No. 7 in both the Coaches Poll and Harris Poll, both of which are the human components for determining who the BCS chooses for the National Championship Game. As a result, USC remained in outside title contention with upcoming games against consensus-No. 2 California and top-10 Oregon. The upset landed the Trojans in ESPN.com's Bottom 10.

In an interview the following month, Carroll assessed the mistakes that led to the loss as his own:

We really blew it against Stanford. We screwed it up because we played a guy that was hurt. I made a mistake on that. That was me. ... If anything really was a factor, it was my cockiness that there was no way we could lose a game. It didn't matter — we could keep running our offense, keep working on stuff, and they would never beat us. ... Broken hand? What was I thinking? I'm the one that screwed it up. He's a warrior. He's the one telling me "I can play." That's what he should be telling me. ... I missed a big one. It cost us a game that really cost us the flavor of this season. We've been tainted ever since, for obvious reasons. We gave away a game to a team that's won two or three games. Amazing. But it's awesome for football, it's awesome for Stanford and all that. Great for those guys. Sucks to be us in that regard. We screwed it up.

At the end of the regular season, Sports Illustrated chose Stanford's upset of USC as the second "Biggest Upset of 2007" after Division I FCS Appalachian State's upset of No. 5 Michigan.

=== Arizona ===
Team	1	2	3	4	Total
Arizona	0	10	3	0	13
• USC	7	3	0	10	20

- Date: October 13
- Location: Los Angeles Memorial Coliseum, Los Angeles, California
- TV announcers (ESPN): Dan Fouts (Play by Play), Tim Brant (Analyst), Todd Harris (Sideline)

After the previous week's upset loss to Stanford, the Trojans hosted the Arizona Wildcats, led by head coach Mike Stoops, aiming to correct mistakes and demonstrate that they were still in contention for the Pac-10 title and to remain an outside candidate for the national title game. Matters were complicated when it was announced that starting quarterback John David Booty would not start due to a broken middle finger on his throwing hand, suffered during the previous week's loss. As a result, redshirt sophomore Mark Sanchez made his first start for the Trojans; previously he had only played during garbage time. The Trojans also remained without offensive linemen Chilo Rachal and Kris O'Dowd, as well as leading rusher Stafon Johnson, who remained idle for a second week after bruising his left foot during the game against Washington. The Trojans entered the game a 21-point favorite.

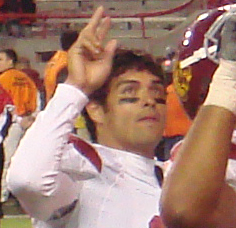
In his first game as starting quarterback, Mark Sanchez overcame first half inconsistencies with a strong second half performance.

The Trojans again showed inconsistency for most of the game before coming alive in the fourth quarter and pulling away to a 20–13 victory. USC started out well, going ahead 10–0 in the second quarter after running back Chauncey Washington's 18-yard touchdown run and David Buehler's 27-yard field goal. However, the offense began to sputter; the Trojans amassed only 12 total yards in the second quarter and 50 in the third. Part of the offense's problems were turnovers; Sanchez threw two interceptions in the second quarter, allowing Arizona to tie the game going into halftime. The Wildcats kicked another field goal early in the third quarter to go up 13–10, raising speculation that USC was going to be upset for the second consecutive week. The momentum of the game quickly changed in the fourth quarter after freshman running back Joe McKnight, touted as the next great Trojans tailback but yet to meet expectations, made a 45-yard punt return that Sanchez followed up on the next play with a 25-yard touchdown pass to tight end Fred Davis. After a defensive stop, Arizona punter Keenyn Crier kicked an 83-yard punt to the Trojans one-yard line. The Trojans pushed forward with fullback Stanley Havili before McKnight again made a big play, running 59 yards and setting up what would be a Trojans field goal. The USC defense then forced an Arizona turn-over on downs to preserve the victory. Sanchez recovered from his poor first half performance with a strong performance in the second, where he completed 11 of 15 passes for 74 yards and a touchdown while later making a key 10-yard scramble on third and seven late in the fourth quarter.

The injuries that had plagued USC throughout the season continued as All-American tackle Sam Baker left the game because of a hamstring strain and freshman guard Zack Heberer, already substituting for an injured Chilo Rachal, suffered a shoulder bruise. On the defense, linebacker Rey Maualuga suffered a hip injury and safety Kevin Ellison broke his nose. An uncommon number of injuries, especially along the offensive line, depleted reserve players and forced Trojans to reach out to the general student population in order to find students with previous lineman experience to help on the scout team's offensive line; however, none were officially added to the roster.

In light of the Trojans close victory, USC dropped in both major polls, falling to No. 13 in the AP Poll and No. 9 in the Coaches Poll, tied with previously No. 2 California, which had just lost an upset to Oregon State. The Trojans debuted at No. 14 in the season's first Bowl Championship Series standings, used to determine which two teams play in the BCS National Championship Game.

=== Notre Dame ===
Team	1	2	3	4	Total
• USC	7	10	14	7	38
Notre Dame	0	0	0	0	0

- Date: October 20
- Location: Notre Dame Stadium, South Bend, Indiana
- Game start: 3:30 pm EST

Scoring summary
1	3:40	USC	Fred Davis 10-yard pass from Mark Sanchez (David Buehler kick)	USC 7–0
2	3:55	USC	Allen Bradford 8-yard pass from Mark Sanchez (David Buehler kick)	USC 14–0
2	:11	USC	David Buehler 30-yard field goal	USC 17–0
3	12:56	USC	Stanley Havili 5-yard pass from Mark Sanchez (David Buehler kick)	USC 24–0
3	8:48	USC	Vidal Hazelton 48-yard pass from Mark Sanchez (David Buehler kick)	USC 31–0
4	10:57	USC	Joe McKnight 51-yard run (David Buehler kick)	USC 38–0

USC visited inter-sectional rival Notre Dame for their 79th annual game for possession of the Jeweled Shillelagh. Pre-season demand for tickets was among the highest in Notre Dame history as USC made its first visit back to Notre Dame Stadium since the notable 2005 "Bush Push" game; demand remained high although, going into the season, the Fighting Irish were unranked.

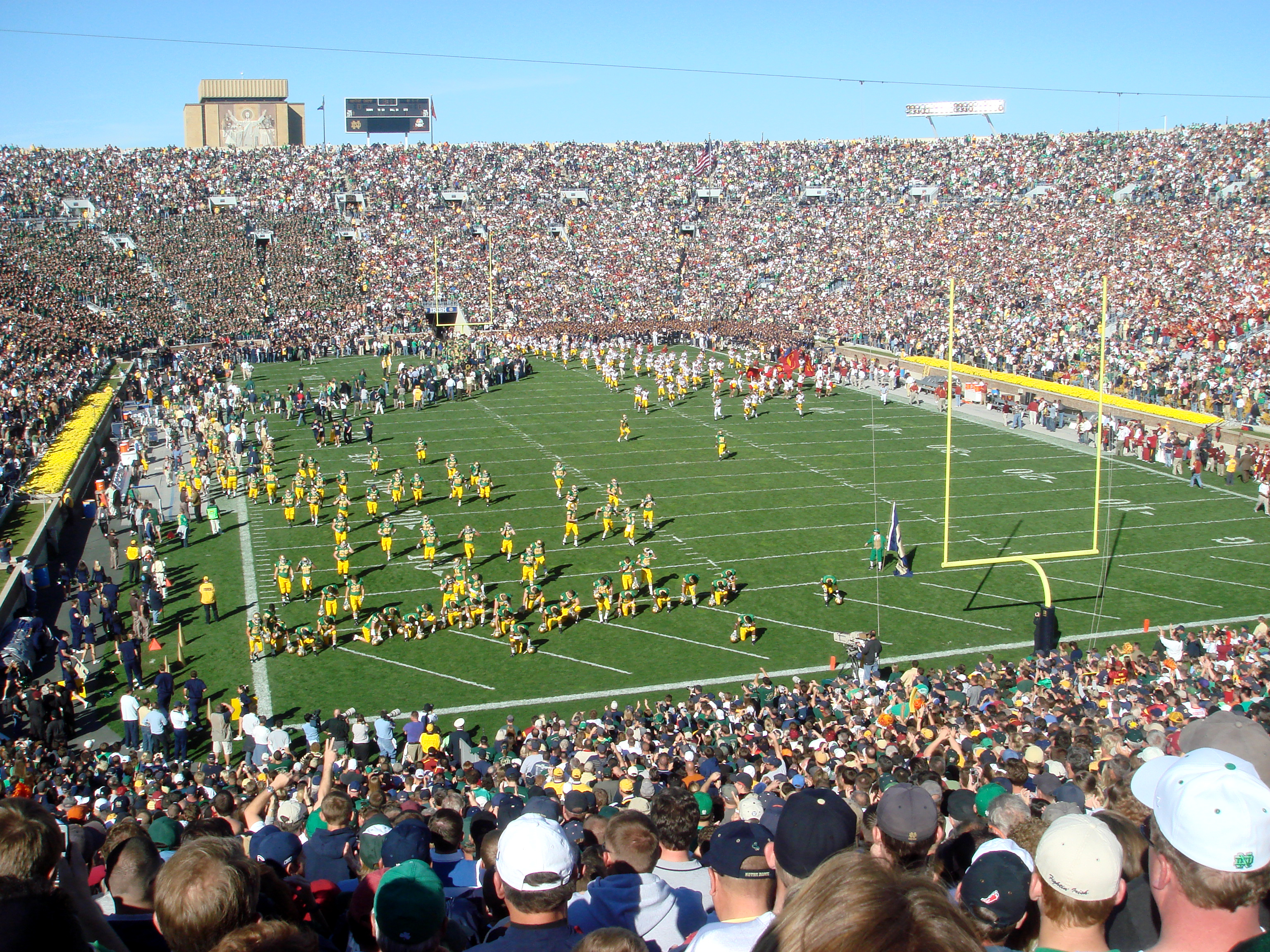
Notre Dame and USC take the field in the 79th edition of the rivalry.

Notre Dame had the worst start to their season in program history, opening 0–5 (the previous record was 0–3) and headed into their game with USC at 1–6. With significant problems at most positions, Notre Dame head coach Charlie Weis made several changes at quarterback: Starting the opener with sophomore Demetrius Jones, he chose to start heralded freshman Jimmy Clausen for games two through seven; during which time Jones transferred from the program. After Clausen also showed trouble at the position, Weis elected to go with junior Evan Sharpley as the starter for the USC game; Sharpley had backed up Brady Quinn the previous season. In response to controversy over the length of the grass in Notre Dame Stadium during the 2005 game, where USC kickoff returner Desmond Reed suffered torn right knee ligaments and nerve damage while trying to turn on the field, the Fighting Irish cut the grass significantly shorter. Notre Dame entered the game ranked last in total offense (190.9 yards a game) and rushing (32.1 yards a game), and next to last in scoring (11.4 points); their offensive line had given up 34 sacks.

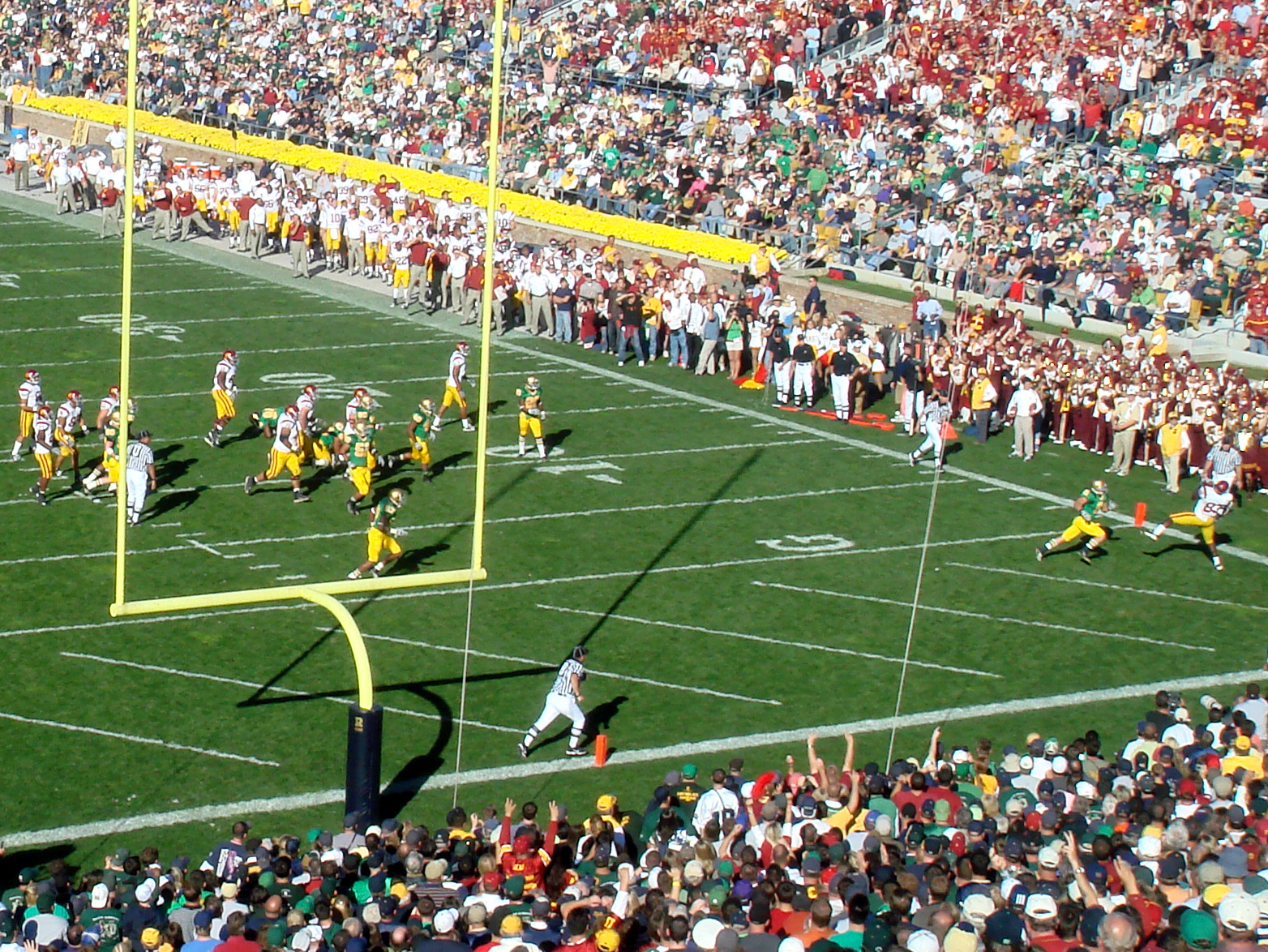
Fred Davis comes down with a one-handed touchdown against the Fighting Irish.

With starting quarterback John David Booty still recovering from a broken finger on his throwing hand, USC elected to start Mark Sanchez for the second straight week. On the Thursday night before the game, the Trojans charter flight experienced severe turbulence on approach to South Bend Regional Airport during a lightning storm; their aircraft dropped and threw several passengers (players, coaches and their spouses) from their seats and hit their heads on the ceiling during an initial approach that was aborted before the plane circled and landed safely.

Breaking with tradition, the Fighting Irish announced in June that they would be wearing their alternative green jerseys instead of blue against USC; Weis noted that it was in honor of the 1977 Irish team that switched to green jerseys before defeating the Trojans en route to a national championship (Weis was a student at Notre Dame at the time). Previously, the Irish did not let the public know when they would be wearing their green jerseys.

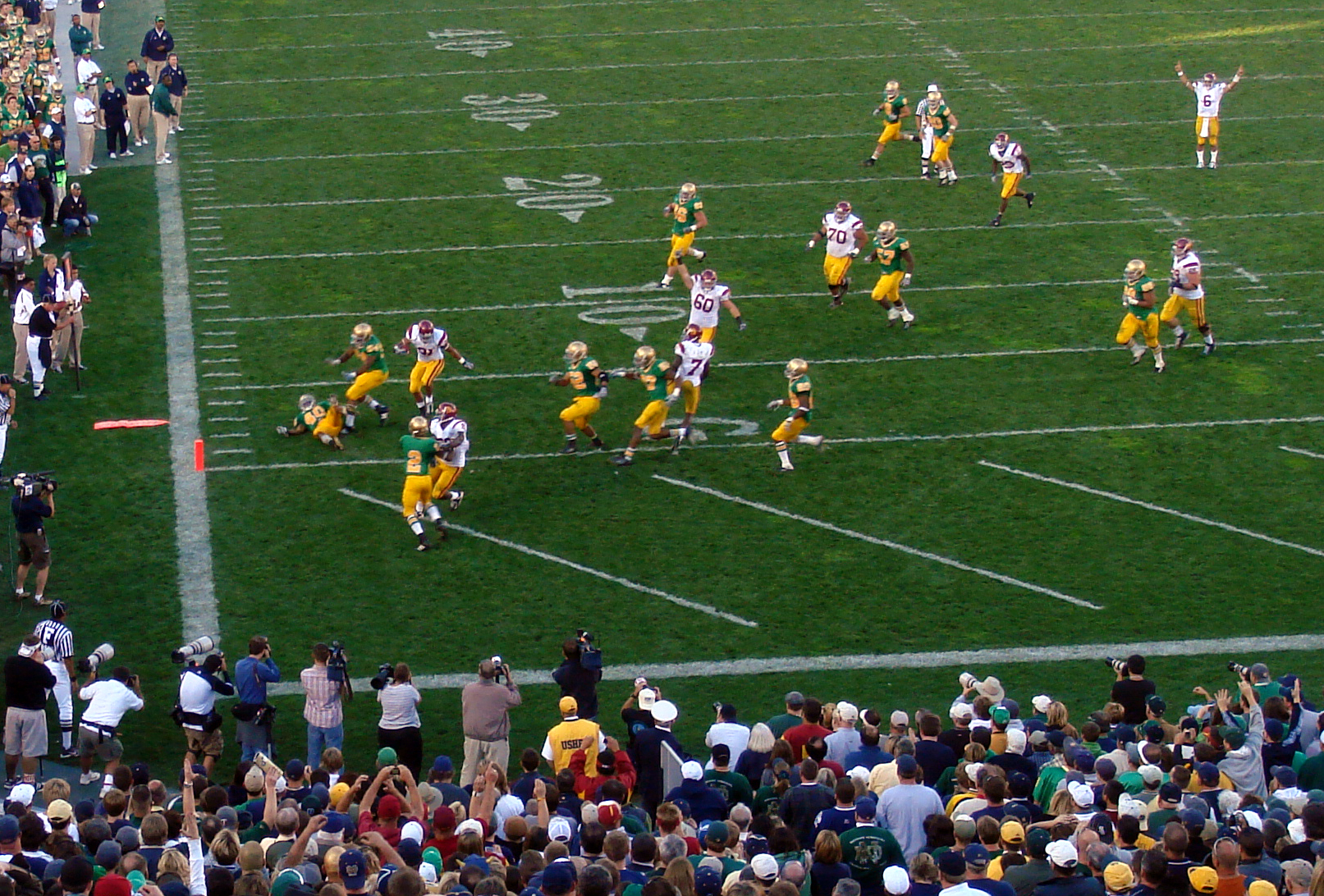
Fullback Stanley Havili hops into the endzone for a touchdown.

The Trojans dominated the game, shutting out Notre Dame 38–0, USC's largest margin of victory in the series. Quarterback Mark Sanchez made significant improvements over the previous week, completing 21 of 38 passes for 235 yards and four touchdowns and no interceptions. There were several highlight plays: Tight end Fred Davis made a one-handed touchdown catch in the first quarter, wide receiver Vidal Hazelton made a 48-yard touchdown run after evading several Irish defenders, and freshman running back Joe McKnight made a 51-yard fourth quarter run for his first touchdown. The USC defense stifled the Irish offense: allowing only 165 yards to the Trojans' 462 yards, making five sacks, and keeping the Irish from rushing for a first down until the fourth quarter. There were several special teams miscues: The Irish blocked a USC punt, the Trojans blocked a 40-yard field goal attempt and the Irish had a fumbled punt return that was recovered by USC. The Trojans had several key players return from injuries and make significant contributions, including linebacker Brian Cushing and running back Stafon Johnson.

After two weeks of moving down in the rankings, the Trojans moved up to No. 8 in the Coaches Poll, No. 9 in the AP Poll (tied with Florida) and No. 12 in the BCS standings.

=== Oregon ===
Team	1	2	3	4	Total
USC	0	3	7	7	17
• Oregon	7	3	7	7	24

- Date: October 27
- Location: Autzen Stadium, Eugene, Oregon

With the Ducks as three-point favorites, the Trojans entered a Pac-10 game as underdogs for the first time since November 17, 2001; the game was the first between top-10 teams in the 41-year history of Oregon's Autzen Stadium. The match-up was framed as a battle between Oregon's highly productive offense and USC's defense.

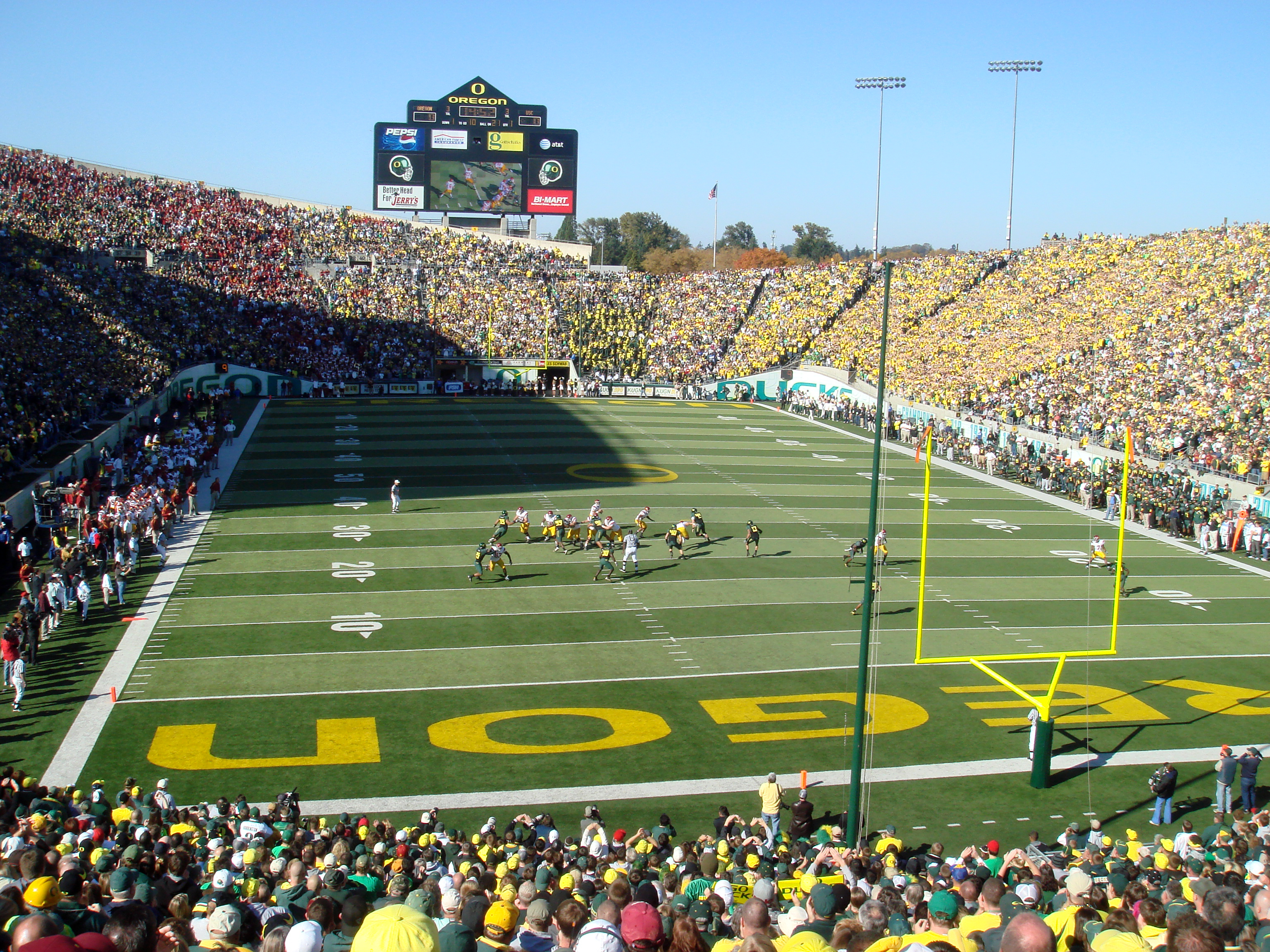
The Trojans begin their first drive after recovering the Ducks' fumble of the opening kickoff.

The Trojans were affected by the massive wildfires affecting Southern California that week; air quality during outdoor practices in Los Angeles dropped significantly, and Trojans quarterback Mark Sanchez' father, a fire captain with the Orange County Fire Authority, was on the front line fighting the blazes. With John David Booty still recovering from a broken finger, Sanchez was given the start for the third week in a row. The Trojans were also set to return from injury all-American offensive tackle Sam Baker and guard Chilo Rachal. Despite having won the previous three contests, the Trojans noted concerns about playing in the famously loud and raucous Autzen Stadium.

Before a stadium-record crowd of 59,277, the Ducks defeated the Trojans 24–17 in a game decided in the final seconds. The Trojans made key mistakes and did not exploit several opportunities against the Ducks. After Oregon fumbled the opening kickoff, USC failed to score with the Ducks stopping running back Joe McKnight on a fourth-and-one play at the Oregon 12 yard line. Later in the first quarter, an apparent 65-yard touchdown run by McKnight was nullified by a holding penalty away from the play.

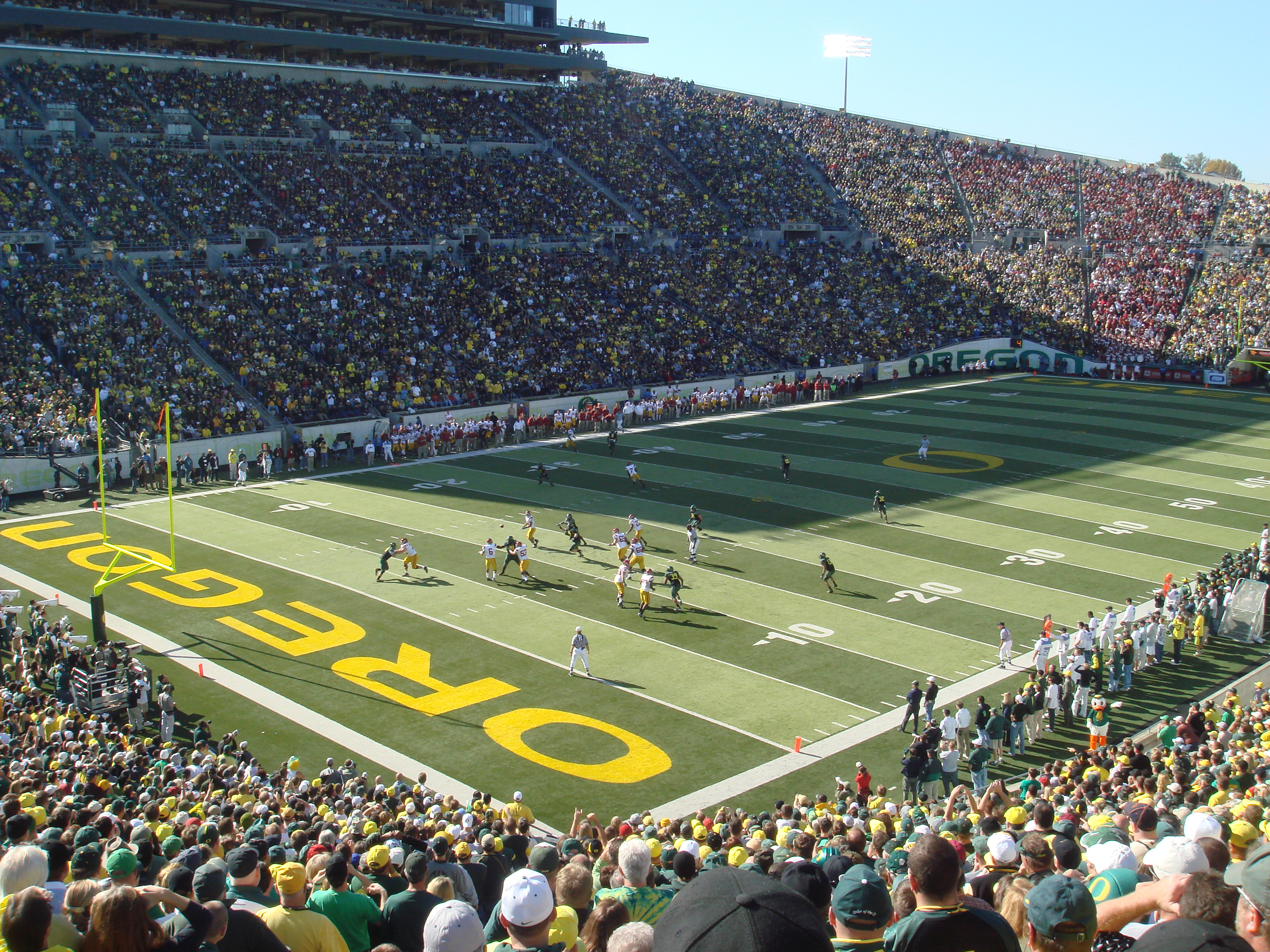
Sanchez throws a pass in the 2nd quarter.

The Trojans trailed 10–3 going into halftime, but tied the game in the third quarter on a Sanchez to Patrick Turner touchdown pass. However, on the next possession, fullback Stanley Havili fumbled the ball and Oregon recovered on the USC 16 yard line, leading to an Oregon touchdown. On USC's next series, Sanchez threw an interception. During the Trojans' following series, Oregon safety Matthew Harper intercepted a pass and returned it 27 yards to the Oregon 42. The Ducks took a 24–10 lead with 11:39 left as running back Jonathan Stewart scored his second touchdown. The Trojans rallied; Sanchez led an 85-yard, five-play drive that he capped with a 14-yard touchdown pass to wide receiver David Ausberry. The USC defense forced an Oregon three-and-out and starting at their 17; the Trojans then advanced to Oregon's 33 with 26 seconds left. However, on second down, Sanchez misread the defensive coverage and threw his second interception of the game to Harper with 11 seconds left in the game. After taking a knee to run out the clock on first down, USC used their final timeout to stop the clock. Unaware of the timeout, Oregon fans stormed the field before the game officially finished, and after being cleared away the Ducks took a second knee and ran out the clock, sealing the victory.

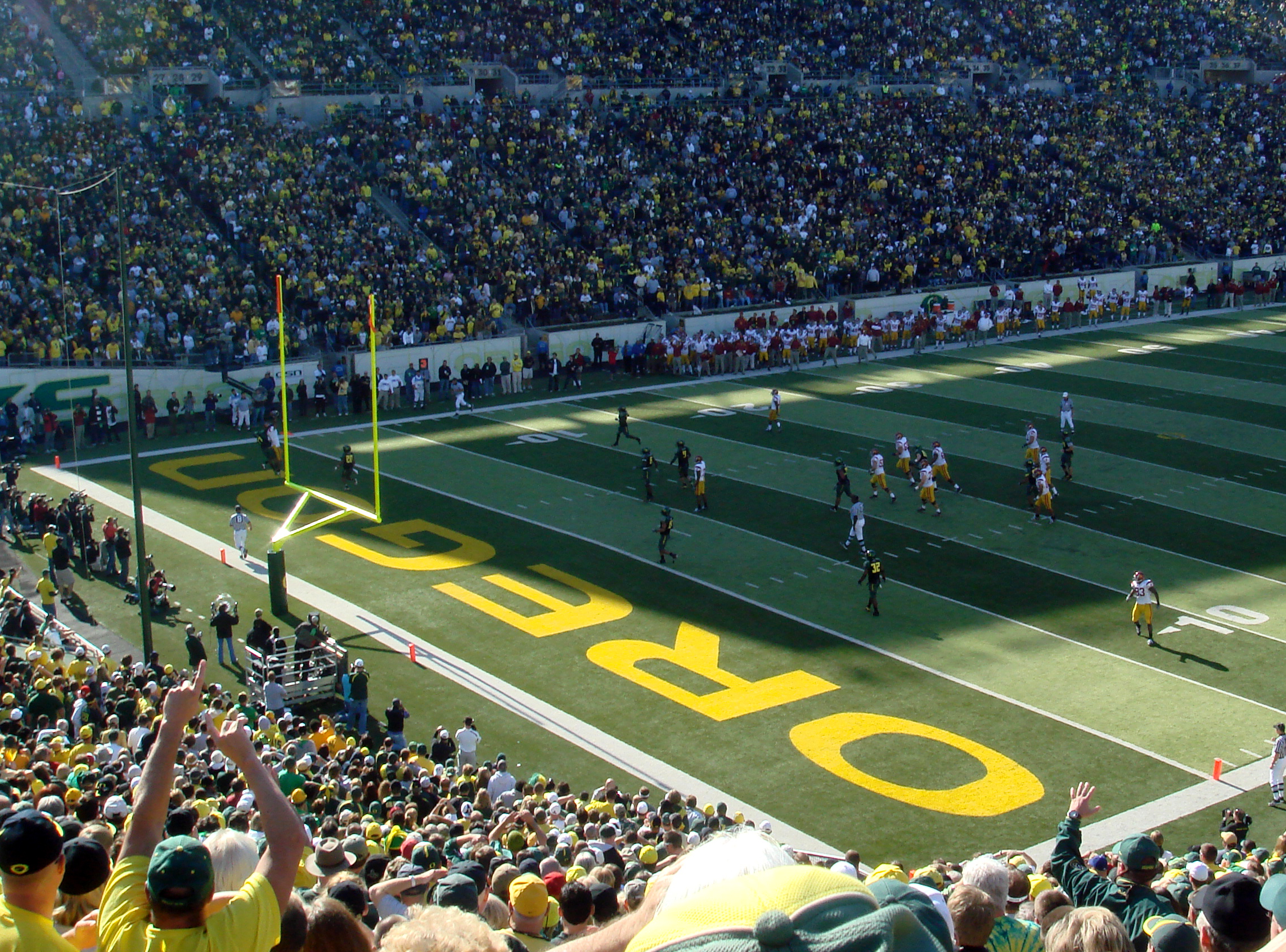
Patrick Turner comes down with a touchdown pass in the third quarter, tying the game.

The Trojans defense did slow down the Oregon offense, keeping them 212 yards below their season average, allowing the USC offense to out-gain the Ducks, 378 yards to 339. The Ducks' senior quarterback, Dennis Dixon, ran for 76 yards and a touchdown in 17 carries and completed 16 of 25 passes for 157 yards without an interception. However, the Oregon defense ultimately won the game for the Ducks. Sanchez threw for 277 yards and two touchdowns, but also had the two interceptions, including the game-ender. USC Offensive Coordinator Steve Sarkisian's decisions on several key plays were called into question by fans in the week following the game. Eugene's newspaper, The Register-Guard, recorded the crowd noise at 127.2 decibels, making it the loudest crowd for a college football game; 1.2 decibels louder than the 126 decibels made by 77,381 Clemson fans during a game in 2005.

The game was viewed as marking Oregon's rise to a national title contender and a break in USC's dominance of the Pac-10 conference. The game also marked the first season since 2002 that the Trojans were going into November no longer considered a national title contender. Despite losing the game, the Trojans were still regarded as a legitimate threat in the conference and were projected as a potential at-large team for the BCS bowl games. However, there were voices in the media that believed the loss signaled the "death" of the "Trojan Dynasty" that had reigned in college football since 2002.

The Trojans fell to No. 13 in the AP Poll, No. 15 in the Coaches Poll, and No. 19 in the BCS standings.

=== Oregon State ===
Team	1	2	3	4	Total
Oregon St	0	3	0	0	3
• USC	3	21	0	0	24

- Date: November 3
- Location: Los Angeles Memorial Coliseum, Los Angeles, California

USC celebrated homecoming by hosting the Oregon State Beavers, coached by Mike Riley. In 2006, the unranked Beavers stunned the No. 3 Trojans in a 33–31 upset in Corvallis. The Beavers had not won at USC since 1960.

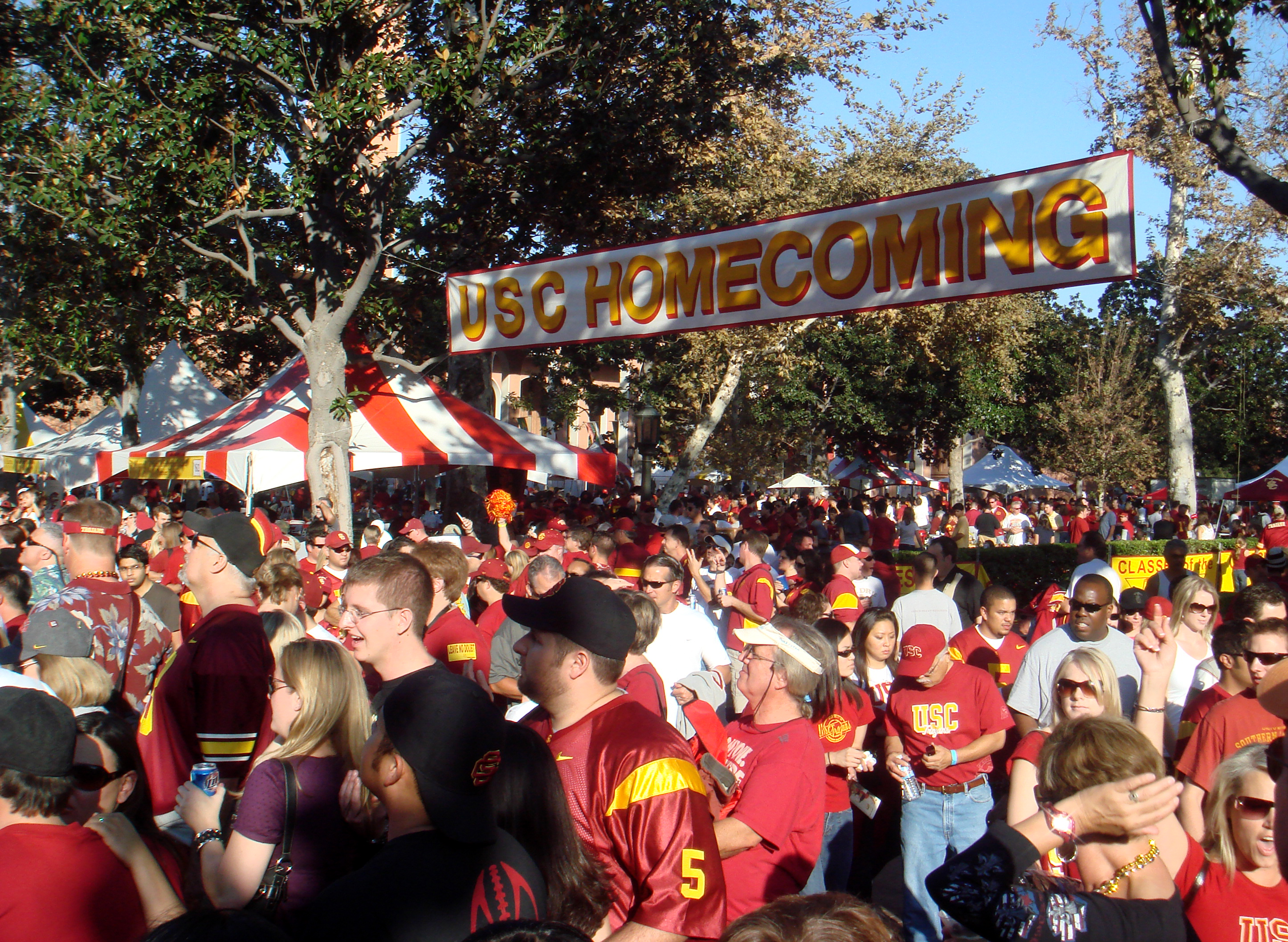
Homecoming crowds on the USC campus

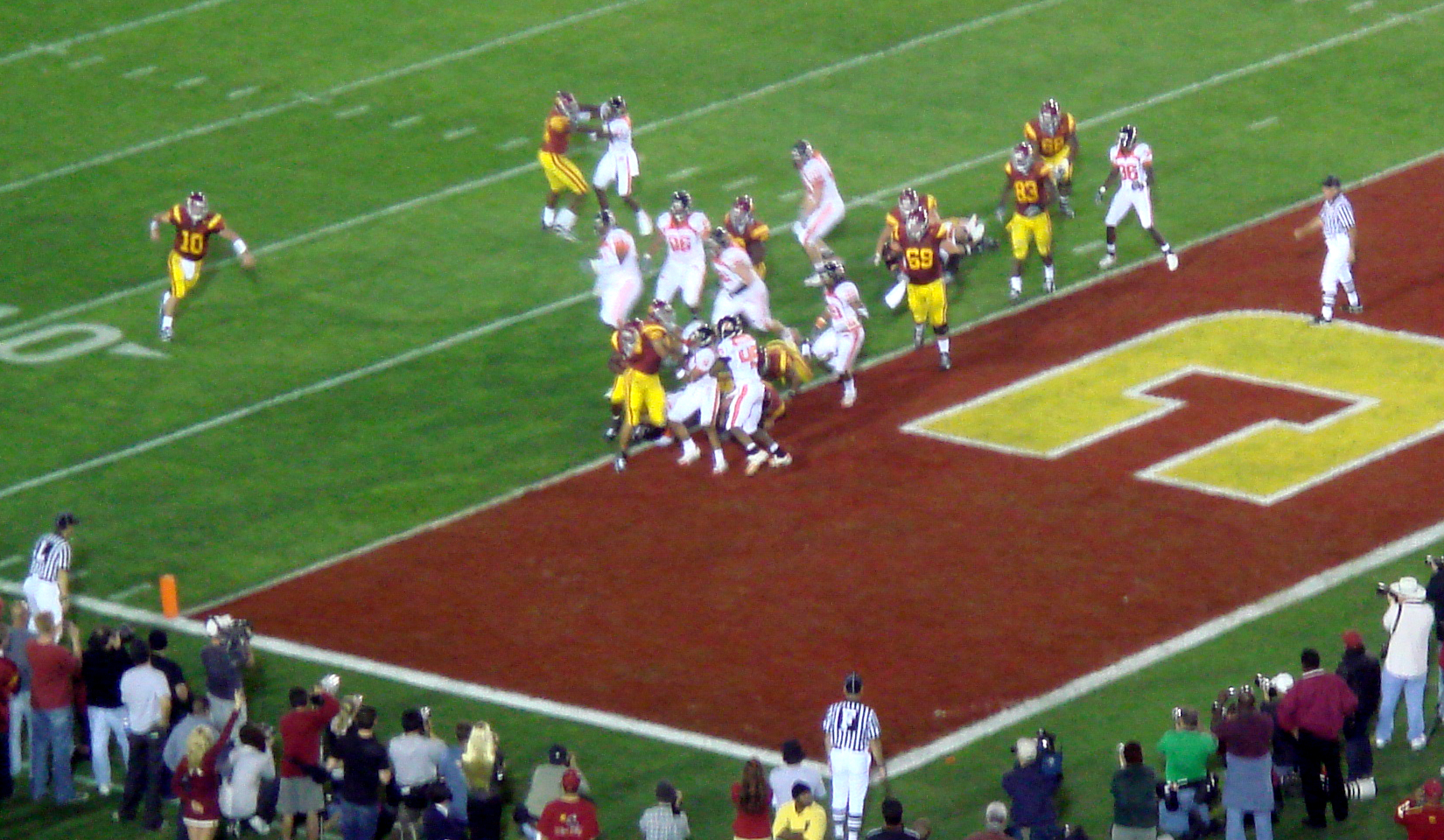
Chauncey Washington rushes for the first USC touchdown.

Oregon State entered the game with the nation's best rushing defense, allowing only 54.5 yards rushing a game and also recording a nation-leading 34 sacks. The Beaver defense ranked 13th nationally in total defense, surrendering 299.9 yards a game. Trojans quarterback John David Booty returned from injury to start; offensive lineman Sam Baker remained out after re-injuring a hamstring against the Ducks. Oregon State star running back Yvenson Bernard was initially expected to play despite a sprained shoulder, but did not. Former USC linebacker Richard Wood, who was chosen for the College Football Hall of Fame, was honored at halftime.

In a strong defensive performance, the Trojans defeated the Beavers 24–3. The USC defense made nine sacks and intercepted a pass; they limited Oregon State to 176 total yards and a field goal off a Trojans fumble in the USC red zone. True freshman Everson Griffen had 3 1/2 sacks, safety Kevin Ellison added two, end Lawrence Jackson had 1 1/2 and nose tackle Sedrick Ellis and linebacker Brian Cushing had one each; cornerback Terrell Thomas made the interception. The Trojans offense had its second lowest total of the season, gaining 287 yards, but it rushed for 100 yards against the Beavers' tight rush defense, led by Chauncey Washington who gained 60 yards in 12 carries. Booty, returning from injury, could not find his rhythm but still completed 19 of 33 passes for 157 yards without an interception; the Trojans converted only five of 16 third downs. Both teams missed field goals in the first quarter, then exchanged field goals going into the second quarter. The Trojans then scored 21 unanswered points in less than eight minutes to close the half. Neither team scored in the second half. USC running back Stafon Johnson was allowed to play a few downs but was kept out for most of the game to allow his foot to heal fully.

The Trojans rose slightly in the polls to No. 12 in the AP Poll, No. 15 in the Coaches Poll, and No. 17 in the BCS standings. The 2007 Holiday Bowl was mentioned as a possible destination for the Trojans. Holiday Bowl executive director Bruce Binkowski said they would be very interested in pitting the Trojans against the Texas Longhorns. The two teams last met in the 2006 Rose Bowl for the BCS National Championship.

=== California ===
Team	1	2	3	4	Total
• USC	7	7	3	7	24
California	7	3	7	0	17

- Date: November 10
- Location: California Memorial Stadium, Berkeley, California

In the pre-season, the Trojans' game against California was named as one of the candidates for the 10 most important games of 2007; the Trojans national title hopes hinged on proving themselves against a veteran team led by head coach Jeff Tedford in California Memorial Stadium. Prior to the season, Cal star receiver DeSean Jackson, an early Heisman Trophy candidate, called out USC cornerback Terrell Thomas in ESPN The Magazine, stating that he would best the cornerback who contributed to limiting him to two catches in the 2006 match-up. After USC's loss to Stanford, the game was still referred to as the Pac-10 game of the year; however, after Cal's mid-season losses to Oregon State and UCLA and USC's loss to Oregon, the game took on less importance.

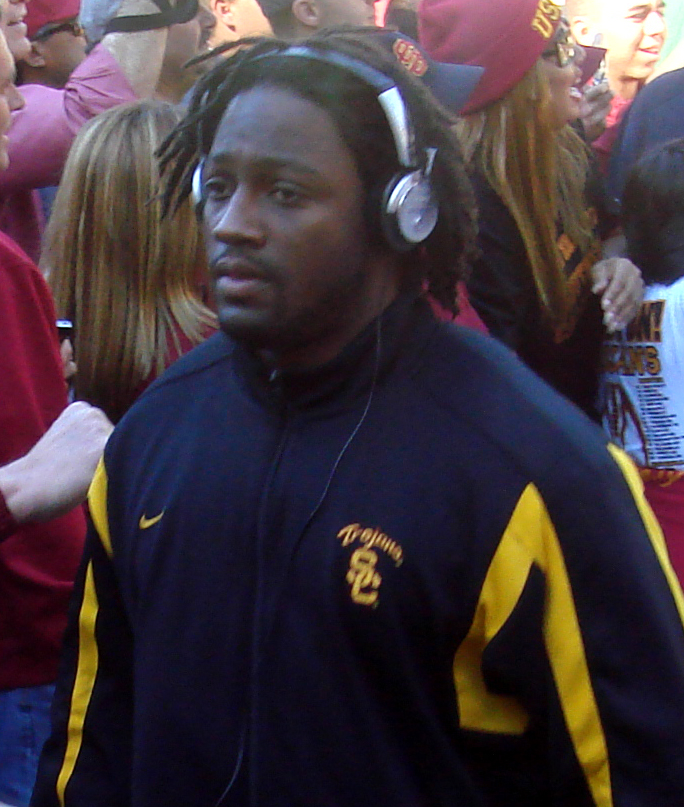
Running back Chauncey Washington had a career-best effort, rushing for 220 yards.

On a rain-soaked evening in Strawberry Canyon, the Trojans gained a 24–17 victory over the No. 24 Golden Bears behind a career-best effort by running back Chauncey Washington. After seeing his early success against the Cal defense, USC began handing the ball almost exclusively to Washington who ran for 220 yards on 29 rushes. Due to the rain and Washington's success on the ground, Booty only attempted 20 passes for 129 yards in 11 completions with one touchdown and no interceptions; the Trojans offensive line did not give up a sack. USC returner Ronald Johnson returned four kicks for 102 yards, including one for 41 yards and another for 35, giving USC favorable field position. Cal running back Justin Forsett had an effective night, running for 164 yards in 31 carries. However, the Trojans defense had another solid effort, holding Cal to 14 points below its scoring average and forcing quarterback Nate Longshore into two interceptions and a sack. Cal's one-time Heisman Trophy candidate, wide receiver DeSean Jackson, was limited to five receptions for 64 yards and was kept from returning any kicks.

The game turned to the Trojans favor during the fourth quarter, when the Trojans put together a 10 play, 96-yard drive behind Washington and capped by a three-yard touchdown run by Stafon Johnson. Cal received the ball back with 7:38 left, but the Trojans forced turnovers in the Bears' subsequent two drives; after Lawrence Jackson recovered a fumbled snap on the first drive, cornerback Terrell Thomas intercepted a Longshore pass at the USC 17 with 2:47 to play to seal the victory. As part of its Hall of Fame weekend, Cal wore throwback jerseys based on its 1975 team in honor of All-American quarterback Joe Roth; it was the third team to wear throwback jerseys in their game against the Trojans. Linebacker Keith Rivers suffered a high ankle sprain.

After the victory and the subsequent bye week, the Trojans again rose slightly in the polls to No. 11 in the AP Poll, No. 11 in the BCS standings, and No. 12 in the Coaches Poll.

=== Arizona State ===
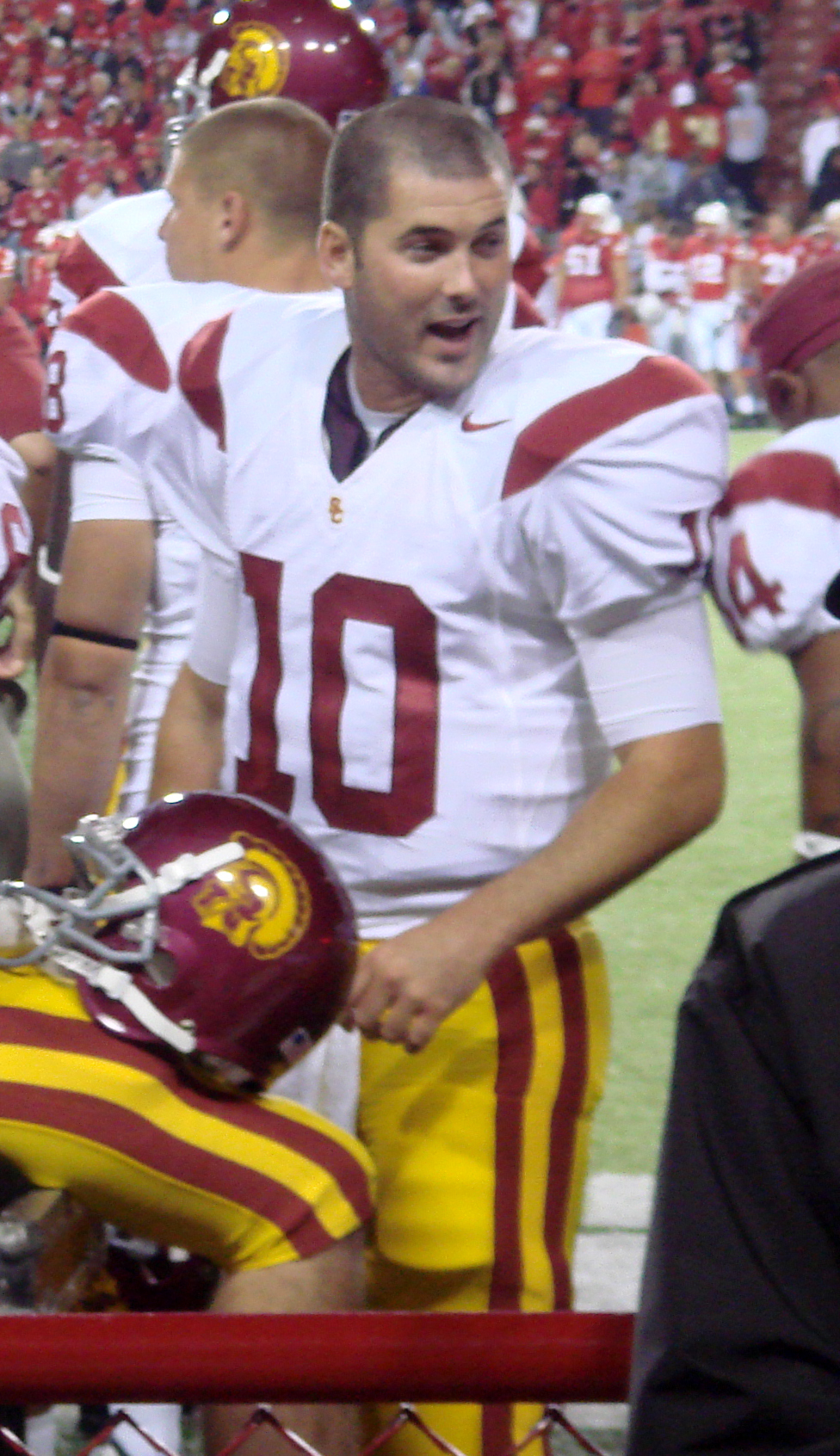
Quarterback John David Booty threw for 375 yards and four touchdowns.

Team	1	2	3	4	Total
• USC	17	10	17	0	44
Arizona St	14	3	0	7	24

- Date: November 22
- Location: Sun Devil Stadium, Tempe, Arizona

In the pre-season, the game against veteran head coach Dennis Erickson's first squad at ASU was identified as a potential trap game for the Trojans. With No. 2 Oregon's loss during the bye week, Arizona State rose to No. 9 in the polls and the top of the Pac-10 standings while USC remained in contention for at least a share of the Pac-10 title if they could win out.

Scheduled for prime time television on Thanksgiving Day, it was the only major college game shown on the holiday evening time slot. It was Arizona State's first Thanksgiving Day game and USC's 20th, though its first since 1938. The game attracted a number of celebrities, including former USC Heisman-winners Marcus Allen and Matt Leinart, who was joined by Arizona Cardinals teammate Larry Fitzgerald, Heisman-winner Gino Torretta, Bob Davie and Charles Barkley; it also included a halftime performance by singer Little Richard. In honor of the holiday, the Sun Devils added a turkey leg to the end of Sparty's pitchfork painted at the center of the field.

Eleven years removed from their last Rose Bowl berth, Arizona State had made a quick turn-around under Erickson, returning to national prominence with a 9–1 record. Using an NFL-style offense under junior quarterback Rudy Carpenter, the Sun Devils put extra pressure on their offensive line, allowing in 43 sacks, the most in the Pac-10 Conference and second most in the nation. In order to relieve Carpenter, who had suffered injuries over the season in his throwing hand, Arizona State planned to also work in the running game behind Keegan Herring and Dimitri Nance. USC entered the game ranked first in the Pac-10 and third nationally in defense, giving up 267.9 yards per game. The Sun Devils had trailed in every Pac-10 conference game in the season up to that point.

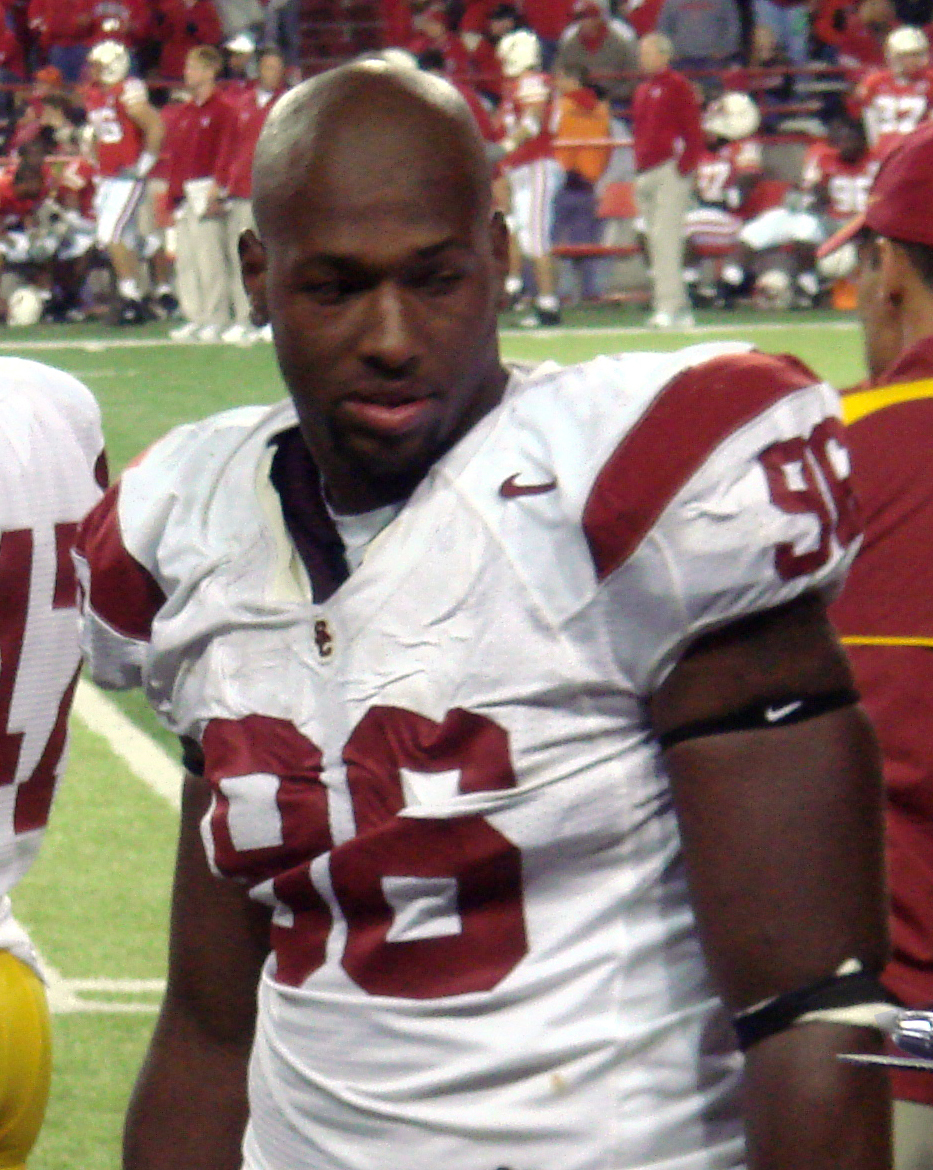
Defensive end Lawrence Jackson had four sacks.

Behind a strong performance by John David Booty, the Trojans defeated the Sun Devils, 44–24, in front of a sold-out Sun Devil Stadium. Under an even passing attack, Booty threw for 26 of 39 passes for 375 yards and four touchdowns with no interceptions. He distributed the ball to eight different receivers, including four separate players for his touchdowns; Booty also rushed for a touchdown. Tight end Fred Davis made five receptions for 119 yards and a touchdown. David Buehler kicked three field goals. The Trojans defense made six sacks as the Sun Devils were shut down for most of the second half and held to 16 yards rushing; two of the Sun Devils' scores were from a 98-yard kick return for a touchdown and a score off a blocked punt in the fourth quarter. Defensive end Lawrence Jackson made four of USC's sacks, the most by a USC player since 1989, including one that split Carpenter's lip and caused him to throw his helmet towards the sideline in frustration; Jackson also finished with a school-record 5 1/2 tackles for losses. Ronald Johnson had another strong game on special teams, returning the opening kickoff 49 yards.

Two days later Oregon lost to UCLA, leaving the Trojans in a tie for first place in the Pac-10 standings with Arizona State (winning the tiebreaker). USC's strong victory, along with several upsets during the week, led the Trojans to rise to No. 8 in the AP Poll, No. 8 in the BCS standings, and No. 9 in the Coaches Poll.

=== UCLA ===
Team	1	2	3	4	Total
UCLA	0	7	0	0	7
• USC	7	10	0	7	24

- Date: December 1
- Location: Los Angeles Memorial Coliseum, Los Angeles, California

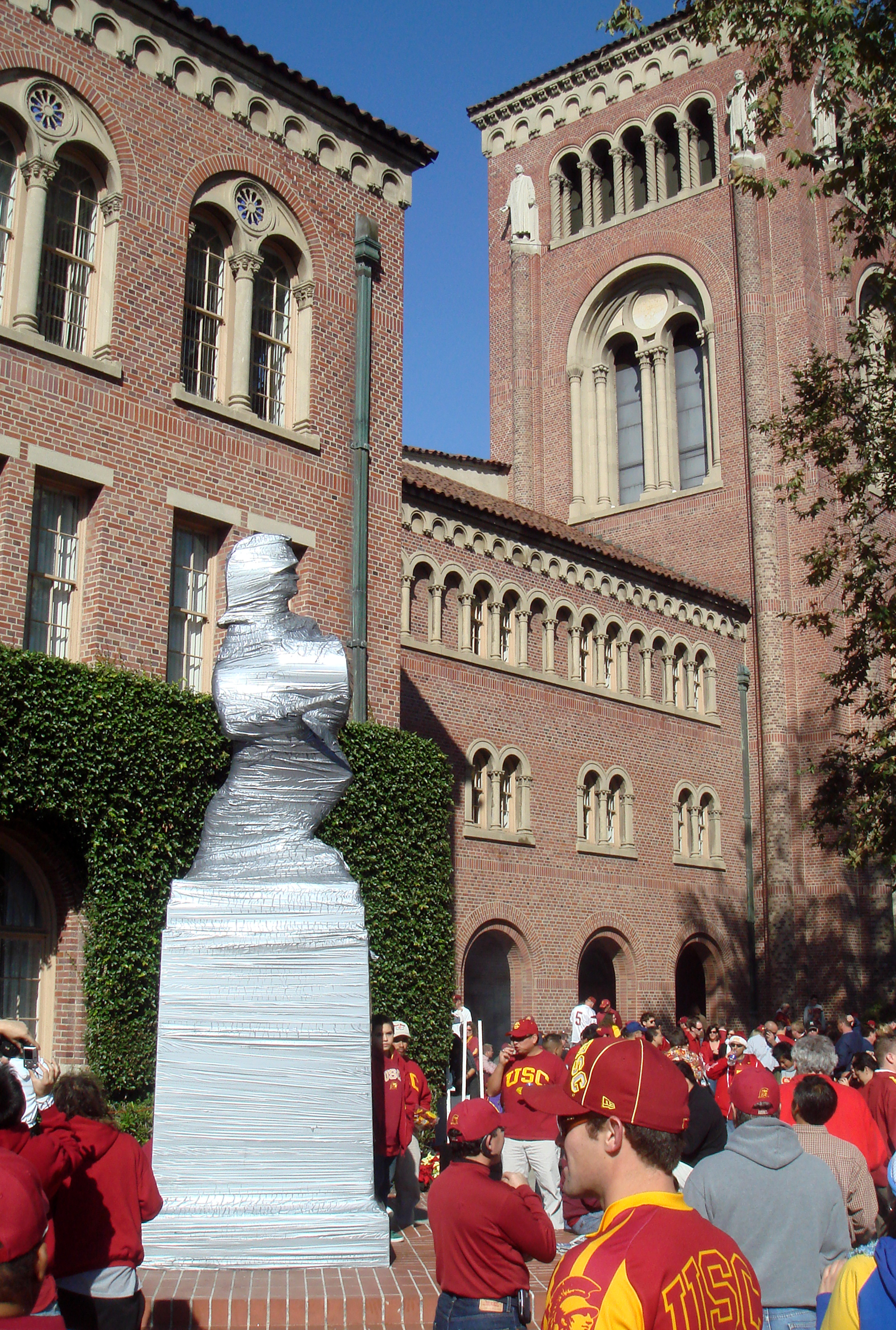
USC campus symbol "Tommy Trojan" is wrapped in duct tape during the week preceding the game to protect it from vandalism.

The Trojans ended the regular season by hosting the UCLA Bruins, led by head coach Karl Dorrell, in the 77th edition of their annual crosstown rivalry game for possession of the Victory Bell. In the 2006 season, the Bruins' 13–9 upset of the then-No. 2 Trojans in the final week of the regular season ended the Trojans' hopes for reaching the national championship game. With both teams ranked going into the season (USC first, UCLA 14th in the AP Poll), there was buzz in Los Angeles that both teams might reach their December 1 game undefeated. UCLA made it as high as 11th in both polls before suffering a 44–7 upset loss at unranked Utah in week 3 that knocked them out of the top 25. It was the 36th time that a Rose Bowl berth was on the line for one of the two teams in the game: A USC victory would guarantee them at least a share of the Pac-10 Conference title and a berth in the 2008 Rose Bowl Game; UCLA, despite entering the game 6–5 (5–3 in the Pac-10), also entered the game with a chance at the Pac-10 title and a Rose Bowl berth if they could defeat the Trojans and Arizona could beat Arizona State in a game later in the day.

During the 2006 contest, UCLA Defensive Coordinator DeWayne Walker had the Bruins apply aggressive pressure to John David Booty, limiting the quarterback's ability to drive the passing game while holding the Trojans to 55 yards rushing and an average of only 1.9 yards per carry. USC entered the 2007 game averaging 186.6 yards rushing and 4.8 yards per carry, significantly higher than the 128 yards rushing per game in 2006. UCLA's season was marked by numerous injures, particularly at quarterback. Original starting quarterback Ben Olson injured his knee early in the season and missed over four games. Backup quarterback Patrick Cowan also suffered a knee injury but returned for two more games before suffering a collapsed lung against Arizona. As a result, the Bruins had resorted to playing walk-on McLeod Bethel-Thompson and converted-wide receiver Osaar Rasshan.

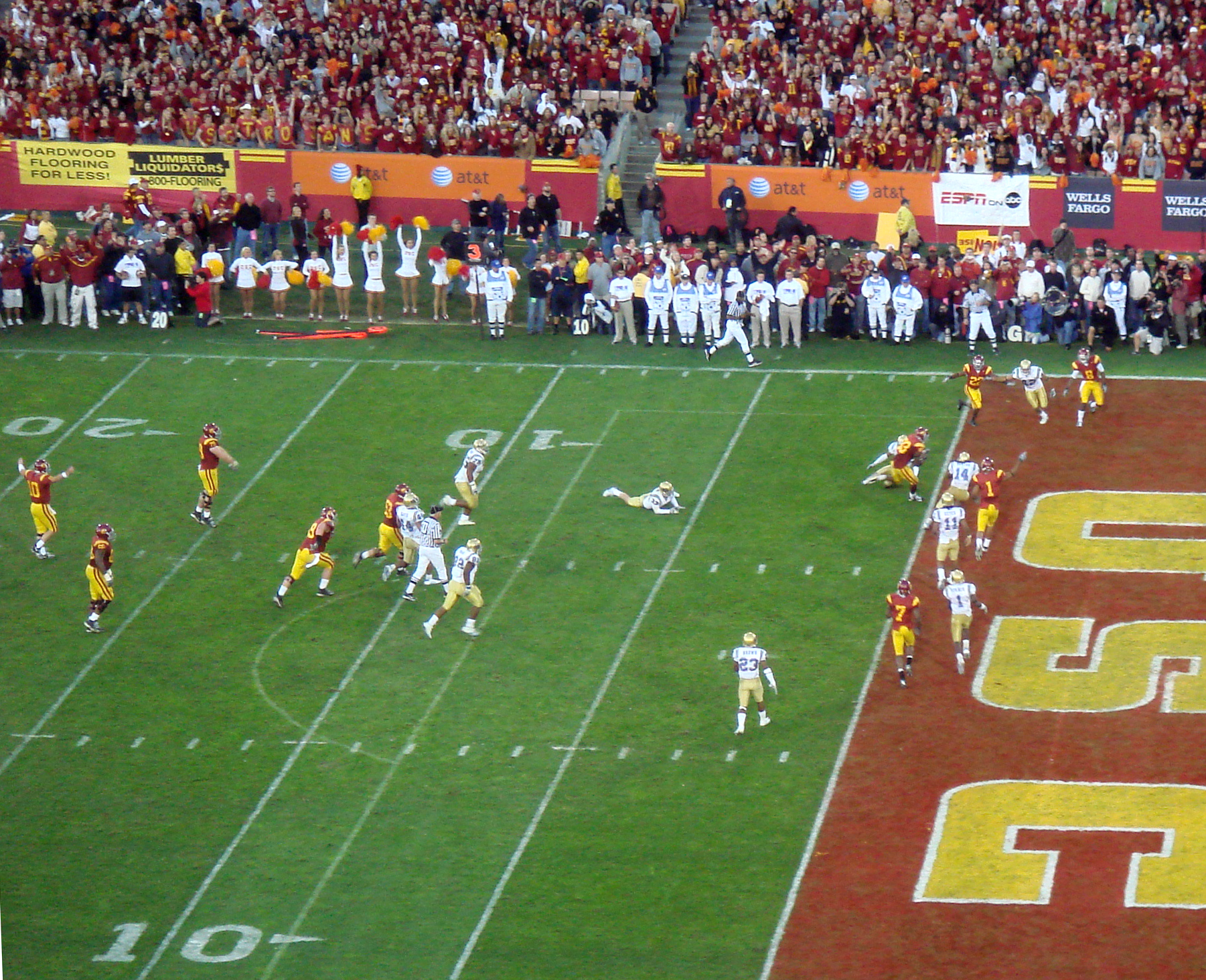
Fred Davis (#83) takes a pass into the end zone.

In the week leading up to the game, a dispute between USC and the Coliseum Commission, the public managers of the Los Angeles Memorial Coliseum, went public. USC threatened to move to the Rose Bowl (home of the UCLA Bruins since 1982) if an agreement could not be reached. In addition to honoring the outgoing seniors during their final game in the Coliseum, the Trojans also honored late players Drean Rucker and Mario Danelo, who would have both been members of the 2007 senior class. Rucker, a linebacker from Moreno Valley, drowned during the summer before his freshman year with USC (and was honored during the 2004 season) and Danelo died from a fatal fall immediately following the 2006 season; members of both families attended. The stadium also held a moment of silence for the passing of Trojans alumnus and donor Louis Galen. USC entered the game as a 20-point favorite.

The Trojans defense dominated the Bruins in a 24–7 victory before a sold-out Coliseum crowd. The Trojans held the Bruins to a season-low 168 yards, sacking quarterback Patrick Cowan four times for 31 yards in losses and held the Bruins to 12 net rushing yards. USC forced four turnovers, recovering three UCLA fumbles and intercepting a pass. The Bruins did not convert any of its 11 third down situations. The Bruins sole score came in a drive in the closing minutes of the first half. USC gained 231 rushing yards and 437 overall. On the ground, running back Joe McKnight rushed for 89 yards and a touchdown, Stafon Johnson ran for 73 yards and senior Chauncey Washington gained 66 yards and scored a touchdown. Booty completed 21 of 36 passes for 206 yards with a touchdown and an interception.

The victory assured USC a share of the Pac-10 title. Although Arizona State would defeat Arizona later in the night to become co-champions, the Trojans clinched a berth in the Rose Bowl by virtue of their victory over the Sun Devils the previous week. USC extended its streak of Pac-10 titles to six in a row, having already broken the record the previous season with five. Dorrell was fired by UCLA the following Monday. USC's victory, coupled with another week of upsets, led the Trojans to rise to No. 6 in the AP Poll, No. 6 in the Coaches Poll, and No. 7 in the BCS standings.

=== Rose Bowl ===
Team	1	2	3	4	Total
Illinois	0	3	7	7	17
• USC	14	7	14	14	49

- Date: Tuesday, January 1
- Location: Rose Bowl, Pasadena, California

Scoring summary
1	10:57	USC	Chauncey Washington 8-yard pass from John David Booty (David Buehler kick)	USC 7-0
1	8:30	USC	Desmond Reed 34-yard pass from Garrett Green (David Buehler kick)	USC 14-0
2	2:21	USC	Chauncey Washington 3-yard run (David Buehler kick)	USC 21-0
2	:38	Illinois	Jason Reda 28-yard field goal	USC 21-3
3	12:33	Illinois	Rashard Mendenhall 79-yard run (Jason Reda kick)	USC 21-10
3	5:18	USC	Fred Davis 2-yard pass from John David Booty (David Buehler kick)	USC 28-10
3	3:42	USC	Joe McKnight 6-yard run (David Buehler kick)	USC 35-10
4	14:10	USC	David Ausberry 15-yard pass from John David Booty (David Buehler kick)	USC 42-10
4	5:47	USC	Hershel Dennis 3-yard run (David Buehler kick)	USC 49-10
4	4:28	Illinois	Arrelious Benn 56-yard pass from Eddie McGee (Jason Reda kick)	USC 49-17

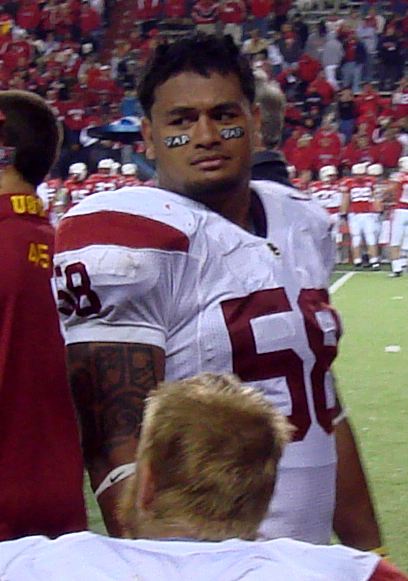
Linebacker Rey Maualuga was chosen as the defensive MVP of the Rose Bowl.

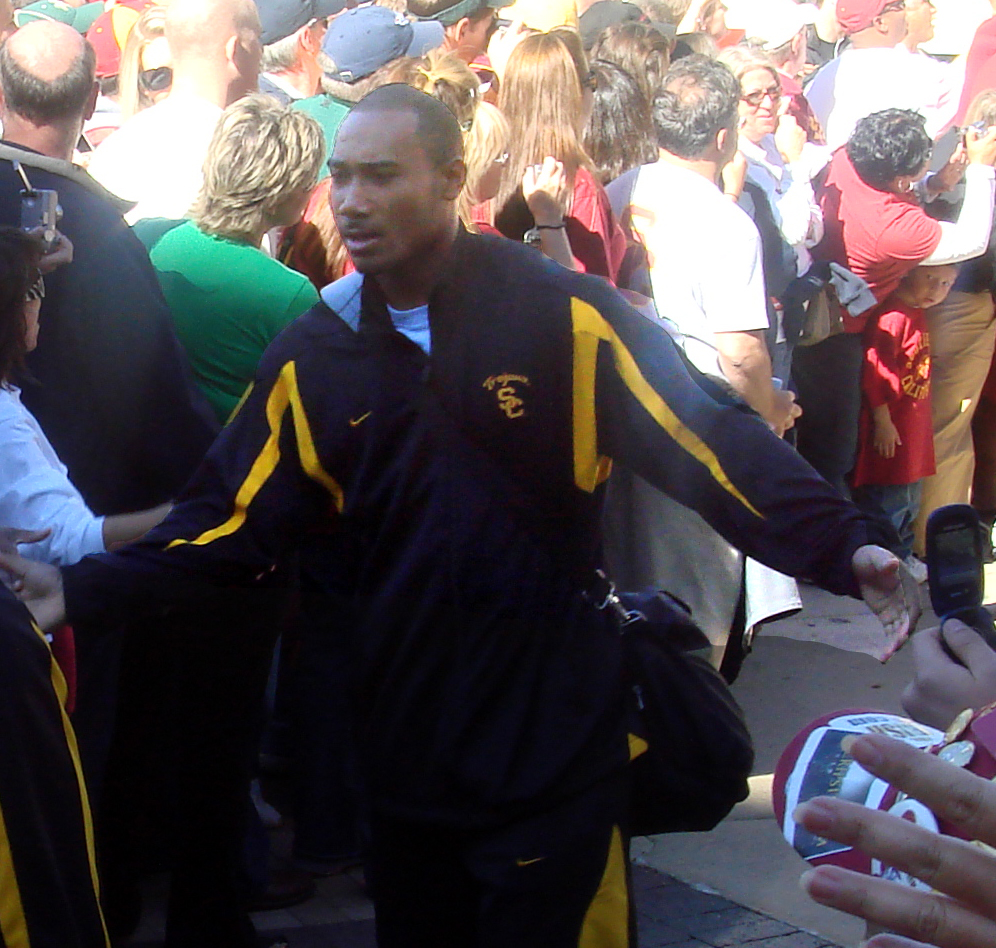
Sixth-year running back Hershel Dennis scored his first touchdown since 2004, leading teammates to rush the goal in celebration.

The Trojans ended the 2007 season by participating in the 2008 Rose Bowl, held on New Year's Day in the Rose Bowl stadium in Pasadena, California; it was the Trojans' fourth Rose Bowl game and sixth BCS Bowl in six years. Although it traditionally hosts the champions of the Big Ten and Pac-10 conferences, the 2007 Big Ten Champion, Ohio State, was ranked No. 1 in the final BCS poll and instead participated in the 2008 BCS National Championship Game. The rules governing BCS bowl selections allowed the Rose Bowl to select a BCS "at-large" team from the top 14 teams ranked in the BCS Standings that have at least nine wins. Keeping with its traditional bowl ties, the Rose Bowl selected the No. 13-ranked Illinois Fighting Illini (9–3), under third-year head coach Ron Zook.

The Illini entered the Rose Bowl after a Cinderella season where they won nine games, including an upset victory over at-the-time No. 1 Ohio State, after winning a total of four games the previous two seasons. It was Illinois' first bowl game since winning the 2001 Big Ten Championship and playing in the 2002 Sugar Bowl. The Illini offense was led by sophomore quarterback "Juice" Williams, who in the regular season passed for 13 touchdowns and ran for seven, junior running back Rashard Mendenhall, who averaged 127 yards rushing per game and scored 18 touchdowns, and freshman receiver Arrelious Benn, who caught 49 passes and had 158 yards in 32 carries. For taking Illinois to the Rose Bowl a year after going 2–10, Zook won both national and Big Ten coach of the year honors. The Illini entered the game 13.5 point underdogs, the biggest of any of the season's 32 bowl games. It was USC's 31st appearance in "The Granddaddy of Them All", having won in 22 of its previous appearances and leading in both categories by a significant margin.

The Trojans routed the Illini 49–17 before a sold-out Rose Bowl crowd. USC set a Rose Bowl-record of 633 offensive yards and tied the record for points scored. John David Booty completed 25 of 37 passes for 255 yards, three touchdowns and one interception. Seven different Trojans rushed the ball, led by running back Joe McKnight who had 125 rushing yards and touchdown (McKnight totaled 206 yards for the game). Tight end Fred Davis led the receivers with seven receptions for 87 yards and a touchdown. Mendenhall led the Illini, rushing 17 times for 155 yards and one touchdown, with 214 yards overall. Williams had 245 yards passing, completing 21 of 35 passes with two interceptions and was sacked five times. The second Trojans touchdown was a trick play thrown by walk-on receiver-quarterback Garrett Green, who caught a ball thrown backward by Booty and then threw a 34-yard touchdown pass to running back Desmond Reed, who backflipped into the endzone, resulting in an excessive celebration penalty. The fourth quarter included a touchdown by sixth-year senior and one-time starter Hershel Dennis, his first score since 2004, leading to a bench-clearing celebration that resulted in USC receiving another excessive celebration penalty.

USC's 32-point victory was the largest margin of victory in the Rose Bowl since 1984, when UCLA defeated Illinois 45–9. The lopsided score amplified existing criticism of the Tournament of Roses for scheduling the lower-ranked Fighting Illini as the at-large team. Booty was selected as the Rose Bowl Offensive MVP, and set a Rose Bowl record with seven career touchdowns. USC linebacker Rey Maualuga was selected as the Defensive MVP with three sacks, an interception and a forced fumble. It was USC's fifth victory in six consecutive appearances in a BCS Bowl.

USC ended the season as No. 2 in the final Coaches' Poll and No. 3 in the final AP Poll with one first-place vote.

== After the season ==
=== Comments ===
The 2007 USC Trojans entered the season picked as the unanimous No. 1 team, with expectations of playing in the BCS National Title Game. After the loss to 41-point underdog Stanford the team's opportunities for national success came into serious question, and following the loss to Oregon there were questions as to whether USC would even win the Pacific-10 Conference. The Trojans regrouped and salvaged their season, winning a share of the conference and the Rose Bowl, and by the end of the season were said to be playing the best football of anyone in the country. Injuries to key players, particularly quarterback John David Booty's broken finger during the Stanford game, had a significant impact over the season, leading to questions of how USC would have fared if injuries had not taken their toll.

USC finished the season ranked No. 2 in the Coaches Poll and No. 3 in the AP Poll, trading the respective No. 3 and No. 2 spots with Georgia, another team that finished with a strong 11–2 record and a dominating performance in its BCS Bowl game. The teams finished close to each other in the final polls: In the Coaches Poll, USC received 1380 votes to Georgia's 1370; and in the AP Poll Georgia received 1515 to USC's 1500. USC received one first-place vote in the final AP Poll. With LSU's dominating win over Ohio State in the BCS National Championship Game, college football had its first two-loss national champion, and with teams like USC and Georgia locked out of playing LSU or Ohio State, the season served as another example for those advocating for some form of Football Bowl Subdivision playoff.

The Trojans accomplished two feats: USC became the first team to win six straight Pac-10 titles and became the first team in major college football to achieve six straight 11-win seasons. In addition, USC set a record by playing in a BCS Bowl for the sixth consecutive season.

Immediately after the 2007–08 bowl season, in early looks at the 2008 season, USC was ranked as the pre-season No. 4 (Sports Illustrated) and No. 5 (ESPN.com) due to key player departures mitigated by the overall talent level. Sports Illustrated soon revised its ranking to No. 3 after nearly all draft-eligible juniors decided to remain with the program instead of entering the NFL draft.

=== NFL draft ===
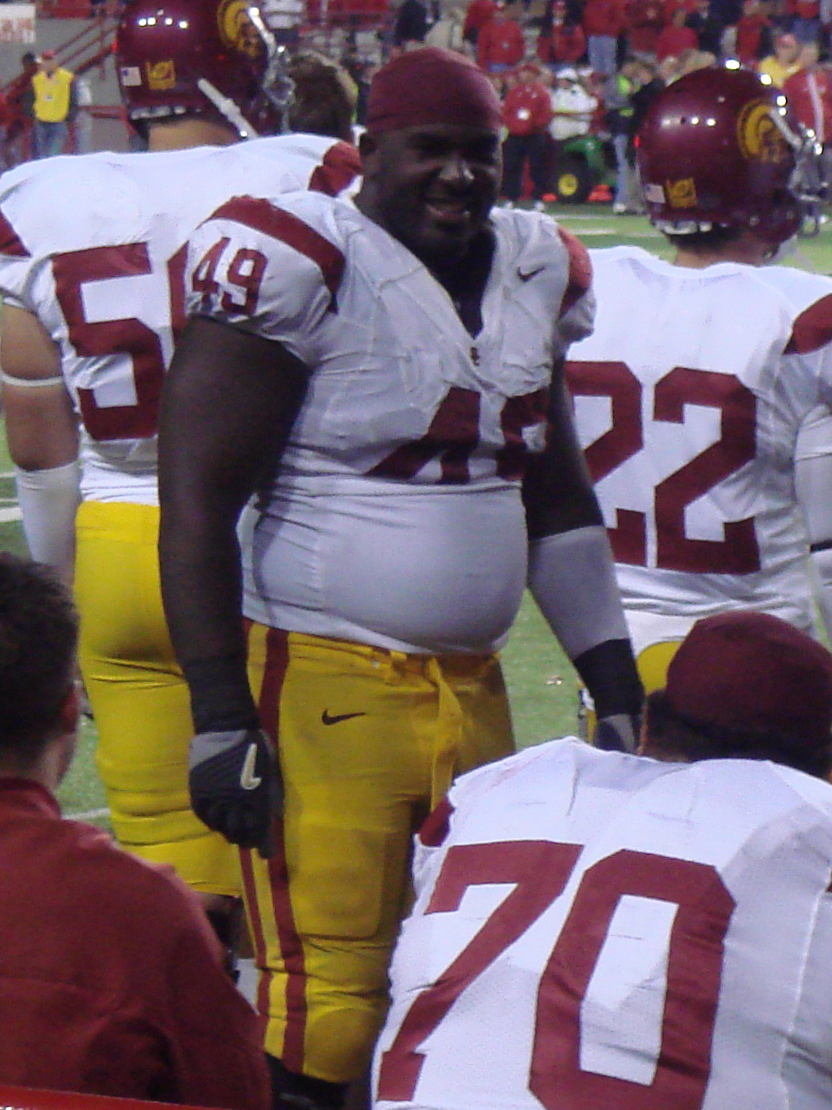
Nose tackle Sedrick Ellis was selected 7th overall in the 2008 NFL Draft.

Of all the Trojans' draft-eligible juniors, only offensive guard Chilo Rachal declared himself available for the 2008 NFL draft. Twelve USC players, eleven seniors and a junior, were invited to the NFL Scouting Combine, the most of any school in 2008: the seniors were offensive tackle Sam Baker, quarterback John David Booty, tight end Fred Davis, nose tackle Sedrick Ellis, defensive end Lawrence Jackson, offensive tackle Drew Radovich, linebacker Keith Rivers, center Matt Spanos, cornerback Terrell Thomas, running back Chauncey Washington, linebacker Thomas Williams, and the junior was offensive guard Rachal.

USC did well in the 2008 draft; ten players were taken overall, the most of any school, and a school-record seven players were selected in the first two rounds, beating the previous record of five (1968 and 2006) and the most in the first round. The first round selections were Ellis (seventh, New Orleans Saints), Rivers (ninth, Cincinnati Bengals), Baker (21st, Atlanta Falcons) and Jackson (28th, Seattle Seahawks); the second round picks were Rachal (39th, San Francisco 49ers), Davis (48th, Washington Redskins) and Thomas (63rd, New York Giants); the fifth round selections were Booty (137th, Minnesota Vikings) and Williams (155th, Jacksonville Jaguars); in the seventh round Washington was selected 213th by the Jacksonville Jaguars. Radovich signed as an undrafted free agent with the Minnesota Vikings; Spanos signed with the Miami Dolphins.

One year later, eleven more players were selected in the 2009 NFL draft, again leading all universities in the number of players drafted into the NFL that season. The first round selections were Mark Sanchez (fifth, New York Jets), Brian Cushing (15th, Houston Texans) and Clay Matthews (26th, Green Bay Packers); the second round picks were Rey Maualuga (38th, Cincinnati Bengals) and Fili Moala (56th, Indianapolis Colts); in the third round was Patrick Turner (87th, Miami Dolphins); in the fourth round were Kaluka Maiava (104th, Cleveland Browns) and Kyle Moore (117th, Tampa Bay Buccaneers); in the fifth round was David Buehler (172nd, Dallas Cowboys); and in the sixth round Cary Harris (183rd, Buffalo Bills) and Kevin Ellison (189th, San Diego Chargers).

During the 2010 NFL draft, USC had seven more players from the 2007 team drafted into the NFL, though none in the first round. The second round picks were Taylor Mays (49th, San Francisco 49ers) and Charles Brown (64th, New Orleans Saints); in the third round were Damien Williams (77th, Tennessee Titans) and Kevin Thomas (97th, Indianapolis Colts); in the fourth round were Everson Griffen (100th, Minnesota Vikings) and Joe McKnight (112th, New York Jets); and in the sixth round Anthony McCoy (185th, Seattle Seahawks).

At the 2011 NFL draft, USC tied for the most players drafted from any university into the NFL that year with nine. Of those, six were on the 2007 team, though none of those particular players were in the first round. Shareece Wright was selected in the third round (89th, San Diego Chargers); in the sixth round were Ronald Johnson (182nd, San Francisco 49ers) and Allen Bradford (187th, Tampa Bay Buccaneers); and in three consecutive picks in the seventh round were Stanley Havili (240th, Philadelphia Eagles), David Ausberry (241st, Oakland Raiders) and Malcolm Smith (242nd, Seattle Seahawks). Jordan Cameron, who had tried to transfer onto the team but forced to wait a year at a junior college before enrolling, was drafted in the fourth round (102nd, Cleveland Browns). Finally, at the 2012 NFL draft, Rhett Ellison was taken in the fourth round (128th, Minnesota Vikings).

=== Awards ===
Senior Fred Davis became the first Trojan to win the John Mackey Award, awarded to the nation's top tight end. Five Trojans were selected to the various 2007 College Football All-America Teams. In addition to Fred Davis, tackle Sam Baker earned his third-straight spot on an All-American team. On the defense, tackle Sedrick Ellis, linebacker Keith Rivers, and safety Taylor Mays all earned All-American honors. Ellis was named the Pacific-10 Conference Defensive Player of the Year by league coaches, and selected to the All-Conference first team defense along with defensive end Lawrence Jackson, linebackers Rivers and Rey Maualuga, and cornerback Kevin Ellison. The All-Conference first team offense included Davis, Baker, and offensive lineman Chilo Rachal.

The Trojans had nine players invited to participate in the Senior Bowl in Mobile, Alabama: Baker, quarterback John David Booty, Davis, Ellis, Jackson, offensive linemen Drew Radovich, Rivers, cornerback Terrell Thomas and running back Chauncey Washington. All nine players were placed on the North team, which was coached by Lane Kiffin, who had coached for the Trojans between 2001 and 2006 before becoming the head coach of the Oakland Raiders. The nine players sent by USC were the second-most ever invited from one team in a single season, one less than the 10 players by Alabama in 1987 and tied with the nine players sent by Auburn in 1988, though the earlier selection rules favored the two locally based schools.
