= 2007 California Golden Bears football team =

American college football season

2007 California Golden Bears football

Armed Forces Bowl champion

Armed Forces Bowl, W 42–36 vs. Air Force
- Conference: Pacific-10 Conference
- Record: 7–6 (3–6 Pac-10)
- Head coach: Jeff Tedford (6th season)
- Offensive coordinator: Jim Michalczik (1st season)
- Offensive scheme: Pro-style
- Defensive coordinator: Bob Gregory (6th season)
- Base defense: 4–3
- MVP: 2: Thomas DeCoud; Justin Forsett
- Captains: Thomas DeCoud; Craig Stevens
- Home stadium: California Memorial Stadium (Capacity: 72,516)

2007 Pacific-10 Conference football standings
	Conf.			Overall
Team	W		L	W		L
No. 3 USC +	7	–	2	11	–	2
No. 16 Arizona State +	7	–	2	10	–	3
No. 25 Oregon State	6	–	3	9	–	4
No. 23 Oregon	5	–	4	9	–	4
UCLA	5	–	4	6	–	7
Arizona	4	–	5	5	–	7
California	3	–	6	7	–	6
Washington State	3	–	6	5	–	7
Stanford	3	–	6	4	–	8
Washington	2	–	7	4	–	9
+ – Conference co-champions; Rankings from AP Poll

The 2007 California Golden Bears football team represented the University of California, Berkeley in the 2007 NCAA Division I FBS football season. They played their home games at California Memorial Stadium in Berkeley, California and were coached by Jeff Tedford.

California began the 2007 season ranked 12th in both the AP/USA Today Polls. In a nationally televised game on September 1, the Golden Bears defeated Tennessee 45–31. The Bears rose in the polls following subsequent victories against Colorado State, Louisiana Tech, and Arizona. California's defeat of then No. 11 Oregon in Eugene 31–24, combined with a series of losses from Oklahoma, Florida, and West Virginia, allowed the Bears to break into the top five. California had a bye the following week, but as a result of Stanford's surprise upset of then No. 2 USC on October 6, the Bears were ranked No. 2 in the country in the AP, Coaches, and Harris polls behind No. 1 LSU. This was the highest the team had been ranked since 1951.

With the Kentucky upset of LSU on October 13, the Bears had a shot at being the number one team in the nation along with Ohio State, but an upset loss to unranked Oregon State that same night dashed any hopes of a top ranking. The loss marked the beginning of a reversal in the second half of the season which saw the Bears winning only one game out of the next six and dropping out of the Top 25 entirely. The Bears lost to Washington for the first time in five years and to Stanford on the 25th anniversary of The Play, which resulted in the Cardinal regaining The Stanford Axe for the first time in six years under first year head coach Jim Harbaugh. California accepted an invitation to the 2007 Armed Forces Bowl against Air Force on December 31, where post a 42–36 victory to end the season 7–6, finished in 7th place in the Pac-10, and was unranked for the first time since 2003. Before the season even ended, Tedford declared there would be open competition for all positions on the team in 2008 and reevaluate every aspect of California's football program. Tedford made several coaching changes, most notably relinquishing offensive coordinator duties and hiring Frank Cignetti to play call and take over quarterback coaching duties.

At the end of the season, all of California's offensive stars at their skill position DeSean Jackson, Lavelle Hawkins, Robert Jordan, Justin Forsett and Craig Stevens graduated or declared for the NFL draft.

== Preseason ==
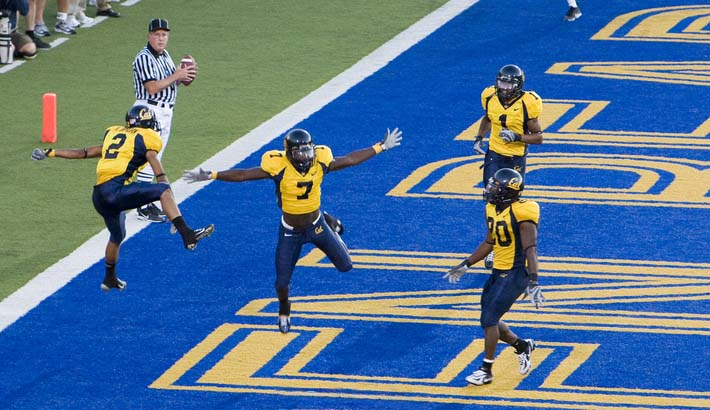
The Bears celebrate a touchdown

At the end of the 2006 season, offensive coordinator Mike Dunbar resigned to accept the coaching position of offensive coordinator at Minnesota. Mike Dunbar's first and only season at Cal was a success as Cal led the Pac-10 and ranked 11th in the nation in scoring with 32.8 points per game. He will be replaced by Cal assistant head coach and offensive line coach Jim Michalczik. Jim Michalczik joined the Cal staff upon Tedford's arrival in 2002 and was integral in the development of one of the most potent offenses in the nation. Cal is one of just five teams to rank in the top 25 in scoring in each of the last five years.

Cal RB Marshawn Lynch decided to forgo his senior season and enter the 2007 NFL draft at the end of the 2006 season. He was selected as the 12th overall pick by the Buffalo Bills. Cal DT Brandon Mebane (Seattle Seahawks, third round, No. 22), CB Daymeion Hughes (Indianapolis Colts, third round, No. 32), and ILB Desmond Bishop (Green Bay Packers, sixth round, No. 18) were also drafted. This marks the first time since 1996 that California has had three players taken in the first three rounds of the draft.

In the pre-season, returning veteran running back Justin Forsett was named one of the top-10 impact seniors for 2007. DeSean Jackson was a preseason Heisman Trophy candidate. Expectations for the 2007 were high as Coach Tedford declared the team to be "strongest and fastest" team he had coached at California despite losing several high defensive players to the NFL and graduation.

== Schedule ==
The schedule was ranked as the sixth-toughest home schedule.

Date	Time	Opponent	Rank	Site	TV	Result	Attendance	Source
September 1	5:00 p.m.	No. 15 Tennessee*	No. 12	California Memorial Stadium; Berkeley, CA	ABC	W 45–31	72,516	
September 8	11:00 a.m.	at Colorado State*	No. 10	Hughes Stadium; Fort Collins, CO	CSTV	W 34–28	27,805	
September 15	3:30 p.m.	Louisiana Tech*	No. 8	California Memorial Stadium; Berkeley, CA	CSN	W 42–12	58,057	
September 22	3:00 p.m.	Arizona	No. 6	California Memorial Stadium; Berkeley, CA	Versus	W 45–27	56,021	
September 29	12:30 p.m.	at No. 11 Oregon	No. 6	Autzen Stadium; Eugene, OR (College GameDay)	ABC	W 31–24	59,273	
October 13	4:00 p.m.	Oregon State^{†}	No. 2	Memorial Stadium; California Berkeley, CA	Versus	L 28–31	63,995	
October 20	12:30 p.m.	at UCLA	No. 10	Rose Bowl; Pasadena, CA (rivalry)	ABC	L 21–30	83,494	
October 27	7:00 p.m.	at No. 7 Arizona State	No. 18	Sun Devil Stadium; Tempe, AZ	FSN	L 20–31	71,706	
November 3	7:00 p.m.	Washington State		California Memorial Stadium; Berkeley, CA	FSN	W 20–17	55,711	
November 10	5:00 p.m.	No. 12 USC	No. 24	California Memorial Stadium; Berkeley, CA	ABC	L 17–24	72,516	
November 17	12:30 p.m.	at Washington		Husky Stadium; Seattle, WA	ABC	L 23–37	60,005	
December 1	4:00 p.m.	at Stanford		Stanford Stadium; Stanford, CA (Big Game)	Versus	L 13–20	49,209	
December 31	9:30 a.m.	vs. Air Force*		Amon G. Carter Stadium; Fort Worth, TX (Armed Forces Bowl)	ESPN	W 42–36	40,905	
*Non-conference game; ^{†}Homecoming; Rankings from AP Poll released prior to the game; All times are in Pacific time

== Rankings ==
Ranking movements Legend: ██ Increase in ranking ██ Decrease in ranking — = Not ranked RV = Received votes
	Week															
Poll	Pre	1	2	3	4	5	6	7	8	9	10	11	12	13	14	Final
AP	12	10	8	6	6	3	2	10	18	RV	24	RV	RV	—	—	—
Coaches Poll	12	10	8	8	6	3	2	9	20	RV	RV	RV	RV	—	—	—
Harris	Not released				6	3	2	10	18	RV	25	RV	RV	—	—	Not released
BCS	Not released							12	21	—	—	—	—	—	—	Not released

== Game summaries ==
=== Tennessee ===
#15 Tennessee at #12 California

Team	1	2	3	4	Total
Tennessee	14	7	7	3	31
• California	14	17	7	7	45

- Date: September 1
- Location: California Memorial Stadium, Berkeley, California
- Game start: 5:00 p.m. PST
- Game attendance: 72,516
- Television network: ABC

Scoring summary
1	13:09	CAL	Worrell Williams 44-yard fumble return (Jordan Kay kick)	CAL 7-0
1	10:07	TEN	Arian Foster 12-yard pass from Erik Ainge (Daniel Lincoln kick)	Tied 7-7
1	5:22	CAL	Nate Longshore 2-yard run (Jordan Kay kick)	CAL 14-7
1	3:03	TEN	Mario Hardesty 1-yard run (Daniel Lincoln kick)	Tied 14-14
2	12:23	CAL	DeSean Jackson 77-yard punt return (Jordan Kay kick)	CAL 21-14
2	6:54	TEN	Chris Brown 2-yard pass from Erik Ainge (Daniel Lincoln kick)	Tied 21-21
2	3:47	CAL	Robert Jordan 4-yard pass from Nate Longshore (Jordan Kay kick)	CAL 28-21
2	0:12	CAL	Jordan Kay 27-yard field goal	CAL 31-21
3	13:36	CAL	Lavelle Hawkins 3-yard pass from Nate Longshore (Jordan Kay kick)	CAL 38-21
3	3:57	TEN	Chris Brown 5-yard pass from Erik Ainge (Daniel Lincoln kick)	CAL 38-28
4	14:17	TEN	Daniel Lincoln 41-yard field goal	CAL 38-31
4	9:10	CAL	Justin Forsett 12-yard run (Jordan Kay kick)	CAL 45-31

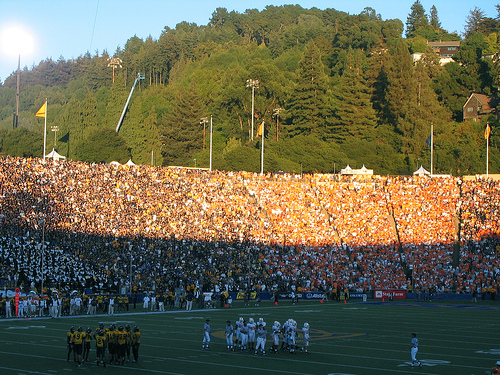
Sunset at Memorial Stadium mid game

The Vols traveled to Berkeley for the return trip in a home-and-home series with the California Golden Bears. The game was viewed by a national audience on ABC and was the only top 25 match up in the opening week. After Cal's loss to Tennessee the previous year, some observers and college football personalities such as LSU coach Les Miles had questioned the strength of the Pac-10. During the game, a plane with the banner "SEC rules, Pac-10 drools" flew overhead; however, during the fourth quarter, as Tennessee fans were somberly exiting Memorial Stadium in defeat, Cal fans bid them adieu with a loud and continuous chant of "Pac-10 football! Pac-10 football! Pac-10 football!" in response to Tennessee's "SEC! SEC!" chants after the previous year's victory. Cal's victory on a national stage in the only Pac-10/SEC match up helped further legitimize the strength of the Pac-10 and made Cal a contender for the national title at the time.

Jeff Tedford commented on the "revenge factor" before the game:

It's not really revenge, I think, if anything, it's redemption. But it's more about us, it's not so much about Tennessee. We didn't play very well last year when we went there and probably got caught a little too much focusing on them and the environment and that type of thing. So at practice this year, we're really just focusing on ourselves if we go out and play to our potential then we'll have a chance to be successful. Last year we didn't come close to our potential so we had no chance. Of course it's a big game like it was last year, two ranked teams, so there's a lot of people watching it to see what's going on. It wasn't that we lost the game last year, I think it was the way we lost the game last year that was the devastating part of it, that hung with us so long.

California had stressed "redemption" in this game, and ultimately came out the victors.

Tennessee gave up the opening points when quarterback Erik Ainge was hit while trying to release a pass and it flew backwards. California's Worrell Williams recovered the fumble and returned it 45 yards for the score. Cal WR DeSean Jackson also scored at touchdown on a 77-yard punt return. Cal QB Nate Longshore was 19-of-28 for 240 yards, 2 passing touchdowns and 1 rushing touchdown. Cal running back Justin Forsett rushed for 156 yards, a touchdown, and caught a screen pass that turned into a 49-yard gain. Cal out rushed Tennessee 230 to 111 and would never trail.

QB Erik Ainge played game despite suffering a broken pinky in practice. He was 32-of-47 for 270 yards and 3 touchdowns.

=== Colorado State ===
#10 California at Colorado State

Team	1	2	3	4	Total
• California	14	3	3	14	34
Colorado St	7	7	0	14	28

- Date: September 8
- Location: Hughes Stadium, Fort Collins, Colorado

California came in as 14-point favorites and came out struggling against Colorado State. Colorado State came out with a 7–0 lead early, as Cal's defense failed to stop the run. California answered with a huge play by DeSean Jackson, scoring on a 78-yard run play, and then scored on a Justin Forsett goal-line touchdown. The Rams scored another touchdown, as the Golden Bears added a field goal, to go into halftime with a 17–14 lead.

The second half started off with only a field goal by Cal scored in the third quarter. The Bears came alive in the 4th quarter and scored two touchdowns to all but seal the victory. With 5 minutes to go and holding a lead over the Rams, California replaced their defensive starters with backups. The backup secondary allowed two touchdowns within a minute, with Cal leading 34–28 with 3:00 left in regulation. California ran out the clock with their last possession, and left Sonny Lubick Field with the victory.

Longshore completed 19 of 29 passes for 146 yards. Forsett ran for 59 yards on 13 carries before leaving in the third quarter with a back stinger. Back up running back James Montgomery got his first collegiate carry and touchdown. Montgomery had a 12-yard run in the final minutes of the fourth quarter to allow Cal to run the clock. Freshman tailback Jahvid Best had a 34-yard touchdown run that provided the final margin needed for victory. Cal allowed 301 yards passing.

=== Louisiana Tech ===
Louisiana Tech at #8 California

Team	1	2	3	4	Total
Louisiana Tech	0	6	6	0	12
• California	7	21	7	7	42

- Date: September 15
- Location: California Memorial Stadium, Berkeley, California

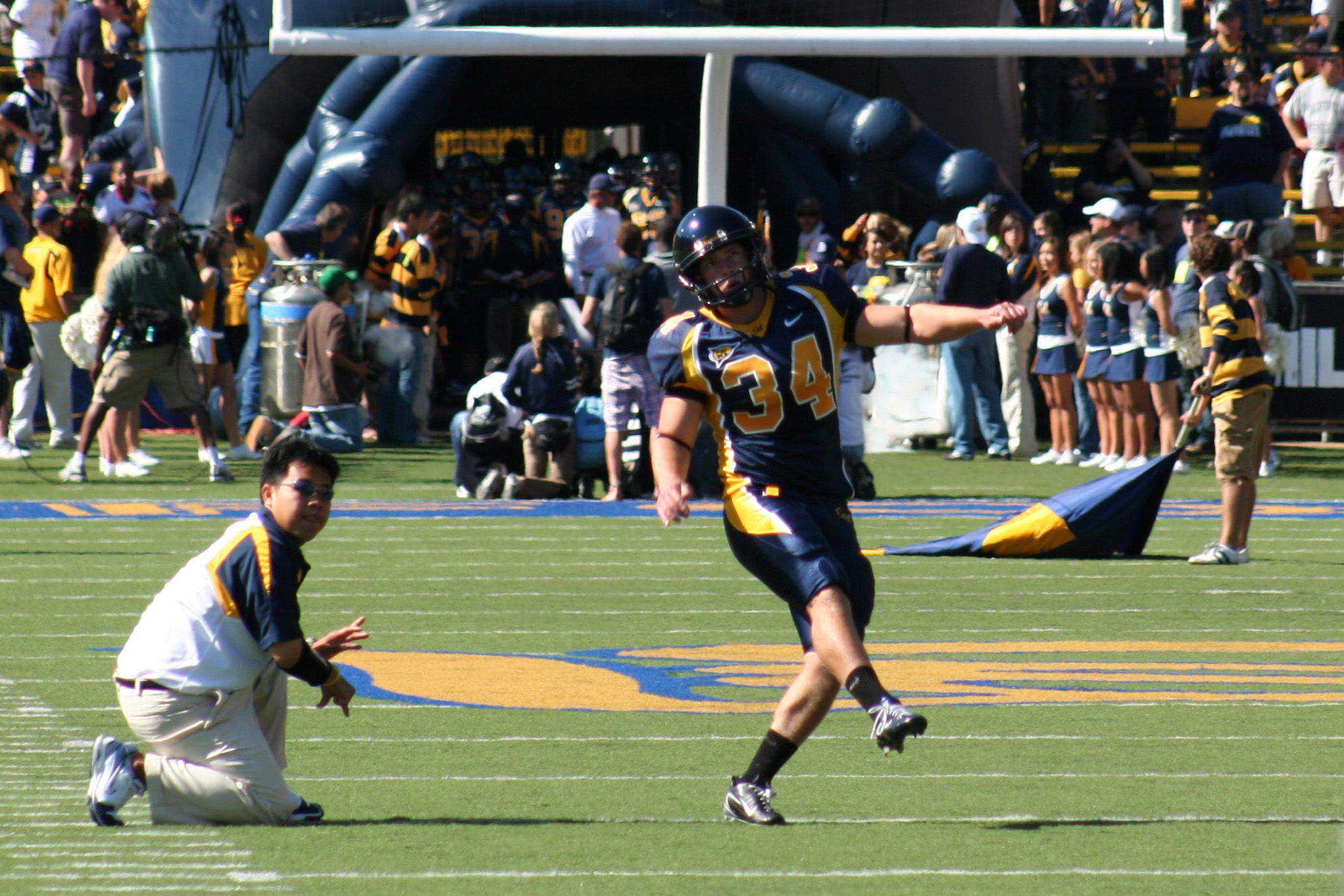
Cal kicker Jordan Kay warming up for the game.

The game started off quickly with a Lavelle Hawkins kickoff return that went ninety yards and spotted California an early lead. Hawkins lead Cal's receiving core with 87 yards returning.

Justin Forsett rushed for a total of 152 yards on twenty-three carries and three touchdowns, one of which was a score in the second quarter that gave Cal a 14–0 lead. The Bulldogs' Zac Champion threw a two-yard pass to Joe Anderson to get Louisiana Tech on the board, but kicker Danny Horwedel missed the PAT. The Bears would score twice again in the second quarter, giving Cal a 28–6 halftime advantage.

Cal quarterback Nate Longshore threw for 230 yards, two touchdowns and an interception, while the Bulldogs' Zac Champion threw for 149 yards, two touchdowns and two interceptions. One of Champion's touchdowns came in the third, a five-yard strike to Patrick Jackson, but Horwedel would again miss the PAT.

True freshman Jahvid Best would later on score a touchdown off of a Longshore pass, giving Cal the 35–12 lead. DeSean Jackson only had five catches for twenty-eight yards, due to a dislocated thumb he suffered during the game against Tennessee. Forsett would score once more in the fourth quarter, making the final score 42–12.

=== Arizona ===
Arizona at #8 California

Team	1	2	3	4	Total
Arizona	3	7	7	10	27
• California	28	3	7	7	45

- Date: September 22
- Location: California Memorial Stadium, Berkeley, California

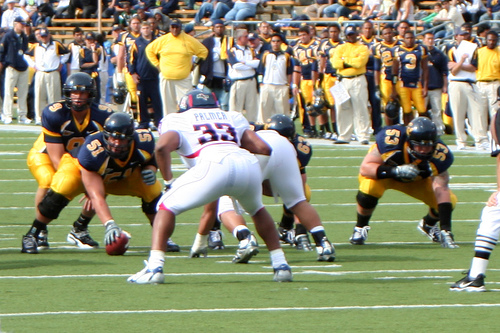
Cal on offense

Justin Forsett rushed for 117 yards and two touchdowns as Cal settled another year-old score with a 45–27 victory over Arizona Wildcats.

Three weeks after the Bears avenged last year's season-opening loss to Tennessee, they flattened the Wildcats by taking a 25-point lead in the first 13 minutes. However, the Bears were sloppy after their fast start, committing 14 penalties for 121 yards.

Cal defensive end Tyson Alualu scored on a fumble recovery during the first-quarter blitz, and the Bears defense fared well against Arizona's spread attack despite missing three injured starters – linebacker Zack Follett and defensive linemen Matt Malele and Rulon Davis.

DeSean Jackson had another quiet game for Cal with three catches for 39 yards, but he still helped. Arizona pooched a 19-yard punt away from Jackson after its opening drive, and Cal quickly drove for its first score when Forsett broke four tackles on a 9-yard TD run.

Hawkins then caught an 18-yard TD pass to cap a 77-yard drive that lasted 34 seconds, and Best rushed for a score on Cal's next drive as the Bears broke Arizona tackles on seemingly every play. Safety Thomas DeCoud blitzed Tuitama and forced the fumble Alualu recovered in the end zone with 2:12 left in the first quarter, putting the Bears up 28–3. Arizona steadily climbed back in the second half, with Tuitama scoring on a 1-yard run and Thomas catching a 4-yard TD pass early in the fourth.

Forsett, remembering last year's loss, lobbied to get back in the game after Arizona scored a touchdown to cut the lead down to eleven. He finished with a flourish: nine carries for 53 yards and a score on Cal's final two possessions.

Jahvid Best and James Montgomery also made scoring runs for the Golden Bears, whose 2006 loss in Tucson denied them an outright Pac-10 championship and a probable trip to Cal's first Rose Bowl in nearly a half-century.

Willie Tuitama set school records for pass attempts and completions, going 42-of-61 for 309 yards, but Arizona couldn't escape its huge early hole despite a strong second half. Mike Thomas had a career-high 12 catches, second-most in school history, for 105 yards and a score.

Though Arizona's final drive ended on downs with 3:46 left, the Wildcats seemed encouraged by their effort – after the first quarter.

The win marked Cal's 10th straight win at Memorial Stadium.

=== Oregon ===
#6 California at #12 Oregon

Team	1	2	3	4	Total
• California	0	3	7	21	31
Oregon	3	7	7	7	24

- Date: September 29
- Location: Autzen Stadium, Eugene, Oregon

Scoring summary
1	0:47	ORE	Matt Evensen 32-yard field goal	ORE 3-0
2	6:20	CAL	Jordan Kay 34-yard field goal	Tied 3-3
2	1:44	ORE	Jonathan Stewart 5-yard run (Matt Evensen kick)	ORE 10-3
3	4:44	CAL	DeSean Jackson 25-yard pass from Nate Longshore (Jordan Kay kick)	Tied 10-10
3	2:39	ORE	Cameron Colvin 42-yard pass from Dennis Dixon (Matt Evensen kick)	ORE 17-10
4	14:20	CAL	Justin Forsett 1-yard run (Jordan Kay kick)	Tied 17-17
4	11:52	CAL	DeSean Jackson 31-yard pass from Nate Longshore (Jordan Kay kick)	CAL 24-17
4	7:06	ORE	Dennis Dixon 1-yard run (Matt Evensen kick)	Tied 24-24
4	3:11	CAL	Justin Forsett 1-yard run (Jordan Kay kick)	CAL 31-24

The California Golden Bears traveled to Eugene, Oregon to face the Ducks in Autzen Stadium. Both teams were undefeated leading into the game of two Pac-10 heavyweights.

In what was a close game that came down to the final minute and the game included nine lead changes. Nate Longshore threw for 285 yards and 2 touchdowns, while his counterpart Dennis Dixon threw for 306 yards and one touchdown, rushed for another touchdown, but threw two interceptions. DeSean Jackson had 161 yards on 11 reception and caught 2 touchdown passes. Justin Forsett ran for 101 yards on 23 carries with two touchdown runs.

Oregon had 97 yards more offense than Cal, but the games outcome ultimately was decided on turnovers. Oregon committed four turnovers, all in the 4th quarter, while Cal had none. They needed all four, because the biggest turnover for the Bears came from Marcus Ezeff's hit on Oregon's Cameron Colvin, forcing him to fumble it into the endzone for a California touchback in the game's final seconds to preserve victory.

After beating Oregon, the Bears were ranked 3rd in the country, their highest rank since 1952. After Stanford beat #2 USC 24–23 during California's bye week, the Bears were ranked 2nd in the country, their highest rank since 1951, when they were ranked #1.

=== Oregon State ===
Oregon State at #2 California

Team	1	2	3	4	Total
• Oregon State	7	6	7	11	31
California	0	14	0	14	28

- Date: October 13
- Location: California Memorial Stadium, Berkeley, California

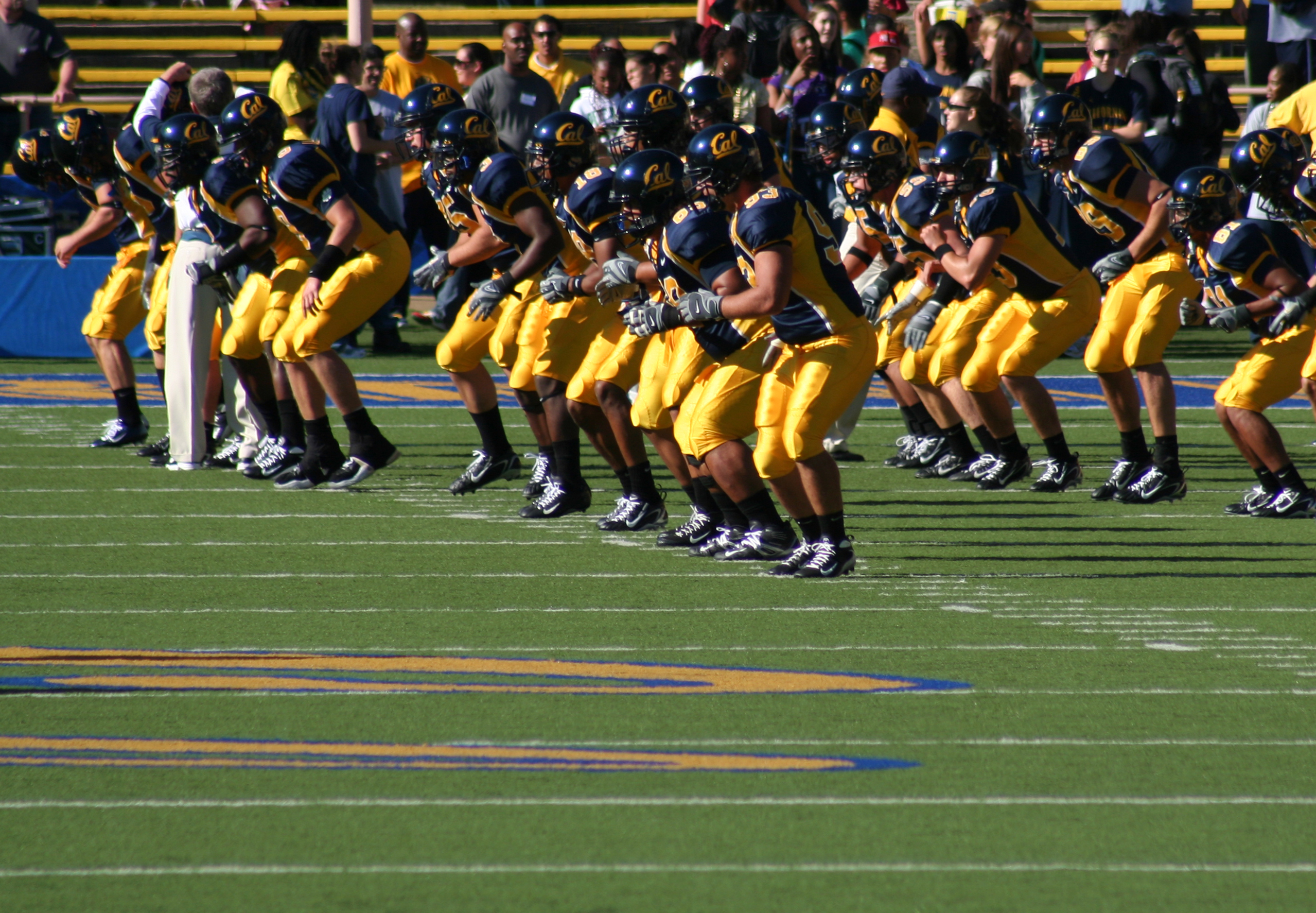
The team warm ups for the Oregon State game.

Cal was ranked #2 in the nation going into the homecoming game match up with Oregon State. Cal has not been ranked #1 since 1951 under Pappy Waldorf. With a large crowd of just under 64,000, the Bears were favored to win this Pac-10 match up despite the Beavers having won their last four games at Memorial Stadium. The game marked the 22nd consecutive game with over 50,000 fans in attendance.

Ten minutes before the start of the game, backup quarterback Kevin Riley was informed he would start for the injured Nate Longshore whose ankle was injured during the final minutes of the game against Oregon. Riley threw for 294 yards and two touchdowns with interception and ran for another touchdown. Justin Forsett rushed for 150 yards and one touchdown on 28 carries against the nation's then top-ranked rush defense. Lavelle Hawkins led Cal's receivers with 192 yards from 9 receptions.

On a day where the number-one-ranked LSU Tigers were upset by the 17th-ranked Kentucky Wildcats, the California Golden Bears had an opportunity to move to the number one spot. In the first quarter, it was announced to the crowd that LSU had lost, causing a large chant of "We're No. 1! We're No. 1!" from the crowd, especially the alumni who were closer to Cal's offense on the field. On the next play, Cal's offense had a false start that led to a stalled offensive drive. During the game, there were several instances where advertising or cheers would continue on into Cal's offensive drives. According to Oregon State players after the game, Cal's presumed number ranking they were informed of during halftime motivated them in the second half. The defeat ended a 10-game home winning streak.

Cal, however, proved it was not immune to the upset bug in a college football season that seemed to feature a new number one and number two team each week, and California fell to the feisty Beavers 31–28. A favorable turnover ratio for California in the first 5 games ended with Cal losing three turnovers to Oregon State's one. Cal doubled its season's fumble total with fumbles by Justin Forsett in the first quarter and a critical special teams fumble by Javhid Best in the fourth quarter that led to a field goal providing the final margin of victory. Cal's defense could not stop Oregon State running back Yvenson Bernard during the second half when he ran for 82 yards including a crucial 4th and goal score.

The game featured three 4th and Goal with one yard to go plays. Oregon State converted both its opportunities in this situation while Cal late in the third quarter was stopped. Cal was 1st and 2 yards to goal to go on that drive late in third quarter but running back Justin Forsett was stopped short of the end zone on 4 consecutive plays.

The game is best known for its dramatic and (for Cal fans) heartbreaking ending. Cal began the fourth quarter down 20–14, but it took only two plays and a 7-yard run by Justin Forsett for the Bears to take back the lead 21–20. Oregon State responded with a touchdown, a two-point conversion, and a field goal following Best's fumble that stretched the Oregon State lead to 31–20. Cal gained no yards on its next possession and punted and Oregon State ran the clock and punted on its next possession. With 3:15 left on the game clock, Cal scored a touchdown on a 55-second drive that ended with a 64-yard touchdown reception by Lavelle Hawkins. After an on-side kick where Oregon State recovered the ball, Oregon State ran the clock and punted, giving Cal back the ball on the 6-yard line with 1:27 remaining.

With no timeouts, Riley impressively drove his team up to Oregon State's 12-yard line. Early in the drive, Riley barely avoided getting sacked in the end zone for a safety and then completed an 18-yard pass to Hawkins. Riley also converted a 19-yard pass on 4th and 17 to Hawkins to keep the drive alive. In the game's final play, with a 3rd down and 14 seconds left, Riley chose to scramble towards the end zone instead of spiking the ball to set up a field goal to take the game into overtime. He was unsuccessful, tackled after a 2-yard gain. The clock ran out before Cal's field goal unit could set up on the field, giving Oregon State the victory. Sports commentators observed that his poor decision to scramble was typical of an inexperienced quarterback.

After the game Riley told reporters: "I knew there were 14 seconds left on the clock, and the initial read wasn't there. I saw some green field, and I thought I could get around that guy. I was just using playing-ball instincts. I was in the middle of the play. I just couldn't make one."

Riley's last-minute play was widely replayed on ESPN throughout the 2007–2008 college football season as an example of one of the many upsets in college football.

=== UCLA ===
#10 California at UCLA

Team	1	2	3	4	Total
California	7	7	7	0	21
• UCLA	0	13	7	10	30

- Date: October 20
- Location: Rose Bowl, Pasadena, California
- Game attendance: 83,494

With both teams suffering surprising upsets at home in their previous games, both Cal and UCLA came into their Rose Bowl matchup looking to restore their reputations and Pac-10 title hopes. Despite out of conference losses to Notre Dame and Utah, UCLA remained undefeated in the conference at 4–0 and controlled their Pac-10 destiny. Cal had suffered only the loss from last week and were returning Nate Longshore back to the lineup. The game was played at the Rose Bowl with 83,494 in attendance.

The game was very close and included several lead changes. DeSean Jackson had 136 yards and two touchdowns on 9 receptions. Justin Forsett was held to 76 yards on 25 carries. Cal tight end Craig Stevens also caught a 21-yard touchdown pass in the first quarter. Cal entered the fourth quarter with a 21–20 lead, but Cal could not put UCLA away. Cal was stopped on its first two fourth quarter sequences that included 7 of the 8 plays as running plays. After UCLA scored a field goal to take a 23–21 lead and with only around two minutes left on the clock, the Bears went the air. Just outside field goal range, Longshore attempted a third down with 1:33 left on the clock which was intercepted by UCLA corner back Alterraun Verner who ran for a 76-yard touchdown putting the score at 30–21 Bruins. On his next drive, Longshore attempted a 4th and 10 he was again intercepted by Keyes. UCLA converted a first down and ran the clock for the victory. Over the next five plays UCLA made a net of 9 yards and a first down to hold onto the ball and win the game 30–21. Longshore finished 232 yards, 3 touchdowns, and three interceptions.

California's defense allowed UCLA to rush for 183 yards (Kahlil Bell rushed for 142 yards) while recording one sack. The team recovered 2 UCLA fumbles, but could not create any points off those turnovers (and one turnover would lead to a Longshore interception). Cal's loss effectively ended their chances of a national championship.

=== Arizona State ===
#20 California at #7 Arizona State

Team	1	2	3	4	Total
California	13	7	0	0	20
• Arizona State	0	14	10	7	31

- Date: October 27
- Location: Sun Devil Stadium, Tempe, Arizona

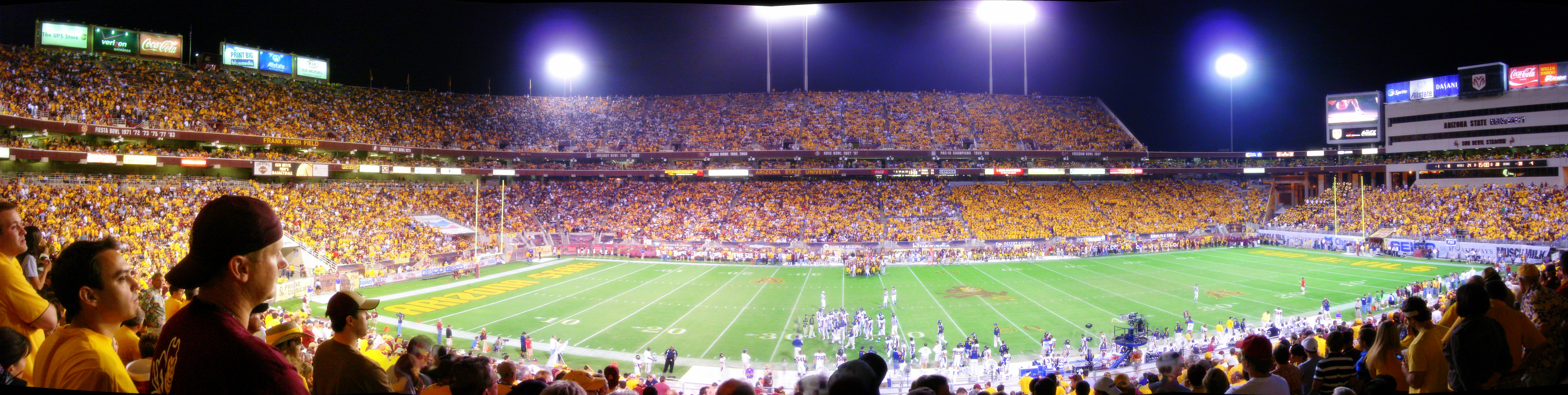
A panoramic view of the game.

This Pac-10 match up was an opportunity for Cal to end its two-game slide. For Arizona State, the game was its first opportunity to play a top 25 opponent and to solidify their position as a national title game contender. California started strong. Defensive end Rulon returned to the lineup after being injured in the Louisiana Tech game. On the game's first play, Rulon sacked Arizona State quarterback Rudy Carpenter. On Arizona State's next possession, Rulon forced a fumble that was Cameron Jordan for a touchdown.

California jumped out to a 20–7 lead in the middle of the second quarter with the help of two field goals by Jordan Kay and a DeSean Jackson touchdown pass. But after that, it was all Arizona State. Cal's defense allowed 144 yards rushing and a 4th and short touchdown run in the 3rd quarter that gave Arizona State a lead it would not surrender. Nate Longshore threw for 261 yards and a touchdown, but threw 2 interceptions in the second half. Longshore limped at times, appearing to be nursing the ankle injury he suffered at Oregon Cal's offense was shut out in the second half and Arizona State won 31–20, causing California to fall out of the top 25.

=== Washington State ===
Washington State at California

Team	1	2	3	4	Total
Washington State	0	0	6	11	17
• California	7	3	3	7	20

- Date: November 3
- Location: California Memorial Stadium, Berkeley, California

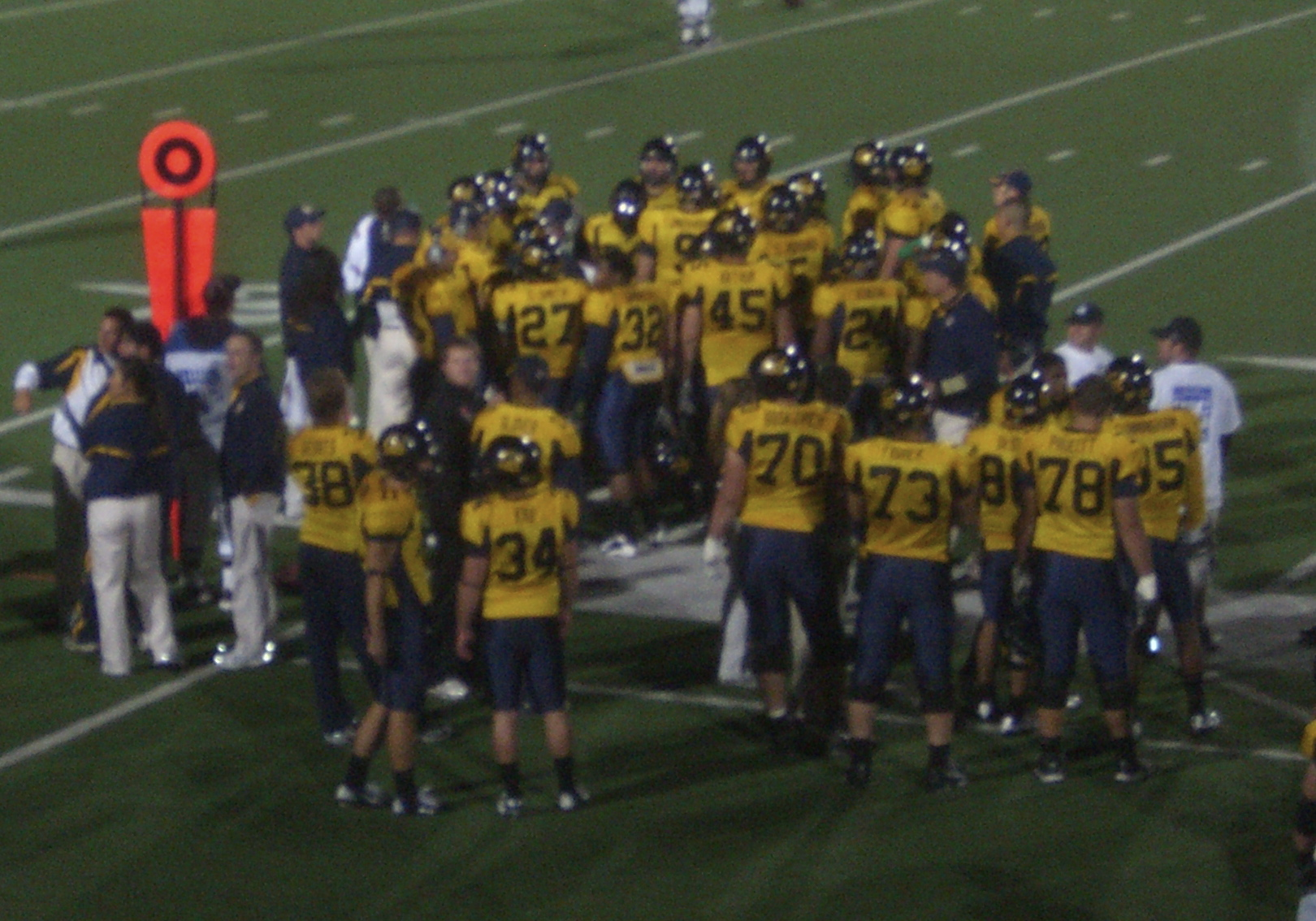
Cal on the sidelines.

California returned home to Strawberry Canyon hoping to end a 3-game losing streak. The Bears were expected to easily defeat Washington State, a team that had one of the Pac-10's worst records, but the game was very tight. Longshore's second half of game problems continued as he fumbled the ball in the third and threw an interception in the fourth quarter. Longshore finished with 213 yards passing. Cal's defense allowed Washington State to pass for 306 yards and one touchdown. Justin Forsett ran for 132 yards and two touchdowns. At the beginning of the 4th quarter, Forsett fumbled on a second in goal, but later in the quarter he redeemed himself with a 44-yard touchdown run. Washington State drove down the field in the game final minutes and scored a touchdown and a two-point conversion, but California recovered the onside kick and escaped with a win.

=== USC ===
#15 USC at California

Team	1	2	3	4	Total
• USC	7	7	3	7	24
California	7	3	7	0	17

- Date: November 10
- Location: California Memorial Stadium, Berkeley, California

In the pre-season, this game was named as one of candidates for the 10 most important games of 2007, with head coach Pete Carroll's Trojans national title hopes hinging on proving themselves against a veteran in-conference rival.

By November 2007, the game was about pride with both teams national title hopes dashed by USC's losses to Stanford and Oregon, and Cal's 3 in a row loss to Oregon State, UCLA, and Arizona State. Played in the Memorial Stadium in Berkeley under intense rain, the Golden Bears donned throwback uniforms honoring 1975 All-American Cal quarterback Joe Roth. Designed by Nike, the helmet was gold with 2 blue lines bordering a center white line. The Cal logo on the side of the helmet was replaced by a white C inside a blue oval. The jerseys were blue with yellow numbering but does not feature the player's name. 2 blue lines bordered a white center line down the side of the yellow pants.

With 7 minutes and 18 seconds remaining in the first quarter, Cal drew first blood with a 17-yard run into the end zone from running back Justin Forsett. 1 minute and 58 seconds and 5 plays later, USC answered with a 5-yard touchdown pass by Stanley Havili thrown by John David Booty. Booty finished the game 129 and one touchdown pass. He fumbled the ball once.

In the 2nd quarter with 8 minutes and 51 seconds left, Cal's Jordan Kay kicked a 23-yard field goal. USC answered 9 plays later with a 36-yard run into the end zone by running back Chauncey Washington. The score at the end of the half was USC 14, Cal 10.

USC returned in the 2nd half with 28 yard field goal by David Buehler with 9 minutes and 57 seconds left in the quarter. With 57 seconds left in the 3rd quarter, Cal quarterback Nate Longshore completed a 20-yard pass to Lavelle Hawkins for a touchdown.

In the 4th quarter with 7 minutes and 38 seconds left, USC broke the tie of 17 all with a 3-yard touchdown run by Stafon Johnson. Cal attempted to mount a drive to tie the game in the remaining minutes but failed when USC's Terrell Thomas intercepted a pass from Nate Longshore intended for Cal wide receiver Robert Jordan with 2 minutes and 37 seconds left. Longshore also lost a fumble earlier in the 4th quarter. USC ran out the clock to preserve the 24–17 win.

Because of the game rainy conditions, the running game was extensively used by both teams. USC's Washington ran for 220 yards on 29 carries and a touchdown. Cal's Forsett ran for 164 yards and a touchdown. He also caught 2 passes for 45 yards. Washington and Booty both lost the ball on fumbles primarily because of the game's wet conditions. DeSean Jackson had 64 yards on 5 receptions and Hawkins had 53 yards on 3 receptions and a touchdown.

=== Washington ===
California at Washington

Team	1	2	3	4	Total
California	6	14	3	0	23
• Washington	14	14	6	3	37

- Date: November 17
- Location: Husky Stadium, Seattle

California was favored to win on the road in Washington against one of the Pac-10's bottom teams in terms of records. Washington was also without starting quarterback Jake Locker who sat the game with an injury, but the game went poorly for California. Defensive Captain Free Safety Thomas DeCoud made a mistake in the coin toss that gave Washington the ball to start at both halves. Washington jumped out to a 14–0 lead over the Bears. Cal would respond with 3 touchdowns in the first half. Jordan Kay missed the PAT on the first touchdown. Save for a solitary field goal, Cal would be held scoreless in the second half.

The game's outcome was determined on the ground, which was dominated by Washington. Led by running back Louis Rankin, who himself rushed for 224 yards, the Huskies ran for 334 yards and 3 touchdowns and produced 37 points of offense despite backup quarterback Carl Bonnell only throwing for 108 yards. Cal's Justin Forsett ran for 141 yards. Longshore finished the game with 236 passing yards and 3 touchdowns to 1 interception. Washington broke a five-game losing streak to Cal, beating the Bears at home 37 to 23. After the game, Coach Tedford yelled at his players in the locker room and claimed responsibility for the loss when taking to reporters by claiming the team "was not coached well."

=== Stanford ===
California at Stanford

Team	1	2	3	4	Total
California	7	3	0	3	13
• Stanford	7	6	7	0	20

- Date: December 1
- Location: Stanford Stadium, Stanford, California

Cal trailed Stanford for the entirety of the 110th Big Game, losing 20–13 and relinquishing The Axe after holding onto it for five straight years, marking Tedford's first loss to the Cardinal, something Cardinal coach Jim Harbaugh's two predecessors had failed to do. Stanford confused Cal on defense by alternating quarterbacks T.C. Ostrander and Tavita Pritchard in offensive series. Longshore was 22/47 with 252 yards, 1 touchdown, and two interceptions, throwing one at the 7 yard line with 2:10 remaining. Justin Forsett ran for 96 yards on 19 carries. Robert Jordan caught 4 receptions for 99 yards including a 46-yard touchdown reception. Despite injuries that had depleted the Cardinal's backfield to the point where one player was converted to a running back, Stanford rushed for 120 yards. California's offense was limited to one touchdown and a field goal, Cal's worst offensive performance of the season. Longshore continued to struggle in the second half, leading the offense to only one field goal after half time. Cal committed 10 penalties for 118 yards.

=== 2007 Armed Forces Bowl ===
Air Force vs. California
Armed Forces Bowl

Team	1	2	3	4	Total
• California	0	14	14	14	42
Air Force	7	14	6	9	36

- Date: December 31
- Location: Amon G. Carter Stadium, Fort Worth, Texas

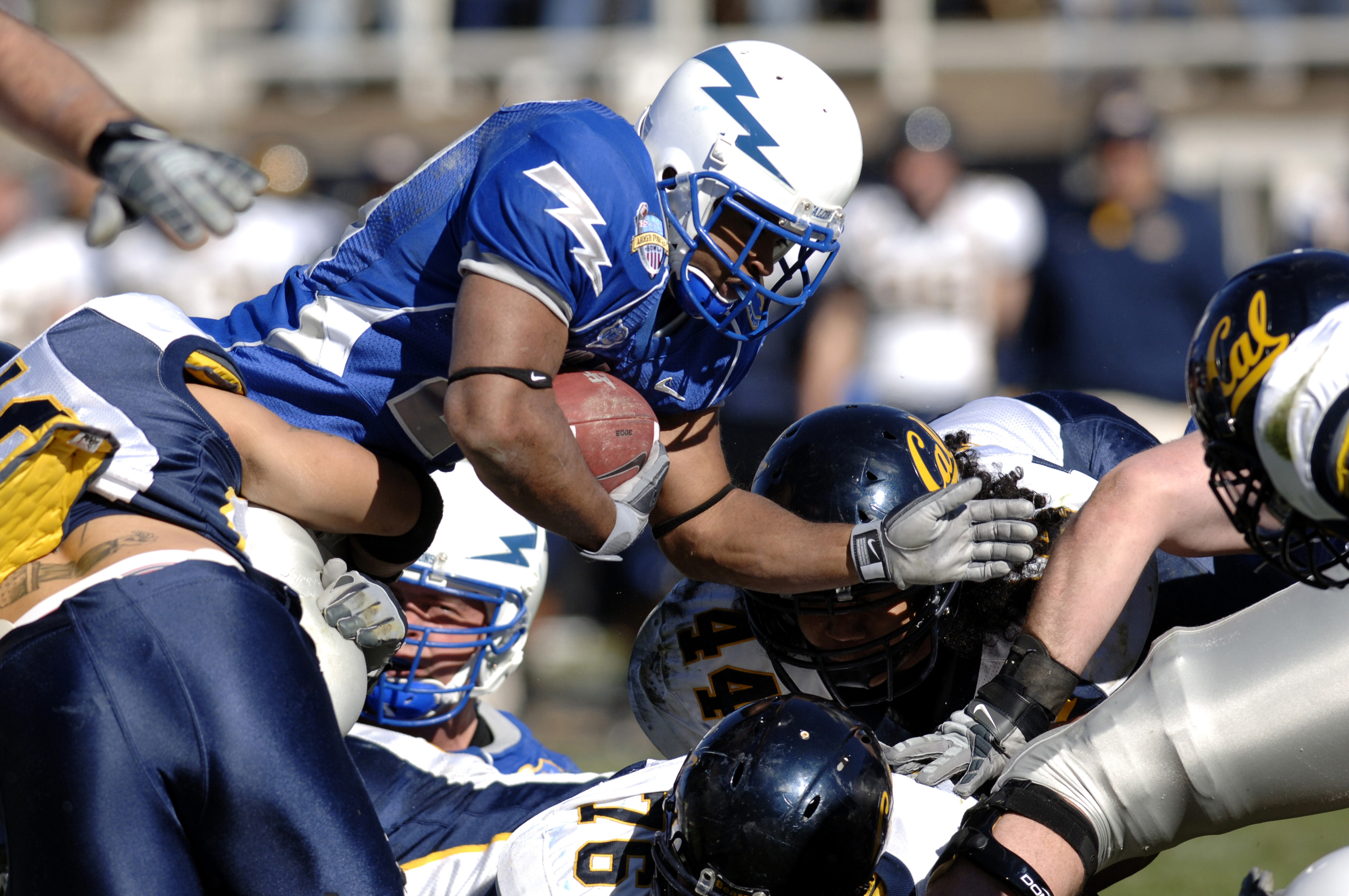
The Bears' defense halts Air Force fullback Ryan Williams.

The Bears' 6–6 record was just enough to qualify the Bears for the 2007 Armed Forces Bowl. The Bears struggled early against the Falcons, who ran up 21 unanswered points under the leadership of quarterback Shaun Carney. Nate Longshore started, but was ineffective, hampered by the absence of DeSean Jackson and Robert Jordan, who with Thomas DeCoud sat out the first quarter for violating unspecified team rules. The two receivers made an impact when they took the field alongside Kevin Riley, who replaced Longshore at quarterback in the second quarter. Riley completed touchdown passes to DeSean Jackson and Lavelle Hawkins to make it 21–14 Falcons at the half.

Carney was injured in the third quarter and did not return to the game. He finished with one touchdown pass and 108 yards rushing. Backup Shea Smith, who had not played all year, replaced Carney. The Falcons were limited to a pair of field goals, while Robert Jordan caught a touchdown pass from Riley and Justin Forsett ran in for another score. Forsett rushed for another touchdown in the fourth quarter, as did Riley. Air Force was limited to field goals until they capitalized on a botched kickoff return to score a touchdown with over two minutes left, but failed to recover an onside kick. Alongside Carney, Falcons running back Jim Ollis also eclipsed the 100 yard rushing mark with 101, while Forsett had 140. Riley completed 269 passing yards and was the game MVP. Cal ended the 2007 season with its first win in four games, while handing Air Force their first loss in four games.

== Aftermath ==
Cal's season was considered by many fans, players, and Coach Tedford to be a major disappointment. Cal was ranked as high as number #2 after a 5–0 start and Cal lost 6 of its last 7 regular season games, just making the Armed Forces Bowl. Many fans blamed the play of quarterback Nate Longshore for Cal's decline. Longshore's injury at Oregon appeared to physically affect his play for several games, though some sports commentators during broadcasts late in the season speculated that the ankle injury had mentally affected Longshore. Riley's performance in the Oregon State and Armed Forces Bowl have left an open debate about who will be Cal's quarterback next year.

On the day preceding the Armed Forces Bowl, Tedford declared there would be open competition for all positions on the team in 2008. In early January, Tedford reorganized his coaching staff, most notably hiring Frank Cignetti as his offensive coordinator and quarterbacks coach. Tedford said he would give some of the play calling responsibility to Cignetti so he could spend more time with on special teams and defensive players. Tedford also hired Al Simmons as defensive backs coach. Tedford said he would reevaluate every aspect of Cal's football program and would make changes after Cal's disappointing season.

Center Alex Mack, the Pac-10's top offensive lineman elected to return for his senior year, which would also allow him to complete his degree. One week later, wide receive DeSean Jackson announced that he would forgo his senior year and enter the NFL draft. Lavelle Hawkins, Robert Jordan, Justin Forsett and Craig Stevens also graduated or declared for the NFL draft.

== Players ==
=== Depth chart ===
These were the primary starters and backups through the 2007 season.

Defense

FS
Thomas DeCoud
Robert Peele

WLB	MLB	SLB
⋅	Worrell Williams	⋅
Mike Mohamed	Greg Van Hoesen	⋅

ROV
Bernard Hicks
Marcus Ezeff

CB
Syd'Quan Thompson
Darian Hagan

DE	DT	DT	DE
Rulon Davis	Matt Malele	Mika Kane	Tyson Alualu
John Allen	Jonathan Karacozoff	Tad Smith	Cameron Jordan

CB
Brandon Hampton
Chris Conte

Offense

WR
Lavelle Hawkins
Robert Jordan

LT	LG	C	RG	RT
Mike Gibson	Brian De La Puente	Alex Mack	Noris Malele	Mike Tepper
Chet Teofilo	Mark Gray	Chris Guarnero	Mark Boskovich	Matt Laird

TE
Craig Stevens
Cameron Morrah

WR
DeSean Jackson
Sean Young

QB
Nate Longshore
Kevin Riley

FB
Will Ta'ufo'ou
Brian Holley

RB
Justin Forsett
Jahvid Best

=== Roster ===
(as of 09/01/2007)
Wide receivers: 1 DeSean Jackson^{†} – Junior; 2 Robert Jordan ^{†} – Senior; 3 Jeremy Ross – Freshman; 6 Nyan Boateng – Junior; 7 Lavelle Hawkins – Senior; 18 Drew Glover – Junior; 46 Cooper Miller – Freshman; 80 Daniel Lofton – Freshman; 81 Cameron Toler – Sophomore; 82 Alex Lagemann – (redshirt) Freshman; 84 Michael Calvin – (redshirt) Freshman; 85 LaReylle Cunningham – Junior; 86 Sam DeSa – Senior; 87 Alex Stroud – Junior; 88 Sean Young – Senior; Offensive line: 51 Alex Mack^{†} – Junior; 53 Mike Gibson^{†} – Senior; 54 Chris Guarnero – Freshman; 55 Noris Malele^{†} – Junior; 57 Todd Huber – (redshirt) Freshman; 58 Chet Teofilo – Junior; 61 Justin Cheadle – (redshirt) Freshman; 63 Brian De La Puente^{†} – Senior; 70 Mark Boskovich – Freshman; 71 Sam DeMartinis – (redshirt) Freshman; 72 Mitchell Schwartz – (redshirt) Freshman; 73 Richard Fisher – Freshman; 75 Matt Summers-Gavin – (redshirt) Freshman; 76 Matt Laird – Freshman; 77 Mark Gray – Senior; 78 Justin Prueitt – Freshman; 79 Mike Tepper^{†} – Junior; Tight ends: 5 Cameron Morrah – Sophomore; 19 Craig Stevens ^{†} – Senior; 45 Julian Arthur^{†} – Senior; 83 Skylar Curran – Sophomore; 89 Garry Graffort – Freshman; 99 Savaiʻi Eselu – (redshirt) Freshman	Quarterbacks: 9 Nate Longshore^{†} – Junior; 10 Brock Mansion – (redshirt) Freshman; 13 Kevin Riley – Freshman; 14 Cory Smits – Sophomore; 16 Bryan Van Meter – Junior; Running backs: 4 Jahvid Best – Freshman; 20 Justin Forsett^{†} – Senior; 21 James Montgomery – Freshman; 22 Tracy Slocum – (redshirt) Freshman; 24 Shane Vereen – (redshirt) Freshman; 34 Bryan Schutte – Sophomore; Fullbacks: 23 Will Ta'ufo'ou^{†} – Junior; 27 Zach Smith – Junior; 31 John Tyndall – (redshirt) Freshman; 32 R.J. Garrett – Freshman; 33 Brian Holley – Sophomore; 38 Peter Geurts – (redshirt) Freshman; Defensive ends: 44 Tyson Alualu^{†} – Sophomore; 50 Jonathan Karacozoff – Sophomore; 54 Justin Gates – (redshirt) Freshman; 57 Keith Browner – Freshman; 90 Scott Smith – (redshirt) Freshman; 91 Cody Jones – Sophomore; 94 Rulon Davis^{†} – Junior; 95 Ernest Owusu – (redshirt) Freshman; 96 Solomona Aigamaua – (redshirt) Freshman; 97 Cameron Jordan – Freshman; 99 Phillip Mbakogu – Senior; Defensive tackles: 69 Matthew Malele^{†} – Senior; 76 Derrick Hill – Sophomore; 77 Michael Costanzo – Freshman; 92 Tad Smith – Sophomore; 93 John Allen – Senior; 98 Mika Kane^{†} – Junior	Linebackers: 1 Worrell Williams^{†} – Junior; 9 Eddie Young – Sophomore; 10 Devin Bishop – Junior; 13 D.J. Holt – (redshirt) Freshman; 15 Anthony Felder^{†} – Junior; 16 Justin Moye – Senior; 18 Michael Mohamed – Freshman; 19 Eric Morrah – Senior; 33 Matt Russi – Sophomore; 42 Shea McIntyre – Sophomore; 43 Charles Johnson – Sophomore; 45 Tyler Morrow – Junior; 49 Linden Fowler – (redshirt) Freshman; 55 Greg Van Hoesen – Senior; 56 Zack Follett^{†} – Junior; Defensive backs: 3 Brandon Hampton^{†} – Senior; 5 Syd'Quan Thompson^{†} – Sophomore; 6 Gary Doxy – Sophomore; 11 Sean Cattouse – (redshirt) Freshman; 17 Chris Conte – Freshman; 20 Jesse Brooks – Sophomore; 23 Brandon Jones – Freshman; 25 Brett Johnson – Sophomore; 26 Darian Hagan – Freshman; 27 Charles Amadi – Freshman; 36 Will Kapp – (redshirt) Freshman; 48 Gavin Beeman – Freshman; Safeties: 2 Bernard Hicks^{†} – Junior; 4 Thomas DeCoud^{†} – Senior; 7 Robert Peele – Sophomore; 8 D.J. Campbell – (redshirt) Freshman; 28 Kenny Frank – Senior; 29 Marcus Ezeff – Sophomore; Punters: 11 Andrew Larson^{†} – Senior; 19 Bryan Anger – (redshirt) Freshman; 35 Ryan Theimer – Freshman; 41 Scott Wingert – Senior; Kickers: 14 Nick Demopoulos – Freshman; 15 Tom Schneider^{†} – Senior; 30 Joe Robles – Freshman; 34 Jordan Kay – Junior; Long snapper: 68 Nick Sundberg^{†} – Junior
† Projected starter at position * Injured; will not play in 2007.

== Players drafted into the NFL ==
Round	Pick	Player	Position	NFL club
2	49	DeSean Jackson	WR	Philadelphia Eagles
3	85	Craig Stevens	TE	Tennessee Titans
3	98	Thomas DeCoud	S	Atlanta Falcons
4	126	Lavelle Hawkins	WR	Tennessee Titans
6	184	Mike Gibson	OT	Philadelphia Eagles
7	233	Justin Forsett	RB	Seattle Seahawks

== Coaching staff ==
- Jeff Tedford – Head coach – 6th year
- Jim Michalczik – Offensive coordinator/offensive line – 1st year (6th year with team)
- Bob Gregory – Defensive coordinator – 6th year
- Pete Alamar – Special teams/tight ends – 5th year
- Kevin Daft – Quarterbacks – 1st year (4th year with team)
- Kenwick Thompson – Assistant head coach/linebackers – 1st year
- Ken Delgado – Defensive line – 6th year
- Ron Gould – Running backs – 11th year
- Dan Ferrigno – Wide receivers – 2nd year
- R. Todd Littlejohn – Defensive backs – 2nd year
- Matt Beck – Offensive graduate assistant – 1st year
- Tosh Lupoi – Defensive graduate assistant – 2nd year
- Sanjay Lal – Offensive administrative assistant – 2nd year
