= Marshawn Lynch =

American football player and actor (born 1986)

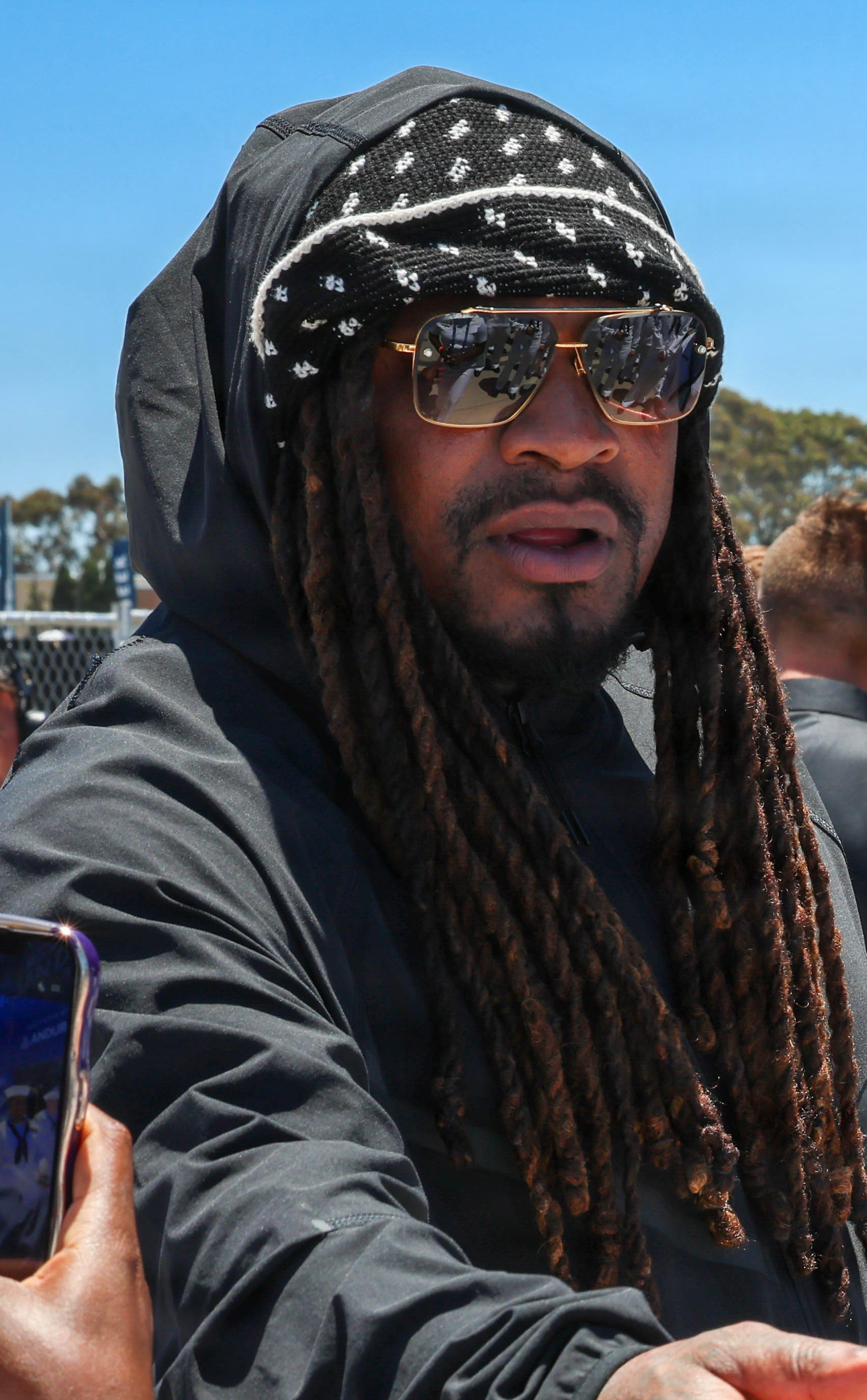
- Lynch in 2026

No. 23, 24
- Position: Running back

Personal information
- Born: April 22, 1986 (age 40); Oakland, California, U.S.
- Listed height: 5 ft 11 in (1.80 m)
- Listed weight: 215 lb (98 kg)

Career information
- High school: Oakland Technical
- College: California (2004–2006)
- NFL draft: 2007: 1st round, 12th overall pick

Career history

Playing
- Buffalo Bills (2007–2010); Seattle Seahawks (2010–2015); Oakland Raiders (2017–2018); Seattle Seahawks (2019)

Operations
- Bay Area Panthers (2019–present) Owner; FCF Beasts (2022–present) Owner; Seattle Kraken (2022–present) Minority owner

Awards and highlights
- Super Bowl champion (XLVIII); First-team All-Pro (2012); Second-team All-Pro (2014); 5× Pro Bowl (2008, 2011–2014); 2× NFL rushing touchdowns leader (2013, 2014); NFL 2010s All-Decade Team; Seattle Seahawks Top 50 players; PFWA All-Rookie Team (2007); First-team All-American (2006); Pac-10 Offensive Player of the Year (2006); First-team All-Pac-10 (2006)

Career NFL statistics
- Rushing yards: 10,413
- Rushing average: 4.2
- Rushing touchdowns: 85
- Receptions: 287
- Receiving yards: 2,214
- Receiving touchdowns: 9
- Stats at Pro Football Reference

Marshawn Terrell Lynch (born April 22, 1986) is an American former professional football running back who played in the National Football League (NFL) for 12 seasons. Nicknamed "Beast Mode", he spent the majority of his career with the Seattle Seahawks. He played college football for the California Golden Bears, earning first-team All-American honors and winning Pac-10 Offensive Player of the Year in 2006. Lynch was selected in the first round of the 2007 NFL draft by the Buffalo Bills, where he played three full seasons and earned Pro Bowl honors in 2008. He was traded to the Seahawks during the 2010 season.

With Seattle from 2010 to 2015, Lynch twice led the league in rushing touchdowns while extending his Pro Bowl selections to five and receiving one first-team All-Pro selection. He also helped the team win their first Super Bowl title in Super Bowl XLVIII. His Beast Quake touchdown during the 2010–11 NFL playoffs, which saw him rush for 67 yards while breaking nine tackles, is considered one of the greatest runs in NFL history.

Lynch retired in 2015 following an injury-plagued year, but returned to the NFL in 2017 to play for the Oakland Raiders. After two seasons, Lynch retired a second time until he reunited with the Seahawks in 2019 for their last regular season game and playoff run. Since retiring for a third and final time, he has co-owned the Seattle Kraken of the National Hockey League (NHL), Beasts of Fan Controlled Football (FCF), and the Bay Area Panthers of the Indoor Football League (IFL).

== Early life and education ==
Lynch grew up in Oakland, California, with three older siblings. He was raised by his mother, Delisa, who once held a 200-meter track record at Oakland Technical High School. Lynch started playing youth football in Oakland at a young age.

Lynch attended and graduated from the same high school as his mother, Oakland Technical High School, from 2000 to 2004.

At Oakland Tech, Lynch was a four-sport star for the Bulldogs football, basketball, track, and wrestling teams. In his 2003 season, Lynch amassed 1,722 rushing yards and 23 touchdowns in only eight regular-season games and an additional 375 rushing yards and 10 touchdowns in two postseason games. He was voted a PrepStar and SuperPrep All-American and was also voted the San Francisco East Bay Player of the Year. In basketball, he played on the Oakland Tech's team alongside future Cal star Leon Powe. Lynch helped lead his team to the state semi-finals. As an athlete in the Bay Area, Lynch befriended and often played against film director and writer Ryan Coogler; who also grew up in the same part of Oakland as Lynch.

In addition to football, Lynch excelled in track and field, where he competed mainly as a sprinter, but also in jumping events. He recorded a personal-best time of 10.94 seconds in the 100-meter dash as a senior, while also posting top-leaps of 1.94 meters (6 ft, 4 in) in the high jump and 6.38 meters (20 ft, 10 in) in the long jump.

Lynch was a versatile athlete on the football field. He played defensive back, quarterback, wide receiver, and linebacker in high school. Rivals.com recruiting network had him ranked #2 in the nation at running back behind Adrian Peterson.

He attended the University of California, Berkeley, where he majored in social welfare and played for the Golden Bears football team from 2004 to 2006.

In 2020, he received an honorary degree from Princeton University after he was invited to be the Class of 2020 speaker.

College recruiting
Name	Hometown	School	Height	Weight	40^{‡}	Commit date
Marshawn Lynch; RB	Oakland, California	Oakland Tech	5 ft 11 in (1.80 m)	215 lb (98 kg)	4.4	Jul 8, 2004
Marshawn Lynch; RB	Recruit ratings: Scout: Rivals:					
Overall recruit ranking: Scout: 2 (RB) Rivals: 2 (RB)
Note: In many cases, Scout, Rivals, 247Sports, On3, and ESPN may conflict in their listings of height and weight.; In these cases, the average was taken. ESPN grades are on a 100-point scale.; Sources: "2004 Team Ranking". Rivals.com.

== College career ==
=== 2004 season ===
As a true freshman in 2004 at University of California Berkeley, Lynch was the primary backup to senior J. J. Arrington. In his collegiate debut against Air Force in the regular-season opener, he had seven carries for 92 yards and a touchdown in the 56–14 victory. On November 13, in the 42–12 victory over Washington, he had nine carries for 121 rushing yards and two rushing touchdowns to go along with a 29-yard touchdown reception. One week later, against Stanford, Lynch had 122 rushing yards and one rushing touchdown. In addition, he threw a 20-yard touchdown pass to Burl Toler in the 41–6 victory. Overall, Lynch carried the ball 71 times for 628 yards with eight rushing touchdowns and 147 yards on 19 receptions and two receiving touchdowns in his freshman season.

=== 2005 season ===
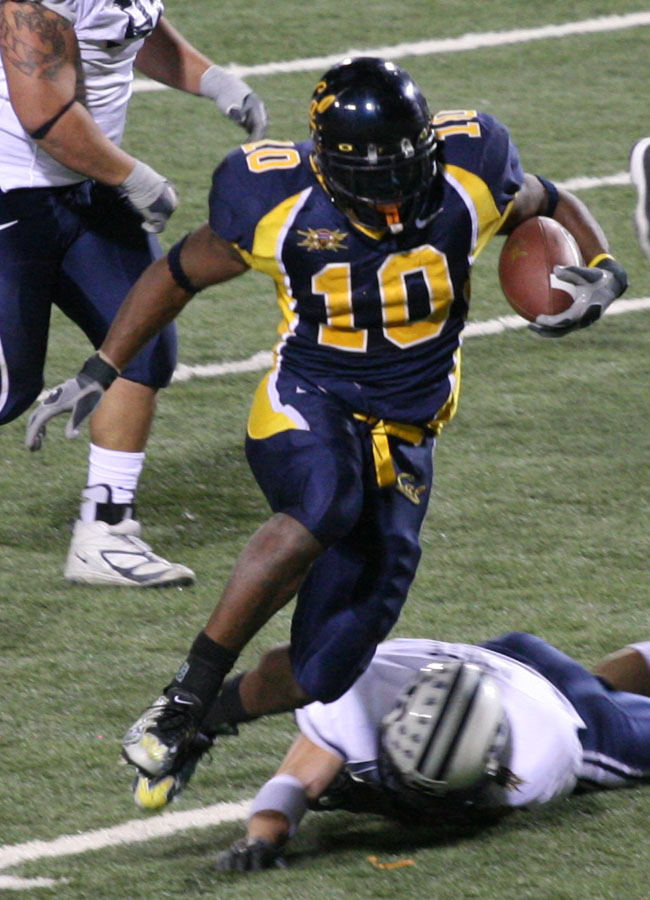
Lynch playing against BYU at the 2005 Las Vegas Bowl

In 2005, Arrington had graduated and Lynch became the starting running back. Lynch wore jersey No. 24 his freshman year but switched to No. 10, his high school number. This switch placed him in sequence with his cousins Virdell Larkins, who wore No. 9, and Robert Jordan, who wore No. 11. Lynch and his cousins were teammates at Cal. Lynch started off the season strong with 24 carries for 147 rushing yards and a rushing touchdown in the 41–3 victory over Sacramento State. Almost a month later, on October 1, he had 107 rushing yards and a rushing touchdown in a 28–0 victory over Arizona. The next week, he had 135 rushing yards and a rushing touchdown in the 47–40 loss to UCLA. On October 22, against Washington State, he had 160 rushing yards and a rushing touchdown in the 42–38 loss. In the next game, a 27–20 loss to Oregon, he had 189 rushing yards and two rushing touchdowns. In the regular-season finale against the Stanford Cardinal, he had 123 rushing yards and a rushing touchdown in the 27–3 victory. In the 2005 Las Vegas Bowl, Lynch ran for 194 yards and three touchdowns on 24 carries and was named MVP against BYU. Even though he missed two games due to a hand and finger injury, he still amassed 1,246 rushing yards with 10 rushing touchdowns on 196 carries and 125 receiving yards on 15 receptions. He finished fifth in the Pac-10 in rushing yards and sixth in rushing touchdowns.

=== 2006 season ===
In the 2006 preseason, Lynch earned a spot on the watchlist for the Maxwell Award, was named 8th best player in the nation by Sports Illustrated, and earned several preseason All-American accolades. In the spring, he joined the Cal Track & Field team, and he competed in the 60-meter dash, recording a personal-best time of 6.98 seconds at the 2006 MPSF Championships.

On July 22, 2006, the Cal football program officially launched the campaign for Lynch to win the 2006 Heisman Trophy with the opening of the website Marshawn10.com, featuring Lynch's highlights from 2004 to 2006.

In the second game of the season, against Minnesota, Lynch had 139 rushing yards and two rushing touchdowns in the 42–17 victory. In the next game against Portland State, he finished with 112 rushing yards and a touchdown in the 42–16 victory. In the following game against Arizona State, he had 17 carries for 124 yards in the 49–21 victory. In the next game, against Oregon State, he posted his fourth consecutive 100-yard game with 106 yards and a touchdown in the 41–13 victory. After a 50-yard performance in the 45–24 victory over the Oregon Ducks, he had 152 rushing yards and two touchdowns in the 21–3 victory over Washington State. In the next game against Washington, he had another stellar game with 150 rushing yards and two touchdowns, including the game-winning overtime touchdown, in the 31–24 victory. He later called the run his favorite career highlight, after which Lynch spontaneously drove around the football field in an injury cart, pretending to ghost ride. Lynch was named to the 2006 All-Pac-10 team First-team for his performance in the 2006 season. Lynch was also named the Pac-10 Offensive Player of the Year in 2006 and an AFCA (Coaches') All-America in 2006.

In his final game for Cal, Lynch ran for 111 yards and two touchdowns in the 45–10 victory over Texas A&M in the Pacific Life Holiday Bowl on December 28, 2006. He shared the Co-Offensive Player of the Game award with teammate, quarterback Nate Longshore. He finished his final season with Golden Bears with a Pac-10 leading 1,356 rushing yards, 11 rushing touchdowns, 34 receptions, 328 receiving yards, and four receiving touchdowns.

Lynch holds the Cal school record for most 100-yard rushing games with 17.

On January 2, 2007, Lynch announced he would forgo his senior season and enter the 2007 NFL draft.

== Professional career ==
Pre-draft measurables
Height	Weight	Arm length	Hand span	40-yard dash	10-yard split	20-yard split	20-yard shuttle	Three-cone drill	Vertical jump	Broad jump	Bench press	Wonderlic
5 ft 11 1/8 in (1.81 m)	215 lb (98 kg)	31 1/8 in (0.79 m)	9 1/4 in (0.23 m)	4.46 s	1.60 s	2.67 s	4.55 s	7.05 s	35.5 in (0.90 m)	10 ft 5 in (3.18 m)	20 reps	14
All values from NFL Combine

=== Buffalo Bills ===
==== 2007 season ====
On April 28, 2007, Lynch was selected by the Buffalo Bills with the 12th overall pick in the first round of the NFL draft, the second running back taken. He was the highest running back taken from Cal since Chuck Muncie was taken third overall in the 1976 NFL draft. He agreed with the Bills to a six-year, $18.935 million contract. The deal included a $3 million signing bonus and contained $10.285 million in total guarantees.

Lynch entered the NFL as the starter at running back for the Bills. In his first career regular-season game on September 9, he gained 90 yards on 19 carries and scored his first touchdown in a 14–15 loss to the Denver Broncos. His breakout game came on November 4 against the Cincinnati Bengals. Lynch's success on the ground was instrumental in keeping the touted Cincinnati offense on the sidelines, as he rushed 29 times for 153 yards, including a 56-yard touchdown run. Lynch also completed a touchdown pass to tight end Robert Royal, the first touchdown pass completed by a Bills non-quarterback since running back Joe Cribbs in 1981.

Lynch injured his ankle the following week against the Miami Dolphins and missed the next three games. He returned to play on December 9 for the Bills' second game against the Miami Dolphins that season, rushing for 107 yards and fumbling for the first time in his NFL career. The game marked the first time the Bills' offense produced two 100-yard rushers since 1996, as Fred Jackson also rushed for 115 yards. Lynch went over the 1,000-yard rushing mark on December 23 against the New York Giants, scoring a touchdown in the 21–38 loss, which resulted in the Giants clinching a playoff berth. This made Lynch the fourth Bills rookie to break the 1,000-yard mark, and the first since Greg Bell in 1984. He closed out the regular season with 105 rushing yards and 22 receiving yards against the Philadelphia Eagles. He finished a successful rookie season with 1,115 total rushing yards and seven touchdowns. He was named to the NFL All-Rookie Team for the 2007 season.

Lynch was expected to be more involved in Buffalo's passing game in 2008, his second season as a professional. The Bills' new offensive coordinator Turk Schonert had stated a number of times that he anticipated Lynch "being in on third down a lot more" this season, citing Lynch's inexperience as a reason he was not very involved in the 2007 season.

==== 2008 season ====
Lynch started the 2008 season with four rushing touchdowns in his first three games against the Seattle Seahawks, Jacksonville Jaguars, and Oakland Raiders. He was held to a season low of 16 yards rushing in a Week 9 matchup against the New York Jets on November 2. He did not break 100 yards rushing in a game until November 17 on a Monday Night Football matchup against the Cleveland Browns, when he rushed for 119. The game also marked his first receiving touchdown. Two weeks later on November 30, Lynch posted a season-high 134 rushing yards against the San Francisco 49ers. Lynch went over the 1,000-yard mark for the season on December 14 in a rematch against the Jets when he rushed for 127 yards. He was able to stay healthy until injuring his shoulder in the second half of a Bills victory on December 21 against the Denver Broncos, during which he rushed for his eighth touchdown of the season. The injury kept him out of the Bills' season finale against the New England Patriots. Lynch finished the 2008 season with 1,036 yards rushing and eight rushing touchdowns. He posted 300 receiving yards on 47 receptions, including a receiving touchdown, compared to 184 yards on 18 receptions for the 2007 season. Lynch was selected to his first Pro Bowl, replacing injured Tennessee Titans running back Chris Johnson. This made him the first Bills running back to head to the Pro Bowl since Travis Henry in 2002. Lynch was initially the first alternate.

==== 2009 season ====
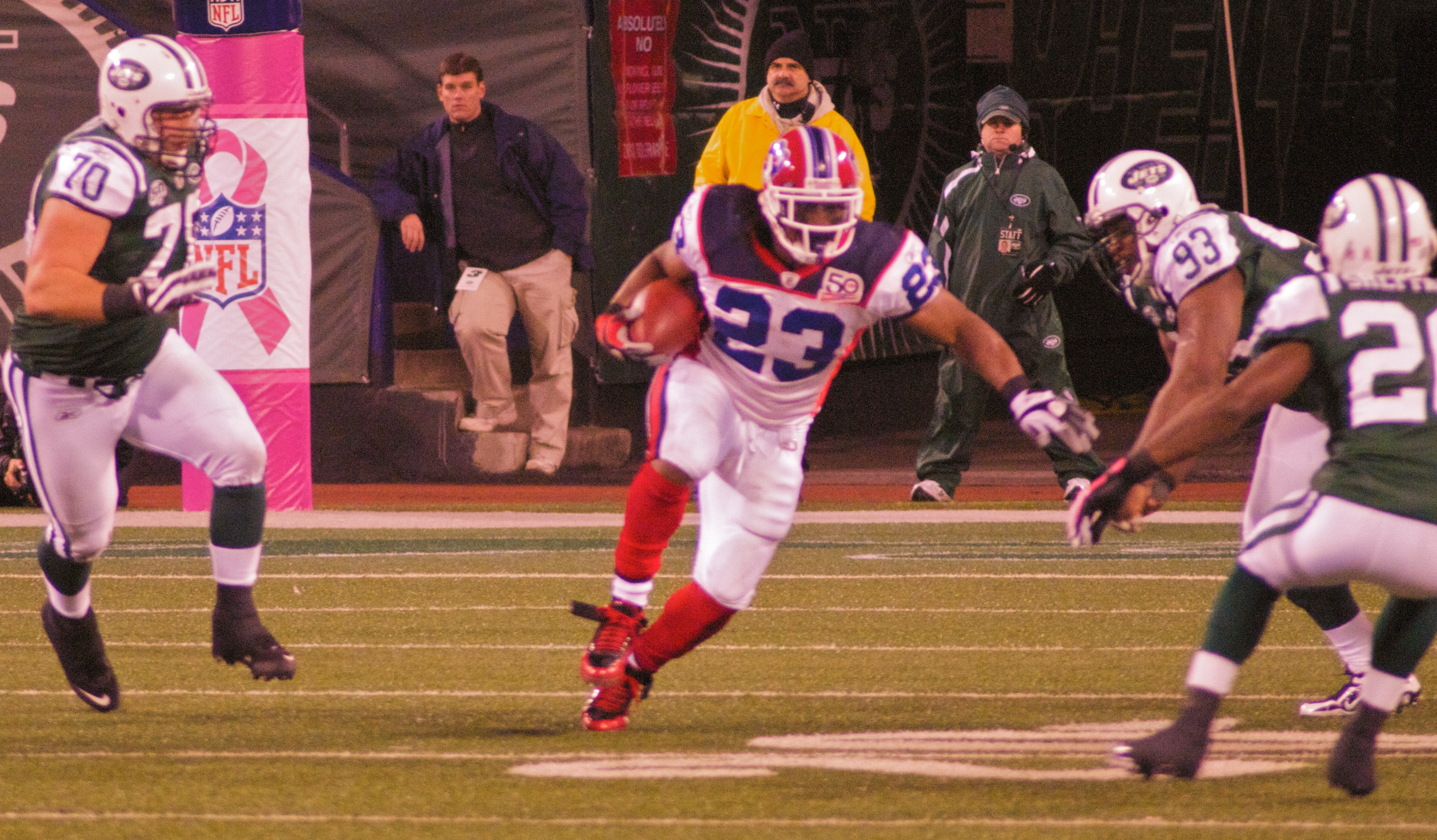
Lynch carries the ball against the New York Jets in October 2009

Following his guilty plea on misdemeanor weapons charges during the 2009 off-season, Lynch met with NFL Commissioner Roger Goodell for a disciplinary hearing. Lynch had been arrested in Culver City, California, for having a gun in his backpack in the trunk of a car he was occupying, a crime in California. On April 9, the NFL announced that Lynch would be suspended for the Bills' first three games for violations of the NFL's personal conduct policy. Lynch appealed the league's suspension on May 14 in an attempt to have it reduced or nullified, only to have it upheld by Goodell later on August 3. When interviewed on the topic, Lynch has said that he was not surprised when the suspension was upheld and that he loves playing too much and will try to keep himself out of situations in which there is a risk of being suspended.

Lynch played his first game of the 2009 season against the Miami Dolphins and played the rest of the season. Beginning November 29, he was replaced as the Bills' starting running back by Fred Jackson, who had the first 1,000-yard rushing season of his career. Lynch finished the season with 450 yards on 120 carries with two rushing touchdowns and did not break 100 rushing yards in a single game for the first time in his career.

==== 2010 season ====
Lynch suffered an ankle sprain in the Bills' preseason opener against the Washington Redskins and was expected to be out for three to four weeks. He started three games for the Bills before being traded to the Seattle Seahawks on October 5 for two draft picks, a fourth-round pick in the 2011 NFL draft and a conditional pick in the 2012 NFL draft, which would become a fifth-round pick.

=== Seattle Seahawks (first stint) ===
==== 2010 season ====
Lynch then reunited with former Cal roommate and fellow running back Justin Forsett, a seventh-round draft pick of the Seahawks in 2008. Lynch scored his first touchdown of the season with the Seahawks on October 17 on a 1-yard run against the Chicago Bears. On December 5, he scored three touchdowns against the Carolina Panthers. Lynch had 202 carries for 737 rushing yards and six rushing touchdowns during the 2010 season.

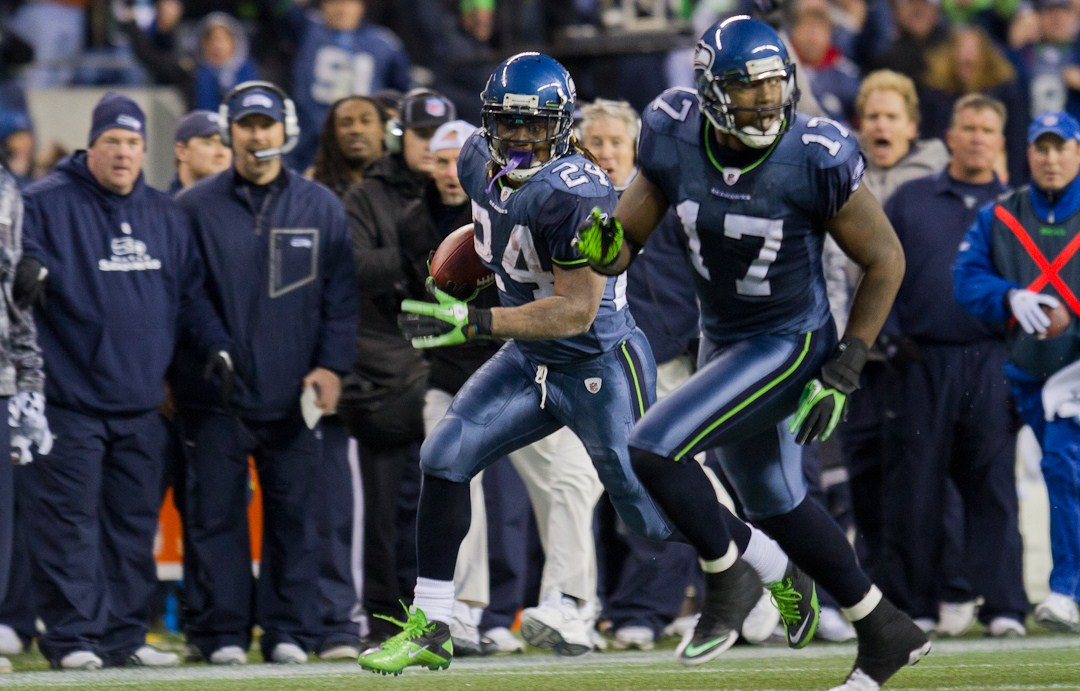
Lynch during his Beast Quake run in the Seahawks' 2011 NFC Wild Card game

In his first career playoff game, against the New Orleans Saints on January 8, 2011, Lynch had a 67-yard touchdown run in which he broke nine tackles and with one arm threw Saints cornerback Tracy Porter to the ground. This run has become known locally in Seattle as the "Beast Quake". The play gets its name from Marshawn Lynch's nickname, "Beast Mode", and the fact that, during and after the play, movement from fans jumping in celebration was so intense that it registered on a seismograph 100 yards from the stadium. In the Divisional Round against the Chicago Bears, he was limited to four carries for two yards in the 35–24 loss.

==== 2011 season ====
Lynch started 15 games in 2011, missing only one regular-season game, on November 23 due to back problems. Lynch rushed for 1,204 yards and 12 touchdowns, both career bests and posting his first 1,000-yard season since 2008. On December 1, against the Philadelphia Eagles, he was observed receiving Skittles from a trainer to celebrate his touchdown. Fans later threw Skittles onto the field after Lynch scored.

On November 6, against the Dallas Cowboys, Lynch had 135 rushing yards and a touchdown. On December 1, he had his best rushing game of the season with 148 rushing yards and two rushing touchdowns against the Philadelphia Eagles. On December 18, he set the franchise record for consecutive games with a touchdown by scoring in his tenth straight game. The previous record of nine was set by Shaun Alexander in 2005. Lynch would reach 11 consecutive games scoring a touchdown before the streak ended against the Arizona Cardinals in Week 17. Lynch led the NFL in rushing yards over the final nine weeks of the season. On January 24, 2012, Lynch was added to the NFC Pro Bowl roster to replace San Francisco 49ers running back Frank Gore. He was ranked 94th by his fellow players on the NFL Top 100 Players of 2012.

On March 4, 2012, Lynch signed a four-year, $31 million contract with the Seahawks.

==== 2012 season ====
In the second game of the 2012 season, Lynch had 122 rushing yards and a rushing touchdown in the 27–7 victory over the Dallas Cowboys. On September 30, against the St. Louis Rams, he had 118 rushing yards and touchdown in the 19–13 loss. In Weeks 7–10, he posted four consecutive games with at least 100 rushing yards and three consecutive games with a rushing touchdown. In Week 14, in a 58–0 victory over the Arizona Cardinals, he had 128 rushing yards and three rushing touchdowns. In the next game, a 50–17 victory over the Buffalo Bills, he had 113 rushing yards and a rushing touchdown. In the penultimate game of the regular season, he had 111 rushing yards and a touchdown in a 42–13 victory over the San Francisco 49ers. The Seahawks finished with an 11–5 record and made the playoffs in the 2012 season. In the Wild Card Round against the Washington Redskins, he finished with 132 rushing yards and a rushing touchdown in the 24–14 victory. In the Divisional Round against the Atlanta Falcons, he had 46 rushing yards, one rushing touchdown, and 37 receiving yards in the 30–28 loss.

Overall, Lynch started all 16 regular-season games, as well as the two playoff games the Seahawks were in. He accumulated 1,590 yards rushing on 315 attempts. He scored 11 touchdowns, his longest being a 77-yard touchdown run. He averaged 19.7 attempts per game and 99.4 yards per game, and over the course of the season, Lynch had an average of 5.05 yards per carry. He fumbled 4 times, and lost two of them. Lynch was named as a First-team All-Pro and was elected into the 2013 Pro Bowl as a reserve. He was ranked as 24th best player in the league among his peers on the NFL Top 100 Players of 2013.

==== 2013 season ====
In Week 2 of the 2013 season against the San Francisco 49ers, Lynch had 98 rushing yards and two rushing touchdowns in the 29–3 victory. In a 34–28 loss to the Indianapolis Colts on October 6, he had 102 rushing yards. On November 3 against the Tampa Bay Buccaneers, he had 125 rushing yards in the 27–24 victory. He followed that up with 145 rushing yards and a touchdown against the Atlanta Falcons. In the next game against the Minnesota Vikings, he added two more rushing touchdowns and a receiving touchdown. Overall, he was a significant contributor for the Seahawks in the 2013 season, rushing for 1,257 yards and 12 touchdowns, and recording three 100-yard games. He tied with Jamaal Charles for the league lead in rushing touchdowns. The Seattle Seahawks finished with a 13–3 record and earned a first-round bye in the playoffs. In the Divisional Round against the New Orleans Saints, he had 140 rushing yards and two rushing touchdowns in the 23–15 victory. In the NFC Championship against the San Francisco 49ers, he had 109 rushing yards and a touchdown in the 23–17 victory. He was voted to the Pro Bowl for the third straight year, but had to decline the appearance due to his participation in Super Bowl XLVIII. He ended up rushing for 39 yards on 15 carries during that game, including a one-yard rushing touchdown, resulting in the team's first Super Bowl victory by defeating the Denver Broncos 43–8. He was ranked 14th on the NFL Top 100 Players of 2014.

==== 2014 season ====
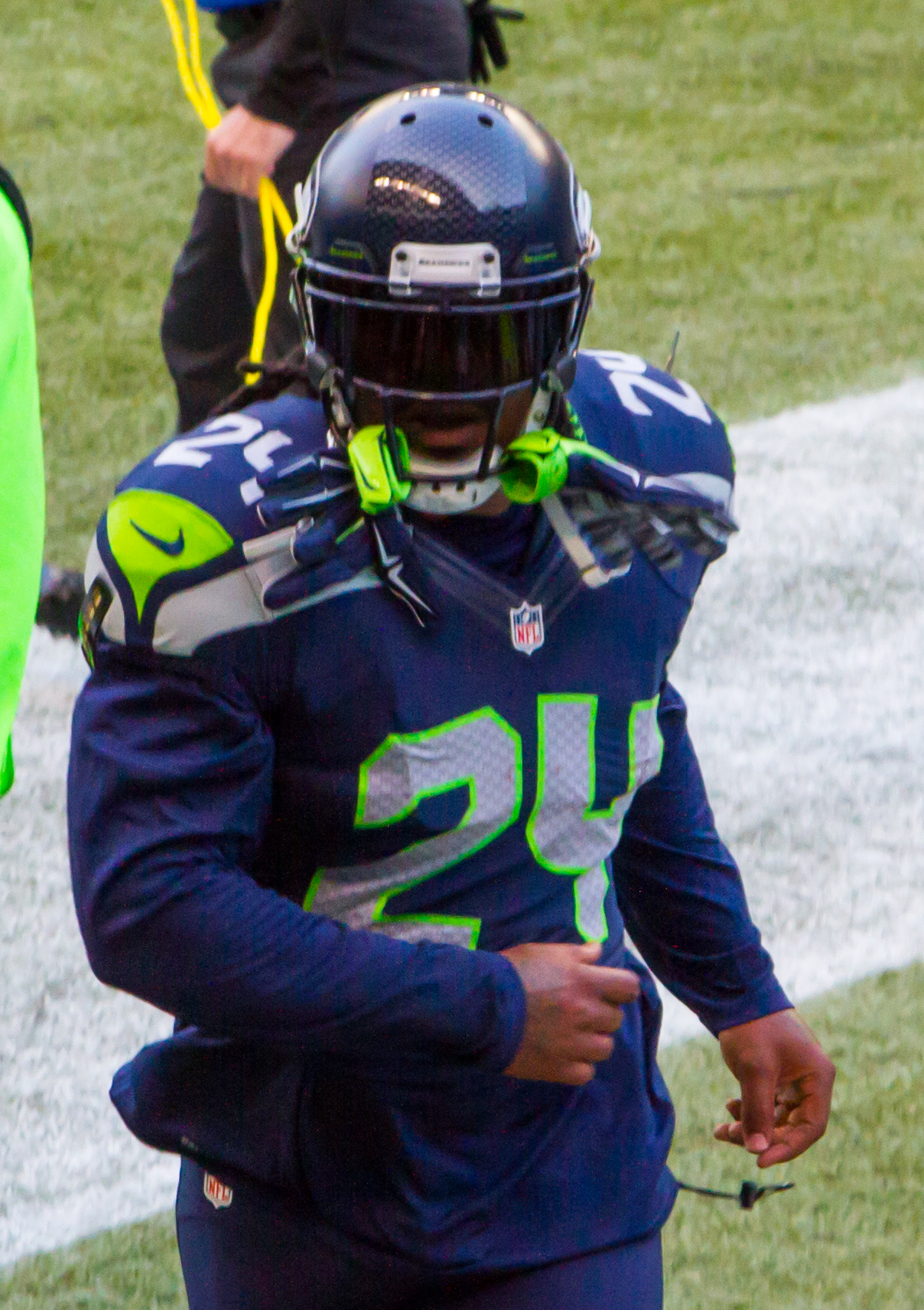
Lynch with the Seahawks in 2014

On July 24, 2014, former Seahawks fullback and good friend Michael Robinson announced on NFL Network's Inside Training Camp that Lynch would hold out of Training Camp while he waited for a restructured contract from the Seahawks. Lynch and the Seahawks quickly agreed to new terms for the season, and Lynch served as the starting running back for the team, ahead of backups Robert Turbin and Christine Michael.

In the 2014 season opener, Lynch had 110 rushing yards and two rushing touchdowns in a 36–16 victory over the Green Bay Packers. During Week 3 against the Denver Broncos, he completed the first overtime drive by rushing for a touchdown, giving the Seahawks a 26–20 victory over Denver in a Super Bowl rematch. On November 2, against the Oakland Raiders, he had 67 rushing yards, two rushing touchdowns, and 76 receiving yards. In the next game against the New York Giants, he had a stellar performance with 140 rushing yards and four rushing touchdowns in the 38–17 victory. He scored 24 total points in the game, which was tied with Jonas Gray for the most by any player in a single game in the 2014 season. He continued his successful string of games with 124 rushing yards against the Kansas City Chiefs in a loss the following week.

Lynch had a career-long 79-yard touchdown run against the Arizona Cardinals in Week 16, similar to his "Beast Quake" 67-yard scoring run in the 2011 Wild Card Round against the New Orleans Saints. Four days later, Lynch was fined $11,050 by the NFL for his celebration of the score; falling back while extending the ball behind his head and grabbing his crotch. The league considered his celebration an "obscene gesture" to constitute unsportsmanlike conduct. Lynch shared the league lead in rushing touchdowns for the second consecutive season, this time sharing with DeMarco Murray.

The Seahawks finished with a 12–4 record and earned a first round bye. He was named to the Pro Bowl for the fifth time in his career. In the Divisional Round against the Carolina Panthers, he had 59 rushing yards in the 31–17 victory. He contributed heavily to a late comeback in the NFC Championship against the Green Bay Packers in a rematch of the season-opener, catching a 26-yard pass to set up one touchdown and later scoring a touchdown of his own on a 24-yard run. The Seahawks won 28–22 in overtime after trailing 19–7 with less than four minutes remaining in the game. His 157 rushing yards in the game were a career postseason high for Lynch, as were his 183 total yards from scrimmage.

Lynch made headlines at Super Bowl XLIX Media Day on January 27, 2015, when he held a five-minute press conference, only answering "I'm just here so I won't get fined" to every question. He has a history of unwillingness to talk to the media.

In Super Bowl XLIX, where the Seahawks lost 28–24 to the New England Patriots, Lynch had 24 carries for 102 yards and a touchdown, plus a catch for 31 yards. Late in the fourth quarter on a potential game-winning drive, Lynch ran the ball from the five yard line but was tackled by Dont'a Hightower at the one-yard line. On the next offensive play of the game, the Seahawks chose to pass the ball at the one-yard line instead of running it with Lynch, and Russell Wilson's pass was intercepted by Malcolm Butler. Lynch was visibly upset by the decision and left the Seahawks locker room without addressing the media. He stated in a later interview with Conan O'Brien that he was "expecting the ball" prior to the play. He was ranked ninth by his fellow players on the NFL Top 100 Players of 2015.

==== 2015 season ====
On March 6, 2015, the Seahawks and Lynch agreed to a 2-year, $24 million contract extension. Lynch struggled to pile up yardage early in the season but starred in Week 7 in a 20–3 win over the rival San Francisco 49ers, against whom he racked up 122 yards and a touchdown on 27 carries. Midway through the 2015 season, Lynch needed to have sports hernia surgery. Lynch's backup, undrafted rookie Thomas Rawls, had a 209-yard game against the 49ers in Week 11.

Ahead of the Seahawks Wild Card Round matchup against the Minnesota Vikings, Lynch was anticipated to make his return, but decided to stay behind in Seattle, stating that he felt that he could not play. Seattle went on to win, 10–9. Lynch made his return from injury against the Carolina Panthers in the Divisional Round, carrying only six times for 20 yards, and caught two passes for 15 yards in the 31–24 loss.

=== Initial retirement ===
On February 7, 2016, the day of Super Bowl 50, Lynch announced his retirement via Twitter by posting a picture of his football cleats hanging from a telephone wire. He subsequently became a mentor to the current college football players at Cal.

After his retirement, rumors circulated about Lynch returning to the NFL. In early April 2017, after sitting out the 2016 season, it was reported Lynch had agreed to terms with his hometown Oakland Raiders and that the Seahawks, who retained his rights even after retirement, would trade him. Lynch said he was inspired to come out of retirement by the team's impending move to Las Vegas saying that he wanted children currently growing up in Oakland to be able to see a home-grown football star play for the Raiders before the team is gone.

=== Oakland Raiders ===
On April 26, 2017, Lynch officially passed his physical and was traded to the Oakland Raiders along with Seattle's sixth-round draft pick for Oakland's fifth-round selection in the 2018 NFL draft. Lynch signed a two-year, $9 million contract with a maximum of $16.5 million; it had a $2 million bonus for 1,000 rushing yards for the season.

==== 2017 season ====
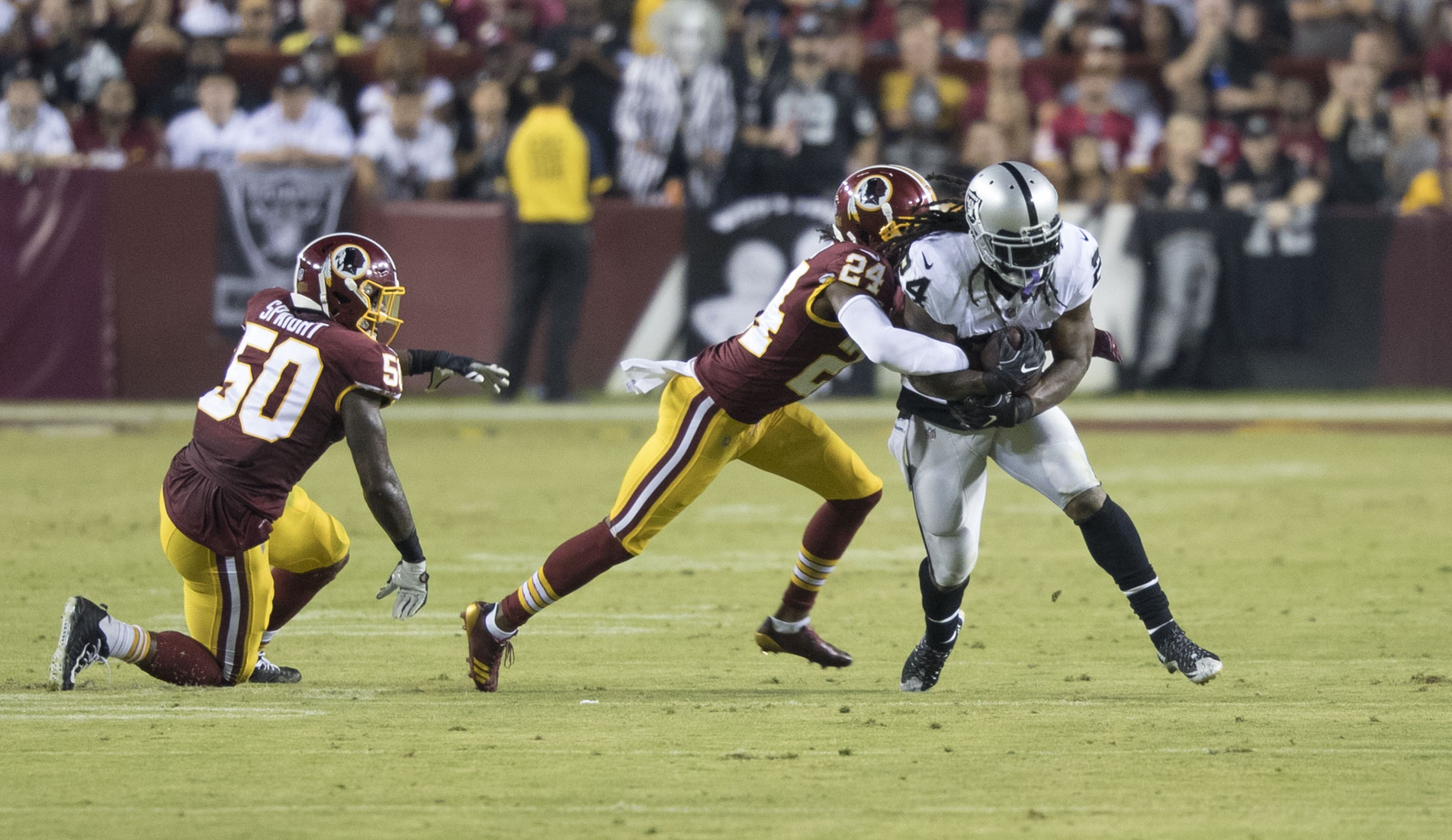
Lynch playing for the Raiders in 2017

In the Raiders' regular-season opener on the road against the Tennessee Titans, Lynch finished with 18 carries for 76 rushing yards along with one reception for 16 yards in a 26–16 win. On September 14, Lynch was fined $12,000 for doing an obscene gesture. In Week 2 against the New York Jets, he had his first touchdown as a Raider, which was a two-yard rush in the second quarter, in the 45–20 victory. During Thursday Night Football against the Kansas City Chiefs in Week Seven, Lynch was ejected for running onto the field and shoving an official following a hit by Chiefs cornerback Marcus Peters on Raiders quarterback Derek Carr. The next day, the NFL suspended Lynch for one game. Lynch attempted to appeal, but the suspension was upheld. During Sunday Night Football against the Dallas Cowboys in Week 15, Lynch confronted officials about Derek Carr not scoring while a fumble and touchback occurred; on December 21, Lynch was fined $24,309.

During the regular-season finale, in a loss against the Los Angeles Chargers, Lynch became the 31st player in NFL history to rush for over 10,000 rushing yards. Overall, in the 2017 season, he finished with 207 carries for 891 rushing yards and seven rushing touchdowns to go along with 20 receptions for 151 receiving yards.

==== 2018 season ====
Lynch returned to the Raiders' backfield for the 2018 season opener under new head coach Jon Gruden. He recorded a rushing touchdown in the first three games of the season against the Los Angeles Rams, Denver Broncos, and Miami Dolphins, all losses for the Raiders. In Week 4, he recorded 20 carries for 130 rushing yards in the 45–42 overtime victory over the Cleveland Browns. On October 22, Lynch was placed on injured reserve with a groin injury. Overall, he finished the 2018 season with 90 carries for 376 rushing yards and three rushing touchdowns in six games. After the 2018 season, Lynch's plans were to not play football again and retire.

=== Seattle Seahawks (second stint) ===
Lynch returned to the NFL during the final week of the 2019 regular season, signing with the Seahawks alongside former teammate Robert Turbin on December 23, 2019, after Seattle lost three running backs to injury. Lynch made his return to the Seahawks in Week 17 against the San Francisco 49ers on NBC Sunday Night Football. During the game, Lynch rushed 12 times for 34 yards and a touchdown in the 26–21 loss. After his touchdown, fans threw Skittles onto the field. During the Seahawks' 17–9 win over the Philadelphia Eagles in the Wild Card Round of the playoffs, Lynch broke a tackle to score a five-yard, first half touchdown. In the Divisional Round against the Green Bay Packers, Lynch rushed 12 times for 26 yards and two touchdowns during the 28–23 loss.

With his three additional playoff touchdowns in the 2019–20 NFL playoffs, Lynch moved into fourth place on the all-time postseason rushing touchdowns list. He is tied with Terrell Davis and John Riggins with 12.

During a postgame interview on January 12, 2020, Lynch was asked if he'll return for the Seahawks in the 2020 NFL season. "I mean, shoot," he responded, "We'll see what's happening." In media ahead of the 2020 NFL Scouting Combine, Seahawks head coach Pete Carroll was also asked about Lynch returning and said "We'll see. You never know." Lynch was named to the Pro Football Hall of Fame All-2010s Team.

In a December 2020 interview with Conan O'Brien, Lynch said that teams had expressed interest in signing him and that he was willing to sign with a team that is a Super Bowl contender.

== Career statistics ==
Legend
	Won the Super Bowl
	Led the league
**Bold**	Career high

=== NFL ===
==== Regular season ====
Year	Team	Games		Rushing					Receiving					Fumbles	
Year	Team	GP	GS	Att	Yds	Avg	Lng	TD	Rec	Yds	Avg	Lng	TD	Fum	Lost
2007	BUF	13	13	280	1,115	4.0	56T	7	18	184	**10.2**	30	0	2	1
2008	BUF	15	15	250	1,036	4.1	50	8	**47**	300	6.4	42	1	2	1
2009	BUF	13	6	120	450	3.8	47	2	28	179	6.4	35	0	3	1
2010	BUF	4	3	37	164	4.4	17	0	1	7	7.0	7	0	1	1
2010	SEA	12	11	165	573	3.5	39	6	21	138	6.6	22	0	3	**3**
2011	SEA	15	15	285	1,204	4.2	47	12	28	212	7.6	26	1	3	2
2012	SEA	16	15	**315**	**1,590**	**5.0**	77T	11	23	196	8.5	27	1	**5**	2
2013	SEA	16	16	301	1,257	4.2	43	12	36	316	8.8	**55**	2	4	1
2014	SEA	16	14	280	1,306	4.7	**79T**	**13**	37	**367**	9.9	39	**4**	3	2
2015	SEA	7	6	111	417	3.8	24	3	13	80	6.2	19	0	0	0
2017	OAK	15	15	207	891	4.3	51T	7	20	151	7.6	25	0	1	1
2018	OAK	6	6	90	376	4.2	52	3	15	84	5.6	17	0	0	0
2019	SEA	1	0	12	34	2.8	15	1	0	0	0.0	0	0	0	0
Career		149	135	2,453	10,413	4.2	79T	85	287	2,214	7.7	55	9	27	15

==== Postseason ====
Year	Team	Games		Rushing					Receiving					Fumbles	
Year	Team	GP	GS	Att	Yds	Avg	Lng	TD	Rec	Yds	Avg	Lng	TD	Fum	Lost
2010	SEA	2	0	23	133	**5.8**	**67T**	1	0	0	0	0	0	0	0
2012	SEA	2	2	36	178	4.9	27	2	4	46	11.5	24	0	**2**	**2**
2013	SEA	3	3	**65**	288	4.4	40	**4**	1	3	3.0	3	0	0	0
2014	SEA	3	3	63	**318**	5.0	25	2	**5**	**63**	**12.6**	**31**	0	1	1
2015	SEA	1	1	6	20	3.3	9	0	2	15	7.5	11	0	0	0
2019	SEA	2	1	18	33	1.8	5T	3	2	25	12.5	20	0	0	0
Career		13	10	211	970	4.6	67T	12	14	152	10.9	31	0	3	3

=== College ===
Season	Team	Games		Rushing					Receiving					Kickoff returns				
Season	Team	GP	GS	Att	Yds	Avg	Lng	TD	Rec	Yds	Avg	Lng	TD	Ret	Yds	Avg	Lng	TD
2004	California	12	0	71	628	**8.8**	70	8	19	147	7.7	**29**	2	**15**	**372**	**24.8**	**69**	0
2005	California	10	9	196	1,246	6.4	52	10	15	125	8.3	25	0	13	271	20.8	34	0
2006	California	13	11	**223**	**1,356**	6.1	**71**	**11**	**34**	**328**	**9.6**	28	**4**	5	101	20.2	27	0
Career		35	20	490	3,230	6.6	71	29	68	600	8.8	29	6	33	744	22.5	69	0

== Career highlights ==
=== Awards and honors ===
NFL

- Super Bowl champion (XLVIII)
- First-team All-Pro (2012)
- Second-team All-Pro (2014)
- 5× Pro Bowl (2008, 2011–2014)
- 2× NFL rushing touchdowns leader (2013, 2014)
- NFL 2010s All-Decade Team
- Seattle Seahawks Top 50 players
- PFWA All-Rookie Team (2007)
- 4× NFL Top 100 — 94th (2012), 24th (2013), 14th (2014), 9th (2015)

College

- First-team All-American (2006)
- Pac-10 Offensive Player of the Year (2006)
- First-team All-Pac-10 (2006)
- Holiday Bowl Co-Offensive MVP (2006)
- Las Vegas Bowl MVP (2005)

=== Seahawks franchise records ===
- Most rushing attempts (playoff career): 211
- Most rushing attempts (playoff season): 65 (2013)
- Most rushing yards (playoff career): 970
- Most rushing yards (playoff season): 318 (2014)
- Most rushing yards per attempt (minimum ten carries) (playoff game): 6.89 (January 8, 2011, against the New Orleans Saints)
- Most rushing touchdowns (game): 4 (November 9, 2014, against the New York Giants; tied with Curt Warner and Shaun Alexander – 3×)
- Most rushing touchdowns (playoff career): 12
- Most rushing touchdowns (playoff season): 4 (2013)
- Most rushing yards per game (playoff season): 106 (2014)
- Most total touchdowns (playoff career): 12
- Most total touchdowns (playoff season): 4 (2013)
- Most yards from scrimmage (playoff career): 1,122
- Most yards from scrimmage (playoff season): 381 (2014)
- Most yards from scrimmage (playoff game): 183 (January 18, 2015, against the Green Bay Packers)
- Most all purpose yards (playoff career): 1,122
- Most all purpose yards (playoff season): 381 (2014)
- Most 100+ yard rushing games (playoffs): 6
- Most games with at least one touchdown scored (playoffs): 7

== Filmography ==
=== Film ===
Year	Title	Role	Notes
2023	80 for Brady	Himself	Cameo
2023	Bottoms	Mr. G	Nominated – Independent Spirit Award for Best Breakthrough Performance
2024	Freaky Tales	Bus driver	
2025	Love Hurts	King	
2025	The Pickup	Chop Shop	
2025	Eenie Meanie	Perm Walters	
2025	Signing Tony Raymond	Eugene Ledford	
2026	He Bled Neon		
2026	Livestream from Hell	Himself	
2026	Madden	Jerry Bell	

=== Television ===
Year	Title	Role	Notes
2014–2015	The League	Himself	2 episodes
2016	Running Wild with Bear Grylls	Himself	Filmed on Corsica
2017	Brooklyn Nine-Nine	Himself	Episode: "The Fugitive Part 1"
2017	No Script with Marshawn Lynch	Himself	8 Episodes
2019	Real Time with Bill Maher	Himself	Season 17 Episode 1
2020	Westworld	Giggles	3 episodes
2020	Bar Rescue	Himself	Featuring his own sports bar Rob Ben's in Emeryville, California. Episode: "Beast Rescue"
2022	Murderville	Himself	2 episodes
2022	The Great American Baking Show	Himself	Season 6 Contestants
2023	Stars on Mars	Himself	Cast Member
2024	Lopez vs Lopez	Marshawn	Episode: "Lopez vs Raider Nation"
2026	Euphoria	G	7 episodes

== Beast Mode ==
The nickname "Beast Mode" became a popular way to refer to Lynch and his style of play. While the term was in use since 1996 with the debut of the animated Transformers series Beast Wars, Lynch claims it developed as his nickname because one of his childhood coaches would refer to him as a beast. He also claimed on an episode of the Politickin' podcast that the nickname draws inspiration from a 2008 song of the same name by Boosie.

Lynch has since developed the nickname into his Beast Mode brand, which includes an apparel line, retail store, and at least one partnership with international brands. The first Beast Mode store opened in Oakland, California on February 7, 2016, during Super Bowl 50. On April 8, 2015, rapper Ludacris released the video for his single "Beast Mode," named after Lynch, who appears in the video. Ludacris mimics Lynch's interview at the Super Bowl media day by saying "I'm just here so I won't get fined" to reporters before Lynch comes in and adds "You know why we here". Lynch makes a cameo in the video game Call of Duty: Black Ops III. He also appeared in the fourth episode of the sixth season of Tanked where they created a special fish tank for "BeastMode" first aired June 19, 2015. He is featured in the game Predator: Hunting Grounds as the playable character "Dante 'Beast Mode' Jefferson".

Lynch was approached by former Pro BMX rider Todd Lyons, who noticed that Lynch rode his BMX products. Lyons, acting as the current brand manager for SE Bikes BMX company, partnered with Marshawn to create a Beast Mode Ripper: an adult-sized BMX bike with customized Beast Mode branding as a 2018 SE Bicycle.

On September 19, 2017, Lynch launched his own ad-supported Beast Mobile cellphone service that allows subscribers to pay their phone bill by engaging in ads and offers.

== Indoor football teams ==
In November 2018, Lynch and Richard Sherman were announced as the first two team owners in a proposed Fan Controlled Football League, a concept based on Project Fanchise's use of a mobile app for fans to call plays for the team that they had initiated with the Salt Lake Screaming Eagles of the Indoor Football League (IFL) a year earlier. The league was delayed and eventually played its first game, rebranded as just Fan Controlled Football (FCF), in February 2021 with Lynch as one of three owners of a team called the Beasts. Lynch dressed for the game, but decided not to play.

In 2019, Lynch was also announced as co-owner of the Oakland Panthers of the Indoor Football League (IFL) alongside Roy Choi, who also owns the IFL's Cedar Rapids River Kings and San Diego Strike Force. Introduced to Choi by his brother Davonte Sapp-Lynch who plays in the IFL, Lynch saw the indoor football team as a way to keep professional football in Oakland after the departure of the Raiders for Las Vegas. Davonte Sapp-Lynch was one of the first players the Panthers signed. The Panthers were to start playing in the 2020 season, but it was cancelled after the opening week due to the COVID-19 pandemic. The Panthers also went dormant for the 2021 season.

== NFLPA brand chief ambassador ==
In October 2021, Lynch was named the first NFLPA brand chief ambassador.

== Personal life ==
Lynch has several relatives who have also played professional football. His cousins are wide receiver Robert Jordan, who played alongside Lynch at Cal from 2004 to 2006, journeyman quarterback Josh Johnson, and quarterback JaMarcus Russell. Lynch's uncle, Lorenzo Lynch, had an eleven-year career in the NFL.

While in Buffalo, Lynch embraced the Buffalo community, in stark contrast to former Bills running back Willis McGahee, as noted in an interview with ESPN's Kenny Mayne. In the video interview, which has become an internet sensation, Lynch talks about his love of Applebee's and his teammates joke that he loves chain restaurants. Lynch is also known for his frequent community involvement. In 2013, he was featured in Red Bull's campaign "Athletes Give Back" when he put together a successful food drive for his hometown. During his first stint in Seattle, Lynch once gave his backpack to junior teammate Doug Baldwin after Baldwin had inquired where he got it from. When the Seahawks defensive coordinator Ken Norton Jr.'s father died, Lynch was the only member of the organization who went to console him at the airport. In 2014, he found a lost wallet outside Seattle at a gas station; Lynch went to the address to return it.

Lynch frequently ate Skittles during games, a habit that started when he was in high school. After Lynch was shown eating the candy during a nationally televised game on December 5, 2011, Mars offered him a two-year supply of Skittles and a custom dispenser for his locker. On December 30, 2011, he was fined $10,000 for wearing cleats featuring a Skittles pattern. On January 28, 2014, an official deal with Skittles was announced. The agreement stated that in addition to personal compensation, $10,000 would be donated to his Fam 1st Foundation for each touchdown he scored in Super Bowl XLVIII.

Lynch also has an affinity for purchasing grills, saying he has been wearing the gold jewelry since his junior year in high school. After the 2011 season, Lynch purchased a customized Seahawks grill in time for the 2012 season.

Lynch is an entrepreneur in the cannabis industry, launching a line of cannabis products in 2021 under the brand name Dodi Blunts. The company distributes blunts to dispensaries throughout the Bay Area, with a portion of the proceeds going to Last Prisoner Project, a drug policy reform group. Lynch says he has been a long-time consumer of cannabis and that it helped him deal with pain during his football career.

In April 2021, Lynch joined the ownership group of the Oakland Roots SC of the USL Championship. In the same month, he also joined the PFL as a brand ambassador and investor. On April 18, 2022, the Seattle Kraken of the National Hockey League (NHL) announced that Lynch had joined its ownership group.

In November 2021, Lynch was revealed as an investor in PORTL Inc., the holoportation startup, as part of its $12M Series A round. Other investors included Tim Draper, Quavo of Migos, Albert Pujols, Breanna Stewart, and Luke Walton.

Lynch started his own charitable foundation called the Fam 1st Foundation in 2006 to give back to his hometown of Oakland, California.

In August 2025, Lynch purchased a minority interest in a thoroughbred racehorse, acquiring a stake in 2024 American Horse of the Year Thorpedo Anna.

=== Legal troubles ===
In June 2008, Lynch pled guilty to a hit-and-run charge and had his driver's license revoked. Lynch was driving his 2008 Porsche Cayenne at 3:30 a.m. through Buffalo's bar district when he struck a woman in the street and failed to stop. When questioned, Lynch stated, "I didn't know my car had hit anyone or anything."

The California Highway Patrol arrested Lynch for driving under the influence (DUI) on July 14, 2012, after he was observed driving erratically. He was reported to have registered a blood-alcohol level of 0.10 on a breathalyzer at the Alameda County Sheriff's Office North County Jail in Oakland. He was incarcerated hours before hosting a youth football camp. A motion to dismiss the case was denied in November 2013, but in December the trial date was pushed back until after the NFL season. Lynch's attorney, Ivan Golde, accused the police of bending the truth and changing stories to try to convict Lynch. The case was settled in February 2014 when Lynch pleaded guilty to a lesser charge of reckless driving. Lynch received two years of probation and a $1,033 fine, and had to attend drivers' safety classes, but did not have his license suspended.

On August 9, 2022, Las Vegas Metropolitan Police Department officers arrested Lynch on suspicion of DUI near the Las Vegas Strip. The police report stated that Lynch was found asleep in a parked car that had noticeable damage. Lynch was charged with driving under the influence, as well as three other crimes. He posted bail of $3,381 and was released. Lynch's lawyers disputed the charges.

=== Press interviews ===
Lynch is known for being reluctant to talk to the media. He was fined $50,000 by the NFL for refusing to talk to the media throughout the 2013 NFL season, which inspired fans of the Seattle Seahawks to fundraise that amount. However, the fine was subsequently pulled back in an agreement that he would be fined another $50,000 if he broke the same rule, after which he donated the money raised by Seahawks fans to pay his fine to charity. Lynch was fined $100,000 on November 19, 2014, for once again refusing to speak to the media. A few days later, after the Seahawks' win over Arizona, he answered nearly every question from reporters with "Yeah". On December 21, 2014, after the second Seahawks–Cardinals game, he answered nearly every question from reporters with some version of "Thanks for asking" or "I appreciate you asking." The only people to get an "extended interview" were Deion Sanders, former teammate turned analyst Michael Robinson, and Michael Silver, in which they discovered his reluctance came from his upbringing and the fact that he felt that he was "forced to do something". On January 27, 2015, during Super Bowl Media Day in Glendale, Arizona, Lynch continued the trend of declining to give detailed media interviews by showing up for five minutes, and answering every question with some variation of "I'm just here so I won't get fined," and the following day "You know why I'm here."

=== In popular culture ===
Four days before Super Bowl XLIX, Lynch appeared in a guest segment on Conan, playing a head-to-head game of the then-unreleased Mortal Kombat X against prospective Super Bowl opponent tight end Rob Gronkowski. Contrary to his media appearances earlier that week, Lynch appeared upbeat and loquacious, discussing his fondness of Mario Kart and explaining his touchdown celebration moves. The video went viral, was widely covered in media, and gathered about 8 million views before the Super Bowl. Lynch re-appeared on the show prior to Super Bowl LI along with Gronkowski, Tom Brady, LeGarrette Blount, and Dwight Freeney playing the game For Honor.

Lynch appeared as himself, in an episode of Brooklyn Nine-Nine in 2017. In the episode "The Fugitive", Lynch is an eyewitness to a convict escape and goes to the station to give his statement. The show references his reluctance to talk to the press during his NFL days, and Detective Rosa Diaz says of Lynch, "There are some vaults you just can't open." Lynch goes on to talk nonstop to the team.

The 2019 documentary film Marshawn Lynch: A History explores the roots of Lynch's reticence.

Lynch appeared as himself alongside Will Arnett in an episode of Murderville, a comedic murder-mystery streaming television series released by Netflix in February 2022. Within the episode, Lynch improvises alongside Arnett and attempts to solve a fictional murder mystery.

Lynch appeared on The Great American Baking Show in 2022.

Lynch played a high school teacher in the 2023 teen comedy Bottoms. In December 2023, Lynch appeared on Lego Masters second installment of its "Celebrity Holiday Bricktacular", teaming up with contestant Dave Guedes.

On May 13, 2024, Lynch appeared on Ian's "Figure It Out" music video.

In July 2024, Lynch began co-hosting the Politickin' podcast alongside California governor Gavin Newsom and sports agent Doug Hendrickson. In the podcast, they cover various topics that are mostly unrelated to politics, and interview celebrities from many different industries. In an October 10 episode entitled "Mayor Beastmode", the hosts focused on the idea of Lynch running for mayor of Oakland. Lynch did not confirm his intention to run, but did indicate that he was serious in considering it.

In 2026, Lynch can be seen in season three of Euphoria, portraying G, one of the men working for Alamo Brown, played by Adewale Akinnuoye-Agbaje.

== See also ==
- Beastro (restaurant)
- List of athletes who came out of retirement
- List of NFL annual rushing touchdowns leaders
- List of NFL career rushing yards leaders
- List of NFL career rushing touchdowns leaders
