= Robert Jordan (American football) =

American gridiron football player (born 1986)

No. 11
- Position: Wide receiver

Personal information
- Born: January 29, 1986 (age 40); Oakland, California, U.S.
- Listed height: 5 ft 11 in (1.80 m)
- Listed weight: 171 lb (78 kg)

Career information
- High school: Hayward (CA)
- College: California
- NFL draft: 2008: undrafted

Career history
- San Francisco 49ers (2008)*; British Columbia Lions (2010); Florida Tarpons (2012)
- * Offseason or practice squad member only

Career CFL statistics
- Rush attempts: 4
- Rushing yards: 22
- Return yards: 136
- Stats at CFL.ca (archived)

Robert Jordan (born January 29, 1986) is an American former professional football wide receiver who played for the BC Lions of the Canadian Football League (CFL), and the Florida Tarpons of the Indoor Football League

== College career ==
Jordan played college football for the California Golden Bears. Jordan set the University of California record for consecutive games with receptions with 42 and started more games at 37 than any other player on the 2007 team. He attended Hayward High School in Hayward, California.

== Professional career ==
=== San Francisco 49ers ===
Jordan signed a free agent contract with the National Football League San Francisco 49ers on April 28, 2008.

On July 29, 2008, Jordan was released from the San Francisco 49ers (upon his own personal decision), so that he could tend to a death in his family. Ex-head coach Mike Nolan was reported saying that he wanted to bring the un-drafted rookie back some time in the near future so that he may attend practice squad.

=== British Columbia Lions ===
On April 13, 2010, Jordan signed with the British Columbia Lions. On July 26, 2010, he was released by the Lions.

=== Florida Tarpons ===
On August 15, 2011, Jordan signed with the Florida Tarpons.

== Personal ==
He is the cousin of former Cal running back and former Seattle Seahawks player Marshawn Lynch, Baltimore Ravens quarterback Josh Johnson and former Oakland Raiders quarterback JaMarcus Russell.
