= Eric Stevens =

American football player (born 1989)

No. 47
- Position: Fullback

Personal information
- Born: October 1, 1989 (age 37)
- Listed height: 6 ft 0 in (1.83 m)
- Listed weight: 241 lb (109 kg)

Career information
- High school: Palos Verdes Peninsula High School
- College: California
- NFL draft: 2013: undrafted

Career history
- St. Louis Rams (2013)*
- * Offseason or practice squad member only
- Stats at Pro Football Reference

Eric James Stevens (born October 1, 1989) is an American former football fullback. He played college football for the University of California, Berkeley. The St. Louis Rams signed him as an undrafted free agent in 2013. He is the brother of former NFL tight end Craig Stevens.

Following his football career, Stevens joined the Los Angeles Fire Department as a firefighter. After only a few short years in the department, he was diagnosed with amyotrophic lateral sclerosis.

== Early life ==
Stevens was selected first-team All-Bay League and to the Daily Breeze All-Area squad as a 2007 senior when he recorded 110 tackles and 7.0 tackles for loss, while also averaging 30.0 yards per catch on 14 receptions (three touchdowns) for a total of 420 receiving yards. He also added All-Bay League honors in wrestling.

== College career ==
Stevens played in 35 games with 10 starts during his five seasons with the program from 2008 to 2012 that included a full season out of action due to injury in 2011 and another in which he did not play when he redshirted as a true freshman in 2008. He contributed 14 rushes for 53 yards, nine catches for 55 yards and a touchdown and one kick return for 11 yards as he totaled 146 all purpose yards and made 12 tackles on special teams. As a senior in 2012, he played in 12 games with five starts at fullback after missing the entire 2011 season and 2012 spring practices due to a knee injury suffered during training camp in 2011. He posted career bests with 13 rushes for 51 yards and nine receptions for 55 yards, with his rushing numbers both fifth on the team. In 2011, he missed the entire season after injuring his knee during training camp. In 2010 Stevens was the team's top fullback, playing in 11 games and starting five. In 2009, he was primarily on special teams and also as a backup fullback. In 2008, he redshirted and did not play.

== Professional career ==
Pre-draft measurables
Height	Weight	40-yard dash	10-yard split	20-yard split	20-yard shuttle	Three-cone drill	Vertical jump	Broad jump	Bench press	Wonderlic
5 ft 11 3/4 in (1.82 m)	240 lb (109 kg)	4.72 s	1.64 s	2.72 s	4.33 s	7.28 s	31 in (0.79 m)	9 ft 3 in (2.82 m)	25 reps	x
All values from NFL Combine except 10, 20 40-yard dash and VJ which were from Pro Day

Stevens was signed by the St. Louis Rams as an undrafted free agent on May 7, 2013. He was waived during final roster cuts on August 31, 2013, and signed to the team's practice squad two days later. He was released on October 1, 2013.

== ALS diagnosis and viral campaign ==
One month after marrying his wife Amanda, Stevens was diagnosed with ALS in August 2019. In an effort to raise awareness and funds to receive access to NurOwn, an experimental ALS treatment yet to be approved by the FDA, his family started the #axeALS campaign. Fire stations around the country began posting images on social media holding up signs with the tag. Though the trend only started with fire stations, supporters of Stevens began posting their own #axeALS images, and it became a viral challenge. On November 11, 2019, Stevens appeared on The Ellen DeGeneres Show, where his fire department surprised him with a $50,000 donation to his treatment. On April 5, 2023, Eric and Amanda Stevens credited Eric's retention of his ability to walk, talk, and eat four years after his diagnosis to NurOwn.
