= Jim Michalczik =

American football player and coach (born 1966)

Biographical details
- Born: June 7, 1966 (age 59); Port Angeles, Washington, U.S.

Playing career
- 1984–1988: Washington State
- 1989: Arizona Cardinals
- Position: Offensive guard

Coaching career (HC unless noted)
- 1990–1991: Miami (FL) (DL)
- 1992–1998: Montana State (OL)
- 1999–2001: Oregon State (OL/TE/ST)
- 2002–2008: California (assistant HC/OL)
- 2009–2010: Oakland Raiders (OL)
- 2011–2013: California (OC/OL)
- 2013–2017: Arizona (OL)
- 2018–2023: Oregon State (Associate HC/RGC/OL)
- 2024–2025: Michigan State (Associate HC/RGC/OL)

James Max Michalczik (born June 6, 1966) in an American football coach who was most recently the offensive line coach for the Michigan State Spartans. He was previously the offensive line coach with the California Golden Bears from 2002 to 2008, offensive coordinator/offensive line coach from 2011 to 2013, offensive line coach with the Arizona Wildcats from 2014 to 2017 and offensive line coach with Oregon State 2018–2023. He was the offensive line coach for the Oakland Raiders from 2009 to 2010.

On January 16, 2013, Arizona hired Michalczik as offensive line coach.
