= Zack Follett =

American football player (born 1987)

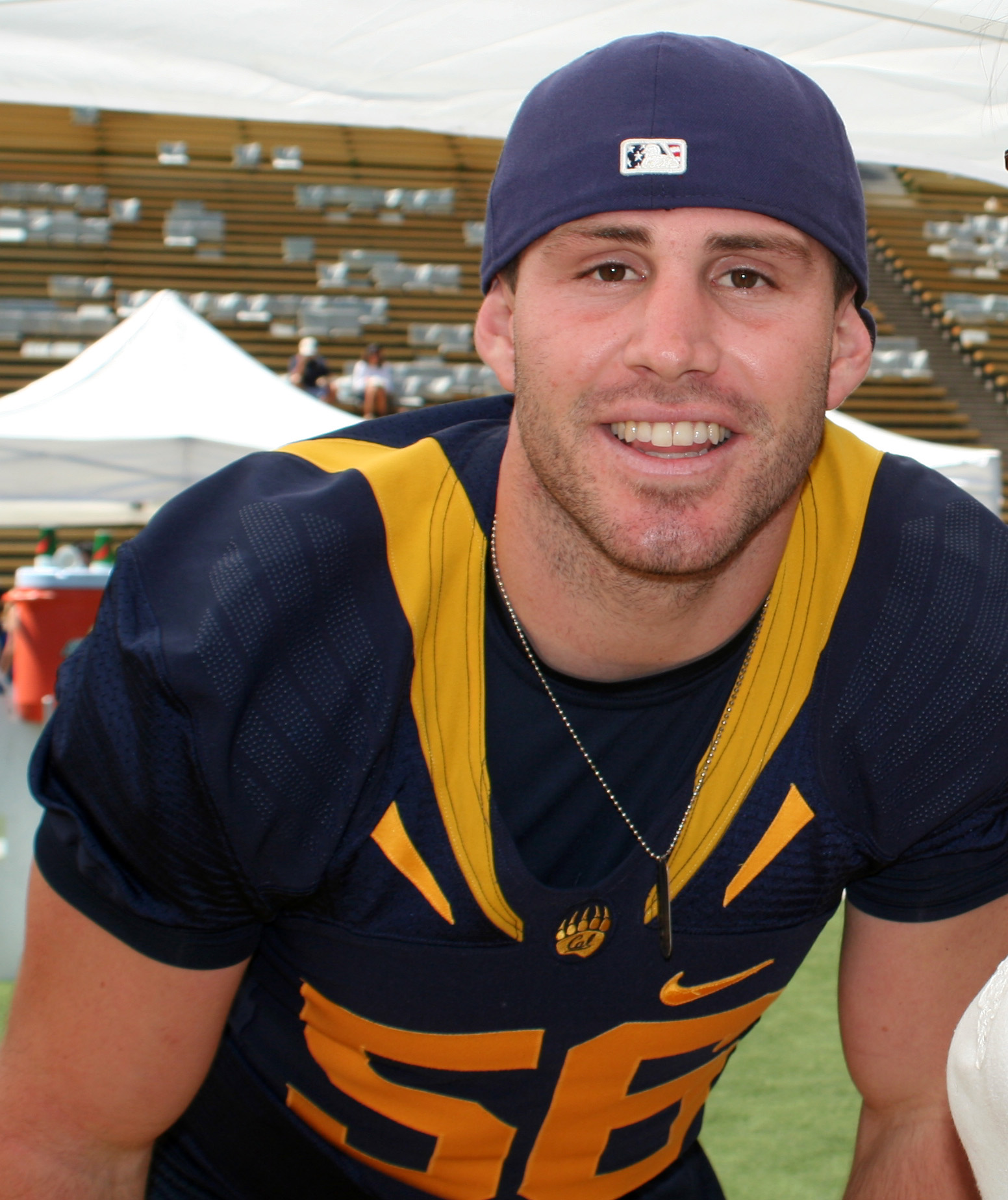
- Follett in 2008

No. 49
- Position: Linebacker

Personal information
- Born: July 3, 1987 (age 39); Clovis, California, U.S.
- Listed height: 6 ft 1 in (1.85 m)
- Listed weight: 236 lb (107 kg)

Career information
- High school: Clovis
- College: California
- NFL draft: 2009: 7th round, 235th overall pick

Career history
- Detroit Lions (2009–2010)

Awards and highlights
- First-team All-Pac-10 (2008); Second-team All-Pac-10 (2007); 2008 Emerald Bowl Defensive MVP

Career NFL statistics
- Total tackles: 31
- Fumble recoveries: 1
- Pass deflections: 1
- Stats at Pro Football Reference

Zachary Follett (born July 3, 1987) is an American former professional football player who was a linebacker for the Detroit Lions of the National Football League (NFL). He was selected by the Lions in the seventh round of the 2009 NFL draft. He played college football for the California Golden Bears.

== College career ==
Follett began his career in football at the University of California, Berkeley, as a middle linebacker for the Golden Bears. He switched over to weak-side linebacker as a sophomore and then eventually to strong-side linebacker as a junior. He started 24 of 49 games over the course of his career and finished 10th on California's tackle list with 245. He set a school record and tied the Pac-10 Conference record for forced fumbles with 13. He finished fifth at California in stops behind the line of scrimmage with 51.0. Included in that total were 23.5 sacks which put him in sixth place on the school's career sacks list. Follett represented California at the 2009 Senior Bowl.

== Professional career ==
Follett was selected 235th overall in the seventh round by the Detroit Lions in the 2009 NFL draft. Follett was released by the Lions during the preseason cuts on September 5, 2009. A day later, he was signed to the team's practice squad. He was activated from the practice squad on October 6, 2009, to help on special teams and made his NFL debut against the Pittsburgh Steelers. His first NFL tackle was on Danny Amendola of the St. Louis Rams, which was named hit of the week by the NFL Network.

On October 17, 2010, Follett was injured while covering a kickoff return against the New York Giants and had to be removed from the field. After the game the team released a statement saying "There is no evidence at this point of a fracture of the cervical spine. He has movement in all four extremities. Zack will remain here tonight and will continue to undergo extensive tests and evaluation." Follett was placed on injured reserve, ending his season.

On August 2, 2011, Follett was released by the Lions.

== Post-playing career ==
On November 7, 2011, Follett joined the Channel 4 broadcast team in London for its Sunday night coverage of the NFL. He was in England for a brief visit to preach as part of a Christian mission and to work with youths and to publicize American football. For the next two Sundays he joined the Sky Sports broadcast team for its coverage of the NFL.

Zack joined the Sky Sports broadcast team again January 7–8, 2012, for its coverage of the NFL Wild Card Weekend.

== Personal life ==
Zack is the son of Naomi and Bob Follett. He graduated with a major in American Studies. Zack, and his dog Zakarian, have been featured on Animal Planet's Dogs 101. Zack currently resides in Fresno, California, where he owns a chain of coffee shops called Kuppa Joy, located in the greater Fresno area.
