= Craig Stevens (American football) =

American football player (born 1984)

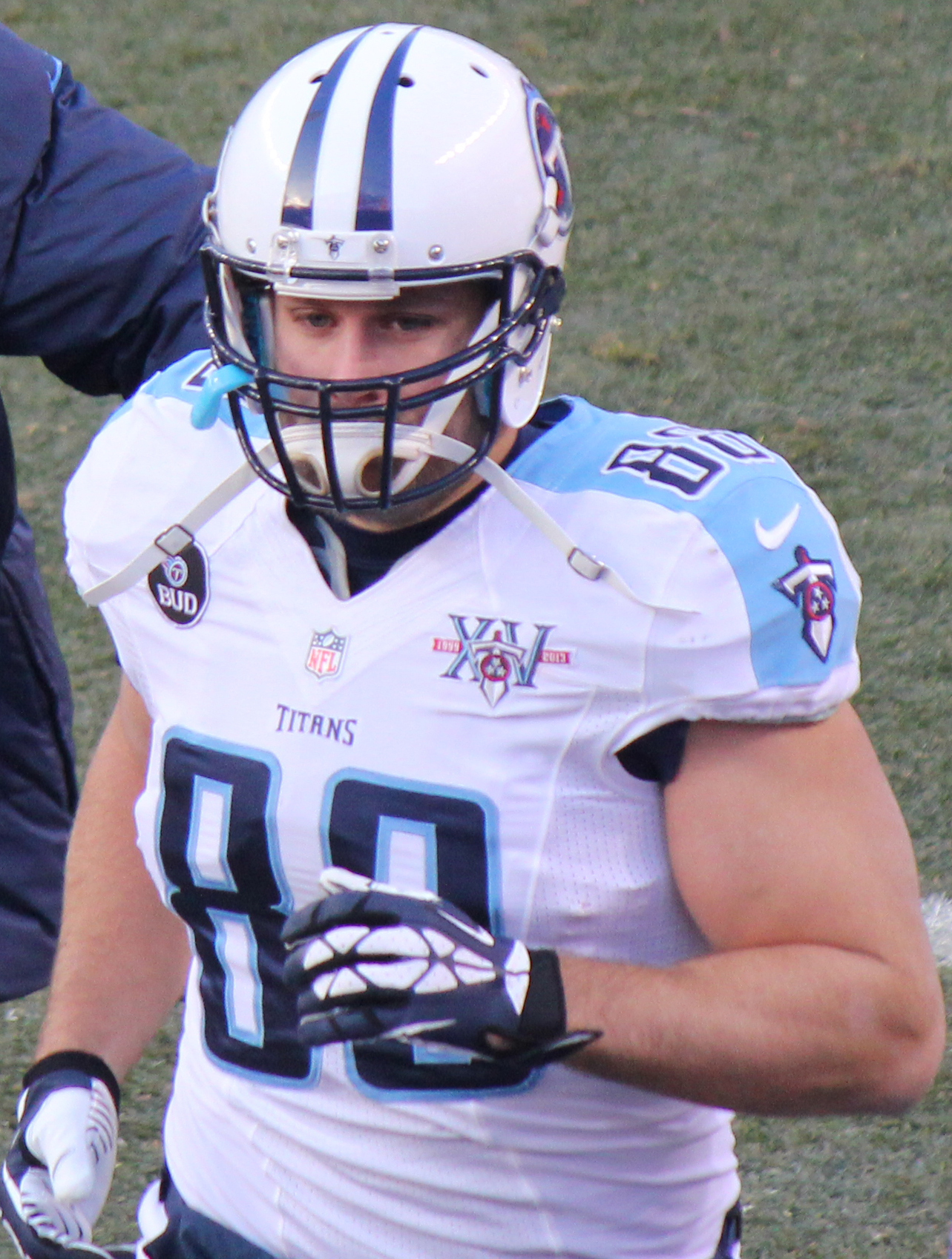
- Stevens with the Tennessee Titans in 2013

No. 88
- Position: Tight end

Personal information
- Born: September 1, 1984 (age 42); San Pedro, California, U.S.
- Listed height: 6 ft 3 in (1.91 m)
- Listed weight: 263 lb (119 kg)

Career information
- High school: Palos Verdes Peninsula (Rolling Hills Estates, California)
- College: California
- NFL draft: 2008: 3rd round, 85th overall pick

Career history
- Tennessee Titans (2008–2015)

Awards and highlights
- Second-team All-Pac-10 (2006)

Career NFL statistics
- Receptions: 60
- Receiving yards: 724
- Receiving touchdowns: 6
- Stats at Pro Football Reference

Craig Chase Stevens (born September 1, 1984) is an American former professional football player who was a tight end for eight seasons with the Tennessee Titans of the National Football League (NFL). He was selected by the Titans in the third round of the 2008 NFL draft. He played college football for the California Golden Bears.

== Early life ==
Stevens attended Palos Verdes Peninsula High School in Rolling Hills Estates, California.

== Professional career ==
Stevens played for the Tennessee Titans of the NFL from 2008 to 2015. Throughout his career, he was mainly used as a blocking tight end and special teams player.

On February 18, 2016, Stevens re-signed with the Titans. The Titans announced Stevens's retirement on August 23, 2016. He finished his career with 60 receptions for 724 yards and six touchdowns.

== Personal life ==
Craig has a younger brother, Eric, who played fullback for the St. Louis Rams. Jeff Fisher, who drafted Craig, picked up Eric as an undrafted free agent.

Craig is the cousin of American pole vaulter, Mike Tully, who won a silver in the 1984 Summer Olympics.
