= Worrell Williams =

American football player (born 1986)

No. 50, 51
- Position: Linebacker

Personal information
- Born: March 6, 1986 (age 40); Sacramento, California, U.S.
- Listed height: 5 ft 11 in (1.80 m)
- Listed weight: 242 lb (110 kg)

Career information
- High school: Grant Union (Sacramento, California)
- College: California
- NFL draft: 2009: undrafted

Career history
- San Francisco 49ers (2009)*; California Redwoods (2009); Denver Broncos (2010)*; California Redwoods / Sacramento Mountain Lions (2009-2010)
- * Offseason or practice squad member only

Worrell Williams (born March 6, 1986) is an American former football linebacker. He was signed by the Redwoods as an undrafted free agent in 2009. He played college football at California. He was also a member of the San Francisco 49ers and the Denver Broncos.

== Early life ==
Williams was one of the most highly sought-after high school players in the country after a stunning senior year at Grant Union High School in Sacramento, California. He recorded 94 tackles and 6 sacks on defense and added 738 rushing yards and 11 touchdowns on the offensive side of the ball. He was named SuperPrep and PrepStar All-American and ranked the number six outside linebacker in the nation and the number 16 overall player out of California by Rivals.com. He was voted onto the PrepStar All-West team. His older brother, D. J. Williams, is a former NFL linebacker.

== College career ==
Williams started 36 games at California from 2005–2008. He earned honorable mention All-Pac-10 honors as a senior in 2008 after recording 64 tackles, 5 stops for losses, 1 sack, 1 interception for 50 yards and 6 pass defenses. He started all 13 games in his final year at Cal. He ranked second on the team with 105 tackles as a junior in 2007. He also added 8.5 tackles for loss. He ended his stellar college career having made 246 tackles.

== Professional career ==
Pre-draft measurables
Height	Weight	Arm length	Hand span	40-yard dash	10-yard split	20-yard split	Vertical jump	Broad jump	Bench press
5 ft 10 3/4 in (1.80 m)	240 lb (109 kg)	32 3/8 in (0.82 m)	9 3/4 in (0.25 m)	4.75 s	1.61 s	2.70 s	35.0 in (0.89 m)	9 ft 3 in (2.82 m)	23 reps

Williams is a local product returning for a second UFL season after signing a free agent contract with the Sacramento Mountain Lions. He played for the California Redwoods during the inaugural 2009 UFL campaign and recorded 2 tackles and 1 pass defense. He has spent time with the NFL's San Francisco 49ers, attending the team's mini-camp in the spring of 2009. He was also on the Denver Broncos roster during their 2010 training camp.
