= Mike Tepper =

American football player (born 1985)

No. 67
- Position: Offensive tackle

Personal information
- Born: December 11, 1985 (age 40); Long Beach, California, U.S.

Career information
- College: California
- NFL draft: 2010: undrafted

Career history
- Dallas Cowboys (2010)*; Indianapolis Colts (2011); Kansas City Chiefs (2013)*
- * Offseason or practice squad member only

Awards and highlights
- First-team All-Pac-10 (2009)

Career NFL statistics
- Games played: 6
- Games started: 4
- Stats at Pro Football Reference

Michael Colin Tepper (born December 11, 1985) is an American football offensive tackle in the National Football League (NFL). He is a free agent. He has played for the Dallas Cowboys, Indianapolis Colts, and Kansas City Chiefs. He played college football for the California Golden Bears.

Mike Tepper was born in Long Beach, California and grew up in Cypress, California where he attended St. Hedwig Catholic private school. He grew up playing AYSO soccer (11 years). He attended Pacifica High School in Garden Grove, California where he transitioned to American Football. While at Pacifica, he played Football, Men's Volleyball, and Track and Field.

While at Pacifica HS, he became recognized for his athletic talents in American Football and was selected and awarded All-League (2001, 2002, 2003), All-CIF (2002, 2003), All-Far West (2003), and All-American (2003). He was later selected to Orange County's All-Decade team in 2010/11.
