= 2007 Stanford Cardinal football team =

American college football season

2007 Stanford Cardinal football
- Conference: Pacific-10 Conference
- Record: 4–8 (3–6 Pac-10)
- Head coach: Jim Harbaugh (1st season)
- Offensive coordinator: David Shaw (1st season)
- Offensive scheme: Pro-style
- Defensive coordinator: Scott Shafer (1st season)
- Base defense: 4–3
- Home stadium: Stanford Stadium

2007 Pacific-10 Conference football standings
	Conf.			Overall
Team	W		L	W		L
No. 3 USC +	7	–	2	11	–	2
No. 16 Arizona State +	7	–	2	10	–	3
No. 25 Oregon State	6	–	3	9	–	4
No. 23 Oregon	5	–	4	9	–	4
UCLA	5	–	4	6	–	7
Arizona	4	–	5	5	–	7
California	3	–	6	7	–	6
Washington State	3	–	6	5	–	7
Stanford	3	–	6	4	–	8
Washington	2	–	7	4	–	9
+ – Conference co-champions; Rankings from AP Poll

The 2007 Stanford Cardinal football team represented Stanford University in the 2007 NCAA Division I FBS football season. In Jim Harbaugh's inaugural season at Stanford, the 41-point underdog Cardinal pulled off the second greatest point-spread upset in college football history by defeating the #1 USC Trojans in a mid-season game (USC had been ranked No. 1 in all national pre-season polls, picked unanimously to win the Pac-10 Conference, and expected to contend for a national championship – until the Stanford upset). To cap off Harbaugh's first season, the Cardinal defeated archrival Cal in Stanford's final game of the season to win the Stanford Axe for the first time in six years (marking the only game in a series of eight stretching between 2002 and 2009 that was won by Stanford).

The team played their home games at Stanford Stadium in Stanford, California and competed in the Pacific-10 Conference. The Cardinal improved on their 1–11 record from the 2006 season by going 4–8 in the 2007 season.

== Schedule ==
Date	Time	Opponent	Site	TV	Result	Attendance
September 1	12:30 p.m.	No. 14 UCLA	Stanford Stadium; Stanford, CA (rivalry)	FSN	L 17–45	38,860
September 15	7:00 p.m.	San Jose State*	Stanford Stadium; Stanford, CA (Bill Walsh Legacy Game)	FSNBA	W 37–0	36,144
September 22	7:00 p.m.	No. 13 Oregon	Stanford Stadium; Stanford, CA (rivalry)		L 31–55	35,019
September 29	7:00 p.m.	No. 23 Arizona State	Stanford Stadium; Stanford, CA	FSNBA	L 3–41	32,125
October 6	4:00 p.m.	at No. 2 USC	Los Angeles Memorial Coliseum; Los Angeles, CA (rivalry)	Versus	W 24–23	85,125
October 13	2:00 p.m.	TCU*^{†}	Stanford Stadium; Stanford, CA		L 36–38	37,777
October 20	4:00 p.m.	at Arizona	Arizona Stadium; Tucson, AZ	FSNBA	W 21–20	55,270
October 27	3:30 p.m.	at Oregon State	Reser Stadium; Corvallis, OR		L 6–23	42,089
November 3	3:30 p.m.	Washington	Stanford Stadium; Stanford, CA	FSNBA	L 9–27	36,570
November 10	3:30 p.m.	at Washington State	Martin Stadium; Pullman, WA	FSNBA	L 17–33	31,110
November 24	3:30 p.m.	Notre Dame*	Stanford Stadium; Stanford, CA (Legends Trophy)	ESPN	L 14–21	48,953
December 1	4:00 p.m.	California	Stanford Stadium; Stanford, CA (110th Big Game)	Versus	W 20–13	49,209
*Non-conference game; ^{†}Homecoming; Rankings from AP Poll released prior to the game; All times are in Pacific time

== Coaches ==
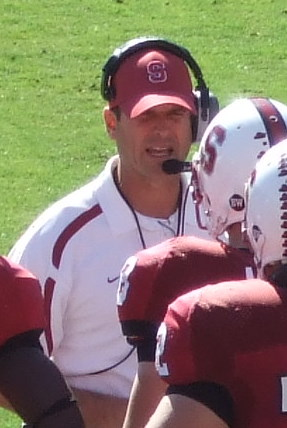
First-Year Head Coach Jim Harbaugh

Name	Position	Year at Stanford	Alma mater (year)
Jim Harbaugh	Head coach	1st	Michigan (1986)
Scott Shafer	Defensive coordinator Assistant head coach	1st	Baldwin–Wallace (1990)
David Shaw	Offensive coordinator Wide receivers	1st	Stanford (1995)
Lance Anderson	Defensive tackles Recruiting coordinator	1st	Idaho State (1996)
Andy Buh	Linebackers	1st	Nevada (1996)
Chris Dalman	Offensive line	1st	Stanford (1992)
Tim Drevno	Tight ends	1st	Cal State Fullerton (1992)
D. J. Durkin	Defensive ends Special teams	1st	Bowling Green (2001)
Willie Taggart	Running backs	1st	Western Kentucky (1998)
Clayton White	Defensive backs	1st	North Carolina State (2001)
Shannon Turley	Strength and conditioning	1st	Virginia Tech (2000)
Coleman Hutzler	Recruiting analyst	1st	Middlebury College (2006)

== Game summaries ==
=== UCLA ===
	1	2	3	4	Total
#14 Bruins	7	7	14	17	45
Cardinal	0	7	3	7	17

In Jim Harbaugh's debut game as Stanford's new head coach, UCLA's offense amassed 600 yards and overwhelmed the Cardinal defense in the second half, as UCLA won handily. UCLA's Ben Olson threw 5 touchdown passes and finished 16–29 for 286 yards while fellow Bruin Kahlil Bell led the running game by gaining 195 yards on 19 carries. This individual performance was the 18th best single game rushing performance in Bruin football history, placing Bell right after Freeman McNeil, who had 197 yards against Stanford in 1979, and right before Gaston Green, who had 194 yards against Tennessee in 1985.

=== San Jose State ===
	1	2	3	4	Total
Spartans	0	0	0	0	0
Cardinal	3	6	7	21	37

=== Oregon ===
	1	2	3	4	Total
#13 Ducks	21	3	21	10	55
Cardinal	3	28	0	0	31

=== Arizona State ===
	1	2	3	4	Total
#23 Sun Devils	6	15	6	14	41
Cardinal	0	3	0	0	3

=== USC ===
Stanford Cardinal vs. USC Trojans – Game summary

Quarter	1	2	3	4	Total
Cardinal	0	0	7	17	24
#2 Trojans	3	6	7	7	23

at Los Angeles Memorial Coliseum • Los Angeles, California

- Date: October 6, 2007
- Game time: 4:00 p.m.
- Game attendance: 76,750
- TV: Versus

Game information

First quarter

- USC – David Buehler 35-yard field goal, 6:25. USC 3–0. Drive: 6 plays, 63 yards, 1:45.

Second quarter

- USC – Chauncey Washington 1-yard run (kick blocked), 7:15. USC 9–0. Drive: 8 plays, 64 yards, 3:25.

Third quarter

- STAN – Austin Yancy 31-yard interception return (Derek Belch kick), 11:58. USC 9–7. Drive: 3 plays, 8 yards, 0:50.
- USC – Fred Davis 63-yard pass from John David Booty (David Buehler kick), 2:54. USC 16–7. Drive: 6 plays, 82 yards, 3:10.

Fourth quarter

- STAN – Anthony Kimble 1-yard run (Derek Belch kick), 14:54. USC 16–14. Drive: 9 plays 75 yards, 2:54.
- USC – Ronald Johnson 46-yard pass from John David Booty (David Buehler kick). USC 23–14. Drive: 9 plays, 86 yards, 3:44.
- STAN – Derek Belch 26-yard field goal, 5:43. USC 23–17. Drive: 12 plays, 61 yards, 5:15.
- STAN – Mark Bradford 10-yard pass from Tavita Pritchard (Derek Belch kick), 0:48. Stanford 24–23. Drive: 10 plays, 45 yards, 2:02.

Top passers

- STAN – Tavita Pritchard – 11/30, 149 yards, 1 TD, 1 int
- USC – John David Booty – 24/40, 364 yards, 2 TD, 4 int

Top rushers

- STAN – Anthony Kimble – 17 carries, 32 yards, 1 TD
- USC – Chauncey Washington – 23 carries, 75 yards, 1 TD

Top receivers

- STAN – Mark Bradford – 5 receptions, 87 yards, 1 TD
- USC – Fred Davis – 5 receptions, 152 yards, 1 TD

The struggling Stanford Cardinal continued Pac-10 play by playing the USC Trojans in the Los Angeles Memorial Coliseum, where the Trojans had not lost in six seasons. In a major upset, USC stumbled at home to the 41-point underdog Cardinal, losing 24–23.

Harbaugh made headlines prior to the season by claiming 2007 would be USC Coach Pete Carroll's last year with the Trojans before departing to the NFL, drawing a terse rebuke from Carroll; Harbaugh later called the 2007 Trojans one of the best teams in the history of college football at Pac-10 Media Day, reiterating the position in the week before their game. However, there were no hard feelings between the coaches. The two kept in cordial phone contact and Carroll made light of Harbaugh's comments several times during the season.

Stanford's starting quarterback, redshirt senior T. C. Ostrander, suffered a seizure on the afternoon of September 30, one day after the game against Arizona State; he was released from Stanford Hospital after a few hours, but as a precautionary measure he was held out of the game against USC. The starting quarterback position fell to Tavita Pritchard, a redshirt sophomore with three passes in his college career. Stanford was also without two other key starters: defensive lineman Ekom Udofia (ankle) and offensive lineman Allen Smith (knee). On October 3, it was announced that USC running back C. J. Gable, who was averaging a team-best 11 yards a carry, would undergo season-ending abdominal surgery to correct a nagging sports hernia that had limited his ability since the previous season; because he had only played in the first three games, he would seek a medical redshirt season. Gable's fellow running back, Stafon Johnson, was also held out of the game due to a foot bruise suffered the previous week.

Stanford was the last team to beat USC at the Coliseum, doing so on September 29, 2001 under Tyrone Willingham (who had since become the coach of Washington) against then-first-year coach Carroll. By game week, the line for the game favored the Trojans by 39.5 points, and reached 41 points by gametime. The loss ended multiple USC streaks, including a five-game win streak against Stanford and a 35-game home winning streak. For sportsbooks, the loss to a 41-point underdog marked the biggest upset in their history.

There were a few positive efforts for the Trojans: Tight end Fred Davis caught five passes for a career-best 152 yards, including a 63-yard touchdown; and nose tackle Sedrick Ellis had three sacks. However, there were many more errors and substandard performances: quarterback John David Booty, who broke a bone in the middle finger of his throwing hand in the first half, had four passes intercepted in the second half. The offensive line had been suffering since losing two starters in one play during the previous week's game at Washington, but the effect was severe against Stanford; the offensive line gave up four sacks, one more than the Trojans had surrendered all season, and USC gained only 95 yards rushing. Key receiver Patrick Turner dropped several passes, the defense gave up 17 points in the fourth quarter and USC had an extra-point attempt blocked, a point which became a crucial difference. Like their previous game against Washington, USC out-gained Stanford by 224 yards (459 to 235) but made many crucial turnovers and penalties. In the press conference following the game, Carroll summarized his concerns: "It's real clear that we have fallen out of line with our philosophy that has guided this program for years; we're turning the ball over too much."

Opinions in the sports press ranged from proclaiming the end of the USC's era of dominance in college football to calling the loss a major, but not fatal, set-back to any hopes for a Trojans run at the national championship. The Trojans fell to No. 10 in the AP Poll; however, USC only fell to No. 7 in both the Coaches Poll and Harris Poll, both of which are the human components for determining who the BCS chooses for the National Championship Game. As a result, USC remained in outside title contention with upcoming games against consensus-No. 2 California and top-10 Oregon. The upset landed the Trojans in ESPN.com's Bottom 10.

In an interview the following month, Carroll assessed the mistakes that led to the loss as his own:

We really blew it against Stanford. We screwed it up because we played a guy that was hurt. I made a mistake on that. That was me. ... If anything really was a factor, it was my cockiness that there was no way we could lose a game. It didn't matter – we could keep running our offense, keep working on stuff, and they would never beat us. ... Broken hand? What was I thinking? I'm the one that screwed it up. He's a warrior. He's the one telling me "I can play." That's what he should be telling me. ... I missed a big one. It cost us a game that really cost us the flavor of this season. We've been tainted ever since, for obvious reasons. We gave away a game to a team that's won two or three games. Amazing. But it's awesome for football, it's awesome for Stanford and all that. Great for those guys. Sucks to be us in that regard. We screwed it up.

At the end of the regular season, Sports Illustrated chose Stanford's upset of USC as the second "Biggest Upset of 2007" after Division I FCS Appalachian State's upset of No. 5 Michigan.

=== TCU ===
	1	2	3	4	Total
Horned Frogs	0	17	7	14	38
Cardinal	7	14	10	5	36

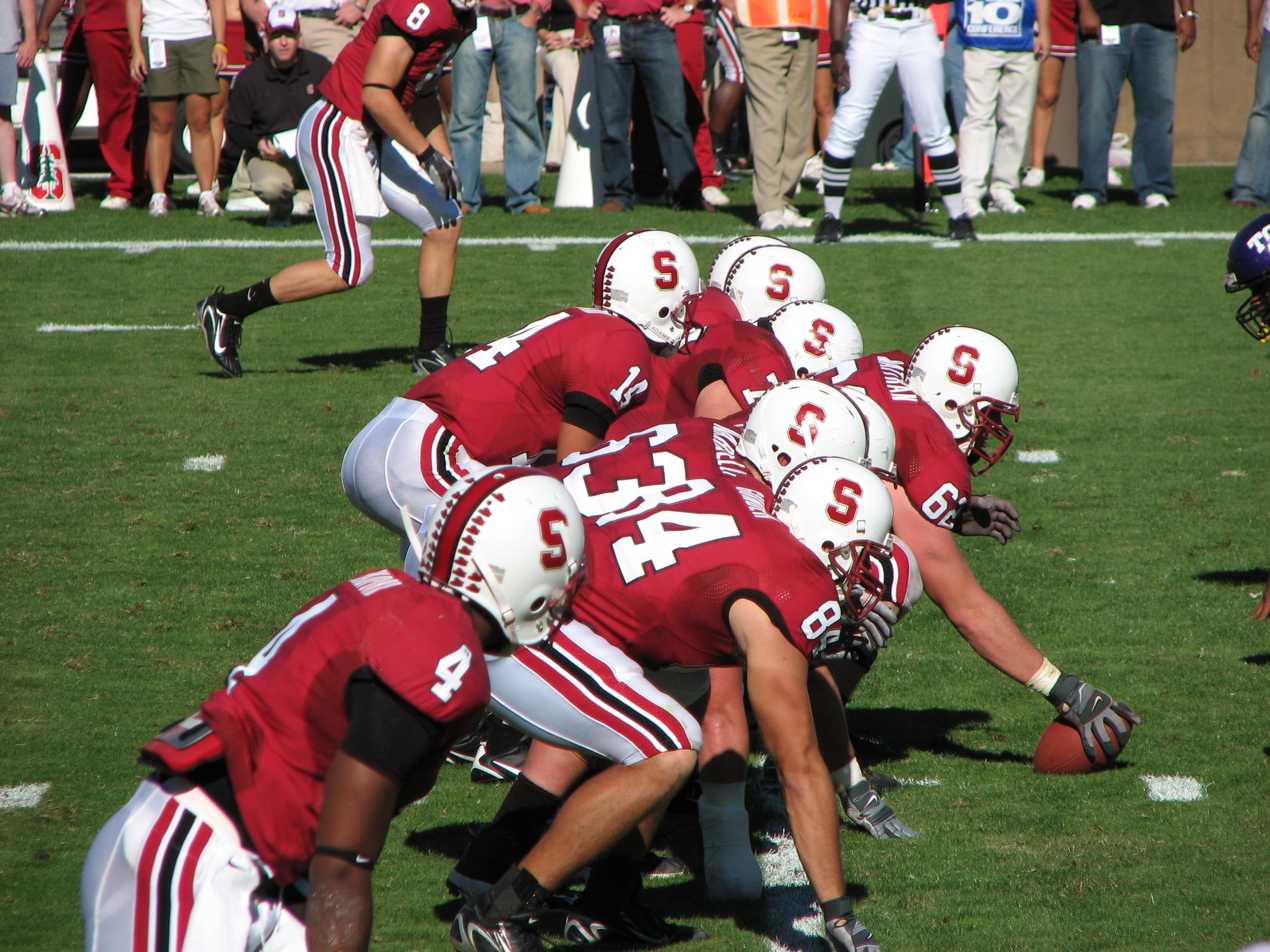
Stanford on offense

A week after defeating top-ranked USC, Stanford welcomed TCU to Stanford Stadium for homecoming. It was also the first meeting between the two schools. The Cardinal found themselves with a double-digit lead late in the second half of this game, as they led the Horned Frogs 31–17 with 3:54 remaining in the 3rd quarter. TCU's Andy Dalton then hit Jimmy Young for a 70-yard touchdown and Aaron Brown for a 2-yard touchdown pass on fourth down to tie the game at 31. Stanford kicked a field goal with 7:22 remaining to re-take the lead, 34–31. Brown gave TCU its first lead of the game with a 2-yard touchdown run with 4:13 left. An intentional safety by TCU in the final seconds made the final score 38–36. Dalton ended the game with a career-high 344 passing yards.

=== Arizona ===
	1	2	3	4	Total
Cardinal	0	14	0	7	21
Wildcats	3	7	10	0	20

=== Oregon State ===
	1	2	3	4	Total
Cardinal	0	6	0	0	6
Beavers	7	7	3	6	23

=== Washington ===
	1	2	3	4	Total
Huskies	7	3	3	14	27
Cardinal	0	3	6	0	9

=== Washington State ===
	1	2	3	4	Total
Cardinal	0	0	17	0	17
Cougars	3	7	10	13	33

=== Notre Dame ===
	1	2	3	4	Total
Fighting Irish	7	7	0	7	21
Cardinal	7	7	0	0	14

The Fighting Irish concluded their season on a high note, winning its second straight game and its second win on the road. Notre Dame's Robert Hughes ran for 136 yards and the go-ahead 6-yard touchdown with 6:06 remaining in the 4th quarter to help the Irish beat the Cardinal 21–14. The Irish's Jimmy Clausen went 19–32 for 196 yards and one touchdown. The Cardinal missed 4 field goals and turned the ball over twice. Notre Dame, meanwhile, committed 4 turnovers, including 3 fumbles and an interception.

Notre Dame almost added another score on what would have been a spectacular finish to the half. Notre Dame's David Bruton intercepted Stanford quarterback Tavita Pritchard's last-play heave at the 3-yard line and began a three-lateral return to the end zone that was called back on a personal foul on Notre Dame defensive lineman Trevor Laws. Irish Safety Tom Zbikowski ran the final 30 yards after a lateral from Darrin Walls, and the only thing missing was the band on the field as it was 25 years ago when California shocked Stanford with The Play.

=== California ===
Team	1	2	3	4	Total
California	7	3	0	3	13
• Stanford	7	6	7	0	20

- Date: December 1
- Location: Stanford Stadium, Stanford, California
- Game start: 7:00 p.m. EST

Scoring summary
1	10:49	STAN	Mark Bradford 28-yard pass from T.C. Ostrander (Derek Belch kick)	STAN 7-0
1	7:20	CAL	Robert Jordan 46-yard pass from Nate Longshore (Jordan Kay kick)	Tied 7-7
2	12:55	STAN	Derek Belch 36-yard field goal	STAN 10-7
2	7:10	CAL	Jordan Kay 27-yard field goal	Tied 10-10
2	3:46	STAN	Derek Belch 38-yard field goal	STAN 13-10
3	8:00	STAN	Austin Gunder 1-yard pass from Tavita Pritchard (Derek Blech kick)	STAN 20-10
4	4:34	CAL	Jordan Kay 42-yard field goal	STAN 20-13

Stanford led Cal for the entirety of the 110th Big Game, winning 20–13 and gaining The Axe after Cal had held onto it for five straight years, marking Cal Coach Jeff Tedford's first loss to the Cardinal, something Harbaugh's two predecessors had failed to do. Stanford confused Cal on defense by alternating quarterbacks T. C. Ostrander and Tavita Pritchard in offensive series. The Golden Bears's Nate Longshore was 22/47 with 252 yards, 1 touchdown, and two interceptions, throwing one at the 7-yard line with 2:10 remaining. Cal's Justin Forsett ran for 96 yards on 19 carries. The Golden Bears's Robert Jordan caught 4 receptions for 99 yards including a 46-yard touchdown reception. Despite injuries that had depleted the Cardinal's backfield to the point where one player was converted to a running back, Stanford rushed for 120 yards. California's offense was limited to one touchdown and a field goal, Cal's worst offensive performance of the season. Longshore continued to struggle in the second half, leading the offense to only one field goal after half time. Cal committed 10 penalties for 118 yards.
