= 2007 UCLA Bruins football team =

American college football season

2007 UCLA Bruins football

Las Vegas Bowl, L 16–17 vs. BYU
- Conference: Pacific-10 Conference
- Record: 6–7 (5–4 Pac-10)
- Head coach: Karl Dorrell (5th season; regular season); DeWayne Walker (interim; bowl game)
- Offensive coordinator: Jay Norvell (1st season)
- Offensive scheme: West Coast
- Defensive coordinator: DeWayne Walker (2nd season)
- Base defense: 4–3
- Home stadium: Rose Bowl

Uniform

2007 Pacific-10 Conference football standings
	Conf.			Overall
Team	W		L	W		L
No. 3 USC +	7	–	2	11	–	2
No. 16 Arizona State +	7	–	2	10	–	3
No. 25 Oregon State	6	–	3	9	–	4
No. 23 Oregon	5	–	4	9	–	4
UCLA	5	–	4	6	–	7
Arizona	4	–	5	5	–	7
California	3	–	6	7	–	6
Washington State	3	–	6	5	–	7
Stanford	3	–	6	4	–	8
Washington	2	–	7	4	–	9
+ – Conference co-champions; Rankings from AP Poll

The 2007 UCLA Bruins football team represented the University of California, Los Angeles (UCLA) in the 2007 NCAA Division I FBS football season. They played their home games at the Rose Bowl in Pasadena, California and were coached by Karl Dorrell for the regular season. It was Dorrell's fifth, and final season as the UCLA head coach. UCLA's season was marked by numerous injuries, particularly at quarterback. Original starting quarterback Ben Olson injured his knee early in the season and missed over four games. Backup quarterback Patrick Cowan also suffered a knee injury but returned for two more games before suffering a collapsed lung against Arizona. Coach Karl Dorrell was fired following the loss in the 77th UCLA–USC rivalry football game, the final regular season game for the Bruins. Defensive coordinator DeWayne Walker became the interim coach for the 2007 Las Vegas Bowl, in which the Bruins lost to BYU, 17–16. The Bruins finished 6–7 overall, 5–4 in the Pacific-10 Conference, where they were tied for fourth place.

== Pre-season ==
The UCLA Bruins had been ranked highly in the preseason polls, despite their mediocre 7-6 record in 2006, largely because they returned 20 starters in 2007. They had been predicted to finish 3rd in the Pac-10, behind the nation's #1 Southern California as well as California.

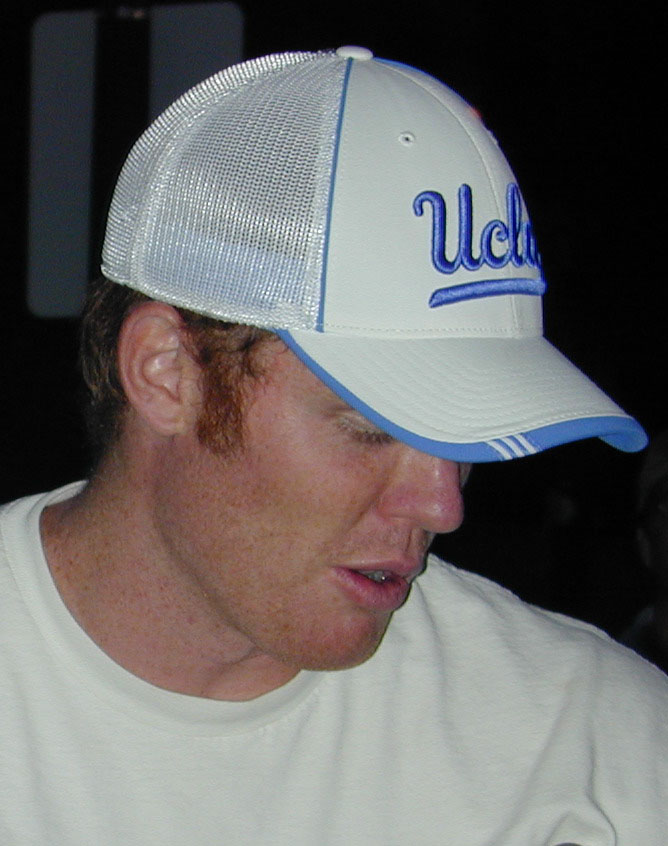
Quarterback Ben Olson

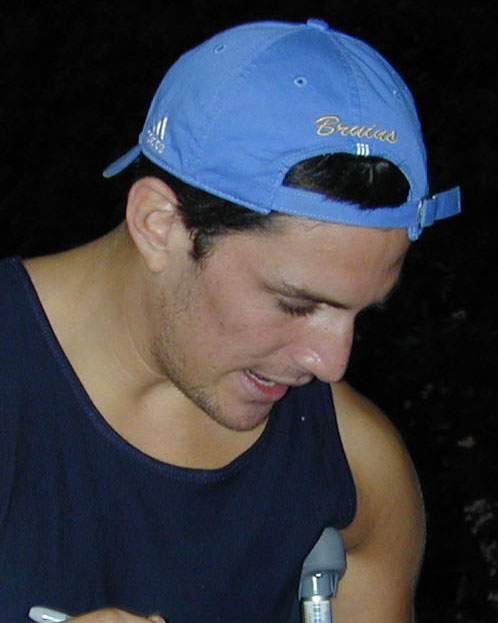
Quarterback Patrick Cowan

Quarterback Ben Olson, who began the 2006 season as the starter, again began the season with the starting job.

Jay Norvell joined the coaching staff as the new offensive coordinator. He replaced Jim Svoboda, who was fired by head coach Dorrell after the offense received much criticism for not performing up to expectations in 2006. Norvell was the offensive coordinator for the Nebraska Cornhuskers for the previous three years, where they ran the West Coast offense very successfully. Following the 2007 season, Norvell was hired by the University of Oklahoma.

DeWayne Walker returned as the defensive coordinator after a successful 2006 season, in which the Bruins improved their defense. They ranked highly in several national defensive categories, such as rushing defense (9th, and 1st in the Pac-10) and total defense (33rd). Their achievement came when they held the USC Trojan offense to only a touchdown in beating their rivals, 13-9.

== Schedule ==
Date	Time	Opponent	Rank	Site	TV	Result	Attendance
September 1	12:30 pm	at Stanford	No. 14	Stanford Stadium; Stanford, CA (rivalry)	FSN	W 45–17	38,860
September 8	3:30 pm	BYU*	No. 13	Rose Bowl; Pasadena, CA	Versus	W 27–17	72,986
September 15	2:00 pm	at Utah*	No. 11	Rice-Eccles Stadium; Salt Lake City, UT	Versus	L 6–44	43,056
September 22	7:15 pm	Washington		Rose Bowl; Pasadena, CA	FSN	W 44–31	72,124
September 29	7:15 pm	at Oregon State		Reser Stadium; Corvallis, OR	FSN	W 40–14	41,137
October 6	5:00 pm	Notre Dame*		Rose Bowl; Pasadena, CA	ABC	L 6–20	78,543
October 20	12:30 pm	No. 10 California^{†}		Rose Bowl; Pasadena, CA (rivalry)	ABC	W 30–21	83,494
October 27	3:30 pm	at Washington State		Martin Stadium; Pullman, WA	FSN	L 7–27	31,027
November 3	12:30 pm	at Arizona		Arizona Stadium; Tucson, AZ	ABC	L 27–34	51,727
November 10	12:30 pm	No. 9 Arizona State		Rose Bowl; Pasadena, CA	ABC	L 20–24	78,690
November 24	12:30 pm	No. 9 Oregon		Rose Bowl; Pasadena, CA	ABC	W 16–0	72,434
December 1	1:30 pm	at No. 8 USC		Los Angeles Memorial Coliseum; Los Angeles, CA (Victory Bell)	ABC	L 7–24	91,553
December 22	5:00 pm	vs. No. 19 BYU*		Sam Boyd Stadium; Whitney, NV (Las Vegas Bowl)	ESPN	L 16–17	40,712
*Non-conference game; ^{†}Homecoming; Rankings from AP Poll released prior to the game; All times are in Pacific time

== Game summaries ==
=== Stanford ===
	1	2	3	4	Total
Bruins	7	7	14	17	45
Cardinal	0	7	3	7	17

UCLA's offense amassed 700 yards and overwhelmed the Cardinal defense in the second half, as UCLA won handily. The game was Jim Harbaugh's first as Stanford's new head coach. Ben Olson threw 6 touchdown passes and finished 16–29 for 286 yards. Kahlil Bell led the running game by gaining 195 yards on 19 carries. This individual performance was the 18th best single game rushing performance in Bruin football history, placing Bell right after Freeman McNeil, who had 197 yards against Stanford in 1979, and right before Gaston Green, who had 194 yards against Tennessee in 1985.

=== BYU ===
	1	2	3	4	Total
Cougars	0	3	14	0	17
Bruins	10	10	0	7	27

The Bruins avoided an upset in a tough game by beating the Cougars, 27–17. UCLA had control of the game in the first half, but BYU made it close in the third quarter. UCLA's pass defense was shaky, giving up 391 yards, and their own passing attack inconsistent, as Ben Olson completed only 13 of 28 passes for 126 yards.

=== Utah ===
	1	2	3	4	Total
Bruins	3	3	0	0	6
Utes	7	7	13	17	44

After starting the season with a couple of wins over Stanford and BYU, and achieving a No. 11 Associated Press ranking, UCLA stumbled against an injured, winless, and unranked Utah Utes team, 44–6. UCLA was completely dominated in all aspects of the game by the 0–2 Utah Utes, losing 44–6. Ben Olson threw three interceptions, and the Utes forced two other turnovers. In addition, the Bruins had 10 penalties for 61 yards. The blowout loss dropped UCLA completely out of the rankings.

=== Washington ===
Team	1	2	3	4	Total
Washington	0	10	0	21	31
• UCLA	3	7	14	20	44

- Date: September 22
- Location: Rose Bowl, Pasadena, California
- Game start: 10:30 p.m. EST
- Elapsed time: 3:33
- Game attendance: 72,124
- Game weather: Cloudy; 64 °F (18 °C); wind 5 mph (8.0 km/h) N
- Referee: Jack Folliard
- Television network: FSN

Scoring summary
Q1	5:32	UCLA	Forbath 47 yard field goal	UCLA 3–0
Q2	9:17	WASH	Reece 4 yard pass from Locker (Perkins kick)	WASH 7–3
Q2	7:29	UCLA	Johnson 2 yard pass from Cowan (Forbath kick)	UCLA 10–7
Q2	4:31	WASH	Perkins 35 yard field goal	Tie 10–10
Q3	10:43	UCLA	Bell 8 yard run (Forbath kick)	UCLA 17–10
Q3	1:31	UCLA	Keyes 60 yard interception return (Forbath kick)	UCLA 24–10
Q4	13:10	WASH	Russo 20 yard pass from Locker (Perkins kick)	UCLA 24–17
Q4	11:14	UCLA	Markey 72 yard run (Forbath kick)	UCLA 31–17
Q4	9:44	WASH	Russo 63 yard pass from Locker (Perkins kick)	UCLA 31–24
Q4	9:33	UCLA	Slater 85 yard kickoff return (Forbath kick)	UCLA 38–24
Q4	5:35	UCLA	Forbath 39 yard field goal	UCLA 41–24
Q4	4:30	WASH	Williams 11 yard pass from Locker (Perkins kick)	UCLA 41–31
Q4	2:10	UCLA	Forbath 30 yard field goal	UCLA 44–31

UCLA was able to bounce back from their embarrassing loss to Utah by beating Washington. The Bruins had a rather slow first half with a score of 10–10 at halftime. After the break the Bruins managed to gain momentum and outscore the Huskies to win the game. The statistics were in heavy favor of the Bruins with the total offensive yards being 537–340 for the Bruins and Huskies respectively. Chris Markey rushed for 193 yards, including a touchdown run of 73 yards and another long run for 66 yards. Safety Dennis Keyes added a 60-yard interception return for a touchdown, and Matt Slater ran back a kickoff 85 yards for another touchdown.

=== Oregon State ===
	1	2	3	4	Total
Bruins	0	6	6	28	40
Beavers	14	0	0	0	14

=== Notre Dame ===
	1	2	3	4	Total
Fighting Irish	3	0	17	0	20
#25 Bruins	3	3	0	0	6

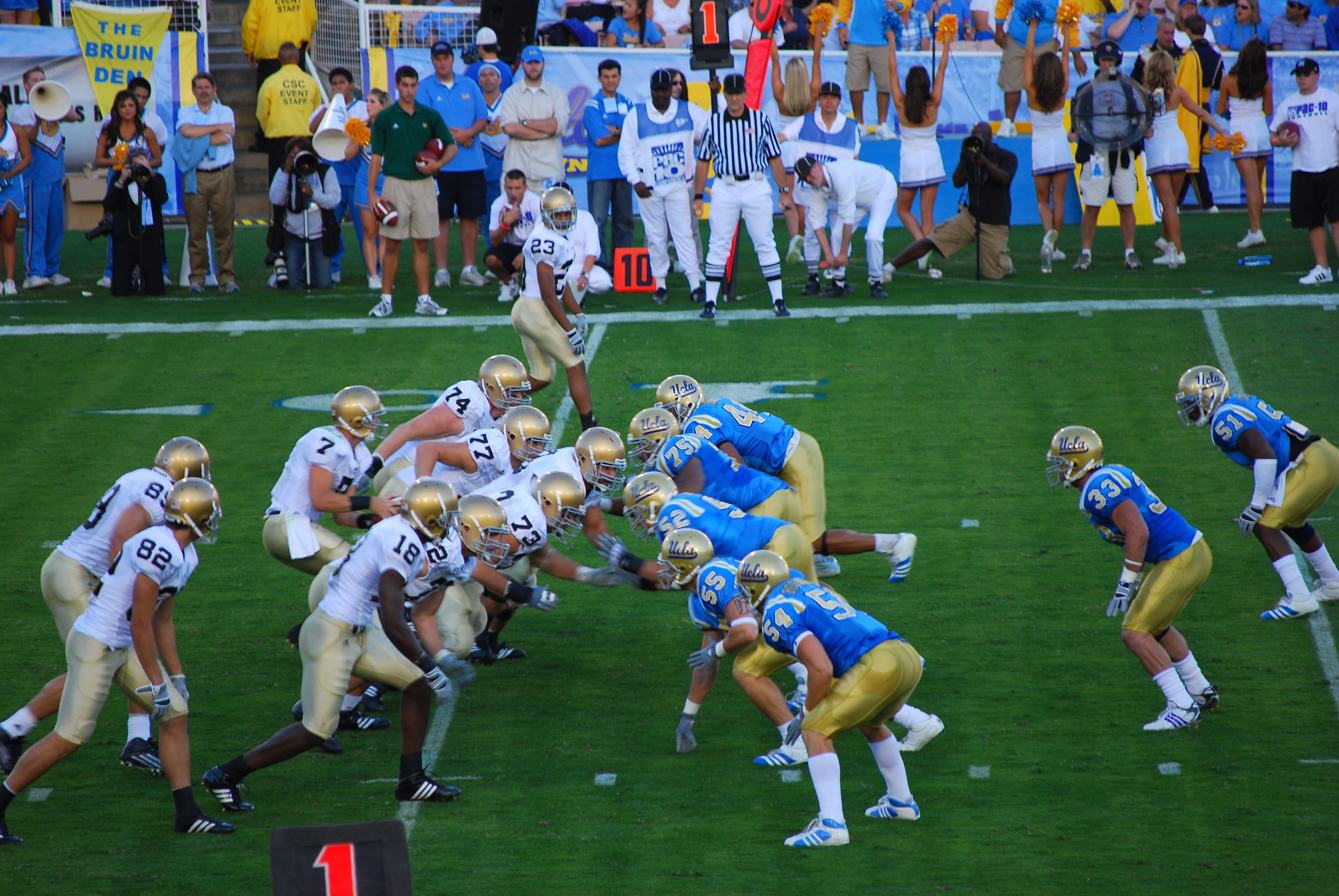
Jimmy Clausen directs the ND offense

UCLA was without its two starting quarterbacks. UCLA starter Ben Olson went out with a knee injury late in the first quarter, which left freshman walkon redshirt McLeod Bethel-Thompson to lead the Bruins. This was the first appearance for the Irish in the Rose Bowl stadium since the 1925 Rose Bowl. The Irish were able to capitalize on Bruin offensive mistakes to recover loose balls. This ended one of the worst slumps in Fighting Irish football, and prevented the Irish from equaling their longest losing streak in their history. The 1960 Notre Dame Fighting Irish football team lost eight straight games. The biggest cheer during the entire game came when the score of the 2007 Stanford vs. Southern California football game was announced. Fighting Irish and Bruins fans, who together are arch-rivals of the Trojans, cheered together.

=== California ===
	1	2	3	4	Total
#10 Golden Bears	7	7	7	0	21
Bruins	0	13	7	10	30

With both teams suffering surprising upsets at home in their previous games, both Cal and UCLA came into their Rose Bowl tilt looking to restore their reputation and Pac-10 title hopes. Cal had been ranked #2 in the nation and briefly had a chance to be #1, but they had lost to Oregon State. Despite out of conference losses to Notre Dame and Utah, UCLA remained undefeated in the conference at 4–0 and controlled their Pac-10 destiny. Cal had suffered only the loss from last week and were returning Nate Longshore back to the lineup. The game was played at the Rose Bowl with 83,494 in attendance.

The game was very close and included several lead changes. DeSean Jackson had 136 yards and two touchdowns on 9 receptions. Justin Forsett was held to 76 yards on 25 carries. Cal tight end Craig Stevens also caught a 21-yard touchdown pass in the first quarter. Cal entered the fourth quarter with a 21–20 lead, but Cal could not put UCLA away. Cal was stopped on its first two fourth quarter sequences that included 7 of the 8 plays as running plays. After UCLA scored a field goal to take a 23–21 lead and with only around two minutes left on the clock, the Bears went the air. Just outside field goal range, Longshore attempted a third down with 1:33 left on the clock which was intercepted by UCLA cornerback Alterraun Verner who ran for a 76-yard touchdown putting the score at 30–21 Bruins. On his next drive, Longshore attempted a 4th and 10 he was again intercepted by Keyes. UCLA converted a first down and ran the clock for the victory. Over the next five plays UCLA made a net of 9 yards and a first down to hold onto the ball and win the game 30–21. Longshore finished 232 yards, 3 touchdowns, and three interceptions.

California's defense allowed UCLA to rush for 183 yards (Kahlil Bell rushed for 142 yards) while recording one sack. The team recovered 2 UCLA fumbles, but could not create any points off those turnovers (and one turnover would lead to a Longshore interception).

=== Washington State ===
	1	2	3	4	Total
Bruins	7	0	0	0	7
Cougars	10	0	3	14	27

UCLA continued their unpredictable season by losing to underdog Washington St., who had not won a Pac-10 game until this one. The Cougars rolled up 545 yards of total offense to UCLA's 267 yards. After the Washington State loss, UCLA Athletic Director Dan Guerrero addressed UCLA's inconsistent football performances for the first time, stating, "I will be very interested to see how we finish the season. And you can use that." Many took this as a hint that Dorrell's job may be in serious jeopardy.

=== Arizona ===
	1	2	3	4	Total
Bruins	14	0	3	10	27
Wildcats	13	14	7	0	34

The Bruins suffered their fourth loss of the year to Arizona, and talk about coach Karl Dorrell's job security continues to increase. UCLA rallied in the fourth quarter to come within a touchdown but the Arizona lead was too much to overcome. Quarterback Pat Cowan suffered a concussion and a collapsed lung that knocked him out of the game, and Osaar Rasshan came in to lead the Bruins to 13 points. Rasshan had been the third-string quarterback last year, then converted to a wide receiver this year, but quickly converted back to a quarterback in the past few weeks as UCLA suffered injuries to the quarterback position.

=== Arizona State ===
	1	2	3	4	Total
#9 Sun Devils	0	10	14	0	24
Bruins	10	3	7	0	20

Arizona State had been undefeated, and ranked as high as number #6 before losing #5 Oregon, a game which would prove to be one of the factors in the Sun Devils being tied with USC for the PAC-10 title, and the Trojans getting the Rose Bowl berth, and the Sun Devils being knocked out of a BCS berth.

This game had PAC-10 title implications for both teams. UCLA kick returner Matthew Slater returned a kickoff for a touchdown, his third of the season, to bring the Bruins to within 24–20 in the third quarter. Osaar Rasshan, in his first start as quarterback, threw an interception in the final minutes of the game, giving the game to Arizona State, as neither team could score in the fourth quarter. Rasshan threw for 181 yards while rushing for 41.

=== Oregon ===
	1	2	3	4	Total
#9 Ducks	0	0	0	0	0
Bruins	3	3	3	7	16

The Bruins managed to knock off a top-10 team by shutting out the Oregon Ducks, who were without QB Dennis Dixon. The Ducks went through three quarterbacks, none of which were effective against the UCLA defense. On UCLA's side, Osaar Rasshan started the game, but original starting QB Ben Olson came in for the second half.

But the game was won by the UCLA defense. Turnovers set up first-half field goals for UCLA, and the Ducks could not move the ball at all. With the win, UCLA became bowl-eligible.

=== USC ===
	1	2	3	4	Total
Bruins	0	7	0	0	7
#8 Trojans	7	10	0	7	24

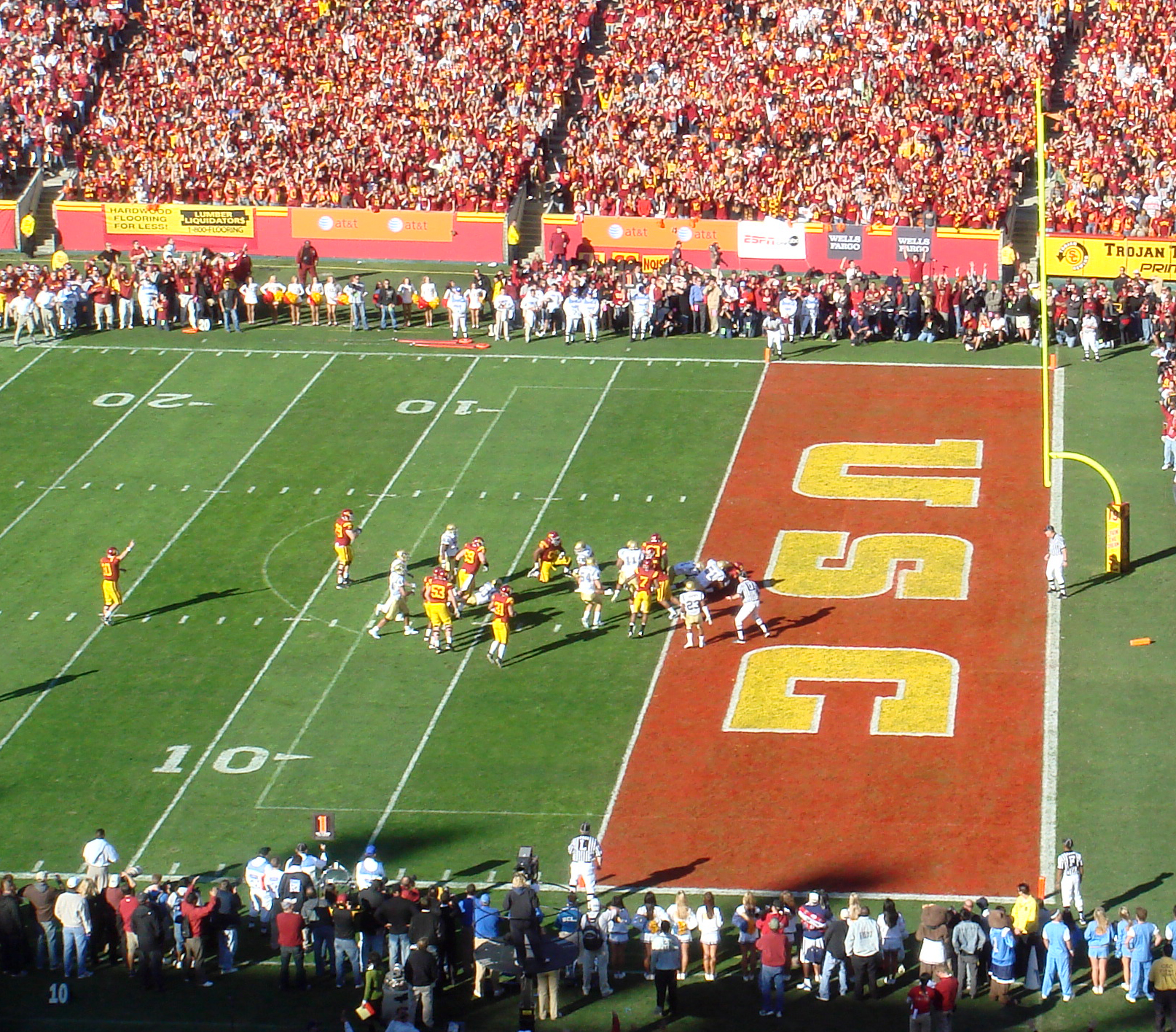
The Trojans and Bruins met in the 77th edition of their crosstown rivalry.

The USC Trojans beat the Bruins, avenging last year's game where the Bruins upset the Trojans, knocking USC out of the BCS Championship Game. USC was in control of the entire game in this year's contest. UCLA's only score of the day came in the final seconds of the first half, when WR Dominique Johnson made an incredible one-handed leaping grab of a fade pass from Pat Cowan.

The rest of the day, UCLA's offense could do nothing against the Trojan defense. UCLA's defense played respectably, but turnovers and the anemic offense doomed the Bruins' chances.

The Bruins ended the regular season at the Los Angeles Coliseum against the USC Trojans, who were led by head coach Pete Carroll, in the 77th edition of their annual crosstown rivalry game for possession of the Victory Bell. In the 2006 season, the Bruins' 13–9 upset of the then-No. 2 Trojans in the final week of the regular season ended the Trojans' hopes for reaching the National Championship game. With both teams ranked going into the season (USC first, UCLA 14th in the AP Poll), there was buzz in Los Angeles that both teams might reach their December 1 game undefeated. UCLA made it as high as 11th in both polls before suffering a 44–6 upset loss at unranked Utah in week 3 that knocked them out of the top 25. It was the 36th time that a Rose Bowl berth was on the line in the game: A USC victory would guarantee them at least a share of the Pac-10 Conference title and a berth in the 2008 Rose Bowl Game; UCLA, despite entering the game 6–5 (5–3 in the Pac-10), also entered the game with a chance at the Pac-10 title and a Rose Bowl berth if they could defeat the Trojans and Arizona could beat Arizona State in a game later in the day.

During the 2006 contest, UCLA Defensive Coordinator DeWayne Walker had the Bruins apply aggressive pressure to John David Booty, limiting the quarterback's ability to drive the passing game while holding the Trojans to 55 yards rushing and an average of only 1.9 yards per carry. USC entered the 2007 game averaging 186.6 yards rushing and 4.8 yards per carry, significantly higher than the 128 yards rushing per game in 2006.

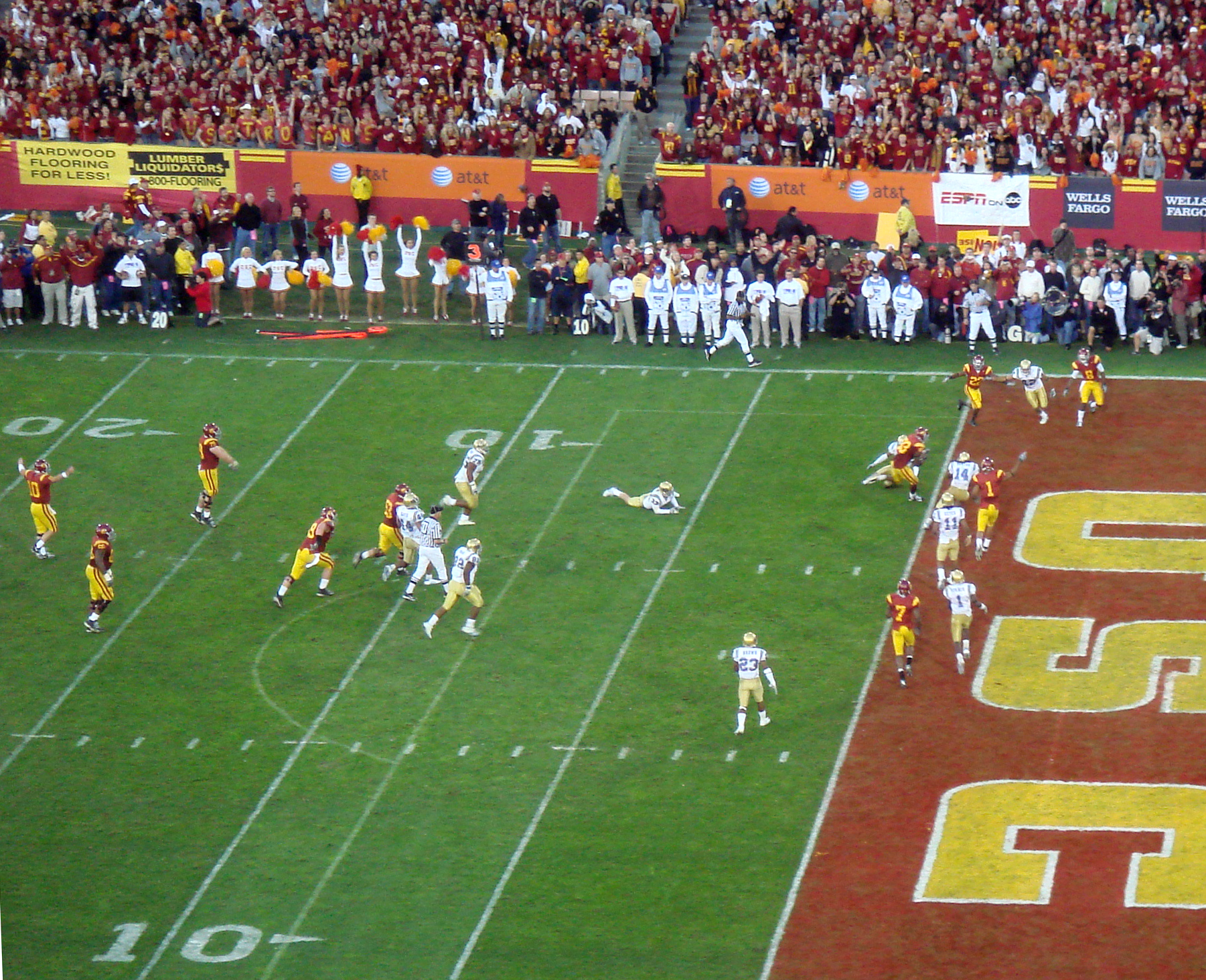
USC player Fred Davis (#83) takes a pass into the end zone.

In the week leading up to the game, a dispute between USC and the Coliseum Commission, the public managers of the Los Angeles Memorial Coliseum, went public. USC threatened to move to the Rose Bowl (home of the UCLA Bruins since 1982) if an agreement could not be reached. USC entered the game as a 20-point favorite.

The Trojans defense dominated the Bruins in a 24–7 victory before a sold-out Coliseum crowd. The Trojans held the Bruins to a season-low 168 yards, sacking quarterback Patrick Cowan four times for 31 yards in losses and held the Bruins to 12 net rushing yards. USC forced four turnovers, recovering three UCLA fumbles and intercepting a pass. The Bruins did not convert any of its 11 third down situations. The Bruins sole score came in a drive in the closing minutes of the first half. USC gained 231 rushing yards and 437 overall. On the ground, running back Joe McKnight rushed for 89 yards and a touchdown, Stafon Johnson ran for 73 yards and senior Chauncey Washington gained 66 yards and scored a touchdown. Booty completed 21 of 36 passes for 206 yards with a touchdown and an interception.

The victory assured USC a share of the Pac-10 title. Although Arizona State would defeat Arizona later in the night to become co-champions, the Trojans clinched a berth in the Rose Bowl by virtue of their victory over the Sun Devils the previous week. USC extended its streak of Pac-10 titles to six in a row, having already broken the record the previous season with five. Dorrell was fired by UCLA the following Monday by UCLA Athletic Director Dan Guerrero. USC's victory, coupled with another week of upsets, led the Trojans to rise to No. 6 in the AP Poll, No. 6 in the Coaches Poll, and No. 7 in the BCS standings.

=== Las Vegas Bowl ===
	1	2	3	4	Total
Bruins	3	10	0	3	16
Cougars	3	14	0	0	17

Eathyn Manumaleuna blocked a last second field goal by UCLA as BYU hung on to beat the Bruins 17–16. BYU quarterback Max Hall went 21–35 for 231 yards and two touchdowns. Manase Tonga led the rushing with 3 carries for 21 yards. The MVP of the game, Austin Collie had 6 catches for 107 yards and 1 touchdown. For UCLA, quarterback McLeod Bethel-Thompson went 11–27 for 154 yards and 1 touchdown and interception. The rushing game was led by Chris Markey who ran 27 times for 117 yards. This was the first time the Cougars gave up 100 yards rushing to a single player. Bethel-Thompson's favorite target was Brandon Breazell who caught 4 passes for 44 yards and 1 touchdown. The Bruins struck first with a 22-yard Kai Forbath field goal. A 29-yard field goal by BYU kicker Mitch Payne made it 3–3 after the 1st quarter. In the 2nd, Hall hooked up with Austin Collie for 14 yards and a touchdown to make it 10-3. Forbath then hit a 52-yard field goal to cut the lead to 10–6. With 1:03 left in the 1st half, Hall found Michael Reed for 13 yards and a touchdown. As time expired, Bethel-Thompson hit Breazell to make it 17–13 in favor of BYU at the end of the 2nd quarter. There was no scoring in the 3rd. In the 4th, Forbath made it 17–16 with a 50-yard field goal. BYU punted to UCLA with around 2 minutes left to set up a final drive for the Bruins. Bethel-Thompson, a fourth-string walk-on quarterback, along with Chris Markey drove to the BYU 49. On 3rd and 8 Bethel-Thompson hit Logan Paulsen to get to the BYU 13. That set up a chip-shot 28-yard field goal for Forbath, who already hit 2 50+ yarders. The kick was too low and Manumaleuna blocked it and sealed the game for the Cougars.

== Coaching staff ==
- Karl Dorrell – Head coach – 5th year
- Jay Norvell – Offensive coordinator / quarterbacks
- DeWayne Walker – Defensive coordinator / cornerbacks
- Jake Peetz — Defensive assistant
- Mike Rutenberg — Graduate assistant

== Bibliography ==
- UCLA Bruins football 2007 media guide (preseason information)
- UCLA Bruins football 2008 media guide (postseason information on the 2007 season)
