= Tyrone Willingham =

American football player and coach (born 1953)

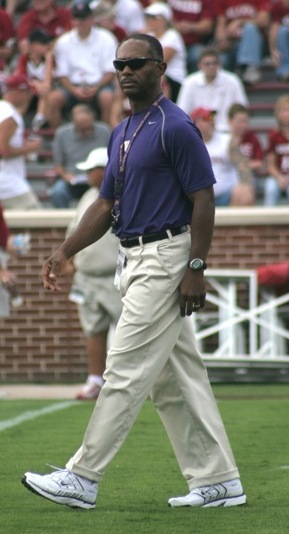
- Willingham in 2006

Biographical details
- Born: December 30, 1953 (age 72); Kinston, North Carolina, U.S.

Playing career
- 1973–1976: Michigan State
- Positions: Quarterback, wide receiver

Coaching career (HC unless noted)
- 1977: Michigan State (GA)
- 1978–1979: Central Michigan (DB)
- 1980–1982: Michigan State (DB/ST)
- 1983–1985: NC State (DB/ST)
- 1986–1988: Rice (WR/ST)
- 1989–1991: Stanford (RB)
- 1992–1994: Minnesota Vikings (RB)
- 1995–2001: Stanford
- 2002–2004: Notre Dame
- 2005–2008: Washington

Head coaching record
- Overall: 76–88–1
- Bowls: 1–4

Accomplishments and honors

Championships
- Pac-10 (1999)

Awards
- The Sporting News Sportsman of the Year (2002); George Munger Award (2002); Home Depot Coach of the Year Award (2002)

Lionel Tyrone Willingham (born December 30, 1953) is an American former football player and coach. He was the head coach at Stanford University (1995–2001), the University of Notre Dame (2002–2004), and the University of Washington (2005–2008), compiling a career college football record of 76–88–1.

== Early career ==
Willingham attended Jacksonville Senior High School in Jacksonville, North Carolina and lettered in football, basketball, and baseball. He went on to Michigan State University, where he played football and baseball and graduated in 1977 with a degree in physical education. Willingham held assistant coaching positions at his alma mater (1977, 1980–82), Central Michigan University (1978–79), North Carolina State University (1983–85), Rice University (1986–88), and Stanford University (1989–91). When Stanford head coach Dennis Green was hired as the Minnesota Vikings head coach in 1992, Willingham followed him as running backs coach (1992–94).

== Head coaching positions ==
=== Stanford ===
Following the 1994 season, despite having never been more than a position coach at any level, Willingham returned to Stanford as head coach, succeeding Bill Walsh. In his seven seasons (1995–2001) as coach, he led the Cardinal to a 44–36–1 record and four bowl game appearances. Notably, Willingham's teams went undefeated (7–0) against arch-rival California. In 2000, he was presented with the Eddie Robinson Coach of Distinction Award that is given annually to honor "an outstanding college football coach and role model for career achievement".

His best team was the 1999 team, which won the school's first outright Pacific-10 Conference title in 29 years and appeared in the 2000 Rose Bowl. Willingham's 44 wins were the most by a Stanford coach since John Ralston, who left the school for the Denver Broncos of the NFL after the 1971 season.

=== Notre Dame ===
==== 2002 ====
On December 31, 2001, Willingham was hired as head coach at Notre Dame. Willingham began the 2002 season by going 8–0, and went on to become the only first-year coach in Notre Dame history to win 10 games. For his efforts, he was named the SN Sportsman of the year, ESPN/Home Depot College Coach of the Year, the Scripps College Coach of the Year, the Black Coaches Association Male Coach of the Year, and the George Munger Award College Coach of the Year by the Maxwell Football Club.

In the 2002 regular-season finale, ND was blown out by arch-rival USC, 44–13, and was outgained 610–109—the worst such margin in school history. That loss knocked ND from a likely Bowl Championship Series berth down to the 2003 Gator Bowl—where they were beaten by North Carolina State, 28–6.

==== 2003 ====
The 2003 team finished 5–7 and was beaten badly in four of those losses, getting shut out twice in one season for the first time since 1960, including a 37–0 loss to Florida State and finishing with a point differential of 315-243 —the worst of any Fighting Irish team since 1956.

==== 2004 ====
In 2004, Notre Dame posted a 6–5 record in the regular season, including a 41–16 loss to Purdue (the second-worst home loss ever to Purdue) and ending with Willingham's third consecutive loss to USC for his fifth loss by 30 points or more, and eighth by 22 points or more, in his three seasons. The following Tuesday, November 30, after an overall record in South Bend of 21–15 (an 8–0 start followed by a 13-15 finish), Notre Dame terminated Willingham as head coach. Defensive coordinator Kent Baer served as acting head coach for the Insight Bowl, a 38–21 loss to Oregon State.

=== Washington ===
On December 13, 2004, Willingham was hired as the new head coach at Washington, succeeding Keith Gilbertson. The Huskies returned 19 of 22 starters from the previous season, in which they had gone 1–10 (0–8 in conference play).

Willingham's primary task was to change the program's image, which had been marred by off-the-field legal problems under Rick Neuheisel. He instituted a strict hair policy and was known to occasionally show up in his players' classes unannounced to make sure they were attending.

==== 2005 ====
Willingham faced his former team on September 24, 2005. Notre Dame prevailed, 36–17. His first season at Washington ended with a 2–9 record (1–7 in conference play, tied for 9th place), capped by a scuffle after a close loss to Washington State.

==== 2006 ====
His 2006 Washington team started October with a 4–1 record, with its most notable victory a stunning 29–19 upset over previously undefeated UCLA, before losing its next 6 games after starting quarterback Isaiah Stanback suffered a season-ending foot injury in a loss to Oregon State in their sixth game. The Huskies ended the season at 5–7 (3–6 in conference play, 9th place), this time defeating state rival Washington State (WSU) by three points. This win held WSU from defeating the Huskies for three consecutive seasons, something that has never happened in the history of the century-long rivalry.

==== 2007 ====
The 2007 Washington Huskies football team faced what a preseason CBS Sports opinion piece called "the toughest schedule in the country" Washington went on to a 4–9 record overall (2–7 in conference play, 10th place) with wins against Syracuse, Boise State, Stanford, and California. There was considerable debate after the season over whether Willingham should be fired as no other coach in the history of the program had ever tallied three straight losing seasons. Washington State won the Apple Cup again, making it three out of the last four. In the end, it was decided that he would return for the upcoming season with the expectation that the team become more competitive. Additionally, several boosters were pleased at Willingham's effort to clean up the program.

==== 2008 ====
Willingham's stiff demeanor resulted in a somewhat acrimonious relationship with fans, boosters, and the Seattle media. The turning point came at the end of his third (losing) season when there was a big question as to whether he would be retained. However, President Emmert gave him a vote of confidence and he was retained for a fourth year.

The 2008 season started off inauspiciously with #21 Oregon defeating Washington 44–10. This marked the first time Oregon had ever beaten Washington five consecutive times in the history of the century-long rivalry. The second game against #15 BYU was a nail biter and Washington scored the final touchdown in the final minute. The PAT would have tied the game, however an unsportsmanlike conduct penalty was called against quarterback Jake Locker who had thrown the ball up in the air in celebration after scoring the touchdown. This moved the PAT attempt to 35 yards which was blocked and BYU escaped with a 28–27 victory. In the next game, the Huskies were dismantled 55–14 by the #3 Oklahoma Sooners, giving the overmatched Huskies their greatest margin of defeat at home since 1929. In the fourth game, the Huskies lost to Stanford leaving them as the only winless team in a BCS conference. The Huskies were without a sack, leaving them as the only school without a sack at this point of the season. It was the second 0–4 start in the last five years and only the fourth time ever in the history of the program. Starting quarterback Jake Locker was lost for the season, injuring his left hand during a block on a reverse.

In the fifth game, Arizona put Washington away early and the game ended with a 48–14 wipeout of the Huskies. This was the biggest margin of victory by Arizona over Washington ever, and started a watch of just how bad the team could get. The Huskies had a flat performance in their sixth game to lose to Oregon State 34–13. This was the fifth consecutive loss to the Beavers, something that had never happened in the long history of the series. Game 7 was another loss versus his former team Notre Dame. The Huskies were nearly shutout in suffering a 33–7 loss that left them 0–7 and ineligible for a bowl game yet again. On October 27, 2008, seven games into the 2008 season, Willingham announced that his contract was being terminated and he would be leaving UW after the regular season. Game 8 was a shutout by USC.

At 0–11, Washington was the only winless team in the FBS, and the owner of a 13-game losing streak stretching from the last season. Washington closed out the season with a loss at 1–10 Washington State in double-overtime, making it four of the last five, and with a season-ending loss at California. Willingham finished the season with an 0–12 record, the Huskies' first winless season in 119 years, as well as the only winless season in the PAC-10, PAC-12 era.

== Post coaching career ==
In 2014, Willingham was named as a member of the College Football Playoff selection committee. Willingham also volunteered as a coach on the Stanford women's golf team in 2011. Willingham served as president on the American Football Coaches Association (AFCA) Board of Trustees in 2008. On July 18, 2010, at the age of 56 and nearly two years after he had coached his last game, Willingham announced he was retired from coaching.

== Personal life ==
Willingham is married and has three children.

== Head coaching record ==
Year	Team	Overall	Conference	Standing	Bowl/playoffs	Coaches^{#}	AP^{°}
Stanford Cardinal (Pacific-10 Conference) (1995–2001)
1995	Stanford	7–4–1	5–3	4th	L Liberty		
1996	Stanford	7–5	5–3	3rd	W Sun		
1997	Stanford	5–6	3–5	T–7th			
1998	Stanford	3–8	2–6	T–8th			
1999	Stanford	8–4	7–1	1st	L Rose^{†}	24	
2000	Stanford	5–6	4–4	4th			
2001	Stanford	9–3	6–2	T–2nd	L Seattle	17	16
Stanford:		44–36–1	32–24				
Notre Dame Fighting Irish (Independent) (2002–2004)
2002	Notre Dame	10–3			L Gator	17	17
2003	Notre Dame	5–7					
2004	Notre Dame	6–5*			Insight*		
Notre Dame:		21–15		*Fired before Insight Bowl			
Washington Huskies (Pacific-10 Conference) (2005–2009)
2005	Washington	2–9	1–7	10th			
2006	Washington	5–7	3–6	9th			
2007	Washington	4–9	2–7	10th			
2008	Washington	0–12	0–9	10th			
Washington:		11–37	6–29				
Total:		76–88–1					
National championship Conference title Conference division title or championship game berth
^{†}Indicates BCS bowl.; ^{#}Rankings from final Coaches Poll.; ^{°}Rankings from final AP Poll.
