= 2007 Washington Huskies football team =

American college football season

2007 Washington Huskies football
- Conference: Pacific-10 Conference
- Record: 4–9 (2–7 Pac-10)
- Head coach: Tyrone Willingham (3rd season)
- Offensive coordinator: Tim Lappano (3rd season)
- Offensive scheme: Spread
- Defensive coordinator: Kent Baer (3rd season)
- Base defense: 4–3
- MVPs: Louis Rankin (O); Daniel Te'o-Nesheim (D)
- Captains: Juan Garcia; Greyson Gunheim; Roy Lewis/Louis Rankin; Jordan Reffett/Anthony Russo
- Home stadium: Husky Stadium

2007 Pacific-10 Conference football standings
	Conf.			Overall
Team	W		L	W		L
No. 3 USC +	7	–	2	11	–	2
No. 16 Arizona State +	7	–	2	10	–	3
No. 25 Oregon State	6	–	3	9	–	4
No. 23 Oregon	5	–	4	9	–	4
UCLA	5	–	4	6	–	7
Arizona	4	–	5	5	–	7
California	3	–	6	7	–	6
Washington State	3	–	6	5	–	7
Stanford	3	–	6	4	–	8
Washington	2	–	7	4	–	9
+ – Conference co-champions; Rankings from AP Poll

The 2007 Washington Huskies football team represented the University of Washington in the 2007 NCAA Division I FBS football season. The team's head coach was Tyrone Willingham. It played its home games at Husky Stadium in Seattle, Washington, USA.

The 2007 Huskies' schedule was ranked as the most difficult in college football by Jeff Sagarin. The Huskies finished with a record of 4–9, their fourth straight losing season. This, combined with the 2007 team having the worst defense in school history, led to the firings of defensive coordinator Kent Baer and special teams coach Bob Simmons at the end of the season.

The Huskies were led by their redshirt freshman quarterback Jake Locker, who made his debut this season, throwing for over 2,000 yards and rushing for 986. Locker accounted for 27 touchdowns. Louis Rankin, who was named the team's offensive most valuable player, rushed for 1,294 yards.

== Schedule ==
Date	Time	Opponent	Site	TV	Result	Attendance
August 31	5:00 p.m.	at Syracuse*	Carrier Dome; Syracuse, NY	ESPN	W 42–12	40,329
September 8	12:30 p.m.	No. 20 Boise State*	Husky Stadium; Seattle, WA	FSN	W 24–10	70,045
September 15	12:30 p.m.	No. 10 Ohio State*	Husky Stadium; Seattle, WA	ESPN	L 14–33	74,927
September 22	7:30 p.m.	at UCLA	Rose Bowl; Pasadena, CA	FSN	L 31–44	72,124
September 29	5:00 p.m.	No. 1 USC	Husky Stadium; Seattle, WA	ABC	L 24–27	68,654
October 13	7:00 p.m.	at No. 14 Arizona State	Sun Devil Stadium; Tempe, AZ	FSN	L 20–44	64,347
October 20	4:30 p.m.	No. 7 Oregon	Husky Stadium; Seattle, WA (rivalry)	FSN	L 34–55	66,481
October 27	12:00 p.m.	Arizona^{†}	Husky Stadium; Seattle, WA	FSN	L 41–48	61,124
November 3	3:30 p.m.	at Stanford	Stanford Stadium; Stanford, CA	FSN	W 27–9	36,570
November 10	7:00 p.m.	at Oregon State	Reser Stadium; Corvallis, OR	FSN	L 23–29	45,629
November 17	12:30 p.m.	California	Husky Stadium; Seattle, WA	ABC	W 37–23	60,005
November 24	4:00 p.m.	Washington State	Husky Stadium; Seattle, WA (Apple Cup)	FSN	L 35–42	72,888
December 1	8:30 p.m.	at No. 10 Hawaii*	Aloha Stadium; Halawa, HI	ESPN2	L 28–35	50,000
*Non-conference game; ^{†}Homecoming; Rankings from AP Poll released prior to the game; All times are in Pacific time

== Personnel ==
2007 Washington Huskies football team roster
Players
Coaches
Offense

Pos.	#	Name	Class
QB		Jake Locker	Fr
		Louis Rankin
		Marcel Reece
		Anthony Russo

Defense

Pos.	#	Name	Class
S		Nate Williams	Fr

Special teams

Pos.	#	Name	Class
K		Ryan Perkins

Head coach

- Tyrone Willingham

Coordinators/assistant coaches

- Luke Huard
  Graduate assistant

Legend

- (C) Team captain
- (S) Suspended
- (I) Ineligible
- Injured
- Redshirt

== NFL draft ==
No Huskies were selected in the 2008 NFL draft, which lasted seven rounds (252 selections).
