= 2007 Washington State Cougars football team =

American college football season

2007 Washington State Cougars football
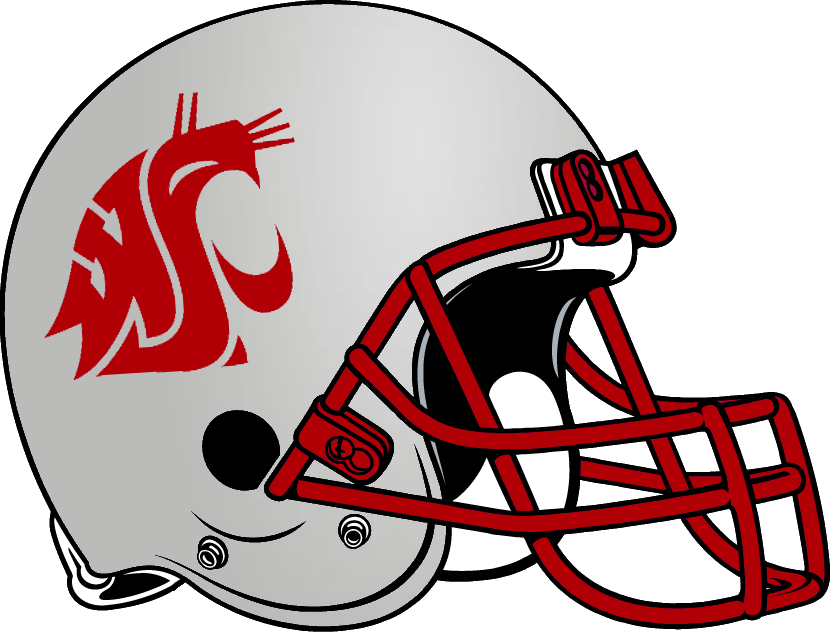
- Conference: Pacific-10 Conference
- Record: 5–7 (3–6 Pac-10)
- Head coach: Bill Doba (5th season)
- Offensive coordinator: Mike Levenseller (7th season)
- Offensive scheme: Spread
- Base defense: 4–3
- Captains: Husain Abdullah; Alex Brink; Michael Bumpus; Greg Trent
- Home stadium: Martin Stadium

2007 Pacific-10 Conference football standings
	Conf.			Overall
Team	W		L	W		L
No. 3 USC +	7	–	2	11	–	2
No. 16 Arizona State +	7	–	2	10	–	3
No. 25 Oregon State	6	–	3	9	–	4
No. 23 Oregon	5	–	4	9	–	4
UCLA	5	–	4	6	–	7
Arizona	4	–	5	5	–	7
California	3	–	6	7	–	6
Washington State	3	–	6	5	–	7
Stanford	3	–	6	4	–	8
Washington	2	–	7	4	–	9
+ – Conference co-champions; Rankings from AP Poll

The 2007 Washington State Cougars football team represented Washington State University in the 2007 NCAA Division I FBS football season. The team was led by fifth-year head coach Bill Doba and played its home games on campus at Martin Stadium in Pullman, with one at Qwest Field in Seattle.

The 2007 Apple Cup was played a week later than normal to allow for both Washington and Washington State to have a bye, as neither had one in 2006. This marked the first time the Apple Cup has been played after Thanksgiving since 1978.

Three days after leading the Cougars to a 42–35 victory in the Apple Cup, head coach Bill Doba was fired on November 26. Doba posted a 30–29 record during his 5 seasons as head coach; and led the Cougars to only 1 bowl game, a 28–20 victory over Texas in the Holiday Bowl in his first season.

== Schedule ==
Date	Time	Opponent	Site	TV	Result	Attendance
September 1	12:30 p.m.	at No. 7 Wisconsin*	Camp Randall Stadium; Madison, Wisconsin	ABC	L 21–42	81,547
September 8	4:00 p.m.	San Diego State*	Qwest Field; Seattle (Cougar Gridiron Classic)		W 45–17	46,290
September 15	7:00 p.m.	Idaho*	Martin Stadium; Pullman, Washington (Battle of the Palouse)	FSNNW	W 45–28	32,064
September 22	5:00 p.m.	at No. 1 USC	Memorial Coliseum; Los Angeles	ABC	L 14–47	86,876
September 29	7:00 p.m.	at Arizona	Arizona Stadium; Tucson, Arizona	FSNNW	L 20–48	50,945
October 6	1:00 p.m.	No. 18 Arizona State^{†}	Martin Stadium; Pullman, Washington	FSN	L 20–23	35,117
October 13	12:30 p.m.	at No. 8 Oregon	Autzen Stadium; Eugene, Oregon		L 7–53	58,749
October 27	3:30 p.m.	UCLA	Martin Stadium; Pullman, Washington	FSN	W 27–7	31,027
November 3	7:00 p.m.	at California	Memorial Stadium; Berkeley, California	FSN	L 17–20	55,711
November 10	3:30 p.m.	Stanford	Martin Stadium; Pullman, Washington	FSNNW	W 33–17	31,110
November 17	3:30 p.m.	Oregon State	Martin Stadium; Pullman, Washington	FSNNW	L 17–52	22,660
November 24	4:00 p.m.	at Washington	Husky Stadium; Seattle, Washington (Apple Cup)	FSN	W 42–35	72,888
*Non-conference game; ^{†}Homecoming; Rankings from Coaches' Poll released prior to the game; All times are in Pacific time

== Game summaries ==
=== Wisconsin ===
Team	1	2	3	4	Total
Washington State	14	0	7	0	21
• Wisconsin	14	14	0	14	42

- Date: September 1
- Location: Camp Randall Stadium, Madison, Wisconsin

=== San Diego State ===
Team	1	2	3	4	Total
San Diego St	10	0	0	7	17
• Washington State	10	14	14	7	45

- Date: September 8
- Location: Qwest Field, Seattle

=== Idaho ===
Team	1	2	3	4	Total
Idaho	14	7	7	0	28
• Washington State	7	24	7	7	45

- Date: September 15
- Location: Martin Stadium, Pullman, Washington

=== USC ===
Team	1	2	3	4	Total
Washington State	7	0	7	0	14
• USC	14	13	13	7	47

- Date: September 22
- Location: Los Angeles Memorial Coliseum, Los Angeles

=== Arizona ===
Team	1	2	3	4	Total
Washington State	7	6	7	0	20
• Arizona	10	10	14	14	48

- Date: September 29
- Location: Arizona Stadium, Tucson, Arizona

=== Arizona State ===
Team	1	2	3	4	Total
• Arizona State	0	7	13	3	23
Washington State	0	10	7	3	20

- Date: October 6
- Location: Martin Stadium, Pullman, Washington

=== Oregon ===
Team	1	2	3	4	Total
Washington State	0	0	7	0	7
• Oregon	17	23	10	3	53

- Date: October 13
- Location: Autzen Stadium, Eugene, Oregon

=== UCLA ===
Team	1	2	3	4	Total
UCLA	7	0	0	0	7
• Washington State	10	0	3	14	27

- Date: October 27
- Location: Martin Stadium, Pullman, Washington

=== California ===
Team	1	2	3	4	Total
Washington State	0	0	6	11	17
• California	7	3	3	7	20

- Date: November 3
- Location: California Memorial Stadium, Berkeley, California

=== Stanford ===
Team	1	2	3	4	Total
Stanford	0	0	17	0	17
• Washington State	3	7	10	13	33

- Date: November 10
- Location: Martin Stadium, Pullman, Washington

=== Oregon State ===
Team	1	2	3	4	Total
• Oregon State	21	10	7	14	52
Washington State	0	3	7	7	17

- Date: November 17
- Location: Martin Stadium, Pullman, Washington

=== Washington ===
Washington State Cougars (4–7) at Washington Huskies (4–7)

Quarter	1	2	3	4	Total
Washington St	7	14	7	14	42
Washington	10	10	8	7	35

at Husky Stadium • Seattle, Washington

- Date: November 24
- Game time: 4:00 p.m. PDT
- Game weather: Cloudy • 45 °F (7 °C) • Wind —
- Game attendance: 72,888
- Referee: Jack Wood
- Box Score

Game information

Washington St

- Alex Brink
  27/40, 399 yds, 5 TD
- Chris Ivory
  14 rush, 114 yds, TD
- Brandon Gibson
  6 rec, 137 yds, 2 TD

Washington

- Jake Locker
  12/35, 224 yds, TD, 2 int
  14 rush, 103 yds, 2 TD
- Anthony Russo
  5 rec, 101 yds

100th Apple Cup

Scoring summary

Quarter	Time	Drive			Team	Scoring information	Score	
Quarter	Time	Plays	Yards	TOP	Team	Scoring information	WSU	WASH
1	14:45				Washington	Kickoff returned 89 yards for touchdown by Rankin, Perkins kick good	0	7
1	8:37	10	45	3:54	Washington	35-yard field goal by Perkins	0	10
1	1:04	3	80	0:59	Washington St	Frischknecht 41-yard touchdown reception from Brink, Abdollmohammadi kick good	7	10
2	12:35	8	55	3:22	Washington	Locker 23-yard touchdown run, Perkins kick good	7	17
2	5:58	5	86	1:13	Washington St	Ivory 25-yard touchdown run, Abdollmohammadi kick good	14	17
2	3:22	8	43	2:03	Washington	43-yard field goal by Perkins	14	20
2	0:34	10	79	2:39	Washington St	Frischknecht 19-yard touchdown reception from Brink, Abdollmohammadi kick good	21	20
3	9:11	5	57	1:50	Washington St	Anderson 28-yard touchdown reception from Brink, Abdollmohammadi kick good	28	20
3	5:14	4	90	1:26	Washington	Reece 53-yard touchdown reception from Locker, 2-point pass good	28	28
4	12:18	16	73	7:20	Washington	Locker 1-yard touchdown run, Perkins kick good	28	35
4	7:29	3	81	0:51	Washington St	Gibson 40-yard touchdown reception from Brink, Abdollmohammadi kick good	35	35
4	0:31	7	84	1:47	Washington St	Gibson 35-yard touchdown reception from Brink, Abdollhmohammadi kick good	42	35
"TOP" = time of possession. For other American football terms, see Glossary of American football.							42	35

== Personnel ==
2007 Washington State Cougars football team roster
Players
Coaches
Offense

Pos.	#	Name	Class
		Jeshua Anderson
QB		Alex Brink
		Michael Bumpus
TE		Devin Frischknecht
WR		Brandon Gibson
RB		Chris Ivory

Defense

Pos.	#	Name	Class
		Alfonso Jackson

Special teams

Pos.	#	Name	Class
K		Romeen Abdollmohammadi

Head coach

- Bill Doba

Coordinators/assistant coaches

- Mike Levenseller (OC)
- Timm Rosenbach (QB)

Legend

- (C) Team captain
- (S) Suspended
- (I) Ineligible
- Injured
- Redshirt
