= 2007 Stanford vs. USC football game =

- Conference game
Stanford Cardinal	USC Trojans
(1–3)	(4–0)
24	23
Head coach: Jim Harbaugh	Head coach: Pete Carroll
	AP / Coaches; 2 / 1
	1	2	3	4	Total
Stanford	0	0	7	17	24
USC	3	6	7	7	23
- Date: October 6, 2007
- Season: 2007
- Stadium: Los Angeles Memorial Coliseum
- Location: Los Angeles, California
- Favorite: USC by 41
- National anthem: Spirit of Troy
- Referee: Michael Batlan
- Halftime show: Stanford Band; Spirit of Troy
- Attendance: 85,125

United States TV coverage
- Network: Versus
- Announcers: Ron Thulin (play-by-play); Kelly Stouffer (analyst); Lewis Johnson (sideline)

The 2007 Stanford vs. USC football game was an NCAA college football game held on October 6, 2007, at the Los Angeles Memorial Coliseum in Los Angeles, California. In a remarkable upset, the visiting Stanford Cardinal won 24–23 despite USC having been favored by 41 points entering the game. This result was the biggest point spread upset of all time in college football (since surpassed by the Howard University Bison in 2017, who were 45-point underdogs heading into a road game against the UNLV Rebels). USC entered the game with a 35-game home game winning streak (its previous home game loss also happened to be to Stanford, in 2001) which included a 24-game home game winning streak in Pac-10 play. By contrast, Stanford had compiled a Pac-10 worst 1–11 season in 2006, which included a 42–0 loss to USC. To compound the situation, Stanford's starting quarterback T. C. Ostrander had suffered a seizure the week before and his replacement, backup quarterback Tavita Pritchard, had never started a game and had thrown just three passes in official play.

== Game summary ==
The weather was sunny and 74 °F (23 °C) with a slight west wind. The game began at 4:09pm Pacific Daylight Time and ended at 7:36pm.

=== Scoring ===
==== First quarter ====
- 06:25 USC – David Buehler 34 yd field goal USC 3–0

==== Second quarter ====
- 07:15 USC – Chauncey Washington 1 yd run (PAT blocked) USC 9–0

==== Third quarter ====
- 11:58 Stanford – Austin Yancy 31 yd interception return (Derek Belch kick) USC 9–7
- 02:54 USC – Fred Davis 63 yd pass from John David Booty (David Buehler kick) USC 16–7

==== Fourth quarter ====
- 14:54 Stanford – Anthony Kimble 1 yd run (Derek Belch kick) USC 16–14
- 11:04 USC – Ronald Johnson 47 yd pass from John David Booty (David Buehler kick) USC 23–14
- 05:43 Stanford – Derek Belch 26 yd field goal USC 23–17
- 00:48 Stanford – Mark Bradford 10 yd pass from Tavita Pritchard on fourth down and goal (Derek Belch kick) Stanford 24–23.

The game-winning drive featured a 20-yard pass from Tavita Pritchard to Richard Sherman on fourth-and-20 from the USC 29.

== Aftermath ==
USC fell to No. 10 in the AP Poll and No. 7 in the Coaches' Poll after the loss.

The final score was announced at the Rose Bowl, where USC's two arch-rivals, UCLA and Notre Dame, were playing each other. Irish and Bruins fans cheered in unison and celebrated together briefly. At the same time, at Tiger Stadium, the #1 LSU Tigers were playing the #9 Florida Gators and the fans in the stadium celebrated when the USC score was announced there, too. The Tigers would later come from behind to beat the Gators 28–24, making them #1 in both polls with USC dropping from #1 in the coaches poll due to the loss.

Stanford's victory, for once, was cheered on by perennial rival Cal, who was ranked No. 3 in the nation at the time of USC's loss. USC's loss elevated California to its highest ranking in nearly six decades, and it was primed to reach the #1 ranking for the first time since 1951 when #1 LSU was beaten in overtime by Kentucky the same day it played Oregon State. California lost the Oregon State game; after starting the season 5-0 and ranked No. 12, it finished 7-6 and unranked. 2007 was also the only game in an eight year Big Game stretch that it lost to Stanford.

At the end of the regular season, Sports Illustrated chose the Stanford upset of USC as the second "Biggest Upset of 2007" after Division I FCS Appalachian State's 34–32 upset of #5 Michigan.

In 1979, Stanford had pulled a similar feat by coming back in the last four minutes to tie USC 21–21 on October 13. This game, considered one of the greatest of the 20th century, effectively cost USC a national championship.

In the 2009 season, Stanford would eclipse the point spread by handing USC its worst defeat ever. Stanford won 55–21, and USC was an 11-point favorite. The next year in 2010, tenth-ranked Stanford defeated USC with a last-second field goal to win, 37–35. In 2011, Stanford would again defeat USC, continuing a 3-game streak of defeating USC at their home stadium. In a much closer game, Stanford defeated USC 56–48 in triple overtime. In the following year, the Cardinal again faced a second-ranked USC team and defeated them 21–14, earning a fourth consecutive win over the Trojans, a first in team and school history.

== See also ==
- 2007 NCAA Division I FBS football season
- 2007 Appalachian State vs. Michigan football game
- Pete Carroll–Jim Harbaugh rivalry
