= 2007 Arizona State Sun Devils football team =

American college football season

2007 Arizona State Sun Devils football

Pac-10 co-champion

Holiday Bowl, L 34–52 vs. Texas
- Conference: Pacific-10 Conference

Ranking
- Coaches: No. 13
- AP: No. 16
- Record: 10–3 (7–2 Pac-10)
- Head coach: Dennis Erickson (1st season)
- Offensive coordinator: Rich Olson (1st season)
- Offensive scheme: Spread
- Defensive coordinator: Craig Bray (1st season)
- Base defense: 4–3
- Captains: Josh Barrett; Michael Marquardt; Mike Pollak; Ryan Torain
- Home stadium: Sun Devil Stadium

Uniform

2007 Pacific-10 Conference football standings
	Conf.			Overall
Team	W		L	W		L
No. 3 USC +	7	–	2	11	–	2
No. 16 Arizona State +	7	–	2	10	–	3
No. 25 Oregon State	6	–	3	9	–	4
No. 23 Oregon	5	–	4	9	–	4
UCLA	5	–	4	6	–	7
Arizona	4	–	5	5	–	7
California	3	–	6	7	–	6
Washington State	3	–	6	5	–	7
Stanford	3	–	6	4	–	8
Washington	2	–	7	4	–	9
+ – Conference co-champions; Rankings from AP Poll

The 2007 Arizona State Sun Devils football team represented Arizona State University as a member of the Pacific-10 Conference (Pac-10) during the 2007 NCAA Division I FBS football season. Led by first-year head coach Dennis Erickson, the Sun Devils compiled an overall record of 10–3 with a mark of 7–2 in conference play, sharing the Pac-10 title with USC. Arizona State was invited to the Holiday Bowl, where the Sun Devils lost 52–34 to Texas. The team played home games at Sun Devil Stadium in Tempe, Arizona.

== Schedule ==
Date	Time	Opponent	Rank	Site	TV	Result	Attendance
September 1	7:00 pm	San Jose State*		Sun Devil Stadium; Tempe, AZ		W 45–3	54,405
September 8	7:15 pm	Colorado*		Sun Devil Stadium; Tempe, AZ	FSN	W 33–14	58,417
September 15	7:00 pm	San Diego State*		Sun Devil Stadium; Tempe, AZ	FSNAZ	W 34–13	54,617
September 22	7:00 pm	Oregon State		Sun Devil Stadium; Tempe, AZ		W 44–32	56,099
September 29	7:00 pm	at Stanford	No. 23	Stanford Stadium; Stanford, CA	FSNAZ	W 41–3	32,125
October 6	1:00 pm	at Washington State	No. 18	Martin Stadium; Pullman, WA	FSN	W 23–20	35,117
October 13	7:15 pm	Washington	No. 14	Sun Devil Stadium; Tempe, AZ	FSN	W 44–20	64,347
October 27	7:00 pm	No. 18 California^{†}	No. 7	Sun Devil Stadium; Tempe, AZ	FSN	W 31–20	71,706
November 3	3:30 pm	at No. 4 Oregon	No. 6	Autzen Stadium; Eugene, OR (College GameDay)	ESPN	L 23–35	59,379
November 10	1:30 pm	at UCLA	No. 9	Rose Bowl; Pasadena, CA	ABC	W 24–20	78,690
November 22	6:00 pm	No. 11 USC	No. 7	Sun Devil Stadium; Tempe, AZ	ESPN	L 24–44	71,706
December 1	6:00 pm	Arizona	No. 13	Sun Devil Stadium; Tempe, AZ (rivalry)	ESPN2	W 20–17	71,706
December 27	7:00 pm	vs. No. 17 Texas*	No. 12	Qualcomm Stadium; San Diego, CA (Holiday Bowl)	ESPN	L 34–52	64,020
*Non-conference game; ^{†}Homecoming; Rankings from AP Poll released prior to the game; All times are in Mountain time

== Rankings ==
Ranking movements Legend: ██ Increase in ranking ██ Decrease in ranking RV = Received votes
	Week															
Poll	Pre	1	2	3	4	5	6	7	8	9	10	11	12	13	14	Final
AP	RV	RV	RV	RV	23	18	14	12	7	6	9	9	7	13	12	16
Coaches	RV	RV	RV	RV	25	19	13	12	7	6	9	8	6	13	11	13
Harris	Not released				23	19	14	12	8	6	9	8	6	13	12	Not released
BCS	Not released							8	4	4	9	8	6	13	11	Not released

== Game summaries ==
=== San Jose State ===
Team	1	2	3	4	Total
San Jose State	3	0	0	3	6
• Arizona St	10	21	7	7	45

- Date: Saturday, September 1
- Location: Sun Devil Stadium, Tempe, Arizona

=== Colorado ===
Team	1	2	3	4	Total
Colorado	14	0	0	0	14
• Arizona St	0	19	14	0	33

- Date: Saturday, September 8
- Location: Sun Devil Stadium, Tempe, Arizona

=== San Diego State ===
Team	1	2	3	4	Total
San Diego St	3	7	3	0	13
• Arizona St	14	10	7	3	34

- Date: Saturday, September 15
- Location: Sun Devil Stadium, Tempe, Arizona

=== Oregon State ===
Team	1	2	3	4	Total
Oregon St	19	0	7	6	32
• Arizona St	0	13	14	17	44

- Date: Saturday, September 22
- Location: Sun Devil Stadium, Tempe, Arizona

=== Stanford ===
Team	1	2	3	4	Total
• Arizona St	6	15	6	14	41
Stanford	0	3	0	0	3

- Date: Saturday, September 29
- Location: Stanford Stadium, Stanford, California

=== Washington State ===
Team	1	2	3	4	Total
• Arizona St	0	7	13	3	23
Washington St	0	10	7	3	20

- Date: Saturday, October 6
- Location: Martin Stadium, Pullman, Washington

=== Washington ===
Team	1	2	3	4	Total
Washington	7	10	0	3	20
• Arizona St	3	10	21	10	44

- Date: Saturday, October 13
- Location: Sun Devil Stadium, Tempe, Arizona

=== California ===
Team	1	2	3	4	Total
California	13	7	0	0	20
• Arizona St	0	14	10	7	31

- Date: October 27
- Location: Sun Devil Stadium • Tempe, Arizona
- Game start: 10:15 p.m. EST

Scoring summary
1	9:54	CAL	Cameron Jordan 13-yard fumble return (Jordan Kay kick)	California 7–0
1	7:02	CAL	Jordan Kay 41-yard field goal	California 10–0
1	1:13	CAL	Jordan Kay 22-yard field goal	California 13–0
2	13:48	ASU	Dimitri Nance 11-yard run (Thomas Weber kick)	California 13–7
2	9:32	CAL	DeSean Jackson 21-yard pass from Nate Longshore (Jordan Kay kick)	California 20–7
2	3:42	ASU	Dimitri Nance 2-yard run (Thomas Weber kick)	California 20–14
3	10:03	ASU	Dimitri Nance 8-yard run (Thomas Weber kick)	Arizona St 21–20
3	1:16	ASU	Thomas Weber 47-yard field goal	Arizona St 24–20
4	7:07	ASU	Kyle Williams 12-yard pass from Rudy Carpenter (Thomas Weber kick)	Arizona St 31–20

=== Oregon ===
Team	1	2	3	4	Total
Arizona St	3	10	3	7	23
• Oregon	14	7	14	0	35

- Date: Saturday, November 3
- Location: Autzen Stadium, Eugene, Oregon

=== UCLA ===
Team	1	2	3	4	Total
• Arizona St	0	10	14	0	24
UCLA	10	3	7	0	20

- Date: Saturday, November 10
- Location: Rose Bowl, Pasadena, California

=== USC ===
Team	1	2	3	4	Total
• USC	17	10	17	0	44
Arizona St	14	3	0	7	24

- Date: Thursday, November 22
- Location: Sun Devil Stadium, Tempe, Arizona

=== Arizona ===
Team	1	2	3	4	Total
Arizona	7	0	0	10	17
• Arizona St	0	10	3	7	20

- Date: Saturday, December 1
- Location: Sun Devil Stadium, Tempe, Arizona
- Game start: 8:00 p.m. EST

Scoring summary
1	7:35	Arizona	Rob Gronkowski 1-yard pass from Willie Tuitama (Jason Bondzio kick)	Arizona 7–0
2	10:06	Arizona St	Tyrice Thompson 3-yard pass from Rudy Carpenter (Thomas Weber kick)	Tie 7–7
2	3:06	Arizona St	Thomas Weber 19-yard field goal	Arizona St 10–7
3	11:41	Arizona St	Thomas Weber 21-yard field goal	Arizona St 13–7
4	8:47	Arizona	Jason Bondzio 31-yard field goal	Arizona St 13–10
4	4:27	Arizona St	Michael Jones 20-yard pass from Rudy Carpenter (Thomas Weber kick)	Arizona St 20–10
4	0:26	Arizona	Nic Grigsby 4-yard pass from Willie Tuitama (Jason Bondzio kick)	Arizona St 20–17

=== Texas ===
Team	1	2	3	4	Total
Arizona St	0	10	10	14	34
• Texas	21	7	7	17	52

- Date: Thursday, December 27
- Location: Qualcomm Stadium, San Diego, California

== Roster ==
Wide receiver

- 1 Michael Jones – (redshirt) Jr.
- 3 Rudy Burgess – (redshirt) Sr.
- 5 Kerry Taylor – Fr.
- 6 Kyle Williams – So.
- 9 Brandon Smith – (redshirt) So.
- 10 Jeff Gray – (redshirt) Sr.
- 11 D.J. Tatum – Jr.
- 13 Chris McGaha – (redshirt) So.
- 16 Nate Kimbrough – (redshirt) Jr.
- 21 Rodney Glass – (redshirt) Fr.
- 81 Tyrice Thompson – (redshirt) Grad.
- 86 T.J. Simpson – Fr.

Tight end

- 80 Dane Guthrie – (redshirt) Jr.
- 82 Lance Evbuomwan – (redshirt) Fr.
- 83 Brady Conrad – Sr.
- 84 Jovon Williams – (redshirt) So.
- 87 Brent Miller – (redshirt) Sr.
- 88 Andrew Pettes – (redshirt) Jr.
- 89 James Fox – Fr.

Offensive line

- 52 Garth Gerhart – Fr.
- 56 Thomas Altieri – (redshirt) So.
- 62 Brandon Rodd – (redshirt) Grad.
- 63 Paul Fanaika – (redshirt) Jr.
- 65 Ian Scheuring – (redshirt) Fr.
- 66 Matt Hustad – Fr.
- 67 Shawn Lauvao – (redshirt) So.
- 70 Mike Marcisz – Fr.
- 72 Po'u Palelei – Fr.
- 73 Robert Gustavis – (redshirt) Grad.
- 75 Richard Tuitu'u – (redshirt) So.
- 76 Mike Pollak – (redshirt) Grad.
- 77 Adam Tello – Fr.
- 78 Zach Krula – (redshirt) Grad.
- 79 Julius Orieukwu – (redshirt) Grad.

Quarterback

- 7 Samson Szakacsy – Fr.
- 8 Chasen Stangel – Fr.
- 12 Rudy Carpenter – (redshirt) Jr.

Running back

- 20 Jarrell Woods – (redshirt) So.
- 21 Preston Jones – (redshirt) Sr.
- 24 Keegan Herring – Jr.
- 26 Ryan Torain – Sr.
- 31 Dimitri Nance – So.
- 36 Shaun DeWitty – Jr.

Defensive line

- 34 James Brooks – Fr. (redshirt)
- 54 Paul Unga – Jr.
- 55 Wes Evans – (redshirt) Jr.
- 57 Tranell Morant – (redshirt) Sr.
- 58 Dexter Davis – (redshirt) So.
- 59 Jon Hargis – (redshirt) Fr.
- 60 Edward James – Sr
- 61 Bo Moos – Fr.
- 71 Saia Falahola – (redshirt) Fr.
- 77 Michael Marquardt – (redshirt) Sr.
- 85 Kellen Mills – (redshirt) Sr.
- 90 David Smith – (redshirt) Jr.
- 93 Tashaka Merriweather – (redshirt) Sr.
- 94 Alex Asi – (redshirt) Jr.
- 95 Eric Tanner – Jr.
- 96 Zach Niusulu – (redshirt) Fr.
- 97 Luis Vasquez – (redshirt) Jr.
- 99 Jonathan English – Fr.

Defensive back

- 4 Justin Tryon – Sr.
- 5 Chad Green – (redshirt) Sr.
- 6 Grant Crunkleton – (redshirt) So.
- 7 Jeremy Payton – (redshirt) Jr.
- 8 Jarrell Holman – Jr.
- 9 Littrele Jones – (redshirt) Grad.
- 14 Troy Nolan – (redshirt) Jr.
- 15 Angelo Fobbs-Valentino – (redshirt) Jr.
- 17 Travis Smith – (redshirt) So.
- 18 Oliver Aaron – Fr.
- 19 Josh Barrett – (redshirt) Grad.
- 20 Jonathan Clark – Fr.
- 21 Colin Parker – Fr.
- 22 Rodney Cox – (redshirt) Jr.
- 23 Chris Baloney – (redshirt) Sr.
- 32 Omar Bolden – Fr.
- 37 Mike Callaghan – (redshirt) Fr.
- 39 Brett Nenaber – (redshirt) Sr.

Linebacker

- 25 Mike Nixon – So.
- 29 Robert James – (redshirt) Sr.
- 30 Derrall Anderson – Fr.
- 41 Antone Saulsberry – (redshirt) Jr.
- 43 Anthony Reyes – (redshirt) Jr.
- 44 Travis Goethel – So.
- 45 Jamarr Robinson – (redshirt) Fr.
- 46 Jeff Bereuter – (redshirt) Fr.
- 47 Gerald Munns – So.
- 48 Chad Lindsey – (redshirt) So.
- 49 Garrett Juday – (redshirt) Jr.
- 52 Morris Wooten – (redshirt) Jr.

Long snapper

- 51 Clay Davie – Fr.
- 53 Jason Perkins – (redshirt) Jr.

Kicker / Punter

- 28 Thomas Weber – (redshirt) Fr.
- 35 Jonathan Johnson – Sr.
