= 2007 Arizona Wildcats football team =

American college football season

2007 Arizona Wildcats football
- Conference: Pacific-10 Conference
- Record: 5–7 (4–5 Pac-10)
- Head coach: Mike Stoops (4th season)
- Offensive coordinator: Sonny Dykes (1st season)
- Offensive scheme: Air raid
- Defensive coordinator: Mark Stoops (4th season)
- Base defense: 4–3
- Captains: Eben Britton; Antoine Cason; Anthony Johnson; Spencer Larsen; Willie Tuitama
- Home stadium: Arizona Stadium

2007 Pacific-10 Conference football standings
	Conf.			Overall
Team	W		L	W		L
No. 3 USC +	7	–	2	11	–	2
No. 16 Arizona State +	7	–	2	10	–	3
No. 25 Oregon State	6	–	3	9	–	4
No. 23 Oregon	5	–	4	9	–	4
UCLA	5	–	4	6	–	7
Arizona	4	–	5	5	–	7
California	3	–	6	7	–	6
Washington State	3	–	6	5	–	7
Stanford	3	–	6	4	–	8
Washington	2	–	7	4	–	9
+ – Conference co-champions; Rankings from AP Poll

The 2007 Arizona Wildcats football team represented the University of Arizona as a member of the Pacific-10 Conference (Pac-10) during the 2007 NCAA Division I FBS football season. Led by fourth-year head coach Mike Stoops, the Wildcats compiled an overall record of 5–7 with a mark of 4–5 in conference play, placing sixth in the Pac-10. The team played home games at Arizona Stadium in Tucson, Arizona.

== Schedule ==
Date	Time	Opponent	Site	TV	Result	Attendance	Source
September 1	3:30 p.m.	at BYU*	LaVell Edwards Stadium; Provo, UT	Versus	L 7–20	64,525	
September 8	7:00 p.m.	Northern Arizona*	Arizona Stadium; Tucson, AZ		W 45–24	52,638	
September 16	7:00 p.m.	New Mexico*	Arizona Stadium; Tucson, AZ (rivalry)	FSNAZ	L 27–29	51,996	
September 22	3:00 p.m.	at No. 8 California	California Memorial Stadium; Berkeley, CA	Versus	L 27–45	56,021	
September 29	7:00 p.m.	Washington State	Arizona Stadium; Tucson, AZ	FSNAZ	W 48–20	50,945	
October 6	1:05 p.m.	at Oregon State	Reser Stadium; Corvallis, OR		L 16–31	40,489	
October 13	12:30 p.m.	at No. 10 USC	Los Angeles Memorial Coliseum; Los Angeles, CA	ABC	L 13–20	84,671	
October 20	4:00 p.m.	Stanford	Arizona Stadium; Tucson, AZ		L 20–21	55,270	
October 27	Noon	at Washington	Husky Stadium; Seattle, WA	FSNAZ	W 48–41	61,124	
November 3	12:30 p.m.	UCLA^{†}	Arizona Stadium; Tucson, AZ	ABC	W 34–27	51,727	
November 15	7:00 p.m.	No. 2 Oregon	Arizona Stadium; Tucson, AZ	ESPN	W 34–24	50,387	
December 1	6:00 p.m.	at No. 13 Arizona State	Sun Devil Stadium; Tempe, AZ (rivalry)	ESPN2	L 17–20	71,706	
*Non-conference game; ^{†}Homecoming; Rankings from AP Poll released prior to the game; All times are in Mountain time

== Game summaries ==
=== Oregon ===
Team	1	2	3	4	Total
Oregon	11	3	3	7	24
• Arizona	10	21	0	3	34

- Date: November 15
- Location: Arizona Stadium, Tucson, Arizona
- Game start: 9:00 p.m. EST

Scoring summary
1	12:24	ORE	Dennis Dixon 39-yard run (Ed Dickson run)	ORE 8-0
1	8:13	ARIZ	Mike Thomas 34-yard pass from Willie Tuitama (Jason Bondzio kick)	ORE 8-7
1	5:00	ORE	Matt Evensen 34-yard field goal	ORE 11-7
1	1:22	ARIZ	Jason Bondzio 32-yard field goal	ORE 11-10
2	14:45	ARIZ	Antoine Cason 42-yard interception return (Jason Bondzio kick)	ARIZ 17-11
2	11:34	ARIZ	Mike Thomas 46-yard pass from Willie Tuitama (Jason Bondzio kick)	ARIZ 24-11
2	5:30	ARIZ	Antoine Cason 56-yard punt return (Jason Bondzio kick)	ARIZ 31-11
2	0:09	ORE	Matt Evensen 32-yard field goal	ARIZ 31-14
3	9:10	ORE	Matt Evensen 34-yard field goal	ARIZ 31-17
4	7:53	ORE	Andre Crenshaw 2-yard run (Matt Evensen kick)	ARIZ 31-24
4	3:20	ARIZ	Jason Bondzio 46-yard field goal	ARIZ 34-24

== Roster ==
Player	Class	Pos	Summary
Willie Tuitama*	JR	QB	327 Cmp, 524 Att, 3683 Yds, 28 TD
Kris Heavner	SR	QB	5 Cmp, 6 Att, 19 Yds, 0 TD
Tyler Lyon	FR	QB	
Nic Grigsby*	FR	RB	161 Att, 704 Yds, 4.4 Avg
Brandon Lopez	JR	RB	
Chris Jennings	SR	RB	53 Att, 156 Yds, 2.9 Avg
Xavier Smith	SO	RB	26 Att, 107 Yds, 4.1 Avg
Earl Mitchell	SO	RB	5 Rec, 38 Yds, 7.6 Avg
Mike Thomas*	JR	WR	83 Rec, 1038 Yds, 12.5 Avg
Terrell Turner*	SO	WR	50 Rec, 575 Yds, 11.5 Avg
Anthony Johnson	SR	WR	35 Rec, 410 Yds, 11.7 Avg
Michael Turner	FR	WR	3 Rec, 10 Yds, 3.3 Avg
Delashaun Dean	FR	WR	37 Rec, 418 Yds, 11.3 Avg
Terrell Reese	FR	WR	20 Rec, 202 Yds, 10.1 Avg
B.J. Dennard	JR	WR	5 Rec, 38 Yds, 7.6 Avg
Derick Barkum		WR	2 Rec, 7 Yds, 3.5 Avg
Rob Gronkowski*	FR	TE	28 Rec, 525 Yds, 18.8 Avg
A.J. Simmons	FR	TE	1 Rec, 3 Yds, 3.0 Avg
Colin Baxter*	FR	OL	
Eben Britton*	SO	OL	
Peter Graniello*		OL	
Blake Kerley*		OL	
Joe Longacre*		OL	
Garon McHone	SR	OL	
Daniel Borg		OL	
Justin Jabali	SR	OL	
Jason Bondzio	JR	K	
Yaniv Barnett*	SR	DL	
Lionel Dotson*	SR	DL	
Louis Holmes*	SR	DL	
Jason Parker*	SR	DL	
Ricky Elmore	FR	DL	
Donald Horton Jr.	SO	DL	
Lolomana Mikaele	FR	DL	
Brooks Reed	FR	DL	
D'Aundre Reed	FR	DL	
Kaniela Tuipulotu	FR	DL	
Johnathan Turner	SR	DL	
Dane Krogstad*	SR	LB	
Spencer Larsen*	SR	LB	
Ronnie Palmer*	JR	LB	
James Alford	JR	LB	
Xavier Kelley	SO	LB	
Adrian McCovy	JR	LB	
Cam Nelson*	SO	DB	
Antoine Cason*	SR	DB	
Wilrey Fontenot*	SR	DB	
Corey Hall*	JR	DB	
Trevor Foster	FR	DB	
Marqus Hundley	JR	DB	
Michael Klyce	JR	DB	
Dominic Patrick	SR	DB	
Brandon Tatum	SO	DB	
Nate Ness	JR	DB	
Devin Ross	SO	DB	
Devon Ross		DB	
Keenyn Crier	FR	P	

== Awards ==
K Jason Bondzio

- All-Pacific-10 (Honorable Mention)

OT Eben Britton

- All-Pacific-10 (2nd team)

CB Antoine Cason

- All-American (consensus 1st team: Walter Camp, AP, TSN, CBS Sports, ESPN.com, Rivals.com, SI.com, CollegeFootballNews)
- All-Pacific-10 (1st team)
- Jim Thorpe Award
- Chuck Bednarik Award semifinalist
- Ronnie Lott Award semifinalist

P Keenyn Crier

- All-Pacific-10 (1st team)

DT Lionel Dotson

- All-Pacific-10 (2nd team)

OT Peter Graniello

- All-Pacific-10 (Honorable Mention)

TE Rob Gronkowski

- All-Pacific-10 (Honorable Mention)

LB Spencer Larsen

- All-Pacific-10 (1st team)

WR Mike Thomas

- All-Pacific-10 (1st team)

QB Willie Tuitama

- All-Pacific-10 (Honorable Mention)

WR Anthony Johnson

- All-Pacific-10 (Honorable Mention)
