= Jake Locker =

American football player (born 1988)

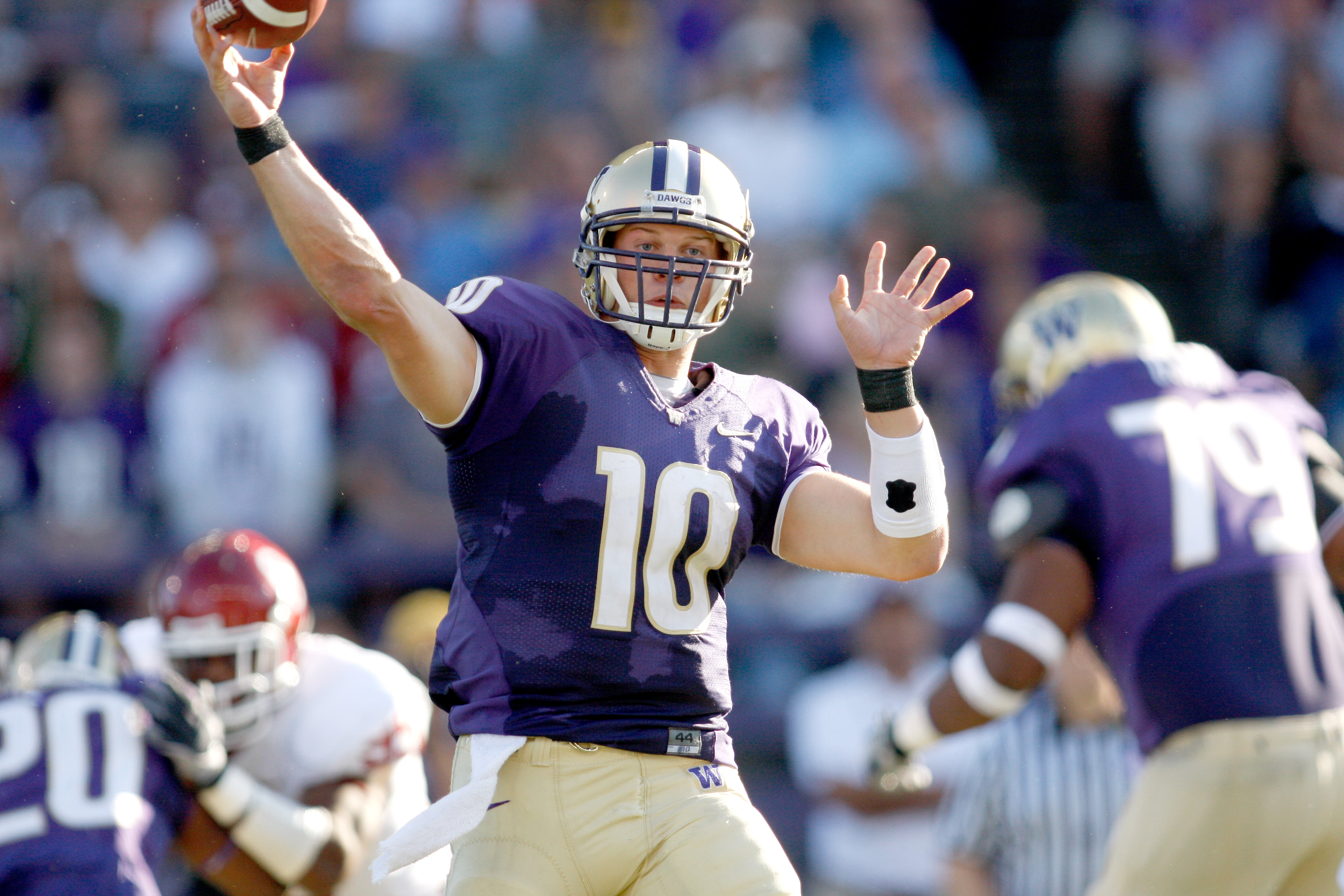
- Locker with the Washington Huskies in 2008

No. 10
- Position: Quarterback

Personal information
- Born: June 15, 1988 (age 38); Bellingham, Washington, U.S.
- Listed height: 6 ft 3 in (1.91 m)
- Listed weight: 223 lb (101 kg)

Career information
- High school: Ferndale (Ferndale, Washington)
- College: Washington (2006–2010)
- NFL draft: 2011: 1st round, 8th overall pick

Career history
- Tennessee Titans (2011–2014)

Awards and highlights
- Freshman All-American (2007); Pac-10 Freshman of the Year (2007)

Career NFL statistics
- Passing attempts: 709
- Passing completions: 408
- Completion percentage: 57.5%
- TD–INT: 27–22
- Passing yards: 4,967
- Passer rating: 79.0
- Rushing yards: 644
- Rushing touchdowns: 5
- Stats at Pro Football Reference

Jacob Cooper Locker (born June 15, 1988) is an American former professional football player who was a quarterback for the Tennessee Titans of the National Football League (NFL). He played college football for the Washington Huskies and was selected by the Titans with the eighth overall pick in the 2011 NFL draft.

A backup during his entire rookie season, after becoming the Titans' starting quarterback for the 2012 season, Locker compiled a 9–14 career record with the Titans over the next three seasons. He abruptly retired after the 2014 season, with the end of his rookie contract, following an injury-plagued, four-year professional career.

== Early life ==
Having grown up in Ferndale, Washington, Locker led the 2005 Ferndale High School to a 14–0 record and a state title, throwing for 1,603 yards and 25 touchdown passes for the season with only 3 interceptions. Locker was an excellent running quarterback, also rushing for 1,339 yards and 24 touchdowns during his senior year. Locker earned first-team All-America honors from Parade. He was also named the 3A state player of the year by the Associated Press and Seattle Times, also earning first-team All-state honors from both media companies. In the 2005 Washington 3A state title game, Locker had four touchdowns and 272 total yards in a 47–12 win over Prosser High School.

He helped Ferndale to a No. 12 ranking in USA Today's final West Region rankings, and a No. 12 ranking in MaxPreps's final national rankings. Personally, he was a highly ranked college recruit. He was one of four Seattle Times "Blue Chip" recruits and ranked No. 5 nationally at QB, and No. 1 in the West, by PrepStar. Locker also ranked 85th in Scout.com's National "Hot 100" and ranked 68th overall and fourth among "dual-threat" quarterbacks in Rivals.com's national rankings.

He was also a successful quarterback as an underclassman. As a junior, he threw for 1,314 yards and 16 TDs and rushed for 987 yards and 15 TDs. Locker led Ferndale to a 13–2 record and a Washington 3A state runner-up finish in 2004. He was selected first-team all-state by the AP. As a sophomore, he threw for 713 yards with nine TDs, while running for 478 yards and three scores. In addition to quarterback, Locker played four years as a defensive back at Ferndale and was the first freshman ever to start in coach Vic Randall's 21-year career.

Locker was also a standout baseball pitcher and outfielder. He was drafted by the Los Angeles Angels of Anaheim in the 40th round (1,212th overall) of the 2006 Major League Baseball draft. He did not sign so that he could play college football the University of Washington.

== College career ==
On July 31, 2005, Locker committed to the Washington Huskies football team. Husky fans quickly dubbed him "Montlake Jake" and expecting him to be the savior of the recently struggling program.

=== 2006 season ===
In 2006, Locker won UW's Pepsi Player of the Week Award for his work on the service team after the Fresno State, Arizona, and Washington State games. He made the travel squad for every game, and suited up for all twelve games, but didn't see any game action. During this time, Locker quarterbacked the UW service team and redshirted.

=== 2007 season ===
Locker was handed the starting quarterback position prior to the start of spring drills and emerged from pre-season drills as the team's starter. He was named the Rivals.com Freshman of the Week following his two rushing TD performance in the opener at Syracuse. He carried the ball 10 times for 83 yards and went 14-for-19 passing for 142 yards. Locker was named the SIonCampus.com Player of the Week after leading the Huskies to a 24–10 win over #20 Boise State, snapping the Broncos' 14-game winning streak. During a loss to Arizona, he became the 19th player in college football history to pass for 300 yards and run for 100.

On November 10, Locker was injured during a game at Oregon State, removed from the field by ambulance, and taken to Good Samaritan Hospital in Corvallis. He returned to the stadium in the fourth quarter to watch the end of the game, though he was wearing a neck brace.

Locker was named to the Rivals.com 2007 Freshman Second-team All-American team and was named Pac-10 Freshman of the Year. In 2007, he set UW records for rushing yards in a season by a freshman (986), rushing yards in a season by a quarterback (his 986 yards was also a Pac-10 record), rushing attempts by a quarterback (172), passing yards by a freshman (2,062), touchdown passes by a freshman (14), and longest pass completion (98 yards to Marcel Reece vs. Arizona).

=== 2008 season ===
During summer of 2008, Locker played outfield for the Bellingham Bells of the West Coast Collegiate Baseball League, where he was named by Baseball America as the league's top prospect. On the fourth day of summer football practice in 2008, Locker partially tore his hamstring; he resumed full practices on August 18.

In the second game of the season against Brigham Young University, with the Huskies trailing 28–21, Locker rushed for a touchdown with two seconds remaining to bring the score to 28–27. After tumbling into the end zone, Locker threw the ball up into the air and was assessed a 15-yard unsportsmanlike conduct penalty. This backed the point after touchdown kick, which was to tie the game and in all likelihood send it to overtime, from the 3-yard line to the 18-yard line. The kick was blocked and UW lost by a point. The call was seen as controversial, in that it followed the letter of the rule dictating that players who score a touchdown must hand the ball over to officials in an orderly fashion but some believe violated its spirit, because Locker's act of throwing the ball was simply an emotional reaction to a big play and not an attempt to taunt his opponents or delay the game. Locker later apologized for incurring the penalty. Against Stanford on September 27, Locker suffered a broken thumb and was sidelined for the remainder of the season, which ended at 0–12, the worst record in program history.

=== Drafted again by Major League Baseball ===
Locker was drafted as a center fielder at the end of the tenth round (321st overall) of the 2009 Major League Baseball draft by the Anaheim Angels, the same team that drafted him three years earlier. The Angels offered him a contract, but Locker declined.

=== 2009 season ===
On September 19, 2009, Locker led unranked Washington to a 16–13 victory over third-ranked USC. Tied at 13–13 late in the fourth quarter, Locker led a 68-yard drive that ended with a 22-yard game-winning field goal with three seconds remaining. The win moved the Huskies up to 24th in the AP poll, the first time Washington was ranked since 2003. Locker and the Huskies had an up and down season, finishing with a 5–7 record highlighted by a 42–10 blowout win of No. 19 California in the finale. On December 14, Washington announced Locker's decision to remain and play his senior year at Washington in 2010, rather than turn declare for the NFL draft. For his performance in 2009, Jake Locker was named Male Sports Star of the Year in the 75th annual Seattle Sports Star of the Year awards.

=== 2010 season ===
In 2010, Locker was a finalist for The Premier Player of College Football Trophy, awarded based on the votes of fans.

Locker finished his college career in the Holiday Bowl with a 19–7 win over heavily favored Nebraska, despite completing only five of sixteen passes in the game. This atoned for a 56–21 loss to the Cornhuskers in Seattle earlier in the season, a game in which Locker was criticized for his 4–20 performance with two interceptions.

This win lifted Locker's record to 16–24 (.400) as a starter for the Huskies. Twenty-eight quarterbacks were selected in the first round of the NFL draft from 2000 to 2010, but only five others had losing records as college starters: Patrick Ramsey, Kyle Boller, J. P. Losman, Jay Cutler, Josh Freeman. Locker graduated in December 2010 with a degree in history.

== Professional career ==
=== Pre-draft ===
With one year of eligibility remaining at Washington, Locker was considered to be a top prospect in the 2010 NFL draft by many internet mock drafts, with some analysts ranking him in the top three available quarterbacks. On December 14, 2009, ESPN's College Football Live reported that Locker would return for his senior season. In doing so, Locker passed up on tens of millions of dollars, as the new CBA between the NFL and the NFLPA would be going into effect before the 2011 season, significantly limiting pay for draftees.

Adam Schefter posted on his Twitter page that an anonymous NFL GM, in speaking with ESPN NFL analyst Chris Mortensen, told Mortensen that Locker is "a bigger, taller, right-handed version of Steve Young."

Prior to Locker's announcement declaring his intention to stay for his senior season, ESPN draft analyst Todd McShay had projected Locker as the No. 1 overall pick in the 2010 draft. But there was also some disagreement in certain circles with McShay's assessment—it had been reported that Locker was advised by the NFL Collegiate Advisory Committee that he would not have received a "1st round grade."

ESPN analyst Mel Kiper, Jr. predicted before and after the 2010 draft that Locker would be the No. 1 overall pick in 2011.

ESPN analyst John Clayton stated in October of Locker's disappointing senior campaign that the quarterback might fall to the 2nd or 3rd round in the 2011 draft due to his inaccuracy and poor play.

Pre-draft measurables
Height	Weight	Arm length	Hand span	Wingspan	40-yard dash	10-yard split	20-yard split	20-yard shuttle	Three-cone drill	Vertical jump	Broad jump	Wonderlic
6 ft 2 1/2 in (1.89 m)	231 lb (105 kg)	31 5/8 in (0.80 m)	9 5/8 in (0.24 m)	6 ft 3 7/8 in (1.93 m)	4.58 s	1.66 s	2.69 s	4.12 s	6.77 s	35.0 in (0.89 m)	10 ft 0 in (3.05 m)	20
All values from 2011 NFL Scouting Combine

=== 2011 season: Backup season ===
Locker was selected with the 8th overall pick in the 2011 NFL draft by the Tennessee Titans. On July 29, he signed a 4-year contract worth a reported $12 million.

Locker saw his first real playing time on November 20, against the Atlanta Falcons, replacing an injured Matt Hasselbeck. In a losing effort, Locker threw for 2 touchdowns and 140 yards.

Locker completed his rookie season with 4 passing touchdowns as well as 1 rushing touchdown. He acted as backup and occasional relief to Hasselbeck, playing in five games.

=== 2012 season: Move to starter ===
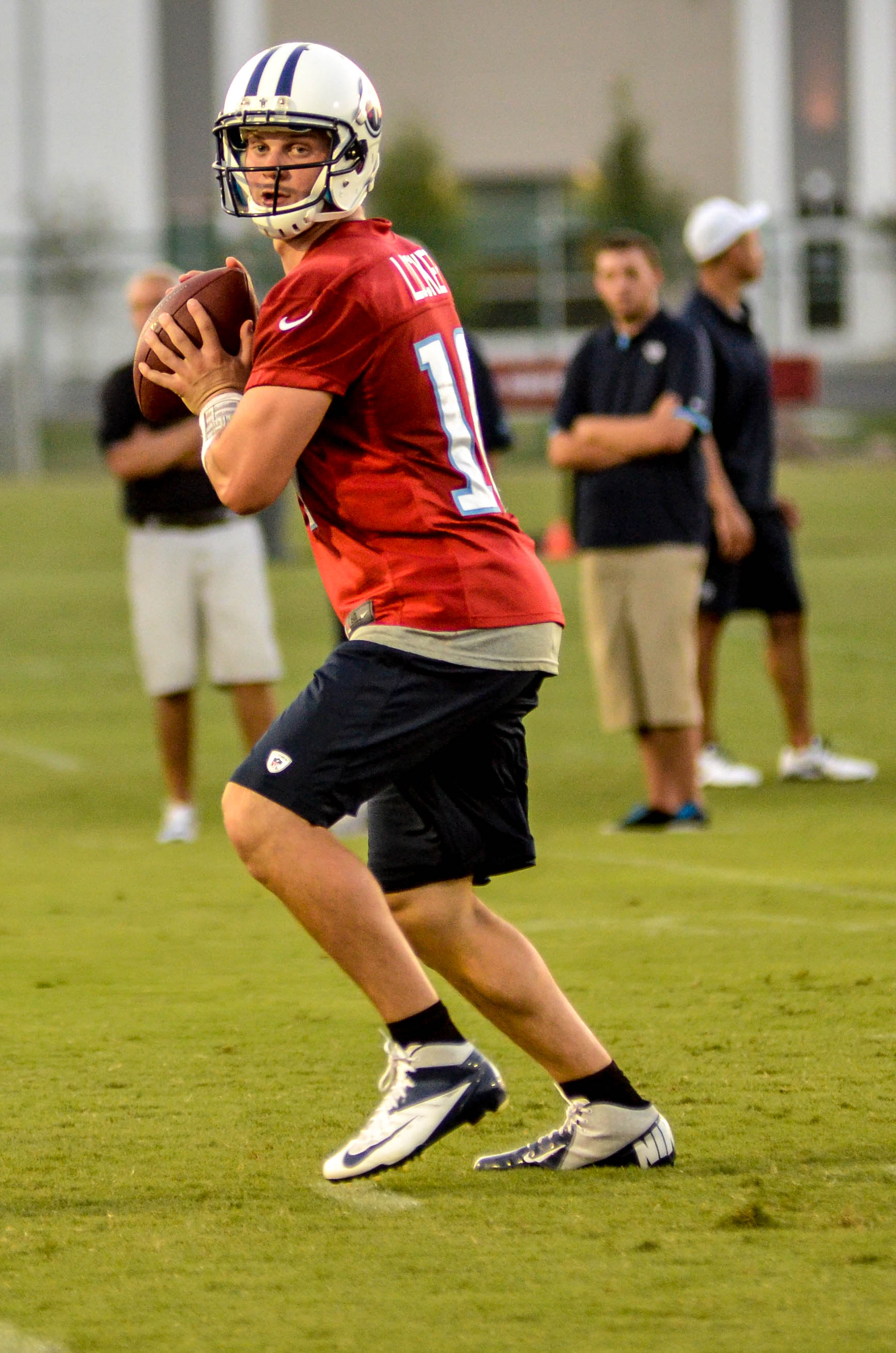
Locker during training camp on July 29, 2012

After competing with Hasselbeck during the 2012 preseason, Locker was named the starter for the regular season on August 20, 2012. His first start came on September 9 against the Patriots and was a rough affair, as he completed 229 yards passing and one touchdown with one interception. His first win came on September 23 against the Lions, when he threw for 373 yards and two scores in a 44–41 overtime Titans win. On September 30, Locker tore his non-throwing shoulder and was replaced by Hasselbeck. Locker was later confirmed by Titans head coach Mike Munchak as the starter on November 9 against the Miami Dolphins. The Titans finished with a 6–10 record.

Locker finished 2012 with 2,176 yards passing, ten touchdown passes, and 11 interceptions. He rushed 41 times for 291 yards and a touchdown, playing in 11 games.

=== 2013 season ===
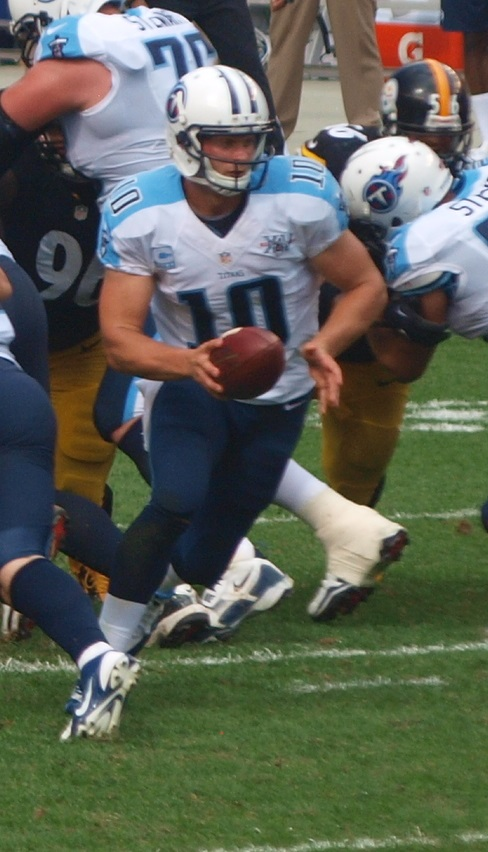
Locker vs. Pittsburgh Steelers in 2013

The Titans started their season week 1 against the Pittsburgh Steelers. He went 11/20 passing for 125 yards and had 0 touchdowns and 0 interceptions in the 16–9 win.

The following week against the Houston Texans, Locker completed 17/30 of his passes for 148 yards with 2 touchdowns and 0 interceptions, but the Titans ultimately fell short in the game losing 30–24 in overtime.

On September 22, 2013, Locker became the first Titans quarterback to beat the San Diego Chargers since the club's 1992 season as the Houston Oilers; Locker threw a 34-yard strike to Justin Hunter with fifteen seconds to go, securing a 20–17 Titans win. Locker earlier in that game had rushed in a seven-yard score.

On September 29, 2013, in a 38–13 win over the New York Jets, Locker was hit by two Jets defenders and was carted off the field with what appeared to be a serious right leg injury. Initial news reports, from multiple sources, indicated that the injury was to his right hip. Locker, according to a report by the team posted on USA Today, would miss three weeks. Ryan Fitzpatrick became the Titans' starting quarterback for the next two games.

On October 19, the ESPN website reported Locker would start against the 49ers; he completed 25 passes for 326 yards and two touchdowns with his first interception of the season in a 31–17 loss.

On November 3, Locker played against the Rams. He completed 13/22 of his passes for 185 yards. He had no touchdowns and 2 interceptions. He added on 3 carries for 10 yards and a touchdown rushing. Despite a poor passing performance, the Titans won 28–21.

During a November 10 loss to the Jacksonville Jaguars, Locker sustained a Lisfranc injury to his right foot, ending his season. Fitzpatrick started for the Titans for the rest of the season and the team finished with a 7–9 record.

=== 2014 season ===
On April 30, 2014, the Titans declined the fifth-year option on Locker's contract, which was considered unsurprising due to his history of injuries. Having posted a winning record in the previous season and entering the last year of his contract, the 2014 season was considered a make-or-break season for him. Locker started off the 2014 season under new head coach Ken Whisenhunt. He played in week 1 against the Kansas City Chiefs, and completed 66% of his passes for 266 yards, 2 touchdowns and 0 interceptions, with a passer rating of 111.4. During a week three loss against the Cincinnati Bengals, Locker injured his right wrist and missed the next game against the Indianapolis Colts. He returned to play in the week five game against the Cleveland Browns, but suffered a thumb injury before the second half.

On October 22, 2014, Locker was benched along with Charlie Whitehurst in favor of rookie quarterback Zach Mettenberger. He returned to start the Week 15 game against the New York Jets, and left the game with a shoulder injury. He was subsequently placed on injured reserve, ending his season.

=== Retirement ===
Although there was considerable interest around the NFL in signing him as a free agent, Locker announced his retirement from the NFL on March 10, 2015, saying he no longer had the same extreme focus on playing, and that it would not be fair to a team which signed him.

== Career statistics ==
=== NFL ===
Year	Team	Games			Passing								Rushing				Sacked		Fumbles (Note: Fumbles lost data taken from Pro Football Reference career game log)	
Year	Team	GP	GS	Record	Cmp	Att	Pct	Yds	Y/A	TD	Int	Rtg	Att	Yds	Avg	TD	Sck	Yds	Fum	Lost
2011	TEN	5	0	–	34	66	51.5	542	8.2	4	0	99.4	8	56	7.0	1	5	37	0	0
2012	TEN	11	11	4–7	177	314	56.4	2,176	6.9	10	11	74.0	41	291	7.1	1	25	151	4	4
2013	TEN	7	7	4–3	111	183	60.7	1,256	6.9	8	4	86.7	24	155	6.5	2	16	105	3	1
2014	TEN	7	5	1–4	86	146	58.9	993	6.8	5	7	70.9	22	142	6.5	1	14	85	3	1
Total		30	23	9–14	408	709	57.5	4,967	7.0	27	22	79.0	95	644	6.8	5	60	378	10	7

=== College ===
Season	Team	GP	Passing							Rushing			
Season	Team	GP	Cmp	Att	Pct	Yds	TD	Int	Rtg	Att	Yds	Avg	TD
2006	Washington	Redshirted											
2007	Washington	12	155	328	47.3	2,062	14	15	105.0	172	986	5.7	13
2008	Washington	4	50	93	53.8	512	1	0	103.6	56	180	3.2	3
2009	Washington	12	230	395	58.4	2,800	21	11	129.7	112	388	3.5	7
2010	Washington	12	184	332	55.4	2,265	17	9	124.2	114	385	3.4	6
Totals		40	619	1,148	53.9	7,639	53	35	119.0	454	1,939	4.3	29

== Personal life ==
On December 18, 2010, Locker became engaged to Lauren Greer, a former University of Washington softball player. The two married and have a daughter and three sons. He is the co-owner of a fitness center in Ferndale with former NFL punter Michael Koenen, and in 2018 began taking courses in theology.

== See also ==
- List of Tennessee Titans first-round draft picks
- Washington Huskies football statistical leaders
