= 2007 Oregon State Beavers football team =

American college football season

2007 Oregon State Beavers football

Emerald Bowl champion

Emerald Bowl, W 21–14 vs. Maryland
- Conference: Pacific-10 Conference

Ranking
- AP: No. 25
- Record: 9–4 (6–3 Pac-10)
- Head coach: Mike Riley (7th season)
- Offensive coordinator: Danny Langsdorf (3rd season)
- Offensive scheme: Multiple
- Defensive coordinator: Mark Banker (5th season)
- Base defense: 4–3
- Home stadium: Reser Stadium

2007 Pacific-10 Conference football standings
	Conf.			Overall
Team	W		L	W		L
No. 3 USC +	7	–	2	11	–	2
No. 16 Arizona State +	7	–	2	10	–	3
No. 25 Oregon State	6	–	3	9	–	4
No. 23 Oregon	5	–	4	9	–	4
UCLA	5	–	4	6	–	7
Arizona	4	–	5	5	–	7
California	3	–	6	7	–	6
Washington State	3	–	6	5	–	7
Stanford	3	–	6	4	–	8
Washington	2	–	7	4	–	9
+ – Conference co-champions; Rankings from AP Poll

The 2007 Oregon State Beavers football team represented Oregon State University in the 2007 NCAA Division I FBS football season. The team's head coach was Mike Riley. Home games were played at Reser Stadium in Corvallis, Oregon.

The team returned 16 starting players from the previous season and was predicted by some analysts to contend for second place in the Pac-10. They returned a majority of the defense, which was ranked second in the nation for total sacks, eighth in the nation in tackles for loss, and within the top 20 in rushing defense in the 2006–07 season. CFN picked the Beavers in their preseason top 25 and claimed they were a "heavy sleeper for big things" in the 2007 season. The Beavers finished the season 9–4, good for third place in the Pac-10, and won the Emerald Bowl 21–14. Their run defense finished second in the nation for fewest rushing yards allowed per game only behind Boston College.

== Schedule ==
Date	Time	Opponent	Site	TV	Result	Attendance	Source
August 30	7:00 pm	Utah*	Reser Stadium; Corvallis, OR	FSN	W 24–7	40,409	
September 6	4:30 pm	at Cincinnati*	Nippert Stadium; Cincinnati, OH	ESPN	L 3–34	25,020	
September 15	3:30 pm	Idaho State*	Reser Stadium; Corvallis, OR	FSNNW	W 61–10	38,491	
September 22	7:00 pm	at Arizona State	Sun Devil Stadium; Tempe, AZ		L 32–44	56,099	
September 29	3:30 pm	UCLA	Reser Stadium; Corvallis, OR	FSN	L 14–40	41,137	
October 6	1:00 pm	Arizona	Reser Stadium; Corvallis, OR		W 31–16	40,489	
October 13	4:00 pm	at No. 2 California	California Memorial Stadium; Berkeley, CA	Versus	W 31–28	63,995	
October 27	3:30 pm	Stanford^{†}	Reser Stadium; Corvallis, OR (Hispanic Heritage Game)		W 23–6	42,089	
November 3	5:00 pm	at No. 13 USC	Los Angeles Memorial Coliseum; Los Angeles, CA	ABC	L 3–24	85,713	
November 10	7:15 pm	Washington	Reser Stadium; Corvallis, OR	FSN	W 29–23	45,629	
November 17	3:30 pm	at Washington State	Martin Stadium; Pullman, WA	FSNNW	W 52–17	22,660	
December 1	1:30 pm	at No. 18 Oregon	Autzen Stadium; Eugene, OR (Civil War)	ESPN2	W 38–31 ^{2OT}	59,050	
December 28	5:30 pm	vs. Maryland*	AT&T Park; San Francisco, CA (Emerald Bowl)	ESPN	W 21–14	32,517	
*Non-conference game; ^{†}Homecoming; Rankings from AP Poll released prior to the game; All times are in Pacific time

== Game summaries ==
=== Utah ===
Team	1	2	3	4	Total
Utah	0	7	0	0	7
• Oregon St	0	7	10	7	24

- Date: August 30
- Location: Reser Stadium, Corvallis, Oregon

The Beavers opened the season hosting the Utah Utes of the Mountain West Conference on a Thursday night game, the first day of the college football season. Beavers' star running back Yvenson Bernard ran for 165 yards and two touchdowns and quarterback Sean Canfield completed eight of 19 passes for 87 yards and a touchdown. Beaver Coach Mike Riley, still trying to determine a starting quarterback, also brought in quarterback Lyle Moevao to start the second quarter, though his first pass was intercepted. Alexis Serna made a 37-yard field goal in the 3rd quarter.

=== Cincinnati ===
Team	1	2	3	4	Total
Oregon St	0	3	0	0	3
• Cincinnati	3	7	24	0	34

- Date: September 6
- Location: Nippert Stadium, Cincinnati

=== Idaho State ===
Team	1	2	3	4	Total
Idaho St	0	3	0	7	10
• Oregon St	21	7	19	14	61

- Date: September 15
- Location: Reser Stadium, Corvallis, Oregon

=== Arizona State ===
Team	1	2	3	4	Total
Oregon St	19	0	7	6	32
• Arizona St	0	13	14	17	44

- Date: September 22
- Location: Sun Devil Stadium, Tempe, Arizona

=== UCLA ===
Team	1	2	3	4	Total
• UCLA	0	6	6	28	40
Oregon St	14	0	0	0	14

- Date: September 29
- Location: Reser Stadium, Corvallis, Oregon

=== Arizona ===
Team	1	2	3	4	Total
Arizona	3	7	3	3	16
• Oregon St	24	7	0	0	31

- Date: October 6
- Location: Reser Stadium, Corvallis, Oregon

=== California ===
Team	1	2	3	4	Total
• Oregon St	7	6	7	11	31
California	0	14	0	14	28

- Date: October 13
- Location: California Memorial Stadium, Berkeley, California

=== Stanford ===
Team	1	2	3	4	Total
Stanford	0	6	0	0	6
• Oregon St	7	7	3	6	23

- Date: October 27
- Location: Reser Stadium, Corvallis, Oregon

=== Southern California ===
Team	1	2	3	4	Total
Oregon St	0	3	0	0	3
• USC	3	21	0	0	24

- Date: November 3
- Location: Los Angeles Memorial Coliseum, Los Angeles

=== Washington ===
Team	1	2	3	4	Total
Washington	0	0	10	13	23
• Oregon St	0	16	3	10	29

- Date: November 10
- Location: Reser Stadium, Corvallis, Oregon

=== Washington State ===
Team	1	2	3	4	Total
• Oregon St	21	10	7	14	52
Washington St	0	3	7	7	17

- Date: November 17
- Location: Martin Stadium, Pullman, Washington

On a cold, rainy night in Pullman, Washington, the Beavers forced 8 turnovers en route to a 52-17 victory against the Cougars. Yvenson Bernard ran for 2 touchdowns and 77 yards as Lyle Moevao played mistake free in his second career start. Alex Brink threw 5 first half interceptions as the stingy Beaver defense put pressure on him all game long.

=== Oregon ===
Beavers own the State again. James Rodgers scores on a fly sweep in double OT. OSU's stingy D stuffs Jonathan Stewart on 4th down, to clinch the first victory on enemy soil for either team since 1996.

Oregon State at #17 Oregon

Team	1	2	3	4	OT	2OT	Total
• Oregon State	14	7	0	7	3	7	38
Oregon	7	14	7	0	3	0	31

- Date: December 1
- Location: Autzen Stadium, Eugene, Oregon
- Game start: 4:30 p.m. EST

Scoring summary
1	14:36	OSU	Matthew Sieverson 38-yard run (Alexis Serna kick)	OSU 7-0
1	4:02	ORE	Jeff Maehl 31-yard pass from Justin Roper (Matt Evensen kick)	Tied 7-7
1	0:50	OSU	Clinton Polk 1-yard run (Alexis Serna kick)	OSU 14-7
2	14:49	OSU	Derrick Doggett 28-yard interception return (Alexis Serna kick)	OSU 21-7
2	1:13	ORE	Garrett Strong 3-yard pass from Justin Roper (Matt Evensen kick)	OSU 21-14
2	0:54	ORE	Jairus Byrd 33-yard fumble return (Matt Evensen kick)	Tied 21-21
3	7:10	ORE	Justin Roper 7-yard run (Matt Evensen kick)	ORE 28-21
4	14:43	OSU	Lyle Moevao 1-yard run (Alexis Serna kick)	Tied 28-28
OT		ORE	Matt Evensen 25-yard field goal	ORE 31-28
OT		OSU	Alexis Serna 41-yard field goal	Tied 31-31
2OT		OSU	James Rodgers 25-yard run (Alexis Serna kick)	OSU 38-31

=== Emerald Bowl ===
Team	1	2	3	4	Total
Maryland	14	0	0	0	14
• Oregon St	7	7	7	0	21

- Date: December 28
- Location: AT&T Park, San Francisco, California

== Roster ==
QB#1 Sean Canfield (SO) QB#3 Lyle Moevao (SO) QB#2 Ryan Gunderson (SR) RB#6 Clinton Polk (SR) RB#5 Patrick Fuller (JR) WR#9 Anthony Brown (SR) WR#16 James Rodgers (FR) DL#78 Brennan Olander WR#12 Chris Johnson (JR) WR#15 Sam Oltman (FR) WR#17 Sammie Stroughter (SR) TE#19 Brady Camp (FR) LS#55 Joel Cohen (SR) K#13 Alexis Serna (SR) TE#85 John Reese (SO)
