= Tavita Pritchard =

American football coach (born 1987)

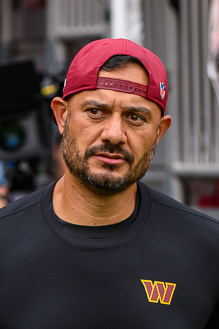
- Pritchard with the Washington Commanders in 2025

Current position
- Title: Head coach
- Team: Stanford
- Conference: ACC
- Record: 6–5

Biographical details
- Born: February 20, 1987 (age 39); Tacoma, Washington, U.S.

Playing career
- 2006–2009: Stanford
- Position: Quarterback

Coaching career (HC unless noted)
- 2011–2012: Stanford (DA)
- 2013: Stanford (RB)
- 2014–2017: Stanford (QB/WR)
- 2018–2022: Stanford (OC/QB)
- 2023–2025: Washington Commanders (QB)
- 2026–present: Stanford

Head coaching record
- Overall: 6–5

Tavita Pritchard (ta-VEE-tuh; born February 20, 1987) is an American football coach and former quarterback who is the head coach for the Stanford Cardinal. Pritchard played college football at Stanford, and was a member of the team that upset USC in the 2007 victory over the Trojans - widely considered one of the biggest upsets in college football history. He entered coaching as a graduate assistant with Stanford in 2010; he was named offensive coordinator in 2018. Pritchard served as the Washington Commanders' quarterback coach from 2023 to 2025 before being named Stanford's head coach for the 2026 season.

== Playing career ==
Pritchard graduated from Clover Park High School in Lakewood, Washington, where as quarterback of the football team, he threw for 5,323 yards and 55 touchdowns in his high school career.

At Stanford, he received his first start in 2007 against the top-ranked USC Trojans, after starter T. C. Ostrander suffered a seizure the week before. Though Stanford was a 41-point underdog, he led them to a 24–23 victory. The game is considered among the greatest upsets in college football history.

Pritchard was replaced as the starting quarterback by redshirt freshman Andrew Luck during the 2009 season. After Luck injured a finger on his throwing hand and had surgery prior to the 2009 Sun Bowl, Pritchard started the game for the Cardinal. He went 8 for 19 for 118 yards and two interceptions in the 31–27 loss to Oklahoma. Pritchard went undrafted in the 2010 NFL draft. He tried out with the San Francisco 49ers but was not offered a contract.

== Coaching career ==
=== Stanford (2010–2022) ===
Pritchard worked as a volunteer assistant for the Stanford football team in 2010, and in 2011, was hired as a defensive assistant football coach at Stanford by new head football coach David Shaw. In January 2013, Pritchard was elevated to the role of running backs coach. In December 2013, he was promoted to quarterbacks and wide receivers coach, succeeding Mike Sanford. In December 2017, Pritchard was promoted to offensive coordinator when Mike Bloomgren left to become head coach at Rice.

=== Washington Commanders (2023–2025) ===
On February 24, 2023, Pritchard was hired by the Washington Commanders as their quarterbacks coach under head coach Ron Rivera. In 2024 he would coach quarterback Jayden Daniels, who would go on to win Offensive Rookie of the Year.

=== Stanford Cardinal (2026–present) ===
Pritchard was named Stanford's head football coach on November 28, 2025.

== Personal life ==
Pritchard's father David was a starting center at Washington State in 1981 and an uncle is former NFL quarterback Jack "The Throwin' Samoan" Thompson. His paternal grandparents had moved to the continental US state of Washington from Leone, American Samoa. He is third in a family of eleven children. He grew up in Centralia, Washington and for his freshman year of high school he moved to Lakewood, Washington.

== Head coaching record ==
Year	Team	Overall	Conference	Standing	Bowl/playoffs
Stanford Cardinal (Atlantic Coast Conference) (2026–present)
2026	Stanford	6–5	4–4		
Stanford:		6–5	4–4		
Total:		6–5			
