= T. C. Ostrander =

American football player (born 1985)

Profile
- Position: Quarterback

Personal information
- Born: January 4, 1985 (age 41); Stanford, California, U.S.
- Listed height: 6 ft 3 in (1.91 m)
- Listed weight: 215 lb (98 kg)

Career information
- College: Stanford
- NFL draft: 2008: undrafted

Career history
- New Orleans Saints (2008)*
- * Offseason or practice squad member only

Thomas Clinton Ostrander (born January 4, 1985) is an American former college football player who was a quarterback for the Stanford Cardinal.

== Early life ==
Ostrander graduated from Menlo-Atherton High School in Atherton, California, where he led the team to a Central Coast Section Division II championship in his senior year. That year, he completed 193 of 288 passes for 3,059 yards, 44 touchdowns, and just seven interceptions.

== College career ==
Ostrander was a top quarterback recruit in 2002. He chose Stanford University, and after redshirting in his freshman year of 2003, Ostrander started the last two games of the 2004 season after starter Trent Edwards went out with injuries. He played backup to Edwards in 2005 and the first half of 2006. When Edwards suffered a season-ending foot injury in the seventh week of the 2006 season, Ostrander became the starter, and started for the first 4 games of the 2007 season under new coach Jim Harbaugh.

On September 30, 2007, Ostrander suffered a seizure while watching Edwards make his first professional start for the Buffalo Bills. He was sidelined as a precautionary measure for Stanford's next game against top-ranked USC. His backup, Tavita Pritchard, led Stanford to an upset 24–23 victory and was named the starter for the next game against TCU. Pritchard remained the starter until the last game of the season against Cal, when Ostrander again got the start in his last college game. He and Pritchard both played, with each throwing a touchdown pass to lead Stanford to its first Big Game win since 2001.

== Professional career ==
Ostrander went undrafted in the 2008 NFL draft, but was signed as a free agent by the New Orleans Saints soon afterward. On May 18, 2008, Ostrander was waived.
