= Derek Belch =

American chief executive

Derek Belch (born 1985) is the founder and CEO of virtual reality company Strivr, which helps corporations to create and administer courses for employee training. He was the graduate assistant football coach at Stanford University until 2014 when he left to launch his company. Belch has a BA in communication, an MA in journalism, and an MA in Media Studies, all from Stanford. He also has an MBA from University of Southern California. In 2017, Sports Business Journal included him in their "Forty Under 40" list. While at Stanford he was a kicker for the Stanford Cardinal football team.
