= Mike Bellotti =

American college football analyst (born 1950)

Biographical details
- Born: December 21, 1950 (age 75); Sacramento, California, U.S.

Playing career
- 1970–1972: UC Davis
- Positions: Tight end, wide receiver

Coaching career (HC unless noted)
- 1973–1976: UC Davis (assistant)
- 1977–1978: Cal State Hayward (OC)
- 1979: Weber State (OC)
- 1980–1983: Cal State Hayward (OC)
- 1984–1988: Chico State
- 1989–1994: Oregon (OC)
- 1995–2008: Oregon

Administrative career (AD unless noted)
- 2009–2010: Oregon

Head coaching record
- Overall: 137–80–2
- Bowls: 6–6

Accomplishments and honors

Championships
- 2 Pac-10 (2000–2001)
- College Football Hall of Fame; Inducted in 2014 (profile)

Robert Michael Bellotti (born December 21, 1950) is an American college football analyst for ESPN and ABC. He was with the University of Oregon's football program for over 20 years serving as offensive coordinator for six years, head coach for 14 years, and athletic director for one year. Bellotti is the winningest coach in Oregon football history and is credited with building the program into a major football power. He was elected to the College Football Hall of Fame in 2014.

== Early life ==
Bellotti attended Ygnacio Valley High School in Concord, California, where he played football, basketball and baseball and graduated in 1969. After high school, he went to the University of California, Davis and played football at the positions of tight end and wide receiver. He started at tight end as a sophomore and junior, then earned second-team all-Far Western Conference honors at wide receiver as senior. Bellotti graduated from UC Davis with a B.A. in Physical Education in 1973. He completed the teaching credential program at UC Davis in 1974. In 1982, Bellotti earned his Master of Science degree in Physical Education at California State University, East Bay (then known as Cal State-Hayward). He is an alumnus of the Delta Sigma Phi fraternity.

== Coaching career ==
=== UC Davis ===
In 1973, Bellotti started his career in football coaching at his alma mater as an assistant coach under College Football Hall of Fame coach Jim Sochor. The next season, he worked as the JV team's offensive coordinator, and during the 1975 and 1976 seasons he was the JV team's head coach. Also at that time, he served as the receivers coach for the varsity team and as a coach for UC Davis' JV baseball team.

=== Cal State Hayward ===
Bellotti was hired at California State University, Hayward (Cal State Hayward or CSU-Hayward; now California State University, East Bay) in 1977 and worked as the offensive coordinator for two seasons. He returned to the school as offensive coordinator in 1980, and remained until 1983. In 1982, he earned a master's degree from the school in physical education.

=== Weber State ===
In 1979, Bellotti served as offensive coordinator at Weber State University, returning to CSU-Hayward after just one season.

=== Chico State ===
California State University, Chico (Chico State) hired Bellotti to serve as their head football coach in 1984. He remained head coach until 1988 and compiled a record of 21–25–2. His record in the Northern California Athletic Conference was 15–9–2.

=== Oregon ===
University of Oregon head coach Rich Brooks hired Bellotti as offensive coordinator in 1989. Bellotti remained in that position through the 1994 season, when Brooks left to coach in the National Football League, and Bellotti was promoted to head coach starting with the 1995 season.

Bellotti's record at Oregon stands at 116–55. In 2006, he passed his former boss, Rich Brooks, as the winningest football coach in Oregon's history. He led the Ducks to their first four ten-win seasons in school history (2000, 2001, 2005, 2008); they had only won nine games on three occasions in the 100 years before Bellotti took over. He led the Ducks to 12 bowl games, three more than they had attended in their entire history before his arrival. His best season was 2001, when he led the Ducks to an 11–1 record and a victory in the Fiesta Bowl. They finished second in both major polls, the highest final ranking in school history. The 11 wins would remain a school record until the 2010 team's 12-win season.

Bellotti also led Oregon to a regular season #2 ranking in the 2007 season, albeit very briefly. After achieving that ranking, the Ducks lost Heisman Trophy candidate quarterback Dennis Dixon to a season-ending knee injury, and Oregon proceeded to lose three straight games to Arizona, UCLA, and arch-rival Oregon State to close out the regular season. Earlier that season, Bellotti had led Oregon to a resounding 39–7 victory over Michigan at "The Big House", earning the Ducks and Dixon much national attention. Oregon also defeated #9 USC and #6 Arizona State in back-to-back games at Autzen Stadium earlier that season. Oregon recovered from their three-game losing streak following the Dixon injury by defeating South Florida in the Sun Bowl in dominating fashion (56–21), thus ending a streak of four straight bowl losses for the Ducks. In 2008, the Ducks recovered strongly from a mid-season lull to win their last four games against solid competition, including a Holiday Bowl win over 13th-ranked Oklahoma State. Although he only won two Pac-10 titles due to the latter half of his tenure being occupied by USC's dominance of the conference, Bellotti is still credited with building Oregon into a major football power nonetheless.

== Oregon athletic director ==
On December 2, 2008, shortly after defeating the Oregon State Beavers in the Civil War to prevent them from clinching a Rose Bowl berth, the university announced that Bellotti would pass the head coaching position on to offensive coordinator Chip Kelly at some undetermined point in the future and take over as the university's athletic director at that time.

During his tenure as athletic director, Bellotti dealt with a number of disciplinary issues involving members of the football program, including LeGarrette Blount, LaMichael James, and Jeremiah Masoli, and fired long-time basketball coach Ernie Kent, whose teams had performed poorly in recent seasons. After just nine months on the job, Bellotti announced his resignation March 19, 2010 to join ESPN as a college football analyst. Bellotti had agreed to terms with UO officials, but there was no written contract. The resignation agreement, including the payout terms, was placed on paper and signed by Bellotti on March 16, with university president Richard Lariviere signing it on March 19. Because of the lack of an initial written contract, the Oregon Justice Department reviewed the $2.3 million severance payment from the University of Oregon to the former athletic director. In addition to the buyout Bellotti draws a $559,000 yearly pension from the Oregon Public Employees Retirement System.

In 2009, Bellotti was named third vice president of the American Football Coaches Association. According to AFCA tradition, he would move up to second vice president in 2010, first vice president in 2011 and president in 2012.

== ESPN analyst ==
In March 2010, Bellotti announced that he was resigning as athletic director to become a college football television analyst on ESPN, with his first appearance on ESPN to occur in April.

== Head coaching record ==
| Year | Team | Overall | Conference | Standing | Bowl/playoffs | Coaches^{#} | AP^{°} |
|---|---|---|---|---|---|---|---|
Chico State Wildcats (Northern California Athletic Conference) (1984–1988)
| 1984 | Chico State | 4–5–1 | 2–3–1 | 4th | | | |
| 1985 | Chico State | 4–4–1 | 3–1–1 | 2nd | | | |
| 1986 | Chico State | 7–3 | 4–1 | 2nd | | | |
| 1987 | Chico State | 3–6 | 3–2 | 2nd | | | |
| 1988 | Chico State | 3–7 | 3–2 | T–2nd | | | |
| Chico State: | | 21–25–2 | 15–9–2 | | | | |
Oregon Ducks (Pacific-10 Conference) (1995–2008)
| 1995 | Oregon | 9–3 | 6–2 | 3rd | L Cotton | 18 | 18 |
| 1996 | Oregon | 6–5 | 3–5 | T–5th | | | |
| 1997 | Oregon | 7–5 | 3–5 | T–7th | W Las Vegas | | |
| 1998 | Oregon | 8–4 | 5–3 | T–3rd | L Aloha | | |
| 1999 | Oregon | 9–3 | 6–2 | T–2nd | W Sun | 18 | 19 |
| 2000 | Oregon | 10–2 | 7–1 | T–1st | W Holiday | 9 | 7 |
| 2001 | Oregon | 11–1 | 7–1 | 1st | W Fiesta^{†} | 2 | 2 |
| 2002 | Oregon | 7–6 | 3–5 | 8th | L Seattle | | |
| 2003 | Oregon | 8–5 | 5–3 | T–3rd | L Sun | | |
| 2004 | Oregon | 5–6 | 4–4 | T–5th | | | |
| 2005 | Oregon | 10–2 | 7–1 | 2nd | L Holiday | 12 | 12 |
| 2006 | Oregon | 7–6 | 4–5 | T–5th | L Las Vegas | | |
| 2007 | Oregon | 9–4 | 5–4 | T–4th | W Sun | 23 | 24 |
| 2008 | Oregon | 10–3 | 7–2 | T–2nd | W Holiday | 9 | 10 |
| Oregon: | | 116–55 | 72–43 | | | | |
| Total: | | 137–80–2 | | | | | |
National championship Conference title Conference division title or championship game berth
^{†}Indicates BCS bowl.; ^{#}Rankings from final Coaches Poll.; ^{°}Rankings from final AP Poll.
