= 2007 Oregon Ducks football team =

American college football season

2007 Oregon Ducks football

Sun Bowl champion

Sun Bowl, W 56–21 vs. South Florida
- Conference: Pacific-10 Conference

Ranking
- Coaches: No. 24
- AP: No. 23
- Record: 9–4 (5–4 Pac-10)
- Head coach: Mike Bellotti (13th season)
- Offensive coordinator: Chip Kelly (1st season)
- Offensive scheme: Spread
- Defensive coordinator: Nick Aliotti (11th season)
- Base defense: 4–3
- Captains: Patrick Chung; Dennis Dixon; A. J. Tuitele; Max Unger
- Home stadium: Autzen Stadium

Uniform

2007 Pacific-10 Conference football standings
	Conf.			Overall
Team	W		L	W		L
No. 3 USC +	7	–	2	11	–	2
No. 16 Arizona State +	7	–	2	10	–	3
No. 25 Oregon State	6	–	3	9	–	4
No. 23 Oregon	5	–	4	9	–	4
UCLA	5	–	4	6	–	7
Arizona	4	–	5	5	–	7
California	3	–	6	7	–	6
Washington State	3	–	6	5	–	7
Stanford	3	–	6	4	–	8
Washington	2	–	7	4	–	9
+ – Conference co-champions; Rankings from AP Poll

The 2007 Oregon Ducks football team represented the University of Oregon as a member of the Pacific-10 Conference (Pac-10) during the 2007 NCAA Division I FBS football season. Led by 13th-year head coach Mike Bellotti, the Ducks compiled an overall record of 9–4 with a mark of 5–4 in conference play, tying for fourth place in the Pac-10. The team played home games at Autzen Stadium in Eugene, Oregon.

The Ducks rose to a national rank of number 2 in the Bowl Championship Series (BCS) poll, until an injury to starting quarterback Dennis Dixon led to defeat at the hands of the Arizona Wildcats on November 15. They lost the next game to UCLA as backup quarterback Brady Leaf was also injured. Oregon lost the season finale to rival Oregon State on December 1 by a score of 38–31 in two overtimes. Oregon finished the regular season at 8–4 and was invited to the Sun Bowl in El Paso, Texas. On December 31 freshman quarterback Justin Roper, making his first start, passed for four touchdowns, tying a Sun Bowl record, and 180 yards as Oregon crushed the favored South Florida Bulls, 56–21. Jonathan Stewart rushed for a Sun Bowl-record and career-high 253 yards and a touchdown and was named the game's Most Valuable Player. The 56 points scored by the Ducks were also a Sun Bowl record. Oregon was ranked 23rd in the final AP Poll.

== Preseason ==
February 2 – After Gary Crowton, Oregon's Offensive Coordinator for the 2005 and 2006 seasons, resigned to perform the same duties with Louisiana State University, the University of Oregon hired University of New Hampshire Offensive Coordinator Chip Kelly. While at UNH, Kelly's offenses averaged greater than 400 yards a game in seven of his eight years and over 30 points a game for the previous four years.

April 28 – Green defeated White 20–6 in the 2007 spring game.

April 29 – Jordan Kent, Dante Rosario, and Matt Toeaina were selected in the 2007 NFL draft. Dante Rosario was selected by the Carolina Panthers as the 18th pick in the fifth round. Matt Toeaina was selected by the Cincinnati Bengals as the 13th pick in the sixth round. Jordan Kent was selected by the Seattle Seahawks as the 36th pick in the sixth round.

May 9 – Former Oregon running back Ahmad Rashad, also known as Bobby Moore, was selected to the Class of 2007 entering the College Football Hall of Fame.

July 26 – During the Pac-10's media day, the pre-season media poll picks the Ducks to finish 6th in the Pac-10.

=== Recruiting class ===
The 2007 Oregon football recruiting class was selected by Scout.com as the ninth-best recruiting class of 2007 and was selected by Rivals.com as the 11th-best recruiting class of 2007. Oregon signed 27 high school seniors and two junior college transfers.

College recruiting
Name	Hometown	School	Height	Weight	40^{‡}	Commit date
Kenny Rowe; DE	Long Beach, CA	Polytechnic HS	6 ft 3 in (1.91 m)	218 lb (99 kg)	4.7	Jan 21, 2007
Kenny Rowe; DE	Recruit ratings: Scout: Rivals: (79)					
Drew Davis; WR	Denver, CO	Montbello HS	6 ft 2 in (1.88 m)	208 lb (94 kg)	4.5	Dec 14, 2006
Drew Davis; WR	Recruit ratings: Scout: Rivals: (78)					
Malachi Lewis; ATH	Oxnard, CA	Rio Mesa HS	6 ft 4 in (1.93 m)	213 lb (97 kg)	4.5	Jan 28, 2007
Malachi Lewis; ATH	Recruit ratings: Scout: Rivals: (78)					
Myles Wade; DT	Portland, OR	Central Catholic HS	6 ft 2 in (1.88 m)	314 lb (142 kg)	5.0	Jun 30, 2006
Myles Wade; DT	Recruit ratings: Scout: Rivals: (78)					
Darrion Weems; OT	Woodland Hills, CA	William Howard Taft HS	6 ft 6 in (1.98 m)	275 lb (125 kg)	5.1	Jan 21, 2007
Darrion Weems; OT	Recruit ratings: Scout: Rivals: (78)					
Todd Doxey; S	San Diego, CA	Hoover Senior HS	6 ft 2 in (1.88 m)	178 lb (81 kg)	4.6	Dec 6, 2006
Todd Doxey; S	Recruit ratings: Scout: Rivals: (77)					
Terrance Pritchett; LB	Sacramento, CA	Grant Union HS	6 ft 3 in (1.91 m)	205 lb (93 kg)	4.6	Oct 29, 2006
Terrance Pritchett; LB	Recruit ratings: Scout: Rivals: (77)					
Simi Fili; DT	Salt Lake City, UT	Cottonwood HS	6 ft 3 in (1.91 m)	327 lb (148 kg)	5.4	Jan 6, 2007
Simi Fili; DT	Recruit ratings: Scout: Rivals: (75)					
Carson York; OT	Coeur d'Alene, ID	Lake City HS	6 ft 5 in (1.96 m)	276 lb (125 kg)	5.2	May 30, 2006
Carson York; OT	Recruit ratings: Scout: Rivals: (74)					
Terence Scott; WR	Santa Clarita, CA	College of the Canyons	6 ft 0 in (1.83 m)	175 lb (79 kg)	4.4	Jan 21, 2007
Terence Scott; WR	Recruit ratings: Scout: Rivals: (–)					
Charlie Carmichael; OG	Sherman Oaks, CA	Notre Dame HS	6 ft 5 in (1.96 m)	295 lb (134 kg)	5.1	Jun 7, 2006
Charlie Carmichael; OG	Recruit ratings: Scout: Rivals: (76)					
Anthony Gildon; CB	Westlake Village, CA	Oaks Christian School	6 ft 0 in (1.83 m)	183 lb (83 kg)	4.5	Jun 21, 2006
Anthony Gildon; CB	Recruit ratings: Scout: Rivals: (77)					
Will Tukuafu; DE	Mesa, AZ	Mesa CC	6 ft 5 in (1.96 m)	270 lb (120 kg)	4.8	Dec 5, 2006
Will Tukuafu; DE	Recruit ratings: Scout: Rivals: (40)					
Casey Matthews; LB	Agoura Hills, CA	Oaks Christian School	6 ft 1.5 in (1.87 m)	220 lb (100 kg)	4.7	Jul 29, 2006
Casey Matthews; LB	Recruit ratings: Scout: Rivals: (78)					
Dominic Glover; DE	Mission Viejo, CA	Mission Viejo HS	6 ft 4 in (1.93 m)	238 lb (108 kg)	4.9	Feb 1, 2007
Dominic Glover; DE	Recruit ratings: Scout: Rivals: (75)					
Talmadge Jackson; CB	Temecula, CA	Chaparral HS	5 ft 9 in (1.75 m)	183 lb (83 kg)	4.5	Oct 1, 2006
Talmadge Jackson; CB	Recruit ratings: Scout: Rivals: (74)					
Brandon Hanna; MLB	Coeur d'Alene, ID	Lake City HS	6 ft 3 in (1.91 m)	220 lb (100 kg)	4.6	Aug 2, 2006
Brandon Hanna; MLB	Recruit ratings: Scout: Rivals: (73)					
Charles Neal; FB	Anaheim, CA	Esperanza HS	6 ft 2 in (1.88 m)	210 lb (95 kg)	4.7	Jul 7, 2006
Charles Neal; FB	Recruit ratings: Scout: Rivals: (69)					
David Paulson; TE	Lake Tapps, WA	Auburn Riverside HS	6 ft 5 in (1.96 m)	228 lb (103 kg)	4.7	Aug 24, 2006
David Paulson; TE	Recruit ratings: Scout: Rivals: (88)					
Tonio Celotto; DT	Piedmont, CA	Piedmont HS	6 ft 4 in (1.93 m)	245 lb (111 kg)	4.6	Jun 25, 2006
Tonio Celotto; DT	Recruit ratings: Scout: Rivals: (40)					
Jeffrey Maehl; CB	Paradise, CA	Paradise Senior HS	6 ft 2 in (1.88 m)	175 lb (79 kg)	4.7	May 4, 2006
Jeffrey Maehl; CB	Recruit ratings: Scout: Rivals: (40)					
Eddie Pleasant; S	La Palma, CA	Kennedy HS	5 ft 10 in (1.78 m)	205 lb (93 kg)	4.6	Jun 14, 2006
Eddie Pleasant; S	Recruit ratings: Scout: Rivals: (40)					
Rishard Matthews; WR	Santa Ana, CA	Saddleback HS	6 ft 1 in (1.85 m)	183 lb (83 kg)	4.5	Jan 14, 2007
Rishard Matthews; WR	Recruit ratings: Scout: Rivals: (40)					
Terrell Turner; SLB	Los Angeles, CA	Crenshaw Senior HS	6 ft 3 in (1.91 m)	225 lb (102 kg)	4.7	Jan 21, 2007
Terrell Turner; SLB	Recruit ratings: Scout: Rivals: (40)					
Mark Asper; OL	Idaho Falls, ID	Bonneville HS	6 ft 8 in (2.03 m)	278 lb (126 kg)	5.1	Nov 9, 2006
Mark Asper; OL	Recruit ratings: Scout: Rivals: (40)					
John Laidet; MLB	Bonanza, OR	Bonanza School	6 ft 5 in (1.96 m)	223 lb (101 kg)	4.7	Jan 14, 2006
John Laidet; MLB	Recruit ratings: Scout: Rivals: (40)					
Daniel Padilla; K	Corona, CA	Corona Senior HS	6 ft 1 in (1.85 m)	200 lb (91 kg)	NA	Dec 18, 2006
Daniel Padilla; K	Recruit ratings: Scout: Rivals: (40)					
Aaron Pflugrad; WR	Eugene, OR	Sheldon HS	5 ft 10 in (1.78 m)	162 lb (73 kg)	4.6	Jan 21, 2007
Aaron Pflugrad; WR	Recruit ratings: Scout: Rivals: (40)					
William Wallace; CB	West Covina, CA	West Covina HS	5 ft 11 in (1.80 m)	175 lb (79 kg)	4.4	Feb 1, 2007
William Wallace; CB	Recruit ratings: Scout: Rivals: (40)					
Overall recruit ranking: Scout: 9 Rivals: 11 ESPN: 23
‡ Refers to 40-yard dash; Note: In many cases, Scout, Rivals, 247Sports, On3, and ESPN may conflict in their listings of height, weight and 40 time.; In these cases, the average was taken. ESPN grades are on a 100-point scale.; Sources: "Oregon 2007 Football Commitments". Rivals.; "2007 Oregon Commits". Scout.; "2007 Player Commitments – Oregon". ESPN.; "Scout.com Team Recruiting Rankings". Scout.; "2007 Team Ranking". Rivals.com.

== Schedule ==
Date	Time	Opponent	Rank	Site	TV	Result	Attendance
September 1	12:30 pm	Houston*		Autzen Stadium; Eugene, OR	OSN	W 48–27	57,662
September 8	12:30 pm	at Michigan*		Michigan Stadium; Ann Arbor, MI	ABC	W 39–7	109,733
September 15	3:30 pm	Fresno State*	No. 19	Autzen Stadium; Eugene, OR	OSN	W 52–21	58,525
September 22	7:00 pm	at Stanford	No. 13	Stanford Stadium; Stanford, CA (rivalry)		W 55–31	35,019
September 29	12:30 pm	No. 6 California	No. 11	Autzen Stadium; Eugene, OR (College GameDay)	ABC	L 24–31	59,273
October 13	12:30 pm	Washington State^{†}	No. 9	Autzen Stadium; Eugene, OR		W 53–7	58,749
October 20	4:30 pm	at Washington	No. 7	Husky Stadium; Seattle, WA (rivalry)	FSN	W 55–34	66,481
October 27	12:00 pm	No. 9 USC	No. 5	Autzen Stadium; Eugene, OR (rivalry)	FSN	W 24–17	59,277
November 3	3:45 pm	No. 6 Arizona State	No. 4	Autzen Stadium; Eugene, OR (College GameDay)	ESPN	W 35–23	59,379
November 15	6:00 pm	at Arizona	No. 2	Arizona Stadium; Tucson, AZ	ESPN	L 24–34	50,387
November 24	12:30 pm	at UCLA	No. 9	Rose Bowl; Pasadena, CA	ABC	L 0–16	72,434
December 1	1:30 pm	Oregon State	No. 18	Autzen Stadium; Eugene, OR (Civil War)	ESPN2	L 31–38 ^{2OT}	59,050
December 31	11:00 am	vs. No. 21 South Florida*		Sun Bowl; El Paso, TX (Sun Bowl)	CBS	W 56–21	49,867
*Non-conference game; ^{†}Homecoming; Rankings from AP Poll released prior to the game; All times are in Pacific time

== Game summaries ==
=== Houston ===
Team	1	2	3	4	Total
Houston	7	10	10	0	27
• Oregon	14	6	21	7	48

- Date: September 1
- Location: Autzen Stadium, Eugene, Oregon

Passing Leaders	Rushing Leaders	Receiving Leaders
Dennis Dixon: 9/15, 134 Yards, 2 Touchdowns	Dennis Dixon: 15 Carries, 141 Yards, 1 Touchdown	Brian Paysinger: 4 Receptions, 63 Yards, 1 Touchdown
	Jeremiah Johnson: 11 Carries, 70 Yards, 2 Touchdowns	Jaison Williams: 2 Receptions, 31 Yards, 1 Touchdown
	Jonathan Stewart: 14 Carries, 67 Yards	Garren Strong: 2 Receptions, 31 Yards

Oregon's Dennis Dixon ran for 141 yards, with an 80-yard run that resulted in a touchdown. Dixon also threw for 134 yards and two touchdowns, completing nine of 15 passes. Houston's Anthony Alridge converted 22 carries into 205 yards and one touchdown. Adridge also caught three passes for 88 yards and a touchdown. Dixon's 141 rushing yards were the most by an Oregon quarterback since Tony Graziani's 108 yards against Oregon State in 1995. The score was tied at 20 points in the third quarter when Houston's Case Keenum attempted to throw a pass to Perry McDaniel in the end zone, but it was intercepted by Patrick Chung. The Ducks then went ahead 27 to 20 after Dixon threw a 24-yard touchdown pass to Brian Paysinger. Forty seconds after the Paysinger touchdown, Dixon threw another to Jaison Williams, putting the Ducks up 34 to 20. Houston scored once more and Oregon twice more as the Ducks beat Houston 48 to 27.

The game was also notable for a skirmish between the Ducks' mascot and the Cougars' mascot. The student fulfilling the role of the Duck was suspended soon after. The fight can be viewed on Video on YouTube.

=== Michigan ===
Team	1	2	3	4	Total
• Oregon	11	21	7	0	39
Michigan	7	0	0	0	7

- Date: September 8
- Location: Michigan Stadium, Ann Arbor, Michigan

Passing Leaders	Rushing Leaders	Receiving Leaders
Dennis Dixon: 16/25, 292 Yards, 3 Touchdowns	Jonathan Stewart: 15 Carries, 111 Yards, 1 Touchdown	Brian Paysinger: 4 Receptions, 97 Yards, 1 Touchdown
Brady Leaf: 1/1, 1 Yard	Jeremiah Johnson: 13 Carries, 89 Yards	Derrick Jones: 3 Receptions, 75 Yards, 1 Touchdown
	Dennis Dixon: 16 Carries, 76 Yards, 1 Touchdown	Jaison Williams: 4 Receptions, 73 Yards, 1 Touchdown

This game was Michigan's worst defeat since 1968 when they lost 50–14 at Ohio State. Dennis Dixon accounted for 368 yards and a career-high 4 touchdowns. Three touchdowns were thrown to three different receivers for 85, 61, and 45-yard scoring passes on Dixon's way to 292 throwing yards. Dixon also rushed for 76 yards and one touchdown. The Ducks led by 25 at halftime, and faced little opposition in the second half. According to Oregon coach Mike Bellotti the game was a "good win because I think there were some questions about how Michigan was going to bounce back, and whether we would be competitive. I think our players took that to heart." With this game Michigan opened the season with two home losses, the first time that had happened since 1959. It also gave them a losing streak of four games, the most in four decades. Wolverines coach Lloyd Carr said "We have good kids and they're hurting. If losing doesn't make you hurt, you shouldn't be at Michigan."

=== Fresno State ===
Team	1	2	3	4	Total
Fresno St	6	8	0	7	21
• Oregon	21	21	0	10	52

- Date: September 15
- Location: Autzen Stadium, Eugene, Oregon

Passing Leaders	Rushing Leaders	Receiving Leaders
Dennis Dixon: 14/20, 139 Yards, 2 Touchdowns	Jonathan Stewart: 17 Carries, 165 Yards, 2 Touchdowns	Jaison Williams: 5 Receptions, 50 Yards
Brady Leaf: 1/3, 15 Yards	Dennis Dixon: 8 Carries, 59 Yards, 1 Touchdown	Jeremiah Johnson: 1 Reception, 35 Yards, 1 Touchdown
	Andre Crenshaw: 11 Carries, 52 Yards, 1 Touchdown	Ed Dickson: 3 Receptions, 27 Yards, 1 Touchdown

Oregon's 52–21 defeat of Fresno State was Bellotti's 100th win as a coach at the University of Oregon. Dennis Dixon threw for two touchdowns and ran for another. Ducks running back Jonathan Stewart ran for 165 yards and scored two touchdowns, one touchdown being part of an 88-yard run. Dixon said "The sky's the limit right now. This offense is really clicking." Although Dixon didn't put up numbers as impressive as he did at Michigan the previous week, he had a solid performance, completing 14 for 20 passes for 139 yards and running for 59 yards. Oregon's mascot was suspended and watched the game, but not from the sidelines. Fresno State's quarterback Tom Brandstater completed 18–32 passes for 219 yards and one touchdown. The loss was Fresno State's second against a ranked team on the road. The previous week the Bulldogs lost 47–45 to Texas A&M in triple overtime. Fresno State coach Pat Hill said "[h]ow many times do I have to say it? We got dominated in all three phases. We got beat pretty good today. That doesn't happen at Fresno State very often. Today we got beat by a better football team. They took it to us. End of conversation."

=== Stanford ===
Team	1	2	3	4	Total
• Oregon	21	3	21	10	55
Stanford	3	28	0	0	31

- Date: September 22
- Location: Stanford Stadium, Stanford, California

Passing Leaders	Rushing Leaders	Receiving Leaders
Dennis Dixon: 23/36, 367 Yards, 4 Touchdowns	Jonathan Stewart: 19 Carries, 160 Yards, 1 Touchdown	Cameron Colvin: 8 Receptions, 163 Yards, 1 Touchdown
Brady Leaf: 0/1, 0 Yards	Jeremiah Johnson: 14 Carries, 60 Yards, 1 Touchdown	Jaison Williams: 7 Receptions, 113 Yards, 2 Touchdown
	Dennis Dixon: 9 Carries, 15 Yards, 1 Touchdown	Ed Dickson: 3 Receptions, 55 Yards, 1 Touchdown

The Ducks beat the Cardinal 55 to 31.

=== California ===
Team	1	2	3	4	Total
• California	0	3	7	21	31
Oregon	3	7	7	7	24

- Date: September 29
- Location: Autzen Stadium, Eugene, Oregon

Passing Leaders	Rushing Leaders	Receiving Leaders
Dennis Dixon: 31/44, 306 Yards, 1 Touchdown, 2 Interceptions	Jonathan Stewart: 21 Carries, 120 Yards, 1 Touchdown	Cameron Colvin: 7 Receptions, 74 Yards, 1 Touchdown
	Jeremiah Johnson: 8 Carries, 40 Yards	Jaison Williams: 4 Receptions, 70 Yards
	Dennis Dixon: 8 Carries, 17 Yards, 1 Touchdown	Ed Dickson: 6 Receptions, 67 Yards

The Bears defeated the Ducks 31 to 24. ESPN College GameDay was present (Corso picked Ducks to win)

=== Washington State ===
Team	1	2	3	4	Total
Washington St	0	0	7	0	7
• Oregon	17	23	10	3	53

- Date: October 13
- Location: Autzen Stadium, Eugene, Oregon

Scoring summary
1	11:38	ORE	Jeremiah Johnson 42-yard run (Matt Evensen kick)	Oregon 7-0
1	5:19	ORE	Matt Evensen 44-yard field goal	Oregon 10-0
1	:06	ORE	Jeremiah Johnson 18-yard run (Matt Evensen kick)	Oregon 17-0
2	10:44	ORE	Safety, Alex Brink tackled by Nick Reed in end zone	Oregon 19-0
2	6:52	ORE	Dennis Dixon 1-yard run (Matt Evensen kick)	Oregon 26-0
2	2:22	ORE	Jaison Williams 22-yard pass from Dennis Dixon (Matt Evensen kick)	Oregon 33-0
2	1:20	ORE	Derrick Jones 10-yard pass from Dennis Dixon (Matt Evensen kick)	Oregon 40-0
3	13:01	ORE	Aaron Pflugrad 22-yard pass from Dennis Dixon (Matt Evensen kick)	Oregon 47-0
3	10:47	WSU	Michael Bumpus 8-yard pass from Alex Brink (Romeen Abdollmohammadi kick)	Oregon 47-7
3	5:47	ORE	Daniel Padilla 43-yard field goal	Oregon 50-7
4	7:35	ORE	Daniel Padilla 39-yard field goal	Oregon 53-7

Passing Leaders	Rushing Leaders	Receiving Leaders
Dennis Dixon: 21/28, 287 Yards, 3 Touchdowns	Jonathan Stewart: 13 Carries, 66 Yards	Jaison Williams: 4 Receptions, 108 Yards, 1 Touchdown
Brady Leaf: 4/6, 41 Yards	Jeremiah Johnson: 4 Carries, 63 Yards, 2 Touchdowns	Ed Dickson: 3 Receptions, 70 Yards
Justin Roper: 1/1, 10 Yards	Remene Alston Jr.: 13 Carries, 26 Yards	Aaron Pflugrad: 4 Receptions, 47 Yards, 1 Touchdown

The Ducks defeated the Cougars 53 to 7.

=== Washington ===
Team	1	2	3	4	Total
• Oregon	17	7	7	24	55
Washington	7	10	14	3	34

- Date: October 20
- Location: Husky Stadium, Seattle, Washington

Scoring summary
1	11:06	Oregon	Garrett Strong 2-yard pass from Dennis Dixon (Matt Evensen kick)	Oregon 7–0
1	5:01	Oregon	Jonathan Stewart 1-yard run (Matt Evensen kick)	Oregon 14–0
1	4:42	Washington	Anthony Russo 83-yard pass from Jake Locker (Ryan Perkins kick)	Oregon 14–7
1	2:16	Oregon	Matt Evensen 25-yard field goal	Oregon 17–7
2	7:18	Washington	Marcel Reece 26-yard pass from Jake Locker (Ryan Perkins kick)	Oregon 17–14
2	6:06	Oregon	Jonathan Stewart 12-yard run (Matt Evensen kick)	Oregon 24–14
2	0:41	Washington	Ryan Perkins 21-yard field goal	Oregon 24–17
3	12:06	Washington	Louis Rankin 43-yard pass from Jake Locker (Ryan Perkins kick)	Tie 24–24
3	3:38	Oregon	Andre Crenshaw 17-yard run (Matt Evensen kick)	Oregon 31–24
3	1:12	Washington	Marcel Reece 38-yard pass from Jake Locker (Ryan Perkins kick)	Tie 31–31
4	12:54	Oregon	Andre Crenshaw 5-yard run (Matt Evensen kick)	Oregon 38–31
4	8:21	Oregon	Matt Evensen 47-yard field goal	Oregon 41–31
4	5:58	Washington	Ryan Perkins 42-yard field goal	Oregon 41–34
4	4:52	Oregon	Dennis Dixon 13-yard run (Matt Evensen kick)	Oregon 48–34
4	2:20	Oregon	Remene Alston 4-yard run (Matt Evensen kick)	Oregon 55–34

Passing Leaders	Rushing Leaders	Receiving Leaders
Dennis Dixon: 19/30, 196 Yards, 1 Touchdown, 1 Interception	Jonathan Stewart: 32 Carries, 251 Yards, 2 Touchdowns	Jaison Williams: 5 Receptions, 60 Yards
	Andre Crenshaw: 15 Carries, 113 Yards, 2 Touchdowns	Garren Strong: 5 Receptions, 53 Yards, 1 Touchdown
	Dennis Dixon: 12 Carries, 99 Yards, 1 Touchdown	Aaron Pflugrad: 5 Receptions, 51 Yards

The Ducks defeated the Huskies 55 to 34.

=== USC ===
#9 USC Trojans (6–1) at #5 Oregon Ducks (6–1)

Quarter	1	2	3	4	Total
USC	0	3	7	7	17
Oregon	7	3	7	7	24

at Autzen Stadium • Eugene, Oregon

- Date: October 27
- Game time: 12:00 p.m. PDT
- Game weather: Sunny • 55 °F (13 °C) • Wind NE 3 miles per hour (4.8 km/h; 2.6 kn)
- Game attendance: 59,277
- Referee: Jack Folliard
- Scoring Summary Final

Game information

USC

- Mark Sanchez
  26/41, 277 Yds, 2 TD, 2 INT
- Chauncey Washington
  11 Rush, 42 Yds
- Patrick Turner
  7 Rec, 107 Yds, TD

Oregon

- Dennis Dixon
  16/25, 157 Yds
- Jonathan Stewart
  25 Rush, 103 Yds, 2 TD
- Ed Dickson
  5 Rec, 69 Yds

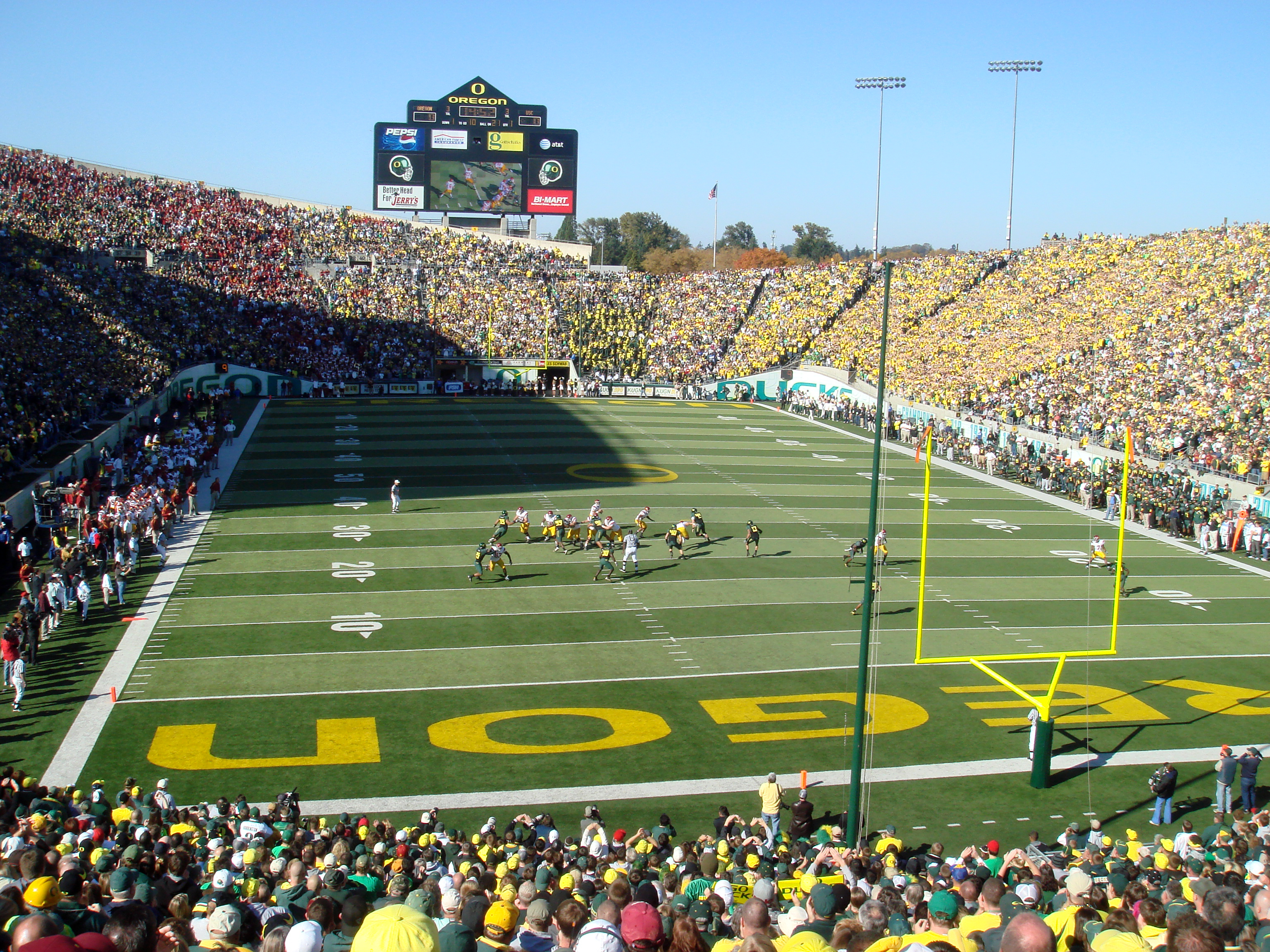

The Ducks defeated the Trojans 24 to 17. Oregon's defensive back Matthew Harper interception on USC's final drive preserved Oregon's victory. Harper said "We knew somebody would make the play, and luckily it was me." Oregon's victory set them up for a chance at the national championship. Number 12 USC (No. 9 AP) lost after Oregon's Jonathan Stewart rushed for 103 yards and two touchdowns, while Dennis Dixon completed 16 of 25 passes for 157 yards. Oregon was fifth in the BCS standings, and Dixon became a serious Heisman contender with his 76 rushing yards and 157 passing yards.

Scoring summary

Quarter	Time	Drive			Team	Scoring information	Score	
Quarter	Time	Plays	Yards	TOP	Team	Scoring information	USC	ORE
1	2:50	13	72	4:51	Oregon	Dennis Dixon 2-yard touchdown run, Matt Evensen kick good	0	7
2	10:27	9	20	3:58	USC	30-yard field goal by David Buehler	3	7
2	0:15	11	58	1:45	Oregon	41-yard field goal by Matt Evensen	3	10
3	10:53	10	62	4:07	USC	Patrick Turner 9-yard touchdown reception from Matt Sanchez, David Buehler kick good	10	10
3	5:25	2	16	0:50	Oregon	Jonathan Stewart 16-yard touchdown run, Matt Evensen kick good	10	17
4	11:39	10	58	4:50	Oregon	Jonathan Stewart 1-yard touchdown run, Matt Evensen kick good	10	24
4	4:44	5	85	0:48	USC	David Ausberry 14-yard touchdown reception from Mark Sanchez, David Buehler kick good	17	24
"TOP" = time of possession. For other American football terms, see Glossary of American football.							17	24

=== Arizona State ===
Team	1	2	3	4	Total
Arizona St	3	10	3	7	23
• Oregon	14	7	14	0	35

- Date: November 3
- Location: Autzen Stadium, Eugene, Oregon

Passing Leaders	Rushing Leaders	Receiving Leaders
Dennis Dixon: 13/22, 189 Yards, 4 Touchdowns	Jonathan Stewart: 21 Carries, 99 Yards, 1 Touchdown	Jaison Williams: 5 Receptions, 106 Yards, 2 Touchdowns
Brady Leaf: 2/4, 11 Yards	Dennis Dixon: 11 Carries, 57 Yards	Drew Davis: 2 Receptions, 28 Yards, 1 Touchdown
	Andre Crenshaw: 5 Carries, 31 Yards	Jonathan Stewart: 2 Receptions, 26 Yards, 1 Touchdown

In a game that was considered important enough for ESPN's College Gameday to be broadcast in Eugene, the Oregon Ducks defeated the Arizona State Sun Devils 35–23. Heisman hopeful Dennis Dixon threw for 189 yards and 4 touchdowns and led the Ducks to a victory that places Oregon in the lead for the Pac-10 championship.

After the Ducks scored a touchdown on their first possession, a 26-yard pass to WR Jaison Williams, the Sun Devils began to march down the field. Showing the same poise as Dixon, ASU QB Rudy Carpenter led the Devils to the Oregon 2-yard line before the Oregon defense lived up to their "bend but don't break" style and held ASU to a field goal. That goal line stop would set the tone for the remainder of the game as Oregon held Arizona State to only 3 points in the first quarter and 13 in the first half.

Trailing 13–21 at the half, Arizona State was able to make a field goal on their first possession in the second half, cutting the Oregon lead to 5. However, the Ducks were able to score the next 14 points of the game, giving the Ducks a 35–16 lead with one quarter left to play. Unfortunately approximately 2 minutes into the fourth quarter, Dennis Dixon was taken out after an awkward tackle and sat out the remainder of the game. Luckily his injury did not seem serious and he was seen jogging on the sidelines soon afterwards.

Arizona State did score one more touchdown later in the fourth quarter, making the score its final 35–23. In a game which Rudy Carpenter was sacked 9 times, it seemed only fitting that the last play of the game was a sack as time ran out.

=== Arizona ===
Team	1	2	3	4	Total
Oregon	11	3	3	7	24
• Arizona	10	21	0	3	34

- Date: November 15
- Location: Arizona Stadium, Tucson, Arizona

Passing Leaders	Rushing Leaders	Receiving Leaders
Brady Leaf: 22/46, 163 Yards, 2 Interceptions	Jonathan Stewart: 28 Carries, 131 Yards	Jaison Williams: 8 Receptions, 120 Yards
Dennis Dixon: 5/8, 62 Yards, 1 Interception	Kwame Agyeman: 1 Carry, 40 Yards	Ed Dickson: 6 Receptions, 44 Yards
	Dennis Dixon: 2 Carries, 34 Yards, 1 Touchdown	Derrick Jones: 6 Receptions, 24 Yards

The Ducks entered the game ranked No. 2 in both the AP poll and the BCS standings. A win in this game, followed by wins against UCLA and Oregon State, would almost assuredly result in a berth in the BCS National Championship Game in New Orleans. The Ducks started the game hot, with a 39-yard touchdown run by Dennis Dixon and a successful two-point conversion. Following an Arizona interception, the Ducks had the ball back on the Arizona 4-yard line threatening to score again. However, Dixon threw an interception that was returned 45 yards and eventually capitalized by the Wildcats as a touchdown, cutting the score to 8–7. The Ducks responded with another solid drive getting the ball to the Arizona 15 and looked set to score again. On 2nd and 7, Oregon quarterback Dennis Dixon (the leading Heisman candidate at this point of the season) fell to the ground without being touched. Upon review it was clear that Dixon twisted his already-injured knee and tore his ACL. It would later be revealed that Dixon had actually torn the ligament in the previous week's game against Arizona State.

Following the injury, Dixon—having amassed 183 yards on 19 plays—was replaced by Brady Leaf. Oregon's misfortunes mounted: Arizona scored a touchdown on an interception return, another on a punt return, and Leaf suffered an ankle injury, all before halftime. Oregon tried to rally from the 31–14 halftime deficit, but lost 34–24, ending their national championship hopes. The following day it was announced that Dixon's injury would end his season, and any hopes of a Heisman Trophy.

=== UCLA ===
Team	1	2	3	4	Total
Oregon	0	0	0	0	0
• UCLA	3	3	3	7	16

- Date: November 24

Passing Leaders	Rushing Leaders	Receiving Leaders
Cody Kempt: 6/23, 52 Yards, 2 Interceptions	Jonathan Stewart: 13 Carries, 33 Yards	Jaison Williams: 4 Receptions, 44 Yards
Brady Leaf: 4/11, 45 Yards	Andre Crenshaw: 11 Carries, 22 Yards	Ed Dickson: 5 Receptions, 31 Yards
Justin Roper: 1/5, 8 Yards, 1 Interception	Jeffrey Maehl: 2 Carries, 14 Yards	Jeffrey Maehl: 2 Receptions, 30 Yards

=== Oregon State ===
Team	1	2	3	4	OT	2OT	Total
• Oregon St	14	7	0	7	3	7	38
Oregon	7	14	7	0	3	0	31

- Date: December 1
- Location: Autzen Stadium, Eugene, Oregon

Passing Leaders	Rushing Leaders	Receiving Leaders
Justin Roper: 13/25, 144 Yards, 2 Touchdowns, 1 Interception	Jonathan Stewart: 39 Carries, 163 Yards	Jeffrey Maehl: 4 Receptions, 86 Yards, 1 Touchdown
Cody Kempt: 0/3	Andre Crenshaw: 5 Carries, 15 Yards	Ed Dickson: 3 Receptions, 17 Yards
	Ed Dickson: 1 Carry, 10 Yards	Jaison Williams: 2 Receptions, 16 Yards

As of the 111th game in the series, the Ducks lead 55–46–10 all time. This was the first time the home team had not won since 1996, the first time Oregon State had won at Autzen Stadium since 1993, and the first time Oregon State had won two years in a row since 1973–74.

=== Sun Bowl ===
Team	1	2	3	4	Total
South Florida	0	14	0	7	21
• Oregon	8	10	28	10	56

- Date: December 31
- Location: Sun Bowl Stadium, El Paso, Texas

Passing Leaders	Rushing Leaders	Receiving Leaders
Justin Roper: 17/30, 180 Yards, 4 Touchdowns	Jonathan Stewart: 23 Carries, 253 Yards, 1 Touchdown	Jaison Williams: 4 Receptions, 40 Yards, 1 Touchdown
	Andre Crenshaw: 8 Carries, 52 Yards	Garren Strong: 3 Receptions, 36 Yards, 1 Touchdown
	Cody Kempt: 2 Carries, 23 Yards	Jonathan Stewart: 2 Receptions, 29 Yards, 1 Touchdown

After losing the last 3 games of the year, many analysts expected the Ducks to fare poorly in the Sun Bowl. But the Ducks came out strong. Making his first career start, freshman quarterback Justin Roper completed 17 of 30 passes for 180 yards with 4 touchdowns and no interceptions. Running back Jonathan Stewart rushed for a career-high and Sun Bowl record 253 yards and a touchdown and was named the Most Valuable Player of the game.

Oregon, despite being a 7-point underdog, dominated the game, especially the second half. Holding on to an 18–14 lead at the half, Oregon came out and outscored South Florida 28–0 in the third quarter. The Ducks won 56–21. The 56 points scored was a Sun Bowl record. Jonathan Stewart's 253 rushing yards were a Sun Bowl record. The 35-point margin of victory was the second largest of the 2007–2008 bowl season. The Ducks finished the season 9–4 with their first bowl win since the 2001 season. They finished the season ranked 23rd in the final Associated Press Poll.

== Rankings ==
Ranking movements Legend: ██ Increase in ranking ██ Decrease in ranking — = Not ranked
	Week															
Poll	Pre	1	2	3	4	5	6	7	8	9	10	11	12	13	14	Final
AP	—	—	19	13	11	14	9	10	5	5	3	2	9	17	—	23
Coaches	—	—	21	13	12	13	8	7	5	4	3	2	9	18	—	24
Harris	Not released				10	13	10	7	5	5	3	2	10	19	—	Not released
BCS	Not released							10	5	5	3	2	9	17	—	Not released

== Personnel ==
=== Roster ===
(as of 11/18/2007)
Center: 51 Jeff Kendall – Junior – Colorado Springs, Colo.; Cornerbacks: 6 Walter Thurmond III – Sophomore – West Covina, Calif.; 7 Chad Peppars – (redshirt) Freshman – Los Angeles, Calif.; 8 Brian Butterfield – Freshman – Sherwood, Ore.; 14 Javes Lewis – Freshman – Tustin, Calif.; 17 Willie Glasper – Sophomore – Pittsburg, Calif.; 18 Anthony Gildon – Freshman – Simi Valley, Calif.; 32 Jairus Byrd – Sophomore – Clayton, Mo.; 33 Chris Barber – Freshman – Hood River, Ore.; 37 Talmadge Jackson III – Freshman – Temecula, Calif.; Defensive backs: 21 William Taylor – Freshman – Trabuco Canyon, Calif.; 31 Justin Kam – Sophomore – Honolulu, Hawaii; Defensive ends: 39 Will Tukuafu – Sophomore – Salt Lake City, Utah; 49 Nick Reed – Junior – Trabuco Canyon, Calif.; 88 Brandon Bair – (redshirt) Freshman – St. Anthony, Idaho; 89 Michel DiVincenzo – Sophomore – Porter Ranch, Calif.; 95 Tonio Celotto – Freshman – Oakland, Calif.; 98 Dominic Glover – Freshman – Ladera Ranch, Calif.; Defensive tackles: 41 Matt Simms – Freshman – Caramel Valley, Calif.; 43 Michael Speed – Junior – Los Angeles, Calif.; 50 Simi Toeaina – Sophomore – Afono, Amer. Samoa; 65 Josh Pope – Junior – Selma, Ore.; 90 David Faaeteete – Senior – Medford, Ore.; 91 Ra'shon Harris – Junior – Pittsburgh, Calif.; 94 Hayden Piper – (redshirt) Freshman – Concord, Calif.; 96 Mike Bellagamba – Junior – Los Altos, Calif.; 97 Cole Linehan – Junior – Banks, Ore.; 99 Jeremy Gibbs – Senior – Stillwater, Okla.; Free safety: 1 Marvin Johnson – (redshirt) Freshman – Compton, Calif.; 9 Ryan DePalo – Senior – Beaverton, Ore.; 20 Matthew Harper – Senior – Union City, Calif.; 23 Jeffrey Maehl – Freshman – Paradise, Calif.; 27 Titus Jackson – Sophomore – Pomona, Calif.; Halfbacks: 46 Matt Larkin – Junior – Boise, Idaho; 47 Jason Turner – Junior – La Crescenta, Calif.	Linebackers: 25 Kevin Garrett – Sophomore – Carson, Calif.; 34 A.J. Tuitele – Senior – Wilmington, Calif.; 40 John Bacon* – Junior – Golden, Colo.; 44 Brandon Hanna – Freshman – Coeur d'Alene, Idaho; 45 Terrell Turner – Freshman – Los Angeles, Calif.; 48 Kyle Young – Freshman – Santa Rosa, Calif.; 52 Terrance Pritchett – Freshman – Sacramento, Calif.; 53 Erik Elshire – Junior – Bend, Ore.; 55 Casey Matthews – Freshman – Agoura Hills, Calif.; 56 Blake Thompson – Freshman – Cottage Grove, Ore.; 87 Josh Thomas-Dotson – Senior – Florence, Ore.; Long snappers: 59 Jeff King – Junior – Long Beach, Calif.; 84 Eric Steimer – Senior – Bend, Ore.; Offensive guards: 61 Josh Tschirgi – Senior – Vancouver, Wash.; 63 Jon Teague – Junior – Portland, Ore.; 66 Pat So'oalo – Senior – Kaneohe, Hawaii; 67 Sean Cullen – Senior – Janesville, Wis.; Offensive linemen: 54 Jordan Holmes – (redshirt) Freshman – Yuba City, Calif.; 64 Max Forer – (redshirt) Freshman – Santa Monica, Calif.; 68 C.E. Kaiser – (redshirt) Freshman – Veradale, Wash.; 69 Bo Thran – (redshirt) Freshman – Gresham, Ore.; 70 Ramsen Golpashin – Freshman –; 71 Mark Lewis – Junior – Arroyo Grande, Calif.; 74 Darrion Weems – Freshman – Winnetka, Calif.; 79 Mark Asper – Freshman – Idaho Falls, Idaho; Offensive tackles: 57 Fenuki Tupou – Junior – Elverta, Calif.; 60 Max Unger – Junior – Honaunau, Hawai'i; 75 Geoff Schwartz – Senior – Los Angeles, Calif.; 76 Charlie Carmichael – Freshman – Sherman Oaks, Calif.; 78 Jacob Hucko – Junior – Buena Park, Calif.; Punters: 26 Tim Taylor – Sophomore – Corvallis, Ore.; 80 Josh Syria – Junior – Wenatchee, Wash.; Place kickers: 23 Morgan Flint – Sophomore – Bend, Ore.; 41 Daniel Padilla – Freshman – Corona, Calif.; 85 Matt Evensen – Junior – Portland, Ore.; 92 Justin Dougherty – Junior – Ridgefield, Wash.	Quarterbacks: 2 Cade Cooper – Junior – Lehi, Utah; 7 Nate Costa* – Sophomore – Hilmar, Calif.; 10 Dennis Dixon* – Senior – San Leandro, Calif.; 11 Justin Roper – (redshirt) Freshman – Buford, Ga.; 12 Cody Kempt – (redshirt) Freshman – Beaverton, Ore.; 16 Brady Leaf – Senior – Great Falls, Mont.; 17 Sam Doman – Sophomore – Canby, Ore.; Running backs: 5 Remene Alston Jr. – (redshirt) Freshman – Greensboro, N.C.; 22 Andre Crenshaw – Sophomore – Lancaster, Calif.; 24 Jeremiah Johnson* – Junior – Los Angeles, Calif.; 26 Matachi Lewis – Freshman – Oxnard, Calif.; 27 Andiel Brown – Senior – Portland, Ore.; 28 Jonathan Stewart – Junior – Lacey, Wash.; 33 Charles Neal – Freshman – Yorba Linda, Calif.; Rovers: 2 T.J. Ward – Sophomore – Antioch, Calif.; 5 Caleb Tommasini – Junior – Winston, Ore.; 15 Patrick Chung – Junior – Rancho Cucamonga, Calif.; 29 Todd Doxey – Freshman – San Diego, Calif; Strong Side Linebackers: 13 Jerome Boyd – Junior – Los Angeles, Calif.; 30 Kwame Agyeman – Senior – Itasca, Ill.; 35 Spencer Paysinger – (redshirt) Freshman – Los Angeles, Calif.; 38 Eddie Pleasant – Freshman – La Palma, Calif.; 54 Riley Showalter – Sophomore – Portland, Ore.; Tight ends: 39 Chris DiVincenzo – Freshman – Porter Ranch, Calif.; 48 John Laidet – Freshman – Bonanza, Ore.; 81 Ryan Keeling – Junior – Springfield, Ore.; 83 Ed Dickson – Sophomore – Bellflower, Calif.; Wide receivers: 3 Cameron Colvin* – Senior – Pittsburg, Calif.; 4 Jaison Williams – Junior – Inglewood, Calif.; 6 Derrick Jones – Sophomore – Gardena, Calif.; 8 Terence Scott – Junior – Knoxville, Tenn.; 14 Elvis Akpla – Freshman – Portland, Ore.; 18 Jamere Holland – (redshirt) Freshman – Pacoima, Calif.; 19 Brian Paysinger* – Senior – Long Beach, Calif.; 21 Garren Strong – Senior – San Jose, Calif.; 82 Drew Davis – Freshman – Denver, Colo.; 87 Daniel Barkley – Freshman – Sacramento, Calif.; 89 Aaron Pflugrad – Freshman – Eugene, Ore.; 91 Rory Cavaille – Sophomore – Shelton, Wash.; 93 Zack McGinnis – Junior – Roseburg, Ore.; 94 Michael Mackie – Freshman – Glen Rock, New Jersey; 96 Kyle Anderson – (redshirt) Freshman – Fort Collins, Colo.; 96 Terrell Robinson – Junior – Irvine, Calif.; 98 Zack Test – Freshman – Woodside, Calif.
* Injured

=== Coaching staff ===
- Mike Bellotti – Head coach
- Steve Greatwood – Offensive line
- Nick Aliotti – Defensive coordinator
- Chip Kelly – Offensive coordinator & quarterbacks
- Gary campbell – Running backs
- Michael gray – Defensive line
- John neal – Secondary
- Tom osborne – Tight ends & special teams
- Don Pellum – Linebackers & recruiting coordinator
- Robin Pflugrad – Wide receivers
- Jim Radcliffe – Head strength and conditioning coach
- Eddy morrissey – Graduate assistant coach
- Jeff hawkins – Assistant athletic director/football operations

== Awards ==
- Mike Bellotti
  - Selected as a semifinalist for the George Munger Award for College Coach of the Year.
  - Named to the Paul "Bear" Bryant College Football Coach of the Year award.
- Patrick Chung
  - Selected to the Pac-10 All Conference First Team Defense.
- Dennis Dixon
  - Awarded Pac-10 Offensive Player of the Week, USA Today Player of the Week, and Rivals.com Player of the Week for his efforts against the Michigan Wolverines on September 8.
  - Awarded Pac-10 Offensive Player of the Week for his efforts against the Stanford Cardinal on September 22.
  - Named to the Maxwell Award watch list.
  - Named a finalist for the Maxwell Award along with Darren McFadden and Tim Tebow.
  - Named as one of 15 National Scholar-Athletes by The National Football Foundation & College Football Hall of Fame and is now a finalist for the Draddy Trophy.
  - Selected as one of 15 semifinalists for the Davey O'Brien Award.
  - Named a finalist for the Davey O'Brien Award along with Tim Tebow and Chase Daniel.
  - Awarded Pac-10 Offensive Co-Player of the Week for his efforts against the Arizona State Sun Devils on November 3.
  - Selected to the ESPN the Magazine Academic All-District 8 first team by college and university sports information directors throughout the western portion of the United States and Canada. District 8 includes Alaska, Arizona, California, Hawaii, Idaho, Nevada, Oregon, Utah, Washington, British Columbia and the Yukon. Dixon is now eligible for ESPN the Magazine Academic All-American consideration.
  - Named as one of 15 players eligible for the Walter Camp Player of the Year Award.
  - Front runner for the Heisman Trophy according to ESPN panelists before suffering a torn ACL, effectively ending his season during the game at Arizona.
  - Announced as one of five finalists for the Walter Camp Award, the other four finalists were Chase Daniel, Matt Ryan, Tim Tebow, and Darren McFadden.
  - Selected to the Pac-10 All Conference First Team Offense, as well as the Pac-10 Offensive Player of the Year.
- Matt Evensen
  - Selected as a semifinalist for the Lou Groza Award by the Palm Beach County Sports Commission.
- Matthew Harper
  - Awarded Pac-10 Defensive Player of the Week and National Defensive Player of the Week by the Master Coaches Survey for his efforts against the Southern California Trojans on October 28.
- Nick Reed
  - Named to the Ted Hendricks Award watch list.
  - Awarded Pac-10 Defensive Player of the Week and National Defensive Player of the Week by the Walter Camp Football Foundation for his efforts against the Washington State Cougars on October 13.
  - Awarded Pac-10 Defensive Player of the Week for his efforts against the Arizona State Sun Devils on November 3.
  - Selected to the ESPN the Magazine Academic All-District 8 first team by college and university sports information directors throughout the western portion of the United States and Canada. District 8 includes Alaska, Arizona, California, Hawaii, Idaho, Nevada, Oregon, Utah, Washington, British Columbia and the Yukon. Reed is now eligible for ESPN the Magazine Academic All-American consideration.
  - Selected to the Pac-10 All Conference First Team Defense.
- Geoff Schwartz
  - Selected to the Pac-10 All Conference Second Team Offense.
- Jonathan Stewart
  - Named to the Maxwell Award watch list.
  - Awarded Pac-10 Offensive Player of the Week for his efforts against the Washington Huskies on October 20.
  - Named as one of 10 semifinalists for the Doak Walker Award.
  - Selected to the Pac-10 All Conference First Team Offense and Second Team Specialists as a Kickoff Returner.
- Fenuki Tupou
  - Selected to the Pac-10 All Conference Second Team Offense.
- Max Unger
  - Selected to the Pac-10 All Conference First Team Offense.
- Jaison Williams
  - Named to the Biletnikoff Award watch list.

== Team records ==
- On September 8, the Oregon Ducks played in front of 109,733 spectators at the University of Michigan's Michigan Stadium, this total bettered their previous record of 102,247 spectators at the 1995 Rose Bowl against Penn State.
- On September 29, 59,273 fans packed Autzen Stadium, making it at the time the largest crowd to attend a football game in state history. The previous record was 59,269 against the Oklahoma Sooners on September 16, 2006.
- On October 20, against the Washington Huskies, the Oregon Ducks set a school record for rushing yards in a single game by the entire team, their total was 465 yards. The previous record was 446 yards against the Washington State Cougars in 2001. Also, during the game against the Huskies, RB Jonathan Stewart ran for 251 yards, which was good enough for the second highest total rushing yards in a single game by an individual in Oregon football history. The current record is 285 yards, held by Onterrio Smith during the game against Washington State in 2001.
- On October 27, 59,277 fans filled Autzen Stadium, making it the largest crowd to attend a football game in state history. The previous record was 59,273 against the California Bears on September 29.
- Also on October 27, the crowd at Autzen Stadium reached a noise level of 127.2 decibels, making it the loudest stadium in college football. The previous college record was 126 decibels at Clemson's Memorial Stadium. According to the Guinness Book of World Records the loudest outdoor stadium is Mile High Stadium, whose crowd reached a level of 128.7 decibels. However, this is not true, as during the October 6, 2007 game between the University of Florida @ Louisiana State University, CBS recorded 129.8 decibels.
- On November 3, for consecutive weeks the Oregon record for number of individuals at a football game had fallen. For the game against the Arizona State Sun Devils 59,379 people were in attendance at Autzen Stadium. The previous record was set on October 27 at 59,277 in attendance.
- Also on November 3, Dennis Dixon broke the team record for career yards by a quarterback. The previous record was 1,171 yards by Reggie Ogborn between 1979 and 1980.

== Statistics ==
=== Team ===
	Team	Opp
Scoring	496	307
Points per game	38.2	23.6
First downs	321	260
Rushing	174	97
Passing	133	134
Penalty	14	29
Total offense	6,078	4,966
Avg per play	5.9	5.1

	Team	Opp
Avg per game	467.5	382.0
Fumbles lost	29–14	18–13
Penalties – yards	79–715	83–696
Avg per game	55.0	53.5
Punts – yards	83–3,431	
Avg per punt	41.4	41.3
Time of possession/game	28:37	31:23

	Team	Opp
3rd down conversions	89/207	67/205
4th down conversions	6/14	9/21
Touchdowns scored	62	36
Field goals – attempts	19–24	18–24
PAT – attempts	59–59	33–34
Attendance	411,915	334,054
Neutral Attendance		49,867
Games/Avg per game	7/58,845	5/66,811

==== Scores by quarter ====
	1	2	3	4	OT	2OT	Total
Oregon	151	125	132	85	3	0	496
Opponents	60	117	51	69	3	7	307

=== Offense ===
==== Rushing ====
Name	GP	Att	Gain	Loss	Net	Avg	TD	Long	Avg/G
Jonathan Stewart	13	280	1,798	76	1,722	6.2	11	88	132.5
Dennis Dixon	10	105	741	158	583	5.6	9	80	58.3
Andre Crenshaw	13	82	445	30	415	5.1	4	39	31.9
Jeremiah Johnson	6	54	360	16	344	6.4	5	42	57.3
Derrick Jones	9	3	49	0	49	16.3	0	25	5.4
Remene Alston	7	25	66	24	42	1.7	1	10	6.0
Kwame Agyeman	13	1	40	0	40	40.0	0	40	3.1
Jeffrey Maehl	13	3	34	0	34	11.3	0	18	2.6
Brian Paysinger	4	3	25	0	25	8.3	1	14	6.2
Cody Kempt	3	8	31	10	21	2.6	0	17	7.0
Ed Dickson	13	2	10	0	10	5.0	0	10	0.8
Daniel Barkley	2	1	8	0	8	8.0	0	8	4.0
Pat So'oalo	13	0	7	0	7	0.0	0	0	0.5
Geoff Schwartz	13	1	3	0	3	3.0	0	3	0.2
Andiel Brown	11	2	2	0	2	1.0	0	2	0.2
Brady Leaf	11	18	64	62	2	0.1	0	14	0.2
Aaron Pflugrad	9	1	2	0	2	2.0	0	2	0.2
Justin Roper	4	15	51	50	1	0.1	1	13	0.2
Team	11	11	0	38	−38	−3.5	0	0	−3.5
Total	13	615	3,736	464	3,272	5.3	32	88	251.7

==== Passing ====
Name	GP	Effic	Cmp-Att-Int	Pct	Yds	TD	Lng	Avg/G
Dennis Dixon	10	161.2	172–254–4	67.7	2,136	20	85	213.6
Justin Roper	4	125.5	32–61–2	52.5	342	6	33	85.5
Brady Leaf	11	73.9	34–72–2	47.2	276	0	30	25.1
Cody Kempt	3	24.5	6–26–2	23.1	52	0	15	17.3
Total	13	132.1	244–413–10	59.1	2,806	26	85	215.8

==== Receiving ====
Name	GP	No.	Yds	Avg	TD	Long	Avg/G
Jaison Williams	13	55	844	15.3	8	52	64.9
Ed Dickson	13	43	453	10.5	3	46	34.8
Garren Strong	13	27	249	9.2	3	17	19.2
Johnathan Stewart	13	22	145	6.6	2	21	11.2
Cameron Colvin	6	20	248	12.4	2	71	41.3
Derrick Jones	9	19	199	10.5	2	61	22.1
Aaron Pflugrad	9	17	168	9.9	1	23	18.7
Brian Paysinger	4	9	165	18.3	2	85	41.2
Jeffrey Maehl	13	9	118	13.1	1	33	9.1
Jeremiah Johnson	6	7	98	14.0	1	35	16.3
Andre Crenshaw	13	4	17	4.2	0	7	1.3
Drew Davis	10	3	35	11.7	1	19	3.5
Malachi Lewis	13	3	26	8.7	0	18	2.0
Rory Cavaille	11	2	17	8.5	0	9	1.5
Terence Scott	5	2	4	2.0	0	5	0.8
Ryan Keeling	5	1	10	10.0	0	10	2.0
Matt Larkin	12	1	10	10.0	0	10	0.8
Total	13	244	2,806	11.5	26	85	215.8

=== Defense ===
Name	GP	Tackles				Sacks	Pass defense				Fumbles		Blkd kick	Saf
Name	GP	Solo	Ast	Total	TFL-yds	No-Yds	Int-Yds	BU	PD	QBH	Rcv-Yds	FF	Blkd kick	Saf
Patrick Chung	13	53	42	95	5.5–14	–	2–0	5	7	–	–	1	2	–
Walter Thurmond III	13	60	23	83	7.0–13	–	2–44	16	18	–	1–25	–	–	–
Matthew Harper	13	38	40	78	2.0–19	2.0–19	3–116	6	9	1	–	1	–	–
Jerome Boyd	13	35	23	58	10.0–34	3.0–21	1–0	2	3	–	1–0	1	–	–
Jairus Byrd	13	34	18	52	4.0–13	1.0–6	4–22	4	7	1	2–0	–	–	–
Nick Reed	13	21	24	45	19.5–104	11.0–93	–	–	–	1	–	–	–	–
Kwame Agyeman	13	26	18	44	6.0–14	1.0–7	–	2	2	2	–	–	–	–
John Bacon	9	18	24	42	1.5–2	–	1–49	1	2	–	–	–	–	–
Will Tukuafu	13	19	9	28	6.5–17	2.5–11	–	1	1	4	3–0	2	–	–
A.J. Tuitele	8	12	9	21	1.0–4	–	–	1	1	–	–	–	–	–
Jeremy Gibbs	13	10	10	20	4.0–20	3.0–19	–	1	1	8	–	–	–	–
Willie Glasper	13	11	9	20	1.0–3	–	–	–	–	–	1–0	–	–	–
Kevin Garrett	12	5	7	12	1.0–4	–	–	–	–	3	–	–	–	–
T.J. Ward	13	14	3	17	–	–	–	–	–	–	1–0	–	–	–
David Faaeteete	13	12	4	16	8.0–29	2.0–11	–	1	1	1	–	1	1	–
Cole Linehan	13	7	6	13	2.0–6	1.0–4	–	–	–	1	–	–	–	–
Casey Matthews	11	9	7	16	4.0–5	1.0–1	–	–	–	–	–	–	–	–
Tonio Celotto	11	6	5	11	3.0–9	–	–	1	1	1	–	–	–	–
Ra'Shon Harris	11	6	2	8	1.0–1	–	–	–	–	4	–	–	–	–
Jeffrey Maehl	13	8	6	14	1.0–1	–	–	–	–	–	–	–	–	–
Marvin Johnson	12	2	6	8	–	–	–	–	–	–	–	–	–	–
Talmadge Jackson III	13	4	2	6	–	–	–	–	–	–	–	–	–	–
Kenny Rowe	13	4	1	5	4.0–28	3.0–22	–	–	–	–	–	1	–	–
Ryan DePalo	8	1	3	4	–	–	–	–	–	–	–	–	–	–
Brandon Bair	13	3	1	4	1.0–5	–	–	–	–	2	1–0	–	–	–
Spencer Paysinger	13	1	1	2	2	–	–	–	–	–	–	–	–	–
Michael Speed	10	1	1	2	–	–	–	–	–	–	–	–	–	–
Jeremiah Johnson	6	3	1	4	–	–	–	–	–	–	–	–	–	–
Matt Larkin	12	1	–	1	–	–	–	–	–	–	–	–	–	–
Andre Crenshaw	13	2	1	3	–	–	–	–	–	–	–	1	–	–
Ed Dickson	13	2	1	3	–	–	–	–	–	–	–	1	–	–
Erik Elshire	6	1	–	1	–	–	–	–	–	–	–	–	–	–
Matt Evensen	13	2	–	2	–	–	–	–	–	–	–	–	–	–
Eric Steimer	12	1	–	1	–	–	–	–	–	–	–	–	–	–
Riley Showalter	7	1	1	2	–	–	–	–	–	–	–	–	–	–
Josh Tschirgi	12	1	–	1	–	–	–	–	–	–	–	–	–	–
Mark Lewis	12	1	–	1	–	–	–	–	–	–	–	–	–	–
Remene Alston	7	1	–	1	–	–	–	–	–	–	–	–	–	–
Chad Peppars	4	–	1	1	–	–	–	–	–	–	–	–	–	–
Jordan Holmes	8	1	–	1	–	–	–	–	–	–	–	–	–	–
Simi Toeania	2	1	–	1	–	–	–	–	–	–	–	–	–	–
Anthony Gildon	6	–	–	–	–	–	–	1	1	–	–	–	–	–
Chris Barber	0	–	–	–	–	–	–	–	–	–	–	–	–	
Jonathan Stewart	13	1	–	1	–	–	–	–	–	–	–	–	–	–
Michel DiVincenzo	5	–	–	–	–	–	–	1	1	–	–	–	–	–
Team	11	–	–	–	–	–	–	–	–	–	–	–	–	1
Total	13	435	308	743	93–345	30–214	13–231	45	58	29	10–25	8	3	1

=== Special teams ===
Name	Punting									Kickoffs				
Name	No.	Yds	Avg	Long	TB	FC	I20	50+	Blkd	No.	Yds	Avg	TB	OB
Josh Syria	71	2,962	41.7	61	5	11	26	10	0					
Matt Evensen	1	17	17.0	17	0	0	1	0	0	87	5,591	64.3	17	5
Luke Bellotti										3	120	40.0	0	0
Morgan Flint										2	96	48.0	0	0
Jeffery Maehl										1	65	65.0	0	0
Total	72	2,979	41.4	61	5	11	27	10	0	93	5,872	63.1	17	5

Name	Punt returns					Kick returns				
Name	No.	Yds	Avg	TD	Long	No.	Yds	Avg	TD	Long
Andiel Brown	17	177	10.4	0	64	3	63	21.0	0	26
Aaron Pflugrad	8	29	3.6	0	9	1	22	22.0	0	22
Jairus Byrd	7	63	9.0	0	26					
Patrick Chung	2	10	5.0	0	0	9	201	22.3	0	40
Garren Strong	1	0	0.0	0	0					
Derrick Jones	1	0	0.0	0	0	6	137	22.8	0	41
Malachi Lewis	0	8	0.0	0	8					
Chris Barber	0	0	0	0	0	0	0	0		
Jonathan Stewart						23	614	26.7	0	64
Andre Crenshaw						6	122	20.3	0	35
Walter Thurmond III						3	66	22.0	0	28
Remene Alston						2	45	22.5	0	28
Aaron Pflugrad						1	22	22.0	0	22
Total	36	287	8.0	0	64	50	1,181	23.6	0	64
