= 2007 Sun Bowl =

American college football game

2007 Brut Sun Bowl
- 74th Sun Bowl
- Sun Bowl Logo
| South Florida Bulls | Oregon Ducks |
| (9–3) | (8–4) |
| Big East | Pac-10 |
| 21 | 56 |
| Head coach: Jim Leavitt | Head coach: Mike Bellotti |
| AP / Coaches / BCS; 23 / 25 / 21 |
| | 1 | 2 | 3 | 4 | Total |
|---|---|---|---|---|---|
| South Florida | 0 | 14 | 0 | 7 | 21 |
| Oregon | 8 | 10 | 28 | 10 | 56 |
- Date: December 31, 2007
- Season: 2007
- Stadium: Sun Bowl
- Location: El Paso, Texas
- MVP: RB Jonathan Stewart, Oregon
- Favorite: Oregon by 6½
- Referee: Bill Alge (MAC)
- Halftime show: Baby Bash, Paula DeAnda, Bands from participants
- Attendance: 49,867
- Payout: US$1.9 million per team

United States TV coverage
- Network: CBS
- Announcers: Craig Bolerjack, Steve Beuerlein, and Sam Ryan

The 2007 Brut Sun Bowl, part of the 2007-08 NCAA football bowl games season, was played on December 31, 2007, at Sun Bowl Stadium on the campus of the University of Texas, El Paso, between the South Florida Bulls and the Oregon Ducks.

The Ducks were playing without quarterback Dennis Dixon, who finished fifth in the Heisman Trophy balloting but who had season-ending ACL surgery in November. Redshirt freshman Justin Roper made his first collegiate start in place of Dixon and threw for four touchdowns to tie a Sun Bowl record and lead the Ducks to a 56–21 victory.

The game marked the 40th consecutive telecast by CBS Sports. No other network and bowl game has been paired for a longer period of time.
