= Dennis Dixon =

American football player (born 1985)

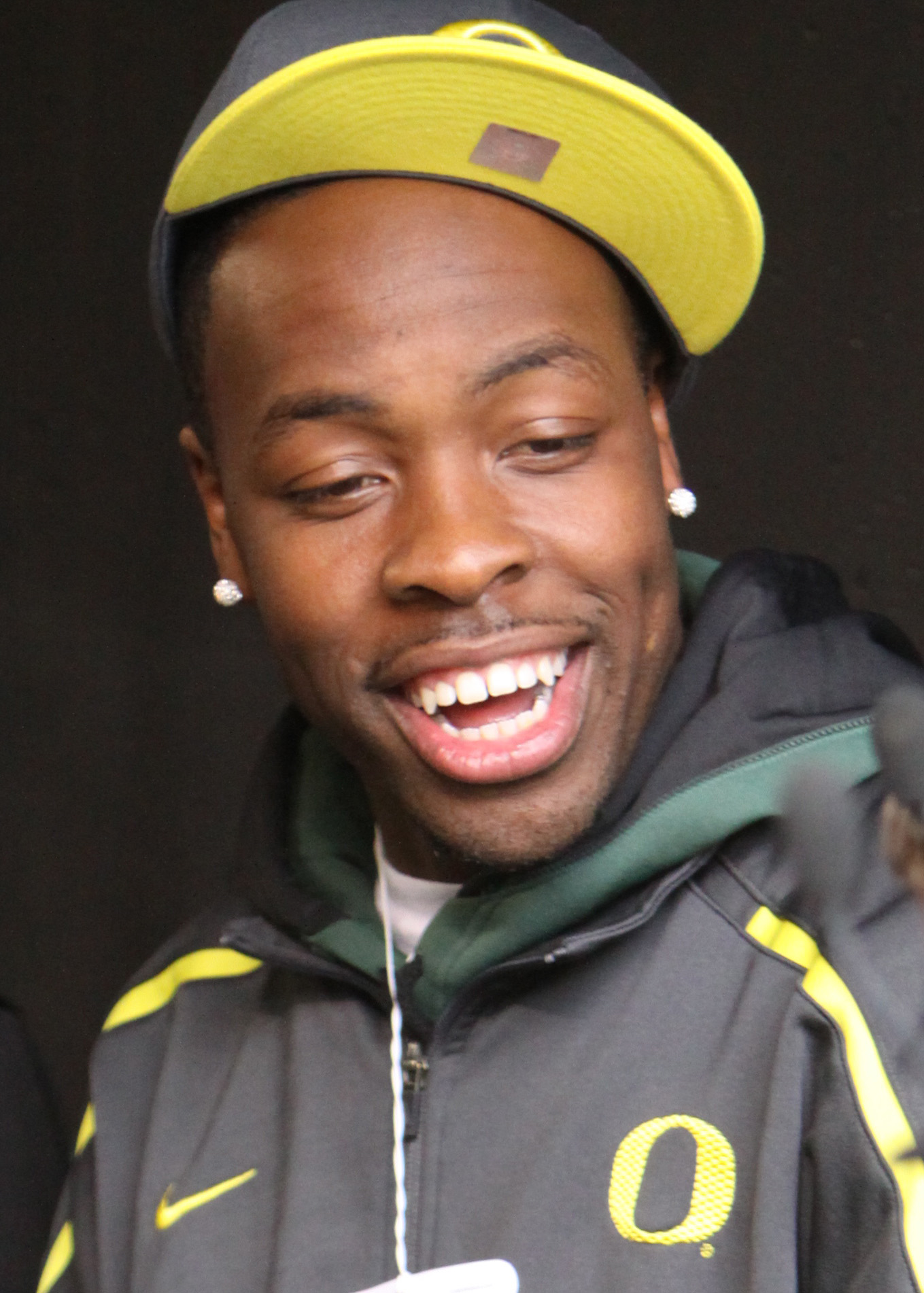
- Dixon at Autzen Stadium in 2009

No. 2, 10
- Position: Quarterback

Personal information
- Born: January 11, 1985 (age 41); Oakland, California, U.S.
- Listed height: 6 ft 3 in (1.91 m)
- Listed weight: 215 lb (98 kg)

Career information
- High school: San Leandro (San Leandro, California)
- College: Oregon
- NFL draft: 2008: 5th round, 156th overall pick

Career history
- Pittsburgh Steelers (2008–2011); Baltimore Ravens (2012)*; Philadelphia Eagles (2013)*; Buffalo Bills (2013–2014)*; Arizona Cardinals (2014)*
- * Offseason or practice squad member only

Awards and highlights
- 2× Super Bowl champion (XLIII, XLVII); Pac-10 Offensive Player of the Year (2007); First-team All-Pac-10 (2007)

Career NFL statistics
- Passing attempts: 59
- Passing completions: 35
- Completion percentage: 59.3%
- TD–INT: 1–2
- Passing yards: 402
- Passer rating: 71.4
- Rushing yards: 56
- Rushing touchdowns: 1
- Stats at Pro Football Reference

Dennis Lee Dixon Jr. (born January 11, 1985) is an American former professional football player who was a quarterback in the National Football League (NFL). He played college football for the Oregon Ducks. Dixon was selected by the Pittsburgh Steelers in the fifth round of the 2008 NFL draft and played with the team through 2011. He was a member of the Baltimore Ravens practice squad during the 2012 season in which they won a Super Bowl.

== Early life ==
Dixon was the starting quarterback for San Leandro High School's football team beginning his sophomore year. In his senior season, Dixon threw for 2,426 yards and 30 touchdowns, leading his team to a 12–1 season in 2002. Dixon completed his high school career with 5,951 yards and 79 touchdowns, guiding San Leandro to a 36–3 record, with his only losses coming in three straight California North Coast Section 4A championship games to perennial powerhouse De La Salle.

Dixon was a consensus four-star recruit, and was ranked among the top passing and rushing quarterbacks in the nation. He eventually decided to attend the University of Oregon, stating that "I am going to Oregon with only one purpose, and that is to win a national championship".

Dixon was also a highly recruited baseball player, and was initially drafted by the Cincinnati Reds in the 20th round of the 2003 Major League Baseball draft. However, he did not sign because he wanted to go to college and get a degree.

== College career ==
Dixon opted to grayshirt (attend school part-time and retain eligibility) for the 2003 season and played his freshman season in 2004 behind Kellen Clemens. He appeared in six games, passing for 73 and rushing for 40 yards. In his sophomore season of 2005, he was expected to play primarily in a backup role during Clemens's senior season. However, against Arizona, Clemens broke his ankle, and Dixon came into the game, though he later left with a concussion. With Clemens out for the season, Dixon split time with fellow sophomore quarterback Brady Leaf and guided the Ducks to four regular season wins and a second-place finish in the Pac-10, before dropping a 17–14 loss in the Holiday Bowl against Oklahoma.

Prior to his junior season in 2006, Dixon was named full-time starter by head coach Mike Bellotti. He led the Ducks to a 4–0 start, including a 34–33 comeback victory over the Oklahoma Sooners. After a win over Arizona State, the Ducks lost 48–24 to Cal before Dixon's hometown crowd. After being benched in favor of Brady Leaf, Oregon went on to lose three of their four final games and finished with a 7–6 record. Despite his shortened season, Dixon still finished the season fourth in the conference in total offense (219.3 yards per game). Dixon was named the league's second-team academic all-conference quarterback. In June 2007, he graduated from Oregon with a degree in sociology and a 3.27 grade point average.

In 2007, Bellotti again named Dixon, now a senior, the starter prior to the season. The season started off quickly for Dixon against Houston, in which Dixon accumulated 141 yards rushing, the most ever by an Oregon quarterback. The following week against Michigan, Dixon threw for 3 touchdowns and ran for another, generating 368 yards of total offense. Dixon was named Pac-10 Offensive Player of the Week and USA Today National Player of the Week.

In the next two games, he led the Ducks to big wins over Fresno State (where he threw for two touchdowns and ran for another), and Stanford (where he completed 27 of 36 passes for 367 yards and 4 touchdowns and ran for another).

Against Cal, Dixon threw his first two interceptions of the season, but led the Ducks down the field in the final minute for a potential tying score before Cameron Colvin fumbled the ball through the end zone in the final seconds for Oregon's first loss of the season.

Wins in the following weeks over Pac-10 powers USC and Arizona State pushed Oregon to a #2 ranking in the BCS poll and first place in the Pac-10. During the Arizona State game, he left the game with a knee injury, but was cleared to play two weeks later against Arizona. In the first quarter of that game, he ran 39 yards for a touchdown, but a few plays later, his left knee buckled and he left the game because of the injury, and the Ducks went on to lose 34–24. It was then revealed that Dixon had torn the ACL in his left knee against Arizona State and aggravated it against Arizona. In the last game of the season against archrival Oregon State, they lost and the Beavers broke the streak of the last 10 years in which the home team had always won. Without Dixon, and following an injury to backup Brady Leaf as well as a long list of injuries to the entire Duck team, the Ducks lost the last two games of the season, but went on to defeat South Florida 56–21 in the 2007 Sun Bowl as Dixon watched from the sideline and continued to cheer on his team.

After undergoing surgery to repair his torn ACL, Dixon walked with no apparent limp at the NFL Combine headquarters in Indianapolis in February. Dixon was unable to perform any Combine drills, but worked out at Oregon's Pro Day and held impressive individual workouts later.

== Baseball career ==
Following his junior year at Oregon, Dixon was picked by the Atlanta Braves in the fifth round of the 2007 Major League Baseball draft. Dixon hit .176 in 74 at bats with two Atlanta Braves rookie league teams, and returned to Oregon for his senior year during the 2007 season.

== Professional career ==
Pre-draft measurables
Height	Weight	Arm length	Hand span
6 ft 3 1/4 in (1.91 m)	195 lb (88 kg)	36 1/4 in (0.92 m)	9 3/4 in (0.25 m)
All values from NFL Combine

=== Pittsburgh Steelers ===
In the 2008 NFL draft, Dixon was taken in the fifth round with the 156th overall pick by the Pittsburgh Steelers. It was speculated that he could be used in the manner that the Steelers used Antwaan Randle El, who was a college quarterback that turned into an NFL wide receiver.

Dixon passed for a combined 12-for-24 in passing attempts in two 2008 preseason games, in addition, he ran for a 47-yard touchdown against the Buffalo Bills. On December 28, 2008, Dixon completed his first official NFL pass to Hines Ward, of which the reception was Ward's 800th of his career.

Dixon made his first career start on November 29, 2009, against the Baltimore Ravens after injuries suffered by Roethlisberger and Charlie Batch a week earlier moved him up the depth chart. In the game, the Steelers went on to lose 20–17 in overtime. Dixon finished 12-of-26 for 145 yards with one touchdown and one interception. In addition, he ran for 27 yards on three carries, including one run for a touchdown. However, his one interception was in the overtime period, allowing the Baltimore Ravens to kick a field goal for the winning score.

Dixon wore the #2 during his first two seasons with the Steelers, but after the trade of Santonio Holmes, Dixon took #10, his college number.

With Roethlisberger being suspended for four games to start the 2010 season, Byron Leftwich was named the Steelers' starter. Even though Dixon threw two interceptions in his only preseason start, a serious knee injury to Leftwich during the preseason finale led to Dixon being named the opening day starter. After winning against the Atlanta Falcons in Week 1, Dixon tore his meniscus while playing against the Tennessee Titans the following week in what would be the final game of his career. He was put on Injured Reserve on October 13.

=== Baltimore Ravens ===
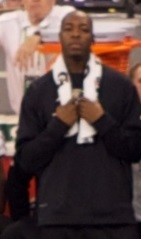
Dixon on the sideline during Super Bowl XLVII.

On September 2, 2012, the Baltimore Ravens signed Dixon to their practice squad. He was cut from the squad November 7, 2012, and was re-signed to the practice squad again on November 13, 2012. He was the practice squad quarterback when the Ravens won Super Bowl XLVII and earned a ring.

=== Philadelphia Eagles ===
Dixon signed a two-year contract with the Philadelphia Eagles on February 14, 2013. The move reunited him with new head coach Chip Kelly, who was the offensive coordinator at Oregon during Dixon's senior year in 2007. Dixon was released during final cuts on August 30.

=== Buffalo Bills ===
On October 8, 2013, Dixon was signed to the Buffalo Bills practice squad, following an injury to starting quarterback EJ Manuel. The Bills released him on August 25, 2014.

=== Arizona Cardinals ===
On October 7, 2014, Dixon was signed to the Arizona Cardinals practice squad. He was released by the team on October 13, 2014.

== Career statistics ==
=== NFL ===
==== Regular season ====
Year	Team	Games			Passing								Rushing				Sacks		Fumbles (Note: Fumbles lost data taken from Pro Football Reference career game log)	
Year	Team	GP	GS	Record	Cmp	Att	Pct	Yds	Y/A	TD	Int	Rtg	Att	Yds	Avg	TD	Sck	SckY	Fum	Lost
2008	PIT	1	0	–	1	1	100.0	3	3.0	0	0	79.2	2	-3	-1.5	0	0	0	0	0
2009	PIT	1	1	0–1	12	26	46.2	145	5.6	1	1	60.6	3	27	9.0	1	0	0	0	0
2010	PIT	2	2	2–0	22	32	68.8	254	7.9	0	1	79.4	5	32	6.4	0	5	41	2	1
2011	PIT	0	0	DNP																
Career		4	3	2–1	35	59	59.3	402	6.8	1	2	71.4	10	56	5.6	1	5	41	2	1

==== Playoffs ====
Year	Team	Games			Passing								Rushing				Sacks		Fumbles	
Year	Team	GP	GS	Record	Cmp	Att	Pct	Yds	Y/A	TD	Int	Rtg	Att	Yds	Avg	TD	Sck	SckY	Fum	Lost
2008	PIT	0	0	DNP																
2010	PIT	0	0	DNP																
2011	PIT	0	0	DNP																

=== College ===
Year	Team	Games			Passing								Rushing			
Year	Team	GP	GS	Record	Cmp	Att	Pct	Yds	Y/A	TD	Int	Rtg	Att	Yds	Avg	TD
2004	Oregon	6	0	—	6	15	40.0	73	4.9	0	0	80.9	10	40	4.0	0
2005	Oregon	12	4	3–1	69	104	66.3	777	7.5	6	3	142.4	49	143	2.9	1
2006	Oregon	12	11	7–4	197	322	61.2	2,143	6.7	12	14	120.7	94	442	4.7	2
2007	Oregon	10	10	8–2	172	254	67.7	2,136	8.4	20	4	161.2	105	583	5.6	9
Career		40	25	18–7	444	695	63.9	5,129	7.4	38	21	137.9	258	1,208	4.7	12

== Awards and honors ==
NFL

- 2× Super Bowl champion (XLIII, XLVII)

College

- 2007 Pacific-10 Conference Offensive Player of the Year
- 2007 first-team All-Pac-10
- Received 17 first-place votes for the Heisman Trophy and finished fifth in the overall voting, while being the frontrunner in votes prior to the Arizona game.
- Finalist for the Draddy Trophy, Davey O'Brien National Quarterback Award, Johnny Unitas Golden Arm Award, Maxwell Award, and the Walter Camp Award.
- Winner of NCAA's Today's Top VIII Award.
- Hayward award, given to the state of Oregon's best amateur athlete.
