= 2007 NCAA Division I FBS football season =

American college football season

2007 NCAA Division I FBS season
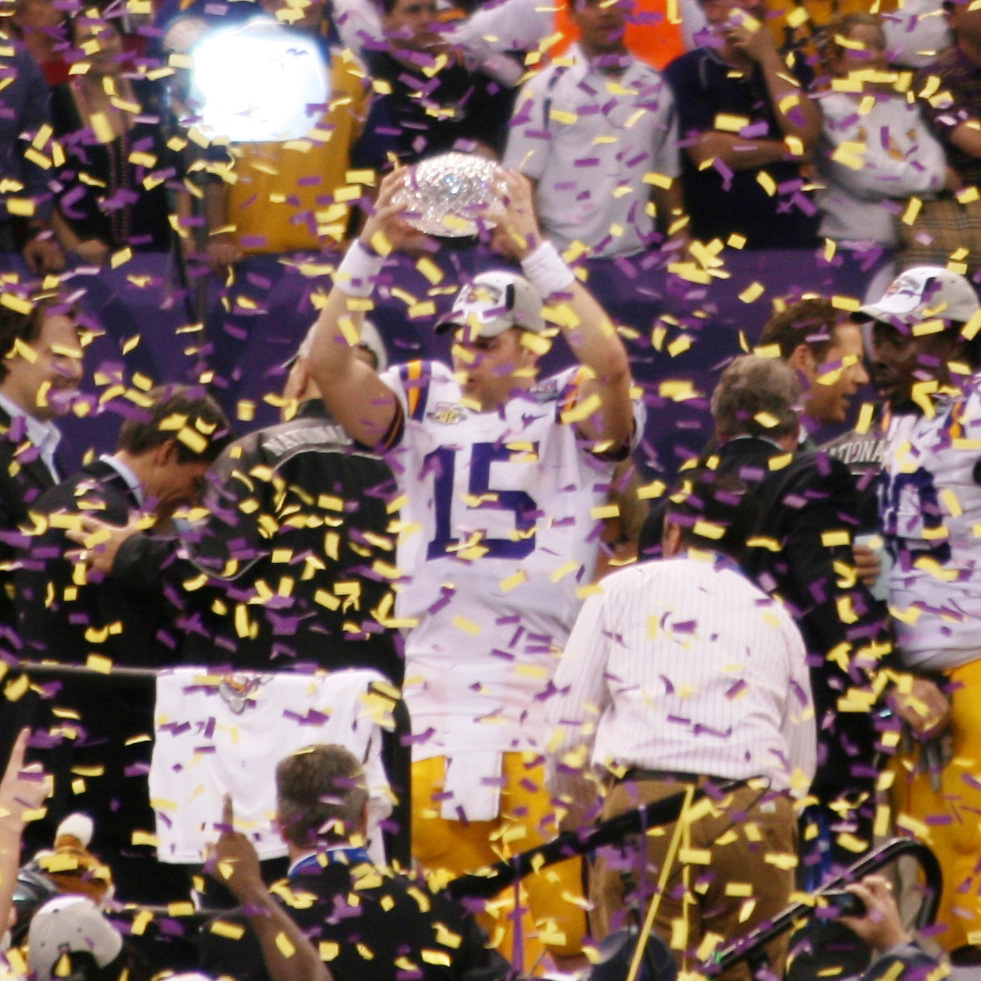
- LSU's quarterback Matt Flynn lifting the AFCA National Championship Trophy after the BCS title game
- Number of teams: 120
- Duration: August 30 – December 1
- Preseason AP No. 1: USC

Postseason
- Duration: December 20, 2007 – January 7, 2008
- Bowl games: 32
- Heisman Trophy: Tim Tebow (quarterback, Florida)

Bowl Championship Series
- 2008 BCS Championship Game
- Site: Louisiana Superdome, New Orleans, Louisiana
- Champion(s): LSU

NCAA Division I FBS football seasons
- ← 2006 2008 →

The 2007 NCAA Division I FBS football season was the highest level of college football competition in the United States organized by the National Collegiate Athletic Association (NCAA).

The regular season began on August 30, 2007, and ended on December 1, 2007. The postseason concluded on January 7, 2008, with the BCS National Championship Game in New Orleans, where the No. 2-ranked Louisiana State Tigers defeated the No. 1 Ohio State Buckeyes to win their 2nd BCS and 3rd overall national title.

For just the second time in the Bowl Championship Series era, no FBS team finished the season undefeated. Kansas was the only team from a BCS automatic-qualifying conference to finish the entire season with just one loss.

== Rules changes ==
After coaches expressed their disapproval of the timing changes made in the 2006 season, the following changes were made:

- On kickoffs, the clock will not start until the ball is touched in the field of play.
- On change of possession, the clock will not start until the snap.

The attempt to reduce the time of games sought by those rules was successful, reducing the average college football page from 3:21 hours in 2005 to 3:07 hours in 2006. However, the reduced game time also reduced the average number of plays in a game by 13, 66 fewer offensive yards per game and average points per game by 5.

Other rules changes for the 2007 season include:

- Moving the kick-off yard-line from 35 to 30, which matches the yard-line used in the National Football League from 1994 to 2010, to reduce the number of touchbacks.
- Paring the 25-second play clock to 15 seconds after TV timeouts.
- Team time-outs for televised games are shortened from 60 seconds to 30 seconds.
- Allowing penalties against the kicking team on kickoffs to be assessed at the end of the runback, avoiding a re-kick, also matching the NFL rule.
- Once the umpire gives the ball to the kicker, the 25 second play clock starts.
- Kickoffs out of bounds are now penalized 35 yards from the spot of the kick or a re-kick with a five-yard penalty.
- Defenders cannot use any part of a teammate to jump over an opponent to block a kick.

== Conference and program changes ==
The only change in conference membership for the 2007 season occurred when Temple left its Independent status to become the 13th member of the Mid-American Conference.

One team upgraded from Division I FCS, increasing the number of Division I FBS schools to 120.

School	2006 Conference	2007 Conference
Temple Owls	I-A Independent	MAC
Western Kentucky Hilltoppers	MVC	I-A Independent

== Regular season top 10 matchups ==
Rankings reflect the AP Poll. Rankings for Week 7 and beyond will list BCS Rankings first and AP Poll second. Teams that failed to be a top 10 team for one poll or the other will be noted.

- Week 2
  - No. 2 LSU defeated No. 9 Virginia Tech, 48–7 (Tiger Stadium, Baton Rouge, Louisiana)
- Week 6
  - No. 1 LSU defeated No. 9 Florida, 28–24 (Tiger Stadium, Baton Rouge, Louisiana)
- Week 9
  - No. 2/2 Boston College defeated No. 8/8 Virginia Tech, 14–10 (Lane Stadium, Blacksburg, Virginia)
  - No. 5/5 Oregon defeated No. 12/9 USC, 24–17 (Autzen Stadium, Eugene, Oregon)
- Week 10
  - No. 5/4 Oregon defeated No. 4/6 Arizona State, 35–23 (Autzen Stadium, Eugene, Oregon)
- Week 13
  - No. 4/3 Missouri defeated No. 2/2 Kansas, 36–28 (Arrowhead Stadium, Kansas City, Missouri)
- Week 14
  - No. 9/9 Oklahoma defeated No. 1/1 Missouri, 38–17 (2007 Big 12 Championship Game, Alamodome, San Antonio, Texas)

== Year of the Upset and "The Curse of No. 2" ==
=== Year of the Upset ===
The 2007 season was highlighted by the remarkable frequency with which ranked teams fell to lower-ranked or unranked opponents, leading the media to dub the season as the "Year of the Upset". An unranked or lower-ranked opponent defeated a higher-ranked team 59 times over the course of the regular season. Teams ranked in the top five of the AP Poll were defeated by unranked opponents 13 times during the regular season, setting a new record in the history of the AP Poll when at least 20 teams were ranked. The only other season to see more such upsets was 1967, which was one of seven seasons when the AP Poll ranked only 10 teams.

The chaos began on the first weekend of the season when FCS program Appalachian State defeated No. 5 Michigan on the road at Michigan Stadium in what was immediately hailed as one of the greatest upsets in the history of college football. Appalachian State became just the second FCS team to defeat a ranked FBS opponent, and the first to do so against a top-five team.

=== "Curse of the No. 2" ===
The 2007 season became known for the "Curse of the No. 2", where the team ranked No. 2 by the AP Poll was defeated seven times in the final nine weeks of the regular season:

- Stanford defeated No. 2 USC, 24–23, on October 6 at Los Angeles Memorial Coliseum. This result was particularly notable for the fact that USC was favored to win the game by 41 points, having carried winning streaks of 35 games at home and 24 games in Pac-10 play into the matchup. Both streaks ended with this loss.
- Oregon State defeated No. 2 California, 31–28, on October 13 at California Memorial Stadium.
- Rutgers defeated No. 2 South Florida, 30–27, on October 18 at Rutgers Stadium.
- Florida State defeated No. 2 Boston College, 27–17, on November 3 at Alumni Stadium.
- Arizona defeated No. 2 Oregon, 34–24, on November 15 at Arizona Stadium.
- No. 4 Missouri defeated No. 2 Kansas, 36–28, on November 24 at Arrowhead Stadium in a Border War rivalry game. This was the only such upset where the winning team was also ranked.
- Pittsburgh defeated No. 2 West Virginia, 13–9, on December 1 at Mountaineer Field in a Backyard Brawl rivalry game. West Virginia was knocked out of contention for the BCS National Championship on the final weekend of the regular season.

The No. 1 and No. 2 ranked teams had not lost in the same week of the season since 1996. In 2007 alone, No. 1 and No. 2 fell during the same weekend three times, including in both of the final two weeks of the regular season:

- No. 1 LSU lost to Kentucky 43–37 in three overtimes, and No. 2 California lost to Oregon State 31–28 on October 13.
- No. 1 LSU lost to Arkansas 50–48 in three overtimes on November 23, and No. 2 Kansas lost to No. 4 Missouri 36–28 on November 24.
- No. 1 Missouri lost to No. 9 Oklahoma 38–17 in the Big 12 Championship Game, and No. 2 West Virginia lost to Pittsburgh 13–9 on December 1.

== Conference standings ==
2007 Atlantic Coast Conference football standings
	Conf.			Overall
Team	W		L	W		L
Atlantic Division
No. 10 Boston College x	6	–	2	11	–	3
No. 21 Clemson	5	–	3	9	–	4
Wake Forest	5	–	3	9	–	4
Florida State	4	–	4	7	–	6
Maryland	3	–	5	6	–	7
NC State	3	–	5	5	–	7
Coastal Division
No. 9 Virginia Tech x$	7	–	1	11	–	3
Virginia	6	–	2	9	–	4
Georgia Tech	4	–	4	7	–	6
North Carolina	3	–	5	4	–	8
Miami (FL)	2	–	6	5	–	7
Duke	0	–	8	1	–	11
Championship: Virginia Tech 30, Boston College 16
$ – BCS representative as conference champion; % – BCS at-large representative; x – Division champion/co-champions; Rankings from AP Poll

2007 Big 12 Conference football standings
	Conf.			Overall
Team	W		L	W		L
North Division
No. 4 Missouri xy	7	–	1	12	–	2
No. 7 Kansas x%	7	–	1	12	–	1
Colorado	4	–	4	6	–	7
Kansas State	3	–	5	5	–	7
Nebraska	2	–	6	5	–	7
Iowa State	2	–	6	3	–	9
South Division
No. 8 Oklahoma xy$	6	–	2	11	–	3
No. 10 Texas	5	–	3	10	–	3
No. 22 Texas Tech	4	–	4	9	–	4
Oklahoma State	4	–	4	7	–	6
Texas A&M	4	–	4	7	–	6
Baylor	0	–	8	3	–	9
Championship: Oklahoma 38, Missouri 17
$ – BCS representative as conference champion; % – BCS at-large representative; x – Division champion/co-champions; y – Championship game participant; Rankings from AP Poll

2007 Big East Conference football standings
	Conf.			Overall
Team	W		L	W		L
No. 6 West Virginia $+	5	–	2	11	–	2
Connecticut +	5	–	2	9	–	4
No. 17 Cincinnati	4	–	3	10	–	3
South Florida	4	–	3	9	–	4
Rutgers	3	–	4	8	–	5
Louisville	3	–	4	6	–	6
Pittsburgh	3	–	4	5	–	7
Syracuse	1	–	6	2	–	10
$ – BCS representative as conference champion; + – Conference co-champions; Rankings from AP Poll

2007 Big Ten Conference football standings
	Conf.			Overall
Team	W		L	W		L
No. 5 Ohio State $	7	–	1	11	–	2
No. 18 Michigan	6	–	2	9	–	4
No. 20 Illinois %	6	–	2	9	–	4
No. 24 Wisconsin	5	–	3	9	–	4
Penn State	4	–	4	9	–	4
Iowa	4	–	4	6	–	6
Purdue	3	–	5	8	–	5
Indiana	3	–	5	7	–	6
Michigan State	3	–	5	7	–	6
Northwestern	3	–	5	6	–	6
Minnesota	0	–	8	1	–	11
$ – BCS representative as conference champion; % – BCS at-large representative; Rankings from AP Poll

2007 Conference USA football standings
	Conf.			Overall
Team	W		L	W		L
East Division
UCF x$	7	–	1	10	–	4
East Carolina	6	–	2	8	–	5
Memphis	6	–	2	7	–	6
Southern Miss	5	–	3	7	–	6
Marshall	3	–	5	3	–	9
UAB	1	–	7	2	–	10
West Division
Tulsa xy	6	–	2	10	–	4
Houston x	6	–	2	8	–	5
Tulane	3	–	5	4	–	8
Rice	3	–	5	3	–	9
UTEP	2	–	6	4	–	8
SMU	0	–	8	1	–	11
Championship: UCF 44, Tulsa 25
$ – Conference champion; x – Division champion/co-champions; y – Championship game participant; Rankings from AP Poll

2007 Mid-American Conference football standings
	Div			Conf.			Overall
Team	W		L	W		L	W		L
East Division
Miami (OH) xy	4	–	2	5	–	2	6	–	7
Bowling Green x	4	–	2	6	–	2	8	–	5
Buffalo x	4	–	2	5	–	3	5	–	7
Ohio	3	–	3	4	–	4	6	–	6
Temple	3	–	3	4	–	4	4	–	8
Akron	2	–	4	3	–	5	4	–	8
Kent State	1	–	5	1	–	7	3	–	9
West Division
Central Michigan xy$	4	–	1	6	–	1	8	–	6
Ball State x	4	–	1	5	–	2	7	–	6
Eastern Michigan	3	–	2	3	–	4	4	–	8
Western Michigan	2	–	3	3	–	4	5	–	7
Toledo	2	–	3	3	–	5	5	–	7
Northern Illinois	0	–	5	1	–	6	2	–	10
Championship: Central Michigan 35, Miami 10
$ – Conference champion; x – Division champion/co-champions; Due to an unbalanced conference schedule, the team with best division record within each division was awarded that division's championship game berth.

2007 Mountain West Conference football standings
	Conf.			Overall
Team	W		L	W		L
No. 14 BYU $	8	–	0	11	–	2
Air Force	6	–	2	9	–	4
New Mexico	5	–	3	9	–	4
Utah	5	–	3	9	–	4
TCU	4	–	4	8	–	5
San Diego State	3	–	5	4	–	8
Wyoming	2	–	6	5	–	7
Colorado State	2	–	6	3	–	9
UNLV	1	–	7	2	–	10
$ – Conference champion; Rankings from AP Poll

2007 Pacific-10 Conference football standings
	Conf.			Overall
Team	W		L	W		L
No. 3 USC +	7	–	2	11	–	2
No. 16 Arizona State +	7	–	2	10	–	3
No. 25 Oregon State	6	–	3	9	–	4
No. 23 Oregon	5	–	4	9	–	4
UCLA	5	–	4	6	–	7
Arizona	4	–	5	5	–	7
California	3	–	6	7	–	6
Washington State	3	–	6	5	–	7
Stanford	3	–	6	4	–	8
Washington	2	–	7	4	–	9
+ – Conference co-champions; Rankings from AP Poll

2007 Southeastern Conference football standings
	Conf.			Overall
Team	W		L	W		L
Eastern Division
No. 12 Tennessee xy	6	–	2	10	–	4
No. 2 Georgia x%	6	–	2	11	–	2
No. 13 Florida	5	–	3	9	–	4
South Carolina	3	–	5	6	–	6
Kentucky	3	–	5	8	–	5
Vanderbilt	2	–	6	5	–	7
Western Division
No. 1 LSU x$#	6	–	2	12	–	2
No. 15 Auburn	5	–	3	9	–	4
Arkansas	4	–	4	8	–	5
Mississippi State	4	–	4	8	–	5
Alabama	4	–	4	7	–	6
Ole Miss	0	–	8	3	–	9
Championship: LSU 21, Tennessee 14
# – BCS National Champion; $ – BCS representative as conference champion; % – BCS at-large representative; x – Division champion/co-champions; y – Championship game participant; Alabama had 5 victories vacated by the NCAA in 2010. As such, the official record for Alabama is 2–6 (1–4).; Rankings from AP Poll

2007 Sun Belt Conference football standings
	Conf.			Overall
Team	W		L	W		L
Florida Atlantic +	6	–	1	8	–	5
Troy +	6	–	1	8	–	4
Middle Tennessee	4	–	3	5	–	7
Louisiana–Monroe	4	–	3	6	–	6
Arkansas State	3	–	4	5	–	7
Louisiana–Lafayette	3	–	4	3	–	9
FIU	1	–	6	1	–	11
North Texas	1	–	6	2	–	10
+ – Conference co-champions

2007 Western Athletic Conference football standings
	Conf.			Overall
Team	W		L	W		L
No. 19 Hawaii $	8	–	0	12	–	1
Boise State	7	–	1	10	–	3
Fresno State	6	–	2	9	–	4
Nevada	4	–	4	6	–	7
Louisiana Tech	4	–	4	5	–	7
San Jose State	4	–	4	5	–	7
Utah State	2	–	6	2	–	10
New Mexico State	1	–	7	4	–	9
Idaho	0	–	8	1	–	11
$ – Conference champion and BCS representative as top non-AQ school to meet automatic qualification criteria; Rankings from AP Poll

2007 NCAA Division I FBS independents football records
	Conf.			Overall
Team	W		L	W		L
Navy		–		8	–	5
Army		–		3	–	9
Notre Dame		–		3	–	9
Rankings from AP Poll

== FCS team wins over FBS teams ==
Italics denotes FCS teams.

Date	Visiting team	Home team	Site	Result	Attendance	Ref.
September 1	No. 1 (FCS) Appalachian State	No. 5 (FBS) Michigan	Michigan Stadium • Ann Arbor, Michigan	34–32	109,218	
September 1	Nicholls State	Rice	Rice Stadium • Houston, Texas	16–14	11,859	
September 8	No. 7 (FCS) Northern Iowa	Iowa State	Jack Trice Stadium • Ames, Iowa	24–13	56,795	
September 8	No. 11 (FCS) Southern Illinois	Northern Illinois	Huskie Stadium • DeKalb, Illinois	34–31	24,182	
September 15	No. 8 (FCS) McNeese State	Louisiana–Lafayette	Cajun Field • Lafayette, Louisiana (Cajun Crown)	38–17	33,828	
September 15	No. 12 (FCS) New Hampshire	Marshall	Joan C. Edwards Stadium • Huntington, West Virginia	48–35	27,255	
September 22	No. 5 (FCS) North Dakota State	Central Michigan	Kelly/Shorts Stadium • Mount Pleasant, Michigan	44–14	16,522	
October 20	No. 2 (FCS) North Dakota State	Minnesota	Hubert H. Humphrey Metrodome • Minneapolis, Minnesota	27–21	63,088	
October 27	No. 9 (FCS) Delaware	Navy	Navy–Marine Corps Memorial Stadium • Annapolis, Maryland	59–52	35,213	
^{#}Rankings from AP Poll released prior to game.

== Conference champions ==
=== Conference championship games ===
All games were played on December 1, 2007. Rankings reflect the Week 14 AP Poll before the games were played.

Conference	Champion	Runner-up	Score	Site
ACC	No. 6 Virginia Tech	No. 12 Boston College	30–16	Jacksonville Municipal Stadium Jacksonville, Florida
Big 12	No. 9 Oklahoma	No. 1 Missouri	38–17	Alamodome San Antonio, Texas
Conference USA	UCF	Tulsa	44–25	Bright House Networks Stadium Orlando, Florida
MAC	Central Michigan	Miami (Ohio)	35–10	Ford Field Detroit
SEC	No. 5 LSU	No. 14 Tennessee	21–14	Georgia Dome Atlanta

=== Other conference champions ===
Rankings are from the Week 15 AP Poll.

Conference	Winner(s)
Big East	Connecticut, No. 11 West Virginia*
Big Ten	No. 1 Ohio State
Mountain West	No. 19 BYU
Pac-10	No. 12 Arizona State, No. 6 USC*
Sun Belt	Florida Atlantic, Troy
WAC	No. 10 Hawaiʻi

* Received conference's automatic BCS bowl bid

== Bowl games ==
Winners are listed in boldface.

=== Bowl Championship Series ===
Bowl Game	Date	Playing as Visitor	Playing as Home	Score
BCS Title Game (New Orleans, Louisiana)	January 7, 2008	**No. 2 LSU**	No. 1 Ohio State	38–24
Rose Bowl (Pasadena, California)	January 1, 2008	No. 13 Illinois	**No. 6 USC**	49–17
Sugar Bowl (New Orleans)	January 1, 2008	No. 10 Hawaiʻi	**No. 4 Georgia**	41–10
Fiesta Bowl (Glendale, Arizona)	January 2, 2008	**No. 11 West Virginia**	No. 3 Oklahoma	48–28
Orange Bowl (Miami Gardens, Florida)	January 3, 2008	**No. 8 Kansas**	No. 5 Virginia Tech	24–21

=== January bowl games ===
Bowl Game	Date	Playing as Visitor	Playing as Home	Score
Outback Bowl (Tampa, Florida)	January 1, 2008	No. 18 Wisconsin	**No. 16 Tennessee**	21–17
Cotton Bowl (Dallas, Texas)	January 1, 2008	**No. 7 Missouri**	No. 25 Arkansas	38–7
Capital One Bowl (Orlando, Florida)	January 1, 2008	**Michigan**	No. 9 Florida	41–35
Gator Bowl (Jacksonville, Florida)	January 1, 2008	**Texas Tech**	No. 21 Virginia	31–28
International Bowl (Toronto, ON, Canada)	January 5, 2008	**Rutgers**	Ball State	52–30
GMAC Bowl (Mobile, Alabama)	January 6, 2008	Bowling Green	**Tulsa**	63–7

=== December bowl games ===
Bowl Game	Date	Playing as Visitor	Playing as Home	Score
Poinsettia Bowl (San Diego)	December 20, 2007	**Utah**	Navy	35–32
New Orleans Bowl (New Orleans)	December 21, 2007	Memphis	**Florida Atlantic**	44–27
PapaJohns.com Bowl (Birmingham, Alabama)	December 22, 2007	Southern Miss	**No. 20 Cincinnati**	31–21
New Mexico Bowl (Albuquerque, New Mexico)	December 22, 2007	Nevada	**New Mexico**	23–0
Las Vegas Bowl (Las Vegas)	December 22, 2007	UCLA	**No. 19 BYU**	17–16
Hawaiʻi Bowl (Honolulu)	December 23, 2007	No. 24 Boise State	**East Carolina**	41–38
Motor City Bowl (Detroit)	December 26, 2007	**Purdue**	Central Michigan	51–48
Holiday Bowl (San Diego)	December 27, 2007	No. 12 Arizona State	**No. 17 Texas**	52–34
Champs Sports Bowl (Orlando, Florida)	December 28, 2007	**No. 14 Boston College**	Michigan State	24–21
Texas Bowl (Houston)	December 28, 2007	**TCU**	Houston	20–13
Emerald Bowl (San Francisco)	December 28, 2007	Maryland	**Oregon State**	21–14
Meineke Car Care Bowl (Charlotte, North Carolina)	December 29, 2007	Connecticut	**Wake Forest**	24–10
Liberty Bowl (Memphis, Tennessee)	December 29, 2007	UCF	**Mississippi State**	10–3
Alamo Bowl (San Antonio)	December 29, 2007	**Penn State**	Texas A&M	24–17
Independence Bowl (Shreveport, Louisiana)	December 30, 2007	**Alabama**	Colorado	30–24
Armed Forces Bowl (Fort Worth, Texas)	December 31, 2007	**California**	Air Force	42–36
Sun Bowl (El Paso, Texas)	December 31, 2007	No. 23 South Florida	**Oregon**	56–21
Humanitarian Bowl (Boise, Idaho)	December 31, 2007	Georgia Tech	**Fresno State**	40–28
Music City Bowl (Nashville, Tennessee)	December 31, 2007	**Kentucky**	Florida State	35–28
Insight Bowl (Tempe, Arizona)	December 31, 2007	Indiana	**Oklahoma State**	49–33
Chick-fil-A Bowl (Atlanta)	December 31, 2007	No. 15 Clemson	**No. 22 Auburn**	23–20 (OT)

=== Postseason All-Star Games ===
- **Cornerstone Bancard Hula Bowl** – January 12, Aloha Stadium, ʻHalawa, Hawaiʻi – ʻAina (East) 38, Kai (West) 7.
- **East–West Shrine Game** – January 19, Robertson Stadium, Houston, Texas – West 31, East 17.
- **Under Armour Senior Bowl** – January 26, Ladd–Peebles Stadium, Mobile, Alabama – South 17, North 16.
- **Western Refining Texas vs. The Nation Game** – February 2, UTEP Sun Bowl Stadium, El Paso, Texas – Texas 41, The Nation 14

=== Bowl Challenge Cup standings ===
Bowl Challenge Cup
Conference	Wins	Losses	Percent
Mountain West†	4	1	.800
Southeastern§	7	2	.777
Pacific-10	4	2	.667
Big 12	5	3	.625
Big East	3	2	.600
Big Ten	3	5	.375
Conference USA	2	4	.333
Atlantic Coast	2	6	.250
Western Athletic	1	3	.250
Mid-American	0	3	.000

† Winner of the Bowl Challenge Cup – § NCAA record for bowl victories in a conference in one bowl season.

Notes

- The Sun Belt Conference, represented by Florida Atlantic University, was not eligible for the Bowl Challenge Cup as they only had one bowl berth. Conferences must have a minimum of three bids to be a part of the challenge.

== Awards and honors ==
=== Heisman Trophy voting ===
The Heisman Trophy is given to the year's most outstanding player

Player	School	Position	1st	2nd	3rd	Total
Tim Tebow	Florida	QB	462	229	113	1,957
Darren McFadden	Arkansas	RB	291	355	120	1,703
Colt Brennan	Hawaii	QB	54	114	242	632
Chase Daniel	Missouri	QB	25	84	182	425
Dennis Dixon	Oregon	QB	17	31	65	178
Pat White	West Virginia	QB	16	28	46	150
Matt Ryan	Boston College	QB	9	7	22	63
Kevin Smith	UCF	RB	3	11	24	55
Glenn Dorsey	LSU	DT	3	6	9	30
Chris Long	Virginia	DE	1	2	10	17

=== Other major award winners ===
- Walter Camp Award (top player): Darren McFadden, Arkansas
- Maxwell Award (top player): Tim Tebow, Florida
- Bronko Nagurski Trophy (defensive player): Glenn Dorsey, LSU
- Chuck Bednarik Award (defensive player): Dan Connor, Penn St
- Dave Rimington Trophy (center): Jonathan Luigs, Arkansas
- Davey O'Brien Award (quarterback): Tim Tebow, Florida
- Dick Butkus Award (linebacker): James Laurinaitis, Ohio State
- Doak Walker Award (running back): Darren McFadden, Arkansas
- Draddy Trophy ("academic Heisman"): Dallas Griffin, Texas
- Fred Biletnikoff Award (wide receiver): Michael Crabtree, Texas Tech
- Jim Thorpe Award (defensive back): Antoine Cason, Arizona
- John Mackey Award (tight end): Fred Davis, USC
- Johnny Unitas Award (senior quarterback): Matt Ryan, Boston College
- Lombardi Award (top lineman): Glenn Dorsey, LSU
- Lott Trophy (defensive impact): Glenn Dorsey, LSU
- Lou Groza Award (placekicker): Thomas Weber, Arizona St
- Manning Award (quarterback): Matt Ryan, Boston College
- Outland Trophy (interior lineman): Glenn Dorsey, LSU
- Ray Guy Award (punter): Durant Brooks, Georgia Tech
- Ted Hendricks Award (defensive end): Chris Long, Virginia
- Wuerffel Trophy (humanitarian-athlete): Paul Smith, Tulsa
- The Home Depot Coach of the Year Award: Mark Mangino, Kansas
- Associated Press Coach of the Year: Mark Mangino, Kansas
- Paul "Bear" Bryant Award (head coach): Mark Mangino, Kansas
- Walter Camp Coach of the Year (head coach): Mark Mangino, Kansas
- Broyles Award (assistant coach): Jim Heacock, Ohio State

=== All-America selections ===
Selections were made by the Associated Press.

==== Offense ====
- QB: Tim Tebow, So., Florida.
- RB: Darren McFadden Jr., Arkansas; Kevin Smith JR., Central Florida.
- WR: Michael Crabtree, Fr., Texas Tech; Jordy Nelson Sr., Kansas State.
- OT: Jake Long Sr., Michigan; Anthony Collins Jr., Kansas.
- G: Duke Robinson Jr., Oklahoma; Martin O'Donnell Sr., Illinois.
- C: Steve Justice Sr., Wake Forest.
- TE: Martin Rucker Sr., Missouri.
- All-purpose: Jeremy Maclin, Fr., Missouri.
- K: Thomas Weber, Fr., Arizona State.

==== Defense ====
- DE: Chris Long Sr., Virginia; George Selvie, So., South Florida.
- DT: Glenn Dorsey Sr., LSU; Sedrick Ellis Sr., USC.
- LB: Dan Connor Sr., Penn State; James Laurinaitis Jr., Ohio State; Jordon Dizon Sr., Colorado.
- CB: Aqib Talib Jr., Kansas; Antoine Cason Sr., Arizona.
- S: Craig Steltz Sr., LSU; Jamie Silva Sr., Boston College.
- P: Kevin Huber Jr., Cincinnati.

== Milestones ==
The following teams and players set all-time NCAA Division I FBS (formerly Division I-A) records during the season:

Record	Player/Team	Date/Opponent	Previous Record Holder	Source
Most consecutive pass attempts without an interception, career	André Woodson, Kentucky, 325	September 22, vs. Arkansas	Trent Dilfer, Fresno State, 271 (1993)	
Most career extra points	Art Carmody, Louisville, 253	September 29, vs. NC State	Shaun Suisham, Bowling Green, 226 (2001–2004)	
Most consecutive pass attempts with only one interception, career	André Woodson, Kentucky, 343	October 4, vs. South Carolina	Woodson, 333 (2006–2007)	
Most combined rushing yards by teammates in a single game	Felix Jones and Darren McFadden, Arkansas (487 yards)	November 3, vs. South Carolina	Tony Sands and Chip Hilleary, Kansas (476 yards) (1991-11-23)	
Most points scored, both teams (regulation)	North Texas and Navy, 136	November 10	San Jose State vs. Rice, 133 points (2004-10-02)	
Most points scored in one quarter, both teams	North Texas and Navy, 63	November 10	San Jose State vs. Hawaiʻi, 61 points (1999-11-06)	
Most wins by two points or fewer in a season by a team	Virginia, 5	November 3 vs. Wake Forest	Columbia, 4 (1971)	
Most all-purpose yards by a freshman	Jeremy Maclin, Missouri, 2,713	November 17, vs. Kansas State	Terrell Willis, Rutgers, 2,026 (1993)	
Most touchdown passes in a career	Colt Brennan, Hawaiʻi, 131	November 23 vs. Boise State	Ty Detmer, BYU, 121 (1988–1991)	
Most touchdowns responsible for in a career	Colt Brennan, Hawaiʻi, 146	November 23 vs. Boise State	Ty Detmer, BYU, 136 (1988–1991)	
Most touchdown passes in a season by a freshman quarterback	Sam Bradford, Oklahoma, 34	November 24, vs. Oklahoma State	David Neill and Colt McCoy, 29	
Most career points scored by a kicker	Art Carmody, Louisville, 433	November 29, vs. Rutgers	Roman Anderson, Houston, 423 (1988–1991)	
Most rushing attempts in a season	Kevin Smith, UCF, 415	December 1, vs. Tulsa	Marcus Allen, USC, 403 (1981)	
Most rushing touchdowns by a quarterback in a season	Tim Tebow, Florida, 23	January 1, vs. Michigan	Chase Harridge, Air Force, 22 (2002)	
Most consecutive games with 300 or more yards passing by a quarterback	Paul Smith, Tulsa, 14	January 6 vs. Bowling Green	Ty Detmer, BYU, 13 (1990–1991)	
Greatest margin of victory in a bowl game	Tulsa, 56 points (63–7)	January 6 vs. Bowling Green	Alabama, 55 points (61–6) vs. Syracuse, 1953 Orange Bowl (1953-01-01)	

== Coaching changes ==
=== Pre-season ===
Team	Former coach	New coach
Indiana	Terry Hoeppner	Bill Lynch

=== Post-season ===
Team	Former coach	Interim	New coach
Arkansas	Houston Nutt	Reggie Herring	Bobby Petrino
Baylor	Guy Morriss		Art Briles
Colorado State	Sonny Lubick		Steve Fairchild
Duke	Ted Roof		David Cutcliffe
Georgia Tech	Chan Gailey	Jon Tenuta	Paul Johnson
Hawaiʻi	June Jones		Greg McMackin
Houston	Art Briles	Chris Thurmond	Kevin Sumlin
Michigan	Lloyd Carr		Rich Rodriguez
Mississippi	Ed Orgeron		Houston Nutt
Navy	Paul Johnson		Ken Niumatalolo
Nebraska	Bill Callahan	Tom Osborne	Bo Pelini
Northern Illinois	Joe Novak		Jerry Kill
SMU	Phil Bennett		June Jones
Southern Miss	Jeff Bower		Larry Fedora
Texas A&M	Dennis Franchione	Gary Darnell	Mike Sherman
UCLA	Karl Dorrell	DeWayne Walker	Rick Neuheisel
Washington State	Bill Doba		Paul Wulff
West Virginia	Rich Rodriguez	Bill Stewart	

== Attendances ==
#	Team	G	Total	Average
1	Michigan	8	882,115	110,264
2	Penn State	7	762,419	108,917
3	Ohio State	7	735,773	105,110
4	Tennessee	7	727,426	103,918
5	Georgia	7	649,222	92,746
6	LSU	7	648,334	92,619
7	Alabama	7	644,966	92,138
8	Florida	7	632,715	90,388
9	Southern California	6	524,855	87,476
10	Texas	6	510,865	85,144
11	Oklahoma	7	594,005	84,858
12	Auburn	8	677,510	84,689
13	Nebraska	7	591,506	84,501
14	Texas A&M	7	575,450	82,207
15	Wisconsin	7	572,227	81,747
16	Clemson	7	569,342	81,335
17	Notre Dame	7	565,745	80,821
18	Florida State	5	402,987	80,597
19	South Carolina	7	549,269	78,467
20	UCLA	6	458,271	76,379
21	Iowa	6	423,510	70,585
22	Michigan State	7	493,779	70,540
23	Kentucky	8	550,588	68,824
24	Washington	7	474,124	67,732
25	Virginia Tech	7	463,631	66,233
26	Arkansas	8	528,260	66,033
27	BYU	6	386,980	64,497
28	California	6	378,816	63,136
29	Arizona State	8	503,003	62,875
30	West Virginia	6	362,399	60,400
31	Missouri	6	361,393	60,232
32	Virginia	6	358,944	59,824
33	Purdue	7	415,279	59,326
34	Oregon	7	411,915	58,845
35	North Carolina	6	344,500	57,417
36	North Carolina State	7	394,493	56,356
37	Illinois	6	329,229	54,872
38	South Florida	6	319,019	53,170
39	Arizona	6	312,963	52,161
40	Texas Tech	6	311,467	51,911
41	Minnesota	7	362,538	51,791
42	Maryland	6	307,580	51,263
43	Colorado	6	303,051	50,509
44	Georgia Tech	7	351,959	50,280
45	Mississippi	7	347,930	49,704
46	Iowa State	7	346,233	49,462
47	Mississippi State	6	295,775	49,296
48	Kansas State	6	284,296	47,383
49	Kansas	7	327,491	46,784
50	UCF	7	308,129	44,018
51	Rutgers	8	349,306	43,663
52	Miami Hurricanes	7	305,124	43,589
53	Hawaii	7	304,600	43,514
54	Utah	6	255,557	42,593
55	Boston College	7	293,927	41,990
56	East Carolina	6	249,219	41,537
57	Oregon State	6	248,244	41,374
58	Oklahoma State	6	240,144	40,024
59	Louisville	6	239,287	39,881
60	Stanford	8	314,657	39,332
61	Connecticut	7	267,435	38,205
62	Air Force	6	228,405	38,068
63	Indiana	7	259,025	37,004
64	UTEP	6	219,411	36,569
65	Fresno State	6	217,743	36,291
66	Syracuse	7	245,064	35,009
67	Vanderbilt	8	277,034	34,629
68	Navy	6	207,702	34,617
69	Baylor	6	206,266	34,378
70	Pittsburgh	7	233,203	33,315
71	Washington State	6	198,268	33,045
72	Wake Forest	6	195,570	32,595
73	Army	5	158,559	31,712
74	Boise State	7	212,366	30,338
75	Cincinnati	6	181,477	30,246
76	Marshall	6	180,120	30,020
77	TCU	6	180,109	30,018
78	New Mexico	7	208,259	29,751
79	Memphis	7	207,688	29,670
80	UNLV	6	175,684	29,281
81	Temple	6	173,151	28,859
82	San Diego State	6	167,637	27,940
83	Southern Miss	6	160,324	26,721
84	Tulane	7	182,784	26,112
85	Northern Illinois	6	150,819	25,137
86	Northwestern	7	172,125	24,589
87	Tulsa	6	147,233	24,539
88	Wyoming	6	133,138	22,190
89	Colorado State	6	130,762	21,794
90	Houston	6	125,730	20,955
91	Troy	5	102,397	20,479
92	Duke	5	100,321	20,064
93	Western Michigan	6	116,963	19,494
94	Central Michigan	5	93,853	18,771
95	Toledo	7	130,675	18,668
96	Louisiana Tech	5	92,812	18,562
97	Middle Tennessee	5	92,650	18,530
98	North Texas	5	88,672	17,734
99	SMU	6	103,024	17,171
100	Nevada	6	102,524	17,087
101	Arkansas State	6	102,237	17,040
102	UAB	5	83,529	16,706
103	Louisiana-Lafayette	6	99,904	16,651
104	Louisiana-Monroe	5	83,253	16,651
105	Ohio	6	99,002	16,500
106	Akron	5	81,775	16,355
107	Miami RedHawks	5	80,931	16,186
108	Bowling Green	5	80,398	16,080
109	Florida Atlantic	5	78,705	15,741
110	San Jose State	5	77,323	15,465
111	New Mexico State	7	100,884	14,412
112	Buffalo	5	67,842	13,568
113	Rice	6	80,118	13,353
114	Utah State	5	65,656	13,131
115	Ball State	5	65,424	13,085
116	Idaho	6	68,874	11,479
117	Kent State	5	44,994	8,999
118	Florida International	5	39,909	7,982
119	Eastern Michigan	5	37,241	7,448
