= 2007 South Florida Bulls football team =

American college football season

2007 South Florida Bulls football

Sun Bowl, L 21–56 vs. Oregon
- Conference: Big East Conference
- Record: 9–4 (4–3 Big East)
- Head coach: Jim Leavitt (11th season)
- Offensive coordinator: Greg Gregory (1st season)
- Offensive scheme: Spread
- Defensive coordinator: Wally Burnham (7th season)
- Base defense: 3–4
- Home stadium: Raymond James Stadium

2007 Big East Conference football standings
	Conf.			Overall
Team	W		L	W		L
No. 6 West Virginia $+	5	–	2	11	–	2
Connecticut +	5	–	2	9	–	4
No. 17 Cincinnati	4	–	3	10	–	3
South Florida	4	–	3	9	–	4
Rutgers	3	–	4	8	–	5
Louisville	3	–	4	6	–	6
Pittsburgh	3	–	4	5	–	7
Syracuse	1	–	6	2	–	10
$ – BCS representative as conference champion; + – Conference co-champions; Rankings from AP Poll

The 2007 South Florida Bulls football team represented the University of South Florida (USF) in the 2007 NCAA Division I FBS football season. Their head coach was Jim Leavitt; they played all of their home games at Raymond James Stadium in Tampa, Florida. The 2007 college football season was the 11th season overall for the Bulls and their third season in the Big East Conference.

2007 marked the first year that South Florida had been ranked in any poll. Following Week 3, they were ranked No. 23 in the AP Poll and No. 24 in the Coaches Poll. After a decisive win against UCF in Week 7, the Bulls made their first ever appearance in the BCS rankings, debuting at No. 2 and trailing only the Ohio State Buckeyes. Three straight losses to Rutgers, UConn, and Cincinnati dropped them out of the Top 25, but they won their next three games to improve to 9–3 and climb back up to No. 21 in the BCS poll.

USF averaged 53,170 fans in its six home games at Raymond James Stadium in 2007. Prior to this season, USF's single game attendance record for a home game was 49,212 vs. Kentucky Wesleyan in the Bulls' very first game on September 6, 1997. The new single game home record is now 67,012 for the September 28 game against West Virginia. In 2006, USF's average attendance was 30,222, so the Bulls' increase this year was 22,948 over last year.

== Schedule ==
Date	Time	Opponent	Rank	Site	TV	Result	Attendance	Source
September 1	7:00 p.m.	Elon*		Raymond James Stadium; Tampa, FL	GamePlan	W 28–13	33,639	
September 8	9:00 p.m.	at No. 17 Auburn*		Jordan–Hare Stadium; Auburn, AL	ESPN2	W 26–23 ^{OT}	82,617	
September 22	12:00 p.m.	North Carolina*	No. 23	Raymond James Stadium; Tampa, FL	ESPN	W 37–10	37,693	
September 28	8:00 p.m.	No. 5 West Virginia	No. 18	Raymond James Stadium; Tampa, FL	ESPN2	W 21–13	67,012	
October 6	3:30 p.m.	at Florida Atlantic*	No. 6	Lockhart Stadium; Fort Lauderdale, FL (rivalry)	ESPNU	W 35–23	21,106	
October 13	12:00 p.m.	UCF*	No. 5	Raymond James Stadium; Tampa, FL (rivalry)	ESPNU	W 64–12	65,948	
October 18	7:45 p.m.	at Rutgers	No. 2	Rutgers Stadium; Piscataway, NJ	ESPN	L 27–30	44,267	
October 27	3:30 p.m.	at UConn	No. 10	Rentschler Field; East Hartford, CT	ABC	L 15–22	40,000	
November 3	3:30 p.m.	Cincinnati^{†}	No. 20	Raymond James Stadium; Tampa, FL	ABC	L 33–38	57,379	
November 10	12:00 p.m.	at Syracuse		Carrier Dome; Syracuse, NY	ESPN Plus	W 41–10	38,039	
November 17	8:00 p.m.	Louisville		Raymond James Stadium; Tampa, FL	ESPNU	W 55–17	57,288	
November 24	12:00 p.m.	at Pittsburgh		Heinz Field; Pittsburgh, PA	ESPN Plus	W 48–37	31,123	
December 31	2:00 p.m.	vs. Oregon*	No. 23	Sun Bowl; El Paso, TX (Sun Bowl)	CBS	L 21–56	49,867	
*Non-conference game; ^{†}Homecoming; Rankings from AP Poll released prior to the game; All times are in Eastern time

== Game summaries ==
=== Elon ===
	1	2	3	4	Total
Phoenix	0	3	3	7	13
Bulls	0	7	14	7	28

The Bulls played a "vanilla offense" in preparation for their next game against Auburn. Plays were limited to a few selections, and there were many substitutions. USF merely wanted to win this game and save their players for the game against Auburn. The attendance was announced at 33,639. Sophomore QB Matt Grothe was 23–39 for 238 yards, two touchdowns and no interceptions. True freshman Mike Ford was the leading rusher with 83 yards on 6 carries and two touchdowns. Senior Amarri Jackson led the receivers with 63 yards and a touchdown.

=== Auburn ===
	1	2	3	4	OT	Total
Bulls	14	0	0	6	6	26
#17/13 Tigers	3	14	0	3	3	23

Even after four missed field goals, the Bulls upset number 17-ranked Auburn 26–23 in overtime. Grothe threw for 184 yards and a touchdown, while Ford again led the running backs with 74 yards and a touchdown on the ground. Sophomore WR Jessie Hester Jr. had 64 yards receiving and caught the game-winning touchdown in overtime.

A week after the game, the Bulls entered both polls for the first time in school history, entering the AP Poll at No. 23 and the Coaches Poll at #24.

=== North Carolina ===
	1	2	3	4	Total
Tar Heels	0	3	0	7	10
#23/24 Bulls	14	6	10	7	37

The Bulls received their first ever AP/Coaches top 25 ranking with a convincing win over the Tar Heels. Many said that the Bulls would overlook UNC in preparation for the show-down with West Virginia the following week, but the Bulls proved otherwise. Grothe threw for 230 yards and a touchdown and junior Williams led the Bulls with 64 yards rushing and a score. Hester Jr. and junior wideout Taurus Johnson had 3 catches for 34 yards apiece. However, the heroes of the day were the Bulls' defense, who dominated UNC forcing three interceptions and allowing under 180 total yards. The Tar Heels did not score their touchdown until there was less than one minute left in regulation and the Bulls had their second string defense on the field.

=== West Virginia ===
	1	2	3	4	Total
#5 Mountaineers	0	3	3	7	13
#18 Bulls	7	7	7	0	21

The Bulls beat the No. 5 ranked team in the nation, before their first-ever sold out home crowd, with a total of announced attendance of 67,012. The Bulls are now 2–1 against West Virginia.

=== Florida Atlantic ===
	1	2	3	4	Total
Owls	0	7	10	6	23
#6 Bulls	7	0	14	14	35

Nursing a "West Virginia hangover" from their upset the week before, the Bulls looked sloppy against the Owls. However, Benjamin Williams put the game out of reach with his fourth rushing touchdown with less than 40 seconds to go. Williams finished with 186 rushing yards on 25 carries. In addition, the Bulls helped FAU achieve their highest recorded attendance in either Lockhart Stadium or Dolphin Stadium.

=== UCF ===
	1	2	3	4	Total
Knights	7	3	0	2	12
#5 Bulls	12	17	14	21	64

The Bulls proved their No. 5 ranking is no fluke by decimating the cross-state Knights 64–12 in front of a home crowd announced at 65,948. The Bulls held the Knights to just 145 total yards and Kevin Smith, who came in as the nation's leading rusher at 172 yards per game, to just 55 yards. South Florida gained 543 total yards—over three times as much as UCF—while holding the ball three fewer minutes than the Knights.

After losses by LSU and Cal, South Florida moved into No. 2 in the AP Poll (behind Ohio State) and No. 3 in the Coaches and Harris Polls (behind Ohio State and Boston College), earning first-place votes in all three. When the first BCS rankings were announced, the Bulls were No. 2 behind Ohio State. Even though they were No. 3 in the Coaches and Harris Polls, they swept through the computer rankings, getting No. 1 in all but one of them.

=== Rutgers ===
	1	2	3	4	Total
#2/3 Bulls	10	7	3	7	27
Scarlet Knights	3	10	14	3	30

The Bulls experienced a return to reality with a heartbreaking loss to Rutgers. Down 7 going into the 4th quarter, the Bulls could not find their footing.

=== Connecticut ===
	1	2	3	4	Total
#11/12 Bulls	0	0	9	6	15
Huskies	3	13	3	3	22

After suffering through the first half of the game, USF overcame a 16-point deficit and nearly won the game. In the end, it came down to whether or not the Bulls could score one touchdown on fourth down with less than one minute remaining in the game. If the touchdown had been successful, the Bulls could have either sent the game into overtime or won by one point with a two-point conversion. Unfortunately for South Florida, the throw was incomplete and Connecticut won the game by 7 points.

=== Cincinnati ===
	1	2	3	4	Total
Bearcats	31	7	0	0	38
#20/21 Bulls	14	6	7	6	33

The Bulls put 14 points on the board before the offense even touched the football. Trae Williams ran an interception back 73 yards for a touchdown, and Mike Jenkins took a kickoff return 100 yards for another touchdown in the longest play in USF history. Cincinnati scored 31 points in the first quarter, a school record for the most points in any quarter, and led 38–20 at the half.

USF shut down the Bearcats' scoring in the second half, and closed the score to 38–33 with 2 minutes to go. After stopping UC on a fake field goal try with less than 30 seconds remaining, the Bulls had one last try for the win. They moved from their own 39 to the UC 18 and had two chances to score the winning touchdown with 8 seconds left, but it was not to be. The first try, to Carlton Mitchell, was broken up by Mike Mickens in the end zone. With 2 seconds remaining, Grothe fired the ball to Jessie Hester and even though the replay clearly showed Hester being interfered by UC's Anthony Williams, Hester still had a shot at the ball but couldn't bring it in, and the officials did not call a penalty.

Attendance was announced at 57,379.

The Bulls dropped to No. 28 in the BCS standings after the loss, just 3 weeks after debuting in the BCS Poll at #2.

=== Syracuse ===
	1	2	3	4	Total
Bulls	7	13	21	0	41
Orange	0	3	7	0	10

Looking to end a three-game losing skid, the Bulls recorded a lopsided victory over the Orange. Mike Ford rushed for 123 yards and two touchdowns, while the Bulls set a new school record for total offense with 536 yards.

=== Louisville ===
	1	2	3	4	Total
Cardinals	3	7	0	7	17
Bulls	20	21	0	14	55

In the final game at Raymond James Stadium for the 2007 season, Louisville was looking for their 6th win of the year so that they could become bowl eligible. But, destiny was on the Bulls' side from the very first play. USF kicked off the ball to Louisville and instead of returning the ball, Louisville fumbled it. Nate Allen successfully recovered the ball for South Florida and scored the fastest touchdown in school history (8 game seconds). From that moment on, Louisville simply could not keep up. By the end of the first half, the score was a shocking 41–10. And once the game was over, the Bulls defeated the Cardinals 55–17.

The following day, USF did not re-emerge in the Associated Press or Coach's Polls. However, they did rank No. 23 in the BCS standings.

=== Pittsburgh ===
	1	2	3	4	Total
Bulls	7	3	17	21	48
Panthers	7	7	0	23	37

Two days after winning the game against Pittsburgh, it was announced that USF would be play in the Brut Sun Bowl against a team from the Pac-10 Conference.

=== Sun Bowl ===
	1	2	3	4	Total
#23/25 Bulls	0	14	0	7	21
Ducks	8	10	28	10	56

USF faced the Oregon Ducks in the Brut Sun Bowl on December 31, 2007. The two teams started out playing undisciplined football and easily set a Sun Bowl record for most penalties in the bowl's history for one game. USF trailed by only four, 18–14, at halftime. In the second half, Oregon exploded on offense, leading to a 56–21 rout of the Bulls. With the loss, USF fell to 1–2 in bowl games.

== Rankings ==
Ranking movements Legend: ██ Increase in ranking ██ Decrease in ranking — = Not ranked RV = Received votes т = Tied with team above or below ( ) = First-place votes
	Week															
Poll	Pre	1	2	3	4	5	6	7	8	9	10	11	12	13	14	Final
AP	RV	RV	RV	23	18	6	5	2 (11)	11	20	RV	RV	RV	25	23	RV
Coaches	RV	RV	RV	24	18	9	5 т	3 (3)	12	21	RV	—	RV	RV	25	RV
Harris	Not released				20	10	6	3 (2)	12	20	RV	RV	RV	25	24	Not released
BCS	Not released							2	10	18	—	—	23	21	21	Not released
