= Washington Huskies football statistical leaders =

The Washington Huskies football statistical leaders are individual statistical leaders of the Washington Huskies football program in various categories. Starting in the 2024 season, the Huskies represent the University of Washington in the NCAA Division I FBS Big Ten Conference. Washington's first football season was in 1889.

These lists are dominated by more recent players for several reasons:

- Since 1920s, seasons have increased to 10 or more games.
- The NCAA didn't allow freshmen to play varsity football until 1972 (with the exception of the World War II years), allowing players to have four-year careers.
- In 1975, the Pacific-8 Conference removed a restriction which limited the league's bowl game participation to a single representative tied to the Rose Bowl Game.
- The official NCAA record book does not include bowl games in statistical records until 2002, with most colleges also structuring their record books this way.
- The Pac-12, in which Washington was a member from 1915 (Note: The current charter of the Pac-12 dates only to the formation of the Athletic Association of Western Universities (AAWU) in 1959. The Pac-12 claims the history of the Pacific Coast Conference, which operated from 1915 to 1959, as its own. Immediately after the PCC dissolved, five PCC members, including Washington, reorganized as the AAWU, which by the late 1960s added three other final PCC members.) until its effective demise after the 2023 season, held a championship game from 2011 through 2023. Washington appeared in the game three times, giving players in those seasons yet another game to compile statistics. For 2024 and beyond, with Washington joining the Big Ten, Huskies players have the opportunity for an extra game should the team reach a future Big Ten championship game.
- Due to COVID-19 issues, the NCAA ruled that the 2020 season would not count against the athletic eligibility of any football player, giving everyone who played in that season the opportunity for five years of eligibility instead of the normal four.
- The 2023 team earned a berth in the 2023 College Football Playoff and reached the CFP championship game, thus playing in 15 games.

These lists are updated through Week 12 of the 2026 season. Currently active players are in bold.

== Passing ==
=== Passing yards ===
Career
Rk	Player	Yards	Years
1	Jake Browning	12,296	2015 2016 2017 2018
2	Cody Pickett	10,220	1999 2000 2001 2002 2003
3	Michael Penix Jr.	9,544	2022 2023
4	Keith Price	8,919	2010 2011 2012 2013
5	Jake Locker	7,639	2007 2008 2009 2010
6	Brock Huard	6,391	1996 1997 1998
7	**Demond Williams Jr.**	6,191	2024 2025 2026
8	Damon Huard	5,886	1992 1993 1994 1995
9	Marques Tuiasosopo	5,879	1997 1998 1999 2000
10	Sonny Sixkiller	5,496	1970 1971 1972

Single season
Rk	Player	Yards	Year
1	Michael Penix Jr.	4,903	2023
2	Michael Penix Jr.	4,641	2022
3	Cody Pickett	4,458	2002
4	Jake Browning	3,430	2016
5	Jake Browning	3,192	2018
6	Jacob Eason	3,132	2019
7	Demond Williams Jr.	3,065	2025
8	Keith Price	3,063	2011
9	Cody Pickett	3,043	2003
10	Keith Price	2,966	2013

Single game
Rk	Player	Yards	Year	Opponent
1	Michael Penix Jr.	516	2022	Arizona
2	Michael Penix Jr.	485	2022	Washington State
3	Michael Penix Jr.	473	2023	Michigan State
4	Cody Pickett	455	2001	Arizona
5	Michael Penix Jr.	450	2023	Boise State
6	Cody Pickett	438	2002	Idaho
	Keith Price	438	2011	Baylor (bowl)
8	Michael Penix Jr.	430	2023	Texas (bowl)
9	Cody Pickett	429	2002	UCLA
10	Cary Conklin	428	1989	Arizona State

=== Passing touchdowns ===
Career
Rk	Player	TDs	Years
1	Jake Browning	94	2015 2016 2017 2018
2	Keith Price	75	2010 2011 2012 2013
3	Michael Penix Jr.	67	2022 2023
4	Cody Pickett	55	1999 2000 2001 2002 2003
5	Brock Huard	53	1996 1997 1998
	Jake Locker	53	2007 2008 2009 2010
7	**Demond Williams Jr.**	47	2024 2025 2026
8	Sonny Sixkiller	35	1970 1971 1972
9	Damon Huard	34	1992 1993 1994 1995
	Chris Chandler	34	1984 1985 1986 1987

Single season
Rk	Player	TDs	Year
1	Jake Browning	43	2016
2	Michael Penix Jr.	36	2023
3	Keith Price	33	2011
4	Michael Penix Jr.	31	2022
5	Cody Pickett	28	2002
6	Brock Huard	25	1997
	Demond Williams Jr.	25	2025
8	Billy Joe Hobert	24	1991
9	Jacob Eason	23	2019
10	Jake Locker	21	2009
	Keith Price	21	2013

Single game
Rk	Player	TDs	Year	Opponent
1	Jake Browning	6	2016	Oregon
	Jake Browning	6	2016	California
3	Chris Rowland	5	1973	California
	Jake Locker	5	2010	Oregon State
	Keith Price	5	2012	Colorado
	Jake Browning	5	2016	Idaho
	Michael Penix Jr.	5	2023	Boise State
8	39 times by 14 players	4	Most recent: Demond WIlliams Jr.	

== Rushing ==
=== Rushing yards ===
Career
Rk	Player	Yards	Years
1	Myles Gaskin	5,323	2015 2016 2017 2018
2	Napoleon Kaufman	4,106	1991 1992 1993 1994
3	Chris Polk	4,049	2008 2009 2010 2011
4	Bishop Sankey	3,496	2011 2012 2013
5	Joe Steele	3,168	1976 1977 1978 1979
6	Greg Lewis	2,903	1987 1988 1989 1990
7	Vince Weathersby	2,811	1985 1986 1987 1988
8	Jacque Robinson	2,636	1981 1982 1983 1984
9	Hugh McElhenny	2,499	1949 1950 1951
10	Louis Rankin	2,480	2004 2005 2006 2007

Single season
Rk	Player	Yards	Year
1	Bishop Sankey	1,870	2013
2	Corey Dillon	1,695	1996
3	Chris Polk	1,488	2011
4	Bishop Sankey	1,439	2012
5	Chris Polk	1,415	2010
6	Greg Lewis	1,407	1990
7	Napoleon Kaufman	1,390	1994
8	Myles Gaskin	1,380	2017
9	Myles Gaskin	1,373	2016
10	Myles Gaskin	1,302	2015

Single game
Rk	Player	Yards	Year	Opponent
1	Hugh McElhenny	296	1950	Washington State
2	Chris Polk	284	2010	Washington State
3	Corey Dillon	259	1996	Oregon
4	Credell Green	258	1955	Washington State
5	Dillon Johnson	256	2023	USC
6	Louis Rankin	255	2007	Stanford
7	Napoleon Kaufman	254	1994	San Jose State
8	Dennis Fitzpatrick	249	1974	Washington State
9	Bishop Sankey	241	2013	California
10	Napoleon Kaufman	227	1994	UCLA

=== Rushing touchdowns ===
Career
Rk	Player	TDs	Years
1	Myles Gaskin	57	2015 2016 2017
2	Bishop Sankey	37	2011 2012 2013
3	Napoleon Kaufman	34	1991 1992 1993 1994
4	Joe Steele	32	1976 1977 1978 1979
5	Rashaan Shehee	29	1994 1995 1996 1997
	Jake Locker	29	2007 2008 2009 2010
7	Hugh McElhenny	28	1949 1950 1951
	Rich Alexis	28	2000 2001 2002 2003
9	Jacque Robinson	27	1981 1982 1983 1984
10	Chris Polk	26	2008 2009 2010 2011

Single season
Rk	Player	TDs	Year
1	Corey Dillon	24	1996
2	Myles Gaskin	21	2017
3	Bishop Sankey	20	2013
4	Bishop Sankey	16	2012
	Dillon Johnson	16	2023
6	Rashaan Shehee	15	1995
	Jonah Coleman	15	2025
8	Jacque Robinson	14	1984
	Napoleon Kaufman	14	1993
	Myles Gaskin	14	2015

Single game
Rk	Player	TDs	Year	Opponent
1	Ervin Daily	7	1919	Whitman
2	Hugh McElhenny	5	1950	Washington State
	Corey Dillon	5	1996	UCLA
	Jonah Coleman	5	2025	UC Davis
5	Pete Taggares	4	1972	UCLA
	Myles Gaskin	4	2015	Southern Miss, (bowl)
	Myles Gaskin	4	2017	Washington State
	Dillon Johnson	4	2023	USC

== Receiving ==
=== Receptions ===
Career
Rk	Player	Rec	Years
1	Reggie Williams	243	2001 2002 2003
2	Rome Odunze	214	2020 2021 2022 2023
3	Jaydon Mickens	203	2012 2013 2014 2015
4	Jermaine Kearse	180	2008 2009 2010 2011
5	Jalen McMillan	164	2020 2021 2022 2023
6	Dante Pettis	163	2014 2015 2016 2017
7	Kasen Williams	162	2011 2012 2013 2014
8	Paul Skansi	161	1979 1980 1981 1982
9	Aaron Fuller	159	2016 2017 2018 2019
10	Austin Seferian-Jenkins	146	2011 2012 2013

Single season
Rk	Player	Rec	Year
1	Reggie Williams	94	2002
2	Rome Odunze	92	2023
3	Reggie Williams	89	2003
4	Giles Jackson	85	2024
5	John Ross	81	2016
6	Jalen McMillan	79	2022
7	Kasen Williams	77	2012
8	Rome Odunze	75	2022
9	Jerome Pathon	73	1997
10	Dane Looker	72	1998

Single game
Rk	Player	Rec	Year	Opponent
1	Braxton Cleman	15	2002	USC
2	Reggie Williams	14	2002	Oregon
3	Reggie Williams	13	2003	Arizona
4	Dane Looker	12	1998	USC
	Reggie Williams	12	2002	Washington State
	John Ross	12	2016	Arizona State
	Dante Pettis	12	2017	Oregon State
	Chris Lawson	12	2026	Nebraska
9	Jim Cope	11	1966	USC
	Jim Krieg	11	1970	USC
	Dane Looker	11	1998	Arizona State
	Reggie Williams	11	2001	Washington State
	Giles Jackson	11	2024	Louisville, Sun Bowl

=== Receiving yards ===
Career
Rk	Player	Yards	Years
1	Reggie Williams	3,598	2001 2002 2003
2	Rome Odunze	3,272	2020 2021 2022 2023
3	Jermaine Kearse	2,871	2008 2009 2010 2011
4	Mario Bailey	2,306	1988 1989 1990 1991
5	Jerome Pathon	2,275	1995 1996 1997
6	Dante Pettis	2,256	2014 2015 2016 2017
7	Jaydon Mickens	2,187	2012 2013 2014 2015
8	Jalen McMillan	2,143	2020 2021 2022 2023
9	Aaron Fuller	2,051	2016 2017 2018 2019
10	Paul Skansi	1,992	1979 1980 1981 1982

Single season
Rk	Player	Yards	Year
1	Rome Odunze	1,640	2023
2	Reggie Williams	1,454	2002
3	Jerome Pathon	1,299	1997
4	Mario Bailey	1,163	1991
5	Ja'Lynn Polk	1,159	2023
6	John Ross	1,150	2016
7	Rome Odunze	1,145	2022
8	Reggie Williams	1,109	2003
9	Jalen McMillan	1,098	2022
10	Andre Riley	1,071	1989

Single game
Rk	Player	Yards	Year	Opponent
1	Dave Williams	257	1965	UCLA
2	Andre Riley	223	1989	Arizona State
3	Charles Frederick	216	2003	Oregon State
4	Darryl Franklin	209	1987	Stanford
5	John Ross	208	2016	California
6	Reggie Williams	203	2001	Washington State
7	Reggie Williams	198	2002	Oregon
	Jermaine Kearse	198	2011	Baylor, Alamo Bowl
9	Jim Cope	195	1966	USC
	Jerome Pathon	195	1997	Nebraska

=== Receiving touchdowns ===
Career
Rk	Player	TDs	Years
1	Mario Bailey	30	1988 1989 1990 1991
2	Jermaine Kearse	29	2008 2009 2010 2011
3	Dante Pettis	24	2014 2015 2016 2017
	Rome Odunze	24	2020 2021 2022 2023
5	Reggie Williams	22	2001 2002 2003
	John Ross	22	2013 2014 2016
7	Austin Seferian-Jenkins	21	2011 2012 2013
8	Denzel Boston	20	2022 2023 2024 2025
9	Spider Gaines	17	1975 1976 1977 1978
	Jerome Pathon	17	1995 1996 1997
	Jalen McMillan	17	2020 2021 2022 2023

Single season
Rk	Player	TDs	Year
1	Mario Bailey	18	1991
2	John Ross	17	2016
3	Dante Pettis	15	2016
4	Rome Odunze	13	2023
5	Jermaine Kearse	12	2010
6	Reggie Williams	11	2002
	Denzel Boston	11	2025
8	Dave Williams	10	1965
9	Anthony Allen	9	1982
	Fred Coleman	9	1997
	Jalen McMillan	9	2022
	Ja'Lynn Polk	9	2023
	Denzel Boston	9	2024

Single game
Rk	Player	TDs	Year	Opponent
1	Jermaine Kearse	4	2010	Oregon State
	Giles Jackson	4	2024	Louisville, Sun Bowl
3	Roland Kirkby	3	1950	Kansas State
	Dave Williams	3	1965	UCLA
	Al Maurer	3	1970	Stanford
	Brian Slater	3	1986	Washington State
	Brian Slater	3	1988	USC
	Mario Bailey	3	1991	Toledo
	Mario Bailey	3	1991	Oregon State
	Reggie Williams	3	2002	Arizona
	Reggie Williams	3	2002	Oregon
	Jermaine Kearse	3	2010	Syracuse
	John Ross	3	2016	Oregon
	John Ross	3	2016	California
	Dante Pettis	3	2016	California
	Dante Pettis	3	2017	Fresno State
	Dante Pettis	3	2017	Oregon State
	Ja'Lynn Polk	3	2022	Michigan State
	Jack Westover	3	2023	Michigan State

== Total offense ==
Total offense is the sum of passing and rushing statistics. It does not include receiving or returns.

Washington's record book does not list any leaders in "touchdowns responsible for", the official NCAA term for combined passing and rushing touchdowns.

=== Total offense yards ===
Career
Rk	Player	Yards	Years
1	Jake Browning	12,540	2015 2016 2017 2018
2	Cody Pickett	10,103	1999 2000 2001 2002
3	Michael Penix Jr.	9,644	2022 2023
4	Jake Locker	9,578	2007 2008 2009 2010
5	Keith Price	9,018	2010 2011 2012 2013
6	**Demond Williams Jr.**	7,445	2024 2025 2026
7	Marques Tuiasosopo	7,374	1997 1998 1999 2000
8	Brock Huard	6,330	1996 1997 1998
9	Damon Huard	6,004	1992 1993 1994 1995
10	Myles Gaskin	5,325	2015 2016 2017 2018

Single season
Rk	Player	Yards	Year
1	Michael Penix Jr.	4,911	2023
2	Michael Penix Jr.	4,733	2022
3	Cody Pickett	4,273	2002
4	Demond Williams Jr.	3,676	2025
5	Jake Browning	3,475	2016
6	Jake Browning	3,331	2018
7	Jake Locker	3,188	2009
8	Keith Price	3,074	2013
9	Keith Price	3,073	2011
10	Jake Locker	3,048	2007

Single game
Rk	Player	Yards	Year	Opponent
1	Demond Williams Jr.	538	2025	Rutgers
2	Michael Penix Jr.	529	2022	Arizona
3	Michael Penix Jr.	519	2022	Washington State
4	Marques Tuiasosopo	509	1999	Stanford
5	Jake Locker	493	2007	Arizona
6	Keith Price	477	2011	Baylor, (bowl)
7	Cody Pickett	473	2001	Arizona
	Michael Penix Jr.	473	2023	Michigan State
9	Michael Penix Jr.	461	2023	Texas, (bowl)
10	Michael Penix Jr.	448	2023	Boise State

== Defense ==
=== Interceptions ===
Career
Rk	Player	Ints	Years
1	Al Worley	18	1966 1967 1968
2	Larry Hatch	16	1946 1947 1948
3	Bill Albrecht	13	1951 1952 1954
	Roberto Jourdan	13	1972 1973 1974 1975
	Vestee Jackson	13	1983 1984 1985
6	Walter Bailey	12	1990 1991 1992
7	Calvin Jones	11	1970 1971 1972
	Reggie Reser	11	1992 1993 1994 1995
	Derrick Johnson	11	2000 2001 2002 2003 2004
	Sean Parker	11	2010 2011 2012 2013
	Marcus Peters	11	2012 2013 2014

Single season
Rk	Player	Ints	Year
1	Al Worley	14	1968
2	Bill Albrecht	12	1951
3	Larry Hatch	8	1946
	Walter Bailey	8	1991
5	Jay Stoves	7	1943
	Dick Sprague	7	1950
	Tony Bonwell	7	1972
8	George Fleming	6	1959
	Bob Schloredt	6	1959
	Roberto Jourdan	6	1972
	Joe Kelly	6	1984
	Eric Briscoe	6	1990
	Tony Parrish	6	1997
	Anthony Vontoure	6	1999
	Derrick Johnson	6	2003

Single game
Rk	Player	Ints	Year	Opponent
1	Al Worley	4	1968	Idaho
2	Russell Hairston	3	1993	Oregon
	William McGovern	3	1947	Oregon State
	Larry Hatch	3	1948	California
	Sam Mitchell	3	1952	Oregon
	Al Worley	3	1968	Wisconsin
	Steve Wiezbowski	3	1972	California
	Steve Lipe	3	1974	Iowa State
	Tim Meamber	3	1984	Northwestern

=== Tackles ===
Career and season totals since 1967, game totals since 1959.

Career
Rk	Player	Tackles	Years
1	Michael Jackson	578	1975 1976 1977 1978
2	David Rill	575	1984 1985 1986 1987
3	Dan Lloyd	502	1972 1973 1974 1975
4	Ken Driscoll	486	1979 1980 1981 1982
5	Joe Kelly^{a}	401	1982 1983 1984 1985
6	Al Burleson	389	1973 1974 1975
7	Mike Baldassin	386	1974 1975 1976
8	Mason Foster	378	2007 2008 2009 2010
9	Tim Meamber	376	1981 1982 1983 1984
10	Bruce Harrell	375	1976 1977 1978 1979

Single season
Rk	Player	Tackles	Year
1	Michael Jackson	219	1977
2	David Rill	204	1985
3	Dan Lloyd	201	1973
4	Mike Baldassin	200	1976
5	David Rill	188	1987
6	Dave Pear	185	1973
7	Ben Burr-Kirven	176	2018
8	Ricky Andrews	170	1988
9	Michael Jackson	168	1978
	James Clifford	168	1989

Single game
Rk	Player	Tackles	Year	Opponent
1	Michael Jackson	29	1977	Washington State
	Michael Jackson	29	1977	Oregon State
3	George Jugum	28	1968	Oregon
	Michael Jackson	28	1977	Mississippi State
5	Joe Krakoski	27	1983	Washington State
6	Ken Driscoll	26	1980	Oregon
7	George Jugum	25	1968	California
	Stan Walderhaug	25	1977	Syracuse
9	Michael Jackson	24	1978	Alabama
	Mark Jerue	24	1981	Arizona State

=== Sacks ===
The University provides sack totals since the 1982 season.

Career
Rk	Player	Sacks	Years
1	Hau'oli Kikaha	36.0	2010 2011 2012 2013 2014
2	Daniel Te'o-Nesheim	30.0	2006 2007 2008 2009
3	Ron Holmes	28.0	1981 1982 1983 1984
4	Donald Jones	26.0	1989 1990 1991
5	Jason Chorak	25.5	1994 1995 1996 1997
6	Andy Mason	24.0	1990 1991 1992 1993
7	Andrew Hudson	22.5	2011 2012 2013 2014
8	Reggie Rogers	20.0	1984 1985 1986
	Manase Hopoi	20.0	2002 2003 2004
10	Bralen Trice	19.0	2021 2022 2023

Single season
Rk	Player	Sacks	Year
1	Hau'oli Kikaha	19.0	2014
2	Jason Chorak	14.5	1996
3	Ron Holmes	13.0	1983
	Hau'oli Kikaha	13.0	2013
5	Donald Jones	11.5	1991
	Andrew Hudson	11.5	2014
7	Dennis Brown	11.0	1987
	Daniel Te'o-Nesheim	11.0	2009
9	Ray Cattage	10.0	1982
	Mark Stewart	10.0	1982
	Terry Johnson	10.0	2003
	Bralen Trice	10.0	2022

Single game
Rk	Player	Sacks	Year	Opponent
1	Mark Stewart	5	1982	UCLA
	Ron Holmes	5	1983	Navy
3	Steve Roberts	4	1986	BYU
	Martin Harrison	4	1989	Oregon State
	Danny Shelton	4	2014	Eastern Washington
6	Matt Jones	3.5	1990	Stanford
	Richie Chambers	3.5	1994	Ohio State
	Mac Tuiaea	3.5	1996	BYU
	Todd Johnson	3.5	1998	Utah State

== Kicking ==
=== Field goals made ===
Career
Rk	Player	FGs	Years
1	Jeff Jaeger	85	1983 1984 1985 1986
2	Peyton Henry	71	2018 2019 2020 2021 2022
3	John Anderson	68	1999 2000 2001 2002
4	Chuck Nelson	61	1980 1981 1982
5	Cameron Van Winkle	52	2013 2014 2015 2016
6	Grady Gross	46	2022 2023 2024 2025
7	Erik Folk	42	2009 2010
8	Travis Hanson	40	1990 1991 1992 1993
9	Steve Robbins	37	1974 1975 1976 1977
10	John Wales	36	1994 1995 1996

Single season
Rk	Player	FGs	Year
1	Chuck Nelson	25	1982
2	Jeff Jaeger	23	1985
3	Jeff Jaeger	22	1984
	John Anderson	22	2002
5	Jeff Jaeger	21	1983
6	Chuck Nelson	20	1980
	Cameron Van Winkle	20	2014
8	Jeff Jaeger	19	1986
	Peyton Henry	19	2019
	Peyton Henry	19	2022

Single game
Rk	Player	FGs	Year	Opponent
1	Jeff Jaeger	5	1985	Houston
	John Anderson	5	2002	Washington State
3	19 times by 11 players	4	Most recent: Grady Gross, 2024 vs. Washington State	

=== Field goal percentage ===
Career with minimum of 25 attempts; season with minimum of 15 attempts. Percentages are displayed with three decimal places, but rankings are based on absolute percentages, taken to as many decimal places as needed to break ties. The second tiebreaker is number of attempts, with higher being better.

Career
Rk	Player	FG-FGA	Pct	Years
1	Chuck Nelson	61-75	.813	1980 1981 1982
2	Cameron Van Winkle	52-64	.813	2013 2014 2015 2016
3	Jeff Jaeger	85-105	.810	1983 1984 1985 1986
4	Peyton Henry	71-88	.807	2018 2019 2020 2021 2022
5	Travis Coons	24-30	.800	2012 2013
6	Grady Gross	46-61	.754	2022 2023 2024 2025
7	John McCallum	26-35	.743	1988 1989
8	Erik Folk	42-57	.737	2009 2010
9	Don Martin	20-28	.714	1965 1966 1967
10	Ryan Perkins	22-31	.710	2007 2008

Single season
Rk	Player	FG-FGA	Pct	Year
1	Chuck Nelson	25-26	.962	1982
2	Travis Coons	15-16	.938	2013
3	Peyton Henry	19-21	.905	2019
4	Jeff Jaeger	23-26	.885	1985
5	Peyton Henry	19-22	.863	2022
6	Erik Folk	18-21	.857	2009
7	Cameron Van Winkle	20-24	.833	2014
8	Jeff Jaeger	19-23	.826	1986
9	Grady Gross	18-22	.818	2023
10	John McCallum	16-20	.800	1989
	Cameron Van Winkle	16-20	.800	2015
	Cameron Van Winkle	16-20	.800	2016

== See also ==
- List of Washington Huskies football seasons
