= 2011 Washington Huskies football team =

American college football season

2011 Washington Huskies football

Alamo Bowl, L 56–67 vs. Baylor
- Conference: Pac-12 Conference
- North Division
- Record: 7–6 (5–4 Pac-12)
- Head coach: Steve Sarkisian (3rd season)
- Offensive coordinator: Doug Nussmeier (3rd season)
- Offensive scheme: Pro-style
- Defensive coordinator: Nick Holt (3rd season)
- Base defense: 4–3
- MVPs: Cort Denninson; Greg Walker; Chris Polk
- Captains: Cort Denninson; Jermaine Kearse; Senio Kelemete; Alameda Ta'amu
- Home stadium: Husky Stadium

2011 Pac-12 Conference football standings
	Conf.			Overall
Team	W		L	W		L
North Division
No. 4 Oregon xy$	8	–	1	12	–	2
No. 7 Stanford x%	8	–	1	11	–	2
Washington	5	–	4	7	–	6
California	4	–	5	7	–	6
Oregon State	3	–	6	3	–	9
Washington State	2	–	7	4	–	8
South Division
No. 6 USC †	7	–	2	10	–	2
UCLA xy	5	–	4	6	–	8
Utah	4	–	5	8	–	5
Arizona State	4	–	5	6	–	7
Arizona	2	–	7	4	–	8
Colorado	2	–	7	3	–	10
Championship: Oregon 49, UCLA 31
$ – BCS representative as conference champion; % – BCS at-large representative; x – Division champion/co-champions; y – Championship game participant; † – USC ineligible for championship and postseason due to NCAA sanctions; Rankings from AP Poll

The 2011 Washington Huskies football team represented the University of Washington in the 2011 NCAA Division I FBS football season. The team was coached by third year head coach Steve Sarkisian. They played six of their home games at Husky Stadium and their final home game at CenturyLink Field due to a planned renovation of Husky Stadium; both stadiums are in Seattle. They are a member of the North Division of the Pac-12 Conference. They finished the season 7–6, 5–4 in Pac-12 play to finish in third place in the North division. They were invited to the Alamo Bowl where they were defeated by Baylor 67–56.

== Schedule ==
Date	Time	Opponent	Rank	Site	TV	Result	Attendance	Source
September 3	4:00 p.m.	Eastern Washington*		Husky Stadium; Seattle, WA	RTNW	W 30–27	58,088	
September 10	12:30 p.m.	Hawaii*		Husky Stadium; Seattle, WA	RTNW	W 40–32	63,252	
September 17	12:30 p.m.	at No. 11 Nebraska*		Memorial Stadium; Lincoln, NE	ABC/ESPN	L 38–51	85,110	
September 24	12:30 p.m.	California		Husky Stadium; Seattle, WA	FSN	W 31–23	60,437	
October 1	4:00 p.m.	at Utah		Rice–Eccles Stadium; Salt Lake City, UT	FSN	W 31–14	45,412	
October 15	12:30 p.m.	Colorado		Husky Stadium; Seattle, WA	RTNW	W 52–24	62,147	
October 22	5:00 p.m.	at No. 7 Stanford	No. 22	Stanford Stadium; Stanford, CA	ABC	L 21–65	50,360	
October 29	7:30 p.m.	Arizona^{†}		Husky Stadium; Seattle, WA	FSN	W 42–31	59,825	
November 5	7:30 p.m.	No. 6 Oregon		Husky Stadium; Seattle, WA (rivalry)	FSN	L 17–34	69,407	
November 12	12:30 p.m.	at No. 18 USC		Los Angeles Memorial Coliseum; Los Angeles, CA	FX	L 17–40	64,756	
November 19	12:30 p.m.	at Oregon State		Reser Stadium; Corvallis, OR	RTNW	L 21–38	42,766	
November 26	4:30 p.m.	Washington State		CenturyLink Field; Seattle, WA (Apple Cup)	Versus	W 38–21	64,559	
December 29	6:00 p.m.	vs. No. 15 Baylor*		Alamodome; San Antonio, TX (Alamo Bowl)	ESPN	L 56–67	65,256	
*Non-conference game; ^{†}Homecoming; Rankings from AP Poll released prior to the game; All times are in Pacific time; Source:

== Roster and coaching staff ==
2011 Washington Huskies football team roster
Players
Coaches
Offense

Pos.	#	Name	Class
WR	9	Devin Aguilar	Sr
FB	48	Jonathan Amosa	Jr
OL	70	James Atoe	RFr
TE	81	Marlion Barnett	So
FB	36	Travon Brooks	Fr
QB	6	Derrick Brown	Fr
WR	7	Cody Bruns	Sr
TB	24	Jesse Callier	So
WR	19	DiAndre Campbell	RFr
WR	27	William Chandler	So
OL	76	Dexter Charles	Fr
TB	32	Deontae Cooper	RFr
OL	78	Mike Criste	RFr
OL	62	Ross Dolbec	Fr
OL	67	Skyler Fancher	Sr
TB	26	Johri Fogerson	Sr
WR	16	Marvin Hall	Fr
TE	84	Michael Hartvigson	RFr
OL	72	Micah Hatchee	RFr
TE	80	Evan Hudson	RFr
WR	3	James Johnson	Jr
WR	11	Jamaal Jones	Fr
WR	15	Jermaine Kearse	Sr
OL	56	Senio Kelemete	Sr
OL	75	Erik Kohler	So
WR	83	Luther Leonard	Jr
WR	89	Reade Lobdill	Sr
QB	5	Nick Montana	RFr
WR	12	Joshua Perkins	Fr
TB/FB	34	Dezden Petty	Fr
TB	1	Chris Polk	Jr
OL	79	Colin Porter	So
QB	17	Keith Price	So
OL	59	Ben Riva	RFr
TB	35	Cole Sager	Jr
TE	87	Cameron Salley	So
TB	25	Bishop Sankey	Fr
OL	73	Drew Schaefer	Jr
TE	88	Austin Seferian-Jenkins	Fr
WR	8	Kevin Smith	So
QB	13	Wil Smith	Fr
OL	64	Colin Tanigawa	RFr
OL	61	Ben Teichman	Fr
OL	65	Siosifa Tufunga	Fr
QB	14	Thomas Vincent	Fr
WR	2	Kasen Williams	Fr
QB	16	Erik Wilson	So
TB	29	Willis Wilson	RFr
OL	52	Nick Wood	Sr

Defense

Pos.	#	Name	Class
S	36	Zach Beebe	RFr
DE	82	James Boker	Fr
DE	91	Connor Cree	Fr
DE	11	Talia Crichton	Jr
LB	31	Cort Dennison	Sr
CB	18	Greg Ducre	So
S	42	Ken Egu	RFr
S	41	Travis Feeney	Fr
S	29	Nate Fellner	Jr
DE	95	Jarett Finau	Fr
LB	37	Princeton Fuimaono	So
DE	85	Pete Galbraith	Sr
LB	53	Garret Gilliland	So
S	20	Justin Glenn	Jr
CB	26	Anthony Gobern	Jr
S	34	K.C. Herren	RFr
LB	50	Nick Holt	Fr
DE	93	Andrew Hudson	RFr
DE	52	Hau'oli Jamora	So
LB	58	Jamaal Kearse	RFr
LB	56	Alec Kimble	RFr
DL	97	Lawrence Lagafuaina	RFr
LB	47	Scott Lawyer	Fr
DB	27	Adam Long	Jr
LB	40	Matthew Lyons	Fr
S	1	Sean Parker	So
LB	43	Cooper Pelluer	So
CB	38	Marquis Persley	Sr
CB	21	Marcus Peters	Fr
DL	55	Sione Potoa'e	So
CB	28	Quinton Richardson	Sr
S	5	James Sample	Fr
DL	77	Drew Schultz	RFr
S	13	Will Shamburger	So
DL	71	Danny Shelton	Fr
DE	22	Josh Shirley	RFr
DB	4	Antavius Sims	Jr
S	14	Taz Stevenson	So
DL	74	Alameda Ta'amu	Sr
DE	72	Everrette Thompson	Sr
LB	10	John Timu	Fr
DL	98	Semisi Tokolahi	Jr
CB	6	Desmond Trufant	Jr
LB	54	Tim Tucker	So
DL	90	Taniela Tupou	Fr
LB	3	Thomas Tutogi	So
S	39	Greg Walker	Jr
LB	51	Jordan Wallace	Jr
DE	45	Corey Waller	Fr
CB	32	Tre Watson	Jr
S	30	Evan Zeger	Fr

Special teams

Pos.	#	Name	Class
PK	17	Erik Folk	Sr
PK	16	Eric Guttorp	Sr
LS	60	Brendon Lopez	Sr
P	46	Will Mahan	Sr
P	94	Kiel Rasp	Sr

Head coach

- Steve Sarkisian
  3rd season
  3rd year at Washington
  alma mater: BYU

Coordinators/assistant coaches

- Nick Holt
  3rd season as DC
  3rd year at Washington
  alma mater: Pacific
- Doug Nussmeier
  3rd season as OC/QB coach
  3rd year at Washington
  alma mater: Idaho
- Mike Cox
  3rd season as LB coach
  3rd year at Washington
  alma mater: Idaho
- Dan Cozzetto
  3rd season as Run Game Coordinator/OL coach
  3rd year at Washington
  alma mater: Idaho
- Jimmie Dougherty
  3rd season as WR coach
  3rd year at Washington
  alma mater: Missouri
- Demetrice Martin
  3rd season as Sec/CB coach
  3rd year at Washington
  alma mater: Excelsior College
- Jeff Mills
  3rd season as Sec/S coach
  3rd year at Washington
  alma mater: Western Washington
- Johnny Nansen
  3rd season as ST/DL coach
  3rd year at Washington
  alma mater: Washington State
- Joel Thomas
  3rd season as RB coach
  3rd year at Washington
  alma mater: Idaho
- Jordan Paopao
  1st season as GA coach
  1st year at Washington
  alma mater: San Diego
- Donte Williams
  1st season as GA coach
  1st year at Washington
  alma mater: Syracuse

Legend

- (C) Team captain
- (S) Suspended
- (I) Ineligible
- Injured
- Redshirt

Roster
Last update: August 17, 2011

== Game starters ==
The follow players were the game starters.

Opponent	WR	LT	LG	C	RG	RT	TE	QB	TB	FB	WR
EASTERN WASH.	Je. Kearse	Kelemete	Tanigawa	Schaefer	Porter	Kohler	Seferian-Jenkins	Price	Polk	Hartvigson%	Aguilar
HAWAI’I	Je. Kearse	Kelemete	Tanigawa	Schaefer	Porter	Kohler	Seferian-Jenkins	Price	Polk	Amosa	Hartvigson%
at Nebraska	Je. Kearse	Kelemete	Tanigawa	Schaefer	Porter	Kohler	Williams+	Price	Polk	Johnson+	Aguilar
CALIFORNIA	Je. Kearse	Kelemete	Tanigawa	Schaefer	Porter	Kohler	Seferian-Jenkins	Price	Polk	Amosa	- Hartvigson%
at Utah	Je. Kearse	Kelemete	Tanigawa	Schaefer	Porter	Kohler	Hartvigson	Price	Polk	Amosa	Johnson
COLORADO	Je. Kearse	Kelemete	Tanigawa	Schaefer	Porter	Kohler	Seferian-Jenkins	Price	Polk	Johnson+	Aguilar
at Stanford	Je. Kearse	Kelemete	Tanigawa	Schaefer	Porter	Kohler	Seferian-Jenkins	Price	Polk	Hartvigson%	Aguilar
ARIZONA	Je. Kearse	Kelemete	Tanigawa	Schaefer	Porter	Kohler	Seferian-Jenkins	Price	Polk	Johnson+	Aguilar
OREGON	Je. Kearse	Kelemete	Tanigawa	Schaefer	Porter	Kohler	Seferian-Jenkins	Price	Polk	Hartvigson%	E. Hudson%
at USC	Je. Kearse	Kelemete	Tanigawa	Schaefer	Porter	Kohler	Williams+	Price	Polk	Smith+	Aguilar
at Oregon State	Je. Kearse	Kelemete	Tanigawa	Schaefer	Porter	Kohler	Seferian-Jenkins	Montana	Polk	Williams+	Aguilar
WASHINGTON STATE	Je. Kearse	Kelemete	Wood	Schaefer	Porter	Kohler	Seferian-Jenkins	Price	Polk	Tucker	Smith
vs. Baylor	Je. Kearse	Kelemete	Wood	Schaefer	Porter	Kohler	Seferian-Jenkins	Price	Polk	Williams+	Aguilar

% – started as second/third tight end + – started as third/fourth wide receiver

Opponent	DE	DT	DT	DE	OLB	ILB	OLB	S	S	CB	CB
EASTERN WASH.	Crichton	Thompson	Ta’amu	Jamora	Fuimaono	Dennison	Timu	Fellner	Parker	Ducre	Trufant
HAWAI’I	Crichton	Thompson	Ta’amu	Jamora	Fuimaono	Dennison	Ducre^	Fellner	Parker	Richardson	Trufant
at Nebraska	Crichton	Thompson	Ta’amu	Jamora	Fuimaono	Dennison	Timu	Glenn	Parker	Richardson	Trufant
CALIFORNIA	Thompson	Potoa’e	Ta’amu	Jamora	Gilliland	Dennison	Timu	Glenn	Parker	Richardson	Trufant
at Utah	Thompson	Tokolahi	Ta’amu	Shirley	Fuimaono	Dennison	Ja. Kearse	Glenn	Parker	Ducre	Trufant
COLORADO	Thompson	Tokolahi	Ta’amu	Shirley	Fuimaono	Dennison	Ja. Kearse	Glenn	Parker	Ducre	Trufant
at Stanford	Thompson	Tokolahi	Ta’amu	Shirley	Fuimaono	Dennison	Ja. Kearse	Glenn	Parker	Ducre	Trufant
ARIZONA	Thompson	Tokolahi	Ta’amu	Shirley	Fuimaono	Dennison	Timu	Shamburger	Parker	Ducre	Trufant
OREGON	Thompson	Tokolahi	Ta’amu	Shirley	Fuimaono	Dennison	Timu	Shamburger	Parker	Richardson	Trufant
at USC	Thompson	Tokolahi	Ta’amu	A. Hudson	Fuimaono	Dennison	Timu	Shamburger	Parker	Richardson	Trufant
at Oregon State	Thompson	Tokolahi	Ta’amu	A. Hudson	Fuimaono	Dennison	Timu	Shamburger	Parker	Richardson	Trufant
WASHINGTON STATE	Thompson	Tokolahi	Ta’amu	Shirley	Fuimaono	Dennison	Timu	Fellner	Parker	Richardson	Trufant
vs. Baylor	Thompson	Shelton	Ta’amu	Shirley	Fuimaono	Dennison	Ja. Kearse	Fellner	Parker	Richardson	Trufant

^ – started as fifth defensive back

== Game summaries ==
=== Eastern Washington ===
	1	2	3	4	Total
Eagles	10	3	7	7	27
Huskies	7	13	7	3	30

Washington Husky cornerback Desmond Trufant intercepted a pass by Eastern Washington Eagles' quarterback Bo Levi Mitchell in the end zone with 29 seconds left to preserve a 30–27 win on September 3. Trufant wrestled the pass away from 6-foot-5 Eagles receiver Brandon Kaufman. Mitchell passed for 473 yards on the night, completed 39 of 69 passes, and had 3 touchdowns against 2 interceptions. For Washington, quarterback Keith Price threw three touchdown passes and completed 17 of 25 passes for 102 yards, and running back Chris Polk ran for 125 yards on 23 carries. Washington gained fewer total yards than Eastern Washington – 250 yards compared to 504 for the Eagles – but had zero turnovers while the Eagles gave up the ball four times. Trufant had forced another one of those turnovers during the first quarter; he stripped Matt Johnson on a punt return and created a short field for the Huskies that led to a 7-yard touchdown pass from Price to Jonathan Amosa.

After the game, the Pac-12 Conference named Trufant Pac-12 defensive player of week. Washington placekicker Erik Folk was named Pac-12 special teams player of the week. Polk was a perfect 3-for-3 on field goals during the game and all three of his field goals came from outside of 40 yards.

=== Hawaii ===
	1	2	3	4	Total
Warriors	0	14	6	12	32
Huskies	21	7	3	9	40

=== Nebraska ===
	1	2	3	4	Total
Huskies	7	10	0	21	38
#11 Cornhuskers	10	10	17	14	51

=== California ===
Team	1	2	3	4	Total
California	7	13	3	0	23
• Washington	14	7	3	7	31

- Date: September 24
- Location: Husky Stadium, Seattle
- Game start: 12:30 p.m. PDT

Scoring summary
1	10:00	CAL	Keenan Allen 90-yard pass from Zach Maynard (Giorgio Tavecchio kick)	CAL 7–0
1	8:39	WASH	Austin Seferian-Jenkins 20-yard pass from Keith Price (Erik Folk kick)	Tied 7–7
1	3:30	WASH	Chris Polk 2-yard run (Erik Folk kick)	WASH 14–7
2	12:57	CAL	Giorgio Tavecchio 29-yard field goal	WASH 14–10
2	8:51	WASH	Austin Seferian-Jenkins 20-yard pass from Keith Price (Erik Folk kick)	WASH 21–10
2	5:13	CAL	Giorgio Tavecchio 36-yard field goal	WASH 21–13
2	1:20	CAL	C.J. Anderson 1-yard run (Giorgio Tavecchio kick)	WASH 21–20
3	7:51	CAL	Giorgio Tavecchio 25-yard field goal	CAL 23–21
3	2:06	WASH	Erik Folk 40-yard field goal	WASH 24–23
4	12:13	WASH	Chris Polk 70-yard pass from Keith Price (Erik Folk kick)	WASH 31–23

=== Utah ===
	1	2	3	4	Total
Huskies	7	3	14	7	31
Utes	7	0	0	7	14

=== Colorado ===
Team	1	2	3	4	Total
Colorado	7	3	7	7	24
• Washington	21	17	7	7	52

- Date: October 15
- Location: Husky Stadium, Seattle
- Game start: 12:30 p.m. PDT

Scoring summary
1	12:16	WASH	Jermaine Kearse 17-yard pass from Keith Price (Erik Folk kick)	WASH 7–0
1	9:42	COL	Kyle Cefalo 5-yard pass from Tyler Hansen (Will Oliver kick)	Tied 7–7
1	6:47	WASH	Kevin Smith 22-yard run (Erik Folk kick)	WASH 14–7
1	0:00	WASH	Austin Seferian-Jenkins 11-yard pass from Keith Price (Erik Folk kick)	WASH 21–7
2	10:51	COL	Will Oliver 46-yard field goal	WASH 21–10
2	8:05	WASH	Chris Polk 14-yard pass from Keith Price (Erik Folk kick)	WASH 28–10
2	2:09	WASH	Devin Aguilar 4-yard pass from Keith Price (Erik Folk kick)	WASH 35–10
2	0:00	WASH	Erik Folk 41-yard field goal	WASH 38–10
3	10:45	COL	Tony Jones 2-yard run (Will Oliver kick)	WASH 38–17
3	2:48	WASH	Jesse Callier 26-yard run (Erik Folk kick)	WASH 45–17
4	13:34	COL	Tony Jones 1-yard run (Will Oliver kick)	WASH 45–24
4	2:32	WASH	Bishop Sankey 3-yard run (Eric Guttorp kick)	WASH 52–24

=== Stanford ===
	1	2	3	4	Total
#22 Huskies	7	7	0	7	21
#7 Cardinal	10	28	10	17	65

=== Arizona ===
	1	2	3	4	Total
Wildcats	10	3	15	3	31
Huskies	0	14	14	14	42

=== Oregon ===
	1	2	3	4	Total
#6 Ducks	10	7	17	0	34
Huskies	3	7	7	0	17

=== USC ===
	1	2	3	4	Total
Huskies	0	3	7	7	17
#18 Trojans	7	16	14	3	40

=== Oregon State ===
	1	2	3	4	Total
Huskies	7	7	0	7	21
Beavers	14	3	0	21	38

=== Washington State ===
Washington State at Washington

Team	1	2	3	4	Total
Washington State	0	14	7	0	21
• Washington	14	7	7	10	38

- Date: November 26
- Location: CenturyLink Field, Seattle
- Game start: 4:30 p.m. PST
- Game attendance: 64,559
- Television network: Versus

Scoring summary
1	11:37	WASH	Jesse Callier 2-yard blocked punt return (Erik Folk kick)	WASH 7–0
1	2:13	WASH	Kasen Williams 16-yard pass from Keith Price (Erik Folk kick)	WASH 14–0
2	7:55	WSU	Jared Karstetter 16-yard pass from Marshall Lobbestael (Andrew Furney kick)	WASH 14–7
2	2:05	WSU	Marquess Wilson 16-yard pass from Marshall Lobbestael (Andrew Furney kick)	Tied 14–14
2	0:24	WASH	Kasen Williams 21-yard pass from Keith Price (Erik Folk kick)	WASH 21–14
3	5:56	WASH	Chris Polk 22-yard pass from Keith Price (Erik Folk kick)	WASH 28–14
3	4:31	WSU	Marquess Wilson 38-yard pass from Marshall Lobbestael (Andrew Furney kick)	WASH 28–21
4	13:16	WASH	Erik Folk 46-yard field goal	WASH 31–21
4	5:23	WASH	Chris Polk 1-yard run (Erik Folk kick)	WASH 38–21

Keith Price threw three touchdown passes to become Washington's all-time single-season leader in that category, the final one a 22-yard toss to Chris Polk, and Washington held off rival Washington State 38–21 on Saturday night to win the 104th Apple Cup. Price threw his 29th touchdown pass of the season midway through the third quarter, finding Polk on a wheel-route out of the backfield to give the Huskies a 28–14 lead.

Washington State pulled within 28–21, but Erik Folk's 46-yard field goal early in the fourth quarter pushed the lead to 10 and Polk sealed the Huskies third straight Apple Cup title on his 1-yard TD run with 5:23 left.

Price, who sat out last week's loss at Oregon State due to a multitude of injuries, finished 21 of 29 for 291 yards. Washington also got a blocked punt that Jesse Callier returned 2 yards for a touchdown in the first quarter.

The Cougars fired head coach Paul Wulff the following week.

=== Baylor (Alamo Bowl) ===
	1	2	3	4	Total
Huskies	7	28	14	7	56
#15 Bears	21	3	29	14	67

Entering their first game in the Alamo Bowl, the Huskies has a 16–14–1 overall bowl game record, going back to their first game in the 1924 Rose Bowl. The Huskies set new school record during the season in passing touchdowns (32) and in fewest fumbles (11).

== Rankings ==
Ranking movements Legend: ██ Increase in ranking ██ Decrease in ranking — = Not ranked RV = Received votes
	Week															
Poll	Pre	1	2	3	4	5	6	7	8	9	10	11	12	13	14	Final
AP	RV	—	RV	—	RV	RV	RV	22	RV	RV	RV	RV	—	—	—	—
Coaches	RV	RV	RV	RV	RV	RV	RV	24	RV	RV	RV	—	—	—	—	—
Harris	Not released						RV	25	RV	RV	RV	—	—	—	—	Not released
BCS	Not released							25	—	—	—	—	—	—	—	Not released
