= 2010 Washington Huskies football team =

American college football season

2010 Washington Huskies football

Holiday Bowl champion

Holiday Bowl, W 19–7 vs. Nebraska
- Conference: Pacific-10 Conference
- Record: 7–6 (5–4 Pac-10)
- Head coach: Steve Sarkisian (2nd season)
- Offensive coordinator: Doug Nussmeier (2nd season)
- Offensive scheme: Pro-style
- Defensive coordinator: Nick Holt (2nd season)
- Base defense: 4–3
- Captains: Jake Locker; Senio Kelemete; Mason Foster; Nate Williams
- Home stadium: Husky Stadium (Capacity: 72,500)

2010 Pacific-10 Conference football standings
	Conf.			Overall
Team	W		L	W		L
No. 3 Oregon $	9	–	0	12	–	1
No. 4 Stanford %	8	–	1	12	–	1
USC †	5	–	4	8	–	5
Washington	5	–	4	7	–	6
Arizona	4	–	5	7	–	6
Arizona State	4	–	5	6	–	6
Oregon State	4	–	5	5	–	7
California	3	–	6	5	–	7
UCLA	2	–	7	4	–	8
Washington State	1	–	8	2	–	10
$ – BCS representative as conference champion; % – BCS at-large representative; † – USC ineligible for championship and post-season due to NCAA sanctions; Rankings from AP Poll

The 2010 Washington Huskies football team represented the University of Washington in the 2010 NCAA Division I FBS football season. Led by second-year head coach Steve Sarkisian, the Huskies played their home games on campus at Husky Stadium in Seattle and were members of the Pacific-10 Conference.

Washington compiled a 6–6 record in the regular season (5–4 in Pac-10, tied for third), and were invited to their first bowl game in eight years. At the Holiday Bowl in San Diego, they upset favored Nebraska 19–7 to finish on a four-game winning streak at 7–6.

== Preseason ==
Quarterback Jake Locker, a Heisman hopeful, decided to return to Washington in 2010 as a fifth-year senior. In 2009, he passed for 2,800 yards and 21 touchdowns. Had Locker decided to enter the 2010 NFL draft after his junior year, many draft analysts predicted he would have been a top five pick.

Sophomore running back Chris Polk was primed for another 1,000-yard rushing season. In 2009, Polk had 1,113 yards, averaging 4.9 yards per carry, and scored five touchdowns. Polk surpassed 100 yards rushing in four of the final five games of the season, just missing in the season finale against California (94 yards).

== Schedule ==
Date	Time	Opponent	Site	TV	Result	Attendance	Source
September 4	4:00 p.m.	at BYU*	LaVell Edwards Stadium; Provo, UT	CBSCS	L 17–23	63,771	
September 11	4:00 p.m.	Syracuse*	Husky Stadium; Seattle, WA	FSNNW	W 41–20	62,418	
September 18	12:30 p.m.	No. 8 Nebraska*	Husky Stadium; Seattle, WA	ABC/ESPN2	L 21–56	72,876	
October 2	5:00 p.m.	at No. 18 USC	Los Angeles Memorial Coliseum; Los Angeles, CA	ESPN2	W 32–31	82,796	
October 9	7:00 p.m.	Arizona State	Husky Stadium; Seattle, WA	FSNNW	L 14–24	65,685	
October 16	7:15 p.m.	Oregon State^{†}	Husky Stadium; Seattle, WA	ESPN	W 35–34 ^{2OT}	65,235	
October 23	7:15 p.m.	at No. 18 Arizona	Arizona Stadium; Tucson, AZ	ESPN	L 14–44	56,244	
October 30	4:00 p.m.	No. 13 Stanford	Husky Stadium; Seattle, WA	Versus	L 0–41	69,020	
November 6	12:30 p.m.	at No. 1 Oregon	Autzen Stadium; Eugene, OR (rivalry)	ABC/ESPN2	L 16–53	60,017	
November 18	5:00 p.m.	UCLA	Husky Stadium; Seattle, WA	ESPN	W 24–7	62,347	
November 27	12:30 p.m.	at California	California Memorial Stadium; Berkeley, CA	FSNNW	W 16–13	44,613	
December 4	4:00 p.m.	at Washington State	Martin Stadium; Pullman, WA (Apple Cup)	Versus	W 35–28	30,157	
December 30	7:00 p.m.	vs. No. 17 Nebraska*	Qualcomm Stadium; San Diego, CA (Holiday Bowl)	ESPN	W 19–7	57,921	
*Non-conference game; ^{†}Homecoming; Rankings from AP Poll released prior to the game; All times are in Pacific time

== Game summaries ==
=== BYU ===
	1	2	3	4	Total
Huskies	7	10	0	0	17
Cougars	5	8	10	0	23

=== Syracuse ===
	1	2	3	4	Total
Orange	10	0	0	10	20
Huskies	3	10	14	14	41

=== Nebraska ===
	1	2	3	4	Total
#8 Cornhuskers	14	14	21	7	56
Huskies	7	7	7	0	21

This will be the 8th time these teams have met for non-conference play, with the series currently tied at 3-3-1. Nebraska owns the overall scoring edge at 146-109, and also the last victory, a 55-7 triumph in front of a sold-out home stadium crowd in 1998. This is the start of a home and home series with the Huskies visiting Nebraska next year at Memorial Stadium.

=== USC ===
	1	2	3	4	Total
Huskies	3	17	3	9	32
Trojans	7	14	7	3	31

Washington upset 18th-ranked USC for the second consecutive season, winning at the Los Angeles Memorial Coliseum on a last-second 30-yard field goal.

Erik Folk, who hit the game-winning field goal, was named Pac-10 special teams player of the week. He went 4-for-4 field goals and two PAT attempts. Folk kicked a 22-yarder to defeat the Trojans 16-13 the previous season.

=== Arizona State ===
	1	2	3	4	Total
Sun Devils	14	7	0	3	24
Huskies	7	0	0	7	14

=== Oregon State ===
	1	2	3	4	OT	2OT	Total
Beavers	0	14	7	0	7	6	34
Huskies	7	14	0	0	7	7	35

Jake Locker threw a career-high five touchdown passes, two in overtime to Jermaine Kearse, and the Huskies stopped the Beavers 2-point conversion in double overtime to keep their bowl hopes alive.

Chris Polk ran for 105 yards on 25 carries for the Huskies.

Beavers running back Jacquizz Rodgers ran for 140 yards on 32 carries and three touchdowns. He also caught four passes for 49 yards and a 10-yard TD catch in the first overtime. The Beavers were playing their first game since Rodgers' brother, James, was lost for the season because of a serious knee injury.

The game came down to the Beavers final possession in the second overtime. On 4th down from the UW 4-yard line, Beaver quarterback Ryan Katz's pass for John Reese fell to the turf in the end zone. The Huskies stormed the field, only then to realize a late flag from back judge Johnny Jenkins was for pass interference against the Huskies' Desmond Trufant.

Jacquizz Rodgers then scored from the 2 on the next play to pull Oregon State to 35-34. Beavers coach Mike Riley called timeout and decided to go for two. But Katz's throw fell out of Joe Halahuni's hands as he was hit by linebacker Cort Dennison and Washington's celebration was on again.

Washington snapped a six-game losing streak to the Beavers.

=== Arizona ===
	1	2	3	4	Total
Huskies	7	7	0	0	14
#18 Wildcats	10	20	7	7	44

=== Stanford ===
	1	2	3	4	Total
#14 Cardinal	14	14	10	3	41
Huskies	0	0	0	0	0

=== Oregon ===
	1	2	3	4	Total
Huskies	0	6	10	0	16
#1 Ducks	0	18	21	14	53

=== UCLA ===
	1	2	3	4	Total
Bruins	7	0	0	0	7
Huskies	0	7	3	14	24

=== California ===
Team	1	2	3	4	Total
• Washington	0	0	10	6	16
California	0	3	7	3	13

- Date: November 27
- Location: California Memorial Stadium, Berkeley, CA
- Game start: 3:30 p.m. EST

Scoring summary
2	0:00	CAL	Giorgio Tavecchio 53-yard field goal	CAL 3-0
3	10:22	WASH	D'Andre Goodwin 80-yard pass from Jake Locker (Erik Folk kick)	WASH 7-3
3	3:34	CAL	Cameron Jordan 21-yard fumble return (Giorgio Tavecchio kick)	CAL 10-7
3	0:08	WASH	Erik Folk 37-yard field goal	Tied 10-10
4	10:53	CAL	Giorgio Tavecchio 47-yard field goal	CAL 13-10
4	0:00	WASH	Chris Polk 1-yard run (no kick)	WASH 16-13

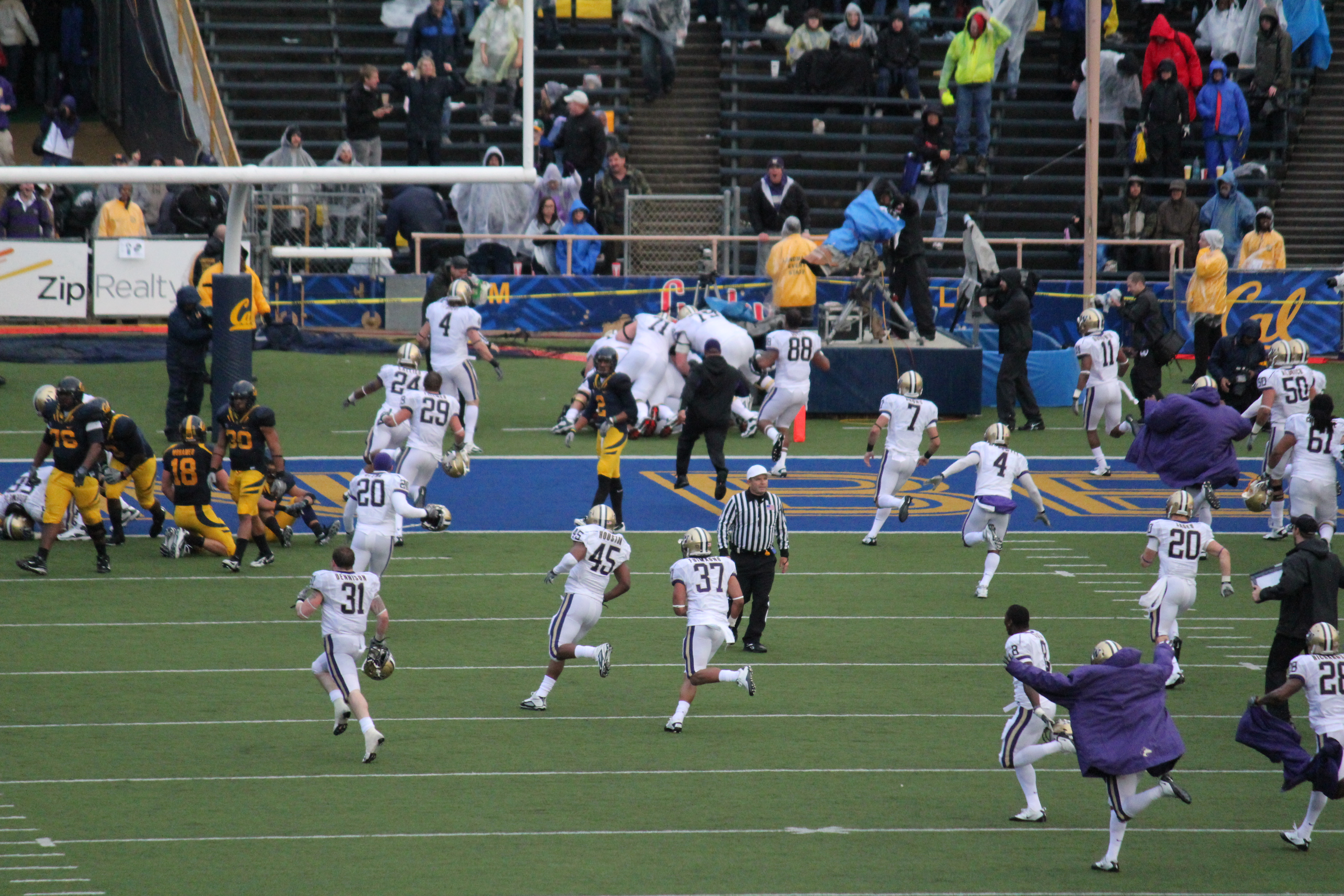
Washington players rush the field after running back Chris Polk's game-winning touchdown.

Washington scored from the one-yard line without time left in the regulation to defeat Cal and took the Golden Bears out of a bowl game. Chris Polk ran the ball in. Giorgio Tavecchio kicked two field goals for Cal, 53 yards and 47 yards.

For Washington, D'Andre Goodwin scored on an 80-yard pass from Jake Locker and Erik Folk kicked a 37-yard field goal. Cal scored a touchdown in the third quarter when Cameron Jordan took a fumble into the end zone for 21 yards.

=== Washington State ===
	1	2	3	4	Total
Huskies	7	7	7	14	35
Cougars	0	7	7	14	28

Chris Polk rushed 29 times for a career-high 284 yards and two touchdowns. The win gave the Huskies a 6-6 record on the season, sending Washington to a bowl game for the first time since the 2002 Sun Bowl.

=== Nebraska (Holiday Bowl) ===
	1	2	3	4	Total
#16 Cornhuskers	0	7	0	0	7
Huskies	10	0	7	2	19

This was the second time this season that the Huskies played Nebraska, with the first meeting ending in a 56-21 win for the Cornhuskers. Washington shocked Nebraska despite a poor game from Jake Locker.

== Rankings ==
Ranking movements Legend: ██ Increase in ranking ██ Decrease in ranking — = Not ranked RV = Received votes
	Week															
Poll	Pre	1	2	3	4	5	6	7	8	9	10	11	12	13	14	Final
AP	RV	—	—	—	—	—	—	—	—	—	—	—	—	—	—	—
Coaches	RV	RV	RV	—	—	—	—	—	—	—	—	—	—	—	—	RV
Harris	Not released						—	—	—	—	—	—	—	—	—	Not released
BCS	Not released							—	—	—	—	—	—	—	—	Not released

== Roster ==
No.	Name	Pos.	Ht.	Wt.	Yr Exp	Hometown/Last School
1	Sean Parker	S	5-10	200	FR-HS	Los Angeles, Calif./Narbonne
1	Chris Polk	TB	5-11	214	SO-1V	Redlands, Calif./East Valley
3	James Johnson	WR	6-0	201	SO-1V	Valley Center, Calif./Valley Center
4	Chris Izbicki	TE	6-3	246	JR-1V	Kirkland, Wash./Lake Washington
4	Vonzell McDowell, Jr	CB	5-9	183	SR-3V	Kent, Wash./Rainier Beach
5	Anthony Boyles	CB	6-3	203	SO-SQ	Compton, Calif./Junipero Serra
5	Nick Montana	QB	6-3	191	FR-HS	Thousand Oaks, Calif./Oaks Christian
6	Desmond Trufant	CB	6-0	177	SO-1V	Tacoma, Wash./Wilson
7	Cody Bruns	WR	5-11	177	JR-2V	Prosser, Wash./Prosser
7	Anthony Gobern	CB	5-11	189	SO-1V	Fair Oaks, Calif./Del Campo
8	Kevin Smith	WR	6-0	197	FR-HS	Compton, Calif./Centennial
8	Nate Williams	S	6-0	215	SR-3V	Renton, Wash./Kennedy
9	Devin Aguilar	WR	6-0	188	JR-2V	Denver, Colo./Mullen
9	Taz Stevenson	S	6-0	198	FR-HS	Mililani, Hawai'i/Mililani
10	Jake Locker	QB	6-3	230	SR-2V	Ferndale, Wash./Ferndale
11	Talia Crichton	DE	6-3	246	SO-1V	Lakewood, Calif./Lakewood
11	D'Andre Goodwin	WR	5-11	188	SR-3V	Pacoima, Calif./Antelope Valley
12	Luther Leonard	WR	6-2	195	SO-SQ	Seattle, Wash./Evergreen
13	Mike King	QB	6-1	204	FR-HS	Aberdeen, Wash./Weatherwax
13	Will Shamburger	S	6-0	190	RS FR-HS	Compton, Calif./St. John Bosco
15	Victor Burnett	LB	5-11	232	FR-HS	Los Angeles, Calif./Culver City
15	Jermaine Kearse	WR	6-2	205	JR-2V	Lakewood, Wash./Lakes
16	Eric Guttorp	PK	5-7	170	JR-SQ	Seattle, Wash./Nathan Hale
16	Erik Wilson	QB	6-0	178	RS FR-HS	Redondo Beach, Calif./Redondo Union
17	Erik Folk	PK	5-11	197	JR-1V	Woodland Hills, Calif./Notre Dame
17	Keith Price	QB	6-1	192	RS FR-HS	Compton, Calif./St. John Bosco
18	Riley Weik	PK	6-0	173	FR-HS	Seattle, Wash./Seattle Prep
18	Marlion Barnett	TE	6-2	215	RS FR-HS	Corona, Calif./Santiago
18	Gregory Ducre	CB	5-10	170	FR-HS	Los Angeles, Calif./Crenshaw
19	DiAndre Campbell	WR	6-1	182	FR-HS	Oakland, Calif./Oakland Tech
20	Justin Glenn	S	5-11	203	SO-1V	Mukilteo, Wash./Kamiak
20	Cole Sager	TB	5-10	196	SO-1V	Burlington, Wash./Burlington-Edison
21	Joey DeRitis	TB	5-11	207	FR-HS	Seattle, Wash./Seattle Prep
21	Jordan Wallace	LB	6-0	225	SO-1V	Sacramento, Calif./Grant
22	Demitrius Bronson	TB	5-10	228	SO-1V	Kent, Wash./Kentwood
22	Josh Shirley	DE/LB	6-3	225	FR-HS	Fontana, Calif./Kaiser
23	Laroy Chase	DB	5-11	163	SO-HS	Tacoma, Wash./Lincoln
23	Johri Fogerson	TB	6-1	207	JR-2V	Kent, Wash./O'Dea
24	Jesse Callier	TB	5-10	205	FR-HS	Downey, Calif./Warren
25	Jamaal Kearse	LB	6-2	230	FR-HS	Lakewood, Wash./Lakes
27	William Chandler	WR	6-0	184	RS FR-HS	Sammamish, Wash./Skyline
27	Adam Long	CB	5-10	168	SO-1V	Los Angeles, Calif./St. Bernard
28	Quinton Richardson	CB	6-0	200	JR-2V	Renton, Wash./O'Dea
29	Nate Fellner	S	6-1	201	SO-1V	Fresno, Calif./Clovis West
29	Willis Wilson	TB	5-9	178	FR-HS	Lakewood, Wash./Lakes
30	Zach Fogerson	FB	6-0	238	FR-HS	Kent, Wash./O'Dea
31	Cort Dennison	LB	6-1	236	JR-2V	Salt Lake City, Utah/Judge Memorial
32	Deontae Cooper	TB	6-0	193	FR-HS	Perris, Calif./Citrus Hill
34	Tim Tucker	LB	6-1	221	RS FR-HS	Harbor City, Calif./Narbonne
35	Garret Gilliland	LB	6-0	215	FR-HS	Anaheim, Calif./Orange Lutheran
36	Zach Beebe	SS	6-1	211	FR-HS	Sultan, Wash./Sultan
37	Princeton Fuimaono	LB	6-0	201	FR-HS	Long Beach, Calif./Long Beach Jordan
38	Marquis Persley	S	6-0	188	JR-1V	Redlands, Calif./East Valley
39	Greg Walker	S	5-10	194	SO-1V	Bellflower, Calif./St. Bernard
40	Mason Foster	LB	6-2	242	SR-3V	Seaside, Calif./Seaside
41	Victor Aiyewa	LB	6-1	219	SR-2V	Fresno, Texas/Hightower
41	Tobias Togi	FB	5-11	239	JR-SQ	Seattle, Wash./Evergreen
42	Ken Egu	FS	5-10	181	FR-HS	San Francisco, Calif./De La Salle
42	Kimo Makaula	FB	6-2	229	RS FR-HS	Kailua, Hawai'i/Punahou
43	Cooper Pelluer	LB	6-3	221	FR-HS	Sammamish, Wash./Skyline
45	Matt Houston	LB	6-0	235	SR-2V	Goleta, Calif./Dos Pueblos
45	Anthony Tokunaga	WR	5-11	180	RS FR-HS	Honolulu, Hawai'i/Kamehameha
46	Will Mahan	P	5-11	200	SR-1V	Bakersfield, Calif./Bakersfield College
47	Austin Sylvester	FB	6-1	248	SR-2V	Reno, Nev./Bishop Manogue/The Hun (N.J.)
48	Jonathan Amosa	LB	5-11	223	SO-SQ	Seattle, Wash./Rainier Beach
49	Ryan McLoughlin	S	5-11	195	FR-HS	San Diego, Calif./Cathedral Catholic
50	Kalani Aldrich	DE	6-7	250	JR-1V	Hilo, Hawaii/Kamehameha-Hawaii
51	Mykenna Ikehara	OL	6-2	265	SO-1V	Mililani, Hawai'i/Kamehameha
52	Hau'oli Jamora	DE	6-3	238	FR-HS	Laie, Hawai'i/Kahuku
52	Nick Wood	OL	6-3	287	JR-1V	Poway, Calif./Poway
53	Pete Galbraith	DE	6-1	250	JR-SQ	Deming, Wash./Mount Baker
54	Brandon Huppert	LB	6-1	232	SR-1V	Edmonds, Wash./Edmonds-Woodway
55	Sione Potoa'e	DT	6-2	285	FR-HS	Fort Lewis, Wash./Lakes
56	Senio Kelemete	OT	6-4	289	JR-2V	Seattle, Wash./Evergreen
56	Alec Kimble	LB	6-3	211	FR-HS	Sammamish, Wash./Eastside Catholic
59	Ben Riva	OL	6-6	275	FR-HS	Seattle, Wash./O'Dea
60	Brendan Lopez	LS	6-0	226	JR-SQ	Bellevue, Wash./Michigan
61	Gregory Christine	OL	6-2	288	SR-1V	Camarillo, Calif./St. Bonaventure
63	Daniel Kanczugowski	OL	6-4	327	SO-SQ	Edmonds, Wash./O'Dea
64	Colin Tanigawa	OL	6-3	310	FR-HS	Pasadena, Calif./Loyola
65	Ryan Tolar	OL	6-5	296	SR-3V	Pasco, Wash./Pasco
67	Skyler Fancher	OT	6-5	303	JR-1V	Costa Mesa, Calif./Huntington Beach
68	Derek Weston	OL	6-3	263	FR-HS	Maple Valley, Wash./Seattle Christian/Tahoma
70	James Atoe	OL	6-6	355	FR-HS	The Dalles, Ore./The Dalles-Wahtonka
71	Cody Habben	OT	6-6	290	SR-3V	Sammamish, Wash./Skyline
72	Micah Hatchie	OL	6-5	274	FR-HS	Haleiwa, Hawai'i/Waialua
73	Drew Schaefer	C	6-4	281	SO-1V	Sammamish, Wash./Eastlake
74	Alameda Ta'amu	DT	6-3	330	JR-2V	Kent, Wash./Rainier Beach
75	Erik Kohler	OL	6-5	306	FR-HS	Camarillo, Calif./Oaks Christian
77	Drew Schultz	DL	6-1	241	FR-HS	Olympia, Wash./Olympia
78	Mike Criste	OL	6-5	280	FR-HS	Mission Viejo, Calif./Mission Viejo
79	Colin Porter	OL	6-4	307	FR-HS	Bothell, Wash./Bothell
80	Evan Hudson	TE	6-6	251	FR-HS	Bothell, Wash./Bothell
81	Din Kuses	WR	6-1	188	RS FR-HS	Edmonds, Wash./Edmonds-Woodway
82	Jordan Polk	WR	5-8	161	JR-2V	Portland, Ore./Lincoln
84	Michael Hartvigson	TE	6-6	246	FR-HS	Bothell, Wash./Bothell
85	Marek Domanski	TE	6-5	248	SO-SQ	Seattle, Wash./Shorecrest
86	Peter Becker	LS	6-5	228	SO-SQ	Issaquah, Wash./Liberty
87	Peter Follmer	DL	6-5	236	SR-HS	Kent, Wash./Kentridge
88	Dorson Boyce	FB	6-2	228	SR-1V	New York, N.Y./Allan Hancock College
90	Chris Robinson	DT	6-0	258	RS FR-HS	Tustin, Calif./Tustin
92	Everrette Thompson	DE	6-6	244	JR-2V	Renton, Wash./Kennedy
93	Andrew Hudson	DE	6-3	231	FR-HS	Redlands, Cailf./Redlands East Valley
94	Kiel Rasp	P	6-3	215	JR-SQ	Seattle, Wash./Nathan Hale
95	Evan Steinruck	P	6-3	217	RS JR-HS	Lake Stevens, Wash./Lake Stevens
96	De'Shon Matthews	DL	6-4	253	SR-2V	Sacramento, Calif./Laguna Creek
97	Lawrence Lagafuaina	DT	6-0	344	FR-HS	Aiea, Hawai'i/Aiea, Hawai'i
98	Semisi Tokolahi	DT	6-2	297	SO-1V	Hilo, Hawai'i/Hilo
99	Cameron Elisara	DL	6-3	269	SR-2V	Spokane, Wash./Ferris

== Game starters ==
The follow players were the game starters.

Opponent	WR	LT	LG	C	RG	RT	TE	QB	TB	FB	WR
at BYU	Aguilar	Kelemete	Tolar	Schaefer	Christine	Habben	Goodwin%	Locker	C. Polk	Sylvester	Kearse
SYRACUSE	Aguilar	Kelemete	Tolar	Schaefer	Christine	Habben	Izbicki	Locker	C. Polk	Sylvester	Kearse
NEBRASKA	Aguilar	Kelemete	Kohler	Schaefer	Tolar	Habben	Barnett	Locker	C. Polk	Sylvester	Kearse
at USC	Aguilar	Kelemete	Kohler	Schaefer	Tolar	Habben	Johnson%	Locker	C. Polk	Sylvester	Kearse
ARIZONA STATE	J. Polk	Kelemete	Christine	Schaefer	Tolar	Habben	Barnett	Locker	C. Polk	Goodwin%	Kearse
OREGON STATE	Goodwin	Kelemete	Tolar	Christine	Porter	Schaefer	Johnson%	Locker	C. Polk	Callier	Kearse
at Arizona	Goodwin	Kelemete	Tolar	Christine	Porter	Schaefer	Bruns%	Locker	C. Polk	J. Polk%	Kearse
STANFORD	Goodwin	Kelemete	Tolar	Schaefer	Porter	Kohler	Barnett	Locker	C. Polk	Callier	Kearse
at Oregon	Domanski^	Kelemete	Tolar	Schaefer	Christine	Habben	Barnett	Price	C. Polk	Sylvester	Kearse
UCLA	Aguilar	Kelemete	Tolar	Schaefer	Christine	Habben	Smith%	Locker	C. Polk	Goodwin%	Kearse
at Cal	Smith	Kelemete	Kohler	Schaefer	Porter	Habben	Kanczugowski	Locker	C. Polk	Sylvester	Kearse
at Washington State	Goodwin	Kelemete	Kohler	Schaefer	Porter	Habben	Kanczugowski	Locker	C. Polk	Callier	Kearse
vs. Nebraska (Bowl)	Goodwin	Kelemete	Tolar	Schaefer	Porter	Habben	Kanczugowski	Locker	C. Polk	Callier	Kearse

% - started as third or fourth wide receiver ^ - started as second tight end

Opponent	DE	DT	DT	DE	OLB	ILB	OLB	S	S	CB	CB
at BYU	Thompson	Ta'amu	Elisara	Crichton	Foster	Dennison	Aiyewa	Fellner	Williams	Trufant	Richardson
SYRACUSE	Thompson	Ta'amu	Elisara	Crichton	Foster	Dennison	Aiyewa	Fellner	Williams	Trufant	Richardson
NEBRASKA	Thompson	Ta'amu	Elisara	Crichton	Foster	Gilliland	Aiyewa	Fellner	Williams	Trufant	Richardson
at USC	Elisara	Ta'amu	Thompson	Crichton	Foster	Dennison	Aiyewa	Fellner	Williams	Trufant	Richardson
ARIZONA STATE	Matthews	Ta'amu	Thompson	Crichton	Foster	Dennison	Aiyewa	Fellner	Williams	Trufant	Richardson
OREGON STATE	Elisara	Ta'amu	Thompson	Crichton	Foster	Dennison	Aiyewa	Fellner	Williams	Trufant	Richardson
at Arizona	Elisara	Ta'amu	Thompson	Jamora	Foster	Dennison	Fuimaono	Fellner	Williams	Trufant	Richardson
STANFORD	Thompson	Ta'amu	Potoa'e	Jamora	Foster	Dennison	Aiyewa	Fellner	Williams	Trufant	Richardson
at Oregon	Thompson	Ta'amu	Potoa'e	Jamora	Foster	Dennison	Aiyewa	Fellner	Williams	Trufant	Richardson
UCLA	Thompson	Ta'amu	Tokolahi	Jamora	Foster	Dennison	Aiyewa	Fellner	Williams	Trufant	Richardson
at Cal	Thompson	Ta'amu	Tokolahi	Jamora	Foster	Dennison	Aiyewa	Fellner	Williams	Trufant	Richardson
at Washington State	Thompson	Ta’amu	Tokolahi	Jamora	Foster	Dennison	Aiyewa	Fellner	Williams	Trufant	Richardson
vs. Nebraska (Bowl)	Matthews	Ta’amu	Thompson	Jamora	Foster	Dennison	Aiyewa	Fellner	Williams	Trufant	Richardson

== Awards and honors ==
- October 4 - Erik Folk, who hit a 32-yard game-winning field goal to beat the 18th-ranked Trojans, was named Pac-10 Special Teams player of the week.
- December 1 - Linebacker Mason Foster, the Pac-10 conference's leading tackler, was named a first-team all-American by Scout.com
- December 6 - Tailback Chris Polk named Pac-10 Offensive Player of the Week
- December 7 - Linebacker Mason Foster was again awarded for his outstanding performance during the 2010 season when he was named to the 2010 All-Pac-10 first team
- December 8 - For the second time this season standout Husky Mason Foster was named a first-team all-American, this time by Rivals.com
- December 9 - Junior wide receiver Jermaine Kearse was named to the Rivals.com All-Pac-10 first-team
- December 20 - Senior QB Jake Locker was named honorable mention all-America by Pro Football Weekly

== NFL draft ==
Two Huskies were selected in the 2011 NFL draft, which lasted seven rounds (254 selections).

Player	Position	Round	Overall	Franchise
Jake Locker	QB	1st	8	Tennessee Titans
Mason Foster	LB	3rd	84	Tampa Bay Buccaneers

Locker was the first Husky selected in the first round in seven years.
