= 2012 Washington Huskies football team =

American college football season

2012 Washington Huskies football

Maaco Bowl Las Vegas, L 26–28 vs. Boise State
- Conference: Pac-12 Conference
- North Division
- Record: 7–6 (5–4 Pac-12)
- Head coach: Steve Sarkisian (4th season)
- Offensive coordinator: Eric Kiesau (1st season)
- Offensive scheme: Pro-style
- Defensive coordinator: Justin Wilcox (1st season)
- Base defense: 4–3
- Captains: S Sean Parker; QB Keith Price; C Drew Schaefer; CB Desmond Trufant; LB John Timu
- Home stadium: CenturyLink Field

2012 Pac-12 Conference football standings
	Conf.			Overall
Team	W		L	W		L
North Division
No. 7 Stanford xy$	8	–	1	12	–	2
No. 2 Oregon x%	8	–	1	12	–	1
No. 20 Oregon State	6	–	3	9	–	4
Washington	5	–	4	7	–	6
California	2	–	7	3	–	9
Washington State	1	–	8	3	–	9
South Division
UCLA xy	6	–	3	9	–	5
Arizona State	5	–	4	8	–	5
USC	5	–	4	7	–	6
Arizona	4	–	5	8	–	5
Utah	3	–	6	5	–	7
Colorado	1	–	8	1	–	11
Championship: Stanford 27, UCLA 24
$ – BCS representative as conference champion; % – BCS at-large representative; x – Division champion/co-champions; y – Championship game participant; Rankings from AP Poll

The 2012 Washington Huskies football team represented the University of Washington in the 2012 NCAA Division I FBS football season. The team, coached by fourth-year head coach Steve Sarkisian, was a member of the North Division of the Pac-12 Conference. The Huskies played their home games at CenturyLink Field in Seattle due to renovations at their normal on-campus home of Husky Stadium, also in Seattle. They finished the season 7–6, 5–4 in Pac-12 play to finish in fourth place in the North Division. They were invited to the Maaco Bowl Las Vegas where they were defeated by Boise State.

== Offseason ==
Following the Alamo Bowl coach Sarkisian fired nearly all of his defensive coaches, deciding to retain only defensive line coach/special teams coordinator Johnny Nansen. Shortly thereafter, offensive coordinator Doug Nussmeier left the program to accept a similar position at Alabama. Sarkisian filled his defensive staff with Justin Wilcox as defensive coordinator, Peter Sirmon as linebackers coach, Tosh Lupoi as defensive line coach, and Keith Heyward as defensive backs coach. He filled the open offensive coordinator position with former Cal assistant Eric Kiesau. Junior offensive lineman Colin Porter, who had started 19 games in two seasons, was forced to retire from football due to degenerative arthritis in both of his shoulders.

== Schedule ==
Date	Time	Opponent	Rank	Site	TV	Result	Attendance
September 1	7:30 p.m.	San Diego State*		CenturyLink Field; Seattle, WA	P12N	W 21–12	53,742
September 8	4:00 p.m.	at No. 3 LSU*		Tiger Stadium; Baton Rouge, LA	ESPN	L 3–41	92,804
September 15	1:00 p.m.	Portland State*		CenturyLink Field; Seattle, WA	FX	W 52–13	54,922
September 27	6:00 p.m.	No. 8 Stanford		CenturyLink Field; Seattle, WA	ESPN	W 17–13	55,941
October 6	7:30 p.m.	at No. 2 Oregon	No. 23	Autzen Stadium; Eugene, OR (rivalry)	ESPN	L 21–52	58,792
October 13	4:00 p.m.	No. 13 USC		CenturyLink Field; Seattle, WA	FOX	L 14–24	66,202
October 20	7:00 p.m.	at Arizona		Arizona Stadium; Tucson, AZ	P12N	L 17–52	50,148
October 27	7:15 p.m.	No. 7 Oregon State^{†}		CenturyLink Field; Seattle, WA	P12N	W 20–17	60,842
November 2	6:00 p.m.	at California		California Memorial Stadium; Berkeley, CA	ESPN2	W 21–13	42,226
November 10	7:30 p.m.	Utah		CenturyLink Field; Seattle, WA	P12N	W 34–15	60,050
November 17	10:30 a.m.	at Colorado	No. 25	Folsom Field; Boulder, CO	FX	W 38–3	43,148
November 23	12:30 p.m.	at Washington State	No. 25	Martin Stadium; Pullman, WA (Apple Cup)	FOX	L 28–31 ^{OT}	30,544
December 22	12:30 p.m.	vs. No. 20 Boise State*		Sam Boyd Stadium; Whitney, NV (Maaco Bowl Las Vegas)	ESPN	L 26–28	33,217
*Non-conference game; ^{†}Homecoming; Rankings from AP Poll released prior to the game; All times are in Pacific time

== Rankings ==
Ranking movements Legend: ██ Increase in ranking ██ Decrease in ranking — = Not ranked RV = Received votes
	Week															
Poll	Pre	1	2	3	4	5	6	7	8	9	10	11	12	13	14	Final
AP	RV	RV	—	—	—	23	—	—	—	—	—	RV	RV	—	—	
Coaches	RV	RV	RV	RV	RV	RV	—	—	—	—	—	RV	RV	—	—	
Harris	Not released						—	—	—	—	—	RV	RV	RV	—	Not released
BCS	Not released							—	—	—	—	25	25	—	—	Not released

== Weekly starters ==
The following players were the weekly offensive and defensive game starters.

Opponent	WR	LT	LG	C	RG	RT	TE	QB	TB	FB	WR
San Diego State	Williams	Hatchie	Tanigawa	Schaefer	Kohler	Riva	Seferian-Jenkins	Price	Callier	Hartvigson#	Mickens
at LSU	Williams	Hatchie	Tanigawa	Schaefer	Atoe	Kohler	Seferian-Jenkins	Price	Sankey	Taylor^	Smith
Portland State	Williams	Hatchie	Charles	Schaefer	Atoe	Criste	Seferian-Jenkins	Price	Sankey	Hudson#	Campbell
Stanford	Williams	Hatchie	Charles	Schaefer	Brostek	Atoe	Seferian-Jenkins	Price	Sankey	Hartvigson#	Campbell
at Oregon	Williams	Hatchie	Charles	Schaefer	Brostek	Atoe	Seferian-Jenkins	Price	Sankey	E. Hudson#	Campbell
USC	Williams	Hatchie	Charles	Schaefer	Brostek	Atoe	Seferian-Jenkins	Price	Sankey	Amosa	Mickens
at Arizona	Williams	Hatchie	Charles	Schaefer	Atoe	Riva	Seferian-Jenkins	Price	Sankey E.	Hudson	Mickens
Oregon State	Williams	Hatchie	Charles	Schaefer	Criste	Riva	Seferian-Jenkins	Price	Sankey	Hartvigson#	Campbell
at California	Williams	Hatchie	Charles	Schaefer	Criste	Riva	Seferian-Jenkins	Price	Sankey	Hudson#	Campbell
Utah	Williams	Hatchie	Charles	Schaefer	Criste	Riva	Seferian-Jenkins	Price	Sankey	Hudson#	Campbell
at Colorado	Williams	Hatchie	Charles	Schaefer	Criste	Riva	Seferian-Jenkins	Price	Sankey	Mickens^	Bruns
at Washington State											
Boise State											
Opponent	DE	NT	DE	RE	LB	ILB	NICKEL	S	S	CB	CB
San Diego State	Crichton	Shelton	A. Hudson	Shirley	Feeney	Timu	Thompson	Shamburger	Parker	Trufant	Watson
at LSU	Crichton	Shelton	A. Hudson	Shirley	Feeney	Timu	Thompson	Shamburger	Parker	Trufant	Watson
Portland State	Tokolahi	Shelton	A. Hudson	Shirley	Fuimaono	Timu	Thompson	Glenn	Parker	Trufant	Watson
Stanford	Tokolahi	Shelton	A. Hudson	Crichton	Tutogi	Timu	Thompson	Glenn	Parker	Trufant	Watson
at Oregon	Crichton	Shelton	A. Hudson	Littleton	Feeney	Timu	Thompson	Glenn	Parker	Trufant	Watson
USC	Crichton	Shelton	A. Hudson	Banks%	Feeney	Timu	Thompson	Glenn	Parker	Trufant	Peters
at Arizona	Crichton	Shelton	A. Hudson	Littleton	Feeney	Timu	Thompson	Glenn	Parker	Trufant	Peters
Oregon State	Crichton	Shelton	A. Hudson	Tokolahi%	Fuimaono	Timu	Thompson	Glenn	Parker	Trufant	Peters
at California	Crichton	Shelton	A. Hudson	Tokolahi%	Fuimaono	Timu	Thompson	Glenn	Parker	Trufant	Peters
Utah	Shelton	Schultz	A. Hudson	Tokolahi%	Feeney	Timu	Thompson	Glenn	Parker	Trufant	Peters
at Colorado	Tokolahi	Shelton	A. Hudson	Shirley	Feeney	Timu	Thompson	Glenn	Parker	Ducre	Peters
at Washington State											
Boise State											
# - started as second tight end, ^ - started as third wide receiver, % - started at defensive tackle

== Roster and coaching staff ==
2012 Washington Huskies football team roster
Players
Coaches
Offense

Pos.	#	Name	Class
FB	48	Jonathan Amosa	Sr
OL	70	James Atoe	So
TB	38	Dominic Boddie	Fr
QB	6	Derrick Brown	RFr
OL	60	Shane Brostek	Fr
WR	7	Cody Bruns	Sr
TB	24	Jesse Callier	Jr
WR	19	DiAndre Campbell	RSo
WR	27	William Chandler	Jr
OL	76	Dexter Charles	RFr
TB	32	Deontae Cooper	So
OL	78	Mike Criste	RSo
OL	74	Nathan Dean	Fr
OL	62	Ross Dolbec	RFr
OL	52	Jake Eldernkamp	Fr
OL	69	Cory Fuavai	Fr
WR	16	Marvin Hall	Fr
TE	84	Michael Hartvigson	RSo
OL	72	Micah Hatchee	RSo
OL	63	Taylor Hindy	Fr
TE	80	Evan Hudson	RSo
WR	3	James Johnson	Sr
WR	11	Jamaal Jones	RFr
TE	89	Alec Kimble	So
OL	75	Erik Kohler	Jr
QB	5	Jeff Lindquist	Fr
RB	31	Ryan McDaniel	Fr
WR	4	Jaydon Mickens	Fr
QB	10	Cyler Miles	Fr
WR	82	Joshua Perkins	RFr
TB/FB	34	Dezden Petty	RFr
QB	17	Keith Price	Jr
OL	59	Ben Riva	RSo
TB	35	Cole Sager	Sr
TB	25	Bishop Sankey	So
OL	73	Drew Schaefer	Sr
TE	88	Austin Seferian-Jenkins	So
WR	8	Kevin Smith	Jr
OL	64	Colin Tanigawa	RSo
TB/WR	23	Kendyl Taylor	Fr
OL	61	Ben Teichman	So
OL	65	Siosifa Tufunga	RFr
QB	14	Thomas Vincent	RFr
WR	12	Dwayne Washington	Fr
WR	2	Kasen Williams	So
QB	16	Erik Wilson	Jr
TB	20	Erich Wilson II	Fr
TB	29	Willis Wilson	RSo
FB	28	Psalm Wooching	Fr

Defense

Pos.	#	Name	Class
DT	99	Josh Banks	Jr
CB	9	Brandon Beaver	Fr
DE	91	Connor Cree	RFr
DE	11	Talia Crichton	Sr
CB	12	Travell Dixon	Jr
CB	18	Greg Ducre	Jr
S	42	Ken Egu	RSo
S	41	Travis Feeney	RFr
S	29	Nate Fellner	Sr
DE	95	Jarett Finau	RFr
LB	37	Princeton Fuimaono	Jr
LB	53	Garret Gilliland	Jr
S	20	Justin Glenn	Sr
CB	26	Anthony Gobern	Sr
DE	93	Andrew Hudson	RSo
DE	52	Hau'oli Jamora	So
LB	58	Jamaal Kearse	RSo
DL	97	Lawrence Lagafuaina	RSo
LB	47	Scott Lawyer	RFr
LB	42	Cory Littleton	Fr
DB	27	Adam Long	Sr
S	1	Sean Parker	Jr
LB	43	Cooper Pelluer	Jr
CB	21	Marcus Peters	RFr
DL	55	Sione Potoa'e	Jr
LB	36	Blake Rodgers	Fr
S	5	James Sample	RFr
DL	77	Drew Schultz	RSo
S	13	Will Shamburger	Jr
LB	40	Stetson Shearer	Jr
DL	71	Danny Shelton	So
DE	22	Josh Shirley	RSo
DB	4	Antavius Sims	Jr
S	14	Taz Stevenson	Jr
S	7	Shaq Thompson	Fr
LB	10	John Timu	So
DT	98	Semisi Tokolahi	Sr
CB	6	Desmond Trufant	Sr
DL	90	Taniela Tupou	RFr
LB	3	Thomas Tutogi	Jr
DE	44	Pio Vatuvei	Fr
CB	3	Cleveland Wallace	Fr
DE	45	Corey Waller	RFr
DB	35	Darien Washington	Fr
CB	32	Tre Watson	RJr
S	30	Evan Zeger	RFr

Special teams

Pos.	#	Name	Class
LS	51	David Butler	Jr
PK	46	Travis Coons	Jr
P	46	Korey Durkee	Fr
P	94	Knight Laird	RFr
PK	96	Santiago Lopez	Fr
LS	77	Ryan Masel	Fr

Head coach

- Steve Sarkisian
  4th season
  4th year at Washington
  alma mater: BYU

Coordinators/assistant coaches

- Eric Kiesau
  1st season as OC/QC coach
  1st year at Washington
  alma mater: Portland State
- Justin Wilcox
  1st season as DC coach
  1st year at Washington
  alma mater: Oregon
- Dan Cozzetto
  4th season as Run Game Coordinator/OL coach
  4th year at Washington
  alma mater: Idaho
- Jimmie Dougherty
  4th season as WR coach
  4th year at Washington
  alma mater: Missouri
- Keith Heyward
  1st season as DB Coach
  1st year at Washington
  alma mater: Oregon State
- Tosh Lupoi
  1st season as DL Coach/Defensive RG
  1st year at Washington
  alma mater: California
- Johnny Nansen
  4th season as ST/DL coach
  4th year at Washington
  alma mater: Washington State
- Peter Sirmon
  1st season as LB coach
  1st year at Washington
  alma mater: Oregon
- Joel Thomas
  4th season as RB coach
  4th year at Washington
  alma mater: Idaho
- Jordan Paopao
  2nd season as GA coach
  2nd year at Washington
  alma mater: San Diego
- Donte Williams
  2nd season as GA coach
  2nd year at Washington
  alma mater: Syracuse

Legend

- (C) Team captain
- (S) Suspended
- (I) Ineligible
- Injured
- Redshirt

Roster
Last update: September 30, 2012

== Game summaries ==
=== San Diego State ===
	1	2	3	4	Total
Aztecs	0	6	0	6	12
Huskies	14	0	7	0	21

=== LSU ===
	1	2	3	4	Total
Huskies	3	0	0	0	3
#3 Tigers	14	6	14	7	41

=== Portland State ===
	1	2	3	4	Total
Vikings	0	0	6	7	13
Huskies	14	31	7	0	52

=== Stanford ===
	1	2	3	4	Total
#8 Cardinal	3	3	7	0	13
Huskies	3	0	7	7	17

1st quarter scoring: STAN – Jordan Williamson 31-yard field goal; WASH – Travis Coons 43-yard field goal

2nd quarter scoring: STAN – Williamson 28-yard field goal

3rd quarter scoring: STAN – Trent Murphy 40-yard interception return (Williamson kick); WASH – Bishop Sankey 61-yard run (Coons kick)

4th quarter scoring: WASH – Kasen Williams 35-yard pass from Keith Price (Coons kick)

=== Oregon ===
	1	2	3	4	Total
#23 Huskies	0	7	7	7	21
#2 Ducks	21	14	3	14	52

=== USC ===
	1	2	3	4	Total
#13 Trojans	10	14	0	0	24
Huskies	7	0	7	0	14

=== Arizona ===
	1	2	3	4	Total
Huskies	3	14	0	0	17
Wildcats	10	21	14	7	52

=== Oregon State ===
	1	2	3	4	Total
#7 Beavers	0	0	10	7	17
Huskies	3	7	0	10	20

=== California ===
	1	2	3	4	Total
Huskies	7	0	7	7	21
Golden Bears	0	7	6	0	13

=== Utah ===
	1	2	3	4	Total
Utes	8	0	7	0	15
Huskies	0	14	13	7	34

=== Colorado ===
	1	2	3	4	Total
Huskies	0	7	17	14	38
Buffaloes	0	0	3	0	3

=== Washington State ===
	1	2	3	4	OT	Total
#25 Huskies	0	7	21	0	0	28
Cougars	3	7	0	18	3	31

This was the Huskies' last loss to the Cougars until 2021.

=== Boise State–Maaco Bowl Las Vegas ===
	1	2	3	4	Total
Huskies	3	14	6	3	26
#20 Broncos	9	9	7	3	28

== Notes ==
- September 4, 2012 – Jesse Callier out of the season due to a torn right knee anterior cruciate ligament; Ben Riva had a fractured forearm.
