= Joel Thomas (American football) =

American football player and coach (born 1974)

New Orleans Saints
- Title: Running backs coach

Personal information
- Born: November 7, 1974 (age 51); Port Angeles, Washington, U.S.

Career information
- Position: Running back
- High school: Port Angeles (WA)
- College: Idaho

Career history
- Purdue (2000–2001) Graduate assistant; Louisville (2002–2003) Running backs coach; Idaho (2004–2005) Co-offensive coordinator & running backs coach; Purdue (2006–2008) Running backs coach; Washington (2009–2011) Running backs coach; Washington (2012) Associate head coach for offense & running backs coach; Arkansas (2013–2014) Running backs coach; New Orleans Saints (2015–2023) Running backs coach; New York Giants (2024) Running backs coach; New Orleans Saints (2025–present) Associate head coach & running backs coach

Joel Thomas (born November 7, 1974) is an American football coach who is the running backs coach for the New Orleans Saints of the National Football League (NFL).

== Early life and playing career ==
Thomas graduated from Port Angeles High School in 1993. Following high school, he attended the University of Idaho, where he played as a running back for the Idaho Vandals. He was redshirted in 1995 for a broken foot, but returned to play for the team. Following what was at the time assumed to be a career ending injury to his knee during a 1997 game against the Air Force Falcons, he ultimately returned once again to play in his senior season. He graduated in 1998, and set the Vandals career records of 3,929 rushing yards, 51 rushing touchdowns and 765 rush attempts. The records still stand as of 2019.

Over his college career he was twice selected as a first-team All-Big West running back, and in 1998 he was named Big West Player of the Year. He helped lead the Vandal to a victory over Southern Miss that year's Humanitarian Bowl, receiving the Humanitarian Award following the game. He also received offers to play in the Senior Bowl and the East-West Shrine Game. Thomas graduated from the University of Idaho with a bachelor's degree in public communications.

== Coaching career ==
=== College coaching career ===
Thomas started his coaching career in 2000 as a graduate assistant coach at Purdue. He remained with Purdue through 2001, before assuming the running backs coach position with Louisville from 2002 to 2003. He was then the co-offensive coordinator and running backs coach for his alma mater, the University of Idaho, between 2004 and 2005, before returning to Purdue as the running backs coach from 2006 to 2008. Thomas then worked as the running backs coach for the Washington Huskies between 2009 and 2012, where he coached a 1000-yard rusher in each season. He was also named associate head coach for offensive responsibilities during the 2012 season.

In 2013, Thomas became the running backs coach for Arkansas, a position he held through the 2014 season. Upon his hiring, Razorbacks head coach Bret Bielema stated that, “He excelled at the position as a player and has demonstrated a remarkable ability to connect with his student-athletes and pass his knowledge on to them. He also brings a strong background of recruiting in Texas and Dallas specifically, which is a valuable area for us to have a presence.” During his final year with the Razorbacks, Arkansas defeated the Texas Longhorns in the 2014 Texas Bowl.

=== New Orleans Saints ===
In 2015, Thomas joined the coaching staff of the New Orleans Saints as the running backs coach, having previously done a training camp internship with the Saints in 2012. He had also held a training camp internship with the Pittsburgh Steelers in 2008. Between 2015 and 2018, the Saints led the NFL in total team rushing touchdowns (82).

Thomas missed the Saints' week 17 game on January 3, 2021, against the Carolina Panthers due to COVID-19 protocols.

=== New York Giants ===
On January 19, 2024, Thomas was hired by the New York Giants to serve as the team's running backs coach.

=== New Orleans Saints (second stint) ===
On February 18, 2025, the New Orleans Saints hired Thomas to serve as the team's running backs coach, a role he previously held from 2015 to 2023.

== Recognition ==
Thomas is a member of the Port Angeles High School Athletic Hall of Fame. He was also inducted into the University of Idaho Athletic Hall of Fame in 2008.

== Personal life ==
Thomas is married to his wife Ebbie Thomas, with whom he has two children.
