= Derrick Johnson (cornerback) =

American football player (born 1982)

No. 23, 25, 37
- Position: Cornerback

Personal information
- Born: February 9, 1982 (age 44); Long Beach, California, U.S.
- Listed height: 5 ft 10 in (1.78 m)
- Listed weight: 186 lb (84 kg)

Career information
- High school: Notre Dame (Riverside, California)
- College: Washington
- NFL draft: 2005: 6th round, 205th overall pick

Career history
- San Francisco 49ers (2005); Houston Texans (2006); Atlanta Falcons (2006); Miami Dolphins (2007)*; Houston Texans (2008)*; Seattle Seahawks (2008)*; Saskatchewan Roughriders (2009)*
- * Offseason or practice squad member only

Awards and highlights
- Second-team All-Pac-10 (2002, 2003)

Career NFL statistics
- Tackles: 43
- Fumble recoveries: 1
- Passes defended: 4
- Stats at Pro Football Reference
- Stats at CFL.ca (archive)

Derrick Johnson (born February 9, 1982) is an American former professional football player who was a cornerback in the National Football League (NFL). He played college football for the Washington Huskies and was selected by the San Francisco 49ers in the sixth round of the 2005 NFL draft.

As a rookie, Johnson played in 14 games, starting in 5, recording 41 total tackles, 1 sack, 4 passes defended and 1 fumble recovered, which he returned a Marcel Shipp fumble 78 yards for a touchdown against Arizona, Oct 2, 2005 in Mexico City.

Johnson was also a member of the Houston Texans, Atlanta Falcons, Miami Dolphins, Seattle Seahawks and Saskatchewan Roughriders.

== Early life ==
Johnson attended Notre Dame High School in Riverside, California where he lettered in football and also competed in track. As a senior in 1999, Johnson rushed for 1,990 yards with 39 touchdowns, and also had 586 yards receiving. For his efforts, he was the De Anza League most valuable player as well as all-CIF, all-county and Small Schools all-state selections.

Coming out of high school, Johnson was a member of the Tacoma News-Tribune's "Western 100" and a PrepStar All-Region pick at running back. He was ranked by PrepStar as the No. 9 running back in the West Region and ranked 37th in SuperPrep's California/Hawaii/Nevada 152.

== Professional career ==
Pre-draft measurables
Height	Weight	Arm length	Hand span	40-yard dash	10-yard split	20-yard split	20-yard shuttle	Three-cone drill	Bench press
5 ft 10 7/8 in (1.80 m)	197 lb (89 kg)	32 in (0.81 m)	8 3/4 in (0.22 m)	4.43 s	1.57 s	2.62 s	4.10 s	7.15 s	18 reps
All values from NFL Combine

== Coaching career ==
Johnson took up coaching after his playing days ended, coaching at California Military Institute, Canyon Springs High School and then at his alma mater, Notre Dame. In 2015, Johnson led the Titans to an undefeated 14-0 CIF SS Northwest Division Championship. The team also appeared in a state bowl game, the first time in school history. After two League championships, Johnson would resign and ultimately take on an assistant position at San Bernardino Valley College.

== See also ==
- Washington Huskies football statistical leaders
