= 2009 Washington Huskies football team =

American college football season

2009 Washington Huskies football
- Conference: Pacific-10 Conference
- Record: 5–7 (4–5 Pac-10)
- Head coach: Steve Sarkisian (1st season)
- Offensive coordinator: Doug Nussmeier (1st season)
- Offensive scheme: Pro-style
- Defensive coordinator: Nick Holt (1st season)
- Base defense: 4–3
- Captains: Donald Butler; Jake Locker; Daniel Te'o-Nesheim; Ryan Tolar
- Home stadium: Husky Stadium (Capacity: 72,500)

Uniform

2009 Pacific-10 Conference football standings
	Conf.			Overall
Team	W		L	W		L
No. 11 Oregon $	8	–	1	10	–	3
Arizona	6	–	3	8	–	5
Oregon State	6	–	3	8	–	5
Stanford	6	–	3	8	–	5
No. 22 USC	5	–	4	9	–	4
California	5	–	4	8	–	5
Washington	4	–	5	5	–	7
UCLA	3	–	6	7	–	6
Arizona State	2	–	7	4	–	8
Washington State	0	–	9	1	–	11
$ – BCS representative as conference champion; Rankings from AP Poll

The 2009 Washington Huskies football team represented the University of Washington in the 2009 NCAA Division I FBS football season. The team's head coach was Steve Sarkisian, who replaced Tyrone Willingham following a winless 2008 season. The Huskies played their home games at Husky Stadium in Seattle, Washington. The Huskies finished the season 5–7 and 4–5 in Pac-10 play.

== Schedule ==
Date	Time	Opponent	Rank	Site	TV	Result	Attendance	Source
September 5	7:30 p.m.	No. 11 LSU*		Husky Stadium; Seattle, WA	ESPN	L 23–31	69,161	
September 12	12:30 p.m.	Idaho*		Husky Stadium; Seattle, WA	FSNNW	W 42–23	58,980	
September 19	12:30 p.m.	No. 3 USC		Husky Stadium; Seattle, WA	ABC	W 16–13	61,889	
September 26	6:00 p.m.	at Stanford	No. 24	Stanford Stadium; Stanford, CA	FCS	L 14–34	36,930	
October 3	12:30 p.m.	at Notre Dame*		Notre Dame Stadium; Notre Dame, IN	NBC	L 30–37 ^{OT}	80,795	
October 10	7:00 p.m.	Arizona		Husky Stadium; Seattle, WA	FSNNW	W 36–33	61,621	
October 17	7:15 p.m.	at Arizona State		Sun Devil Stadium; Tempe, AZ	FSN	L 17–24	53,219	
October 24	12:30 p.m.	No. 11 Oregon^{†}		Husky Stadium; Seattle, WA (rivalry)	ABC	L 19–43	67,809	
November 7	12:30 p.m.	at UCLA		Rose Bowl; Pasadena, CA	FSNNW	L 23–24	72,924	
November 14	12:30 p.m.	at No. 23 Oregon State		Reser Stadium; Corvallis, OR	FSNNW	L 21–48	45,274	
November 28	3:30 p.m.	Washington State		Husky Stadium; Seattle, WA (Apple Cup)	FSNNW	W 30–0	68,697	
December 5	3:30 p.m.	No. 19 California		Husky Stadium; Seattle, WA	FSNNW	W 42–10	62,334	
*Non-conference game; ^{†}Homecoming; Rankings from AP Poll and BCS Rankings after October 18 released prior to game; All times are in Pacific time

== Game summaries ==
=== No. 11 LSU ===
No. 11 LSU Tigers at Washington Huskies – Game summary

Quarter	1	2	3	4	Total
No. 11 Tigers	10	7	7	7	31
Huskies	7	6	0	10	23

at Husky Stadium, Seattle, Washington

- Date: September 5
- Game time: 7:30 p.m. PDT
- Game weather: Overcast, 61 °F (16 °C)
- Game attendance: 69,161
- Referee: Michael Baltan
- TV: ESPN
- Box score, Recap

Game information
First quarter
- WASH – James Johnson 17-yard pass from Jake Locker (Erik Folk kick), 10:35. Huskies 7–0. Drive: 10 plays, 85 yards, 4:25.
- LSU – Josh Jasper 24-yard field goal, 6:03. Huskies 7–3. Drive: 12 plays, 62 yards, 4:25.
- LSU – Jacob Cutrera 29-yard interception return (Josh Jasper kick), 5:49. Tigers 10–7.

Second quarter

- WASH – Erik Folk 34-yard field goal, 13:50. Tied 10–10. Drive: 4 plays, 8 yards, 0:47.
- LSU – Terrence Toliver 45-yard pass from Jordan Jefferson (Josh Jasper kick), 1:15. Tigers 17–10. Drive: 7 plays, 75 yards, 2:34.
- WASH – Erik Folk 37-yard field goal, 0:00. Tigers 17–13. Drive: 8 plays, 72 yards, 1:07.

Third quarter

- LSU – Terrence Toliver 39-yard pass from Jordan Jefferson (Josh Jasper kick), 5:50. Tigers 24–13. Drive: 9 plays, 86 yards, 4:31.

Fourth quarter

- WASH – Erik Folk 32-yard field goal, 5:24. Tigers 24–16. Drive: 11 plays, 44 yards, 4:20.
- LSU – Brandon Lafell 6-yard pass from Jordan Jefferson (Josh Jasper kick), 1:54. Tigers 31–16. Drive: 6 plays, 67 yards, 3:24.
- WASH – Kavario Middleton 9-yard pass from Jake Locker (Erik Folk kick), 0:00. Tigers 31–23. Drive: 10 plays, 81 yards, 1:48.

Statistics	LSU	WASH
First downs	17	25
Total yards	321	478
Rushing yards	149	157
Passing yards	172	321
Turnovers	1	2
Time of possession	23:08	36:52

Team	Category	Player	Statistics
LSU	Passing	Jordan Jefferson	11/19, 172 yards, 3 TD
LSU	Rushing	Charles Scott	12 rushes, 52 yards
LSU	Receiving	Terrence Toliver	4 receptions, 117 yards, 2 TD
Washington	Passing	Jake Locker	25/45, 321 yards, 2 TD, INT
Washington	Rushing	Chris Polk	21 rushes, 90 yards
Washington	Receiving	Devin Aguilar	4 receptions, 76 yards

LSU came into the game ranked #11 in the nation, but the Washington Huskies earned their respect after they gave up 478 total yards to Washington. The Washington Huskies had 13:44 time of possession edge and ran 83 offensive plays to LSU's 48, but lost the game due to a couple untimely turnovers and blown defensive plays.

=== Idaho ===
Idaho Vandals at Washington Huskies – Game summary

Quarter	1	2	3	4	Total
Vandals	3	6	7	7	23
Huskies	7	14	14	7	42

at Husky Stadium, Seattle, Washington

- Date: September 12
- Game time: 12:30 p.m. PDT
- Game weather: Sunny, 74 °F (23 °C)
- Game attendance: 58,980
- Referee: Brian O'Cain
- TV: FSNNW
- Box score, Recap

Game information
First quarter
- WASH – Jake Locker 3-yard run (Erik Folk kick), 6:24. Huskies 7–0. Drive: 14 plays, 97 yards, 5:27.
- IDHO – Trey Farquhar 44-yard field goal, 0:13. Huskies 7–3. Drive: 9 plays, 40 yards, 6:03.

Second quarter

- WASH – Johri Fogerson 24-yard pass from Jake Locker (Erik Folk kick), 10:47. Huskies 14–3. Drive: 9 plays, 71 yards, 4:20.
- IDHO – Trey Farquhar 28-yard field goal, 6:16. Huskies 14–6. Drive: 10 plays, 66 yards, 4:23.
- WASH – James Johnson 31-yard pass from Jake Locker (Erik Folk kick), 1:31. Huskies 21–6. Drive: 9 plays, 66 yards, 4:37.
- IDHO – Trey Farquhar 34-yard field goal, 0:00. Huskies 21–9. Drive: 8 plays, 61 yards, 1:34.

Third quarter

- WASH – Chris Polk 1-yard run (Erik Folk kick), 12:11. Huskies 28–9. Drive: 4 plays, 21 yards, 1:09.
- WASH – Chris Izbicki 2-yard pass from Jake Locker (Erik Folk kick), 10:17. Huskies 35–9. Drive: 2 plays, 36 yards, 0:34.
- IDHO – Demaundray Woolridge 4-yard run (Trey Farquhar kick), 3:58. Huskies 35–16. Drive: 11 plays, 65 yards, 6:11.

Fourth quarter

- WASH – Johri Forgerson 2-yard run (Erik Folk kick), 9:15. Huskies 42–16. Drive: 11 plays, 57 yards, 5:33.
- IDHO – Demaundray Woolridge 6-yard run (Trey Farquhar kick), 0:13. Huskies 42–23. Drive: 9 plays, 92 yards, 4:18.

Statistics	IDHO	WASH
First downs	20	20
Total yards	412	374
Rushing yards	63	121
Passing yards	349	353
Turnovers	1	1
Time of possession	32:29	27:31

Team	Category	Player	Statistics
Idaho	Passing	Nathan Enderle	22/33, 279 yards, INT
Idaho	Rushing	Demaundray Woolridge	7 rushes, 41 yards, 2 TD
Idaho	Receiving	Daniel Hardy	6 receptions, 103 yards
Washington	Passing	Jake Locker	17/25, 254 yards, 3 TD
Washington	Rushing	Chris Polk	19 rushes, 80 yards, TD
Washington	Receiving	D'Andre Goodwin	3 receptions, 83 yards

Washington ended the nation's longest losing streak at 15 games and gave new coach Steve Sarkisian his first victory, beating Idaho 42–23. Sarkisian's first win as a head coach came as the Huskies scored touchdowns on its first five possessions—minus a fumble on the opening kickoff of the second half—making up for a defense that showed weakness against the pass. Locker tossed touchdowns of 24, 31 and 4 yards and added a 3-yard TD run of his own as Washington picked up its first victory since Nov. 17, 2007 when it beat California.

Despite the offensive performance, the Huskies defense showed it still has a long way to go in defending the pass. Quarterback Nathan Enderle threw for 279 yards—part of the 349 total passing yards by the Vandals. But Idaho had to settle for three field goals on three trips inside the Washington 20 in the first half.

Enderle then made his one crucial mistake on the first possession of the second half. After Washington's Curtis Shaw fumbled the second half kickoff and Idaho recovered, Enderle faced a third-and-4 at the Washington 25. Throwing toward the near sideline, Enderle's pass found the hands of linebacker Mason Foster, who returned the turnover 56 yards to the Idaho 21. Four plays later, and after Locker hit D'Andre Goodwin for 20 yards to the 1 on third down, Chris Polk plowed in for his first touchdown of the season. The Vandals ended up out-gaining Washington 412 to 374, but were hampered by eight penalties and an inability to get Washington off the field

=== No. 3 USC ===
No. 3 USC Trojans at Washington Huskies – Game summary

Quarter	1	2	3	4	Total
No. 3 Trojans	10	0	0	3	13
Huskies	7	3	0	6	16

at Husky Stadium, Seattle, Washington

- Date: September 19
- Game time: 12:30 p.m. PDT
- Game weather: Overcast, 60 °F (16 °C)
- Game attendance: 61,889
- Referee: Jack Folliard
- TV: ABC
- Box score, Recap

Game information
First quarter
- USC – Joe McKnight 7-yard run (Jordan Congdon kick), 12:28. Trojans 7–0. Drive: 6 plays, 80 yards, 2:32.
- USC – Jordan Congdon 42-yard field goal, 4:36. Trojans 10–0. Drive: 8 plays, 68 yards, 3:53.
- WASH – Jake Locker 4-yard run (Erik Folk kick), 0:11. Trojans 10–7. Drive: 8 plays, 68 yards, 4:17.

Second quarter

- WASH – Erik Folk 28-yard field goal, 4:09. Tied 10–10. Drive: 8 plays, 45 yards, 3:23.

Third quarter

- No scoring plays

Fourth quarter

- WASH – Erik Folk 46-yard field goal, 9:53. Huskies 13–10. Drive: 11 plays, 33 yards, 4:28.
- USC – Jordan Congdon 25-yard field goal, 4:07. Tied 13–13. Drive: 6 plays, 49 yards, 2:57.
- WASH – Erik Folk 22-yard field goal, 0:03. Huskies 16–13. Drive: 10 plays, 63 yards, 3:58.

Statistics	USC	WASH
First downs	16	20
Total yards	360	293
Rushing yards	250	56
Passing yards	110	237
Turnovers	3	0
Time of possession	25:49	34:11

Team	Category	Player	Statistics
USC	Passing	Aaron Corp	13/22, 110 yards, INT
USC	Rushing	Joe McKnight	11 rushes, 100 yards, TD
USC	Receiving	Damian Williams	3 receptions, 40 yards
Washington	Passing	Jake Locker	21/35, 237 yards
Washington	Rushing	Chris Polk	25 rushes, 71 yards
Washington	Receiving	James Johnson	7 receptions, 72 yards

The underdog Washington Huskies upset the USC Trojans on a last second field goal for a 16–13 win. The game snapped a 7-game winning streak for the Trojans over the Huskies, the last victory coming in 2001. For USC, Aaron Corp started for the injured Matt Barkley at quarterback.

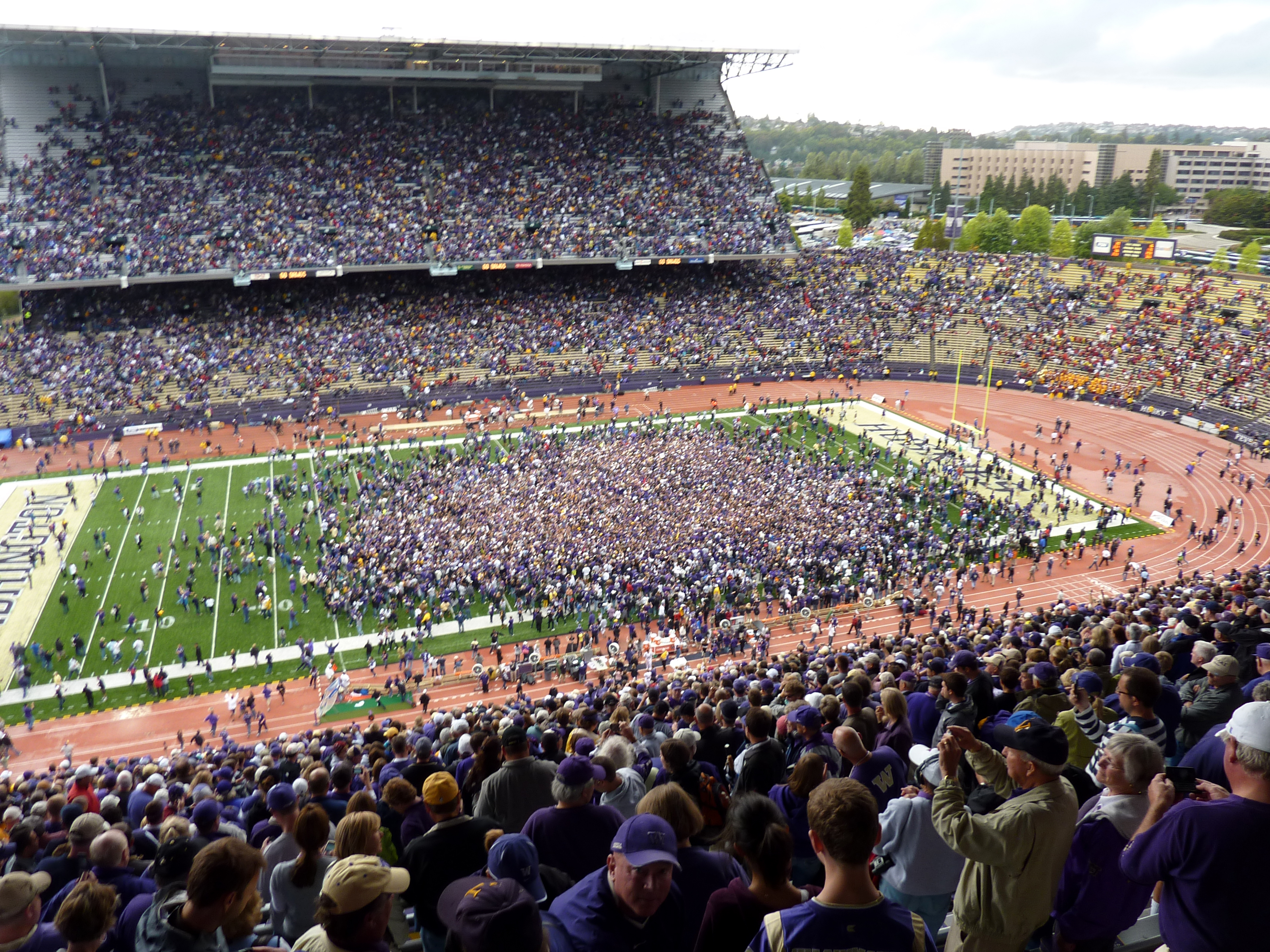
Ecstatic Huskies fans storm the field in celebration after defeating the No. 3 Trojans in an upset.

The Huskies became the latest Pac-10 team to upset the Trojans, only two Pacific-10 Conference teams have failed to beat USC during the Pete Carroll era: Arizona and Arizona State. Other Pac-10 teams have defeated USC at least once during this period, Oregon State did it twice, 2006 and again in 2008.

=== At Stanford ===
No. 24 Washington Huskies at Stanford Cardinal – Game summary

Quarter	1	2	3	4	Total
No. 24 Huskies	7	7	0	0	14
Cardinal	14	10	3	7	34

at Stanford Stadium, Stanford, California

- Date: September 26
- Game time: 6:00 p.m. PDT
- Game attendance: 36,930
- TV: FCS

Statistics	WASH	STAN
First downs		
Total yards		
Rushing yards		
Passing yards		
Turnovers		
Time of possession		

Team	Category	Player	Statistics
Washington	Passing		
Washington	Rushing		
Washington	Receiving		
Stanford	Passing		
Stanford	Rushing		
Stanford	Receiving		

=== At Notre Dame ===
Washington Huskies at Notre Dame Fighting Irish – Game summary

Quarter	1	2	3	4	OT	Total
Huskies	7	10	7	6	0	30
Fighting Irish	3	13	3	11	7	37

at Notre Dame Stadium, Notre Dame, Indiana

- Date: October 3
- Game time: 12:30 p.m. PDT/3:30 p.m. EDT
- Game attendance: 80,795
- TV: NBC

Statistics	WASH	ND
First downs		
Total yards		
Rushing yards		
Passing yards		
Turnovers		
Time of possession		

Team	Category	Player	Statistics
WASH	Passing		
WASH	Rushing		
WASH	Receiving		
Notre Dame	Passing		
Notre Dame	Rushing		
Notre Dame	Receiving		

Notre Dame defeats the Washington Huskies 37–30 at Notre Dame Stadium to give Notre Dame its 4th win of the season. Notre Dame stayed alive with 3 goal line stands resulting in only 3 Washington Husky points. Golden Tate was able to scorch Washington's defense for 244 yards receiving, 31 yards rushing and one touchdown. Notre Dame finally wins in OT and extends their record to 8–0 against the Huskies.

=== Arizona ===
Arizona Wildcats at Washington Huskies – Game summary

Quarter	1	2	3	4	Total
Wildcats	7	3	17	6	33
Huskies	7	7	7	15	36

at Husky Stadium, Seattle, Washington

- Date: October 10
- Game time: 7:00 p.m. PDT
- Game attendance: 61,621
- TV: FSNNW

Statistics	ARIZ	WASH
First downs		
Total yards		
Rushing yards		
Passing yards		
Turnovers		
Time of possession		

Team	Category	Player	Statistics
Arizona	Passing		
Arizona	Rushing		
Arizona	Receiving		
Washington	Passing		
Washington	Rushing		
Washington	Receiving		

=== At Arizona State ===
Washington Huskies at Arizona State Sun Devils – Game summary

Quarter	1	2	3	4	Total
Huskies	7	0	7	3	17
Sun Devils	7	7	3	7	24

at Sun Devil Stadium, Tempe, Arizona

- Date: October 17
- Game time: 7:15 p.m. PDT
- Game attendance: 53,219
- TV: FSN

Statistics	WASH	ASU
First downs		
Total yards		
Rushing yards		
Passing yards		
Turnovers		
Time of possession		

Team	Category	Player	Statistics
Washington	Passing		
Washington	Rushing		
Washington	Receiving		
Arizona State	Passing		
Arizona State	Rushing		
Arizona State	Receiving		

With the appearance the game would be heading into overtime, ASU quarterback Danny Sullivan threw a 50-yard touchdown pass to receiver Chris McGaha in the last five seconds of the game.

=== No. 14 Oregon ===
No. 14 Oregon Ducks at Washington Huskies – Game summary

Quarter	1	2	3	4	Total
No. 14 Ducks	0	15	21	7	43
Huskies	3	3	0	13	19

at Husky Stadium, Seattle, Washington

- Date: October 24
- Game time: 12:30 p.m. PDT
- Game attendance: 67,809
- TV: ABC

Statistics	ORE	WASH
First downs		
Total yards		
Rushing yards		
Passing yards		
Turnovers		
Time of possession		

Team	Category	Player	Statistics
Oregon	Passing		
Oregon	Rushing		
Oregon	Receiving		
Washington	Passing		
Washington	Rushing		
Washington	Receiving		

After Erik Folk's 33-yard field goal in the first quarter for Washington, Nate Costa rushed for 3 yards for a touchdown in the second quarter to give the Ducks their first lead. Then Javes Lewis intercepted Jake Locker's pass in the end zone to give Oregon the ball back, which resulted in Jeremiah Masoli scoring from the 1-yard line for their second touchdown. With a second left, Folk kicked a 48-yard field goal to end the half, which was aided by a personal foul on Oregon.

Unable to move, the Huskies turned the ball over to Oregon and the Ducks scored their third touchdown on Masoli's 3-yard run in the top of the third quarter.

=== At UCLA ===
Washington Huskies at UCLA Bruins – Game summary

Quarter	1	2	3	4	Total
Huskies	10	6	7	0	23
Bruins	14	0	7	3	24

at Rose Bowl, Los Angeles, California

- Date: November 7
- Game time: 12:30 p.m. PST
- Game attendance: 72,924
- TV: FSNNW

Statistics	WASH	UCLA
First downs		
Total yards		
Rushing yards		
Passing yards		
Turnovers		
Time of possession		

Team	Category	Player	Statistics
Washington	Passing		
Washington	Rushing		
Washington	Receiving		
UCLA	Passing		
UCLA	Rushing		
UCLA	Receiving		

The Huskies failed to capitalize on UCLA's five turnovers and lost to the Bruins by a point at the Rose Bowl. Down by a point, Erik Folk's 38-yard field goal kick in the fourth quarter was no good. Folk kicked three field goals, two in the second quarter, and Jermaine Kearse scored two pass-touchdowns for the Huskies. Jake Locker completed 23 of 40 passes for 235 yards.

Kai Forbath kicked a 27-yard field goal earlier in the final period to win the game for the Bruins. Kevin Prince completed 13 of 17 passes for 212 yards and Kevin Craft had 10 of 14 completions for 159 yards. Both gave up an interception.

=== At No. 23 Oregon State ===
Washington Huskies at No. 23 Oregon State Beavers – Game summary

Quarter	1	2	3	4	Total
Huskies	0	7	0	14	21
No. 23 Beavers	10	17	14	7	48

at Reser Stadium, Corvallis, Oregon

- Date: November 14
- Game time: 12:30 p.m. PST
- Game attendance: 45,274
- TV: FSNNW

Statistics	WASH	ORST
First downs		
Total yards		
Rushing yards		
Passing yards		
Turnovers		
Time of possession		

Team	Category	Player	Statistics
Washington	Passing		
Washington	Rushing		
Washington	Receiving		
Oregon State	Passing		
Oregon State	Rushing		
Oregon State	Receiving		

=== Washington State ===
Washington State Cougars at Washington Huskies – Game summary

Quarter	1	2	3	4	Total
Cougars	0	0	0	0	0
Huskies	3	10	7	10	30

at Husky Stadium, Seattle, Washington

- Date: November 28
- Game time: 3:30 p.m. PST
- Game attendance: 68,697
- TV: FSNNW

Statistics	WSU	WASH
First downs		
Total yards		
Rushing yards		
Passing yards		
Turnovers		
Time of possession		

Team	Category	Player	Statistics
Washington State	Passing		
Washington State	Rushing		
Washington State	Receiving		
Washington	Passing		
Washington	Rushing		
Washington	Receiving		

=== No. 19 California ===
No. 19 California Golden Bears at Washington Huskies – Game summary

Quarter	1	2	3	4	Total
No. 19 Golden Bears	3	0	7	0	10
Huskies	7	14	14	7	42

at Husky Stadium, Seattle, Washington

- Date: December 5
- Game time: 3:30 p.m. PST
- Game attendance: 62,334
- TV: FSNNW

Statistics	CAL	WASH
First downs		
Total yards		
Rushing yards		
Passing yards		
Turnovers		
Time of possession		

Team	Category	Player	Statistics
California	Passing		
California	Rushing		
California	Receiving		
Washington	Passing		
Washington	Rushing		
Washington	Receiving		

== Roster ==
No.	Name	Pos.	Ht.	Wt.	Yr Exp	Hometown/Last School
1	Chris Polk	TB	5-11	210	RS FR-RS	Redlands, Calif./East Valley
1	Talia Crichton	DE	6-3	229	FR-HS	Lakewood, Calif./Lakewood
3	Alvin Logan	LB	6-2	219	SO-1V	Aurora, Colo./Regis Jesuit
3	James Johnson	WR	6-0	193	FR-HS	Valley Center, Calif./Valley Center
4	Vonzell McDowell, Jr	CB	5-9	180	JR-2V	Kent, Wash./Rainier Beach
4	Chris Izbicki	TE	6-3	232	SO-SQ	Kirkland, Wash./Lake Washington
5	Anthony Boyles	CB	6-3	197	RS FR-RS	Compton, Calif./Junipero Serra
5	Matt Houston	LB	6-0	220	JR-1V	Goleta, Calif./Dos Pueblos
6	Desmond Trufant	CB	6-0	172	FR-HS	Tacoma, Wash./Wilson
7	Anthony Gobern	CB	5-11	183	FR-HS	Fair Oaks, Calif./Del Campo
7	Cody Bruns	WR	5-11	176	SO-1V	Prosser, Wash./Prosser
8	Ronnie Fouch	QB	6-1	198	SO-1V	Redlands, Calif./Redlands East Valley
8	Nate Williams	FS	6-0	221	JR-2V	Renton, Wash./Kennedy
9	Devin Aguilar	WR	6-0	184	SO-1V	Denver, Colo./Mullen
9	Donald Butler	LB	6-1	235	SR-3V	Sacramento, Calif./Del Campo
10	Jake Locker	QB	6-3	226	JR-1V	Ferndale, Wash./Ferndale
11	D'Andre Goodwin	WR	5-11	183	JR-2V	Pacoima, Calif./Antelope Valley
12	Luther Leonard	WR	6-2	208	RS FR-RS	Seattle, Wash./Evergreen
13	Taylor Bean	QB	6-1	193	SO-SQ	Vancouver, Wash./Skyview
13	Will Shamburger	S	6-0	188	FR-HS	Compton, Calif./St. John Bosco
14	Curtis Shaw	TB	5-10	186	SO-SQ	Stockton, Calif./Lincoln
15	Jermaine Kearse	WR	6-2	198	SO-1V	Lakewood, Wash./Lakes
16	Vince Taylor	WR	6-2	203	RS FR-RS	Issaquah, Wash./Eastside Catholic
16	Eric Guttorp	PK	5-7	168	SO-SQ	Seattle, Wash./Nathan Hale
17	Erik Folk	PK	5-11	185	SO-SQ	Woodland Hills, Calif./Notre Dame
17	Keith Price	QB	6-1	184	FR-HS	Compton, Calif./St. John Bosco
18	Marlion Barnett	TE	6-2	212	FR-HS	Corona, Calif./Santiago
20	Cole Sager	RB	5-10	196	FR-HS	Burlington, Wash./Burlington-Edison
20	Justin Glenn	S	5-11	198	RS FR-RS	Mukilteo, Wash./Kamiak
21	Jordan Wallace	LB	6-0	221	FR-HS	Sacramento, Calif./Grant
21	Willie Griffin	TB	5-8	191	SO-1V	Oakland, Calif./McClymonds
22	Demitrius Bronson	RB	5-10	206	FR-HS	Kent, Wash./Kentwood
22	E.J. Savannah	LB	6-1	228	SR-2V	Bellevue, Wash./Bellevue
23	Johri Fogerson	TB	6-1	191	SO-1V	Kent, Wash./O'Dea
24	Joshua Gage	LB	6-2	225	SR-2V	Huntington Beach, Calif./Edison
26	Jason Wells	FS	6-2	214	SR-2V	La Verne, Calif./Mt. San Antonio JC
27	Adam Long	CB	5-10	166	RS FR-RS	Los Angeles, Calif./St. Bernard
27	William Chandler	WR	6-0	180	FR-HS	Sammamish, Wash./Skyline
28	Quinton Richardson	CB	6-0	203	SO-1V	Renton, Wash./O'Dea
28	Tony Chidiac	WR	5-11	187	JR-1V	Sammamish, Wash./Skyline
29	Nate Fellner	S	6-1	198	FR-HS	Fresno, Calif./Clovis West
30	Paul Homer	FB	6-1	237	SR-3V	Omaha, Neb./Millard North
31	Cort Dennison	LB	6-1	220	SO-1V	Salt Lake City, Utah/Judge Memorial
32	Kurt Mangum	LB	6-0	241	RS FR-RS	Chandler, Ariz./Chandler
34	Tim Tucker	LB	6-1	234	FR-HS	Harbor City, Calif./Narbonne
35	Brandon Yakaboski	TB	5-11	200	SO-SQ	Duvall, Wash./Mt. Si
35	Tripper Johnson	DB	6-1	211	SR-1V	Bellevue, Wash./Newport
36	David Butler	LS	5-11	225	FR-HS	Liberty Lake, Wash./Central Valley
38	Marquis Persley	CB	6-0	188	SO-1V	Redlands, Calif./East Valley
39	Greg Walker	S	5-10	197	RS FR-RS	Bellflower, Calif./St. Bernard
40	Mason Foster	LB	6-2	244	JR-2V	Seaside, Calif./Seaside
41	Victor Aiyewa	SS	6-1	208	JR-1V	Fresno, Texas/Hightower
41	Tobias Togi	FB	5-11	239	SO-SQ	Seattle, Wash./Evergreen
42	Kimo Makaula	FB	6-2	248	FR-HS	Kailua, Hawai'i/Punahou
42	Taylor Lappano	DB	5-11	196	RS FR-1V	Sammamish, Wash./Eastlake
43	T.J. Poe	LB	6-1	225	SR-2V	Enumclaw, Wash./Enumclaw
45	Anthony Tokunaga	WR	5-11	177	FR-HS	Honolulu, Hawai'i/Kamehameha
46	Will Mahan	P	5-11	200	JR-JC	Bakersfield, Calif./Bakersfield College
47	Austin Sylvester	FB	6-1	241	JR-1V	Reno, Nev./Bishop Manogue/The Hun (N.J.)
48	Jonathan Amosa	LB	5-11	224	RS FR-RS	Seattle, Wash./Rainier Beach
49	Danny Morovick	LS	6-4	217	SR-3V	Mission Viejo, Calif./Saddleback CC
50	Kalani Aldrich	DL	6-7	250	SO-SQ	Hilo, Hawaii/Kamehameha-Hawaii
51	Mykenna Ikehara	OL	6-2	260	RS FR-RS	Mililani, Hawai'i/Kamehameha
52	Nick Wood	DT	6-3	273	SO-SQ	Poway, Calif./Poway
53	Pete Galbraith	DE	6-1	250	SO-SQ	Deming, Wash./Mount Baker
54	Brandon Huppert	LB	6-1	218	JR-SQ	Edmonds, Wash./Edmonds-Woodway
56	Reece Anderson	LB	5-11	188	FR-HS	Bellevue, Wash./Newport/Cheshire Acad.
56	Senio Kelemete	OL	6-4	281	SO-1V	Seattle, Wash./Evergreen
57	Trenton Tuiasosopo	LB	6-1	241	SR-3V	Everett, Wash./Mariner
58	Andru Pulu	DE	6-1	251	FR-HS	Federal Way, Wash./Federal Way
59	Darrion Jones	DE	6-2	256	SR-2V	Lynwood, Calif./Lynwood
60	Brendan Lopez	LS	6-0	223	SO-SQ	Bellevue, Wash./Michigan
61	Gregory Christine	C	6-2	284	JR-SQ	Camarillo, Calif./St. Bonaventure
63	Daniel Kanczugowski	DL	6-4	313	RS FR-RS	Edmonds, Wash./O'Dea
64	Travis Dupart	DL	6-2	245	SO-TR	Roswell, Ga./Valdosta State
65	Ryan Tolar	C/OG	6-5	293	JR-2V	Pasco, Wash./Pasco
66	Daniel Te'o-Nesheim	DE	6-4	263	SR-3V	Waikoloa, Hawai'i/Hawaii Prep
67	Skyler Fancher	OL	6-5	288	SO-1V	Costa Mesa, Calif./Huntington Beach
68	Mark Armelin	OT	6-5	283	SO-SQ	Canoga Park, Calif./Bishop Alemany
69	Nick Scott	OT	6-5	318	SR-SQ	St. Louis, Mo./Drake Univ.
70	Morgan Rosborough	OG	6-6	379	SR-1V	Long Beach, Calif./Jordan
71	Cody Habben	OT	6-6	295	JR-2V	Sammamish, Wash./Skyline
73	Drew Schaefer	OT	6-4	288	RS FR-RS	Sammamish, Wash./Eastlake
74	Alameda Ta'amu	DT	6-3	348	SO-1V	Kent, Wash./Rainier Beach
75	Terence Thomas	OT	6-9	290	RS FR-RS	Caldwell, Idaho/Caldwell
77	Scott Shugert	OG	6-5	304	SO-SQ	Oregon City, Ore./Oregon City
79	Craig Noble	DT	6-3	309	RS FR-RS	Los Angeles, Calif./Taft
79	Ben Ossai	OG	6-6	335	SR-3V	Bakersfield, Calif./Stockdale
80	Kavario Middleton	TE	6-5	253	SO-1V	Lakewood, Wash./Lakes
82	Jordan Polk	WR	5-7	162	SO-1V	Portland, Ore./Lincoln
85	Marek Domanski	TE	6-5	247	RS FR-RS	Seattle, Wash./Shorecrest
86	Ben Hayes	LS	6-3	209	SO-SQ	Renton, Wash./O'Dea
88	Dorson Boyce	TE	6-2	231	JR-JC	New York, N.Y./Allan Hancock College
89	Conrad Remington	DE	6-1	228	SO-SQ	Omaha, Neb./Omaha North
90	Chris Robinson	DT	6-0	250	FR-HS	Tustin, Calif./Tustin
91	Tyrone Duncan	DT	6-2	272	SO-SQ	Westlake Village, Calif./Westlake
92	Everrette Thompson	DE	6-6	262	SO-1V	Renton, Wash./Kennedy
93	Paul Dickey	P	6-1	194	SR-HS	Redmond, Wash./Lower Columbia CC
94	Kiel Rasp	P	6-3	215	SO-SQ	Seattle, Wash./Nathan Hale
95	Houston Hubert	PK	5-10	175	FR-HS	Bellevue, Wash./Bellevue
96	De'Shon Matthews	DT	6-4	261	JR-1V	Sacramento, Calif./Laguna Creek
97	Fred Wiggs	LB	6-1	225	JR-2V	Seattle, Wash./O'Dea
98	Semisi Tokolahi	DT	6-2	340	FR-HS	Hilo, Hawai'i/Hilo
99	Cameron Elisara	DT	6-3	275	JR-1V	Spokane, Wash./Ferris

== Game Starters ==
Opponent	WR	LT	LG	C	RG	RT	TE	QB	TB	FB	WR
LSU	J. Polk	Ossai	Christine	Tolar	Kelemete	Habben	Middleton	Locker	C. Polk	Izbicki%	J. Johnson
IDAHO	Aguilar	Ossai	Christine	Tolar	Kelemete	Habben	Middleton	Locker	C. Polk	Izbicki%	J. Johnson
USC	Aguilar	Ossai	Christine	Tolar	Kelemete	Habben	Middleton	Locker	C. Polk	Kearse^	J. Johnson
at Stanford	Kearse	Ossai	Christine	Tolar	Kelemete	Habben	Middleton	Locker	C. Polk	Izbicki%	Goodwin
at Notre Dame	Kearse	Ossai	Christine	Tolar	Kelemete	Habben	Middleton	Locker	C. Polk	Goodwin^	J. Johnson
ARIZONA	Aguilar	Ossai	Christine	Tolar	Kelemete	Habben	Middleton	Locker	C. Polk	Izbicki%	J. Johnson
at Arizona State	Aguilar	Ossai	Wood	Tolar	Kelemete	Habben	Middleton	Locker	C. Polk	Kearse^	J. Johnson
OREGON	Aguilar	Ossai	Wood	Tolar	Kelemete	Habben	Middleton	Locker	C. Polk	Izbicki%	Kearse
at UCLA	Aguilar	Schaefer	Wood	Tolar	Rosborough	Habben	Middleton	Locker	C. Polk	Homer	Kearse
at Oregon State	Aguilar	Schaefer	Wood	Tolar	Kelemete	Habben	Middleton	Locker	C. Polk	Homer	Kearse
WASHINGTON STATE	Aguilar	Schaefer	Ossai	Tolar	Kelemete	Habben	Middleton	Locker	C. Polk	Kearse^	J. Johnson
CALIFORNIA	Aguilar	Schaefer	Ossai	Ikehara	Kelemete	Habben	Bruns^	Locker	C. Polk	Homer	Kearse

% - started as second tight end ^ - started as third wide receiver

Opponent	DE	DT	DT	DE	OLB	ILB	OLB	S	S	CB	CB
LSU	Te’o-Nesheim	Ta’amu	Elisara	Jones	Savannah	Butler	Foster	Williams	Walker	McDowell	Richardson
IDAHO	Te’o-Nesheim	Ta’amu	Elisara	Aldrich	Savannah	Butler	Foster	Williams	Glenn	McDowell	Richardson
USC	Te’o-Nesheim	Ta’amu	Elisara	Crichton	Savannah	Butler	Foster	Williams	Glenn	McDowell	Richardson
at Stanford	Te’o-Nesheim	Ta’amu	Elisara	Crichton	Savannah	Butler	Foster	Williams	Glenn	Trufant	Richardson
at Notre Dame	Te’o-Nesheim	Ta’amu	Elisara	Crichton	Dennison	Butler	Foster	Williams	Glenn	Trufant	Richardson
ARIZONA	Te’o-Nesheim	Ta’amu	Elisara	Jones	Savannah	Butler	Foster	Aiyewa	Fellner	Trufant	Richardson
at Arizona State	Te’o-Nesheim	Ta’amu	Elisara	Jones	Savannah	Butler	Foster	Aiyewa	Williams	Trufant	Long
OREGON	Te’o-Nesheim	Ta’amu	Thompson	Jones	Savannah	Butler	Foster	Williams	Fellner	Trufant	Long
at UCLA	Pulu	Ta’amu	Te’o-Nesheim	Crichton	Dennison	Butler	Foster	Williams	Wells	Trufant	Long
at Oregon State	Te’o-Nesheim	Ta’amu	Matthews	Jones	Dennison	Butler	Foster	Williams	Fellner	Trufant	Long
WASHINGTON STATE	Te’o-Nesheim	Thompson	Elisara	Jones	Dennison	Butler	Foster	Williams	Wells	Trufant	Long
CALIFORNIA	Te’o-Nesheim	Ta’amu	Thompson	Jones	Dennison	Butler	Foster	Williams	Wells	Trufant	Long

== Rankings ==
Ranking movements Legend: ██ Increase in ranking ██ Decrease in ranking — = Not ranked
	Week															
Poll	Pre	1	2	3	4	5	6	7	8	9	10	11	12	13	14	Final
AP	—	—	—	24	—	—	—	—	—	—	—	—	—	—	—	
Coaches	—	—	—	—	—	—	—	—	—	—	—	—	—	—	—	
Harris	Not released				—	—	—	—	—	—	—	—	—	—	—	Not released
BCS	Not released							—	—	—	—	—	—	—	—	Not released

== Players in the NFL ==
The following UW Huskies were selected in the 2010 NFL draft:

Player	Position	Round	Pick	NFL club
Donald Butler	LB	3	79	San Diego Chargers
Daniel Te'o-Nesheim	DE	3	86	Philadelphia Eagles

== Award winners ==
=== Academics ===
Washington placed seven players on the 2009 Pac-10 All-Academic Team

- DB Victor Aiyewa, Jr. 3.36 GPA in Sociology, First Team
- RB Paul Homer, Sr. 3.19 GPA in Biology, Second Team
- DB Greg Walker, RFr. 3.45 GPA in Pre-Engineering, Second Team
- LB Cort Dennison, So. Honorable Mention
- PK Erik Folk, So. Honorable Mention
- OT Cody Habben, Jr. Honorable Mention
- OG Morgan Rosborough, Sr. Honorable Mention

=== Athletics ===
Washington placed ten players on the 2009 Pac-10 All-Conference Team

- WR Jermaine Kearse, So., Second Team Offense
- DL Daniel Te'o-Nesheim, Sr., Second Team Defense
- LB Donald Butler, Sr., Second Team Defense
- WR Devin Aguilar, So. Honorable Mention
- OLB Mason Foster, Jr. Honorable Mention
- OG Senio Kelemete, So. Honorable Mention
- QB Jake Locker, Jr. Honorable Mention
- TB Chris Polk, Fr. Honorable Mention
- C Ryan Tolar, Jr. Honorable Mention
- CB Desmond Trufant, Fr. Honorable Mention
