= Erik Folk =

American football player (born 1989)

No. 17
- Position: Kicker

Personal information
- Born: January 26, 1989 (age 37); Woodland Hills, California, U.S.
- Listed height: 5 ft 11 in (1.80 m)
- Listed weight: 199 lb (90 kg)

Career information
- High school: Sherman Oaks (CA) Notre Dame
- College: Washington
- NFL draft: 2012: undrafted

Career history
- Atlanta Falcons (2012)*
- * Offseason or practice squad member only

Erik Folk (born January 26, 1989) is a former American college football placekicker who played for the University of Washington. He is most remembered for kicking game-winning field goals to beat USC in 2009 and 2010.

He went undrafted in the 2012 NFL draft, and was signed as a free agent by the Atlanta Falcons before being released during the preseason.

== Early life ==
Folk helped Sherman Oaks Notre Dame High School to an 11-1 record and a Serra League championship as a senior in 2006. The team finished the regular season 10-0 before beating Dana Hills, 45-10, in the first round of the playoffs, subsequently lost to Long Beach Poly, 31-21, the following week. Folk's team finished as the No. 6 team in the state, according to MaxPreps. Los Angeles Daily News second-team all-area kicker and other awards and accomplishments including, CalHiSports all-state third-team, PrepStar all-region selection, booted 53-of-53 PATs and seven field goals as a senior, kicked a 56-yarder vs. Birmingham High in 2006.

He also kicked a 50-yarder vs. Canyon, the Knights spent part of 2005 season ranked No. 1 in the state before falling to Dominguez in the CIF Southern Section Western Division final.

== College career ==
During the 2009 season, it was Folk’s 22-yarder with three seconds to play that made the difference in a 16-13 upset win over No. 3 USC.

Folk repeated his last-second heroics against No. 18 USC the following year, hitting a 32-yard game-winning field goal. He was named Pac-10 Special Teams player of the week on October 4, 2010.

== Professional career ==
Pre-draft measurables
Height	Weight	Bench press
5 ft 10 1/2 in (1.79 m)	195 lb (88 kg)	14 reps
All values from Pro Day

On June 18, 2012, Folk was signed as an undrafted free agent by the Atlanta Falcons. in 2012, but was released before the regular season.

== Personal life ==
Folk was born to Anton and Kathryn Folk. He is the younger brother of Atlanta Falcons kicker Nick Folk, who was a first-team All-Pac-10 punter in 2006. He also has another brother, Greg Folk, who played soccer at UCLA.

== See also ==
- Washington Huskies football statistical leaders
