= Hauʻoli Kikaha =

American football player (born 1992)

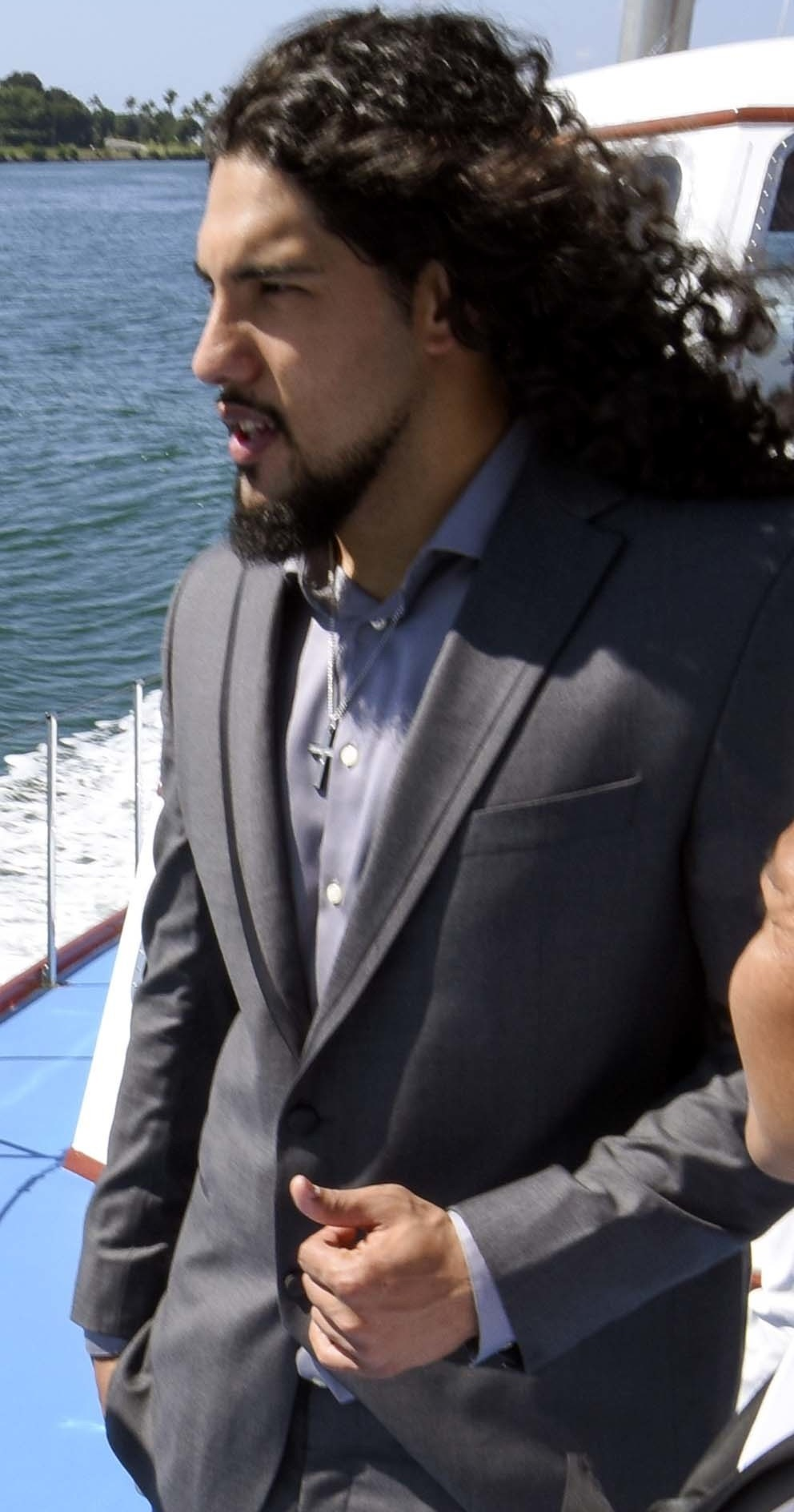

No. 45, 44
- Position: Linebacker

Personal information
- Born: July 24, 1992 (age 34); Hauʻula, Hawaii, U.S.
- Listed height: 6 ft 3 in (1.91 m)
- Listed weight: 246 lb (112 kg)

Career information
- High school: Kahuku (Kahuku, Hawaii)
- College: Washington (2010–2014)
- NFL draft: 2015: 2nd round, 44th overall pick

Career history
- New Orleans Saints (2015–2017); Dallas Renegades (2020)

Awards and highlights
- Unanimous All-American (2014); First-team All-Pac-12 (2014); Second-team All-Pac-12 (2013)

Career NFL statistics
- Total tackles: 62
- Sacks: 8
- Forced fumbles: 4
- Fumble recoveries: 1
- Stats at Pro Football Reference

Hauʻoli Kikaha (born July 24, 1992) is an American former professional football player who was a linebacker in the National Football League (NFL). He played college football for the Washington Huskies, earning unanimous All-American honors in 2014. He was selected by the New Orleans Saints in the second round of the 2015 NFL draft.

== Early life ==
Kikaha attended Kahuku High & Intermediate School in Kahuku, Hawaii. He is from Hauʻula, Hawaii. He played defensive end and tight end. As a senior in 2009, he was named Honolulu Star-Bulletin's defensive player of the year. Kikaha was rated as a three-star recruit by Rivals.com. In January 2010, he committed to the University of Washington to play college football.

== College career ==
Kikaha played in all 13 games as a true freshman in 2010, making seven starts. He finished the season with 49 tackles and three sacks. He started the first four games of his sophomore season in 2011, before tearing his ACL causing him to miss the rest of the season. Prior to 2012, Kikaha tore his ACL for a second time, causing him again to miss the season. Kikaha returned in 2013 and started every game for the Huskies. He finished the season with 13 sacks and 70 tackles. As a senior in 2014, Kikaha broke Daniel Te’o-Nesheim school career sack record of 30. In 2014 as a result of being named a first-team All-American by the Associated Press, Football Writers Association of America, American Football Coaches Association, the Walter Camp Football Foundation and The Sporting News, Kikaha became the sixth unanimous All-American in school history.

== Professional career ==
=== New Orleans Saints ===
Kikaha was drafted in the second round of the 2015 NFL draft, 44th overall. After having a strong training camp and pre-season, he began the season as the starting outside linebacker for the Saints. He recorded his first career sack in Week 2 when the Saints played the Tampa Bay Buccaneers. Kikaha sat out Week 9 with an ankle injury and then only played 8 snaps in Week 10. After a Week 11 bye, he came back healthy, recording three tackles in Week 12. Kikaha finished his rookie season with 52 tackles, 4.0 sacks, and four forced fumbles.

Kikaha tore his ACL on June 9, 2016, and was ruled out for the 2016 season. He played in 12 games in 2017, recording 10 tackles and four sacks. He suffered an ankle injury in Week 16 and was placed on injured reserve on December 28, 2017.

On September 1, 2018, Kikaha was waived by the Saints.

=== Dallas Renegades ===
On October 15, 2019, he was selected by the Dallas Renegades of the XFL in the 2020 XFL draft. He retired from football three weeks into the XFL season on February 25, 2020.

== Personal life ==
Kikaha was known as Hauʻoli Jamora before changing his name in 2013. He is of Native Hawaiian descent.

== See also ==
- Washington Huskies football statistical leaders
