= 2009 Emerald Bowl =

Boston College Eagles	USC Trojans
(8–4)	(8–4)
ACC	Pac-10
13	24
Head coach: Frank Spaziani	Head coach: Pete Carroll
	AP / Coaches / BCS; NR / NR / 24
	1	2	3	4	Total
Boston College	0	13	0	0	13
USC	7	7	3	7	24
- Date: December 26, 2009
- Season: 2009
- Stadium: AT&T Park
- Location: San Francisco, California
- MVP: Offense: Damian Williams (WR USC); Defense: Luke Kuechly (LB Boston College)
- Referee: Dan Romeo (Mountain West Conference)
- Attendance: 40,121
- Payout: US$900,000 (Pac-10); US$750,000 (ACC)

United States TV coverage
- Network: ESPN
- Announcers: Joe Tessitore; Rod Gilmore; Todd Harris
- Nielsen ratings: 4.6

The 2009 Emerald Bowl was the eighth edition of the college football bowl game, and was played at AT&T Park in San Francisco, California. The game started at 5:00 p.m. PST on Saturday, December 26, 2009. The game was telecast on ESPN. USC defeated Boston College 24–13.

The presenting sponsor of the 2009 Emerald Bowl was Diamond Foods, promoting its Emerald Nuts brand of snack foods. The company had served as title sponsor of the game for all eight years of the bowl's existence.

== Teams ==
This marked the first time USC had played in the bowl. The Trojans had played in a BCS bowl game each of the past seven years and had hopes to make it back there again this season before dropping three of their last five games. First, Oregon defeated USC 47–20, USC's worst loss under Pete Carroll up to that time. This was followed by an even worse loss against Stanford in the Coliseum by a 55–21 margin that eliminated USC from Rose Bowl contention for the first time in seven years as well as its worst loss in 43 years while Stanford's 55 points were the most points ever scored by an opponent against USC. USC's final regular season game was a 21–17 loss to Arizona. USC fell out of the AP Top 25 for the first time in eight years after the loss to Wildcats.

Boston College was making its 11th straight bowl appearance. The Eagles were the first team to play in the Emerald Bowl twice, beating Colorado State 35–21 in the 2003 San Francisco Bowl (the former name of the Emerald Bowl). Boston College went 8–1 in bowl games in the first decade of the 21st century. This was the third meeting between the two schools and the first one in the post-season. USC had won both games in the series, a 23–17 victory in Los Angeles in 1987 and a 34–7 win in Chestnut Hill in 1988.

== Game summary ==
USC wore their home cardinal jerseys, and Boston College wore their away white jerseys.

USC freshman quarterback Matt Barkley threw touchdown passes to Stanley Havili on the Trojans first two possessions and added a touchdown run in the fourth quarter. Barkley finished the game with a total of 350 yards passing. Of his 350 yards, Damian Williams accounted for 189 of them on 12 catches. Williams was named the game's MVP for his efforts. Boston College was led by tailback Montel Harris, who rushed for 102 yards and also added a touchdown run.

=== Scoring summary ===
Scoring Play	Score
1st Quarter
USC - Stanley Havili 53-yard pass from Matt Barkley (Jordan Congdon kick), 6:01	USC 7–0
2nd Quarter
USC - Stanley Havili 5-yard pass from Matt Barkley (Jordan Congdon kick), 12:36	USC 14–0
BC - Montel Harris 7-yard rush (Steve Aponavicius missed kick), 9:54	USC 14–6
BC - Rich Gunnell 61-yard pass from Dave Shinskie (Steve Aponavicius kick), 3:48	USC 14–13
3rd Quarter
USC - Jordan Congdon 38-yard field goal, 9:08	USC 17–13
4th Quarter
USC - Matt Barkley 1-yard rush (Jordan Congdon kick), 11:53	USC 24–13
