= Rocky Seto =

American football player and coach (born 1976)

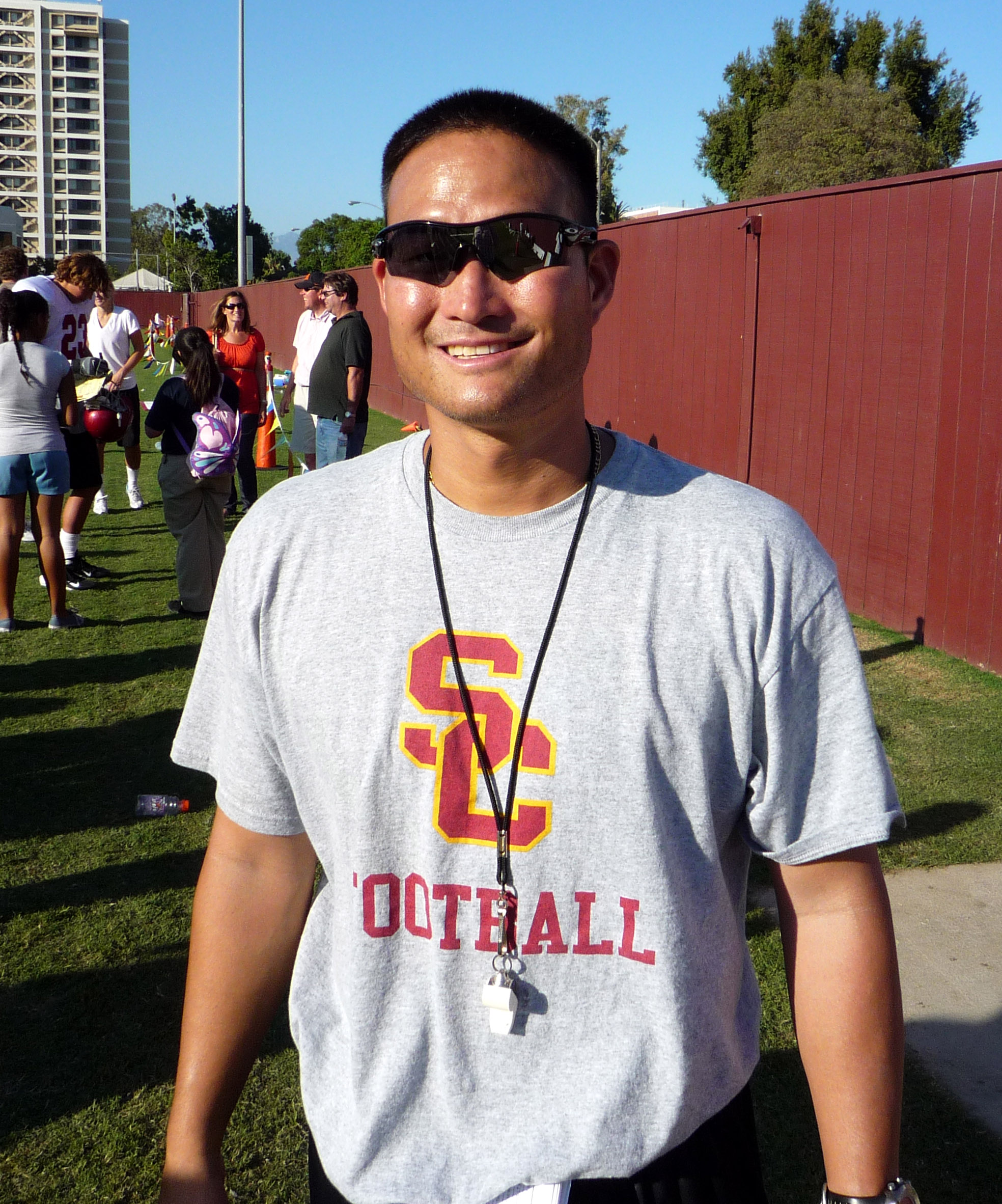
- Seto during his time on the USC coaching staff

Personal information
- Born: March 12, 1976 (age 50); Los Angeles, California, U.S.

Career information
- College: Mt. San Antonio College, Univ. of Southern California

Career history
- USC (volunteer assistant) (1999); USC (graduate assistant) (2000–2002); USC (safeties) (2002–2003); USC (linebackers) (2004–2005); USC (secondary) (2006–2008); USC (defensive coordinator) (2009); Seattle Seahawks (quality control/defense) (2010); Seattle Seahawks (assistant defensive backs/safeties) (2011); Seattle Seahawks (defensive passing game coordinator) (2012–2014); Seattle Seahawks (assistant head coach/defense) (2015–2016)

Awards and highlights
- Super Bowl champion (XLVIII); AP college football national champion (2003, 2004); 3× Pac-10 Conference champions (2002-2008); 2007 Emerald Bowl champion; 4× Rose Bowl champion (2004, 2006**, 2007, 2008, 2009); Orange Bowl champion (2003, 2005**); **denotes NCAA vacated titles

Haruki Rocky Seto (born March 12, 1975), often referred to as Rocky Seto, is an American former football coach; he last served as the assistant head coach for the NFL's Seattle Seahawks.

In 2017, Seto announced that he was leaving the football coaching industry to become a full-time pastor in California. He is currently serving as the Senior Pastor for Evergreen Baptist Church of San Gabriel Valley.

== Early life ==
Seto was born in Los Angeles, California; he is Japanese-American Nisei, son of Issei parents. His father runs a gardening business and grew up going to USC football games; both father and son were fans of the Trojans. Seto attended Arcadia High School, where he played numerous positions; he described himself as an "average player".

== College career ==
Seto began his college playing career at Mount San Antonio College, a junior college in the Los Angeles area. He chose the college so he could play for head coach Bill Fisk, who was an All-American at USC. Seto was a fullback and defensive end during the 1995 and 1996 seasons, but mostly played on special teams.

In 1997, he transferred to the University of Southern California, hoping to walk-on to the football team. Although he was initially told he would be able to walk-on, he stopped getting mail from the program. Concerned, Seto staged an "accidental" meeting with head coach John Robinson who sorted out his situation, allowing him to walk-on. Seto was a reserve linebacker for the Trojans in 1997, seeing action on the scout team. In 1998, new head coach Paul Hackett awarded him an athletic scholarship, and he was later awarded USC's Black Shirt (scout team) Defensive Player of the Year Award for that season.

Seto received an Associate's degree in general studies from Mt. San Antonio Junior College in 1997, a bachelor's degree in exercise science from USC in 1999, and a master's degree in public administration from USC in 2001. Once he had gained his bachelor's degree, Seto initially planned to attend graduate school at USC to become a physical therapist. Although he had already placed his deposit, he found out about the possibility of a volunteer assistant position with the football program and opted to enter coaching.

== Coaching career ==
After playing for the Trojans, Seto joined the coaching staff in 1999 as a volunteer assistant under then-head coach Paul Hackett, working with the defense and special teams. In 2000, he served as an administrative graduate assistant, and with the arrival of head coach Pete Carroll in 2001, he became a graduate assistant involved in the defense, working with the general defense in 2001 and safeties in 2002. In 2003, he became a full coach, in charge of safeties, and from 2004 to 2005 he coached linebackers. From 2006 to 2010, he coached the USC secondary. In 2008, former college teammate Kris Richard joined the staff as a graduate assistant.

In 2006, Seto turned down a job to coach the secondary of the NFL's Buffalo Bills. When USC offensive coordinator Steve Sarkisian departed to take the head coaching position at Washington in late 2008, he offered Seto the position of defensive coordinator. He opted to stay at USC and continue coaching the secondary, along with a raise and the additional title of assistant head coach for defense. On January 7, 2009, Carroll promoted Seto to defensive coordinator.

Seto was not retained when Lane Kiffin became the head coach at USC. He was replaced by Kiffin's father, Monte.

In 2010, Seto joined Pete Carroll's coaching staff for the NFL's Seattle Seahawks. He won his first Super Bowl title when the Seahawks defeated the Denver Broncos in Super Bowl XLVIII.

In 2015, the Seahawks announced that Seto had been promoted to assistant head coach/defense.

In January 2017, Seto announced that he was leaving his position with the Seahawks to join the Baptist ministry. He now serves as a pastor in La Puente, California.

== Personal life ==
Seto married Sharla Marie (Chiang), who played soccer for USC and was on the Women of Troy's 1998 Pac-10 championship squad; and was originally from Seattle. They have four children together.

Seto is a devout Christian and considers his church community an important aspect of his life. He was featured in an episode of Trinity Broadcasting Network's More Than Conquerors magazine show, which profiles Christian sports figures and shares their testimony.

Seto has participated in an exchange program with Waseda University in Tokyo, Japan to help teach American football coaching and playing strategy.

Seto has been serving as the Senior Pastor of Evergreen Baptist Church of San Gabriel Valley since 2017.
