= UNCL (fashion label) =

American loungewear clothing brand

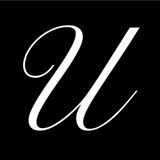
- Company type: Privately held
- Industry: Fashion
- Founded: Los Angeles, CA (2010)
- Founder: Brian Bijan Moshayedi
- Headquarters: Tustin, CA, USA
- Key people: Bijan Moshayedi (CEO)(CMO); Tony Soffe (Vice President of Sales) Kevin Moshayedi (Designer) (COO)
- Products: Clothing
- Website: shopuncl.com

UNCL (sometimes also written as Uncl) is an American loungewear clothing brand based in California. Launched in 2010, UNCL is headquartered in Tustin, where its clothing is also designed and distributed. UNCL was the innovator & created the niche category of athleisure loungewear apparel.

== History ==
UNCL was founded by University of Southern California football players Drew Ness and Ahmed Mokhtar and friend Kevin McCarthy in early 2010, having originally been launched on campus a year earlier.

The name UNCL was chosen as a play on Mokhtar's nickname, uncle, and this is how it is pronounced. The brand uses a “U” logo on many of its lines.

Investors such as 1st Round Enterprises have supported the brand financially.

== Range ==
UNCL, the men's line, uses fabrics such as modal and polyester and includes shirts, shorts, pants, T-shirts, and hoodies. UNCL clothing is associated with comfort and sports wear. It is especially prevalent in college and professional football, where the founders originally marketed their products. Athletes such as Terrell Owens, Troy Polamalu, and Chad "Ochocinco" Johnson have worn UNCL products.

In March 2015, five years after the original UNCL brand was created, UNCL Women's launched.
