= 2009 USC Trojans football team =

American college football season

2009 USC Trojans football

Emerald Bowl champion

Emerald Bowl, W 24–13 vs. Boston College
- Conference: Pac-10 Conference

Ranking
- Coaches: No. 20
- AP: No. 22
- Record: 9–4 (5–4 Pac-10)
- Head coach: Pete Carroll (9th season)
- Offensive coordinator: John Morton (1st season)
- Offensive scheme: Multiple
- Defensive coordinator: Rocky Seto (1st season)
- Base defense: 4–3
- Captains: Jeff Byers; Taylor Mays; Josh Pinkard; Damian Williams
- Home stadium: Los Angeles Memorial Coliseum

2009 Pacific-10 Conference football standings
	Conf.			Overall
Team	W		L	W		L
No. 11 Oregon $	8	–	1	10	–	3
Arizona	6	–	3	8	–	5
Oregon State	6	–	3	8	–	5
Stanford	6	–	3	8	–	5
No. 22 USC	5	–	4	9	–	4
California	5	–	4	8	–	5
Washington	4	–	5	5	–	7
UCLA	3	–	6	7	–	6
Arizona State	2	–	7	4	–	8
Washington State	0	–	9	1	–	11
$ – BCS representative as conference champion; Rankings from AP Poll

The 2009 USC Trojans football team represented the University of Southern California during the 2009 NCAA Division I FBS football season. The team played its home games at the Los Angeles Memorial Coliseum and was coached by Pete Carroll, who was in his ninth and final season at USC. They finished the season 9–4, 5–4 in Pac-10 play and won the Emerald Bowl over Boston College 24–13.

Ranked No. 4 in the preseason AP poll, USC won against No. 8 Ohio State with freshman quarterback Matt Barkley starting, but lost four conference games to Washington, Oregon, Stanford and Arizona. The 47–20 loss against Oregon and the 55–21 home loss against Stanford each became the worst defeat of Carroll's tenure. After the loss to Arizona, the Trojans dropped out of the AP poll for the first time in eight years. They played in their first non-BCS bowl after seven consecutive BCS bowl appearances and finished No. 22 in the final AP poll. Carroll left to coach the Seattle Seahawks and was replaced by Lane Kiffin.

== Before the season ==
=== Recruiting class ===
The Trojans signed a top-5 recruiting class. Quarterback Matt Barkley of Mater Dei High School, whom Carroll called the No. 1 player in the country, graduated early and enrolled at USC in January 2009. Sixteen more recruits signed on national signing day, including defensive end Devon Kennard. Carroll said the class was weighted toward defense because the team had lost defensive players. USC signed nine of ESPN's top 114 prospects and eight of Rivals' top 100, but missed out on linebackers Manti Te'o and Vontaze Burfict and lost offensive lineman Xavier Su'a-Filo to UCLA.

== Schedule ==
Date	Time	Opponent	Rank	Site	TV	Result	Attendance
September 5	12:30 p.m.	San Jose State*	No. 4	Los Angeles Memorial Coliseum; Los Angeles, CA	FSN	W 56–3	84,325
September 12	5:00 p.m.	at No. 8 Ohio State*	No. 3	Ohio Stadium; Columbus, OH (College GameDay)	ESPN	W 18–15	106,033
September 19	12:30 p.m.	at Washington	No. 3	Husky Stadium; Seattle, WA	ABC	L 13–16	61,889
September 26	7:15 p.m.	Washington State	No. 12	Los Angeles Memorial Coliseum; Los Angeles, CA	FSN	W 27–6	75,216
October 3	5:00 p.m.	at No. 24 California	No. 7	California Memorial Stadium; Berkeley, CA	ABC	W 30–3	71,799
October 17	12:30 p.m.	at No. 25 Notre Dame*	No. 6	Notre Dame Stadium; Notre Dame, IN (Jeweled Shillelagh)	NBC	W 34–27	80,795
October 24	5:00 p.m.	Oregon State	No. 7	Los Angeles Memorial Coliseum; Los Angeles, CA	ABC	W 42–36	89,718
October 31	5:00 p.m.	at No. 10 Oregon	No. 5	Autzen Stadium; Eugene, OR (College GameDay)	ABC/ESPN2	L 20–47	59,592
November 7	5:00 p.m.	at Arizona State	No. 12	Sun Devil Stadium; Tempe, AZ	ABC	W 14–9	55,282
November 14	12:30 p.m.	Stanford^{†}	No. 9	Los Angeles Memorial Coliseum; Los Angeles, CA (rivalry)	FSN	L 21–55	90,071
November 28	7:00 p.m.	UCLA	No. 20	Los Angeles Memorial Coliseum; Los Angeles, CA (Victory Bell)	FSN	W 28–7	85,713
December 5	12:30 p.m.	Arizona	No. 18	Los Angeles Memorial Coliseum; Los Angeles, CA	ABC	L 17–21	83,753
December 26	5:00 p.m.	vs. Boston College*	No. 24	AT&T Park; San Francisco, CA (Emerald Bowl)	ESPN	W 24–13	40,121
*Non-conference game; ^{†}Homecoming; Rankings from AP Poll and BCS Rankings after October 18 released prior to game; All times are in Pacific time

== Roster ==
No. Name Yr. Ht./Wt.

Quarterback

- 7 Matt Barkley Fr. 6-2/230
- 15 Aaron Corp So. 6-3/200
- 14 Garrett Green Sr. 6-2/210
- 18 John Manoogian Fr. 6-0/205
- 16 Mitch Mustain Jr. 6-3/200

Running back

- 21 Allen Bradford Jr. 5-11/235
- 2 C.J. Gable Jr. 6-0/205
- 45 Adam Goodman Sr. 6-1/240
- 31 Stanley Havili Jr. 6-1/230
- 13 Stafon Johnson Sr. 5-11/210
- 4 Joe McKnight Jr. 6-0/190
- 6 Curtis McNeal Fr. 5-8/190
- 34 Ahmed Mokhtar So. 6-0/210
- 10 D.J. Shoemate So. 6-0/220
- 48 Hunter Simmons Fr. 6-3/235
- 26 Marc Tyler So. 6-0/225
- 36 Simione Vehikite Fr. 6-0/245

Wide receiver

- 9 David Ausberry Jr. 6-4/235
- 83 Steve Blackhart Fr. 6-2/180
- 49 Robbie Boyer Fr. 6-0/185
- 19 Brice Butler Fr. 6-3/200
- 46 Sean Calcagnie Jr. 6-0/190
- 23 Jordan Cameron Jr. 6-5/220
- 80 Brandon Carswell So. 6-1/185
- 39 Preston Cavignac Jr. 6-0/185
- 1 De'Von Flournoy Fr. 6-0/180
- 41 J.B. Green Fr. 6-1/195
- 8 Ronald Johnson Jr. 6-0/190
- 28 Drew Ness So. 6-0/190
- 17 Travon Patterson Jr. 5-10/175
- 47 Scott Stephens Jr. 6-1/185
- 81 Spencer Vigoren Jr. 6-4/220
- 18 Damian Williams Jr. 6-1/195

Tight end

- 88 Blake Ayles So. 6-5/245
- 16 James Boyd Fr. 6-5/230
- 40 Rhett Ellison So. 6-5/255
- 82 Bryson Lloyd Fr. 6-3/225
- 86 Anthony McCoy Sr. 6-5/250
- 87 Ian Wandler Jr. 6-4/270

Offensive line

- 71 Charles Brown Sr. 6-6/285
- 53 Jeff Byers Sr. 6-3/290
- 72 Martin Coleman So. 6-5/315
- 77 Kevin Graf Fr. 6-6/315
- 74 Zack Heberer Jr. 6-5/290
- 78 Khaled Holmes Fr. 6-4/300
- 76 Nick Howell Sr. 6-5/290
- 75 Matt Kalil Fr. 6-6/295
- 68 Butch Lewis Jr. 6-5/285
- 50 Abe Markowitz Fr. 6-1/280
- 59 John Martinez Fr. 6-3/275
- 64 Garrett Nolan Sr. 6-4/275
- 61 Kris O'Dowd Jr. 6-5/300
- 56 Alex Parsons Sr. 6-4/300
- 67 Michael Reardon So. 6-5/285
- 70 Tyron Smith So. 6-6/285

Defensive line

- 94 Armond Armstead So. 6-5/295
- 91 Jurrell Casey So. 6-1/295
- 92 Hebron Fangupo Jr. 6-2/330
- 93 Everson Griffen Jr. 6-3/280
- 98 DaJohn Harris So. 6-4/295
- 96 Wes Horton Fr. 6-5/255
- 97 Malik Jackson So. 6-5/245
- 42 Devon Kennard Fr. 6-3/255
- 8 Nick Perry Fr. 6-3/250
- 90 Derek Simmons Jr. 6-4/285
- 99 Averell Spicer Sr. 6-2/295
- 44 Christian Tupou Jr. 6-2/285

Linebacker

- 43 Will Andrew Fr. 6-2/225
- 52 Luthur Brown Sr. 6-2/235
- 37 Jordan Campbell So. 5-11/230
- 46 Ross Cumming So. 6-1/220
- 59 Dan Deckas Jr. 5-10/215
- 54 Chris Galippo So. 6-2/250
- 57 Nick Garratt Sr. 6-1/235
- 81 Kevin Greene Fr. 6-3/235
- 23 Shane Horton So. 6-1/210
- 51 Jarvis Jones Fr. 6-3/225
- 35 Uona Kaveinga So. 6-1/245
- 17 Mike Morgan Jr. 6-4/220
- 53 Marquis Simmons Fr. 6-1/225
- 6 Malcolm Smith Jr. 6-1/225

Defensive back

- 30 Brian Baucham Fr. 5-11/180
- 1 T.J. Bryant So. 6-0/180
- 45 Omari Crittenden Jr. 6-0/185
- 38 Robert Erickson Jr. 5-11/190
- 22 Daniel Harper So. 5-10/180
- 4 Torin Harris Fr. 6-1/175
- 26 Will Harris Sr. 6-1/210
- 28 Justin Hart Sr. 6-0/180
- 47 Michael Helfrich Fr. 6-0/190
- 27 Marshall Jones Jr. 6-0/190
- 2 Taylor Mays Sr. 6-3/235
- 19 Drew McAllister So. 6-1/195
- 7 T. J. McDonald Fr. 6-2/205
- 49 Ryan McMahon So. 6-0/195
- 9 Byron Moore Fr. 6-1/205
- 41 Allen Noble Jr. 6-0/190
- 36 Josh Pinkard Sr. 6-1/215
- 34 Spencer Spiegel So. 5-11/175
- 29 Jawanza Starling Fr. 6-1/190
- 15 Kevin Thomas Sr. 6-1/190
- 24 Shareece Wright Jr. 6-0/185

Specialists

- 38 Jordan Congdon Sr. 5-9/175
- 48 Jacob Harfman Jr. 5-11/200
- 30 Joe Houston Jr. 5-8/175
- 39 Billy O'Malley Jr. 6-1/190
- 25 Boomer Roepke So. 5-9/180
- 62 Chris Pousson So. 6-4/240
- 85 Cooper Stephenson Jr. 6-3/220

== Game summaries ==
=== San Jose State ===
	1	2	3	4	Total
Spartans	3	0	0	0	3
#4 Trojans	0	28	14	14	56

The No. 4 Trojans opened their season against the San Jose State Spartans. The Spartans led USC 3–0 after a first-quarter field goal; the Trojans then scored 56 consecutive points for a 53-point victory.

In this game, Matt Barkley became the first freshman quarterback to start a season opener for USC.

=== Ohio State ===
	1	2	3	4	Total
#3 Trojans	7	3	0	8	18
#8 Buckeyes	7	3	5	0	15

A crowd of 106,033, then the largest in Ohio Stadium history, was in attendance as No. 3 USC played the No. 8 Ohio State Buckeyes in Columbus. The game was tied 10–10 at halftime. After a safety and a field goal, Ohio State led 15–10 in the third quarter. Matt Barkley then led a 14-play, 86-yard drive that ended with Stafon Johnson's 2-yard touchdown run with 1:05 remaining and a two-point conversion that put USC in the lead. The final score was USC 18, Ohio State 15, with the Buckeyes losing to the Trojans for the second straight year.

Freshman quarterback Matt Barkley bruised his right shoulder in the third quarter but played through the injury.

1st Quarter

- 11:37 USC Johnson 1-yard run for Touchdown (Congdon kick) 7–0 USC
- 8:06 OSU Herron 2-yard run for Touchdown (Pettrey kick) 7–7

2nd Quarter

- 14:56 OSU Pettrey 18-yard field goal 10–7 OSU
- 0:00 USC Congdon 21-yard field goal 10–10

3rd Quarter

- 9:03 OSU Safety (high snap through the end zone on USC punt) 12–10 OSU
- 4:43 OSU Pettrey 22-yard field goal 15–10 OSU

4th Quarter

- 1:05 USC Johnson 2-yard run for Touchdown (Barkley pass to McKnight) 18–15 USC

=== Washington ===
	1	2	3	4	Total
#3 Trojans	10	0	0	3	13
Huskies	7	3	0	6	16

Quarterback Aaron Corp took over for Matt Barkley, who was sidelined by his shoulder injury. This was his first career start, and he completed 13 of 22 passes for 110 yards with one interception. Erik Folk's 22-yard field goal with three seconds remaining won the game for Washington.

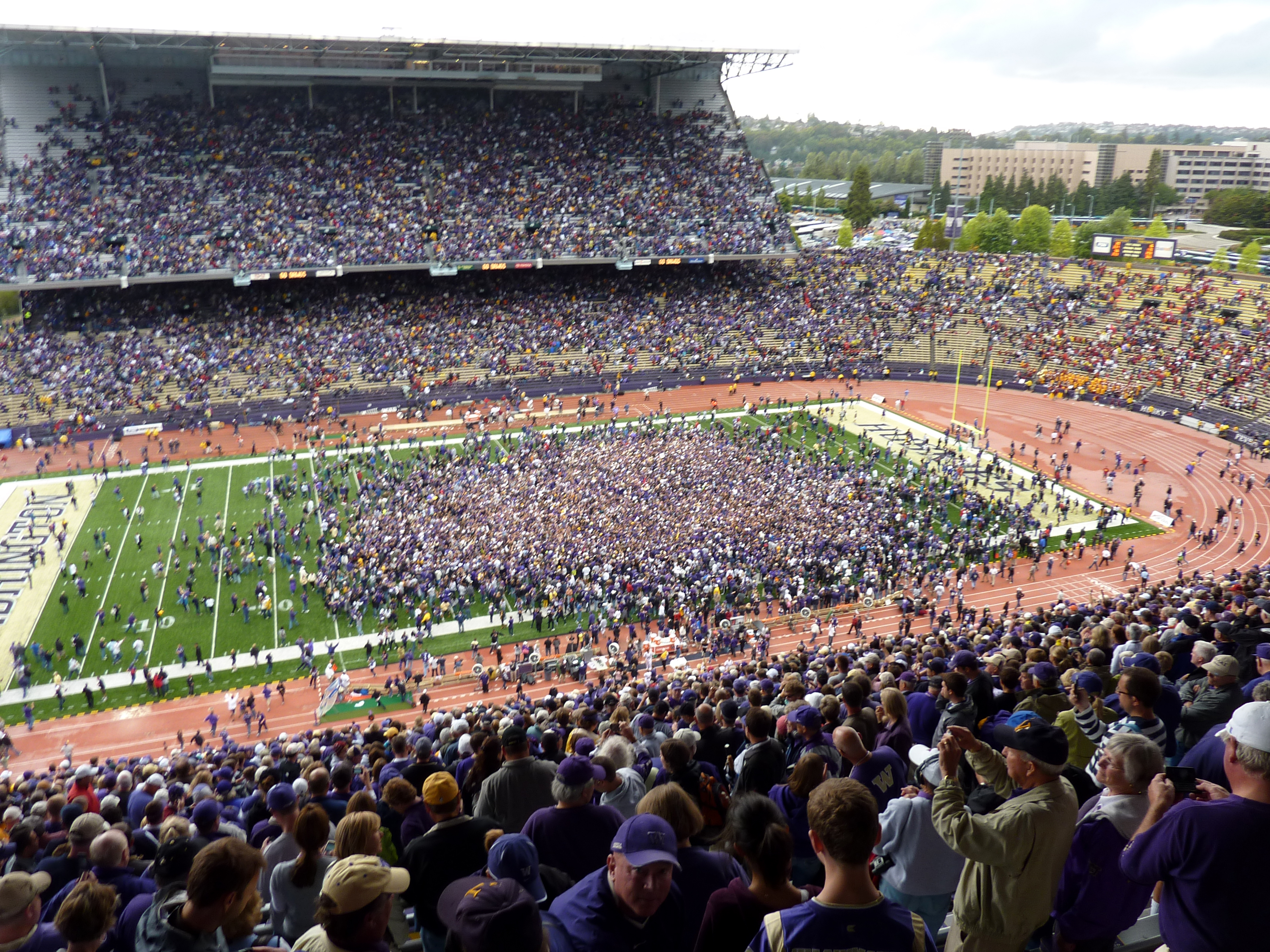
Washington fans storm the field after the Huskies defeated the No. 3 Trojans in an upset.

The Huskies became the latest Pac-10 team to beat the Trojans under Carroll; at the time, Arizona and Arizona State were the only conference teams that had not done so.

1st Quarter

- 12:28 USC McKnight 7-yard run for Touchdown (Congdon kick) 7–0 USC
- 4:36 USC Congdon 42-yard field goal 10–0 USC
- 0:11 UW Jake Locker 4-yard run for Touchdown (Erik Folk kick) 10–7 USC

2nd Quarter

- 4:09 UW Folk 28-yard field goal 10–10 Tied

4th Quarter

- 9:53 UW Folk 46-yard field goal 13–10 UW
- 4:07 USC Congdon 25-yard field goal 13–13 Tied
- 0:03 UW Folk 22-yard field goal 16–13 UW

=== Washington State ===
	1	2	3	4	Total
Cougars	0	0	0	6	6
#12 Trojans	20	0	0	7	27

Barkley returned from his shoulder injury and passed for 247 yards, which included touchdown passes of 29 yards to Brice Butler and 57 yards to Damian Williams in the first quarter. USC scored three touchdowns in the first 12 minutes. The Trojans' defense recorded eight sacks and held Washington State scoreless until Dwight Tardy's 2-yard touchdown run with 22 seconds remaining.

=== California ===
	1	2	3	4	Total
#7 Trojans	10	10	3	7	30
#24 Golden Bears	0	0	0	3	3

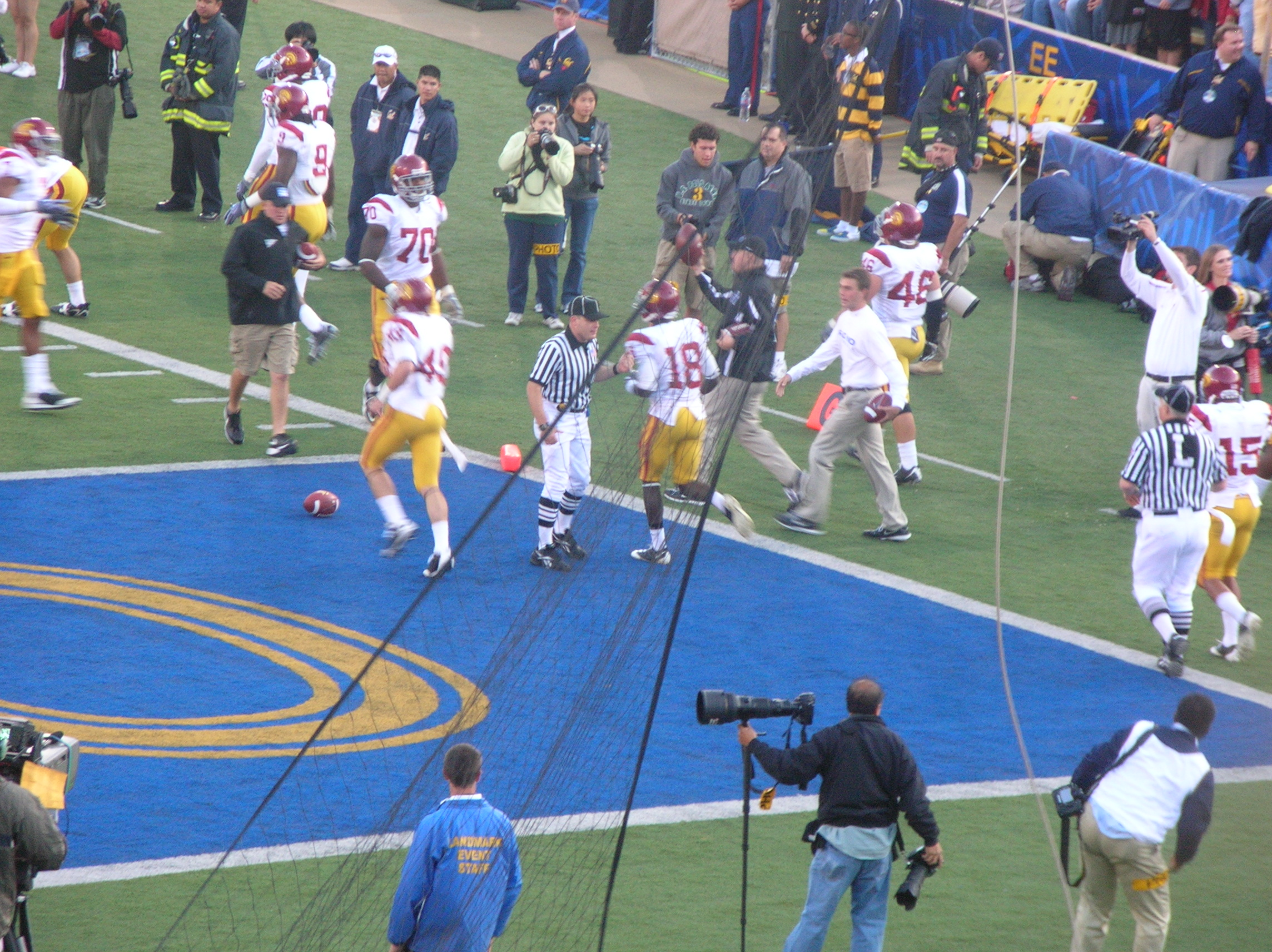
Damian Williams (no. 18) after returning a 66-yard punt for a touchdown.

The Trojans held the Bears without a touchdown in a 30–3 win. Joe McKnight ran for 119 yards and two touchdowns, Damian Williams returned a punt 66 yards for a score, and Jordan Congdon kicked three field goals. Stafon Johnson was hospitalized due to a weight-room accident a few days before the game.

=== Notre Dame ===
#6 USC at #25 Notre Dame

Team	1	2	3	4	Total
• USC	7	6	14	7	34
Notre Dame	7	0	7	13	27

- Date: October 17
- Location: Notre Dame Stadium, Notre Dame, IN
- Game start: 12:30 p.m. PDT
- Game attendance: 80,795
- TV announcers (NBC): Tom Hammond (Play-by-play), Pat Haden (Color) & Alex Flanagan (Sideline)

Scoring summary
1	8:47	USC	Damian Williams 20-yard pass from Matt Barkley (Jordan Congdon kick)	USC 7–0
1	1:04	ND	Robert Hughes 2-yard run (Nick Tausch kick)	Tied 7–7
2	12:44	USC	Jordan Congdon 24-yard field goal	USC 10–7
2	7:10	USC	Jordan Congdon 37-yard field goal	USC 13–7
3	7:29	USC	Damian Williams 41-yard pass from Matt Barkley (Jordan Congdon kick)	USC 20–7
3	5:18	ND	Golden Tate 45-yard pass from Jimmy Clausen (Nick Tausch kick)	USC 20–14
3	2:35	USC	Allen Bradford 3-yard run (Jordan Congdon kick)	USC 27–14
4	13:33	USC	Joe McKnight 1-yard run (Jordan Congdon kick)	USC 34–14
4	11:13	ND	Jimmy Clausen 2-yard run (kick blocked)	USC 34–20
4	7:28	ND	Golden Tate 15-yard pass from Jimmy Clausen (Nick Tausch kick)	USC 34–27

No. 6 USC led 13–7 at halftime and 27–14 after the third quarter. Joe McKnight's 1-yard touchdown run early in the fourth quarter made it 34–14. Notre Dame rallied with a 2-yard touchdown run by Jimmy Clausen and a 15-yard touchdown pass from Clausen to Golden Tate to close the gap to 34–27. Notre Dame reached the USC 4-yard line in the final seconds, but Clausen's last three passes were incomplete. With this win, USC extended its winning streak over Notre Dame to eight. Matt Barkley completed 19 of 29 passes for 380 yards and two touchdowns, and Anthony McCoy had five catches for 153 yards.

=== Oregon State ===
	1	2	3	4	Total
Beavers	6	3	14	13	36
#7 Trojans	7	14	14	7	42

USC scored first when quarterback Matt Barkley passed to Anthony McCoy for an 8-yard touchdown. The Beavers got on the scoreboard with two field goals from Justin Kahut (both 48 yards). In the second quarter, Barkley completed a 22-yard touchdown pass to Ronald Johnson. Barkley then rushed for a 1-yard touchdown for the Trojans. Kahut kicked a 33-yard field goal for Oregon State just before the half.

In the third quarter, Sean Canfield passed to Jacquizz Rodgers for a 6-yard touchdown for the Beavers on an eight-play, 61-yard drive. The Trojans countered with a 7-play drive for 70 yards with Allen Bradford rushing for 2 yards for a touchdown. Canfield narrowed Oregon State's gap by completing a 15-yard scoring pass to Damola Adeniji. USC answered with Allen Bradford scoring a 43-yard touchdown.

Early in the fourth quarter, Damian Williams returned a punt 63 yards for a touchdown to put USC ahead 42–23. Oregon State answered with a 7-yard touchdown catch by James Rodgers and a 1-yard run by Jacquizz Rodgers with 5:41 remaining to draw close, but USC then ran out the clock. The Beavers gained 482 total yards against the USC defense.

=== Oregon ===
	1	2	3	4	Total
#5 Trojans	3	14	3	0	20
#10 Ducks	10	14	17	6	47

Prior to the game, USC had lost three in a row in the state of Oregon, but had won four of the last five against the Ducks. The Trojans lost the game 47–20, which was the worst defeat suffered by USC since 1997.

1st Quarter

- 8:32 USC Jordan Congdon 28-yard field goal 3–0 USC
- 7:30 Oregon Morgan Flint 32-yard field goal 3–3 Tied
- 1:37 Oregon Jeremiah Masoli 3-yard run for Touchdown (Morgan Flint kick) 10–3 Oregon

2nd Quarter

- 10:55 USC Matt Barkley 3-yard pass to Ronald Johnson for Touchdown (Jordan Congdon kick) 10–10 Tied
- 8:39 Oregon Andre Crenshaw 1-yard run for Touchdown (Morgan Flint kick) 17–10 Oregon
- 3:17 USC Matt Barkley 4-yard pass to Damian Williams for Touchdown (Jordan Congdon kick) 17–17 Tied
- 1:49 Oregon Jeremiah Masoli 17-yard pass to Jamere Holland for Touchdown (Morgan Flint kick) 24–17 Oregon

3rd Quarter

- 11:58 Oregon Morgan Flint 35-yard field goal 27–17 Oregon
- 8:26 USC Jordan Congdon 39-yard field goal 27–20 Oregon
- 5:50 Oregon LaMichael James 5-yard run for Touchdown (Morgan Flint kick) 34–20 Oregon
- 0:00 Oregon Kenjon Barner 3-yard run for Touchdown (Morgan Flint kick) 41–20 Oregon

4th Quarter

- 8:00 Oregon Morgan Flint 22-yard field goal 44–20 Oregon
- 2:05 Oregon Morgan Flint 23-yard field goal 47–20 Oregon

=== Arizona State ===
	1	2	3	4	Total
#12 Trojans	0	7	7	0	14
Sun Devils	0	3	6	0	9

Will Harris returned an interception 55 yards for a touchdown in the second quarter, and Matt Barkley threw a 75-yard touchdown pass to Damian Williams early in the third quarter to put USC ahead 14–3. Arizona State's only touchdown came late in the third quarter through a 23-yard pass from Brock Osweiler to Chris McGaha. USC forced four turnovers, and Harris intercepted Osweiler's pass into the end zone as time expired. This win was USC's 10th straight win over Arizona State.

=== Stanford ===
	1	2	3	4	Total
#25 Cardinal	14	7	7	27	55
#11 Trojans	0	7	14	0	21

Toby Gerhart rushed for 178 yards and three touchdowns, and Stanford scored four touchdowns in the fourth quarter after leading 28–21.

Stanford's 55–21 victory was the highest number of points any team had scored against a USC Trojans football team in the 121-year history of Trojan football. The 34-point loss was the worst defeat USC had suffered since 1966. This was Stanford's third victory against USC in their last five games against each other at the Coliseum (Stanford winning 2001, 2007, and 2009, with USC winning in 2003 and 2005), with USC having defeated every non-Stanford opponent in the Coliseum since 2001, going 47–2 since Stanford's September 29, 2001 victory in the Coliseum. It was the first defeat in a November game for the Trojans under coach Pete Carroll's nine-season tenure. For the first time since Carroll's first season, USC lost more than two games in one season. For the second time in three weekends, Carroll suffered the worst loss of his USC tenure (the other being the Oregon game). This was the largest margin of victory for Stanford in a Stanford-USC game since the two teams' rivalry began in 1905. The win gave Harbaugh a 2–1 record against Carroll in the three times the two coaches had faced each other. Two years earlier, in the 2007 Stanford vs. Southern California football game, Stanford had won at the Coliseum as a 41-point underdog; this time, USC was an 11-point favorite.

=== UCLA ===
	1	2	3	4	Total
Bruins	0	0	0	7	7
#24 Trojans	7	0	7	14	28

USC retained the Victory Bell in the UCLA–USC rivalry game by defeating the Bruins 28–7. Both teams wore home jerseys, in a tradition that was restarted the previous year, with the Bruins wearing their 1967 throwback powder blue jerseys. Malcolm Smith returned an interception 62 yards for a touchdown in the first quarter, and Allen Bradford scored twice, the second time with 1:30 remaining in the fourth quarter to make it 21–7. After UCLA turned the ball over on downs with 54 seconds left, the USC quarterback took a knee. UCLA coach Rick Neuheisel then called a timeout to stop the clock. On the next play, Matt Barkley threw a 48-yard touchdown pass to Damian Williams for USC's fourth touchdown of the game. USC's celebration drew UCLA players across midfield, and coaches and officials kept the teams apart. The win was USC's 10th in 11 meetings with UCLA.

=== Arizona ===
	1	2	3	4	Total
Wildcats	7	7	0	7	21
#20 Trojans	0	7	7	3	17

Arizona led 14–7 at halftime with a 4-yard touchdown pass from Nick Foles to Delashaun Dean and a 1-yard run from Foles. USC scored with a 16-yard touchdown pass from Barkley to Ronald Johnson in between. Allen Bradford's 5-yard run tied the game 14–14 late in the third quarter. Jordan Congdon's 37-yard field goal with 7:13 remaining put USC ahead 17–14. Foles then threw a 36-yard touchdown pass to Juron Criner with 3:14 remaining to give Arizona a 21–17 win.

Arizona's defeat of the Trojans gave the Wildcats their first win over USC during the Pete Carroll era. Arizona was also the first non-Stanford team in the Pac-10 to defeat the Trojans in the Coliseum under Carroll (Stanford had defeated Carroll's teams in the Coliseum in 2001, 2007, and 2009). Arizona State was the only Pac-10 team to never beat the Trojans during Carroll's tenure.

After the loss, USC dropped out of the AP poll for the first time in eight years.

=== Boston College ===
	1	2	3	4	Total
Eagles	0	13	0	0	13
Trojans	7	7	3	7	24

This was USC's first appearance in the Emerald Bowl and its first non-BCS bowl after seven straight BCS games. On December 26, 2009, at AT&T Park in San Francisco, California, the Trojans faced the Boston College Eagles from the Atlantic Coast Conference before a crowd of 40,121.

Boston College was making its 11th straight bowl appearance. The Eagles became the first team to play in the Emerald Bowl twice, having beaten Colorado State 35–21 in the 2003 San Francisco Bowl (the former name of the Emerald Bowl). It was the third meeting between the two schools and the first in a bowl game. USC had won both games in the series, a 23–17 victory in Los Angeles in 1987 and a 34–7 win in Chestnut Hill in 1988.

Matt Barkley threw touchdown passes to Stanley Havili on the Trojans' first two possessions and added a touchdown run in the fourth quarter. Barkley finished the game with a total of 350 passing yards. Damian Williams caught 12 passes for 189 yards. Williams was named the game's offensive MVP for his efforts, and Boston College linebacker Luke Kuechly was named defensive MVP after making 16 tackles. Boston College was led by tailback Montel Harris, who rushed for 102 yards and also had a touchdown run.

== Rankings ==
Ranking movements Legend: ██ Increase in ranking ██ Decrease in ranking RV = Received votes ( ) = First-place votes
	Week															
Poll	Pre	1	2	3	4	5	6	7	8	9	10	11	12	13	14	Final
AP	4	3	3 (1)	12	7	7	6	4	4	12	11	22	24	20	RV	22
Coaches	4 (1)	3 (1)	3 (3)	10	7	7	5	4	4	13	10	21	22	19	RV	20
Harris	Not released				7	7	6	4	4	12	10	20	22	19	RV	Not released
BCS	Not released							7	5	12	9	18	20	18	24	Not released

== After the season ==
On January 10, 2010, it was reported that coach Carroll would resign his position with the Trojans to become the new head coach of the Seattle Seahawks. USC players and coaches learned of the news by text message from an assistant coach. Lane Kiffin, who had been USC's offensive coordinator before serving as head coach for the Oakland Raiders and the Tennessee Volunteers, was named the Trojans' new head coach on January 12, 2010.
