= Pete Carroll =

American football coach and executive (born 1951)

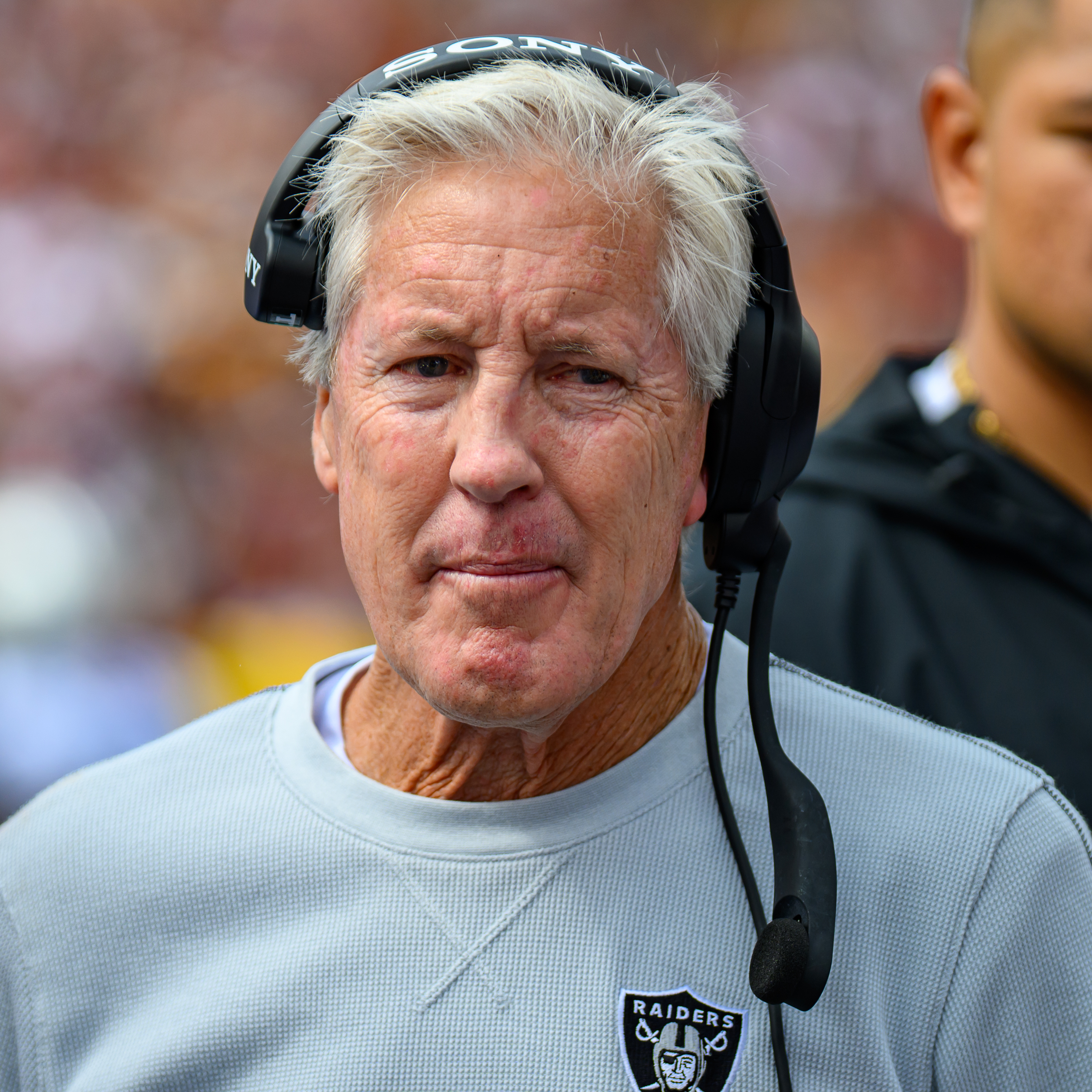
- Carroll with the Las Vegas Raiders in 2025

Profile
- Position: Head coach

Personal information
- Born: September 15, 1951 (age 75); San Francisco, California, U.S.

Career information
- High school: Redwood (Larkspur, California)
- College: Marin (1969–1970); Pacific (CA) (1971–1972)

Career history

Coaching
- Pacific (CA) (1973–1976) Graduate assistant; Arkansas (1977) Graduate assistant; Iowa State (1978) Secondary coordinator; Ohio State (1979) Secondary coordinator; NC State (1980–1982) Defensive coordinator; Pacific (CA) (1983) Offensive coordinator; Buffalo Bills (1984) Defensive backs coach; Minnesota Vikings (1985–1989) Defensive backs coach; New York Jets (1990–1993) Defensive coordinator; New York Jets (1994) Head coach; San Francisco 49ers (1995–1996) Defensive coordinator; New England Patriots (1997–1999) Head coach; USC (2001–2009) Head coach; Seattle Seahawks (2010–2023) Head coach; Las Vegas Raiders (2025) Head coach

Operations
- Seattle Seahawks (2010–2023) Vice president of football operations; Seattle Seahawks (2024) Senior advisor

Awards and highlights
- Super Bowl champion (XLVIII); 2× national champion (2003 (Note: In 2003, the AP poll declared USC the national champion, but the BCS system did not select the team to play in that season’s national championship game. USC nevertheless officially claims a national championship for 2003.), 2004 (Note: As a result of the 2011 NCAA sanctions imposed on USC because of the ineligibility of Reggie Bush, the Trojans' 2004 BCS national championship was vacated. However, USC maintains its AP national championship from that season.)); 7× Pac-10 champion (2002–2008) (Note: As a result of the 2011 NCAA sanctions imposed on USC because of the ineligibility of Reggie Bush, the Trojans' 2003 and 2004 Pac-10 conference titles were vacated.); NFL 2010s All-Decade Team; Home Depot Coach of the Year Award (2003); AFCA Coach of the Year Award (2003); George Munger Award (2003)

Head coaching record
- Regular season: NFL: 173–134–1 (.563); NCAA: 90–17 (.841)
- Postseason: NFL: 11–11 (.500); NCAA: 7–2 (.778)
- Career: NFL: 184–145–1 (.559); NCAA: 97–19 (.836)
- Coaching profile at Pro Football Reference
- Executive profile at Pro Football Reference

Peter Clay Carroll (born September 15, 1951) is an American football coach. He served as a head coach in the National Football League (NFL) for 19 seasons, primarily with the Seattle Seahawks, and as the head coach of the USC Trojans for nine seasons. Carroll is the third head coach to win both a college football national championship and a Super Bowl, achieving the former with the Trojans and the latter with the Seahawks.

Beginning his coaching career on the NFL level, Carroll saw minimal success as head coach of the New York Jets in 1994 and the New England Patriots from 1997 to 1999. Shifting to college football with USC, he revitalized the struggling program into a top-ranked contender from 2001 to 2009, winning seven consecutive conference championships and an AP national championship. He also won a BCS national championship at the 2005 Orange Bowl, although the title was later vacated.

Carroll's college success prompted a return to the NFL in 2010 when he was hired as the head coach of the Seahawks. During his 14 seasons, he led the team to 10 playoff appearances, five division titles, two consecutive Super Bowls, and the franchise's first championship in Super Bowl XLVIII. The team's Legion of Boom defense also led the league in scoring defense for four consecutive seasons under Carroll. Following the 2023 season, Carroll stepped down as head coach to take an advisory position with the Seahawks. He left Seattle in 2025 to become head coach of the Las Vegas Raiders, where he spent one season before he was fired.

== Early life ==
Carroll was born on September 15, 1951, in San Francisco, California, the son of Rita (née Ban) and James Edward "Jim" Carroll. Two of his paternal great-grandparents were Irish immigrants, and his Croatian maternal grandparents from Dubrovnik. He was raised in Greenbrae, California, and attended Greenbrae School. Carroll attended Redwood High School in Larkspur, California.

He was a multi-sport star in football (playing quarterback, wide receiver, and defensive back), basketball, and baseball, earning the school's Athlete of the Year honors as a senior in 1969. He was inducted into the charter class of the Redwood High School Athletic Hall of Fame in April 2009.

After high school, Carroll attended junior college at the nearby College of Marin, where he played football for two years, intercepting 12 passes, before transferring to the University of the Pacific, where he is a member of the California Rho (Calif. P) chapter of Sigma Alpha Epsilon fraternity. At Pacific, Carroll played free safety for two years for the Tigers, earning All-Pacific Coast Athletic Association honors both years (1971–72) and earning his Bachelor of Science in Business Administration in 1973. Following his senior season, Carroll was selected as Pacific's recipient of the Charles Erb Jr. Award for Most Inspirational Player, the Tully Knoles Award for Ironman, and the Sid Robinson Award for the team's Most Loyal Player.

Combined between Marin and UOP, Carroll finished his college career with 22 interceptions while also returning punts. After graduation, Carroll tried out for the Honolulu Hawaiians of the World Football League at their training camp in Riverside but did not make the team due to shoulder problems combined with his small size.

NCAA Statistics
Season	Team	INT	Ret. Yds.	TD	PR	Ret. Yds.	PR Avg.	LG	TD
1971	UOP	8	131	0	0	0	-	-	0
1972	UOP	2	34	0	24	281	11.7	42	0
Totals		10	165	0	24	281	11.7	42	0

== Coaching career ==
=== Collegiate assistant (1973–1983) ===
Carroll's energetic and positive personality made a good impression on his head coach, Chester Caddas. When Caddas found out Carroll was interested in coaching, he offered him a job as a graduate assistant on his staff at Pacific. Carroll agreed and enrolled as a graduate student, earning a secondary teaching credential and Master's degree in physical education in 1976, while serving as a graduate assistant for three years and working with the wide receivers and secondary defenders. The assistants at Pacific during this time included a number of other future successful coaches, including Greg Robinson, Jim Colletto, Walt Harris, Ted Leland, and Bob Cope. Carroll was inducted into the Pacific Athletic Hall of Fame in 1995.

After graduating from Pacific, Carroll's colleague Bob Cope was hired by the University of Arkansas and he convinced Lou Holtz, then the head coach of the Razorbacks, to also hire Carroll. Carroll spent the 1977 season as a graduate assistant working with the secondary under Cope. During his season with Arkansas, he met his future offensive line coach Pat Ruel, also a graduate assistant, as well as the future head coach of the Razorbacks Houston Nutt, who was a backup quarterback. Arkansas' Defensive Coordinator at the time, Monte Kiffin, became a mentor to Carroll. The Razorbacks won the 1978 Orange Bowl that season.

The following season, Carroll moved to Iowa State University, where he was again an assistant working on the secondary under Earle Bruce. When Bruce moved on to Ohio State University, he again hired Carroll to coach the secondary. The Ohio State squad made it to the 1980 Rose Bowl where they lost to USC.

When Monte Kiffin was named head coach of North Carolina State University in 1980, he brought Carroll in as his defensive coordinator and secondary coach. In 1983, Bob Cope became head coach of Pacific and brought Carroll on as assistant head coach and offensive coordinator.

=== National Football League (1984–1999) ===
Carroll left Pacific after a year and entered the NFL in 1984 as the defensive backs coach of the Buffalo Bills. The next year, he moved on to work with the Minnesota Vikings, where he held the same position from 1985–1989. In 1989, he was a candidate for the head coaching position at Stanford University; the position went to Dennis Green. His success with the Vikings led to his hiring by the New York Jets, where he served as defensive coordinator under Bruce Coslet from 1990–1993. Carroll and Coslet had known each other for many years by that time, as Carroll's older brother was Coslet's college roommate. When there was an opening for the Vikings' head coach position in 1992, he was a serious candidate but lost the position, again to Green.

In 1994, Carroll was elevated to head coach of the Jets. Known for his energy and youthful enthusiasm, Carroll painted a basketball court in the parking lot of the team's practice facility where he and his assistant coaches regularly played three-on-three games during their spare time. The Jets got off to a 6–5 start under Carroll, but in Week 12, he was the victim of Dan Marino's "clock play"—a fake spike that became a Miami Dolphins game-winning touchdown. The Jets lost all of their remaining games to finish 6–10. He was fired after one season.

Carroll was hired for the next season by the San Francisco 49ers, where he served as defensive coordinator for the following two seasons (1995–96). His return to success as the defensive coordinator led to his hiring as the head coach of the New England Patriots in 1997, replacing coach Bill Parcells, who had resigned after disputes with the team's ownership. His 1997 Patriots team won the AFC East division title, but his subsequent two teams did not fare as well—losing in the wild card playoff round in 1998, and missing the playoffs after a late-season slide in 1999—and he was fired after the 1999 season. Patriots owner Robert Kraft said firing Carroll was one of the toughest decisions he has had to make since buying the team, stating, "A lot of things were going on that made it difficult for him to stay, some of which were out of his control. And it began with following a legend." His combined NFL record as a head coach was 33–31, and he was later considered a much better fit for college football than the NFL after his success at USC.

Even though several NFL teams approached him with defensive coordinator positions, Carroll instead spent the 2000 season as a consultant for pro and college teams, doing charitable work for the NFL, and writing a column about pro football for CNNSI.com.

=== USC (2000–2009) ===
==== Hiring ====
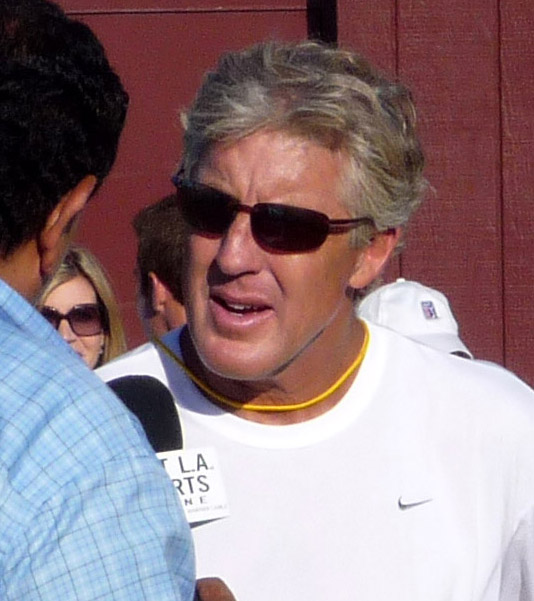
Carroll giving an interview after a fall practice in 2008

Carroll was named the Trojans' head coach on December 15, 2000, signing a five-year contract after USC had gone through a tumultuous 18-day search to replace fired coach Paul Hackett. He was not the Trojans' first choice, and was considered a long shot as the USC Athletic Department under Director Mike Garrett initially planned to hire a high-profile coach with recent college experience. Meanwhile, Carroll, who had not coached in over a year and not coached in the college ranks since 1983, drew unfavorable comparisons to the outgoing Hackett.

USC first pursued then-Oregon State coach Dennis Erickson, who instead signed a contract extension with the Beavers; then Oregon coach Mike Bellotti, who similarly signed an extension. The search then moved to the San Diego Chargers coach Mike Riley, who had been an assistant coach at USC before later becoming the head coach of Oregon State. Stuck in contractual obligations to the Chargers (who were still in the midst of an NFL season) and hesitant about moving his family, Riley was unable to give a firm answer, opening an opportunity for Carroll, the school's fourth choice.

Carroll actively pursued the position, as his daughter, Jaime, was then a player on the school's successful volleyball team. After the first three primary candidates turned down the position, USC hired Carroll. Under Garrett, USC had tried to recruit Carroll to be their head coach in 1997, while he was coaching the Patriots, but Carroll was unable to take the position. The second time the opening came up, Daryl Gross, then senior associate athletic director for USC, recommended Carroll to Garrett based on his experience as a former scout for the New York Jets while Carroll coached there. Garrett cited Carroll's intelligence, energy and reputation as a defensive specialist as reasons for his hire.

The choice of Carroll for USC's head coaching position was openly criticized by the media and many USC fans, primarily because of USC's stagnation under the outgoing Hackett and Carroll's record as a head coach in the NFL and being nearly two decades removed from the college level. Garrett took particular criticism for the hire, with the press tying his future with Carroll's after he had to fire two head coaches in four years for USC's premier athletic coaching position. Former NFL players (including USC alumni) such as Ronnie Lott, Gary Plummer, Tim McDonald and Willie McGinest offered their support for Carroll, who they noted had a player-friendly, easygoing style that might suit the college game and particularly recruiting. The USC Athletic Department received 2,500 e-mails, faxes and phone calls from alumni—mostly critical—and a number of donors asking for Carroll's removal before they would donate again.

Within a year of his hiring, many prominent critics reversed course. In 2008, ESPN.com named Carroll's hiring number 1 in a list of the Pac-10's top ten moments of the BCS era.

==== Tenure ====
The criticism of Carroll became louder when Carroll's first USC team opened the 2001 season going 2–5, with some sportswriters writing off the once-dominant Trojans, who were the only Pac-10 football team to never finish in the national top 10 during the previous decade, as a dying program. After the slow start, Carroll's teams went 67–7 over the next 74 games, winning two national championships and playing for another.

Carroll was considered one of the most effective recruiters in college football, having brought in multiple top-ranked recruiting classes; he was also known for getting commitments from nationally prominent players early in high school. His son, Brennan Carroll, was USC's recruiting coordinator as well as the tight ends coach during the elder Carroll's tenure as head coach. He had consistently been on the forefront of recruiting due to his ability to connect with potential players on their level, including becoming the first college coach with a Facebook page, as well as an early adopter of Twitter.

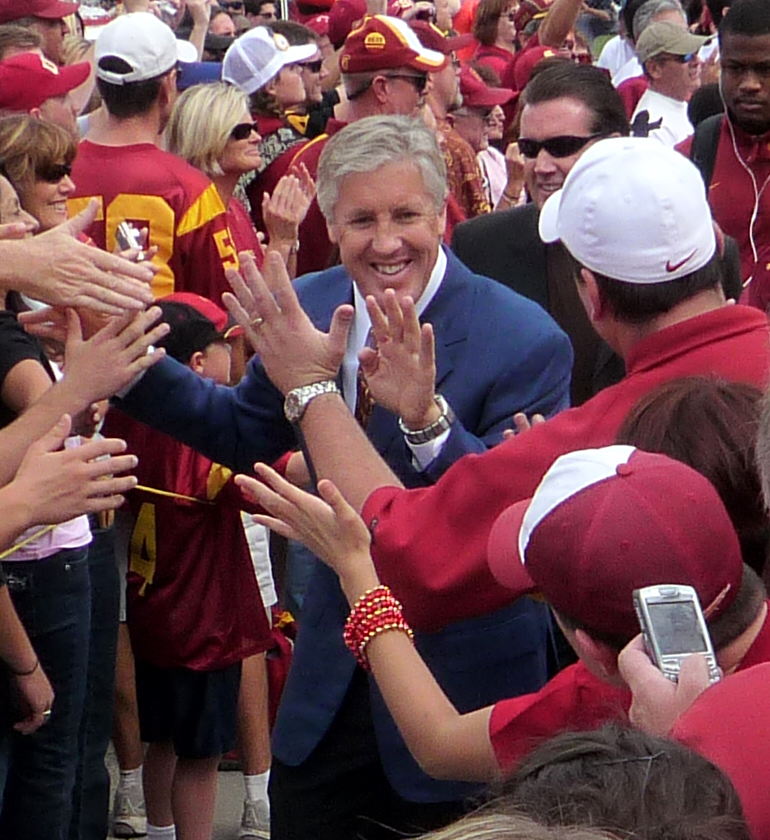
Carroll leads his team through the "Trojan Walk", a tradition he started at USC in 2001.

Carroll's team won a then-school record 34 straight games from 2003 to 2005, a streak that started after a triple-overtime loss to California and ended with the national championship game against the Texas Longhorns in the 2006 Rose Bowl. Fourteen of those games were later vacated for breaking NCAA rules. During his tenure, USC broke its average home attendance record four times in a row (they play at the Los Angeles Memorial Coliseum); the USC home attendance average in 2001, his first season, was 57,744; by 2006, it was over 91,000. During this period, USC had a 35-game winning streak at the Coliseum, spanning 6 years (2001–2007). The streak began on October 13, 2001, with a 48–17 win over the Arizona State Sun Devils and the final victory was a 47–14 win over the Washington State Cougars on September 22, 2007. The streak ended on October 6, 2007, with a 24–23 loss to the Stanford Cardinal who was a 41-point underdog. Prior to this the last loss was on September 29, 2001, (during Carroll's first year) to Stanford Cardinal 21–16. The success of USC football under Carroll led to a sharp rise in overall athletic department revenue, growing from $38.6 million in Carroll's first season at USC to more than $76 million in 2007–08.

Controversy arose when USC was excluded from the National Championship Game for the 2003 season, even though ranked #1 in both the Associated Press (AP) Poll and the ESPN/USA Today Coaches Poll. Years later, (2008) he was asked if winning the Rose Bowl was ever not enough. "No. You've got to understand that our mindset is to focus only on what we can control. We can only control getting to the Rose Bowl. Winning our conference and going to the Rose Bowl is what our goal is every year. Our goal isn't about national championships, because we don't have control of that – that's in somebody else's hands. We found that out years ago [2003], when we were No. 1 but then we were No. 3. We already knew that but that just proved it. If we win our games and we're out there and they want us to go somewhere else, then we'll go. We love the Rose Bowl."

Carroll was repeatedly approached regarding vacant head coach positions in the NFL beginning in 2002. Carroll hesitated to return to the NFL after his previous experiences, and said that his return would likely rest on control over personnel matters at a level unprecedented in the league. He had insisted over the years that he was happy at USC and that money was not an issue; he also was said to enjoy the Southern California lifestyle. When asked if he would retire at USC, Carroll responded:

I am prepared to do that. That's the way I look at it, like this is the last job I'm ever going to have. I approach it that way. Now, whether it is or not, I don't know. Someone asked me the other day, 'Does that mean you're never going to leave?' Why do people want to make you say that? I have no idea, but I can't imagine doing anything else. It's a great place to be. I've been so lucky and fortunate. I owe so much to the school and the people who follow it. And the guys who played for us. I love being here.

When originally hired, Carroll signed a five-year contract worth approximately $1 million annually. He received a significant raise after the 2002 season and earned close to $3 million in the 2004 season, which ended with USC winning the BCS title in January 2005. He agreed to a contract extension in December 2005. His total compensation, including pay and benefits, for the 2007 fiscal year was $4,415,714.

On January 11, 2010, it was reported that Carroll would be leaving USC to coach the Seattle Seahawks. Carroll had told his players the previous evening that he would be resigning his position with the Trojans to become the new head coach of the Seahawks. According to the Los Angeles Times, Carroll came to agreement with the Seahawks on a 5-year, $33 million contract to become head coach.

==== Accomplishments ====
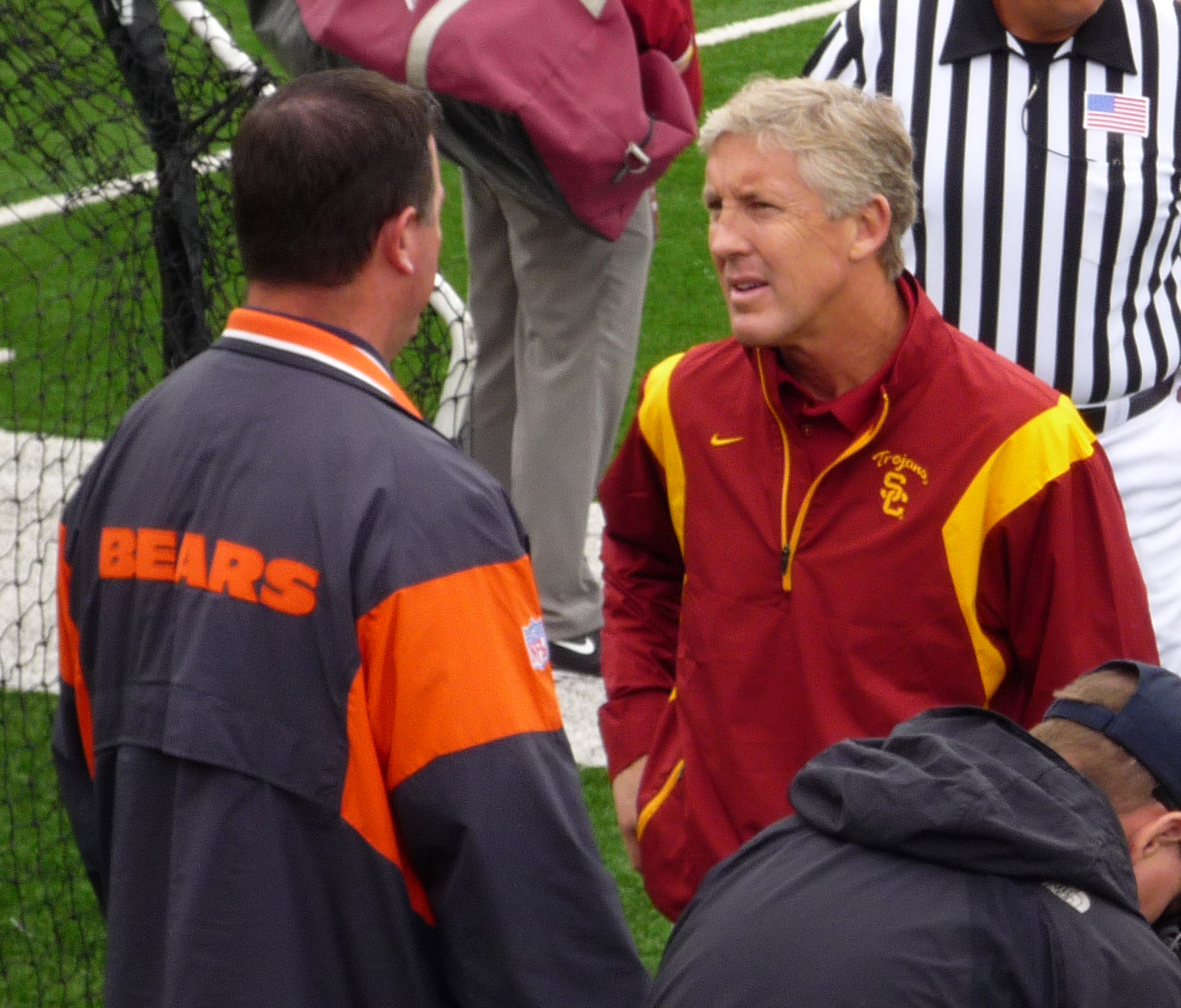
Pete Carroll talking to a pro scout before a game; during his tenure, 53 USC players were drafted by the NFL.

As head coach, Pete Carroll led a resurgence of football at the University of Southern California. Carroll was generally regarded as one of the top college football coaches in the country, and has been compared to College Football Hall of Fame coach Knute Rockne. Program highlights under Carroll include:

- Two BCS Championship Game appearances: 2005 win over Oklahoma and 2006 loss to Texas
- The Associated Press 2003 National Championship
- The Associated Press 2004 National Championship
- Seven consecutive Associated Press Top-4 finishes
- Six BCS bowl victories
- Seven consecutive BCS bowl appearances
- A national-record 33 consecutive weeks as the Associated Press's No. 1-ranked team
- A winning record of 97–19 (83.6%)
- A winning record of 14–2 against traditional rivals Notre Dame and UCLA
- An NCAA record of 63 straight 20-point games
- Twenty-five 1st team All-Americans
- 53 players selected in the NFL draft, including 14 in the first round
- Three Heisman Trophy winners: Carson Palmer in 2002, Matt Leinart in 2004, and Reggie Bush in 2005
- Four Top-5 recruiting classes
- 34-game winning streak (2003–04)
- Winning streaks for home games (21) and Pac-10 home games (17)
- A 25–1 record in the month of November

In July 2007, ESPN.com named USC its #1 team of the decade for the period between 1996 and 2006, primarily citing the Trojans' renaissance and dominance under Carroll. In 2007, his effect on the college football landscape was named one of the biggest developments over the past decade in ESPN the Magazine. In May 2008, Carroll was named the coach who did the most to define the first 10 years of the BCS Era.

In July 2014, Carroll was announced as a member of the 2015 USC Athletic Hall of Fame class.

==== NCAA sanctions and ruling ====
On June 9, 2010, The Los Angeles Times reported that Carroll, along with other active and former USC officials, had appeared in front of a ten-member NCAA Committee on Infractions the previous February. The next day, June 10, the NCAA announced sanctions against the USC football program including a two-year bowl ban, the elimination of thirty football scholarships, and forfeiture of some football victories from 2004 to 2005 (a season which had included winning the Bowl Championship Series title), and all team victories from the undefeated 2005–06 regular season, when USC lost to Texas in the BCS title game. With the vacated games removed, Carroll drops to fourth on USC's all-time wins list, behind John McKay, Howard Jones and John Robinson. His 97 on-field wins would put him ahead of Robinson for third in Trojan history.

The allegations centered on former Trojan star Reggie Bush. Bush was found to have accepted several improper gifts, including the use of a San Diego area home for members of his family. It was reported that USC might appeal the sanctions. These sanctions have been criticized by some NCAA football writers, including ESPN's Ted Miller, who wrote, "It's become an accepted fact among informed college football observers that the NCAA sanctions against USC were a travesty of justice, and the NCAA's refusal to revisit that travesty are [sic] a massive act of cowardice on the part of the organization."

After Carroll announced that he was leaving for the Seahawks, he denied the possibility that the NCAA sanctions were a factor in his leaving USC to return to pro football in Seattle. "Not in any way," Carroll stated, "because I know where we stand. It's just a process we have to go through. We know we've fought hard to do right." Carroll was hired before the sanctions were announced.

Reacting to the USC sanctions in a video produced by his new employers, Carroll said on June 10, 2010, "I'm absolutely shocked and disappointed in the findings of the NCAA." He said in 2014 during a visit to USC, "I thought [the NCAA's investigation into USC] was dealt with poorly and very irrationally and done with way too much emotion instead of facts. I sat in the meetings. I listened to the people talk. I listened to the venom that they had for our program... They tried to make it out like it was something else. They made a terrible error." In 2015, he said, "We had so much success and we had so much fun doing it, it was uncommon for people to understand. ... I think it rubbed people the wrong way. There was such a bitterness."

===== Reactions =====
Wrote Los Angeles Times sportswriter Jerry Crowe, "It's somehow apt that the Trojans were asked to return the Grantland Rice Trophy after being stripped of the 2004 Football Writers Assn. of America national championship... Grantland Rice was the legendary early 20th century sportswriter who wrote, 'When the great scorer comes/to mark against your name/He'll write not 'won' or 'lost'/but how you played the game.'"

Among Carroll's critics in the media was longtime Los Angeles Times sportswriter Bill Plaschke, who said that in one stroke, Carroll went

from a coach who presided over the greatest days in USC football history to one who was in charge of its biggest embarrassment. He goes from saint to scallywag. Carroll says he didn't know about the Bush violations. That now seems impossible... ...he made $33 million from violations that will cost his old school its reputation, and folks here will never look at him the same.

Sporting News writer Mike Florio called for the Seahawks to fire Carroll, saying that "justice won't truly be served until the only coaching Carroll ever does entails holding an Xbox controller."

On August 26, 2010, the Football Writers Association of America announced it would take back USC's 2004 Grantland Rice Trophy and leave that year's award vacant, the only vacancy in the over half century of the history of the award. The FWAA also said it would not consider USC as a candidate for the award for the 2010 season. New USC athletic director Pat Haden said USC would return the trophy, stating, "While we know that some fans and former student-athletes may be disappointed, our central priority at this time is our overall commitment to compliance and this action is in line with the standards we have set for our entire athletic program."

=== Seattle Seahawks (2010–2023) ===
After the Seattle Seahawks fired head coach Jim L. Mora after the 2009 season, Carroll was rumored to be in the running for the job. On January 8, 2010, it was reported that Carroll was about to be hired as head coach of the Seahawks; the two parties were hammering out "minor details" in the pending contract. According to the Los Angeles Times, Carroll was "close to reaching an agreement with the Seattle Seahawks on Friday evening." On the morning of January 9, 2010, Carroll reportedly came to agreement with the Seahawks on a five-year contract that would appoint him as head coach. He was officially hired as the Seahawks' head coach on January 11.

==== Beginnings and first playoff win: 2010–2011 ====
When initially named as Seahawks head coach, Carroll was also named executive vice president of football operations, effectively making him the Seahawks' general manager. While the Seahawks had a general manager in John Schneider, he served mainly in an advisory role to Carroll, who had the final say in football matters. Carroll and Schneider would be involved in every draft for the Seahawks, and Carroll was given veto power over Schneider's moves.

In his debut season, Carroll led a completely overhauled Seahawks roster of his liking, totaling over 200 transactions in the course of a single year. This included trading for running back Marshawn Lynch from the Buffalo Bills after three games. These moves paved the way for a 4–2 start to the 2010 season. Although Seattle faltered through the latter half of the season, the team beat their NFC West division rival St. Louis Rams in the final week of the regular season for the division championship, becoming the first 7–9 team in NFL history to win a division title. Carroll made even more history as the Seahawks later upset the reigning Super Bowl Champions New Orleans Saints by a score of 41–36 during the wild-card round of the playoffs, with Lynch executing the "Beast Quake" run. The following week at Soldier Field in Chicago, Illinois, they then fell to the Chicago Bears, whom they had defeated earlier in the season, in the Divisional Round by a score of 35–24.

In 2011, Carroll again coached the Seahawks to a 7–9 record, but it was not enough to secure a playoff spot due to the ascendance of Carroll's old college rival coach Jim Harbaugh and division rival San Francisco 49ers, who finished with a 13–3 record. It was the first season the Seahawks had a starting quarterback other than Matt Hasselbeck in over a decade.

==== Arrival of Russell Wilson and the Legion of Boom, Super Bowl victory and loss: 2012–2014 ====
In his third season with the Seahawks in 2012, Carroll, along with rookie quarterback Russell Wilson, led the team to an 11–5 record, including going undefeated at home. Additionally, the defense, led by the secondary of Richard Sherman, Kam Chancellor and Earl Thomas, began to solidify and garnered the nickname the "Legion of Boom". The 2012 season was Carroll's first winning season for the team. The Seahawks were also involved in controversy during Week 3's Monday Night Football game against the Green Bay Packers in Seattle, when the replacement officials called two different results for Russell Wilson's Hail Mary pass to wide receiver Golden Tate. The officials called the play in the Seahawks' favor, igniting a national outrage about the officiating. When the NFL referee lockout ended several days later, NFL Commissioner Roger Goodell acknowledged that public furor over the call accelerated the eventual resolution of the labor dispute. Carroll's record was enough to post the team's second playoff berth, and the Seahawks won their Wild Card Round game on the road against the Washington Redskins and fellow rookie quarterback Robert Griffin III, 24–14. Seattle lost the following week in the Divisional Round to the Atlanta Falcons at the Georgia Dome by a score of 30–28.

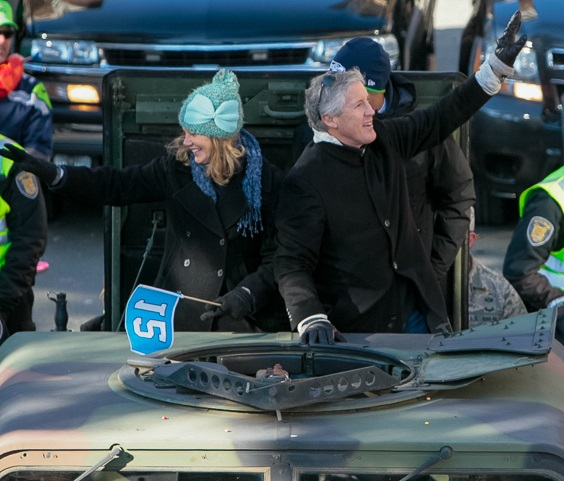
Pete Carroll in the Super Bowl champions parade in Seattle

The Seattle Seahawks 2013 season began with four consecutive preseason wins, and commentators had them as one of the key favorites in the NFC. The regular season began with a 12–7 victory against the Carolina Panthers. The prior year's NFC Champions and divisional rival, the San Francisco 49ers, were blown out by the Seahawks, 29–3. Winning out September, they visited the Indianapolis Colts in Indianapolis and suffered their first loss, on October 6. That was the only loss that the team suffered until December. Heading to San Francisco for their second match-up against their divisional foe, the Seahawks had the best record in the NFC at 11–1. The game was in stark contrast to their first in September, as the 49ers (9–4 at that point) edged out a 19–17 win, which dropped Seattle to 11–2. The penultimate game, against the Arizona Cardinals, was Seattle's attempt to continue their at-home winning streak to 15 games (record started in Week 2 of the 2012 season). Although the Seahawks had won their three prior meetings, including one earlier in the year, the Cardinals had steadily improved during the season. The at-home win streak did not reach 15. The Cardinals won, and Seattle suffered its third loss of the year. They bounced back against the St. Louis Rams in their finale to finish at 13–3 and finish a game above both San Francisco and Carolina, who each had twelve wins. The number one team (and playoff seed) in the NFC, Carroll matched Mike Holmgren's 2005 season of the same record, tying for the best in Seattle history. The Seahawks defeated the New Orleans Saints in the Divisional Round of the playoffs by a score of 23–15. In the NFC Championship Game, cornerback Richard Sherman tipped a Colin Kaepernick pass into the waiting arms of Malcolm Smith to secure a 23–17 win over the San Francisco 49ers. The moment has been referred to as both "The Tip" and the "Immaculate Deflection".

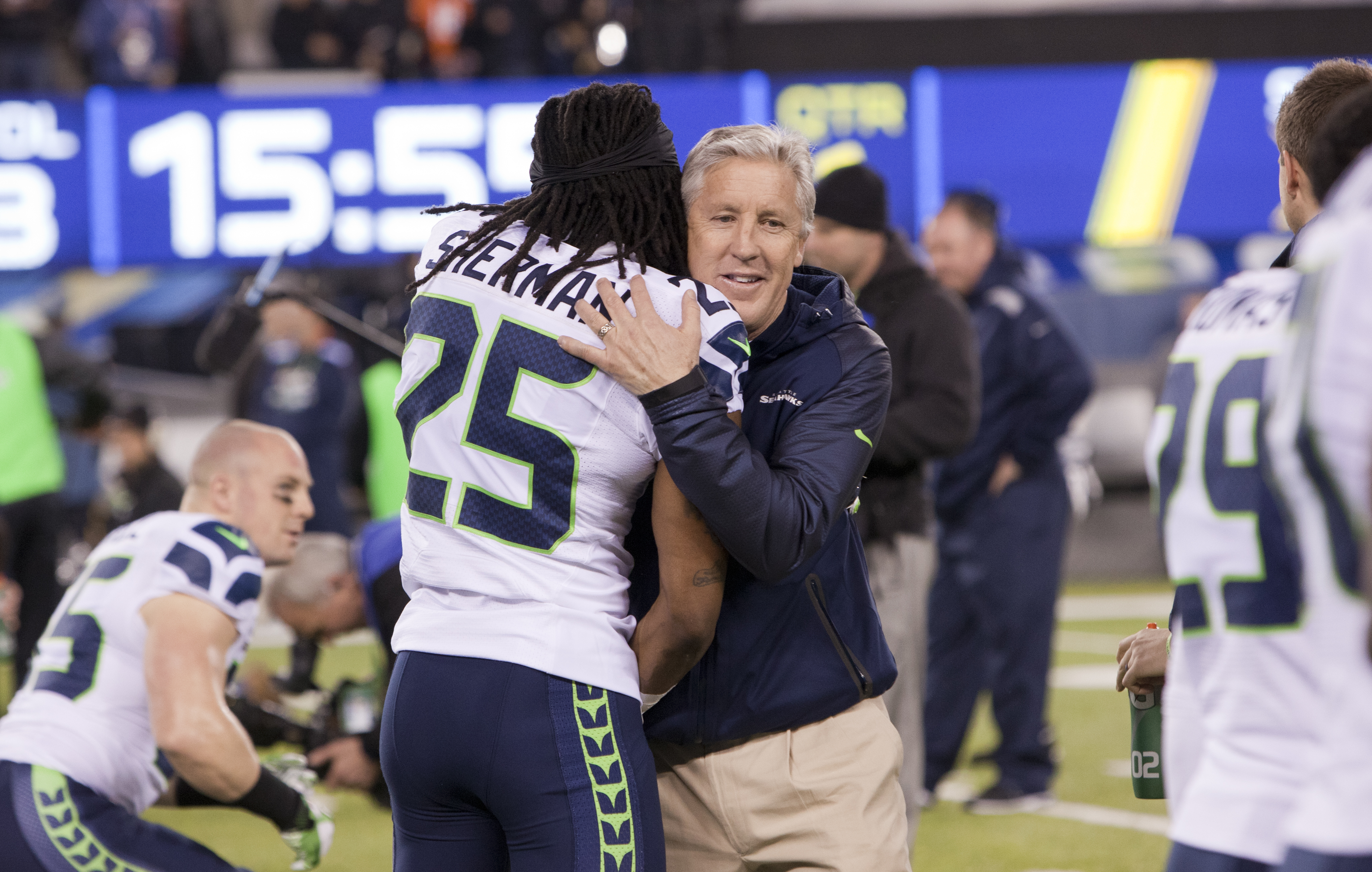
Pete Carroll embracing Richard Sherman at Super Bowl XLVIII

On February 2, 2014, Carroll led the Seattle Seahawks to their first Super Bowl win in franchise history after defeating the Denver Broncos, 43–8, in Super Bowl XLVIII. Carroll joined Barry Switzer and Jimmy Johnson as the only coaches to win both an NCAA championship and a Super Bowl. At age 62, Carroll was then the third-oldest coach to win a Super Bowl. Tom Coughlin was 65 when the New York Giants won Super Bowl XLVI and Dick Vermeil was 63 when the St. Louis Rams won Super Bowl XXXIV.

The following season in 2014, the Seahawks started off their quest to repeat as champions with a 36–16 defeat of the Green Bay Packers on Thursday Night Football in the first game of the NFL season. A Super Bowl XLVIII rematch came in Week 3, with Seattle again defeating Peyton Manning and the Denver Broncos, 26–20 in overtime. Losses to the San Diego Chargers, Dallas Cowboys, St. Louis Rams, and Kansas City Chiefs caused the Seahawks to start the season with a 6–4 record, three games behind the division leading Arizona Cardinals. After a team meeting following a Week 11 loss, the Seahawks finished the regular season 6–0 to finish with a 12–4 record. As the #1 seed in the playoffs, the Seahawks beat the Carolina Panthers in the Divisional Round, 31–17, to get to their second straight NFC Championship. After trailing 19–7 to the Green Bay Packers with just over two minutes remaining in the NFC Championship, the Seahawks launched a furious comeback to force overtime. On the first possession of overtime, Russell Wilson hit wide receiver Jermaine Kearse for a game-winning touchdown that sent the Seahawks to their second straight Super Bowl.

On February 1, 2015, Carroll's Seahawks lost Super Bowl XLIX to Carroll's former team, the New England Patriots, 28–24. With 25 seconds to go on second down and goal at the Patriots' 1-yard line, and the Seahawks trailing by four points, Carroll called for a pass play. Wilson's pass was intercepted by Patriots cornerback Malcolm Butler on the goal line, and the Patriots ran out the clock. Some have called Carroll's play-call on the play the worst in NFL history and the decision has otherwise remained broadly controversial. Carroll defended his decision in an interview in 2023 despite previously having taken accountability for the team's failure to win that game.

==== Additional playoff wins and end of the Legion of Boom: 2015–2017 ====
The Seahawks began the 2015 season by blowing fourth quarter leads to the St. Louis Rams, Green Bay Packers, Cincinnati Bengals, Carolina Panthers, and Arizona Cardinals. After losing at home on NBC Sunday Night Football to the division leading Cardinals, Seattle sat at 4–5. The Seahawks then won their next five games, putting them at 9–5 and clinching a playoff berth. Russell Wilson became the first quarterback to throw 19 or more touchdown passes without any interceptions over five or more wins. The Seahawks ended the regular season with a revengeful win against the Arizona Cardinals, beating the NFC West champions 36–6 on the road. Seattle entered the postseason as the #6 seed, winning its Wild Card Round against the Minnesota Vikings after Vikings kicker Blair Walsh missed a 27-yard field goal for a final score of 10–9. The Seahawks later fell to the Carolina Panthers in the Divisional Round 31–24, after being down 31–0 at the half, and as a result, the Seahawks did not reach a third consecutive Super Bowl.

On July 25, 2016, Carroll signed a three-year contract extension with the Seahawks that would keep him in Seattle through the 2019 season. Carroll's Seahawks once again had high expectations leading into the 2016 season, but injuries to key players on both sides of the ball eventually became too much to overcome. The Seahawks were able to start the season with a 4–1 record, despite Russell Wilson playing with a hurt ankle sustained in the season opener against the Miami Dolphins. In Week 10, the Seahawks travelled to New England to play the Patriots for the first time since the Super Bowl XLIX loss, and came away with a 31–24 victory to push the Seahawks to 6–2–1. Carroll notched his 100th regular-season win the following week against the Philadelphia Eagles. The Seahawks clinched the NFC West in Week 15, following a 24–3 victory over the Los Angeles Rams. It was Carroll's fourth NFC West division title in his seven seasons with the team, and sixth playoff appearance. In the Wild Card Round, the Seahawks dominated the Detroit Lions in a 26–6 victory. The victory extended Seattle's playoff home game win streak to 10 consecutive wins, 6 of which have come under Carroll. The Seahawks were eliminated in the Divisional Round for the second straight year in 2016, losing 36–20 to the Atlanta Falcons. In his season-ending press conference, Carroll revealed that cornerback Richard Sherman had been playing with a "significant" MCL injury, which attracted attention because Sherman had not been listed on the injury report throughout the season.

In 2017, his eighth season with the Seahawks, Carroll led the team to a 9–7 record. The team finished second in the NFC West but missed out on the playoffs for only the second time in Carroll's time with the Seahawks. Following the season, the Legion of Boom would disband with Sherman leaving the team and Chancellor retiring.

==== Post-Legion of Boom and return to the playoffs: 2018–2021 ====
In the 2018 season, Carroll helped lead the Seahawks to a 10–6 record and a second-place finish in the NFC West. The team returned to the playoffs, where they lost 24–22 to the Dallas Cowboys in the Wild Card Round. On October 14, 2018, Carroll reached win number 91 over the Oakland Raiders, becoming the Seahawks' all-time wins leader (including postseason), passing Mike Holmgren with a record of 91–56–1 at that point.

On September 15, 2019, which was his 68th birthday, Carroll won his 100th game as the Seahawks head coach, defeating the Pittsburgh Steelers 28–26. Carroll's Seahawks finished the season at 11–5, finishing second in the NFC West behind the 13–3 San Francisco 49ers. As a fifth seed in the playoffs, the Seahawks defeated the Philadelphia Eagles 17–9 in the Wild Card Round, before being eliminated in the Divisional Round by the Green Bay Packers 28–23. Carroll coached the NFC team in the 2020 Pro Bowl.

During the 2020 offseason, Carroll, along with New England Patriots head coach Bill Belichick were named as coaches for the NFL 2010s All-Decade Team.

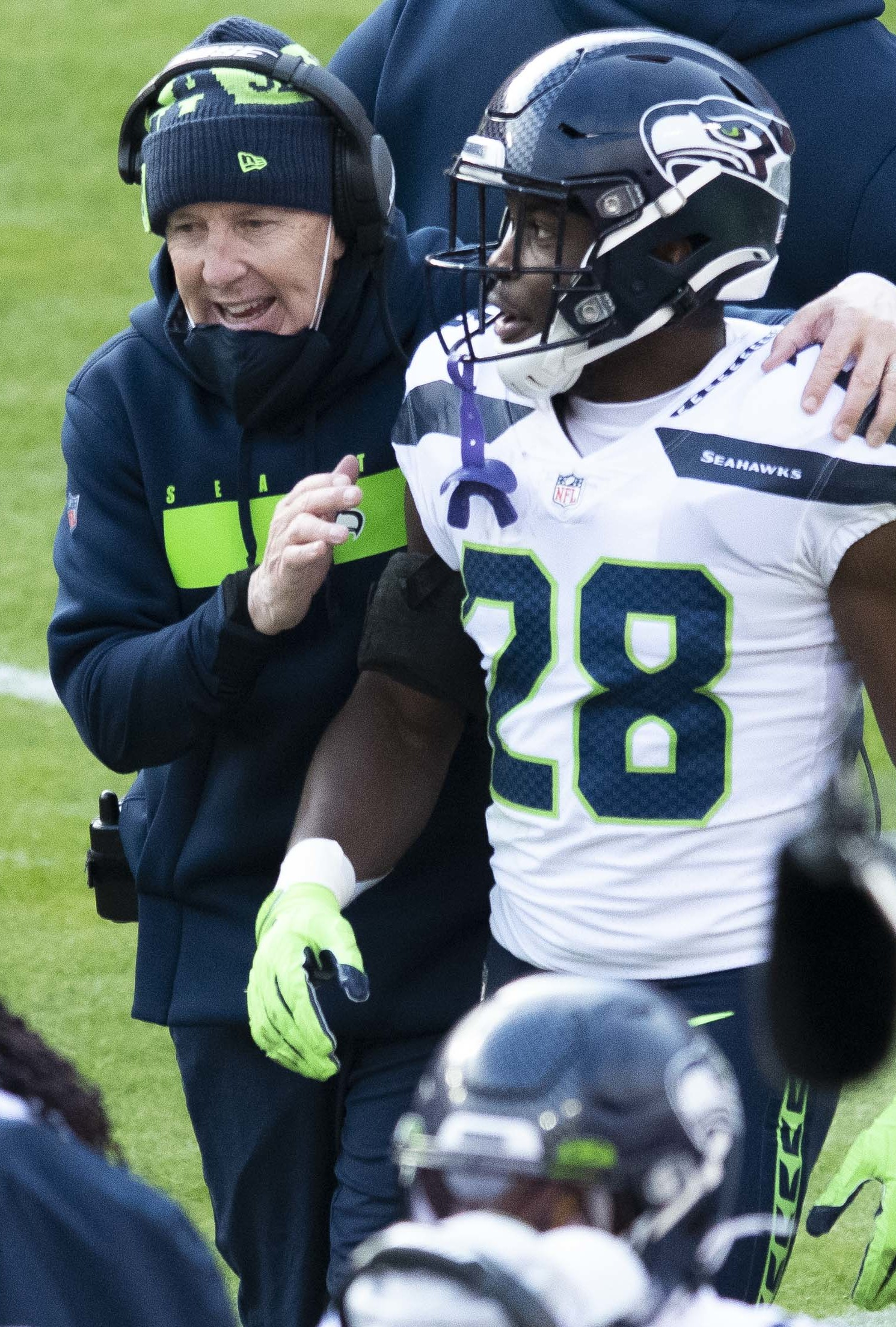
Pete Carroll with Ugo Amadi during a game in 2020

Carroll was fined US$100,000 by the NFL for not properly wearing a face mask, as required for coaches during the COVID-19 pandemic, during a Week 2 game in the 2020 NFL season on September 21, 2020. On November 8, 2020, Carroll and the Seahawks agreed to a four-year contract extension. They ended the season with a 12–4 record and won their first division title since 2016, but lost to the Los Angeles Rams in the Wild Card Round 30–20.

Carroll and the Seahawks named Rams passing game coordinator Shane Waldron to the offensive coordinator position in 2021. Under Waldron, Seattle's offense got off to a hot start, with quarterback Russell Wilson completing 18 of 23 passes for 254 yards and four touchdowns as the Seahawks won 28–16 to the Indianapolis Colts, finishing with a passer rating of 152.3. The following week against the Tennessee Titans, the Seahawks lost 33–30 in overtime, after blowing a 30–16 lead in the fourth quarter. In Week 3 against the Minnesota Vikings, the Seahawks raced to a 17–7 lead early in the second quarter before their offense was shut out by the Vikings for the rest of the game; Seattle lost 30–17. In Week 5 against the Los Angeles Rams on Thursday Night Football, quarterback Russell Wilson broke his finger on a sack by Rams defensive tackle Aaron Donald, and he was ruled out as backup Geno Smith relieved him in the 26–17 loss.

Wilson was placed on injured reserve later that same day, missing a start for the first time in his NFL career. Carroll and the Seahawks went 1–2 in Wilson's absence before hitting the bye week. Wilson was activated off injured reserve on November 12 ahead of their game against the Green Bay Packers. Wilson and the Seahawks were blanked in the 17–0 loss for the first time since he became their starting quarterback, completing just 20 of 40 passes for 161 yards and two interceptions.

Carroll's Seahawks rallied to finish the season by winning four of their final six games, with one loss coming by just one point. During the season, the Seahawks' first such losing season since 2011, Carroll candidly admitted to the media that he "probably wouldn't have been here a long time" without his longtime starting quarterback. Despite the disappointing season, it was reported on January 16, 2022, that Carroll and general manager John Schneider would retain their jobs for the next year.

==== Departure of Wilson and final years as head coach: 2022–2023 ====
In the offseason, Russell Wilson was traded to the Denver Broncos. Carroll later named Geno Smith the starter for the regular season opener, which would be against Wilson and the Broncos. In Week 1, the Seahawks defeated the Broncos 17–16 on Monday Night Football. Carroll led the Seahawks to a surprise 9–8 finish and an appearance in the playoffs. The Seahawks' season ended in the Wild Card Round with a 41–23 loss to the San Francisco 49ers.

In 2023, Carroll again led the Seahawks to a 9–8 record, but Seattle was eliminated from the playoffs on the last day of the season; the Green Bay Packers, who had an identical record but held the playoff tiebreaker over the Seahawks, won over the Chicago Bears in the final game.

On January 10, 2024, Carroll and the Seahawks mutually agreed that he would step down from his head coaching role. He ended his tenure as the Seahawks' winningest head coach, with a 137–89–1 record in the regular season, a 10–9 record in the postseason, as well as one Super Bowl win in back-to-back appearances. Baltimore Ravens defensive coordinator Mike Macdonald was named as his successor later that month; he stated that he wanted to maintain the team culture first built by Carroll. Macdonald was half of Carroll's age upon his hiring, resulting in the Seahawks going from having the oldest head coach in the league to the youngest.

After stepping down as head coach, Carroll remained with the Seattle Seahawks organization but was moved to an advisor role. Schneider would assume all football operations, which included having the final say in all football matters and having all coaching staff report to him. During the 2024 preseason, Carroll stated that he had little to do with the Seahawks, aside from watching a few of the preseason games on television, feeling it was the right thing to do to let them go. He also said that aside from a brief greeting in the parking lot, he had no contact with Macdonald, in order to let him build the team in his own vision. The two had a non-business encounter during the middle of the season at an NBA preseason game at Climate Pledge Arena. Macdonald attended the event with members of the Seahawks front office, and upon learning that Carroll was there as well, decided to greet his predecessor and exchange pleasantries.

=== Las Vegas Raiders (2025) ===
On January 25, 2025, Carroll was hired as the head coach of the Las Vegas Raiders, replacing Antonio Pierce and departing Seattle after 15 years with the Seahawks organization. On March 13, 2025, the Raiders traded for Geno Smith, reuniting Carroll with his former Seahawks quarterback. He retained incumbent defensive coordinator Patrick Graham and brought in Ohio State offensive coordinator and former Philadelphia Eagles head coach Chip Kelly as the new offensive coordinator. On February 3, it was reported that Carroll would hire his son, Brennan, as the team's new offensive line coach. On August 7, 2025, Carroll returned to Lumen Field to face his former team in the first game of the preseason against the Seahawks, giving him a chance to say goodbye to the fans and former players. The game ended in a 23–23 tie.

Upon coaching his first regular season game for the Raiders in a 20–13 victory over the New England Patriots, he became the oldest head coach in NFL history, having coached his second game with the team a week later on his 74th birthday. The Raiders ended the season with a 3–14 record, the worst in the league, ensuring that the team would receive the first overall selection in the 2026 NFL draft. The three wins marked for fewest for Carroll in a single season in his NFL coaching career. Carroll was fired by the Raiders on January 5, 2026, the day after the season ended.

=== Since 2026 ===
With no teams hiring, Carroll did not coach during the 2026 NFL season. He continued in his role as an adjunct professor for the USC Marshall School of Business, where he began teaching in 2025, and spoke to the school at its commencement ceremony. He was also named the head coach of Team Makai for the 2027 Polynesian Bowl.

== Head coaching record ==
=== NFL ===
Team	Year	Regular season					Postseason			
Team	Year	Won	Lost	Ties	Win %	Finish	Won	Lost	Win %	Result
NYJ	1994	6	10	0	.375	5th of AFC East	—	—	—	—
NYJ total		6	10	0	.375		0	0	.000	
NE	1997	10	6	0	.625	1st in AFC East	1	1	.500	Lost to Pittsburgh Steelers in AFC Divisional Game
NE	1998	9	7	0	.563	4th in AFC East	0	1	.000	Lost to Jacksonville Jaguars in AFC Wild Card Game
NE	1999	8	8	0	.500	4th in AFC East	—	—	—	—
NE total		27	21	0	.563		1	2	.333	
SEA	2010	7	9	0	.438	1st in NFC West	1	1	.500	Lost to Chicago Bears in NFC Divisional Game
SEA	2011	7	9	0	.438	3rd in NFC West	—	—	—	—
SEA	2012	11	5	0	.688	2nd in NFC West	1	1	.500	Lost to Atlanta Falcons in NFC Divisional Game
SEA	2013	13	3	0	.813	1st in NFC West	3	0	1.000	Super Bowl XLVIII champions
SEA	2014	12	4	0	.750	1st in NFC West	2	1	.667	Lost to New England Patriots in Super Bowl XLIX
SEA	2015	10	6	0	.625	2nd in NFC West	1	1	.500	Lost to Carolina Panthers in NFC Divisional Game
SEA	2016	10	5	1	.656	1st in NFC West	1	1	.500	Lost to Atlanta Falcons in NFC Divisional Game
SEA	2017	9	7	0	.563	2nd in NFC West	—	—	—	—
SEA	2018	10	6	0	.625	2nd in NFC West	0	1	.000	Lost to Dallas Cowboys in NFC Wild Card Game
SEA	2019	11	5	0	.688	2nd in NFC West	1	1	.500	Lost to Green Bay Packers in NFC Divisional Game
SEA	2020	12	4	0	.750	1st in NFC West	0	1	.000	Lost to Los Angeles Rams in NFC Wild Card Game
SEA	2021	7	10	0	.412	4th in NFC West	—	—	—	—
SEA	2022	9	8	0	.529	2nd in NFC West	0	1	.000	Lost to San Francisco 49ers in NFC Wild Card Game
SEA	2023	9	8	0	.529	3rd in NFC West	—	—	—	—
SEA total		137	89	1	.606		10	9	.526	
LV	2025	3	14	0	.176	4th in AFC West	—	—	—	—
LV total		3	14	0	.176		0	0	–	
Total		173	134	1	.563		11	11	.500	

=== College ===
Year	Team	Overall	Conference	Standing	Bowl/playoffs	Coaches^{#}	AP^{°}
USC Trojans (Pacific-10 Conference) (2001–2009)
2001	USC	6–6	5–3	5th	L Las Vegas		
2002	USC	11–2	7–1	T–1st	W Orange^{†}	4	4
2003	USC	12–1	7–1	1st	W Rose^{†}	2	1
2004	USC	13–0 (Note: As a result of the 2011 NCAA sanctions imposed on USC because of the ineligibility of Reggie Bush, two of the Trojans' victories were vacated, including one Pac-10 conference victory and their Orange Bowl victory.)	8–0	1st	V (Note: As a result of action taken by the BCS presidents' oversight committee on June 6, 2011, the Trojans' BCS Championship has been vacated. No successor champion was designated, and there is no BCS champion for the 2004–2005 college football season.) Orange^{†}	1	1 (Note: As of June 7, 2011, USC still retains the AP Poll championship for the 2004 season.)
2005	USC	12–1 (Note: As a result of the 2011 NCAA sanctions imposed on Southern Cal because of the ineligibility of Reggie Bush, all twelve of the Trojans' regular season victories were vacated, including eight Pac-10 conference victories, as well as the Rose Bowl loss)	8–0	1st	L Rose^{†}	2	2
2006	USC	11–2	7–2	T–1st	W Rose^{†}	4	4
2007	USC	11–2	7–2	T–1st	W Rose^{†}	2	3
2008	USC	12–1	8–1	1st	W Rose^{†}	2	3
2009	USC	9–4	5–4	T–5th	W Emerald	20	22
USC:		97–19	62–14				
Total:		97–19					
National championship Conference title Conference division title or championship game berth
^{†}Indicates BCS bowl.; ^{#}Rankings from final Coaches Poll.

== Coaching tree ==
Carroll has worked under ten head coaches:

- Chester Caddas: University of the Pacific (1973–1976)
- Lou Holtz: Arkansas Razorbacks (1977)
- Earle Bruce: Iowa State Cyclones (1978), Ohio State Buckeyes (1979)
- Monte Kiffin: NC State Wolfpack (1980–1982)
- Bob Cope: University of the Pacific (1983)
- Kay Stephenson: Buffalo Bills (1984)
- Bud Grant: Minnesota Vikings (1985)
- Jerry Burns: Minnesota Vikings (1986–1989)
- Bruce Coslet: New York Jets (1990–1993)
- George Seifert: San Francisco 49ers (1995–1996)

Seventeen of Carroll's assistant coaches became NFL or NCAA head coaches:

- Walt Harris, Pitt (1997–2004); Stanford (2005–2006)
- Nick Holt, Idaho (2004–2005)
- Ed Orgeron, Ole Miss (2005–2007); USC (2013, interim); LSU (2017–2021)
- Greg Robinson, Syracuse (2005–2008)
- Lane Kiffin, Oakland Raiders (2007–2008); Tennessee (2009); USC (2010–2013); Florida Atlantic (2017–2019); Ole Miss (2020–2025); LSU (2026-present)
- Sparky Woods, VMI (2008–2012)
- Bo Pelini, Nebraska (2008–2014); Youngstown State (2015–2019)
- Steve Sarkisian, Washington (2009–2013); USC (2014–2015); Texas (2021–present)
- DeWayne Walker, New Mexico State (2009–2012)
- Norm Chow, Hawaii (2012–2015)
- Larry Kennan, Incarnate Word (2012–2017)
- Gus Bradley, Jacksonville Jaguars (2013–2016)
- Dan Quinn, Atlanta Falcons (2015–2020), Washington Commanders (2024–present)
- Jedd Fisch, Arizona (2021–2023), Washington (2024–present)
- Robert Saleh, New York Jets (2021–2024), Tennessee Titans (2026-present)
- Dave Canales, Carolina Panthers (2024–present)
- Brian Schottenheimer, Dallas Cowboys (2025–present)

Eight of Carroll's executives became general managers in the NFL:

- Charley Armey, St. Louis Rams (2000–2005)
- John Idzik Jr., New York Jets (2013–2014)
- Jason Licht, Tampa Bay Buccaneers (2014–present)
- Scot McCloughan, Washington Redskins (2015–2016)
- Chris Grier, Miami Dolphins (2016–2025)
- Scott Fitterer, Carolina Panthers (2021–2023)
- Dan Morgan, Carolina Panthers (2024–present)
- Nolan Teasley, Minnesota Vikings (2026-present)

One of Carroll's former players became NFL or NCAA head coaches:

- Aaron Glenn, New York Jets (2025–present)

== Personal awards ==
=== 2003 ===
- 2003 American Football Coaches Association Division I-A Coach of the Year
- Home Depot National Coach of the Year
- Maxwell Club College Coach of the Year
- ESPN.com National Coach of the Year
- Pigskin Club of Washington, D.C. Coach of the Year
- All-American Football Foundation Frank Leahy Co-Coach of the Year
- Pac-10 Co-Coach of the Year

=== 2004 ===
- 2004 National Quarterback Club College Coach of the Year
- 2004 ESPN.com Pac-10 Coach of the Year

=== 2005 ===
- Pac-10 Co-Coach of the Year
- United States Sports Academy Amos Alonzo Stagg Coaching Award

=== 2006 ===
- Pac-10 Coach of the Year

=== 2014 ===
- PFWA's Jack Horrigan Award
- ESPY Award for Best Coach (Nominated)

== Coaching style ==
On offense, Carroll is known for using aggressive play-calling that is open to trick plays as well as "going for it" on 4th down instead of punting the ball away. Because of his aggressive style, the USC band gave him the nickname "Big Balls Pete". At USC home games, when Carroll decided to go for it on 4th down, the USC band would start a chant of "Big Balls Pete" that carried over to the students section and the alumni.

On defense, Carroll favors a bend-but-don't-break scheme of preventing the big plays: allowing opposing teams to get small yardage but trying to keep the plays in front of his defenders.

Carroll draws coaching inspiration from the 1974 book The Inner Game of Tennis by tennis coach W. Timothy Gallwey, which he picked up as graduate student at the University of the Pacific; he summarizes the philosophy he took from the book as "all about clearing the clutter in the interactions between your conscious and subconscious mind", enabled "through superior practice and a clear approach. Focus, clarity and belief in yourself are what allows [sic] you to express your ability without discursive thoughts and concerns." He wrote a foreword for a later edition, noting that athletes "must clear their minds of all confusion and earn the ability to let themselves play freely." He also cites influences from psychologists Abraham Maslow and Carl Jung, Buddhist meditation master Chögyam Trungpa, and Zen master D. T. Suzuki.

"Reading Wooden, I realized: If I'm gonna be a competitor, if I'm ever going to do great things, I'm going to have to carry a message that's strong and clear and nobody's going to miss the point ever about what I'm all about. . . . Jerry Garcia said that he didn't want his band to be the best ones doing something. He wanted them to be the only ones doing it. To be all by yourself out there doing something that nobody else can touch — that's the thought that guides me, that guides this program: We're going to do things better than it's ever been done before in everything we do, and we're going to compete our ass off. And we're gonna see how far that takes us."
— Carroll on how John Wooden and Jerry Garcia influenced his coaching philosophy.

After he was fired by the New England Patriots, Carroll read a book by former UCLA basketball coach John Wooden which heavily influenced how he later ran his program at USC: emulating Wooden, Carroll decided to engineer his program in the way that best exemplified his personal philosophy. He decided his philosophy was best summarized as "I'm a competitor". As a fan of the Grateful Dead, Carroll then tied Wooden's thoughts into those by Jerry Garcia, and decided that he wanted his football program to not be the best, but the only program following his competitive philosophy.

Carroll is known for his high-energy and often pleasant demeanor when coaching. In explaining his enthusiasm, Carroll has stated, "I always think something good's just about to happen." In a 2005 interview, Carroll explained his motivation:

I feel like I should be playing now. What really pissed me off was going to the WFL (World Football League) and getting cut and having the NFL go on strike and not being able to get a connection with the scabs (replacement players). Just one game and I think I would have been happy. Absolutely it was a motivator for me later in life. It's one of the biggest reasons I've been coaching all these years. I tell the players all the time, I wish I was doing what they were doing.

Carroll has been known to plan elaborate surprises and pranks during practice to lighten the mood and reward the players; notable examples include using a Halloween practice to stage a fake argument and subsequent falling death of running back LenDale White, having defensive end Everson Griffen arrested by the Los Angeles Police Department during a team meeting for "physically abusing" freshman offensive linemen, and several pranks involving USC alumnus and comedic actor Will Ferrell. During practices, Carroll frequently gets involved doing drills: running sprints and routes as well as throwing the ball. Under Carroll, nearly all USC practices were open to the public, a move that was uncommon among programs; he believed that having fans at practice helped his team prepare, making mundane drills seem more interesting, causing players to perform at a high level when they know they have an audience and preparing them for larger crowds on game days.

Despite his penchant for humor, Carroll's USC program had strictly prescribed routines that covered what players were allowed to eat, the vocabulary they used, and the theme of daily practices. Under his tenure, days had descriptive nicknames like Tell the Truth Monday, Competition Tuesday, Turnover Wednesday.

Carroll favorably compared college recruiting to any other competition, and enjoys the ability to recruit talent, which he was unable to do in the NFL. He likens being a college head coach to being both the "coach and general manager."

== Philanthropy ==
After moving to Los Angeles, Carroll was affected by the number of gang-related murders taking place in poorer areas. In April 2003, Carroll helped organize a meeting with political leaders, high-ranking law enforcement officials and representatives from social service, education and faith-based communities at USC's Heritage Hall for a brainstorming session. The result was the founding of A Better LA, a charity devoted to reducing violence in targeted urban areas of Los Angeles.

=== Work with children ===
In April 2009, Carroll launched CampPete.com, a multi-player online game "billed as a ground-breaking Web site aimed at bringing Coach Carroll's unique Win Forever philosophy to kids all over the country by taking advantage of one of the hottest technology trends online, the virtual world." The site, which can be accessed by creating a virtual avatar, includes arcade-style games, motivational messages from Coach Carroll and a sports trivia section as well as a collection of virtual football skills workshops for kids. A portion of the proceeds from CampPete.com go to support A Better LA.

== Personal life ==
Carroll and his wife, Glena, have three children, Brennan, Jaime, and Nate. Brennan and Nate have been part of the Seattle Seahawks coaching staff and worked as assistants under Carroll during his one season with the Las Vegas Raiders.

== See also ==
- List of National Football League head coaches with 50 wins
- List of Super Bowl head coaches
