= 2003 Boston College Eagles football team =

American college football season

2003 Boston College Eagles football
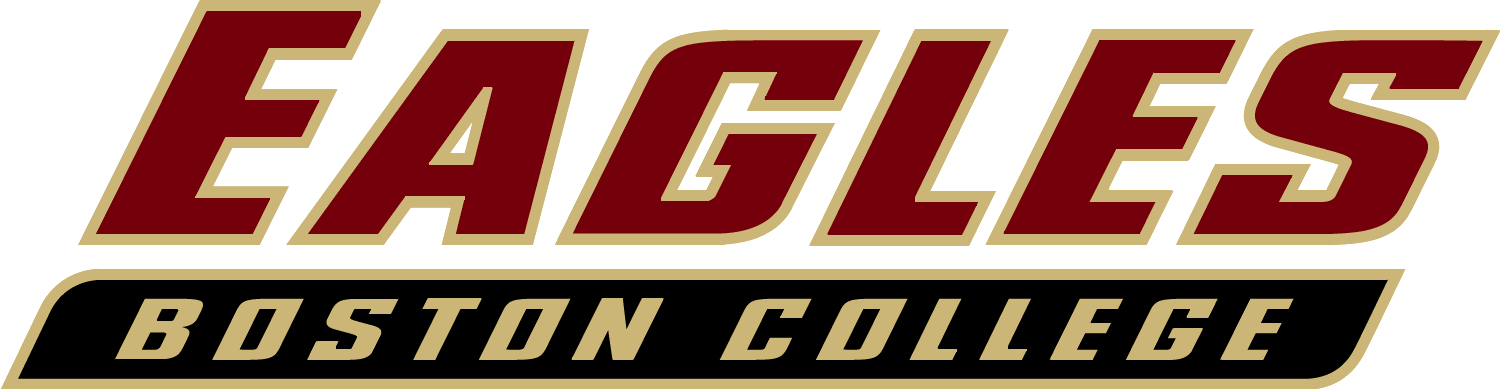

San Francisco Bowl champion

San Francisco Bowl, W 35–21 vs. Colorado State
- Conference: Big East Conference
- Record: 8–5 (3–4 Big East)
- Head coach: Tom O'Brien (7th season)
- Offensive coordinator: Dana Bible (5th season)
- Offensive scheme: Pro-style
- Defensive coordinator: Frank Spaziani (5th season)
- Base defense: 4–3
- Captains: Augie Hoffmann; Josh Ott
- Home stadium: Alumni Stadium

2003 Big East Conference football standings
	Conf.			Overall
Team	W		L	W		L
No. 5 Miami (FL) $+	6	–	1	11	–	2
West Virginia +	6	–	1	8	–	5
Pittsburgh	5	–	2	8	–	5
Virginia Tech	4	–	3	8	–	5
Boston College	3	–	4	8	–	5
Syracuse	2	–	5	6	–	6
Rutgers	2	–	5	5	–	7
Temple	0	–	7	1	–	11
$ – BCS representative as conference champion; + – Conference co-champions; Rankings from AP Poll

The 2003 Boston College Eagles football team represented Boston College during the 2003 NCAA Division I-A football season. Boston College was a member of the Big East Conference. The Eagles played their home games at Alumni Stadium in Chestnut Hill, Massachusetts, which has been their home stadium since 1957.

== Schedule ==
Date	Time	Opponent	Site	TV	Result	Attendance
August 30	1:00 p.m.	Wake Forest*	Alumni Stadium; Chestnut Hill, MA		L 28–32	42,563
September 6	12:00 p.m.	at Penn State*	Beaver Stadium; University Park, PA	ABC	W 27–14	106,445
September 13	12:00 p.m.	at Connecticut*	Rentschler Field; East Hartford, CT	ESPN+	W 24–14	40,000
September 20	7:45 p.m.	No. 2 Miami (FL)	Alumni Stadium; Chestnut Hill, MA	ESPN	L 14–33	44,500
September 27	1:00 p.m.	Ball State*	Alumni Stadium; Chestnut Hill, MA		W 53–29	42,353
October 11	3:30 p.m.	at Temple	Lincoln Financial Field; Philadelphia, PA	NESN	W 38–13	21,862
October 18	12:00 p.m.	at Syracuse	Carrier Dome; Syracuse, NY	ESPN+	L 14–39	45,313
October 25	12:00 p.m.	Notre Dame*	Alumni Stadium; Chestnut Hill, MA (Holy War)	ABC	W 27–25	44,500
November 1	1:00 p.m.	Pittsburgh	Alumni Stadium; Chestnut Hill, MA		L 13–24	41,983
November 8	12:00 p.m.	West Virginia	Alumni Stadium; Chestnut Hill, MA	ESPN+	L 28–35	39,723
November 15	3:30 p.m.	at Rutgers	Rutgers Stadium; Piscataway, NJ	NESN	W 35–25	31,019
November 22	3:30 p.m.	at No. 12 Virginia Tech	Lane Stadium; Blacksburg, VA (rivalry)	ESPN	W 34–27	65,115
December 31	10:30 p.m.	vs. Colorado State*	Pacific Bell Park; San Francisco, CA (San Francisco Bowl)	ESPN2	W 35–21	25,621
*Non-conference game; Rankings from AP Poll released prior to the game; All times are in Eastern time

== Roster ==
2003 Boston College Eagles football team roster
Players
Coaches
Offense 6 Lester, Larry So. WR 13 Sele, Taylor Rsf. WR 6-0 197 Lawrence Academy/Richmond Hill, NY 63 Moore, Shadu Rsf. OG 6-1 295 Paterson Catholic/Paterson, NJ 64 Leavitt, Keith Sr. OT 6-7 339 Fitchburg/Fitchburg, MA . 65 Hathy, Chris So. C 6-4 308 Mount Lebanon/Pittsburgh, PA 70 Marten, James Rsf. OT 6-8 298 Brebeuf Jesuit/Indianapolis, IN

Pos.	#	Name	Class
WR	5	Grant Adams	Jr
RB	8	Michael Lawson	Jr
QB	10	Dan Berglund	Fr
QB	12	Matt Ryan	Fr
QB	14	Karim El Nokali	Fr
QB	15	Quinton Porter	So
FB	16	Greg Toal	Sr
WR	17	Joel Hazard	Jr
QB	18	Paul Peterson	Jr
RB	28	Horace Dodd	Sr
RB	38	Jeff Ross	Fr
C	61	Kevin Sheridan	Fr
C	66	Pat Ross	So
G	67	Tom Anevski	Fr
OT	72	Jeremy Trueblood	So
OT	74	Ryan Poles	Fr
G	75	Josh Beekman	Fr
G	76	Chris Snee	Sr
TE	89	Sean Ryan	Sr

Defense 21 Mueller, Brad Fr. CB 6-0 175 Mars Area/Valencia, PA 24 Glasper, Ryan Fr. FS 43 Lankford, Ray Fr. LB 6-3 225 McKeesport/McKeesport, PA 92 Hunter, Myran Jr. DE 6-2 239 Lincoln/Tallahassee, FL 93 Mettling, Phillip Jr. DE 6-3 255 St. Xavier/Louisville, KY

Pos.	#	Name	Class
CB	1	Will Blackmon	So
LB	3	Ray Henderson	So
CB	4	Jazzmen Williams	So
SS	7	Nathanael Hasselbeck	So
SS	9	Larry Anam	Fr
FS	23	T. J. Stancil	Jr
DB	36	Brian Flores	Sr
DB	41	Kevin Sanz	Jr
LB	42	Jon Misiewicz	So
SS	44	Jamie Silva	Fr
LB	45	Josh Ott	Sr
DT	90	Tom Martin	Sr
DT	91	Robert Ziminski	Fr
DE	94	Mathias Kiwanuka	So
DT	96	Tim Bulman	Jr
DT	97	Leonard Bennett	Sr
DT	98	Douglas Goodwin	Sr

Special teams

Pos.	#	Name	Class
K	11	Mike Fassel	Jr

Head coach

- Tom O'Brien

Coordinators/assistant coaches

Legend

- (C) Team captain
- (S) Suspended
- (I) Ineligible
- Injured
- Redshirt

Roster
Last update: 2003-12-03

== Drafted Players (2004 NFL Draft) ==
2004	2	2	34	Chris Snee	New York Giants	G
2004	5	12	144	Sean Ryan	Dallas Cowboys	TE
