= Brennan Carroll =

American football player and coach (born 1979)

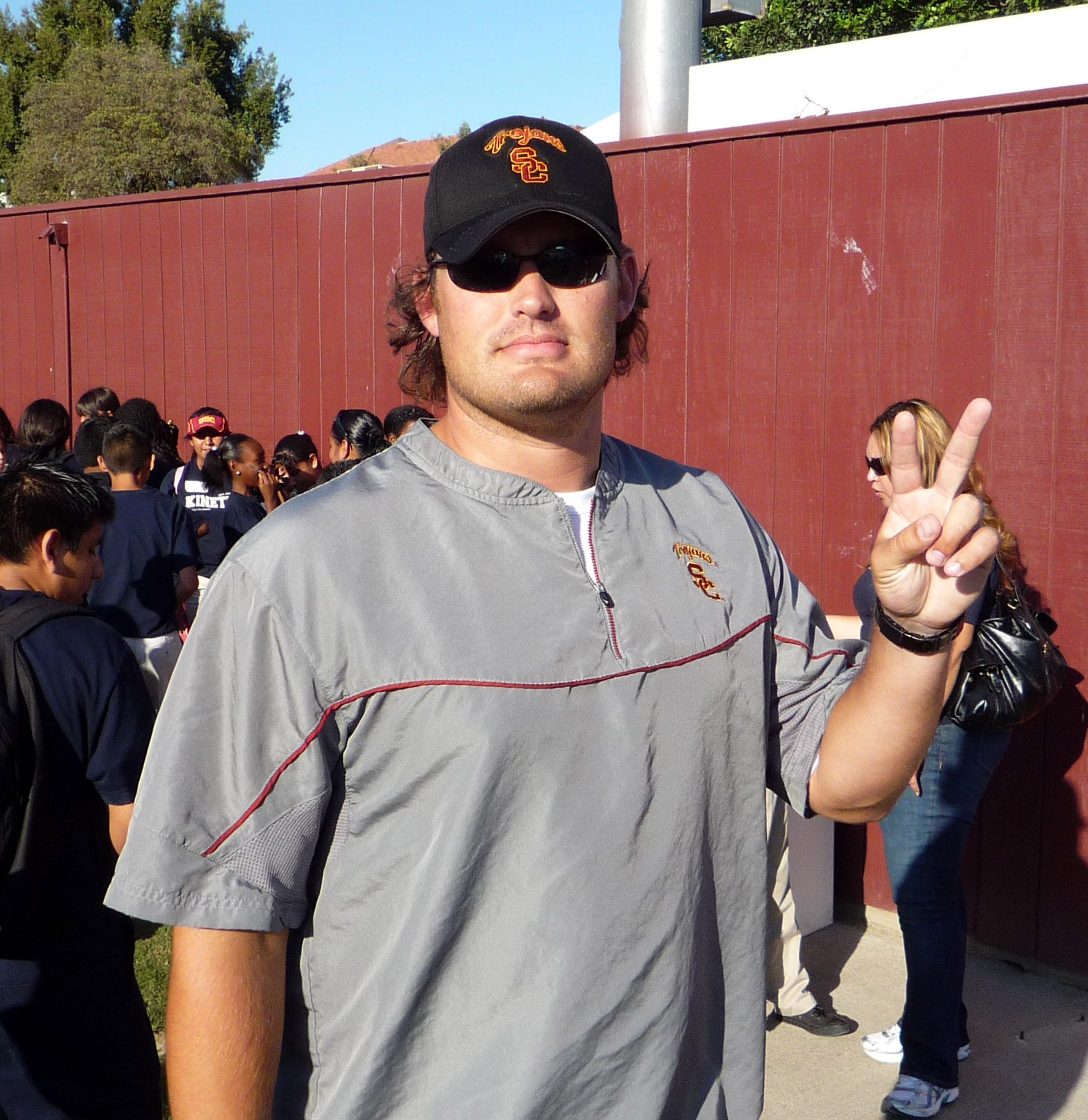
- Carroll with the USC Trojans in 2008

Personal information
- Born: March 20, 1979 (age 47); Columbus, Ohio, U.S.

Career information
- Position: Tight end
- High school: Saratoga (California)
- College: Delaware (1997); Pittsburgh (1999–2001)

Career history
- USC (2002–2003) Graduate assistant; USC (2004–2009) Tight ends coach; Seattle Seahawks (2010) Offensive assistant; Miami (FL) (2011–2012) Tight ends coach; Miami (FL) (2013–2014) Wide receivers coach; Seattle Seahawks (2015–2019) Assistant offensive line coach; Seattle Seahawks (2020) Run game coordinator; Arizona (2021–2023) Offensive coordinator & offensive line coach; Washington (2024) Offensive coordinator & offensive line coach; Las Vegas Raiders (2025) Offensive line coach & Run game cordinator

Awards and highlights
- 2× AP National College Football Champion (2003, 2004)

Brennan Carroll (born March 20, 1979) is an American professional football coach who most recently served as offensive line coach for the Las Vegas Raiders of the National Football League (NFL). He formerly served as the offensive coordinator and offensive line coach for the University of Washington. He also coached for USC, Miami (FL), Arizona, and the Seattle Seahawks of the National Football League (NFL). He played college football for Delaware and Pittsburgh as a tight end. He is the son of former New York Jets, New England Patriots, USC, Seattle Seahawks, and Las Vegas Raiders head coach Pete Carroll and is the brother of Raiders assistant quarterbacks coach Nate Carroll.

== Early life ==
Carroll played high school football at Saratoga High School in Saratoga, California, graduating in 1997.

== College career ==
Carroll played college football as a tight end at the University of Pittsburgh (1999–2001), after transferring from the University of Delaware (1997).

== Coaching career ==
In 2002, Carroll joined the USC Trojans staff as a graduate assistant under his father, head coach Pete Carroll. During his first season, he worked with offense and special teams, and switched to tight ends the next year. In 2004, he became the full-time assistant coach in charge of tight ends. In 2007, in addition to his work as an assistant coach, he became the recruiting coordinator. Also in 2007, Trojans tight end Fred Davis, who Brennan coached, won the John Mackey Award, which goes to the nation's top tight end.

On December 22, 2010, Carroll joined Al Golden's staff at the University of Miami as the tight ends coach and recruiting coordinator. On January 10, 2013, Carroll moved to wide receivers coach, while retaining the recruiting coordinator title, after the Hurricanes hired Mario Cristobal as associate head coach and tight ends coach.

After thirteen years in the collegiate ranks, Carroll joined his first NFL staff on February 9, 2015, reuniting with his father Pete, then the head coach of the Seattle Seahawks. Carroll was hired as the assistant offensive line coach, and was promoted to run game coordinator prior to the 2020 season.

On January 1, 2021, Carroll joined the University of Arizona staff under new head coach Jedd Fisch as offensive coordinator and offensive line coach; they had worked together at Miami. In 2023, Arizona improved to 10–3, concluding with a 38–24 win over Oklahoma in the Alamo Bowl; the Wildcats finished eleventh in both major polls.

Carroll was one of several coaches to follow Fisch to the University of Washington in 2024, where he was the offensive coordinator and offensive line coach.

On February 3, 2025, Carroll was hired by the Las Vegas Raiders to coach the team's offensive line.

== Personal life ==
Carroll's father is former NFL head coach Pete Carroll and his brother Nate was formerly the senior offensive assistant for the Seattle Seahawks. Nate was the assistant quarterbacks coach for the Las Vegas Raiders.

Brennan Carroll and his wife Amber have one son, Dillon Brennan Carroll.
