= Nate Carroll =

American football coach (born 1987)

Personal information
- Born: March 24, 1987 (age 39); Edina, Minnesota, U.S.

Career information
- High school: Palos Verdes Peninsula; (Rolling Hills Estates, California)
- College: USC

Career history

Coaching
- Seattle Seahawks (2011–2023); Defensive assistant (2011–2012); Offensive assistant (2013); Assistant wide receivers coach (2014–2017); Wide receivers coach (2018–2021); Senior offensive assistant (2022–2023); Carolina Panthers (2024) Passing game coordinator; Las Vegas Raiders (2025) Assistant quarterbacks coach

Operations
- Seattle Seahawks (2010–2011) Personnel assistant

Awards and highlights
- Super Bowl champion (2013)

Nate Carroll (born March 24, 1987) is an American football coach who most recently served as the assistant quarterbacks coach for the Las Vegas Raiders of the National Football League (NFL). He has spent his career working for his father Pete, former head coach of the Seattle Seahawks and former head coach of the Las Vegas Raiders.

== Playing career ==
A three-star athlete in high school, Carroll was recruited mostly by small schools including San Diego, then coached by Jim Harbaugh. Carroll did not intend to play college football and enrolled at the University of Southern California, where his father was coaching. He graduated from USC in 2010 with a degree in psychology.

== Coaching career ==
=== Seattle Seahawks ===
Unsure of what to do after graduation, the younger Carroll was offered a job by his father to work for the Seattle Seahawks as a personnel assistant in the scouting department for one season before being named a defensive assistant in 2011. Initially offered a coaching position with the Jacksonville Jaguars by former Seahawks defensive coordinator and newly hired head coach Gus Bradley, Carroll shifted to offensive assistant in 2013. He was a member of the coaching staff that defeated the Denver Broncos in Super Bowl XLVIII, giving Carroll his first Super Bowl victory. He was promoted to assistant wide receivers coach in 2014, working with Kippy Brown and later Dave Canales. Carroll served as the team's wide receivers coach from 2018 to 2021.

=== Carolina Panthers ===
On February 15, 2024, Carroll was named as the passing game coordinator for the Carolina Panthers. The Panthers parted ways with Carroll on January 17, 2025.

=== Las Vegas Raiders ===
On February 11, 2025, the Las Vegas Raiders hired Carroll to serve as their assistant quarterbacks coach.

== Personal life ==
Carroll's father is Pete Carroll and his brother Brennan was most recently the offensive line coach for the Las Vegas Raiders. Carroll and his wife Anna have two sons.
