= Ted Leland =

American college administrator

Biographical details
- Born: 1948 or 1949 (age 77–78)

Playing career

Football
- c. 1967: Chabot
- c. 1969: Pacific
- Position: Defensive end

Coaching career (HC unless noted)

Football
- –1973: Pacific (DL)
- 1974–?: East Tennessee State (LB/E)
- –1977: Pacific (LB/DE)
- 1978: Stanford (assistant)

Administrative career (AD unless noted)
- 1979–1981: Houston (assistant AD)
- 1981–1983: Northwestern (senior associate AD)
- 1983–1989: Dartmouth
- 1989–1991: Pacific
- 1991–2005: Stanford
- 2011–2017: Pacific

Edward "Ted" Leland (born 1948 or 1949) is an American former college administrator. He served as athletic director at Dartmouth College, the University of the Pacific and Stanford University. He holds the all-time record for national championships as an athletic director.

== Early life and education ==
A Northern California native, Leland attended Hayward High School and then Chabot College in Hayward. He played football as a defensive lineman at Chabot and later continued at the University of the Pacific (UOP). At Pacific, he was a first-team All-Pacific Coast Athletic Association defensive end in 1969 and named the team's most valuable player in his senior year. In college, Leland also competed in track and wrestling. He was inducted into Chabot's Hall of Fame in 2000 and into the Stockton Athletics Hall of Fame in 2015. He earned both a bachelor's degree in physical education (1970) and master's degree in sports psychology (1972) from UOP before completing a doctorate in education/sport psychology from Stanford University in 1982.

After college, Leland began coaching football at Pacific in the early 1970s, starting as defensive line coach. He then became the linebackers and ends coach for the East Tennessee State Buccaneers in 1974. Leland later returned to Pacific as linebackers and defensive ends coach before leaving for Stanford University in 1978. At Stanford, he worked as assistant football coach and instructor of physical education during the 1978–79 school year.

Leland served as an adjunct professor in sports psychology and philosophy of sport at Dartmouth College, UOP and Stanford.

== Administrative career ==
Before securing his first director of athletics position, Leland was an assistant athletic director at the University of Houston from 1979 to 1981 and senior associate athletic director at Northwestern University from 1981 to 1983.

=== Dartmouth College (1983–1989) ===
Leland was selected as the director of athletics at Dartmouth College in 1983. Under Leland's direction, Dartmouth teams won 18 Ivy League championships, and during the 1988–89 academic year the Big Green's Ivy League win–loss record was its best in 29 years.

=== University of the Pacific (1989–1991) ===
Leland stepped down from Dartmouth at the end of 1988 and became the athletic director at UOP.

=== Stanford University (1991-2005) ===
In June 1991, Leland was hired as athletic director at Stanford University. He served 14 years in this position, from 1991 to 2005. During this time, Leland directed Stanford to 57 national titles in 14 sports, along with 173 conference titles. He holds the all-time records as athletic director for total college championships, number of sports to win a national title in, and most in a single year (six, in 1996–97). Stanford captured 11 NACDA Directors' Cups under Leland, given to the top athletic program nationally. He helped raise more than $270 million in private donations and increased Stanford Athletic Department’s endowments and reserves from $50 million to $625 million.

In June 2002, U.S. Secretary of Education Rod Paige named Leland co-chairman of the U.S. Secretary of Education's Commission on Opportunity in Athletics, a panel which "examined ways of strengthening enforcement of Title IX (the anti-discrimination law) and expanding opportunities to ensure fairness for all college athletes".

Leland left Stanford on January 1, 2006. He was inducted to Stanford's Hall of Fame in 2006 and into the NACDA Hall of Fame in 2008.

=== University of the Pacific (second stint, 2006–2017) ===
Leland returned to UOP as vice president for university advancement in 2006, overseeing fundraising and alumni relations. He helped reorganize the school's annual giving operation, including the Pacific Fund Grants which were given to undergraduates starting in 2007. During his service at UOP, he played a part in getting the school its largest gift ever, a $100 million donation from the estate of Robert and Jeannette Powell.

Leland became athletic director for the second time at UOP in 2011, serving until retiring in 2017.

During his career, Leland led or partnered in the initiation, programming and/or funding of 62 athletic facility projects with an estimated cost of $486.7 million. At Stanford, he shepherded the construction or renovation of $185 million worth of facilities, including the $23-million Arrillaga Family Sports Center, the $25-million remodeling of Maples Pavilion, the track and swimming complexes, the tennis and softball stadiums, as well as the rugby, soccer and field hockey fields. The renovation of Stanford Stadium was just beginning as Leland was set to depart.

Street & Smith's Sports Business Journal named Leland among its Top 20 "Most Influential" in college athletics in 2004. He received the 2004 Dick Enberg Award from the College Sports Information Directors of America, for his "commitment to education and student-athletes". He was inducted into the California Community College Football Coaches Association Hall of Fame in 2007.

== Personal life ==
Leland and his wife, Stefanie, have two children.
