= Stanley Havili =

American football player (born 1987)

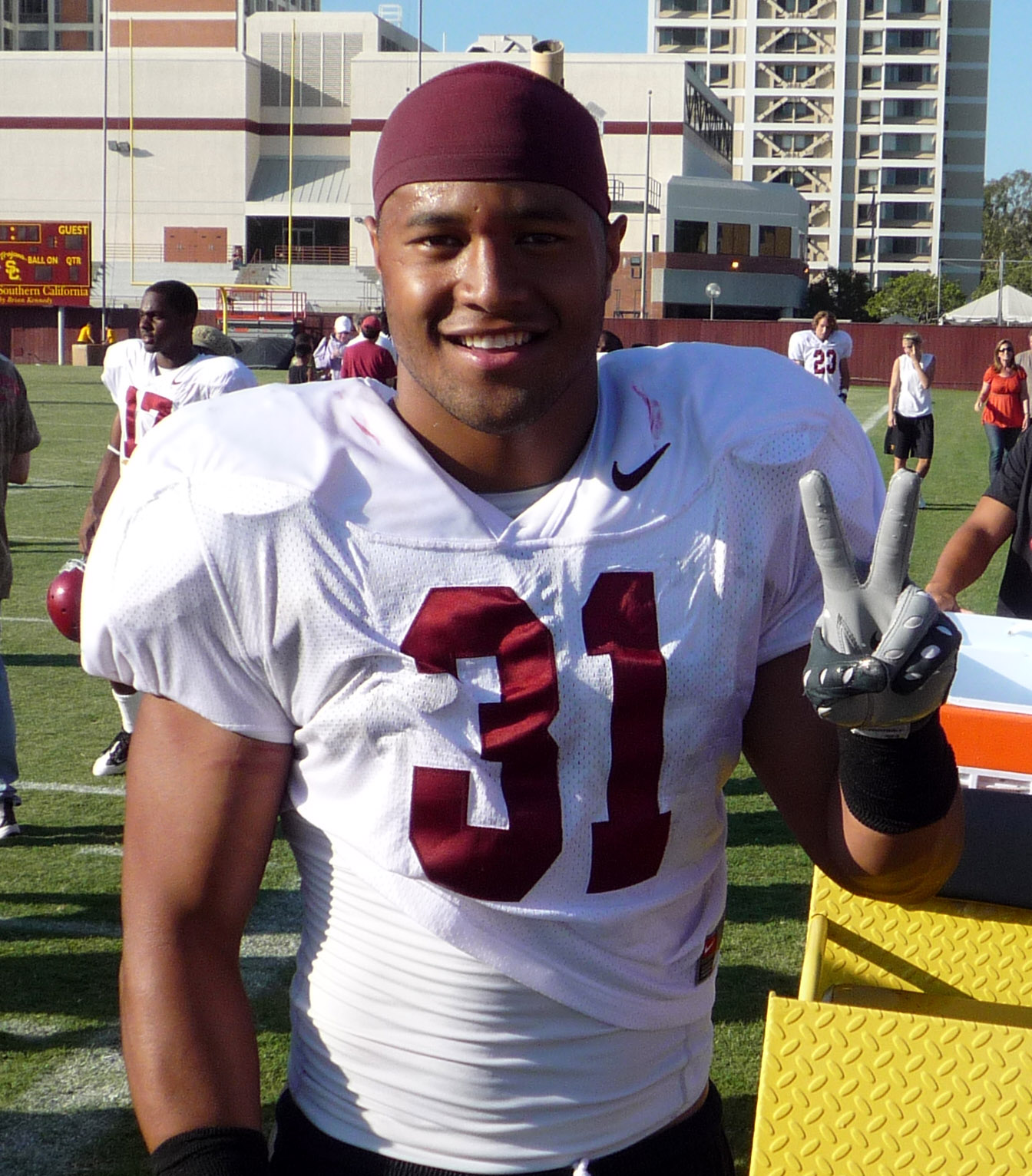
- Havili making the USC "V" for victory sign after a 2008 fall practice

No. 39
- Position: Fullback

Personal information
- Born: November 14, 1987 (age 38); Salt Lake City, Utah, U.S.
- Listed height: 6 ft 0 in (1.83 m)
- Listed weight: 243 lb (110 kg)

Career information
- High school: Cottonwood (Murray, Utah)
- College: USC
- NFL draft: 2011: 7th round, 240th overall pick

Career history
- Philadelphia Eagles (2011–2012); Indianapolis Colts (2013–2014); Seattle Seahawks (2014)*
- * Offseason or practice squad member only

Career NFL statistics
- Rushing attempts: 13
- Rushing yards: 29
- Rushing touchdowns: 1
- Receptions: 25
- Receiving yards: 171
- Receiving touchdowns: 1
- Stats at Pro Football Reference

Stanley Havili (born November 14, 1987) is an American former professional football player who was a fullback in the National Football League (NFL). He was selected by the Philadelphia Eagles in the seventh round of the 2011 NFL draft. He played college football for the USC Trojans.

== Early life and family ==
Havili's parents, Tevita and Elva, were Tongan immigrants. His father, Tevita, raised eight children on a bus-driver salary in Salt Lake City.

Havili attended East High (Salt Lake City) as a freshman, then transferred to Cottonwood High School in Murray, Utah, where he earned all-state honors at Cottonwood High, compiling 2,652 all-purpose yards and 32 touchdowns as a senior. While a junior, he suffered a shoulder injury and as family couldn't afford physical therapy, he never rehabbed it properly and has played with a weakened left shoulder ever since. As of 2010, he estimates it has popped out of its socket 10-11 times; when it does he usually pops it back in and returns to the field.

== College career ==
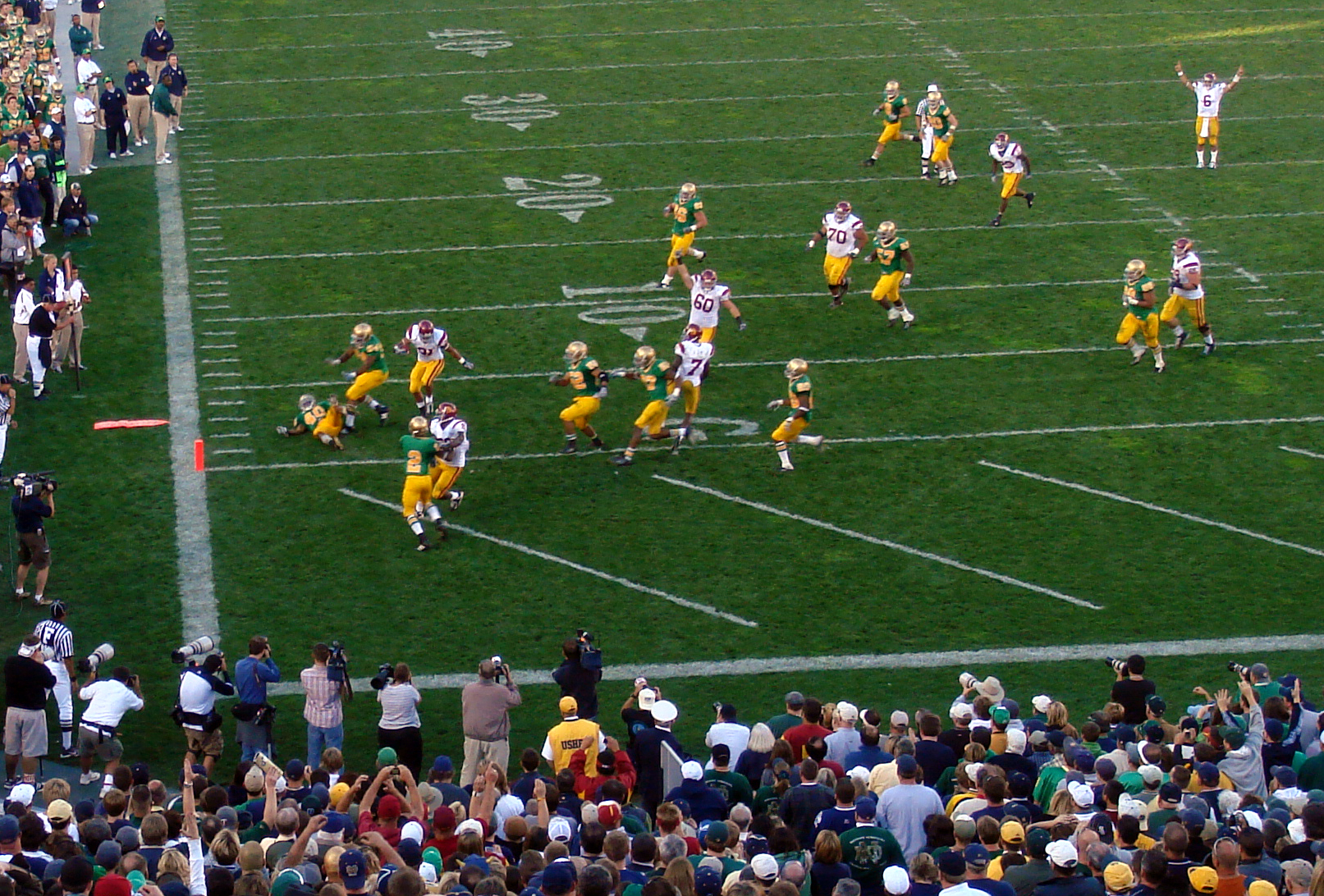
Havili hops into the end zone for a touchdown against Notre Dame in 2007.

Havili earned playing time during his true freshman season at USC in 2006. During the third game of the season versus Arizona, Havili broke his leg and was out for the rest of the season. Because the injury happened early in the season, he was granted a medical redshirt by the NCAA. Havili started all of his 2007 redshirt freshman season for USC. While starting all 13 games, he gained 134 yards on 21 carries (6.4 avg.) with 2 touchdowns and caught 34 passes for 248 yards (7.3 avg.) with 5 touchdowns. He was a 2007 Phil Steele's All-Pac-10 honorable mention pick. At Nebraska, he ran for 52 yards on 2 carries (including a 50-yarder on USC's opening play) with a 2-yard touchdown run and caught 3 passes for 22 yards with a 5-yard touchdown.

He returned to start his redshirt sophomore year, however was declared academically ineligible for the final game in the 2009 Rose Bowl. For the 2010 season, Havili was elected as a co-captain by his teammates.

Havili was former Jets quarterback Mark Sanchez's college roommate during Sanchez's tenure at USC.

Havili ended his USC career with the most receptions of any fullback in school history.

== Professional career ==
Pre-draft measurables
Height	Weight	Arm length	Hand span	Wingspan
6 ft 0 1/4 in (1.84 m)	227 lb (103 kg)	31 in (0.79 m)	9 1/4 in (0.23 m)	6 ft 0 1/2 in (1.84 m)
All values from the NFL Combine

=== Philadelphia Eagles ===
Havili was selected by the Philadelphia Eagles in the seventh round (240th overall) of the 2011 NFL draft. He was signed to a four-year contract on July 27, 2011. On September 2, Havili was released by the Eagles in the final round of roster cuts before the start of the regular season. He was re-signed to the team's practice squad on September 4. At the conclusion of the 2011 season, his practice squad contract expired and he became a free agent. He was re-signed to the active roster on January 2, 2012.

=== Indianapolis Colts ===
Havili was traded to the Indianapolis Colts on March 28, 2013, in exchange for Clifton Geathers. He was released on November 4, 2014.

=== Seattle Seahawks ===
Havili was signed to the Seattle Seahawks' practice squad on November 12, 2014. He was released by Seattle on December 5.
