= 2003 San Francisco Bowl =

2003 Diamond Walnut San Francisco Bowl
Boston College Eagles	Colorado State Rams
(7–5)	(7–5)
Big East	Mountain West
35	21
Head coach: Tom O'Brien	Head coach: Sonny Lubick
	1	2	3	4	Total
Boston College	21	0	0	14	35
Colorado State	0	7	7	7	21
- Date: December 31, 2003
- Season: 2003
- Stadium: Pacific Bell Park
- Location: San Francisco
- Referee: John Laurie (Big XII)
- Attendance: 25,621

United States TV coverage
- Network: ESPN2
- Announcers: Mark Malone (Play-by-Play); Mike Golic (Color Analyst)

The 2003 San Francisco Bowl was the second edition of the post-season college football bowl game between the Colorado State Rams and the Boston College Eagles at Pacific Bell Park in San Francisco on December 31, 2003. The game was the final contest of the 2003 NCAA Division I-A football season for both teams, and ended in a 35–21 victory for Boston College.
