= 2013 BYU Cougars football team =

American college football season

2013 BYU Cougars football

Fight Hunger Bowl, L 16–31 vs. Washington
- Conference: Independent
- Record: 8–5
- Head coach: Bronco Mendenhall (9th season)
- Offensive coordinator: Robert Anae (7th season)
- Offensive scheme: Air raid
- Defensive coordinator: Nick Howell (1st season)
- Base defense: 3–4
- Captains: Uani Unga (Defense) Daniel Sorensen (Defense); JD Falslev (Offense) Skylar Ridley (Offense)
- Home stadium: LaVell Edwards Stadium

2013 NCAA Division I FBS independents football records
	Conf.			Overall
Team	W		L	W		L
No. 20 Notre Dame*		–		9	–	4
Navy		–		9	–	4
BYU		–		8	–	5
Army		–		3	–	9
New Mexico State		–		2	–	10
Idaho		–		1	–	11
*All wins for Notre Dame (9–4) in the 2013 season were later vacated; Rankings from AP Poll

The 2013 BYU Cougars football team represented Brigham Young University in the 2013 NCAA Division I FBS football season. The Cougars, led by head coach Bronco Mendenhall, played their home games at LaVell Edwards Stadium. This was the third year BYU competed as an independent. They finished the season 8–5. They were invited to the Fight Hunger Bowl where they lost to Washington, 31–16.

== Before the season ==
=== Coaching changes ===
After the 2012 Poinsettia Bowl, longtime assistant coach Lance Reynolds announced his retirement after 33 years of service at BYU (29 years as a coach and 4 years as a player). To fill the vacancy, BYU looked to an old face. Longtime assistant Robert Anae was brought back from the University of Arizona as the new offensive coordinator. In addition to his position as the offensive coordinator, Anae was given the responsibility of helping Bronco evaluate the entire offensive staff.

On January 8, Mark Weber left BYU for Utah State after six years with the Cougars. Weber was hired by the Aggies as the new assistant head coach and as the offensive line coach.

On Monday, January 14, Coach Mendenhall informed running backs coach and recruiting coordinator Joe DuPaix and tight ends coach Ben Cahoon that their contracts would not be renewed for the 2013 season. It was also revealed that Brandon Doman's status with the university was uncertain for 2013. BYU announced they had interviewed Max Hall, Paul Peterson (Sacramento State offensive coordinator), and Steve Clark (Southern Utah offensive coordinator) for the position of quarterback coach for the 2013 season.

On Tuesday, January 15, BYU announced that two coaches had been hired as part of the new offensive staff for the 2013 season. Garett Tujague was hired and Mark Atuaia was moved from the athletic director's office as the assistant to the AD over to the football coaching staff. BYU's official press release said that positions wouldn't be announced until the staff was finalized, but common rumors stated that Tujague would become the offensive lines coach and Atuaia would become the running backs coach.

On Wednesday, January 16, BYU announced that Aaron Roderick had been hired as an assistant coach on the offensive side at BYU. Roderick was to join the Cougars after 8 years of service at Utah, and it was believed that he would serve as the receivers coach. Less than 24 hours after accepting the position at BYU, Roderick changed his mind and decided to return to the Utes for the 2013 season.

The final coaching staff members were announced on Friday, February 15. Jason Beck was hired as the quarterback coach and Guy Holliday was hired as the wide receiver coach.

On February 28, Bronco Mendenhall announced that Nick Howell had been promoted to the defensive coordinator position, Robert Anae was assistant head coach, and Kelly Popinga would serve as special teams coordinator.

=== 2013 recruits ===
College recruiting (2013)
Name	Hometown	School	Height	Weight	Commit date
Chasen Andersen; LB	Logan, UT	Logan	6 ft 0 in (1.83 m)	218 lb (99 kg)	Jan 19, 2013
Chasen Andersen; LB	Recruit ratings: Scout: Rivals: (67)				
Josh Carter; OL	Tucson, AZ	Eastern Arizona College	6 ft 5 in (1.96 m)	290 lb (130 kg)	Feb 6, 2013
Josh Carter; OL	Recruit ratings: Scout: Rivals: (NR)				
Michael Davis; WR	Glendale, CA	Glendale	6 ft 2 in (1.88 m)	180 lb (82 kg)	Jul 28, 2012
Michael Davis; WR	Recruit ratings: Scout: Rivals: (NR)				
Tim Duran; OL	Puyallup, WA	Cabrillo College	6 ft 4 in (1.93 m)	290 lb (130 kg)	Feb 6, 2013
Tim Duran; OL	Recruit ratings: Scout: Rivals: (NR)				
Nathan DeBeikes; LB	Thousand Oaks, CA	Thousand Oaks	6 ft 2 in (1.88 m)	196 lb (89 kg)	May 31, 2012
Nathan DeBeikes; LB	Recruit ratings: Scout: Rivals: (69)				
Garrett England; DB	Salt Lake City, UT	Skyline	6 ft 4 in (1.93 m)	190 lb (86 kg)	Jul 1, 2012
Garrett England; DB	Recruit ratings: Scout: Rivals: (70)				
Edward Fusi; OL	Corona, CA	Mt. San Antonio College	6 ft 1 in (1.85 m)	285 lb (129 kg)	Feb 6, 2013
Edward Fusi; OL	Recruit ratings: Scout: Rivals: (NR)				
Rylee Gautavai; LB	Bountiful, UT	Bountiful	6 ft 1 in (1.85 m)	200 lb (91 kg)	Nov 19, 2012
Rylee Gautavai; LB	Recruit ratings: Scout: Rivals: (68)				
Billy Green; QB	Woodway, WA	King's	6 ft 2 in (1.88 m)	196 lb (89 kg)	June 25, 2012 (Mid-year enrollee)
Billy Green; QB	Recruit ratings: Scout: Rivals: (74)				
Keegan Hicks; OL	South Jordan, UT	Bingham	6 ft 3 in (1.91 m)	285 lb (129 kg)	Jul 7, 2012
Keegan Hicks; OL	Recruit ratings: Scout: Rivals: (69)				
Brayden Kearsley; OL	Aloha, OR	Aloha	6 ft 5 in (1.96 m)	298 lb (135 kg)	Sep 15, 2011
Brayden Kearsley; OL	Recruit ratings: Scout: Rivals: (80)				
Moroni Laulu-Pututau; TE	Hyrum, UT	Mountain Crest	6 ft 4 in (1.93 m)	190 lb (86 kg)	Dec 2, 2011
Moroni Laulu-Pututau; TE	Recruit ratings: Scout: Rivals: (NR)				
Dallin Leavitt; DB	Portland, OR	Central Catholic	6 ft 0 in (1.83 m)	205 lb (93 kg)	Sep 20, 2011
Dallin Leavitt; DB	Recruit ratings: Scout: Rivals: (75)				
Sam Lee; DB	Brandywine, MD	College of the Canyons	6 ft 0 in (1.83 m)	180 lb (82 kg)	Dec 8, 2012
Sam Lee; DB	Recruit ratings: Scout: Rivals: (NR)				
Kai Nacua; LB	Henderson, NV	Liberty	6 ft 2 in (1.88 m)	205 lb (93 kg)	Jun 26, 2012
Kai Nacua; LB	Recruit ratings: Scout: Rivals: (69)				
JonRyheem Peoples; DL	Rigby, ID	Rigby	6 ft 6 in (1.98 m)	298 lb (135 kg)	Jun 13, 2012
JonRyheem Peoples; DL	Recruit ratings: Scout: Rivals: (NR)				
Trajan Pili; LB	Las Vegas, NV	Centennial	6 ft 2 in (1.88 m)	225 lb (102 kg)	Nov 4, 2011
Trajan Pili; LB	Recruit ratings: Scout: Rivals: (73)				
Addison Pulsipher; OL	Temecula, CA	Temecula Valley	6 ft 6 in (1.98 m)	260 lb (120 kg)	Jun 21, 2012
Addison Pulsipher; OL	Recruit ratings: Scout: Rivals: (70)				
Thomas Shoaf; OL	Columbus, IN	Columbus North	6 ft 6 in (1.98 m)	265 lb (120 kg)	Jul 23, 2012
Thomas Shoaf; OL	Recruit ratings: Scout: Rivals: (68)				
Talon Shumway; WR	Highland, UT	Lone Peak	6 ft 3 in (1.91 m)	200 lb (91 kg)	May 14, 2012
Talon Shumway; WR	Recruit ratings: Scout: Rivals: (76)				
Merrill Taliauli; DL	Salt Lake City, UT	East	6 ft 2 in (1.88 m)	305 lb (138 kg)	Jun 19, 2012
Merrill Taliauli; DL	Recruit ratings: Scout: Rivals: (74)				
Kuj (Johnny) Tapusoa; DB	Laie, HI	Kahuku	5 ft 10 in (1.78 m)	195 lb (88 kg)	Jun 22, 2012
Kuj (Johnny) Tapusoa; DB	Recruit ratings: Scout: Rivals: (75)				
Trenton Trammell; DB	Oakland, CA	City College of San Francisco	6 ft 0 in (1.83 m)	190 lb (86 kg)	October 22, 2012 (Mid-year enrollee)
Trenton Trammell; DB	Recruit ratings: Scout: Rivals: (74)				
Kalolu Utu; DL	Upolu Samoa	Compton Community College	6 ft 2 in (1.88 m)	285 lb (129 kg)	Feb 6, 2013
Kalolu Utu; DL	Recruit ratings: Scout: Rivals: (NR)				
De'Ondre Wesley; OL	Pleasant Hill, CA	Diablo Valley College	6 ft 6 in (1.98 m)	310 lb (140 kg)	Feb 3, 2013
De'Ondre Wesley; OL	Recruit ratings: Scout: Rivals: (78)				
Overall recruit ranking: Scout: 57 Rivals: 69 ESPN: Not Ranked Top 25
Note: In many cases, Scout, Rivals, 247Sports, On3, and ESPN may conflict in their listings of height and weight.; In these cases, the average was taken. ESPN grades are on a 100-point scale.; Sources: "BYU 2013 Football Commitments". Rivals.; "2013 BYU Football Commits". Scout.; "2013 Player Commits". ESPN.; "Scout.com Team Recruiting Rankings". Scout.; "2013 Team Ranking". Rivals.com.

DeBeikes, England, Laulu-Pututau, Shumway, and Tapusoa served church missions right after graduation and did not join the BYU team until the 2015 season.

=== 2013 returning missionaries ===
Eight return missionaries, 4 on the offensive side and 4 on the defensive side, returned and played their first action with BYU during the 2013 season.

College recruiting (2010)
Name	Hometown	School	Height	Weight	Commit date
Algie Brown; RB	Salt Lake City, UT	Skyline	6 ft 1 in (1.85 m)	208 lb (94 kg)	Oct 9, 2008
Algie Brown; RB	Recruit ratings: Scout: Rivals: (72)				
AJ Moore; RB	Murrieta, CA	Murrieta Valley	5 ft 11 in (1.80 m)	190 lb (86 kg)	May 20, 2009
AJ Moore; RB	Recruit ratings: Scout: Rivals: (78)				
Bryan Sampson; WR	Pleasant Grove, UT	Pleasant Grove	6 ft 5 in (1.96 m)	210 lb (95 kg)	Jun 21, 2009
Bryan Sampson; WR	Recruit ratings: Scout: Rivals: (75)				
Jordan Black; OL	Sandy, UT	Alta	6 ft 7 in (2.01 m)	240 lb (110 kg)	Mar 30, 2009
Jordan Black; OL	Recruit ratings: Scout: Rivals: (77)				
Sae Tautu; DL	Highland, UT	Lone Peak	6 ft 3 in (1.91 m)	223 lb (101 kg)	Oct 1, 2010
Sae Tautu; DL	Recruit ratings: Scout: Rivals: (NR)				
Tuni Kanuch; DL	South Jordan, UT	Bingham	6 ft 2 in (1.88 m)	290 lb (130 kg)	May 20, 2009
Tuni Kanuch; DL	Recruit ratings: Scout: Rivals: (75)				
Toha'i Ho Ching; LB	Sandy, UT	Alta	6 ft 1 in (1.85 m)	225 lb (102 kg)	Dec 8, 2009
Toha'i Ho Ching; LB	Recruit ratings: Scout: Rivals: (77)				
Joey Owens; LB	Pleasant Grove, UT	Pleasant Grove	6 ft 3 in (1.91 m)	215 lb (98 kg)	Jan 25, 2009
Joey Owens; LB	Recruit ratings: Scout: Rivals: (75)				
Overall recruit ranking: Scout: 22 Rivals: 40 ESPN: Not Ranked Top 25
Note: In many cases, Scout, Rivals, 247Sports, On3, and ESPN may conflict in their listings of height and weight.; In these cases, the average was taken. ESPN grades are on a 100-point scale.; Sources: "BYU 2010 Football Commitments". Rivals.; "2010 BYU Football Commits". Scout.; "2010 Player Commits". ESPN.; "Scout.com Team Recruiting Rankings". Scout.; "2010 Team Ranking". Rivals.com.

=== 2013 departures ===
The following Cougars graduated, transferred, or chose to serve two-year church missions after the 2012 season and didn't return to the team in 2013.

Name	Number	Pos.	Height	Weight	Year	Hometown	Notes
James Lark	7	QB	6'2"	200	Senior	St. George, UT	Graduated
Riley Nelson	13	QB	6'0"	199	RS Senior	Logan, UT	Graduated
Ezekiel Ansah	47	LB	6'6"	280	Senior	Accra, Ghana	Graduated; 1st Round, 5th pick by Detroit Lions
Braden Brown	75	OL	6'6"	300	RS Senior	Salt Lake City, UT	Graduated; NFL Free Agent Signee with St. Louis Rams
Ryan Freeman	50	OL	6'3"	287	RS Senior	Orem, UT	Graduated
David Foote	27	RB	5'11"	200	Senior	St. George, UT	Graduated
Zed Mendenhall	35	RB	5'11"	253	Senior	Alpine, UT	Graduated
Braden Hansen	76	OL	6'6"	307	Senior	Sandy, UT	Graduated; NFL Free Agent Signee with Oakland Raiders
Walter Kahaiali'i	71	OL	6'3"	325	Senior	Lahaina, HI	Retired during 2012 due to knee surgery & Graduated
Robbie Buckner	26	DB	5'10"	176	RS Senior	Ashdown, AR	Graduated
DeQuan Everett	21	DB	6'3"	209	RS Senior	Long Beach, CA	Graduated
Mike Hague	32	DB	5'10"	190	RS Senior	Salt Lake City, UT	Graduated
Ian Dulan	39	DL	6'1"	271	RS Senior	Hilo, HI	Graduated
Romney Fuga	98	DL	6'2"	318	RS Senior	Huntington Beach, CA	Graduated; NFL Free Agent Signee with Denver Broncos
Russell Tialavea	52	DL	6'3"	265	RS Senior	Oceanside, CA	Graduated
Simote Vea	98	DL	5'11"	270	RS Senior	Hauʻula, HI	Graduated
Uona Kaveinga	4	LB	5'11"	233	RS Senior	Hawthorne, CA	Graduated; NFL Free Agent Signee with Denver Broncos
Preston Hadley	7	DB	6'0"	200	Senior	Pleasant Grove, UT	Graduated; Invited to attend Seattle Seahawks camp
Joe Sampson	1	DB	5'10"	203	Senior	Oakland, CA	Graduated
Eathyn Manumaleuna	55	DL	6'2"	288	Senior	Anchorage, AK	Graduated
Austen Jorgensen	34	LB	6'2"	229	Senior	Mt. Pleasant, UT	Graduated
Brandon Ogletree	44	LB	5'11"	228	Senior	McKinney, TX	Graduated; NFL Free Agent Signee with Miami Dolphins
Reed Hornung	96	DS	6'2"	249	Senior	Anoka, MN	Graduated
Riley Stephenson	99	K & P	6'0"	205	Senior	St. George, UT	Graduated
Houston Reynolds	78	OL	6'2"	205	Junior	Provo, UT	Retired for medical reasons
Jordan Smith	23	WR	6'4"	203	Junior	Salem, UT	Not medically cleared to play, won't return for senior season
Kevan Bills	46	LB	6'3"	245	Sophomore	Provo, UT	Tore Achilles tendon, will medical redshirt 2013 season
Roman Andrus	62	DL	6'4"	259	Freshman	El Dorado Hills, CA	LDS mission (returning in 2015)
Tyson Brook	57	DL	6'1"	265	Freshman	Connell, WA	LDS mission (returning in 2015)
Nate Sampson	48	LB	6'0"	220	Freshman	Pleasant Grove, UT	LDS mission (returning in 2015)
Butch Pau'u	38	LB	6'0"	211	Freshman	Anaheim, CA	LDS mission (returning in 2015)
Rhett Sandlin	43	LB	6'2"	214	Freshman	Sandy, UT	LDS mission (returning in 2015)
Lene Lesatele	51	LB	6'1"	238	Freshman	Artesia, CA	LDS mission (returning in 2015)
Matt Hadley	17	DB	6'0"	191	Freshman	Connell, WA	LDS mission (returning in 2015)
Micah Hannemann	24	DB	6'0"	185	Freshman	Alpine, UT	LDS mission (returning in 2015)
Connor Noe	38	DB	6'2"	195	Freshman	Mason, OH	LDS mission (returning in 2015)
Sawyer Powell	28	DB	6'1"	201	Freshman	West Richland, WA	LDS mission (returning in 2015)
Morgan Unga	18	DB	6'4"	182	Freshman	Ogden, UT	LDS mission (returning in 2015)
Quin Ficklin	64	OL	6'3"	242	Freshman	Mesa, AZ	LDS mission (returning in 2015)
Austin Hoyt	66	OL	6'7"	248	Freshman	Ione, CA	LDS mission (returning in 2015)
Ryan Jensen	XX	OL	6'3"	220	Freshman	Alta, UT	LDS mission (returning in 2015)
Trevor Brown	93	TE	6'5"	210	Freshman	Provo, UT	LDS mission (returning in 2015)
Brayden El-Bakri	24	RB	6'0"	215	Freshman	Salt Lake City, UT	LDS mission (returning in 2015)
Bryan Engstrom	34	RB	5'8"	168	Freshman	Sandy, UT	LDS mission (returning in 2015)
Daniel Lacey	32	RB	6'1"	180	Freshman	Farmington, UT	LDS mission (returning in 2015)
Alex Kuresa	15	WR	5'11"	180	Freshman	Millville, UT	LDS mission (returning in 2015)
Dylan Collie	9	WR	5'10"	173	Freshman	El Dorado Hills, CA	LDS mission (returning in 2015)
Taggart Krueger	87	WR	6'2"	185	Freshman	Sammamish, WA	LDS mission (returning in 2015)

=== Spring Game ===
The annual Spring Game was held on Saturday, March 30, 2013. Instead of doing a traditional 20-minute scrimmage with 5 minutes per quarter, the Cougars held a 50-play scrimmage that became more of a 75-play scrimmage. More than 12,000 fans turned out to see the first team offense and second team defense (titled BYU West) take on the second team offense and first team defense (BYU East). Several expected starters, including QB Taysom Hill, who had not been cleared for full contact, were held out of the scrimmage. The offense scored four touchdowns and added one field goal in a 15–13 victory by the West team.

=== Pre-season honors ===
Name	Number	Pos.	Height	Weight	Year	Hometown	Notes
Kyle Van Noy	3	LB	6'3"	235	Senior	Reno, NV	Walter Camp POY Watch List, Butkus Award Watch List, Rotari Lombardi Watch List, Bronko Nagurski Trophy Watch List, Bednarik Award Watch List, Lott Trophy Watch List, Maxwell Award Watch List, Preseason All-America Candidate, Preseason Phil Steele 1st Team, Preseason USA Today All American
Cody Hoffman	2	WR	6'4"	210	Senior	Crescent City, CA	Bilentnikoff Award Watch List, Preseason All-America Candidate, Preseason Phil Steele 2nd Team
Michael Alisa	42	RB	6'1"	220	Senior	Laie, HI	Doak Walker Award Watch List
Jamaal Williams	21	RB	6'0"	200	Sophomore	Fontana, CA	Doak Walker Award Watch List
Spencer Hadley	2	LB	6'1"	227	Senior	Connell, WA	Butkus Award Watch List
Uani Unga	41	LB	6'1"	233	Senior	Rancho Cucamonga, CA	Butkus Award Watch List
Eathyn Manumaleuna	55	DL	6'2"	305	Senior	Anchorage, AK	Outland Trophy Watch List
Kaneakua Friel	82	TE	6'5"	261	Senior	Kaneohe, HI	DJohn Mackey Award Watch List
JD Falslev	12	RB	5'8"	175	Senior	Smithfield, UT	Paul Hornung Award Watch List
Bronson Kaufusi	90	DL	6'7"	282	Sophomore	Provo, UT	Hendrick Award Watch List
Ross Apo	1	WR	6'3"	207	Junior	Arlington, TX	Earl Campbell Award Watch List

== Media ==
=== 2013 Media Day ===
Football Media Day was held on Wednesday, June 26, at 10 a.m. MDT. BYU announced a 2-for-1 series with USC scheduled to begin in 2019, a 2015 affiliation with the Poinsettia Bowl, and the 3-year extension of head coach Bronco Mendenhall, pushing his contract through the 2016 season. New BYUtv Sports reporter Spencer Linton conducted webchats with some of BYU's returning starters, new starters, and head coaches. Trevor Matich returned from ESPN to act as a special analyst alongside BYUtv analysts Blaine Fowler, Jan Jorgensen, and Brian Logan. A TV special titled LaVell Edwards and the BYU Quarterback Factory was also held. Dave McCann acted as the panel host alongside LaVell Edwards, Robbie Bosco, Ty Detmer, Gifford Nielsen, Steve Sarkisian, Gary Sheide, Marc Wilson, Steve Young, Jim McMahon, and others.

=== Cougar IMG Sports Network affiliates ===
KSL 102.7 FM and 1160 AM- Flagship Station (Salt Lake City/ Provo, UT and ksl.com)
BYU Radio- Nationwide (Dish Network 980, Sirius XM 143, and byuradio.org)
KIDO- Boise, ID [football only]
KTHK- Blackfoot/ Idaho Falls/ Pocatello/ Rexburg, ID
KMGR- Manti, UT
KSUB- Cedar City, UT
KDXU- St. George, UT
KSHP- Las Vegas, NV [football only]

== Roster ==
2013 BYU Cougars football team roster
Players
Coaches
Offense

Pos.	#	Name	Class
QB	10	Billy Green	Fr
RB	31	Benson Manwaring	Fr
QB	4	Taysom Hill	So
QB	11	Jason Munns	Sr
QB	15	Ammon Olsen	So
QB	7	Christian Stewart	Jr
RB	42	Michael Alisa (injured)	Sr
RB	24	Algie Brown	Fr
RB	26	Nate Carter	So
RB	28	Adam Hine	So
RB	33	Paul Lasike	Jr
RB	34	AJ Moore	Fr
RB	5	Iona Pritchard	Jr
RB	21	Jamaal Williams	So
TE	82	Kaneakua Friel	Sr
TE	89	Terenn Houk	So
TE	84	Devin Mahina	Jr
TE	83	Stehly Reden	So
TE	85	Bryan Sampson	Fr
TE	19	Brett Thompson	Jr
TE	18	Richard Wilson	Sr
WR	1	Ross Apo	Jr
WR	12	JD Falslev (C)	Sr
WR	89	Travis Frey	Fr
WR	13	Kurt Henderson	So
WR	2	Cody Hoffman	Sr
WR	80	Marcus Mathews	Jr
WR	10	Mitch Mathews	So
WR	25	Luke Nelson	Fr
WR	3	Colby Pearson	Fr
WR	17	Skyler Ridley (C)	Sr
WR	6	Eric Thornton	So
OL	70	Terrance Alletto	So
OL	66	Josh Carter	Jr
OL	68	Andrew Crawford	So
OL	52	Tui Crichton	So
OL	54	Parker Dawe	Fr
OL	69	Tim Duran	Jr
OL	50	Edward Fusi	Jr
OL	67	Kyle Johnson	Fr
OL	65	Cole Jones	Fr
OL	73	Solomone Kafu	Jr
OL	55	Brayden Kearsley	Fr
OL	61	Quinn Lawlor	Jr
OL	72	Ryker Mathews	So
OL	71	Addison Pulsipher	Fr
OL	56	Thomas Shoaf	Fr
OL	74	Brock Stringham	Jr
OL	79	Manaaki Vaitai	Sr
OL	57	De'Ondre Wesley	Jr
OL	75	Brad Wilcox	Fr
OL	77	Michael Yeck	Jr

Defense

Pos.	#	Name	Class
DB	23	Trevor Bateman	So
DB	10	Khalil Bell	Fr
DB	20	Craig Bills	Jr
DB	4	Robertson Daniel	Jr
DB	15	Michael Davis	Fr
DB	18	DJ Doman	Fr
DB	32	Mike Hague	Sr
DB	16	Adam Hogan	Sr
DB	6	Jordan Johnson	Jr
DB	12	Mitchell Juergens	Fr
DB	11	Dallin Leavitt	Fr
DB	1	Sam Lee	Jr
DB	33	Scott Lefrandt	Sr
DB	13	Jonny Linehan	Fr
DB	27	Blake Morgan	Sr
DB	23	Kai Nacua	Fr
DB	7	Skye PoVey	Jr
DB	29	Jordan Preator	Fr
DB	36	Drew Reilly	So
DB	9	Daniel Sorensen (C)	Sr
DB	1	Trent Trammell	Jr
DB	30	Michael Wadsworth	So
DB	21	Jake Ziolkowski	Fr
DL	93	Michael Doman	So
DL	88	Austin Holt	Jr
DL	99	Marques Johnson	Jr
DL	78	Tuni Kanuch	Fr
DL	90	Bronson Kaufusi	So
DL	97	Theodore King	Fr
DL	48	Tomasi Laulile	Fr
DL	55	Eathyn Manumaleuna	Sr
DL	44	Remington Peck	So
DL	94	JonRyheem Peoples	Fr
DL	95	Logan Taele	So
DL	54	Merrill Taliauli	Fr
DL	56	Kalolo Utu	Jr
LB	45	Tyler Beck	Sr
LB	53	Tanner Cox	Jr
LB	49	Jordan Egbert	Fr
LB	5	Alani Fua	Jr
LB	46	Rylee Gautavai	Fr
LB	2	Spencer Hadley (S)	Sr
LB	38	Porter Hansen	Fr
LB	98	Toloa'i Ho Ching	Fr
LB	34	Austin Jorgensen	Sr
LB	25	Teu Kautai	So
LB	43	Jherremya Leuta-Douyere	So
LB	35	Joey Owens	Fr
LB	22	Manoa Pikula	So
LB	42	Trajan Pili	Fr
LB	47	Seth Probert	Jr
LB	39	Matthew Relei	Fr
LB)	31	Sae Tautu	Fr
LB	41	Uani Unga (C)	Sr
LB	3	Kyle Van Noy	Sr

Special teams

Pos.	#	Name	Class
P	26	Scott Arellano	Jr
P	28	Jordan Miller	So
K	38	Vance Bingham	Fr
K	27	Trevor Samson	Jr
K	37	Justin Sorensen	Sr
DS	96	Kevin O'Mary	Sr

Head coach

- Bronco Mendenhall (Oregon State)

Coordinators/assistant coaches

- Robert Anae (BYU)
  Offensive Coordinator, offensive line, assistant head coach
- Mark Atuaia (BYU)
  Running backs
- Garett Tujague (BYU)
  Offensive line
- Jason Beck (BYU)
  Quarterbacks
- Guy Holliday (Cheyney)
  Outside wide receivers
- Andrew George (BYU)
  Offensive graduate assistant focusing on tight ends, Y receiver, inside wide receivers
- Nick Howell (Weber State)
  Secondary, defensive coorindator
- Steve Kaufusi (BYU)
  Defensive line
- Kelly Poppinga (BYU)
  Outside linebackers, special teams
- Paul Tidwell (Utah State)
  Inside linebackers
- Jay Omer (Auburn)
  Strength & conditioning
- Duane Busby (Arizona State)
  Director of football operations
- Patrick Hickman (Boise State)
  Football H. S. relations coordinator
- Geoff Martzen (Fresno State)
  Football player personnel & on-campus recruiting coordinator

Legend

- (C) Team captain
- (S) Suspended
- (I) Ineligible
- Injured
- Redshirt

Roster

== Schedule ==
BYU faced schools from every BCS conference except the SEC: the ACC, Big Ten, Big 12, Pac-12, and the AAC. Notre Dame was an additional Top 25 opponent, and BYU also played rivalry games against Boise State and traditional rival Utah State. BYU played in the 2013 Fight Hunger Bowl.

Date	Time	Opponent	Site	TV	Result	Attendance
August 31	1:30 p.m.	at Virginia	Scott Stadium; Charlottesville, VA	ESPNU	L 16–19	53,310
September 7	5:00 p.m.	No. 15 Texas	LaVell Edwards Stadium; Provo, UT	ESPN2	W 40–21	63,197
September 21	8:15 p.m.	Utah	LaVell Edwards Stadium; Provo, UT (Holy War & Beehive Boot)	ESPN2	L 13–20	63,470
September 27	7:00 p.m.	Middle Tennessee	LaVell Edwards Stadium; Provo, UT	ESPNU	W 37–10	58,763
October 4	6:00 p.m.	at Utah State	Romney Stadium; Logan, UT (Beehive Boot & The Old Wagon Wheel)	CBSSN	W 31–14	25,513
October 12	5:00 p.m.	Georgia Tech	LaVell Edwards Stadium; Provo, UT	ESPNU	W 38–20	60,320
October 19	1:30 p.m.	at Houston	Reliant Stadium; Houston, TX	ESPNews	W 47–46	33,115
October 25	6:00 p.m.	Boise State	LaVell Edwards Stadium; Provo, UT	ESPN	W 37–20	62,954
November 9	1:30 p.m.	at No. 21 Wisconsin	Camp Randall Stadium; Madison, WI	ESPN	L 17–27	80,191
November 16	1:00 p.m.	Idaho State	LaVell Edwards Stadium; Provo, UT (Senior Day)	BYUtv	W 59–13	58,645
November 23	1:30 p.m.	at Notre Dame	Notre Dame Stadium; Notre Dame, IN	NBC	L 13–23	80,795
November 30	1:00 p.m.	at Nevada	Mackay Stadium; Reno, NV	CBSSN	W 28–23	21,540
December 27	7:30 p.m.	vs. Washington	AT&T Park; San Francisco, CA (Fight Hunger Bowl)	ESPN	L 16–31	34,136
Rankings from AP Poll released prior to game; All times are in Mountain time

== Game summaries ==
=== Virginia ===
BYUtv Panel: Alema Harrington, Brian Logan, David Nixon, and Andy Boyce. Sideline Reporters: Dave McCann and Blaine Fowler

BYU at Virginia

Team	1	2	3	4	Total
Cougars	0	7	0	9	16
• Cavaliers	0	3	9	7	19

- Date: August 31
- Location: Scott Stadium
  Charlottesville, VA
- Game start: 3:33 p.m. EST
- Elapsed time: 3:14
- Game attendance: 53,310
- Game weather: 89 °F (32 °C), Partly Cloudy, winds S at 8mph, 2 hour 9 minute weather delay (lightning), Rain (2nd Half)
- Referee: Reggie Smith
- TV announcers (ESPNU): Anish Shroff and Kelly Stouffer

BYU and Virginia entered into the game with both teams debuting new offenses and hoping for the best. Bad news occurred for Cougar fans before game time as it was revealed Cody Hoffman had an ankle sprain and would be unable to play. The first quarter saw BYU's total yardage as nearly quadruple that of Virginia's, but neither team was able to score. As the two teams got ready to start the second quarter, lightning struck within 15 miles of the stadium. Both teams were sent to their locker rooms, and a two-hour lightning delay began.

The lightning also caused havoc with the TV arrangements. ESPNU had another game to start broadcasting at 7 p.m., but BYU at Virginia would only be in the second quarter. As a result, ESPN decided to move the entire nation, except for those in the states of Virginia and Utah, to the Washington State/ Auburn ESPNU game while the markets of Utah and Virginia would remain with the BYU/ Virginia game. The game would be made available on ESPN3 for the rest of the nation. However viewers on DirecTV and Dish Network had no choice but to move to the next game as they couldn't put in territorial restrictions. Dish Network was able to air the remainder of the game on Channel 147, an ESPN alternate station, but DirecTV fans were to go unhappy, unless they had internet access to ESPN3.

The Cougars were able to strike first in the second quarter, and it provided hope for the Cougars as the Cougars had only lost three times in the Bronco Mendenhall era when BYU scored first. However a 53-yard field goal and a blocked punt gave Virginia the momentum, and they never looked back.

Weather continued to cause problems for BYU and Virginia as the third quarter began. A heavy rain storm began, and while the degrees of heaviness would rotate throughout the remainder of the game, the rain would cause both teams to shift to a ground and pound attack strategy. Virginia would score 12 unanswered points, culminating in a great toe drag by Darius Jennings to give the Cavaliers the lead.

Despite the toe drag, it would be the Virginia defense that would save the day for the Cavaliers. On a 3rd and 7 Hill threw the ball to sophomore running back Jamaal Williams, but the slickness of the ball and the continual rain caused it to slip from his hands. The ball would land in the hands of Virginia safety Anthony Harris. After a quick lateral Williams was able to bring the Cavs down at BYU's 13 yard line, but one play later Virginia would score the game's final touchdown. The Cougars would complete a 50-yard pass on the last play of the game, but it was too little, too late.

Jamaal Williams led the Cougars with 33 carries for 144 yards. Taysom Hill carried the ball 11 times for 42 yards and a touchdown. He would also throw the ball 13 times for 175 yards and a touchdown.

BYU owned every statistical category with 187 yards rushing compared to Virginia's 109. They would also out pass Virginia 175 to 114. However Virginia's wise ball control (34:09 to BYU's 25:51) allowed them to control the clock for 3 out of 4 quarters, and in the end it was the ball control, special teams blunders, a safety, and an interception that gave the Cavaliers a narrow 19 to 16 win.

Despite the loss, BYU did manage to compile one award for the week.

- Scott Arellano

FBS Independent Special Teams Player of the Week

Scoring summary

Quarter	Time	Drive			Team	Scoring information	Score	
Quarter	Time	Plays	Yards	TOP	Team	Scoring information	BYU	Virginia
2	5:12	5	32	1:26	BYU	JD Falslev 4-yard touchdown reception from Taysom Hill, Justin Sorenson kick good	7	0
2	0:00	8	42	0:57	Virginia	53-yard field goal by Ian Frye	7	3
3	12:28	3	16	1:23	Virginia	Darius Jennings 11-yard touchdown reception from David Watford, Ian Frye kick good	7	10
3	2:38				Virginia	Taysom Hill fumble, recovered by Hill in end zone where he is downed for Virginia safety	7	12
4	6:26	11	92	2:17	BYU	Taysom Hill 1-yard touchdown run, 2-point pass incomplete	13	12
4	5:02	5	9	1:15	BYU	36-yard field goal by Justin Sorensen	16	12
4	2:36	1	13	0:05	Virginia	Kevin Parks 13-yard touchdown run, Ian Frye kick good	16	19
"TOP" = time of possession. For other American football terms, see Glossary of American football.							16	19

=== Texas ===
BYUtv Panel: Alema Harrington, Brian Logan, and David Nixon

Texas at BYU

Team	1	2	3	4	Total
Longhorns	7	7	7	0	21
• Cougars	10	17	13	0	40

- Date: September 7
- Location: LaVell Edwards Stadium
  Provo, UT
- Game start: 6:52 p.m. MST
- Elapsed time: 3:27
- Game attendance: 63,197
- Game weather: 63 °F (17 °C), Cloudy w/ Scattered Showers, winds variable, Game start delayed 1 hour, 46 minutes by lightning
- Referee: Randy Christal
- TV announcers (ESPN2/LHN/Sports USA/BYUtv): Joe Tessitore, Matt Millen, and Maria Taylor (ESPN2)
  Craig Way, Roger Wallace, Rod Babers, and Kaylee Hartung (LHN)
  John Ahlers, Gary Barnett, and Scott Garrard (Sports USA)
  Dave McCann, Blaine Fowler, Kathy Aiken, and Spencer Linton (BYUtv)

At first many fans thought the game would be a repeat of last week as a severe thunderstorm hit Provo at 4 p.m.. Kickoff was immediately postponed from 5:06 p.m. as a 55-minute warmup was still required for both teams. Some of the players were able to go to the fans and interact with them before heading back to the locker room during the delay, giving the fans additional motivation. Nearly an hour after the storm hit, a start time of 6:52 was announced, resulting in a 1-hour, 46 minute lightning delay. The rain would continue on and off throughout the rest of the game, but no one expected the performance BYU put up.

Sophomore Quarterback Taysom Hill found lane after lane and was able to dominate the Texas line, setting a BYU record with 15.2 yards per rush, but he wasn't alone. For the second consecutive game Jamaal Williams would go over the century mark, and Paul Lasike would also add 86 rushing yards. It was part of a record performance for BYU- 550 rushing yards, which also became the most rushing yardage Texas has ever given up. For individual totals Hill had 259 yards rushing, the second highest rushing total for a BYU QB, and Williams had 182 yards rushing. Hill's passing yardage was less than impressive (9–26 with 129 yards and 1 interception), but with the running lanes throughout BYU was able to dominate and shock the #15 ranked Longhorns.

After the game, BYU swept the FBS Independent Player of the Week Awards and won a lot of other national attention awards.

- Taysom Hill

Athlon Sports National Player of the Week
CBSSports.com Offensive Player of the Week
Davey O'Brien Quarterback of the Week Honorable Mention
FBS Offensive Independent Player of the Week
College Sports Madness Independent Offensive Player of the Week

- Justin Sorensen

FBS Independent Special Teams Player of the Week
College Football Performance Awards Honorable Mention Placekicker of the Week
Lou Groza Collegiate Place-Kicker Award Star of the Week

- Jamaal Williams

College Football Performance Awards Honorable Mention Running Back of the Week

- Alani Fua

FBS Independent Defensive Player of the Week
College Football Performance Awards Honorable Mention Linebacker of the Week

- Tostitos Fiesta Bowl National Team of the Week

Scoring summary

Quarter	Time	Drive			Team	Scoring information	Score	
Quarter	Time	Plays	Yards	TOP	Team	Scoring information	Texas	BYU
1	12:11	11	60	2:49	BYU	34-yard field goal by Justin Sorensen	0	3
1	3:21	2	63	0:41	Texas	Mike Davis 57-yard touchdown reception from David Ash, Anthony Fera kick good	7	3
1	2:17	3	76	0:58	BYU	Taysom Hill 68-yard touchdown run, Justin Sorensen kick good	7	10
2	10:29	9	76	3:17	Texas	Joe Bergeron 2-yard touchdown run, Anthony Fera kick good	14	10
2	7:48	10	75	2:41	BYU	Taysom Hill 20-yard touchdown run, Justin Sorensen kick good	14	17
2	5:00	9	59	2:26	BYU	Paul Lasike 10-yard touchdown run, Justin Sorensen kick good	14	24
2	0:04	8	77	2:52	BYU	32-yard field goal by Justin Sorensen	14	27
3	10:02	8	79	1:51	BYU	Taysom Hill 26-yard touchdown run, Justin Sorensen kick good	14	34
3	8:24	5	83	1:33	Texas	Mike Davis 23-yard touchdown reception from David Ash, Anthony Fera kick good	21	34
3	5:43	9	51	2:27	BYU	36-yard field goal by Justin Sorensen	21	37
3	1:31	7	73	2:29	BYU	24-yard field goal by Justin Sorensen	21	40
"TOP" = time of possession. For other American football terms, see Glossary of American football.							21	40

=== Utah ===
The week of the game, BYU linebacker Spencer Hadley was suspended 5 games for an honor code violation.

Utah at BYU

Team	1	2	3	4	Total
• Utes	3	10	0	7	20
Cougars	0	0	6	7	13

- Date: September 21
- Location: LaVell Edwards Stadium
  Provo, UT
- Game start: 8:21 p.m. MST
- Elapsed time: 3:26
- Game attendance: 63,470
- Game weather: 73 °F (23 °C), Cloudy, winds S at 12mph
- Referee: Jack Folliard
- TV announcers (ESPN2/BYUtv): Mark Jones, Brock Huard, and Lewis Johnson (ESPN2)
  Dave McCann, Blaine Fowler, Kathy Aiken, and Spencer Linton (BYUtv)

Scoring summary

Quarter	Time	Drive			Team	Scoring information	Score	
Quarter	Time	Plays	Yards	TOP	Team	Scoring information	Utah	BYU
1	1:30	6	77	2:38	Utah	36-yard field goal by Andy Phillips	3	0
2	8:05	9	64	3:23	Utah	32-yard field goal by Andy Phillips	6	0
2	1:17	3	75	1:22	Utah	Anthony Denham 1-yard touchdown reception from Travis Wilson, Andy Phillips kick good	13	0
3	11:39	9	68	3:16	BYU	32-yard field goal by Justin Sorensen	13	3
3	5:39	13	61	4:00	BYU	31-yard field goal by Justin Sorensen	13	6
4	12:44	12	79	4:15	Utah	Karl Williams 2-yard touchdown reception from Travis Wilson, Andy Phillips kick good	20	6
4	5:13	6	44	1:49	BYU	Michael Alisa 1-yard touchdown run, Justin Sorensen kick good	20	13
"TOP" = time of possession. For other American football terms, see Glossary of American football.							20	13

=== Middle Tennessee ===
Middle Tennessee at BYU

Team	1	2	3	4	Total
Blue Raiders	10	0	0	0	10
• Cougars	7	16	14	0	37

- Date: September 27
- Location: LaVell Edwards Stadium
  Provo, UT
- Game start: 7:02 p.m. MST
- Elapsed time: 3:13
- Game attendance: 58,763
- Game weather: 48 °F (9 °C), Partly Cloudy, winds S at 5mph
- Referee: Joe Pester
- TV announcers (ESPNU/BYUtv): Eamon McAnaney and Anthony Becht (ESPNU)
  Dave McCann, Blaine Fowler, Kathy Aiken, and Spencer Linton (BYUtv)

Coming into the game, it was bad news for BYU from the start.

Jammal Williams was out with a concussion
Cody Hoffman was suspended for 1 game for violating team rules
Michael Yeck was back starting at RG after an injury to Brock Stringhman during the week.

Scoring summary

Quarter	Time	Drive			Team	Scoring information	Score	
Quarter	Time	Plays	Yards	TOP	Team	Scoring information	Middle Tennessee	BYU
1	12:14	7	15	2:46	Middle Tennessee	42-yard field goal by Cody Clark	3	0
1	10:47	3	10	1:14	BYU	Taysom Hill 12-yard touchdown run, Justin Sorensen kick good	3	7
1	0:36	7	24	2:28	Middle Tennessee	Marcus Henry 16-yard touchdown reception from Logan Kilgore, Cody Clark kick good	10	7
2	12:36				BYU	Kyle Van Noy 2-yard safety	10	9
2	7:31	3	58	0:37	BYU	Taysom Hill 50-yard touchdown run, Justin Sorensen kick good	10	16
2	0:15	7	67	1:27	BYU	Michael Alisa 2-yard touchdown run, Justin Sorensen kick good	10	23
3	11:21	12	60	3:33	BYU	Michael Alisa 1-yard touchdown run, Justin Sorensen kick good	10	30
3	0:28				BYU	JD Falslev 71-yard punt return for a touchdown, Justin Sorensen kick good	10	37
"TOP" = time of possession. For other American football terms, see Glossary of American football.							10	37

=== Utah State ===
BYUtv Panel: Dave McCann, Alema Harrington, Brian Logan, and Blaine Fowler. Sideline Reporter: Spencer Linton

BYU at Utah State

Team	1	2	3	4	Total
• Cougars	10	7	14	0	31
Aggies	7	0	0	7	14

- Date: October 4
- Location: Romney Stadium
  Logan, UT
- Game start: 6:07 p.m. MST
- Elapsed time: 3:26
- Game attendance: 25,513
- Game weather: 48 °F (9 °C), Partly Cloudy, winds SW at 7mph
- Referee: Rick Loumiet
- TV announcers (CBSSN): Andrew Catalon, Aaron Taylor & Lauren Gardner

Scoring summary

Quarter	Time	Drive			Team	Scoring information	Score	
Quarter	Time	Plays	Yards	TOP	Team	Scoring information	BYU	Utah St
1	14:50				BYU	Interception returned 17 yards for touchdown by Kyle Van Noy, Justin Sorensen kick good	7	0
1	10:48	3	15	1:15	Utah State	Travis Van Leeuwen 7-yard touchdown reception from Chuckie Keeton, Nick Diaz kick good	7	7
1	7:04	14	67	3:44	BYU	27-yard field goal by Justin Sorensen	10	7
2	10:30	4	81	1:15	BYU	Mitch Mathews 30-yard touchdown reception from Taysom Hill, Justin Sorensen kick good	17	7
3	12:06	10	75	2:54	BYU	Mitch Mathews 6-yard touchdown reception from Taysom Hill, Riley Stephenson kick good	24	7
3	5:52	4	71	1:14	BYU	Mitch Mathews 43-yard touchdown reception from Taysom Hill, Riley Stephenson kick good	31	7
4	1:34	11	88	4:19	Utah State	Ronald Butler 8-yard touchdown reception from Craig Harrison, Nick Diaz kick good	31	14
"TOP" = time of possession. For other American football terms, see Glossary of American football.							31	14

=== Georgia Tech ===
Georgia Tech at BYU

Team	1	2	3	4	Total
Yellow Jackets	7	6	0	7	20
• Cougars	14	10	0	14	38

- Date: October 12
- Location: LaVell Edwards Stadium
  Provo, UT
- Game start: 5:02 p.m. MST
- Elapsed time: 3:20
- Game attendance: 60,320
- Game weather: 64 °F (18 °C), Partly Cloudy, Winds calm
- Referee: Riley Johnson
- TV announcers (ESPNU/BYUtv): Clay Matvick, Matt Stinchcomb, & Dawn Davenport (ESPNU)
  Dave McCann, Gary Sheide, Kathy Aiken, and Spencer Linton (BYUtv)

On Friday it was announced that Spencer Hadley's suspension had been reduced to 3-games, and that he would be eligible to play against the Yellow Jackets if the coach would put him in. The news was only a small spark for the Cougars as they headed into the game. Running back's Jamaal Williams and Algernon Brown would run for their first TD's of the season, and Taysom Hill showed his passing performance against the Aggies wasn't a fluke, hitting Cody Hoffman for a 45-yard touchdown on their first possession of the game. Hill would later add a rushing touchdown of his own. The Cougars got out to an early 24–10 lead on the Yellow Jackets, and that lead would not let up. Hadley would play the entire second half, getting some 3rd down conversion sacks and tackles that prevented the Yellow Jackets from rallying. In the end BYU's defense would hold their 12th straight opponent under 21-points, and the Cougars would pick up their 3rd consecutive win. Hill completed 19/27 for 244 yards and a touchdown. Williams carried the ball 17 times for 89 yards while Hill added 15 carried for 87 yards. Hoffman led the Cougars receiving with 99-yards, and Falslev joined him with 69-yards. The Cougars D would score a touchdown for the third-consecutive game.

Scoring summary

Quarter	Time	Drive			Team	Scoring information	Score	
Quarter	Time	Plays	Yards	TOP	Team	Scoring information	Georgia Tech	BYU
1	10:26	3	62	0:33	BYU	Cody Hoffman 45-yard touchdown reception from Taysom Hill, Justin Sorensen kick good	0	7
1	7:30	6	70	2:56	Georgia Tech	Vad Lee 2-yard touchdown run, Harrison Butcker kick good	7	7
1	5:47	6	61	1:37	BYU	Jamaal Williams 7-yard touchdown run, Justin Sorensen kick good	7	14
2	13:32	16	55	7:15	Georgia Tech	37-yard field goal by Harrison Butker	10	14
2	8:44	16	70	4:48	BYU	23-yard field goal by Justin Sorensen	10	17
2	4:53	8	55	2:25	BYU	Taysom Hill 1-yard touchdown run, Justin Sorensen kick good	10	24
2	0:59	11	48	3:54	Georgia Tech	44-yard field goal by Harrison Butker	13	24
4	11:01				BYU	Interception returned 51 yards for touchdown by Alani Fua, Justin Sorensen kick good	13	31
4	3:11	6	69	3:35	BYU	Algernon Brown 15-yard touchdown run, Justin Sorensen kick good	13	38
4	0:53	5	75	2:18	Georgia Tech	Deon Hill 5-yard touchdown reception from Justin Thomas, Harrison Butker kick good	20	38
"TOP" = time of possession. For other American football terms, see Glossary of American football.							20	38

=== Houston ===
BYU at Houston

Team	1	2	3	4	Total
• BYU Cougars	24	10	0	13	47
UH Cougars	21	17	2	6	46

- Date: October 19
- Location: Reliant Stadium
  Houston, TX
- Game start: 2:34 p.m. CST
- Elapsed time: 4:07
- Game attendance: 33,115
- Game weather: 72 °F (22 °C), Indoors
- Referee: Greg Burks
- TV announcers (ESPNews): Joe Davis & David Diaz-Infante

A high flying first half led to a number of new records for the BYU football team. The two sets of Cougars combined for 701 yards of offense and 72 points in the first half (456 for BYU, 245 for Houston). With his first reception of the game, Cody Hoffman became the all-time leading receiver in BYU history, surpassing TE Dennis Pitta. With his touchdown reception, Hoffman tied Austin Collie for the most touchdown receptions made by a receiver at BYU. Taysom Hill became the first person to rush for more than 100 yards against Houston this season. BYU ran a record 115 plays, tying the all-time number of plays run in a FBS game by one-team and shattering their previous record of 95-plays in a game. BYU also made 41-first downs in the game, a new mark for most first downs in a game, and the 76-yard touchdown pass to Daniel Spencer became the most yardage the Cougars have given up in a pass this season.

Scoring summary

Quarter	Time	Drive			Team	Scoring information	Score	
Quarter	Time	Plays	Yards	TOP	Team	Scoring information	BYU	Houston
1	14:05	3	41	0:39	BYU	Jamaal Williams 15-yard touchdown run, Justin Sorensen kick good	7	0
1	10:03	8	68	1:27	BYU	41-yard field goal by Justin Sorensen	10	0
1	9:47				Houston	Demarcus Ayers 95 yard kickoff return for a touchdown, Richie Leone kick good	10	7
1	8:10	7	75	1:37	BYU	Ross Apo 11-yard touchdown reception from Taysom Hill, Justin Sorensen kick good	17	7
1	7:02	3	75	1:08	Houston	Xavier Maxwell 69-yard touchdown reception from Greg Ward Jr., Richie Leone kick good	17	14
1	5:57				Houston	Interception returned 29 yards for touchdown by Derrick Mathews, Richie Leone kick good	17	21
1	3:13	9	75	2:44	BYU	Ross Apo 18-yard touchdown reception from Taysom Hill, Justin Sorensen kick good	24	21
2	11:11	9	61	2:44	Houston	29-yard field goal by Richie Leone	24	24
2	9:38	3	52	0:51	Houston	Deontay Greenbury 6-yard touchdown reception from John O'Korn, Richie Leone kick good	24	31
2	3:57	10	76	2:38	BYU	Jamaal Williams 1-yard touchdown run, Justin Sorensen kick good	31	31
2	1:31	9	75	2:26	Houston	Daniel Spencer 41-yard touchdown reception from John O'Korn, Richie Leone kick good	31	38
2	0:00	8	73	1:31	BYU	20-yard field goal by Justin Sorensen	34	38
3	1:38				Houston	Derrick Mathews 2-yard safety	34	40
4	12:57	9	97	2:17	BYU	Cody Hoffman 25-yard touchdown reception from Taysom Hill, Justin Sorensen kick good	41	40
4	5:20	7	84	1:16	Houston	Deontay Greenbury 10-yard touchdown reception from John O'Korn, 2-point pass incomplete	41	46
4	1:08	3	48	0:42	BYU	Skyler Ridley 11-yard touchdown reception from Taysom Hill, 2-point run failed	47	46
"TOP" = time of possession. For other American football terms, see Glossary of American football.							47	46

=== Boise State ===
Boise State at BYU

Team	1	2	3	4	Total
Broncos	0	3	10	7	20
• Cougars	7	17	10	3	37

- Date: October 25
- Location: LaVell Edwards Stadium
  Provo, UT
- Game start: 6:06 p.m. MST
- Elapsed time: 3:25
- Game attendance: 62,954
- Game weather: 63 °F (17 °C), Clear w/ a sunset, Winds S 5mph
- Referee: Reggie Smith
- TV announcers (ESPN/BYUtv): Carter Blackburn, Danny Kanell, and Allison Williams (ESPN)
  Dave McCann, Blaine Fowler, Kathy Aiken, and Spencer Linton (BYUtv)

Scoring summary

Quarter	Time	Drive			Team	Scoring information	Score	
Quarter	Time	Plays	Yards	TOP	Team	Scoring information	Boise St	BYU
1	6:46	8	84	1:48	BYU	Taysom Hill 20-yard touchdown run, Justin Sorensen kick good	0	7
2	14:55	14	56	5:06	BYU	28-yard field goal by Justin Sorensen	0	10
2	4:50	14	76	4:41	Boise St	33-yard field goal by Dan Goodale	3	10
2	3:45	4	77	0:59	BYU	Ross Apo 37-yard touchdown reception from Taysom Hill, Justin Sorensen kick good	3	17
2	0:44	6	47	1:41	BYU	Cody Hoffman 4-yard touchdown reception from Taysom Hill, Justin Sorensen kick good	3	24
3	10:50	6	63	2:10	Boise St	34-yard field goal by Dan Goodale	6	24
3	8:50	6	75	2:00	BYU	Mitch Mathews 40-yard touchdown reception from Taysom Hill, Justin Sorensen kick good	6	31
3	3:44	7	22	1:57	Boise St	Grant Hedrick 5-yard touchdown run, Dan Goodale kick good	13	31
3	1:09	4	14	0:51	BYU	34-yard field goal by Justin Sorensen	13	34
4	10:23	8	85	2:06	Boise St	Troy Ware 14-yard touchdown reception from Grant Hedrick, Dan Goodale kick good	20	34
4	7:09	9	47	3:00	BYU	41-yard field goal by Justin Sorensen	20	37
"TOP" = time of possession. For other American football terms, see Glossary of American football.							20	37

=== Wisconsin ===
BYU at Wisconsin

Team	1	2	3	4	Total
Cougars	3	0	7	7	17
• Badgers	7	10	3	7	27

- Date: November 9
- Location: Camp Randall Stadium
  Madison, WI
- Game start: 1:30 p.m. MST
- Elapsed time: 3:10
- Game attendance: 80,191
- Game weather: 51 °F (11 °C), Overcast, Wind: W 14mph
- Referee: Dave Witvoet
- TV announcers (ESPN): Bob Wischusen, Rod Gilmore & Quint Kessenich

Scoring summary

Quarter	Time	Drive			Team	Scoring information	Score	
Quarter	Time	Plays	Yards	TOP	Team	Scoring information	BYU	Wisconsin
1	10:20	11	76	4:40	Wisconsin	James White 4-yard touchdown run, Jack Russell kick good	0	7
1	2:40	13	67	3:14	BYU	31-yard field goal by Justin Sorensen	3	7
2	3:34	11	63	6:21	Wisconsin	38-yard field goal by Jack Russell	3	10
2	0:14	11	65	2:08	Wisconsin	James White 5-yard touchdown reception from Joel Stave, Jack Russell kick good	3	17
3	10:36	7	15	2:55	Wisconsin	26-yard field goal by Jack Russell	3	20
3	9:04	6	62	1:25	BYU	Cody Hoffman 34-yard touchdown reception from Taysom Hill, Justin Sorensen kick good	10	20
4	13:51	10	92	4:43	Wisconsin	James White 14-yard touchdown run, Jack Russell kick good	10	27
4	3:12	9	57	2:53	BYU	Cody Hoffman 5-yard touchdown reception from Taysom Hill, Justin Sorensen kick good	17	27
"TOP" = time of possession. For other American football terms, see Glossary of American football.							17	27

=== Idaho State ===
Idaho State at BYU

Team	1	2	3	4	Total
Bengals	3	0	7	3	13
• Cougars	14	35	10	0	59

- Date: November 16
- Location: LaVell Edwards Stadium
  Provo, UT
- Game start: 1:05 p.m. MST
- Elapsed time: 3:20
- Game attendance: 58,645
- Game weather: 36 °F (2 °C), Cloudy w/ Mixed Rain & Snow, Wind: S 2mph
- Referee: Rick Loumiet
- TV announcers (BYUtv): Dave McCann, Blaine Fowler, Kathy Aiken, and Spencer Linton

Scoring summary

Quarter	Time	Drive			Team	Scoring information	Score	
Quarter	Time	Plays	Yards	TOP	Team	Scoring information	Idaho St.	BYU
1	11:30	12	60	3:30	BYU	Jamaal Williams 2-yard touchdown run, Justin Sorensen kick good	0	7
1	8:00	11	50	2:56	Idaho St.	21-yard field goal by Brendon Garcia	3	7
1	7:00	4	79	0:56	BYU	Jamaal Williams 70-yard touchdown run, Justin Sorensen kick good	3	14
2	14:33	4	79	0:54	BYU	Skyler Ridley 36-yard touchdown reception from Taysom Hill, Justin Sorensen kick good	3	21
2	9:59	5	48	1:12	BYU	Jamaal Williams 15-yard touchdown run, Justin Sorensen kick good	3	28
2	9:07				BYU	Interception returned 12 yards for touchdown by Bronson Kaufusi, Justin Sorensen kick good	3	35
2	3:00	6	67	1:50	BYU	Richard Wilson 15-yard touchdown reception from Taysom Hill, Justin Sorensen kick good	3	42
2	0:17	4	58	0:43	BYU	Algernon Brown 23-yard touchdown run, Justin Sorensen kick good	3	49
3	14:01	1	64	0:13	BYU	Adam Hine 64-yard touchdown run, Justin Sorensen kick good	3	56
3	6:33	21	83	7:21	Idaho St.	Luke Austin 6-yard touchdown reception from Justin Arias, Brendon Garcia kick good	10	56
3	0:48	5	24	2:36	BYU	26-yard field goal by Justin Sorensen	10	59
4	8:00	11	78	3:11	Idaho St.	26-yard field goal by Brendon Garcia	13	59
"TOP" = time of possession. For other American football terms, see Glossary of American football.							13	59

=== Notre Dame ===
BYU at Notre Dame

Team	1	2	3	4	Total
Cougars	7	0	6	0	13
• Fighting Irish	14	3	3	3	23

- Date: November 23
- Location: Notre Dame Stadium
  Notre Dame, IN
- Game start: 3:42 p.m. EST
- Elapsed time: 3:11
- Game attendance: 80,795
- Game weather: 26 °F (−3 °C), Snow Flurries, Wind: NW 20mph
- Referee: Gary Patterson
- TV announcers (NBC): Dan Hicks, Mike Mayock, and Alex Flanagan

Scoring summary

Quarter	Time	Drive			Team	Scoring information	Score	
Quarter	Time	Plays	Yards	TOP	Team	Scoring information	BYU	Notre Dame
1	10:11	5	84	2:11	Notre Dame	DeVaris Daniels 61-yard touchdown reception from Tommy Rees, Kyle Brindza kick good	0	7
1	6:48	12	71	3:23	BYU	JD Falslev 7-yard touchdown reception from Taysom Hill, Justin Sorensen kick good	7	7
1	4:43	8	75	2:05	Notre Dame	Tarean Folston 2-yard touchdown run, Kyle Brindza kick good	7	14
2	7:35	14	60	5:57	Notre Dame	26-yard field goal by Kyle Brinzda	7	17
3	12:48	5	52	2:12	Notre Dame	26-yard field goal by Kyle Brinzda	7	20
3	8:20	13	80	4:28	BYU	31-yard field goal by Justin Sorensen	10	20
3	0:39	11	58	3:11	BYU	27-yard field goal by Justin Sorensen	13	20
4	6:53	7	25	3:34	Notre Dame	51-yard field goal by Kyle Brinzda	13	23
"TOP" = time of possession. For other American football terms, see Glossary of American football.							13	23

=== Nevada ===
BYU at Nevada

Team	1	2	3	4	Total
• Cougars	0	0	14	14	28
Wolf Pack	7	0	7	9	23

- Date: November 30
- Location: Mackay Stadium
  Reno, NV
- Game start: 12:11 p.m. PST
- Elapsed time: 3:14
- Game attendance: 21,540
- Game weather: 48 °F (9 °C), Sunny, winds calm
- Referee: Scott Novak
- TV announcers (CBSSN): Andrew Catalon, Randy Cross & Lauren Gardner

Scoring summary

Quarter	Time	Drive			Team	Scoring information	Score	
Quarter	Time	Plays	Yards	TOP	Team	Scoring information	BYU	UNR
1	12:10	9	66	2:50	Nevada	Kendall Brock 2-yard touchdown run, Brent Zuzo kick good	0	7
3	14:28	2	75	0:32	BYU	Jamaal Williams 66-yard touchdown run, Justin Sorensen kick good	7	7
3	9:34	11	75	4:54	Nevada	Cody Fajardo 3-yard touchdown run, Brent Zuzo kick good	7	14
3	6:07	9	80	3:22	BYU	Kanaeaku Friel 10-yard touchdown reception from Taysom Hill, Justin Sorensen kick good	14	14
4	14:50	13	59	4:07	BYU	JD Falslev 3-yard touchdown reception from Taysom Hill, Justin Sorensen kick good	21	14
4	9:02	13	70	5:48	Nevada	24-yard field goal by Brent Zuzo	21	17
4	6:40	8	75	2:18	BYU	Taysom Hill 35-yard touchdown run, Justin Sorensen kick good	28	17
4	2:42	11	67	3:58	Nevada	Brandon Wimberly 5-yard touchdown reception from Cody Fajardo, 2-point pass failed- intercepted by Kyle Van Noy	28	23
"TOP" = time of possession. For other American football terms, see Glossary of American football.							28	23

=== Fight Hunger Bowl ===
BYU vs. Washington

Team	1	2	3	4	Total
Cougars	0	16	0	0	16
• Huskies	7	14	7	3	31

- Date: December 27
- Location: AT&T Stadium
  San Francisco, CA
- Game start: 6:36 p.m. PST
- Elapsed time: 3:22
- Game attendance: 34,136
- Game weather: 56 °F (13 °C), Mostly cloudy, winds SW 4mph
- Referee: Clay Martin, (CUSA)
- TV announcers (ESPN/ESPN Radio): Dave Pasch, Brian Griese, Tom Luginbill (ESPN)
  Dave Flemming, Mike Bellotti, Shelley Smith (ESPN Radio)

Scoring summary

Quarter	Time	Drive			Team	Scoring information	Score	
Quarter	Time	Plays	Yards	TOP	Team	Scoring information	BYU	Washington
1	8:55	12	71	3:57	Washington	Bishop Sankey 11-yard touchdown run, Travis Coons kick good	0	7
2	12:10	12	88	4:14	BYU	Taysom Hill 1-yard touchdown run, Justin Sorensen kick good	7	7
2	11:57				Washington	John Ross 100 yard kickoff return for a touchdown, Travis Coon kick good	7	14
2	8:22	10	48	3:31	BYU	45-yard field goal by Justin Sorensen	10	14
2	3:46	11	51	3:12	BYU	31-yard field goal by Justin Sorensen	13	14
2	2:36	4	35	1:00	Washington	Bishop Sankey 11-yard touchdown run, Travis Coons kick good	13	21
2	0:00	12	61	2:36	BYU	32-yard field goal by Justin Sorensen	16	21
3	11:12	10	62	3:42	Washington	Jenkins Seferian 16-yard touchdown reception from Keith Price, Travis Coons kick good	16	28
4	7:53	9	39	3:43	Washington	45-yard field goal by Travis Coons	16	31
"TOP" = time of possession. For other American football terms, see Glossary of American football.							16	31
