= 2013 Fight Hunger Bowl =

BYU Cougars	Washington Huskies
(8–4)	(8–4)
Independent	Pac-12
16	31
Head coach: Bronco Mendenhall	Head coach: Marques Tuiasosopo, interim
	1	2	3	4	Total
BYU	0	16	0	0	16
Washington	7	14	7	3	31
- Date: December 27, 2013
- Season: 2013
- Stadium: AT&T Park
- Location: San Francisco, California
- MVP: Offense: Bishop Sankey Washington Running Back; Defense: Hau’oli Kikaha Washington Defensive End
- Favorite: Washington by 3
- Referee: Clay Martin (C-USA)
- Attendance: 34,136
- Payout: US$1,000,000 (Pac-12) $850,000 (BYU)

United States TV coverage
- Network: ESPN
- Announcers: Dave Pasch (play-by-play); Brian Griese (analyst); Tom Luginbill (sidelines)

The 2013 Fight Hunger Bowl is an American college football bowl game that was played on December 27, 2013, at AT&T Park in San Francisco, California. It was one of the 2013–14 bowl games that concluded the 2013 FBS football season. The 12th edition of the Fight Hunger Bowl, it featured the Washington Huskies, from the Pac-12 Conference, against the BYU Cougars, an independent team. The game began at 6:30 p.m. PST and aired on ESPN. It was the last Fight Hunger Bowl game played at AT&T Park.

Washington and BYU both finished the regular season with records of 8–4, and each team faced its own set of circumstances entering the game. Washington entered the game with quarterbacks coach Marques Tuiasosopo serving as its interim coach following the departure of Steve Sarkisian and several staff members to University of Southern California, where Sarkisian was named head coach days before the game. Though the Huskies moved quickly to hire Chris Petersen away from Boise State, Tuiasosopo coached the game. Washington featured a pair of key star players on offense, in Bishop Sankey at running back and Austin Seferian-Jenkins at tight end. Key performers on the defense included linebacker Shaq Thompson and team captain Sean Parker, a safety. BYU featured a high-powered offense that centered on dual-threat quarterback Taysom Hill and wide receiver Cody Hoffman. The offensive line, however, had been in shambles all season long, and was a potential area of concern. Defensively, Kyle Van Noy, an All-American who was one of the "best defenders" in program history, headlined a unit that also featured Uani 'Unga, who led the group in tackles.

The game featured two female officials, which made Football Bowl Subdivision (FBS) history. After Washington scored first, and was the only team to score in the first quarter, BYU came back in the second quarter with a trio of field goals from Justin Sorensen, but ultimately trailed at halftime following a kickoff returned for a touchdown and a touchdown pass to Seferian-Jenkins by Washington. The halftime score was 21–16, with Washington holding the 5-point advantage. They were the only team to score in the second half, posting 10 points despite losing both their quarterback and running back due to injury in the fourth quarter. Ultimately, they won the game 31–16.

== Teams ==
=== BYU Cougars ===
In December 2010, organizers announced that they had reached a deal with BYU to play in the 2013 edition of the Fight Hunger Bowl. The Cougars, who became conference independent during the 2011 season, were scheduled to fill a slot originally allotted to a team from the Western Athletic Conference, which discontinued football prior to the 2013 season. After defeating the Boise State Broncos for their sixth win of the season on October 25, bowl director Gary Cavalli extended an invitation to play in the game. Cavalli stated in 2010 that he had been hoping to secure the Cougars' participation in the game since 2002. If the Cougars did not earn enough wins to become bowl eligible, an alternate team from the Atlantic Coast Conference would have replaced them; though they finished bowl eligible, one ESPN writer opined they were even better than their record indicated.

==== Offense ====
Led by coordinator Robert Anae, the Cougars' offense led all seven Football Bowl Subdivision (FBS) independent teams in total offense, gaining 495.3 yards per game, they were second in scoring, averaging 31.3 points per game. Averaging 220.8 passing yards per game, BYU's passing game was led by 23-year-old sophomore quarterback Taysom Hill, who totaled 2,645 passing yards with 19 touchdowns (TDs) and 13 interceptions (INTs) on a total of 390 passing attempts, which was in the top-25 most passing attempts among NCAA quarterbacks. Hill also led the team in rushing attempts, yards, and touchdowns, with 215, 1211, and 9 respectively. Fellow sophomore Jamaal Williams, a running back, was a close second in each of the aforementioned categories, with 205, 1202, and 7 respectively. Other key contributors in the rushing attack included running backs Paul Lasike, a bruising 6 feet 0 inches (1.83 m) 227 pounds (103 kg) junior former rugby star, from New Zealand, who rushed for 341 yards and a touchdown on the season, Algernon Brown, a freshman who rushed for 234 yards and 2 touchdowns, and Adam Hine, a sophomore who rushed for 219 yards and a touchdown. NFL Draft prospect Cody Hoffman, rated the 22nd-best wide receiver prospect for 2014, led the receiving game from his 6 feet 4 inches (1.93 m) frame, catching 45 passes for 727 yards and 5 TDs. Supplementing Hoffman's leadership of the receiving game were fellow senior wide receiver Skyler Ridley (35 receptions, 412 yards, 2 TDs) and sophomore Mitch Mathews, who from his massive 6 feet 6 inches (1.98 m) stature reeled in 23 passes for 397 yards and 4 TDs. Other contributors included wide receivers JD Falslev and Ross Apo, and tight ends Brett Thompson and Kaneaku Friel.

A "work in progress" all season long, the BYU offensive line shuffled players in and out in various positions:

Head coach Bronco Mendenhall and offensive coordinator Robert Anae both say they’ve witnessed progress in recent weeks, but there have still been a lot of whiffs, missed assignments, questionable efforts, injuries, rotating lineups, challenges to compete, and advocacy to be more physical. When in pass pro – a formation with a loaded backfield to help pass block – backs are missing shuffle blocks and pickups. Offensive line coach Garett Tujague has navigated all this like Horatio Hornblower.

As evidenced by their depth chart, numerous players started all season long. In the final game against Notre Dame, junior Michael Yeck started at left tackle, fellow junior Solomone Kafu started at left guard, sophomore Terrance Alletto started at center, freshman Kyle Johnson started at right guard, and junior De'Ondre Wesley started at right tackle. Senior Justin Sorensen handled the kicking duties, and was accurate, making 81.8% of his field goal attempts and 100% of his extra point attempts, though did not have much range, with a long of 41 yards on the season.

==== Defense ====
The 3-4 defense was led by coordinator Nick Howell. Senior linebacker Uani 'Unga led the defense in tackles, recording 136 on the season, adding 7 tackles-for-loss (TFL), and 2 forced fumbles (FF). Joining him in the linebacking corps were All-American Kyle Van Noy, "perhaps the best defender to ever run out of the home-team tunnel at LaVell Edwards Stadium" and led the defense with 16 TFL, junior Alani Fua, who was third on the team with 63 tackles, senior Austin Jorgensen, whose career ended with surgery to repair torn knee cartilage in October, and Spencer Hadley, who returned late in the year after a suspension imposed due to an honor code violation. The defensive line was composed of sophomore defensive end Bronson Kaufusi, tied for second on the defense with seven TFL and tied for first with four sacks, senior nose tackle Eathyn Manumaleuna, an Alaskan who made 46 tackles and was a candidate to win the Outland Trophy, and sophomore defensive end Remington Peck, who recorded 4 TFL and 3 sacks to complement his 36 tackles and 2 fumble recoveries. Junior safety Craig Bills led the defensive backfield with 69 tackles, and tied with three others for the team lead in interceptions with two. Joining him in the secondary were fellow safety Daniel Sorensen, a senior who recorded 59 tackles and 4 TFL (as well as 2 interceptions), junior cornerback Daniel Robertson, who recorded 59 tackles as well as one each TFL, sack, and interception, and freshman cornerback Michael Davis, who in only eight games made 17 tackles. Junior Skye Povey, seniors Mike Hague and Blake Morgan, and sophomore Manoa Pikula also contributed to the defensive backfield, though did not start in the last game of the season.

=== Washington Huskies ===
Former Washington quarterback Marques Tuiasosopo, who during the season served as the team's quarterbacks coach, was named the Huskies' interim head coach after Steve Sarkisian left the team to return to the USC Trojans, where he previously served as offensive coordinator. The announcement came after Washington closed its regular season on a two-game winning streak including defeating arch-rival Washington State in the Apple Cup. Prior to that, they had lost four of their previous six games, including three losses to top-15 teams (#13 UCLA, #5 Stanford, #2 Oregon). They won their first four games of the season. In total, their record entering the bowl game was 8–4. Prior to the bowl game, it was announced that former Boise State head coach Chris Petersen, whom an associate athletic director characterized as a "dream hire", agreed to be Washington's next head coach, however he would not coach in the bowl game.

==== Offense ====
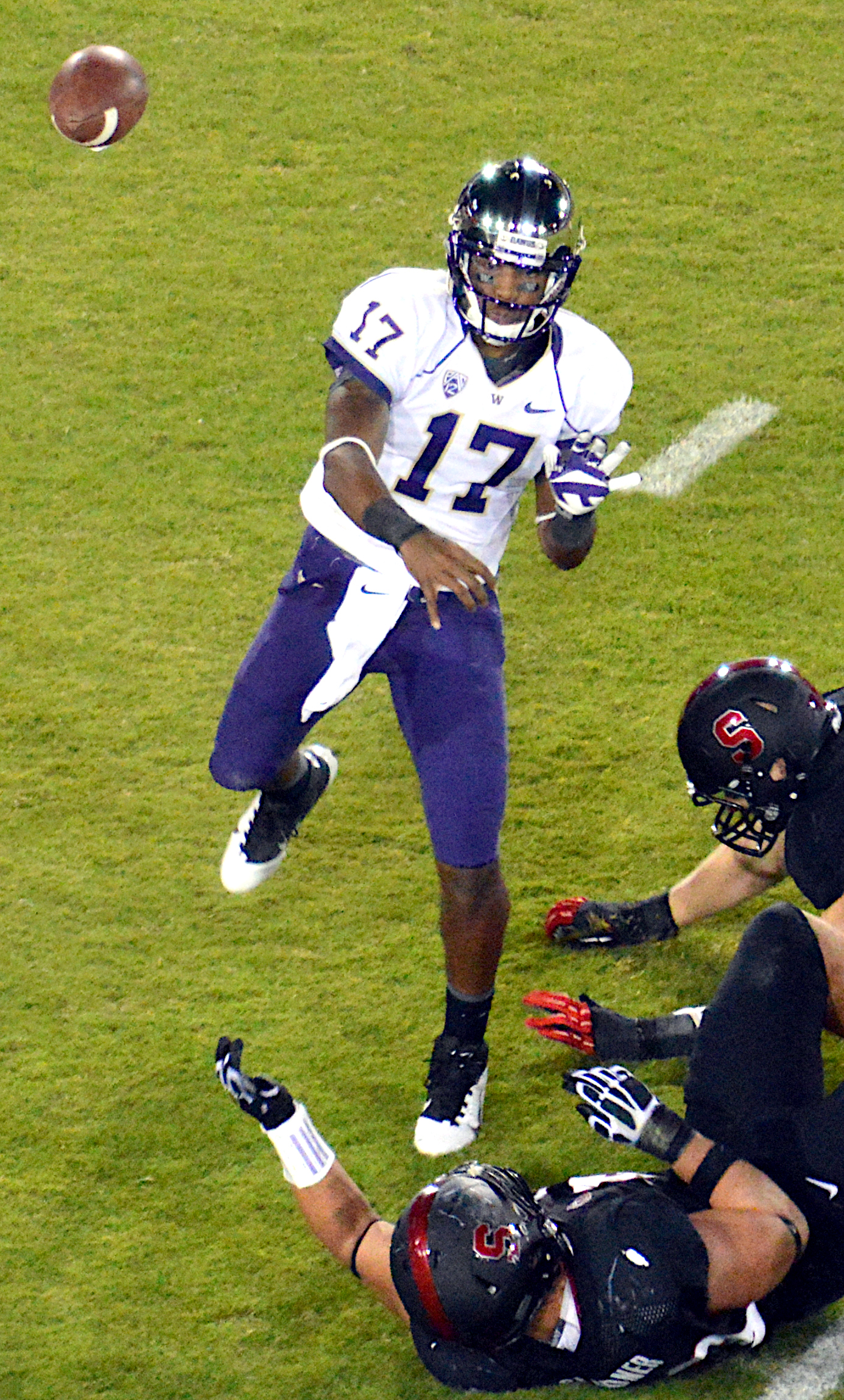
Keith Price throwing a pass in a game against Stanford

Coordinated during the season by Eric Kiesau, the Huskies offensive staff was shaken up after the departure of Sarkisian – Tuiasosopo, who during the season was quarterbacks coach, was promoted to interim head coach, and Johnny Nansen, who during the season was running backs coach and special teams coordinator, departed to USC with Sarkisian; all other coaches remained in the same capacity for the bowl game. On the field, senior quarterback Keith Price recorded 20 touchdown passes to just 5 interceptions, while passing for 2843 yards. Though the passing game was successful, the offense was anchored by a strong rushing game, whose 243.1 rushing yards per game was 14th in the country entering the game. That rushing game was led by Doak Walker Award finalist Bishop Sankey, who "exceeded the hype this year and has been a workhorse back"; he recorded 1775 rushing yards and 18 rushing touchdowns, as well as 25 receptions for 298 yards and another touchdown. Freshman Dwayne Washington, junior Deontae Cooper, and junior Jesse Callier, all running backs, also contributed to the rushing attack.

A trio of wideouts were the top three receivers – senior Kevin Smith, who emerged at the beginning of the season as a spark for the team's offense and totaled 45 receptions for 722 yards and 4 touchdowns, sophomore Jaydon Mickens, who recorded 62 receptions for 681 yards and 5 touchdowns, and junior Kasen Williams, who caught 29 receptions for 421 yards and a touchdown. Junior Austin Seferian-Jenkins, a 6 feet 6 inches (1.98 m) 276 pounds (125 kg) "tight end that plays like a wide receiver", regressed from his 2012 campaign in which he caught 69 passes, but still managed to reel in 33 passes for 413 yards and 7 touchdowns. Senior Travis Coons handled the kicking game, and made 58 of 59 extra point attempts, and 14 of 15 field goal attempts, with a long of 48 yards. The Huskies' offensive line was more stable than in 2012, as it returned all five starters, however they were not effective in 2012, but did improve in 2013. Sophomore left guard Dexter Charles, junior center Mike Criste, and left tackle Micah Hatchie each earned honorable mention all-Pac-12 honors.

==== Defense ====
Thrown into shambles by Sarkisian's departure, the Huskies' defensive staff still featured Justin Wilcox as defensive coordinator, despite his candidacy for various other coaching positions as well as to move with Sarkisian to USC, and Tosh Lupoi as defensive line coach, though like Wilcox, he was rumored to be heading with Sarkisian to USC, but had a large buyout in his contract, while secondary coach Keith Heyward and linebackers coach and recruiting coordinator Peter Sirmon both left for USC. the latter of whom "without a doubt" fostered strong play from linebackers. Senior linebacker Princeton Fuimaono led the defense with 76 tackles and 3 tackles for loss (TFL), while sophomore linebacker Shaq Thompson was a close second with 70 tackles, adding 4 TFL (he earned honorable mention All-Pac-12 honors), and junior linebacker John Timu rounded out the corps and finished third on the defense with 63 tackles and 2.5 TFL. Sophomore Travis Feeney also contributed. On the defensive line, Hawaiian end Hau'oli Kikaha was fourth on the defense with 61 tackles, and led the defense with 12.5 TFL and 10 sacks; he received second-team All-Pac-12 honors. Cory Littleton, a sophomore who was listed as a linebacker, started at defensive end and was sixth on the defense with 58 tackles, adding 9.5 TFL and 5 sacks. Danny Shelton, a 6 feet 1 inch (1.85 m) 327 pounds (148 kg) junior, started every game in the interior at nose tackle, and totaled 52 tackles, 3.5 TFL, and 2 sacks. The Huskies' defensive backfield featured two preeminent starters. At safety, two-time team captain senior Sean Parker, an honorable mention all-conference honoree, recorded 60 tackles, fifth on the team, 3.5 TFL, a sack, and was second on the defense with 4 interceptions. He was joined by fellow senior Will Shamburger, who totaled 47 tackles. At cornerback, sophomore Marcus Peters achieved second-team all-conference honors; he led the defense with 5 interceptions, also recording 53 tackles and deflecting 14 passes. Joining him at cornerback was senior Gregory Ducre, who started every game of the season.

== Game summary ==
=== First quarter ===
The game, which was the first FBS game to feature two female officials, commenced with BYU receiving the opening kickoff and, after running six plays that netted 21 yards, punting. After the punt, Washington (WASH) embarked on a 12-play, 71-yard drive that encapsulated 3:57, was highlighted by a 17-yard pass from Keith Price to Austin Seferian-Jenkins that converted a 3rd down and 16, and culminated with an 11-yard touchdown run by Bishop Sankey to open up a 7–0 advantage. After the teams' exchanged punts, BYU tried to convert a fourth down despite the fact that they were deep in their own territory, and ultimately turned the ball over on downs, only to have Washington subsequently do the same (turn the ball over on downs once again) while trying to convert a fourth down inside the 5-yard line. At the end of the first quarter, Washington retained their 7-point lead.

=== Second quarter ===
At the end of the first quarter, BYU started a drive that occurred predominantly in the second quarter, and came to fruition when Taysom Hill rushed for a 1-yard touchdown, which, after the extra point was made, tied the game at seven. The tie did not last long, however, as on the ensuing kickoff, WASH's John Ross returned BYU's Justin Sorensen's kickoff 100 yards for a touchdown, putting the Huskies back on top, 14–7. On BYU's ensuing drive, this time one that lasted 10 plays, netting 48 yards, Sorensen kicked a 45-yard field goal to pull the Cougars within four points. They had the ball again after a quick three-and-out by Washington, and once again ran more than 10 plays, this time running 11 for a total of 51 yards and another Sorensen field goal, this time a 31-yard kick. Hoping to avoid another long kickoff return, Sorensen's kickoff was a short one, but the plan backfired when Washington's Jesse Callier, typically a backup running back, returned the kickoff 47 yards, allowing the Huskies to start their drive at the BYU 35-yard line. Four plays later, Sankey rushed for his second 11-yard touchdown of the game, making the score 21–13. Subsequently, BYU executed 12 plays, en route to Sorensen kicking his third field goal of the quarter as the first half's time expired, thus making the halftime score 21–16.

=== Third quarter ===
WASH received the second half's opening kickoff, and Ross returned the kick to the 38-yard line, from which they began a 10-play, 62-yard drive that ended with a 16-yard touchdown pass from Price to Seferian-Jenkins that made the score 28–16. That was the only score of the quarter. After the drive, the teams exchanged punts twice before Price threw an interception to BYU's Robertson Daniel; BYU thus had the ball to start their drive at the Washington 26-yard line. They failed to gain any yardage, and settled for a Sorensen field goal attempt, but he missed the 44-yard try, giving the ball back to the Huskies, who failed to score, and punted back to BYU, who was amidst a drive at the conclusion of the third quarter.

=== Fourth quarter ===
BYU opened the final quarter of play by punting. After exchanging three-and-outs with BYU, Washington, who had backup quarterback Cyler Miles and Callier at running back in the game rather than Price and Sankey, who exited due to a rib injury and hand injury respectively, moved down the field in 9 plays totaling 39 yards, entering field goal range, and scoring when Travis Coons made a 45-yard field goal to put the Huskies on top by 15 with 7:53 to play. BYU turned the ball over on their next two possessions, the first time on downs, the second due to an interception (between the two, WASH punted), allowing WASH to nearly run out the clock at the end of the game, relinquishing the ball on downs back to BYU with 44 seconds left. The Cougars failed to score at the end of the game, and ultimately, Washington won 31–16.

=== Broadcast ===
ESPN broadcast the game to a national live viewing audience. Dave Pasch disseminated play-by-play, former quarterback Brian Griese handled analysis, and recruiting guru Tom Luginbill was the sideline reporter. ESPN Radio was the primary radio outlet through which the game was broadcast; the announcers on that platform were San Francisco Giants baseball announcer Dave Flemming, who did play-by-play commentary, former Oregon Ducks football coach Mike Bellotti, who was the game analyst, and long-time ESPN anchor and reporter Shelley Smith, who was the sideline reporter.

=== Scoring summary ===
Scoring summary

Quarter	Time	Drive			Team	Scoring information	Score	
Quarter	Time	Plays	Yards	TOP	Team	Scoring information	BYU	Washington
1	8:55	12	71	3:57	WASH	Bishop Sankey 11-yard touchdown run, Travis Coons kick good	0	7
2	12:10	12	88	4:14	BYU	Taysom Hill 1-yard touchdown run, Justin Sorensen kick good	7	7
2	11:57				WASH	Kickoff returned 100 yards for touchdown by John Ross, Coons kick good	7	14
2	8:22	10	48	3:31	BYU	45-yard field goal by Sorensen	10	14
2	3:46	11	51	3:12	BYU	31-yard field goal by Sorensen	13	14
2	2:36	4	35	1:00	WASH	Sankey 11-yard touchdown run, Coons kick good	13	21
2	0:00	12	61	2:36	BYU	32-yard field goal by Sorensen	16	21
3	11:12	10	62	3:42	WASH	Austin Seferian-Jenkins 16-yard touchdown reception from Keith Price, Coons kick good	16	28
4	7:53	9	39	3:43	WASH	45-yard field goal by Coons	16	31
"TOP" = time of possession. For other American football terms, see Glossary of American football.							16	31

=== Statistics ===
==== Team statistics ====
Statistics	BYU	Washington
First downs	28	19
Total offense, plays – yards	97–473	70–319
Rushes-yards (net)	180	190
Passing yards (net)	293	129
Passes, Comp-Att-Int	25–49–1	18–27–1
Time of Possession	32:02	27:58

==== Individual statistics ====
===== Passing =====
Team	Name	Completions	Attempts	Yards	Touchdowns	Interceptions
BYU	Taysom Hill	25	48	293	0	1
WASH	Keith Price	17	22	123	1	1
WASH	Cyler Miles	1	5	6	0	0

===== Rushing =====
Team	Name	Rushes	Yards	Touchdowns	Long	Avg.
BYU	Taysom Hill	31	133	1	19	4.3
BYU	Jamaal Williams	12	31	0	8	2.6
WASH	Bishop Sankey	21	95	2	17	4.5
WASH	Cyler Miles	2	30	0	32	15.0
WASH	Keith Price	7	30	0	20	4.3
WASH	Jesse Callier	12	24	0	9	2.0

===== Receiving =====
Team	Name	Receptions	Yards	Touchdowns	Long	Avg.
BYU	Cody Hoffman	12	167	0	23	13.9
BYU	Skyler Ridley	4	57	0	23	14.3
BYU	JD Falslev	4	33	0	16	8.3
BYU	Brett Thompson	3	21	0	10	7.0
BYU	Kurt Henderson	1	12	0	12	12.0
BYU	Paul Lasike	1	3	0	3	3.0
WASH	Kevin Smith	5	43	0	14	8.6
WASH	Damore'ea Stringfellow	4	36	0	15	9.0
WASH	Austin Seferian-Jenkins	3	37	1	17	12.3
WASH	Jaydon Mickens	3	7	0	5	2.3
WASH	Bishop Sankey	3	6	0	5	2.0

- All stats per Official Game Book via GoHuskies.com, Official Athletic Site of the Washington Huskies

== Postgame effects ==
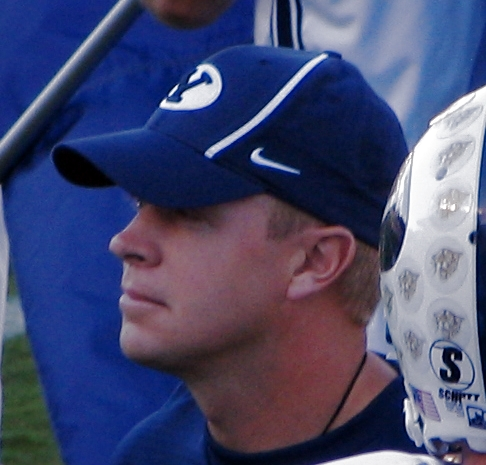
BYU head coach Bronco Mendenhall in 2006

Washington advanced to a record of 9–4. Soon after the game, both running back Bishop Sankey, who was a finalist for the Doak Walker Award, and tight end Austin Seferian-Jenkins, who won the John Mackey Award declared their intentions to forgo their final seasons and enter the 2014 NFL draft. Conversely, however, prior to the draft, defensive tackle Danny Shelton, whom draft analysts speculated would be an "under-the-radar prospect to watch in 2014", announced his intentions to return to school for the 2014 season. BYU fell to a record of 8–5 with the loss. After the game, some BYU fans lobbied for the dismissal of BYU coach Bronco Mendenhall via a trending topic on Twitter. The end of the season was "disappointing" for the Cougars, however there was still some reason for excitement among fans, due to a strong recruiting class.
