= Austin Seferian-Jenkins =

American football player (born 1992)

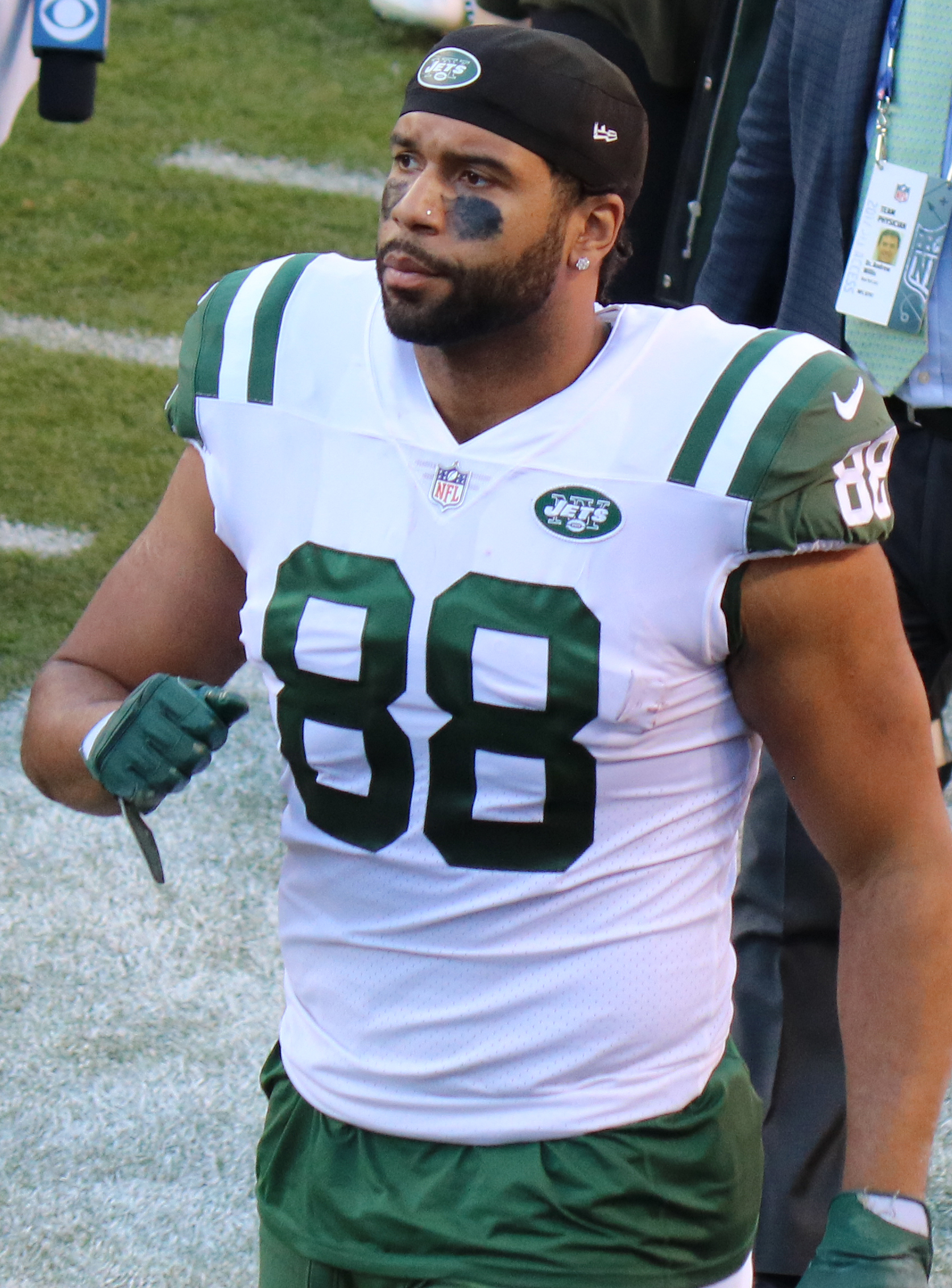
- Seferian-Jenkins with the New York Jets in 2017

No. 87, 88
- Position: Tight end

Personal information
- Born: September 29, 1992 (age 34); Fox Island, Washington, U.S.
- Listed height: 6 ft 5 in (1.96 m)
- Listed weight: 262 lb (119 kg)

Career information
- High school: Gig Harbor (Gig Harbor, Washington)
- College: Washington (2011–2013)
- NFL draft: 2014: 2nd round, 38th overall pick

Career history
- Tampa Bay Buccaneers (2014–2016); New York Jets (2016–2017); Jacksonville Jaguars (2018); New England Patriots (2019)*
- * Offseason or practice squad member only

Awards and highlights
- John Mackey Award (2013); Third-team All-American (2012); 2× Second-team All-Pac-12 (2012, 2013)

Career NFL statistics
- Receptions: 116
- Receiving yards: 1,160
- Receiving touchdowns: 11
- Stats at Pro Football Reference

Austin Edward Seferian-Jenkins (born September 29, 1992) is an American former professional football player who was a tight end in the National Football League (NFL). He was selected by the Tampa Bay Buccaneers in the second round of the 2014 NFL draft. He played college football for the Washington Huskies. He also played for the New York Jets and Jacksonville Jaguars.

== Early life ==
Seferian-Jenkins attended Gig Harbor High School in Gig Harbor, Washington. He played football for the Gig Harbor High School Tides. He had 126 receptions during his career and played in the 2011 U.S. Army All-American Bowl. His mother is of Armenian descent.

Regarded as a four-star recruit by Rivals.com, Seferian-Jenkins was ranked as the second-ranked tight end prospect in his class, behind Nick O'Leary and ahead of Jace Amaro. He chose his home-state school, The University of Washington, over offers from Alabama, Miami (FL), Notre Dame, Oklahoma, Southern California, and Texas because Washington was the only big school to offer him the opportunity to play both basketball and football.

== College career ==
As a true freshman in the 2011 season, Seferian-Jenkins started 10 of 13 games and had 41 receptions for 538 yards and six touchdowns. In addition to football, he played basketball as a freshman. In his sophomore season, he recorded 69 receptions for 852 yards and seven touchdowns. He finished third in the Mackey Award voting. Upon completing his sophomore season, he had already set Washington records with 110 receptions, 1,390 receiving yards, and 13 touchdowns for the tight end position. On August 12, 2013, Seferian-Jenkins suffered a broken pinkie during practice. Head coach Steve Sarkisian announced the next day that Seferian-Jenkins will have to undergo surgery to repair the broken pinkie. Following Washington's 31–16 victory in the 2013 Fight Hunger Bowl, he announced he would leave school early and enter the 2014 NFL draft. He finished his last year with Washington with 36 receptions for 450 receiving yards and eight receiving touchdowns.

== Professional career ==
=== Pre-draft ===
Seferian-Jenkins was a projected a second-round selection by CBS Sports in the 2014 NFL draft.

Pre-draft measurables
Height	Weight	Arm length	Hand span	40-yard dash	Vertical jump	Bench press
6 ft 5 1/2 in (1.97 m)	262 lb (119 kg)	33 3/4 in (0.86 m)	9 3/4 in (0.25 m)	4.56 s	37 1/2 in (0.95 m)	20 reps
All values from NFL Combine except 40 yd dash and Vertical from private workout

=== Tampa Bay Buccaneers ===
==== 2014 season ====
Seferian-Jenkins was selected by the Tampa Bay Buccaneers in the second round with the 38th overall pick in the 2014 NFL draft.

In his rookie season, Sefarian-Jenkins played in nine games making 21 catches for 221 yards and two touchdowns. On October 26, he caught his first career touchdown, which was a seven-yard pass from Mike Glennon, against the Minnesota Vikings. He caught his second and last touchdown of the season, a one-yard pass from Josh McCown, against the Atlanta Falcons. His season was cut short by an injury, landing him on the team's injured reserve list.

==== 2015 season ====
In the 2015 season, with rookie quarterback and first overall pick Jameis Winston, Seferian-Jenkins looked to expand on his rookie season. He had a career day in a season opening loss to the Tennessee Titans. He had five receptions for 110 yards and two touchdowns, which were a five-yard reception in the second quarter and a 41-yard reception in the fourth quarter. Both of Seferian-Jenkins's touchdowns were the first touchdown passes of Winston's NFL career. Seferian-Jenkins's remainder of his 2015 season would not have the success he had in the season opener. He only scored two more touchdowns on the season, which were a nine-yard reception from Winston against the St. Louis Rams and a 43-yard reception from Winston against the Chicago Bears. He played in seven games with 338 receiving yards and four touchdowns.

==== 2016 season ====
Seferian-Jenkins played in the season opener against the Falcons at the Georgia Dome. He had one reception for 30 yards and a touchdown, which would be his only one of the 2016 season. He played one more game with the Buccaneers on September 18, which was against the Arizona Cardinals at the University of Phoenix Stadium. He had two receptions for 14 yards in the 40–7 loss. On September 23, 2016, Seferian-Jenkins was arrested on a DUI charge and was released by the Buccaneers later that day.

=== New York Jets ===
==== 2016 season ====
On September 26, 2016, Seferian-Jenkins was claimed off waivers by the New York Jets.

Seferian-Jenkins recorded 10 total receptions for 110 yards in seven games with the Jets.

==== 2017 season ====
On March 15, 2017, Seferian-Jenkins was suspended the first two weeks of the 2017 season for violating the NFL Policy and Program for Substances of Abuse.

During Week 6 against the New England Patriots, Seferian-Jenkins was thought to have fumbled inches from the endzone, resulting in a touchback. The call was controversial, since he retained possession going to the ground and only momentarily appeared to shift the ball as he crossed the goal line, but ultimately the error loomed large, as the Jets lost the game 17–24. He played in 13 games, of which he started ten, in the 2017 season. He finished with 50 receptions for 357 receiving yards and three receiving touchdowns.

=== Jacksonville Jaguars ===
On March 15, 2018, Seferian-Jenkins signed a two-year, $10 million contract with the Jacksonville Jaguars. He was placed on injured reserve on October 9, 2018, after aggravating a core muscle injury. He played in five games in the 2018 season. He recorded 11 receptions for 90 receiving yards and one touchdown.

On February 18, 2019, the Jaguars declined the option on Seferian-Jenkins' contract, making him a free agent at the start of the new league year.

=== New England Patriots ===
On April 10, 2019, Seferian-Jenkins signed a one-year contract with the New England Patriots. He was released on June 4, 2019, citing personal issues.

== Career statistics ==
=== NFL ===
Year	Team	Games		Receiving							
Year	Team	GP	GS	Tgt	Rec	Yds	Avg	TD	Lng	Y/G	Fum
2014	TB	9	9	38	21	221	10.5	2	30	24.6	1
2015	TB	7	3	39	21	338	16.1	4	43	48.3	0
2016	TB	2	0	3	3	44	14.7	1	30	22.0	0
2016	NYJ	7	2	17	10	110	11.0	0	19	15.7	0
2017	NYJ	13	10	74	50	357	7.1	3	28	27.5	1
2018	JAX	5	5	19	11	90	8.2	1	21	18.0	0
Career		43	29	190	116	1160	10.0	11	43	27.0	2

=== College ===
Year	Team	G	Rec	Yds	Avg	TD
2011	Washington	13	41	538	13.1	6
2012	Washington	13	69	852	12.3	7
2013	Washington	12	36	450	12.5	8
Career		38	146	1,840	12.6	21

== Personal life ==
On March 9, 2013, Seferian-Jenkins was cited for driving under the influence in the University District of Seattle. In July 2013, he pleaded guilty to DUI and served a day in jail. The football team suspended Seferian-Jenkins for one game, the Huskies' 2013 season opener against Boise State.

In addition, Seferian-Jenkins was cited for DUI on the morning of Friday, September 23, 2016. He was released by the Tampa Bay Buccaneers on the same day of the incident.

In May 2017, Seferian-Jenkins opened up regarding his struggles with alcohol, and indicated that he had sought help by attending rehab on an outpatient basis.

Seferian-Jenkins was arrested for DUI for a third time on March 9, 2020.

On January 31, 2022, Seferian-Jenkins was arrested for fourth-degree assault, felony harassment and interfering with the reporting of domestic violence.

== See also ==
- Washington Huskies football statistical leaders
