= Keith Heyward =

American football coach (born 1988)

California Golden Bears
- Title: Defensive backs coach

Personal information
- Born: February 2, 1980 (age 46)

Career information
- College: Oregon State

Career history

Playing
- BC Lions (2001); Scottish Claymores (2002); Los Angeles Avengers (2004)

Coaching
- Oregon State (2005–2006) Graduate assistant; Cal Poly (2007) Linebackers coach; Oregon State (2008–2011) Defensive backs coach; Washington (2012–2013) Defensive backs coach; USC (2014–2015) Defensive backs coach & passing game coordinator; Louisville (2016) Defensive backs coach; Oregon (2017) Safeties coach; Oregon (2018) Co-defensive coordinator & safeties coach; Oregon (2019–2020) Assistant head coach, co-defensive coordinator & safeties coach; California (2021) Outside linebackers coach; UNLV (2022) Defensive coordinator & defensive backs coach; Las Vegas Raiders (2023) Defensive quality control coach; Oregon State (2024) Defensive coordinator; California (2025-present) Defensive backs coach

Keith Heyward Jr. (born February 2, 1980) is an American football coach who is the defensive backs coach for the California Golden Bears of the Atlantic Coast Conference. His football career began at his alma mater, Oregon State, where he started 35 consecutive games as a cornerback for the Beavers. After completing his 4th season with Oregon State, Heyward played professionally. His coaching career kicked off after his professional endeavors, with his most recent coaching positions at the University of Southern California (2014–2015), the University of Washington (2012–2013), the University of Louisville (2016), the University of Oregon (2017–2020), the University of California (2021) and the University of Nevada, Las Vegas (2022).

== Early life ==
Heyward attended Montclair Prep High School in Van Nuys, California his freshman through junior years. He attended Taft High School in Woodland Hills, California for his senior year, during which he had a 13–1 season as a two-way starter. At Taft, he started at safety on defense and at wide receiver on offense. Even though Heyward was at Taft a single year, he was named "first-team all-league (Northwest Valley Conference); first-team all-city in division 4A by the Los Angeles Daily News; second-team all-city defense by the Los Angeles Times; all-San Fernando Valley first-team defense by the Los Angeles Times; and played in the City vs. Southern Section All-Star game in the summer of 1997." At safety his senior year he recorded 78 solo tackles, 41 assisted tackles, 4 tackles for loss, 2 fumble recoveries, 3 blocked kicks and 2 passes intercepted. He returned 14 kickoffs for 372 yards (26.6 average) and one 84-yard touchdown. At offense he caught 37 passes for 722 yards (19.5 average) and had 7 touchdowns as a wide receiver, including a 78-yard TD. Heyward was recruited by Oregon State, Arizona, UCLA, Utah State and Colorado State, but chose Oregon State in the end.

== College career ==
Heyward played college football for Oregon State University. He was a four-year letterman (1997-2000) at cornerback, starting 35 consecutive games. Heyward earned All-Pac-10 honorable mention during his senior year. During his final season he played in 2 bowl games, the 2001 Fiesta Bowl and the all-star Hula Bowl. Through the course of his college career, Heyward made 88 tackles, accumulated 23 pass breakups and had five pass interceptions. He graduated from OSU in 2001 with a bachelor's degree in communication.

== Professional career ==
Keith Heyward played professionally for the British Columbia Lions in the Canadian Football League (2001), the Scottish Claymores in NFL Europe (2002) and the L.A. Avengers in the Arena League (2004).

== Coaching career ==
Heyward started his coaching as a graduate assistant at Oregon State. He worked two seasons at OSU (2005–2006), the first season working mainly with the cornerbacks and the second season with the defensive line through the Sun Bowl. His next coaching position was as the linebackers coach at Cal Poly San Luis Obispo in 2007. While coaching at Cal Poly, the Mustang's defense was ranked first in the Great Western Conference and their total defense third in the league. After coaching at Cal Poly he returned to Oregon State for 4 seasons (2008–2011), this time as the secondary coach. In 2011, Heyward coached second-team All-Pac-12 cornerback Jordan Poyer and safety Lance Mitchell, both of whom earned honorable mention all-conference. During his time at OSU, Heyward also coached future NFL players including: Brandon Hughes, Keenan Lewis, Brandon Hardin, Al Afalava, James Dockery and Suaesi Tuimaunei. Oregon State played in the 2008 Sun Bowl and 2009 Las Vegas Bowl.

Following his time at OSU, Heyward became the secondary coach at the University of Washington for two seasons (2012–2013). Under Heyward, UW's pass defense in 2012 ranked 23rd nationally and safety Sean Parker had 11 career interceptions. During his time at UW, Heyward also coached future NFL players including: 1st round draft pick Desmond Trufant, Greg Ducre and Marcus Peters. In those two seasons, the Huskies went to the 2012 Las Vegas Bowl and 2013 Fight Hunger Bowl (he did not coach in the Fight Hunger Bowl).

In December 2013, Heyward became the University of Southern California's defensive backs coach and pass game coordinator for two seasons (2014–2015). "In 2014, safety-outside linebacker Su’a Cravens made Sophomore All-American first team and All-Pac-12 first team, while cornerback-wide receiver-returner Adoree’ Jackson was a Freshman All-American first teamer. Cornerback-safety Josh Shaw was a fourth round NFL draftee." In 2015, USC inside linebacker Cameron Smith was named Freshman All-American and Pac-12 Defensive Freshman of the Year. Under Heyward's coaching, the Trojans played at the Holiday Bowl (2014) where they defeated Nebraska, and won the Pac-12 South Championship (2015).

Heyward was hired as the Oregon Ducks’ safeties coach in January 2017.

| Year | Team | Position | Bowl |
|---|---|---|---|
| 2005 | Oregon State | Graduate Assistant (Cornerbacks) | -- |
| 2006 | Oregon State | Graduate Assistant (Defensive Line) | Sun |
| 2007 | Cal Poly San Luis Obispo | Linebackers | -- |
| 2008 | Oregon State | Corners | Sun |
| 2009 | Oregon State | Corners | Las Vegas |
| 2010 | Oregon State | Secondary | -- |
| 2011 | Oregon State | Secondary | -- |
| 2012 | Univ. of Washington | Secondary | Las Vegas |
| 2013 | Univ. of Washington | Secondary | Fight Hunger* |
| 2014 | USC | Def. Backs/Pass Games Coord. Defense | Holiday |
| 2015 | USC | Def. Backs/Pass Games Coord. Defense | Holiday* |
| 2016 | Louisville | Def. Backs | Citrus Bowl |
| 2017 | Oregon | Def. Backs/ Safeties | Las Vegas Bowl |
| 2018 | Oregon | Co. Defensive Coord. Safeties | Redbox Bowl |

*Did not coach in bowl game
