= De'Ondre Wesley =

American football player (born 1992)

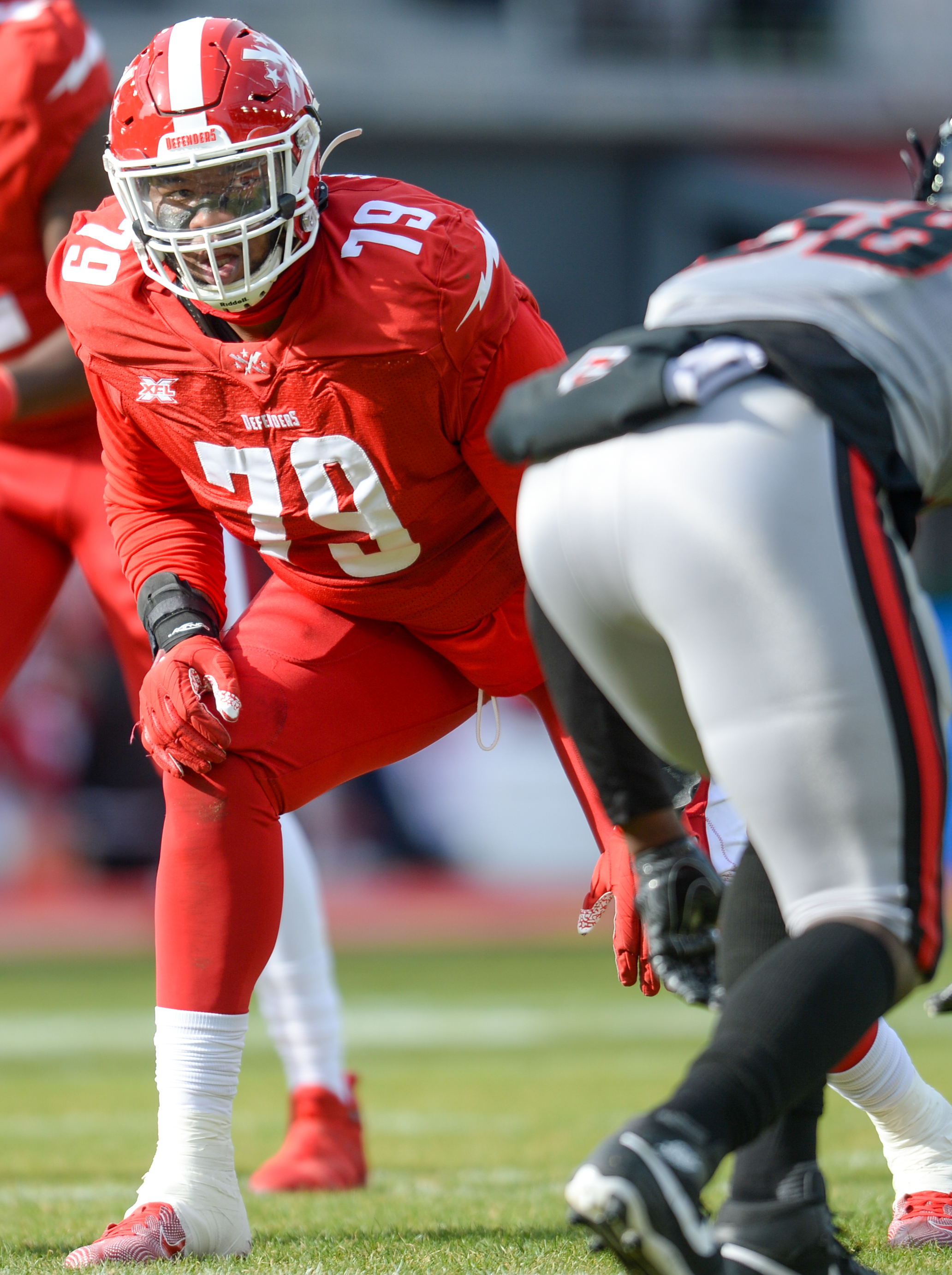
- Wesley with the DC Defenders in 2020

No. 77, 79, 65
- Position: Offensive tackle

Personal information
- Born: July 28, 1992 (age 34); Castro Valley, California, U.S.
- Listed height: 6 ft 7 in (2.01 m)
- Listed weight: 330 lb (150 kg)

Career information
- High school: Deer Valley (Antioch, California)
- College: Brigham Young
- NFL draft: 2015: undrafted

Career history
- Baltimore Ravens (2015–2016); Buffalo Bills (2017–2018)*; Indianapolis Colts (2018)*; Buffalo Bills (2019)*; DC Defenders (2020); Edmonton Elks (2021); Hamilton Tiger-Cats (2022)*
- * Offseason or practice squad member only

Career NFL statistics
- Games played: 7
- Stats at Pro Football Reference

De'Ondre Wesley (born July 28, 1992) is an American former professional football player who was an offensive tackle in the National Football League (NFL) and Canadian Football League (CFL). He played college football for the BYU Cougars from 2013 to 2014. He previously attended junior college at Diablo Valley College.

== Professional career ==
=== Baltimore Ravens ===
Wesley was signed by the Baltimore Ravens on May 2, 2015, after going undrafted. On September 3, he was placed on injured reserve.

On September 1, 2017, Wesley was waived by the Ravens during final roster cutdowns.

=== Buffalo Bills (first stint) ===
On September 5, 2017, Wesley was signed to the Buffalo Bills' practice squad. He signed a reserve/future contract with the Bills on January 8, 2018.

On September 1, 2018, Wesley was waived by the Bills and was re-signed to the practice squad the next day. He was released by the Bills on September 13.

=== Indianapolis Colts ===
On November 6, 2018, Wesley was signed to the Indianapolis Colts' practice squad, but was released on November 13. He was re-signed by Indianapolis on December 5. Wesley signed a reserve/future contract with the Colts on January 13, 2019. He was waived by Indianapolis on May 21.

=== Buffalo Bills (second stint) ===
On May 22, 2019, Wesley was claimed off of waivers by the Bills. He was waived with an injury settlement on August 28.

=== DC Defenders ===
Wesley was selected in the 2020 XFL Draft by the DC Defenders. He had his contract terminated when the league suspended operations on April 10, 2020.

=== Edmonton Elks ===
Wesley signed with the Edmonton Elks of the CFL on April 1, 2021. He dressed in three games, all starts, for the Elks in 2021. He was released on January 27, 2022.

=== Hamilton Tiger-Cats ===
Wesley was signed by the Hamilton Tiger-Cats on March 25, 2022. He was released by the Tigers-Cats on June 5.
