= Sae Tautu =

American football player (born 1992)

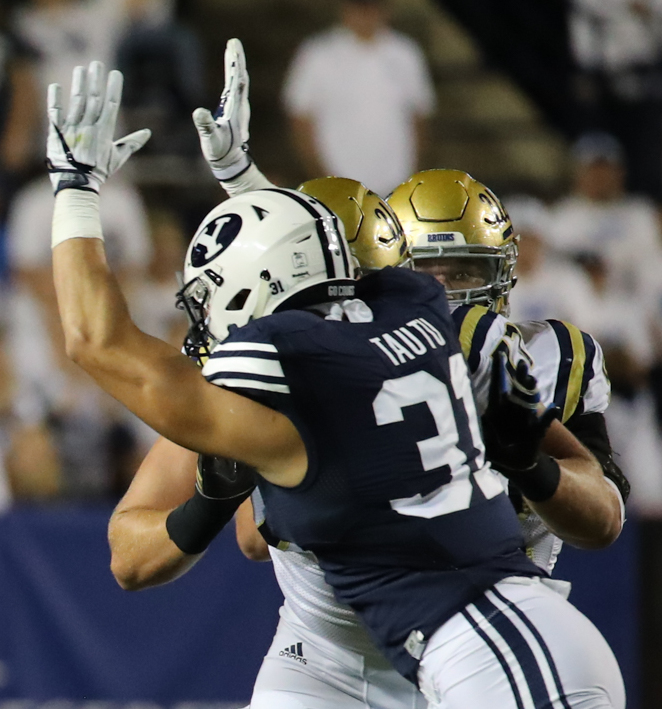
- Tautu with the BYU Cougars in 2016

No. 31
- Position: Linebacker

Personal information
- Born: June 30, 1992 (age 34); American Fork, Utah, U.S.
- Listed height: 6 ft 3 in (1.91 m)
- Listed weight: 245 lb (111 kg)

Career information
- High school: Lone Peak (Highland, Utah)
- College: BYU
- NFL draft: 2017: undrafted

Career history
- New Orleans Saints (2017–2018)*
- * Offseason or practice squad member only

Bradford Saepele "Sae" Tautu (born June 30, 1992) is an American former professional football player who was a linebacker in the National Football League (NFL). He played college football for the BYU Cougars.

== Early life and education ==
Born in American Fork, Utah, Tautu played college football at Brigham Young University for the Cougars.

== Professional career ==
Tautu signed with the New Orleans Saints as an undrafted free agent on May 1, 2017. He was waived/injured on August 1, 2017 and placed on injured reserve after suffering an MCL sprain. He was released on August 12, 2017. On January 8, 2018, Tautu signed a reserve/future contract with the Saints. He was waived on May 8, 2018.
