= Bishop Sankey =

American gridiron football player (born 1992)

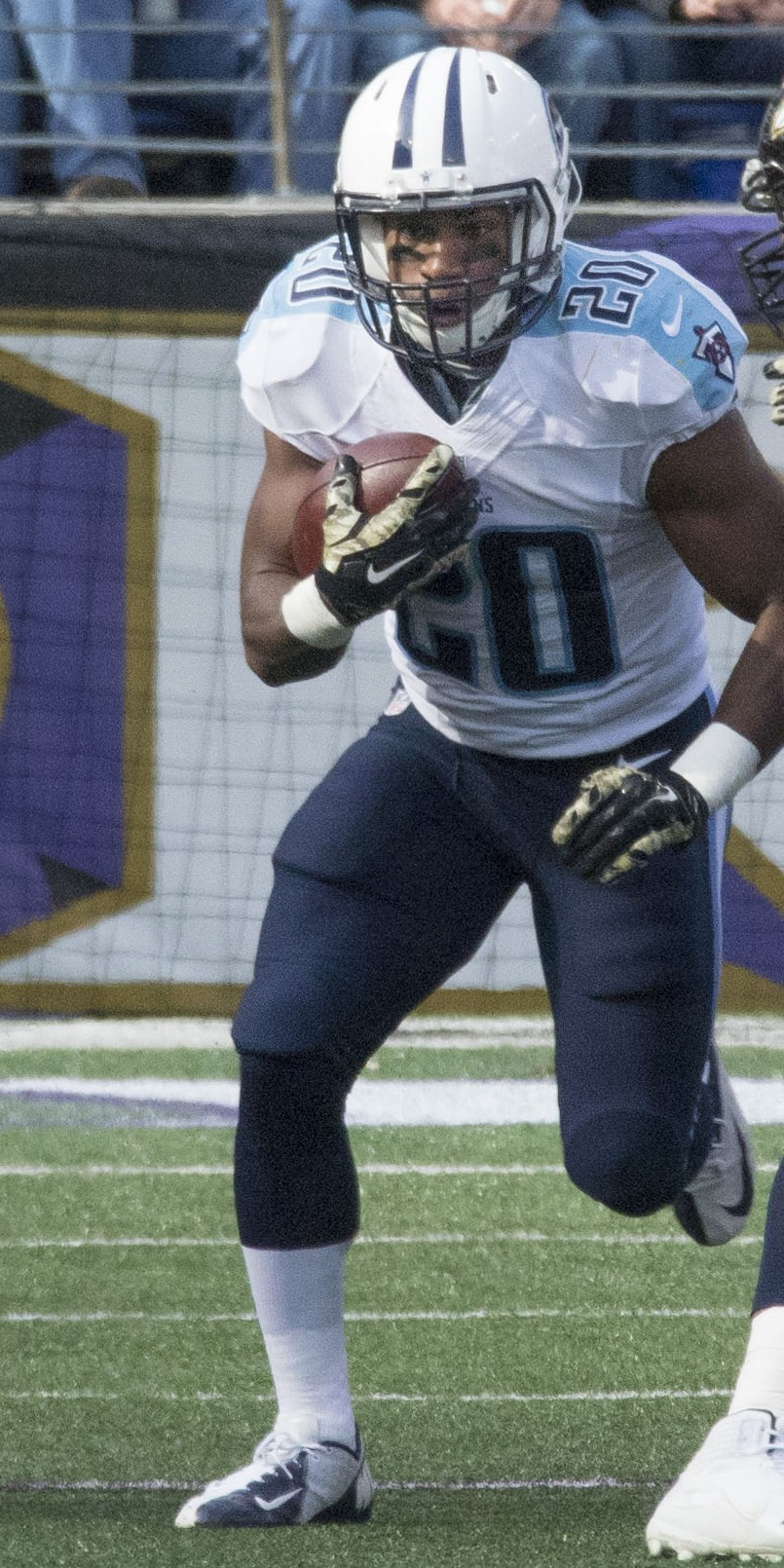
- Sankey with the Tennessee Titans in 2014

No. 20, 33
- Position: Running back

Personal information
- Born: September 15, 1992 (age 34); Wadsworth, Ohio, U.S.
- Listed height: 5 ft 10 in (1.78 m)
- Listed weight: 213 lb (97 kg)

Career information
- High school: Gonzaga Prep (Spokane, Washington)
- College: Washington (2011–2013)
- NFL draft: 2014: 2nd round, 54th overall pick

Career history
- Tennessee Titans (2014–2015); New England Patriots (2016)*; Kansas City Chiefs (2016); Minnesota Vikings (2016–2017); San Diego Fleet (2019); Toronto Argonauts (2019–2020)
- * Offseason or practice squad member only

Awards and highlights
- Second-team All-American (2013); First-team All-Pac-12 (2013)

Career NFL statistics
- Rushing yards: 762
- Rushing average: 3.8
- Rushing touchdowns: 3
- Receptions: 32
- Receiving yards: 272
- Receiving touchdowns: 1
- Stats at Pro Football Reference

Bishop Sankey (born September 15, 1992) is an American former professional football player who was a running back in the National Football League (NFL). He was selected by the Tennessee Titans in the second round of the 2014 NFL draft. Sankey played college football for the Washington Huskies.

After starting 12 games over two seasons with the Titans, Sankey then spent parts of the 2016 regular season on the rosters of the New England Patriots, Kansas City Chiefs and Minnesota Vikings without seeing any game action. He re-signed with the Vikings in 2017, but missed the entire season due to injury. After a year away from football, Sankey saw game action again playing for the San Diego Fleet of the short-lived Alliance of American Football in 2019. Later that year, he was signed to the practice roster of the Toronto Argonauts of the Canadian Football League (CFL). After the cancellation of the 2020 CFL season, he signed an extension with the Argonauts in 2021, but retired before the season began.

== Early life ==
Born in 1992 in Wadsworth, Ohio, to Julie Anne Becker and Christopher Daniel Sankey, Bishop spent his early years with his mother, Julie, and grandparents, William and Carol Becker, in Wadsworth, Ohio until age 7. He moved with his father, a non-commissioned officer in the U.S. Air Force to Fairchild AFB near Spokane, Washington, when Sankey was in the eighth grade, relocating from Wright-Patterson AFB near Dayton, Ohio. He finished that school year in 2007 at the middle school in Cheney, then enrolled as a freshman at Gonzaga Prep in Spokane and graduated in 2011. When he was a sophomore in 2008, the Bullpups compiled an 8–2 record. That season, Sankey rushed for 526 yards while splitting time in the backfield, averaging 10.5 yards per carry. He earned All-Greater Spokane League first-team and All-State Class 4A honorable mention as a junior, amassing 2,011 yards with 17 rushing touchdowns in nine contests. He opened the season with four 200-yard rushing performances and by midseason, he had shattered the previous school record of 1,299 yards on the ground by Tim Lappano in 1974. As a senior, Sankey established league and district season and career rushing records. He totaled 2,518 yards with 33 touchdowns on 281 carries (8.96 ypc), becoming the only player in district annals to produce a pair of "top ten" rushing seasons on the annual record chart. That season would see him gain 359 yards against Mead, the third-highest game total in GSL annals. Sankey closed out his career as the state and Greater Spokane League record-holder with 4,355 yards rushing. His 198 points scored set another season mark and his career total of 306 points rank third. He was named the Inland Northwest amateur athlete of the year for his efforts. Following his senior season, Sankey was invited to perform at the U.S. Army National Combine, attended by over 500 players, where he recorded a 20-yard shuttle time of 3.90, the second-best at the event, while his 4.4 clocking in the 40-yard dash was also the best for any player in attendance.

Sankey was also a member of the Gonzaga Prep track and field team, where he performed as a sprinter and as a member of the relay teams, in addition to performing as a jumper. As a sophomore, he recorded season-bests of 11.40 in the 100 meters at the Jesuit Twilight Outdoor Relays, along with a 6.43-meter (21'1") long jump and a 12.48-meter (40'11.25") triple jump in Greater Spokane League competition. He also ran a leg on the Bullpups' 4x100, 4x200 and 4x400 relay teams. The following season, Sankey again starred for the school's outdoor track team. He posted a season-best 11.28 seconds in the 100 meters at the GSL District Meet, and 23.21 in the 200 meters at the regionals, followed by a 400-meter clocking of 54.84. As a senior, he boasted season-best times of 11.54 in the 100 meters, 23.94 in the 200 and 55.14 in the 400. He also ran a leg on the 4x100 and 4x200 relay teams that placed second in both events at the Ray Cockrum Relays.

Regarded as a four-star recruit by Rivals.com, Sankey initially gave a "soft verbal" commitment to Washington State University as a junior in December 2009, then changed his mind as a senior - “on letter of intent day” & accepted a scholarship from head coach Steve Sarkisian to play football at the University of Washington.

College recruiting
Name	Hometown	School	Height	Weight	40^{‡}	Commit date
Bishop Sankey; RB	Wadsworth, Ohio	Gonzaga Preparatory School	5 ft 10 in (1.78 m)	183 lb (83 kg)	4.4	Jan 26, 2011
Bishop Sankey; RB	Recruit ratings: Scout: Rivals:					
Overall recruit ranking: Scout: 35 (RB) Rivals: 19 (RB); 5 (WA); 235 (national)
‡ Refers to 40-yard dash; Note: In many cases, Scout, Rivals, 247Sports, On3, and ESPN may conflict in their listings of height, weight and 40 time.; In these cases, the average was taken. ESPN grades are on a 100-point scale.; Sources: "2011 Washington Football Commitment List". Rivals.; "2011 Team Ranking". Rivals.com.

== College career ==
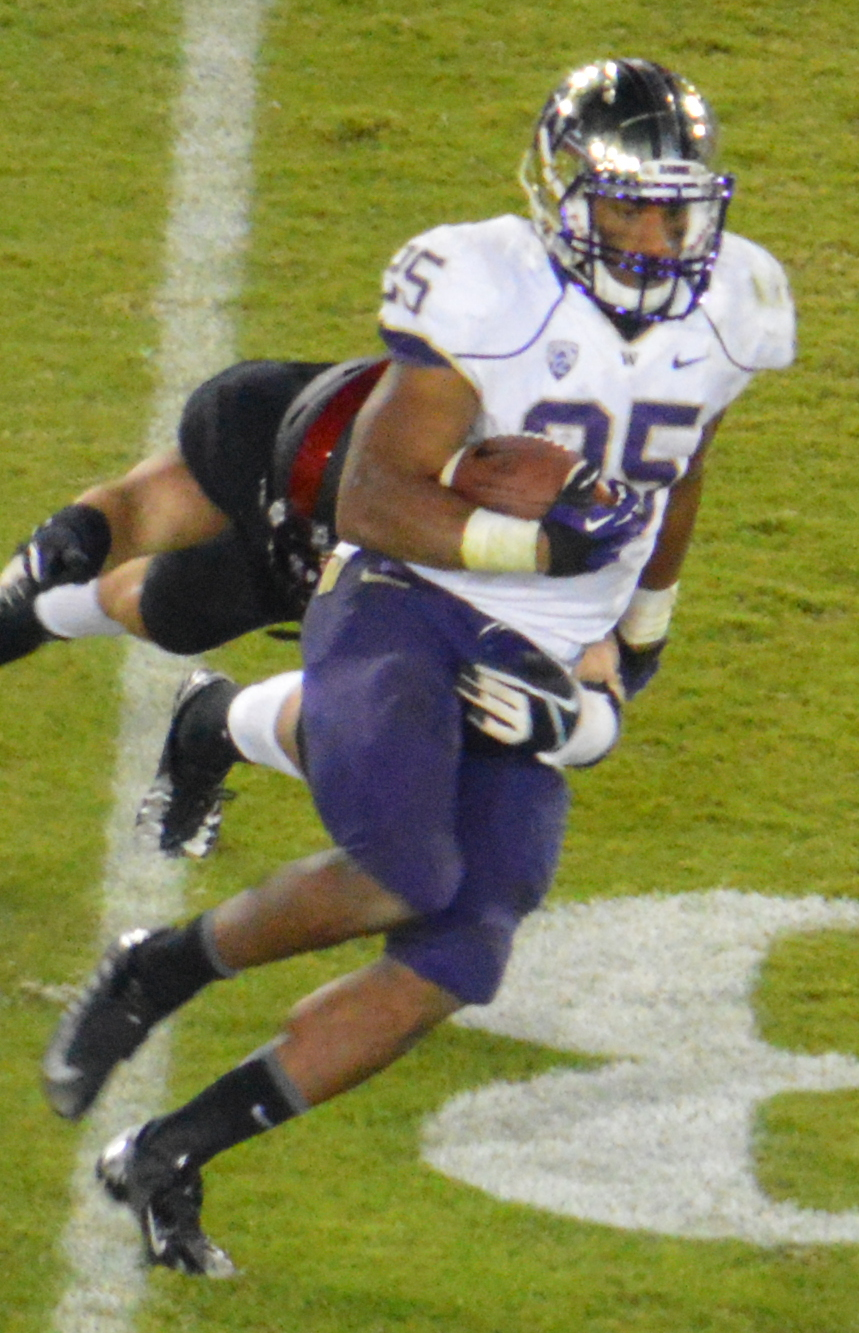
Sankey with Washington in 2013

Sankey appeared in 38 games for the Washington Huskies, starting his last 25 contests. He carried the ball 644 times for 3,496 yards (third-most in Huskies' history) and scored 37 touchdowns on the ground, while also adding 567 yards and one more score on 67 receptions (8.46 ypc) and 134 yards on seven kickoff returns (19.14 avg) for a total of 4,197 all-purpose yards (110.45 ypg). In 2013, with a 200-yard game against Washington State in the Apple Cup, he finished the game and the regular season with 1,775 yards for the season, breaking Corey Dillon's 1996 record of 1,695 yards. On the same play on which he passed Dillon, a seven-yard touchdown run in the third quarter, he also broke Napoleon Kaufman's school career rushing touchdowns record, with his 35th. He decided to forego his senior season and enter the NFL draft in January 2013.

=== Freshman season ===
After rushing for 2,518 yards as a senior in high school, Sankey only carried the ball 28 times as a true freshman at Washington in 2011, but made the most of his limited chances as he gained 187 yards, an average of 6.68 yards per attempt. He scored just once, but had big carries that set up eight touchdown drives and key receptions that resulted in two more scoring marches for the Huskies. Nine of Sankey's carries resulted in first downs, with eight of those gaining at least 10 yards. He also added six receptions and in the Alamo Bowl's wild 67–56 loss to Baylor, and also handled kickoff return duties.

=== Sophomore season ===
With Chris Polk having left for the National Football League, the Huskies opened the 2012 campaign with Sankey in a reserve role. When junior halfback Jesse Callier was injured in Washington's first game against San Diego State, Sankey stepped into the starting lineup the next week and never relinquished his role with the first unit. He was the MVP of the 2012 Maaco Bowl Las Vegas after rushing for 205 yards and 74 receiving yards on six receptions. Sankey ended up rushing for 1,439 yards on 289 carries (4.98 ypc), both rank third on the school season-record chart. His 16 touchdown runs are surpassed by only Corey Dillon (who had 24 touchdowns in 1996) on the Huskies annual record list. Sankey averaged 110.69 yards per game on the ground, the 19th-best average in the NCAA Football Bowl Subdivision ranks that year. He also served as a safety valve for quarterback Keith Price, catching 16 of the 22 passes targeted to him, good for 249 yards. He led the team in scoring with 96 points and registered 1,688 all-purpose yards, the seventh-best figure by a Husky in a season.

=== Junior season ===
After being named one of the team's offensive captains, Sankey rewarded his teammates for that honor when he exploded for 161 yards and two touchdowns on 25 carries in the 2013 season opener against Boise State. He also came up with other big carries that set up two more touchdown drives, along with a big reception that led to a field goal. With his mother, aunts and uncles in the stands at Chicago's Soldier Field, Sankey exploded for a career-best 208 yards and a touchdown on a career-high 35 carries against Illinois. He would establish school career and season records when he again reached the 200-yard rushing level in the 2013 Apple Cup against Washington State. During his junior season, Sankey also proved to be a highly capable blocker, registering seventy-six knockdowns and 10 touchdown-resulting blocks. He was named Second-team All-American and First-team All-2013 All-Pac-12 Conference football team at the end of the season.

Sankey entered the 2014 NFL draft after his junior season. He finished his college career as Washington's career leader in rushing touchdowns and third all-time in rushing yards.

== Professional career ==
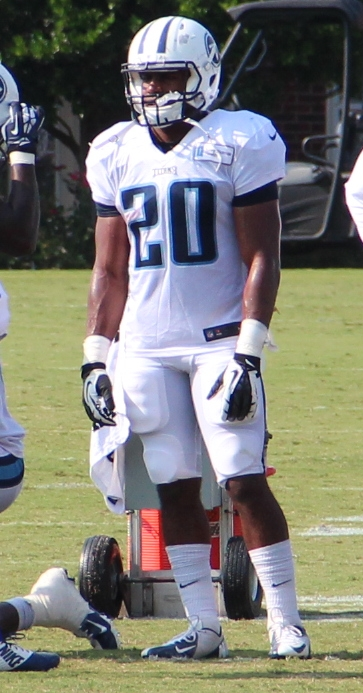
Sankey with the Titans in 2014

Pre-draft measurables
Height	Weight	Arm length	Hand span	Wingspan	40-yard dash	10-yard split	20-yard split	20-yard shuttle	Three-cone drill	Vertical jump	Broad jump	Bench press
5 ft 9 1/2 in (1.77 m)	209 lb (95 kg)	31 in (0.79 m)	10 in (0.25 m)	6 ft 1 in (1.85 m)	4.49 s	1.53 s	2.61 s	4.00 s	6.75 s	35.5 in (0.90 m)	10 ft 6 in (3.20 m)	26 reps
All values from NFL Combine

=== Tennessee Titans ===
The Tennessee Titans selected Sankey in the second round of the 2014 NFL draft. Chosen with the 54th overall pick, he was the first running back off the board, the latest for a first running back in the history of the NFL draft.

On June 17, 2014, Sankey signed a four-year contract with the Titans. Sankey scored his first NFL touchdown against the Indianapolis Colts on September 28. Sankey finished his rookie season with 569 yards on 152 carries and two touchdowns. Sankey recorded an additional 133 receiving yards on 18 receptions.

Sankey opened the 2015 season with a career-high 74 yards on 12 carries and one touchdown. However following Week 6, Sankey would only receive eight carries for 34 yards and six receptions and was a healthy scratch three times. Sankey started only three games in 2015, down from the previous year's nine.

On September 2, 2016, Sankey was released by the Titans as part of final roster cuts. Sankey started 12 of the 29 games he played for the Titans, totaling 199 rushes, 762 yards and three touchdowns on the ground. He also added 32 receptions on 45 targets for 272 yards (8.5 yards per catch) and a score through the air from 2014 to 2015.

=== New England Patriots ===
On September 5, 2016, Sankey was signed to the practice squad of the New England Patriots.

=== Kansas City Chiefs ===
On November 1, 2016, Sankey was signed by the Kansas City Chiefs off the Patriots' practice squad. He was released by the Chiefs on November 22.

=== Minnesota Vikings ===
On November 25, 2016, Sankey was signed to the Minnesota Vikings' practice squad. He signed a reserve/futures contract with the Vikings on January 2, 2017.

In the first game of the 2017 preseason, Sankey tore his ACL and was ruled out for the season.

=== San Diego Fleet ===
On September 5, 2018, Sankey signed with San Diego Fleet of the Alliance of American Football (AAF) for the 2019 season. He suffered an injury before the season began and was placed on the roster exempt list, a designation that later became injured reserve. He was promoted to the active roster on March 4. In the remaining 4 games prior to the AAF's bankruptcy, Sankey recorded 119 yards on 30 rushing attempts, as well as 5 receptions for 20 yards. The league ceased operations in April 2019.

=== Toronto Argonauts ===
With two weeks remaining in the 2019 CFL season, Sankey was signed to the practice roster by the Toronto Argonauts of the Canadian Football League (CFL). The CFL cancelled its 2020 season due to the COVID-19 pandemic. He signed a contract extension with the Argonauts on December 28, 2020. He retired from football on July 10, 2021, on the first day of the Argos' training camp.

== Career statistics ==
=== NFL ===
Season	Team	Games		Rushing					Fumbles		Receiving					Kick return				
Season	Team	GP	GS	Att	Yds	Avg	Lng	TD	FUM	Lost	Rec	Yds	Avg	Lng	TD	Ret	Yds	Avg	Lng	TD
2014	TEN	16	9	152	569	3.7	22	2	2	2	18	133	7.4	41	0	7	198	28.3	42	0
2015	TEN	13	3	47	193	4.1	16	1	2	1	14	139	9.9	30	1	9	192	21.3	34	0
Total		29	12	199	762	3.8	22	3	4	3	32	272	8.5	30	1	16	390	24.4	42	0

*Sankey was on the Chiefs active roster for 3 games during the 2016 season and was inactive for all 3 games

=== College ===
		Rushing					Receiving		
Year	Team	Att	Yds	Avg	Lng	TD	Rec	Yds	TD
2011	Washington	28	187	6.7	33	1	6	14	0
2012	Washington	289	1,439	5.0	61	16	33	249	0
2013	Washington	327	1,870	5.7	60	20	28	304	1
Career		644	3,496	5.4	61	37	67	567	1

== Post-playing career ==
On June 21, 2022, Sankey joined the Titans' scouting staff as a Nunn-Wooten Scouting Fellow for the team's training camp.

== See also ==
- Washington Huskies football statistical leaders
