= Algie Brown =

American football player (born 1991)

Algernon Brown
No. 24
- Position: Fullback

Personal information
- Born: November 29, 1991 (age 34); Salt Lake City, Utah, U.S.
- Listed height: 6 ft 1 in (1.85 m)
- Listed weight: 218 lb (99 kg)

Career information
- High school: Skyline (Millcreek, Utah)
- College: BYU
- NFL draft: 2017: undrafted

Career history
- Seattle Seahawks (2017)*; New York Jets (2017)*; Kansas City Chiefs (2018)*
- * Offseason or practice squad member only

Algernon "Algie" Brown (born November 29, 1991) is an American former football fullback. He played college football at Brigham Young.

== Professional career ==
=== Seattle Seahawks ===
Brown signed with the Seattle Seahawks as an undrafted free agent on May 12, 2017. He was waived on July 29, 2017.

=== New York Jets ===
On August 5, 2017, Brown signed with the New York Jets. He was waived on August 13, 2017.

=== Kansas City Chiefs ===
On June 14, 2018, Brown signed with the Kansas City Chiefs. He was waived on September 1, 2018.
