= Keith Price =

American gridiron football player (born 1991)

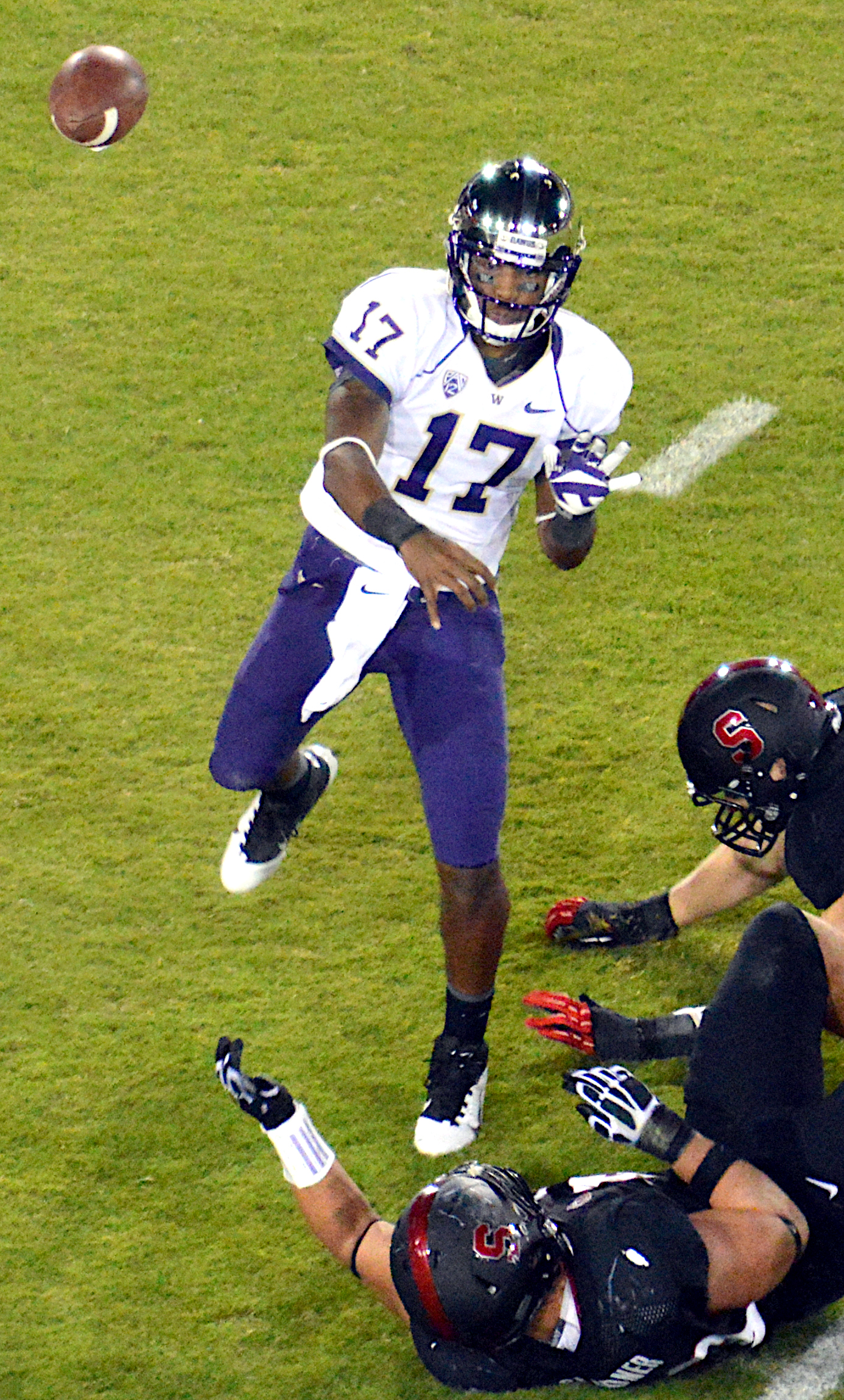
- Price with Washington in 2013

Idaho State Bengals
- Title: Wide receivers coach

Personal information
- Born: June 28, 1991 (age 35); Los Angeles, California, U.S.
- Listed height: 6 ft 1 in (1.85 m)
- Listed weight: 202 lb (92 kg)

Career information
- High school: St. John Bosco (Bellflower, California)
- College: Washington (2009–2013)
- NFL draft: 2014: undrafted

Career history

Playing
- Seattle Seahawks (2014)*; Saskatchewan Roughriders (2014–2015); BC Lions (2016–2017); San Diego Fleet (2019)*; Birmingham Iron (2019)
- * Offseason or practice squad member only

Coaching
- Pierce (2021) Quarterbacks coach; Boise State (2022) Graduate assistant; Idaho State (2023–present) Wide receivers coach

Career CFL statistics
- Passing completions: 33
- Passing attempts: 51
- Passing yards: 413
- TD–INT: 3–1
- Stats at CFL.ca
- Stats at Pro Football Reference

Keith Price (born June 28, 1991) is an American college football coach and former quarterback. He is the wide receivers coach for Idaho State University, a position he has held since 2023. He played college football at Washington, where he was the starting quarterback from 2011 to 2013. He signed with the Seattle Seahawks of the National Football League (NFL) as an undrafted free agent following the 2014 NFL draft. He had stints with the Saskatchewan Roughriders and BC Lions of the Canadian Football League (CFL) and the San Diego Fleet and Birmingham Iron of the Alliance of American Football (AAF).

== Early life ==
Price grew up in Compton, California, and attended St. John Bosco High School in Bellflower, California. As a senior at St. John Bosco, he completed 143 of 200 passes for 2,260 yards and 24 touchdowns, while also rushing for 579 yards and 10 touchdowns. Price's performance in high school was overshadowed by Matt Barkley who became the Gatorade National Football Player of the Year while playing for Bosco rival Mater Dei High School in Santa Ana, California. Price was co-MVP of the Trinity League.

== College career ==
In July 2008, Price announced that he had accepted a football scholarship to attend the University of Washington.

=== 2010 season ===
After serving on the scout team while redshirting in 2009, Price became the Huskies' backup quarterback in 2010. He appeared in eight games and was the starting quarterback against the No. 1 ranked Oregon Ducks. He completed 14 of 28 passes against Oregon for 127 yards, no interceptions, and a touchdown. He also replaced Jake Locker against USC, and threw a touchdown pass on his first play in the game.

=== 2011 season ===
Price became Washington's starting quarterback as a redshirt sophomore in 2011. In the second game of the season, he completed 18 of 25 passes for 315 yards and four touchdowns in a 40-32 victory over Hawaii. The following week, he threw for 271 yards and four touchdowns, while taking a hard hit on a sack from defensive lineman Jared Crick in the second quarter, in a 38-51 loss against the Nebraska Cornhuskers.

During the 2011 regular season, Price completed 219 of 325 passes for 2,625 yards and a school record 29 touchdowns. His 161.9 quarterback rating ranked 13th among all NCAA Division I FBS players, and his 29 touchdown passes ranked seventh. Despite posting impressive statistics, Price had not garnered the nationwide media attention received by other leading quarterbacks. Price acknowledged feeling ignored but added, "I kind of like flying under the radar." In the Alamo Bowl that season against the Baylor Bears, Price threw for over 400 yards, four touchdown passes and three touchdown runs. Despite Price's effort, Washington lost 67-56. Price then began receiving a lot more attention as a future Heisman Trophy candidate. In 2011 as more attention grew, he was given the nickname "Teeth" Price for his charismatic smile during his interviews.

=== 2012 season ===
During the 2012 season, Price completed 263 of 432 passes for 2,728 yards with 19 touchdowns and 13 interceptions.

=== 2013 season ===
During the 2013 season, Price completed 233 of 352 passes for 2,966 yards with 21 touchdowns and 6 interceptions. His final collegiate game came in the team's 31-16 victory in the 2013 Fight Hunger Bowl. He finished his career with 8,921 passing yards and 75 touchdowns.

== Professional career ==
Following the 2014 NFL draft, Price signed as an undrafted free agent with the Seattle Seahawks. On June 16, 2014, the Seattle Seahawks released Price.

On September 9, 2014, Price was signed by the Saskatchewan Roughriders of the Canadian Football League. On November 8, 2015, Price made his first career CFL start. His contract was not renewed in 2016 and he became a free agent. On March 23, 2016, the BC Lions signed Price to a contract. On June 10, 2017, he was released by the BC Lions.

On September 5, 2018, Price was announced as a new signing for the San Diego Fleet of the Alliance of American Football. After going undrafted in the 2019 AAF QB Draft, he was signed by the Birmingham Iron on January 16, 2019, and made the final roster on January 30. In the fifth game against the Orlando Apollos, Price replaced struggling starter Luis Perez in the 31–14 defeat. Price completed 18 of 29 passes for 234 yards and a touchdown, with the 30-yard score to running back Brandon Ross being Birmingham's first passing touchdown of the 2019 AAF season. However, the following week the Iron turned back to Perez, when Price went down early in the game with an injury. Price could have returned but head coach Tim Lewis elected to keep Perez in; Price's stat line read 3 completions on 4 attempts for 18 yards, and one rush for 9 yards. Price relieved Perez again in week 8, coming off the bench to complete both of his pass attempts for 31 yards in a victory over the Atlanta Legends. It would have been a playoff clinching win, but the league suspended operations several days later.

== Coaching career ==
In 2021, Price was hired as the quarterbacks coach for Los Angeles Pierce College.

In 2022, Price joined Boise State as a graduate assistant under head coach Andy Avalos.

In 2023, Price was hired as the wide receivers coach at Idaho State under new head coach Cody Hawkins.

== Career statistics ==
=== CFL statistics ===
Year	Team	Games		Passing							Rushing				Fumbles	
Year	Team	GP	GS	Cmp	Att	Pct	Yds	Avg	TD	Int	Att	Yds	Avg	TD	Fum	Lost
2014	SSK	4	0	0	0	0.0	0	0.0	0	0	0	0	0.0	0	0	0
2015	SSK	13	1	32	50	64.0	407	8.1	3	1	9	46	5.1	0	0	0
2016	BC	18	0	1	1	100.0	6	6.0	0	0	0	0	0.0	0	0	0
Career		35	2	33	51	64.7	413	8.1	3	1	9	46	5.1	0	0	0

=== AAF statistics ===
Year	Team	League	Games			Passing								Rushing			
Year	Team	League	GP	GS	Record	Cmp	Att	Pct	Yds	Y/A	TD	Int	Rtg	Att	Yds	Avg	TD
2019	BIR	AAF	6	1	1–0	23	35	65.7	283	8.1	1	0	100.1	12	30	2.5	0
Career			6	1	1–0	23	35	65.7	283	8.1	1	0	100.1	12	30	2.5	0

== See also ==
- Washington Huskies football statistical leaders
