= 2015 Las Vegas Bowl =

2015 Royal Purple Las Vegas Bowl
- Holy War in Sin City; 24th Las Vegas Bowl
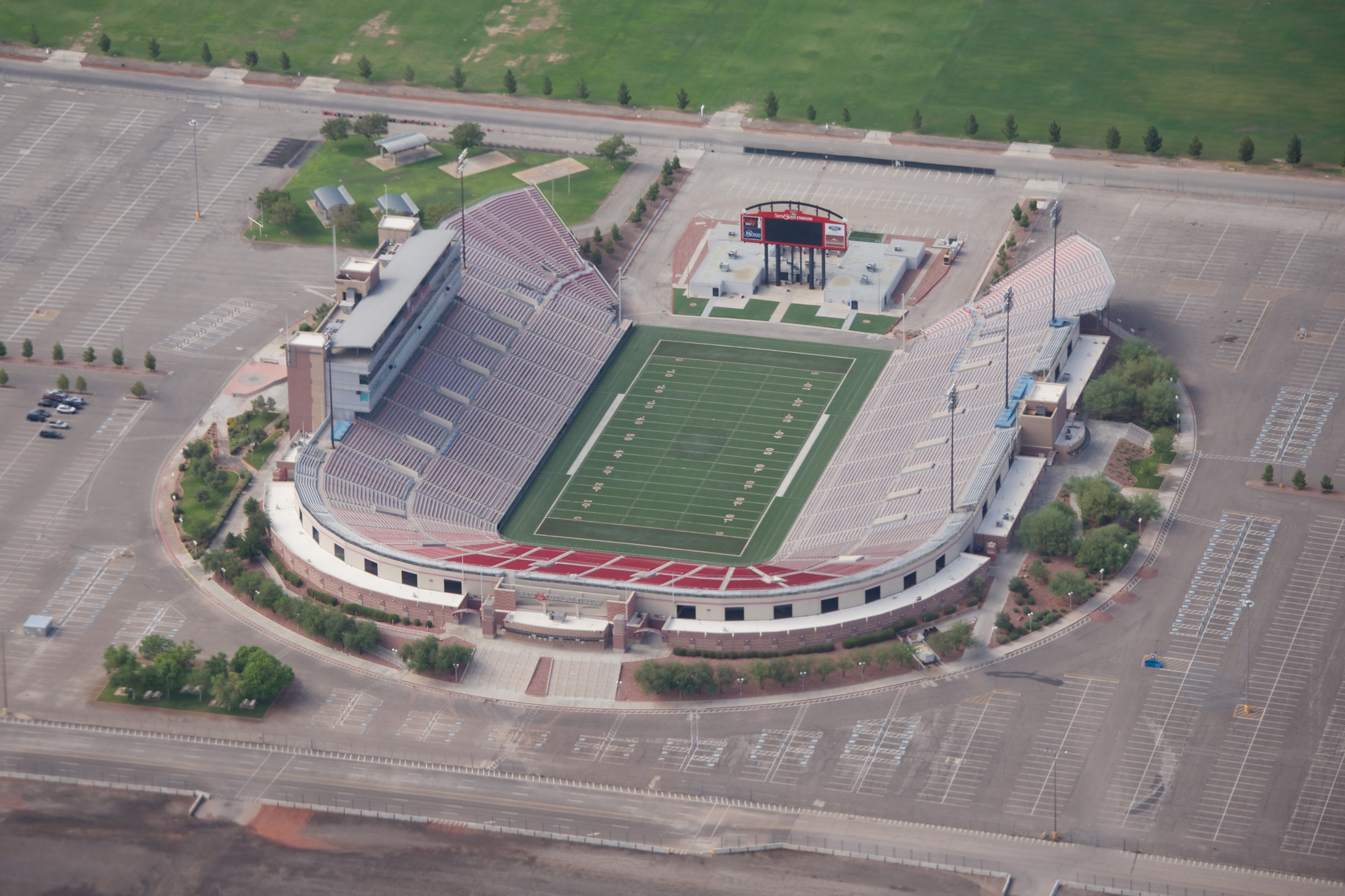
- Sam Boyd Stadium in Whitney, Nevada, hosted the Las Vegas Bowl.
BYU Cougars	Utah Utes
(9–3)	(9–3)
Independent	Pac-12
28	35
Head coach: Bronco Mendenhall	Head coach: Kyle Whittingham
	AP / Coaches / CFP; 20 / 20 / 22
	1	2	3	4	Total
BYU	0	7	7	14	28
Utah	35	0	0	0	35
- Date: December 19, 2015
- Season: 2015
- Stadium: Sam Boyd Stadium
- Location: Whitney, Nevada
- MVP: Utah DB Tevin Carter
- Favorite: Utah by 2
- Referee: Mark Kluczynski (MAC)
- Attendance: 42,213
- Payout: US$1,350,000

United States TV coverage
- Network: ABC; Sports USA
- Announcers: Brent Musburger, Jesse Palmer, Maria Taylor (ABC); Mike Morgan, Gary Barnett, Jonathan Von Tobel (Sports USA)

The 2015 Las Vegas Bowl was a post-season American college football bowl game played on December 19, 2015, at Sam Boyd Stadium in the Las Vegas suburb of Whitney, Nevada. The 24th edition of the Las Vegas Bowl featured the BYU Cougars against the Utah Utes, earning the game the moniker the Holy War in Sin City (named for the "Holy War" rivalry game and the "Sin City" nickname for Las Vegas). The game sold out 24 hours after the matchup was announced. It began at 12:30 p.m. PST and aired on ABC. It was one of the 2015–16 bowl games that concluded the 2015 FBS football season. Sponsored by lubricant manufacturer Royal Purple, it was officially known as the Royal Purple Las Vegas Bowl.

== Teams ==
The game featured the BYU Cougars against their state rival, the Utah Utes. It was the 96th meeting in the Holy War rivalry, with Utah leading the series 57–34–4 entering the game. The two schools are 50 miles (80 km) apart, approximately an hour's drive on Interstate 15. The name refers to the fact that BYU is owned and administered by The Church of Jesus Christ of Latter-day Saints (LDS Church), the largest church in Mormonism, while Utah is a secular and public university with a substantial LDS student population.

Their previous meeting before the Las Vegas Bowl was in 2013, when the Utes defeated the Cougars 20–13 in Provo. In addition to determining the Las Vegas Bowl Champion, the game decided the 2015 Beehive Boot champion. The game cut short a scheduled hiatus in the rivalry; the teams had not played in the 2014 or 2015 regular seasons in but would resume doing so in 2016 to allow Utah to play a home-and-home against Michigan.

=== BYU Cougars ===
After finishing their regular season with a 9–3 record, bowl director John Saccenti extended an invitation for the Cougars to play in the game, which they accepted.

This was the Cougars' sixth Las Vegas Bowl, extending their record for most appearances in the game. So far, the Cougars are 3–2 in the Las Vegas Bowl, having appeared in five consecutive games from 2005 until 2009.

It was the final game at BYU for head coach Bronco Mendenhall, who accepted the same position with the Virginia Cavaliers on December 4, and for assistant coaches Robert Anae, Garett Tujague, Mark Atuaia, Jason Beck, Nick Howell, and Kelly Poppinga, who accepted positions on Virginia's new coaching staff.

During the postgame interviews, athletic director Tom Holmoe stepped in during one segment and announced that Kalani Sitake had been officially hired to be the new head coach of BYU.

=== Utah Utes ===
The Utes had started the season with 6 straight victories, rising to as high as #3 in the Playoff rankings. However a loss to USC derailed hopes for a playoff bid and conference championship. They lost two of their next five games and finished as co-champions of the South Division. They did not play in the Conference Championship due to their loss to USC. Also, they won the previous year's Las Vegas Bowl, defeating former conference mates Colorado State 45–10.

On December 6, it was announced that the Utes were invited to the Las Vegas Bowl. This was their fifth overall Las Vegas Bowl appearance. The Utes posted a 3–1 record overall in the Las Vegas Bowl entering this game.

== Game summary ==
=== Scoring summary ===
Scoring summary

Quarter	Time	Drive			Team	Scoring information	Score	
Quarter	Time	Plays	Yards	TOP	Team	Scoring information	BYU	Utah
1	10:59	6	25	3:18	Utah	Joe Williams 1-yard touchdown run, Andy Phillips kick good	0	7
1	10:42				Utah	Interception returned 28 yards for touchdown by Tevin Carter, Andy Phillips kick good	0	14
1	9:01	1	1	0:05	Utah	Joe Williams 1-yard touchdown run, Andy Phillips kick good	0	21
1	7:29				Utah	Interception returned 28 yards for touchdown by Dominique Hatfield, Andy Phillips kick good	0	28
1	4:38	5	39	2:06	Utah	Travis Wilson 20-yard touchdown run, Andy Phillips kick good	0	35
2	0:36	13	97	4:16	BYU	Remington Peck 3-yard touchdown reception from Tanner Mangum, Trevor Samson kick good	7	35
3	10:02	12	72	3:44	BYU	Francis Bernard 10-yard touchdown run, Trevor Samson kick good	14	35
4	10:33	10	65	3:22	BYU	Nick Kurtz 5-yard touchdown reception from Tanner Mangum, Trevor Samson kick good	21	35
4	3:23	7	60	1:37	BYU	Tanner Mangum 4-yard touchdown run, Trevor Samson kick good	28	35
"TOP" = time of possession. For other American football terms, see Glossary of American football.							28	35

=== Statistics ===
Statistics	BYU	Utah
First downs	21	14
Plays–yards	81–386	63–197
Rushes–yards	71	126
Passing yards	315	71
Passing: Completions/Attempts/Interceptions	25–56–3	9–16–0
Time of possession	26:52	33:08

Team	Category	Player	Statistics
BYU	Passing	Tanner Mangum	25/56, 315 yds, 2 TD, 3 INT
BYU	Rushing	Francis Bernard	7 car, 58 yds, 1 TD
BYU	Receiving	Devon Blackmon	3 rec, 97 yds
Utah	Passing	Travis Wilson	9/16, 71 yds
Utah	Rushing	Joe Williams	25 car, 91 yds, 2 TD
Utah	Receiving	Joe Williams	2 rec, 22 yds
