= 2015 BYU Cougars football team =

American college football season

2015 BYU Cougars football

Las Vegas Bowl, L 28–35 vs. Utah
- Conference: Independent
- Record: 9–4
- Head coach: Bronco Mendenhall (11th season)
- Offensive coordinator: Robert Anae (9th season)
- Offensive scheme: Air raid
- Defensive coordinator: Nick Howell (3rd season)
- Base defense: 3–4
- Captains: Taysom Hill; Bronson Kaufusi
- Home stadium: LaVell Edwards Stadium

2015 NCAA Division I FBS independents football records
	Conf.			Overall
Team	W		L	W		L
No. 11 Notre Dame		–		10	–	3
BYU		–		9	–	4
Army		–		2	–	10
Rankings from AP Poll

The 2015 BYU Cougars football team represented Brigham Young University (BYU) in the 2015 NCAA Division I FBS football season. The Cougars, led by 11th-year head coach Bronco Mendenhall, played their home games at LaVell Edwards Stadium. This was the fifth year BYU competed as an NCAA Division I FBS independent. They finished the season 9–4. They were invited to the Las Vegas Bowl, where they lost to rival Utah.

On December 4, Mendenhall was hired as the head coach at Virginia. He stayed and coached the Cougars in the Las Vegas Bowl. He finished at BYU with an 11-year record of 99–43.

On December 19, Oregon State defensive coordinator and former BYU fullback Kalani Sitake was named BYU's new head coach.

== Before the season ==
After a season in which the entire offensive staff was changed, BYU is expected to have stability in the coaching ranks as every coach is expected to return.

=== 2015 returning missionaries ===
Name	Pos.	Height	Weight	Year	Hometown	High School
Matt Hadley	DB	6'0"	191	Sophomore	Connell, WA	Connell
Micah Hannemann	DB	6'1"	190	Sophomore	Alpine, UT	Lone Peak
Austin Hoyt	OL	6'7"	268	RS Freshman	Ione, CA	Argonaut
Moses Kaumatule	DL	6'1"	254	RS Freshman	South Jordan, UT	Bingham
Sawyer Powell	DB	6'1"	203	RS Freshman	West Richland, WA	Richland
Rhett Sandlin	LB	6'2"	220	RS Freshman	Sandy, UT	Alta
Josh Weeks	WR	6'4"	200	Freshman	Show Low, AZ	Show Low

=== 2015 departures ===
The following Cougars graduated, transferred, or chose to serve two-year church missions after the 2013 season and didn't return to the team in 2015.

== Media ==
=== Football Media Day ===
Football Media Day took place on June 24, 2015. It aired live on BYUtv, with a simulcast on ESPN3. The Media Day featured the start time and TV network of all but 2 home games. Player interviews were also conducted on byutv.org.

=== Cougar IMG Sports Network Affiliates ===
KSL 102.7 FM and 1160 AM- Flagship Station (Salt Lake City/ Provo, UT and ksl.com)
BYU Radio- Nationwide (Dish Network 980, Sirius XM 143, and byuradio.org)
KIDO- Boise, ID (football only)
KTHK- Blackfoot/ Idaho Falls/ Pocatello/ Rexburg, ID
KMGR- Manti, UT
KSUB- Cedar City, UT
KDXU- St. George, UT
KSHP- Las Vegas, NV (football only)

== Roster ==
2015 BYU Cougars football team roster
Players
Coaches
Offense

Pos.	#	Name	Class
WR	1	Akile Davis	Fr
WR	1	Moroni Laulu-Pututau	Fr
RB	2	Squally Canada	Fr
WR	3	Colby Pearson	Jr
QB	4	Taysom Hill (injured) (C)	Sr
WR	5	Nick Kurtz	Jr
WR	6	Trey Dye	So
QB	7	Beau Hoge	Fr
WR	10	Mitch Mathews	Sr
WR	11	Terenn Houk	Sr
QB	12	Tanner Mangum	Fr
QB	13	Koy Detmer Jr.	Fr
WR	13	Kurt Henderson	Sr
QB	17	McCoy Hill	So
TE	17	Colby Jorgensen	So
WR	18	Elliot Knox	Jr
WR	18	Josh Weeks	Fr
WR	19	Devon Blackmon	Sr
WR	22	Cody Stewart	So
WR	23	Rickey Shumway	Fr
RB	24	Algie Brown	Jr
RB	24	Brayden El-Bakri	Fr
WR	25	Talon Shumway	Fr
RB	26	Nate Carter	Sr
RB	28	Adam Hiné	Sr
WR	29	Zachary Saunders	Fr
RB	30	Colby Hansen	So
RB	32	Riley Burt	Fr
RB	32	Peter Welsh	Jr
RB	34	Bryan Engstrom	Fr
RB	36	Francis Bernard	Fr
RB	45	Toloa'i Ho Ching	So
OL	54	Parker Dawe	Jr
OL	55	Quin Ficklin	Fr
OL	56	Tejan Koroma	So
OL	57	LeRoy Tanoai	Fr
OL	58	Demetrius Davis	Fr
OL	60	Darren Denucci	Jr
OL	65	JJ Nwigwe	Fr
OL	67	Kyle Johnson	Jr
OL	68	Brian Rawlinson	So
OL	70	Jacob Jimenez	Fr
OL	71	Austin Hoyt	Fr
OL	72	Ryker Mathews	Sr
OL	73	Ului Lapuaho	So
OL	74	Figgs Hofheins	So
OL	75	Brad Wilcox	Jr
OL	77	Jaterrius Gulley	Fr
OL	78	Tuni Kanuch	So
WR	82	Jake Ziolkowski	Jr
WR	83	David Kessler	Jr
TE	84	Jackson Kaka	So
TE	85	Bryan Sampson	Jr
WR	86	Travis Frey	Jr
WR	87	Mitchell Juergens	Jr
TE	89	Tanner Balderree	So
TE	89	Steven Richards	Fr

Defense

Pos.	#	Name	Class
DB	1	Micah Simon	Fr
DB	2	Matt Hadley	So
LB	2	Troy Hinds	So
LB	4	Fred Warner	So
DB	5	Dayan Ghanwoloku	Fr
DB	7	Micah Hannemann	So
DB	12	Kai Nacua	Jr
DB	15	Michael Davis	Jr
LB	16	Sione Takitaki	So
DB	17	Chris Badger	Jr
DB	18	Michael Shelton	Fr
DB	19	Trevor Brent	Fr
DB	20	KJ Hall	Fr
DB	20	Jordan Preator	So
LB	21	Harvey Langi	Jr
LB	22	Manoa Pikula	Sr
DB	23	Garrett Juergens	Jr
DB	24	Zayne Anderson	Fr
DB	24	BJ Fifita	Fr
LB	25	Teu Kautai	Sr
DB	27	Morgan Unga	Fr
DB	28	Sawyer Powell	So
DB	30	Michael Wadsworth	Sr
LB	31	Sae Tautu	Jr
DB	32	Gavin Fowler	So
DB	33	Eric Takenaka	Jr
DB	34	AJ Moore	Jr
LB	35	Va'a Niumatalolo	So
LB	36	Nathan DeBeikes	Fr
DB	37	Grant Jones	So
LB	38	Butch Pau'u	Fr
LB	39	Phillip Amone	Fr
LB	41	Paul Langi	Fr
LB	41	Sam Morell	Fr
LB	41	Adam Pulsipher	Fr
LB	42	Austin Heder	Jr
LB	43	Jherremya Leuta-Douyere	Sr
DL	44	Remington Peck	Sr
LB	46	Rhett Sandlin	Fr
LB	47	Scott Huntsman	Fr
DL	48	Tomasi Laulile	Jr
DL	49	Moses Kaumatule	Fr
DL	50	Tevita Mo'Unga	Fr
LB	51	Lene Lesatele	So
LB	52	Nate Sampson	So
LB	53	Ryan Jensen	Fr
LB	53	Creed Richardson	Fr
DL	55	Felesi Tofi	Fr
LB	56	Zach Newman	So
DL	59	Roman Andrus	Fr
DL	62	Logan Taele	Jr
LB	88	Tyler Cook	Fr
DL	90	Bronson Kaufusi (C)	Sr
DL	91	Travis Tuiloma	Jr
DL	92	Graham Rowley	Sr
DL	94	Kesni Tausinga	So
DL	95	Cody Savage	Fr
DL	96	Adam Ingersoll	Jr
DL	97	Theodore King	Jr
DL	98	Maurice Maxwell	Jr

Special teams

Pos.	#	Name	Class
P	29	Rhett Almond	Fr
P	31	Jonny Linehan	So
K	27	Trevor Samson	Sr
K	33	Corey Edwards	Fr
K	84	Austin Brasher	Jr
DS	64	Matt Foley	Fr

Head coach

- Bronco Mendenhall (Oregon State)

Coordinators/assistant coaches

- Robert Anae (BYU)
  Offensive coordinator, offensive line, assistant head coach
- Mark Atuaia (BYU)
  Running backs
- Garett Tujague (BYU)
  Offensive line
- Jason Beck (BYU)
  Quarterbacks
- Guy Holliday (Cheyney)
  Outside wide receivers
- Nick Howell (Weber State)
  Secondary, defensive coorindator
- Steve Kaufusi (BYU)
  Defensive line
- Kelly Poppinga (BYU)
  Outside linebackers, special teams
- Paul Tidwell (Utah State)
  Inside linebackers
- Frank Wintrich (Kentucky Wesleyan)
  Strength & conditioning
- Justin Anderson (BYU)
  Director of player personnel
- Russell Tialavea (BYU)
  Asst. director of football operations
- Patrick Hickman (Boise State)
  Director of football operations
- JD Falslev (BYU)
  Offensive graduate assistant
- Shane Hunter (BYU)
  Defensive graduate assistant
- Jan Jorgensen (BYU)
  Defensive graduate assistant
- Kyle Visciglia (UCLA)
  Special teams graduate assistant

Legend

- (C) Team captain
- (S) Suspended
- (I) Ineligible
- Injured
- Redshirt

Roster

== Schedule ==
Date	Time	Opponent	Rank	Site	TV	Result	Attendance
September 5	1:30 p.m.	at Nebraska		Memorial Stadium; Lincoln, NE	ABC	W 33–28	89,959
September 12	8:15 p.m.	No. 20 Boise State		LaVell Edwards Stadium; Provo, UT	ESPN2	W 35–24	63,470
September 19	8:30 p.m.	at No. 10 UCLA	No. 19	Rose Bowl; Los Angeles, CA	FS1	L 23–24	67,612
September 26	10:00 a.m.	at Michigan	No. 22	Michigan Stadium; Ann Arbor, MI	ABC	L 0–31	108,940
October 2	8:15 p.m.	UConn		LaVell Edwards Stadium; Provo, UT	ESPN2	W 30–13	56,393
October 10	5:30 p.m.	East Carolina^{†}		LaVell Edwards Stadium; Provo, UT	ESPNU	W 45–38	60,186
October 16	6:00 p.m.	Cincinnati		LaVell Edwards Stadium; Provo, UT	ESPN	W 38–24	57,612
October 24	1:00 p.m.	Wagner		LaVell Edwards Stadium; Provo, UT	BYUtv	W 70–6	56,015
November 6	9:30 p.m.	at San Jose State		Spartan Stadium; San Jose, CA	CBSSN	W 17–16	15,652
November 14	5:30 p.m.	vs. Missouri		Arrowhead Stadium; Kansas City, MO	SECN	L 16–20	42,824
November 21	1:00 p.m.	Fresno State		LaVell Edwards Stadium; Provo, UT	BYUtv/ESPN3	W 52–10	57,515
November 28	1:30 p.m.	at Utah State		Maverik Stadium; Logan, UT (Beehive Boot & The Old Wagon Wheel)	CBSSN	W 51–28	22,509
December 19	1:30 p.m.	vs. No. 20 Utah		Sam Boyd Stadium; Whitney, NV (Las Vegas Bowl, Holy War & Beehive Boot)	ABC	L 28–35	42,213
^{†}Homecoming; Rankings from AP Poll / Coaches' Poll released prior to game; All times are in Mountain time

== Game summaries ==
=== Nebraska ===
BYU at Nebraska

Team	1	2	3	4	Total
• Cougars	7	17	0	9	33
Cornhuskers	14	0	14	0	28

- Date: September 5
- Location: Lincoln Memorial Stadium
  Lincoln, NE
- Game start: 2:37 p.m. CST
- Elapsed time: 3:42
- Game attendance: 89,959
- Game weather: 93 °F (34 °C), Sunny, Humidity 47%, winds SSW 15 mph
- Referee: Michael Cannon
- TV announcers (ABC/WW1): Sean McDonough, Chris Spielman, Todd McShay (ABC)
  Chuck Cooperstein, Derek Rackley (WW1)

Uniform combination: white helmet, white jersey, blue pants. BYU entered Lincoln as 6-point underdogs, with Bronco Mendenhall taking back defensive play-calling responsibilities, and with Taysom Hill looking to prove last years Heisman talk wasn't outside the box. The Cougars entered the game with 4 starters being suspended due to last years bowl game: defensive lineman Tomasi Laulile, safety Kai Nacua, wide receiver Trey Dye, and linebacker Sione Takitaki. The revamped BYU defense gave up huge amounts of passing yardage, giving up 180 yards passing in the first quarter alone. On the way they lost 3 defensive starters to injury, including nose tackle Travis Tuiloma 4–6 weeks.

Taysom Hill kept BYU in the game with his scrambling, including a 21-yard run which evened it up at 14. On the 21-yard run though, Hill came to an abrupt stop in the endzone. He was taken into the locker room, where he was diagnosed with a foot sprain of some sort. A Fred Warner fumble recovery gave BYU the ball back quickly. Freshman QB Tanner Mangum came in on BYU's next possession for 2 plays: a 9-yard run and a 9-yard pass, before Hill returned. The Cougars drove the rest of the field before Hill found Mitch Mathews for the first of his 2 receiving touchdowns.

A Hill interception in the third reversed the tide back to Nebraska. After missing 12-of-15 passes in the 2nd quarter Nebraska QB Tommy Armstrong, Jr. once again shredded the BYU D for more than 100 yards receiving in the 3rd. Hill would keep in close, driving possession after possession into Nebraska's end of the field, but the interception and a 4th down stop seemed to keep Nebraska with the momentum.

In the 4th Hill limped off the field. BYU sent him back into the locker room and sent Mangum back onto the field. Mangum went on to complete 6/10 in the 4th quarter for 102 yards, but the most memorable play came on the final possession. With only one second left Mangum scrambled right and threw the hail mary to the end zone. Mathews came all the way across the field and caught the 42-yard pass for the touchdown, ending Nebraska's 29-year home opener winning streak.

While Mangum entered the halls of Cougar lore with the touchdown pass, the news wasn't so good for BYU after the game. Hill was diagnosed with a lisfranc injury, which would be season-ending.

Scoring summary

Quarter	Time	Drive			Team	Scoring information	Score	
Quarter	Time	Plays	Yards	TOP	Team	Scoring information	BYU	NEB
1	8:10	9	88	3:47	Nebraska	Jordan Westerkamp 14-yard touchdown reception from Tommy Armstrong Jr., Drew Brown kick good	0	7
1	2:50	9	88	3:47	BYU	Taysom Hill 3-yard touchdown run, Trevor Samson kick good	7	7
1	0:16	7	65	2:34	Nebraska	Alonzo Moore 22-yard touchdown reception from Tommy Armstrong Jr., Drew Brown kick good	7	14
2	13:13	8	75	2:03	BYU	Taysom Hill 21-yard touchdown run, Trevor Samson kick good	14	14
2	5:42	11	55	4:59	BYU	42-yard field goal by Trevor Samson	17	14
2	3:48	3	22	1:13	BYU	Mitch Mathews 15-yard touchdown reception from Taysom Hill, Trevor Samson kick good	24	14
3	10:39	3	35	1:13	Nebraska	Terrell Newby 10-yard touchdown run, Drew Brown kick good	24	21
3	5:31	8	62	3:29	Nebraska	Trey Foster 9-yard touchdown reception from Tommy Armstrong Jr., Drew Brown kick good	24	28
4	7:57	9	71	4:15	BYU	35-yard field goal by Trevor Samson	27	28
4	0:00	7	76	0:48	BYU	Mitch Mathews 42-yard touchdown reception from Tanner Mangum, Trevor Samson kick not attempted	33	28
"TOP" = time of possession. For other American football terms, see Glossary of American football.							33	28

Game Stats:

- Passing: BYU- Taysom Hill 21–34–1—268, Tanner Mangum 7–11–0—111; Nebraska- Tommy Armstrong Jr. 24–41–1—319.
- Rushing: BYU- Taysom Hill 9–72, Adam Hine 4–37, Tanner Mangum 5–26, Mitch Juergens 1–7, Algernon Brown 3–1, Nate Carter 4-(−11); Nebraska- Terrell Newby 10–43, Imani Cross 7–34, Alonzo Moore 2–24, Mikale Wilcon 6–14, Brandon Reilly 1–11, Tommy Armstrong Jr. 9–2, Jamal Turner 2-(−2).
- Receiving: BYU- Nick Kurtz 5–123, Mitch Mathews 3–69, Terenn Houk 4–59, Devon Blackmon 5–43, Colby Pearson 3–28, Mitch Juergens 3–24, Moroni Laulu-Pututau 1–10, Algernon Brown 2–9, Kurt Henderson 1–8, Tyler Cook 1–6; Nebraska- Jordan Westerkamp 7–107, Brandon Reilly 5–70, Alonzo Moore 3–48, Mikale Wilbon 2–28, Jamal Turner 2–21, Stanley Morgan Jr. 2–19, Lane Hovey 2–17, Trey Foster 1–9.
- Interceptions: BYU- Micah Hanneman 1–0; Nebraska- Nate Gerry 1–43.

=== Boise State ===
Boise State at BYU

Team	1	2	3	4	Total
#20 Broncos	7	3	14	0	24
• Cougars	7	0	7	21	35

- Date: September 12
- Location: LaVell Edwards Stadium
  Provo, UT
- Game start: 8:26 p.m. MST
- Elapsed time: 3:14
- Game attendance: 63,470
- Game weather: 76 °F (24 °C), winds calm
- Referee: Cooper Castleberry
- TV announcers (ESPN2/BYUtv): Dave LaMont, Ray Bentley, Allison Williams (ESPN2)
  Dave McCann, Blaine Fowler, Lauren Francom (BYUtv)

Uniform combination: white helmet, white jersey, white pants.

Scoring summary

Quarter	Time	Drive			Team	Scoring information	Score	
Quarter	Time	Plays	Yards	TOP	Team	Scoring information	BSU	BYU
1	14:09	3	75	0:51	BYU	Mitch Juergens 84-yard touchdown reception from Tanner Mangum, Trevor Samson kick good	0	7
1	4:13	7	52	2:38	BSU	Jeremy McNichols 3-yard touchdown run, Tyler Rausa kick good	7	7
2	0:00	9	0	3:16	BSU	31-yard field goal by Tyler Rausa	10	7
3	11:01	11	75	3:59	BSU	Jeremy McNichols 3-yard touchdown run, Tyler Rausa kick good	17	7
3	4:32	6	84	3:07	BYU	Adam Hine 21-yard touchdown run, Trevor Samson kick good	17	14
3	2:03	6	86	2:23	BSU	Jeremy McNichols 29-yard touchdown reception from Ryan Finley, Tyler Rausa kick good	24	14
4	10:22	5	12	2:41	BYU	Tanner Mangum 1-yard touchdown run, Trevor Samson kick good	24	21
4	0:45	7	64	2:48	BYU	Mitch Juergens 35-yard touchdown reception from Tanner Mangum, Trevor Samson kick good	24	28
4	0:30				BYU	Interception returned 50 yards for touchdown by Kai Nacua, Trevor Samson kick good	24	35
"TOP" = time of possession. For other American football terms, see Glossary of American football.							24	35

Game Stats:

- Passing: BSU- Ryan Finley 25–38–3—297; BYU- Tanner Mangum 17–28–2—309.
- Rushing: BSU- Jeremy McNichols 15–46, Devan Demas 5–21, Finley 9–5, Shane Williams-Rhodes 1–3, Team 1-(−11); BYU- Adam Hine 19–93, Algernon Brown 5–22, Mitch Juergens 2–4, Nate Carter 2–2, Team 1-(−11), Mangum 10-(−38).
- Receiving: BSU- Williams-Rhodes 11–107, Chaz Anderson 3–66, McNichols 5–49, David Lucero 1–26, Holden Huff 1–17, Jake Roh 1–15, Thomas Sperbeck 2–13, Demas 1–4; BYU- Mitch Juergens 4–172, Devon Blackmon 6–105, Mitch Mathews 5–32, Hine 1–2, Brown 1-(−2).
- Interceptions: BSU- Donte Deayon 2–29; BYU- Kai Nacua 3–76.

=== UCLA ===
BYU at UCLA

Team	1	2	3	4	Total
#19 Cougars	7	3	7	6	23
• #10 Bruins	0	3	7	14	24

- Date: September 19
- Location: Rose Bowl
  Pasadena, CA
- Game start: 7:37 p.m. PST
- Elapsed time: 3:03
- Game attendance: 67,612
- Game weather: 85 °F (29 °C), Light Haze, Humidity 36%, winds SSE 5 mph
- Referee: Chris Coyte
- TV announcers (FS1): Joe Davis, Brady Quinn, Kris Budden

Uniform combination: white helmet, white jersey, blue pants.

Scoring summary

Quarter	Time	Drive			Team	Scoring information	Score	
Quarter	Time	Plays	Yards	TOP	Team	Scoring information	BYU	UCLA
1	9:39	11	71	4:06	BYU	Adam Hine 7-yard touchdown run, Trevor Samson kick good	7	0
2	13:38	7	57	1:45	UCLA	35-yard field goal by Kaʻimi Fairbairn	7	3
2	9:18	6	14	1:54	BYU	40-yard field goal by Trevor Samson	10	3
3	9:27	5	17	1:55	UCLA	Paul Perkins 5-yard touchdown run, Kaʻimi Fairbairn kick good	10	10
3	6:26	7	75	3:01	BYU	Mitch Mathews 14-yard touchdown reception from Tanner Mangum, Trevor Samson kick good	17	10
4	13:41	11	62	4:29	BYU	45-yard field goal by Trevor Samson	20	10
4	12:16	5	68	1:20	UCLA	Jordan Payton 19-yard touchdown reception from Josh Rosen, Kaʻimi Fairbairn kick good	20	17
4	5:39	16	61	6:37	BYU	32-yard field goal by Trevor Samson	23	17
4	3:21	7	80	2:18	UCLA	Nate Starks 3-yard touchdown run, Kaʻimi Fairbairn kick good	23	24
"TOP" = time of possession. For other American football terms, see Glossary of American football.							23	24

Game Stats:

- Passing: BYU- Tanner Mangum 30–47–1—244; UCLA- Josh Rosen 11–23–3—106.
- Rushing: BYU- Adam Hine 23–149, Nate Carter 7–22, Harvey Langi 2–8, Trey Dye 1–1, Tanner Mangum 8-(−19); UCLA- Paul Perkins 26–219, Nate Starks 7–81, Soso Jamabo 2-(−1), Team 3-(−3).
- Receiving: BYU- Mitch Mathews 9–84, Mitch Juergens 5–42, Nick Kurtz 4–38, Terenn Houk 4–37, Devon Blackmon 3–23, Colby Pearson 2–8, Hine 2–8, Mangum 1–4; UCLA- Jordan Payton 4–59, Thomas Duarte 3–33, Mossi Johnson 2–8, Kenneth Walker 1–4, Jamabo 1–2.
- Interceptions: BYU- Langi 2–21, Kai Nacua 1–0; UCLA- Myles Jack 1–3.

=== Michigan ===
BYU at Michigan

Team	1	2	3	4	Total
#22 Cougars	0	0	0	0	0
• Wolverines	7	24	0	0	31

- Date: September 26
- Location: Michigan Stadium
  Ann Arbor, MI
- Game start: 12:05 p.m. EST
- Elapsed time: 3:08
- Game attendance: 108,940
- Game weather: 70 °F (21 °C), Partly Cloudy, winds NE 10–15 mph
- Referee: Mike Cannon
- TV announcers (ABC): Sean McDonough, Chris Spielman, Todd McShay

Uniform combination: white helmet, white jersey, blue pants.

Scoring summary

Quarter	Time	Drive			Team	Scoring information	Score	
Quarter	Time	Plays	Yards	TOP	Team	Scoring information	BYU	MICH
1	6:52	10	80	4:42	MICH	Jake Rudock 3-yard touchdown run, Kenny Allen kick good	0	7
2	13:37	10	90	4:19	MICH	Amara Darboh 4-yard touchdown reception from Jake Rudock, Kenny Allen kick good	0	14
2	11:37	2	68	0:52	MICH	De'Veon Smith 3-yard touchdown run, Kenny Allen kick good	0	21
2	6:57	6	59	3:26	MICH	Jake Rudock 17-yard touchdown run, Kenny Allen kick good	0	28
2	1:02	10	47	5:04	MICH	40-yard field goal by Kenny Allen	0	31
"TOP" = time of possession. For other American football terms, see Glossary of American football.							0	31

Game Stats:

- Passing: BYU- Tanner Mangum 12–28–0—55; MICH- Jake Rudock 14–25–0—194.
- Rushing: BYU- Adam Hine 8–33, Franci Bernard 4–30, Nate Carter 3–9, Team 1-(−4), Mangum 6-(−18); MICH- De'Veon Smith 16–125, Rudock 10–33, Derrick Green 10–28, Drake Johnson 5–26, Sione Houma 4–17, Blake O'Neill 1–9, Ty Isaac 2–9, Ross Douglas 3–7.
- Receiving: BYU- Devon Blackmon 1–14, Colby Pearson 2–11, Nick Kurtz 2–10, Mitch Juergens 2–6, Hine 1–5, Mitch Mathews 1–4, Carter 1–4, Teremm Houk 1–3, M Laulu-Pututau 1-(−2); MICH- Amara Darboh 4–57, Jake Butt 1–41, Khalid Hill 2–39, Jehu Chesson 2–17, Drake Johnson 1–14, Ian Bunting 1–10, Green 1–7, AJ Williams 1–7, Henry Poggi 1–2.

=== UConn ===
UConn at BYU

Team	1	2	3	4	Total
Huskies	0	7	3	3	13
• Cougars	7	0	3	20	30

- Date: October 2
- Location: LaVell Edwards Stadium
  Provo, UT
- Game start: 8:21 p.m. MST
- Elapsed time: 3:16
- Game attendance: 56,393
- Game weather: 56 °F (13 °C), Cloudy, winds WNW 4 mph
- Referee: Scott Campbell
- TV announcers (ESPN2/BYUtv): Eamon McAnaney, Rocky Boiman (ESPN2)
  Dave McCann, Blaine Fowler, Lauren Francom (BYUtv)

Uniform combination: white helmet, blue jersey, white pants.

Scoring summary

Quarter	Time	Drive			Team	Scoring information	Score	
Quarter	Time	Plays	Yards	TOP	Team	Scoring information	UConn	BYU
1	2:44	12	87	5:18	BYU	Francis Bernard 1-yard touchdown run, Trevor Samson kick good	0	7
2	1:42	6	80	2:12	UConn	Arkeel Newsome 30-yard touchdown reception from Bryant Shirreffs, Bobby Puyol kick good	7	7
3	7:11	8	16	4:16	UConn	37-yard field goal by Bobby Puyol	10	7
3	3:02	11	63	4:01	BYU	26-yard field goal by Trevor Samson	10	10
4	13:24	11	34	3:27	BYU	25-yard field goal by Trevor Samson	10	13
4	12:03	1	21	0:08	BYU	Mitch Mathews 21-yard touchdown reception from Tanner Mangum, Trevor Samson kick good	10	20
4	8:59	9	55	2:55	UConn	42-yard field goal by Bobby Puyol	13	20
4	7:26	6	41	1:31	BYU	Mitch Mathews 6-yard touchdown reception from Tanner Mangum, Trevor Samson kick good	13	27
4	0:26	9	51	4:21	BYU	32-yard field goal by Trevor Samson	13	30
"TOP" = time of possession. For other American football terms, see Glossary of American football.							13	30

Game Stats:

- Passing: UConn- Bryant Shirreffs 14–28–2—168; BYU- Tanner Mangum 35–53–2—265, Team 0–1–0—0.
- Rushing: UConn- Arkee Newsome 13–68, Max Delorenzo 1–2, Ron Johnson 1-(−3), Shirreffs 12-(−5); BYU- Algernon Brown 18–95, Francis Bernard 11–69, Nate Carter 8–14, Riley Burt 1–5, Mangum 3-(−9).
- Receiving: UConn- Newsome 4–63, Tommy Myers 2–35, Tyraiq Beals 3–33, Delorenzo 3–24, Noel Thomas 2–13; BYU- Terenn Houk 6–129, Mitch Mathews 8–78, Mitch Juergens 10–74, Nick Kurtz 5–52, Devon Blackmon 3–15, Carter 1–7, Brown 1–6, Trey Dye 1–4.
- Interceptions: UConn- Jamar Summers 1–26, Jhavon Williams 1–0; BYU- Bronson Kaufusi 1–10, Michael Shelton 1–4.

=== East Carolina ===
East Carolina at BYU

Team	1	2	3	4	Total
Pirates	14	7	0	17	38
• Cougars	7	21	10	7	45

- Date: October 10
- Location: LaVell Edwards Stadium
  Provo, UT
- Game start: 5:32 p.m. MST
- Elapsed time: 3:31
- Game attendance: 60,186
- Game weather: 82 °F (28 °C), Sunny, winds light
- Referee: Adam Savoie
- TV announcers (ESPNU/BYUtv): Allen Bestwick, Dan Hawkins (ESPNU)
  Dave McCann, Blaine Fowler, Lauren Francom (BYUtv)

Uniform combination: white helmet with royal blue decals and royal blue chromium facemasks, royal blue jersey, white pants.

Scoring summary

Quarter	Time	Drive			Team	Scoring information	Score	
Quarter	Time	Plays	Yards	TOP	Team	Scoring information	ECU	BYU
1	7:21	7	69	2:51	ECU	James Summers 34-yard touchdown run, Davis Plowman kick good	7	0
1	5:35				ECU	Yiannis Bowden recovers blocked punt in end zone for touchdown, Davis Plowman kick good	14	0
1	1:36	10	75	3:59	BYU	Algernon Brown 22-yard touchdown run, Trevor Samson kick good	14	7
2	13:20	3	1	0:55	BYU	Algernon Brown 1-yard touchdown run, Trevor Samson kick good	14	14
2	8:05	10	68	3:45	BYU	Mitch Mathews 13-yard touchdown reception from Tanner Mangum, Trevor Samson kick good	14	21
2	2:14	7	87	3:04	BYU	Terenn Houk 9-yard touchdown reception from Tanner Mangum, Trevor Samson kick good	14	28
2	0:06	9	77	2:01	ECU	Trevon Brown 1-yard touchdown reception from Blake Kemp, Davis Plowman kick good	21	28
3	13:02	5	75	1:58	BYU	Algernon Brown 53-yard touchdown run, Trevor Samson kick good	21	35
3	2:25	9	50	3:15	BYU	37-yard field goal by Trevor Samson	21	38
4	12:48	6	85	1:52	ECU	Chris Hairston 2-yard touchdown run, Davis Plowman kick good	28	38
4	6:02	6	63	2:26	ECU	Isaiah Jones 7-yard touchdown reception from Blake Kemp, Davis Plowman kick good	35	38
4	4:01	5	27	1:05	ECU	34-yard field goal by Davis Plowman	38	38
4	0:19	10	75	3:42	BYU	Algernon Brown 9-yard touchdown run, Trevor Samson kick good	38	45
"TOP" = time of possession. For other American football terms, see Glossary of American football.							38	45

Game Stats:

- Passing: ECU: Blake Kemp 28–36–1—371, James Summers 2–6–0—14; BYU: Tanner Mangum 24–33–0—332, Beau Hoge 1–5–1—9.
- Rushing: ECU: Chris Hairston 15–77, Summers 10–55, Shawn Furlow 3–4, Kemp 4-(−3); BYU: Algernon Brown 24–134, Francis Bernard 8–30, Jonny Linehan 1–7, Trey Dye 1–5, Riley Burt 1–4, Hoge 3-(−3), Mangum 5-(−10).
- Receiving: ECU: Isaiah Jones 10–97, Bryce Williams 5–87, Trevon Brown 6–84, Davon Grayson 5–53, Chris Hairston 3–50, Daquan Barnes 1–8, Anthony Scott 0–5, Christian Matau 0–3; BYU: Devon Blackmon 9–142, Mitch Mathews 4–72, Terenn Houk 4–43, Brown 2–20, Mitch Juergens 1–17, Colby Pearson 2–16, Nick Kurtz 1–12, Kurt Henderson 1–11, Trey Dye 1–8.
- Interceptions: ECU: Yiannis Bowden 1–7; BYU: Fred Warner 1–0.

=== Cincinnati ===
Cincinnati at BYU

Team	1	2	3	4	Total
Bearcats	10	7	7	0	24
• Cougars	0	10	7	21	38

- Date: October 16
- Location: LaVell Edwards Stadium
  Provo, UT
- Game start: 6:01 p.m. MST
- Elapsed time: 3:24
- Game attendance: 57,612
- Game weather: 73 °F (23 °C), Mostly Sunny, winds none
- Referee: Tracy Jones
- TV announcers (ESPN/BYUtv): Adam Amin, Kelly Stouffer, Olivia Harlan (ESPN)
  Dave McCann, Blaine Fowler, Lauren Francom (BYUtv)

Uniform combination: white helmet, blue jersey, white pants.

Scoring summary

Quarter	Time	Drive			Team	Scoring information	Score	
Quarter	Time	Plays	Yards	TOP	Team	Scoring information	CIN	BYU
1	11:48	10	63	3:12	CIN	29-yard field goal by Andrew Gantz	3	0
1	4:54	15	92	5:41	CIN	DJ Dowdy 1-yard touchdown reception from Tion Green, Andrew Gantz kick good	10	0
2	13:29	5	43	1:23	BYU	29-yard field goal by Trevor Samson	10	3
2	6:50	7	20	3:12	CIN	Mike Boone 5-yard touchdown run, Andrew Gantz kick good	17	3
2	4:30	5	76	2:13	BYU	Algernon Brown 5-yard touchdown run, Trevor Samson kick good	17	10
3	9:31	12	78	5:22	BYU	Nick Kurtz 19-yard touchdown reception from Tanner Mangum, Trevor Samson kick good	17	17
3	3:28	8	64	3:10	CIN	DJ Dowdy 2-yard touchdown run, Andrew Gantz kick good	24	17
4	10:24	6	61	2:26	BYU	Algernon Brown 2-yard touchdown run, Trevor Samson kick good	24	24
4	8:14	1	53	0:09	BYU	Nick Kurtz 53-yard touchdown reception from Tanner Mangum, Trevor Samson kick good	24	31
4	4:35	4	32	2:01	BYU	Francis Bernard 11-yard touchdown run, Trevor Samson kick good	24	38
"TOP" = time of possession. For other American football terms, see Glossary of American football.							24	38

Game Stats:

- Passing: CIN: Hayden Moore 15–30–0—219, Tion Green 1–1–0—1; BYU: Tanner Mangum 19–32–1—252.
- Rushing: CIN: Mike Boone 9–53, Tion Green 9–30, Hosey Williams 8–29, Moore 20–9; BYU: Algernon Brown 20–88, Francis Bernard 4–60, Riley Burt 2–48, Nate Carter 2–5, Trey Dye 1-(−4).
- Receiving: CIN: Shaq Washington 5–103, Alex Chisum 2–45, Max Morrison 4–31, Mike Boone 3–25, Nate Cole 1–15, DJ Dowdy 1–1; BYU: Nick Kurtz 6–119, Mitch Mathews 3–54, Devon Blackmon 3–32, Colby Pearson 2–21, Terenn Houk 1–10, Bernard 2–7, Brown 1–5, Mitch Juergens 1–4.
- Interceptions: CIN: Kevin Brown 1–0.

=== Wagner ===
Wagner at BYU

Team	1	2	3	4	Total
Seahawks	0	0	6	0	6
• Cougars	28	21	14	7	70

- Date: October 24
- Location: LaVell Edwards Stadium
  Provo, UT
- Game start: 1:05 p.m. MST
- Elapsed time: 2:58
- Game attendance: 56,015
- Game weather: 57 °F (14 °C), Clear & Sunny, winds calm
- Referee: Dan Romeo
- TV announcers (BYUtv): Dave McCann, Blaine Fowler, Lauren Francom

Uniform combination: white helmet, blue jersey, white pants.

Scoring summary

Quarter	Time	Drive			Team	Scoring information	Score	
Quarter	Time	Plays	Yards	TOP	Team	Scoring information	WAG	BYU
1	13:47	4	75	1:13	BYU	Colby Pearson 16-yard touchdown reception from Tanner Mangum, Trevor Samson kick good	0	7
1	11:28	3	48	0:46	BYU	Mitch Mathews 20-yard touchdown reception from Tanner Mangum, Trevor Samson kick good	0	14
1	7:52	4	66	1:03	BYU	Algernon Brown 42-yard touchdown run, Trevor Samson kick good	0	21
1	3:35	6	72	2:34	BYU	Algernon Brown 37-yard touchdown run, Trevor Samson kick good	0	28
2	13:07	5	86	1:53	BYU	Mitch Mathews 19-yard touchdown reception from Tanner Mangum, Trevor Samson kick good	0	35
2	9:49	4	50	1:28	BYU	Francis Bernard 1-yard touchdown run, Trevor Samson kick good	0	42
2	4:17	10	40	4:03	BYU	Beau Hoge 2-yard touchdown run, Trevor Samson kick good	0	49
3	6:52	15	70	8:08	WAG	Matthias McKinnon 1-yard touchdown run, Bryan Maley kick blocked	6	49
3	3:23	7	80	3:20	BYU	David Kessler 47-yard touchdown reception from Beau Hoge, Trevor Samson kick good	6	56
3	0:55	2	76	0:59	BYU	Nate Carter 70-yard touchdown run, Trevor Samson kick good	6	63
4	8:07	12	77	5:42	BYU	Beau Hoge 1-yard touchdown run, Trevor Samson kick good	6	70
"TOP" = time of possession. For other American football terms, see Glossary of American football.							6	70

Game Stats:

- Passing: WAG: Alex Thomson 7–12–1—43, Chris Andrews 1–4–0—3; BYU: Tanner Mangum 12–13–0—237, Beau Hoge 8–11–0—117, Koy Detmer Jr. 3–3–0—57.
- Rushing: WAG: Thomson 8–28, Otis Wright 12–25, Denzel Knight 12–15, Matthias McKinnon 6–12, Andrews 5-(−1); BYU: Algernon Brown 6–109, Nate Carter 10–102, Francis Bernard 6–54, Hoge 12–47, Colby Hansen 5–17, Toloa Ho Ching 2–10, Detmer Jr. 1-(−9).
- Receiving: WAG: Ryan Owens 2–28, Calee Scepaniak 2–6, Andre Yevchinecz 2–4, Anthony Carrington 1–5, Lloyd Smith 1–3; BYU: David Kessler 3–78, Terenn Houk 2–65, Trey Dye 2–55, Mitch Juergens 2–52, Mitch Mathews 3–44, Devon Blackmon 2–26, Josh Weeks 3–23, Jake Ziolkowski 2–20, Colby Pearson 1–16, Nick Kurtz 1–14, Akile Davis 1–9, Moroni Laulu-Pututau 1–9.
- Interceptions: BYU: Jordan Praetor 1–3.

=== San Jose State ===
BYU at San Jose State

Team	1	2	3	4	Total
• Cougars	7	7	0	3	17
Spartans	3	7	0	6	16

- Date: November 6
- Location: Spartan Stadium
  San Jose, CA
- Game start: 8:40 PST
- Elapsed time: 3:06
- Game attendance: 15,652
- Game weather: 57 °F (14 °C), Clear and cool, winds light
- Referee: Brandon Cruse
- TV announcers (CBSSN): Rich Waltz, Adam Archuleta, Cassie Gallo

Uniform combination: white helmet, white jersey, blue pants.

Scoring summary

Quarter	Time	Drive			Team	Scoring information	Score	
Quarter	Time	Plays	Yards	TOP	Team	Scoring information	BYU	SJSU
1	10:07	10	59	4:53	SJSU	31-yard field goal by Austin Lopez	0	3
1	6:09	10	75	3:58	BYU	Mitch Mathews 4-yard touchdown reception from Tanner Mangum, Trevor Samson kick good	7	3
2	10:12	17	80	5:45	BYU	Algernon Brown 5-yard touchdown run, Trevor Samson kick good	14	3
2	0:21				SJSU	Interception returned 61 yards for touchdown by Cleveland Wallace, Austin Lopez kick good	14	10
4	11:21	10	69	4:49	BYU	31-yard field goal by Trevor Samson	17	10
4	0:45	10	85	4:20	SJSU	Kenny Potter 6-yard touchdown run, 2-point pass incomplete	17	16
"TOP" = time of possession. For other American football terms, see Glossary of American football.							17	16

Game Stats:

- Passing: BYU: Tanner Mangum 23–37–1—293; SJSU: Kenny Potter 18–25–0—147, Tim Crawley 0–1–0—0.
- Rushing: BYU: Algernon Brown 12–41, Adam Hiné 3–9, Francis Bernard 2–5, TEAM 4-(−9), Mangum 4-(−10); SJSU: Tyler Ervin 23–80, Kenny Potter 12–20, Hansell Wilson 1–15, Thomas Tucker 2–7.
- Receiving: BYU: Devon Blackmon 6–102, Mitch Mathews 4–62, Nick Kurtz 3–33, Bernard 3–33, Terenn Houk 4–32, Remington Peck 1–18, Colby Pearson 1–8, Brown 1–5; SJSU: Billy Freeman 6–67, Shane Smith 2–17, Crawley 2–14, Ervin 4–13, Thomas Tucker 1–13, Hansell Wilson 1–11, Justin Holmes 1–6, Josh Oliver 1–6.
- Interceptions: SJSU: Cleveland Wallace 1–61.

=== Missouri ===
BYU vs. Missouri

Team	1	2	3	4	Total
Cougars	0	3	7	6	16
• Tigers	3	3	0	14	20

- Date: November 14
- Location: Arrowhead Stadium
  Kansas City, MO
- Game start: 6:39 p.m. CST
- Elapsed time: 3:25
- Game attendance: 42,824
- Game weather: 57 °F (14 °C), Clear, winds SSW 15 mph
- Referee: Alan Eck
- TV announcers (SEC): Brent Musburger, Jesse Palmer, Maria Taylor

Uniform combination: white helmet, blue jersey, white pants.

Scoring summary

Quarter	Time	Drive			Team	Scoring information	Score	
Quarter	Time	Plays	Yards	TOP	Team	Scoring information	BYU	MIZ
1	0:56	12	68	5:22	MIZ	23-yard field goal by Andrew Baggett	0	3
2	7:29	9	75	3:33	BYU	23-yard field goal by Trevor Samson	3	3
2	0:54	18	65	6:29	MIZ	34-yard field goal by Andrew Baggett	3	6
3	6:21	7	41	3:28	BYU	Algernon Brown 11-yard touchdown run, Trevor Samson kick good	10	6
4	13:03	13	79	8:09	MIZ	J'Mon Moore 4-yard touchdown reception from Drew Lock, Andrew Baggett kick good	10	13
4	10:03	6	16	2:46	MIZ	Tyler Hunt 1-yard touchdown run, Andrew Baggett kick good	10	20
4	7:19	10	72	2:35	BYU	Francis Bernard 6-yard touchdown reception from Tanner Mangum, Trevor Samson kick failed	16	20
"TOP" = time of possession. For other American football terms, see Glossary of American football.							16	20

Game Stats:

- Passing: BYU: Tanner Mangum 23–41–0—244; MIZ: Drew Lock 19–28–1—244.
- Rushing: BYU: Algernon Brown 7–42, Adam Hine 6–7, Francis Bernard 1–3, Tanner Mangum 1-(−6); MIZ: Russell Hansbrough 26–117, Ish Witter 13–34, Lock 3–26, Tyler Hunt 10–14, Ray Wingo 1–1, Team 2-(−2).
- Receiving: BYU: Nick Kurtz 3–67, Bernard 4–56, Remington Peck 3–41, Colby Pearson 4–40, Mitch Mathews 4–20, Devon Blackmon 2–15, Mitch Jurgens 1–4, Brown 2–1; MIZ: Nate Brown 5–65, Witter 2–57, J'Mon Moore 3–49, Cam Hilton 3–36, Sean Culkin 1–16, Jason Reese 1–11, Wesley Leftwich 2–9, Hunt 1–2, Emanuel Hall 1-(−1).
- Interceptions: BYU: Micah Hanneman 1–29.

=== Fresno State ===
Fresno State at BYU

Team	1	2	3	4	Total
Bulldogs	3	0	0	7	10
• Cougars	3	21	14	14	52

- Date: November 21
- Location: LaVell Edwards Stadium
  Provo, UT
- Game start: 1:05 p.m. MST
- Elapsed time: 3:30
- Game attendance: 57,515
- Game weather: 57 °F (14 °C), Clear, winds SSW 15 mph
- Referee: Kevin Mar
- TV announcers (BYUtv/ESPN3): Dave McCann, Blaine Fowler, Lauren Francom

Uniform combination: white helmet, blue jersey, white pants.

Scoring summary

Quarter	Time	Drive			Team	Scoring information	Score	
Quarter	Time	Plays	Yards	TOP	Team	Scoring information	FSU	BYU
1	5:11	7	13	2:33	FSU	28-yard field goal by Kody Kroening	3	0
1	1:42	11	57	3:24	BYU	40-yard field goal by Trevor Samson	3	3
2	13:25	5	59	1:36	BYU	Francis Bernard 1-yard touchdown run, Trevor Samson kick good	3	10
2	7:21				BYU	Interception returned 32 yards for touchdown by Kai Nacua, Trevor Samson kick failed	3	16
2	6:11	1	18	0:05	BYU	Moroni Laulu-Pututau 18-yard touchdown reception from Tanner Mangum, 2-point pass to Terenn Houk good	3	24
3	9:59	9	59	3:57	BYU	Francis Bernard 1-yard touchdown run, Trevor Samson kick good	3	31
3	5:06	6	95	1:54	BYU	Algernon Brown 45-yard touchdown run, Trevor Samson kick good	3	38
4	14:52	4	87	1:43	BYU	Terenn Houk 15-yard touchdown reception from Remington Peck, Trevor Samson kick good	3	45
4	12:22	4	23	1:30	BYU	Nate Carter 5-yard touchdown run, Trevor Samson kick good	3	52
4	8:42	7	77	3:34	FSU	Kilto Anderson 29-yard touchdown run, Kody Kroening kick good	10	52
"TOP" = time of possession. For other American football terms, see Glossary of American football.							10	52

Game Stats:

- Passing: FSU: Zack Greenlee 14–41–3—125, Kilto Anderson 4–7–0—65; BYU: Tanner Mangum 24–37–0—336, Remington Peck 1–1–0—15, Beau Hoge 1–1–0—11.
- Rushing: FSU: Marteze Waller 18–47, Kilto Anderson 1–29, Dejonte O'Neal 3–14, Dustin Garrison 3–12, Greenlee 5-(−17); BYU: Algernon Brown 11–97, Riley Burt 10–29, Mangum 4–14, Francis Bernard 6–8, Nate Carter 1–5, Hoge 1–5, Jonny Linehan 1–0.
- Receiving: FSU: Jamire Jordan 8–54, Justin Johnson 3–45, Stratton Brown 1–43, KeeSea Johnson 2–27, Delvo Hardaway 1–10, Da'Mari Scott 1–6, Marteze Waller 2–5; BYU: Moroni Laulu-Pututau 3–95, Colby Pearson 4–55, Mitch Mathews 2–52, Terenn Houk 5–44, Nick Kurtz 4–41, Bernard 4–37, Devon Blackmon 2–20, Mitch Juergens 1–12, Remington Peck 1–6.
- Interceptions: BYU: Kai Nacua 2–61, Fred Warner 1–27.

=== Utah State ===
BYU at Utah State

Team	1	2	3	4	Total
• Cougars	10	14	14	13	51
Aggies	7	14	0	7	28

- Date: November 28
- Location: Maverik Stadium
  Logan, UT
- Game start: 1:35 MST
- Elapsed time: 3:52
- Game attendance: 22,509
- Game weather: 25 °F (−4 °C), Partly cloudy w/ snow flurries, No wind
- Referee: Eddy Shelton
- TV announcers (CBSSN): Rich Waltz, Adam Archuleta, Cassie Gallo

Uniform combination: white helmet, white jersey, white pants.

Scoring summary

Quarter	Time	Drive			Team	Scoring information	Score	
Quarter	Time	Plays	Yards	TOP	Team	Scoring information	BYU	USU
1	12:52	6	75	2:08	USU	Chuckie Keeton 52-yard touchdown run, Jake Thompson kick good	0	7
1	10:08	7	75	2:44	BYU	Algernon Brown 8-yard touchdown run, Trevor Samson kick good	7	7
1	0:29	10	45	4:15	BYU	41-yard field goal by Trevor Samson	10	7
2	7:05	8	59	3:16	USU	LaJuan Hunt 6-yard touchdown run, Jake Thompson kick good	10	14
2	3:00	7	58	2:23	USU	Hunter Sharp 24-yard touchdown reception from Chuckie Keeton, Jake Thompson kick good	10	21
2	2:42	1	72	0:11	BYU	Mitch Mathews 72-yard touchdown reception from Tanner Mangum, Trevor Samson kick good	17	21
2	0:00				BYU	Tomasi Laulile 37 yard fumble returned for touchdown, Trevor Samson kick good	24	21
3	13:40	3	62	1:11	BYU	Mitch Mathews 35-yard touchdown reception from Tanner Mangum, Trevor Samson kick good	31	21
3	3:01	1	10	0:07	BYU	Francis Bernard 10-yard touchdown run, Trevor Samson kick good	38	21
4	14:48	8	86	3:06	USU	Nick Vigil 2-yard touchdown run, Brock Warren kick good	38	28
4	12:06	8	90	2:36	BYU	Francis Bernard 4-yard touchdown reception from Tanner Mangum, Trevor Samson kick failed	44	28
4	3:02	4	26	2:10	BYU	Algernon Brown 18-yard touchdown reception from Tanner Mangum, Trevor Samson kick good	51	28
"TOP" = time of possession. For other American football terms, see Glossary of American football.							51	28

Game Stats:

- Passing: BYU: Tanner Mangum 16–30–0—284; USU: Chuckie Keeton 20–45–0—243.
- Rushing: BYU: Algernon Brown 16–68, Francis Bernard 3–17, Harvey Langi 3–15, Adam Hine 1-(−2), Team 3-(−6), Mangum 5-(−18); USU: Devante Mays 19–54, Keeton 9–54, Lajuan Hunt 8–50, Tonny Lindsey 2–24, DJ Nelson 1–13, Nick Vigil 2–5, Hunter Sharp 1–2, Devon Robinson 1–0.
- Receiving: BYU: Mitch Mathews 6–158, Kurt Henderson 2–39, Devon Blackmon 1–35, Brown 1–18, Nick Kurtz 1–13, Colby Pearson 1–7, Remington Peck 1–7, Bernard 2–4, Mitch Juergens 1–3; USU: Hunter Sharp 7–100, Andre Rodriguez 4–78, Tyler Fox 1–25, Wyatt Houston 2–24, Kenne Williams 1–13, Brand Swindall 1–11, Braelon Roberts 1–9, Jake Simonich 1-(−5), Lajuan Hunt 2-(−12).
- Utah State 0–3 on Field Goals. Bronson Kaufusi blocks 2 FG's for BYU.

=== Las Vegas Bowl ===
BYU vs. Utah

Team	1	2	3	4	Total
Cougars	0	7	7	14	28
• #20 Utes	35	0	0	0	35

- Date: December 19
- Location: Whitney, NV
- Game start: 12:45 p.m. PST
- Elapsed time: 3:40
- Game attendance: 42,213
- Game weather: 54 °F (12 °C), Sunny, Wind ESE 3 mph
- Referee: Mark Klucynnski
- TV announcers (ABC/Sports USA): Brent Musburger, Jesse Palmer, Maria Taylor (ABC)
  Mike Morgan, Gary Barnett, Jonathan Von Tobel (Sports USA)

Uniform combination: white helmet with royal blue decals and royal blue chromium facemasks, royal blue jersey, white pants. This was the final game for head coach Bronco Mendenhall, who accepted the same position with the Virginia Cavaliers on December 4, and for assistant coaches Robert Anae, Garett Tujague, Mark Atuaia, Jason Beck, Nick Howell, and Kelly Poppinga who accepted coaching responsibilities for the same positions at Virginia on December 9 & 10.

Scoring summary

Quarter	Time	Drive			Team	Scoring information	Score	
Quarter	Time	Plays	Yards	TOP	Team	Scoring information	BYU	Utah
1	10:59	6	25	3:18	Utah	Joe Williams 1-yard touchdown run, Andy Phillips kick good	0	7
1	10:42				Utah	Interception returned 28 yards for touchdown by Tevin Carter, Andy Phillips kick good	0	14
1	9:01	1	1	0:05	Utah	Joe Williams 1-yard touchdown run, Andy Phillips kick good	0	21
1	7:29				Utah	Interception returned 28 yards for touchdown by Dominique Hatfield, Andy Phillips kick good	0	28
1	4:38	5	39	2:06	Utah	Travis Wilson 20-yard touchdown run, Andy Phillips kick good	0	35
2	0:36	13	97	4:16	BYU	Remington Peck 3-yard touchdown reception from Tanner Mangum, Trevor Samson kick good	7	35
3	10:02	12	72	3:44	BYU	Francis Bernard 10-yard touchdown run, Trevor Samson kick good	14	35
4	10:33	10	65	3:22	BYU	Nick Kurtz 5-yard touchdown reception from Tanner Mangum, Trevor Samson kick good	21	35
4	3:23	7	60	1:37	BYU	Tanner Mangum 4-yard touchdown run, Trevor Samson kick good	28	35
"TOP" = time of possession. For other American football terms, see Glossary of American football.							28	35

Game Stats:

- Passing: BYU: Tanner Mangum 25–56–3—315; Utah: Travis Wilson 9–16–0—71.
- Rushing: BYU: Francis Bernard 7–58, Algernon Brown 5–12, Mangum 11–3, Squally Canada 1–1, Trey Dye 1-(−3); Utah: Joe Williams 25–91, Wilson 15–23, Tom Hackt 1–21, Bubba Poole 1–0, Britain Covey 1-(−1), Team 3-(−3), Kendal Thompson 1-(−5).
- Receiving: BYU: Devon Blacmkmon 3–97, Terenn Houk 6–68, Nick Kurtz 4–56, Mitch Juergens 5–55, Bernard 2–19, Brown 2–9, Mitch Mathews 2–8, Remington Peck 1–3; Utah: Williams 2–22, Harris Handley 2–16, Tyrone Smith 1–15, Kenneth Scott 1–9, Thompson 1–8, Covey 2–1.
- Interceptions: Utah: Tevin Carter 2–61, Dominique Hatfield 1–46.

After the game was completed, Tom Holmoe took time during the post-game press conference to announce that Kalani Sitake would become the BYU head coach beginning with the 2016 season.

== Rankings ==
Ranking movements Legend: ██ Increase in ranking ██ Decrease in ranking — = Not ranked RV = Received votes
	Week																
Poll	Pre	1	2	3	4	5	6	7	8	9	10	11	12	13	14	15	Final
AP	RV	RV	19	22	RV	RV	RV	RV	RV	RV	RV	—	RV	RV	RV	RV	RV
Coaches	RV	RV	22	RV	RV	—	—	RV	RV	RV	RV	RV	RV	RV	RV	RV	—
CFP	Not released									—	—	—	—	—	—	—	Not released
