= Nick Howell =

Nick Howell may refer to:

- Nick Howell (American football) (born 1980), American college football coach
- Nick Howell (real tennis) (born 1986), Australian real tennis player
