= Gary Kapp =

American football player (1937–2023)

- Kapp, 1959

Profile
- Position: End

Personal information
- Born: March 11, 1937; Ogden, Utah, U.S.
- Died: July 15, 2023 (aged 86)
- Listed weight: 181 lb (82 kg)

Career information
- College: Utah State (1956–1958)

Gary Christian Kapp (March 11, 1937 – July 15, 2023) was an American football end.

Kapp was born and raised in Ogden, Utah. He attended Ogden's Ben Lomond High School, playing football, basketball and baseball.

Kapp played college football for the Utah State Aggies from 1956 to 1958. As a junior in 1957, he ranked second among the pass receivers in major-college football with 45 receptions for 635 yards. At the end of the 1957 season, Kapp was selected by both the Associated Press and United Press as a firat-team player on their Skyline Conference all-conference football teams. He was also selected by the International News Service as a second-team player on the 1957 All-America college football team.

Kapp missed most of the 1958 season after a series of misfortunes, including breaking a foot in an industrial accident in June, hepatitis, the death of his other during the summer, and a knee injury in the season opener against Arizona.

Kapp reeived a degree in education. He became a teacher and coach in the Ogden schools. He later worked at Hill Air Force Base for 24 years. He died in 2023 at age 86.
