= 2015 Utah Utes football team =

American college football season

2015 Utah Utes football

Pac-12 South Division co-champion Las Vegas Bowl champion

Las Vegas Bowl, W 35–28 vs. BYU
- Conference: Pac-12 Conference
- South Division

Ranking
- Coaches: No. 16
- AP: No. 17
- Record: 10–3 (6–3 Pac-12)
- Head coach: Kyle Whittingham (11th season)
- Co-offensive coordinators: Aaron Roderick (2nd season); Jim Harding (1st season)
- Offensive scheme: Multiple
- Defensive coordinator: John Pease (1st season)
- Base defense: 4–3
- Home stadium: Rice-Eccles Stadium

2015 Pac-12 Conference football standings
	Conf.			Overall
Team	W		L	W		L
North Division
No. 3 Stanford xy$	8	–	1	12	–	2
No. 19 Oregon	7	–	2	9	–	4
Washington State	6	–	3	9	–	4
California	4	–	5	8	–	5
Washington	4	–	5	7	–	6
Oregon State	0	–	9	2	–	10
South Division
USC xy	6	–	3	8	–	6
No. 17 Utah x	6	–	3	10	–	3
UCLA	5	–	4	8	–	5
Arizona State	4	–	5	6	–	7
Arizona	3	–	6	7	–	6
Colorado	1	–	8	4	–	9
Championship: Stanford 41, USC 22
$ – Conference champion; x – Division champion/co-champions; y – Championship game participant; Rankings from AP Poll

The 2015 Utah Utes football team represented the University of Utah during the 2015 NCAA Division I FBS football season. The team was coached by eleventh year head coach Kyle Whittingham and played their home games in Rice-Eccles Stadium in Salt Lake City, Utah. They were members of the South Division of the Pac-12 Conference. They finished the season 10–3, 6–3 in Pac-12 play to finish in a tie for the South Division title. Due to their head-to-head loss to USC, they did not represent the South Division in the Pac-12 Football Championship Game. They were invited to the Las Vegas Bowl where they defeated rival BYU.

== Schedule ==
Date	Time	Opponent	Rank	Site	TV	Result	Attendance
September 3	6:30 p.m.	Michigan*		Rice-Eccles Stadium; Salt Lake City, UT	FS1	W 24–17	47,825
September 11	7:00 p.m.	Utah State*	No. 24	Rice-Eccles Stadium; Salt Lake City, UT (Beehive Boot/Battle of the Brothers)	ESPN2	W 24–14	46,011
September 19	8:30 p.m.	at Fresno State*	No. 21	Bulldog Stadium; Fresno, CA	CBSSN	W 45–24	33,675
September 26	6:30 p.m.	at No. 13 Oregon	No. 18	Autzen Stadium; Eugene, OR	FOX	W 62–20	57,145
October 10	8:00 p.m.	No. 23 California^{†}	No. 5	Rice-Eccles Stadium; Salt Lake City, UT (College GameDay)	ESPN	W 30–24	47,798
October 17	8:00 p.m.	Arizona State	No. 4	Rice-Eccles Stadium; Salt Lake City, UT	ESPN	W 34–18	46,192
October 24	5:30 p.m.	at USC	No. 3	Los Angeles Memorial Coliseum; Los Angeles, CA	FOX	L 24–42	73,435
October 31	5:00 p.m.	Oregon State	No. 13	Rice-Eccles Stadium; Salt Lake City, UT	P12N	W 27–12	45,853
November 7	5:30 p.m.	at Washington	No. 12	Alaska Airlines Field at Husky Stadium; Seattle, WA	FOX	W 34–23	61,420
November 14	8:00 p.m.	at Arizona	No. 10	Arizona Stadium; Tucson, AZ	FS1	L 30–37 ^{2OT}	48,912
November 21	1:30 p.m.	UCLA	No. 13	Rice-Eccles Stadium; Salt Lake City, UT	FOX	L 9–17	46,230
November 28	12:30 p.m.	Colorado	No. 23	Rice-Eccles Stadium; Salt Lake City, UT (Rumble in the Rockies)	P12N	W 20–14	45,823
December 19	1:30 p.m.	vs. BYU*	No. 22	Sam Boyd Stadium; Las Vegas, NV (Las Vegas Bowl, Holy War, Beehive Boot)	ABC	W 35–28	42,213
*Non-conference game; ^{†}Homecoming; Rankings from AP Poll and CFP Rankings after November 3 released prior to game; All times are in Mountain time

== Rankings ==
Ranking movements Legend: ██ Increase in ranking ██ Decrease in ranking RV = Received votes ( ) = First-place votes
	Week															
Poll	Pre	1	2	3	4	5	6	7	8	9	10	11	12	13	14	Final
AP	RV	24	21	18	10 (1)	5 (7)	4 (16)	3 (16)	13	13	10	18	RV	21	20	17
Coaches	RV	25	21	17	12	7 (1)	7 (1)	7 (1)	14	14	13	18	25	20	20	16
CFP	Not released									12	10	13	23	24	22	Not released

== Game summaries ==
=== Michigan ===
	1	2	3	4	Total
Wolverines	0	3	7	7	17
Utes	3	7	7	7	24

=== Utah State ===
	1	2	3	4	Total
Aggies	0	14	0	0	14
#24 Utes	7	7	7	3	24

=== At Fresno State ===
	1	2	3	4	Total
#21 Utes	10	7	7	21	45
Bulldogs	3	0	0	21	24

=== At Oregon ===
	1	2	3	4	Total
#18 Utes	6	21	28	7	62
#13 Ducks	6	7	0	7	20

=== California ===
	1	2	3	4	Total
#23 Golden Bears	7	10	7	0	24
#5 Utes	10	14	3	3	30

=== Arizona State ===
	1	2	3	4	Total
Sun Devils	10	0	8	0	18
#4 Utes	7	7	0	20	34

=== At USC ===
	1	2	3	4	Total
#3 Utes	14	3	0	7	24
Trojans	7	21	7	7	42

=== Oregon State ===
	1	2	3	4	Total
Beavers	0	6	0	6	12
#13 Utes	14	0	0	13	27

=== At Washington ===
	1	2	3	4	Total
#13 Utes	0	24	0	10	34
Huskies	3	10	7	3	23

=== At Arizona ===
	1	2	3	4	OT	2OT	Total
#10 Utes	7	10	10	0	3	0	30
Wildcats	17	3	7	0	3	7	37

=== UCLA ===
	1	2	3	4	Total
Bruins	10	0	7	0	17
#18 Utes	0	6	3	0	9

=== Colorado ===
	1	2	3	4	Total
Buffaloes	0	7	0	7	14
Utes	7	3	10	0	20

=== Las Vegas Bowl ===
	1	2	3	4	Total
Cougars	0	7	7	14	28
#20 Utes	35	0	0	0	35
