= Taysom Hill =

American football player (born 1990)

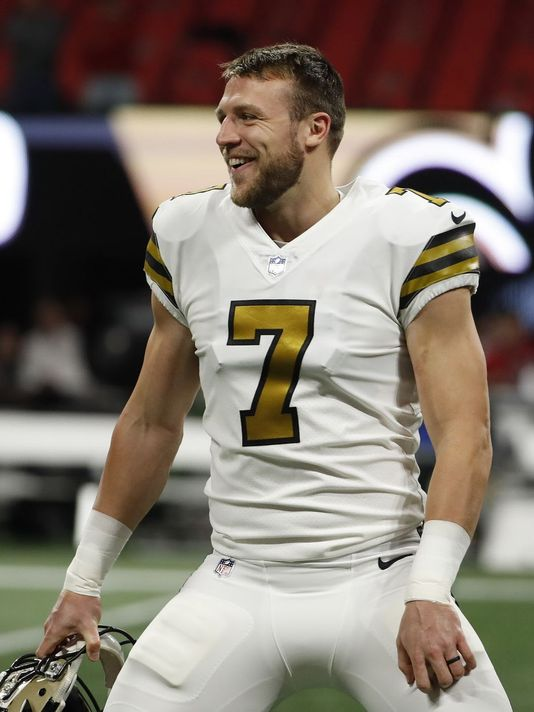
- Hill with the New Orleans Saints in 2017

Profile
- Position: Quarterback / tight end

Personal information
- Born: August 23, 1990 (age 36); Pocatello, Idaho, U.S.
- Listed height: 6 ft 2 in (1.88 m)
- Listed weight: 221 lb (100 kg)

Career information
- High school: Highland (Pocatello)
- College: BYU (2012–2016)
- NFL draft: 2017: undrafted

Career history
- Green Bay Packers (2017)*; New Orleans Saints (2017–2025)
- * Offseason or practice squad member only

Awards and highlights
- NFL record: Most single-season touchdowns without a turnover by a quarterback: 7 (2019); Only player with 1,000 receiving, passing and rushing yards during the Super Bowl era (2025)

Career NFL statistics as of 2025
- TD–INT: 12–9
- Passer rating: 88.5
- Passing yards: 2,426
- Rushing yards: 2,551
- Receiving yards: 1,034
- Return yards: 489
- Total tackles: 19
- Total touchdowns: 45
- Stats at Pro Football Reference

Taysom Shawn Hill (born August 23, 1990) is an American professional football player. He began his NFL career with the New Orleans Saints in 2017. During his nine seasons in New Orleans, Hill officially held the positions of quarterback and tight end, while also performing various other offensive and special teams roles. Hill was nicknamed "the Human Swiss Army Knife" by the Saints media due to playing multiple positions.

== Early life ==
Hill was born on August 23, 1990, in Pocatello, Idaho. He lettered in football, basketball, and track at Highland High School in Pocatello and graduated in 2009. As a senior, Hill threw for 2,269 yards and 18 touchdowns, and rushed for 1,491 yards and 24 touchdowns, earning the All-Idaho Player of the Year, Idaho Gatorade High School Player of the Year, First Team All-State selection, and All-Region and All-Conference Player of the Year accolades. He holds the school single-season and career records for total offense.

In track, Hill competed in the 200 meters and long jump. As a sophomore at the 2007 5A District IV/V/VI Regional Meet, he recorded a personal-best time of 22.5 seconds in the 200 m, placing third, and ran the fourth leg on the 4 × 200 m relay squad, helping the Rams to 1:31.41 and a first-place finish. As a senior, Hill won the long jump event at the 2009 5A Regional Meet, with a mark of 6.85 m (22 ft 5 11/16 in).

== College career ==
Hill with BYU in 2013

Coming out of high school in 2009, Hill had multiple offers from programs in the west, including University of Arizona, Boise State University, Oregon State University, Washington State University, University of Utah, Stanford University, and Brigham Young University.

Heavily recruited by head coach Jim Harbaugh, Hill had originally committed to Stanford out of high school, but after returning from his LDS church mission in Australia, he enrolled in January at BYU after learning Stanford did not allow incoming freshmen to join the team until June.

As a freshman in 2012, Hill was number two on the quarterback depth chart. He was initially brought in for special packages to utilize his athleticism in short-yardage situations. His first pass as a college player was an 18-yard touchdown against Washington State in the Cougars' season opener. Hill played in 6 games in 2012, starting and winning two games near midseason before suffering a season ending knee injury in the closing seconds of a victory over Utah State.

Hill was named the Cougars' full-time starter for the 2013 season. After a tough 19–16 loss in the season opener at Virginia, he bounced back the following week against Texas, with 259 rushing yards and three touchdowns in a 40–21 win. Hill also recorded 417 passing yards with 4 touchdowns and added 194 rushing yards in a 47–46 victory over Houston.

In 2014, Hill started the season well and led the team to a 4–0 record (including another lopsided win over Texas where he rushed for 134 yards and once again scored three touchdowns) before suffering a fractured leg against Utah State on October 3, which ended his season.

Injury again struck Hill at the start of the 2015 season, when he suffered a lisfranc fracture during the Cougars' opener against Nebraska on September 5. After the game, BYU head coach Bronco Mendenhall announced that the injury would cost Hill the rest of the season.

As a result, Hill was granted a medical redshirt for 2015, making him eligible to return for one final season in 2016. On February 16, Hill announced that he would be returning to BYU in 2016 rather than pursuing options to play at another school as a graduate transfer. On August 23, his 26th birthday, Hill was named the starting quarterback over sophomore Tanner Mangum, who had started after Hill's injury in 2015. For the 2016 season, Hill changed his jersey number from 4 to 7 to honor his late older brother, Dexter, who died in the spring of that year.

Late in 2016, Hill suffered a fourth season ending injury. In the Cougars' regular season finale against in-state rival Utah State on November 26, he left the game with a hyperextended elbow in the fourth quarter and subsequently missed the Cougars' bowl game.

=== Statistics ===
Season	Team	Games			Passing								Rushing			
Season	Team	GP	GS	Record	Cmp	Att	Pct	Yds	Y/A	TD	Int	Rtg	Att	Yds	Avg	TD
2012	BYU	6	2	2–0	42	71	59.2	425	6.0	4	2	122.4	55	336	6.1	4
2013	BYU	13	13	8–5	236	438	53.9	2,938	6.7	19	14	118.1	246	1,344	5.5	10
2014	BYU	5	5	4–1	88	132	66.7	975	7.4	7	3	141.7	87	460	5.3	8
2015	BYU	1	1	1–0	21	34	61.8	268	7.9	1	1	131.8	9	72	8.0	2
2016	BYU	12	12	8–4	222	372	59.7	2,323	6.2	12	11	116.9	137	603	4.4	8
Career		37	33	23–10	609	1,047	58.2	6,929	6.8	43	31	121.4	534	2,815	5.3	32

== Professional career ==
=== Pre-draft ===
Hill showed impressive athletic ability at BYU's pro day. His 40-yard dash of 4.44 seconds and 38.5-inch (0.98m) vertical jump would have finished first among all participating quarterbacks at the 2017 NFL Combine, beating Texas A&M's Trevor Knight's 4.54-second 40-yard dash and 35.5 inches (0.90 m) vertical.

Pre-draft measurables
Height	Weight	Arm length	Hand span	Wingspan	40-yard dash	10-yard split	20-yard split	20-yard shuttle	Three-cone drill	Vertical jump	Broad jump
6 ft 1 5/8 in (1.87 m)	230 lb (104 kg)	31 in (0.79 m)	8 7/8 in (0.23 m)	6 ft 1 7/8 in (1.88 m)	4.44 s	1.61 s	2.55 s	4.37 s	7.03 s	38.5 in (0.98 m)	10 ft 2 in (3.10 m)
All values from Pro Day

=== Green Bay Packers ===
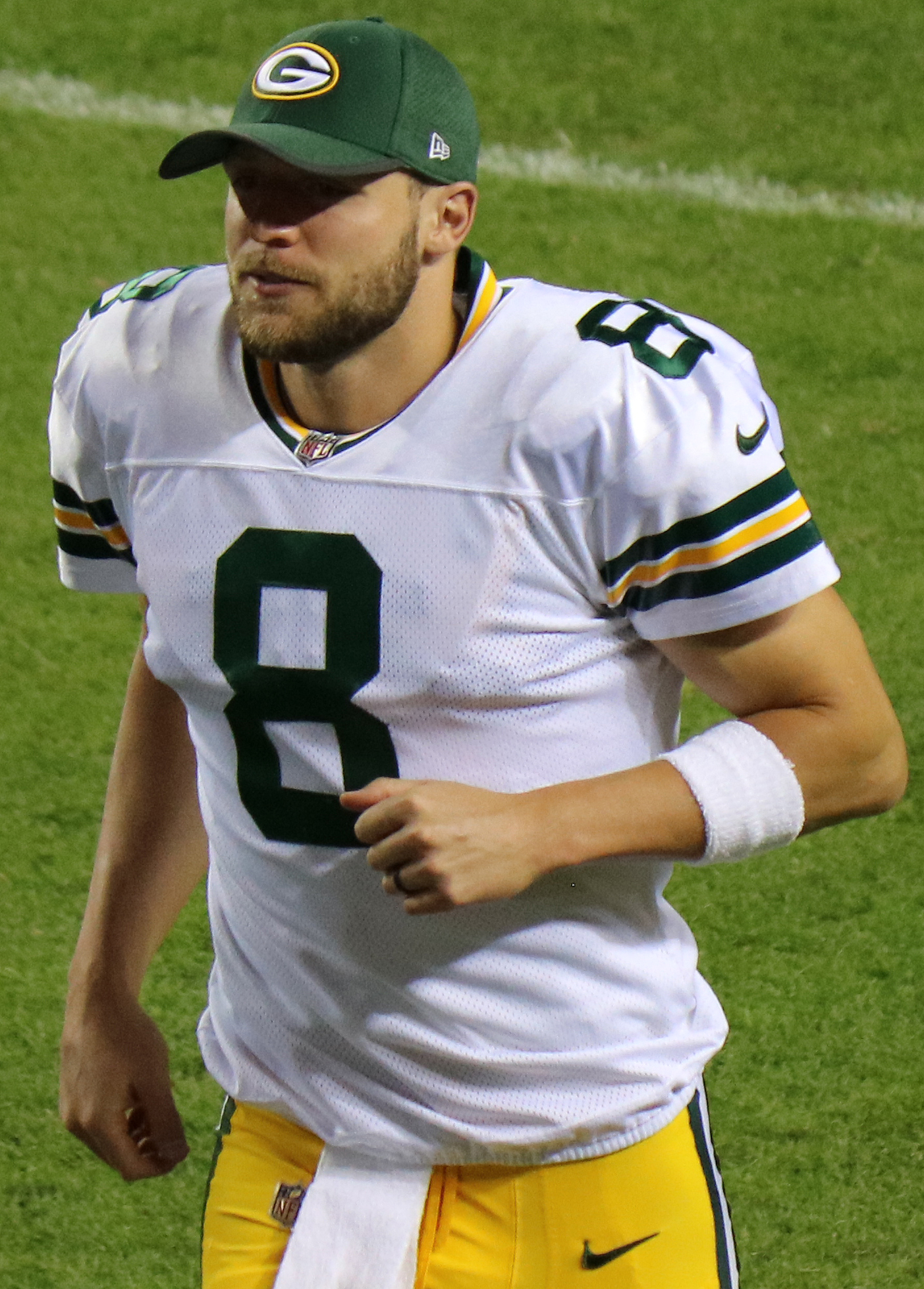
Hill in 2017

Hill went undrafted in the 2017 NFL draft, but signed with the Green Bay Packers as a free agent on May 5. He appeared in three preseason games with them, completing 14 of 20 passes, throwing for two touchdowns and rushing for another. Hill was released during final roster cuts on September 2.

=== New Orleans Saints ===
==== 2017 season ====
On September 3, 2017, Hill was claimed off waivers by the New Orleans Saints. He was promoted to the active roster on December 3 and appeared in a total of 12 special teams plays against the Carolina Panthers. In his NFL debut, Hill recorded two special teams tackles on Panthers kick returner Fozzy Whittaker.

==== 2018 season ====
Hill was listed as the third-string quarterback to start 2018 season, but was used in a variety of positions throughout the Saints' season, including as their primary kick returner.

During Week 2 against the Cleveland Browns on September 16, he returned his first kick 47 yards in the 21–18 victory. In the next game against the Atlanta Falcons, he had his most versatile performance in his NFL career. On special teams, Hill returned three kicks for 64 yards and made a tackle on a punt. On offense, he rushed the ball three times for 39 yards and was often used as a tight end to block defenders. The following week against the New York Giants, Hill completed his first NFL pass on a fake punt for 10 yards. He also rushed four times for 28 yards, continuing to line up at receiver on offense and still being the primary kick returner.

During Week 5 against the Washington Redskins, Hill rushed five times for 24 yards, including his first NFL touchdown run in a 43–19 victory. Three weeks later against the Minnesota Vikings on Sunday Night Football, Hill set up the Saints' first touchdown of the game by completing a 44-yard pass to Michael Thomas, for his second pass completion of the year in the 30–20 road victory. During Week 14 against the Tampa Bay Buccaneers, Hill blocked a punt from Bryan Anger, which led to a touchdown that propelled the Saints to a 28–14 comeback road victory, enabling them to clinch the division title. Hill was named National Football Conference (NFC) Special Teams Player of the Week for his performance.

Hill finished the season with 37 carries for 196 yards and two touchdowns, three receptions for four yards, and passed for 64 yards and an interception. He also had 14 kickoff returns for 348 net yards for a 24.86 average.

In the Divisional Round against the Philadelphia Eagles, Hill made a key play as a utility player, running for a first down on a fake punt to begin the Saints' comeback victory. During the NFC Championship Game against the Los Angeles Rams, he caught a touchdown in the controversial 26–23 overtime loss.

==== 2019 season ====
During the narrow season-opening 30–28 victory over the Houston Texans, Hill rushed twice for eight yards and caught a nine-yard touchdown. During Week 7 against the Chicago Bears, Hill rushed twice for 21 yards and caught a screen pass for a four-yard touchdown in the 36–25 road victory. In the next game against the Arizona Cardinals, Hill saw his playing time increase as Drew Brees returned from injury and caught a career high three passes for 63 yards and a touchdown during the 31–9 victory over.

During Week 13 against the Falcons on Thanksgiving, Hill blocked a punt, rushed for a 30-yard touchdown, and caught a three-yard touchdown in the 26–18 road victory. With his fourth touchdown reception of the year, Hill broke the record for most touchdown receptions by a quarterback in a single season. Two weeks later against the Indianapolis Colts on Monday Night Football, Hill caught two passes for 42 yards, including the 541st career touchdown pass thrown by Drew Brees, in the 34–7 victory.

During the Wild Card Round against the Vikings, Hill had consecutive plays of 11-yard rushing for first down, 50-yard passing followed by a block that enabled a four-yard rushing touchdown by Alvin Kamara in a drive. Hill accumulated 50 yards rushing, 50 yards passing, and 25 yards receiving, including a touchdown late in the game. They ultimately fell to the Vikings 26–20 in overtime.

==== 2020 season ====
In March 2020, the Saints placed a first round restricted free agent tender on Hill worth $4.641 million. On April 26, he re-signed with the Saints to a two-year deal worth $16.3 million, an extension to the first-round restricted free agent tender placed on Hill, to bring the total deal up to around $21 million.

On November 20, 2020, it was announced that Hill would make his first career start at quarterback for the Week 11 matchup against the Falcons due to Drew Brees' injury. Hill finished the 24–9 victory completing 18-of-23 passes for 233 yards and ran for 51 yards and two touchdowns. In the next game against the Denver Broncos, Hill recorded another game with two rushing touchdowns during the 31–3 road victory. The following week against the Falcons, he threw for 232 yards and his first two career touchdowns in the 21–16 victory. Hill's last start of the season came in Week 14 against the Eagles, where despite a two-touchdown, 291-yard passing performance, the Saints lost on the road 24–21.

==== 2021 season ====
Hill being carted off during a game in 2021

On March 14, 2021, the same day starting quarterback Drew Brees announced his retirement, Hill signed a four-year, $40 million extension with the Saints. The contract was structured in such a way as to free up salary cap space for New Orleans, saving them $7.75 million against the 2021 cap. Hill lost the starting quarterback job to Jameis Winston.

During the first half of the season, Hill spent the year as the third-string quarterback on the depth chart behind Jameis Winston and Trevor Siemian, though he continued in his role as a utility player, appearing in six of the first nine games as a runner, receiver, passer, and on special teams. After a four-game losing streak, Hill was named to the starting quarterback role prior to the Week 13 matchup against the Dallas Cowboys on Thursday Night Football. Although he led the team in rushing with 101 yards on 11 carries, Hill threw four interceptions to only two touchdowns in the 27–17 loss. He fared better in the next game against the New York Jets, going 15-for-21 for 175 yards and a 96.3 passer rating, as well as rushing for 73 yards and two touchdowns during the 30–9 road victory.

Hill signed an additional contract extension with the Saints on November 22, 2021, that gave him $22.5 million in guaranteed money. The contract held provisions with potential to reach a maximum value of $95 million over its duration. On January 9, 2022, Hill suffered a Lisfranc injury in a game against the Falcons, an injury that later required surgery.

==== 2022 season ====
New head coach Dennis Allen changed Hill's primary position from quarterback to tight end in March 2022. After the team re-signed Jameis Winston and picked up veteran Andy Dalton, it was decided that better use could be made of Hill's skill set as a tight end. Hill was expected to play as a motion tight end, flexed back from the line of scrimmage.

Although Hill began the season listed as a tight end on the Saints' depth chart, he primarily took snaps at quarterback in the wildcat formation to begin the season and would operate primarily as a rusher throughout the year. Hill generated 81 yards and a touchdown on four rushes against the Falcons in Week 1 from this position.

Hill missed the Week 3 matchup against the Panthers with a rib injury and returned in Week 4 against the Vikings. He took snaps at quarterback, rotating with Andy Dalton. From the quarterback position, Hill scored his second touchdown of the season on a goal line play out of a shotgun formation. Hill also took snaps while positioned at wide receiver.

During Week 5 against the Seattle Seahawks, Hill had one of the best statistical games of his career, scoring a career-high four touchdowns in the 39–32 victory. In total, he had nine carries for 122 yards and three touchdowns (including a go-ahead 60-yard touchdown run), completed his only pass for a 22-yard score, and recovered a fumble on special teams. Hill was named NFC Offensive Player of the Week for his performance.

Hill scored his first receiving touchdown of the season in Week 7 against the Cardinals and completed both of his pass attempts for 48 yards. On the broadcast, longtime NFL play-by-play announcer Al Michaels referred to Hill as “Slash+” in reference to former NFL quarterback Kordell Stewart, who performed a similar role as Hill early in his career with the Pittsburgh Steelers.

During a narrow Week 13 17–16 road loss to the Buccaneers on Monday Night Football, Hill recorded two pass receptions for 35 yards and a touchdown. He added 10 yards on three carries and completed his only pass attempt for 22 yards. Hill took snaps at four different positions on offense in addition to his snaps taken on special teams.

Despite his depth chart categorization at a pass catching position, Hill set new career highs for rushing attempts, rushing yards and yards per carry while totaling nine receptions for 77 yards.

==== 2023 season ====
After a season of categorization at tight end on the Saints depth chart, Hill was moved back to his original position of quarterback. Pundits speculated that this was done to take advantage of the NFL's newly implemented emergency third quarterback rule. He finished the 2023 season with 81 carries for 401 yards and four touchdowns. Hill also achieved new career highs in several receiving statistics, recording 33 receptions for 291 yards and two touchdowns.

==== 2024 season ====
After the replacement of offensive coordinator Pete Carmichael with Klint Kubiak, Hill has stated in an interview that he is being used in roles he never has before and was even in a three-point stance as a fullback during OTAs.

During a Week 11 35–14 victory over the Cleveland Browns, Hill became the second player in the Super Bowl era to record eight receptions, 130 rushing yards, and three touchdowns in a single game, totaling 206 scrimmage yards. He shares the distinction with LaDainian Tomlinson, who logged a similar stat line in 2002. Two weeks later against the Rams, Hill suffered a season-ending torn ACL. In the 2024 season, he played in eight games and finished with 23 receptions for 187 yards and 39 carries for 278 yards.

==== 2025 season ====
On October 4, 2025, Hill was activated from the PUP list for his season debut.

During a Week 16 29–6 victory over the New York Jets, Hill became the only player in the Super Bowl era to amass 1,000 career receiving, rushing, and passing yards. He finished the 2025 season with 52 carries for 114 yards and a touchdown to go with 11 receptions for 91 yards.

On July 29, 2026, Hill announced his departure from the New Orleans Saints via a social media post. He claimed that he was "still working through what comes next."

== NFL career statistics ==
Legend
**Bold**	Career high

=== Regular season ===
==== Offense ====
Year	Team	Games		Passing									Rushing					Receiving					Fumbles	
Year	Team	GP	GS	Cmp	Att	Pct	Yds	Avg	Lng	TD	Int	Rtg	Att	Yds	Avg	Lng	TD	Rec	Yds	Avg	Lng	TD	Fum	Lost
2017	NO	5	0	0	0	0.0	0	0.0	0	0	0	0.0	0	0	0.0	0	0	0	0	0.0	0	0	0	0
2018	NO	16	4	3	7	42.9	64	9.1	44	0	1	36.3	37	196	5.3	35	2	3	4	1.3	5	0	1	1
2019	NO	16	5	3	6	50.0	55	9.2	20	0	0	81.9	27	156	5.8	30	1	19	234	12.3	**45**	**6**	0	0
2020	NO	16	8	**88**	121	**72.7**	928	7.7	44	**4**	2	98.8	87	457	5.3	43	**8**	8	98	12.3	21	1	**10**	**5**
2021	NO	12	9	78	**134**	58.2	**978**	7.3	**70**	**4**	**5**	75.4	70	374	5.3	44	5	4	52	**13.0**	15	0	2	0
2022	NO	16	8	13	19	68.4	240	**12.6**	68	2	0	**146.3**	**96**	**575**	6.0	60	7	9	77	8.6	30	2	2	0
2023	NO	16	7	6	11	54.5	83	7.5	44	1	0	109.3	81	401	5.0	27	4	**33**	**291**	8.8	36	2	1	1
2024	NO	8	8	2	4	50.0	21	5.3	18	0	1	26.0	39	278	**7.1**	**75**	6	23	187	8.1	34	0	1	1
2025	NO	13	5	2	6	33.3	57	9.5	38	1	0	109.0	52	114	2.2	29	1	11	91	8.3	17	0	3	0
Career		118	54	195	308	63.3	2,426	7.9	70	12	9	88.5	489	2,551	5.2	75	34	110	1,034	9.4	45	11	20	8

==== Defense / Special teams ====
Year	Team	Tackles				Returning					Fumbles			
Year	Team	Comb	Solo	Ast	Sack	Ret	Yds	Avg	Lng	TD	FF	FR	Yds	TD
2017	NO	4	**4**	0	0.0	0	0	0.0	0	0	0	0	0	0
2018	NO	**6**	**4**	**2**	0.0	**15**	**348**	23.2	**47**	0	0	0	-2	0
2019	NO	3	2	1	0.0	1	12	12.0	12	0	0	0	0	0
2020	NO	0	0	0	0.0	0	0	0.0	0	0	0	**3**	-8	0
2021	NO	1	0	1	0.0	0	0	0.0	0	0	0	2	0	0
2022	NO	0	0	0	0.0	3	69	23.0	26	0	0	2	0	0
2023	NO	2	2	0	0.0	1	18	18.0	18	0	0	0	0	0
2024	NO	1	1	0	0.0	1	42	**42.0**	42	0	**1**	0	0	0
2025	NO	2	2	0	0.0	0	0	0.0	0	0	0	2	0	0
Career		19	15	4	0.0	20	489	24.5	47	0	1	9	-10	0

=== Postseason ===
==== Offense ====
Year	Team	Games		Passing									Rushing					Receiving					Fumbles	
Year	Team	GP	GS	Cmp	Att	Pct	Yds	Avg	Lng	TD	Int	Rtg	Att	Yds	Avg	Lng	TD	Rec	Yds	Avg	Lng	TD	Fum	Lost
2017	NO	2	0	0	0	0.0	0	0.0	0	0	0	0.0	0	0	0.0	0	0	0	0	0.0	0	0	0	0
2018	NO	2	0	0	**1**	0.0	0	0.0	0	0	0	39.6	3	8	2.7	4	0	1	2	2.0	2	**1**	**1**	0
2019	NO	1	1	**1**	**1**	**100.0**	**50**	**50.0**	**50**	0	0	**118.8**	**4**	**50**	**12.5**	**28**	0	**2**	**25**	**12.5**	**20**	**1**	0	0
2020	NO	1	1	0	0	0.0	0	0.0	0	0	0	0.0	**4**	15	3.8	10	0	**2**	5	2.5	5	0	**1**	**1**
Career		6	2	1	2	50.0	50	25.0	50	0	0	95.8	11	73	6.6	28	0	5	32	6.4	20	2	2	1

==== Defense / Special teams ====
Year	Team	Tackles				Returning					Fumbles			
Year	Team	Comb	Solo	Ast	Sack	Ret	Yds	Avg	Lng	TD	FF	FR	Yds	TD
2017	NO	0	0	0	0.0	0	0	0.0	0	0	0	0	0	0
2018	NO	**1**	0	**1**	0.0	0	0	0.0	0	0	0	0	0	0
2019	NO	**1**	**1**	0	0.0	0	0	0.0	0	0	0	0	0	0
2020	NO	0	0	0	0.0	0	0	0.0	0	0	0	0	0	0
Career		2	1	1	0.0	0	0	0.0	0	0	0	0	0	0

== Personal life ==
Hill and his wife, Emily Nixon Hill, have two children. He is the youngest of four children of Doug and Natalie Hill. Hill was named after Taysom Construction Company, formerly located in his hometown of Pocatello, Idaho.

Hill is a member of the Church of Jesus Christ of Latter-day Saints and served as a missionary for the church in Sydney, Australia from 2009 to 2011. He married Emily Nixon in 2014 in the Salt Lake Temple in Salt Lake City, Utah. Hill's brother-in-law is former BYU and NFL linebacker David Nixon.
