= Bronco Mendenhall =

American football player and coach (born 1966)

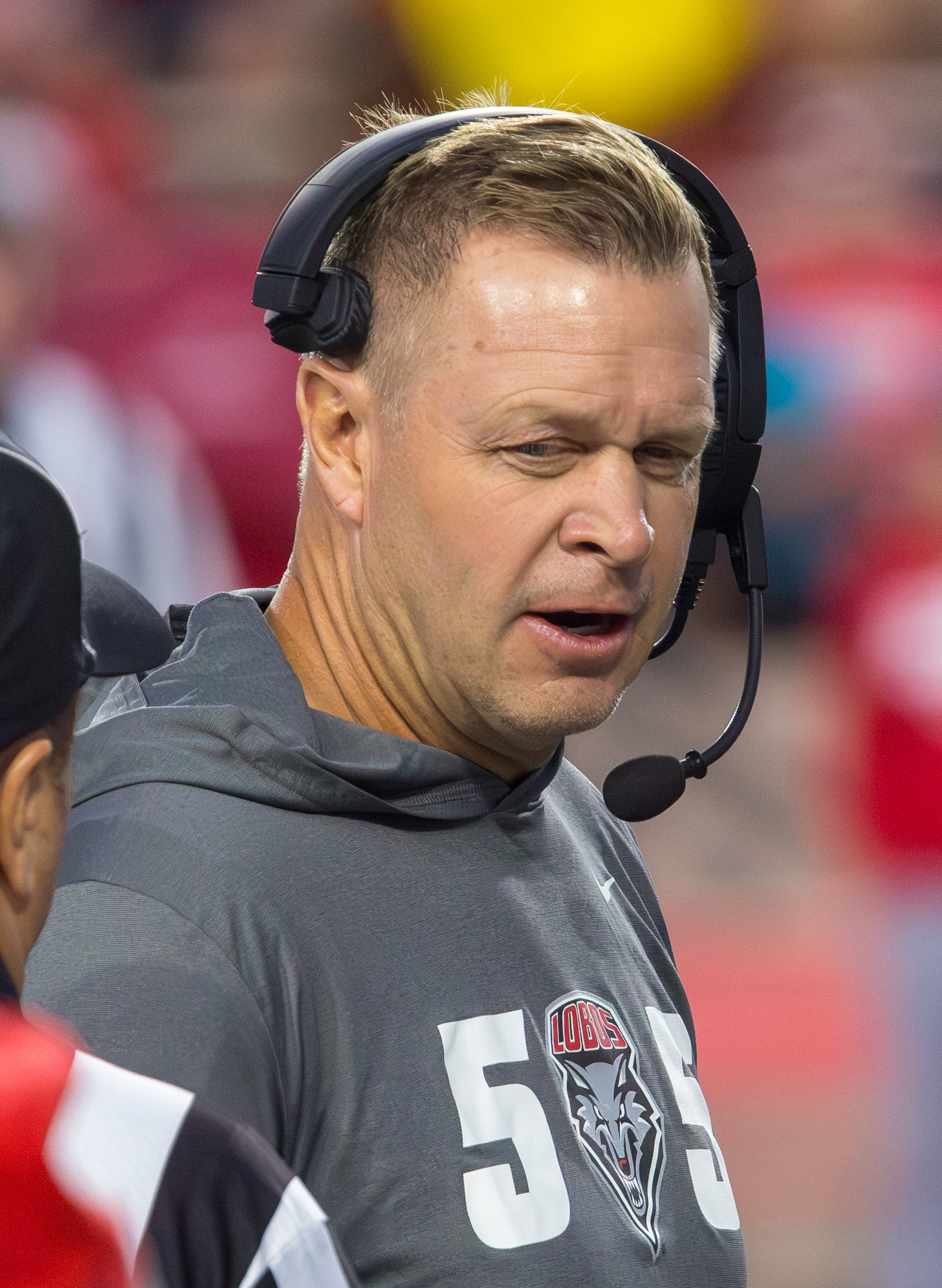
- Mendenhall in 2024

Current position
- Title: Head coach
- Team: Utah State
- Conference: Pac-12
- Record: 10–14

Biographical details
- Born: February 21, 1966 (age 60); Alpine, Utah, U.S.

Playing career
- 1984–1985: Snow
- 1986–1987: Oregon State
- Position: Defensive back

Coaching career (HC unless noted)
- 1989–1990: Oregon State (GA)
- 1991–1992: Snow (DC/DB)
- 1993: Northern Arizona (DB)
- 1994: Northern Arizona (co-DC/DB)
- 1995: Oregon State (DL)
- 1996: Oregon State (DC/DB)
- 1997: Louisiana Tech (DB)
- 1998–2001: New Mexico (DC/DB)
- 2002: New Mexico (AHC/DC/DB)
- 2003–2004: BYU (DC/DB)
- 2005–2015: BYU
- 2016–2021: Virginia
- 2024: New Mexico
- 2025–present: Utah State

Head coaching record
- Overall: 150–102 (.595)
- Bowls: 7–8

Accomplishments and honors

Championships
- 2 MW (2006, 2007); 1 ACC Coastal (2019)

Awards
- MW Coach of the Year (2006)

Marc Bronco Clay Mendenhall (born February 21, 1966) is an American college football coach who is the head coach at Utah State University (USU). He was previously the head coach at the University of New Mexico (UNM) for the 2024 season, the University of Virginia from 2016 to 2021, and Brigham Young University (BYU) from 2005 to 2015. He has a career record of 140 victories and 88 losses and has recorded fourteen postseason bowl game appearances with seven victories.

Mendenhall is known for his unorthodox methods and "Earned Not Given" motto, even having players earn their jersey numbers each season through a player-managed system intended to foster closer cooperation and peer recognition. In 2019, Mendenhall became the first Virginia coach to bring both the Commonwealth Cup and Jefferson-Eppes Trophy to Charlottesville at the same time, and his Cavaliers also won the South's Oldest Rivalry in the same season. He took Virginia to the program's first Orange Bowl.

More than 60 of Mendenhall's players have been signed to NFL contracts since 2005, including Ezekiel Ansah, the #5 overall pick in the 2013 NFL draft. Mendenhall is also known for graduating his players, and his program ranked seventh for most Academic All-Americans during his tenure of over a decade.

Mendenhall comes from a notable football family. His father played defensive end for BYU in the 1950s, while Mendenhall himself played safety for Oregon State University (OSU), where he was named team captain his senior season. His brother, Mat Mendenhall, started at defensive end for the Super Bowl Champion Washington Redskins in Super Bowl XVII.

== Coaching career ==
=== Early career ===
Mendenhall graduated from Utah's American Fork High School in 1984. He earned degrees from Oregon State University (OSU): a bachelor's degree in physical education (1988), and a master's degree in exercise and sport science (1990).

In 1990, he served as a graduate assistant coach at Oregon State under head coach Dave Kragthorpe, for whom he had played. From 1991 to 1993, he was the defensive coordinator for Snow College, a junior college in Ephraim, Utah. From 1993 to 1994, he was the defensive coordinator for Northern Arizona University.

He returned to Oregon State in 1995 as the defensive line coach, and served as the defensive coordinator the following season. When head coach Jerry Pettibone was fired after the 1996 season, he was not retained by new head coach Mike Riley. In 1997, he served as the secondary coach at Louisiana Tech. From 1998 to 2002, he was the defensive coordinator for the University of New Mexico. He and head coach Rocky Long developed a blitz-happy 3-3-5 defensive scheme that produced NFL first-round draft pick Brian Urlacher, who played in New Mexico's "Loboback" position, a cross between a linebacker and safety.

=== BYU ===
==== Defensive coordinator ====
In 2003, Mendenhall accepted the defensive coordinator position at BYU under head coach Gary Crowton. Crowton resigned at the end of the 2004 season, after his 3rd consecutive losing season. The BYU head coach position was first offered to former Cougar linebacker and then-defensive coordinator at the University of Utah, Kyle Whittingham, which resulted in Mendenhall calling UNLV head coach, Mike Sanford, about the defensive coordinator opening on his staff. Mendenhall and his wife, Holly, were prepared to tell their sons about the move to UNLV when Whittingham rejected the offer from BYU and accepted the head coaching job at Utah as Urban Meyer's replacement. BYU players had been upset that Mendenhall had not been offered the job. In response, BYU athletic director Tom Holmoe interviewed Mendenhall first in the re-opened search. Two weeks later, Mendenhall was named BYU's head coach.

==== Head coach ====
===== 2005 season =====
In 2005, his first year at the helm, the Cougars finished the regular season with a 6–6 record. Mendenhall switched back to the traditional uniforms with the Y logo on the helmets, which were worn by the most successful BYU teams. Quarterback John Beck, tight end Jonny Harline, and running back Curtis Brown led an offensive attack that was BYU's most potent since 2001, averaging 33.0 points per game (second in the Mountain West Conference (MWC) and 24th in the nation) and 462.4 yards of total offense per game. BYU tied for second in the MWC and appeared in the Las Vegas Bowl, their first bowl game since 2001, falling to California, 35–28.

===== 2006 season =====
In 2006, BYU posted its best record in five seasons. It knocked off 10 straight opponents over the final three months, registered a perfect 6–0 home record, and finished 11–2. The Cougars tallied a perfect clip against league opponents to win the MWC championship, winning on the final play of the game at Utah. They decisively defeated Oregon, 38–8, in the Pioneer PureVision Las Vegas Bowl. BYU was ranked in the top-20 in the final Associated Press, USA Today, and Harris Interactive polls, and finished 15th in the final BCS rankings. Mendenhall was named MWC and AFCA Region 5 Coach of the Year.

===== 2007 season =====
Mendenhall and the Cougars repeated as MWC champions in 2007 behind another perfect 8-0 conference season and 11–2 final record. They finished the season ranked No. 14 in both the Associated Press and USA Today polls, BYU's highest finish in the national polls since 1996. To complement their 16-game conference win streak, the Cougars boasted the nation's longest overall winning streak at 10 games. BYU reached its third consecutive Las Vegas Bowl, again winning in dramatic fashion after blocking UCLA's last second field goal to preserve a 17–16 victory. En route, Mendenhall became the first coach in school history to lead the Cougars to two consecutive bowl game victories in his first three years as head coach. A defensive specialist, Mendenhall helped BYU finish as the nation's 10th-ranked defense.

===== 2008 season =====
In 2008, BYU finished 10–3 overall and 6–2 in the MWC to achieve three straight 10-win seasons and become the first teams in Cougar history to go unbeaten at home over three consecutive seasons. BYU earned a spot in the national polls each week during the season, including a ranking as high as No. 7. Mendenhall led BYU to a third-place finish in the MWC at 6–2 and yet another bowl berth in Las Vegas where the team lost 31–21 to Arizona. BYU became one of only nine schools nationally to be ranked in the top 25 of the final BCS standings each of the past three seasons, with only five teams winning more games than the Cougars over that time span. While stressing the need for balance in life, Mendenhall began a string of Academic All-Americans at BYU in 2008 as three Cougars—Matt Bauman, Kellen Fowler, and David Oswald—were named ESPN the Magazine Academic All-Americans, a program record.

Junior wide receiver Austin Collie was named to six different All-America teams, including first-team All-America from CBSSports.com and second-team from The Associated Press. Collie led the nation in total receiving yards and receiving yards per game. He set the BYU single-season record of 1,538 receiving yards. Future NFL players Max Hall and Dennis Pitta were also among the top players in the nation at their respective positions.

===== 2009 season =====
BYU recorded an 11–2 record and 7–1 league mark in 2009. Mendenhall's team went 3–1 against ranked opponents, including a 14–13 season-opening win over No. 3 Oklahoma, a dramatic overtime win over No. 19 Utah and a 44–20 Maaco Bowl Las Vegas victory over No. 16 Oregon State. BYU finished No. 12 in the final 2009 polls earning the distinction of being one of only six programs nationally to be ranked in both final polls for four straight seasons. Individually, senior tight end Dennis Pitta earned Consensus All-America honors while setting the NCAA record for most career receiving yards by a tight end (2,901) and breaking Austin Collie's school record for career receptions (221). Scott Johnson and Matt Bauman gave BYU multiple Academic All-Americans again while future NFL running back Harvey Unga became the school's all-time leading rusher with his third-straight 1,000-yard season.

===== 2010 season =====
After losing BYU's winningest quarterback (Max Hall), all-time leading rusher (Harvey Unga), and consensus All-American tight end (Dennis Pitta), Mendenhall started the 2010 season 2–5 after playing six games against eventual bowl-bound teams. Mendenhall fired defensive coordinator Jaime Hill and took over defensive duties as the coordinator, resuming the position he held after originally joining BYU as an assistant coach. The change ignited the Cougar defense and the rest of the squad as BYU bounced back to finish the year winning five of its last six to place third in the MWC and earn the program's sixth-straight bowl invitation. BYU earned a 52–24 win over UTEP in the New Mexico Bowl. Junior Bryan Kariya was named an Academic All-American, the only FBS running back to earn the honor.

On September 1, 2010, BYU also announced that the university's football program would become independent beginning with the 2011 season. Concurrently, BYU signed an eight-year contract with ESPN. Before the 2011 season, Mendenhall filled the departure of offensive coordinator Robert Anae by promoting quarterbacks coach Brandon Doman to offensive coordinator. He also named former Cougar and NFL player Kelly Poppinga to a permanent position on the defensive staff as outside linebackers coach. A few days later, Mendenhall hired Joe DuPaix as BYU's running backs coach and recruiting coordinator. Finally, he added former BYU and Canadian Football League wide receiver Ben Cahoon as the wide receivers coach.

===== 2011 season =====
At BYU's first-ever Media Day, Mendenhall announced that he had signed a three-year contract extension that would take him through the 2013 season but hinted that coaching BYU may not be his football calling forever. According to Mendenhall, "BYU wanted to make it longer term than that. I want to be worthy of the position I have and I'm going to give it everything I have for those three (years). I'm not saying I won't go farther than that. I hope that's reported. It's not three and done. But I'm willing to lead the charge through independence, then re-evaluate."

Embarking on its first season playing as an independent, BYU finished the 2011 season, Mendenhall's seventh as head coach, with its fifth 10-win season (10–3) in the last six years, seventh straight bowl invitation and third-straight bowl win. The Cougars defeated Tulsa in a 24–21 come-from-behind victory in the Armed Forces Bowl and earned a No. 25 final ranking in USA Today Coaches Poll. After another slow start to the season, Riley Nelson was named the starting quarterback after leading Cougars to a 27–24 victory vs. USU in the fifth game of the year, helping BYU win nine of its last 10 games.

===== 2012 season =====
In 2012, BYU had an 8–5 season—including a Poinsettia Bowl victory over former MWC rival San Diego State—and Holmoe announced Mendenhall had extended his contract through the 2016 season. Said Mendenhall: "BYU is a special place and this is a special time. I'm excited to build on the success of our program over [the] past eight years, and I think there's much more that we can accomplish at BYU." Prior to the 2013 season, Mendenhall re-hired Robert Anae as the offensive coordinator and also turned over the defense to secondary coach Nick Howell.

===== 2013 season =====
After losing defensive star, Ezekiel Ansah, as the #5 pick in the 2013 NFL draft, the season started slowly for BYU. A blowout win against the #15 Texas Longhorns that put the football world on notice was sandwiched between disappointing losses at Virginia and against Utah. After adjustments by Mendenhall, the team won 5 games in a row including impressive victories against Boise State and Georgia Tech. In a game against Houston, BYU had 456 yards of offense in the first half alone, and Cody Hoffman became the all-time leading receiver in BYU history while the Cougars set the all-time school mark with 41 first downs in a single game. However, the team's defense was not as strong as usual, and BYU finished 8–5 after a loss in its bowl game against Washington.

===== 2014 season =====
For the second consecutive year, BYU throttled the #25 Longhorns on both sides of the ball and won the game going away, 41–7. The team also avenged their loss against Virginia by winning in Provo. Also, for the second consecutive year, BYU opened the season on the road in the east coast, beating UConn 35–10 on their home field. Another 8–5 season was in store as BYU lost The Old Wagon Wheel to USU, 20–35. Mendenhall and BYU played a memorable first edition of the Miami Beach Bowl against Memphis, for which star quarterback Taysom Hill was injured and did not play. The Cougars lost a double-overtime thriller to Memphis and its coach Justin Fuente. A brawl broke out after the game-ending Memphis interception, in which a Memphis player was seen dangerously swinging his metal helmet as a weapon at a BYU player who was taking on four of the Tigers at once.

===== 2015 season =====
BYU opened the season playing away at Nebraska, coming away with a hard-earned victory against the Cornhuskers, 33–28. They followed up the win with an impressive home victory against #20 Boise State, 35–24. However, a heartbreaking 23–24 loss at #10 UCLA Bruins lingered with the team to the following week, when they were blown out, 0–31, at Michigan. The team would recover though and win 7 of its last 8 regular season games to earn a 9–3 record and an eleventh consecutive bowl invitation, all under Mendenhall.

This season would be Mendenhall's last as the BYU head coach. As he had alluded to in his 2011 contract negotiations, it was soon time for him to move on from BYU and its unique situation, opportunity, and restraints. While his brother and father had played for the Cougars, Bronco himself had played at a public university (OSU) in a major conference. BYU held a joint press conference with AD Tom Holmoe and Mendenhall for his departure, in which BYU thanked him for his many successful years as head coach, leaving with the second-most wins in school history at 99. Mendenhall also thanked BYU for the one-of-a-kind opportunity and agreed to coach the team in the 2015 Las Vegas Bowl against #20 Utah.

=== Virginia ===
On December 4, 2015, Mendenhall was named the head coach of the Virginia Cavaliers, after Mike London resigned on November 29, 2015. Mendenhall had previously turned down the head coaching job at UCLA several years prior to accepting the one at Virginia. The hire gained attention across the sports spectrum, as Boston Celtics president and BYU alumnus Danny Ainge voiced his congratulations to both Mendenhall and UVA on the hire. The appointment was viewed by many as a surprise, following intense speculation involving Mark Richt, Jeff Brohm, and Sonny Dykes as candidates, and drew comparisons with the 2009 hire of Virginia's men's basketball coach Tony Bennett.

==== 2016 season ====
Going into the 2016 season, the Cavaliers had accumulated losing seasons for four consecutive years under London, and a total of eight losing seasons in the previous ten. In the press conference at BYU following the announcement of his departure, Mendenhall made note of the similarities to the Cougars when he took over as head coach, having suffered three losing seasons under Gary Crowton at that time. Things did not go well for the Cavaliers in his first season at UVA however, as the team finished 2–10, last place in the ACC, and he did not coach in a bowl game for the first time in his entire career. This 2–10 record matched UVA's record in 2013, which was itself the worst for the program since 1981. Though it was Mendenhall's first season at the helm, it was the program's fifth consecutive losing season.

Mendenhall highlighted roster management as an area where the previous staff fell short. “What I call succession planning, just the methodical, simple filling of a roster to rebuild and develop, has not been done very well,” Mendenhall said, “and I love doing that part... [but] it’s hard to develop four years of players unless you have four years of players.”

==== 2017 season ====
Virginia was picked last in the ACC Coastal by all seven football experts at CBS Sports heading into the 2017 season. Despite the poor projections, the Cavaliers surprised many by starting the season 5–1, including a 42–23 road win against a nationally ranked Boise State team. Mendenhall's Cavaliers also won the South's Oldest Rivalry against North Carolina for the first time since 2009, and later defeated Georgia Tech to claim their 6th win of the season and qualify the team for its first bowl bid since the 2011 Peach Bowl.

==== 2018 season ====
Despite coming off an improved record and a bowl appearance in 2017, Virginia once again was picked last in the ACC Coastal by ESPN and many college football news services. However, the Cavaliers handily defeated official ACC rivals Louisville, 27–3, again won the South's Oldest Rivalry against North Carolina, 31–21, and upended the No. 16 Miami Hurricanes, 16–13. However, to end the regular season they dropped two consecutive overtime games to Georgia Tech and Virginia Tech (27–30, 31–34) despite being perceived as outplaying both squads. The team then regrouped and ended things on a dominant high note with a statement win over South Carolina, 28–0, in the 2018 Belk Bowl. The lopsided victory was seen as a show of strength for not only Virginia and Mendenhall, but for ACC football's standing relative to SEC teams in the runup before Clemson's rout of Alabama for the National Championship.

==== 2019 season ====
Mendenhall's Cavaliers improved on the previous year's win total for the third straight year. After opening with a win at Pitt, they proceeded to go undefeated at home, culminating in their first victory over Virginia Tech after fifteen consecutive losses in their rivalry. The victory capped a 9–3 regular season and secured the program's first Coastal Division title and a berth in the 2019 ACC Championship Game and 2019 Orange Bowl. This was the program's first Orange Bowl bid since turning down an invite 68 years earlier (for the 1952 Orange Bowl). It was also the Cavaliers' most prestigious bowl appearance since George Welsh led the 1990 unit to the Sugar Bowl.

==== 2020 season ====
The COVID-19 pandemic cast a pall over the season, and the ACC teams played mostly only each other with FCS program Abilene Christian being a late addition for UVA. Fans were not allowed at any Virginia home games. The team finished 5–5 and declined to participate in a bowl game. Highlights included an exciting 44–41 win over No. 13 North Carolina, the Wahoos' fourth consecutive victory in the South's Oldest Rivalry.

==== 2021 season ====
UVA started the season 6–2. After two consecutive losses to North Carolina and Wake Forest, UVA won four ACC games in a row, including wins against Louisville and Miami, each on last-second field goal misses by the opponent. However, UVA lost its next game to BYU, where Mendenhall started his head coaching career. Star quarterback Brennan Armstrong left the game with an injury, and he missed UVA's next game against Notre Dame. Armstrong came back in late November, where UVA lost a shootout with Pitt. UVA ended their regular season with a close loss to Virginia Tech, a game they have won only twice since 1999. UVA ended the season with the 24th-best offense ranked by points scored and 3rd-best offense by yards per game, but 108th in opponent points per game and 122nd in opponent yards per game. On December 2, Mendenhall announced he was stepping down as UVA's head coach after their bowl game, but also said he was not retiring from coaching and confirmed that he had not yet taken another college football coaching position.

=== New Mexico ===
In December 2023, Mendenhall was hired to a five-season contract as head coach of the New Mexico Lobos. Press reports at the time noted that the team "hasn't won more than four games since 2016." His tenure began with a 35–31 loss to FCS opponent Montana State before getting his first win against New Mexico State in the Rio Grande Rivalry, their first win in the series since 2021. They won their fifth game against 18th-ranked Washington State, which ended up being their last win of the year, as they lost to Hawaii to finish 5–7.

=== Utah State ===
On December 6, 2024, Mendenhall was named the head coach at Utah State.

== Head coaching record ==
Year	Team	Overall	Conference	Standing	Bowl/playoffs	Coaches^{#}	AP^{°}
BYU Cougars (Mountain West Conference) (2005–2010)
2005	BYU	6–6	5–3	T–2nd	L Las Vegas		
2006	BYU	11–2	8–0	1st	W Las Vegas	16	15
2007	BYU	11–2	8–0	1st	W Las Vegas	14	14
2008	BYU	10–3	6–2	3rd	L Las Vegas	21	25
2009	BYU	11–2	7–1	2nd	W Las Vegas	12	12
2010	BYU	7–6	5–3	T–3rd	W New Mexico		
BYU Cougars (NCAA Division I FBS independent) (2011–2015)
2011	BYU	10–3			W Armed Forces	25	
2012	BYU	8–5			W Poinsettia		
2013	BYU	8–5			L Fight Hunger		
2014	BYU	8–5			L Miami Beach		
2015	BYU	9–4			L Las Vegas		
BYU:		99–43	39–9				
Virginia Cavaliers (Atlantic Coast Conference) (2016–2021)
2016	Virginia	2–10	1–7	T–6th (Coastal)			
2017	Virginia	6–7	3–5	T–4th (Coastal)	L Military		
2018	Virginia	8–5	4–4	T–3rd (Coastal)	W Belk		
2019	Virginia	9–5	6–2	1st (Coastal)	L Orange^{†}	25	
2020	Virginia	5–5	4–5	6th			
2021	Virginia	6–6	4–4	T–3rd (Coastal)			
Virginia:		36–38	22–27				
New Mexico Lobos (Mountain West Conference) (2024)
2024	New Mexico	5–7	3–4	T–5th			
New Mexico:		5–7	3–4				
Utah State Aggies (Mountain West Conference) (2025)
2025	Utah State	6–7	4–4	7th	L Famous Idaho Potato		
Utah State Aggies (Pac-12 Conference) (2026–present)
2026	Utah State	4–7	3–4				
Utah State:		10–14	7–8				
Total:		150–102					
National championship Conference title Conference division title or championship game berth
^{†}Indicates CFP / New Years' Six bowl.; ^{#}Rankings from final Coaches Poll.; ^{°}Rankings from final AP Poll.

== Personal life ==
Mendenhall is married to Holly Johnston. They have three sons. Mendenhall is a member of the Church of Jesus Christ of Latter-day Saints.
