= Ben Lomond High School =

Public school in Ogden, Utah, US

Location
- 1080 9th St. Ogden, Utah 84404; 41°15′00″N 111°57′06″W

Information
- Type: Public
- Staff: 61.93 (FTE)
- Enrollment: 1,338 (2023-2024)
- Student to teacher ratio: 21.61
- Colors: Columbia blue, red and white (Royal Stewart Plaid)
- Mascot: Scot, Scottish Terrier
- Team name: Scots
- Website: Ben Lomond High School

Ben Lomond High School is a comprehensive high school located in the Ogden City School District of Ogden, Utah, United States, currently educating students in grades 10–12. As of 2024, the principal is Velden Wardle, his first year at Ben Lomond (2024/25).

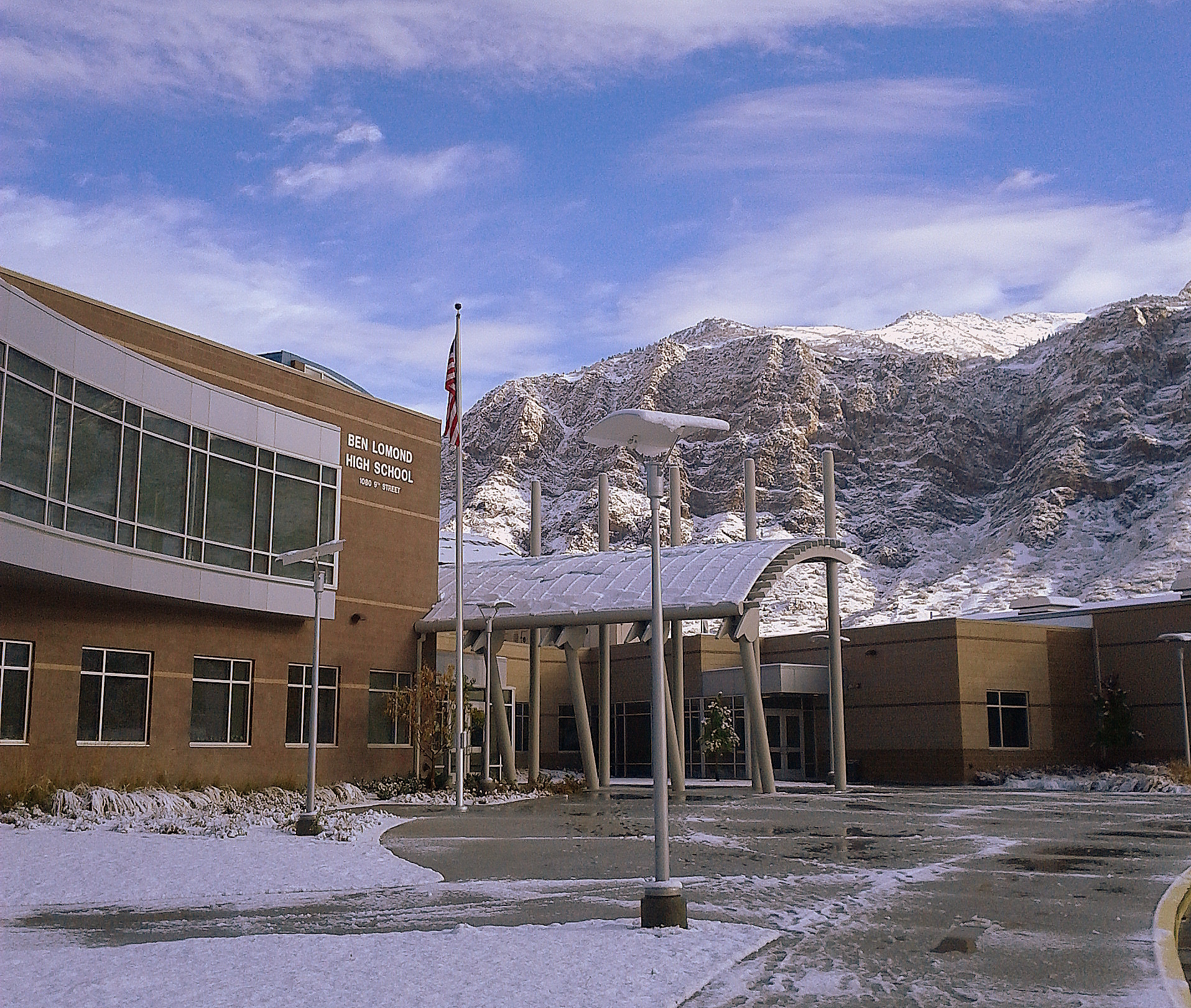
Ben Lomond High School

== History ==
Ben Lomond High School was named for the nearby Ben Lomond Mountain, so called by Scottish settlers who were reminded of Ben Lomond in Scotland. This local cultural influence gave the school its theme, including bagpipers, Royal Stewart tartan, and Scots. Students are known as "Friendly Fighting Scots."

== Rivalry ==
Ben Lomond has a long running rivalry with Ogden High School which culminates each year with a football game known as the "Iron Horse" game. The winner takes possession of a trophy called the Iron Horse, a statue of two trains to signify Ogden's well-known railroad history. In the most recent game, on October 17, 2024, Ben Lomond lost to Ogden High School 56-8.

The rivalry also exists in basketball, although not as strongly.

== Renovations ==
In June 2006, residents of Ogden passed a bond to obtain money to reconstruct and renovate Ben Lomond High and other Ogden City schools. A partial demolition commenced in June 2007 on Ben Lomond's library media center, English/Freshmen building, ceramics room, courtyard, boiler/furnace room, the ROTC drill field and two JROTC classrooms, and was completed in September 2007. Construction of a new building was completed in August 2010. This included the construction of new classrooms, cafeteria, commons area, Media Center, office area, and a "facelift" to areas not replaced by new construction, including the auditorium and gym areas. The entry of the school was changed to face 9th Street in a southeasterly direction, with a new address of 1080 9th Street. The renovation of Ben Lomond High School was awarded the Mountain States Construction Silver Award for grades K-12 in 2010.

== Notable alumni ==
- Michael Richard "Rich" Clifford (Lieutenant Colonel), Class of 1970 – NASA astronaut
- William DeVries – cardiothoracic surgeon
- Nick Howell – defensive coordinator, Vanderbilt Commodores football
- Glenn Hubbard – former Atlanta Braves second baseman and current Braves first base coach
- Major General Robertus "Dutch" Remkes (retired) – former Director of Strategy, Policy, and Assessments U.S. European Command, Stuttgart-Vaihingen, Germany
- Richard H. Stallings, Class of 1958 – U.S. Congressman representing Idaho's 2nd congressional district (1985-1993) and Chairman of the Idaho Democratic Party (2005-2007)
- Bill Allred - Local radio host
