= Tanner Mangum =

American football player (born 1993)

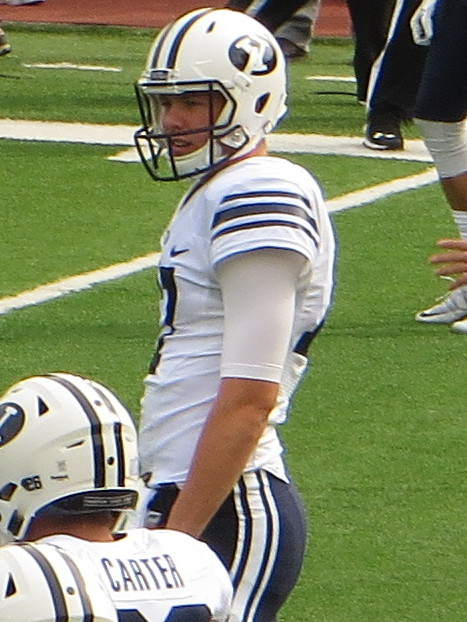
- Mangum in 2015

No. 12
- Position: Quarterback

Personal information
- Born: September 8, 1993 (age 33); Eagle, Idaho, U.S.
- Listed height: 6 ft 3 in (1.91 m)
- Listed weight: 223 lb (101 kg)

Career information
- High school: Eagle (Idaho)
- College: BYU (2015–2018)

Tanner Mangum (born September 8, 1993) is an American former college football quarterback who played for the BYU Cougars.

== Early life ==
Mangum attended Timberline High School until the end of his sophomore year and then transferred to Eagle High School in Eagle, Idaho. As senior at Eagle High School, he completed a school record 268 of 393 passes for 3,885 yards and 35 touchdowns. He was named a special recognition MVP of the Under Armour All-America Game for switching to the losing black team when they were down to a single quarterback. He was the Co-MVP of Elite 11 Camp, alongside future NFL first overall draft pick Jameis Winston. Mangum was rated by Rivals.com as a four-star recruit and was ranked as the third best pro-style quarterback in his class. He committed to Brigham Young University (BYU) to play college football.

== College career ==
Mangum grayshirted his first year at BYU, then spent two years as a missionary for the Church of Jesus Christ of Latter-Day Saints in Chile, then came to BYU. He returned from his mission prior to the 2015 season. Mangum entered his first season as the backup to Taysom Hill. After Hill left the season opener against Nebraska due to injury, Mangum replaced him and threw a 42-yard game-winning Hail Mary pass. After it was announced that Hill would miss the season, Mangum was named the starter. In his first career start he passed for 309 yards with two touchdowns and two interceptions and helped lead BYU to victory by completing a 35-yard touchdown pass on fourth-and-seven with 45 seconds left in the game to give BYU the lead. He finished the season with 3,377 passing yards along with 23 passing touchdowns and 10 interceptions, breaking numerous BYU Freshman passing records, including a career-high 365-yard passing game against UConn. For his performance during the season he was named Freshman of the Year by the Touchdown Club of Columbus.

In the 2016 season, Mangum was named backup to Hill, who decided to return for a fifth season at BYU. Mangum had limited action in the season, his total stats in the regular season totaling 14 of 18 pass attempts completed with two touchdowns. In the regular season finale against Utah State, Mangum was inserted early in the fourth quarter when Hill suffered a fourth season-ending injury, where he threw just one pass for a touchdown. After the game, it was announced that Mangum would be the starter in the 2016 Poinsettia Bowl against Wyoming. He completed 7 of 15 passes for 96 yards and scored two total touchdowns in the game.

Mangum entered the 2017 season as the undisputed starting quarterback for the Cougars. His season got off to a rocky start as BYU lost to LSU and Utah in the first two games, the latter game of which he injured his ankle causing him to miss the next two games. He returned against Boise State, however the Cougars lost 24–7. In a 33-17 loss against East Carolina, Mangum threw for over 300 yards. The next week Mangum threw for over 250, with BYU earning their second win of the year. Mangum's season would end the next week against Fresno State when he tore his Achilles tendon.

In his senior year, it was unclear if Mangum would remain the starting quarterback. Mangum competed with highly-recruited freshman Zach Wilson. It was announced on August 24, 2018 that Mangum would be the starting quarterback. Later in the 2018 season with 3–3 BYU trailing to Utah State who possessed a commanding lead, Wilson replaced Mangum. The following week Wilson was announced as the starting quarterback.

=== College statistics ===
Season	Team	CP	Passing								
Season	Team	CP	Cmp	Att	Pct	Yds	Y/A	AY/A	TD	Int	Rtg
2015	BYU	13	267	446	59.9	3,377	7.6	7.6	23	10	136.0
2016	BYU	4	22	33	66.7	241	7.3	7.8	3	1	152.0
2017	BYU	8	147	257	57.2	1,540	6.0	5.0	8	9	110.8
2018	BYU	8	114	186	61.3	1,104	5.9	5.5	5	4	115.7
Career		33	550	922	59.7	6,262	6.8	6.5	39	24	125.5

== Post-playing career ==
After not being selected in the 2019 NFL draft, Mangum attended the Detroit Lions and Oakland Raiders' rookie minicamps. He also participated in the XFL's Summer Showcase.

In December 2019, he was hired by Nike, Inc. as a communications specialist for Air Jordan.

== Personal life ==
Mangum lives in Salt Lake City with his wife Sydney and daughter.
