= Kelly Poppinga =

American football player and coach (born 1982)

Current position
- Title: Defensive coordinator
- Team: BYU
- Conference: Big 12

Biographical details
- Born: January 31, 1982 (age 44); Evanston, Wyoming, U.S.

Playing career
- 2003–2004: Utah State
- 2006–2007: BYU
- 2008: Miami Dolphins
- 2008: St. Louis Rams
- 2008: Arizona Cardinals
- Position: Linebacker

Coaching career (HC unless noted)
- 2009: BYU (intern)
- 2010: BYU (GA)
- 2011–2012: BYU (LB)
- 2013–2015: BYU (ST/LB)
- 2016–2017: Virginia (ST/OLB)
- 2018–2020: Virginia (co-DC/OLB)
- 2021: Virginia (co-DC/LB)
- 2022: Boise State (co-ST/Edge)
- 2023–2025: BYU (ST/DE)
- 2026–present: BYU (DC/ILB)

Accomplishments and honors

Awards
- Second-team All-MW (2007)

Kelly Scott Poppinga (born January 31, 1982) is an American football coach and former player. He has been the defensive coordinator at Brigham Young University (BYU) since January 2026. Prior to coaching at BYU, he was the co-defensive coordinator and the linebackers and special teams coach at the University of Virginia.

== Playing career ==
Poppinga played college football at Utah State University and BYU as a linebacker. He was signed by the Miami Dolphins of the NFL as an undrafted free agent in 2008 and also spent time that season with the St. Louis Rams and Arizona Cardinals.

== Coaching career ==
In December 2015, Poppinga was hired by Bronco Mendenhall as the outside linebackers coach at UVA after being in the same role at BYU under Mendenhall. Following the end of the 2021 season, Poppinga was not retained by the new UVA coaching staff but was hired a short time later at Boise State University. Poppinga was hired on December 7, 2022, back to BYU as a special team coordinator and defensive assistant coach. In January 2026, following the departure of Jay Hill to Michigan, Poppinga was named to replace him as defensive coordinator.

== Personal life ==
Kelly is the younger brother of former NFL linebacker Brady Poppinga.
