= Robert Anae =

American football player and coach (born 1958)

Current position
- Title: Offensive coordinator
- Team: Utah State
- Conference: Pac 12

Biographical details
- Born: December 21, 1958 (age 67); Long Beach, California, U.S.

Playing career
- 1981–1984: BYU
- Positions: Center, offensive guard

Coaching career (HC unless noted)
- 1986–1987: Hawaii (GA)
- 1990–1991: BYU (GA)
- 1992–1995: Ricks (OL)
- 1996: Boise State (OL)
- 1997: UNLV (OL)
- 1998: UNLV (RGC/OL)
- 2000–2004: Texas Tech (OL)
- 2005–2010: BYU (OC/IWR)
- 2011: Arizona (RGC/OL)
- 2012: Arizona (OL)
- 2013–2015: BYU (AHC/OC/IWR)
- 2016–2021: Virginia (OC/IWR)
- 2022: Syracuse (OC)
- 2023–2024: NC State (OC)
- 2026–present: Utah State (OC)

Robert Anae (born December 21, 1958) is an American college football coach and former player. He is the offensive coordinator (OC) for Utah State. Prior to Utah State, he was the OC at the University of Virginia and Brigham Young University (BYU), his alma mater, both under head coach Bronco Mendenhall; at North Carolina State University under head coach Dave Doeren; and at Syracuse University under head coach Dino Babers.

== Career ==
=== Early life and playing career ===
Anae is of Samoan descent and grew up in Laie, Hawaii before graduating from Kahuku High School. He served as a missionary for the Church of Jesus Christ of Latter-day Saints in Tulsa, Oklahoma from 1978 to 1980. He attended BYU and played football for the Cougars, switching from center to offensive guard. He was part of BYU's 1984 National Championship team, and also played in the Holiday Bowl each year from 1981 to 1984, as part of four Western Athletic Conference (WAC) championship squads. Anae was second-team All-WAC as a senior and played in the Hula Bowl before being drafted in the third round of the 1985 USFL draft by the New Jersey Generals.

== Coaching career ==
Anae began as offensive line coach at University of Hawaiʻi in 1986 and continued through the next year. He came back to BYU for 1990 and 1991 as an offensive line graduate assistant and followed up at Ricks College from 1992 through 1995 as its offensive line coach. He coached offensive line at Boise State University in 1996, University of Nevada, Las Vegas (UNLV) in 1997 and 1998, and Texas Tech University from 2000 to 2004. In 2005, he returned to BYU where he served as offensive coordinator until his resignation on December 30, 2010.

=== Arizona ===
Anae served the 2011 and 2012 seasons as the offensive line coach and running game coordinator at the University of Arizona, under head coaches Mike Stoops and Rich Rodriguez. In January 2013, Anae returned to BYU as the offensive coordinator.

=== Virginia ===
On December 9, 2015, Anae announced he had accepted the offensive coordinator position at the University of Virginia, going from BYU with Bronco Mendenhall who was appointed the university's new head football coach. Anae left this position after Mendenhall retired as head coach at the end of the 2021 season.

=== Syracuse ===
Anae was hired as the offensive coordinator at Syracuse University on December 26, 2021. The Orange started the season 6–0 for the first time since their undefeated 1987 season, and were ranked as high as No. 14 before losing five games in a row. After the 2022 season, Anae left Syracuse for the same position at NC State.

=== NC State ===
In December 2022, Anae was named the offensive coordinator at North Carolina State University. In his first season Anae lead the offense to a 9-4 season finishing 21st in the AP poll. He was released from his role in December 2024.

== Personal life ==
Anae's father, Famika, and brothers, Brad and Matt, also played for BYU. His son, Famika, was a BYU offensive lineman before ending his career due to injures in 2012.
