= Nick Howell (American football) =

American football coach (born 1980)

Current position
- Title: Defensive coordinator
- Team: Utah State
- Conference: Pac 12

Biographical details
- Born: February 26, 1980 (age 46); Ogden, Utah, U.S.
- Education: Weber State University (2005)

Playing career
- 2000–2001: Snow

Coaching career (HC unless noted)
- 2002: Sky View HS (UT) (DL)
- 2003: Weber HS (UT) (DC)
- 2004–2006: Ben Lomond HS (UT)
- 2007: BYU (intern)
- 2008–2009: BYU (GA)
- 2010: BYU (OLB)
- 2011–2012: BYU (ST/DB)
- 2013–2015: BYU (DC/DB)
- 2016–2021: Virginia (DC/DB)
- 2022–2023: Vanderbilt (DC)
- 2024: New Mexico (DC)
- 2025–present: Utah State (DC)

Nicholas Wade Howell (born February 26, 1980) is an American football coach. He is the defensive coordinator at Utah State.

== Coaching career ==
=== High school ===
Howell began his career coaching high school football. He worked from 2002 to 2006 for Sky View High School, Weber High School, and Ben Lomond High School where he was the head coach.

=== BYU ===
He went to BYU in 2007 as an unpaid defensive intern and became a member of the coaching staff as a graduate assistant in 2008 and later a full-time assistant in 2010. While coaching the secondary the 2011 defense was 15th in pass efficiency and 12th in overall defense. In 2012, BYU's defense finished third nationally in total defense and 10th in passing yards allowed. In 2013, BYU coach Bronco Mendenhall promoted Howell to replace him as defensive coordinator. As a full-time coordinator, Howell's Cougar defense finished 12th nationally in yards per play, 16th in pass efficiency, and 22nd in scoring defense. They ranked 20th nationally in rush defense in 2014 and sixth nationally in sacks per game in 2015.

=== Virginia ===
Following Mendenhall's departure from Brigham Young University in December 2015 Howell followed him to the University of Virginia. While at Virginia in 2017 Howells's defense ranked seventh in the nation against the pass. In 2018 the Cavaliers finished among the nation's top 20 in opponent pass efficiency. Howell also helped lead Virginia to the Atlantic Coast Conference championship game and an Orange Bowl berth tallying a program-record 43 sacks. In 2021, the defense stepped up when it mattered most finishing 28th nationally in red zone defense.

=== Vanderbilt ===
Following the end of the 2021 season, Howell was not retained by the new UVA coaching staff but was instead hired at Vanderbilt in 2022 as their defensive coordinator. While servings as Defensive Coordinator in 2022 the Commodores led the SEC with 12 interceptions and were fourth in the SEC in defensive touchdowns.

=== New Mexico ===
After the 2023 season Howell left his position at Vanderbilt with Clark Lea and reunited with Bronco Mendenhall at New Mexico.

=== Utah State ===
After one season at New Mexico Howell returned to his home state and became the defensive coordinator at Utah State, again following Mendenhall.

== Personal life ==
Howell grew up in North Ogden, Utah, and graduated in 1998 from Ben Lomond High School, where his father Roger was a longtime high school coach and athletic director. After high School he served a LDS Mission in Brazil. Following his church mission, Howell went to Snow College to play football but his career was cut short when he was injured, so he followed his father into the coaching profession. He earned a bachelor's degree in history from Weber State University and a M.A. from the University of Phoenix. Howell and his wife Brooke have four children.
