= 2009 Pacific-10 Conference football season =

American college football season

- #193980
- League: NCAA Division I FBS (Football Bowl Subdivision)
- Sport: football
- Duration: September 3, 2009 through January 1, 2010
- Teams: 10

2010 NFL Draft
- Top draft pick: DT Tyson Alualu, California
- Picked by: Jacksonville Jaguars, 10th overall

Regular season
- Champion: Oregon Ducks
- Runners-up: Stanford Cardinal; Arizona Wildcats; Oregon State Beavers

Football seasons
- 2008 2010

2009 Pacific-10 Conference football standings
	Conf.			Overall
Team	W		L	W		L
No. 11 Oregon $	8	–	1	10	–	3
Arizona	6	–	3	8	–	5
Oregon State	6	–	3	8	–	5
Stanford	6	–	3	8	–	5
No. 22 USC	5	–	4	9	–	4
California	5	–	4	8	–	5
Washington	4	–	5	5	–	7
UCLA	3	–	6	7	–	6
Arizona State	2	–	7	4	–	8
Washington State	0	–	9	1	–	11
$ – BCS representative as conference champion; Rankings from AP Poll

The 2009 Pacific-10 Conference football season started on Thursday, September 3, 2009. Oregon won the Pac-10 title, which had been held by USC for the past seven years. Seven conference teams were invited to participate in post season bowl games, with only UCLA and USC winning their bowl games.

== Preseason ==
Pre-season poll voted on by the media during the Pacific-10 Football Media Day, with the number of first-place votes shown in parentheses:

1. USC (28)
2. California (3)
3. Oregon (1)
4. Oregon State
5. Arizona State
6. Stanford
7. UCLA
8. Arizona
9. Washington
10. Washington State

== Highlights ==
=== September ===
- September 3, 2009 – In the first game of the season for both teams, #14 Oregon was upset by #16 Boise State, 19-8.
- September 12, 2009 – UCLA defeated Tennessee, 19-15, before a crowd of 102,239 at Neyland Stadium. A last-minute Volunteers drive was stopped by the Bruins at the goal line.
- September 12, 2009 – With 1:05 left, USC's Stafon Johnson scored on a 2-yard run for a touchdown to give the Trojans an 18-15 win over Ohio State in front of a record 106,033 fans in Columbus.
- September 19, 2009 – The unranked Washington upset #3 ranked USC 16-13 in Seattle after Erik Folk scored the winning field goal. The Huskies would be ranked 25th the following day.
- September 26, 2009 – Oregon pulled an upset of #6 ranked California, 42-3 at Autzen Stadium.

=== October ===
- October 3, 2009 – Stanford ended UCLA's unbeaten record, winning 24-16 at Stanford; California lost their second conference game, 30-3 to USC; Oregon won their fourth in a row with a 52-6 victory over Washington State. Oregon State beat Arizona State 28-17 at Sun Devil Stadium. It was Oregon State's first win over Arizona State at Sun Devil Stadium in 40 years.
- October 10, 2009 – Oregon won its fifth consecutive game, 24-10 over UCLA; Stanford lost its first conference game, 38-28 to Oregon State at Reser Stadium, Corvallis.
- October 17, 2009 – California won its first conference game against UCLA, the first win for the Bears in Southern California during Jeff Tedford's tenure as head coach. Cal had previously been 0-7 on the road against USC and UCLA.
- October 17, 2009 – USC held off Notre Dame for their eighth consecutive win over the Fighting Irish, 34-27.
- October 24, 2009 – The week's Pac-10 game of the week featured Oregon State against USC. The Beavers had the longest road winning streak at five games and had beaten the Trojans twice in their previous three meetings. USC had won 46 of the last 47 home games, not allowing more than 10 points at the Coliseum since mid-2007, and had surrendered a total of 38 points during the last ten home games. The Trojans managed to hold off the Beavers and win 42-36.
- October 31, 2009 – The Halloween match-up between USC (BCS No. 5) and Oregon (BCS No. 10) could determine the conference champion. USC had lost three in a row in the state of Oregon prior to the game. ESPN's College Gameday broadcast from Eugene. The Ducks won, 47-20, to stay on top of the conference standings. The defeat was the worst in the Pete Carroll era, giving up the most points and by the largest margin.
- October 31, 2009 – With 21 seconds left in the game, Giorgio Tavecchio kicked a 24-yard field goal to give California a comeback victory over Arizona State, 23-21.
- October 31, 2009 – Behind 19-3 in the fourth quarter, UCLA rallied back with two passing touchdowns and two two-point conversions to tie the game against Oregon State. James Rodgers scored for the Beavers in less than two minutes to pull out a win at home, 26-19.

=== November ===
- November 7, 2009 - #7 Oregon's undefeated conference season came to an end at Stanford, being upset 51-42. Stanford became bowl-eligible for the first time since 2001 and earned a Top 25 ranking at #25. Running back Toby Gerhart ran for a school record 223 yards. Both teams have five victories in the Pac-10 championship race.
- November 7, 2009 - Oregon State upsets #23 California, with the Bears' last home victory against the Beavers being in 1997.
- November 14, 2009 - With the conference wide open, Toby Gerhart and the #25 Stanford Cardinal pulled their second upset in a row with a 55-21 road victory over #11 USC, the most points ever surrendered by the Trojans. USC has lost three of five at home to Stanford during the last ten years (2001, 2007, and 2009).
- November 14, 2009 - Oregon State defeated Washington, 48-21, to stay in the hunt for the conference championship.
- November 14, 2009 - California hung on to upset #18 Arizona 24-16 in the Golden Bears' final home season game.
- November 14, 2009 - With UCLA's 43-7 win over Washington State and Oregon's 44-21 win over Arizona State, four teams scored over 40 points.
- November 21, 2009 - #11 Oregon at Arizona was the game-of-the-week, with both teams playing for a trip to the Rose Bowl on New Year's Day. Arizona has never been to the Rose Bowl while Oregon has not been there since the 1994 season. In double overtime, Oregon came back to win the game 44-41.
- November 21, 2009 - #25 California upsets #17 Stanford in the 112th Big Game 34-28 to retain possession of the Stanford Axe, ending the Cardinal's Rose Bowl hopes. Stanford had scored 106 points in its past two games in victories over Oregon and USC.
- November 21, 2009 - #19 Oregon State defeats Washington State 42-10 to set up a head-to-head matchup against Oregon in the Civil War to decide the conference champion.
- November 28, 2009 - Rivalry Week: UCLA vs. USC, WSU vs. Washington, ASU vs. Arizona. The winners were Arizona 20-17, Washington 30-0, and USC 28-7.
- November 28, 2009 - Stanford rallied to defeat Notre Dame for the first time since 2001, 45-38.

=== December ===
- December 3, 2009 - Oregon defeats Oregon State 37-33 in the Civil War to claim the conference championship and earn a spot in the 2010 Rose Bowl against Ohio State, Oregon's first trip since the 1995 Rose Bowl.
- December 5, 2009 - With Arizona defeating #20 USC 21-17, Arizona State became the only school in the Pac-10 that has not beaten the Trojans at least once during the Pete Carroll era.
- December 5, 2009 - Washington upsets #19 California 42-10, becoming the eleventh FBS team since 1946 to follow a winless 2008 season with five victories.
- December 12, 2009 – Army fell short of bowl eligibility by losing 17-3 in the Army–Navy Game to allow UCLA to go to the EagleBank Bowl, scheduled for December 29, 2009.

== Notes ==
- September 3 - Oregon running back LeGarrette Blount was suspended by the university for the season after he punched Boise State defensive end Byron Hout in the chin after Hout had taunted him in front of Boise State head coach Chris Petersen at the end of their season opening game. Blount was reinstated on November 9, 2009 with the approval of the conference.
- September 28 - A weight room accident ended USC tailback Stafon Johnson's season.
- The Pac-10 will use football stars in a new promotion: California's Aaron Rodgers; Oregon's Joey Harrington; Oregon State's Mike Riley (coach); Southern California's Pete Carroll (coach), Marcus Allen, and Carson Palmer; Washington's Warren Moon; and Washington State's Drew Bledsoe.
- The media's only correct pre-season prediction was on Washington State.
- December 12 - Stanford running back Toby Gerhart finishes second to Alabama running back Mark Ingram II in the closest vote in Heisman Trophy history.
- December 17 - It was reported that Joe McKnight, USC tailback, may have violated NCAA rules by driving a sport utility vehicle owned by a Santa Monica businessman.
- January 1, 2010 - With Oregon's loss to Ohio State in the Rose Bowl, the Pac-10's bowl record for the 2009 season was 2-5. The previous season all five Pac-10 teams to receive bowl bids won their bowl games.
- January 10, 2010 – USC head coach Pete Carroll told his players that he will resign his position with the Trojans and become the new head coach of the Seattle Seahawks.
- January 13, 2010 – Tennessee head coach Lane Kiffin was named the new head coach of the Trojans. He had been an assistant coach at USC from 2001 to 2006 under Pete Carroll, including a stint as offensive coordinator.
- January 25, 2010 – California announced a $321 million retrofit of Memorial Stadium to begin in June.
- February 18, 2010 – Cal's defensive coordinator Bob Gregory left for Boise State and was replaced by Clancy Pendergast, former defensive coordinator for the Oakland Raiders. Stanford replaced defensive coordinator Ron Lynn with Vic Fangio, who had formerly been with the Baltimore Ravens. Former Chicago Bears offensive coordinator Ron Turner will be quarterbacks and wide receivers coach and former Minnesota Vikings assistant Derek Mason will be the defensive backs coach at Stanford.
- February 21, 2010 – At Oregon, LaMichael James was arrested on February 17 and pleaded not guilty to charges of fourth-degree assault, physical harassment and strangulation. Oregon kicker Rob Beard and defensive end Matt Simms were cited for misdemeanor assault investigation. Simms was dismissed from the team and kicker Mike Bowlin left the team. Simms and Beard have pleaded not guilty. Jamere Holland was dismissed from the Oregon football team for his Facebook comments.
- April 22, 2010 - Cal defensive end Tyson Alualu and running back Jahvid Best were selected as the 10th and 30th overall picks in the 2010 NFL draft, respectively. They were the only Pac-10 players to be drafted in the first round. This also marked the first time since 2003 that two Cal players had been drafted in the first round of the NFL Draft.
- April 22–24, 2010 - Twenty eight players were selected in the 2010 NFL draft. USC had the most players selected, with seven. Arizona State had four, California, Oregon, Stanford, and UCLA each had three, Arizona and Washington had two each, and Oregon State had one player selected. No players from Washington State were drafted.

== Players of the week ==
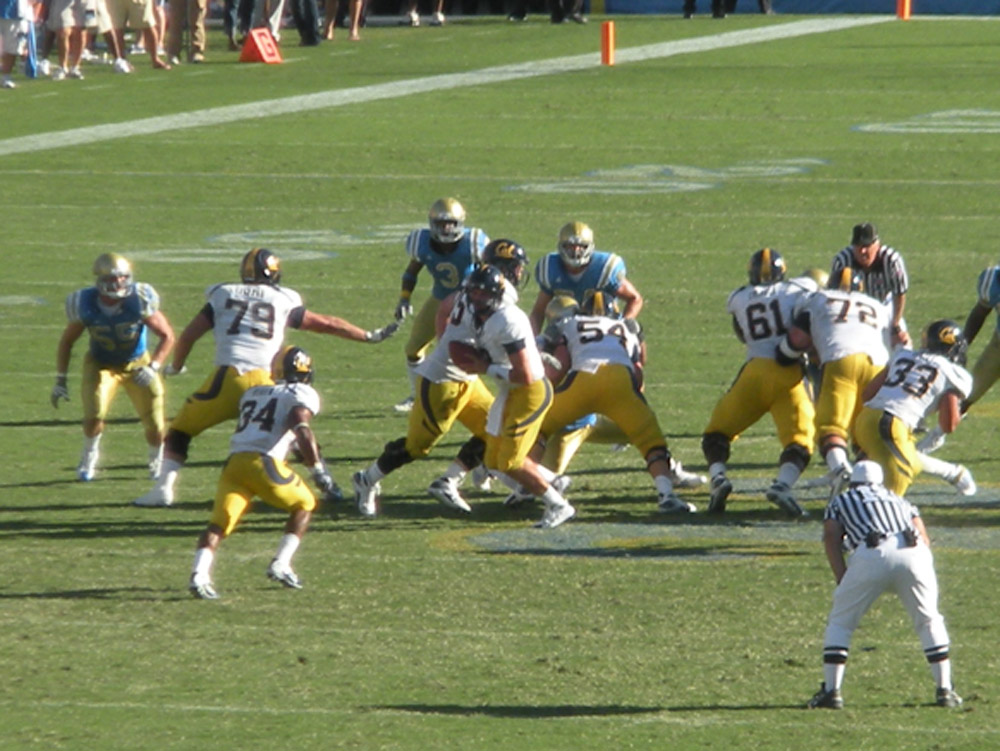
Cal's Shane Vereen (no. 34) takes the handoff from Kevin Riley (no. 13) at the Cal-UCLA game

Week	Offensive		Defensive		Special teams	
Week	Player	Team	Player	Team	Player	Team
1 – Sep. 5	Kevin Riley, QB	CAL	Mike Nixon, OLB	ASU	Chris Owusu, KR	STAN
2 – Sep. 12	Joe McKnight, TB	USC	Reggie Carter, MLB	UCLA	Kai Forbath, PK	UCLA
3 – Sep. 19	Jahvid Best, TB	CAL	Donald Butler, ILB	WASH	Erik Folk, PK	WASH
4 – Sep. 26	Ed Dickson, TE	ORE	Devin Ross, CB	ARZ	Chris Owusu, KR	STAN
5 – Oct. 3	James Rodgers, WR	OSU	Taylor Mays, FS	USC	Damian Williams, PR	USC
6 – Oct. 10	Jacquizz Rodgers, RB	OSU	Mason Foster, OLB	WASH	Kenjon Barner, KR	ORE
7 – Oct. 17	Nick Foles, QB	ARIZ	Jurrell Casey, NT	USC	Bryan Anger, P	CAL
8 – Oct. 24	Allen Bradford, TB	USC	Cam Nelson, FS	ARIZ	Damian Williams, PR	USC
9 – Oct. 31	LaMichael James, RB	ORE	Mike Mohamed, ILB	CAL	Justin Kahut, PK	OSU
10 - Nov. 7	Toby Gerhart, RB	STAN	Will Harris, SS,	USC	Nate Whitaker, PK	STAN
11 - Nov. 14	Toby Gerhart, RB	STAN	Akeem Ayers, OLB	UCLA	Giorgio Tavecchio, PK	CAL
12 - Nov. 21	Jeremiah Masoli, QB	ORE	Mike Mohamed, ILB	CAL	Nate Costa, H	ORE
13 - Nov. 28	Toby Gerhart, RB	STAN	Malcolm Smith, OLB	USC	Alex Zendejas, K	ARIZ
14 – Dec. 7	Jake Locker, QB	WASH	Earl Mitchell, DT	ARIZ	Justin Kahut, K	OSU

== Pac-10 vs. BCS matchups ==
Date	Visitor	Home	Winner	Notes
September 5	LSU	Washington	LSU	
September 5	Maryland	Cal	Cal	
September 12	UCLA	Tennessee	UCLA	UCLA's second straight win against Tennessee
September 12	USC	Ohio State	USC	USC won with a late touchdown
September 12	Purdue	Oregon	Oregon	
September 19	Arizona	Iowa	Iowa	
September 19	Cal	Minnesota	Cal	
September 19	Kansas State	UCLA	UCLA	
September 19	Cincinnati	Oregon State	Cincinnati	Oregon State's first non-conference home loss since 1996.
September 26	Arizona State	Georgia	Georgia	
October 3	Washington	Notre Dame	Notre Dame	Overtime
October 17	USC	Notre Dame	USC	USC's eighth consecutive win over Notre Dame
October 31	Washington State	Notre Dame	Notre Dame	Played at the Alamodome in San Antonio, Texas
November 28	Notre Dame	Stanford	Stanford	Stanford's first win over Notre Dame since 2001

== Bowl games ==
Bowl	Date	Winner*	Score	Loser*	Score	Location	Time^{+}	Network	Pac-10's Record	Notes
Las Vegas Bowl	December 22, 2009	BYU	44	**Oregon State**	20	Las Vegas	5:00 p.m.	ESPN	0–1	BYU's fifth straight appearance in the Las Vegas Bowl; Oregon State lost its first bowl game since 2002
Poinsettia Bowl	December 23, 2009	Utah	37	**California**	27	San Diego, California	5:00 p.m.	ESPN	0–2	Utah earned its ninth straight bowl victory; Cal lost its first bowl game since 2004
Emerald Bowl	December 26, 2009	**USC**	24	Boston College	13	San Francisco, California	5:00 p.m.	ESPN	1–2	USC's first non-BCS Bowl appearance since 2001
EagleBank Bowl	December 29, 2009	**UCLA**	30	Temple	21	Washington, D.C.	1:30 p.m.	ESPN	2–2	UCLA scored 13 unanswered points in the fourth quarter to come from behind and win its first bowl game since 2005
Holiday Bowl	December 30, 2009	Nebraska	33	**Arizona**	0	San Diego, California	5:00 p.m.	ESPN	2–3	Rematch of the 1998 Holiday Bowl, which Arizona won 23–20; Arizona's second Holiday Bowl appearance since 1998; first shutout in Holiday Bowl history
Sun Bowl	December 31, 2009	Oklahoma	31	**Stanford**	27	El Paso, Texas	11:00 a.m.	CBS	2–4	First bowl game for Stanford since 2001; Oklahoma's first bowl win since 2005
Rose Bowl	January 1, 2010	Ohio State	26	**Oregon**	17	Pasadena, California	2:00 p.m.	ABC	2–5	Oregon's second Rose Bowl appearance since 1958; Ohio State's first bowl win since 2006; Oregon's first bowl loss since 2006
*Pac-10 team is **bolded**. ^{+}Time given is Pacific Time

== Head coaches ==
- Mike Stoops, Arizona
- Dennis Erickson, Arizona State
- Jeff Tedford, California
- Chip Kelly, Oregon
- Mike Riley, Oregon State
- Jim Harbaugh, Stanford
- Rick Neuheisel, UCLA
- Pete Carroll, USC
- Steve Sarkisian, Washington
- Paul Wulff, Washington State

== Awards and honors ==
Doak Walker Award

- Toby Gerhart, RB, Stanford

Lou Groza Award

- Kai Forbath, PK, UCLA

Tom Hansen Conference Medal

- Jeff Byers, USC
- Toby Gerhart, Stanford

=== All-Americans ===
Walter Camp Football Foundation All-America:

- Place kicker Kai Forbath, UCLA, first team All-America
- Defensive tackle Brian Price, UCLA, second-team All-America
- Safety Rahim Moore, UCLA, second-team All-America

FWAA All-America Team:

- Toby Gerhart, RB, Stanford
- Kai Forbath, PK, UCLA

Sporting News All-America team:

- Kai Forbath, PK, UCLA (first-team)
- Brian Price, DT, UCLA (second-team)
- Rahim Moore, S, UCLA (third-team)

AFCA Coaches' All-Americans First Team:

- Toby Gerhart, RB, Stanford
- Brian Price, DL, UCLA
- Kai Forbath, PK, UCLA

ESPN All-America team:

- Kai Forbath, PK, UCLA
- Brian Price, DT, UCLA

=== All-Pac-10 teams ===
- Offensive Player of the Year: Toby Gerhart, RB, Stanford
- Pat Tillman Defensive Player of the Year: Brian Price, DT, UCLA
- Offensive Freshman of the Year: LaMichael James, RB, Oregon
- Defensive Freshman of the Year: Vontaze Burfict, MLB, Arizona State
- Coach of the Year: Chip Kelly, Oregon
- Charles Brown, OT, USC, Morris Trophy winner
- Stephen Paea, DT, Oregon State, Morris Trophy winner

First Team:

Pos.	Name	Yr.	School	Pos.	Name	Yr.	School	Pos.	Name	Yr.	School
Offense				Defense				Specialists			
QB	Sean Canfield	Sr.	Oregon State	DL	Brian Price	Jr.	UCLA	PK	Kai Forbath	Jr.	UCLA
RB	Toby Gerhart	Sr.	Stanford	DL	Stephen Paea	Jr.	Oregon State	P	Bryan Anger	So.	California
RB	Jacquizz Rodgers	So.	Oregon State	DL	Tyson Alualu	Sr.	California	KOR	Chris Owusu	So.	Stanford
WR	James Rodgers	Jr.	Oregon State	DL	Dexter Davis	Sr.	Arizona State	PR	Damian Williams	Jr.	USC
WR	Damian Williams	Jr.	USC	LB	Keaton Kristick	Sr.	Oregon State	ST	Suaesi Tuimaunei	Jr.	Oregon State
TE	Ed Dickson	Sr.	Oregon	LB	Mike Mohamed	Jr.	California				
OL	Chris Marinelli	Sr.	Stanford	LB	Reggie Carter	Sr.	UCLA				
OL	Mike Tepper	Sr.	California	DB	Rahim Moore	So.	UCLA				
OL	Jeff Byers	Sr.	USC	DB	Syd'Quan Thompson	Sr.	California				
OL	Charles Brown	Sr.	USC	DB	Taylor Mays	Sr.	USC				
OL	Gregg Peat	Sr.	Oregon State	DB	Alterraun Verner	Sr.	UCLA				

ST=special teams player (not a kicker or returner)

=== All-Academic ===
First Team:

Pos.	Name	School	Yr.	GPA	Major
Offense
QB	Andrew Luck	Stanford	RFr.	3.55	Undeclared
RB	Josh Catron	Stanford	Sr.	3.48	Economics
RB	Toby Gerhart	Stanford	Sr.	3.25	Management Science & Engineering
WR	Casey Kjos	Oregon State (2)	Jr.	3.63	Psychology & Sociology
WR	Alex Lagemann	California	Jr.	3.68	Media Studies
TE	David Paulson	Oregon	So.	3.68	Business Administration
OL	Mark Boskovich	California (2)	Jr.	3.73	Political Science
OL	Micah Hannam	Washington State (2)	Jr.	3.59	Civil Engineering
OL	Andrew Phillips	Stanford	Jr.	3.53	Classics
OL	Chris Prummer	Washington State	Jr.	3.88	Zoology
OL	Carson York	Oregon	RFr.	3.70	Journalism
Defense
DL	Kevin Frahm	Oregon State	So.	3.24	Political Science
DL	Kevin Kooyman	Washington State	Sr.	3.16	Management and Operations
DL	Erik Lorig	Stanford	Sr.	3.12	Public Policy
DL	Tom McAndrew	Stanford	Sr.	3.58	Science, Technology and Society
LB	Mike Mohamed	California	Sr.	3.43	Business Administration
LB	Mike Nixon	Arizona State	Sr.	4.07	Political Science
LB	Will Powers	Stanford	Sr.	3.48	Classics
DB	Victor Aiyewa	Washington	Jr.	3.36	Sociology
DB	Cameron Collins	Oregon State	So.	3.37	Business
DB	Jay Matthews	Washington State	RFr.	3.68	Undeclared
DB	Chima Nwachukwu	Washington State	Jr.	3.45	Political Science
Specialists
PK	Nate Whitaker	Stanford	Jr.	3.38	Engineering
P	Jeff Locke	UCLA	RFr.	3.69	Undeclared
RS	Taylor Kavanaugh	Oregon State	Sr.	3.28	Construction Engineering

(2) Two-time first-team All-Academic selection; (3) Three-time first-team All-Academic selection

== 2010 NFL draft ==
Round	Overall pick	NFL team	Player	Position	College
1	10	Jacksonville Jaguars	Tyson Alualu	Defensive tackle	California
1	30	Detroit Lions	Jahvid Best	Running back	California
2	35	Tampa Bay Buccaneers	Brian Price	Defensive tackle	UCLA
2	38	Cleveland Browns	T. J. Ward	Safety	Oregon
2	42	New England Patriots	Rob Gronkowski	Tight end	Arizona
2	49	San Francisco 49ers	Taylor Mays	Safety	USC
2	51	Minnesota Vikings	Toby Gerhart	Running back	Stanford
2	64	New Orleans Saints	Charles Brown	Offensive tackle	USC
3	70	Baltimore Ravens	Ed Dickson	Tight end	Oregon
3	77	Tennessee Titans	Damian Williams	Wide receiver	USC
3	79	San Diego Chargers	Donald Butler	Linebacker	Washington
3	81	Houston Texans	Earl Mitchell	Defensive tackle	Arizona
3	86	Philadelphia Eagles	Daniel Te'o-Nesheim	Defensive end	Washington
3	92	Cleveland Browns	Shawn Lauvao	Offensive tackle	Arizona State
3	94	Indianapolis Colts	Kevin Thomas	Cornerback	USC
4	100	Minnesota Vikings	Everson Griffen	Defensive end	USC
4	104	Tennessee Titans	Alterraun Verner	Cornerback	UCLA
4	111	Seattle Seahawks	Walter Thurmond	Cornerback	Oregon
4	112	New York Jets	Joe McKnight	Running back	USC
6	185	Seattle Seahawks	Anthony McCoy	Tight end	USC
6	190	Oakland Raiders	Travis Goethel	Linebacker	Arizona State
6	206	San Francisco 49ers	Kyle Williams	Wide receiver	Arizona State
7	219	Washington Redskins	Terrence Austin	Wide receiver	UCLA
7	225	Denver Broncos	Syd'Quan Thompson	Cornerback	California
7	233	Arizona Cardinals	Jim Dray	Tight end	Stanford
7	236	Seattle Seahawks	Dexter Davis	Linebacker	Arizona State
7	239	New Orleans Saints	Sean Canfield	Quarterback	Oregon State
7	253	Tampa Bay Buccaneers	Erik Lorig	Defensive end	Stanford
