= 2009 All-Pacific-10 Conference football team =

The 2009 All-Pacific-10 Conference football team consists of American football players chosen by various organizations for All-Pacific-10 Conference teams for the 2009 Pacific-10 Conference football season. The Oregon Ducks won the conference, posting an 8–1 conference record. Oregon then lost to the Big Ten champion Ohio State Buckeyes in the Rose Bowl 26 to 17. Stanford running back Toby Gerhart was voted Pac-10 Offensive Player of the Year. UCLA defensive tackle Brian Price was voted Pat Tillman Pac-10 Defensive Player of the Year.

== Offensive selections ==
=== Quarterbacks ===
- Sean Canfield, Oregon St. (Coaches-1, ESPN-1)
- Jeremiah Masoli, Oregon (Coaches-2)

=== Running backs ===
- Toby Gerhart#, Stanford (Coaches-1, ESPN-1)
- Jacquizz Rodgers, Oregon St. (Coaches-1, ESPN-1)
- LaMichael James, Oregon (Coaches-2, ESPN-1)
- Jahvid Best, California (Coaches-2)

=== Wide receivers ===
- James Rodgers, Oregon St. (Coaches-1, ESPN-1)
- Damian Williams, USC (Coaches-1, ESPN-1)
- Chris McGaha, Arizona St. (Coaches-2)
- Jermaine Kearse, Washington (Coaches-2)

=== Tight ends ===
- Ed Dickson, Oregon (Coaches-1, ESPN-1)
- Jim Dray, Stanford (Coaches-2)

=== Tackles ===
- Chris Marinelli, Stanford (Coaches-1, ESPN-1)
- Charles Brown, USC (Coaches-1, ESPN-1)
- Mike Tepper, California (Coaches-1)
- Adam Grant, Arizona (Coaches-2)

=== Guards ===
- Jeff Byers, USC (Coaches-1, ESPN-1)
- Gregg Peat, Oregon St. (Coaches-1, ESPN-1)
- Shawn Lauvao, Arizona St. (Coaches-2)

=== Centers ===
- Kenny Alfred, Washington St. (Coaches-2, ESPN-1)
- Colin Baxter, Arizona (Coaches-2)
- Chase Beeler, Stanford (Coaches-2)

== Defensive selections ==
=== Ends ===
- Tyson Alualu, California (Coaches-1, ESPN-1)
- Daniel Te'o-Nesheim, Washington (Coaches-2, ESPN-1)
- Dexter Davis, Arizona St. (Coaches-1)
- Everson Griffen, USC (Coaches-2)
- Earl Mitchell, Arizona (Coaches-2)
- Will Tukuafu, Oregon (Coaches-2)

=== Tackles ===
- Brian Price#, UCLA (Coaches-1, ESPN-1)
- Stephen Paea, Oregon St. (Coaches-1, ESPN-1)

=== Linebackers ===
- Keaton Kristick, Oregon St. (Coaches-1, ESPN-1)
- Mike Mohamed, California (Coaches-1, ESPN-1)
- Donald Butler, Washington (Coaches-2, ESPN-1)
- Reggie Carter, UCLA (Coaches-1)
- Xavier Kelly, Arizona (Coaches-2)
- Casey Matthews, Oregon (Coaches-2)

=== Cornerbacks ===
- Alterraun Verner, UCLA (Coaches-1, ESPN-1)
- Trevin Wade, Arizona (Coaches-2, ESPN-1)
- Syd'Quan Thompson, California (Coaches-1)
- Josh Pinkard, USC (Coaches-2)
- Kevin Thomas, USC (Coaches-2)

=== Safeties ===
- Rahim Moore, UCLA (Coaches-1, ESPN-1)
- Taylor Mays, USC (Coaches-1, ESPN-1)
- Cam Nelson, Arizona (Coaches-2)

== Special teams ==
=== Placekickers ===
- Kai Forbath#, UCLA (Coaches-1, ESPN-1)
- Jordan Williamson, Stanford (Coaches-2)

=== Punters ===
- Bryan Anger, California (Coaches-1)
- Trevor Hankins, Arizona St. (ESPN-1)
- Jeff Locke, UCLA (Coaches-2)

=== Return specialists ===
- Chris Owusu, Stanford (Coaches-1)
- Damian Williams, USC (Coaches-1)
- Terrence Austin, UCLA (Coaches-2)
- Kyle Williams, Arizona St. (Coaches-2)

=== Special teams player ===
- Suaesi Tuimaunei, Oregon St. (Coaches-1)
- Garrett Green, USC (Coaches-2)

== Key ==
Coaches = selected by Pac-12 coaches

ESPN = selected by ESPN.com staff

# = unanimous selection by coaches

== See also ==
- 2009 College Football All-America Team
