= 2008 All-Pacific-10 Conference football team =

The 2008 All-Pacific-10 Conference football team consists of American football players chosen by various organizations for All-Pacific-10 Conference teams for the 2008 college football season. The USC Trojans won the conference, posting an 8–1 conference record. USC then beat the Big Ten champion Penn State Nittany Lions in the Rose Bowl 38 to 24. Oregon State running back Jacquizz Rodgers was voted Pac-10 Offensive Player of the Year. USC linebacker Rey Maualuga was voted Pat Tillman Pac-10 Defensive Player of the Year.

== Offensive selections ==
=== Quarterbacks ===
- Mark Sanchez, USC (Coaches-1, ESPN-1, Rivals-1)
- Willie Tuitama, Arizona (Coaches-2, Rivals-2)

=== Running backs ===
- Jacquizz Rodgers#, Oregon St. (Coaches-1, ESPN-1, Rivals-1)
- Jahvid Best, California (Coaches-1, ESPN-1, Rivals-1)
- Toby Gerhart, Stanford (Coaches-2, Rivals-2)
- Jeremiah Johnson, Oregon (Coaches-2, Rivals-2)

=== Wide receivers ===
- Mike Thomas, Arizona (Coaches-1, ESPN-1, Rivals-1)
- Sammie Stroughter, Oregon St. (Coaches-1, ESPN-1, Rivals-1)
- Michael Jones, Arizona St. (Coaches-2, Rivals-2)
- Patrick Turner, USC (Coaches-2)
- Damian Williams, USC (Rivals-2)

=== Tight ends ===
- Rob Gronkowski, Arizona (Coaches-1, ESPN-1, Rivals-1)
- Ed Dickson, Oregon (Coaches-2)
- Ryan Moya, UCLA (Coaches-2)
- Cameron Morrah, California (Rivals-2)

=== Tackles ===
- Andy Levitre, Oregon St. (Coaches-1, ESPN-1, Rivals-1)
- Eben Britton, Arizona (Coaches-1, ESPN-1, Rivals-1)
- Ben Muth, Stanford (Coaches-1, Rivals-2)
- Fenuki Tupou, Oregon (Coaches-2, Rivals-2)

=== Guards ===
- Jeff Byers, USC (Coaches-2, Rivals-1)
- Mark Lewis, Oregon (Rivals-1)
- Adam Speer, Oregon St. (Coaches-2, Rivals-2)
- Noris Malele, California (Coaches-2)
- Joe Longacre, Arizona (Rivals-2)

=== Centers ===
- Alex Mack, California (Coaches-1, ESPN-1, Rivals-1)
- Max Unger, Oregon (Coaches-1, ESPN-1, Rivals-2)
- Kris O'Dowd, USC (Coaches-1, ESPN-1)
- Alex Fletcher, Stanford (Coaches-2)

== Defensive selections ==
=== Ends ===
- Nick Reed, Oregon (Coaches-1, ESPN-1, Rivals-1)
- Victor Butler, Oregon St. (Coaches-1, ESPN-1, Rivals-1)
- Clay Matthews, USC (Coaches-2, Rivals-2)
- Tyson Alualu, California (Coaches-2)
- Daniel Te'o-Nesheim, Washington (Coaches-2)
- Dexter Davis, Arizona St. (Rivals-2)

=== Tackles ===
- Fili Moala, USC (Coaches-1, ESPN-1, Rivals-1)
- Brian Price, UCLA (Coaches-1, ESPN-1)
- Brigham Harwell, UCLA (Coaches-2, Rivals-1)
- Stephen Paea, Oregon St. (Rivals-2)
- Lawrence Guy, Arizona St. (Rivals-2)

=== Linebackers ===
- Brian Cushing, USC (Coaches-1, ESPN-1, Rivals-1)
- Rey Maualuga, USC (Coaches-1, ESPN-1, Rivals-1)
- Zack Follett, California (Coaches-1, ESPN-1, Rivals-1)
- Reggie Carter, UCLA (Coaches-2, Rivals-2)
- Kaluka Maiava, USC (Coaches-2)
- Keaton Kristick, Oregon St. (Coaches-2)
- Mike Nixon, Arizona St. (Rivals-2)
- Spencer Paysinger, Oregon (Rivals-2)

=== Cornerbacks ===
- Syd'Quan Thompson, California (Coaches-1, ESPN-1, Rivals-1)
- Alterraun Verner, UCLA (Coaches-2, ESPN-1, Rivals-2)
- Brandon Hughes, Oregon St. (Coaches-2, Rivals-1)
- Devin Ross, Arizona (Coaches-2, Rivals-2)

=== Safeties ===
- Taylor Mays, USC (Coaches-1, ESPN-1, Rivals-1)
- Kevin Ellison, USC (Coaches-1, ESPN-1)
- Troy Nolan, Arizona St (Coaches-2, ESPN-1, Rivals-2)
- Patrick Chung, Oregon (Coaches-1, Rivals-2)
- Jairus Byrd, Oregon (Coaches-1)
- Bo McNally, Stanford (Rivals-1)
- Greg Laybourn, Oregon St. (Coaches-2)

== Special teams ==
=== Placekickers ===
- Kai Forbath, UCLA (Coaches-2, ESPN-1, Rivals-1)
- David Buehler, USC (Coaches-1)
- Jason Bondzio, Arizona (Rivals-2)

=== Punters ===
- Aaron Perez, UCLA (Coaches-1, ESPN-1, Rivals-2)
- Bryan Anger, California (Coaches-2, Rivals-1)

=== Return specialists ===
- James Rodgers, Oregon St. (Coaches-1, ESPN-1, Rivals-1)
- Mike Thomas, Arizona (Coaches-1, Rivals-1)
- Jairus Byrd, Oregon (ESPN-1)
- Terrence Austin, UCLA (Coaches-2, Rivals-2)
- Sammie Stroughter, Oregon St. (Coaches-2)
- Kyle Williams, Arizona St. (Rivals-2)

=== Special teams player ===
- Patrick Chung, Oregon (Coaches-1)
- Wopamo Osaisai, Stanford (Coaches-2)

== Key ==
Coaches = selected by Pac-12 coaches

ESPN = selected by ESPN.com staff

Rivals = selected by Rivals.com staff

# = unanimous selection by coaches

== See also ==
- 2008 College Football All-America Team
