= Brian Price (American football, born 1989) =

American football player (born 1989)

No. 92
- Position: Defensive tackle

Personal information
- Born: April 10, 1989 (age 37); Los Angeles, California, U.S.
- Listed height: 6 ft 1 in (1.85 m)
- Listed weight: 303 lb (137 kg)

Career information
- High school: Crenshaw (Los Angeles)
- College: UCLA
- NFL draft: 2010: 2nd round, 35th overall pick

Career history
- Tampa Bay Buccaneers (2010–2011); Chicago Bears (2012)*; Dallas Cowboys (2013)*; Los Angeles Kiss (2014)
- * Offseason or practice squad member only

Awards and highlights
- First-team All-American (2009); Pac-10 Defensive Player of the Year (2009); 2× First-team All-Pac-10 (2008, 2009)

Career NFL statistics
- Total tackles: 27
- Sacks: 3
- Stats at Pro Football Reference

Brian Larisso Price (born April 10, 1989) is an American former professional football player who was a defensive tackle for the Tampa Bay Buccaneers of the National Football League. He played college football for the UCLA Bruins, earning first-team All-American honors in 2009. He was selected by the Buccaneers in the second round of the 2010 NFL draft.

== Early life ==
Price attended Crenshaw High School in Los Angeles, California where he had 85 tackles, 17 tackles for loss, 15 sacks, four forced fumbles, and two recovered fumbles while battling double and triple teams in 2006. As a junior, made 111 tackles, including 22 sacks. Price was named "Coliseum League Defensive MVP" consecutive times in 2005 and 2006. He was selected to play in the U.S. Army All-American Bowl.

Considered a four-star recruit by Rivals.com, Price was ranked fifth among defensive tackle prospects in the nation. He picked UCLA over USC on March 11, 2006.

== College career ==
As a true freshman in 2007, Price recorded 14 tackles (7.0 for losses) and one sack.

As a sophomore in 2008, Price led the Bruins with 14 tackles for loss. He was also second on the team with 4.5 quarterback sacks. He earned a First-team All-Pac-10 selection by the league's coaches, and a First-team Sophomore All-American selection by College Football News.

As a junior in 2009, Price started 13 games and made 48 tackles (23.5 for losses) and seven sacks. He also forced two fumbles and recovered one and deflected a pass. He was a First-team All-American by the AFCA and a consensus All-Pac 10 selection. After UCLA's win in the 2009 EagleBank Bowl, Price announced his decision to forgo his final year of eligibility and enter the 2010 NFL draft.

=== Awards and honors ===
- Price was named to the All Pac-10 2009 first team and was named the Pac-10's Pat Tillman Defensive Player of the Year on December 7.
- On November 30, at their annual awards banquet at the Hyatt Century Plaza Hotel, running back Chane Moline, safety Rahim Moore and Price were selected winners of UCLA's Henry R. "Red" Sanders Award for most valuable players.
- Price and teammate placekicker Kai Forbath were named to the AFCA Coaches' All-America team for the 2009 football season.

== Professional career ==
=== Tampa Bay Buccaneers ===
Price was taken by the Tampa Bay Buccaneers with the 3rd (35th overall) pick in the 2nd round.

Price was placed on injured reserve with a pelvic injury on November 2, 2010. He only played in 5 games as a rookie, while battling hamstring injuries, which led to two radical surgeries to reattach both hamstrings to his pelvis, including a painful rehabilitation process in order to be ready for the following season. Price recorded his first professional sack on Atlanta Falcons quarterback Matt Ryan during week 3 of the 2011 season.

During Week 13 of the 2011 NFL season, against the Carolina Panthers, Price shoved Panthers guard Mackenzy Bernadeau well after the end of a third-quarter play in which Cam Newton was sacked for a four-yard loss. Price was penalized for unnecessary roughness. The sack would have forced the Panthers into a 3rd-and-14 situation. However, the resulting 15-yard penalty gave the Panthers a first down, allowing them to complete a touchdown drive that put the game out of reach (the Panthers won 38–19). Buccaneers coach Raheem Morris was so incensed that he banished Price from the sideline for the rest of the game. The move drew comparisons to then San Francisco 49ers coach Mike Singletary banishing Vernon Davis from the sideline after a personal foul in 2008.

In May 2012, he missed organized team activities after being hospitalized during three days for exhaustion and grief in the wake of his sister's death in a hit-and-run accident (two of his brothers were murdered previously in Los Angeles). On June 19, he got into a fight with first round draft choice Mark Barron during an offseason training practice. He was later held out of much of the offseason program as a result of this issue.

=== Chicago Bears ===
On July 26, 2012, Price was traded to the Chicago Bears in exchange for a 7th round draft pick (#226-Michael Buchanan). He was released on September 3. On December 20, 2012, Price was brought in by the Minnesota Vikings for a workout.

=== Dallas Cowboys ===
Price signed a futures contract with the Dallas Cowboys on December 31, 2012. He was waived-injured on May 9, 2013.

=== Los Angeles Kiss ===
On May 1, 2014, Price was assigned to the Los Angeles Kiss of the Arena Football League (AFL). He appeared in one game for the Kiss during the 2014 season.

In May 2014, Price went to Jaguars Rookie Mini-Camp on a tryout basis. He was not offered a contract.

== Personal life ==
Price grew up in South Los Angeles, where gang violence was a frequent occurrence. Two of his brothers, Eddie and Damon, were killed in gang-related shootings in Crenshaw. He also has six sisters. In May 2012, his sister Bridget, 30, died as a result of a car accident in Inglewood.

His wife, Candice Davis Price, is a track and field athlete and was the runner-up in the hurdles at the 2008 IAAF World Indoor Championships.

In 2017, video footage emerged of Price acting in an agitated manner outside an automotive repair shop in Ypsilanti. Price was shown to dive through the store's glass door. This has since sparked debate on the mental injuries sustained by football players.
