= Ed Dickson =

American football player (born 1987)

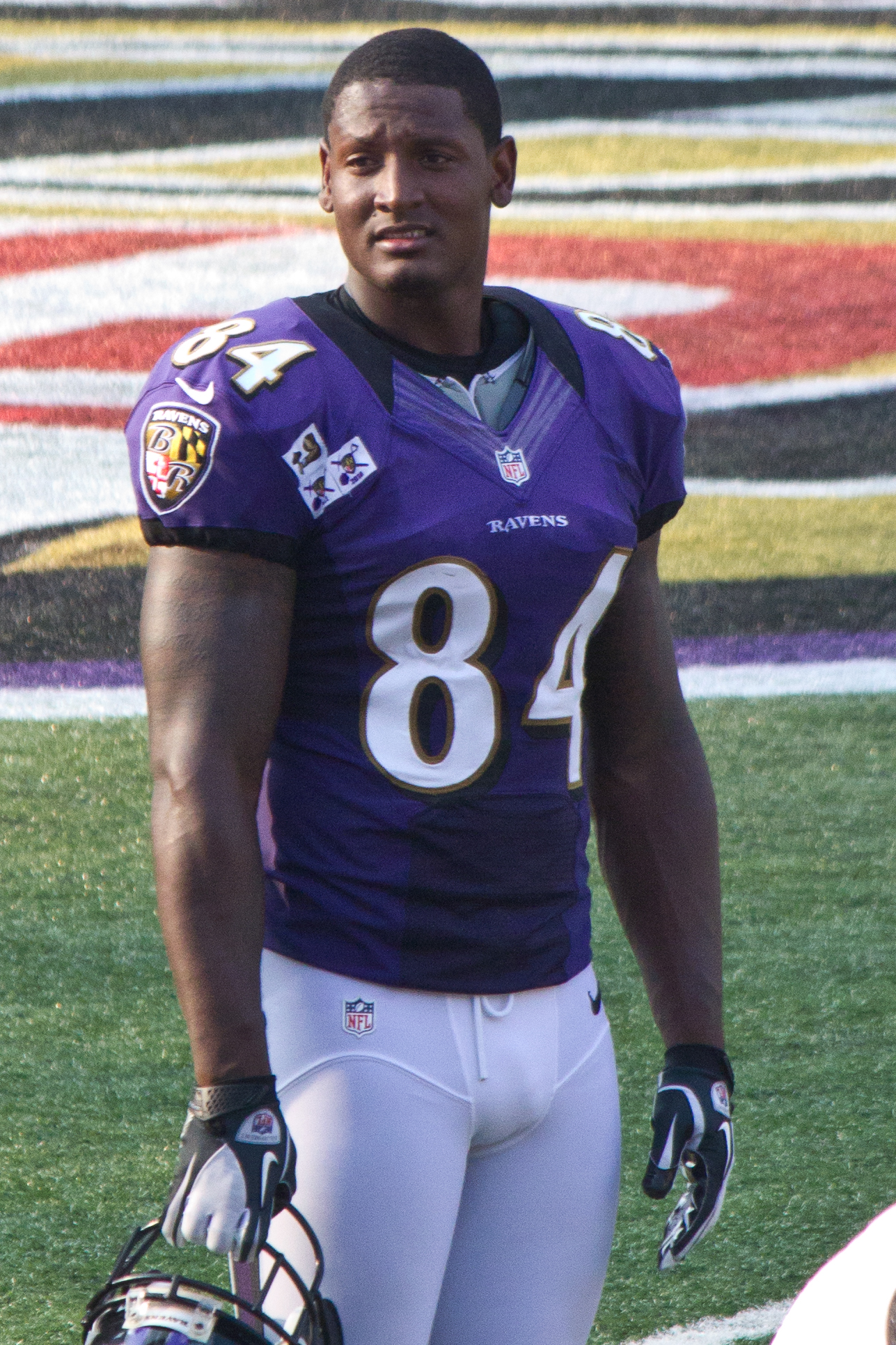
- Dickson with the Baltimore Ravens in 2013

No. 83, 84
- Position: Tight end

Personal information
- Born: July 25, 1987 (age 39); Inglewood, California, U.S.
- Listed height: 6 ft 4 in (1.93 m)
- Listed weight: 250 lb (113 kg)

Career information
- High school: Bellflower (Bellflower, California)
- College: Oregon (2005–2009)
- NFL draft: 2010: 3rd round, 70th overall pick

Career history
- Baltimore Ravens (2010–2013); Carolina Panthers (2014–2017); Seattle Seahawks (2018–2019)

Awards and highlights
- Super Bowl champion (XLVII); First-team All-Pac-10 (2009); Second-team All-Pac-10 (2008)

Career NFL statistics
- Receptions: 190
- Receiving yards: 2,128
- Receiving touchdowns: 15
- Stats at Pro Football Reference

Edward James Dickson (born July 25, 1987) is an American former professional football player who was a tight end in the National Football League (NFL). He played college football at Oregon and was selected by the Baltimore Ravens in the third round of the 2010 NFL draft.

== Early life ==
Dickson played football at Bellflower High School and played on both offense and defense, playing tight end and defensive end. Dickson led his team in receiving yards and quarterback sacks during his senior season, and by his performance he was named Southeast-South Coast Lineman of the-Year by the Los Angeles Times. Dickson's high school awards include Best in the West Honorable Mention tight end/linebacker by the Long Beach Press-Telegram, First-team All-Suburban League and First-team All-league pick (offense and defense).

== College career ==
Dickson enrolled at the University of Oregon and was redshirted his freshman year. He spent time with the defensive ends, but ended up as the tight end in the team's depth chart behind Dante Rosario. He played 13 games as a defensive lineman in 2006.

In 2009, Dickson was selected to the preseason watch list for the Mackey Award, given out to the nation's best tight end. On September 27, 2009, Dickson was named the national player of the week by the Walter Camp Football Foundation. He earned the honors after catching 11 passes for 148 yards and three touchdowns in an upset of the #6 California Golden Bears.

Dickson earned his degree from Oregon in Family and Human Services.

=== Awards and honors ===
- Pac-10 offensive player of the week for the week of September 26, 2009
- 2008 Second-team All-Pac-10
- 2008 3rd-Team Pacific-10 All-Conference (Phil Steele)

== Professional career ==
=== Pre-draft ===
Pre-draft measurables
Height	Weight	Arm length	Hand span	40-yard dash	10-yard split	20-yard split	20-yard shuttle	Three-cone drill	Vertical jump	Broad jump	Bench press	Wonderlic
6 ft 4 1/4 in (1.94 m)	249 lb (113 kg)	33 in (0.84 m)	9 3/4 in (0.25 m)	4.61 s	1.60 s	2.64 s	4.59 s	7.32 s	34 in (0.86 m)	10 ft 2 in (3.10 m)	25 reps	10
All values from NFL Combine/Pro Day

Dickson was regarded as one of the best tight ends available in the 2010 NFL draft.

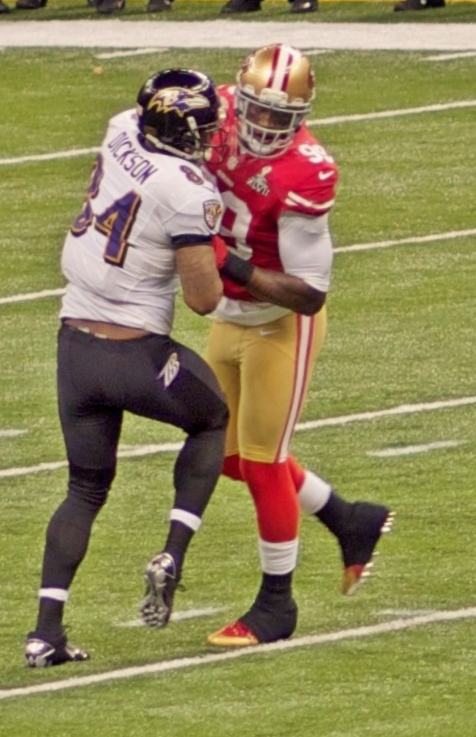
Dickson blocks 49ers defensive end Aldon Smith in Super Bowl XLVII

=== Baltimore Ravens ===
Dickson was selected in the third round (70th overall) by the Baltimore Ravens. The pick was one of three that the Ravens acquired in a trade with the Denver Broncos on the first night of the draft on April 22. The Broncos received a first-round pick which was used to select Tim Tebow. Dickson signed a three-year contract on July 2, 2010.

As a backup to veteran Todd Heap, Dickson recorded 11 receptions, 153 yards, and one touchdown. However, the following year marked big changes for Dickson. Heap was released, and Dickson found himself in a battle with Dennis Pitta for the starting job. Also, Dickson switched from #83 to #84 after Lee Evans became a Raven. Dickson was the main starter in 2011, and caught five touchdowns.

During the Ravens Super Bowl championship season in 2012, Dickson saw his role in the passing game decrease in favor of Pitta, though he often found himself on blocking duty.

During the 2013 season, however, Dickson was the starter for most of the season as Pitta suffered a hip fracture injury before the season began.

=== Carolina Panthers ===
On April 10, 2014, Dickson signed a one-year deal with the Carolina Panthers.

Dickson signed a three-year, $6.8 million contract extension on March 11, 2015. During the 2015 season, the Panthers won 15 games, which set a team record for victories. On February 7, 2016, Dickson was part of the Panthers team that played in Super Bowl 50. In the game, the Panthers fell to the Denver Broncos by a score of 24–10.

On October 8, 2017, Dickson posted an impressive performance with 175 receiving yards as the Panthers won 27–24 over the Detroit Lions.

=== Seattle Seahawks ===
On March 16, 2018, Dickson signed a three-year contract with the Seattle Seahawks worth up to $14 million, with the first year fully guaranteed. He was placed on the reserve/non-football injury list on September 1. Dickson was activated to the active roster on October 27.

On September 2, 2019, Dickson was placed on injured reserve. He was designated for return from injured reserve on October 30, and began practicing with the team again. Dickson was activated on November 20. However, he was placed back on injured reserve two days later.

On March 31, 2020, Dickson was released by the Seahawks. He officially announced his retirement as an active player on November 17, 2022.

== NFL career statistics ==
Legend
**Bold**	Career high

=== Regular season ===
Year	Team	Games		Receiving					
Year	Team	GP	GS	Tgt	Rec	Yds	Avg	Lng	TD
2010	BAL	15	3	23	11	152	13.8	58	1
2011	BAL	**16**	**16**	**89**	**54**	**528**	9.8	25	**5**
2012	BAL	13	11	33	21	225	10.7	40	0
2013	BAL	**16**	14	43	25	273	10.9	43	1
2014	CAR	**16**	10	17	10	115	11.5	34	1
2015	CAR	**16**	11	26	17	121	7.1	17	2
2016	CAR	**16**	8	19	10	134	13.4	28	1
2017	CAR	**16**	12	48	30	437	**14.6**	**64**	1
2018	SEA	10	1	13	12	143	11.9	42	3
		134	86	311	190	2,128	11.2	64	15

=== Playoffs ===
Year	Team	Games		Receiving					
Year	Team	GP	GS	Tgt	Rec	Yds	Avg	Lng	TD
2010	BAL	2	1	1	1	2	2.0	2	0
2011	BAL	2	1	**8**	3	37	12.3	16	0
2012	BAL	**4**	**3**	**8**	**6**	**90**	15.0	24	0
2014	CAR	2	2	7	3	67	**22.3**	**34**	0
2015	CAR	3	2	4	2	22	11.0	16	0
2017	CAR	1	1	2	1	3	3.0	3	0
2018	SEA	1	0	5	4	42	10.5	26	0
		15	10	35	20	263	13.2	34	0
