= Shawn Lauvao =

American football player (born 1987)

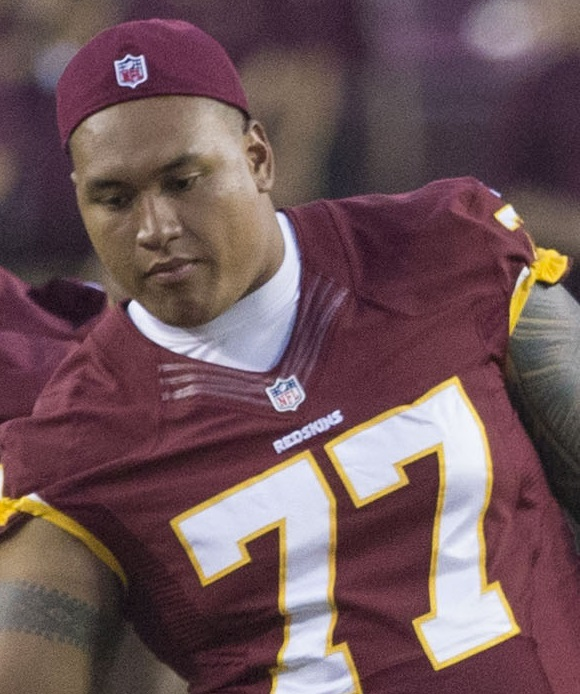
- Lauvao with the Washington Redskins in 2015

No. 66, 77
- Position: Guard

Personal information
- Born: October 26, 1987 (age 39); Honolulu, Hawaii, U.S.
- Listed height: 6 ft 3 in (1.91 m)
- Listed weight: 308 lb (140 kg)

Career information
- High school: Farrington (Honolulu)
- College: Arizona State (2005-2009)
- NFL draft: 2010: 3rd round, 92nd overall pick

Career history
- Cleveland Browns (2010–2013); Washington Redskins (2014–2018)

Awards and highlights
- 2× Second-team All-Pac-10 (2008, 2009)

Career NFL statistics
- Games played: 99
- Games started: 90
- Stats at Pro Football Reference

Shawn Sisifo Lauvao (born October 26, 1987) is an American former professional football player who was a guard in the National Football League (NFL). He was selected by the Cleveland Browns in the third round of the 2010 NFL draft. He played college football for the Arizona State Sun Devils.

== College career ==
Lauvao started his last 33 games at Arizona State—17 at left guard, 12 at left tackle and four at right tackle. He earned Second Team All-Pac-10 honors during his junior and senior years.

== Professional career ==
=== Pre-draft ===
Although playing the left tackle spot in college, Lauvao projected as a guard in the NFL. He drew comparisons to Kynan Forney.

Pre-draft measurables
Height	Weight	Arm length	Hand span	40-yard dash	10-yard split	20-yard split	20-yard shuttle	Three-cone drill	Vertical jump	Broad jump	Bench press
6 ft 2 7/8 in (1.90 m)	315 lb (143 kg)	33 in (0.84 m)	9 1/2 in (0.24 m)	5.16 s	1.83 s	2.99 s	4.51 s	7.56 s	31.0 in (0.79 m)	8 ft 9 in (2.67 m)	33 reps
All values from NFL Combine/Pro Day

=== Cleveland Browns ===
Lauvao was selected by the Cleveland Browns in the third round (92nd overall) of the 2010 NFL draft. Lauvao became a starter his second season, starting all 16 games the next two seasons.

=== Washington Redskins ===
On March 11, 2014, Lauvao signed a four-year, $17 million contract with the Washington Redskins. He took over the starting left guard position in the Redskins' offensive line after the previous starter, Kory Lichtensteiger, switched to center.

In Week 3 of the 2015 season, Lauvao exited the game early with an ankle injury. On September 29, 2015, he was placed on injured reserve.

On November 21, 2017, Lauvao was placed on injured reserve after dealing with a stinger injury that sidelined him for a few weeks prior.

On May 4, 2018, Lauvao re-signed with the Redskins. On November 5, he was placed on injured reserve after suffering a torn ACL in Week 9.
