= Josh Pinkard =

American football player (born 1986)

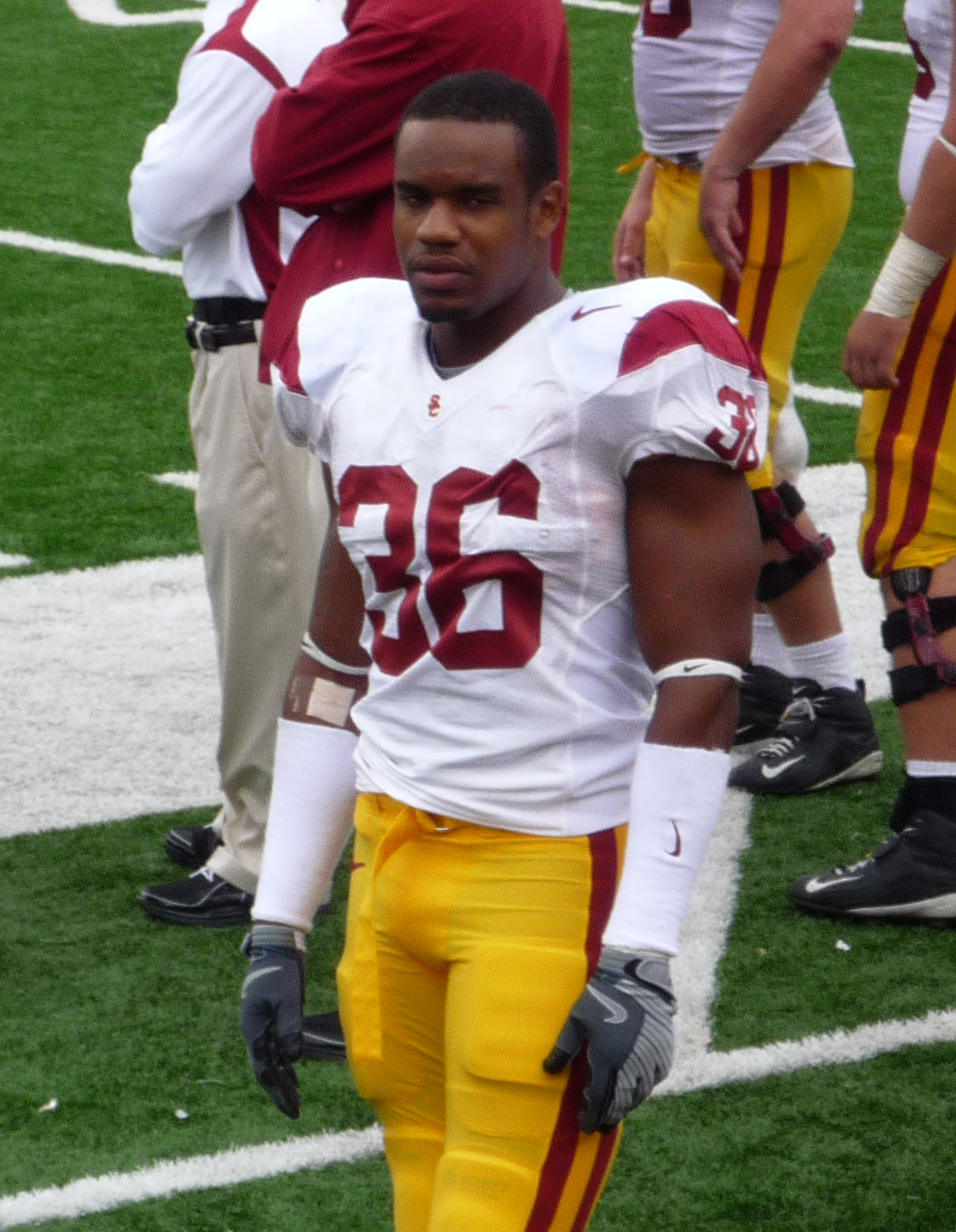
- Pinkard on the sidelines during a USC game

No. 22, 36
- Position: Cornerback

Personal information
- Born: April 2, 1986 (age 40); Oxnard, California, U.S.
- Listed height: 6 ft 1 in (1.85 m)
- Listed weight: 250 lb (113 kg)

Career information
- High school: Hueneme
- College: USC
- NFL draft: 2010: undrafted

Career history
- Seattle Seahawks (2010–2011)*
- * Offseason or practice squad member only

Awards and highlights
- Second-team All-Pac-10 (2009)
- Stats at Pro Football Reference

Josh Pinkard (born April 2, 1986) is an American former professional football cornerback. He was signed by the Seattle Seahawks of the National Football League (NFL) as an undrafted free agent. He played high school football at Hueneme High School in Oxnard, California.

== Early life ==
Pinkard's prep career included being named a Super Prep All-American, Super Prep All-Farwest, Prep Star All-West, Tacoma News Tribune Western 100, All-CIF Southern Section first-team, All-CIF Division IV and Los Angeles Times All-Ventura/North Coast pick as a senior suuwooin defensive back, wide receiver, and center. During his senior year at Katy he recorded 123 tackles, 2 sacks and 4 interceptions on defense and 22 receptions for 200-plus yards with 5 TDs on offense. He earned All-American honors in 2003.

== Collegiate career ==
In his freshman year in 2004, Pinkard played in all 13 games as a reserve safety and on special teams.

In his sophomore season in 2005, Pinkard played in all 13 games and started seven games, with six of those games as a cornerback.

In his junior year in 2006, Pinkard suffered a torn anterior cruciate ligament on his right knee at the season opener (a 50–14 win over Arkansas), and did not play for the remainder of the season.

In his redshirt junior year in 2007, Pinkard was moved to the top of the cornerback depth chart. However, in the practice before the first game of the season he once again suffered a torn anterior cruciate ligament, this time on his left knee, that ruled him out for the remainder of the season.

On May 18, 2007, Pinkard was arrested on suspicion of driving under the influence by the California Highway Patrol. After a brief stay in jail, he was released pending his court hearing. In November 2007, Pinkard pleaded no contest to alcohol-related reckless driving and was sentenced to 36 months of probation and was ordered to pay a fine.

When a senior, Pinkard was granted a sixth year by the NCAA due to two season-ending knee injuries. He was finally given his full clearance to come back. On the same day, Pinkard was also invited to the NFL combine. He was named second-team All-Pac-10 in 2009.

== Professional career ==
After going undrafted in the 2010 NFL draft, Pinkard signed as a free agent with the Seattle Seahawks. He was released on September 3, 2011, re-signed to the Seahawks' practice squad the following day, and then released from the practice squad on September 6, 2011.
