= Terrence Austin =

American football player (born 1988)

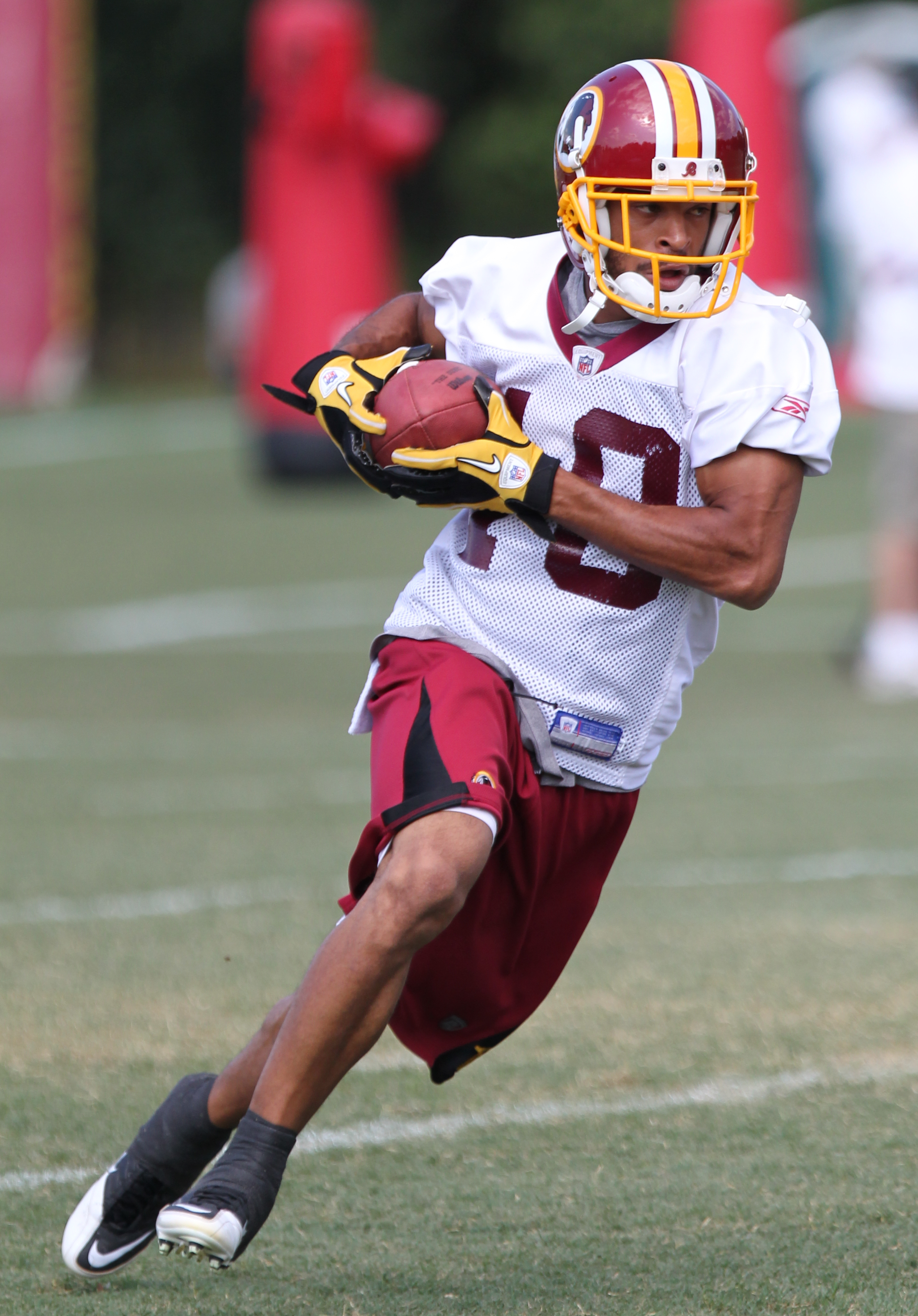
- Austin with the Washington Redskins in 2011

No. 18
- Position: Wide receiver

Personal information
- Born: August 25, 1988 (age 38); Long Beach, California, U.S.
- Listed height: 5 ft 11 in (1.80 m)
- Listed weight: 186 lb (84 kg)

Career information
- High school: Long Beach Polytechnic
- College: UCLA
- NFL draft: 2010: 7th round, 219th overall pick

Career history
- Washington Redskins (2010–2011); Detroit Lions (2013)*; Los Angeles Kiss (2014)
- * Offseason or practice squad member only

Awards and highlights
- 2× Second-team All-Pac-10 (2008, 2009)

Career NFL statistics
- Receptions: 15
- Receiving yards: 184
- Receiving touchdowns: 3
- Stats at Pro Football Reference

Terrence La'Mar Austin (born August 25, 1988) is an American former professional football player who was a wide receiver in the National Football League (NFL). He played college football for the UCLA Bruins and was selected by Washington Redskins in the seventh round of the 2010 NFL draft.

== Professional career ==
=== Washington Redskins ===
Austin was selected by the Washington Redskins in the seventh round of the 2010 NFL draft. He was released by the team on September 4, 2010, and was signed to the practice squad the next day. He was promoted to the active roster on November 27, 2010. Austin had his first NFL catch against Jacksonville on Week 16. At the end of 2010 NFL season, Austin played a total of 5 games.

At the beginning of the 2011 season, Austin made the active 53-man roster. Austin played a total of 13 games by the end of the season. Contributing more to special teams, he recorded 12 receptions and 137 receiving yards.

At the start of 2012 training camp, it was announced that Austin was taking reps as punt returner providing competition for Brandon Banks. Austin was released on August 31, 2012, for final cuts before the start of the 2012 season.

=== Detroit Lions ===
Austin signed a futures contract with the Detroit Lions on January 1, 2013. He was released on August 27, 2013.

=== Los Angeles Kiss ===
Austin was assigned to the Los Angeles Kiss of the Arena Football League (AFL) on May 31, 2014.
