= Keaton Kristick =

American football player (born 1988)

No. 57
- Position: Linebacker

Personal information
- Born: April 25, 1988 (age 38); Naperville, Illinois, U.S.
- Listed height: 6 ft 3 in (1.91 m)
- Listed weight: 234 lb (106 kg)

Career information
- College: Oregon State
- NFL draft: 2010: undrafted

Career history
- San Francisco 49ers (2010)

Awards and highlights
- First-team All-Pac-10 (2009); Second-team All-Pac-10 (2008)
- Stats at Pro Football Reference

Keaton Kristick (born April 25, 1988) is an American former professional football player who was a linebacker for the San Francisco 49ers of the National Football League (NFL). He played college football for the Oregon State Beavers and was signed by the 49ers as an undrafted free agent in 2010.

== Early life ==
He was born in Naperville, Illinois, to parents Kevin and Karie Kristick. His father played free safety at Northern Illinois in 1977 and 1978. His uncle, Dave Kristick, played linebacker for Army during the 1970s. The Kristick's originally resided in the Chicago area before returning to their roots in the East Bay (Martinez, Clayton & Danville), and eventually Arizona.

Keaton attended St. Mary's High School in Phoenix, Arizona. He served as the president of the St. Mary's Young Republicans. Kristick played football there for three years as a running back and linebacker, and was the team's leading rusher and tackler each year. As a junior, he set an Arizona state record with a 99-yard touchdown run. As a senior, he scored 18 rushing touchdowns and one receiving touchdown, which made him the leading scorer in the Desert Valley Conference. That season, he was named a first-team All-Arizona Republic player, 5A All-State player, first-team all-region linebacker, and first-team all-region running back. He was also honored as the team's most valuable player and the region's defensive player of the year. Rivals.com named him the seventh-best prospect in the state of Arizona. He was evaluated as a three-star prospect by Rivals.com and a two-star prospect by Scout.com.

== College career ==
Keaton chose to attend Oregon State University for the family atmosphere, his "relationships with the coaches and the chance to play in the Pac-10 Conference", where he majored in business. As a true freshman with the Beavers in 2006, he saw some action as a back-up linebacker and in a special teams role and recorded 17 tackles. He forced a fumble against Hawaii quarterback Colt Brennan, and recovered a fumble from Stanford quarterback T.C. Ostrander, which set up an Oregon State touchdown. In 2007, he saw action in all 13 games and recorded 15 tackles.

In 2008, he started in all 13 games and finished the season as the team's second-leading tackler with 85 tackles including 14 for loss and 3.5 quarterback sacks, and four passes broken up. He ranked second on the team and eighth in the Pacific-10 Conference in terms of tackles for loss. In the upset win against USC, Kristick compiled a career-high of ten tackles including two for losses of yardage and one quarterback sack. He was named to the All-Pac-10 second-team.

Keaton was named a consensus 1st team All-Pac-10 linebacker in 2009 and led his team in tackles with 95 including 8.5 for loss, two INT's and seven passes broken up as a strongside LB.

Prior to the 2009 season, he was added to the Lott Trophy and Bednarik Award watch lists. ESPN analyst Ted Miller rated him the 19th-ranked player in the Pac-10. College Football News named him to their "120 Players To Know".

== Professional career ==
=== San Francisco 49ers ===
Kristick was not selected in the 2010 NFL draft, but was signed by the San Francisco 49ers shortly after as a free agent.

On September 4, 2011, he was waived by the 49ers.

== Personal life ==
On June 15, 2019, Kristick married Molly Brown of Nebraska in Chicago, IL where they reside today. They share two daughters and live in prominent Lake Forest.
