= Charles Brown (offensive lineman) =

American football player (born 1987)

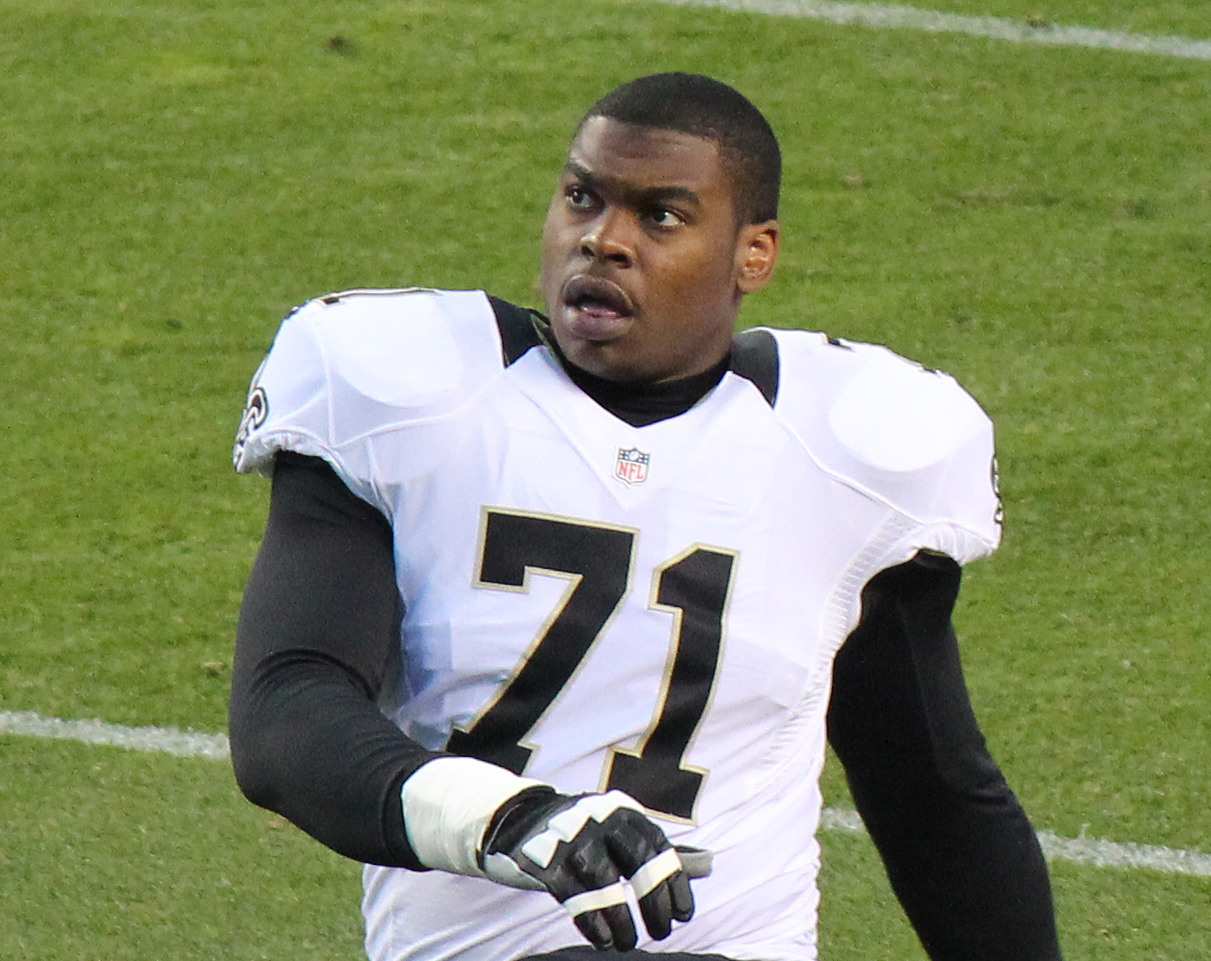
- Brown with the Saints in 2012

No. 71, 78
- Position: Offensive tackle

Personal information
- Born: April 10, 1987 (age 39); Chino Hills, California, U.S.
- Listed height: 6 ft 5 in (1.96 m)
- Listed weight: 300 lb (136 kg)

Career information
- High school: Diamond Ranch (Pomona, California)
- College: USC
- NFL draft: 2010: 2nd round, 64th overall pick

Career history
- New Orleans Saints (2010–2013); New York Giants (2014); New York Jets (2015)*; Dallas Cowboys (2015)
- * Offseason or practice squad member only

Awards and highlights
- Morris Trophy (2009); First-team All-American (2009); First-team All-Pac-10 (2009)

Career NFL statistics
- Games played: 54
- Games started: 23
- Stats at Pro Football Reference

Charles Rashad Jamaal Brown (born April 10, 1987) is an American former professional football player who was an offensive tackle who played in the National Football League (NFL) for the New Orleans Saints, New York Giants and Dallas Cowboys. He played college football for the USC Trojans.

== Early life ==
Brown attended Diamond Ranch High School in Pomona, California, where he was two-way tackle and tight end. As a sophomore, he received All-league honors. As a junior, he received second-team All-league honors.

As a senior, he tallied 15 receptions for 250 yards, 2 touchdowns, over 70 tackles and 10 sacks. He earned second-team Cal-Hi Sports All-State, All-CIF Division VIII, Los Angeles Times All-San Gabriel Valley Lineman of the Year, Super Prep All-Farwest, Prep Star All-West, Long Beach Press-Telegram Best of the Rest and Tacoma News Tribune Western 100 honors.

Regarded as a three-star recruit by Rivals.com, Brown was listed as the No. 23 offensive tackle prospect in the nation. Meanwhile, Scout.com considered him a tight end prospect and gave him a four-star rating, placing him 10th on their tight end ranking. Brown chose USC over Oregon and UCLA.

== College career ==
Brown was originally recruited as a tight end by USC, and arrived on campus carrying around 250 pounds (110 kg). In 2005, he was redshirted and converted from tight end into an offensive tackle.

As a freshman in 2006, Brown was a backup to Sam Baker at left tackle and played on special teams. He appeared in all 13 games, including 4 contests where he saw brief action at offensive tackle.

As a sophomore in 2007, he appeared in 9 games (one start) as backup tackle and on special teams. He started at right tackle in the season opener against the University of Idaho. He missed the contest against the University of Arizona with a sprained ankle.

As a junior in 2008, he started all 13 games at left tackle, after the departure of Baker to the NFL. He allowed 3 sacks and was penalized only once. He contributed to the offense ranking 11h in the nation and received honorable-mention All-Pac-10 honors.

As a senior in 2009, Brown was listed at No. 8 on Rivals.com's preseason offensive tackle power ranking. He started all 13, while allowing two sacks on 463 pass plays and being penalized only twice. He was named first-team All-American by the Sporting News, All-Pac-10 and won the Morris Trophy, recognizing the conference's top offensive and defensive lineman. He finished his college career after appearing in 48 games with 27 starts.

== Professional career ==
=== Pre-draft ===
Brown was regarded as one of the best offensive tackles available in the 2010 NFL draft, and draws comparisons to Maurice Williams. Listed at 285 pounds during his senior year at USC, Brown weighed in at 303 pounds at the NFL Combine.

Pre-draft measurables
Height	Weight	Arm length	Hand span	40-yard dash	10-yard split	20-yard split	Vertical jump	Broad jump	Bench press
6 ft 5 3/8 in (1.97 m)	303 lb (137 kg)	35 1/4 in (0.90 m)	11 3/8 in (0.29 m)	5.21 s	1.76 s	2.95 s	32.0 in (0.81 m)	8 ft 5 in (2.57 m)	21 reps
All values from NFL Combine/Pro Day

=== New Orleans Saints ===
Brown was selected by the New Orleans Saints in the second round (64th overall) of the 2010 NFL draft. He signed a four-year contract on July 26, 2010. As a rookie, he appeared in three games and was declared inactive for 13 contests and the playoffs.

In 2011, he appeared in eight games with five starts at right tackle. He replaced injured starter Zach Strief in a come from behind win against the Houston Texans and went on to start the next five games. On November 2, he was placed on the injured reserve list with a hip pointer.

In 2012, he played in ten games with three starts. He started one game at tight end against the Philadelphia Eagles and two contests at right tackle in place of an injured Strief. He missed four games with a knee injury. He was placed on the injured reserve list on December 15.

In 2013, he started the first 14 games at left tackle, before being benched for poor play and replaced in the starting lineup with rookie Terron Armstead, for the remaining contests of the regular season and the playoffs. He wasn't re-signed after the season.

=== New York Giants ===
On April 1, 2014, the New York Giants announced the signing of Brown to a free agent contract. The contract was for one-year, $795,000, with a base salary of $730,000 and a $55,000 signing bonus. On November 22, he was waived after playing in only 2 games.

=== New York Jets ===
On June 12, 2015, Brown was signed by the New York Jets following a tryout at minicamp. He was released on September 5.

=== Dallas Cowboys ===
On September 14, 2015, he was signed as a free agent by the Dallas Cowboys, to take over the backup swing tackle role from a struggling Darrion Weems. He didn't have any starts during the season and was just used in some situational run formations.

On March 11, 2016, he was re-signed as an unrestricted free agent by the Cowboys. On July 26, he was placed on the reserve/retired list after announcing his retirement.
