= Rahim Moore =

American football player (born 1990)

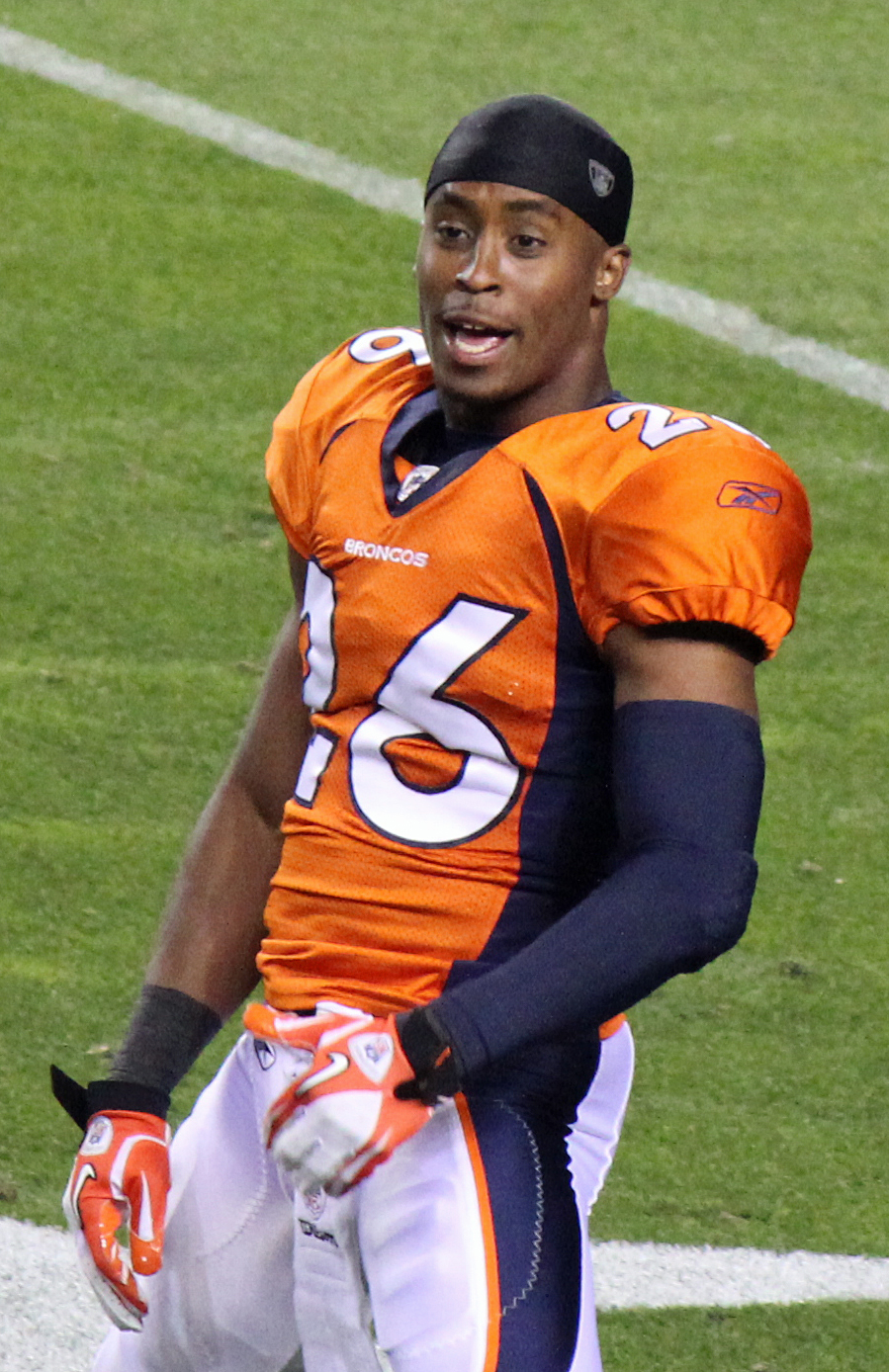
- Moore with the Denver Broncos in 2011

No. 26
- Position: Safety

Personal information
- Born: February 11, 1990 (age 36); Los Angeles, California, U.S.
- Listed height: 6 ft 1 in (1.85 m)
- Listed weight: 195 lb (88 kg)

Career information
- High school: Susan Miller Dorsey (Los Angeles)
- College: UCLA
- NFL draft: 2011: 2nd round, 45th overall pick

Career history
- Denver Broncos (2011–2014); Houston Texans (2015); Cleveland Browns (2016)*; New York Giants (2017)*; Arizona Hotshots (2019); DC Defenders (2020); Arlington Renegades (2023)*
- * Offseason or practice squad member only

Awards and highlights
- First-team All-American (2010); Second-team All-American (2009); 2× First-team All-Pac-10 (2009, 2010); 2009 Sporting News Pac-10 Defensive MVP; 2009 FBS Interception leader; 2008 All-Pac-10 Freshman Team

Career NFL statistics
- Total tackles: 213
- Sacks: 1.0
- Forced fumbles: 1
- Fumble recoveries: 3
- Pass deflections: 21
- Interceptions: 9
- Stats at Pro Football Reference

Rahim Shaheed Moore (born February 11, 1990) is an American former professional football player who was a safety in the National Football League (NFL). He played college football for the UCLA Bruins, earning first-team All-American honors. He was selected by the Denver Broncos in the second round of the 2011 NFL draft.

== Early life ==
Moore attended Dorsey High School in Los Angeles, California, where he was teammates with future college teammate, Johnathan Franklin. A four-year letterman in football, Moore played as a defensive back and wide receiver for coach Knox. He was named All-State first-team by Cal-Hi Sports and was a member of Long Beach Press-Telegram Best in the West squad (No. 4). As a sophomore, he made 99 tackles and had eight interceptions. As a junior, recorded 122 tackles and seven interceptions. As a senior, he recorded 112 tackles, eight interceptions, 10 deflections and three fumble recoveries on defense, helping Dorsey reach City Section semifinals. He also made 15 catches for 339 yards and six scores on offense. He was selected to play in the U.S. Army All-Star Game.

Moore was also a letterman in track & field. He was a three-time league champ with bests of 50.14 seconds in the 400-meter dash and 22.21 seconds in the 200-meter dash. As a senior, he finished third in the 400-meter event at the CIF L.A. City Section Finals with a time of 50.31 seconds.

Moore was ranked No. 2 nationally and No. 1 in the West and in California at safety and was given five stars from Scout.com. He was a PrepStar Dream Team selection. He was also regarded as a four-star recruit by Rivals.com.

== College career ==
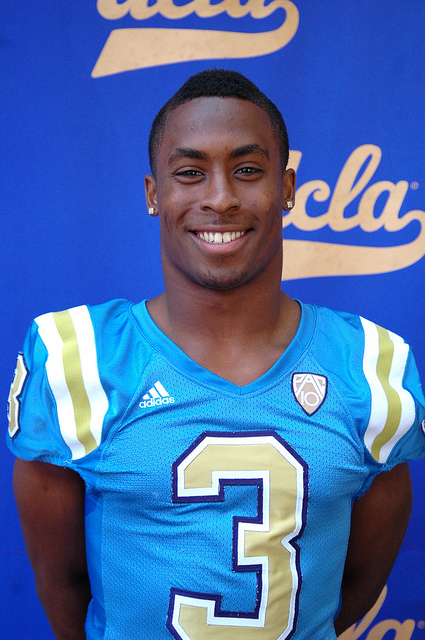
Moore at UCLA

As a freshman at the University of California, Los Angeles, in 2008, Moore started all 12 games for the Bruins at free safety. He finished the season with 60 tackles and three interceptions and was on Rivals.com All-Pac-10 Freshman team.

As a sophomore in 2009, Moore led the nation in interceptions with 10, with the last one at the EagleBank Bowl game. His interception helped the Bruins to a 30–21 victory over the Temple Owls on December 29, 2009. Moore was named to the 2009 All Pac-10 first team along with four other UCLA teammates on December 7. Moore was also named to several All-American teams following the 2009 season.

As a junior, Moore recorded his first interception of the 2010 season against then-No. 23 Houston and helped his team to a 31–13 victory. A week later, Moore's 8 tackles (7 solos) contributed to UCLA's upset of then-No. 7 Texas Longhorns in Austin, Texas; there was a stadium-record crowd.

== Professional career ==
Pre-draft measurables
| Height | Weight | Arm length | Hand span | Wingspan | 40-yard dash | 10-yard split | 20-yard split | 20-yard shuttle | Three-cone drill | Vertical jump | Broad jump | Bench press |
|---|---|---|---|---|---|---|---|---|---|---|---|---|
| 5 ft 11 3/4 in (1.82 m) | 202 lb (92 kg) | 30 1/4 in (0.77 m) | 9 5/8 in (0.24 m) | 6 ft 2 1/2 in (1.89 m) | 4.62 s | 1.65 s | 2.73 s | 3.96 s | 6.98 s | 35 in (0.89 m) | 9 ft 7 in (2.92 m) | 15 reps |
All values from 2011 NFL Scouting Combine/Pro Day

=== Denver Broncos ===
The Denver Broncos selected Moore in the second round (45th overall) of the 2011 NFL draft. Moore made his regular season debut on September 12, 2011 and recorded four solo tackles in the Broncos season-opening 23–20 loss to the Oakland Raiders. Moore recorded his first career interception in Denver's week 4 49–23 loss to the Green Bay Packers as he picked off a deflected pass from Matt Flynn.

During the 2012–13 NFL Playoffs, Moore lost favor with Broncos management and fans due to a key gaffe during the Broncos' game against the Baltimore Ravens in the Divisional Round. Denver was leading Baltimore 35–28 with less than a minute left in the game. Baltimore lined up for what was essentially a Hail Mary towards the end zone. Joe Flacco unloaded a deep pass to Jacoby Jones up on the right sideline. Moore, whose responsibility was to not let the receiver on his side of the field get behind him, was poorly positioned and was caught back-pedaling as Jones went by him. He mistimed his jump as the ball went over his head, and then fell over as the pass was easily cradled by Jones, who then walked into the end zone for the game-tying touchdown. Baltimore would go on to win the game 38–35 in double overtime and eventually win Super Bowl XLVII.

=== Houston Texans ===
On March 12, 2015, Moore signed a three-year $12 million contract with the Houston Texans. Moore was released on March 3, 2016.

=== Cleveland Browns ===
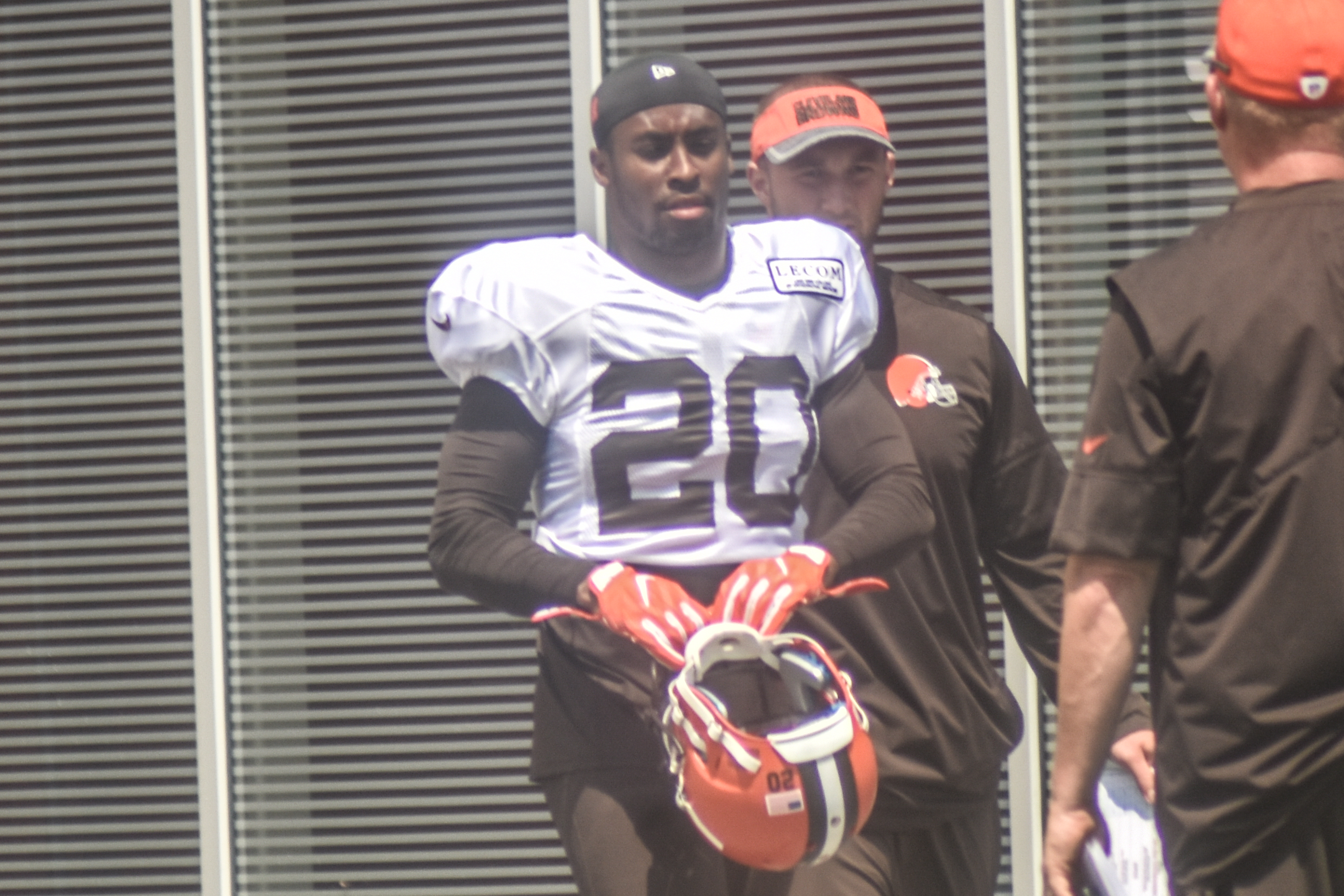
Moore with the Browns in 2016

On March 17, 2016, Moore signed a one-year contract with the Cleveland Browns. After making the Browns' initial 53-man roster, he was released the following day on September 4, 2016.

=== New York Giants ===
On January 12, 2017, Moore signed a reserve/future contract with the Giants. He was released by the Giants on May 25, 2017.

=== Arizona Hotshots ===
On November 9, 2018, Moore signed with the Arizona Hotshots of the Alliance of American Football (AAF) for the 2019 season. By the time the league ceased operations in April 2019, only 8 games had been played but Moore managed 19 tackles and 3 passes defended.

=== DC Defenders ===
Moore was drafted in the 7th round during phase four in the 2020 XFL draft by the DC Defenders. He was waived during final roster cuts on January 22, 2020. He was re-signed on February 1, 2020. Moore recorded an interception in his first XFL game against the Seattle Dragons, on February 8, 2020. It was the first interception in the league's history. In the COVID-19 pandemic shorted season, Moore played in all 5 possible games, and was credited with 15 tackles, two interceptions, and a forced fumble. Pro Football Focus named Moore as one of the highest graded defensive backs. He had his contract terminated when the league suspended operations on April 10, 2020.

=== Arlington Renegades ===
Moore was selected by the Arlington Renegades in the 2023 XFL draft.

== NFL career statistics ==
Legend
| **Bold** | Career high |

=== Regular season ===
| Year | Team | Games | | Tackles | | | | | Interceptions | | | | | Fumbles | | | |
| Year | Team | GP | GS | Cmb | Solo | Ast | Sck | TFL | Int | Yds | TD | Lng | PD | FF | FR | Yds | TD |
|---|---|---|---|---|---|---|---|---|---|---|---|---|---|---|---|---|---|
| 2011 | DEN | 15 | 7 | 31 | 28 | 3 | 0.0 | 1 | 1 | 18 | 0 | 18 | 2 | 0 | **1** | 0 | 0 |
| 2012 | DEN | **16** | 15 | **72** | **60** | **12** | **1.0** | **4** | 1 | 23 | 0 | **23** | **6** | 0 | **1** | 0 | 0 |
| 2013 | DEN | 10 | 10 | 44 | 38 | 6 | 0.0 | 0 | 2 | 18 | 0 | 18 | **6** | 0 | 0 | 0 | 0 |
| 2014 | DEN | **16** | **16** | 50 | 44 | 6 | 0.0 | 0 | **4** | **36** | 0 | 19 | 5 | **1** | **1** | 0 | 0 |
| 2015 | HOU | 7 | 6 | 16 | 10 | 6 | 0.0 | 0 | 1 | 17 | 0 | 17 | 2 | 0 | 0 | 0 | 0 |
| | | 64 | 54 | 213 | 180 | 33 | 1.0 | 5 | 9 | 112 | 0 | 23 | 21 | 1 | 3 | 0 | 0 |

=== Playoffs ===
| Year | Team | Games | | Tackles | | | | | Interceptions | | | | | Fumbles | | | |
| Year | Team | GP | GS | Cmb | Solo | Ast | Sck | TFL | Int | Yds | TD | Lng | PD | FF | FR | Yds | TD |
|---|---|---|---|---|---|---|---|---|---|---|---|---|---|---|---|---|---|
| 2011 | DEN | **1** | 0 | 3 | 1 | **2** | 0.0 | 0 | 0 | 0 | 0 | 0 | 0 | 0 | 0 | 0 | 0 |
| 2012 | DEN | **1** | **1** | **7** | **6** | 1 | 0.0 | 0 | 0 | 0 | 0 | 0 | 0 | 0 | 0 | 0 | 0 |
| 2014 | DEN | **1** | **1** | 2 | 2 | 0 | 0.0 | 0 | **1** | 0 | 0 | 0 | **1** | 0 | 0 | 0 | 0 |
| | | 3 | 2 | 12 | 9 | 3 | 0.0 | 0 | 1 | 0 | 0 | 0 | 1 | 0 | 0 | 0 | 0 |
