= Tyson Alualu =

American football player (born 1987)

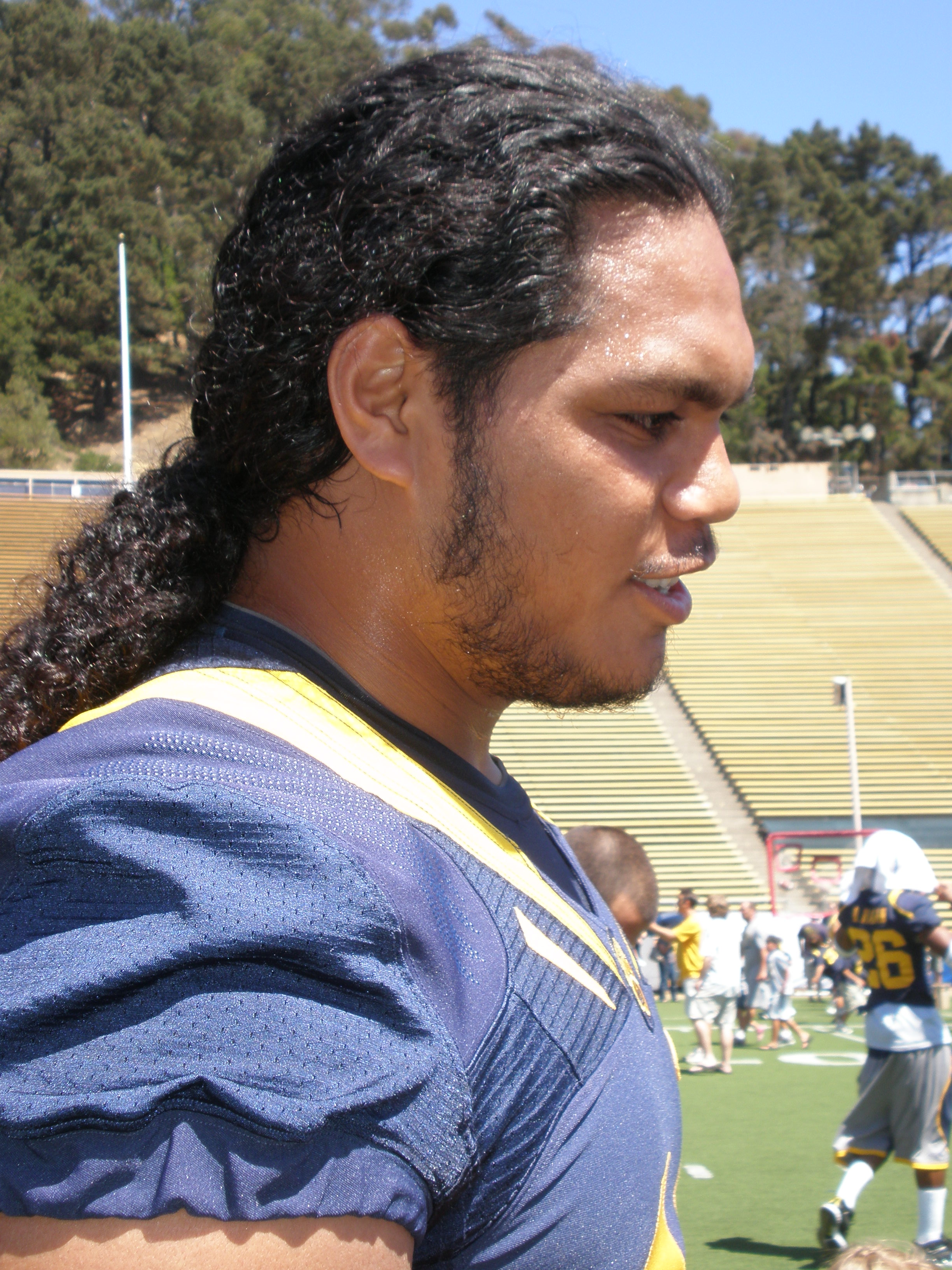
- Alualu during his tenure at Cal in 2009

No. 92, 93, 94
- Position: Nose tackle

Personal information
- Born: May 12, 1987 (age 39); Honolulu, Hawaii, U.S.
- Listed height: 6 ft 3 in (1.91 m)
- Listed weight: 304 lb (138 kg)

Career information
- High school: Saint Louis School (Honolulu, Hawaii)
- College: California (2006–2009)
- NFL draft: 2010: 1st round, 10th overall pick

Career history
- Jacksonville Jaguars (2010–2016); Pittsburgh Steelers (2017–2022); Detroit Lions (2023)

Awards and highlights
- PFWA All-Rookie Team (2010); First-team All-Pac-10 (2009); Second-team All-Pac-10 (2008)

Career NFL statistics
- Total tackles: 420
- Sacks: 25.0
- Forced fumbles: 4
- Fumble recoveries: 3
- Pass deflections: 15
- Stats at Pro Football Reference

Tyson Asi Alualu (/ˌɑːluˈɑːluː/ AH-loo-AH-loo; born May 12, 1987) is an American former professional football player who was a nose tackle in the National Football League (NFL). He was selected by the Jacksonville Jaguars in the first round of the 2010 NFL draft. He played college football for the California Golden Bears.

== Early life ==
A native of Honolulu, Hawaii, Alualu attended and graduated from Saint Louis School in Hawaii in 2005. He was selected to the all-state team twice by the Honolulu Star Bulletin. He was ranked as the No. 2 player in Hawaii and the No. 24 defensive tackle in America by Rivals.com for 2005. He recorded 7 sacks and 59 tackles in high school. During his senior year, he was named the ILH Player of the Year by the Honolulu Advertiser.

== College career ==
Alualu played in all 13 games of his first season at the University of California, Berkeley, then started all thirteen games of his next three consecutive seasons. He earned second-team All-Pac-10 Conference honors in as a junior 2008 and first-team All-Pac-10 honors as a senior in 2009. Following his senior season, Alualu represented Cal at the 2010 Senior Bowl, where he finished the game with a sack, a fumble forced, and a fumble recovered.

== Professional career ==
=== Pre-draft ===
After the 2009 season, Alualu was ranked at the 12th best defensive line prospect (42nd overall) in the 2010 NFL draft by Sports Illustrated. Coming out of California in 2010, Alualu was projected to be a first or second round pick. He received an invitation to the NFL Combine and completed all of the required combine and positional drills. On March 10, 2010, he participated at California's pro day and opted to attempt the bench press (24) and short shuttle (4.28), achieving better numbers in both. Alualu was ranked the fourth best defensive end by NFLDraftScout.com.

Pre-draft measurables
Height	Weight	Arm length	Hand span	40-yard dash	10-yard split	20-yard split	20-yard shuttle	Three-cone drill	Vertical jump	Broad jump	Bench press
6 ft 2 3/8 in (1.89 m)	295 lb (134 kg)	33 in (0.84 m)	10 in (0.25 m)	5.02 s	1.73 s	2.82 s	4.28 s	7.15 s	35.5 in (0.90 m)	9 ft 8 in (2.95 m)	24 reps
All values from NFL Combine/Pro Day

=== Jacksonville Jaguars ===
==== 2010 ====
The Jacksonville Jaguars selected Alualu in the first round (10th overall) of the 2010 NFL draft. The move was widely regarded as the biggest surprise of the draft by analysts and, according to Mel Kiper Jr., was "a risky move for taking him this high". On August 2, 2010, Alualu signed a five-year deal with the Jaguars. The contract includes $17.5 million guaranteed and a total value of roughly $28 million.

Alualu started his rookie season as the starting defensive tackle, alongside Terrance Knighton. He started the Jaguars' season-opening 24–17 victory over the Denver Broncos and finished with three solo tackles and sacked Kyle Orton for the first of his career. In Week 6, he made a season-high five combined tackles in a 30–3 loss to the Tennessee Titans. Over the course of the season Alualu started all 16 games, recording a total of 38 combined tackles (29 solo) and 3.5 sacks. Following his rookie year, he was named to All-Rookie teams by National Football Post, Pro Football Weekly, and The Sporting News.

==== 2011 ====
Alualu returned as the starting defensive tackle with Knighton in 2011. On September 18, 2011, he recorded a season-high four solo tackles during a 32–3 loss to the New York Jets. On October 16, 2011, Alualu made three solo tackles and made his first sack of the season on Ben Roethlisberger, as the Jaguars were defeated 17–13 by the Pittsburgh Steelers. He started all 16 games with 40 combined tackles (21 solo), 2.5 sacks, a pass defended, and a fumble recovery returned for seven yards.

==== 2012 ====
Alualu was named the starting defensive tackle by new head coach Mike Mularkey. In the season-opener against the Minnesota Vikings, he collected four combined tackles and sacked Christian Ponder in a 26–23 overtime loss. During a Week 10 loss to the Indianapolis Colts, Alualu recorded five solo tackles and sacked Andrew Luck.

He started all 16 games in 2012 and finished with a career-high 45 combined tackles (34 solo), 3.5 sacks, 1 pass defended, and 1 fumble recovery. The Jaguars finished 2–14 in his only season under Mike Mularkey.

==== 2013 ====
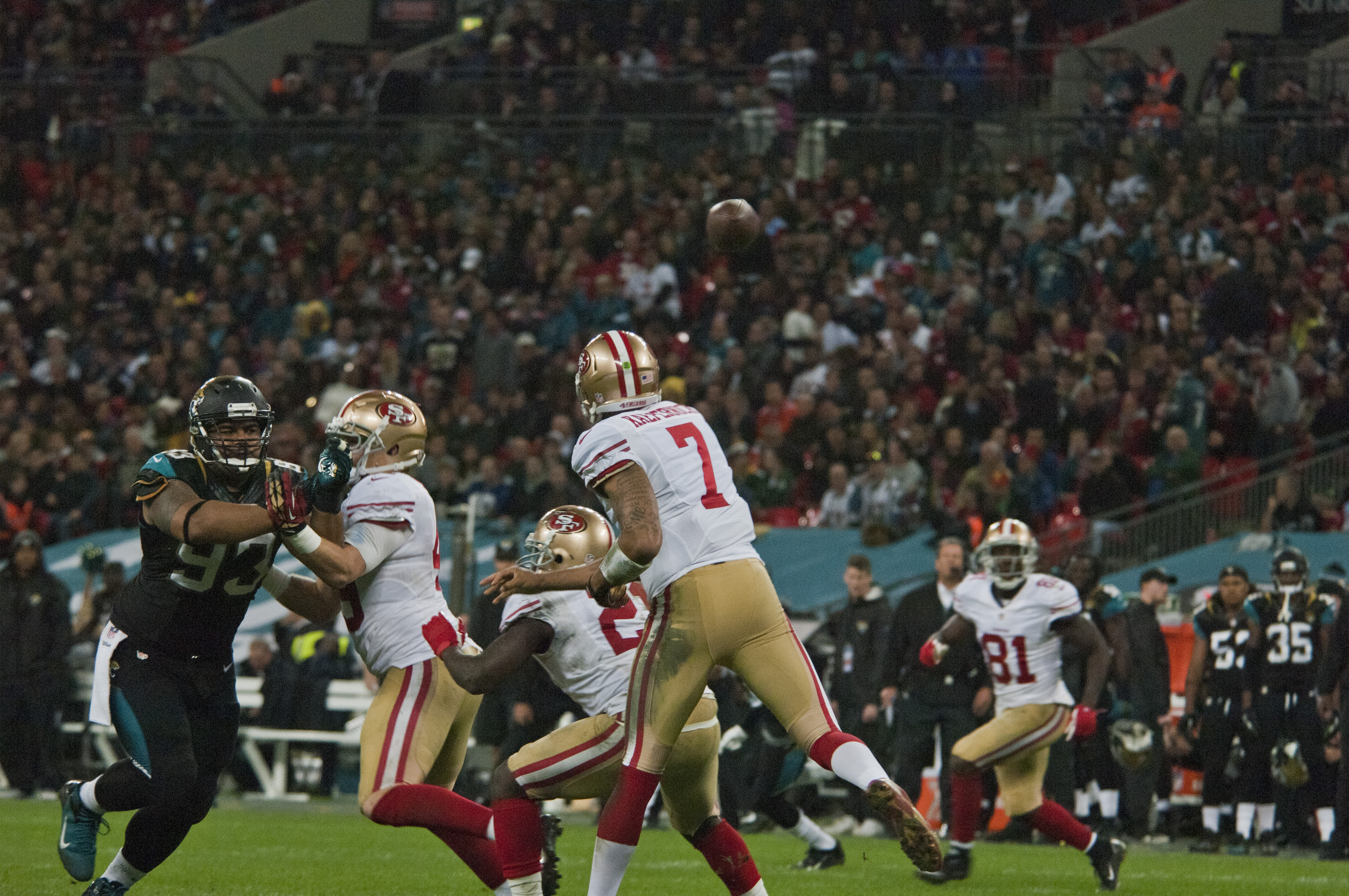
Alualu (left) playing against the San Francisco 49ers in 2013.

On January 17, 2013, the Jaguars hired Gus Bradley as their head coach, marking Alualu's third head coach entering his fourth season. During organized team activities in May, Bradley announced that Alualu would move to defensive end. He competed with Jason Babin, Andre Branch, and Jeremy Mincey for the starting defensive end job. Gus Bradley named him the starting defensive end, along with Jason Babin, to begin the 2013 season.

On September 29, 2013, Alualu made a tackle and earned his first full sack of the season on Colts quarterback Andrew Luck during a 37–3 loss. In Week 7, he collected a season-high six solo tackles in a 24–6 loss to the San Diego Chargers. He finished the season with 42 combined tackles (33 solo tackles) and 1.5 sacks. In head coach Gus Bradley's first season the Jaguars finished 4–12.

==== 2014 ====
He competed with Red Bryant, Chris Clemons, and Andre Branch for a starting defensive end spot. He was named the backup defensive end to Chris Clemons and Red Bryant to begin the regular season.

In a Week 2 loss to the Washington Redskins, Alualu recorded a season-high seven combined tackles. On November 30, 2014, he made one tackle and sacked New York Giants quarterback Eli Manning for the first of the season. He finished the season with 30 combined tackles (13 solo) and two sacks in 16 games and zero starts.

==== 2015 ====
On March 7, 2015, the Jaguars re-signed Alualu to a two-year, $6 million contract. He participated in training camp and competed for the starting defensive end job with Chris Clemons, Jared Odrick, Ryan Davis, Andre Branch, and Chris Smith. He was named the starting defensive end with Chris Clemons to begin 2015.

In a Week 5 loss to the Tampa Bay Buccaneers, Alualu collected a season-high four combined tackles. On October 12, 2015, he recorded a tackle and sacked Titans quarterback Charlie Whitehurst during a 16–14 loss. During the 2015 season, he played all 16 games starting 14 of them, making 26 tackles (18 solo), two sacks, two passes defended, and a fumble recovery.

==== 2016 ====
Alualu competed with Jared Odrick, Yannick Ngakoue, Chris Smith, and Sen'Derrick Marks for the starting defensive end job. He was named the backup to Jared Odrick and rookie Dante Fowler for the start of the season.

He was a healthy scratch for the first two games of the season. On September 25, 2016, he earned his first start of the season, playing in place of Jared Odrick who suffered a triceps injury the week prior. He made three combined tackles during the 19–17 loss to the Baltimore Ravens. The next week, Alualu earned two combined tackles and sacked Andrew Luck, for his first of the season, as the Jaguars defeated the Colts 30–27. He finished with a total of 37 combined tackles (29 solo) and 2.5 sacks in 14 games and ten starts.

Alualu was not resigned and became an unrestricted free agent at the completion of the 2016 season.

=== Pittsburgh Steelers ===
==== 2017 ====
On March 21, 2017, the Pittsburgh Steelers signed Alualu to a two-year, $6 million contract that includes $1.75 million guaranteed and a signing bonus of $1.25 million.

He competed with Leterrius Walton, Lavon Hooks, and Roy Philon for a backup defensive end position. Alualu was named the backup right defensive end to Cameron Heyward to start the regular season.

Alualu made his Pittsburgh Steelers debut in their season-opening 21–18 victory over the Cleveland Browns and recorded five combined tackles. On September 17, 2017, he earned his first start of the season in place of Stephon Tuitt, who suffered a biceps injury the week prior. He collected three combined tackles during the Steelers' 26–9 victory over the Vikings. In Week 7, he recorded four solo tackles and made his first sack as a Steeler, taking down Cincinnati Bengals quarterback Andy Dalton in a 29–14 victory.

==== 2018 ====
In 2018, Alualu played in 15 games with two starts, recording a career-low 22 combined tackles and no sacks.

==== 2019 ====
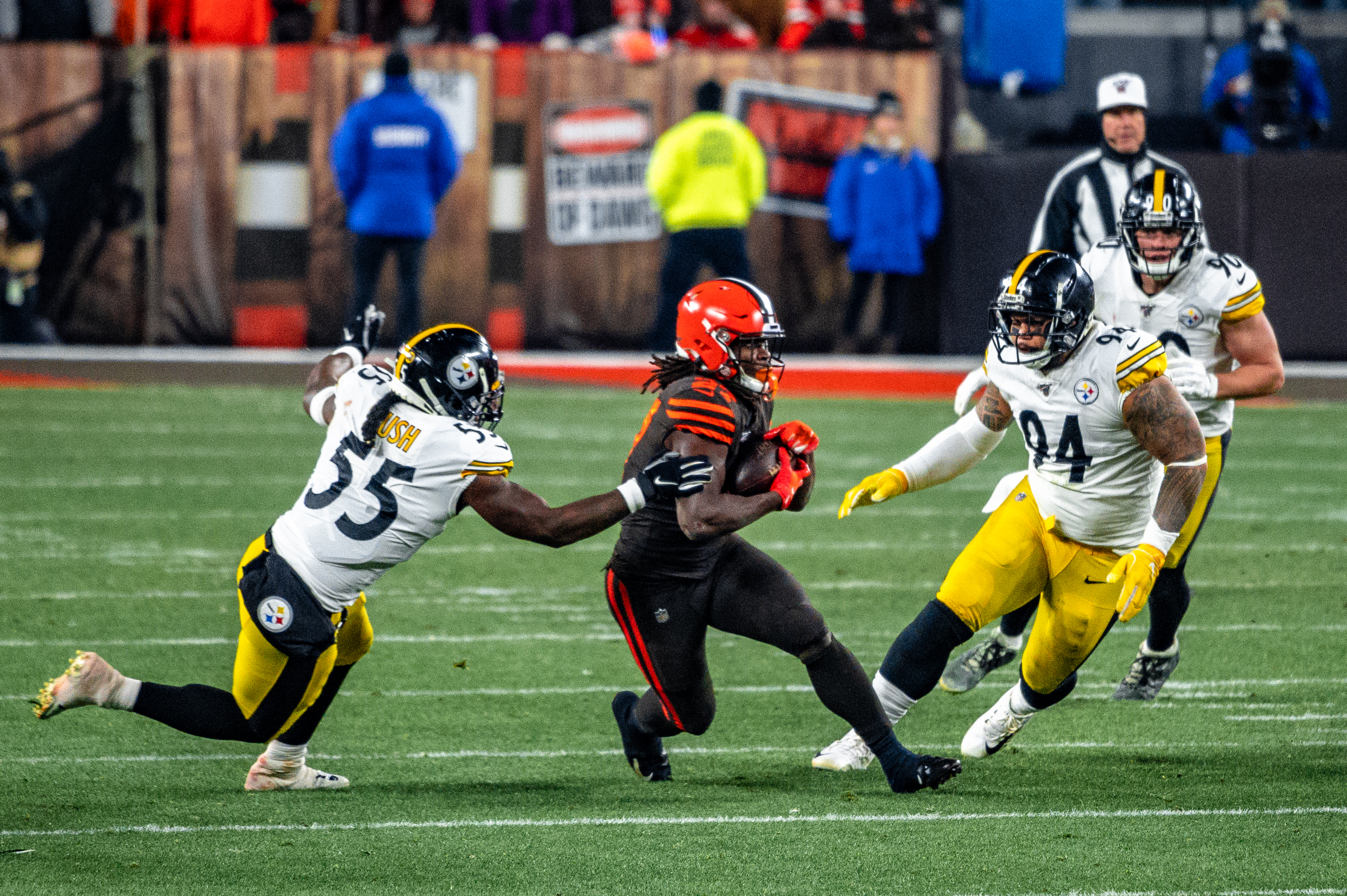
Alualu in a game against the Cleveland Browns

On February 22, 2019, Alualu signed a two-year contract extension with the Steelers. In week 4 against the Cincinnati Bengals, Alualu sacked Andy Dalton on a fourth down late in the fourth quarter, sealing a 27–3 win.

==== 2020 ====
In Week 2 against the Broncos, Alualu recorded his first sack of the season on Jeff Driskel during the 26–21 win.

==== 2021 ====
During free agency, Alualu had initially agreed to terms with the Jacksonville Jaguars; however, his trip to Jacksonville was delayed due to his testing positive for COVID-19. He ultimately changed his mind and decided to instead re-sign with the Steelers on a two-year contract.

In Week 2, Alualu suffered a fractured ankle and was placed on injured reserve on September 20, 2021.

=== Detroit Lions ===
On December 5, 2023, Alualu signed with the Detroit Lions practice squad. He was promoted to the active roster on January 24, 2024.

== NFL career statistics ==
Legend
**Bold**	Career high

Year	Team	GP	COMB	TOTAL	AST	SACK	FF	FR	FR YDS	PD
2010	JAX	16	38	29	9	3.5	0	0	0	1
2011	JAX	16	40	21	19	2.5	**1**	**1**	**7**	1
2012	JAX	16	**45**	**34**	11	3.5	0	**1**	0	1
2013	JAX	16	42	33	9	1.5	0	0	0	1
2014	JAX	16	30	13	17	2.0	0	0	0	0
2015	JAX	16	26	18	8	2.0	0	**1**	0	2
2016	JAX	14	37	29	8	2.5	**1**	0	0	0
2017	PIT	16	39	25	14	**4.0**	0	0	0	1
2018	PIT	15	22	12	10	0.0	0	0	0	0
2019	PIT	16	41	21	20	1.0	**1**	0	0	2
2020	PIT	15	38	17	**21**	2.0	**1**	0	0	**5**
2021	PIT	2	5	2	3	0.0	0	0	0	0
2022	PIT	17	13	5	8	0.5	0	0	0	1
Career		191	416	259	157	25.0	4	3	7	15

== Personal life ==
Alualu was born in Honolulu, Hawaii, and grew up in the Kuhio Park Terrace neighbourhood of Kalihi. He was one of nine children, with seven sisters and a brother. His sister, Trinity Alualu, played college volleyball at Tulsa. His father, Ta'avao Alualu, went in and out of prison in Alualu's youth, having been convicted multiple times on assault and drug charges.

Alualu married Desiré Pomele in 2005. He had started at California in the summer of that year, but returned home before fall semester classes to get married and to see the birth of his first child, Tyreé. He returned to California and enrolled in January 2006. Alualu also has a daughter, Deréon, who was born in 2008. He now has 6 children total with the addition of Tydes in 2011, Tyten in 2015, Tyson-Jaxx in 2017, & Deonne-Skye in 2020. His oldest son, Tyree, plays as a linebacker for the Temple Owls football team.
