= Chris Marinelli =

American football player (born 1987)

No. 63
- Position: Offensive tackle

Personal information
- Born: March 3, 1987 (age 39); Quincy, Massachusetts, U.S.
- Listed height: 6 ft 7 in (2.01 m)
- Listed weight: 298 lb (135 kg)

Career information
- High school: Boston College (Boston, Massachusetts)
- College: Stanford
- NFL draft: 2010: undrafted

Career history
- Denver Broncos (2010)*; Indianapolis Colts (2010)*
- * Offseason or practice squad member only

Awards and highlights
- Second-team All-American (2009); First-team All-Pac-10 (2009); Pac-10 All-Freshman team (2006)

Chris Marinelli (born March 3, 1987) is an American former professional football player who was an offensive tackle in the National Football League (NFL). He played college football for the Stanford Cardinal and was signed as an undrafted free agent by the Denver Broncos in 2010.

== Early life ==
Marinelli was born in Quincy Massachusetts and moved to Braintree Massachusetts while in high school. Marinelli attended Boston College High School in Dorchester, Boston, where he was a three-year starter at defensive tackle and two-year starter on offense, where he played tight end as a junior and offensive tackle as a senior. For his career, he finished with 160 tackles, 17 quarterback sacks, 12 pass breakups, 10 forced fumbles, five fumble recoveries, one interception and a forced safety.

Considered a three-star recruit by Rivals.com, Marinelli was listed as the No. 46 offensive tackle prospect in the nation. He chose Stanford University over Boston College and Duke University.

== College career ==
After redshirting his initial year at Stanford, Marinelli played in 10 games and started five of the last six games at right tackle. He was named to the Pac-10's All-Freshman team. Having established himself as a solid player, Marinelli started all 12 games at right tackle in his sophomore season.

In his junior year, he started 11 of 12 games, missing only the Washington State game with an injury. He earned All-Pacific-10 honorable mention honors for the second consecutive time.

In 2009, Marinelli was moved over to the left side, and helped set a new school-record for rushing with 2,692 yards, breaking the 1949 record of 2,481 yards. The Cardinal offensive line allowed a Pac-10 low six sacks on the year, which was the second lowest total in the nation. Marinelli earned All-Pac-10 First-team honors and was also an All-American selection by Rivals.com

== Professional career ==
=== Denver Broncos ===
Marinelli was signed by the Broncos on April 26, 2010. He was released on July 27, 2010.

=== Indianapolis Colts ===
Marinelli was claimed off waivers on July 28, 2010, by the Indianapolis Colts. He was released by the Colts on September 4, 2010.
