= Daniel Te'o-Nesheim =

Samoan American football player (1987–2017)

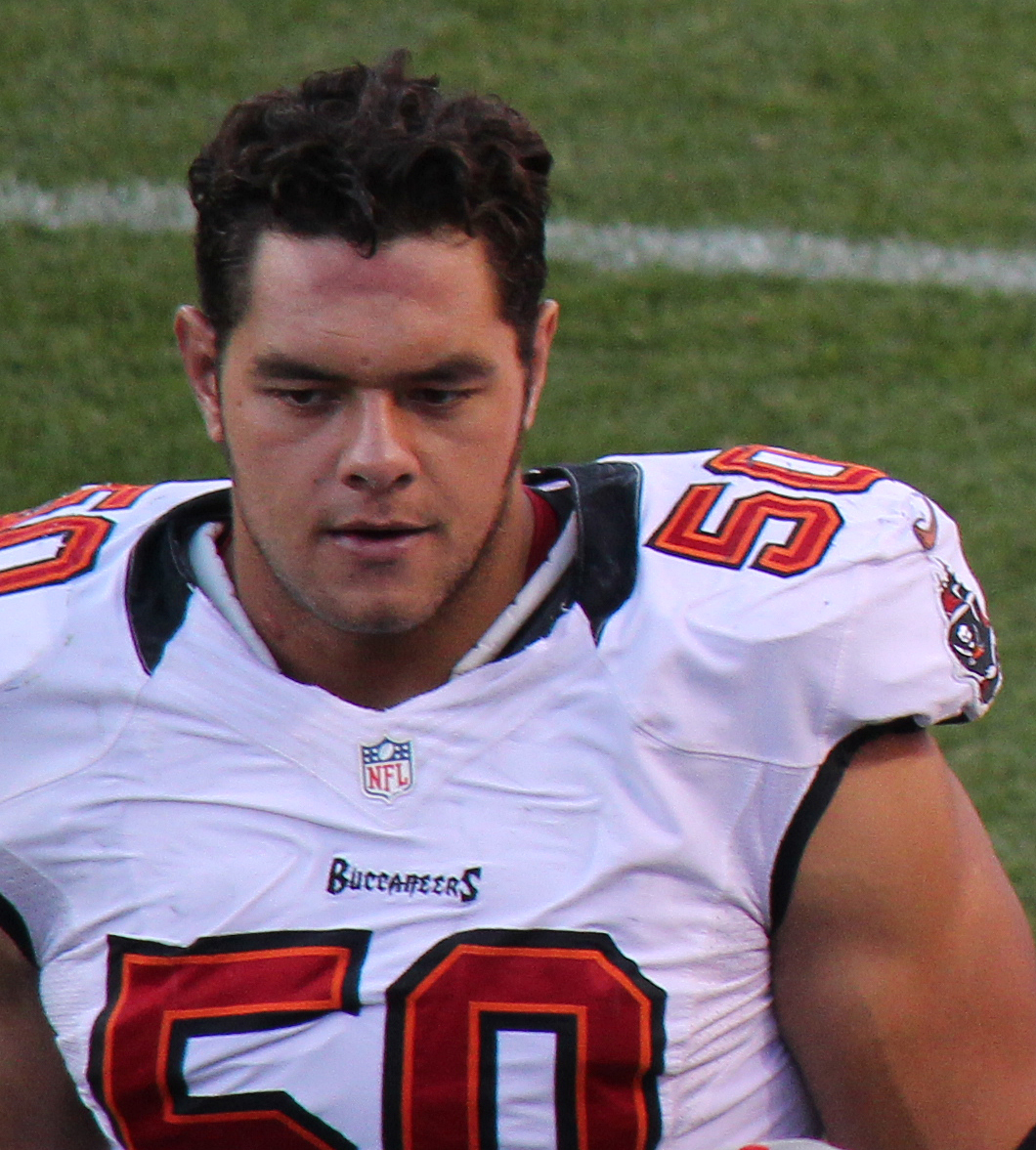
- Te'o-Nesheim with the Tampa Bay Buccaneers in 2012

No. 52, 50
- Positions: Defensive end, linebacker

Personal information
- Born: June 12, 1987; Pago Pago, American Samoa
- Died: October 29, 2017 (aged 30); Hilo, Hawaii, U.S.
- Listed height: 6 ft 3 in (1.91 m)
- Listed weight: 263 lb (119 kg)

Career information
- High school: Hawaii Preparatory Academy (Waimea, Hawaii, U.S.)
- College: Washington
- NFL draft: 2010: 3rd round, 86th overall pick

Career history
- Philadelphia Eagles (2010–2011); Tampa Bay Buccaneers (2011–2013)

Awards and highlights
- First-team All-Pac-10 (2009); Second-team All-Pac-10 (2008); Washington Defensive MVP (2007)

Career NFL statistics
- Total tackles: 56
- Sacks: 5
- Stats at Pro Football Reference

Daniel Te'o-Nesheim (né Nesheim; June 12, 1987 – October 29, 2017) was an American Samoan player of American football who was a defensive end and linebacker in the National Football League (NFL). He was selected by the Philadelphia Eagles in the third round of the 2010 NFL draft. He played college football for the Washington Huskies.

== Early life ==
Te'o-Nesheim was born in Pago Pago, American Samoa on June 12, 1987, to parents David and Ailota Nesheim. He moved to Mill Creek, Washington at the age of 5. His father, David, died of an aneurysm when Te'o-Nesheim was attending Heatherwood Middle School. Te'o-Nesheim relocated back to American Samoa at age 12 before going on to attend boarding school in Hawaii. Although his last name was originally Nesheim his mother suggested adding the Samoan surname Te'o to it while he was in high school as a tribute to the family's Samoan heritage.

Te'o-Nesheim was a three-time first-team all-league selection as two-way lineman during his high school years at Hawaii Preparatory Academy. He helped his team to an 11-1 overall record during his senior year, including a 10-0 league record, before losing in the state semi-finals. Playing on the first-team from the big island to win a state playoff game. He also excelled in track, competing in the shot put and discus. Winning the state championship in shot put and second in discus his senior year. Te'o-Nesheim also lettered in basketball and baseball. He was a high school teammate of center Max Unger. He was coached by Bern Brostek (NFL center).

Te'o-Nesheim was recruited by Oregon, Hawaii and Washington, but committed to Washington a few days prior to signing day in 2005.

== College career ==
Te'o-Nesheim played college football for the Washington Huskies. He redshirted in 2005 and earned the scout team defensive player of the year award. He was named the defensive MVP in 2007. In 2008, he won the Guy Flaherty Most Inspirational Award, the John P. Angel Defensive Lineman of the Year award, and the L. Wait Rising Lineman of the Year award. He was named a team captain in 2008 and 2009. He earned second-team All-Pac-10 honors in 2009.

He started all 49 games of his career recording a total of 194 tackles, 30 sacks, 50.5 tackles for loss, eight forced fumbles, and two fumble recoveries. His 30 sacks set a school record for career sacks, breaking the record set by Ron Holmes, who played from 1981 to 1984, with 28.

== Professional career ==
=== Philadelphia Eagles ===
Te'o-Nesheim was selected by the Philadelphia Eagles in the third round (86th overall) of the 2010 NFL draft. He was signed to a four-year contract on June 16, 2010. Te'o-Nesheim was hindered by a shoulder injury throughout his rookie season, only playing in six games (starting in the season-finale against Dallas after the Eagles clinched a playoff berth) and recording two tackles and one sack. He registered his first career sack in the game against the Cowboys.

Te'o-Nesheim was waived on September 3, 2011, during final roster cuts, but was re-signed to the team's practice squad on September 4.

=== Tampa Bay Buccaneers ===
After spending most of the 2011 season on the Eagles' practice squad, Te'o-Nesheim was signed off it by the Tampa Bay Buccaneers on November 22.

=== NFL statistics ===
Year	Team	GP	COMB	TOTAL	AST	SACK	FF	FR	FR YDS	INT	IR YDS	AVG IR	LNG	TD	PD
2010	PHI	6	2	2	0	1.0	0	0	0	0	0	0	0	0	0
2011	TB	1	1	1	0	0.0	0	0	0	0	0	0	0	0	0
2012	TB	16	40	24	16	4.0	0	0	0	0	0	0	0	0	0
2013	TB	16	14	9	5	0.0	0	0	0	0	0	0	0	0	0
Career		39	57	36	21	5.0	0	0	0	0	0	0	0	0	0

== Later life and death ==
Following his playing days, Te'o-Nesheim became an assistant coach for two years at his high school, Hawaii Preparatory Academy, before becoming the head coach in 2017. Te'o-Nesheim died at the age of 30 on October 29, 2017. He died after a night of drinking at a friend's house, with a mixture of pills and alcohol in his system, the local medical examiner told The Seattle Times. Te'o-Nesheim's family donated his brain to the Boston University School of Medicine, where doctors determined that he had been suffering from chronic traumatic encephalopathy. He is one of at least 345 NFL players to be diagnosed after death with this disease, which is caused by repeated hits to the head.

== See also ==
- Washington Huskies football statistical leaders
