= Chris Owusu =

American football player (born 1990)

No. 14, 17, 80
- Position: Wide receiver

Personal information
- Born: January 6, 1990 (age 36); Oxnard, California, U.S.
- Listed height: 6 ft 0 in (1.83 m)
- Listed weight: 195 lb (88 kg)

Career information
- High school: Oaks Christian School (Westlake Village, California)
- College: Stanford
- NFL draft: 2012: undrafted

Career history
- San Francisco 49ers (2012)*; San Diego Chargers (2012)*; Tampa Bay Buccaneers (2012–2014); New York Jets (2014–2015)
- * Offseason or practice squad member only

Awards and highlights
- Second-team All-American (2009); First-team All-Pac-10 (2009)

Career NFL statistics
- Receptions: 26
- Receiving yards: 296
- Receiving touchdowns: 1
- Stats at Pro Football Reference

Christopher Lloyd Owusu (born January 6, 1990) is an American former professional football player who was a wide receiver in the National Football League (NFL). He played college football for the Stanford Cardinal. He was signed by the San Francisco 49ers after going undrafted in the 2012 NFL draft.

He also played for the San Diego Chargers and Tampa Bay Buccaneers and New York Jets.

== Early life ==
Owusu graduated from Oaks Christian High School in Westlake Village, California, and was ranked as the 36th best wide receiver in the nation. He was named an All-American wide receiver by SuperPrep, as well as an All-Northwest Section choice by the Ventura County Star and a first-team All-Tri-Valley League selection as a senior in 2007. In his senior year, Owusu caught 32 passes for 563 yards and six touchdowns despite playing in only seven games due to an injury. Owusu also contributed on defense, recording 30 tackles and two interceptions on defense. The year before, he had 33 catches for 747 yards and nine TDs, and eventually was named first-team All-Tri-Valley League, while recording 23 tackles and one interception. During his high school career, the team posted a 46-3 overall record and won four consecutive CIF Southern Section titles. Owusu also played basketball, and added two All-Tri-Valley League honors in his sophomore and junior seasons. He majored in human biology.

=== Track and field ===
Other than football, Owusu was also an all-state sprinter as a junior in 2007, breaking the Ventura County meet record in the 100 meter in 2007 with a time of 10.65 seconds. He also recorded a personal best of 21.71 seconds in the 200 meter.

==== Personal bests ====
Event	Time (seconds)	Venue	Date
100 meters	10.42	Moorpark HS, California	March 2008
200 meters	21.30	Moorpark HS, California	April 19, 2007

== College career ==
Much of Owusu's career was riddled with injuries, including 3 concussions in a 13-month span, starting in his freshman year at Stanford University, when he tore his MCL during fall camp, and only started 5 games that year. He recorded 5 receptions for 80 yards, and 0 touchdowns. Owusu also was a kick returner, with 14 kickoff returns for 326 yards and 0 touchdowns. In 2009, he started 9 games and led the team in touchdowns. In his junior year, he missed 4 games with a hand injury he sustained against Washington State, and also suffered a concussion against the Oregon Ducks. In his final season, he recorded 35 receptions for 376 yards, 2 rushes for 78 yards, as well as 8 kickoff returns for 177 yards. For his career, Owusu averaged 26.6 yards on 78 kickoff returns at and tied a Pac-10 record as a sophomore with three returns for touchdowns (94, 91 and 85 yards). However, as a senior he was knocked out of two games, against Washington State with a concussion, and against USC with a shoulder injury. His worst injury in his college career was against the Oregon State Beavers, where he took a helmet-to-helmet hit with Jordan Poyer with 4:26 remaining in the first half. Owusu remained conscious after the injury, and was pulled off the field via ambulance. He eventually returned to Reser Stadium, but did not play.

== Professional career ==
Pre-draft measurables
Height	Weight	40-yard dash	10-yard split	20-yard split	20-yard shuttle	Three-cone drill	Vertical jump	Broad jump	Bench press
6 ft 0 in (1.83 m)	196 lb (89 kg)	4.36 s	1.45 s	2.50 s	4.27 s	6.85 s	40.5 in (1.03 m)	10 ft 9 in (3.28 m)	19 reps
All values from the NFL Combine

At the NFL Scouting Combine, Owusu ran a 4.36 time at the 40-yard dash, which tied for the second fastest overall. He wasn't selected in the 2012 NFL draft, with his concussion against Oregon State and past injury history being a factor. He was eventually signed by the San Francisco 49ers, reuniting him with Jim Harbaugh. He was later waived as part of the 49ers final roster cuts.

Owusu later was placed on the San Diego Chargers practice squad.

On September 20, 2012 Owusu signed with the Tampa Bay Buccaneers.

=== New York Jets ===
Owusu was signed by the New York Jets on September 29, 2014. Owusu was released on November 1, 2014. He was re-signed to the practice squad two days later. Owusu was promoted to the Jets' active roster on December 4, 2014 after Greg Salas was placed on injured reserve.

== Personal life ==
Owusu is a mixture of Ghanaian and Samoan descent. He has a brother, Brian, who played defensive back at Harvard. His sister, Crystal, was a guard on the Columbia basketball team. His brother Francis also played wide receiver for the Stanford Cardinal football team and is currently a free agent. He also has a third brother named Michael.
