= Dexter Davis (defensive end) =

American gridiron football player (born 1986)

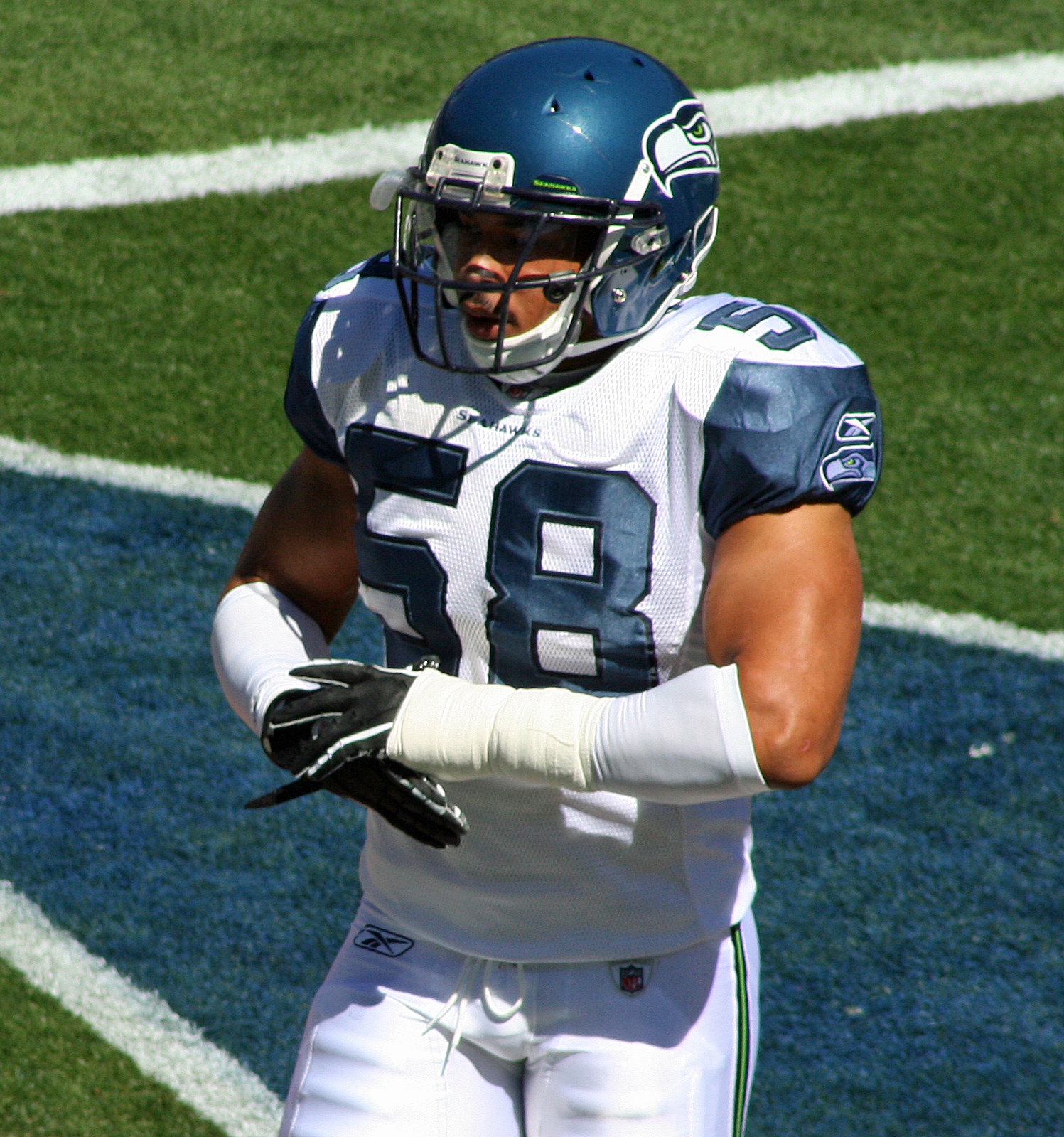
- Davis with the Seattle Seahawks in 2010

No. 58
- Position: Defensive end

Personal information
- Born: November 10, 1986 (age 39); Greensboro, North Carolina, U.S.
- Listed height: 6 ft 1 in (1.85 m)
- Listed weight: 244 lb (111 kg)

Career information
- High school: Thunderbird (Phoenix, Arizona)
- College: Arizona State
- NFL draft: 2010: 7th round, 236th overall pick

Career history
- Seattle Seahawks (2010−2012); Toronto Argonauts (2014)

Awards and highlights
- First-team All-Pac-10 (2009); Second-team All-Pac-10 (2007)

Career NFL statistics
- Total tackles: 13
- Sacks: 1
- Fumble recoveries: 1
- Stats at Pro Football Reference
- Stats at CFL.ca (archive)

Dexter Alexander Davis (born November 10, 1986) is an American former professional football player who was a defensive end in the National Football League (NFL) and Canadian Football League (CFL). He was selected by the Seattle Seahawks in the seventh round of the 2010 NFL draft. He played college football for the Arizona State Sun Devils.

== College career ==
Davis attended Arizona State University. Throughout his career, he started a school record 50 games and finished third on the schools all-time career sack list with 31, behind only Terrell Suggs's 44 and Shante Carver's 41. Along with the 31 sacks he had 136 tackles and 10 forced fumbles.

== Professional career ==
Pre-draft measurables
Height	Weight	Arm length	Hand span	40-yard dash	10-yard split	20-yard split	20-yard shuttle	Three-cone drill	Vertical jump	Broad jump	Bench press
6 ft 1 1/2 in (1.87 m)	244 lb (111 kg)	33 in (0.84 m)	9 1/2 in (0.24 m)	4.64 s	1.60 s	2.70 s	4.30 s	7.08 s	35.5 in (0.90 m)	9 ft 1 in (2.77 m)	25 reps
All values from NFL Combine/Pro Day

=== Seattle Seahawks ===
Davis was selected by the Seattle Seahawks in the seventh round of the 2010 NFL draft (236th overall). The Seahawks announced on June 19, 2010, he had been signed. He recorded a sack in the Seahawks' first pre-season game of the 2010 season against the Tennessee Titans on August 14, 2010, along with another sack that forced a fumble, which Davis also recovered, the following week against Green Bay.

Davis was waived/injured on August 20, 2012, and subsequently reverted to injured reserve on August 22. On April 17, 2013 Davis was waived by the Seahawks making him a free agent.

=== Toronto Argonauts ===
On June 6, 2014, Davis signed with the Toronto Argonauts of the Canadian Football League.

On June 11, 2015, the Argonauts announced the retirement of Davis.
