= Kyle Williams (wide receiver, born 1988) =

American football player (born 1988)

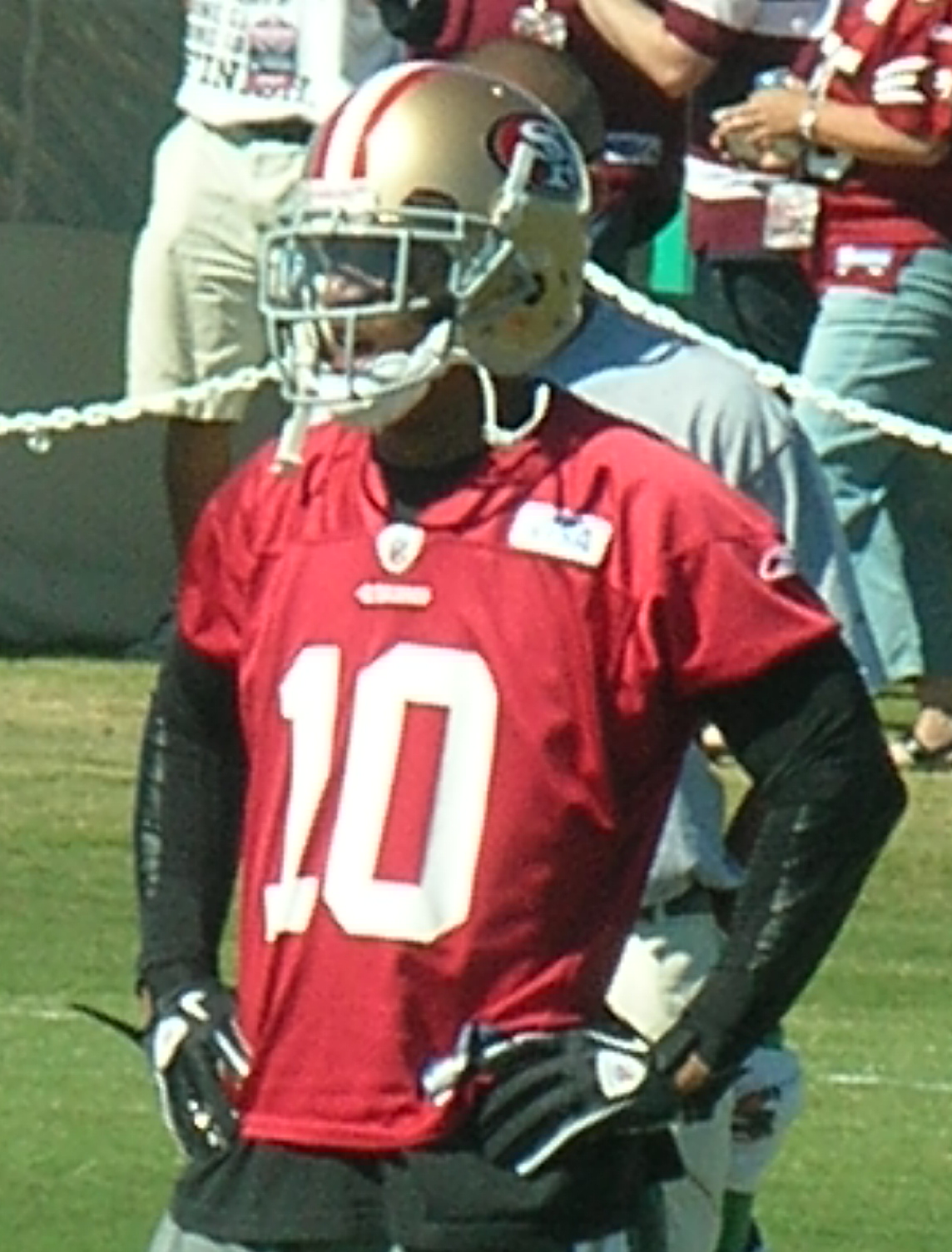
- Williams with the San Francisco 49ers in 2010

No. 10, 19
- Position: Wide receiver

Personal information
- Born: July 19, 1988 (age 38); San Jose, California, U.S.
- Listed height: 5 ft 10 in (1.78 m)
- Listed weight: 186 lb (84 kg)

Career information
- High school: Chaparral (Scottsdale, Arizona)
- College: Arizona State (2006–2009)
- NFL draft: 2010: 6th round, 206th overall pick

Career history
- San Francisco 49ers (2010–2013); Kansas City Chiefs (2013); Denver Broncos (2015); New York Jets (2016)*
- * Offseason or practice squad member only

Awards and highlights
- Super Bowl champion (50); First-team All-Pac-10 (2007); Second-team All-Pac-10 (2009)

Career NFL statistics
- Receptions: 47
- Receiving yards: 574
- Receiving touchdowns: 4
- Return yards: 843
- Stats at Pro Football Reference

Kyle Steven Williams (born July 19, 1988) is an American former professional football player who was a wide receiver in the National Football League (NFL). He played college football for the Arizona State Sun Devils and was selected by the San Francisco 49ers in the sixth round of the 2010 NFL draft. Williams was also a member of the Kansas City Chiefs, Denver Broncos, and New York Jets.

== Early life ==
Born in San Jose, California, to Kenny Williams and Ayiko Broyard, Kyle Williams attended Plainfield Central High School in Plainfield, Illinois before transferring to Chaparral High School in Scottsdale, Arizona in junior year. Williams played baseball and football in high school. As a high school football player, he was named The Arizona Republic Big School State Player of the Year, first-team All-American by EA Sports, all-state first-team by The Arizona Republic, AZFCA first-team 4A all-state, and the Barry Sollenberger High School Player of the Year. He also excelled in baseball and was selected in the 47th round of the 2006 Major League Baseball draft by the Chicago White Sox.

== College career ==
As a sophomore at Arizona State University, he earned first-team All-Pac-10 honors as a punt returner and also had 29 catches for 360 yards and six touchdowns. In 2008, Williams was named honorable mention all-conference as a returner averaging 17.0 yards on punt returns, and also had 19 catches for 364 yards and four touchdowns as a receiver. Williams finally became a regular starter as a senior, leading the Sun Devils with 57 catches for 815 yards and eight touchdowns in 2009, in addition to garnering first-team All-Pac-10 as a wide receiver by PhilSteele.com, and second-team All-Pac-10 as a punt returner.

== Professional career ==
Pre-draft measurables
Height	Weight	Arm length	Hand span	40-yard dash	10-yard split	20-yard split	20-yard shuttle	Three-cone drill	Vertical jump	Broad jump	Bench press
5 ft 10 in (1.78 m)	188 lb (85 kg)	30 in (0.76 m)	9 1/8 in (0.23 m)	4.34 s	1.56 s	2.59 s	4.19 s	7.00 s	37.0 in (0.94 m)	10 ft 0 in (3.05 m)	11 reps
All values from NFL Combine/Pro Day

=== San Francisco 49ers ===
Williams was selected in the sixth round with the 206th pick of the 2010 NFL draft by the San Francisco 49ers. He was injured most of the 2010 season. Williams played in five games and made one reception for 8 yards in the November 21, 2010, loss to the Tampa Bay Buccaneers.

On September 18, 2011, he caught his first touchdown pass in a game against the Dallas Cowboys. On November 20, he caught his second touchdown pass against the Arizona Cardinals. He caught his third in a catch-and-run spanning 56 yards on December 4 against the St. Louis Rams. Williams caught 16 passes in a six-game stretch late in the season after his role increased with injuries to 49ers wide receivers. In the playoffs, Williams caught two passes and made a key block on quarterback Alex Smith's go-ahead 28-yard touchdown run in a 36–32 divisional round win over the New Orleans Saints. With Ted Ginn Jr. injured, Williams started at wide receiver and performed punt returns in the 49ers' 20–17 loss in the NFC Championship game. He lost two fumbles returning punts, including one in overtime that led to the game-winning field goal by the New York Giants. His other fumble in the fourth quarter was followed by a Giants' touchdown to retake the lead, 17–14. Smith defended Williams saying: "Offensively we weren't good enough today. We didn't get it done .... You can't put it on [Williams]".

On November 12, 2013, the 49ers released Williams.

=== Kansas City Chiefs ===
On November 13, 2013, Williams was claimed off waivers by the Kansas City Chiefs. Williams announced on November 22, that he had torn his ACL and would miss the remainder of the season. Re-signing with the Chiefs on April 21, 2014, Williams played all four preseason games in 2014 for Kansas City but injured his shoulder in the final preseason game. On September 1, the Chiefs released Williams.

=== Denver Broncos ===
Williams signed with the Denver Broncos in 2014, however on August 1, 2015, he ruptured his Achilles tendon in his left leg, and announced he would miss the entire 2015 season. On February 7, 2016, Williams was part of the Broncos team that won Super Bowl 50. In the game, the Broncos defeated the Carolina Panthers by a score of 24–10.

=== New York Jets ===
Williams signed with the New York Jets on June 17, 2016. On August 28, Williams was waived by the Jets.

== Personal life ==
Williams's father is the former Chicago White Sox Executive Vice President Kenny Williams. His mother Ayiko Broyard is an executive with Walton Issacson and produces the show Verses & Flow on TV One. His brothers, Kenny and Tyler, both played minor league baseball.
