= 2008 USC Trojans football team =

American college football season

2008 USC Trojans football

Pac-10 champion Rose Bowl champion

Rose Bowl, W 38–24 vs. Penn State
- Conference: Pacific-10 Conference

Ranking
- Coaches: No. 2
- AP: No. 3
- Record: 12–1 (8–1 Pac-10)
- Head coach: Pete Carroll (8th season)
- Offensive coordinator: Steve Sarkisian (2nd season)
- Offensive scheme: Multiple
- Defensive coordinator: Nick Holt (3rd season)
- Base defense: 4–3
- Captains: Jeff Byers; Brian Cushing; Kevin Ellison; Mark Sanchez
- Home stadium: Los Angeles Coliseum

2008 Pacific-10 Conference football standings
	Conf.			Overall
Team	W		L	W		L
No. 3 USC $	8	–	1	12	–	1
No. 10 Oregon	7	–	2	10	–	3
No. 18 Oregon State	7	–	2	9	–	4
California	6	–	3	9	–	4
Arizona	5	–	4	8	–	5
Arizona State	4	–	5	5	–	7
Stanford	4	–	5	5	–	7
UCLA	3	–	6	4	–	8
Washington State	1	–	8	2	–	11
Washington	0	–	9	0	–	12
$ – Conference champion; Rankings from AP Poll

The 2008 USC Trojans football team (variously "Trojans" or "USC") represented the University of Southern California during the 2008 NCAA Division I-A football season. The team was coached by Pete Carroll and played its home games at the Los Angeles Coliseum.

== Before the season ==
=== Pre-season outlook ===
The Trojans finished the 2007 season with a decisive Rose Bowl victory, #2 ranking in the Coaches Poll and #3 ranking (with one first-place vote) in the AP Poll. In January 2008, immediately after the bowl season, USC was ranked at #4 by Sports Illustrated online and #5 by ESPN.com; the general opinion was that while the Trojans were facing key player departures, the losses were mitigated by the overall talent level of the program. Georgia was ranked as the early pre-season #1 team. Sports Illustrated and ESPN.com soon revised their rankings to #3 and #4, respectively, after nearly all draft-eligible juniors decided to remain with the program instead of entering the NFL draft. Going into the spring, USC ranked as the premier team in the Pac-10 Conference, taking advantage of a deep talent pool, including a number of talented running backs holding over from the previous season.

The Trojans' biggest question entering spring practices was who would take over the starting quarterback position from John David Booty. Junior Mark Sanchez entered spring practice as the acknowledged leader, having started three games the previous season due to an injury to Booty, winning two; however, Arkansas-transfer and former Razorback starter Mitch Mustain had the most college game experience, having started and won eight games for the 2006 Razorbacks team his freshman year while putting on an impressive performance on the scout team in the 2007 season during the NCAA-mandated waiting period. Both Sanchez (2005) and Mustain (2006) were considered the top quarterback in the nation coming out of their respective high school classes. The Trojans entered spring with a number of qualified running backs, but not quite as many as in 2007. Battling for the starting position were top returners Junior Stafon Johnson (673 yards) and sophomore Joe McKnight (540 yards); but challenging them would be redshirt sophomore C.J. Gable, who started five games as a freshman in 2006 and the first two of 2007 before a season-ending injury, junior Allen Bradford, as well as previously injured redshirt freshman Broderick Green and Marc Tyler. All six running backs earned Parade or USA Today All-American honors in high school, four earned both. Questions remained around the wide receivers, who had struggled with consistency the previous season; all starters returned, with special attention focused on Arkansas transfer Damian Williams, who caught 19 passes for the Razorbacks in 2006 but sat out 2007 along with fellow Arkansas teammate Mustain. The offensive line was hit hard by graduation, returning only one starter. The defense lost several important players to graduation, but the linebacker corp returned key players such as Brian Cushing Rey Maualuga and Clay Matthews.

By the end of spring practice, the USC coaching staff announced that Sanchez would be the designated starting quarterback going into fall camp. A crowd of 22,000 watched the Trojan Huddle, USC's spring game that ends spring practices, where Sanchez, Mustain and redshirt freshman Aaron Corp all performed well against Trojan defenses; the White team defeated Cardinal, 39–36, in double overtime. With a number of talented linebackers, the Carroll and defensive coordinator Nick Holt began experimenting with using a 3-4 defense variation implementing the "Elephant Position", which features a hybrid end/linebacker position. The Trojans had used Cushing in the Elephant position during the 2006 season before returning to their traditional 4-3 during the 2007 season. In the 2008 variation, the position was filled by senior Clay Matthews, a former walk-on. After spring practices finished across the nation, Sports Illustrated revised its rankings and placed USC as the #3 team, behind Georgia and Ohio State; while ESPN ranked the Trojans #4, behind Ohio State, Georgia and Oklahoma. The running back tandem of Stafon Johnson and Joe McKnight was compared to the "Thunder and Lightning" combination of LenDale White and Reggie Bush, with McKnight mentioned as a top ten Heisman Trophy contender going into the fall.

At the Pacific-10 Conference media day, the Trojans were the near-unanimous pre-season pick to win the conference. USC took 38 of 39 first-place votes; California, which were picked to finish fourth in the overall standings, received the other vote. This was USC's sixth year in a row as the favorite to win the conference title, the longest streak since the Trojans 18-year run from 1965 to 1982.

On the release of the preseason Coaches' Poll, USC was ranked #2 in the nation, behind the 2008 Georgia team: Georgia received 1438 points with 22 first-place votes while USC received 1430 points with 14 first-place votes. Meanwhile, the 2008 Ohio State team was ranked third with 1392 points but an equal number of first-place votes with 14. The preseason Associated Press (AP) Poll ranked USC #3 in the nation, behind Georgia and Ohio State. USC received 12 first-place votes and 1490 points, compared to Georgia's 22 first-place votes and 1528 points and Ohio State's 21 first-place votes and 1506 points. Both polls added to the interest in the OSU-USC game on September 13.

A major concern arose in the first week of fall camp, when Sanchez suffered a dislocated left kneecap while warming up for practice. Trainers were able to immediately put the kneecap back into place, but the injury sidelined Sanchez and threw his availability for the season opener at Virginia (and beyond) into question. As a result, Mustain and redshirt freshman Aaron Corp began alternating repetitions with the first team offense and competing for the possible starting spot. After missing nearly three weeks, Sanchez was cleared to play in the opener on the final day of fall camp; Corp was selected as his back-up.

The biggest issue facing the team entering the season was how the rebuilt offensive line would perform, though it had improved over the course of fall camp. Sanchez, Cushing, offensive lineman Jeff Byers, and senior safety Kevin Ellison were elected team captains by their teammates.

In the week preceding the regular season, all twelve experts polled by ESPN picked USC to win the Pac-10 conference, and three expected them to make it to the BCS National Championship Game with two expecting them to prevail. All seven experts polled by Sports Illustrated picked USC to win their conference, with three forecasting them in the Championship Game with one selecting them to prevail. Rivals.com's panel of four experts unanimously picked USC to play in the title game.

=== Recruiting class ===
USC brought in a top-10 recruiting class in 2008.

==== Transfers ====
Shane Horton, the brother of 2008 recruit Wes Horton, transferred from UNLV and would be required to sit out one season by NCAA rules.

Junior transfer Steve Gatena, former United States Air Force Academy Class of 2008 Cadet, transferred in from UC Davis as an offensive left tackle. Gatena was required to sit out one season by NCAA rules. However, due to his academic standing as a graduate student, Gatena was granted a one time transfer exception for pursuing his academic career and played as the second string left tackle in the season opener against Virginia.

Jordan Cameron, the uncle of Matt Leinart's son with USC basketball player Brynn Cameron, transferred in from Ventura College. A former freshman basketball player from Brigham Young University, Cameron attempted to transfer before the 2007 season to also play football as a wide receiver. However, when some of Cameron's units from Brigham Young did not transfer to USC, he needed to withdraw and attend Ventura College, missing the season but with the option to try to rejoin the team in 2008 (regardless, he would have been ineligible to play in 2007 due to NCAA transfer rules).

==== Departures ====
In addition to graduating starting senior 2007 All-Americans Sam Baker (offensive tackle), John Mackey Award-winner Fred Davis (tight end), Sedrick Ellis (nose tackle), and Keith Rivers (linebacker), as well as first team all-conference defensive end Lawrence Jackson, 2006 first team all-conference quarterback John David Booty and second team all-conference defensive back Terrell Thomas, the Trojans also lost junior All-Conference offensive guard Chilo Rachal to the 2008 NFL draft. Pac-10 conference honorable mention offensive linemen Drew Radovich and Matt Spanos, tailback Chauncey Washington, and linebacker Thomas Williams also departed.

==== Offseason news ====
On the Monday after the 2007 UCLA–USC rivalry game, a 24–7 Trojans victory, embattled Bruins head coach Karl Dorrell was fired. His replacement was former UCLA quarterback Rick Neuheisel, who held previous head coach positions at both Colorado and Washington where he led teams to overall successful records but his departures coincided with NCAA investigations at both universities. Within a month on the job, Neuheisel attracted attention by hiring former USC offensive coordinator Norm Chow as his offensive coordinator. While with Trojans from 2001 to 2004, Chow led the offense to the 2003 and 2004 national championships and saw quarterbacks Carson Palmer and Matt Leinart win the Heisman Trophy. The hire of Chow injected a new level of drama to the rivalry that had somewhat stagnated under Dorrell.

== Schedule ==
The Sporting News ranked the schedule as the toughest in the Pac-10; ESPN.com ranked it as the fourth toughest in the conference. ESPN.com ranked the nonconference schedule as the fifth most difficult in the nation, noting that if Virginia had a good year it would be the toughest.

Date	Time	Opponent	Rank	Site	TV	Result	Attendance
August 30	12:30 p.m.	at Virginia*	No. 3	Scott Stadium; Charlottesville, VA	ABC	W 52–7	64,947
September 13	5:00 p.m.	No. 5 Ohio State*	No. 1	Los Angeles Memorial Coliseum; Los Angeles, CA (College GameDay)	ABC	W 35–3	93,607
September 25	6:00 p.m.	at Oregon State	No. 1	Reser Stadium; Corvallis, OR	ESPN	L 21–27	42,839
October 4	5:00 p.m.	No. 23 Oregon	No. 9	Los Angeles Memorial Coliseum; Los Angeles, CA	ABC	W 44–10	82,765
October 11	12:30 p.m.	Arizona State	No. 8	Los Angeles Memorial Coliseum; Los Angeles, CA	ABC	W 28–0	84,956
October 18	12:30 p.m.	at Washington State	No. 6	Martin Stadium; Pullman, WA	FSN	W 69–0	25,118
October 25	7:15 p.m.	at Arizona	No. 6	Arizona Stadium; Tucson, AZ	FSN	W 17–10	57,427
November 1	3:30 p.m.	Washington^{†}	No. 7	Los Angeles Memorial Coliseum; Los Angeles, CA	FSN	W 56–0	80,216
November 8	5:00 p.m.	No. 21 California	No. 7	Los Angeles Memorial Coliseum; Los Angeles, CA	ABC	W 17–3	88,523
November 15	4:00 p.m.	at Stanford	No. 6	Stanford Stadium; Stanford, CA (rivalry)	Versus	W 45–23	50,425
November 29	5:00 p.m.	Notre Dame*	No. 5	Los Angeles Memorial Coliseum; Los Angeles, CA (Jeweled Shillelagh)	ESPN	W 38–3	90,689
December 6	1:30 p.m.	at UCLA	No. 5	Rose Bowl; Pasadena, CA (Victory Bell)	ABC	W 28–7	87,790
January 1, 2009	2:10 p.m.	No. 6 Penn State*	No. 4-T	Rose Bowl; Pasadena, CA (Rose Bowl) (College GameDay))	ABC	W 38–24	93,293
*Non-conference game; ^{†}Homecoming; Rankings from AP Poll released prior to the game; All times are in Pacific time

== Roster ==
Wide receiver: 1 Patrick Turner – Senior; ~~7 Shane Kovalsky- Junior~~; 8 Ronald Johnson – Sophomore; 9 David Ausberry – (redshirt) Sophomore; 14 Garrett Green – Junior; 17 Travon Patterson – (redshirt) Sophomore; 18 Damian Williams – (redshirt) Sophomore; 23 Jordan Cameron – (redshirt) Sophomore; 28 Drew Ness – (redshirt) Freshman; 46 Sean Calcagnie – (redshirt) Sophomore; 47 Scott Stephens – (redshirt) Sophomore; 49 Robbie Boyer – Freshman; 80 Brandon Carswell – (redshirt) Freshman; 81 Spencer Vigoren – (redshirt) Sophomore; 83 Brice Butler – Freshman; 87 Preston Cavignac – (redshirt) Sophomore; Center: 50 Abe Markowitz – Freshman; 61 Kristofer O'Dowd – Sophomore; 67 Micheal Reardon – (redshirt) Freshman; Offensive guard: 53 Jeff Byers – (redshirt) Senior; 56 Alex Parsons – Junior; 64 Garrett Nolan – (redshirt) Junior; 66 Matt Meyer – Freshman; 74 Zach Heberer – (redshirt) Sophomore; 77 Thomas Herring – (redshirt) Junior; 78 Khaled Holmes – Freshman; Offensive tackle: 68 Butch Lewis – (redshirt) Sophomore; 70 Tyron Smith – Freshman; 71 Charles Brown – (redshirt) Junior; 72 Martin Coleman – (redshirt) Freshman; 73 Steve Gatena – (redshirt) Junior; 75 Matt Kalil – Freshman; 76 Nick Howell – (redshirt) Junior; Tight end: 40 Rhett Ellison – (redshirt) Freshman; 86 Anthony McCoy – Junior; 88 Jimmy Miller – (redshirt) Senior; 89 Blake Ayles – Freshman	Quarterback: 6 Mark Sanchez – (redshirt) Junior; 15 Nick Hyde – (redshirt) Freshman; 16 Mitch Mustain – (redshirt) Sophomore; 19 Chris McCaffery – Freshman; Tailback: 21 Nolan Scelzi – senior; 22 Curtis McNeal – Freshman; 26 Marc Tyler – (redshirt) Freshman; ~~29 Broderick Green – (redshirt) Freshman~~; 39 Chris Fornataro – Freshman; Fullback: 10 D.J. Shoemate – Freshman; 31 Stanley Havili – (redshirt) Sophomore; 39 Alfred Rowe – (redshirt) Sophomore; 41 Matt Hillier – (redshirt) Senior; 45 Adam Goodman – (redshirt) Junior; Defensive tackle: 44 Christian Tupou – Sophomore; 75 Fili Moala – (redshirt) Senior; 90 Derek Simmons – (redshirt) Sophomore; 91 Jurrell Casey – Freshman; 94 Armond Armstead – Freshman; 95 Lawrence Miles – (redshirt) Senior; 98 DaJohn Harris – (redshirt) Freshman; 99 Averell Spicer – (redshirt) Junior; Defensive end: 8 Nick Perry – Freshman; 67 Michael Reardon – (redshirt) Freshman; 79 Andrew Weiss – (redshirt) Senior; 81 Gerald Washington – (redshirt) Senior; 84 Kyle Moore – Senior; 92 Trey Henderson – (redshirt) Freshman; 93 Everson Griffen – Sophomore; 96 Wes Horton – Freshman; 97 Malik Jackson – Freshman; Punter: 25 Billy O'Malley – (redshirt) Sophomore; 44 Greg Woidneck – (redshirt) Senior	Cornerback: 1 T.J. Bryant – Freshman; 7 Cary Harris – Senior; 15 Kevin Thomas – Senior; 22 Jim Abbott – (redshirt) Senior; 24 Shareece Wright – Junior; 25 Daniel Harper – (redshirt) Freshman; 30 Brian Baucham – Freshman; 45 Omari Crittenden – (redshirt) Sophomore; 48 Matthew Jordan – (redshirt) Junior; Linebacker: 24 Jake Beck- senior; 10 Brian Cushing – Senior; 17 Michael Morgan – (redshirt) Sophomore; 6 Malcolm Smith – Sophomore; 35 Uona Kaveinga – Freshman; 37 Jordan Campbell – (redshirt) Freshman; 43 Kaluka Maiava – Senior; 46 Ross Cumming – (redshirt) Sophomore; 47 Clay Matthews III – (redshirt) Senior; 52 Luther Brown – (redshirt) Junior; 54 Chris Galippo – (redshirt) Freshman; 57 Nick Garratt – (redshirt) Junior; 58 Rey Maualuga – Senior; 59 Dan Deckas – (redshirt) Sophomore; Safety: 2 Taylor Mays – Junior; 4 Kevin Ellison – Senior; 19 Drew McAllister – Freshman; 23 Shane Horton – Sophomore‡; 26 Will Harris – (redshirt) Junior; 27 Marshall Jones – Sophomore; 28 Justin Hart – (redshirt) Junior; 34 Spencer Spiegel – (redshirt) Freshman; 36 Josh Pinkard – (redshirt) Senior; 36 Robert Erickson – (redshirt) Sophomore; 49 Ryan McMahon – Freshman; Long snapper: 62 Chris Poussan – Freshman; 63 Christian Putnam – (redshirt) Junior; 85 Cooper Stevenson – (redshirt) Sophomore; Place kicker: 18 David Buehler – Senior; 30 Joe Houston – (redshirt) Sophomore; 38 Jordon Congdon – (redshirt) Junior
Sources: 2007 USC Trojans Football Media Guide, 2008 USC Football Alphabetical Roster ‡ indicates that the player is a transfer who is ineligible to play 2008 season but is allowed to practice with scout team Players who left the team are struck out

== Coaching staff ==
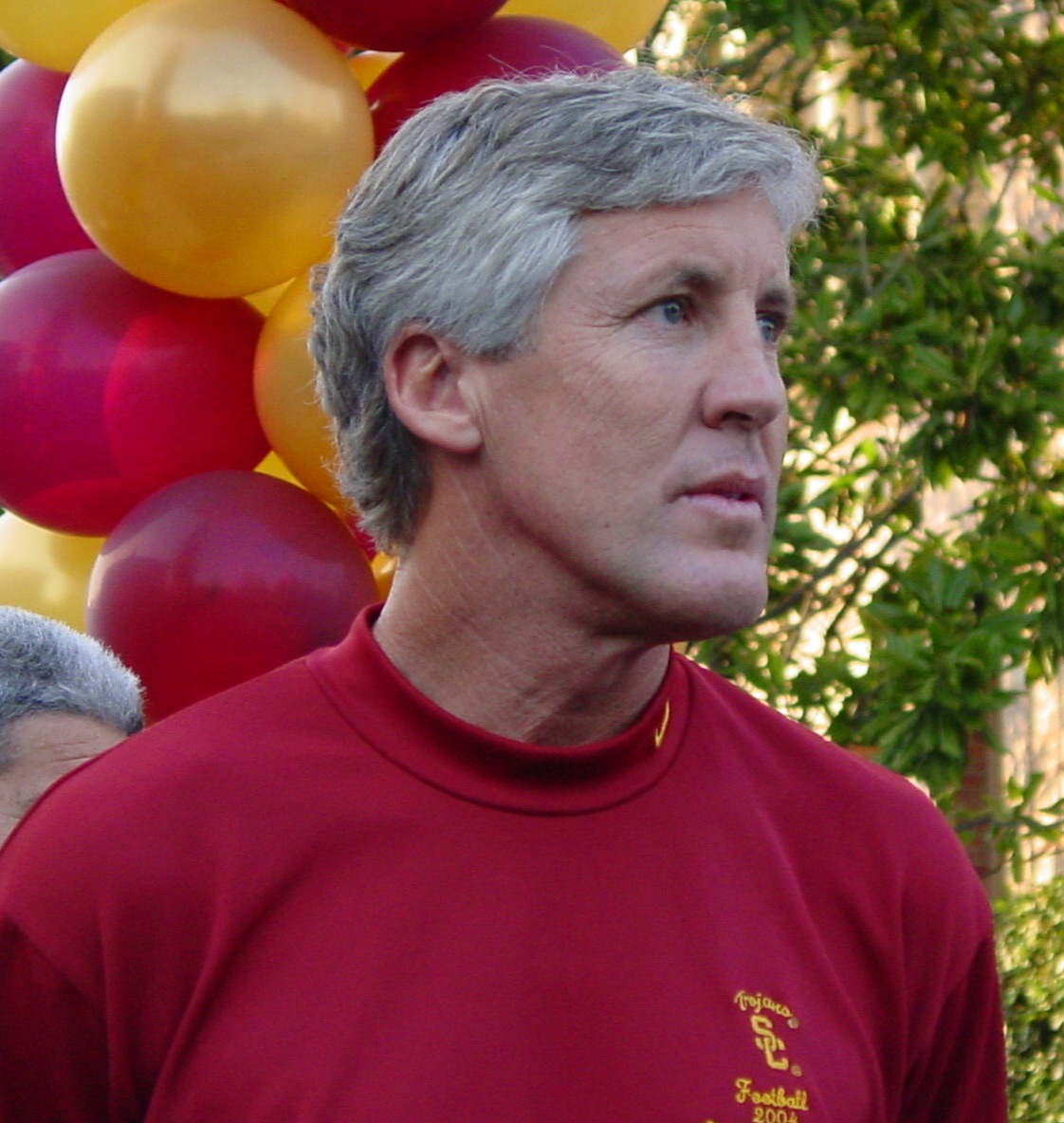
Pete Carroll Head Coach

Nearly the entire USC coaching staff returned from the 2007 season, with the only change being a different Graduate Assistant working with the secondary.

Name	Position	Year at USC	Alma mater (year)
Pete Carroll	Head coach	8th	Pacific (1973)
Steve Sarkisian	Offensive coordinator Quarterbacks	7th 2001–2003, 2005–2008	BYU (1997)
Nick Holt	Defensive coordinator Defensive line	6th 2001–2003, 2006–2008	Pacific (1986)
Todd McNair	Running backs Special teams coordinator	5th	Temple(1988)
Brennan Carroll	Tight ends Recruiting coordinator	7th	Pittsburgh (2001)
John Morton	Wide receivers Passing Game Coordinator	2nd	Western Michigan (1992)
Ken Norton Jr.	Linebackers	5th	UCLA (1988)
Pat Ruel	Offensive line	4th	Miami (1972)
Rocky Seto	Secondary	10th	USC (1999)
David Watson	Defensive line	3rd	Western Illinois (2001)
Chris Carlisle	Strength and conditioning	8th	Chadron State (1985)

== Game summaries ==
=== Virginia ===
	1	2	3	4	Total
Trojans	21	3	14	14	52
Cavaliers	7	0	0	0	7

The Trojans opened their season by visiting the University of Virginia Cavaliers of the Atlantic Coast Conference (ACC) under Al Groh in the first ever game between the two programs and first USC game in Virginia. Virginia went 9–4 in 2007, but off-season losses to both the NFL and unexpected issues left the Cavaliers ranked fifth-out-of-six teams in the ACC's Coastal Division in the preseason. Five UVA players were arrested during the off-season and five other players were dismissed from the team because of academic reasons.

The game was described as possibly the biggest home opener for Virginia at Scott Stadium. Groh noted that he was pleased the game opened his team's schedule due to USC's ability and the general distraction it would otherwise pose to conference play: "It's as good a time as any in that we only wanted to play it in the first game, and they only wanted to play it in the first game." Virginia entered the game having gone 3–4 in opening games under Groh.

Virginia will become the 34th state (plus Japan) where the Trojans have played football. USC entered the game favored by 19.5 points.

Scoring three touchdowns in the first quarter was all USC needed to beat up on the Cavaliers at their home field. Quarterback Mark Sanchez threw for 338 yards, CJ Gable ran for 73 yards, and Ronald Johnson had 78 yards in receiving. The No. 3 Trojans got off to a good start, thanks to the Virginia turnovers.

USC continued their undefeated streak in openers away from home under Carroll.

=== Ohio State ===
Team	1	2	3	4	Total
Ohio State	3	0	0	0	3
• USC	7	14	14	0	35

- Date: September 13
- Location: Los Angeles Memorial Coliseum, Los Angeles
- Game start: 8:00 p.m. EST
- Game attendance: 93,607
- TV announcers (ABC): Brent Musburger & Kirk Herbstreit

Scoring summary
1	3:06	OSU	Ryan Pretorius 29-yard field goal	OSU 3-0
1	0:33	USC	Stanley Havili 35-yard pass from Mark Sanchez (David Buehler kick)	USC 7-3
2	11:00	USC	Blake Ayles 1-yard pass from Mark Sanchez (David Buehler kick)	USC 14-3
2	2:49	USC	Rey Maualuga 48-yard interception return (David Buehler kick)	USC 21-3
3	6:02	USC	Damian Williams 24-yard pass from Mark Sanchez (David Buehler kick)	USC 28-3
3	1:33	USC	Damian Williams 17-yard pass from Mark Sanchez (David Buehler kick)	USC 35-3

After a bye week, the Trojans hosted the Ohio State Buckeyes of the Big Ten Conference under head coach Jim Tressel. USC or Ohio State had played in five of the last six BCS title games. The non-conference game between two perennial powers had potential national championship implications for either program. A historic rivalry existed between the two teams: Between 1968 and 1984, they met six times in the Rose Bowl and determined the eventual National Champion in three of those contests. The teams had not faced one another since September 29, 1990, when Todd Marinovich led the Trojans to a 35–26 victory in Ohio Stadium in a game that was called because of a thunderstorm with 2 minutes 36 seconds to play.

By the end of the 2007–08 season, the game garnered interest as a possible early-season battle between top-10 teams. By the beginning of the season it was named as the most anticipated regular-season game of 2008. The winning team was assumed to have an inside track to the national title game, though, given recent trends in the title game, the loser also had a reasonable chance as well. In naming it the top potentially season-defining game of 2008, Sports Illustrated highlighted a theme of credibility: Ohio State enters the game trying to move past the BCS title game losses of the previous two seasons and USC enters trying to show it remains highly competitive with its new starting quarterback and four of five new players on the offensive line. The game was also viewed as a possible Heisman Trophy showdown, primarily between Ohio State's running back Chris "Beanie" Wells and USC's Sanchez. During the preseason Pac-10 Media Day, Carroll noted that "It's games like this that make us."

The Buckeyes featured a combination of quarterbacks: Fifth-year senior and All-Big-Ten quarterback Todd Boeckman continued to start for the Buckeyes, however in 2008 he was supplemented by highly regarded true-freshman quarterback Terrelle Pryor. The combination aimed to use Boeckman's prowess as a classic drop-back passer with Pryor's speed and ability to scramble for yards. The Trojans had particular concerns about Pryor, who had many of capabilities that made previous athletic scrambling quarterbacks, such as Dennis Dixon, Jake Locker and Vince Young, difficult for the defense to contain. The Buckeyes came in with a strong defense, led by All-American and Butkus Award-winning linebacker James Laurinaitis and cornerback Malcolm Jenkins. Both linebacking corps, highlighted by the Buckeyes' Laurinaitis and Marcus Freeman as well as the Trojans' Rey Maualuga and Brian Cushing, were considered the best in the country. One of the major storylines entering the game surrounded the health of Ohio State's star running back, Beanie Wells. Well injured his foot in the Buckeyes' opener, and sat out the second game of the season. Early during the week of the game he was cleared to play against the Trojans; however by the Thursday his presence assessed as doubtful after he experienced soreness in his foot one day after returning to practice.

Although scheduled for the third week of the season, the game was the primary focus of fan and media attention for both programs. Ticket prices rose to levels from $100 to $5,000 apiece. The game received heightened attention in national sports news when USC alumnus and starting quarterback for the NFL's Cincinnati Bengals, Carson Palmer told a radio show "I cannot stand the Buckeyes and having to live in Ohio and hear those people talk about their team, it drives me absolutely nuts [. . .] I just can't wait for this game to get here so they can come out to the Coliseum and experience L.A. and get an old-fashioned, Pac-10 butt-whupping." While Tressel defended Palmer's comments as those of fan, Ohio State fans were incensed. In the week before the game, Buckeyes wide receiver Ray Small stated that USC lacked the "class" of Ohio State, noting that "[A]t Ohio State, they teach you to be a better man. There, it's just all about football", further nothing that he felt that USC was "not even serious about the game." Sideline passes were in high demand, with celebrities such as Denzel Washington and Jamie Foxx in attendance.

USC and Ohio State opened the preseason ranked No. 2 and 3 in both the AP and Coaches Polls, swapping positions in each. After the Trojans' strong performance against Virginia, USC rose to No. 1 and Ohio State ranked No. 3 in both polls. However, after Ohio State struggled in their week 2 win against an unregarded Ohio team, they fell to No. 5 in both polls while USC remained No. 1. By game week the Trojans were considered 10-point favorites.

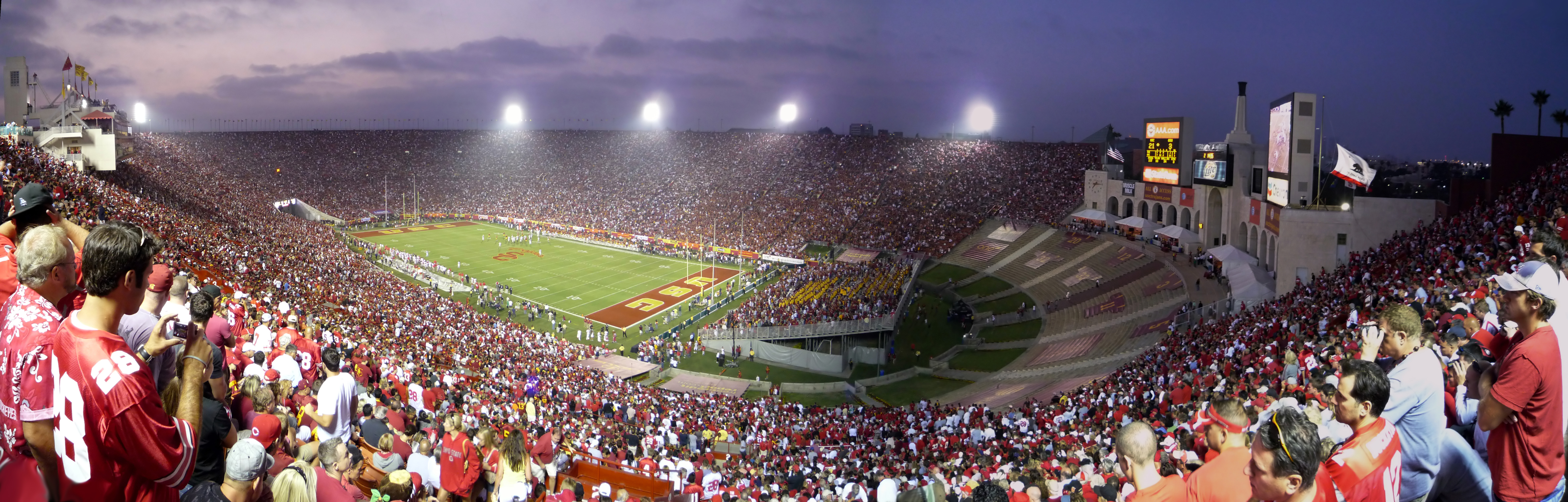
Ohio State at USC

=== Oregon State ===
	1	2	3	4	Total
Trojans	0	0	14	7	21
Beavers	7	14	0	6	27

The Trojans began their Pac-10 Conference schedule on the road against the Oregon State Beavers, under head coach Mike Riley, in Corvallis, Oregon. On their previous visit to Reser Stadium, during the 2006 season, the Beavers defeated the Trojans, 33–31, in a major upset; as such, the game was mentioned in the preseason as a possible upset for the Trojans.

Freshman Jacquizz Rodgers (#1) ran for 186 yards and two touchdowns for OSU, USC quarterback Mark Sanchez (#6) passed for 227 yards, and Damian Williams (#18) caught 80 yards for the top ranked Trojans in an upset loss.

Oregon State was the only Pac-10 Conference school to have beaten USC twice during the Pete Carroll era, until Oregon and Stanford equaled the feat in 2009.

=== Oregon ===
	1	2	3	4	Total
Ducks	7	3	0	0	10
Trojans	3	24	10	7	44

Before the season the game was named a game of interest and the second most interesting Pac-10 game to watch after Ohio State-USC, in part due to the potential battle for the top of the conference.

=== Arizona State ===
	1	2	3	4	Total
Sun Devils	0	0	0	0	0
Trojans	7	14	0	7	28

Entering the season, Arizona State was named as a possible challenger to USC's dominance of the Pac-10.

=== Washington State ===
#6 USC Trojans (4–1) at Washington State Cougars (1–6)

Quarter	1	2	3	4	Total
USC	21	20	7	21	69
Washington St	0	0	0	0	0

at Martin Stadium • Pullman, Washington

- Date: October 18
- Game time: 12:30 p.m. PDT
- Game weather: Overcast • 55 °F (13 °C) • Wind S 5 miles per hour (8.0 km/h; 4.3 kn)
- Game attendance: 25,118
- Referee: Larry Farina
- USC Official Athletic Site

Game information

USC

- Mark Sanchez
  15/20, 253 Yds, 5 TD
- Broderick Green
  18 Rush, 121 Yds, 2 TD
- Ronald Johnson
  5 Rec, 94 Yds, 2 TD

Washington St

- Kevin Lopina
  6/9, 28 Yds, INT
- Logwone Mitz
  19 Rush, 52 Yds
- Jeshua Anderson
  4 Rec, 29 Yds

=== Arizona ===
	1	2	3	4	Total
Trojans	3	7	7	0	17
Wildcats	0	3	7	0	10

=== Washington ===
	1	2	3	4	Total
Huskies	0	0	0	0	0
Trojans	21	21	7	7	56

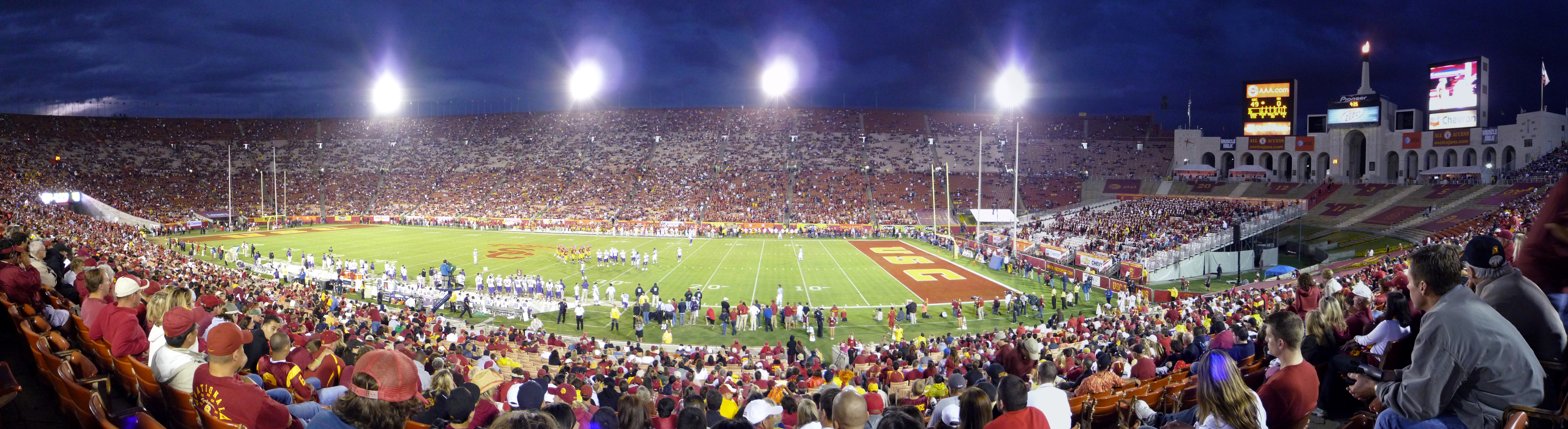
The announced crowd of over 80,000 dissipated by midway though the fourth quarter, as the Trojans, using second and third team players, were already leading 49–0.

=== California ===
	1	2	3	4	Total
Golden Bears	0	3	0	0	3
Trojans	3	7	0	7	17

This game was mentioned as a possible upset for the Trojans.

=== Stanford ===
	1	2	3	4	Total
Trojans	3	14	7	21	45
Cardinal	10	7	0	6	23

Before the 2007 season, Stanford head coach Jim Harbaugh, in his first year with the Cardinal, garnered attention by first stating that 2007 was going to be Carroll's last year at USC, then, during the Pac-10 media day, that USC "may be the best team in the history of college football." The Cardinal then stunned the Trojans in a major upset, 24–23, ending the Trojans' 35-game home winning streak and causing a major obstacle to the Trojans national title hopes. During the 2008 Pac-10 media day, noted that the aftermath of the Cardinal's victory over USC was "water under the bridge." Given the previous season, before the season it was named as a game to watch by ESPN.com.

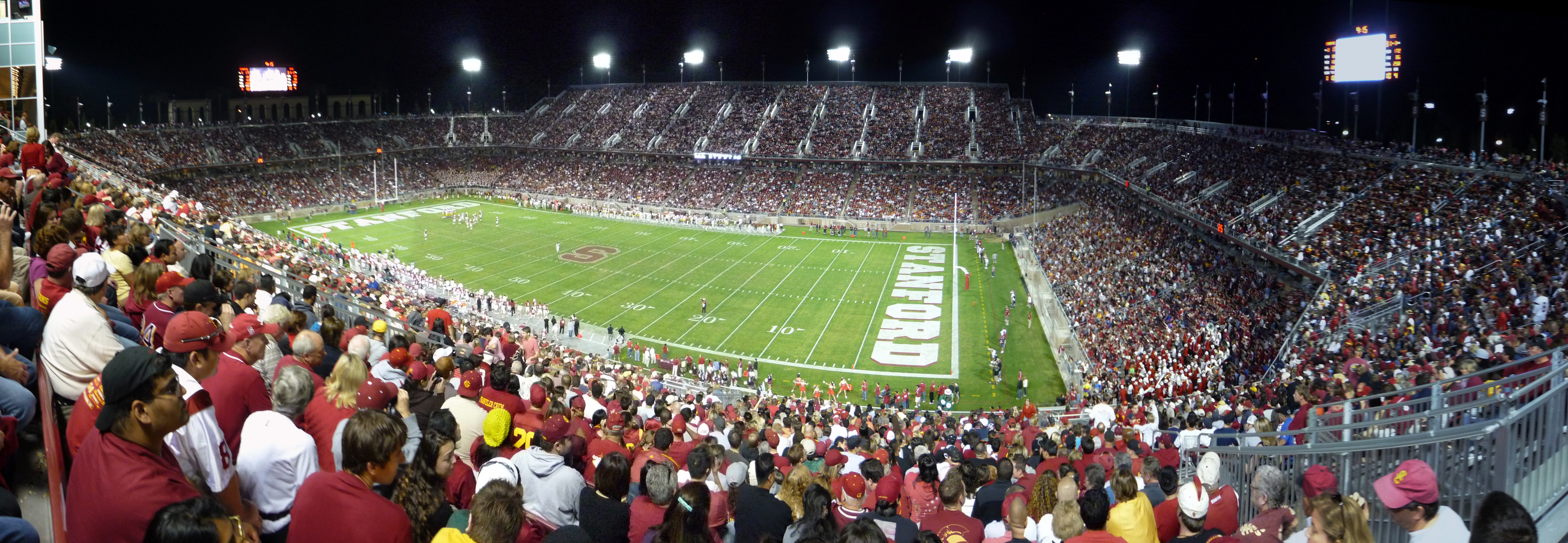
The game marked the first sell out of the new Stanford Stadium since its opening in 2006; a large portion of the crowd were in support of USC.

=== Notre Dame ===
Team	1	2	3	4	Total
Notre Dame	0	0	0	3	3
• USC	7	17	7	7	38

- Date: November 29
- Location: Los Angeles Memorial Coliseum, Los Angeles
- Game start: 8:00 p.m. EST
- Television network: ESPN

Scoring summary
1	4:06	USC	Stafon Johnson 2-yard run (David Buehler kick)	USC 7-0
2	9:05	USC	Joe McKnight 55-yard run (David Buehler kick)	USC 14-0
2	4:38	USC	Damian Williams 12-yard pass from Mark Sanchez (David Buehler kick)	USC 21-0
2	0:24	USC	David Buehler 35-yard field goal	USC 24-0
3	5:03	USC	C.J. Gable 1-yard run (David Buehler kick)	USC 31-0
4	11:45	ND	Brandon Walker 41-yard field goal	USC 31-3
4	7:57	USC	Patrick Turner 17-yard pass from Mark Sanchez (David Buehler kick)	USC 38-3

=== UCLA ===
Team	1	2	3	4	Total
• USC	14	7	7	0	28
UCLA	7	0	0	0	7

- Date: December 6
- Location: Rose Bowl, Pasadena, California
- Game start: 4:30 p.m. EST
- Television network: ABC

Scoring summary
1	11:07	UCLA	Kahlil Bell 21-yard pass from Dominique Johnson (Kai Forbath kick)	UCLA 7-0
1	3:34	USC	Joe McKnight 12-yard run (David Buehler kick)	Tied 7-7
1	1:09	USC	Damian Williams 12-yard pass from Mark Sanchez (David Buehler kick)	USC 14-7
2	1:55	USC	Stafon Johnson 2-yard run (David Buehler kick)	USC 21-7
3	12:31	USC	Patrick Turner 18-yard pass from Mark Sanchez (David Buehler kick)	USC 28-7

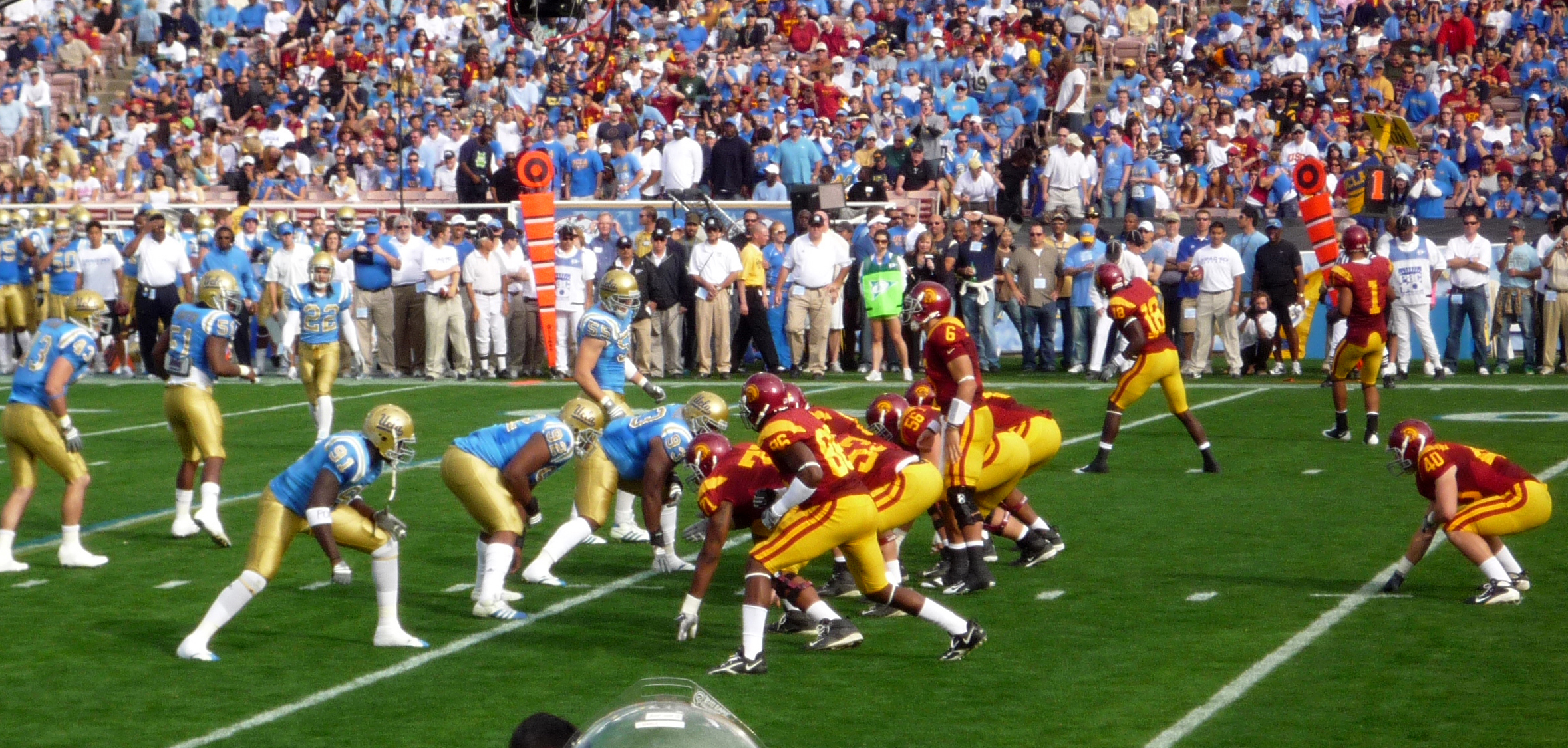
The 2008 edition of the rivalry marked a return to the tradition of both teams playing in home jerseys.

Before the season this game garnered interest in seeing how new Bruins' coach Rick Neuheisel would do in his battle to gain supremacy in Los Angeles.

Joe McKnight (12-yard run), Damian Williams (12-yard pass from Mark Sanchez), Stafon Johnson (2-yard run) and Patrick Turner (18-yard pass from Sanchez) scored for the Trojans. Sanchez passed for 269 yards, McKnight ran for 99 yards and Turner caught for 81 yards.

A fumble recovery turned into a pass reception touchdown by Kahlil Bell in the beginning of the game was all the scoring by the Bruins in this the latest cross-town rivalry game. UCLA Quarterback Kevin Craft completed 11 out of 28 passes for a total of 89 yards and had one pass intercepted.

Going into the game, the Trojans were set to be, at worst, co-Pac-10 Champions with Oregon State. However, after the win over UCLA and Oregon State's loss the same day, the Trojans became the Pac-10 Champions for the seventh straight year and qualified for the Rose Bowl, played on January 1, 2009. Linebacker Rey Maualuga was named Pac-10 defensive player of the year.

=== Rose Bowl versus Penn State ===
Team	1	2	3	4	Total
Penn State	7	0	0	17	24
• USC	7	24	0	7	38

- Date: January 1
- Location: Rose Bowl, Pasadena, California
- Game start: 5:10 p.m. EST
- TV announcers (ABC): Brent Musburger & Kirk Herbstreit

Scoring summary
1	4:12	USC	Damian Williams 27-yard pass from Mark Sanchez (David Buehler kick)	USC 7-0
1	0:04	PSU	Daryll Clark 9-yard run (Kevin Kelly kick)	Tied 7-7
2	12:27	USC	Mark Sanchez 6-yard run (David Buehler kick)	USC 14-7
2	7:00	USC	David Buehler 30-yard field goal	USC 17-7
2	1:24	USC	Ronald Johnson 19-yard pass from Mark Sanchez (David Buehler kick)	USC 24-7
2	0:36	USC	C.J. Gable 20-yard pass from Mark Sanchez (David Buehler kick)	USC 31-7
4	13:33	PSU	Derrick Williams 2-yard pass from Daryll Clark (Kevin Kelly kick)	USC 31-14
4	12:02	USC	Ronald Johnson 45-yard pass from Mark Sanchez (David Buehler kick)	USC 38-14
4	7:22	PSU	Kevin Kelly 25-yard field goal	USC 38-17
4	4:24	PSU	Jordan Norwood 9-yard pass from Daryll Clark (Kevin Kelly kick)	USC 38-24

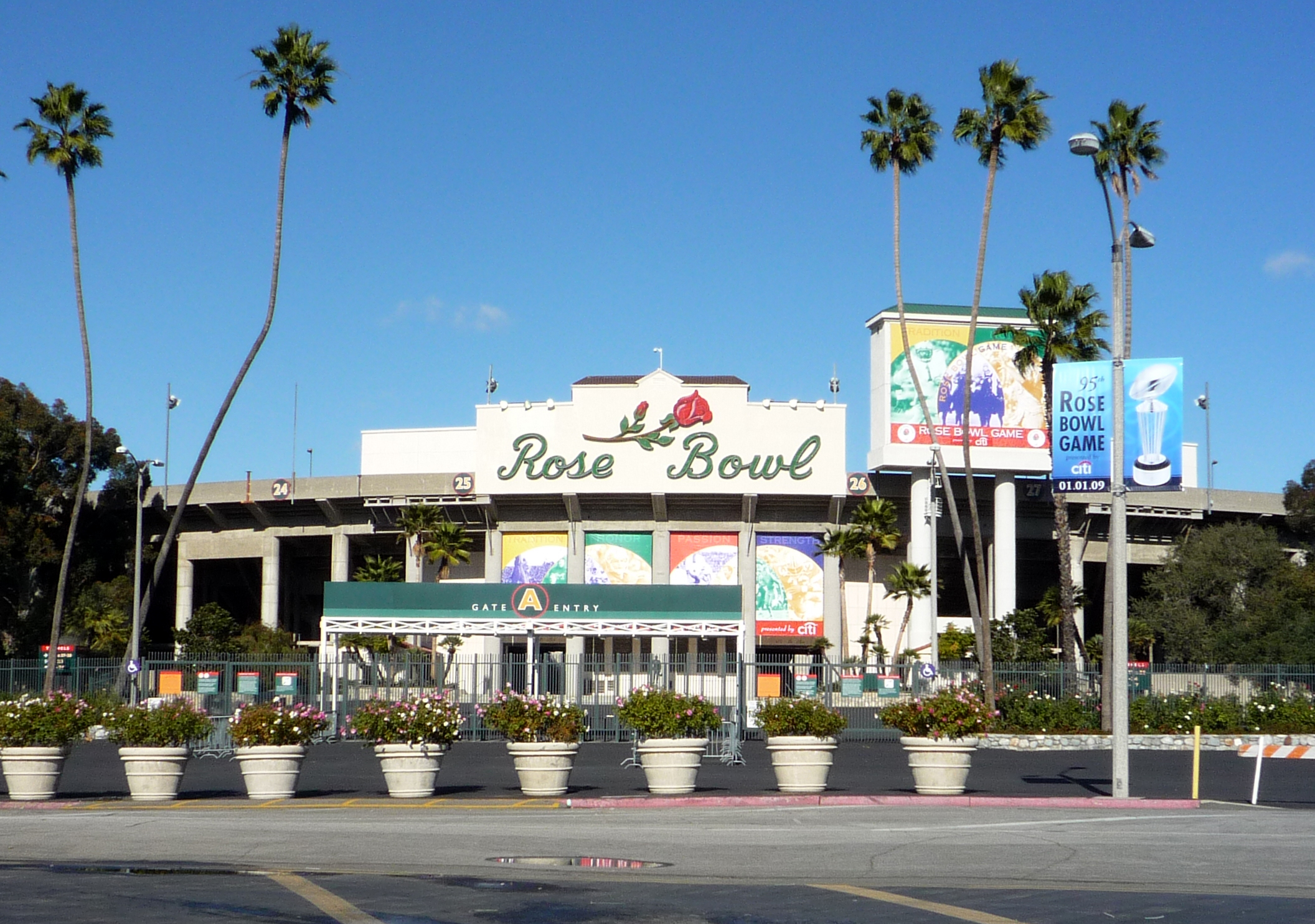
The Rose Bowl, prepared for the 95th edition of the nation's oldest bowl game.

== Rankings ==
Ranking movements Legend: ██ Increase in ranking ██ Decrease in ranking т = Tied with team above or below
	Week																
Poll	Pre	1	2	3	4	5	6	7	8	9	10	11	12	13	14	15	Final
AP	3	1	1	1	1	9	8	6	6	7	7	6	6	5	5	5	3
Coaches	2	1	1	1	1	9	9	4	4	6	6	6	6	5	5	4-T	2
Harris	Not released					7	8	5	5	7	7	6	6	5	5	5	Not released
BCS	Not released								5	5	7	6	6	5	5	5	Not released

== After the season ==
=== Awards ===
- Rey Maualuga won the Bednarik Award.
- Rey Maualuga was the CBS Sportsline.com Defensive Player of the Year.
- Rey Maualuga was named the Pac-10 Defensive Player of the Year.
- Rey Maualuga was the USC Team MVP.
- Rey Maualuga, Taylor Mays and Brian Cushing were named First Team All-American.
- Fili Moala (Sporting News) was named Second Team All-American.
- Mark Sanchez, Kevin Ellison, and Clay Matthews III were named All-America honorable mention.
- Kristofer O'Dowd was named to the College Football News Sophomore All-America Second Team.
- Damian Williams was named College Football News Sophomore All-America honorable mention.
- Mark Sanchez, Kristofer O'Dowd, Rey Maualuga, Taylor Mays, Brian Cushing, Fili Moala, Kevin Ellison, Jeff Byers (rivals.com) and David Buehler were named First Team All-Pac-10.
- Patrick Turner, Clay Matthews III (rivals.com), and Kaluka Maiava were named Second Team All-Pac-10.
- Charles Brown (offensive lineman), Anthony McCoy, Josh Pinkard, Cary Harris, Kyle Moore, Joe McKnight and Damian Williams were named honorable mention All-Pac-10.

=== NFL draft ===
Twelve USC players were invited to the NFL Combine. Of the twelve, Josh Pinkard applied for and was granted a sixth season of eligibility by the NCAA and opted to stay at USC for another season. Of the eleven players who attended the Combine, all were drafted by the end of the sixth round of the 2009 NFL draft. USC topped the total number of draftees for the second consecutive season.
