= Mitch =

Mitch is a short form of the masculine given name Mitchell. It is also sometimes a nickname, usually for a person with the surname Mitchell. It may refer to:

== People ==
- Mitch Albom (born 1958), American author, journalist, and musician
- Mitch Allan, American record producer, songwriter, and singer
- Mitch Altman (born 1956), American hacker and inventor
- Mitch Apau (born 1990), Dutch footballer
- Mitch Austin (born 1991), Australian footballer
- Mitch Benn (born 1970), English comedian and satirist, known for his musical parodies
- Mitch Berger (born 1972), Canadian National Football League punter
- Mitch Bouyer (1837–1876), American interpreter and guide in the Old West
- Mitch Brown (disambiguation), several people
- Mitch Clark (disambiguation), several people
- Mitch Clarke (born 1985), Canadian mixed martial artist
- Mitch Clarke (basketball) (born 1999), Australian basketball player
- Mitch Cornish (born 1993), Australian rugby league player
- Mitch Creek (born 1992), Australian basketball player
- Mitch Daniels (born 1949), American academic administrator, businessman, author and retired politician, 49th Governor of Indiana
- Mitch Duke (born 1991), Australian professional soccer player
- Mitch English (born 1969), American morning talk show host, comedian, actor, reporter and weatherman
- Mitch Epstein (born 1952), American art photographer
- Mitch Evans (born 1994), New Zealander racing driver
- Mitch Fatel (born 1968), American stand-up comedian
- Mitch Garber (born 1964), Canadian lawyer, investor and business executive
- Mitch Garver (born 1991), American baseball player
- Mitch Gaylord (born 1961), American Olympic champion gymnast
- Mitch Georgiades (born 2001), Australian rules footballer
- Mitch Glasser (born 1989), American-Israeli baseball player
- Mitch Glazer (born 1952/1953), American writer, producer, and actor
- Mitch Glazier (born 1966), American lawyer and lobbyist
- Mitch Golby (born 1991), Australian rules footballer
- Mitch Gore, American politician from Indiana
- Mitch Grassi (born 1992), American musician, YouTube personality, and member of a capella band Pentatonix
- Mitch Green (born 1957), American professional boxer
- Mitch Greenlick (1935–2020), American politician
- Mitch Haniger (born 1990), American baseball player
- Mitch Harris (born 1970), American guitarist and member of England-based grindcore band Napalm Death
- Mitch Hedberg (1968–2005), American stand-up comedian
- Mitch Hewer (born 1989), British actor
- Mitch Hinge (born 1998), professional Australian rules footballer
- Mitch Holleman (born 1994), American actor
- Mitch Horowitz (born 1965), American author, publisher, speaker, and television host
- Mitchell Hurwitz (born 1963), American television writer, producer and actor
- Mitch Hyatt (born 1997), American football player
- Mitch Jebb (born 2002), American baseball player
- Mitch Jones (born 1977), American Major League Baseball outfielder
- Mitch Jones (streamer) (born 1992), American Twitch streamer and musician
- Mitch Kapor (born 1950), American entrepreneur
- Mitch Keller (born 1996), American baseball player
- Mitch Kupchak (born 1954), American National Basketball Association player and general manager
- Mitch Landrieu (born 1960), American politician and lawyer
- Mitch Lasky (born 1962), American businessman
- Mitch Lewis (born 1954), Canadian multi-instrumentalist
- Mitch Little, American politician
- Mitch Lucker (1984–2012), American vocalist of extreme metal band Suicide Silence
- Mitch Margo (1947–2017), American singer and songwriter
- Mitch Marner (born 1997), Canadian ice hockey player for the Toronto Maple Leafs
- Mitchell Marsh (born 1991), Australian cricketer
- Mitch McConnell (born 1942), American politician and former U.S. Senate majority leader
- Mitch Merrett, Canadian record producer
- Mitch Miller (1911–2010), American oboist, conductor, recording producer and recording industry executive
- Mitch Mitchell (1946–2008), English drummer with The Jimi Hendrix Experience
- Mitch Molloy (1965–2024), Canadian ice hockey player
- Mitch Moreland (born 1985), American professional baseball player
- Mitch Morris (born 1979), American actor
- Mitch Mullany (1968–2008), American stand-up comedian, actor, screenwriter, and author
- Mitch Murray (born 1940), English songwriter, record producer and author
- Mitch Mustain (born 1988), American college football player
- Mitch Nilsson (born 1991), Australian professional baseball player
- Mitch Pacwa (born 1949), American Jesuit priest
- Mitch Pileggi (born 1952), American actor best known for his role in The X-Files
- Mitch Potter (born 1980), American track and field athlete
- Mitch Richmond (born 1965), American basketball player
- Mitch Robinson (born 1989), Australian rules footballer
- Mitch Schauer (born 1955), American animation professional
- Mitch Seavey (born 1959), American dog musher
- Mitch Singer (born 1955), American lawyer and digital media executive
- Mitch Snyder (1943–1990), American activist
- Mitchell Trubisky (born 1994), American National Football League quarterback
- Mitch Valize (born 1995), Dutch para-cyclist
- Mitch Vogel (born 1956), American child actor, musician and director
- Mitch Ward (born 1971), English footballer
- Mitch Webster (born 1959), American baseball player
- Mitch White (baseball) (born 1994), American baseball player
- Mitch White (footballer, born 1996), Australian rules footballer
- Mitch Williams (born 1964), American Major League Baseball relief pitcher
- Mitch Williams (politician) (born 1953), Australian politician and farmer
- Mitch Wishnowsky (born 1992), American football player
- Mitch Young (born 1961), American football player

== Stage or ring name ==
- Mitch Ryder, stage name of American musician William S. Levise, Jr. (born 1945)
- Mitch, ring name of wrestler Nick Mitchell

== Fictional characters ==
- Mitch Buchannon, main character of the TV series Baywatch, played by David Hasselhoff
- "Mitch", the self-given nickname of Mitsuhiro Higa, The Ultimate Soccer Player, from Danganronpa Another: Another Despair Academy
- Mitch Laurence, in the soap opera One Life to Live
- Mitch Leery, a character in the TV series Dawson's Creek who is Dawson's father
- Mitch Mitchelson, a villain in The Powerpuff Girls
- Mitch Rapp, the main character in a series of novels by Vince Flynn
- Mitch Szalinski, in the movie Honey, We Shrunk Ourselves
- Mitch Williams (General Hospital), in the soap opera General Hospital
- "Mitch", nickname of Harold Mitchell, one of the principal characters in A Streetcar Named Desire
- Mitch, the main character in the movie City Slickers
- Mitch, a character in Whatever Happened to... Robot Jones?
- Mitch, in the movie Old School, played by Luke Wilson
- Mitch Blake, a character in the soap opera Another World
- Mitch "Muscle Man" Sorenstein, a character in the Cartoon Network animated series Regular Show
- Detective Mitch Kellaway, detective in the 1994 movie The Mask
- Tom “Mitch” Mitchell, title character of the TV series Mitch.

== Animals ==
- Mitch (Meerkat Manor), a meerkat in the television series Meerkat Manor

== Storms ==
- Hurricane Mitch, a deadly category 5 hurricane that impacted Central America in 1998.

== See also ==
- Colin Mitchell (1925–1996), British Army lieutenant colonel nicknamed "Mad Mitch"
