= Mitchell (given name) =

Mitchell or Mitchel, sometimes abbreviated as Mitch, is a male given name, derived from the surname. It is Anglo-Norman in origin.

== People ==
- Mitchell Agude (born 1999), American football player
- Mitchell Aubusson (born 1987), Australian rugby league footballer
- Mitch Austin (born 1991), Australian footballer
- Mitchell Ayres (1909–1969), American orchestra leader, music arranger, composer and performer
- Mitchell Baker (born 1957), American chairperson of the Mozilla Foundation
- Mitchell Baker (footballer), (born 2006), Indonesian footballer
- Mitchel Bakker (born 2000), Dutch footballer
- Mitchel Bergkamp (born 1998), Dutch footballer
- Mitch Benn (born 1970), English comedian and satirist, known for his musical parodies
- Mitch Berman (born 1956), American fiction writer
- Mitchell Berman (politician) (born 1986), U.S. Representative-elect from Wisconsin
- Mitchell N. Berman, American Professor of Law at the University of Pennsylvania Law School
- Mitchell Boggs (born 1984), American Major League Baseball pitcher
- Mitch Brown (rugby league) (born 1987), Australian rugby league player
- Mitchell Burgess, American Emmy Award-winning writer and producer
- Mitchell Butler (born 1970), American sports agent and former basketball player
- Mitchel Candlin (born 2000), English footballer
- Mitch Clark (Australian footballer) (born 1987), Australian rules footballer
- Mitch Clark (footballer, born 1999), Welsh footballer
- Mitchell Cole (1985–2012), English footballer
- Mitchell Cornett, American politician
- Mitch Cornish (born 1993), Australian rugby league player
- Mitchell Dodds (born 1989), Australian rugby league player
- Mitchell Doens (1946–2026), Panamanian politician and economist
- Mitchell Donald (born 1988), Dutch footballer
- Mitch Easter (born 1954), American musician, songwriter, and record producer
- Mitchell Englander (born 1970), American politician
- Mitchell Feigenbaum (1944–2019), American mathematical physicist
- Mitchel Frame (born 2006), Scottish footballer
- Mitchell Froom (born 1953), American musician and record producer
- Mitchell Gale (born 1990), American football player
- Mitch Golby (born 1991), Australian rules footballer
- Mitch Grassi (born 1992), American musician, YouTube personality, and member of a capella band Pentatonix
- Mitch Harris (born 1970), American guitarist and member of the grindcore band Napalm Death
- Mitch Hedberg (1968–2005), American comedian
- Mitchell Henry (1826–1910), English financier, politician and Member of Parliament
- Mitchell Hepburn (1896–1953), Canadian politician, youngest premier of Ontario
- Mitch Hewer (born 1989), British actor who plays Maxxie in Skins
- Mitchell Hope (born 1994), Australian actor
- Mitchell Hurwitz (born 1963), American television writer and producer, creator of Arrested Development and co-creator of The Ellen Show
- Mitchell Islam (born 1990), Canadian ice dancer
- Mitchell Jenkins 1896–1977), American politician
- Mitchell Joachim (born 1972), American architect and professor
- Mitchell Johnson (disambiguation), several people
- Mitch Kapor (born 1950), chairman of Mozilla Foundation
- Mitch Kupchak (born 1954), American National Basketball Association player and general manager
- Mitch Landrieu (born 1960), American politician
- Mitchel Lasser, American lawyer and law professor
- Mitchell Lawrie (born 2010), Scottish darts player
- Mitch Lewis (born 1954), Canadian multi-instrumentalist
- Mitch Lucker (1984–2012), American vocalist of the extreme metal band Suicide Silence
- Mitchell Langerak (born 1988), Australian football goalkeeper
- Mitchell Leisen (1898–1972), American director, art director and costume designer
- Mitchell Lewis (actor) (1880–1956), American film actor
- Mitchell Lewis (footballer) (born 1998), Australian footballer
- Mitchel H. Mark (1868–1918), pioneer of motion picture exhibition in the United States
- Mitch Marner (born 1997), Canadian ice hockey player
- Mitchell Marsh (born 1991), Australian cricketer
- Mitchell McClenaghan (born 1986), New Zealand cricketer
- Mitch McConnell (born 1942), United States senator
- Mitchel McLaughlin (born 1945), former politician in Northern Ireland
- Mitch Miller (1911–2010), American musician
- Mitchell Moore (1988–2009), American murder victim
- Mitch Mustain (born 1988), American college football player
- Mitchel Musso (born 1991), American child actor and singer
- Mitchel Oviedo (born 1988), Mexican former footballer
- Mitchell Page (1951–2011), American Major League Baseball player
- Mitchell Paige (1918–2003), American Marine awarded the Medal of Honor in World War II
- Mitchel Paulissen (born 1993), Dutch footballer
- Mitchell Pearce (born 1989), Australian rugby league footballer
- Mitchell Perry (born 2000), Australian cricketer
- Mitch Pileggi (born 1952), American actor
- Mitch Potter (born 1980), American track and field athlete
- Mitchell Rales (born 1956), American businessman and art collector
- Mitchel Resnick (born 1956), American computer scientist
- Mitch Richmond (born 1965), American National Basketball Association player
- Mitch Robinson (born 1989), Australian rules footballer
- Mitchell Ryan (1934–2022), American actor
- Mitchell Schwartz (born 1989), American collegiate and National Football League player
- Mitchell Scoggins, American politician
- Mitchell Sharp (1911–2004), Canadian politician
- Mitchell Starc (born 1990), Australian cricketer
- Mitchel Steenman (born 1984), Dutch rower
- Mitchell Swepson (born 1993), Australian cricketer
- Mitchell Symons (born 1957), British writer
- Mitchell Thomas (born 1964), English footballer
- Mitchell Tinsley (born 1999), American football player
- Mitchell Torok (1929–2017), American country music singer, songwriter and guitarist
- Mitchell Trubisky (born 1994), American football player
- Mitchell Ward, American football player
- Mitchell Watt (born 1988), Australian long jumper
- Mitchell Weiser (born 1994), German footballer
- Mitchell WerBell III, a U.S. Office of Strategic Services (OSS) operative, mercenary, paramilitary trainer, firearms engineer, and arms dealer
- Mitchell Wiggins (born 1959), American retired basketball player
- Mitchell Wilcox (born 1996), American football player
- Mitch Williams (born 1964), Major League Baseball relief pitcher
- Mitchel Wongsodikromo (born 1985), Surinamese badminton player and coach
- Mitch Young (born 1961), American football player

== Fictional characters ==
- Mitch Buchannon, the main character of Baywatch
- Mitchell Mayo / Condiment King, villain of Batman from DC Comics
- Mitch McColl, in the soap opera Home and Away
- Mitchell Pritchett, a main character in Modern Family

== See also ==
- Mitchell (surname)
