= Giraffic =

- Type: Private
- Industry: Cloud Storage
- Founded: 2008
- Headquarters: Tel Aviv, Israel
- Key people: Yoel Zanger
- Products: Adaptive Video Accelerator (AVA) and Distributed Adaptive Storage & Streaming (DASS)
- Services: Streaming media content delivery acceleration; Mobile-to-mobile file transfer acceleration; Mobile video acceleration
- Website: www.giraffic.com

Giraffic is a Tel Aviv-based company that had developed "Adaptive Video Acceleration" (AVA) software to improve the performance of streaming video. It sold primarily to OTT Video Apps Providers and to Consumer Electronics Device Manufacturers, such as LG, ZTE and Samsung.

Giraffic's AVA technology was acquired in 2019 by Roku, Inc. The Company claimed to continue development of its Distributed Adaptive Storage (DASS) technology towards distributed storage systems, creating a distributed online backup service for consumers based on blockchain technology.

== History ==
The company was founded in 2008 by Gil Gat, Boris Malamud and Yoel Zanger. Prior to co-founding Giraffic, Yoel Zanger co-founded New-Tone Technologies, a value-added services platform for mobile applications based on advanced voice and data technologies.

Giraffic was headquartered in Tel Aviv, Israel. Prior to its 2019 acquisition by Roku, it had sales offices in the United States, Korea, and Hong Kong. Key personnel included Menashe Rothschild, Jeffrey Parkinson, Bhupen Shah, Anton Monk, Gregg Bernard, Mitch Singer, and Levy Gerzberg. Investors included KEC Ventures, Samsung Ventures and Previz Ventures.

== Technologies ==
Giraffic's Adaptive Video Acceleration (AVA) software debuted at CES 2015, where the company demonstrated its video product on Samsung Smart TVs, Broadcom IP set-top boxes, and Intel Puma Home Gateway.

Giraffic's Distributed Adaptive Storage and Streaming (DASS) software was deployed 2010–2012 as a peer-to-peer Content Delivery Network (P2P-CDN) by video websites including Veoh.com, Mako.co.il and Craze Digital. In 2020 the company pivoted this technology towards development of distributed online backup service for consumers.

== Patents ==
- US Patent 14/287,276 IL 231685 SYSTEM AND METHOD FOR PREDICTIVE BUFFERING AND NETWORK SHAPING
- US Patent 9306860. A congestion control method for dynamically maximizing communication link throughput. Filing date, October 14, 2013
- US Patent 8473610. Proactive Storage. Filing date, June 22, 2011
- U.S. patent 20120054260A1. Asynchronous data streaming in a distributed network. Issued March 1, 2012

== Partners ==
Samsung and LG use Giraffic's Adaptive Video Acceleration (AVA) technology.

== Competition ==
Companies who competed with Giraffic included Akamai and Google.
