= Mitchell Johnson (disambiguation) =

Mitchell Johnson is an Australian former cricketer. It may also refer to:

- Mitchell Scott Johnson (born 1984), one of the juvenile perpetrators of the Westside School shooting
- Mitch Johnson (American football) (born 1942), American football player
- Mitchell Johnson (artist), American contemporary artist
- Mitch Johnson (born 1986), American basketball coach
- Paperboy (rapper) (Mitchell Charles Johnson, born 1969), American rapper

== See also ==
- List of people with surname Johnson
- Mitchell (given name)
