= Kris O'Dowd =

American football player (born 1988)

Kristofer O'Dowd
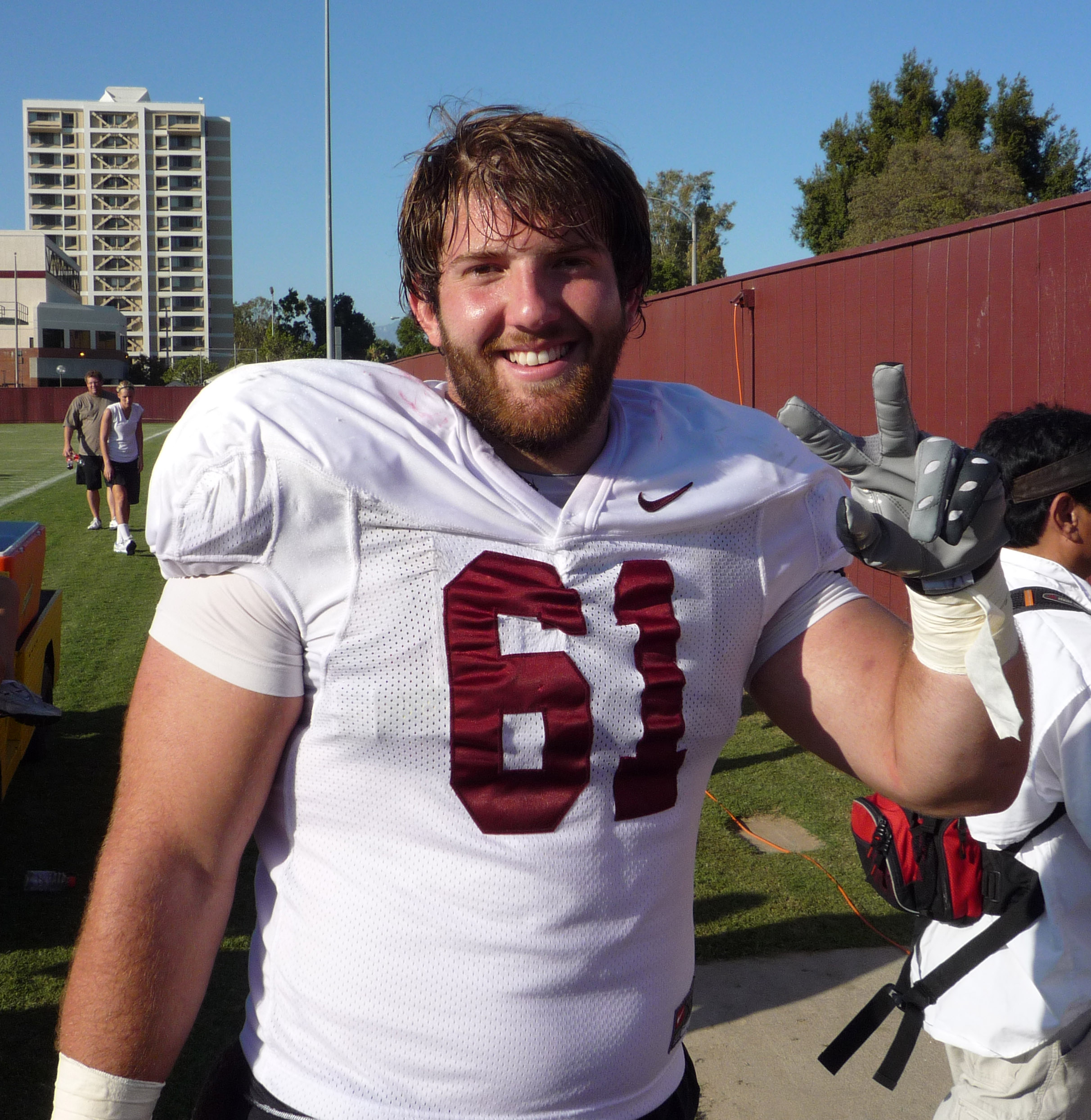
- O'Dowd makes the USC "V" for victory sign after a 2008 fall practice at USC

No. 60
- Position: Center

Personal information
- Born: May 14, 1988 (age 38); Tucson, Arizona, U.S.
- Listed height: 6 ft 4 in (1.93 m)
- Listed weight: 304 lb (138 kg)

Career information
- High school: Salpointe (Tucson)
- College: USC
- NFL draft: 2011: undrafted

Career history
- Arizona Cardinals (2011)*; New York Jets (2012)*; Seattle Seahawks (2012)*
- * Offseason or practice squad member only

Awards and highlights
- First-team All-Pac-10 (2008); Second-team Sophomore All-American (2008); USC Offensive Lineman of the year (2008)
- Stats at Pro Football Reference

Kristofer O'Dowd (born May 14, 1988) is an American former college football player who was a center for the USC Trojans. He was signed by the Arizona Cardinals of the National Football League (NFL) as an undrafted free agent in 2011.

== Early life ==
O'Dowd's 2006 honors included Parade All-American, EA Sports All-American first-team, Super Prep All-American, Prep Star All-American, USA Today All-USA second-team, Super Prep Elite 50, Prep Star 100, Rivals.com 100, Super Prep All-Farwest, Prep Star All-West, Scout.com All-West, Long Beach Press-Telegram Best in the West first-team, Orange County Register Fab 15 first-team, Tacoma News-Tribune Western 100 and All-State as a senior offensive lineman at Salpointe Catholic High in Tucson (Ariz.). He was also invited to play in the 2007 U.S. Army All-American Bowl alongside fellow USC recruits Marc Tyler, Chris Galippo, and Everson Griffen. He recorded 90 pancake blocks in 2006. As a junior in 2005, he made the All-State first-team. He also attended Salpointe Catholic Highschool in Tucson, Arizona.

== College career ==
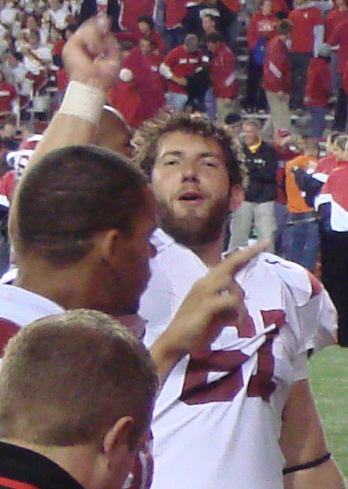
O'Dowd celebrates a USC victory over Nebraska in 2007.

At the University of Southern California, the 6-foot-5, 300-pound O'Dowd became the first true freshman in Trojans history to start a game at center. According to USC officials, the last true freshman to start an opener on the offensive line was guard Travis Claridge against Penn State in 1996. Guard Brad Budde was the only other true freshman offensive lineman to start a post-World War II opener. Budde played against Missouri in 1976. His sophomore year, he was named to the 2008 First-team All-Pac-10.

He suffered a kneecap injury before the 2009 season, and had to sit out the opener against San Jose State; his spot was filled in by veteran tackle Jeff Byers.

== Professional career ==
=== Arizona Cardinals ===
Despite being considered the 3rd best Center prospect in the NFL draft, O'Dowd was not selected in the 2011 NFL draft. He was signed as a free agent by the Arizona Cardinals. He was released on September 2, 2011.

=== New York Jets ===
The New York Jets signed O'Dowd on March 13, 2012. He was waived on May 6, 2012.

=== Seattle Seahawks ===
O'Dowd was signed by the Seattle Seahawks on August 16, 2012.
