= Damian Williams (wide receiver) =

American football player (born 1988)

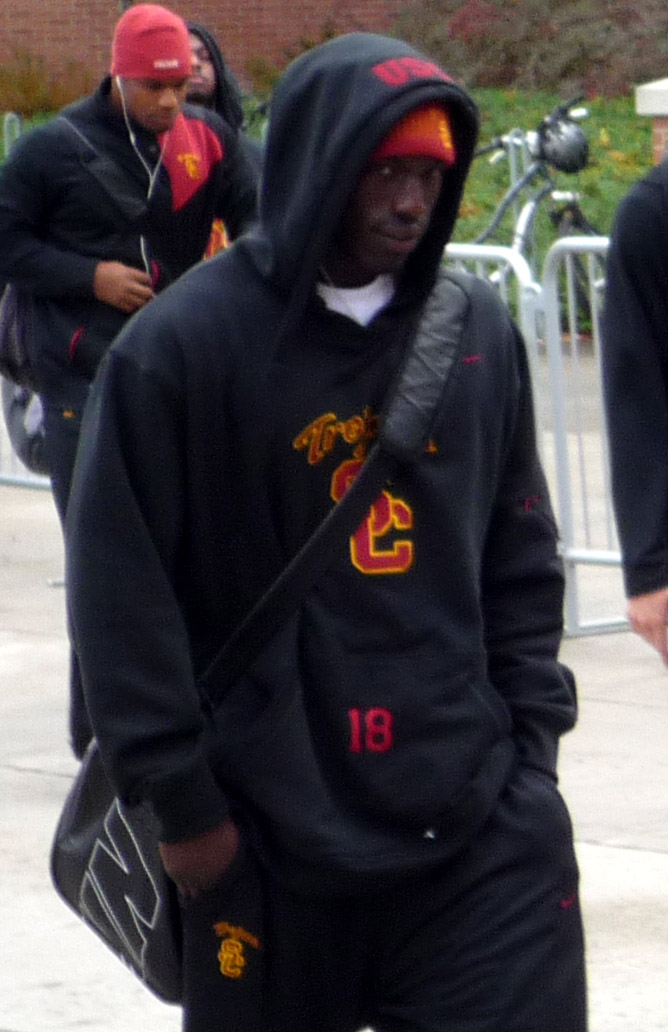
- Williams while at USC in 2008

No. 17, 15, 10
- Position: Wide receiver

Personal information
- Born: May 26, 1988 (age 38); Springdale, Arkansas, U.S.
- Listed height: 6 ft 1 in (1.85 m)
- Listed weight: 193 lb (88 kg)

Career information
- High school: Springdale (AR)
- College: Arkansas; USC
- NFL draft: 2010: 3rd round, 77th overall pick

Career history
- Tennessee Titans (2010–2013); Miami Dolphins (2014); St. Louis Rams (2014)

Awards and highlights
- 2006 Freshman All-SEC Team; First-team All-Pac-10 (2009)

Career NFL statistics
- Receptions: 107
- Receiving yards: 1,327
- Receiving touchdowns: 5
- Stats at Pro Football Reference

Damian Lamar Williams (born May 26, 1988) is an American former professional football player who was a wide receiver in the National Football League (NFL) from 2010 through 2014. He played college football for the Arkansas Razorbacks and USC Trojans. Selected in the third round of the 2010 NFL draft, he played in the league for the Tennessee Titans, Miami Dolphins, and St. Louis Rams.

== Early life ==
Williams attended Springdale High School under head coach Gus Malzahn. During his senior year, he played wide receiver, running back and defensive back and earned accolades as an All-American, catching 63 passes for 1,495 yards with 24 touchdowns, running for 463 yards on 31 carries with 12 touchdowns and had eight kickoff returns for 254 yards with two touchdowns on offense, while also making 25 tackles and 3 interceptions (one for a touchdown) on defense despite missing several games with injuries. Springdale went 14-0 in 2005, won the Arkansas state championship and finished No. 2 nationally.

Williams initially planned on attending the University of Florida, but, in February 2006, switched to Arkansas, joining three other star teammates who had already committed.

== College career ==
=== Arkansas ===
Growing up in Springdale, Arkansas, Williams began his college career at nearby University of Arkansas, joining Springdale High School teammates and star recruits, quarterback Mitch Mustain, and tight end Ben Cleveland. Head coach Houston Nutt's Razorbacks football team had hired the trio's high school coach, Gus Malzahn, as his offensive coordinator a few months before signing day. As a first-year freshman, Williams started 5 games for the Razorbacks and appeared in all 13 games, catching 19 passes for 235 yards and 2 touchdowns while ranking second in receptions on the team. He was honored as a 2006 Sporting News Freshman Third-team All-American and Freshman All-SEC.

By the latter half of the 2006 season, the Razorbacks' offense had become run-oriented, behind star running back Darren McFadden. In mid-December, Williams' parents, along with those of two other freshmen, met with Arkansas athletic director Frank Broyles to raise concerns that their sons might not be a good fit for the Razorbacks' system when they had been used to a pass oriented, spread offense under Malzahn's tenure at Springdale. Soon after the meeting, Williams asked for a release to transfer to another school and it was granted; by early January 2007, he decided to transfer to USC, entering in the spring semester. Malzahn soon left to join the coaching staff at Tulsa and Mustain later joined his teammate at USC.

=== Southern California ===
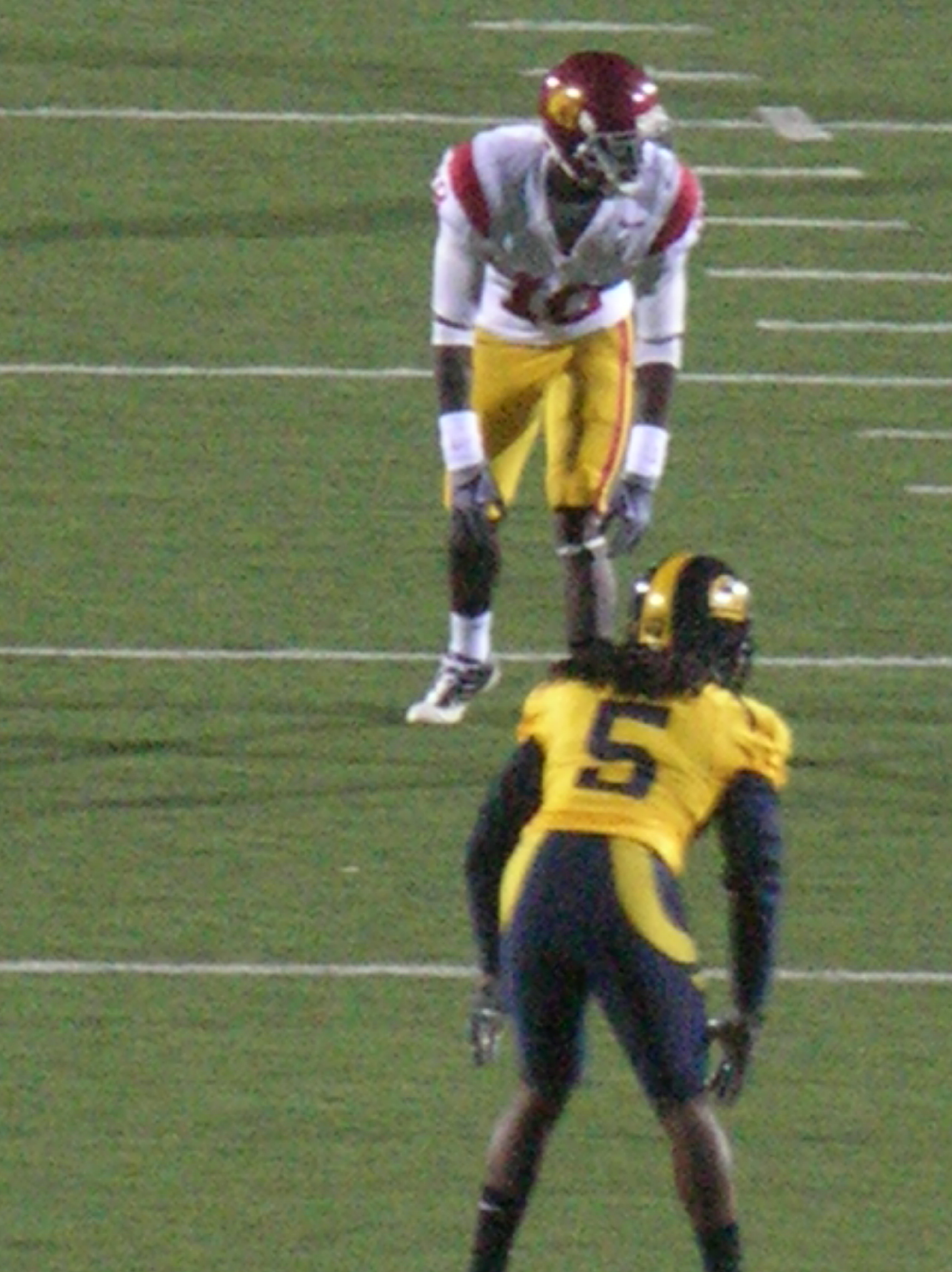
Williams (top) is covered by California cornerback Syd'Quan Thompson during an October 2009 game.

Due to NCAA transfer rules, Williams was required to sit out a season; however, Williams was permitted to play on the scout team and take a redshirt year. He tore a ligament in his shoulder during 2007 spring practice and sat out most of spring drills, then had post-spring surgery on both shoulders, limiting his practice time during the 2007 season.

During the 2008 spring practice, Williams impressed and quickly climbed to be a starting receiver for the Trojans going into the 2008 season. He developed into one of quarterback Mark Sanchez' primary receivers, catching 48 passes for 707 yards and eight touchdowns during the regular season. In the 2009 Rose Bowl, Williams made 10 receptions for 162 yards and a touchdown. Williams was First-team All-Pac 10 in 2009 as a Wide Receiver and Punt Returner.

== Professional career ==
=== Pre-draft ===
On December 23, 2009, several sources reported that Williams, who had already graduated from USC, would enter the 2010 NFL draft, forgoing his final year of college football eligibility.

=== Tennessee Titans ===
In the 2010 NFL Draft, Williams was selected with the 77th pick by the Tennessee Titans. On July 30, 2010, Williams signed a 4-year, $2.61 million deal.

Williams made his first career start against the Cleveland Browns on October 2, 2011, after the injury to Kenny Britt, who went down on September 25, 2011, tearing his ACL and MCL. Damian made his first career NFL touchdown catch against the Cleveland Browns on October 2, 2011 from a pass thrown by Matt Hasselbeck.

=== Miami Dolphins ===
On April 10, 2014, Williams signed a one-year contract with the Miami Dolphins. Williams was released just before the start of the 2014 season, but re-signed with the Dolphins on October 6. He was waived on October 26, in order to make room on the roster for the returning Dion Jordan.

=== St. Louis Rams ===
On October 29, 2014, the St. Louis Rams signed Williams. On August 31, 2015, the Rams released Williams.
