= Jeff Byers =

American football player (born 1985)

- Byers in 2026

No. 62
- Position: Center

Personal information
- Born: November 7, 1985 (age 41); Fremont, Nebraska, U.S.
- Listed height: 6 ft 3 in (1.91 m)
- Listed weight: 310 lb (141 kg)

Career information
- High school: Loveland (Loveland, Colorado)
- College: USC (2004–2009)
- NFL draft: 2010: undrafted

Career history
- Seattle Seahawks (2010)*; Denver Broncos (2010–2011); Carolina Panthers (2011–2013)
- * Offseason or practice squad member only

Awards and highlights
- Third-team All-American (2009); First-team All-Pac-10 (2009); Second-team All-Pac-10 (2008)

Career NFL statistics
- Games played: 22
- Games started: 7
- Stats at Pro Football Reference

Jeff Byers (born September 7, 1985) is an American entrepreneur and former professional American football player. He is the co-founder and CEO of Momentous, a nutrition and supplement company. Previously, Byers played as a center and guard in the National Football League (NFL). He played college football for the USC Trojans and was signed by the Seattle Seahawks as an undrafted free agent in 2010.

== Early life ==
Byers attended Loveland High School, where he participated in basketball, track and played competitive football. In 2003, he played both offense and defense: That season, on defense as a defensive lineman, he had 203 tackles, 56 tackles for loss, 10 sacks, 14 forced fumbles and 3 fumble recoveries (with a touchdown). On offense, as a center he recorded 34 pancake blocks in one game and never allowed a sack in his career. Loveland won the Class 4A state championship in 2003. He was named the 2004 Gatorade Player of the Year, as the nation's top high school football player.

== College career ==
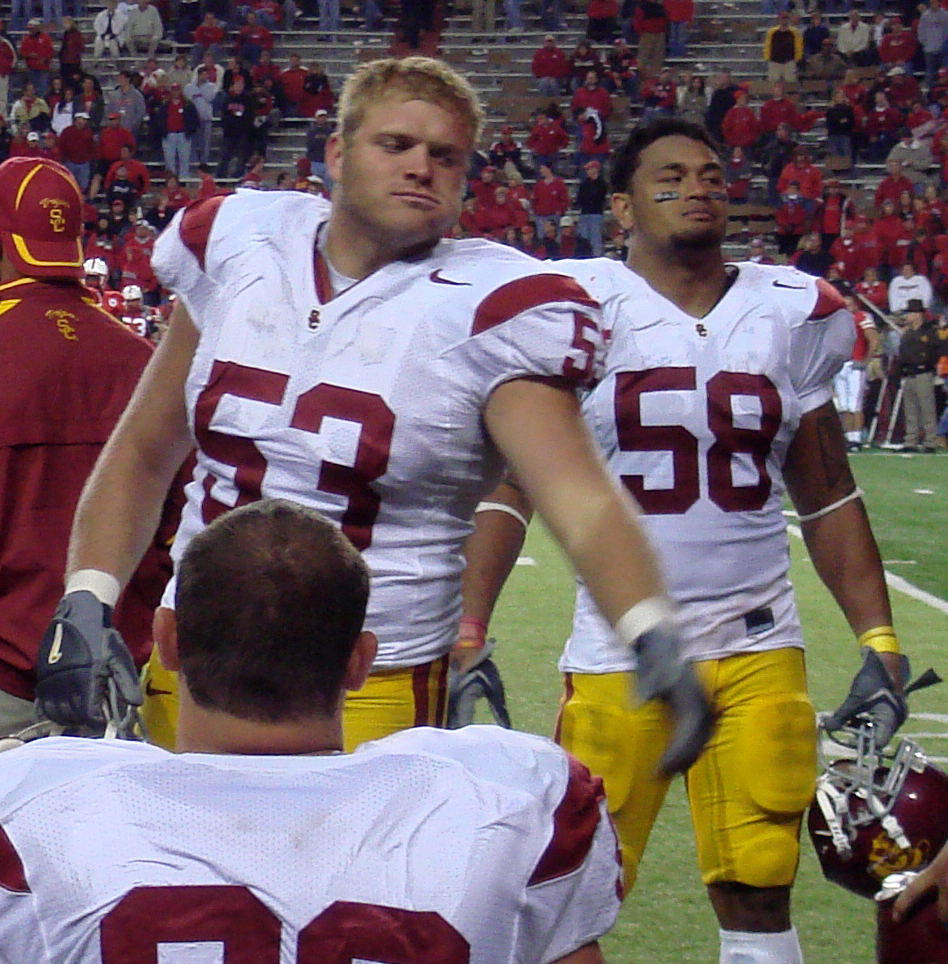
Byers and Rey Maualuga during their time at USC.

Although Byers arrived at USC as a center, the Trojans already had then-sophomore Ryan Kalil who kept the position for three seasons; as a result, he moved to left guard. As a freshman, Byers started 4 and played in all 13 games during the 2004 season, as the Trojans went on to win the National Championship.

In the spring before the 2005 season, Byers had hip surgery and missed the entire season under a medical redshirt. He started the 2006 season as a reserve in the opening game against Arkansas, but suffered a severe back injury in the preseason which ultimately required two surgeries, subsequently causing him to miss the remainder of the season.

In the summer of 2007, Byers received his bachelor's degree in business administration, completing his undergraduate program in just three years. Byers recovered in time for the 2007 season, where he started all 13 games: 12 starts at left offensive guard and as center against Washington State University, earning Pac-10 All-Academic Second Team honors.

Leading into the 2008 season, Byers missed most of the training camps the following spring after contracting Rocky Mountain spotted fever. He was able to recover and was selected as a team captain for the 2008 season. After starting all 12 regular season games, Byers was selected to the 2008 All-Pac-10 Second Team by conference coaches. During the 2008 season, USC head coach Pete Carroll had Byers lecture the entire team on the subprime mortgage crisis.

Due to the health issues that caused him to miss the 2005 and 2006 seasons, Byers petitioned the NCAA for a "clock-extension waiver". In December 2008, the NCAA granted him an additional season of eligibility.

In 2009, Byers was listed at No. 1 on Rivals.com's preseason interior lineman power ranking in 2009.

With the injury of starting center Kristofer O'Dowd, Byers was moved to starting center for the Trojans 2009 season opener against San Jose State. Byers started in all 13 games for the Trojans in his final collegiate season, helping the team to a 9-4 record, finishing 22nd in the AP Poll and a win over Boston College in the Emerald Bowl.

Following the 2009 season, Byers graduated from the Master of Business Administration program at the USC Marshall School of Business.

== Professional career ==
Pre-draft measurables
Height	Weight	Arm length	Hand span	Bench press
6 ft 3 in (1.91 m)	301 lb (137 kg)	33 1/8 in (0.84 m)	9 1/2 in (0.24 m)	33 reps
All values from NFL Combine

Undrafted in the 2010 NFL draft, Byers was signed by his former college coach, Pete Carroll, to the Seattle Seahawks on April 30, 2010, but cut before the start of the season. Byers was then added to the Denver Broncos practice squad on September 6, 2010. Byers was activated by the Broncos in December 2010, but released the following summer. Following his release by the Broncos, Byers was added to the Panthers' practice squad on September 5, 2011.

Byers appeared in 22 career regular season games for the Panthers between the 2012 and 2013 seasons, including seven starts.

He was promoted to the Panthers' active roster on December 17, 2011. Byers announced his retirement on March 11, 2014.

== Business career ==
Following his retirement from the NFL, Byers transitioned into the biotechnology and human performance sectors. In 2018, Byers co-founded Amp Human with Erica Good, a company focused on human performance products. He served as chief executive officer and oversaw the development and launch of PR Lotion, marketed for athletic performance and recovery. Under Byers' leadership, PR Lotion was adopted by athletes and teams in several professional sports leagues, including the NFL, NBA, and NHL. Amp Human also received research contracts from the United States Department of Defense related to human performance.

In 2021, Amp Human acquired nutrition supplement brand Momentous. Byers became co-founder and CEO of the combined company, which retained the Momentous name.

As CEO, Byers drew on his background as a professional athlete to direct the company’s focus toward a science-based approach to sports performance and longevity. He led the expansion of Momentous’s educational materials, originally developed for professional and collegiate athletic programs, to a broader consumer market. To oversee formulation and ingredient sourcing, Byers helped establish a Scientific Advisory Board that included researchers, physiologists, and clinicians such as Andrew Huberman, Kelly Starrett, Andy Galpin, and Stacy Sims to support product research and development, including formulation and ingredient sourcing. Under his leadership, Momentous became a supplier to more than 200 professional and collegiate sports programs and distributed the same product line directly to consumers.

Between 2021 and 2024, Byers led multiple funding rounds to expand the company's research pipeline and distribution footprint. In 2022, Momentous raised $6.5 million in a Series A round led by DSM Venturing, alongside athletic investors such as Luke Kuechly, Alex Honnold, and Jimmy Chin.

In February 2024, private equity firm Humble Growth, headlined by RXBAR and DAVID Protein founder Peter Rahal, Orgain founder and CEO Dr. Andrew Abraham, and Nick Giannuzzi, acquired a minority stake in Momentous for $32 million.

Under his leadership, Momentous introduced the Momentous Standard, an internal quality control protocol focused on third-party testing, ingredient bioavailability, and label verification, with most of its products certified by NSF Certified for Sport.

In 2025, Byers led the discontinuation of the company's ''Fadogia agrestis'' product after internal reviews raised efficacy concerns.

Under Byers, Momentous expanded beyond direct sales into retail, with products sold through The Vitamin Shoppe, Target, and regional retailers such as Scheels. As CEO, Byers expanded the company’s brand presence through high-profile partnerships and agreements across athletic organizations, including CrossFit and the CrossFit Games, USA Rugby and the New York Liberty, as well as brand ambassadors such as Arnold Schwarzenegger.
