= 2010 USC Trojans football team =

American college football season

2010 USC Trojans football
- Conference: Pacific-10 Conference
- Record: 8–5 (5–4 Pac-10)
- Head coach: Lane Kiffin (1st season)
- Offensive coordinator: Kennedy Pola (1st season)
- Offensive scheme: West Coast
- Defensive coordinator: Ed Orgeron (1st season)
- Base defense: 4–3
- Captains: Matt Barkley; Stanley Havili; Michael Morgan; Malcolm Smith; Shareece Wright
- Home stadium: Los Angeles Memorial Coliseum

2010 Pacific-10 Conference football standings
	Conf.			Overall
Team	W		L	W		L
No. 3 Oregon $	9	–	0	12	–	1
No. 4 Stanford %	8	–	1	12	–	1
USC †	5	–	4	8	–	5
Washington	5	–	4	7	–	6
Arizona	4	–	5	7	–	6
Arizona State	4	–	5	6	–	6
Oregon State	4	–	5	5	–	7
California	3	–	6	5	–	7
UCLA	2	–	7	4	–	8
Washington State	1	–	8	2	–	10
$ – BCS representative as conference champion; % – BCS at-large representative; † – USC ineligible for championship and post-season due to NCAA sanctions; Rankings from AP Poll

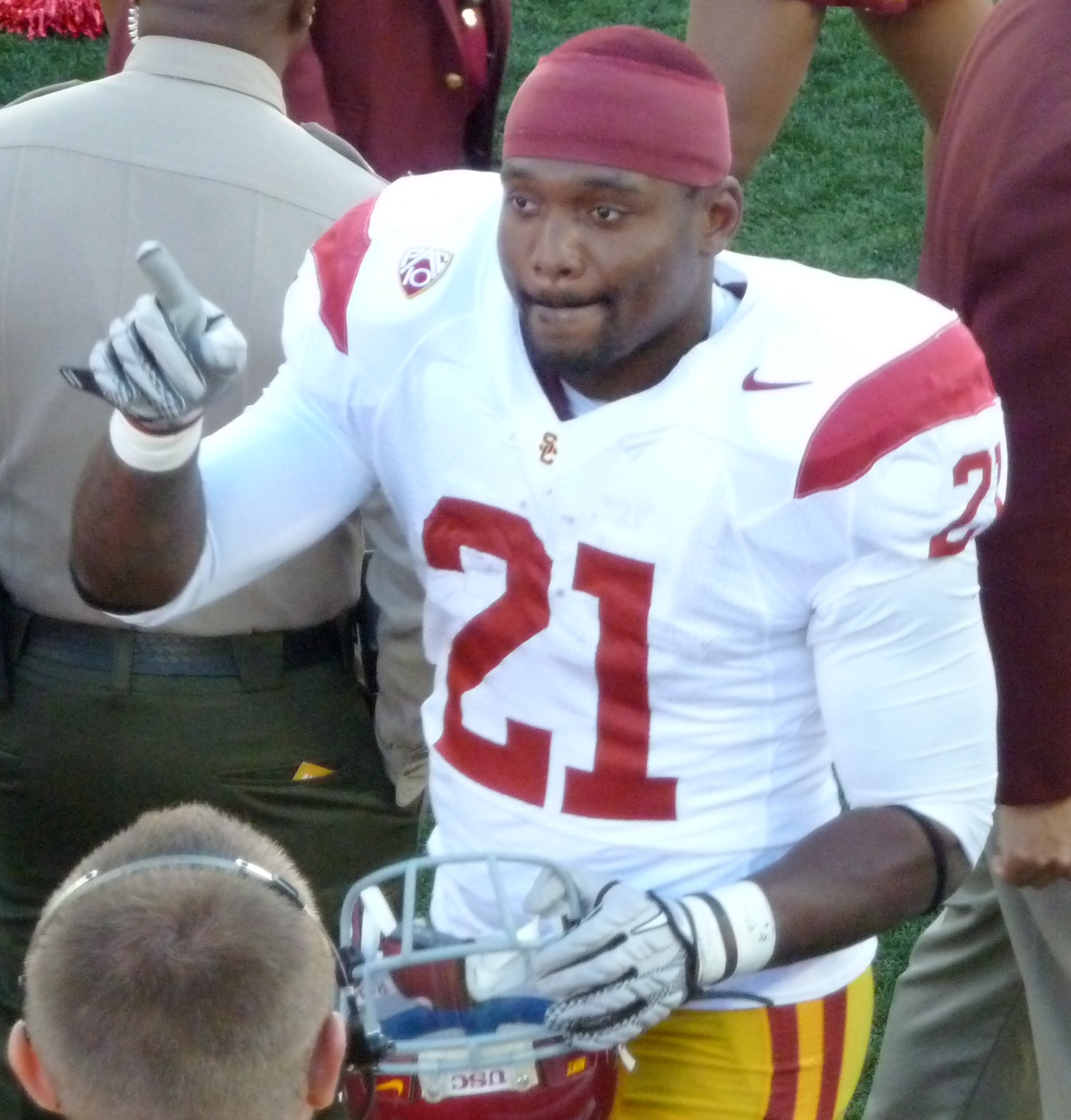
Running back Allen Bradford during a game in the 2010 USC Trojans football season.

The 2010 USC Trojans football team represented the University of Southern California in the 2010 NCAA Division I FBS college football season. The Trojans were led by head coach Lane Kiffin, who was in his 1st season. They played their home games at the Los Angeles Memorial Coliseum as members of the Pacific-10 Conference.

Despite finishing the season 8–5, the Trojans were ineligible for a bowl due to NCAA sanctions stemming from an investigation into multiple athletic teams across the university.

== Schedule ==
Date	Time	Opponent	Rank	Site	TV	Result	Attendance	Source
September 2	8:00 p.m.	at Hawaii*	No. 14	Aloha Stadium; Halawa, HI	ESPN	W 49–36	44,204	
September 11	7:30 p.m.	Virginia*	No. 16	Los Angeles Memorial Coliseum; Los Angeles, CA	FSN	W 17–14	81,375	
September 18	12:30 p.m.	at Minnesota*	No. 18	TCF Bank Stadium; Minneapolis, MN	ESPN	W 32–21	50,442	
September 25	12:00 p.m.	at Washington State	No. 20	Martin Stadium; Pullman, WA	FSN	W 50–16	24,310	
October 2	5:00 p.m.	Washington	No. 18	Los Angeles Memorial Coliseum; Los Angeles, CA	ESPN2	L 31–32	82,796	
October 9	5:00 p.m.	at No. 16 Stanford		Stanford Stadium; Stanford, CA (rivalry)	ABC	L 35–37	51,607	
October 16	12:30 p.m.	California		Los Angeles Memorial Coliseum; Los Angeles, CA	FSN	W 48–14	72,386	
October 30	5:00 p.m.	No. 1 Oregon^{†}	No. 24	Los Angeles Memorial Coliseum; Los Angeles, CA (College GameDay)	ABC/ESPN3	L 32–53	88,726	
November 6	7:30 p.m.	Arizona State		Los Angeles Memorial Coliseum; Los Angeles, CA	FSN	W 34–33	68,744	
November 13	5:00 p.m.	at No. 18 Arizona		Arizona Stadium; Tucson, AZ	ABC	W 24–21	54,722	
November 20	5:00 p.m.	at Oregon State	No. 20	Reser Stadium; Corvallis, OR	ABC	L 7–36	44,969	
November 27	5:00 p.m.	Notre Dame*		Los Angeles Memorial Coliseum; Los Angeles, CA (rivalry)	ABC	L 16–20	85,417	
December 4	7:30 p.m.	at UCLA		Rose Bowl; Pasadena, CA (Victory Bell)	FSN	W 28–14	71,105	
*Non-conference game; ^{†}Homecoming; Rankings from AP Poll released prior to the game; All times are in Pacific time

== Rankings ==
Ranking movement Legend: ██ Increase in ranking. ██ Decrease in ranking. ██ Not ranked the previous week.
Poll	Pre	Wk 1	Wk 2	Wk 3	Wk 4	Wk 5	Wk 6	Wk 7	Wk 8	Wk 9	Wk 10	Wk 11	Wk 12	Wk 13	Wk 14	Final
AP	14	16	18	20	18	NR	NR	NR	24	NR	NR	20	NR	NR	NR	NR
Coaches	Ineligible for ranking															
Harris	Not released						Ineligible for ranking									
BCS	Not released							Ineligible for ranking								

== Preseason ==
- July 1, 2010 – Running backs coach Todd McNair's contract expired June 30, 2010. He played a key part in the NCAA's investigation of the school's athletic department dealing with former Trojans running back Reggie Bush.
- July 6, 2010 – Seantrel Henderson, the nation's No. 1-ranked offensive tackle recruit was given a release from his commitment to play with USC. Following the release from his commitment, Henderson signed to play with the University of Miami (Fla.) Hurricanes football team. Defensive end Malik Jackson transferred to Tennessee.

== Game summaries ==
=== Hawaii ===
No. 14 USC Trojans vs Hawaii Warriors

Quarter	1	2	3	4	Total
No. 14 Trojans	14	13	15	7	49
Hawaii	3	13	7	13	36

at Aloha Stadium, Honolulu, HI

- Date: September 2nd, 2010
- Game time: 8:00 p.m. PST
- Game weather: 83 Degrees
- Game attendance: 44,204
- TV: ESPN

Game information

First quarter

- USC - David Ausberry 46 yard pass from Matt Barkley for a TD (2-point pass failed), 10:07 - USC 6-0
- HAW - Scott Enos kicks a 24-yard field goal, 6:33 - USC 6-3
- USC - Ronald Johnson 1 yard pass from Matt Barkley for a TD (Ronald Johnson 2-point pass), 1:38 - USC 14-3

Second quarter

- USC - Rhett Ellison 6 yard pass from Matt Barkley (2-point pass failed), 12:19 - USC 20-3
- HAW - Scott Enos kicks a 40 yard field goal, 7:27 - USC 20-6
- HAW - Kealoha Pilares 56 yard pass from Bryant Moniz (Scott Enos kick), 2:57 - USC 20-13
- USC - Ronald Johnson 13 yard pass from Matt Barkley (Joe Houston kick), 1:06 - USC 27-13
- HAW - Scott Enos kicks a 18 yard field goal, 0:03 - USC 27-16

Third quarter

- USC - Ronald Johnson returns a punt for a 89 yard TD (Joe Houston kick), 7:17 - USC 34-16
- HAW - Alex Green runs for a 1 yard TD (Scott Enos kick), 1:54 - USC 34-23
- USC - Ronald Johnson 3 yard pass from Matt Barkley (Mitch Mustain 2-point rush), 0:27 - USC 42-23

Fourth quarter

- HAW - Kealoha Pilares 65 yard pass from Shane Austin (Scott Enos kick), 6:48 - USC 42-30
- USC - Marc Tyler runs for a 44 yard TD (Joe Houston kick), 6:35 - USC 49-30
- HAW - Kealoha Pilares 30 yard pass from Shane Austin (2-point pass failed), 3:52 - USC 49-36

Passing

- USC - Matt Barkley 18-23, 257 yards, 5TDs
- Hawaii - Bryant Monlz 18-36, 269 yards, 1TD

Rushing

- USC - Marc Tyler 17 carries, 154 yards, 1TD
- Hawaii - Alex Green 9 carries, 66 yards, 1TD

Receiving

- USC - Ronald Johnson 7 receptions, 59 yards, 3TDs
- Hawaii - Kealoha Pilares 5 receptions, 176 yards, 3TDs

Statistics	No. 14 USC	Hawaii
First downs	25	31
Plays–yards	62-524	78-588
Rushes–yards	35-246	29-129
Passing yards	278	459
Passing: comp–att–int	20-27-0	27-49-0
Turnovers		
Time of possession	27:53	32:07

The Trojans began the season by taking advantage of the NCCA's Hawaii scheduling exemption which permits an extra non-conference game when traveling to Hawaii, which allowed them a 13-game schedule without a bowl game. The game turned out to be an offensive showcase, with Matt Barkley throwing a USC record-tying five touchdowns.

=== Virginia ===
	1	2	3	4	Total
Cavaliers	0	7	0	7	14
#16 Trojans	0	14	0	3	17

In their home debut the Trojans hosted the Virginia Cavaliers, who played their first game ever in the state of California. Compared with the previous match's high-scoring, the game remained close with the Cavaliers failing by only three points.

=== Minnesota ===
	1	2	3	4	Total
#18 Trojans	7	6	6	13	32
Golden Gophers	7	0	7	7	21

USC extended its victory streak against Big Ten schools to 11 games in a road win against the embattled Golden Gophers, who lost their previous game to FCS foe South Dakota. Minnesota went on to fire its head coach Tim Brewster later in the season. The game was also the 19th straight nonconference win by the Trojans, a streak that would be broken later in the season by Notre Dame.

=== Washington State ===
	1	2	3	4	Total
#20 Trojans	21	7	15	7	50
Cougars	7	6	0	3	16

Southern California began their conference schedule after dropping six spots in the AP rankings since the preseason poll despite going undefeated. Washington State scored on their opening drive, but the Trojans went on to score 50 points in a blowout, earning Lane Kiffin a 4-0 record, the best start of a USC coach's tenure since Jess Hill in 1951.

=== Washington ===
	1	2	3	4	Total
Huskies	3	17	3	9	32
#18 Trojans	7	14	7	3	31

For consecutive years, head coach Steve Sarkisian's Washington Huskies upset the Trojans by kicking a last-second field goal. Sarkisian was an assistant coach at USC prior to taking over the program at Washington.

Erik Folk, who hit the game-winning field goal for Washington, was named Pac-10 special teams player of the week. He went 4-for-4 on field goals and completed two PAT attempts. The previous year, Folk kicked a 22-yarder to defeat the Trojans 16-13.

=== Stanford ===
	1	2	3	4	Total
Trojans	7	7	7	14	35
#16 Cardinal	7	7	7	16	37

For the second week in a row USC lost in the final seconds of the game by a field goal, as Stanford kicker Nate Whitaker made a 30-yarder as time expired. It marked the first time since 2000 that Stanford defeated the Trojans at Stanford Stadium, and the first time since 2001 that USC has lost two games in a row.

=== California ===
	1	2	3	4	Total
Golden Bears	0	0	7	7	14
Trojans	14	28	3	3	48

Matt Barkley once again tied the USC mark for touchdown passes in a game by throwing five to put the Trojans up 42-0 at halftime. USC rested its starters in the second half, allowing 14 points, but still prevailed by 34 points.

=== Oregon ===
	1	2	3	4	Total
#1 Ducks	8	21	14	10	53
#24 Trojans	10	7	15	0	32

The Ducks came into the game ranked 1st in the AP poll. The previous three weeks a team ranked number one had lost, but the Trojans were unable to continue this streak. USC had a three-point lead in the third quarter, but Oregon scored all the game's remaining points and won by margin of three touchdowns.

=== Arizona State ===
	1	2	3	4	Total
Sun Devils	7	0	14	12	33
Trojans	0	14	15	5	34

The Trojans eked out a single-point victory against Arizona State thanks to a rare defensive two-point conversion in the fourth quarter. After the Sun Devils scored a touchdown to put them in the lead by four points Torin Harris blocked the extra point and ran it back to the opposite end-zone, cutting ASU's newly found lead to two. Kicker Joe Houston later kicked a 29-yard field to put the Trojans in the lead, which they maintained during the game's final minutes.

=== Arizona ===
	1	2	3	4	Total
Trojans	14	7	3	0	24
#18 Wildcats	0	14	0	7	21

USC beat Arizona to extend its win streak in Tucson to nine with a 160-yard performance by Marc Tyler and avenged their season-ending loss from the previous year.

=== Oregon State ===
	1	2	3	4	Total
#20 Trojans	0	0	7	0	7
Beavers	3	17	3	13	36

The Trojans lost their third straight game in Corvallis and lost Matt Barkley to injury late in the second quarter. Oregon State's 36–7 victory marked the worst defeat for USC against the Beavers in 96 years.

=== Notre Dame ===
	1	2	3	4	Total
Fighting Irish	0	13	0	7	20
Trojans	3	0	10	3	16

Playing with its backup quarterback Mitch Mustain, USC lost to Notre Dame and ended its victory streak against its arch rival dating back to 2001. The Fighting Irish scored the go-ahead touchdown with 2:23 remaining in the game, and the Trojans failed to convert a two-minute drill after a pass to Ronald Johnson that would have resulted in a touchdown and the probable win was dropped. Mustain later threw an interception that ended the game and gave Notre Dame the victory.

=== UCLA ===
	1	2	3	4	Total
Trojans	7	7	0	14	28
Bruins	7	0	0	7	14

After losing to rival Notre Dame the week before, USC bounced back to close their season with a win over cross-town rival UCLA to retain the Victory Bell. Quarterback Matt Barkley returned after missing the previous week and threw one of the team's two touchdown passes. Allen Bradford led the Trojans by gaining 212 yards rushing and catching a 47-yard touchdown throw to extend the victory streak against the Bruins to four.
