= Stafon Johnson =

American football player (born 1988)

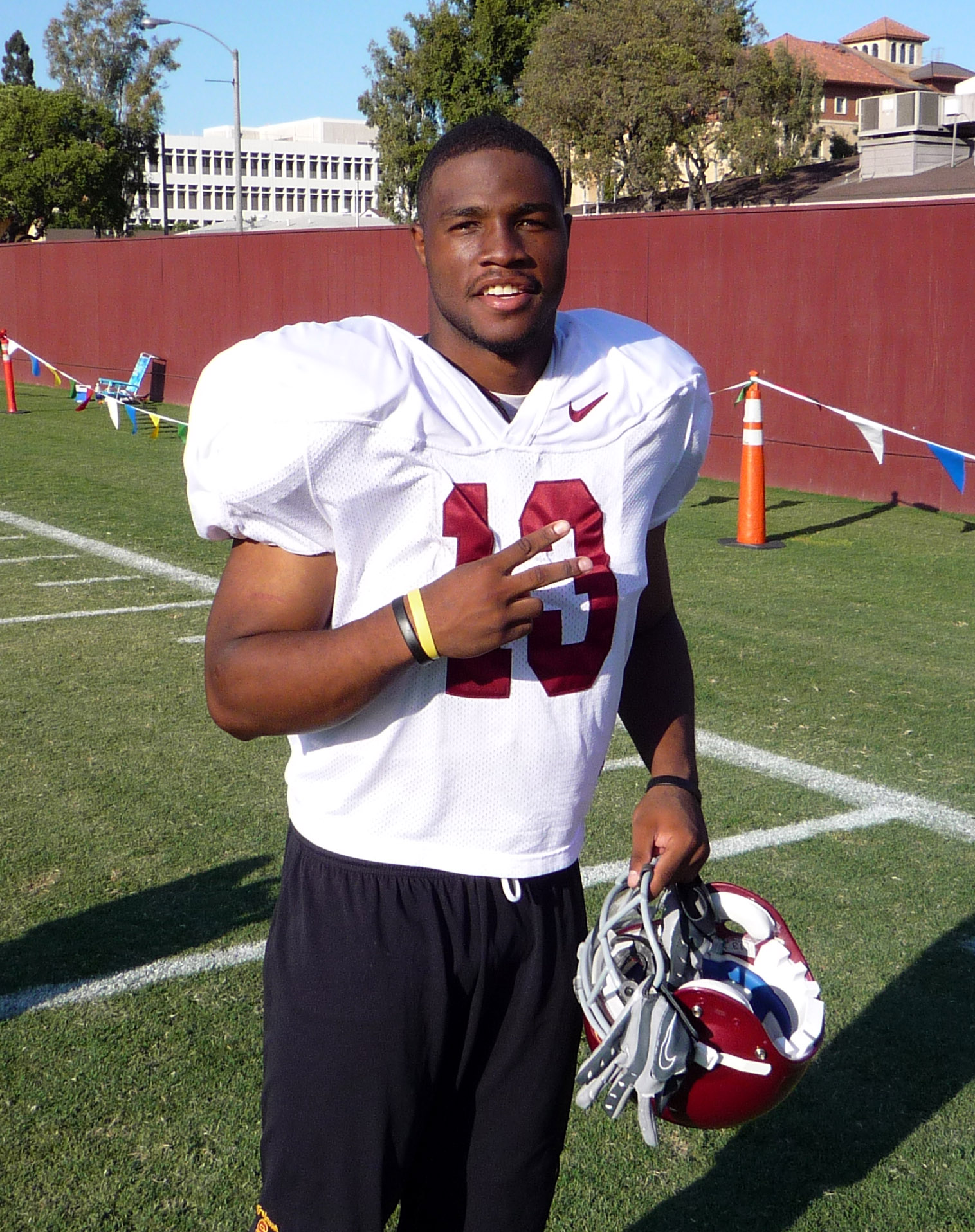
- Johnson after a 2008 fall practice

No. 13
- Position: Running back

Personal information
- Born: February 6, 1988 (age 38); Compton, California, U.S.
- Listed height: 5 ft 11 in (1.80 m)
- Listed weight: 222 lb (101 kg)

Career information
- High school: Los Angeles (CA) Dorsey
- College: USC
- NFL draft: 2010: undrafted

Career history
- Tennessee Titans (2010); Washington Redskins (2011)*
- * Offseason or practice squad member only
- Stats at Pro Football Reference

Stafon Johnson (born February 6, 1988) is an American former professional football player who was a running back in the National Football League (NFL). He played college football for the USC Trojans and was signed by the Tennessee Titans as an undrafted free agent in 2010. He was also a member of the Washington Redskins.

== Early life ==
Johnson played high school football at Susan Miller Dorsey High School in Los Angeles, California. He played running back and defensive back. Going into his junior season, he was regarded as one of the top three running backs in his region. His best season came as a senior in 2005 when he rushed for 2,197 yards on 247 carries with 22 touchdowns. He finished his high school career with a city record 5,777 rushing yards and 58 touchdowns.

A highly regarded recruit, Johnson was the No. 18 overall prospect in the country and the No. 2 running back by Rivals.com. He received offers from Florida, Miami, UCLA and paid serious attention to Georgia and Washington. He ultimately chose USC, noting that he liked the coaches and its proximity to his parents.

== College career ==
During his freshman season, Johnson played in three games, rushing for 17 yards on three carries.

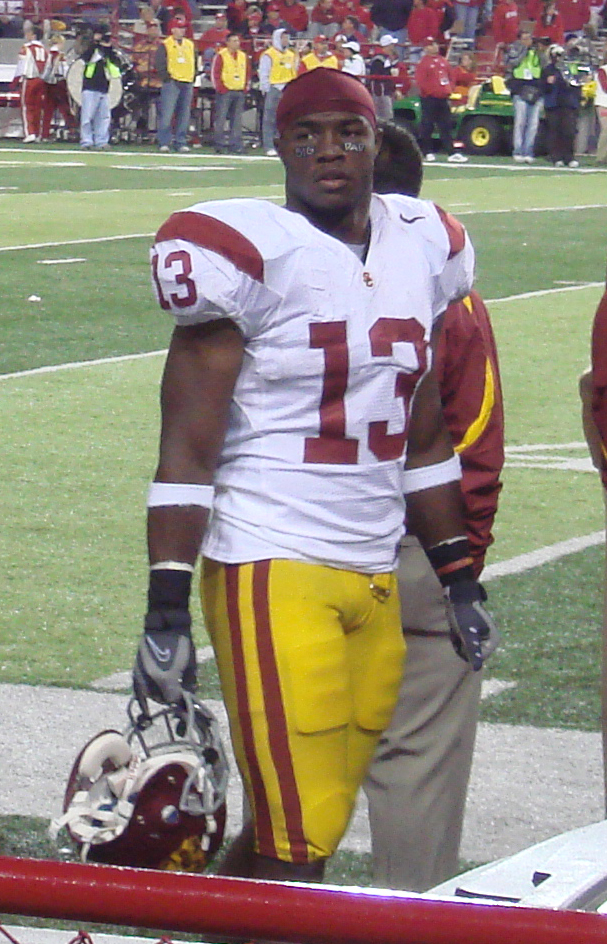
Johnson after his 2007 performance against Nebraska, where he rushed for 144 yards on 11 carries with one touchdown.

Johnson had a breakthrough in the 2007 season, finishing with 673 rushing yards and five touchdowns. He ran for 122 yards and a touchdown in 14 carries against Washington before suffering a foot injury. The injury, which was first diagnosed a game earlier as a left foot bruise, included a sprain that kept him out of practices and limited his playing time for the rest of the season. He returned at the end of the season, rushing for 104 yards in the Rose Bowl.

As a junior in 2008, Johnson led the Trojans in rushing yards with 705 yards on 138 carries and nine touchdowns. He had 305 yards on 42 punt returns.

=== Barbell accident ===
On September 28, 2009, Johnson suffered an injury when the 275 pounds (125 kg) barbell he was lifting fell on his throat while performing a bench press during a routine team workout. Bleeding from his mouth and nose, he was rushed to California Hospital Medical Center and had three emergency surgeries to repair damage to his crushed vocal cord, adam's apple and torn muscles. Doctors partially credited his survival to well developed muscles around his neck, which helped him keep open a breathing passage, as well as his level of fitness. He was moved to Cedars-Sinai Medical Center, and was released on October 15, 2009, though he was still unable to speak and had a breathing tube in his throat. The injury ended his 2009 season, during which he had run for a team-high five touchdowns in the Trojans' first four games. As a fourth-year senior, Johnson was eligible to enter the NFL or apply to the NCAA for an extra year of eligibility because of a medical hardship.

Later in the 2009 season, the USC football team honored Johnson by wearing helmet stickers that read "STA FIGHT ON" while playing rival Notre Dame.

On January 24, 2011, Johnson sued USC and the former assistant conditioning coach who was present for negligence related to the accident.

== Professional career ==
Pre-draft measurables
Height	Weight	Arm length	Hand span	40-yard dash	10-yard split	20-yard split	20-yard shuttle	Three-cone drill	Vertical jump	Broad jump	Bench press
5 ft 10 7/8 in (1.80 m)	214 lb (97 kg)	30 3/8 in (0.77 m)	8 3/4 in (0.22 m)	4.61 s	1.62 s	2.66 s	4.28 s	7.21 s	35.5 in (0.90 m)	9 ft 10 in (3.00 m)	14 reps
All values from NFL Combine/Pro Day

After going undrafted in the 2010 NFL draft, Johnson signed a contract immediately after the draft with the Tennessee Titans.

In his rookie season, Stafon Johnson was injured in a preseason game against the Seattle Seahawks on August 15, 2010. His ankle was severely dislocated by an opposing tackler accidentally landing on Johnson's planted right leg. He was estimated to be out for at least 8–12 weeks. He cleared waivers and was placed on IR. He was released on September 2, 2011.

Johnson was signed to the Washington Redskins practice squad on December 28, 2011.

== Personal ==
Johnson was raised by his mother, Kim Mallory. He had a close relationship with his grandfather, Larry "Big Dad" Mallory, a father figure who attended practices and games. Larry Mallory died from a heart attack at age 66. During games his sophomore season, Johnson wrote "Big Dad" on his eye blacks.

Johnson enjoys music and bowling. He prays before every game. He has two sons Stafon Johnson Jr, Aiden Johnson

Late in 2019 he was hired as Head Football coach at his alma mater, Dorsey HS.
