= Mitch Clark =

Mitch Clark may refer to

- Mitch Clark (Australian footballer) (born 1987), retired Australian rules football player
- Mitch Clark (footballer, born 1999), Welsh footballer.
- Mitch Clark (rugby league) (born 1993), New Zealand rugby league footballer for Castleford Tigers

== See also ==
- Mitch Clarke, Canadian wrestler
- Mitch Clarke (basketball), Australian basketball player
- Mitchell Clarke, Barbadian cricketer
