= Mitch Singer =

American lawyer & digital media executive (born 1955)

Mitch Singer (born June 3, 1955) is a lawyer and digital media executive who has taken a leading role in establishing secure delivery systems for premium content.

== Sony ==
Singer joined Sony Pictures Entertainment in 1990 as Counsel in the Litigation Group. In 1991, he became Counsel to the Television Legal Group, and was promoted to Senior Counsel in 1992. He was named Assistant General Counsel in 1994 and became Vice President in the Television Legal Group in 1996. That same year, he was named head of Columbia TriStar Home Entertainment Legal Affairs. In 1997, Mr. Singer became Senior Vice President and transferred to the Intellectual Property Department for SPE. In this capacity he was responsible for traditional intellectual property issues such as copyright and trademark, new technology licensing and content protection.

Singer was Chief Digital Strategy Officer, Sony Pictures Entertainment. At Sony Pictures, Singer collaborated with the studio’s various business units on strategies to address the ongoing digital transformation of the entertainment industry – helping to identify digital business opportunities, exploring new products, formats, and services, representing SPE in industry forums, and working to mitigate digital theft. He focused on emerging and disruptive technologies and evaluates and develops adaptive business models to stay ahead of the technological curve. In addition to developing new consumer usage models, Singer played a central role in Sony Pictures’ worldwide anti-digital theft and digital rights management efforts. Singer was the lead negotiator for Sony Pictures in content protection technology licensing issues.

Singer was laid off by Sony in January 2014.

== Other posts ==
Singer also serves as President of Digital Entertainment Content Ecosystem, the 75-member, cross-industry consortium behind UltraViolet, the effort to create open standards for digital entertainment distribution enabling consumers to acquire and play content across a wide range of services and devices. Singer sits on the boards of Motion Picture Laboratories, DVD CCA, Entertainment Technology Center USC, the HDBaseT Alliance as well as the HQME (“High Quality Mobile Experience” Steering Committee He also was appointed to the copyright committee for The National Academies’ Board on Science, Technology, and Economic Policy.

== Honors ==
The Hollywood Reporter’s 2012 Digital Power 50

2012 Inductee into Variety’s Home Entertainment Hall of Fame

2012 Home Media Magazine 2nd Annual Digital Drivers Issue

The Daily Variety’s Dealmakers Impact Report 2011: Executives

2011 Home Media Magazine Digital Drivers Issue

== Education ==
Mr. Singer received both his JD and MBA from the University of San Diego.
