= Marc Tyler =

American football player (born 1988)

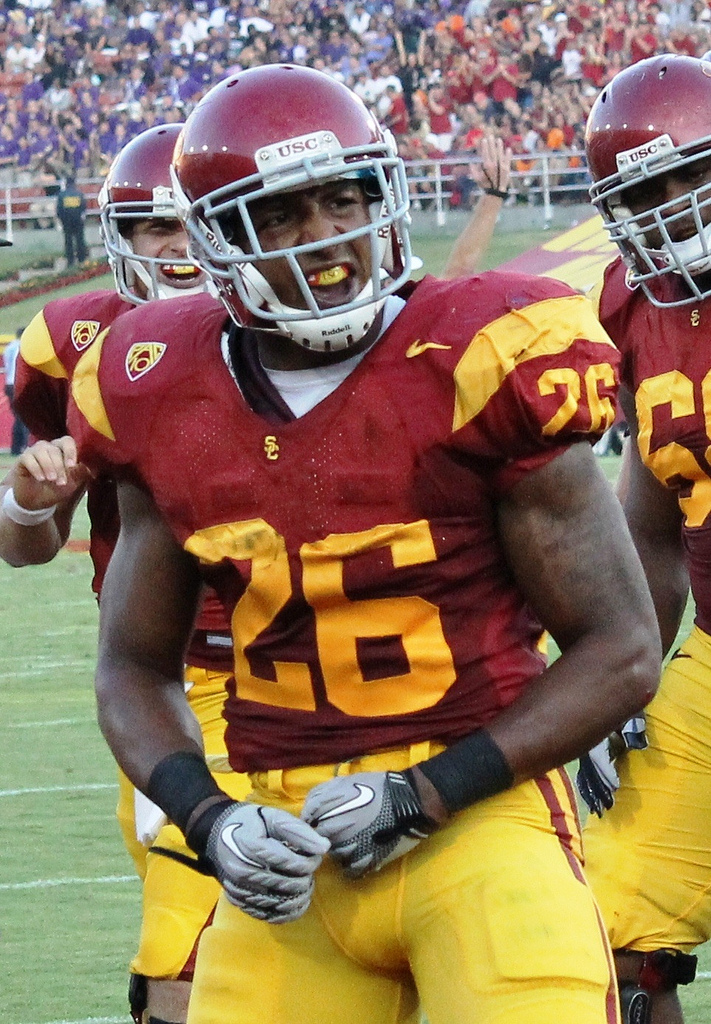
- Tyler with USC in 2010

No. 26
- Position: Running back

Personal information
- Born: September 27, 1988 (age 38); Los Angeles, California, U.S.
- Listed height: 5 ft 11 in (1.80 m)
- Listed weight: 226 lb (103 kg)

Career information
- High school: Oaks Christian School (Westlake Village, California)
- College: USC
- NFL draft: 2012: undrafted

Career history
- Green Bay Packers (2012)*
- * Offseason or practice squad member only

Marc Anthony Tyler (born September 27, 1988) is an American former football running back. He played college football at Southern California. Tyler was signed by the Green Bay Packers as an undrafted free agent in 2012.

== Early life ==
Tyler attended Oaks Christian High School in Westlake Village, California, while his family lived in Palmdale. He stayed with the family of a teammate. In his senior season, Tyler scored 31 touchdowns and averaged 12.2 yards per carry. Tyler broke his left leg during a playoff game in November 2006; as a result, he had a stainless steel rod surgically implanted in his leg.

Despite the injury, Tyler remained a 5-star recruit and was ranked as the 2nd best running back prospect in the U.S. behind fellow USC recruit Joe McKnight, and the 17th best overall. At Oaks Christian High School, Tyler played alongside quarterback Jimmy Clausen, the nation's #1 rated recruit overall.

== College career ==
Tyler enrolled at University of Southern California in August 2007. After redshirting the 2007 season while recovering from a broken leg that he suffered in his senior season at Oaks Christian HS, he was expected to play in 2008. In the season opener at Virginia, Tyler scored the first touchdown of his collegiate career with 02:33 minutes remaining in the fourth quarter.

== Professional career ==
After going undrafted in the 2012 NFL draft, Tyler signed with the Green Bay Packers on May 11, 2012. He was released during final cuts on August 31 but was signed to the practice squad a few days later. Tyler was released from the Packers' practice squad on September 12, 2012.

== Awards and honors ==
- 2006 USA Today All-American
- 2006 Parade All-American

== Personal ==
Marc Tyler's father, Wendell Tyler, was a running back at UCLA (1973–76), who led the Bruins in rushing in 1975, and later became a Pro Bowl running back for the Los Angeles Rams and San Francisco 49ers of the NFL.
