= Mitch Mustain =

American gridiron football player (born 1988)

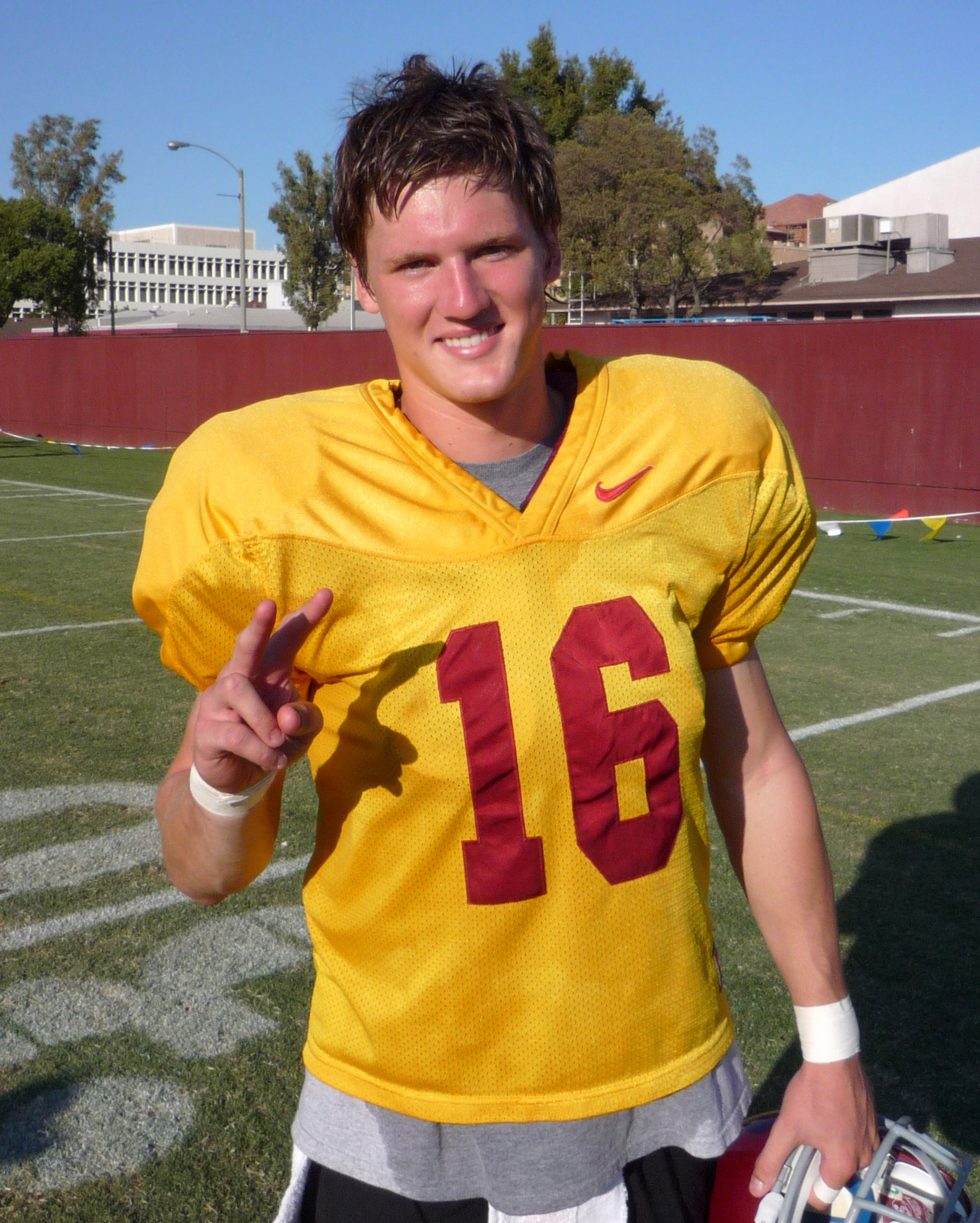
- Mustain with the USC Trojans in 2008

No. 10
- Position: Quarterback

Personal information
- Born: February 27, 1988 (age 38); Fayetteville, Arkansas, U.S.
- Listed height: 6 ft 2 in (1.88 m)
- Listed weight: 200 lb (91 kg)

Career information
- High school: Springdale (AR)
- College: Arkansas (2006); USC (2007–2010)
- NFL draft: 2011: undrafted

Career history
- Hamilton Tiger-Cats (2011)*; Georgia Force (2012)*; San Jose SaberCats (2013); San Antonio Talons (2014)
- * Offseason or practice squad member only

Career AFL statistics
- Comp. / Att.: 99 /192
- Passing yards: 1,170
- TD–INT: 18–8
- Passer rating: 76.52
- Rushing touchdowns: 2
- Stats at ArenaFan.com

Mitchell Stewart Mustain (born February 27, 1988) is an American former football player. He played high school football and baseball at Springdale High School in Springdale, Arkansas. Mustain played his first year of college football at the University of Arkansas in 2006 before transferring to the University of Southern California (USC) in 2007. Under NCAA transfer rules, he sat out the 2007 season and started playing for USC in the 2008 season. Mustain graduated from USC in 2010, and proceeded to have a professional football career in the AFL. He did not play baseball in college, opting instead to pursue a football career. Despite this, Mustain would briefly play in Minor League Baseball in 2012.

== Early life ==
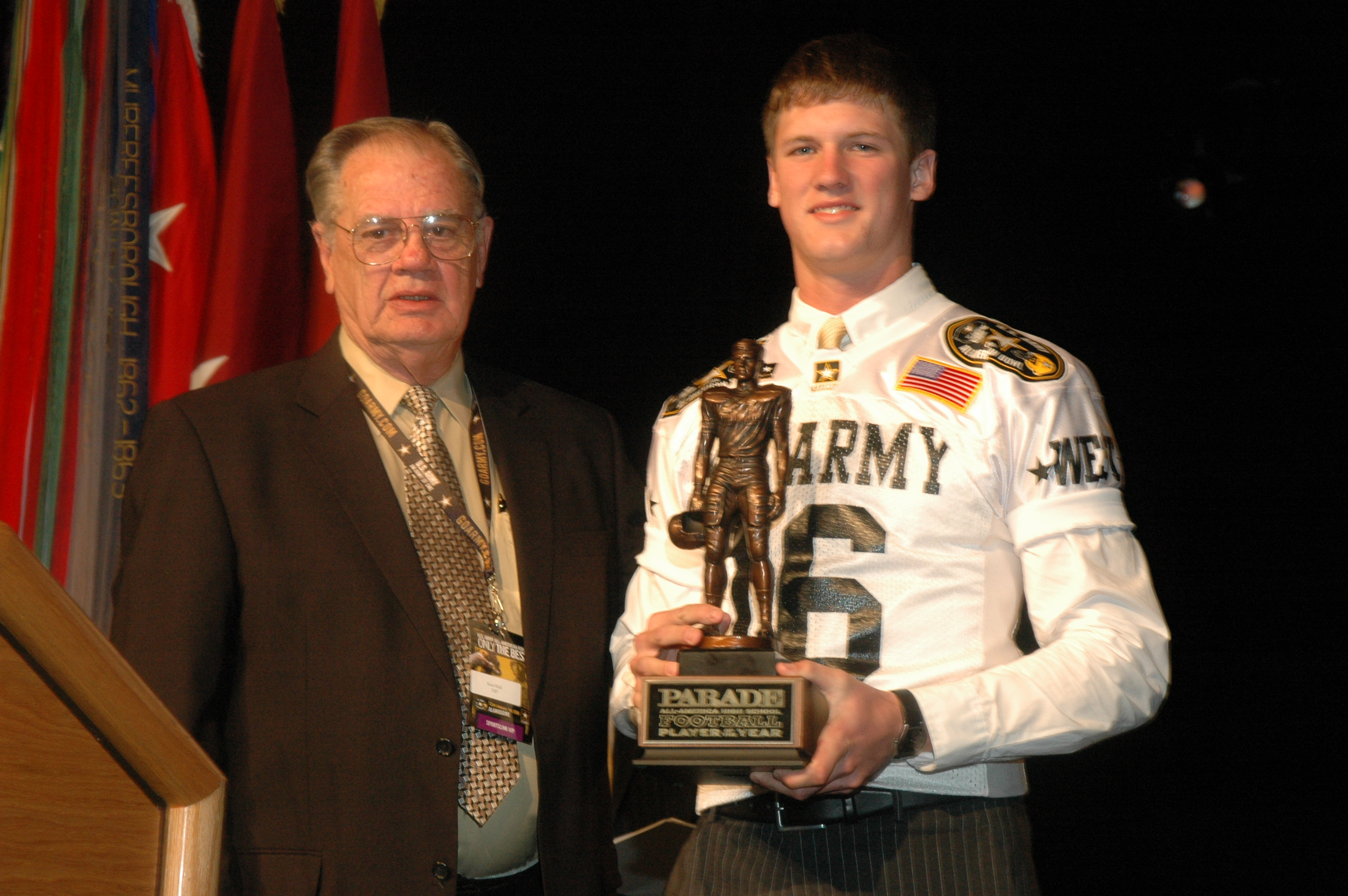
Mustain receiving the annual Hall Trophy from high school football legend Kenneth Hall.

By the time he left Southwest Junior High School, Mustain was already the object of high expectations; however he did not start for the Springdale High School varsity team until the first game of his junior season.

In 2004 as a junior, Mustain was 139-of-222 for 2,169 yards and 20 touchdowns as Springdale posted a 12–1 record and reached the Class AAAAA semifinals. He threw only five interceptions in 222 attempts and rushed for 350 yards and 14 touchdowns.

In 2005 as a senior, Mustain threw for 3,817 yards and set the state's highest classification single season record with 47 touchdowns and completed 69.3 percent of his pass attempts. Springdale went undefeated with a record of 14–0 and won the Class AAAAA state title, including three wins over nationally ranked opponents and a No. 2 ranking in one national poll.

He was named Mr. Football in Arkansas by the Arkansas Democrat-Gazette. Mustain started at quarterback for the West team in the 2006 edition of U.S. Army All-American Bowl in San Antonio, Texas, where he was awarded the Hall Trophy as National High School Player of the Year. He similarly swept the other major 'national player of the year' awards (Gatorade, USA Today, PARADE) for the season. Scout.com ranked him as the top high school recruit for the class of 2006. Mustain had told reporters he planned to play for either Notre Dame, Tennessee, Alabama, or his home-state Arkansas Razorbacks.

Mustain was the top quarterback in the nation coming out of high school in 2006, and was considered a better prospect than eventual Heisman Trophy–winner Tim Tebow. In recognition of his accomplishments, Springdale Mayor Jerre Van Hoose declared December 6, 2005 "Mitch Mustain Day" in the city.

In December 2005, Gus Malzahn, Mustain's coach at Springdale, was hired to be the new offensive coordinator at the University of Arkansas; this was widely taken to signal the Razorbacks willingness to shift their offense to adapt to Mustain's style of play. The hiring enabled the Razorbacks to recruit the highly touted quarterback. On January 16, 2006, Mustain informed Malzahn of his decision to commit to Arkansas, but only after Notre Dame Coach Charlie Weis opted to offer quarterback recruit Jimmy Clausen a scholarship over Mustain. In addition to Malzahn, Mustain joined six of his high school teammates at Arkansas.

== College career ==
=== University of Arkansas (2006) ===
==== True freshman starter ====
Mustain enrolled at the University of Arkansas on July 10, 2006, and, in his first game on September 2, 2006, replaced starting quarterback Robert Johnson in the fourth quarter of an eventual 50–14 loss to the USC Trojans. He immediately put together an 80-yard touchdown drive against the Trojan defense. The following day, Arkansas head coach Houston Nutt named Mustain as the starting quarterback for the next game against Utah State, moving Johnson to wide receiver.

Mustain accumulated a record of 8–0 as a true freshman starter, including a 27–10 win on the road over the #2 ranked Auburn Tigers on October 7, 2006, helping guide the Razorbacks to 11th in the college football rankings. The offense was oriented around what was considered among the nation's best running back tandems, Darren McFadden (who would be the runner-up for the Heisman Trophy), Peyton Hillis, and Felix Jones; as a result, Mustain's statistics did not match his high school numbers in a more pass-oriented offense.

==== Change in status ====
A turning point occurred on November 4, 2006, in No. 11 Arkansas' 26–20 win over South Carolina, when Mustain was relieved after one series by sophomore Casey Dick, who led the Razorbacks for 228 yards and a touchdown. The day after the game, Dick was named the starting quarterback for an upcoming game against #13 Tennessee, with Nutt citing "experience" as the primary reason for the change.

Mustain did not play in the next three games and entered for one series in the SEC Championship game on Dec 2 against the eventual national champion Florida Gators.

On Dec 20, Nutt announced that Dick would start for the Razorbacks in the Jan 1 Capital One Bowl against the Wisconsin Badgers; however, he stated that Mustain would also enter the game in the third series. The Badgers beat Arkansas, 17–14.

Mustain finished the season with 894 yards passing, completing 69 out of 132 passes with 10 touchdowns and nine interceptions.

==== Transfer from Arkansas ====
On January 15, 2007, Malzahn announced he was leaving the Razorbacks to join the University of Tulsa. The day after Malzahn's announcement, Mustain requested permission to transfer to another university. It was eventually granted by Nutt. The announcement was one year to the day after Mustain had initially announced his decision to sign with the Razorbacks out of high school. Nutt had initially refused Mustain's request to transfer out. After the initial denial, Mustain went to two Arkansas boosters for guidance, and they and his mother, Beck Campbell, met with Nutt and Athletic Director Frank Broyles to secure the transfer.

=== University of Southern California (2007–2010) ===
Mustain enrolled at the University of Southern California (USC) on May 21, 2007. He joined his former Springdale High School and Arkansas teammate, Damian Williams, who had transferred to USC the previous January. Mustain found the West Coast offense run at USC to be appealing; it differed from the spread offense run by Malzahn and appealed to his quarterback playing style.

Under NCAA transfer rules, Mustain sat out the 2007 season and served as the quarterback for the scout team. On December 19, 2007, he was rewarded with the Service Team Player of the Year (offense) award at the Trojan football team's annual awards banquet.

Mustain became eligible to play again for the 2008 season, with three years of eligibility remaining. During fall camp before the 2008 season, starter Mark Sanchez suffered a dislocated left kneecap while warming up for practice; the injury sidelined Sanchez and threw his availability for the season opener at Virginia (and beyond) into question. As a result, Mustain and redshirt freshman Aaron Corp began alternating repetitions with the first team offense and competing for the possible starting spot. After missing nearly three weeks, Sanchez was cleared to play in the opener on the final day of fall camp; Corp was selected as his back-up because he demonstrated a better command of the offense, however, head coach Pete Carroll stated the competition for the back-up spot would continue through the season. The competition resulted in Mustain regaining the second spot for some games and Corp for others throughout the season.

At the end of the 2008 season, Sanchez opted to forgo his final season and enter the NFL draft, leaving the competition for the starting position in the 2009 season open between Mustain, Corp, and in-coming true freshman Matt Barkley, who like the other two also received major accolades as a high school player. By the end of spring practices, Mustain was placed third in the order behind Corp and Barkley.

Despite being relegated to third-string, Mustain stayed on the team and even tried out at the punter position to try to contribute. Better results in practice, an injury to Barkley and a poor performance by Corp helped Mustain to become Barkley's backup.

After the 2009 season, Corp transferred to Richmond, and after off-season practices, Mustain became Barkley's back-up for the 2010 season. Before the season, Mustain was diagnosed with - and started treatment for - attention deficit hyperactivity disorder (ADHD). At the same time, Coach Pete Carroll left to coach in the NFL and was replaced by Lane Kiffin, who stuck with Barkley as the starter. Mustain continued to back up Barkley until Barkley was injured in the next-to-last game of the season, allowing Mustain to start his first football game since playing at Arkansas in 2006. Starting in the Notre Dame rivalry game, Mustain put up 21-for-38 passes for 183 yards with one interception in a game that became known for a pass that was dropped: In the final two minutes of the game, Mustain threw an accurate pass to a wide-open Ronald Johnson that would have likely resulted in a touchdown and the probable win, but Johnson bobbled the ball and dropped it. Moments after the drop, Mustain threw his only interception of the game to seal the loss.

Mustain was arrested on February 1, 2011, for selling his prescription ADHD medication. Eventually, he entered into a pre-trial community service program in order to avoid a more severe sentence.

=== Statistics ===
| Year | Team | Passing | | | | | | | | Rushing | | | |
| Year | Team | Cmp | Att | Pct | Yds | Y/A | TD | Int | Rtg | Att | Yds | Avg | TD |
|---|---|---|---|---|---|---|---|---|---|---|---|---|---|
| 2006 | Arkansas | 69 | 132 | 52.3 | 894 | 6.8 | 10 | 9 | 120.5 | 13 | -20 | -1.5 | 1 |
| 2008 | USC | 11 | 16 | 68.8 | 157 | 9.8 | 2 | 2 | 167.4 | 4 | -8 | -2.0 | 0 |
| 2010 | USC | 41 | 73 | 56.2 | 348 | 4.8 | 1 | 1 | 98.0 | 6 | 10 | 1.7 | 1 |
| Career | | 121 | 221 | 54.8 | 1,399 | 6.3 | 13 | 12 | 116.5 | 23 | -18 | -0.8 | 2 |

== Professional football career ==
Mustain was rated the 24th best quarterback in the 2011 NFL draft by NFLDraftScout.com.

Pre-draft measurables
| Height | Weight | 40-yard dash | 10-yard split | 20-yard split | 20-yard shuttle | Three-cone drill | Vertical jump | Broad jump | Bench press |
|---|---|---|---|---|---|---|---|---|---|
| 6 ft 2 in (1.88 m) | 211 lb (96 kg) | 4.90 s | 1.71 s | 2.89 s | 4.23 s | 6.95 s | 29 in (0.74 m) | 9 ft 4 in (2.84 m) | 18 reps |
All values from USC Pro Day

=== Hamilton Tiger-Cats ===
Mustain went undrafted in the 2011 NFL draft, and signed a 10-day free agent contract with the Hamilton Tiger-Cats of the Canadian Football League on June 1, 2011, to see if he could win a backup job. He was unable to impress and was released by the Tiger-Cats on June 10, 2011.

Mustain then worked at a friend's car dealership in Bentonville before signing with a new team in September.

=== Georgia Force ===
On September 30, 2011, Mustain signed with the Georgia Force of the Arena Football League.

=== San Jose SaberCats ===
In January 2013, Mustain signed with the San Jose SaberCats to backup legendary Arena Football League quarterback, Aaron Garcia. In April 2013, the Sabercats signed Russ Michna as their new starting quarterback, while Mustain remained the backup and Garcia was traded. Mustain replaced Michna on June 1, 2013, after Michna was injured and was able to make his first AFL start the next week while Michna was out.

Mustain's rookie option was exercised by the SaberCats in the offseason.

=== San Antonio Talons ===
On January 27, 2014, Mustain was traded, along with Jabari Fletcher, to the San Antonio Talons in exchange for Joe Sykes. After starting the first three games of the season for the Talons, Mustain was placed on reassignment on April 1.

=== Career statistics ===
| Year | Team | Passing | | | | | | | Rushing | | |
| Year | Team | Cmp | Att | Pct | Yds | TD | Int | Rtg | Att | Yds | TD |
|---|---|---|---|---|---|---|---|---|---|---|---|
| 2013 | San Jose | 50 | 93 | 53.8 | 632 | 11 | 3 | 91.33 | 2 | -14 | 0 |
| 2014 | San Antonio | 49 | 99 | 49.5 | 538 | 7 | 5 | 62.61 | 3 | 3 | 2 |
| Career | | 99 | 192 | 51.6 | 1,170 | 18 | 8 | 76.52 | 5 | -11 | 2 |

== Baseball career ==
Mitch Mustain
- Pitcher
- Born: February 27, 1988 (age 38); Fayetteville, Arkansas, U.S.
- Bats: Right Throws: Right
- Stats at Baseball Reference

It was announced on February 9, 2012, that the Chicago White Sox had signed Mustain to a minor league contract. Mustain, who had not pitched since high school, threw a 90 mph fastball at a tryout in front of a White Sox scout in January 2012. While attending USC, Mustain commented to a reporter that he had considered once again pursuing baseball though he never played for the Trojans during his time there. Mustain reported to spring training with the White Sox on March 8, 2012. On June 19, Mustain made his professional debut for the rookie-level Bristol White Sox against the Bluefield Blue Jays. Throwing the 8th and 9th innings, Mustain gave up two hits and recorded two strikeouts in two scoreless innings. The White Sox lost 7–2 in the season opener. Mustain made eleven appearances with Bristol before moving on to the Single-A Kannapolis Intimidators, where he pitched in eight contests. Overall, he pitched in 19 games in 2012, going 2–2 with a 4.63 ERA, 12 strikeouts, and one save.
