= Terrelle Pryor =

American football player (born 1989)

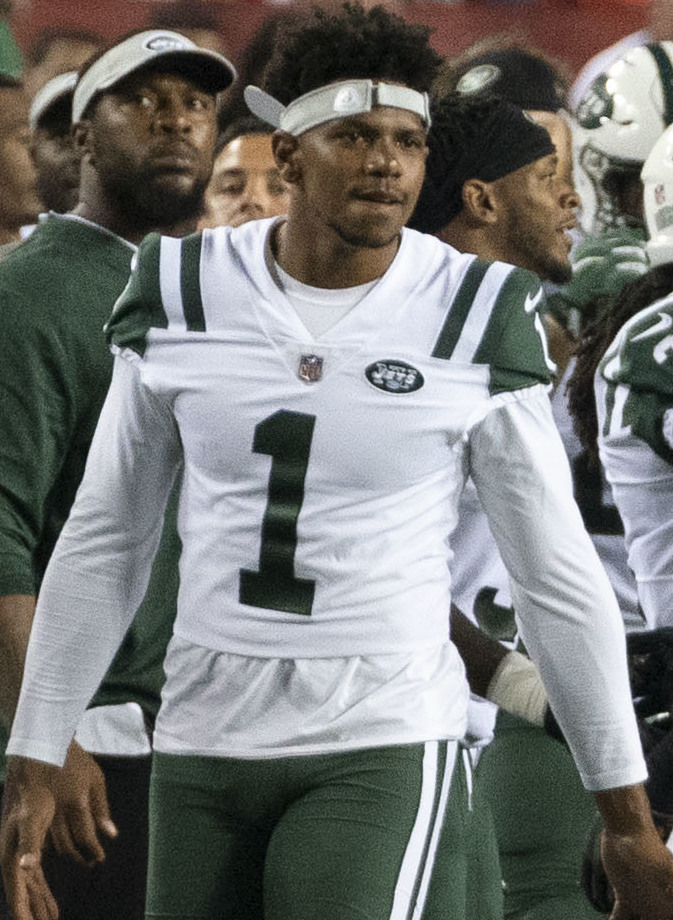
- Pryor with the New York Jets in 2018

No. 6, 2, 17, 11, 16, 10
- Positions: Wide receiver, quarterback

Personal information
- Born: June 20, 1989 (age 37); Jeannette, Pennsylvania, U.S.
- Listed height: 6 ft 4 in (1.93 m)
- Listed weight: 228 lb (103 kg)

Career information
- High school: Jeannette
- College: Ohio State (2008–2010)
- Supplemental draft: 2011: 3rd round

Career history
- Oakland Raiders (2011–2013); Seattle Seahawks (2014)*; Kansas City Chiefs (2015)*; Cincinnati Bengals (2015)*; Cleveland Browns (2015–2016); Washington Redskins (2017); New York Jets (2018); Buffalo Bills (2018); Jacksonville Jaguars (2019)*
- * Offseason or practice squad member only

Awards and highlights
- Rose Bowl Offensive MVP (2010); Big Ten Freshman of the Year (2008); NFL record: Longest touchdown run by a quarterback: 93 yards

Career NFL statistics
- Receptions: 115
- Receiving yards: 1,563
- Receiving touchdowns: 7
- Rushing yards: 646
- Passing attempts: 311
- Passing completions: 175
- Completion percentage: 56.3%
- Passing yards: 1,994
- TD–INT: 9–12
- Passer rating: 69.3
- Stats at Pro Football Reference

Terrelle Pryor Sr. (born June 20, 1989) is an American former professional football player who was a wide receiver and quarterback in the National Football League (NFL). Considered the most recruited high school football-basketball athlete in southwestern Pennsylvania since Tom Clements, Pryor was widely regarded as the nation's top football prospect of 2008 and was named "Junior of the Year" by Rivals.com. Pryor had originally hoped to be a two-sport athlete, as he was also one of the nation's most recruited high school basketball players, but he later chose football.

He was the starting quarterback for the Ohio State Buckeyes from 2008 to 2010, winning the Big Ten championship twice. His college career was marred by several suspensions and accusations of selling memorabilia and led to his eventual withdrawal from the university. Pryor was drafted by the Oakland Raiders in the third round of the 2011 NFL supplemental draft. He then played quarterback for the Raiders from 2011 to 2013 and later spent time with the Seattle Seahawks, Kansas City Chiefs, and Cincinnati Bengals. He converted full-time to wide receiver with the Cleveland Browns in 2015 and played that position for the Washington Redskins, New York Jets, Buffalo Bills, and Jacksonville Jaguars.

== Early life ==
As a freshman at Jeannette High School, Pryor was clocked at 4.4 seconds in the 40-yard dash and 22.40 seconds in the 200-meter dash, and because of his athleticism and 6 ft 4 in (1.93 m) frame, he drew comparisons to former Texas standout Vince Young, as well as Philadelphia Eagles-era Randall Cunningham. Pryor also lived up to his recruiting ranking as a basketball player by leading the Jeannette Jayhawks to win their first WPIAL Championship in over 20 years, and then on to win the Pennsylvania PIAA state basketball championship game as a senior. During his junior year, he led the Jayhawks to their first Pennsylvania PIAA Class "AA" state football championship game where they lost to the Warriors of Wilson Area High School. During the 2007 football season, Pryor and the Jayhawks repeated as champions of the WPIAL. Following the Pennsylvania state semi-finals against the Greyhounds from Wilmington Area High School, Terrelle became the first player in the history of Pennsylvania high school football to run for 4,000 yards and also throw for 4,000 yards. The following week, Pryor led the Jayhawks to their first-ever Pennsylvania state championship by defeating the Dunmore Bucks, 49–21. At the conclusion of the season, Pryor had quarterbacked the Jayhawks to a Pennsylvania state season record of 860 points.

Pryor's high school accomplishments include being the two-time Pennsylvania Player of the Year, the offensive Player of the Year and the MVP of the U.S. Army All-American Bowl. He was named to the Parade All-America football team for the 2007 season and was selected as the Parade National Player of the Year.

As a basketball player, Pryor was named a fourth-team Parade All-American in 2008.

=== College recruiting ===
Terrelle Pryor passes behind Justin Boren
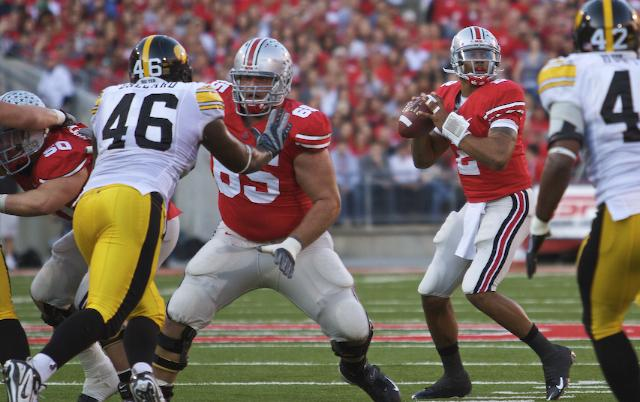
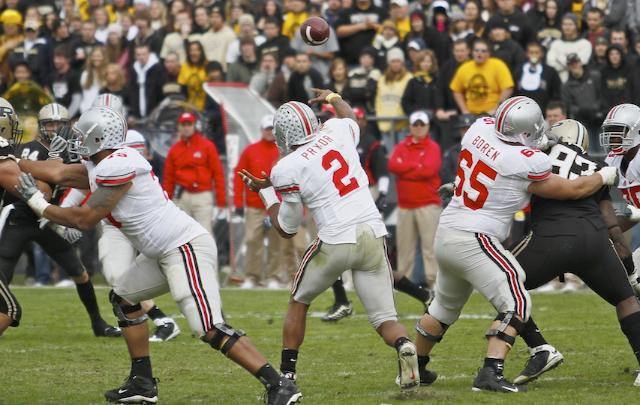

Pryor was widely considered one of the top football recruits in the Class of 2008. He was ranked number four in the ESPNU 150 and the number one quarterback. Throughout his high school career, Pryor acquired numerous scholarship offers, initially committing to the hometown University of Pittsburgh to play basketball under coach Jamie Dixon. However, by his senior year his top interests were Ohio State, Penn State, Michigan, Oregon and West Virginia. Sports Illustrated called Pryor's announcement "the most anticipated signing day announcement in history."

Pryor originally intended to announce his decision on February 6, National Signing Day, but later changed his mind, stating he still had not decided among Michigan, Ohio State, Oregon, and Penn State. Following the Jeannette basketball team's state championship victory on March 15, Pryor stated he would make his college decision within one week. On March 19, 2008, Pryor announced at a press conference that he would attend Ohio State University.

== College career ==
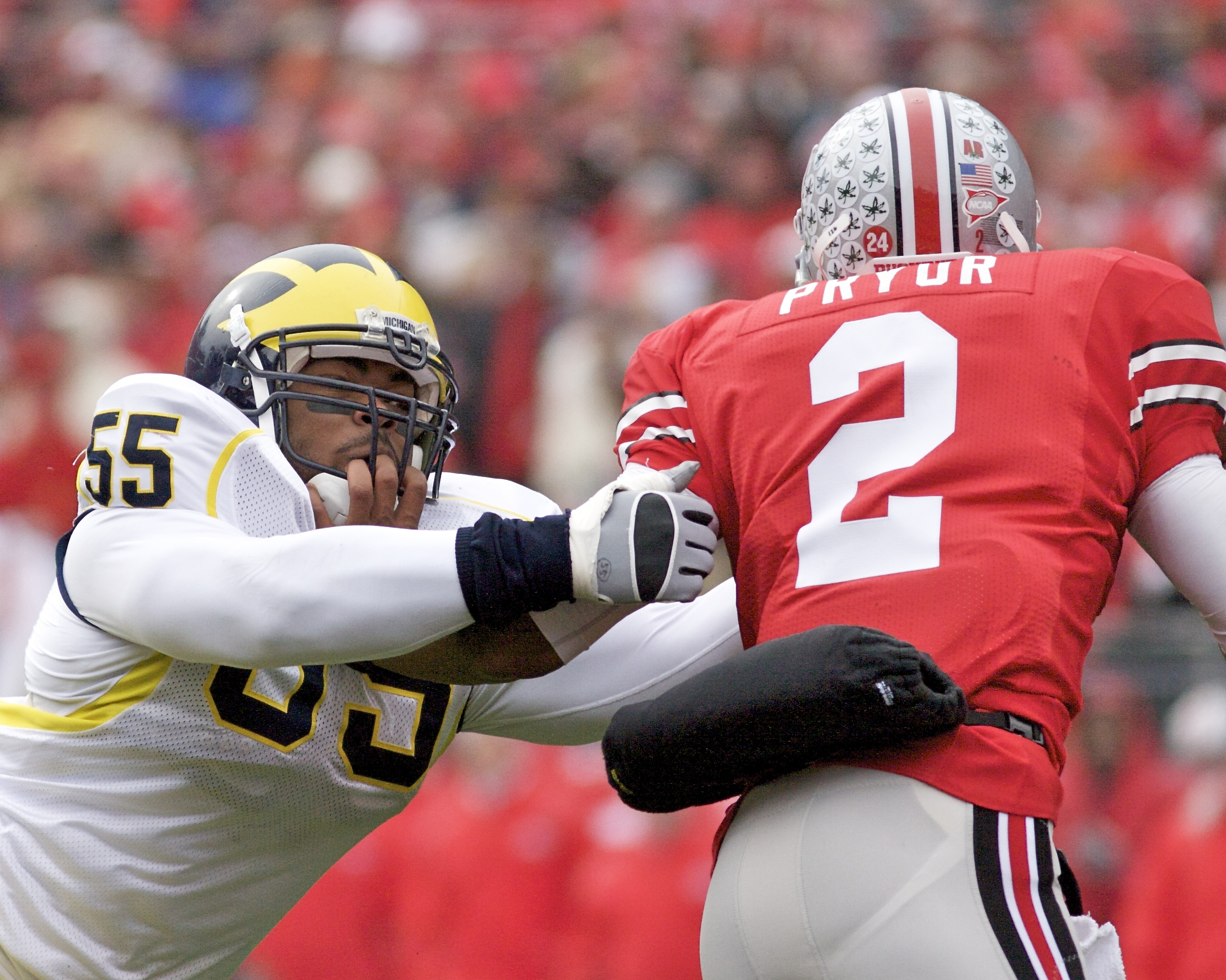
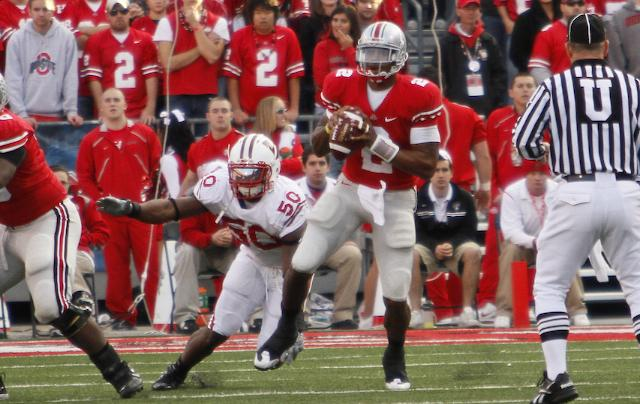
Pryor attempts to elude Brandon Graham during 2008 Michigan – Ohio State rivalry game (left) and O'Brien Schofield (right) in 2009.

Pryor saw limited action in the Buckeye's season opener against Youngstown State. He took more snaps against USC on September 13, 2008, completing 7-of-9 passes for 59 yards, as well as rushing for 40 yards on 11 carries.

On September 20, 2008, Pryor threw for a freshman school-record four touchdowns and one interception in his first career start for Ohio State. Ohio State beat Troy 28–10. On October 4, 2008, Pryor ran for the winning touchdown against Wisconsin on an option play with running back Chris "Beanie" Wells. On October 25, 2008, in an Ohio State loss against Penn State Pryor threw for a career-high 226 yards, connecting on 16 of 25 passes. Against Illinois on November 15, 2008, Pryor had his first career 100-yard rushing day running for 110 yards and a touchdown. In the Fiesta Bowl against Texas, he lined up at receiver and caught his first touchdown pass in college. Pryor led Ohio State to an 8–1 record as a starter in his freshman year; his only loss as a starter was against Penn State. (Todd Boeckman made the start in the Fiesta Bowl against Texas.) Following the 2008 Big Ten Conference football season, he was an honorable mention All-Big Ten Conference selection by the media and Big Ten Freshman of the Year by the coaches.

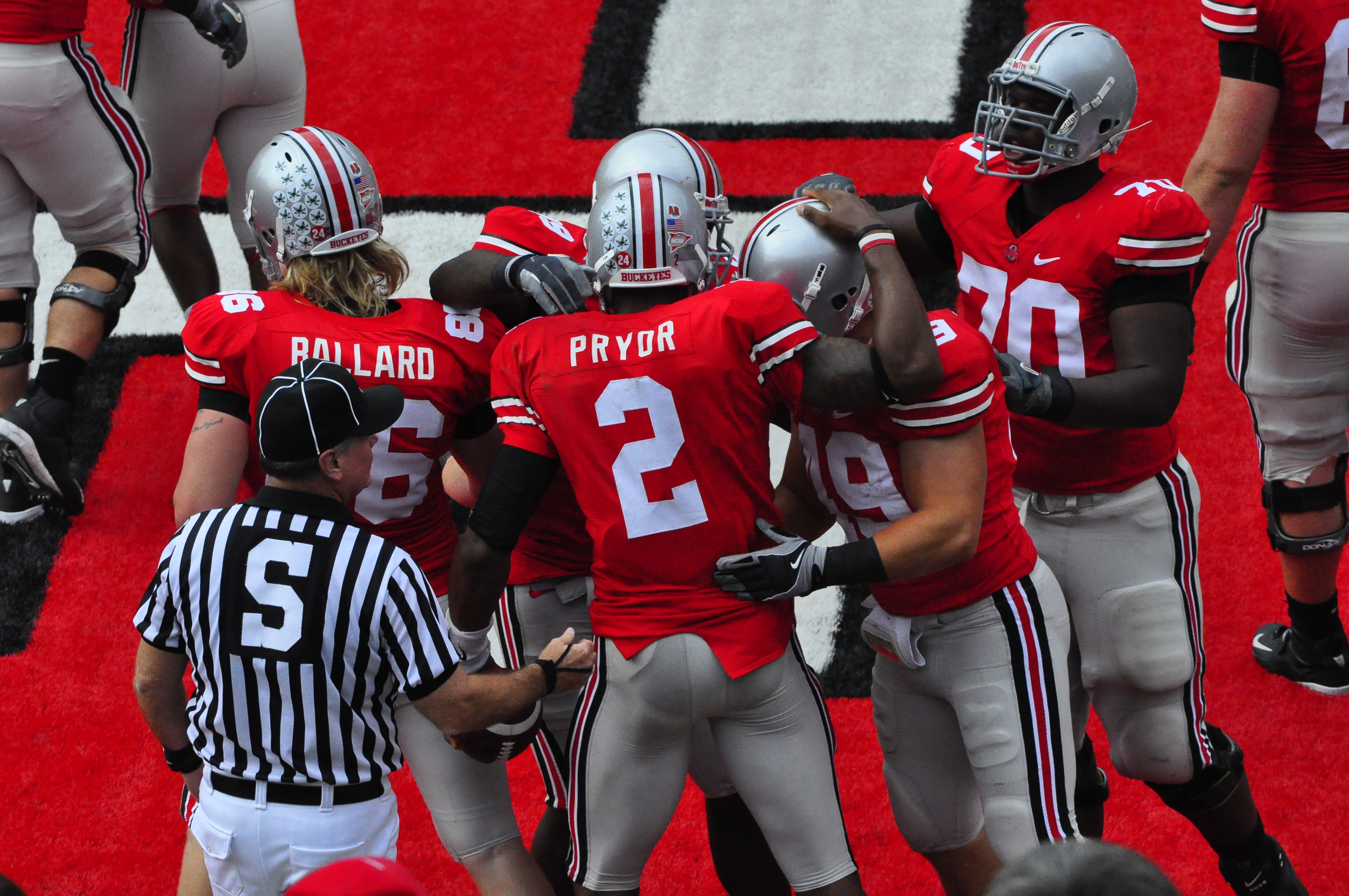
Pryor with his teammates at the 2008 Minnesota game

Before his sophomore year began, he ran a 4.33 40-yard dash in a race against Ray Small and many others. He was the fastest Buckeye in 2009. In his sophomore year, Pryor led the Buckeyes to another Big Ten Championship. After starting the season slow, he eventually developed into a better passer, and went on to earn the 2010 Rose Bowl MVP trophy after leading Ohio State to a 26–17 victory over Oregon. Pryor had the best passing game of his career, and also rushed for 72 yards. Following the 2009 Big Ten Conference football season, he was an honorable mention All-Big Ten Conference selection by the media.

Ohio State began the 2010 season second in most polls and Pryor began the season as a favorite for numerous awards. On September 25, 2010, Pryor had a break-out game in a 73–20 win over Eastern Michigan. He had six total touchdowns, including one rushing and one receiving. Following the 2010 Big Ten Conference football season, he was an honorable mention All-Big Ten Conference selection by both the coaches and the media. He was edged out by Denard Robinson as the 2010 Big Ten Conference MVP as voted by the Big Ten coaches. They had the same number of first place votes. His 27 passing touchdowns led the Big Ten.

On December 23, 2010, the NCAA ruled that Pryor and four of his teammates would be suspended for the first five games of the 2011 season, as a sanction for selling memorabilia. This suspension did not involve the controversial decision to allow Pryor and his teammates to participate in the university's season-ending Sugar Bowl game on January 4, 2011.

=== NCAA investigation and departure from Ohio State ===
On May 31, 2011, head coach Jim Tressel resigned. Multiple media outlets also reported that Pryor had been driving on a license that was suspended by the State of Ohio. He drove a Nissan 350Z to a team meeting and workout. ESPN reported that his suspension was to expire on August 18, 2011. In a subsequent report, ESPN also alleged that Pryor made thousands of dollars autographing memorabilia for a local booster, a charge denied by Pryor's attorney.

On June 7, 2011, it was announced that Pryor had chosen to withdraw from the university. On June 26, 2011, Pryor was banned from all contact with the university's athletic program and new incoming recruits. This caused him to become eligible for the NFL's supplemental draft.

== Professional career ==
=== Pre-draft ===
Pre-draft measurables
Height	Weight	40-yard dash	20-yard shuttle	Three-cone drill	Vertical jump	Broad jump	Wonderlic
6 ft 4 1/2 in (1.94 m)	240 lb (109 kg)	4.38 s	4.30 s	7.20 s	31.0 in (0.79 m)	10 ft 4 in (3.15 m)	21
All values from Pryor's Pro Day Wonderlic

Pryor held his Pro Day on August 20, 2011, in Hempfield Township, Westmoreland County, Pennsylvania, where representatives from 17 NFL teams were present, including the Oakland Raiders. As was widely anticipated, Pryor demonstrated excellent athleticism and speed for a 6'4½" athlete weighing in at 240 pounds. His 40-yard dash times were clocked from 4.32 to 4.54 seconds, a range of times considered extremely fast for an athlete of his height and weight. Some scouts noted that the turf Pryor ran on was soft, and that he would have been even faster on a harder surface like those found in the NFL. His throwing was regarded as less impressive, as he completed 27 of 39 passes for just under a 70% completion rate, with four of those passes being dropped by receivers.

=== Oakland Raiders ===
==== 2011 season ====
The Oakland Raiders selected Pryor in the third round of the 2011 supplemental draft on August 22, 2011; he was the last pick longtime owner Al Davis made in his tenure with the Raiders, thus ending the Al Davis "speed era" including players Bo Jackson, Darrius Heyward-Bey, and Cliff Branch among others. Three days later, Pryor and the Raiders agreed to a four-year contract. Pryor served an NFL-mandated five-game suspension at the beginning of the 2011 season (the suspension being from the Ohio State scandal), but was still able to work out with the club. Pryor was reinstated the day following the team's win over the Houston Texans.

In a Week 7 game against the Kansas City Chiefs on October 23, Pryor saw his first NFL action. He lined up at the wide receiver spot, motioned behind center and ran a quarterback sneak, although the play was nullified due to a false start penalty on Pryor.

==== 2012 season ====
Pryor sat out for most of the 2012 season; however, one of his few appearances was a 22-yard reception thrown by Carson Palmer in Week 16 against the Carolina Panthers. Pryor was named the starting quarterback in the season finale against the San Diego Chargers after season-long starting quarterback Palmer went down with an injury the previous week. In his first start, Pryor threw for two touchdowns and rushed for another, but he also threw an interception and only completed 46% of his passes in a three-point loss.

==== 2013 season ====
Following Palmer's trade to the Arizona Cardinals, Pryor was expected to compete with newly acquired quarterbacks Matt Flynn and Tyler Wilson for the Raiders' starting job in 2013. Despite not being given the number 2 jersey at the beginning of his career by the then-coach Hue Jackson because it was formerly worn by JaMarcus Russell, he was able to switch with punter Marquette King and wear the number. On September 2, it was reported that Pryor would start in the season opener. In the first game against the Indianapolis Colts, he broke the Raiders' rushing record for a quarterback with 13 carries for 112 yards. This Raiders record was previously held by Rich Gannon.

In Week 2, the Raiders played at home versus the Jacksonville Jaguars. The Raiders played ball control in the game, rushing for over 150 yards and defeating the Jaguars 19–9. Pryor completed 15 of 24 passes for 126 yards and no interceptions. He also added 50 yards rushing on nine carries.

In Week 3, the Raiders played on the road against the Denver Broncos and the high powered Bronco offense led by quarterback Peyton Manning and wide receiver Wes Welker. Oakland trailed 17–0 before Pryor hit Denarius Moore for a 73-yard touchdown. Pryor was knocked out of the game in the second half after suffering a concussion, but finished 19 for 28 for 281 yards. Matt Flynn took over after Pryor left the game but the Raiders still lost 37–21.

In Week 4, Pryor was inactive versus the Washington Redskins. Flynn started the game but without the mobility of Pryor, the offense struggled and the Redskins prevailed over Oakland 24–14.

In Week 5, Pryor found himself once again at the helm and the Raiders responded against the San Diego Chargers. He threw two touchdowns in the first quarter and completed his first ten passes. Following an early interception against Chargers quarterback Philip Rivers, Pryor responded with a 44-yard touchdown strike to wideout Rod Streater. The second touchdown pass came on a two-yard pass to wideout Denarius Moore, which gave Oakland a 14–0 lead. In the second quarter, Pryor helped guide the Raiders to a field goal, which gave his team its first 17–0 lead at home since 2002. In the second half, both Pryor and the Raiders struggled as the Chargers came back to cut the lead to 24–17. Late in the fourth quarter, Pryor turned what looked to be an easy sack on third down into a 20-yard completion to Brice Butler, which led to a 50-yard field goal and sealed a 27–17 Raiders victory. His 135.7 passer rating versus San Diego marked the highest-rated game by a Raiders quarterback since Rich Gannon's 138.9 rating against the Tennessee Titans on September 29, 2002.

Pryor was sacked 10 times in a loss to the Kansas City Chiefs in Week 6; he also threw three interceptions in the game. He finished 18 of 34 for 216 yards and a touchdown pass to Denarius Moore.

In Week 8 against the Pittsburgh Steelers, Pryor opened the game with a 93-yard run for touchdown, the longest in NFL history for a quarterback. It was also the longest run of any player in Raiders history. The previous record for Oakland was a 92-yarder set by Bo Jackson on November 5, 1989. Pryor finished with nine carries for 106 yards and 10 of 19 passing for 88 yards, two touchdowns and two interceptions.

In Week 9 on November 10, Pryor was injured in a 24–20 loss to the New York Giants and was sidelined with a sprained MCL. Having had his passing production dip for four games and then being hampered by a right knee sprain limiting his movement in the pocket, in November 24 game against the Tennessee Titans, he was activated to play, but was relegated to backup quarterback behind Matt McGloin. He returned as the starter in the regular season finale against the Denver Broncos.

=== Seattle Seahawks ===
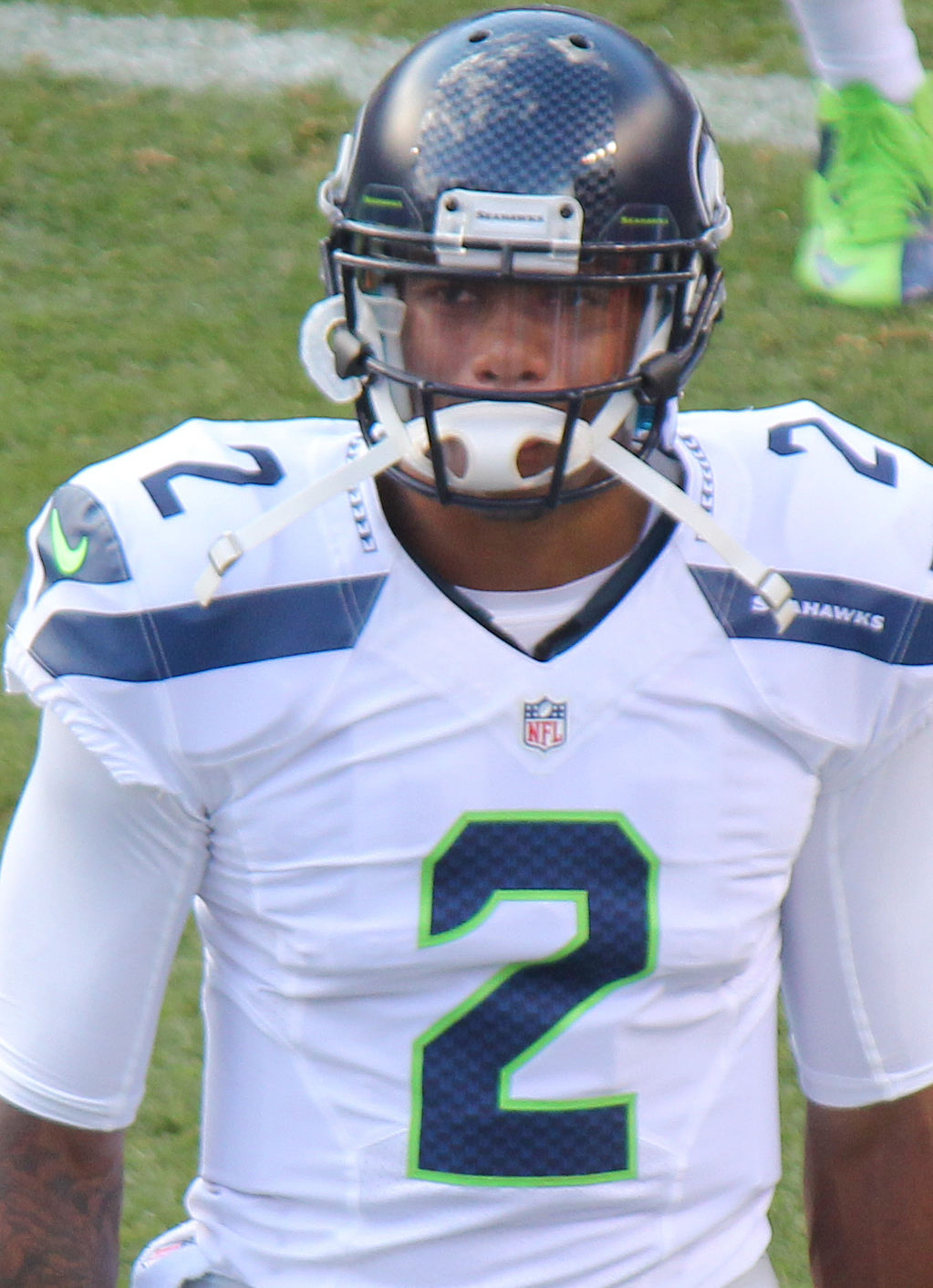
Pryor with the Seattle Seahawks in 2014

On April 21, 2014, Pryor was traded to the Seattle Seahawks for a seventh round pick in the 2014 NFL draft. He played in the preseason, but was released during the final roster cuts on August 29. After his release from the Seahawks, Pryor worked out for the Cincinnati Bengals, Philadelphia Eagles, New York Giants, and Washington Redskins, but did not sign a contract with any team.

=== Kansas City Chiefs ===
On January 7, 2015, Pryor signed a one-year contract with the Kansas City Chiefs. He was released by Kansas City on May 5.

=== Cincinnati Bengals ===
On May 10, 2015, Pryor signed with the Cincinnati Bengals. He was released by Cincinnati five weeks later on June 18.

The day after being cut by the Bengals, Pryor announced through his agent that he was open to switching his position to wide receiver.

=== Cleveland Browns ===
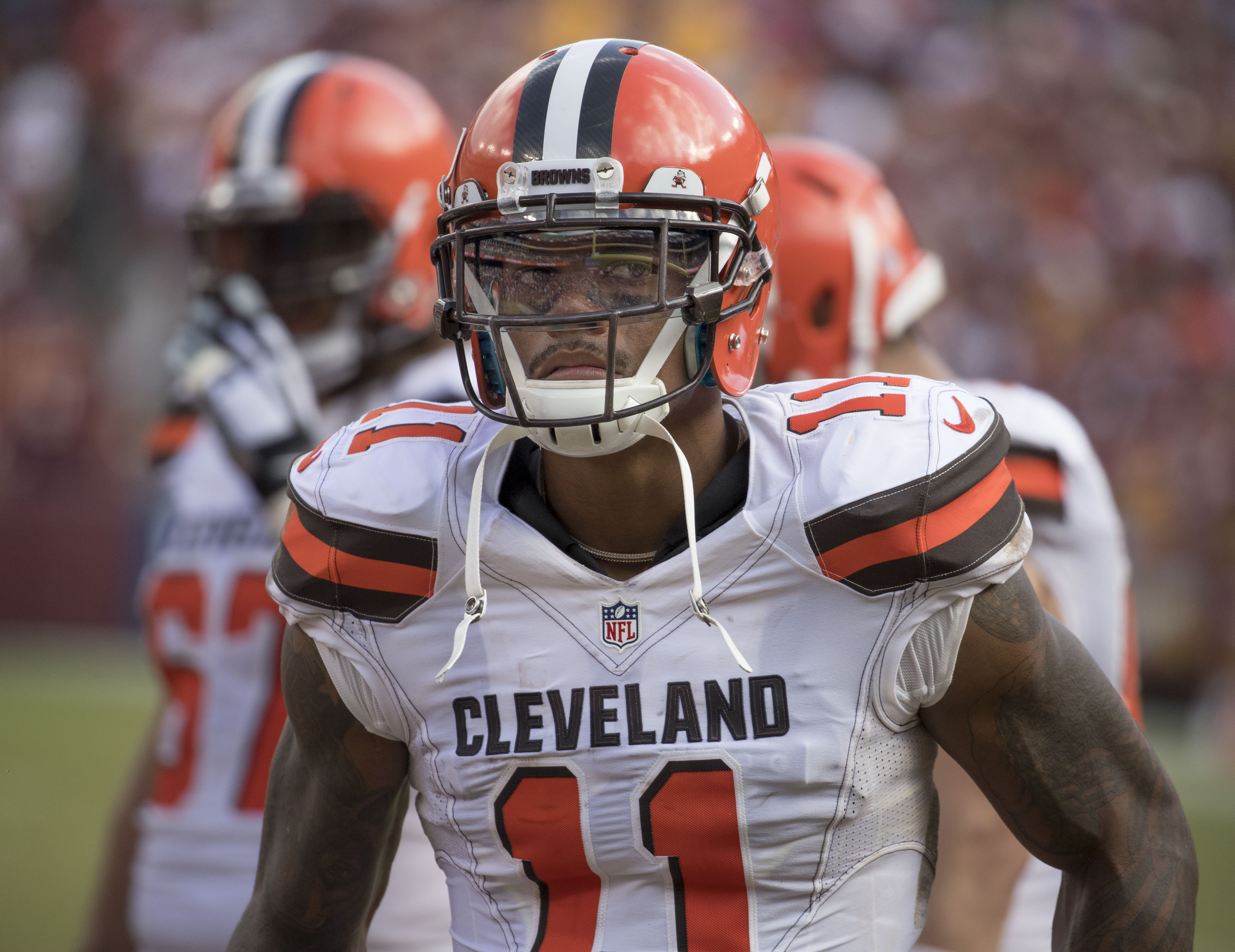
Pryor playing for the Cleveland Browns in 2016

The Cleveland Browns claimed Pryor off waivers on June 22, 2015, and he made the team's final 53-man squad on September 5, but was waived five days later. Following a season-ending injury to Josh McCown, Pryor was re-signed on December 2. He played in the last game of the season against the Pittsburgh Steelers as a wide receiver, recording one reception for 42 yards.

The Browns placed a $1.671 million tender on Pryor on March 7, 2016. At the onset of the regular season, Pryor was named a starter at wide receiver for the Browns. With Browns quarterbacks Robert Griffin III and Josh McCown inactive during a Week 3 contest against the Miami Dolphins, Pryor started as a receiver and took a few snaps at quarterback behind rookie Cody Kessler. He also had one play at safety at the end of the second half. Along with his 144 receiving yards, Pryor finished the loss with three completions for 35 yards, 21 rushing yards and scored his first rushing touchdown as a Brown. He was the first player in the NFL to have at least 120 receiving yards, 30 passing yards, and 20 rushing yards in a game since Frank Gifford did so for the New York Giants in 1959. On October 2, Pryor caught his first career touchdown on a nine-yard pass from Kessler. He finished the loss to the Washington Redskins with five receptions for 46 receiving yards and one touchdown. During Week 6 against the Tennessee Titans, he finished the game with a total of nine receptions for 75 yards and two touchdowns. He had six receptions for 101 receiving yards in Week 8 against the New York Jets. In Week 12, against the New York Giants, he had six receptions for 131 receiving yards. Pryor finished the season with 77 receptions for 1,007 yards and four touchdowns. His 818 air yards ranked seventh among NFL wide receivers in 2016.

=== Washington Redskins ===
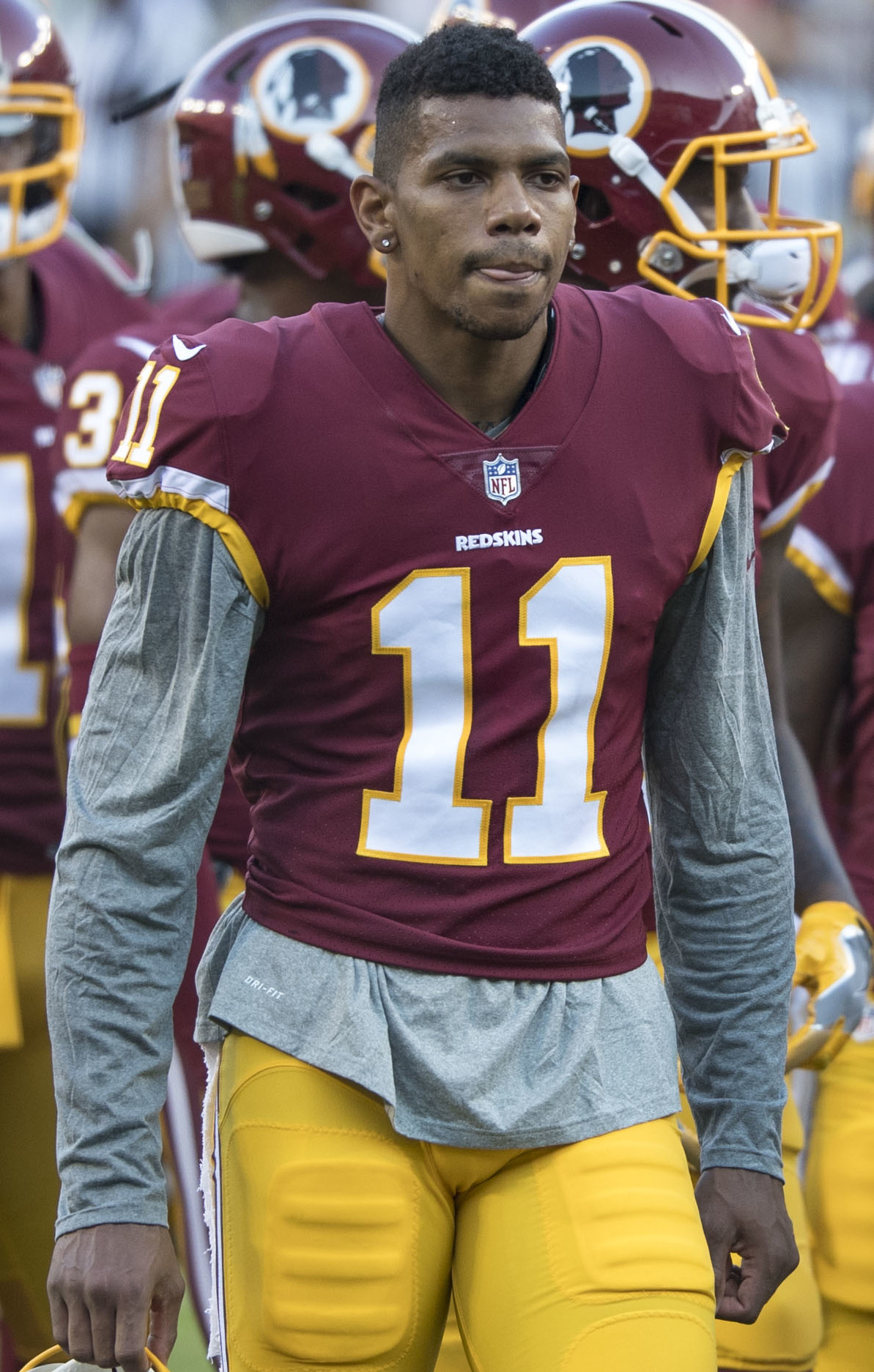
Pryor in 2017

On March 10, 2017, Pryor signed a one-year, $8 million contract with the Washington Redskins. During his Redskins debut in the season opening game against the Philadelphia Eagles, Pryor had six receptions for 66 yards. Pryor caught his first touchdown pass with the team against the Kansas City Chiefs in Week 4. He was placed on injured reserve on November 21, after opting to have surgery on his ankle, an injury he had been dealing with since Week 2.

=== New York Jets ===
On March 25, 2018, Pryor signed a one-year deal worth $4.5 million featuring $2 million guaranteed with the New York Jets. He played in six games, recording 14 receptions for 235 yards and two touchdowns before being released on October 20. Prior to his release, Pryor had been dealing with a groin injury.

=== Buffalo Bills ===
On October 30, 2018, Pryor signed with the Buffalo Bills. He was released by the Bills on November 13.

=== Jacksonville Jaguars ===
On May 30, 2019, Pryor signed with the Jacksonville Jaguars. He was placed on injured reserve on August 31, and was released by Jacksonville three days later.

== Career statistics ==
=== NFL ===
Legend
	NFL record (for quarterbacks)
**Bold**	Career high

Year	Team	Games			Passing									Rushing					Receiving					Sacked		Fumbles	
Year	Team	GP	GS	Record	Cmp	Att	Pct	Yds	Y/A	Lng	TD	Int	Rtg	Att	Yds	Y/A	Lng	TD	Rec	Yds	Y/R	Lng	TD	Sck	SckY	Fum	Lost
2011	OAK	1	0	—	0	0	—	0	—	0	0	0	—	0	0	—	0	0	0	0	—	0	0	0	0	0	0
2012	OAK	3	1	0–1	14	30	46.7	155	5.2	38	2	1	**70.8**	10	51	5.1	9	1	1	22	22.0	22	0	0	0	**7**	**2**
2013	OAK	11	9	**3–6**	**156**	**272**	**57.4**	**1,798**	**6.6**	**73**	**7**	**11**	69.1	**83**	**576**	**6.9**	**93**	**2**	0	0	—	0	0	**31**	**203**	0	0
2015	CLE	3	2	—	0	0	—	0	—	0	0	0	—	1	−1	−1.0	−1	0	1	42	**42.0**	42	0	0	0	1	0
2016	CLE	**16**	**15**	—	5	9	55.6	41	4.6	26	0	0	67.4	8	21	2.6	15	1	**77**	**1,007**	13.1	**54**	**4**	1	1	0	0
2017	WAS	9	2	—	0	0	—	0	—	0	0	0	—	0	0	—	0	0	20	240	12.0	44	1	0	0	0	0
2018	NYJ	6	0	—	0	0	—	0	—	0	0	0	—	0	0	—	0	0	14	235	16.8	44	2	0	0	0	0
2018	BUF	2	1	—	0	0	—	0	—	0	0	0	—	1	−1	−1.0	−1	0	2	17	8.5	11	0	0	0	0	0
Career		51	30	3–7	175	311	56.3	1,994	6.4	73	9	12	68.6	103	646	6.3	93	4	115	1,563	13.6	54	7	32	204	8	2

=== College ===
Season	Team	Passing								Rushing			
Season	Team	Cmp	Att	Pct	Yds	Y/A	TD	Int	Rtg	Att	Yds	Avg	TD
2008	Ohio State	100	165	60.6	1,311	7.9	12	4	146.5	139	631	4.5	6
2009	Ohio State	167	295	56.6	2,094	7.1	18	11	128.9	162	779	4.8	7
2010	Ohio State	210	323	65.0	2,772	8.6	27	11	157.9	135	754	5.6	4
Career		477	783	60.9	6,177	7.9	57	26	144.6	436	2,164	5.0	17

== Career highlights ==
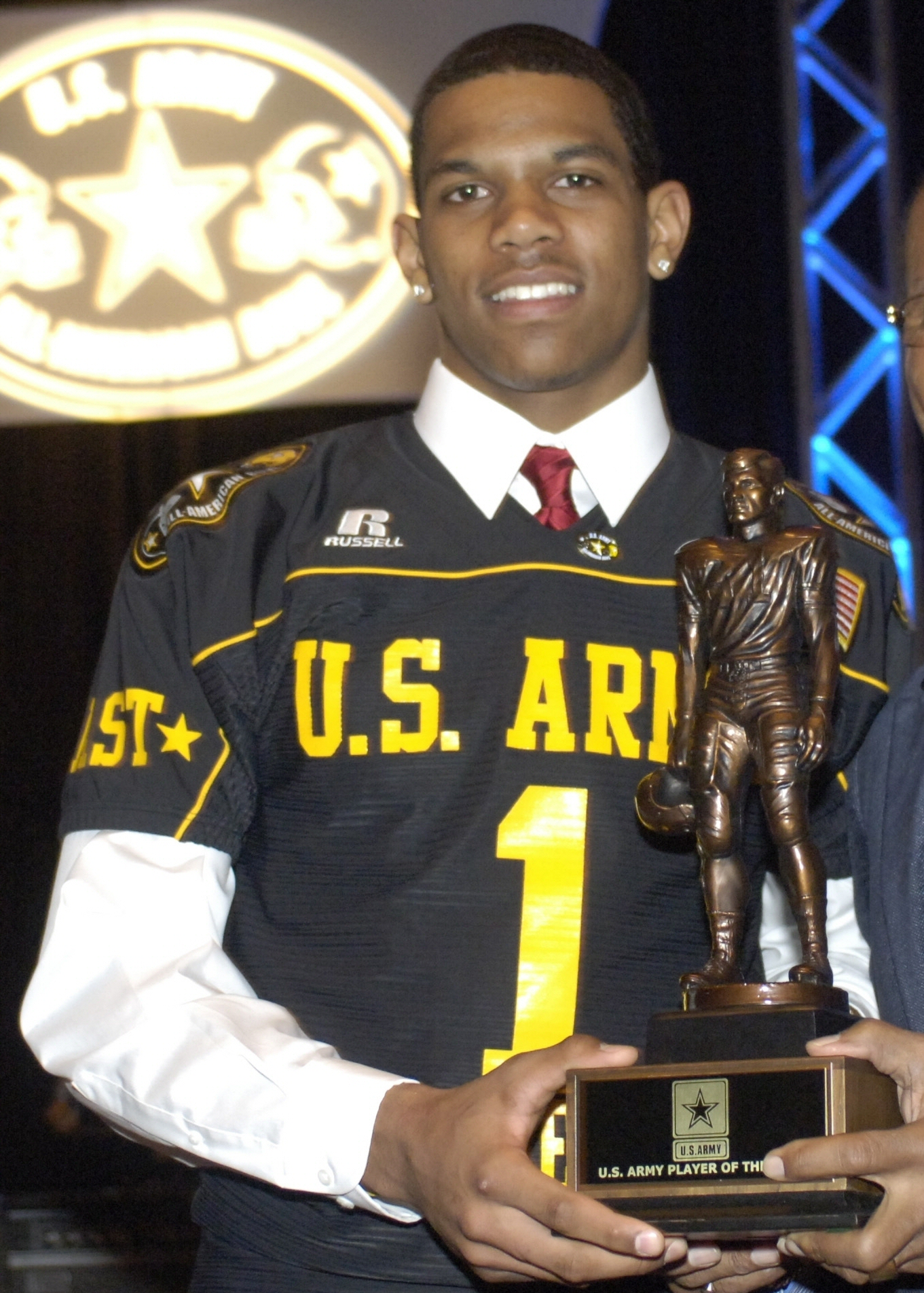
Pryor in 2008

NFL

- NFL record longest touchdown run by a quarterback: 93 yards

College

- Big Ten Freshman of the Year (2008) (coaches)
- All-Big Ten Honorable Mention (media) (2008)
- Tostitos Fiesta Bowl Sportsmanship Award (2009)
- Big Ten Preseason Player of the Year (2009)
- All-Big Ten Honorable Mention (media) (2009)
- Rose Bowl Offensive MVP (2010) Rose Bowl MVP
- All-Big Ten Honorable Mention (coaches and media) (2010)
- Big Ten MVP runner-up (2010)
- Miller-Digby Award (Vacated award due to NCAA sanctions) (2011)

High school

- Hall Trophy (U.S. Army Player of the Year) (2007)
- PARADE National Player of the Year and All-American (2007)
- Pete Dawkins Trophy (U.S. Army All-American Bowl MVP) (2008)
- U.S. Army All-American MVP (2008)

== Personal life ==
On February 7, 2015, Pryor witnessed a shooting in the Macy's department store at Monroeville Mall in Monroeville, Pennsylvania.

Pryor was stabbed in the neck and chest early on November 29, 2019, during an incident with Shalaya Briston at the Heinz Loft Apartments in Pittsburgh. The two "mutual combatants in the incident" were each subsequently charged with assault, according to the Allegheny County District Attorney's Office, after Pryor arrived at UPMC Mercy in critical condition from stab wounds.

On October 6, 2021, Pryor was arrested after allegedly slapping his ex-girlfriend and throwing pumpkins at her car.

On May 31, 2025, Pryor was involved in a serious car crash. He is alleged to have run a red light and struck a car while driving an uninsured Cybertruck. The impact of the crash caused the other vehicle, a Nissan Rogue occupied by three women, to flip. The vehicle was pinned against a light pole and the three occupants suffered severe injuries, including broken bones and a spinal herniation. On October 22, 2025, the three passengers in the car he is alleged to have hit filed two lawsuits against him for negligence.

On May 24, 2026, Pryor was arrested in Monroeville, Pennsylvania on a misdemeanor charge of possession of a controlled substance.
