= LeGarrette Blount =

American football player (born 1986)

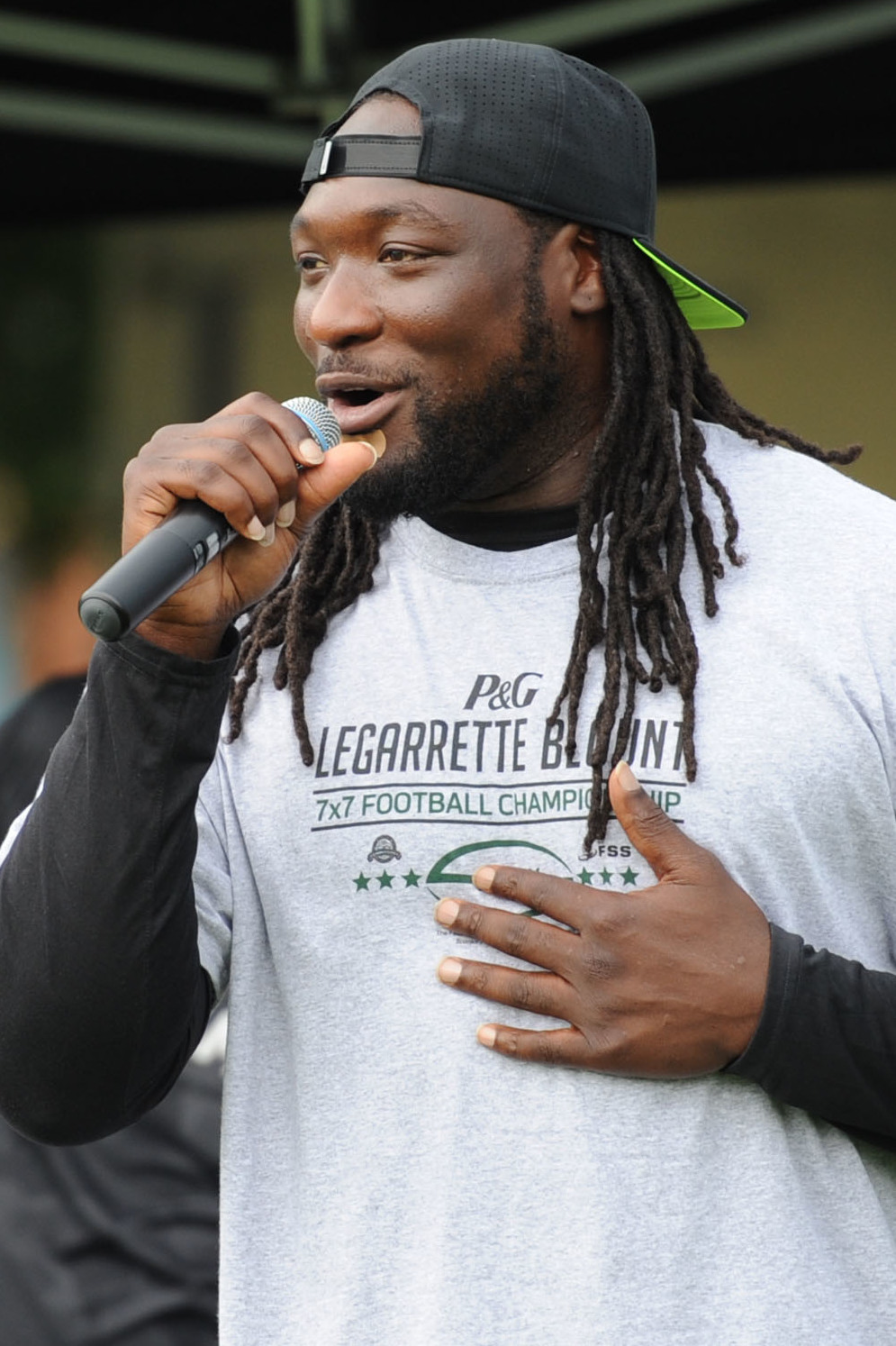
- Blount in 2017

No. 27, 29
- Position: Running back

Personal information
- Born: December 5, 1986 (age 39); Madison, Florida, U.S.
- Listed height: 6 ft 0 in (1.83 m)
- Listed weight: 247 lb (112 kg)

Career information
- High school: Perry (FL) Taylor County
- College: East Mississippi CC (2006–2007); Oregon (2008–2009)
- NFL draft: 2010: undrafted

Career history
- Tennessee Titans (2010)*; Tampa Bay Buccaneers (2010–2012); New England Patriots (2013); Pittsburgh Steelers (2014); New England Patriots (2014–2016); Philadelphia Eagles (2017); Detroit Lions (2018)
- * Offseason or practice squad member only

Awards and highlights
- 3× Super Bowl champion (XLIX, LI, LII); NFL rushing touchdowns leader (2016); PFWA All-Rookie Team (2010)

Career NFL statistics
- Rushing yards: 6,306
- Rushing average: 4.2
- Rushing touchdowns: 56
- Receptions: 64
- Receiving yards: 454
- Receiving touchdowns: 2
- Stats at Pro Football Reference

LeGarrette Montez Blount (/ˈlʌɡærɛt ˈblʌnt/; born December 5, 1986) is an American former professional football player who was a running back in the National Football League (NFL) for nine seasons. He played college football at the University of Oregon after transferring from East Mississippi Community College. Not selected in the 2010 NFL draft, he began his NFL career as an undrafted free agent.

Blount achieved his greatest success during his four nonconsecutive seasons with the New England Patriots, where he won two Super Bowl titles and led the league in rushing touchdowns during the 2016 season. Following his victories for New England in Super Bowl XLIX and Super Bowl LI, Blount was part of the Philadelphia Eagles team that won Super Bowl LII, making him one of six players to have consecutive Super Bowl titles for different franchises. He scored 11 playoff rushing touchdowns, which are tied for the sixth-most in NFL history.

== Early life ==
Blount was born December 5, 1986, in Madison, Florida, to Gary and Barbara Blount. He has two siblings. Blount attended Taylor County High School in the small town of Perry, Florida, where he was a two-sport star in both football and track & field. In high school football, he was a four-year starter and three-time 1,000-yard rusher. He first reached the milestone as a sophomore and equaled the feat the following season despite playing with a thigh bruise for most of the year. He was accorded second-team All-state player honors as a prep senior. In track and field, Blount competed in events such as the 100-meter dash (11.34 s), the long jump (22–1 or 6.75m), and the shot put (53–2 or 16.22m). He was also a member of the 4 × 100 m squad.

Considered only a two-star recruit by both Rivals.com and Scout.com, Blount was not ranked among the best running back prospects in the nation in the Class of 2005. Barely recruited out of high school, he attended camp at Auburn University but was not offered an athletic scholarship. He nonetheless intended to go to Auburn but did not qualify academically, so he headed for junior college at East Mississippi Community College.

== College career ==
=== East Mississippi Community College ===
While at East Mississippi Community College in Scooba, Mississippi, Blount rushed for more than 1,000 yards in each of his two seasons, accumulating 367 carries for 2,292 yards and 18 rushing touchdowns. Among his career highlights was a 273-yard performance with three touchdowns in a win over Northeast Mississippi Community College during his freshman year; he led the state of Mississippi in rushing yards with 1,106 as early as October 2006. Blount was rated as the top-ranked junior college prospect by The Clarion-Ledger and received Junior College All-American honors.

By the end of his sophomore year, Blount had become one of the highest ranked junior college prospects. He was named the nation's top junior college running back and the No. 12 overall prospect in the Rivals.com Junior College Top 100. Blount was heavily recruited by several high-major schools, including Florida State and West Virginia. He committed to Oregon in December 2007. Oregon coaches said Blount reminded them of former Oregon and NFL running back Reuben Droughns.

=== Oregon Ducks ===
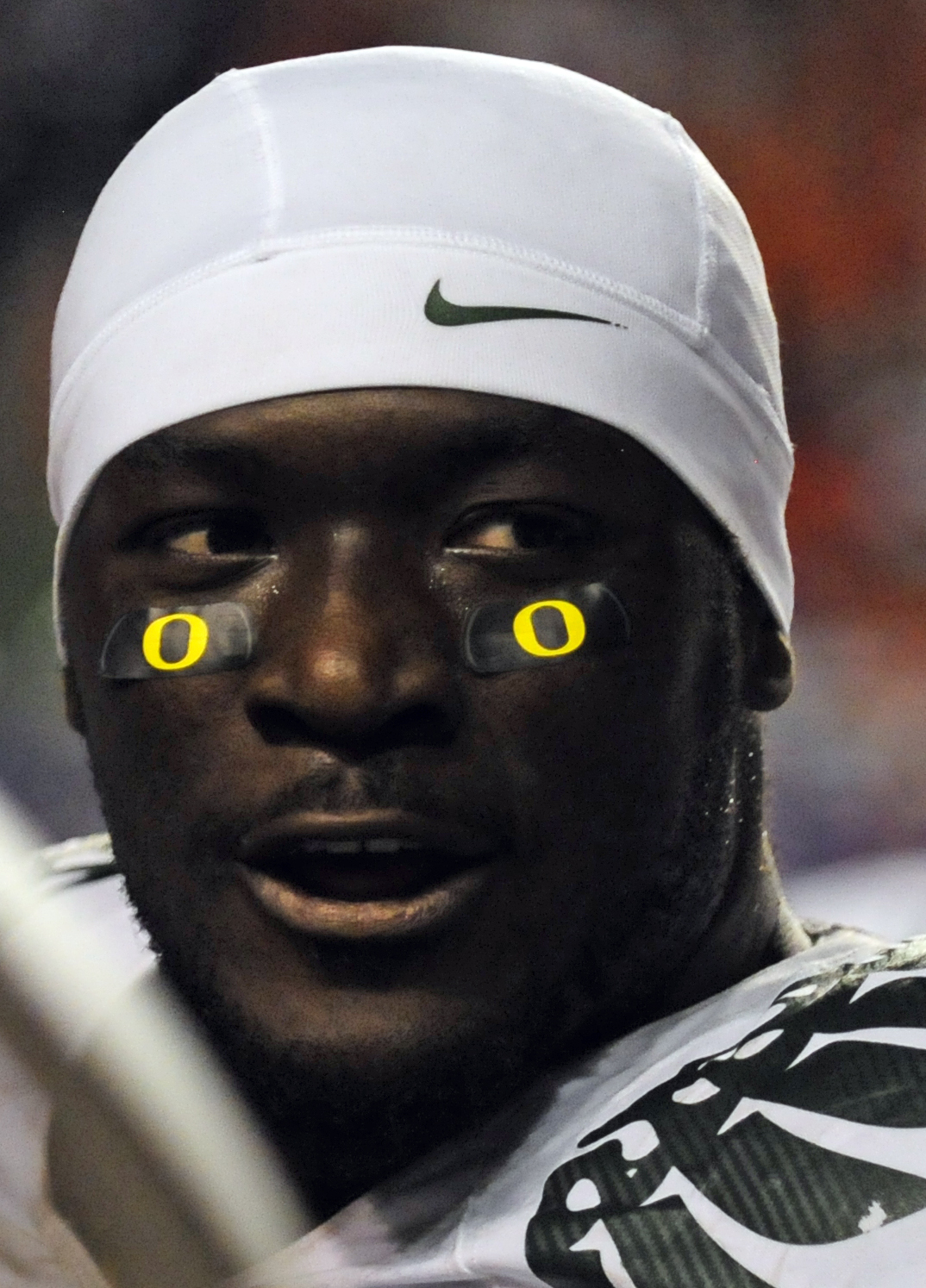
Blount on the opening day of the 2009 season at Boise State

Blount entered his junior year at Oregon sharing the running back role with senior Jeremiah Johnson. The two backs lived together, and the talkative Johnson advised Blount in his first Pac-10 season. The two backs each contributed nearly 100 yards and three touchdowns in an early 63–14 win over the Washington State Cougars, and both again performed well in a late season victory over the Oregon State Beavers in the Civil War. However, Blount would record lackluster performances in games against USC and Cal. Overall, Blount rushed for 17 touchdowns, setting a single-season school record, and just over 1,000 yards. Blount and Johnson became only the second duo in team history to both clear 1,000 rushing yards in the same season; Johnson led the team with 1,201 yards.

He clashed several times during the season with veteran head coach Mike Bellotti, earning a suspension for the first quarter of a November loss to the California Golden Bears for "not following team rules."

After the end of the season, he missed a number of workouts. Bellotti suspended him indefinitely on February 10 for "failure to fulfill team obligations."

Blount responded fairly well to the suspension, improving his attendance in both academic and athletic pursuits. He was reinstated by newly appointed head coach Chip Kelly in March. He attended some, but not all, voluntary workouts during the off-season, but was praised for an improved attitude by fellow members of the football program. He arrived at training camp in better physical shape than in 2008. At 243 pounds (110 kg), he was somewhat above his optimal weight, but was slimming down, and aiming for a 2,000 yard season. Blount was named to the watchlists for the Walter Camp Award and the Doak Walker Award for the 2009 season.

==== Boise State incident ====
The Ducks opened their 2009 season on September 3 with a 19–8 loss to the Boise State Broncos in Boise. Blount ended the game with negative yardage (−5) on eight carries. Blount had been interviewed by a Sports Illustrated reporter earlier in the summer and was asked about the excessive late hits in the 2008 game in Eugene between Oregon and Boise State. He had been quoted that because of the way Boise State beat Oregon in Eugene, they, "owed them an ass-whoopin'." In the 2008 game, Oregon quarterback Jeremiah Masoli was forced to leave the game after taking a helmet to the chin on a late hit by a Boise State defender. Oregon lost that game, but the late hits were a topic of discussion as the teams prepared for the season opener against each other. Shortly after the 2009 game's end, Boise State defensive player Byron Hout came up to Blount, slapped Blount's shoulder pad and said, "How's that for an ass-whoopin'?" Blount punched Hout, knocking him to the ground. Blount then hit teammate Garrett Embry, who was attempting to restrain him, in the helmet.

As he was escorted to the locker room, Blount confronted Boise State fans who were jeering at him after seeing the video replay. Blount says that one Boise State fan brandished a chair at him and another punched him. Two police officers and Oregon assistant coach Scott Frost restrained Blount and escorted him into the locker room. Video of the incident spread rapidly on the Internet.

Blount apologized after the incident saying, "I just apologize to everybody that was watching this — ESPN, national TV — I just apologize to all of our fans, all the Boise fans. It was just something that I shouldn't have done. I lost my head, and I shouldn't have taken it that far."

Suspension

Oregon coach Chip Kelly suspended Blount for the rest of the 2009 season. According to the Associated Press, "On Friday [Kelly] told a sobbing Blount of his decision: That punch would cost Blount the season, and ultimately his career with the Ducks. 'He understands that his actions are unacceptable. We will not put up with that.' Kelly said." Blount was not dismissed from the team, however, and would be permitted to attend practice and retain his scholarship.

Kelly consulted with Oregon officials in advance of Blount's suspension. Afterward, the Pac-10 expressed support for the suspension. Kelly stated that he made his judgment based on the entire event and had not theorized how it would have changed had only certain parts of the incident occurred.

Following the announcement of Blount's punishment, a number of sports writers and analysts questioned whether or not suspension for the entire season was excessive. Wrote analyst Tom Dienhart: "But did Blount's punishment (banned from games the rest of the season) fit the crime? Blount should have been benched for three to five games, giving him a break for being in an emotional spot after being provoked by Hout."

Blount called Hout and Boise State coach Chris Petersen to apologize on September 5. Kelly participated in the calls. Hout was not suspended for his taunting, though Petersen stated that he did receive disciplinary action. Petersen accepted the apology as sincere, and expressed the wish that Blount would be able to go on playing football, and that many parties would learn from the experience.

Blount was given the opportunity to continue practicing with the team but was not at the first practice due to unspecified obligations. However, Blount was on the sidelines at practice the following day and began practice with the scout team a week later.

Reinstatement

On October 1, an apology letter from Blount was published in the Oregon school newspaper the Oregon Daily Emerald. Later that day, the Oregon Athletic Department released a statement indicating that a plan that could reinstate Blount to the team was under consideration. The next day, head coach Chip Kelly announced that if Blount meets certain guidelines, he could return for the November 7 game against the Stanford Cardinal. Pac-10 commissioner Larry Scott responded that the conference alone had the power to reinstate Blount and would take Oregon's appeal under consideration if it occurred.

Blount was not reinstated in time for the Stanford game, but two days after the Ducks' loss to Stanford, the Ducks requested, and the Pac-10 approved, Blount's reinstatement for the Ducks' November 14 game against Arizona State. Blount released a statement thanking head coach Kelly for showing that he "cares enough to offer me this second chance" and that it was up to Blount to "prove to people that their lasting impressions of me are not what they saw in Boise." Blount suited up for the Arizona State and Arizona games, but since his replacement, LaMichael James, was playing so well, Blount did not see any playing time in those games.

In their final game of the season, the Civil War against rival Oregon State, the Ducks trailed by nine points in the third quarter. Blount came into the game for James and several plays later, scored on a 12-yard run to bring the Ducks within two points. Blount ended up rushing for 51 yards in the game and the Ducks would go on to win the game by a score of 37–33 and earn a berth in the 2010 Rose Bowl against Ohio State.

== Professional career ==
Pre-draft measurables
Height	Weight	Arm length	Hand span	40-yard dash	10-yard split	20-yard split	20-yard shuttle	Three-cone drill	Vertical jump	Broad jump	Bench press	Wonderlic
6 ft 0 1/2 in (1.84 m)	241 lb (109 kg)	33 1/2 in (0.85 m)	10 in (0.25 m)	4.59 s	1.61 s	2.56 s	4.49 s	6.85 s	35 in (0.89 m)	9 ft 9 in (2.97 m)	18 reps	16
All values from NFL Combine/Pro Day

=== Tennessee Titans ===
Blount was undrafted in the 2010 NFL draft, but agreed in principle to a free agent contract with the San Francisco 49ers following the draft. However, after a meeting with Tennessee Titans head coach Jeff Fisher, Blount decided to sign as an undrafted free agent with the Titans instead. In August 2010, Blount was involved in another incident in which he threw a punch, this time at teammate defensive end Eric Bakhtiari, a few moments after having his own helmet ripped off in practice. Blount quickly talked to Titans head coach Jeff Fisher before leaving the field. "He apologized, and I said he didn't have to apologize," Fisher said. "It's football. It's training camp. . . . His past is his past. Is that the first punch you've seen in camp this year? No. I'm not disappointed whatsoever. I have great confidence in the young man that he learned from his mistake, and he's very competitive. That's why we brought him in here is to watch him run the football like that." Blount survived the final roster cut and was placed on the Titans' 53-man roster. Blount was then waived by the team on September 5, 2010, to make room for veteran linebackers Tim Shaw (Chicago Bears) and Patrick Bailey (Pittsburgh Steelers). Titans sources indicated that Blount would be signed to the rookie practice squad if he cleared waivers, which he did not.

=== Tampa Bay Buccaneers ===
On September 6, 2010, Blount was claimed off of waivers by the Tampa Bay Buccaneers. He played in his first regular-season NFL game in a Week 3 home loss, 38–13, to the Pittsburgh Steelers, gaining 27 yards on six rushes and scoring one touchdown. On October 31, 2010, Blount recorded his breakout game as a Tampa Bay Buccaneer. He accumulated 120 rushing yards and two rushing touchdowns on 22 carries, and nine receiving yards in the Buccaneers' 38–35 victory against the Arizona Cardinals. Highlighting the performance was a late game 43-yard run in which Blount hurdled approaching safety Kerry Rhodes. In Week 16, against the Seattle Seahawks, he rushed for a then career-high 164 yards in the 38–15 victory. At the end of his rookie season, Blount had played in 13 games and accumulated 1,007 rushing yards, which was the most by a rookie in the 2010 NFL season. Blount became the second undrafted running back in NFL history to accumulate 1,000 yards in his rookie year, joining Dominic Rhodes, who accomplished the feat for the Indianapolis Colts in 2001. He earned a spot on the NFL All-Rookie Team.

Blount started off the 2011 season with only five carries for 15 rushing yards against the Detroit Lions. The next week, Blount reestablished his strong running ability with 13 carries for 71 yards and two touchdowns against the Minnesota Vikings. This includes the game-winning touchdown with 30 seconds left to play. In a Week 5 against the 49ers, Blount injured his knee after accumulating only 15 yards rushing and was forced to miss Weeks 6 and 7. Blount would ultimately return for the matchup with the New Orleans Saints. On November 20, 2011, Blount broke free from eight Packers tacklers and scored on a 54-yard touchdown run.

Blount remained on the Buccaneers for the 2012 season. His best game of the season came against the Kansas City Chiefs on October 14 with 58 rushing yards and a touchdown. He did not have much as action with 41 carries for 151 rushing yards and two rushing touchdowns in the 2012 season.

=== New England Patriots (first stint) ===
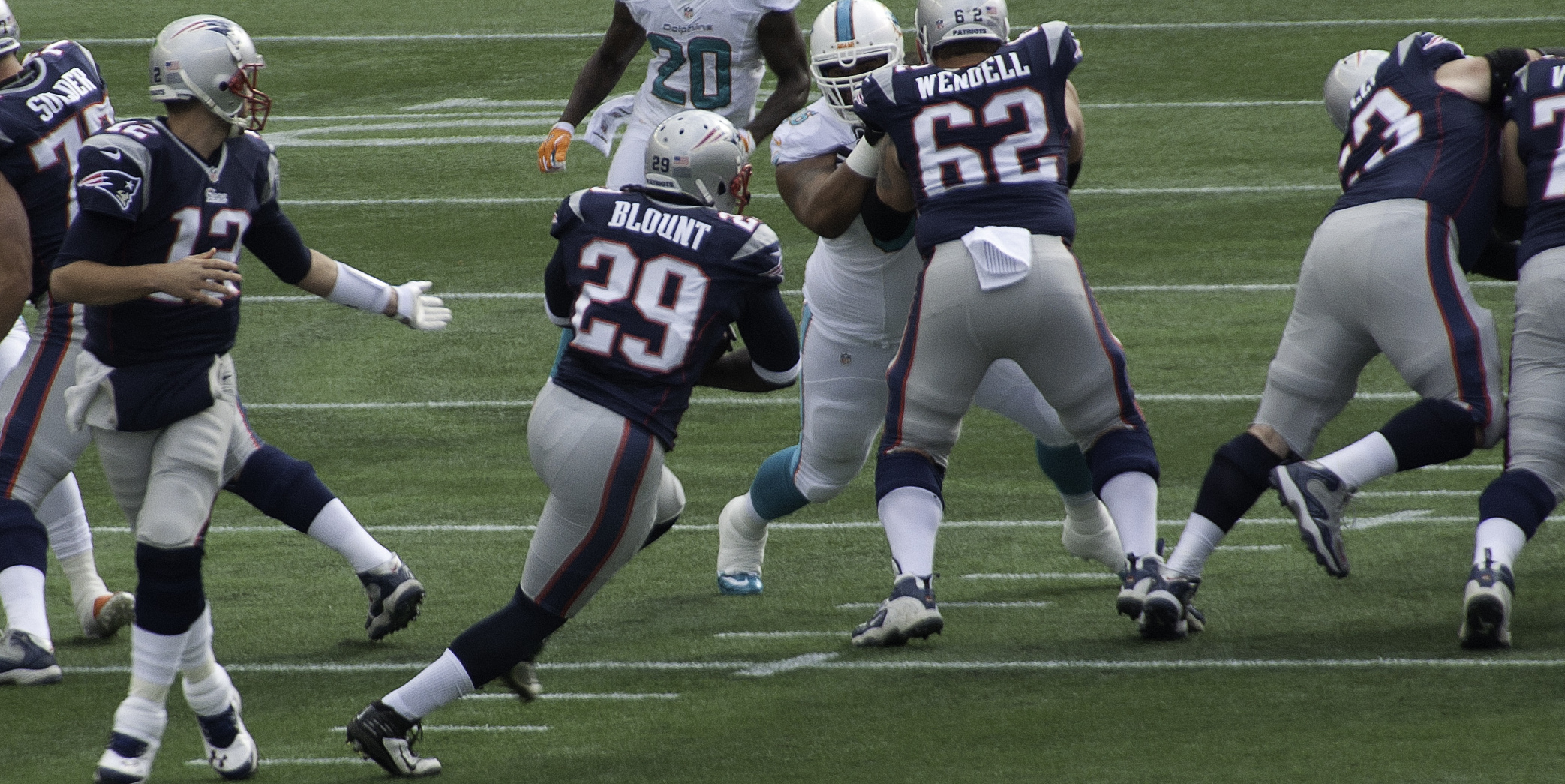
Taking a handoff from Tom Brady in 2013.

On April 27, 2013, Blount was traded to the New England Patriots for running back Jeff Demps and a seventh-round selection (229th overall) in the 2013 NFL draft.

On September 8, Blount made his Patriots debut against the Buffalo Bills in the season opener. In Week 4, against the Atlanta Falcons, he had 64 rushing yards and his first touchdown as a Patriot. In Week 15, against the Baltimore Ravens, he had 76 rushing yards and two rushing touchdowns in the 41–7 victory. On December 29, he led the Patriots to a playoff bye with a win over the Buffalo Bills in their second divisional matchup by rushing for a career-high 189 yards on 24 carries scoring two touchdowns and returning two kickoffs for 145 yards with a long of 83 yards. Blount set a franchise record for all-purpose yards with 334 yards. His performance earned him NFL Ground Player of the Week honors. Blount finished the season with 772 rushing yards and a career-high seven touchdowns. The Patriots made the playoffs and had a first round bye. In the Divisional Round against the Indianapolis Colts, he had 166 rushing yards and four rushing touchdowns in the 43–22 victory. In the AFC Championship against the Denver Broncos, he was limited to six yards on five carries in the 26–16 loss.

=== Pittsburgh Steelers ===
On March 28, 2014, Blount signed a two-year contract with the Steelers.

On August 20, 2014, Blount and fellow Steeler running back Le'Veon Bell were out cruising in Bell's Camaro with a female passenger, when traffic officer Sean Stafiej pulled over the Camaro operated by Bell around 1:30 p.m. after Stafiej, who was on a motorcycle, noticed a strong odor of marijuana coming from the vehicle. Stafiej found a 20 gram bag of marijuana inside the car. Bell, Blount, and a female passenger all claimed ownership of the marijuana according to police. Bell, 22, was taken to a hospital to have blood drawn Both Blount and Bell were arrested for marijuana possession. In addition, Bell also received a DUI.

On September 7, 2014, Blount scored his first touchdown as a Steeler against the Cleveland Browns. On September 21, 2014, Blount ran for 118 yards on 10 carries and a touchdown against the Carolina Panthers. This game was the only game of the season with 100-plus yards. On November 9, 2014, Blount returned a kick-off for 21 yards and had three carries for 8 yards when he was brought on the field to punch it in on first-&-goal from the one-yard-line, down 20–6 against the New York Jets, halfway through the fourth quarter. On first down, Blount was sent to carry the ball off the left guard for no gain. The Steelers ran the very same play on second down, but the Jets were expecting it and already in the backfield before Blount even got the ball, with Blount's attempt to shake loose going terribly wrong (losing 8 yards) and leaving the Steelers facing third-&-goal from the nine-yard-line. That play marked the final time Blount would touch the ball as a Steeler. On November 17, 2014, Blount left the game against the Titans, after not getting a single touch all day for the first time all season, leaving the field before the game ended (while Pittsburgh was in the "victory formation"). Blount was subsequently released by the Steelers and finished his short-term Steelers tenure with 266 yards and two touchdowns.

=== New England Patriots (second stint) ===
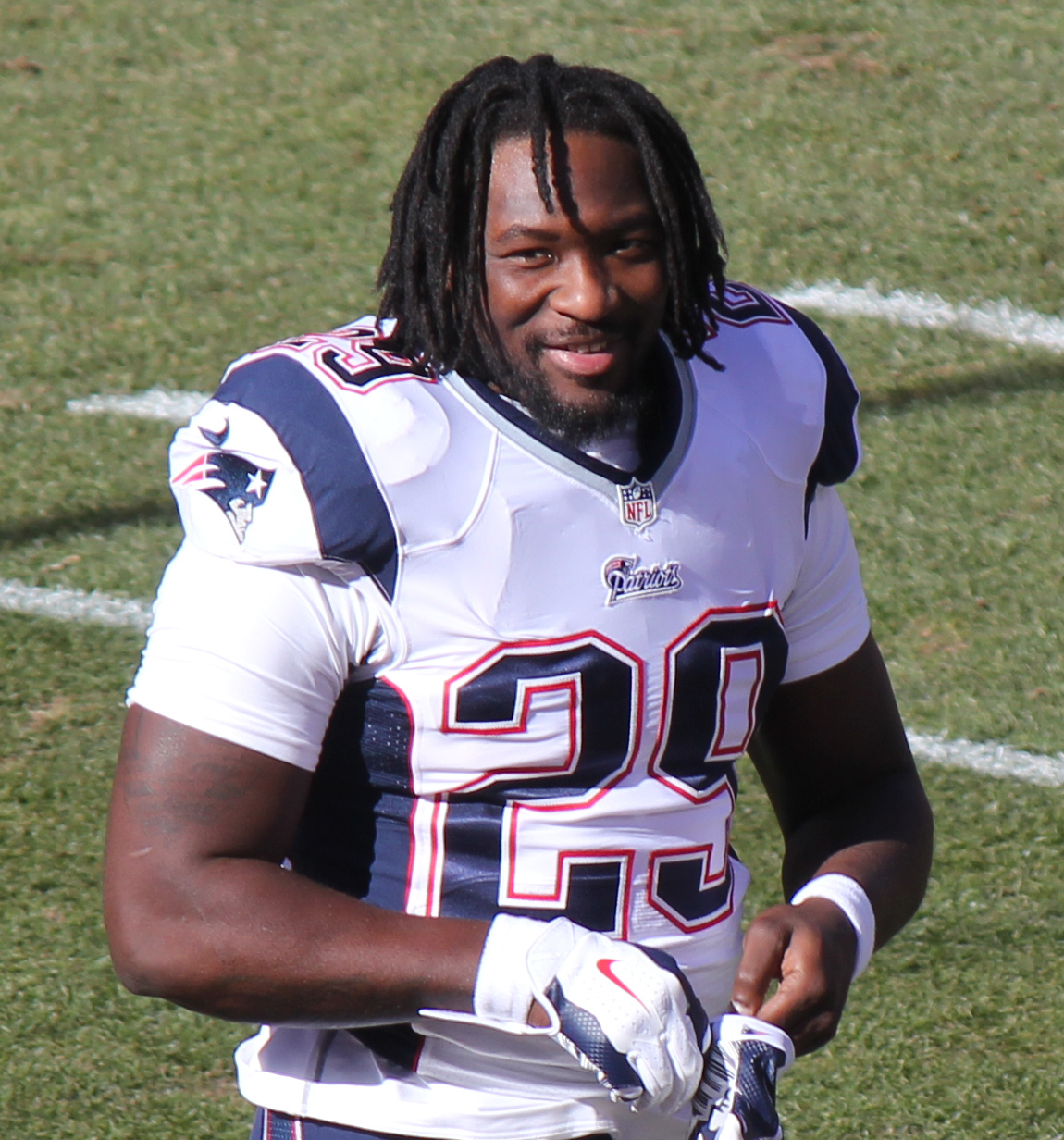
Blount with the New England Patriots in 2014

==== 2014 season ====
On November 20, 2014, after clearing waivers, Blount signed a two-year deal with the Patriots.

On November 23, 2014, Blount's first game back with New England concluded in 78 yards on 12 carries and two touchdowns in a 34–9 victory over the Detroit Lions. In his second season with Patriots, Blount rushed 60 times for 281 yards and three touchdowns in five games.

The Patriots made the playoffs and had a first round bye. Blount had a limited role in the Divisional Round victory over the Baltimore Ravens. In the AFC Championship Game, Blount had 30 carries for 148 rushing yards and three touchdowns, as New England routed the Colts 45–7. In doing so, he became the New England Patriots' franchise leader in postseason rushing touchdowns with seven. In Super Bowl XLIX, Blount rushed 14 times for 40 yards as the Patriots defeated the Seahawks by a score of 28–24.

==== 2015 season ====
On April 7, 2015, it was announced that Blount had been suspended for the first game of the 2015 season due to a violation of the league's substance abuse policy during his stint with the Steelers.

On September 27, 2015, Blount scored a career-high three rushing touchdowns on 18 carries for 78 yards against the Jacksonville Jaguars. On October 18, 2015, Blount ran for 93 yards on 16 carries and a touchdown, as well as catching his first career receiving touchdown against the Colts. On November 8, 2015, Blount ran for a season-high 129 yards on 29 carries and a touchdown against the Washington Redskins.

On December 15, 2015, it was reported that Blount was added to the Patriots' injured/reserved list for the remainder of the season after suffering a left hip injury during the previous game against the Houston Texans. He ended the 2015 season having recorded 165 carries, 703 rushing yards, and six rushing touchdowns in 12 games.

==== 2016 season ====
Blount re-signed with the Patriots on a one-year deal on April 12, 2016.

In the Patriots' season opener against the Cardinals on NBC Sunday Night Football, Blount recorded 70 rushing yards and a touchdown on 22 carries in the 23–21 victory. The following week, he compiled 123 rushing yards on 29 carries and a touchdown in a 31–24 victory over the Miami Dolphins. Blount led the league with 298 rushing yards in the first three games and he would later be named AFC Offensive Player of the Month for September.

On October 23, Blount ran for 127 yards and two touchdowns on 24 carries, en route to a 27–16 Patriots win against the Steelers. It was his eighth rushing touchdown of the season and his first time returning to Pittsburgh since being released by the Steelers in 2014 The following game, Blount ran for his ninth touchdown of the season against the Bills. He led the league with nine rushing touchdowns in Week 8. On November 13, 2016, Blount ran for 69 yards on 21 carries and a season-high and career-high tying three touchdowns against the Seahawks. This brought his total of rushing touchdowns to 12. On December 12, 2016, Blount ran for 72 yards on 18 carries and a touchdown against the Baltimore Ravens. Blount scored his 14th touchdown and eclipsed 1,000 rushing yards on the season during the game. In doing so, Blount tied Ricky Williams's NFL record of longest time span (six years) between seasons with at least 1000 rushing yards (2010–2016). Blount surpassed Curtis Martin's franchise record for rushing touchdowns by scoring his 15th touchdown against the Broncos. In Week 16 and 17, he added three more touchdowns—two against the Jets and one against the Dolphins—to extend his record to 18 touchdowns.

Blount finished the season with 299 carries for 1,161 rushing yards, the eighth highest total in the league, and the most for a Patriots running back since Stevan Ridley's 1,263 rushing yards in 2012. His 18 touchdowns were a league high, making him the first Patriot in franchise history to lead the league in rushing touchdowns. His 18 total touchdowns for the season is tied for second with tight end Rob Gronkowski in Patriots history, and second only to Randy Moss's 23 receiving touchdowns in 2007. The Patriots finished the season 14–2 and earned a first round bye. In the Divisional Round against the Texans, he had 31 rushing yards in the 34–16 victory. In the AFC Championship against the Steelers, he finished with 47 rushing yards and a touchdown in the 36–17 victory to reach Super Bowl LI. Blount fumbled in Falcons' territory in the second quarter when game was scoreless. Blount had 11 carries for a team-high 31 rushing yards. He was ranked 80th by his peers on the NFL Top 100 Players of 2017.

=== Philadelphia Eagles ===
On May 17, 2017, the Philadelphia Eagles signed Blount to a one-year, $1.25 million contract with $400,000 guaranteed. With incentives, Blount could have earned up to $2.80 million in 2017.

On September 10, Blount made his Eagles debut in their season-opening 30–17 victory over division rival Washington in which he had 14 carries for 46 yards and a one-yard receiving touchdown from quarterback Carson Wentz. The touchdown was the second receiving touchdown of Blount's career. In Week 4, against the Los Angeles Chargers, he recorded 136 rushing yards and a 20-yard reception in the 26–24 victory. This season, the Eagles went 13–3 and Blount finished with 766 rushing yards and two touchdowns. In the Divisional Round of the playoffs, Blount had a rushing touchdown against the Atlanta Falcons. The Eagles won 15–10 and advanced to the NFC Championship to play Minnesota. He added another touchdown against the Vikings in the NFC Championship Game, and the Eagles advanced to the Super Bowl for the third time in Blount's career.

In Super Bowl LII, Blount rushed for 90 yards, including a 21-yard touchdown run. The Eagles defeated his former team, the Patriots, 41–33, giving Blount his third Super Bowl championship and the Eagles' first in the history of their franchise. Blount is one of only six players to win back-to-back Super Bowls with different teams along with Ken Norton, Jr., Deion Sanders, LeSean McCoy, former teammate Brandon Browner, and then teammate Chris Long. The latter three, along with Blount, won their second Super Bowl of the pair against the team with which they won their first.

=== Detroit Lions ===
On March 16, 2018, Blount signed a one-year, $4.5 million contract which includes a $1 million signing bonus and $2.5 million in incentives with the Detroit Lions.

During Week 2 against the 49ers, Blount shoved an opposing 49ers player while on the sidelines and was ejected for the first time in his NFL career. In Week 5, against the Green Bay Packers, he recorded his first multi-touchdown game with the Lions in the 31–23 victory. In a Week 12 loss to the Chicago Bears, he had his best output of the season with 88 rushing yards and two rushing touchdowns. Overall, Blount finished the 2018 season with 418 rushing yards and five rushing touchdowns.

=== Retirement ===
Blount announced his retirement from football on December 5, 2020. Even after earning many millions, in February 2025, Blount placed his Super Bowl XLIX ring (from the Patriots' 2014 championship) up for auction through an online auction company.

== Career statistics ==
=== NFL ===
Legend
	Won the Super Bowl
	Led the league
**Bold**	Career high

==== Regular season ====
Year	Team	Games		Rushing					Receiving					Fumbles	
Year	Team	GP	GS	Att	Yds	Avg	Lng	TD	Rec	Yds	Avg	Lng	TD	Fum	Lost
2010	TB	13	7	201	1,007	**5.0**	53	6	5	14	2.8	7	0	4	**3**
2011	TB	14	**14**	184	781	4.2	54	5	**15**	**148**	9.9	**35**	0	**5**	**3**
2012	TB	13	0	41	151	3.7	35	2	1	2	2.0	2	0	0	0
2013	NE	**16**	7	153	772	**5.0**	47	7	2	38	**19.0**	32	0	3	2
2014	PIT	11	0	65	266	4.1	50	2	6	36	6.0	13	0	1	1
2014	NE	5	1	60	281	4.7	34	3	4	18	4.5	11	0	0	0
2015	NE	12	6	165	703	4.3	38	6	6	43	7.2	14	**1**	1	0
2016	NE	**16**	8	**299**	**1,161**	3.9	44	**18**	7	38	5.4	16	0	2	1
2017	PHI	**16**	11	173	766	4.4	**68**	2	8	50	6.3	20	**1**	1	1
2018	DET	**16**	8	154	418	2.7	27	5	10	67	6.7	23	0	2	1
Career		132	62	1,495	6,306	4.2	68	56	64	454	7.1	35	2	19	12

==== Postseason ====
Year	Team	Games		Rushing					Receiving					Fumbles	
Year	Team	GP	GS	Att	Yds	Avg	Lng	TD	Rec	Yds	Avg	Lng	TD	Fum	Lost
2013	NE	2	1	29	172	**5.9**	**73**	**4**	0	0	0	0	0	0	0
2014	NE	**3**	0	**47**	**189**	4.0	22	3	0	0	0	0	0	0	0
2016	NE	**3**	**1**	35	109	3.1	18	1	**1**	**8**	**8.0**	8	0	**1**	**1**
2017	PHI	**3**	**1**	29	130	4.5	36	3	0	0	0	0	0	0	0
Career		11	3	140	600	4.3	73	11	1	8	8.0	8	0	1	1

=== College ===
Year	Team	League	Games		Rushing				Receiving			
Year	Team	League	GP	GS	Att	Yards	Avg	TD	Rec	Yards	Avg	TD
2006	East Mississippi CC	NJCAA	8	—	**189**	**1,250**	6.6	12	**11**	139	12.6	**1**
2007	East Mississippi CC	NJCAA	9	—	178	1,042	5.9	6	8	**144**	**18.0**	**1**
2008	Oregon	NCAA	**13**	0	137	1,002	**7.3**	**17**	2	2	1.0	0
2009	Oregon	NCAA	3	**1**	22	82	3.7	2	2	13	6.5	0
NJCAA career			17	—	367	2,292	6.2	18	19	283	14.9	2
NCAA career			16	1	159	1,084	6.8	19	4	15	3.8	0

== Career highlights ==
- 3× Super Bowl champion (XLIX, LI, LII)
- NFL rushing touchdowns leader (2016)
- PFWA All-Rookie Team (2010)
- Ranked No. 80 in the Top 100 Players of 2017
- Patriots franchise record most rushing touchdowns in a season: 18 (2016)
