= 2010 Rose Bowl =

Postseason college football game

2010 Rose Bowl presented by Citi
- 96th Rose Bowl Game
Ohio State Buckeyes	Oregon Ducks
(10–2)	(10–2)
Big Ten	Pac-10
26	17
Head coach: Jim Tressel	Head coach: Chip Kelly
AP / Coaches / BCS; 8 / 8 / 8	AP / Coaches / BCS; 7 / 7 / 7
	1	2	3	4	Total
Ohio State	10	6	3	7	26
Oregon	0	10	7	0	17
- Date: January 1, 2010
- Season: 2009
- Stadium: Rose Bowl
- Location: Pasadena, California
- MVP: Offensive: Ohio State QB Terrelle Pryor; Defensive: Oregon DE Kenny Rowe
- Favorite: Oregon by 5
- National anthem: University of Oregon Marching Band
- Referee: Scott Novak (Big 12 Conference)
- Halftime show: The Ohio State University Marching Band; University of Oregon Marching Band
- Attendance: 93,963
- Payout: US$18,000,000 per team

United States TV coverage
- Network: ESPN on ABC
- Announcers: Brent Musburger (Play by Play); Kirk Herbstreit (Analyst); Lisa Salters (Sideline)
- Nielsen ratings: 13.2 (24.0 million viewers)

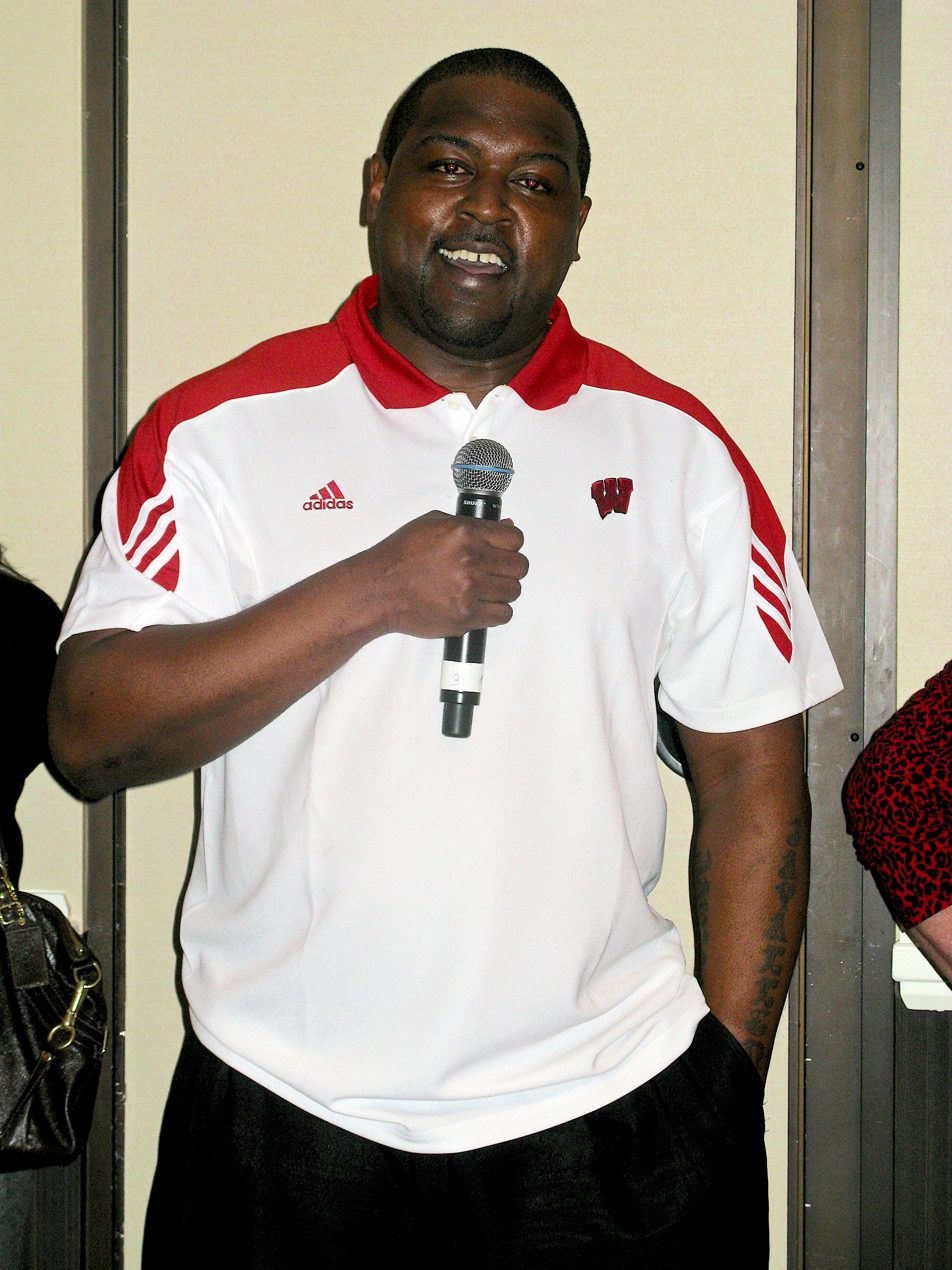
Ron Dayne in 2010

The 2010 Rose Bowl, the 96th edition of the annual game, was a college football bowl game played on Friday, January 1, 2010, at Rose Bowl Stadium in Pasadena, California. It featured the Ohio State Buckeyes against the Oregon Ducks. The Buckeyes won 26–17.

Because of sponsorship by Citi, the first game in the 2010 edition of the Bowl Championship Series was officially titled the Rose Bowl Game presented by Citi. The contest was televised on ABC with a radio broadcast on ESPN Radio and XM Satellite Radio (Mike Tirico, Jon Gruden, and Shelley Smith), which began at 1:30 p.m. (PST) with kickoff at 2:10 p.m. (PST). The game was also broadcast on the Ohio State Sports Network WBNS 97.1 FM and Oregon Sports Network KUGN 590 AM. Ticket prices for all seats in the Rose Bowl were listed at $145.

The Rose Bowl Game was a contractual sell-out, with 64,500 tickets allocated to the participating teams and conferences. The remaining tickets went to the Tournament of Roses members, sponsors, City of Pasadena residents, and the general public.

This was the 22nd and final Rose Bowl televised by ABC. Corporate sibling ESPN took over coverage in 2011.

This game was a separate BCS game from the National Championship Game, which the Pasadena Tournament of Roses also hosted. The 2010 Citi BCS National Championship Game was held on January 7 at 5:00 p.m. (PST).

== Pre-game activities ==
The Pasadena Tournament of Roses Association announced the 2010 Royal Court on Monday, October 12, 2009, and the Rose Queen on Tuesday, October 20, 2009, at the Tournament House. The Queen, Natalie Innocenzi, and the Royal Court presided over the game. Also presiding at the game was Captain Chesley B. "Sully" Sullenberger III who was selected as the 2010 Rose Parade grand marshal, which was announced on Thursday, November 5, 2009.

After the teams' arrival in Southern California, they participated in the traditional Lawry's Beef Bowl in Beverly Hills and the Disney Media Day at Disneyland in nearby Anaheim.

The 20th Anniversary of the Rose Bowl Hall of Fame induction ceremony was held at the Brookside golf club clubhouse on December 30, 2009. It was hosted by the Pasadena Quarterbacks Club, and Keith Jackson was the Master of Ceremonies. The honorees were former Wisconsin head coach Barry Alvarez, former Pac-10 commissioner Tom Hansen, and former Ohio State offensive tackle John Hicks.

The Rose Bowl Game Kickoff Luncheon on December 31, 2009, presented by Trader Joe's, was a celebration of the game by featuring the university coaches, athletes, marching bands and pep squads of the teams participating in the game, and the Rose Queen with her princesses and the 2009 Rose Bowl Game Hall of Fame inductees.

The bands and cheerleaders from both schools participated in the early morning Rose Parade on Colorado Boulevard in Pasadena, California along with the floats from the two conferences.

A salute to the men and women serving America throughout the world was scheduled before kickoff, with a flyover of four F-18 jets. The flyover was performed by pilots of the Fighting Redcocks of Strike Fighter Squadron 22 (VFA-22) from the Naval Air Station at Lemoore, California.

== Teams ==
The teams were formally selected by the football committee of the Tournament of Roses on December 6, 2009. Ohio State represented the Big Ten Conference in the Rose Bowl as the conference's automatic bid after winning their 5th consecutive Big Ten championship by defeating Iowa 27–24 on November 14, 2009. Oregon represented the Pac-10 as the conference's automatic bid after defeating Oregon State 37–33 in the Civil War on December 3, 2009. The pairing of the two conferences in the Rose Bowl is the oldest college football agreement between two major conferences in the United States. Ohio State had previously played in thirteen Rose Bowl Games with a record of 6–7, winning their previous appearance over Arizona State 20–17 in the 1997 Rose Bowl. Oregon had previously played in four Rose Bowl Games with a record of 1–3, being defeated in their previous appearance by Penn State Nittany Lions 38–20 in the 1995 Rose Bowl. In its only Rose Bowl win, Oregon defeated the Penn Quakers 14–0 in the 1917 Rose Bowl.

The two teams had met seven times prior to this game, with the last coming on September 19, 1987, in Columbus, Ohio, where Ohio State defeated Oregon 24–14. This was the second time the two teams faced one another in the Rose Bowl. Ohio State defeated Oregon 10–7 in the 1958 Rose Bowl. Prior to the 2010 game, Ohio State was 7–0 all time against Oregon in football. It was the first time the outright Big Ten champion met the outright Pac-10 champion in the Rose Bowl since the 2004 Rose Bowl between Michigan and Southern California. Ohio State wore its white jerseys on the west sideline while Oregon wore its dark jerseys on the east.

== Game notes ==
Oregon won the coin toss to begin the game and decided to defer to the second half.

Ohio State quarterback Terrelle Pryor was selected the game's offensive Most Valuable Player. His performance included passing for a season-high 266 yards and rushing for 72 yards. Oregon defensive end Kenny Rowe was the game's defensive Most Valuable Player. He recorded 3 sacks, tying a Rose Bowl Record.

The game lasted from 2:11 pm to 5:22 pm PT for a total elapsed time of 3 hours 11 minutes. The officials were Scott Novak (referee), John Mascarello (umpire), George Gusman (linesman), Walt Coleman (line judge), Terry Jones (back judge), Joe Blubaugh (field judge), Eugene Hall (side judge). The game time temperature was 71 deg, wind at 5 mph ESE, on a sunny afternoon.

Following the game in June, Citi decided to end the sponsorship of the Rose Bowl game.

=== Scoring summary ===
Scoring play	Score
1st quarter
OSU – Brandon Saine 13-yard pass from Terrelle Pryor (Aaron Pettrey kick), 11:38	OSU 7–0
OSU – Devin Barclay 19-yard field goal, 0:34	OSU 10–0
2nd quarter
ORE – Morgan Flint 24-yard field goal, 14:24	OSU 10–3
ORE – LeGarrette Blount 3-yard run (Morgan Flint kick), 9:05	10–10
OSU – Devin Barclay 30-yard field goal, 1:05	OSU 13–10
OSU – Aaron Pettrey 45-yard field goal, 0:00	OSU 16–10
3rd quarter
ORE – Jeremiah Masoli 1-yard run (Morgan Flint kick), 11:03	ORE 17–16
OSU – Devin Barclay 38-yard field goal, 6:36	OSU 19–17
4th quarter
OSU – DeVier Posey 17-yard pass from Terrelle Pryor (Aaron Pettrey kick), 7:02	OSU 26–17

=== Statistics ===
Statistics	Ohio State	Oregon
First downs	26	12
Total offense, plays - yards	89-419	53-260
Rushes-yards (net)	51-153	33-179
Passing yards (net)	266	81
Passes, Comp-Att-Int	38-23-1	20-9-1
Time of Possession	41:37	18:23
