= 2009 Oregon Ducks football team =

American college football season

2009 Oregon Ducks football

Pac-10 champion

Rose Bowl, L 17–26 vs. Ohio State
- Conference: Pacific-10 Conference

Ranking
- Coaches: No. 11
- AP: No. 11
- Record: 10–3 (8–1 Pac-10)
- Head coach: Chip Kelly (1st season)
- Offensive coordinator: Mark Helfrich (1st season)
- Offensive scheme: No-huddle spread option
- Defensive coordinator: Nick Aliotti (13th season)
- Base defense: 3–4
- Captain: Game captains
- Home stadium: Autzen Stadium

Uniform

2009 Pacific-10 Conference football standings
	Conf.			Overall
Team	W		L	W		L
No. 11 Oregon $	8	–	1	10	–	3
Arizona	6	–	3	8	–	5
Oregon State	6	–	3	8	–	5
Stanford	6	–	3	8	–	5
No. 22 USC	5	–	4	9	–	4
California	5	–	4	8	–	5
Washington	4	–	5	5	–	7
UCLA	3	–	6	7	–	6
Arizona State	2	–	7	4	–	8
Washington State	0	–	9	1	–	11
$ – BCS representative as conference champion; Rankings from AP Poll

The 2009 Oregon Ducks football team represented the University of Oregon as member of the Pacific-10 Conference the 2009 NCAA Division I FBS football season. The team was led by head coach Chip Kelly in his first season as a head coach at the Division I FBS level. Kelly was only the third Ducks head coach since 1977 and led the Ducks to a Pac-10 championship and was named Pac-10 Coach of the Year. He took over for Mike Bellotti.

The Ducks finished the season 10–3, 8–1 in Pac-10 to claim the Pac-10 championship and earn the conference's automatic Bowl Championship Series (BCS) berth where they were invited to the Rose Bowl, the school's fifth Rose Bowl and first since the 1994 season. They were defeated by Ohio State 26–17.

== Preseason ==
July 29 – Senior Ed Dickson is named to the Mackey Award watchlist, given out to the nation's best tight end.

August 4 – Junior Jeremiah Masoli is named to the watch list for the Davey O'Brien Award.

August 8 – Senior LeGarrette Blount is named to the watch list for the Walter Camp Award.

=== Pre-season departures ===
Quarterback and wide receiver Chris Harper, quarterback Justin Roper, and wide receiver Aaron Pflugrad all decided to transfer from the team before the 2009 season.

=== Recruiting ===
College recruiting
Name	Hometown	School	Height	Weight	40^{‡}	Commit date
Cliff Harris (cornerback); CB	Fresno, CA	Edison HS	6 ft 0 in (1.83 m)	168 lb (76 kg)	4.5	Jan 24, 2009
Cliff Harris (cornerback); CB	Recruit ratings: Scout: Rivals: (81)https://en.wikipedia.org/wiki/Cliff_Harris_(cornerback)					
Diante Jackson; WR	Walnut Creek, CA	Las Lomas HS	6 ft 2 in (1.88 m)	194 lb (88 kg)	4.6	Feb 4, 2009
Diante Jackson; WR	Recruit ratings: Scout: Rivals: (77)					
Tyrece Gaines; WR	El Dorado, KS	Butler County CC	6 ft 2 in (1.88 m)	215 lb (98 kg)	4.4	Mar 16, 2009
Tyrece Gaines; WR	Recruit ratings: Scout: Rivals: (–)					
Bryson Littlejohn; LB	Rocklin, CA	Sierra CC	6 ft 2 in (1.88 m)	235 lb (107 kg)	4.5	Jan 12, 2009
Bryson Littlejohn; LB	Recruit ratings: Scout: Rivals: (–)					
Boseko Lokombo; OLB	Abbotsford, BC	W J Mouat Secondary	6 ft 3 in (1.91 m)	216 lb (98 kg)	4.6	Dec 24, 2008
Boseko Lokombo; OLB	Recruit ratings: Scout: Rivals: (77)					
Michael Clay; OLB	San Jose, CA	Bellarmine College Prep School	6 ft 0 in (1.83 m)	213 lb (97 kg)	4.8	Jan 13, 2009
Michael Clay; OLB	Recruit ratings: Scout: Rivals: (74)					
Mike Bowlin; K	Aliso Viejo, CA	Aliso Niguel HS	6 ft 2 in (1.88 m)	185 lb (84 kg)	NA	Jul 18, 2008
Mike Bowlin; K	Recruit ratings: Scout: Rivals: (79)					
Taylor Hart; DE	Tualatin, OR	Tualatin HS	6 ft 6 in (1.98 m)	245 lb (111 kg)	4.7	Apr 7, 2008
Taylor Hart; DE	Recruit ratings: Scout: Rivals: (79)					
Jackson Rice; P	Moraga, CA	Campolindo HS	6 ft 2 in (1.88 m)	195 lb (88 kg)	NA	Jul 29, 2008
Jackson Rice; P	Recruit ratings: Scout: Rivals: (79)					
Everett Benyard; OT	San Diego, CA	Cathedral Catholic HS	6 ft 7 in (2.01 m)	320 lb (150 kg)	5.5	Oct 16, 2008
Everett Benyard; OT	Recruit ratings: Scout: Rivals: (77)					
Anthony Anderson; DE	La Mesa, CA	Helix HS	6 ft 4 in (1.93 m)	222 lb (101 kg)	4.8	Jun 17, 2008
Anthony Anderson; DE	Recruit ratings: Scout: Rivals: (75)					
Karrington Armstrong; DT	Reno, NV	McQueen HS	6 ft 2 in (1.88 m)	293 lb (133 kg)	5.0	Sep 21, 2008
Karrington Armstrong; DT	Recruit ratings: Scout: Rivals: (75)					
Brian Jackson; CB	Hoover, AL	Hoover HS	5 ft 10 in (1.78 m)	188 lb (85 kg)	4.6	Jan 21, 2009
Brian Jackson; CB	Recruit ratings: Scout: Rivals: (74)					
Avery Patterson; CB	Pittsburg, CA	Pittsburg Senior HS	5 ft 9 in (1.75 m)	165 lb (75 kg)	4.4	Aug 16, 2008
Avery Patterson; CB	Recruit ratings: Scout: Rivals: (74)					
Trevor Fox; OG	Temecula, CA	Chaparral HS	6 ft 4 in (1.93 m)	294 lb (133 kg)	NA	Jun 11, 2008
Trevor Fox; OG	Recruit ratings: Scout: Rivals: (68)					
Zac Clark; DE	El Dorado, KS	Butler County CC	6 ft 3 in (1.91 m)	250 lb (110 kg)	4.8	Dec 15, 2008
Zac Clark; DE	Recruit ratings: Scout: Rivals: (–)					
Andrew Iupati; DT	Huntington Beach, CA	Golden West CC	6 ft 1 in (1.85 m)	293 lb (133 kg)	NA	Nov 11, 2008
Andrew Iupati; DT	Recruit ratings: Scout: Rivals: (–)					
Terrance Montgomery; DT	Reedley, CA	Reedley CC	6 ft 2 in (1.88 m)	290 lb (130 kg)	4.9	Aug 4, 2008
Terrance Montgomery; DT	Recruit ratings: Scout: Rivals: (–)					
Jamaal Burrell; OG	Compton, CA	Dominguez HS	6 ft 4 in (1.93 m)	262 lb (119 kg)	5.3	Jan 21, 2009
Jamaal Burrell; OG	Recruit ratings: Scout: Rivals: (76)					
Justin Brown; DT	Compton, CA	Compton HS	6 ft 2 in (1.88 m)	260 lb (120 kg)	4.9	Feb 2, 2009
Justin Brown; DT	Recruit ratings: Scout: Rivals: (71)					
Lavasier Tuinei; WR	Huntington Beach, CA	Golden West CC	6 ft 6 in (1.98 m)	196 lb (89 kg)	4.5	Nov 19, 2008
Lavasier Tuinei; WR	Recruit ratings: Scout: Rivals: (–)					
Braxton Lane; WR	Tyrone, GA	Sandy Creek HS	5 ft 10 in (1.78 m)	189 lb (86 kg)	4.4	Feb 1, 2009
Braxton Lane; WR	Recruit ratings: Scout: Rivals: (77)					
Keaton Arden; DE	Piedmont, CA	Piedmont HS	6 ft 5 in (1.96 m)	220 lb (100 kg)	NA	Jan 19, 2009
Keaton Arden; DE	Recruit ratings: Scout: Rivals: (40)					
Nick Cole; WR	Concord, CA	Clayton Valley HS	6 ft 3 in (1.91 m)	185 lb (84 kg)	NA	Feb 1, 2009
Nick Cole; WR	Recruit ratings: Scout: Rivals: (40)					
Daryle Hawkins; QB	Omaha, NE	Central HS	6 ft 4 in (1.93 m)	190 lb (86 kg)	4.5	Feb 2, 2009
Daryle Hawkins; QB	Recruit ratings: Scout: Rivals: (40)					
Wade Keliikipi; DT	Waianae, HI	Waianae HS	6 ft 4 in (1.93 m)	280 lb (130 kg)	5.0	Feb 2, 2009
Wade Keliikipi; DT	Recruit ratings: Scout: Rivals: (40)					
Overall recruit ranking: Scout: 26 Rivals: 32
‡ Refers to 40-yard dash; Note: In many cases, Scout, Rivals, 247Sports, On3, and ESPN may conflict in their listings of height, weight and 40 time.; In these cases, the average was taken. ESPN grades are on a 100-point scale.; Sources: "Oregon Football Commitment List 2009". Rivals.; "Oregon College Football Recruiting Commits 2009". Scout.; "Oregon Ducks Commits 2009". ESPN.; "Scout.com Team Recruiting Rankings". Scout.; "2009 Team Ranking". Rivals.com.

== Schedule ==
Date	Time	Opponent	Rank	Site	TV	Result	Attendance	Source
September 3	7:15 p.m.	at No. 14 Boise State*	No. 16	Bronco Stadium; Boise, ID	ESPN	L 8–19	34,127	
September 12	7:15 p.m.	Purdue*		Autzen Stadium; Eugene, OR	FSN	W 38–36	57,772	
September 19	12:30 p.m.	No. 18 Utah*		Autzen Stadium; Eugene, OR	ESPN	W 31–24	58,017	
September 26	12:30 p.m.	No. 6 California		Autzen Stadium; Eugene, OR	ABC/ESPN	W 42–3	58,975	
October 3	6:15 p.m.	Washington State	No. 16	Autzen Stadium; Eugene, OR	OSN	W 52–6	57,378	
October 10	12:30 p.m.	at UCLA	No. 13	Rose Bowl; Pasadena, CA	ABC	W 24–10	77,819	
October 24	12:30 p.m.	at Washington	No. 11	Husky Stadium; Seattle, WA (rivalry)	ABC	W 43–19	67,809	
October 31	5:00 p.m.	No. 5 USC	No. 10	Autzen Stadium; Eugene, OR (rivalry, College GameDay)	ABC	W 47–20	59,592	
November 7	12:30 p.m.	at Stanford	No. 8	Stanford Stadium; Stanford, CA (rivalry)	FSN	L 42–51	43,924	
November 14	7:20 p.m.	Arizona State^{†}	No. 13	Autzen Stadium; Eugene, OR	ESPN	W 44–21	58,475	
November 21	5:00 p.m.	at Arizona	No. 11	Arizona Stadium; Tucson, AZ (College GameDay)	ABC	W 44–41 ^{2OT}	57,863	
December 3	6:00 p.m.	No. 16 Oregon State	No. 7	Autzen Stadium; Eugene, OR (Civil War)	ESPN	W 37–33	59,597	
January 1, 2010	2:10 p.m.	vs. No. 8 Ohio State*	No. 7	Rose Bowl; Pasadena, CA (Rose Bowl, College GameDay)	ABC	L 17–26	93,963	
*Non-conference game; ^{†}Homecoming; Rankings from AP Poll and BCS Rankings after October 18 released prior to game; All times are in Pacific time

== Game summaries ==
=== Boise State ===
	1	2	3	4	Total
#16 Ducks	0	0	8	0	8
#14 Broncos	0	13	6	0	19

Uniform combination: white helmet, white jerseys, white pants

Oregon's offense was completely shut down in the first half and was unable to gain a single first down. They allowed the Broncos to get into their red zone multiple times, but Oregon's defense held them twice. Both times resulted in Boise State attempting field goals after having a first and goal situation. Both field goals in the first quarter were missed by kicker Kyle Brotzman (29 and 47). In the second quarter, the Broncos scored on a TD pass from quarterback Kellen Moore to wide receiver Austin Pettis. Michael Choate ran in the two-point conversion. Billy Winn added to Boise State's first half score by tackling running back LeGarrette Blount for a safety. At the end of the first half, Kyle Brotzman booted in a 45-yard field goal to make the score 13–0. A low-scoring second half did not stop the Ducks from scoring a touchdown along with a two-point conversion. The rest of the game was back and forth until the clock expired, Boise State winning by 11.

After the game, Blount, who earlier in the week was quoted as saying, "We owe that team an ass-whuppin," punched Bronco DE Byron Hout in the chin after Hout had taunted him in front of Boise State head coach Chris Petersen. Blount then went after fans in the front row of the south end zone before being restrained and escorted off the field by security, police, and Oregon coaches. The next day, Oregon suspended Blount for the rest of the season, seemingly ending his career. However, in October, Kelly announced that Blount could return as early as November provided he meets certain academic and behavioral benchmarks.

=== Purdue ===
Team	1	2	3	4	Total
Purdue	7	10	7	12	36
• Oregon	10	7	14	7	38

- Date: September 12
- Location: Autzen Stadium, Eugene, OR
- Game start: 10:15 p.m. EST

Scoring summary
1	10:19	ORE	Morgan Flint 28-yard field goal	ORE 3–0
1	8:17	PUR	Jaycen Taylor 5-yard run (Carson Wiggs kick)	PUR 7–3
1	6:10	ORE	Andre Crenshaw 2-yard run (Morgan Flint kick)	ORE 10–7
2	14:30	PUR	Ralph Bolden 19-yard run (Carson Wiggs kick)	PUR 14–10
2	4:04	ORE	Walter Thurmond III 18-yard interception return (Morgan Flint kick)	ORE 17–14
2	0:00	PUR	Carson Wiggs 23-yard field goal	Tied 17–17
3	8:24	PUR	Ralph Bolden 1-yard run (Carson Wiggs kick)	PUR 24–17
3	5:06	ORE	Bryan Littlejohn 28-yard fumble return (Morgan Flint kick)	Tied 24–24
3	1:51	ORE	Jeremiah Masoli 15-yard run (Morgan Flint kick)	ORE 31–24
4	13:46	PUR	Ralph Bolden 22-yard pass from Joey Elliot (kick blocked)	ORE 31–30
4	6:42	ORE	Kenjon Barner 21-yard run (Morgan Flint kick)	ORE 38–30
4	1:01	PUR	Aaron Valentin 15-yard pass from Keith Smith (pass failed)	ORE 38–36

Uniform combination: green helmets, green jerseys, green pants

The Ducks evened their 2009 record at 1–1 with a thrilling 38–36 win over Purdue in their first visit to Eugene. Jeremiah Masoli rushed for 84 yards and a touchdown and LaMichael James rushed for 56 yards. Walter Thurmond III returned an interception for a touchdown in the first half and Javes Lewis returned a fumble for a touchdown in the third quarter. With a minute and one second left to play Purdue failed on a two-point conversion that would have tied the game. Oregon recovered the onsides kick attempt and ran out the clock. Jamere Holland had 72 yards on 4 receptions but dropped a sure touchdown pass in the fourth quarter.

=== Utah ===
#18 Utah at Oregon

Team	1	2	3	4	Total
Utah	7	0	17	0	24
• Oregon	14	7	7	3	31

- Date: September 19
- Location: Autzen Stadium, Eugene, OR
- Game start: 3:30 p.m. EST

Scoring summary
1	12:46	ORE	Walter Thurmond III 78-yard punt return (Morgan Flint kick)	ORE 7–0
1	6:34	UTAH	Terrance Cain 19-yard run (Joe Phillips kick)	Tied 7–7
1	0:57	ORE	LaMichael James 3-yard run (Morgan Flint kick)	ORE 14–7
2	4:39	ORE	Jeremiah Masoli 22-yard run (Morgan Flint kick)	ORE 21–7
3	11:20	UTAH	Joe Phillips 22-yard field goal	ORE 21–10
3	8:34	ORE	Jeremiah Masoli 4-yard run (Morgan Flint kick)	ORE 28–10
3	4:03	UTAH	Jereme Brooks 22-yard pass from Terrance Cain (Joe Phillips kick)	ORE 28–17
3	3:46	UTAH	Robert Johnson 28-yard fumble return (Joe Phillips kick)	ORE 28–24
4	3:30	ORE	Morgan Flint 31-yard field goal	ORE 31–24

Uniform combination: white helmet, green jerseys, silver pants

Utah brought the Nation's longest winning streak of 16 into Autzen Stadium this year. This was the first meeting between the schools since a 17–13 Utah win at Salt Lake City in 2003. The Utes last trek to Autzen Stadium was in early September 2001, when Joey Harrington and the Ducks handled Utah 24–10 on their way to an 11–1 record and No. 2 in the Nation finish.

=== California ===
	1	2	3	4	Total
#6 Golden Bears	3	0	0	0	3
Ducks	3	22	14	3	42

Uniform combination: throwback uniforms, yellow helmet, green jerseys, yellow pants

Cal has run off three in a row against the Ducks, more than any other Pac-10 school against Oregon. The Golden Bears streak is their longest versus Oregon since the 1970s. Cal won a waterlogged game at Berkeley last year, 26–16.

The Oregon Ducks quarterback Jeremiah Masoli struggled in previous games but had a major breakthrough against Cal, throwing 253 yards with 21 completions out of 25 attempts, three for touchdowns. Oregon tight end Ed Dickson had a career day with 11 catches for 148 yards and three touchdowns. The Oregon defense played very well, holding Jahvid Best who tied a Pac-10 record for rushing touchdowns the week prior, to just 55 yards on 16 carries. Before the game, Best was quoted as saying Autzen Stadium was the only venue where the crowd noise troubled him.

The Ducks had a rough start to the game when Walter Thurmond fumbled the opening kickoff reception. Thurmond was hit in the knee on the return and was later diagnosed with a torn ACL and ended up missing the rest of the season. Cal took possession and, on a drive that went for negative eight yards, scored a field goal, their only points in the game. The two teams went back and forth on several miscues. In the first quarter on the Ducks' first scoring drive, running back LaMichael James fumbled the ball and was picked up by Cal's defensive back Josh Hill. During his run back, Hill fumbled the ball again which was recovered by Oregon. In the second quarter, Cal recovered a fumble by Oregon, only to fumble the ball back on the very next play. Later that quarter, Oregon punter Jackson Rice kicked the ball off the side of his foot for a 5-yard punt. After a quick three-and-out by Cal, Bryan Anger, Cal's punter, booted the ball off the side of his foot for another 5-yard punt. Masoli's first touchdown pass of the season occurred in the first few seconds of the second quarter, a 26-yard completion to Ed Dickson.

Since Cal's first field goal, the Ducks went on to score 42 unanswered points to win the game. It was Cal's worst loss with Jeff Tedford as the head coach.

=== Washington State ===
	1	2	3	4	Total
Cougars	0	0	6	0	6
#16 Ducks	21	21	3	7	52

Uniform combination: black helmet, yellow jersey, black pants

Oregon has won two in a row, and four of the last five against Washington State. The last two games have resulted in 63–14 and 53–7 victories by the Ducks. The Cougars have not won at Autzen since 2003 when they defeated Oregon 55–16.

=== UCLA ===
	1	2	3	4	Total
#13 Ducks	0	0	21	3	24
Bruins	0	3	7	0	10

Uniform combination: green helmet, white jersey, green pants

Oregon won last year's match-up with UCLA 31–21 in Eugene. The Ducks' last trip to the Rose Bowl in 2007 was a humbling experience, as they were shut out for the first time since 1985 by a score of 16–0. That game, however, was played the week after they had lost star QB Dennis Dixon to injury for the season. At game time, current Bruins head coach Rick Neuheisel was 4–2 against the Ducks going back to the days he coached the Colorado Buffaloes and the Washington Huskies. Since the first game in 1928, UCLA was leading the series 39–23.

With a solid performance in the first half and taking a field goal lead into the locker room, the Bruins gave up three quick touchdowns within few minutes of the third quarter to give the Ducks their fifth win of the season. The Ducks scored on Kenjon Barner's 100-yard kickoff return, on Talmadge Jackson's 31-yard interception, and on Nate Costa's 20-yard pass to Jeff Maehl, which was resulted from a UCLA fumble.

The Bruins scored their only touchdown when Akeem Ayers intercepted a Costa pass in the back of the Rose Bowl north end zone by keeping his feet in bound. Kai Forbath kicked a 52-yard field goal to give UCLA the early lead. Oregon’s Rob Beard attempted a 51-yard field goal, which was blocked by Jerzy Siewierski. Mogan Flint kicked a 33-yard field goals for the Ducks in the fourth quarter.

=== Washington ===
	1	2	3	4	Total
#12 Ducks	0	15	21	7	43
Huskies	3	3	0	13	19

Oregon has won a school record five in a row over their hated rivals to the north, all by 20 or more points. Washington's last win over the Ducks came at Husky Stadium in 2003.

Uniform combination: black helmet, white jersey with silver numbers, black pants

After Erik Folk's 33-yard field goal in the first quarter for Washington, Oregon blocked a punt and recovered the ball in the end zone in the second quarter to give the Ducks their first lead. Javes Lewis intercepted Jake Locker's pass in the end zone to give the ball back to Oregon, which resulted in Jeremiah Masoli's 1-yard touchdown. With a second left, Folk kicked a 48-yard field goal to end the half, which was aided by a personal foul on Oregon.

With good field position at their own 47-yard line, the Ducks scored their third touchdown on Masoli's 3-yard run in the top of the third quarter.

=== USC ===
	1	2	3	4	Total
#4 Trojans	3	14	3	0	20
#10 Ducks	10	14	17	6	47

USC had not won a game in the state of Oregon for the past three years, a streak that the Ducks kept alive. USC beat Oregon in the Los Angeles Coliseum last year, 44–10.

Uniform combination: green helmet, green jersey, black pants

The tenth ranked Ducks handed the Trojans their worst loss since 1997 and Pete Carroll the worst loss in his tenure at USC. Ducks quarterback Jeremiah Masoli passed for 222 yards, and a score, and ran for 164 more, including a touchdown, while LaMichael James ran for 183 yards.

=== Stanford ===
	1	2	3	4	Total
#7 Ducks	7	7	14	14	42
Cardinal	17	14	14	6	51

The Ducks will go for their 8th straight win against Stanford this season. It is their longest current win streak against any Pac-10 school. The seven straight wins also ties the longest stretch of dominance in school history over the Cardinal (1957–63). Oregon came from behind and won last year in Eugene on a last minute touchdown, 35–28. Stanford's last win against Oregon came in Eugene in 2001. That was the Ducks only loss that season, on their way to an 11–1 finish and No. 2 final ranking.

Uniform combination: green helmet, white jersey, white pants

Oregon's undefeated conference season came to an end at Stanford, 51–42. Both teams have five victories in the Pac-10 championship race.

=== Arizona State ===
	1	2	3	4	Total
Sun Devils	0	7	14	0	21
#14 Ducks	14	17	7	6	44

Oregon has won four straight over the Sun Devils by an average of 23.8 ppg, including last year's 54–20 win in Tempe.

Uniform combination: black helmet, black jersey, black pants

=== Arizona ===
	1	2	3	4	OT	2OT	Total
#11 Ducks	7	7	0	17	7	6	44
Wildcats	0	10	7	14	7	3	41

Uniform combination: green helmet, white jersey with silver numbers, black pants

The previous trip the Ducks took to Tucson in 2007 was a crushing one as the Ducks saw their BCS National Championship Game hopes fade as their star quarterback Dennis Dixon tore his ACL in the first half of the game. The 2009 game was also important, as it involved the only two teams that week in the Pac-10 who were able to control their path to earn an outright Pac-10 Championship.

It was a hotly contested game as neither team led by more than 10 points after Arizona's first touchdown in the second quarter. Ducks quarterback Jeremiah Masoli started with a sluggish game with two recovered fumbles and an interception to set up Arizona's first touchdown. Late in the game, however, he led the Ducks to a narrow victory with two key touchdown passes and a rushing touchdown of his own. After Arizona scored a touchdown in the only score of the third quarter to put them up by 3, the game turned into a frantic sprint with numerous close calls. Morgan Flint attempted a 43-yard field goal for the Ducks that bounced in after hitting the crossbar, tying the game. With three minutes left in the game and Arizona ahead by a touchdown, Talmadge Jackson intercepted Arizona quarterback Nick Foles's pass in the end zone on a 3rd and 16 play at Oregon's 40-yard line. As Oregon drove down the field in the remaining minutes, the student section poured into the Arizona sideline as they prepared to rush the field. However, the drive ended with a touchdown pass from Masoli to Dickson. The Ducks tied the game as Oregon backup quarterback Nate Costa corralled an errant snap for the extra point kicked by Flint. The Arizona student section made their way back to the stands as overtime began. The two teams traded a pair of touchdowns in the first overtime but in the second overtime, Arizona settled for a field goal and Oregon scored a touchdown to win the game.

After the conclusion, the Arizona section at one end of the stadium next to the visiting section began to throw debris at the Oregon players. An Oregon cheerleader, Katelynn Johnson, was struck in the head with a full water bottle, giving her a concussion.

=== Oregon State ===
#13 Oregon State at #7 Oregon

Team	1	2	3	4	Total
Oregon State	10	13	10	0	33
• Oregon	14	7	13	3	37

- Date: December 3
- Location: Autzen Stadium, Eugene, OR
- Game start: 9:00 p.m. EST
- Television network: ESPN

Scoring summary
1	11:21	OSU	Jacquizz Rodgers 1-yard run (Justin Kahut kick)	OSU 7–0
1	8:14	ORE	LaMichael James 1-yard run (Morgan Flint kick)	Tied 7–7
1	5:09	OSU	Justin Kahut 40-yard field goal	OSU 10–7
1	3:46	ORE	Jeff Maehl 73-yard pass from Jeremiah Masoli (Morgan Flint kick)	ORE 14–10
2	7:20	OSU	Justin Kahut 28-yard field goal	ORE 14–13
2	4:30	OSU	Justin Kahut 29-yard field goal	OSU 16–14
2	1:19	ORE	LaMichael James 6-yard run (Morgan Flint kick)	ORE 21–16
2	0:14	OSU	James Rodgers 28-yard pass from Sean Canfield (Justin Kahut kick)	OSU 23–21
3	10:51	OSU	Casey Kjos 9-yard pass from Sean Canfield (Justin Kahut kick)	OSU 30–21
3	5:45	ORE	LeGarrette Blount 12-yard run (Morgan Flint kick)	OSU 30–28
3	2:28	OSU	Justin Kahut 45-yard field goal	OSU 33–28
3	1:20	ORE	LaMichael James 52-yard run (run failed)	ORE 34–33
4	10:13	ORE	Morgan Flint 34-yard field goal	ORE 37–33

Uniform combination: yellow helmet, throwback green jersey, white pants

The Ducks crushed the Beavers' Rose Bowl aspirations for the second year in a row and managed to secure their own with a 37–33 home victory over the Beavers at Autzen Stadium. Quarterback Jeremiah Masoli ran over safety Lance Mitchell in order to reach a first down much like his performance against UCLA and Oklahoma State last year where he ran over other players. Suspended running back LeGarrette Blount saw his first action since the Boise State loss and took out his frustration this time in a sportsman like way by running over Oregon State linebacker Keaton Kristick who was regarded as the most feared player in the Pac-10. Blount also stiffarmed and threw Stephen Paea to the ground who was regarded as the best defensive tackle in the Pac-10. When Oregon was down 30 to 21 Blount broke free and rushed for a 12-yard touchdown to bring the game closer before Lamichael James broke free for 52 on a touchdown run. In total Blount rushed for 7 times for 51 yards and a touchdown.

=== Ohio State (Rose Bowl) ===
	1	2	3	4	Total
#8 Buckeyes	10	6	3	7	26
#7 Ducks	0	10	7	0	17

Uniform combination: white helmet, green jersey, white pants

Oregon returns to the Rose Bowl for the fifth time and first since the 1994 season. That year the Ducks lost to No. 2 ranked and undefeated Penn State, 38–20. Oregon has never beaten Ohio State in their seven previous meetings. Their most recent meeting occurred in Columbus in 1987, with the Ducks losing 24–14. Oregon and Ohio State have played in the Rose Bowl once before. The 1958 Rose Bowl game turned out to be a defensive struggle as the Ducks eventually lost to the heavily favored Buckeyes 10–7. Ohio State would go on to share the National Title that year, the Ducks would have to wait 37 more years to return to Pasadena. Ducks QB Jack Crabtree was named MVP of the game that year, the last and only second time ever that a person from the losing team had been bestowed that honor. This time the Ducks will try to win the Rose Bowl for the first time since 1917, a 14–0 victory over Pennsylvania. The Oregon Ducks lost to the Ohio State Buckeyes in the Rose Bowl in 2010, 26–17.

1st quarter

- 11:38 OSU Saine 13-yard pass from Pryor (Pettrey kick) 7–0 OSU
- 0:34 OSU Barclay 19-yard field goal 10–0 OSU

2nd quarter

- 14:24 ORE Flint 24-yard field goal 10–3 OSU
- 9:05 ORE Blount 3-yard run (Flint kick) 10–10
- 1:05 OSU Barclay 30-yard field goal 13–10 OSU
- 0:00 OSU Pettrey 45-yard field goal 16–10 OSU

3rd quarter

- 11:03 ORE Masoli 1-yard run (Flint kick) 17–16 ORE
- 6:36 OSU Barclay 38-yard field goal 19–17 OSU

4th quarter

- 7:02 OSU Posey 17-yard pass from Pryor (Pettrey kick) 26–17 OSU

== Roster ==
2009 Oregon Ducks
Cornerbacks: 6 Walter Thurmond III; 8 Brian Butterfield; 13 Tyrone Radford; 14 Javes Lewis; 17 Willie Glasper; 18 Anthony Gildon; 36 Will Wallace; 37 Talmadge Jackson III; N/A Cliff Harris; Defensive backs: 12 Brian Jackson; 19 Talon Goon; 28 Scott Grady; 34 Pono Kam; Defensive ends: 33 Tyrell Irvin; 39 Will Tukuafu; 41 Matt Simms; 45 Terrell Turner; 66 Taylor Hart; 86 Chris DiVincenzo; 89 Mike DiVincenzo; 94 Keaton Arden; 99 Zac Clark; Defensive tackles: 50 Simi Toeaina; 59 Terrance Montgomery; 88 Brandon Bair; 90 Blake Ferras; 92 Wade Keliikipi; 93 Anthony Anderson; 96 Andrew Iupati	Linebackers: 11 Eddie Pleasant; 25 Bo Lokombo; 35 Spencer Paysinger; 38 Tyler Briffett; 40 Blake Thompson; 43 Bryson Littlejohn; 44 Brandon Hanna; 46 Michael Clay; 47 Kiko Alonso; 53 Dewitt Stuckey; 54 Riley Showalter; 55 Casey Matthews; 56 Josh Kaddu; 57 Keloni Kamalani; 58 Kenny Rowe; 64 Jennings Stewart; Long snappers: 51 Steven Patterson; 59 Jeff Palmer; Offensive linemen: 52 NaDerris Ward; 54 Jordan Holmes; 57 Trevor Fox; 61 Nick Cody; 63 Mana Greig; 64 Max Forer; 68 C.E. Kaiser; 69 Bo Thran; 70 Ramsen Golpashin; 71 Everett Benyard; 73 Brenton Spickerman; 74 Darrion Weems; 75 Jamaal Burrell; 77 Carson York; 78 Karrington Armstrong; 79 Mark Asper	Offensive tackles: 65 Lance Barker; 76 Charlie Carmichael; Punters: 30 Tim Taylor; 49 Jackson Rice; Place Kickers: 25 Morgan Flint; 48 Mike Bowlin; 93 Rob Beard; Quarterbacks: 1 Darron Thomas; 7 Nate Costa; 8 Jeremiah Masoli; 14 Dustin Haines; 16 Daryle Hawkins; Running backs: 5 Remene Alston Jr.; 9 LeGarrette Blount; 21 LaMichael James; 22 Andre Crenshaw; 24 Kenjon Barner; 31 Jide Shinaba; 37 Craig Loper	Safeties: 1 Marvin Johnson; 2 T. J. Ward; 7 Chad Peppars; 20 John Boyett; 27 Titus Jackson; Tight ends: 26 Malachi Lewis; 42 David Paulson; 82 Dion Jordan; 83 Ed Dickson; 96 Brian Teague; 97 Clint Sager; Wide receivers: 4 Tyrece Gaines; 10 D.J. Davis; 15 Blake Cantu; 19 Jamere Holland; 23 Jeff Maehl; 30 Nick Cole; 80 Lavasier Tuinei; 81 Rory Cavaille; 85 Diante Jackson; 86 Garrett Embrey; 90 Will Murphy; 94 Mike Mackie; 98 Justin Hoffman

== Coaching staff ==
- Chip Kelly – Head coach
- Steve Greatwood – Offensive line
- Nick Aliotti – Defensive coordinator
- Mark Helfrich – Offensive coordinator
- Gary Campbell – Running backs
- Jerry Azzinaro – Defensive line
- John neal – Secondary
- Tom Osborne – Tight ends & special teams
- Don Pellum – Linebackers & recruiting coordinator
- Scott Frost – Wide receivers
- Jim radcliffe – Head strength and conditioning coach
- Alex Miller – Graduate assistant coach
- Peter Sirmon – Graduate assistant coach
- Jeff hawkins – Senior associate athletics director, football operations
- Kyle wiest – Asst. director of football operations
- Jim fisher – Asst. director of football operations/recruiting
- Brett “Sandy” Moyer – Equipment manager

== Rankings ==
Ranking movements Legend: ██ Increase in ranking ██ Decrease in ranking — = Not ranked
	Week															
Poll	Pre	1	2	3	4	5	6	7	8	9	10	11	12	13	14	Final
AP	16	—	—	—	16	13	13	12	10	7	14	11	10	7	7	11
Coaches	14	—	—	—	25	17	16	14	12	8	16	11	10	8	7	11
Harris	Not released				23	15	14	12	11	8	14	11	10	8	7	Not released
BCS	Not released							11	10	8	13	11	8	7	7	Not released
