= Kenny Rowe =

American gridiron football player (born 1989)

No. 98
- Position: Defensive end

Personal information
- Born: April 22, 1989 (age 37); Long Beach, California, U.S.

Career information
- College: Oregon

Career history
- 2011: San Francisco 49ers*
- 2011–2012: Saskatchewan Roughriders
- 2012: San Francisco 49ers*
- 2013-2014: Arizona Cardinals*
- * Offseason or practice squad member only

Awards and highlights
- Second-team All-Pac-10 (2010)

Career statistics
- Total tackles: 10
- Sacks: 1
- Stats at Pro Football Reference

Kenneth Lealand Rowe (born April 22, 1989) is an American former professional football defensive end in the Canadian Football League (CFL). He played for the Saskatchewan Roughriders. He played college football at Oregon.

Rowe was the MVP of the 2010 Rose Bowl.
