= List of Baltimore Orioles first-round draft picks =

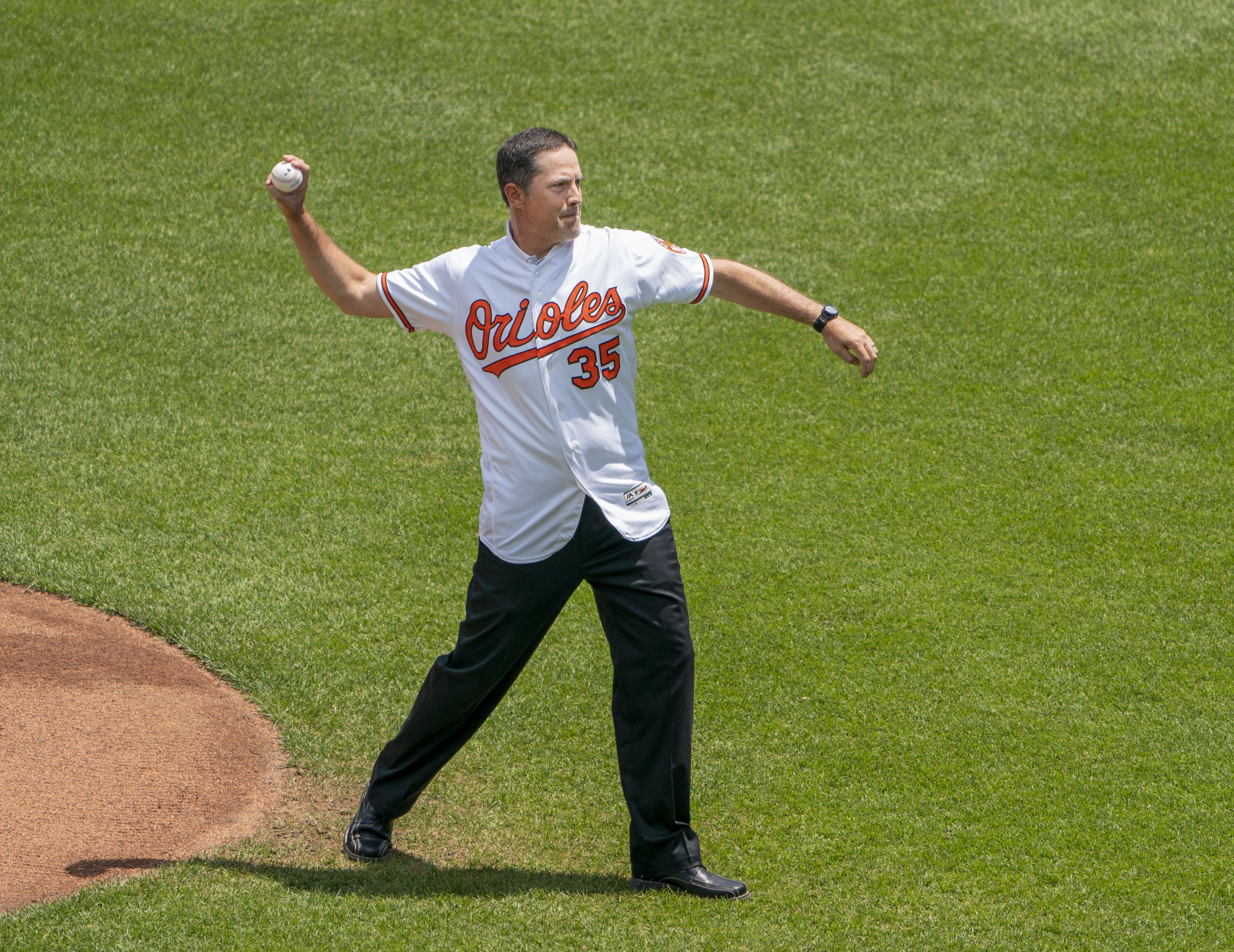
Mike Mussina (1990) made five all-star appearances with the Orioles.

The Baltimore Orioles are a Major League Baseball (MLB) franchise based in Baltimore, Maryland. They play in the American League East division. Since the institution of MLB's Rule 4 Draft, the Orioles have selected 60 players in the first round. Officially known as the "First-Year Player Draft", the Rule 4 Draft is MLB's primary mechanism for assigning amateur baseball players from high schools, colleges, and other amateur baseball clubs to its teams. The draft order is determined based on the previous season's standings, with the team possessing the worst record receiving the first pick. In addition, teams which lost free agents in the previous off-season may be awarded compensatory or supplementary picks.

Of the 60 players picked in the first round by Baltimore, 30 have been pitchers, the most of any position; 21 of them were right-handed, while 9 were left-handed. Twelve outfielders, eight shortstops, seven catchers, two third basemen, and one second basemen were also taken. The team has never drafted a player at first base. 16 of the players came from high schools or universities in the state of California, and Florida follows with five players. The Orioles have also drafted two players from Canada, Ntema Ndungidi (1997) and Adam Loewen (2002). The Orioles have not drafted any players from their home state of Maryland.

Two players have won a championship with the team; Bobby Grich (1967), who was a part of the 1970 World Series championship team, and Rich Dauer (1974), who was a part of the 1983 World Series championship team. Mike Mussina (1990) is the only of the Orioles' first-round picks to have been elected to the Baseball Hall of Fame. One pick, Gregg Olson (1988), has won the MLB Rookie of the Year Award; he won the award in 1989. The Orioles had the first overall selection three times in the draft, which they used on Ben McDonald (1989), Adley Rutschman (2019), and Jackson Holliday (2022). Jayson Werth (1997) was originally drafted as a catcher, but was converted to a right fielder, and primarily plays that position in the major leagues.

The Orioles have made 11 selections in the supplemental round of the draft and six compensatory picks since the institution of the First-Year Player Draft in 1965. These additional picks are provided when a team loses a particularly valuable free agent in the previous off-season,^{[V]} or, more recently, if a team fails to sign a draft pick from the previous year. The Orioles have failed to sign two of their first-round picks, Brad DuVall (1987) and Wade Townsend (2004). They received the 28th pick in 1988 and the 48th pick in 2005 for failing to sign DuVall and Townsend, respectively, as compensation.

== Key ==
Year	Each year links to an article about that year's Major League Baseball draft.
Position	Indicates the secondary/collegiate position at which the player was drafted, rather than the professional position the player may have gone on to play
Pick	Indicates the number of the pick
*	Player did not sign with the Orioles
§	Indicates a supplemental pick
'70	Player was a member of the Orioles' 1970 championship team
'83	Player was a member of the Orioles' 1983 championship team

== Picks ==
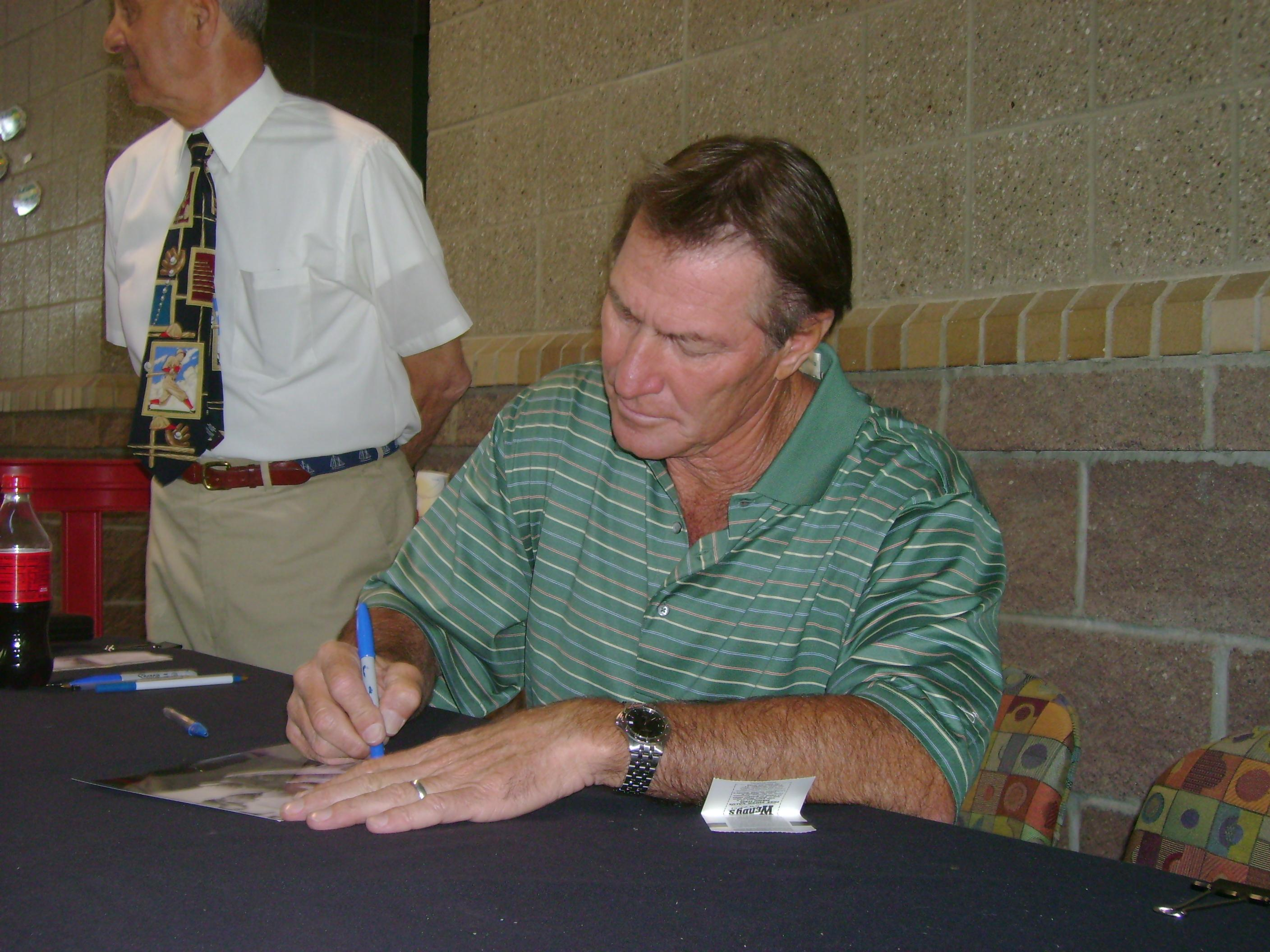
Bobby Grich (1967) was part of the World Series-winning 1970 Baltimore Orioles team.

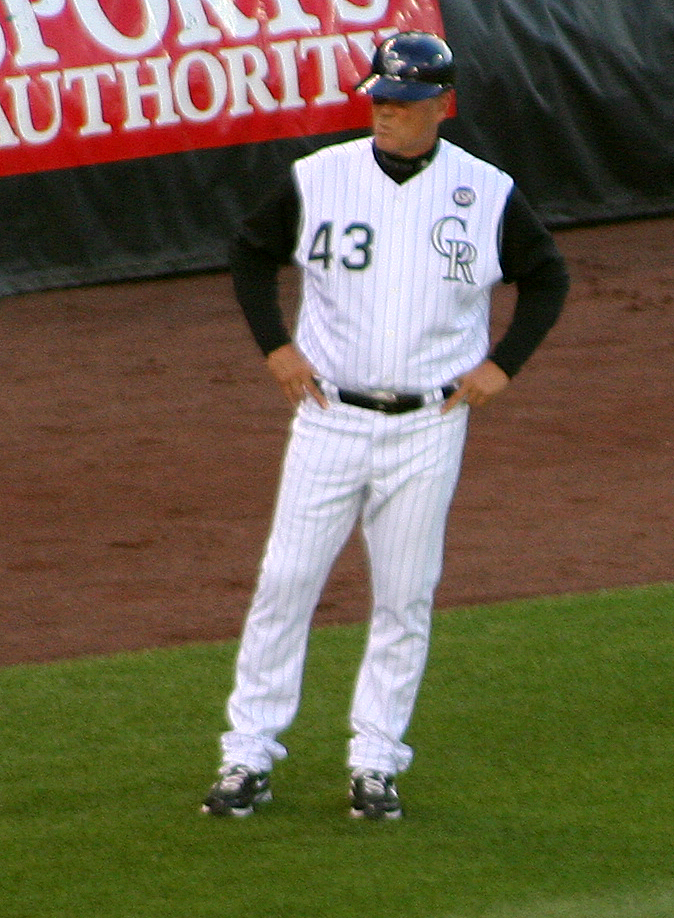
Rich Dauer (1974) was one of sixteen players drafted from the state of California by the Orioles.

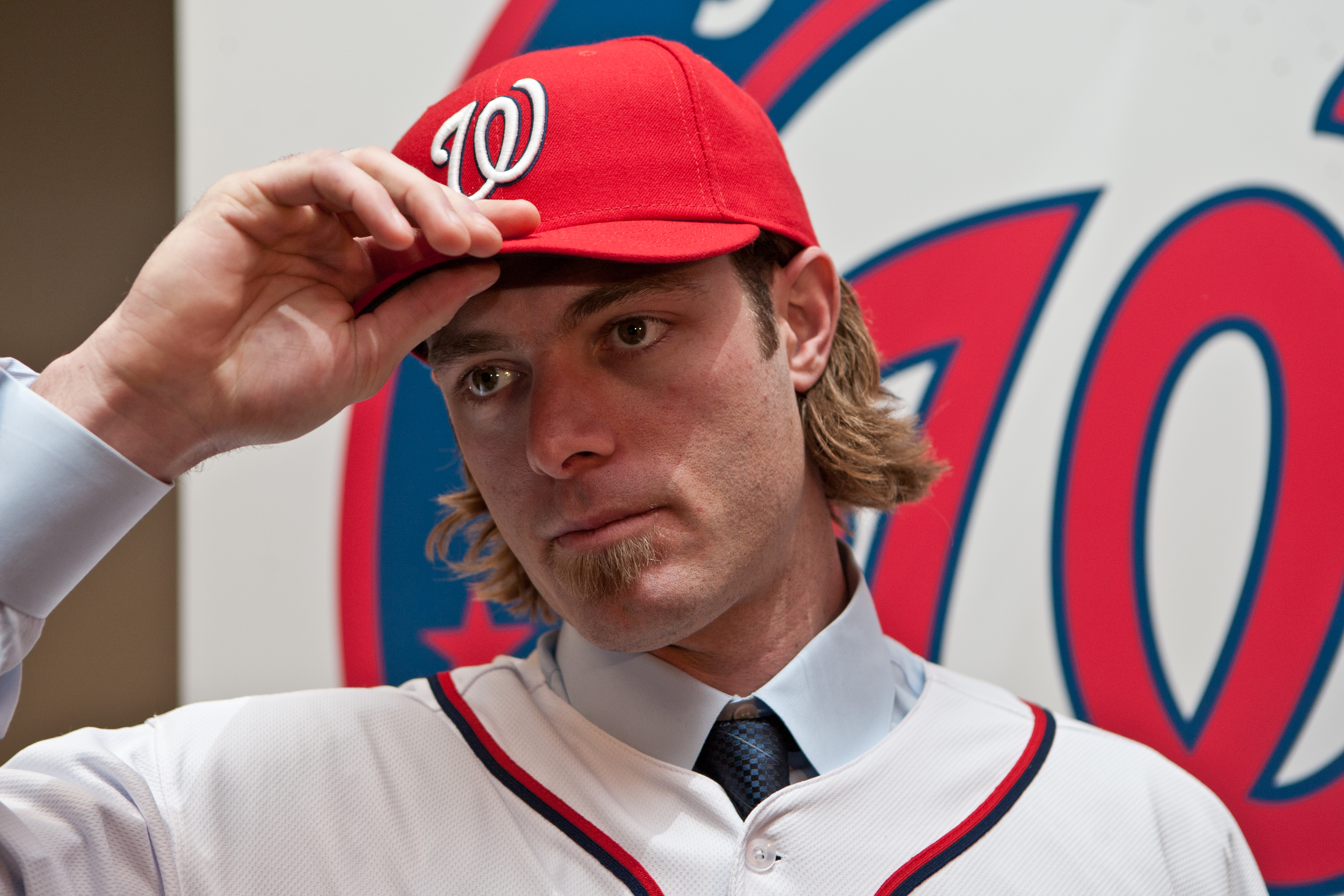
Jayson Werth (1997) was originally drafted as a catcher, but was converted to a right fielder.

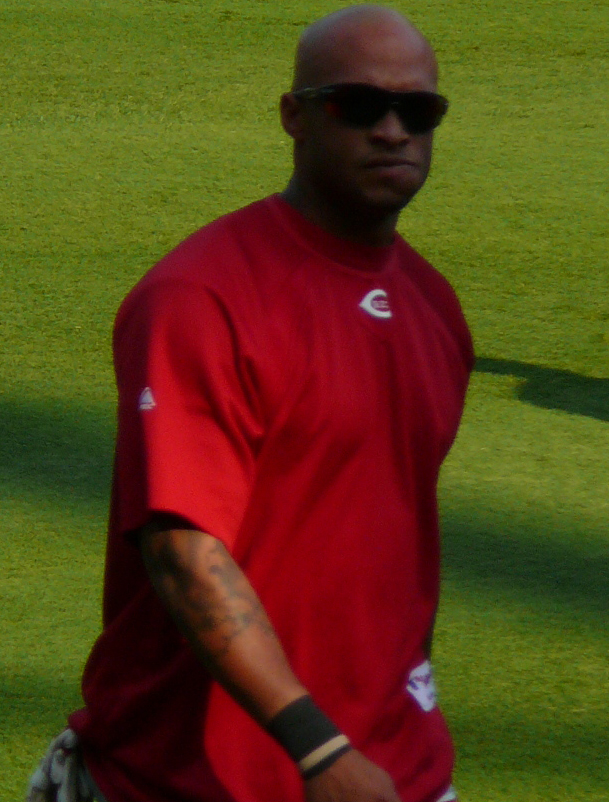
Darnell McDonald (1997) was one of four consecutive outfielders selected by the Orioles in the first round.

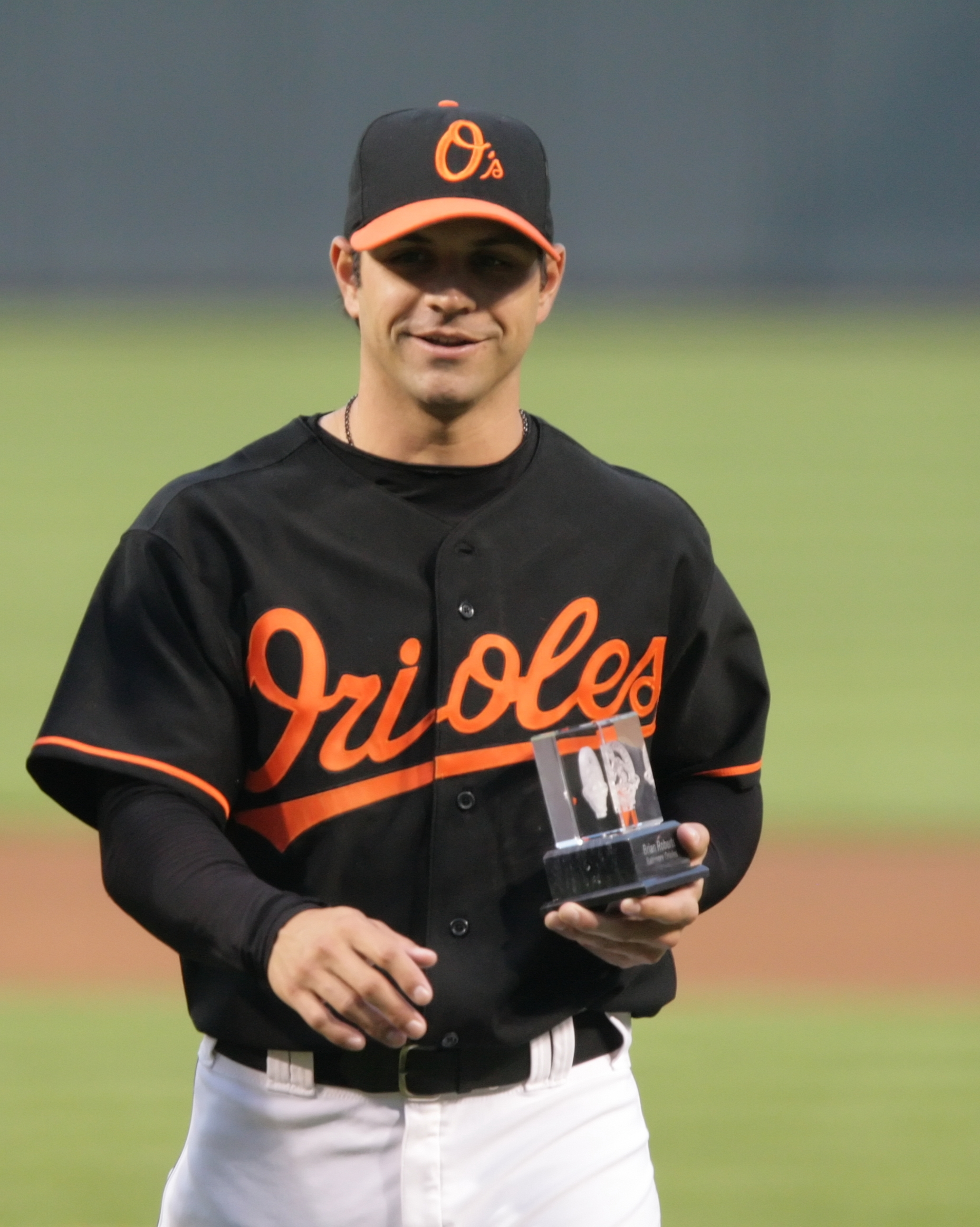
Brian Roberts (1999) was the last of seven players the Orioles selected in the first round of the 1999 draft.

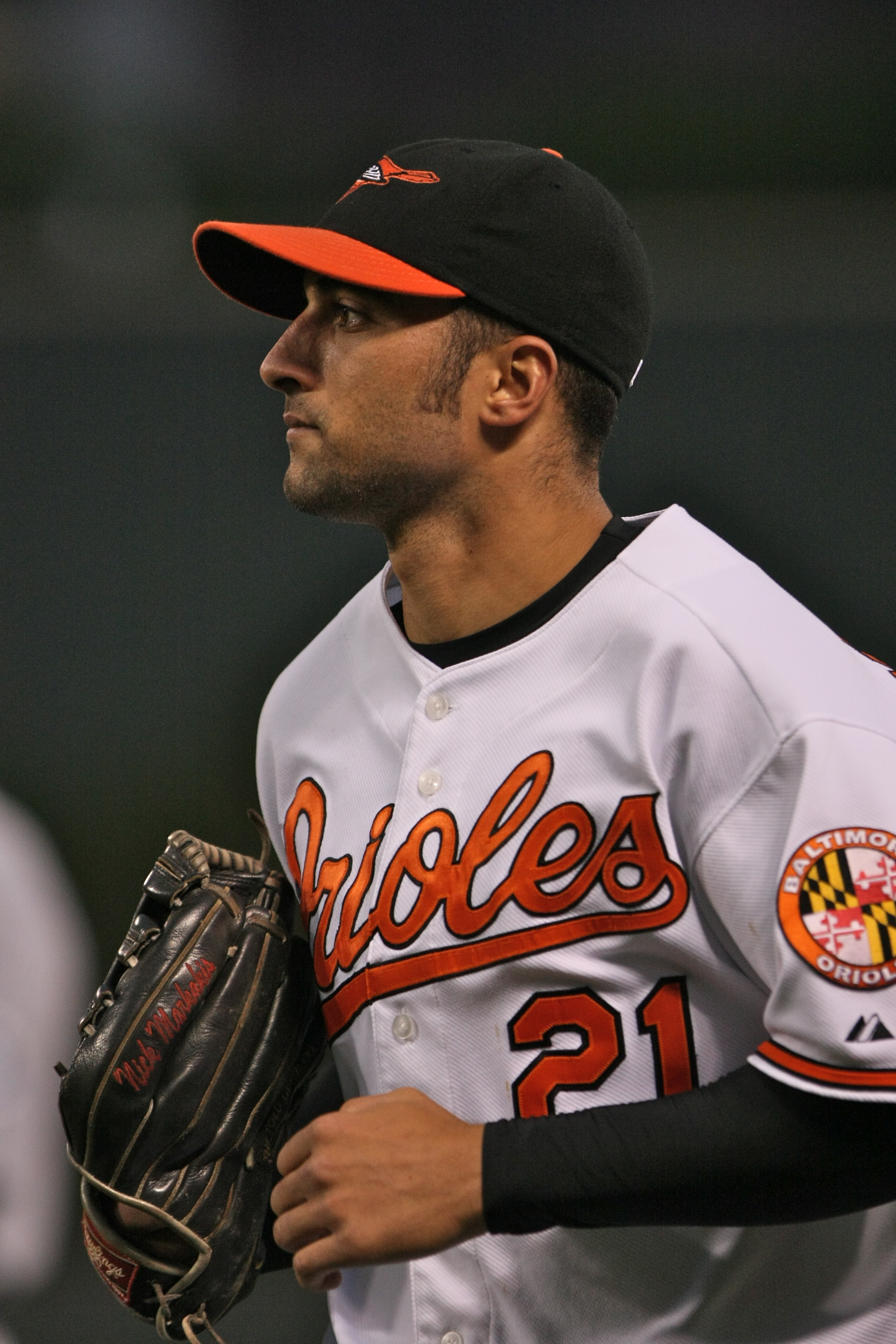
Nick Markakis (2003) was one of four players drafted by the Orioles from the state of Georgia.

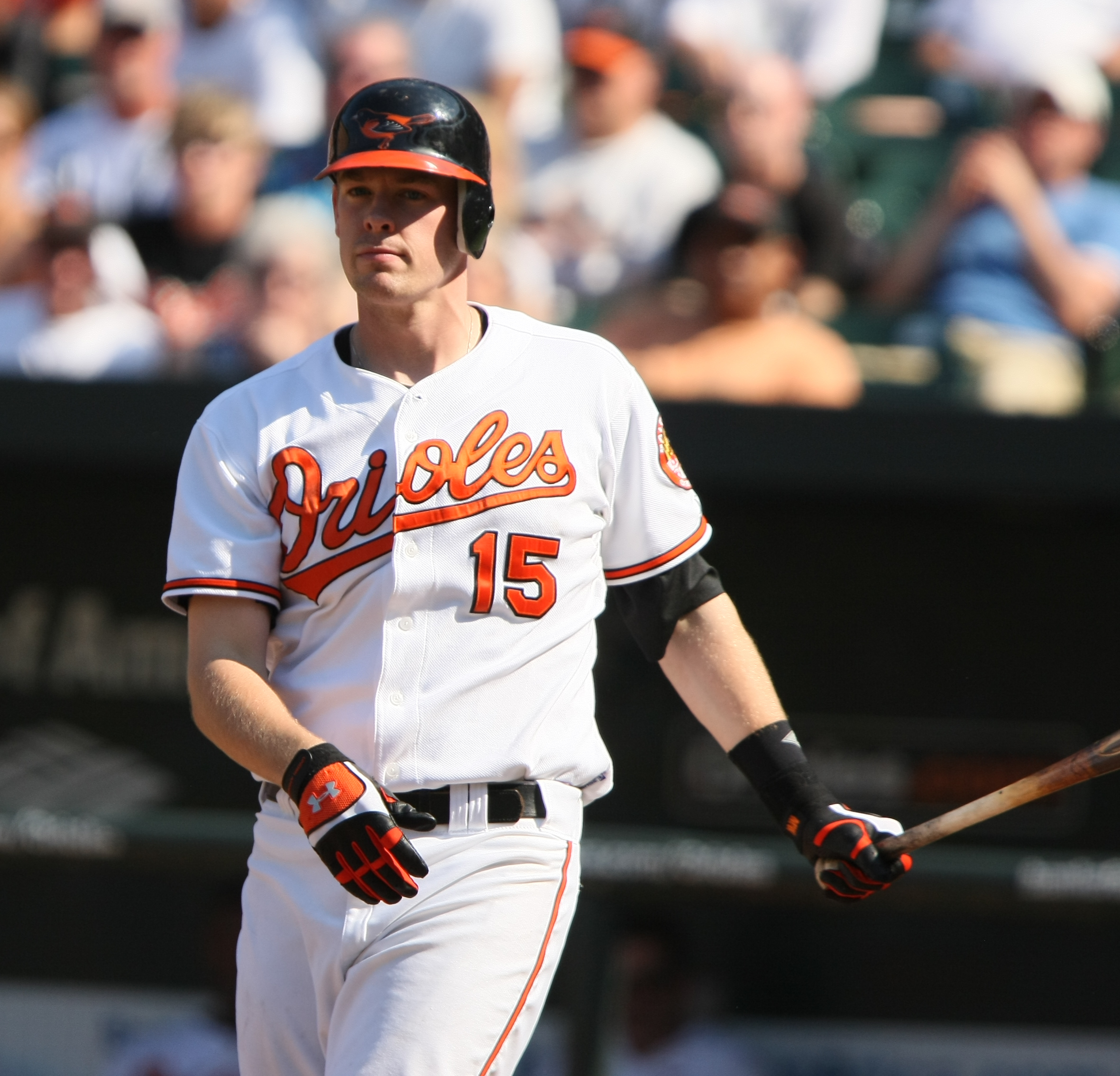
Matt Wieters (2007) is the first of four consecutive players drafted by the Orioles with a pick in the top five.

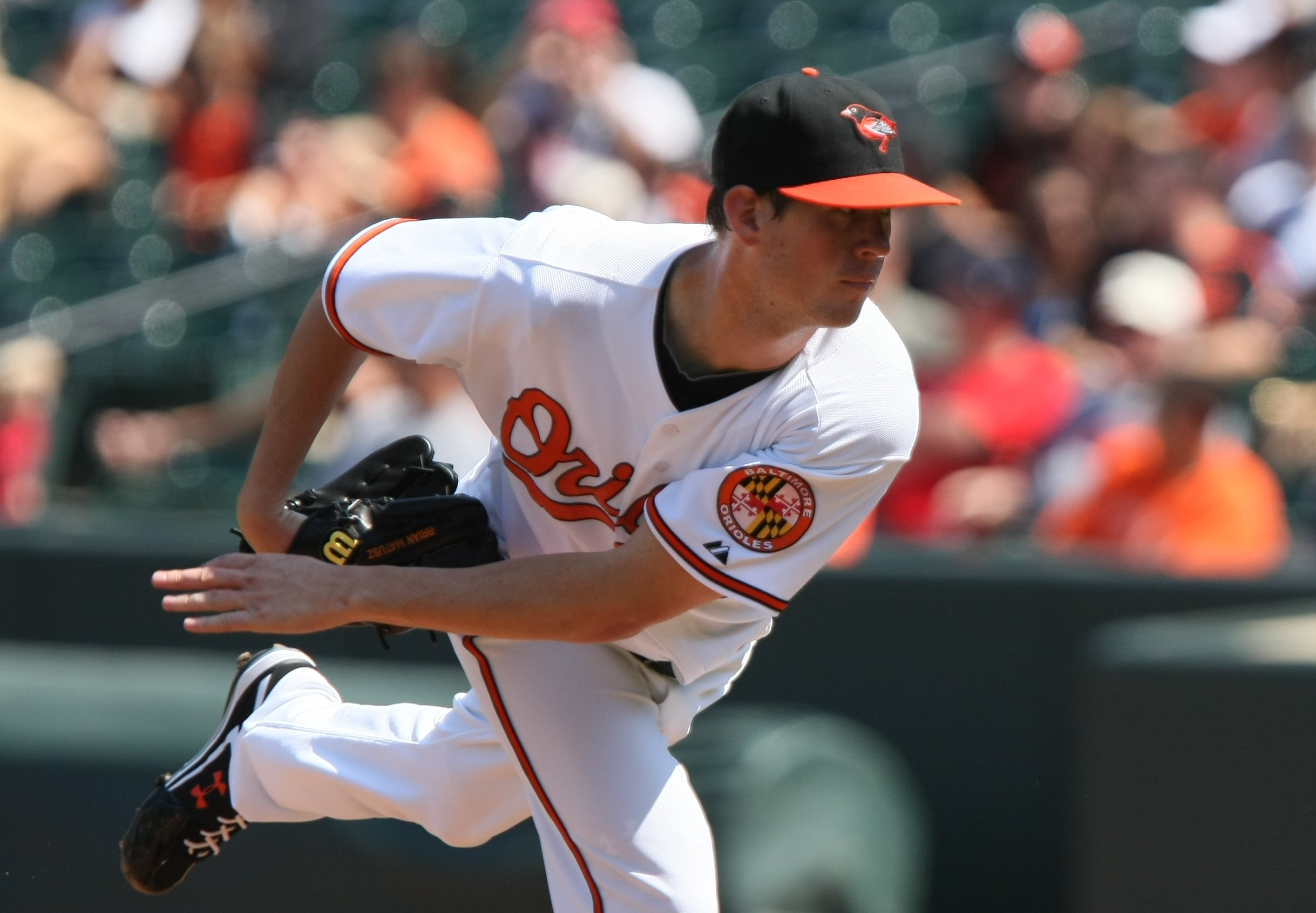
Brian Matusz (2008) was one of nine left-handed pitchers drafted by the Orioles.

Year	Name	Position	School (location)	Pick	Ref
1965	Scott McDonald	Right-handed pitcher	Marquette High School (Yakima, Washington)	15	
1966	Ted Parks	Shortstop	University of California, Berkeley (Berkeley, California)	16	
1967	Bobby Grich '70	Shortstop	Wilson Classical High School (Long Beach, California)	19	
1968	Junior Kennedy	Shortstop	Arvin High School (Arvin, California)	10	
1969	Don Hood	Left-handed pitcher	Southside High School (Florence, South Carolina)	17	
1970	James West	Catcher	Vashon High School (St. Louis, Missouri)	24	
1971	Randy Stein	Right-handed pitcher	Ganesha High School (Pomona, California)	23	
1972	Ken Thomas	Catcher	Clear Fork High School (Bellville, Ohio)	24	
1973	Mike Parrott	Right-handed pitcher	Adolfo Camarillo High School (Camarillo, California)	15	
1974	Rich Dauer '83	Shortstop	University of Southern California (Los Angeles, California)	24	
1975	Dave Ford	Right-handed pitcher	Lincoln-West High School (Cleveland, Ohio)	23	
1976	Dallas Williams	Outfielder	Abraham Lincoln High School (Brooklyn, New York)	20	
1977	Drungo Hazewood	Catcher	Sacramento High School (Sacramento, California)	19	
1978	Robert Boyce	Third baseman	Deer Park High School (Cincinnati, Ohio)	22	
1979	no first-round pick^{[a]}				
1980	Jeff Williams	Outfielder	Princeton High School (Cincinnati, Ohio)	26	
1981	no first-round pick^{[b]}				
1982	Joe Kucharski	Right-handed pitcher	University of South Carolina (Columbia, South Carolina)	24	
1983	Wayne Wilson	Right-handed pitcher	Redondo Beach High School (Redondo Beach, California)	25	
1984	John Hoover	Right-handed pitcher	California State University, Fresno (Fresno, California)	25	
1985	no first-round pick^{[c]}				
1986	no first-round pick^{[d]}				
1987	Chris Myers	Left-handed pitcher	Plant High School (Tampa, Florida)	7	
1987	Brad DuVall*	Right-handed pitcher	Virginia Polytechnic Institute and State University (Blacksburg, Virginia)	15^{[e]}	
1987	Pete Harnisch	Right-handed pitcher	Fordham University (Bronx, New York)	27§^{[f]}	
1988	Gregg Olson	Right-handed pitcher	Auburn University (Auburn, Alabama)	4	
1988	Ricky Gutiérrez	Shortstop	American High School (Miami, Florida)	28§^{[g]}	
1989	Ben McDonald	Right-handed pitcher	Louisiana State University (Baton Rouge, Louisiana)	1	
1990	Mike Mussina^{†}	Right-handed pitcher	Stanford University (Stanford, California)	20	
1991	Mark Smith	Outfielder	University of Southern California (Los Angeles, California)	9	
1992	Jeffrey Hammonds	Outfielder	Stanford University (Stanford, California)	4	
1993	Jay Powell	Right-handed pitcher	Mississippi State University (Mississippi State, Mississippi)	19	
1994	no first-round pick^{[h]}				
1995	Alvie Shepherd	Right-handed pitcher	University of Nebraska–Lincoln (Lincoln, Nebraska)	21	
1996	no first-round pick^{[i]}				
1997	Jayson Werth	Catcher	Glenwood High School (Chatham, Illinois)	22	
1997	Darnell McDonald	Outfielder	Cherry Creek High School (Englewood, Colorado)	26^{[j]}	
1997	Ntema Ndungidi	Outfielder	Edouard Montpetit High School (Montreal, Quebec, Canada)	36§^{[k]}	
1998	Rick Elder	Outfielder	Sprayberry High School (Marietta, Georgia)	26	
1998	Mamon Tucker	Outfielder	Stephen F. Austin High School (Austin, Texas)	39§^{[l]}	
1999	Mike Paradis	Right-handed pitcher	Clemson University (Clemson, South Carolina)	13	
1999	Richard Stahl	Left-handed pitcher	Newton County High School (Covington, Georgia)	18^{[m]}	
1999	Larry Bigbie	Outfielder	Ball State University (Muncie, Indiana)	21^{[n]}	
1999	Keith Reed	Outfielder	Providence College (Providence, Rhode Island)	23^{[o]}	
1999	Joshua Cenate	Left-handed pitcher	Jefferson High School (Charles Town, West Virginia)	34§^{[p]}	
1999	Scott Rice	Left-handed pitcher	Royal High School (Simi Valley, California)	44§^{[q]}	
1999	Brian Roberts	Shortstop	University of South Carolina (Columbia, South Carolina)	50§^{[r]}	
2000	Beau Hale	Right-handed pitcher	University of Texas at Austin (Austin, Texas)	14	
2000	Tripper Johnson	Right-handed pitcher	Newport High School (Bellevue, Washington)	32§^{[s]}	
2001	Chris Smith	Left-handed pitcher	Cumberland University (Lebanon, Tennessee)	7	
2001	Mike Fontenot	Second baseman	Louisiana State University (Baton Rouge, Louisiana)	19^{[t]}	
2001	Bryan Bass	Shortstop	Seminole High School (Seminole, Florida)	31§^{[u]}	
2002	Adam Loewen	Left-handed pitcher	Fraser Valley Christian High School (Surrey, British Columbia, Canada)	4	
2003	Nick Markakis	Outfielder	Young Harris College (Young Harris, Georgia)	7	
2004	Wade Townsend*	Right-handed pitcher	Rice University (Houston, Texas)	8	
2005	Brandon Snyder	Catcher	Westfield High School (Centreville, Virginia)	13	
2005	Garrett Olson	Left-handed pitcher	California Polytechnic State University (San Luis Obispo, California)	48§^{[v]}	
2006	Billy Rowell	Third baseman	Bishop Eustace Preparatory School (Gloucester, New Jersey)	9	
2006	Pedro Beato	Right-handed pitcher	St. Petersburg College (St. Petersburg, Florida)	32§^{[w]}	
2007	Matt Wieters	Catcher	Georgia Institute of Technology (Atlanta, Georgia)	5	
2008	Brian Matusz	Left-handed pitcher	University of San Diego (San Diego, California)	4	
2009	Matt Hobgood	Right-handed pitcher	Norco High School (Norco, California)	5	
2010	Manny Machado	Shortstop	Brito High School (Miami, Florida)	3	
2011	Dylan Bundy	Right-handed pitcher	Owasso High School (Owasso, Oklahoma)	4	
2012	Kevin Gausman	Right-handed pitcher	Louisiana State University (Baton Rouge, Louisiana)	4	
2013	Hunter Harvey	Right-handed pitcher	Bandys High School (Catawba, NC)	22	
2013	Josh Hart	Center fielder	Parkview High School (Lilburn, Georgia)	37§	
2014	no first-round pick				
2015	DJ Stewart	Outfielder	Florida State University (Tallahassee, Florida)	25	
2015	Ryan Mountcastle	Shortstop	Paul J. Hagerty High School (Oviedo, Florida)	36§	
2016	Cody Sedlock	Right-handed pitcher	University of Illinois at Urbana–Champaign (Champaign, Illinois)	27§	
2017	DL Hall	Left-handed pitcher	Valdosta High School (Valdosta, Georgia)	21	
2018	Grayson Rodriguez	Right-handed pitcher	Central Heights High School (Nacogdoches, Texas)	11	
2019	Adley Rutschman	Catcher	Oregon State University (Corvallis, Oregon)	1	
2020	Heston Kjerstad	Outfielder	University of Arkansas (Fayetteville, Arkansas)	2	
2021	Colton Cowser	Outfielder	Sam Houston State (Huntsville, Texas)	5	
2022	Jackson Holliday	Shortstop	Stillwater High School (Stillwater, Oklahoma)	1	
2023	Enrique Bradfield Jr.	Outfielder	Vanderbilt University (Nashville, Tennessee)	17	
2024	Vance Honeycutt	Outfielder	University of North Carolina (Chapel Hill, North Carolina)	22	
2025	Ike Irish	Catcher	Auburn University (Auburn, Alabama)	19	
2025	Caden Bodine	Catcher	Coastal Carolina University (Conway, South Carolina)	30§	
2025	Wehiwa Aloy	Shortstop	University of Arkansas (Fayetteville, Arkansas)	31§	
2025	Slater de Brun	Outfielder	Summit High School (Fontana, California)	37§	
2026	Eric Booth Jr.	Outfielder	Oak Grove High School (Hattiesburg, Mississippi)	7	

== See also ==
- Baltimore Orioles minor league players

== Footnotes ==
- ^{V} Through the 2012 draft, free agents were evaluated by the Elias Sports Bureau and rated "Type A", "Type B", or not compensation-eligible. If a team offered arbitration to a player but that player refused and subsequently signed with another team, the original team was able to receive additional draft picks. If a "Type A" free agent left in this way, his previous team received a supplemental pick and a compensatory pick from the team with which he signed. If a "Type B" free agent left in this way, his previous team received only a supplemental pick. Since the 2013 draft, free agents are no longer classified by type; instead, compensatory picks are only awarded if the team offered its free agent a contract worth at least the average of the 125 current richest MLB contracts. However, if the free agent's last team acquired the player in a trade during the last year of his contract, it is ineligible to receive compensatory picks for that player.
- ^{a} The Orioles lost their first-round pick in 1979 to the Chicago White Sox as compensation for signing free agent Steve Stone.
- ^{b} The Orioles lost their first-round pick in 1981 to the Boston Red Sox as compensation for signing free agent Jim Dwyer.
- ^{c} The Orioles lost their first-round pick in 1985 to the California Angels as compensation for signing free agent Fred Lynn.
- ^{d} The Orioles lost their first-round pick in 1986 to the California Angels as compensation for signing free agent Juan Beníquez.
- ^{e} The Orioles gained a compensatory first-round pick in 1987 from the Cleveland Indians for losing free agent Rick Dempsey.
- ^{f} The Orioles gained a supplemental first-round pick in 1987 for losing free agent Rick Dempsey.
- ^{g} The Orioles gained a supplemental first-round pick in 1988 for failing to sign draft pick Brad DuVall.
- ^{h} The Orioles lost their first-round pick in 1994 to the New York Mets as compensation for signing free agent Sid Fernandez.
- ^{i} The Orioles lost their first-round pick in 1996 to the Toronto Blue Jays as compensation for signing free agent Roberto Alomar.
- ^{j} The Orioles gained a compensatory first-round pick in 1997 from the New York Yankees for losing free agent David Wells.
- ^{k} The Orioles gained a supplemental first-round pick in 1997 for losing free agent David Wells.
- ^{l} The Orioles gained a supplemental first-round pick in 1998 for losing free agent Randy Myers.
- ^{m} The Orioles gained a compensatory first-round pick in 1999 from the St. Louis Cardinals for losing free agent Eric Davis.
- ^{n} The Orioles gained a compensatory first-round pick in 1999 from the Texas Rangers for losing free agent Rafael Palmeiro.
- ^{o} The Orioles gained a compensatory first-round pick in 1999 from the Cleveland Indians for losing free agent Roberto Alomar.
- ^{p} The Orioles gained a supplemental first-round pick in 1999 for losing free agent Roberto Alomar.
- ^{q} The Orioles gained a supplemental first-round pick in 1999 for losing free agent Eric Davis.
- ^{r} The Orioles gained a supplemental first-round pick in 1999 for losing free agent Rafael Palmeiro.
- ^{s} The Orioles gained a supplemental first-round pick in 2000 for losing free agent Arthur Rhodes.
- ^{t} The Orioles gained a compensatory first-round pick in 2001 from the New York Yankees for losing free agent Mike Mussina.
- ^{u} The Orioles gained a supplemental first-round pick in 2001 for losing free agent Mike Mussina.
- ^{v} The Orioles gained a supplemental first-round pick in 2005 for failing to sign draft pick Wade Townsend.
- ^{w} The Orioles gained a supplemental first-round pick in 2006 for losing free agent B. J. Ryan.
