= Carl Bradford =

American football player (born 1992)

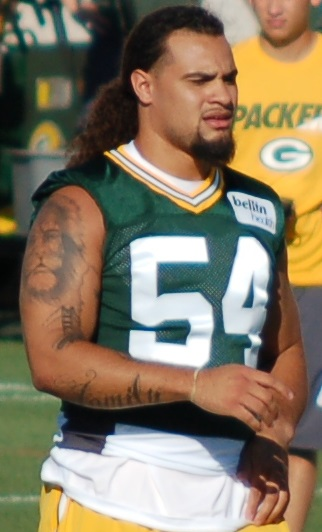
- Bradford with the Green Bay Packers in 2015

No. 45, 54, 43
- Position: Linebacker

Personal information
- Born: August 15, 1992 (age 34); Anaheim, California, U.S.
- Listed height: 6 ft 1 in (1.85 m)
- Listed weight: 250 lb (113 kg)

Career information
- High school: Norco (Norco, California)
- College: Arizona State
- NFL draft: 2014: 4th round, 121st overall pick

Career history
- Green Bay Packers (2014–2016); San Francisco 49ers (2016); Buffalo Bills (2017)*; Chicago Bears (2017)*; Cincinnati Bengals (2017–2018)*; Saskatchewan Roughriders (2018)*; Arizona Hotshots (2019); Houston Roughnecks (2020)
- * Offseason or practice squad member only

Awards and highlights
- Second-team All-Pac-12 (2013)

Career NFL statistics
- Total tackles: 5
- Stats at Pro Football Reference

Carl Thomas Bradford (born August 15, 1992) is an American former professional football player who was a linebacker in the National Football League (NFL). He played college football for the Arizona State Sun Devils, and was selected by the Green Bay Packers in the fourth round of the 2014 NFL draft. He was also a member of the San Francisco 49ers, Buffalo Bills, Chicago Bears, and Cincinnati Bengals of the NFL; the Saskatchewan Roughriders of the Canadian Football League (CFL); the Arizona Hotshots of the Alliance of American Football (AAF); and the Houston Roughnecks of the XFL.

== Early life ==
Bradford attended Norco High School in Norco, California. While there, he was coached by Todd Gerhart, father of 2009 Heisman Trophy runner-up Toby Gerhart. Bradford played fullback at Norco as a junior and linebacker as a senior. During his senior year, he had 136 carries for 884 yards, averaging 6.5 per carry with 14 touchdowns. Additionally, he averaged 35.3 yards per reception and had four games with over 100 rushing yards. The best game of his high school career came against Corona High School, in which he had 136 rushing yards, three rushing touchdowns, and caught two touchdown passes. He was named to the All-West-Legion list by Prepstar.

Coming out of high school, Bradford was measured at six-foot-one inches and weighed 220 pounds. He was given a three-star ranking from Rivals.com and was ranked as the 16th best linebacker in the state of California, and ranked 61st overall. He received athletic scholarship offers from Arizona State and San Diego State, while also receiving interest from California, Tennessee, UCLA, and Washington.

== College career ==
Bradford decided to sign his letter of intent with Arizona State University and received a redshirt designation his first year on campus. Even so, he earned Hard Hat Player designation for his work in the off-season strength and conditioning program.

During his first year on the field as a redshirt sophomore, Bradford played on special teams and alternated on defense between linebacker and defensive end. He played in all 13 games. During a game against Arizona, he recorded a sack against quarterback Nick Foles and three-and-a-half tackles for loss. Later in the season, he recorded his first start in the MAACO Bowl against Boise State, who was ranked sixth in the nation at the time.

The next year, Bradford started every game of the season. He recorded his first career interception in a 38–17 loss against USC. He also had ten tackles and a fumble recovery. He added two more sacks against UCLA. He finished the season with 81 tackles, the fourth most on the team, and was named as an honorable mention on the All-Pac-12 Conference team. Additionally, 58 of his tackles were solo and 20.5 of them were for a loss. He also had five pass deflections, three forced fumbles, and two fumble recoveries.

In his final year as a Sun Devil, Bradford was named to the preseason watchlists for the Bednarik, Lombardi, and Butkus awards. He started all 14 games of the season. Bradford had a career-best four tackles for loss against Arizona, and later in the season returned an interception for a touchdown against UCLA. During a Halloween game against Washington State, he had arguably the best game of his college career when he had one sack, two forced fumbles, three hurries, and blocked a punt. Bradford's efforts earned him first-team All-Pac-12 honors by Phil Steele. Additionally, he earned second-team by Athlon Sports. He finished the season with 61 tackles, 19 for loss, and 8.5 sacks, all of which were the most on the team.

Having earned his bachelor's degree in criminology and criminal justice, Bradford announced on January 13, 2014, he would forgo his final year of eligibility and enter the 2014 NFL draft. Head coach Todd Graham released a statement saying it was an honor to coach Bradford and wished him the best in his future endeavors. Bradford's official draft grade was not released, but one source revealed that scouts told him he would be a third-round pick.

=== Statistics ===
Source: TheSunDevils.com

Year	Team	G	GS	Tackles					Interceptions						Fumbles	
Year	Team	G	GS	Total	Solo	Ast	Sck	SFTY	PDef	Int	Yds	Avg	Lng	TDs	FF	FR
2011	ASU	13	1	12	7	5	1.5	0	0	0	0	0.0	0	0	0	0
2012	ASU	13	13	81	58	23	11.5	0	5	1	0	0.0	0	0	3	2
2013	ASU	14	14	61	45	16	8.5	0	5	1	18	18.0	18	1	3	0
Total		40	28	154	110	44	21.5	0	10	2	18	9.0	18	1	6	2

== Professional career ==
=== Pre-draft ===
Scouts commented that Bradford played "with urgency" and was quick to the ball. They also commented that he flashed playmaking ability and was an explosive tackler with great hands. They stated that he had great instincts and the athleticism to drop back in coverage. He also had good leaping ability. Additionally, scouts discussed he had a short frame and got caught up on blocks. They also commented that Bradford got locked down by large blockers when they get hands on him. He was criticized for his lack of pass-rushing moves. Overall, he was believed to be an undersized college defensive end who would be an outside linebacker in a 3–4 defense. Bradford was believed to be best used on an aggressive pass rushing team.

External videos
- Bradford's NFL Combine workout

Pre-draft measurables
Height	Weight	Arm length	Hand span	40-yard dash	10-yard split	20-yard split	20-yard shuttle	Three-cone drill	Vertical jump	Broad jump	Bench press	Wonderlic
6 ft 1 in (1.85 m)	250 lb (113 kg)	30 1/4	9 1/2	4.76 s	1.66 s	2.78 s	4.30 s	7.25 s	37.5 in (0.95 m)	10 ft 2 in (3.10 m)	23 reps	14
All values are from NFL Combine

=== Green Bay Packers ===
Bradford was selected in the fourth round (121st overall) by the Green Bay Packers in the 2014 NFL draft. He believed he would be drafted in the second round. He stated he's "always been a sleeper..." and would do what he needed to do to get noticed. Bradford listed his biggest challenge as learning to drop back into coverage. He stated when he first got to Green Bay, his head "was spinning" and that the way the Packers played was like a "foreign language" to him. On May 16, 2014, he signed a contract with the Packers. In his rookie season, Bradford was inactive for every game.

He was released by the Packers during final team cuts on September 5, 2015. On September 7, 2015, Bradford was signed to the Packers' practice squad, where he spent the entirety of his second season. He was re-signed by the Packers after the season ended on January 18, 2016.

For the second straight season, Bradford was released by the Packers during final roster cuts. He was signed to the Packers' practice squad two days later. On November 19, 2016, Bradford was promoted from the practice squad to the active roster. He was released on December 17, 2016.

=== San Francisco 49ers ===
Bradford was claimed off waivers by the San Francisco 49ers on December 19, 2016.

On February 27, 2017, Bradford signed a one-year tender with the 49ers. On May 2, 2017, Bradford was waived by the 49ers.

=== Buffalo Bills ===
On May 9, 2017, Bradford signed with the Buffalo Bills. He was waived on September 2, 2017.

=== Chicago Bears ===
On October 11, 2017, Bradford was signed to the Chicago Bears' practice squad. He was released on October 28, 2017.

=== Cincinnati Bengals ===
On December 6, 2017, Bradford was signed to the Cincinnati Bengals' practice squad. He signed a reserve/future contract with the Bengals on January 1, 2018. He was waived by the Bengals on April 30, 2018.

=== Arizona Hotshots ===
On September 14, 2018, Bradford was revealed as a new signing for the Arizona Hotshots of the Alliance of American Football for the 2019 season. The league ceased operations in April 2019.

=== Houston Roughnecks ===
In October 2019, Bradford was picked up by the Houston Roughnecks of the XFL in the open phase of the 2020 XFL draft. He had his contract terminated when the league suspended operations on April 10, 2020.
