= Casey Hansen =

American football player (born 1985)

Profile
- Position: Quarterback

Personal information
- Born: February 2, 1985 (age 41); Norco, California
- Listed height: 6 ft 5 in (1.96 m)
- Listed weight: 235 lb (107 kg)

Career information
- High school: Norco (CA)
- College: Norfolk State(Oregon St.)
- NFL draft: 2008: undrafted

Career history
- Philadelphia Eagles (2008)*; Spokane Shock (2009, 2011)
- * Offseason or practice squad member only

Career AFL statistics
- Completions-Attempts: 42-78
- Yards: 441
- Touchdowns: 13
- Interceptions: 0
- Rating: 91.13
- Stats at ArenaFan.com

Casey Hansen (born February 2, 1985) is an American former football quarterback. He was signed by the Philadelphia Eagles as an undrafted free agent in 2008. He played college football at Norfolk State as the starting quarterback in 2006 and 2007.

Hansen also played for the Spokane Shock of the Arena Football League.

== Early life ==
Hansen attended Norco High School in Norco, California and was a student and a letterman in football and baseball.

== Professional career ==
Hansen was signed by the Philadelphia Eagles as an undrafted free agent in 2008. He was released prior to training camp. In his rookie season, with the ArenaCup-winning Spokane Shock, he played in 11 games and had a quarterback rating of 141.02. Hansen threw for 447 and thirteen touchdowns for the Shock in 2011.
