= Hobgood =

Hobgood may refer to:

- Hobgood (surname)
- Hobgood, California, former name of Niland, California
- Hobgood, North Carolina, town in Halifax County
