= James Cregg =

American football player and coach (born 1973)

LSU Tigers
- Title: Run-Game Specialist

Personal information
- Born: August 18, 1973 (age 53); Syracuse, New York, U.S.

Career information
- High school: Norco High School
- College: Colorado State

Career history
- Colorado State (1997–1999) Graduate assistant; Colgate (2000–2003) Defensive line coach; Idaho (2004–2006) Defensive line coach; Oakland Raiders (2007–2008) Assistant offensive line coach; Tennessee (2009) Offensive line coach; USC (2010–2013) Offensive line coach; Denver Broncos (2014–2016) Assistant offensive line coach; Los Angeles Chargers (2017) Assistant offensive line coach; LSU (2018–2020) Offensive line coach & running game coordinator; San Francisco 49ers (2022–2023) Assistant offensive line coach; Las Vegas Raiders (2024) Offensive line coach; Ole Miss (2025) Assistant offensive line coach; LSU (2026–present) Run-Game Specialist

Awards and highlights
- Super Bowl champion (50); CFP national champion (2019)

James Cregg (born August 18, 1973) is an American football coach.

== Early life ==
Cregg attended and played high school football at Norco High School in Norco, California.

== College career ==
Cregg played college football at Colorado State University. He was an all-WAC offensive lineman in 1995.

== Coaching career ==
=== Early career ===
Cregg began his coaching career at his alma mater, Colorado State University, where he was a graduate assistant from 1997 to 1999. He was the defensive line coach at Colgate University from 2000 to 2003 at the University of Idaho.

Cregg served as the offensive line coach at the University of Southern California from 2010 to 2013 and at the University of Tennessee in 2009. Prior to that, Cregg was an assistant offensive line coach with the NFL Oakland Raiders from 2007 to 2008.

=== Los Angeles Chargers ===
In 2017, Cregg was the assistant offensive line coach for the Los Angeles Chargers.

=== Denver Broncos ===
From 2014 to 2016, he was the assistant offensive line coach for the Denver Broncos. During the 2016 season, the Broncos won Super Bowl 50.

=== LSU ===
In 2019, he coached for LSU as an offensive line coach and running game coordinator, as LSU won the 2020 College Football Playoff National Championship. Also in 2019, LSU's offensive line won the Joe Moore award for the Most Outstanding Offensive Line Unit in College Football.

=== San Francisco 49ers ===
On March 7, 2022, it was announced that Cregg was returning to the NFL to become an assistant offensive line coach for the San Francisco 49ers.

=== Las Vegas Raiders ===
On February 23, 2024, Cregg was hired by the Las Vegas Raiders as their offensive line coach under head coach Antonio Pierce. On November 3, Cregg was fired alongside Luke Getsy and Rich Scangarello.
