= Garth Gerhart =

American football player (born 1988)

Profile
- Position: Center

Personal information
- Born: October 21, 1988 (age 38); Corona, California, U.S.
- Listed height: 6 ft 1 in (1.85 m)
- Listed weight: 310 lb (141 kg)

Career information
- High school: Norco (CA)
- College: Arizona State (2007–2011)
- NFL draft: 2012: undrafted

Career history
- Cleveland Browns (2012)*; Green Bay Packers (2012–2013)*; Carolina Panthers (2013)*; Green Bay Packers (2013–2014); Cleveland Browns (2015–2016)*
- * Offseason or practice squad member only

Awards and highlights
- Second-team All-Pac-12 (2011)

Career NFL statistics
- Games played: 2
- Games started: 0
- Stats at Pro Football Reference

Garth Gant Hallquist Gerhart (born October 21, 1988) is an American former professional football player who was a center in the National Football League (NFL). He played college football for the Arizona State Sun Devils from 2007 to 2011.

== Professional career ==
Pre-draft measurables
Height	Weight	Arm length	Hand span	40-yard dash	10-yard split	20-yard split	20-yard shuttle	Three-cone drill	Vertical jump	Broad jump	Bench press
6 ft 1 1/4 in (1.86 m)	305 lb (138 kg)	33 3/8 in (0.85 m)	9 5/8 in (0.24 m)	5.29 s	1.92 s	3.16 s	4.65 s	7.63 s	30.5 in (0.77 m)	8 ft 0 in (2.44 m)	33 reps
All values from NFL Combine/Pro Day

Gerhart was signed by the Cleveland Browns after going undrafted in the 2012 NFL draft before signing with the Packers on January 8, 2013. He was released from the Packers on August 31, 2013. He was signed to the Carolina Panthers' practice squad for the beginning of the 2013 season before shortly being released. Gerhart was signed to the Green Bay Packers' practice squad on October 10, 2013. He was later signed to the active roster before Week 1 of the 2014 season. On January 5, 2016, Gerhart signed a reserve/futures contract with the Cleveland Browns. On September 3, 2016, he was released by the Browns.

== Personal life ==
A native of Norco, California, Gerhart was considered a three-star recruit by Rivals.com. Garth Gerhart is the younger brother of 2009 Heisman Trophy runner-up Toby Gerhart. His father, Todd, also played football.
