= Todd Gerhart =

American football player and coach (born 1962)

No. 37
- Position: Running back

Personal information
- Born: December 8, 1962 (age 63)
- Listed height: 5 ft 11 in (1.80 m)
- Listed weight: 225 lb (102 kg)

Career information
- High school: Norco (Norco, California)
- College: Cal State Fullerton
- NFL draft: 1985: undrafted

Career history

Playing
- Denver Gold (1985); Minnesota Vikings (1986)*; Houston Oilers (1987)*
- * Offseason or practice squad member only

Coaching
- Norco High School (2004–2012) Head coach

Career USFL statistics
- Rushing yards: 279
- Rushing average: 5.4
- Rushing touchdowns: 2
- Receptions: 9
- Receiving yards: 125

Todd Gerhart (born December 8, 1962) is an American former professional football player who was a running back for one season with the Denver Gold of the United States Football League (USFL). He played college football for the Cal State Fullerton Titans. He was also a member of the Minnesota Vikings and Houston Oilers of the National Football League (NFL).

== Early life ==
Gerhart played high school football at Norco High School in Norco, California, and was inducted into the school's athletic hall of fame.

== College career ==
Gerhart played for the Cal State Fullerton Titans from 1981 to 1984. He rushed for career totals of 867 yards and six touchdowns. He also caught 46 passes for 339 yards and one touchdown in his college career.

== Professional career ==
Gerhart was selected by the Denver Gold of the USFL in the fifteenth round with the 209th overall pick of the 1985 USFL collegiate draft. He rushed for 279 yards and two touchdowns while also recording nine receptions for 125 yards in eighteen games for the Gold during the 1985 season. The USFL folded before the start of the 1986 season.

He spent time with the NFL's Minnesota Vikings during the 1986 off-season. Gerhart was released by the Vikings on August 22, 1986. He signed with the Houston Oilers of the NFL in March 1987. He was released before the start of the regular season.

== Coaching career ==
Gerhart was the head football coach at Norco High School in Norco, California from 2004 to 2012, posting a combined record of 85–28. He helped the team advance to the CIF-SS championship game three straight years, winning titles in 2005 and 2006. His contract was not renewed in June 2013. Gerhart was also a physical education teacher at Norco.

== Personal life ==
Gerhart's sons Toby and Garth have both played in the NFL. He also coached both of them at Norco High School. Another son, Coltin, played football for the Arizona State Sun Devils. He was also coached by Todd at Norco.
