= Matt Hobgood =

American baseball player (born 1990)

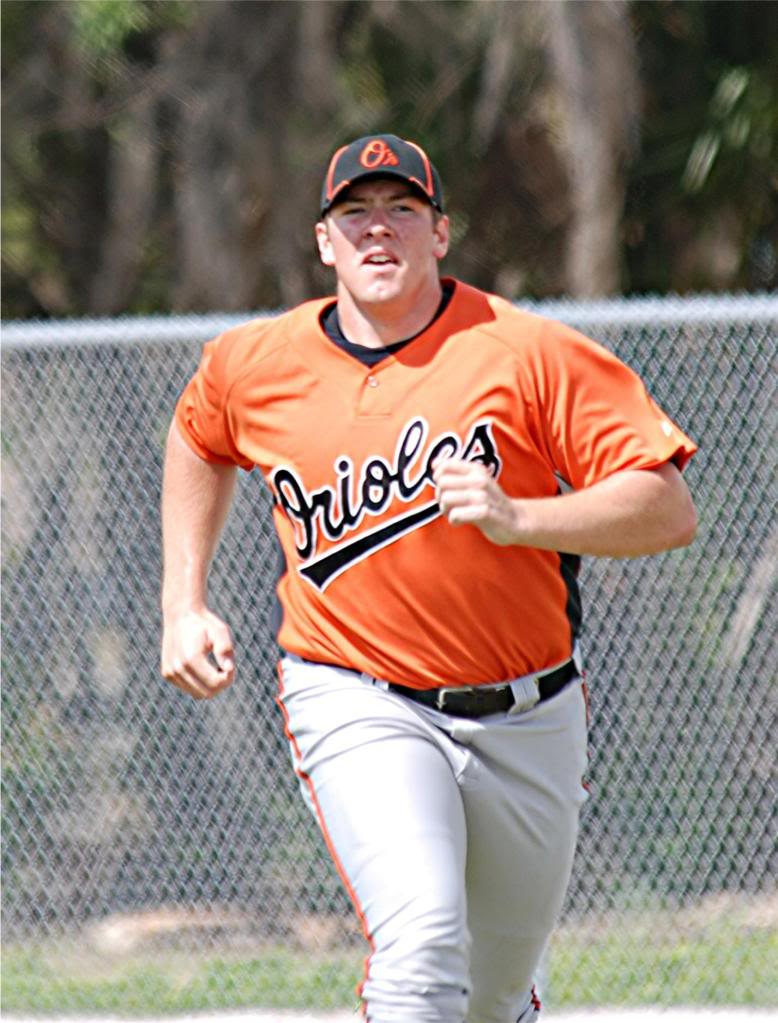
- Hobgood during Orioles Spring Training
- Pitcher
- Born: August 3, 1990 (age 36); Glendale, Arizona, U.S.
- Bats: Right Throws: Right
- Stats at Baseball Reference

Matthew Micah Hobgood (born August 3, 1990) is an American former professional baseball pitcher. He was drafted 5th overall in the 2009 Major League Baseball draft by the Baltimore Orioles, but never reached the major leagues.

== Early life ==
Hobgood was born with strep pneumonia; doctors did not expect him to survive.

He did not play organized baseball until he was eight years old. Hobgood's father, Rick, bought him a glove at age eight, and he began spending his days throwing a baseball against the slump block front of his Glendale, Arizona home. His father noticed his talent and suggested he sign up to play in a city league. At the urging of coaches, he moved over to Little League Baseball at age 11, but soon left to play travel ball after an opposing team refused to face the hard-throwing Hobgood. He hit a 300' plus home run at age 12 at Victory Lane Sports Park in Glendale, Arizona.

== Amateur career ==
Hobgood's father died of cancer when Matt was 14 years old. His mother then moved herself and the children to southern California to be near her family. As a result, Matt Hobgood attended Norco High School in Norco, California, where he walked into high school knowing no one. Nicknamed Arizona by a freshman football coach, for the state from where he had just moved, he was a three-sport athlete (baseball, football and basketball), and a four-year varsity baseball player. He led his team to back-to-back playoff appearances in the CIF Southern Section Division I baseball playoffs against Long Beach Poly in 2008 and Santa Ana Mater Dei in 2009. As a 6'4" 230 lb. "country strong" freshman, Hobgood played center and power forward in basketball, and was heavily recruited by the football coaches who saw him earning a future college scholarship as an offensive lineman. The heavy weightlifting workouts required of linemen were not conducive to pitching, and Hobgood opted to only play one year before giving up football to remain a pitcher.

Hobgood was a high school baseball teammate of former Major League Baseball pitcher Brandon Cunniff. He was also a baseball and football teammate of former Stanford University running back and former Jacksonville Jaguars tailback, Toby Gerhart.

Despite missing nearly his entire freshman baseball season after fracturing his ankle in basketball, he set 14 season and career records at Norco, which still stand to date, including Victories, Won-Loss Percentage, Games Pitched, Innings Pitched, Shut-outs, Runs Scored, Homeruns, RBIs, and Slugging Average. He also broke the Riverside County single season high school home run record hitting 21 home runs his senior year.

As a junior, Hobgood had a perfect 11-0 season, capped off by a pitching performance some professional scouts in Southern California deemed "the best high school pitching duel" they had seen, and which solidified Hobgood's name as a top high school pitching prospect. Hobgood beat former Orange Lutheran High School senior and current (as of 2025) New York Yankees' star pitcher Gerrit Cole in a CIF Semi-Final playoff game, in which Cole was recorded by multiple sources hitting 99-101 mph and Hobgood 95-97 mph on the radar. The Norco Cougars won 1-0 on a run-scoring single against Cole.

As a senior, Hobgood had an 11-1 record, 0.92 ERA with 101 strikeouts and just 26 walks in 68.1 innings. Along with a 95 mph fastball was a quick bat and powerful swing that produced a national-best 21 home runs to go along with a .475 average and 55 RBI.

Hobgood was named the 2009 Gatorade National Baseball Player of the Year after being chosen as the California State Gatorade Baseball Player of the Year following a junior and senior season in which he amassed a 21-1 record on the mound and hit 40 home runs. The only loss during the two-year period came in the 2009 CIF Southern Section Division I playoff game against former Mater Dei standout Cory Hahn.

== Professional career ==
Going into the 2009 draft, many professional scouts were excited about Hobgood; he was expected to be picked towards the bottom of the first round. The Baltimore Orioles picked him even higher, with the 5th overall selection in the 2009 Major League Baseball draft. He signed his first professional contract on June 27, 2009, and began his career with the Bluefield Orioles of the Appalachian League the following day.

Hobgood's professional career did not turn out as scouts expected. The same blazing fastball which he had used to dominate high school never materialized with regularity in the pros. He struggled with various arm injuries throughout his professional career.

In 2009, he had a 1-2 record with a 4.72 ERA in eight games started. He played for the Single-A Delmarva Shorebirds during the 2010 season. He missed the 2012 season due to surgery to repair a loose shoulder capsule, which was performed by noted shoulder specialist, Dr. Craig Morgan, of the Morgan-Kalman Clinic in Wilmington, Delaware. In 2013, he became a relief pitcher. He began the 2015 season with the Bowie Baysox of the Double-A Eastern League, but his season ended after six games when he required arthroscopic surgery on his right shoulder to remove a bone spur. Hobgood elected free agency in November 2015, ending his time in the Orioles system. He never again pitched for any MLB system.

In 2016, Hobgood signed to play with the Joliet Slammers, a member of the Independent Frontier League, but was placed on the suspended list in April 2016 and never appeared in a game for the team. In November 2016, Hobgood announced he would be switching to a batting player in an attempt to make it back into affiliated baseball. But his baseball career never restarted. Shortly thereafter, in 2017, he retired from professional baseball.

== Personal life ==
Hobgood was six years old when his father, Rick, was diagnosed with colon cancer. He subsequently died in 2005, when Hobgood was 14 years old.

Hobgood has been very religious all his life. A Christian, he was known already in high school not to drink or use drugs, and to be very respectful to others. He did, however, struggle to control his weight, sometimes using food as a relief from stress. Considering his congenitally large frame, maintaining proper weight has been a focus of his throughout his life.

In 2019, according to a detailed profile in The Athletic that appeared in April of that year, Hobgood and his wife Katie had four children, and Hobgood worked as a door installer. By 2021, Hobgood and his wife were realtors in Peoria, Arizona.
