= Hobgood (surname) =

Hobgood is a surname. Notable people with the surname include:

- C. J. Hobgood (born 1979), American surfer, 2001 world champion
- Damien Hobgood (born 1979), American professional surfer (twin brother of C.J.)
- Justin Hobgood (born 1979), American racing driver
- Matt Hobgood (born 1990), American professional baseball pitcher

== See also ==
- Nate Hobgood-Chittick (born 1974), American football player
