= Norco High School =

Public high school in California, United States

Location
- 2065 Temescal Avenue; Norco, California 92860; United States
- Coordinates: 33°54′43″N 117°32′50″W

Information
- Type: Public high school
- School district: Corona-Norco Unified School District
- Principal: Melissa Bako
- Teaching staff: 85.23 (FTE)
- Grades: 9-12
- Enrollment: 2,026 (2023–2024)
- Student to teacher ratio: 23.77
- Campus: Suburban
- Colors: Blue, white
- Mascot: Cougars
- Accreditation: Western Association of Schools and Colleges (WASC)
- Newspaper: Cougars Chronicle
- Website: norcohs.cnusd.k12.ca.us

Norco High School is a comprehensive public high school serving over 2,000 students from grades 9-12 in Norco, California, United States. It is part of the Corona-Norco Unified School District. The current principal is Melissa Bako.

== Demographics ==
As of the 2020–21 school year, the enrollment by race/ethnicity is:

- 52% Hispanic
- 39% White
- 4.2% Asian
- 2.4% Black
- 1.9% Two or more races
- 0.3% Native Hawaiian / Pacific Islander
- 0.2% American Indian / Alaska native

== Clubs and activities ==
The April 19, 2007 performance of Invincible Summer at the American Repertory Theater in Cambridge, Massachusetts, was disrupted when 87 audience members from Norco High School left the production mid-performance, with one school chaperone approaching the stage and pouring water over the performer's outline notes.

== Notable alumni ==
- Carl Bradford – American football player (born 1992)
- James Cregg – American football player and coach (born 1973)
- Brandon Cunniff – American baseball pitcher (born 1988)
- Mike Darr – American baseball player (1976-2002)
- Troy Dye – American football player (born 1996)
- Garth Gerhart – American football player (born 1988)
- Toby Gerhart – American football player (born 1987)
- Todd Gerhart – American football player and coach (born 1962)
- Casey Hansen – American football player (born 1985)
- Kinzie Hansen – American softball player (born 2001)
- Pat Harlow – American football player (born 1969)
- Matt Hobgood – American baseball player (born 1990)
- Darryl Kile – American baseball player (1968–2002)
- Eva LaRue – American actress and model (born 1966)
- Ricky Legere – American mixed martial arts fighter (born 1985)
- Kevin Olsen – American baseball player (born 1976)
- Taylor Sander – American volleyball player (born 1992)
- Daimion Stafford – American football player (born 1991)
- Curt Wardle – American baseball player (born 1960)
