= Toby Gerhart =

American football player (born 1987)

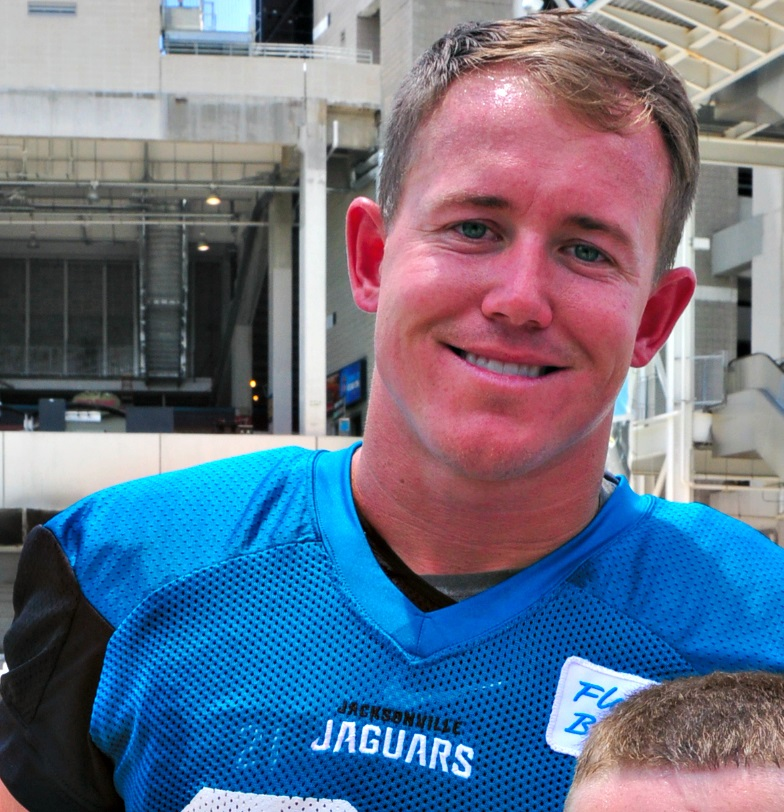
- Gerhart with the Jacksonville Jaguars in 2014

No. 32, 21
- Position: Running back

Personal information
- Born: March 28, 1987 (age 39); Norco, California, U.S.
- Listed height: 6 ft 0 in (1.83 m)
- Listed weight: 235 lb (107 kg)

Career information
- High school: Norco
- College: Stanford (2006–2009)
- NFL draft: 2010: 2nd round, 51st overall pick

Career history
- Minnesota Vikings (2010–2013); Jacksonville Jaguars (2014–2015)

Awards and highlights
- Doak Walker Award (2009); Archie Griffin Award (2009); Jim Brown Award (2009); Unanimous All-American (2009); NCAA rushing yards leader (2009); NCAA rushing touchdowns leader (2009); NCAA scoring leader (2009); Pac-10 Offensive Player of the Year (2009); First-team All-Pac-10 (2009); Second-team All-Pac-10 (2008)

Career NFL statistics
- Rushing yards: 1,675
- Rushing average: 4.2
- Rushing touchdowns: 7
- Receptions: 100
- Receiving yards: 809
- Receiving touchdowns: 3
- Stats at Pro Football Reference
- College Football Hall of Fame

Tobin Bo Gunnar Gerhart (born March 28, 1987) is an American former professional football player who was a running back in the National Football League (NFL). He played college football for the Stanford Cardinal, earning unanimous All-American honors. He was selected by the Minnesota Vikings in the second round of the 2010 NFL draft. With Stanford in 2009, Gerhart won the Doak Walker Award and was the runner-up for the 2009 Heisman Trophy. He received 1,276 points in the Heisman voting, coming in second to Mark Ingram II, who received 1,304 points; the 28-point margin is the closest vote in Heisman history. Gerhart had a breakout senior season in 2009, leading all running backs in the nation in rushing yards, touchdowns, and points scored, and setting several Pac-10 and school records. He held the Stanford record for most rushing yards in a season (1,871) until Christian McCaffrey broke it in 2015, and still holds Cardinal records for touchdowns in a season (28) and most touchdowns in a career (44).

== Early life ==
Gerhart was born in Norco, California. He had a record-breaking career at running back for Norco High School. He set a California state record for rushing yards with 9,662 yards in his career. As of December 2009, Gerhart holds the third highest career total of running yards in national high school football history. He led Norco High School to the CIF Division 5 Southern Section football championship on December 9, 2005. Gerhart was named the Gatorade High School Player of the Year for the state of California and was named California's Mr. Football by Cal-Hi Sports. Gerhart also played baseball and graduated as a valedictorian of his high school class.

== College career ==
Gerhart's high school statistics garnered him interest from many top college football programs. He ultimately committed to Stanford University, where he played for the Stanford Cardinal football team from 2006 to 2009.

=== 2006 season ===
In his freshman year, Gerhart backed up Anthony Kimble at the halfback position, starting one game. He rushed for 375 yards for the season, as Stanford struggled to a 1–11 record.

=== 2007 season ===
In 2007, Gerhart played in only one game, against San Jose State, in which he rushed for 140 yards and one touchdown before suffering a season-ending knee injury.

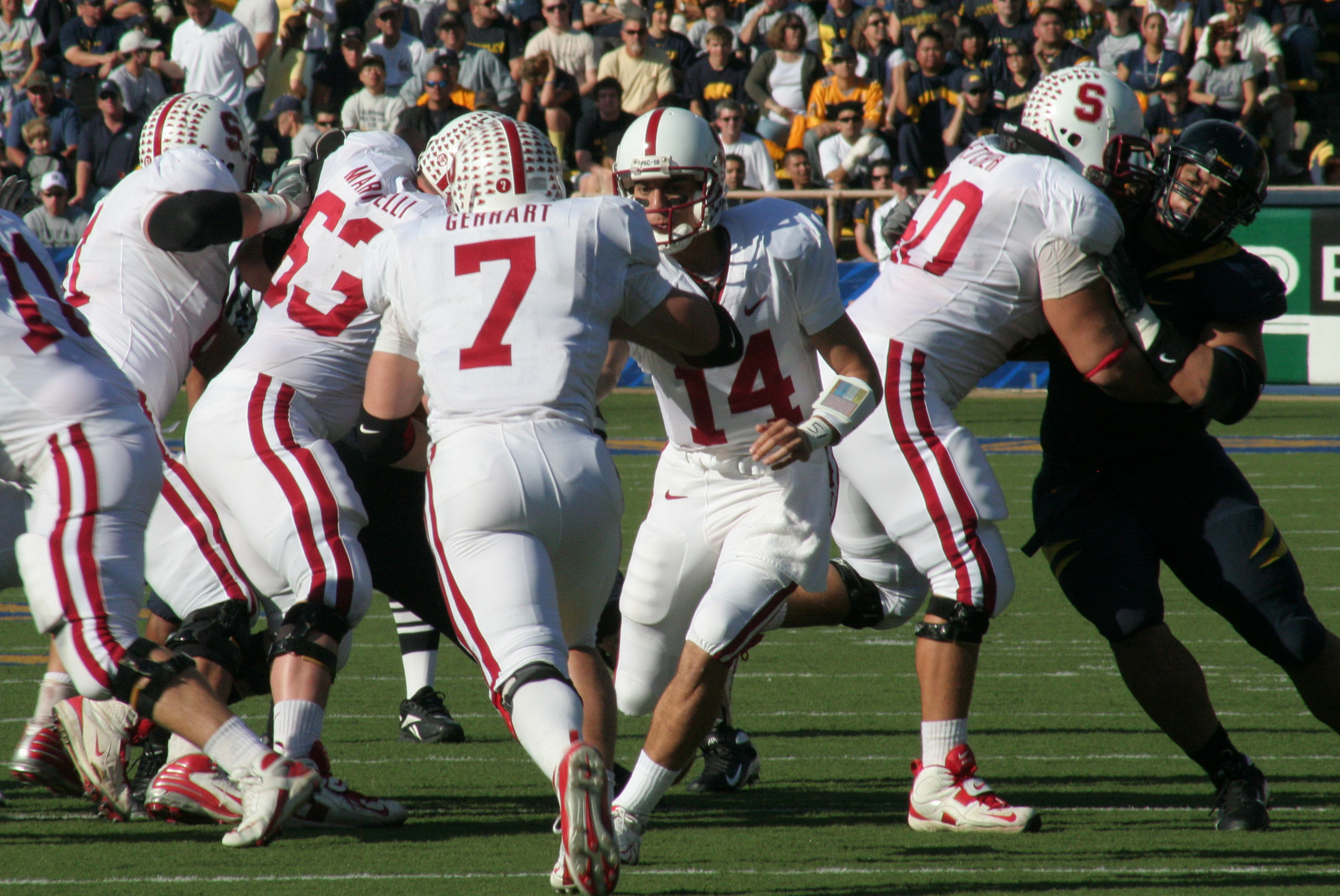
Gerhart (no. 7) carries the ball during the 2008 Big Game against California.

=== 2008 season ===
In 2008, Gerhart had a breakout season under the direction of then-running backs coach Willie Taggart. He set the Stanford single-season rushing record with 1,136 yards, breaking Tommy Vardell's school record of 1,084 yards. Gerhart was the fifth player in Stanford history to run for 1,000 yards or more in a season, after Darrin Nelson, Brad Muster, Jon Volpe, and Vardell. He scored 15 rushing touchdowns, then the second highest single season total in Stanford history. His eight games with 100 or more rushing yards were a Stanford record. He tied a Stanford record with four rushing touchdowns against Washington State. Gerhart averaged 5.4 yards per carry and finished third in the Pac-10 in rushing.

=== 2009 season ===
In 2009, Gerhart had 1,871 rushing yards and 28 rushing touchdowns. Gerhart led the NCAA Football Bowl Subdivision in rushing yards (1,871), rushing touchdowns (28), total touchdowns (28), and points scored (172 points). His 3,522 career rushing yards are the third most in Stanford history, behind Darrin Nelson's 4,033 yards and Stepfan Taylor's 4,300 yards.

Gerhart rushed for over 100 yards in 11 of his 13 games in 2009. On September 26, 2009, he became only the sixth person in Stanford history to rush for 200 yards in a game, with 200 yards on 27 carries against Washington. On November 7, 2009, Gerhart recorded his second 200-yard game of the season, running for 223 yards against the 7th-ranked Oregon Ducks, breaking the Stanford single-game rushing record previously held by Jon Volpe. On November 28, Gerhart ran for 205 yards and three rushing touchdowns in a 45–38 win over Notre Dame. This was his third 200-yard game of the season. Gerhart again tied the school record for rushing touchdowns in a game by running for four touchdowns against Cal. Gerhart also threw one pass in 2009, completing it for an 18-yard touchdown against Notre Dame.

Gerhart helped lead Stanford to an 8–5 record and its first bowl berth in eight years. He finished the season first in Division 1A in rushing yards (1,871) and rushing touchdowns (28).

Gerhart was a unanimous 2009 First-team All-America selection. He was named the 2009 Pac-10 Offensive Player of the Year. He was one of five finalists for the 2009 Heisman Trophy and finished in second place behind Mark Ingram II by 28 points, the slimmest margin in the trophy's 74-year history. Gerhart is the winner of the 2009 Doak Walker Award as the best running back in the nation and of the Jim Brown Trophy presented to the top running back in college football by the Touchdown Club of Columbus. Gerhart won the Touchdown Club of Columbus' Archie Griffin Award, which is awarded after the completion of the bowl games to college football's MVP for the season.

Gerhart was a starting outfielder for the baseball team. He passed up the opportunity to play professional baseball after the 2009 season to return for his senior year at Stanford.

Gerhart majored in Management Science and Engineering.

== Professional career ==
=== Pre-draft ===
Gerhart was offered a lucrative contract to play baseball after the 2009 Major League Baseball draft in June, but opted to play football during the 2009 college football season.

Due to his knee injury in 2007, he had a potential additional year of college football eligibility. He chose to forgo this additional year and entered the 2010 NFL Draft.

Pre-draft measurables
Height	Weight	Arm length	Hand span	40-yard dash	10-yard split	20-yard split	20-yard shuttle	Three-cone drill	Vertical jump	Broad jump	Bench press	Wonderlic
6 ft 0 in (1.83 m)	231 lb (105 kg)	32 in (0.81 m)	9 5/8 in (0.24 m)	4.50 s	1.62 s	2.70 s	4.25 s	6.94 s	38.0 in (0.97 m)	9 ft 10 in (3.00 m)	22 reps	30
All values from NFL Combine

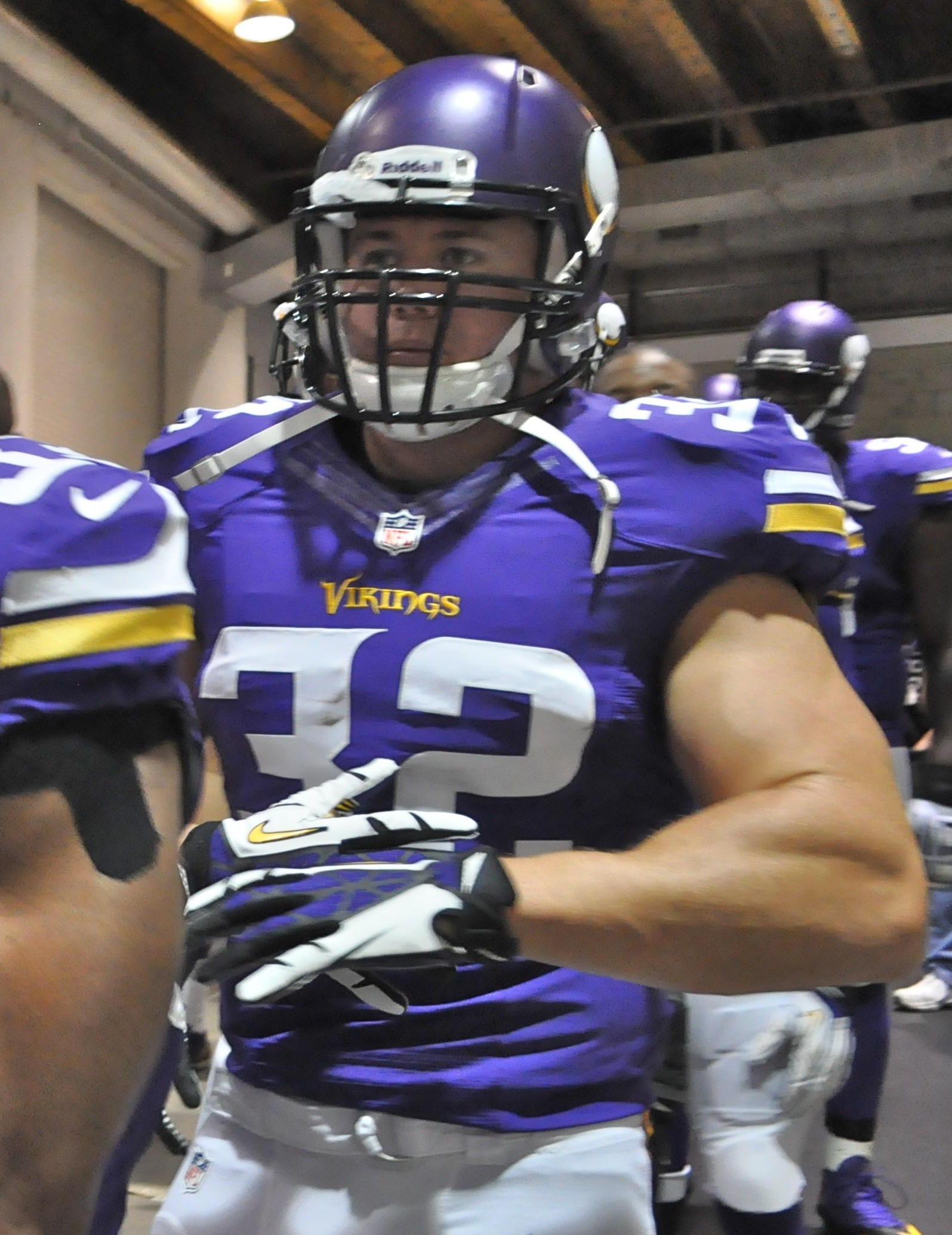
Gerhart with the Vikings in 2013

Gerhart had the highest Wonderlic score among running backs with 30.

=== Minnesota Vikings ===
Gerhart was selected in the second round of the 2010 NFL draft, the 51st overall selection by the Minnesota Vikings. A four-year contract was signed on July 30, and Gerhart's first career NFL rushing touchdown came in a win against the Washington Redskins on November 28, 2010. Gerhart started five games for the Vikings during the 2011 regular season and rushed for 531 yards.

=== Jacksonville Jaguars ===
On March 11, 2014, Gerhart signed a three-year, $10.5 million contract with the Jacksonville Jaguars. The deal included $4.5 million guaranteed. On December 5, 2015, the Jacksonville Jaguars placed Gerhart on injured reserve. He was released by the team on March 10, 2016.

== Career statistics ==
=== NFL ===
Year	Team	Games		Rushing					Receiving					Fumbles	
Year	Team	GP	GS	Att	Yds	Avg	Lng	TD	Rec	Yds	Avg	Lng	TD	Fum	Lost
2010	MIN	15	1	81	322	4.0	21	1	21	167	8.0	23	0	**3**	**3**
2011	MIN	**16**	5	**109**	**531**	4.9	**67**	1	**23**	**190**	8.3	**42**	**3**	1	0
2012	MIN	**16**	0	50	169	3.4	22	1	20	155	7.8	21	0	2	2
2013	MIN	14	0	36	283	**7.9**	41	**2**	13	88	6.8	13	0	1	1
2014	JAX	14	**7**	101	326	3.2	23	**2**	20	186	**9.3**	26	0	1	1
2015	JAX	7	1	20	44	2.2	6	0	3	23	7.7	8	0	0	0
Career		82	14	397	1,675	4.2	67	7	100	809	8.1	42	3	8	7

=== College ===
Legend
	Led the NCAA
**Bold**	Career high

Season	Team	Rushing					Receiving				
Season	Team	Att	Yds	Avg	Lng	TD	Rec	Yds	Avg	Lng	TD
2006	Stanford	106	375	3.5	38	0	**15**	124	8.3	16	0
2007	Stanford	12	140	**11.7**	48	1	0	0	0.0	0	0
2008	Stanford	210	1,136	5.4	46	15	13	114	8.8	21	0
2009	Stanford	**343**	**1,871**	5.5	**61**	**28**	11	**157**	**14.3**	**33**	0
Total		671	3,522	5.2	61	44	39	395	10.1	33	0

== Career highlights ==
=== Awards and honors ===
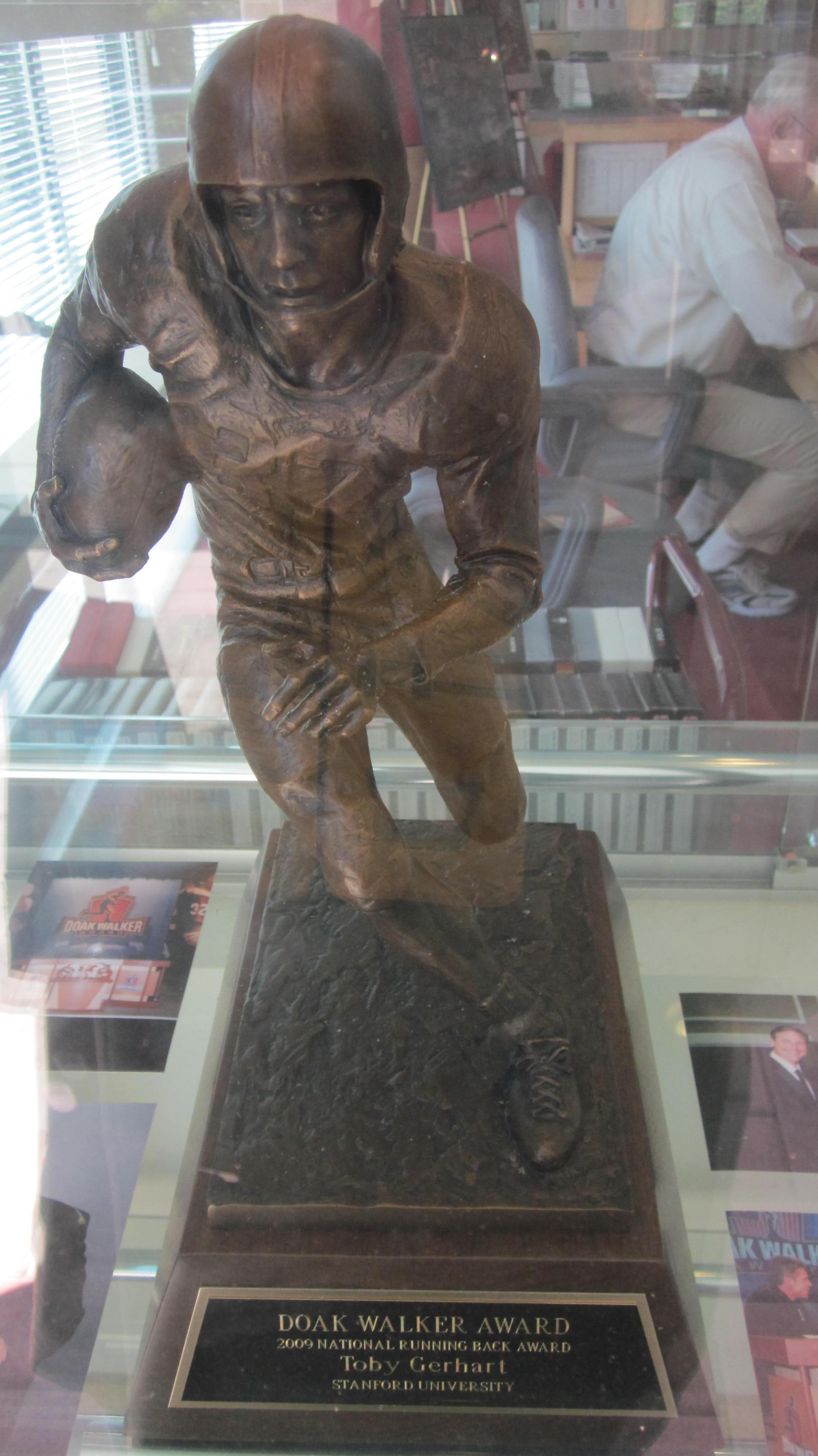
Gerhart's Doak Walker Award on display at the Stanford Athletics Hall of Fame

College

- 2009 Unanimous first-team All-American (Associated Press, American Football Coaches Association (AFCA), Walter Camp Football Foundation, Football Writers Association of America, Sporting News)
- 2009 Doak Walker Award
- 2009 Archie Griffin Award
- 2009 Jim Brown Trophy
- 2009 National Offensive Player of the Year (CBSSports.com)
- 2009 Pac-10 Offensive Player of the Year
- 2009 First-team All-Pac-10
- 2009 First-team Pac-10 All-Academic Team
- Pac-10 Offensive Player of the Week, four times (October 11, 2008; November 7, 2009; November 14, 2009; November 28, 2009)
- 2009 Tom Hansen Conference Medal
- 2008 Second-team All-Pac-10
- 2008 Second-team Pac-10 All-Academic Team
- 2005 California Mr. Football, Cal-Hi Sports
- 2005 Gatorade California Player of the Year
- 2005 Glenn Davis Award

=== Records ===
Pac-12 records

- Most rushing touchdowns in a season (28) in 2009
- Most total touchdowns in a season (28) in 2009
- Most points scored in a season (172) in 2009

Stanford career records

- Most career touchdowns (44)
- Most career rushing touchdowns (44)
- Most career 100 yard rushing games (20)
- Most career 200 yard rushing games (3) (tied)

Stanford single season records (2009)

- Most rushing yards in a season (1,871)
- Most rushing touchdowns in a season (28)
- Most total touchdowns in a season (28)
- Most points scored in a season (172)
- Most yards from scrimmage in a season (2,028)
- Most 100 yard rushing games in a season (11)
- Most 200 yard rushing games in a season (3)
- Most consecutive 100 yard rushing games (7)

Stanford single game records

- Most rushing touchdowns in a game (4) (twice) (tied)

== Personal life ==
Gerhart's father, Todd, was a running back at Cal State Fullerton, played in the USFL, and coached him in high school. Toby is the oldest of six children, all of whom are former collegiate athletes. His brother Garth played at Arizona State University and was an offensive lineman with the Cleveland Browns, while his three sisters (who are triplets) played softball: Kelsey and Teagan played at Stanford, and Whitley played at Cal Poly. Gerhart's youngest brother Coltin played at Arizona State and New Mexico.

Gerhart returned to Stanford in 2018 for the MBA program, graduating in 2020. He currently works in sales for Asurion, an insurance company based in Nashville, Tennessee.

== See also ==
- List of NCAA major college football yearly rushing leaders
- List of NCAA major college football yearly scoring leaders
