= Ntema Ndungidi =

Zaire-born American minor league baseball player

- Outfielder
- Born: March 15, 1979 (age 46); Kisangani, Zaire
- Bats: Left Throws: Right

Ntema Ndungidi (born March 15, 1979) is a Zaire-born Canadian former Minor League Baseball outfielder. He played in the minor leagues in the Baltimore Orioles, Seattle Mariners, and Montreal Expos organizations. He appeared in the All-Star Futures Game.

== Biography ==
Ndungidi was born in Kisangani, in Zaire (now the Democratic Republic of the Congo). His father moved to Montreal, Quebec, in 1981. The rest of the family, including him, followed the next year. He attended Cégep Édouard-Montpetit.

The Baltimore Orioles drafted Ndungidi in the first round, with the 36th overall selection, of the 1997 Major League Baseball draft, making him the highest-ranked MLB draftee from Quebec at the time. He was selected with a compensation pick received for the loss of David Wells as a free agent. The Orioles signed him with a $500,000 signing bonus. Ndungidi is the second baseball player of African descent to play for a Major League Baseball organization, the first being Mark Miller of South Africa, who played Minor League Baseball in the 1970s. Ndungidi had a .295 batting average with the Bluefield Orioles of the Rookie-level Appalachian League in 1998. However, he struggled with the Delmarva Shorebirds of the Single-A South Atlantic League and the Frederick Keys of the High-A Carolina League in 1999.

In 2000, while playing for Frederick, Ndungidi was selected to appear in the All-Star Futures Game. He received a promotion to the Bowie Baysox of the Double-A Eastern League during the season. Participating in the Arizona Fall League after the 2000 season, Ndungidi left the team without permission, and was suspended. Baseball America named Ndungidi the fourth-best prospect in the Orioles organization prior to the 2001 season. After 2001, the Seattle Mariners selected Ndungidi in the minor league phase of the Rule 5 draft. After the 2002 season, he signed a minor league contract with the Montreal Expos. In 2003, he played for the Quebec Capitales of the Northeast League, an independent baseball league.

== See also ==
- Rule 5 draft results
