= Norco, California =

City in California, United States

- City
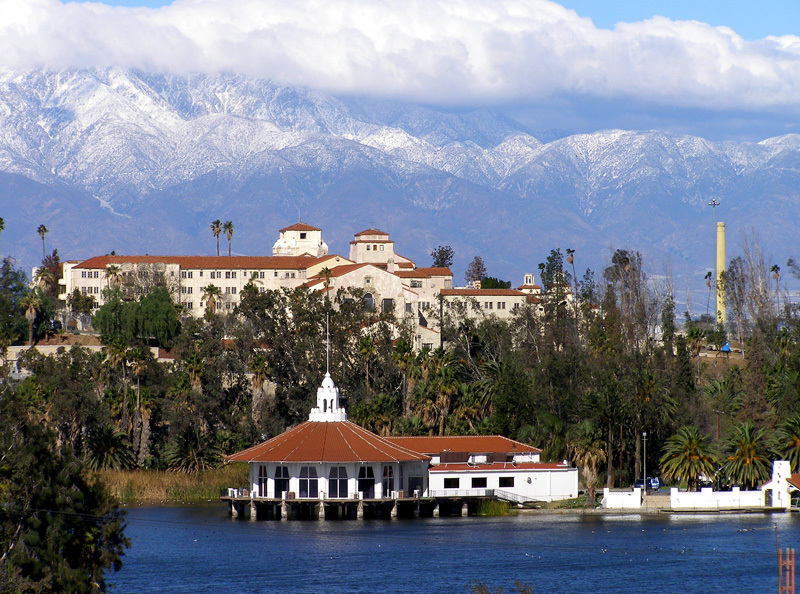
- Lake Norconian Pavilion

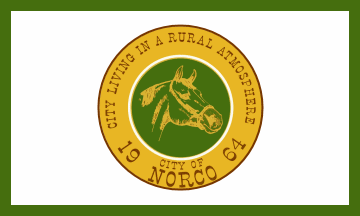
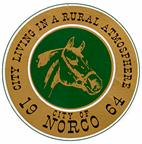
- Flag Seal
- Motto: "Horsetown USA"
- Interactive map of Norco, California
- Location within Greater Los Angeles Location within California Location in the United States
- Coordinates: 33°55′52″N 117°32′55″W
- Country: United States
- State: California
- County: Riverside
- Incorporated: December 28, 1964

Government
  - Type: Council-Manager
  - Mayor: Robin Grundmeyer
  - Mayor Pro Tem: Gregory Bowmen
  - City Council: Fia Sullivan; Greg Newton; Kevin Bash
  - City Manager: Lori Sassoon

Area
  - Total: 14.08 sq mi (36.46 km^{2})
  - Land: 13.86 sq mi (35.89 km^{2})
  - Water: 0.22 sq mi (0.57 km^{2}) 1.56%
- Elevation: 640 ft (195 m)

Population (2020)
  - Total: 26,316
  - Density: 1,899/sq mi (733.3/km^{2})
- Time zone: UTC-8 (Pacific)
  - Summer (DST): UTC-7 (PDT)
- ZIP code: 92860
- Area code: 951
- FIPS code: 06-51560
- GNIS feature IDs: 1652819, 2411265
- Website: www.norco.ca.us

Norco is a city in the Inland Empire region of northwestern Riverside County, California, United States. Located roughly 40 miles (64 km) inland from the Pacific Ocean, Norco is known as "Horsetown, USA" and prides itself on being a "horse community". The area is dotted with corrals, farms, hitching posts, ranches, riding trails, and tack-and-feed supply stores; there are also city ordinances in-place requiring new construction to have a "traditional, rustic ... Western flavor".

As of the 2020 census, the city population was 26,316, down from 27,063 at the 2010 census.

== History ==
Luiseño Native Americans were the first inhabitants of the area.

The city's name is a portmanteau of "North Corona", named after the North Corona Land Company.

Norco had its "grand opening" on Mother's Day, May 13, 1923, and was later incorporated as a city on December 28, 1964.

== Geography ==
According to the United States Census Bureau, the city has a total area of 14.1 square miles (37 km^{2}) of which 13.9 square miles (36 km^{2}) is land and 0.2 square miles (0.52 km^{2}), or 1.56%, is water.

One of the most notable geographical features in Norco, visible from anywhere in the city, are the Santa Ana Mountains.

=== Vegetation ===
Norco is rich in native plant species partly because of its diversity of habitats. The most prevalent plant communities are sage scrub, chaparral shrubland, and riparian woodland. Native plants include the California poppy, Matilija poppy, toyon, Ceanothus, Chamise, coast live oak, sycamore, willow and giant wildrye. Introduced plants include Erythrina afra and Strelitzia reginae. Mexican fan palms, Canary Island palms, queen palms, date palms, and California fan palms are common in the Norco area, although only the latter is native. The Biome is the Mediterranean Biome but has many alternate names: The Woodland Biome, The Shrub Biome, or the Chaparral Biome.

=== Climate ===
Norco experiences a hot semi-arid climate (Köppen: BSh) bordering on a Mediterranean climate (Csa). The city has mild to cool winters and hot summers. Most of the rainfall occurs during winter and early spring.

The spring provides pleasant weather with little rain. In early summer, Norco receives overcast weather known as "May Gray" or "June Gloom". Summer is generally hot, with highs averaging above 90 °F (32.2 °C). During the hottest months, daytime temperatures can exceed 100 °F (37.8 °C). Thunderstorms are rare but not unheard of in late summer. Fall brings sunny and slightly cooler weather with little rain, but can be windy due to the Santa Ana winds that blow October and November. The winter low temperatures can get cold enough for frost, which is not uncommon in December and January. Winter days are pleasant, with the temperature staying around 65 °F (18.3 °C) and occasionally rising above 70 °F (21.1 °C).

Climate data for Norco, California
Month	Jan	Feb	Mar	Apr	May	Jun	Jul	Aug	Sep	Oct	Nov	Dec	Year
Record high °F (°C)	94 (34)	92 (33)	100 (38)	101 (38)	107 (42)	110 (43)	117 (47)	112 (44)	115 (46)	109 (43)	99 (37)	94 (34)	117 (47)
Mean daily maximum °F (°C)	67 (19)	70 (21)	71 (22)	77 (25)	80 (27)	87 (31)	92 (33)	94 (34)	91 (33)	83 (28)	74 (23)	68 (20)	80 (26)
Mean daily minimum °F (°C)	40 (4)	43 (6)	45 (7)	48 (9)	52 (11)	57 (14)	62 (17)	64 (18)	60 (16)	52 (11)	45 (7)	42 (6)	51 (11)
Record low °F (°C)	23 (−5)	26 (−3)	28 (−2)	30 (−1)	32 (0)	44 (7)	47 (8)	46 (8)	41 (5)	29 (−2)	26 (−3)	22 (−6)	22 (−6)
Average precipitation inches (mm)	3.12 (79)	3.37 (86)	2.45 (62)	0.74 (19)	0.26 (6.6)	0.03 (0.76)	0.09 (2.3)	0.10 (2.5)	0.23 (5.8)	0.45 (11)	1.32 (34)	2.14 (54)	14.30 (363)
Average precipitation days	7.2	7.4	5.5	3.7	1.5	0.3	0.9	1.0	1.2	2.2	4.2	6.4	41.7

== Demographics ==
Historical population
Census	Pop.	Note	%±
1950	1,584		—
1960	4,964		213.4%
1970	14,511		192.3%
1980	19,732		36.0%
1990	23,302		18.1%
2000	24,157		3.7%
2010	27,063		12.0%
2020	26,316		−2.8%
2024 (est.)	25,400	▼	−3.5%
U.S. Decennial Census

=== Racial and ethnic composition ===
Norco city, California – Racial and ethnic composition Note: the US Census treats Hispanic/Latino as an ethnic category. This table excludes Latinos from the racial categories and assigns them to a separate category. Hispanics/Latinos may be of any race.
Race / Ethnicity (NH = Non-Hispanic)	Pop 1980	Pop 1990	Pop 2000	Pop 2010	Pop 2020	% 1980	% 1990	% 2000	% 2010	% 2020
White alone (NH)	17,658	16,484	16,334	15,275	13,176	83.58%	70.74%	67.62%	56.44%	50.07%
Black or African American alone (NH)	408	1,770	1,468	1,858	1,563	1.93%	7.60%	6.08%	6.87%	5.94%
Native American or Alaska Native alone (NH)	374	124	112	150	140	1.77%	0.53%	0.46%	0.55%	0.53%
Asian alone (NH)	74	293	274	828	874	0.35%	1.26%	1.13%	3.06%	3.32%
Native Hawaiian or Pacific Islander alone (NH)	74	293	23	52	33	0.35%	1.26%	0.10%	0.19%	0.13%
Other race alone (NH)	22	75	24	28	127	0.10%	0.32%	0.10%	0.10%	0.48%
Mixed race or Multiracial (NH)	x	x	418	467	909	x	x	1.73%	1.73%	3.45%
Hispanic or Latino (any race)	2,590	4,556	5,504	8,405	9,494	12.26%	19.55%	22.78%	31.06%	36.08%
Total	21,126	23,302	24,157	27,063	26,316	100.00%	100.00%	100.00%	100.00%	100.00%

=== 2020 census ===
As of the 2020 census, Norco had a population of 26,316 and a population density of 1,899.2 inhabitants per square mile (733.3/km^{2}).

The median age was 40.9 years. 18.2% of residents were under the age of 18 and 14.9% of residents were 65 years of age or older. For every 100 females, there were 133.9 males, and for every 100 females age 18 and over there were 141.5 males age 18 and over.

The census reported that 84.4% of the population lived in households, 0.3% lived in non-institutionalized group quarters, and 15.2% were institutionalized. 100.0% of residents lived in urban areas, while 0.0% lived in rural areas.

There were 7,057 households in Norco, of which 34.9% had children under the age of 18 living in them. Of all households, 60.2% were married-couple households, 13.9% were households with a male householder and no spouse or partner present, and 19.8% were households with a female householder and no spouse or partner present. About 15.1% of all households were made up of individuals and 8.3% had someone living alone who was 65 years of age or older. The average household size was 3.15. There were 5,582 families (79.1% of all households).

There were 7,253 housing units at an average density of 523.5 units per square mile (202.1 units/km^{2}), of which 7,057 (97.3%) were occupied. Of occupied units, 81.8% were owner-occupied and 18.2% were occupied by renters. The homeowner vacancy rate was 0.7% and the rental vacancy rate was 2.2%.

=== 2023 ACS 5-year estimates ===
In 2023, the US Census Bureau estimated that 13.8% of the population were foreign-born. Of all people aged 5 or older, 68.2% spoke only English at home, 27.4% spoke Spanish, 0.9% spoke other Indo-European languages, 3.2% spoke Asian or Pacific Islander languages, and 0.2% spoke other languages. Of those aged 25 or older, 85.7% were high school graduates and 21.0% had a bachelor's degree.

The median household income in 2023 was $125,117, and the per capita income was $40,165. About 4.0% of families and 5.7% of the population were below the poverty line.

=== 2010 census ===
At the 2010 census Norco had a population of 27,063. The population density was 1,895.4 inhabitants per square mile (731.8/km^{2}). The racial makeup of Norco was 20,641 (76.3%) White (56.4% Non-Hispanic White), 1,893 (7.0%) African American, 248 (0.9%) Native American, 844 (3.1%) Asian, 59 (0.2%) Pacific Islander, 2,514 (9.3%) from other races, and 864 (3.2%) from two or more races. Hispanic or Latino of any race were 8,405 persons (31.1%).

The census reported that 22,666 people (83.8% of the population) lived in households, 75 (0.3%) lived in non-institutionalized group quarters, and 4,322 (16.0%) were institutionalized.

There were 7,023 households, 2,831 (40.3%) had children under the age of 18 living in them, 4,353 (62.0%) were opposite-sex married couples living together, 777 (11.1%) had a female householder with no husband present, 453 (6.5%) had a male householder with no wife present. There were 354 (5.0%) unmarried opposite-sex partnerships, and 61 (0.9%) same-sex married couples or partnerships. 1,030 households (14.7%) were one person and 458 (6.5%) had someone living alone who was 65 or older. The average household size was 3.23. There were 5,583 families (79.5% of households); the average family size was 3.53.

The age distribution was 5,488 people (20.3%) under the age of 18, 2,798 people (10.3%) aged 18 to 24, 7,854 people (29.0%) aged 25 to 44, 8,303 people (30.7%) aged 45 to 64, and 2,620 people (9.7%) who were 65 or older. The median age was 39.5 years. For every 100 females, there were 136.8 males. For every 100 females age 18 and over, there were 146.7 males.

There were 7,322 housing units at an average density of 512.8 per square mile, of the occupied units 5,702 (81.2%) were owner-occupied and 1,321 (18.8%) were rented. The homeowner vacancy rate was 1.9%; the rental vacancy rate was 3.8%. 18,572 people (68.6% of the population) lived in owner-occupied housing units and 4,094 people (15.1%) lived in rental housing units.

According to the 2010 United States Census, Norco had a median household income of $82,074, with 9.9% of the population living below the federal poverty line.

== Economy ==
=== Major employers ===
According to the city's 2025 Comprehensive Annual Financial Report, the top employers in the city are:

#	Employer	# of Employees
1	Naval Surface Warfare Center	2,077
2	Corona-Norco Unified School District	1,281
3	California Rehabilitation Center	1,034
4	Norco College	499
5	Target	179
6	Quick Crete Products	142
7	WinCo Foods	128
8	City of Norco	123
9	E-Z Up Instant Shelters	114
10	Hemborg Ford, Inc.	106

Since 2017, Norco has been the location for Circle D Ranch, the housing and training facility for Disneyland's horses, many of which are used to pull the horse-drawn streetcars of the park's Main Street Vehicles attraction. The Circle D Ranch employs 60 people.

== Culture ==
As a horse community, there are few sidewalks in the city of Norco; instead there are horse trails, and riders can ride to town and tie their horses at the many hitching rails and corrals placed close to businesses. Many horse-related associations are a part of the city, including the Norco Horsemen's Association and the Norco Junior Horsemen's Association.

Politics in Norco are also dominated by concerns about horses and animal-keeping versus suburbanization, a battle that has played out over development in the Norco Hills, an area that borders eastern Corona and Riverside. The original spirit of the town's incorporation was to promote "City living in a rural atmosphere". According to city ordinances, the architecture of Norco "shall reflect a desired Western theme," including qualities "described as rural, informal, traditional, rustic, low-profile and equestrian oriented".

Norco is the home of the Norco Animal Rescue Team.

In 2006, Norco began promoting itself as "Horsetown U.S.A." and received a federal trademark.

The largest event highlighting Norco's community and lifestyle is the annual Norco Fair, run by community volunteers. The Norco Fair runs over Labor Day Weekend, beginning on Thursday evening with the Miss Norco, Horsetown USA Contest and continues until Monday, finishing with a Labor Day Parade down 6th Street. Events included at the Fair are the rodeo, rodeo dance, calf dressing competition, pageants, exhibitions, cowboy poker, wild cow milking, snail races, talent show, pet parade, and "Family Fun Day".

== Government ==
In 2003, Norco became a charter city for the express purpose of protecting and preserving animal-keeping rights. The charter was not extensive; it maintained nearly all aspects of California's General Law provisions, diverging only in three areas: horse trails, lot size, and animal-keeping rights. To change any ordinances in Norco relating to those three topics requires a supermajority (four-fifths) vote of the City Council.

=== Representation ===
Federal:

- In the United States House of Representatives, Norco is in California's 41st congressional district, represented by Republican Ken Calvert.
- Democrats Adam Schiff and Alex Padilla represent California in the United States Senate.

State:

- In the California State Legislature, Norco is in the 32nd senatorial district, represented by Republican Kelly Seyarto, and in the 63rd Assembly district, represented by Republican Natasha Johnson.

Local:

- In the Riverside County Board of Supervisors, Norco is in the Second District, represented by Karen Spiegel.

=== Voting history ===
Norco is staunchly Republican in presidential elections.

Norco vote by party in presidential elections
Year	Democratic	Republican	Third Parties
2024	27.21% 3,155	70.65% 8,192	2.15% 249
2020	30.07% 3,754	66.45% 8,296	3.48% 434
2016	29.33% 2,895	65.71% 6,487	4.95% 489
2012	31.32% 2,837	66.79% 6,050	1.89% 171
2008	34.27% 3,114	64.00% 5,815	1.73% 157
2004	28.60% 2,497	70.35% 6,143	1.05% 92
2000	34.17% 2,518	62.52% 4,608	3.31% 244
1996	34.70% 2,330	51.72% 3,473	13.57% 911
1992	29.48% 2,333	41.33% 3,271	29.19% 2,310

== Infrastructure ==
=== Transportation ===
Interstate 15 bisects Norco, connecting the city to points south such as San Diego and to points north such as Ontario and Las Vegas.

The Riverside Transit Agency (RTA)'s Route 3 provides bus transit from Norco north to Eastvale and south to Corona at the Corona Transit Center, approximately one mile south of the city limits. Rail transportation to Los Angeles and Orange County is provided via the Corona-North Main station on Metrolink's 91/Perris Valley and Inland Empire–Orange County lines, also out of the Corona Transit Center.

=== Public safety ===
Norco contracts out for law enforcement services with the Riverside County Sheriff's Department through a regional station on Clark Avenue.

The city of Norco contracts for fire and paramedic services with the Riverside County Fire Department through a cooperative agreement with CAL FIRE.

== In popular culture ==
- In the Sons of Anarchy episode "Greensleeves", Nero buys his uncle's ranch in Norco as his retirement destination.

== See also ==
- Norco High School
- Norco shootout
