= 2008 California Golden Bears football team =

American college football season

2008 California Golden Bears football

Emerald Bowl champion

Emerald Bowl, W 24–17 vs. Miami (FL)
- Conference: Pacific-10 Conference

Ranking
- Coaches: No. 25
- Record: 9–4 (6–3 Pac-10)
- Head coach: Jeff Tedford (7th season)
- Offensive coordinator: Frank Cignetti Jr. (1st season)
- Offensive scheme: Pro-style
- Defensive coordinator: Bob Gregory (7th season)
- Base defense: 4–3
- Home stadium: California Memorial Stadium (Capacity: 71,799)

2008 Pacific-10 Conference football standings
	Conf.			Overall
Team	W		L	W		L
No. 3 USC $	8	–	1	12	–	1
No. 10 Oregon	7	–	2	10	–	3
No. 18 Oregon State	7	–	2	9	–	4
California	6	–	3	9	–	4
Arizona	5	–	4	8	–	5
Arizona State	4	–	5	5	–	7
Stanford	4	–	5	5	–	7
UCLA	3	–	6	4	–	8
Washington State	1	–	8	2	–	11
Washington	0	–	9	0	–	12
$ – Conference champion; Rankings from AP Poll

The 2008 California Golden Bears football team represented the University of California, Berkeley in the 2008 NCAA Division I FBS football season. They played their home games at California Memorial Stadium in Berkeley, California and are coached by Jeff Tedford.

The Bears' 2008 campaign was marked with diminished expectations, as all of California's offensive stars at their skill positions (DeSean Jackson, Lavelle Hawkins, Robert Jordan, Justin Forsett and Craig Stevens) graduated or declared for the NFL draft. Thus the Bears started the season unranked for the first time since 2003. Their 2008 season would confirm this ranking, as they would finish the season undefeated at home but would only win one game on the road. The Bears won their opening game at home against Michigan State 38–31 and eviscerated Washington State in Pullman 66–3, but fell to Maryland 35–27 in College Park. The Bears won two straight home games against Colorado State and Arizona State but fell in the desert to Arizona. Although the Bears still controlled their destiny in the Pac-10 after two more home wins against UCLA and Oregon, two close losses to Pac-10 champion contenders USC and Oregon State on the road put an end to those hopes. Cal reclaimed the Axe by beating Stanford 37–16 in the 111th Big Game and kept Washington's season winless with a 48–7 victory.

Cal finished the regular season 8–4 as Tedford claimed his seventh consecutive winning season for the Golden Bears and third unbeaten home record in five years. The team improved on its 2007 season record of 7–6 to 9–4 and spent most of the season unranked, breaking into the AP Top 25 three times only to get knocked out each time following a loss. The Bears accepted an invitation to take on the Miami Hurricanes at the 2008 Emerald Bowl, which they won 24–17.

== Preseason ==
The aftermath of Cal's tumble from potentially being ranked in 2007 led Tedford to declare open competition on all positions. This included at quarterback, where Tedford had come under extreme criticism from the media and Golden Bears fans alike for his decision-making the previous year. Both Nate Longshore and Kevin Riley appeared to be at a standstill through fall practice. But in a surprise move, the younger and less experienced Riley was named the starter for the season opener. However, Tedford indicated that the quarterback competition was not over, and that Longshore would also see action against Michigan State (he would appear in the second quarter).

Cal's offseason also was noted by the Kevin Hart controversy, where the small town offensive linemen would claim he had been recruited by the Golden Bears, although the athletic department claimed never to be involved with him. Hart would later admit he made the whole thing up.

== Schedule ==
Date	Time	Opponent	Rank	Site	TV	Result	Attendance	Source
August 30	5:00 p.m.	Michigan State*		California Memorial Stadium; Berkeley, CA	ABC	W 38–31	62,956	
September 6	3:30 p.m.	at Washington State		Martin Stadium; Pullman, WA	CSN	W 66–3	27,906	
September 13	9:00 a.m.	at Maryland*	No. 25	Byrd Stadium; College Park, MD	ESPN	L 27–35	49,527	
September 27	3:00 p.m.	Colorado State*		California Memorial Stadium; Berkeley, CA	CSN	W 42–7	63,970	
October 4	12:30 p.m.	Arizona State^{†}		California Memorial Stadium; Berkeley, CA	ABC	W 24–14	58,302	
October 18	7:00 p.m.	at Arizona	No. 22	Arizona Stadium; Tucson, AZ	CSN	L 27–42	48,372	
October 25	12:30 p.m.	UCLA		California Memorial Stadium; Berkeley, CA (rivalry)	ABC	W 41–20	64,653	
November 1	12:30 p.m.	No. 23 Oregon		California Memorial Stadium; Berkeley, CA	ABC	W 26–16	61,417	
November 8	5:00 p.m.	at No. 6 USC	No. 22	Los Angeles Memorial Coliseum; Los Angeles, CA	ABC	L 3–17	88,523	
November 15	12:30 p.m.	at Oregon State		Reser Stadium; Corvallis, OR	ABC	L 21–34	45,969	
November 22	12:30 p.m.	Stanford		California Memorial Stadium; Berkeley, CA (The Big Game)	ABC	W 37–16	70,089	
December 6	12:00 p.m.	Washington		California Memorial Stadium; Berkeley, CA	FSN	W 48–7	50,038	
December 27	5:00 p.m.	vs. Miami (FL)*		AT&T Park; San Francisco, CA (Emerald Bowl)	ESPN	W 24–17	42,268	
*Non-conference game; ^{†}Homecoming; Rankings from AP Poll released prior to the game; All times are in Pacific time

== Rankings ==
Ranking movements Legend: ██ Increase in ranking ██ Decrease in ranking — = Not ranked RV = Received votes т = Tied with team above or below
	Week																
Poll	Pre	1	2	3	4	5	6	7	8	9	10	11	12	13	14	15	Final
AP	RV	RV	23	RV	RV	RV	25	RV	RV	RV	21	RV	RV	RV	RV	RV	RV
Coaches Poll	RV	RV	25	RV	RV	RV	RV	22	RV	RV	22	RV	RV	RV	RV	RV	RV
Harris	Not released					RV	RV	24	RV	25T	21	25	RV	RV	RV	RV	Not released
BCS	Not released								—	—	21	—	—	—	—	—	Not released

== Game summaries ==
=== Michigan State ===
	1	2	3	4	Total
Spartans	0	7	7	17	31
Golden Bears	7	10	7	14	38

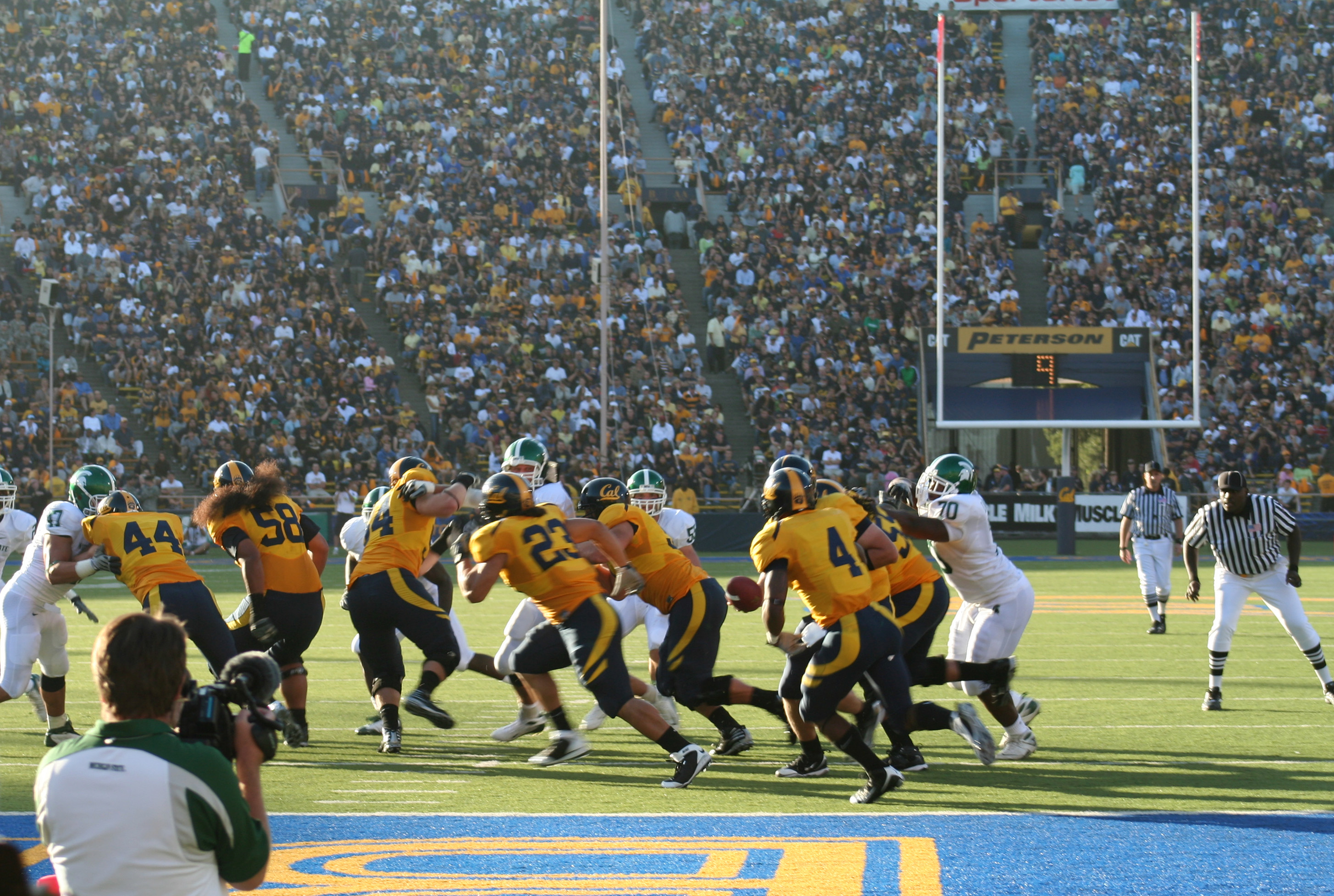
The ball is handed off to Jahvid Best

The Bears had last played the Spartans in Michigan in 2002, defeating them 46–22 in Tedford's first year as head coach. The two teams had only played each other three times in all before their 2008 meeting, with the Spartans winning the other two contests.

Both teams were scoreless until a blocked Spartans punt resulted in a Bears touchdown in the first quarter. Cal scored again on a field goal by freshman kicker David Seawright in the second quarter. Michigan State responded when Otis Wiley intercepted a Nate Longshore pass and returned it for a touchdown, while Cal was able to counter with a touchdown run by Jahvid Best prior to the end of the first half.

The second half saw both teams score back and forth. The Spartans struck first with a touchdown run by Javon Ringer, followed by Cal QB Kevin Riley connecting with Cameron Morrah for a touchdown. Ringer made his second touchdown run of the game in the fourth quarter, while Riley made his second touchdown pass of the game to Will Ta'ufo'ou. After a Spartans field goal, freshman running back Shane Vereen scored on an 81-yard touchdown run that gave the Bears their final score of the game. The Spartans countered with a touchdown pass from Brian Hoyer to Mark Dell to get within 7 points and had a chance to tie the game with seconds left, but Hoyer threw four straight incompletions from midfield.

Longshore, who lost the starting quarterback job to Riley, threw for 62 yards with 2 interceptions. Riley threw for 202 yards with 2 touchdowns. The game marked the first time that two Cal running backs had completed over 100 yards rushing since the 2006 Holiday Bowl, with Best at 111 yards and Vereen at 101, respectively. Spartans quarterback Hoyer finished with 321 yards passing, including a touchdown and an interception. Ringer, who completed 1,447 yards rushing during the 2007 season, was held to 81 yards, which included 2 touchdowns.

=== Washington State ===
	1	2	3	4	Total
Golden Bears	21	21	10	14	66
Cougars	3	0	0	0	3

The Cougars hosted the Bears in Pullman, Washington for the first conference game of the season for both teams as well as first year Cougars head coach Paul Wulff. Cal scored early, with Jahvid Best breaking free for an 80-yard touchdown run on the Bears' first possession. This was followed by an interception by Syd'Quan Thompson deep in Washington State territory, setting up a touchdown pass from Kevin Riley to Sean Young. Shane Vereen made a 39-yard touchdown run on the next possession for the Bears' third touchdown of the first quarter. A Cougar field goal would prove to be their only score for the game.

The Cougars had another chance at scoring in the second quarter, but had a field goal blocked that linebacker Zack Follett was able to return for a 65-yard touchdown. Riley was able to run in for a touchdown from 27 yards out, while Thompson made an 89-yard interception that set up another Best touchdown.

After the half, Nate Longshore led the Bears in the third quarter. The Cougars were intercepted in the Cal red zone, setting up an 86-yard touchdown run by Best. This marked the first time that Cal had two runs of more than 80 yards in a single game, as well as in a single season.

Cal used its commanding lead in the fourth quarter to give more of its backup players some experience. Following a touchdown by sophomore running back Tracy Slocum, freshman quarterback Brock Mansion was able to take his first career snap. An interception of a Cougars pass in WSU territory gave Mansion the opportunity to make his first rushing touchdown for the final score of the game.

Cal produced 505 total yards of offense (114 passing and 391 rushing) and allowed only 167 total yards (110 passing and 57 rushing) to the Cougars, who committed four turnovers. The game marked the first time since 1921 and 1923 that the Bears had won back to back games at Pullman. It was the Cougars' worst loss since a 1976 loss to UCLA 62–3 and the first time that WSU opened the season with two losses since 1999. Best had exactly 200 yards rushing on 14 carries for three touchdowns, the most by a Cal player since Justin Forsett had 235 against New Mexico State in 2005. He also became the first player since J.J. Arrington to start the season with consecutive 100-yard rushing games. The win enabled the Bears to get back into the AP Top 25 at #23.

=== Maryland ===
	1	2	3	4	Total
Golden Bears	3	3	0	21	27
Terrapins	14	7	7	7	35

Cal headed east for its second road game in a row in the first ever meeting between the Bears and the Terrapins with a noon kickoff. The Terrapins jumped out to an early lead and never relinquished it, with Da’Rel Scott scoring a rushing touchdown on their first possession. Kevin Riley was intercepted on the ensuing Cal possession, setting up another touchdown run by Scott. Terrapins quarterback Chris Turner threw a touchdown pass to open the second quarter. The Bears were limited to a pair of field goals in the first half, with a possible third one from 25 yards out bouncing off the left upright in the closing seconds of the second quarter. Maryland had only scored 21 points combined in their first two games.

In the third quarter, Cal recovered a Maryland fumble, but failed to score and turned the ball over on downs. Maryland extended its lead to 28–6 on a 28-yard touchdown strike from Turner to Darrius Heyward-Bey. Riley was sacked three times. Cal was shut out of the end zone until the fourth quarter, when Riley connected with Cameron Morrah. The Terrapins recovered the ensuing onside kick and was able to respond with a touchdown for their final score of the game. Riley threw two more touchdown passes to bring the Bears within 8 points, but Maryland recovered the ensuing onside kicks and Turner was able to end the game by taking three straight knees.

Jahvid Best, coming from back to back games with over 100 yards rushing, was held to 25 on ten carries, with the Bears producing only 38 net rushing yards. Riley passed for 423 yards on 58 attempts, a school record for the most pass attempts. Terrapins quarterback Turner passed for 156 yards and two touchdowns, while running backs Scott and Davin Meggett rushed for 87 and two touchdowns, and 82 yards and a touchdown, respectively. The Bears also gave up five sacks, the most since October 1, 2005 against Arizona. Humidity was cited as the biggest adjustment that Cal failed to make more so than the time change and Maryland's performance in its first two games. The loss brings the Bears' record to 3–7 in its last ten trips to the East Coast and also snapped a ten-game winning streak in the month of September.

=== Colorado State ===
	1	2	3	4	Total
Rams	0	0	0	7	7
Golden Bears	14	7	7	14	42

Although Cal struggled on pass offense and Cal's two running backs both committed a fumble early on, the defense and special teams put Cal on the board early in the first half. A Rams punt was blocked and Bryant Nnabuife ran it in for a touchdown, his second of the season. In the same quarter Cal's Brett Johnson intercepted Colorado State's Billy Farris' pass for a 43-yard touchdown.

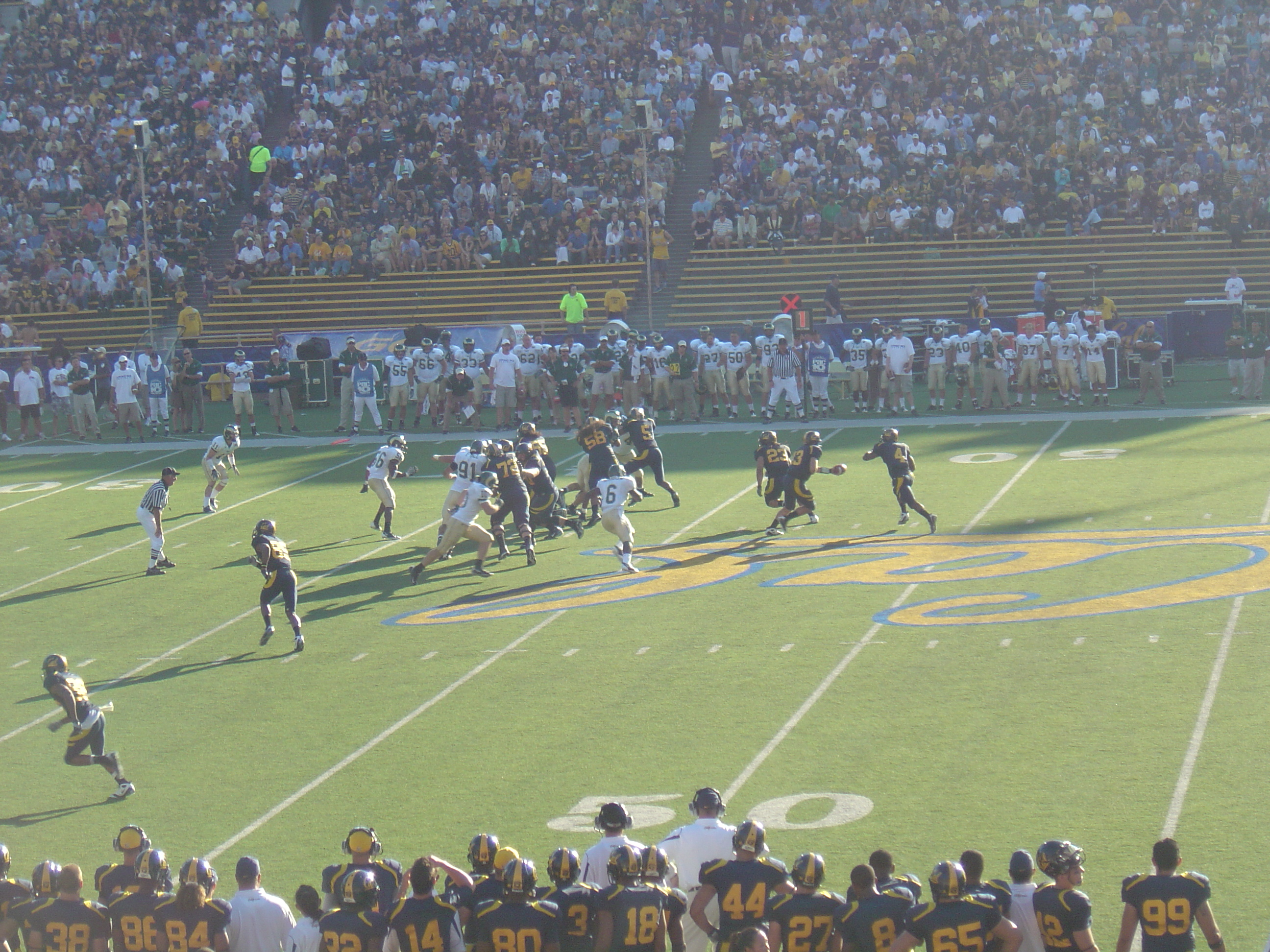
Riley hands the ball off to Best

In the second quarter Riley threw an 11-yard pass to Nyan Boateng for the score after a pass interference call on Colorado State gave Cal a first down. The defense was able to shut out Colorado State for another quarter.

In the third quarter Riley was replaced with Nate Longshore who was unable to produce any offense although running backs Jahvid Best and Shane Vereen were consistently gaining first downs. However Cal's special teams struck again as Syd'Quan Thompson ran a punt return for a touchdown.

In the fourth quarter, Cal's offense finally clicked when Longshore hit Jeremy Ross for an 11-yard touchdown and Cameron Morrah for another 16-yard touchdown. The Rams avoided being shut out with a 1-yard touchdown run by John Mosure that followed a long pass by backup quarterback Klay Kubiak. The final score was 42–7.

In addition to the struggles on offense, Cal's Jahvid Best walked off the field after dislocating his elbow following a tackle. X-rays showed that there were no fractures and an MRI revealed no ligament damage. Cal's Rulon Davis left after half-time with an undisclosed foot injury.

=== Arizona State ===
	1	2	3	4	Total
Sun Devils	0	7	7	0	14
Golden Bears	10	7	7	0	24

The Bears resumed conference play at home against the Sun Devils following a week off. Nate Longshore started for the Bears after Jeff Tedford had him and Kevin Riley compete for the starting position during the week. Cal took an early lead with a field goal in the first quarter followed by a touchdown pass from Longshore to LaReylle Cunningham that resulted from a fumble on the Sun Devils' first possession. Longshore threw an interception in the closing minutes of the first quarter, but the Sun Devils were unable to capitalize on it. The Bears struck again in the second quarter with a 22-yard touchdown pass to Cameron Morrah, to which the Sun Devils responded to with a 30-yard touchdown pass from Rudy Carpenter to Kyle Williams.

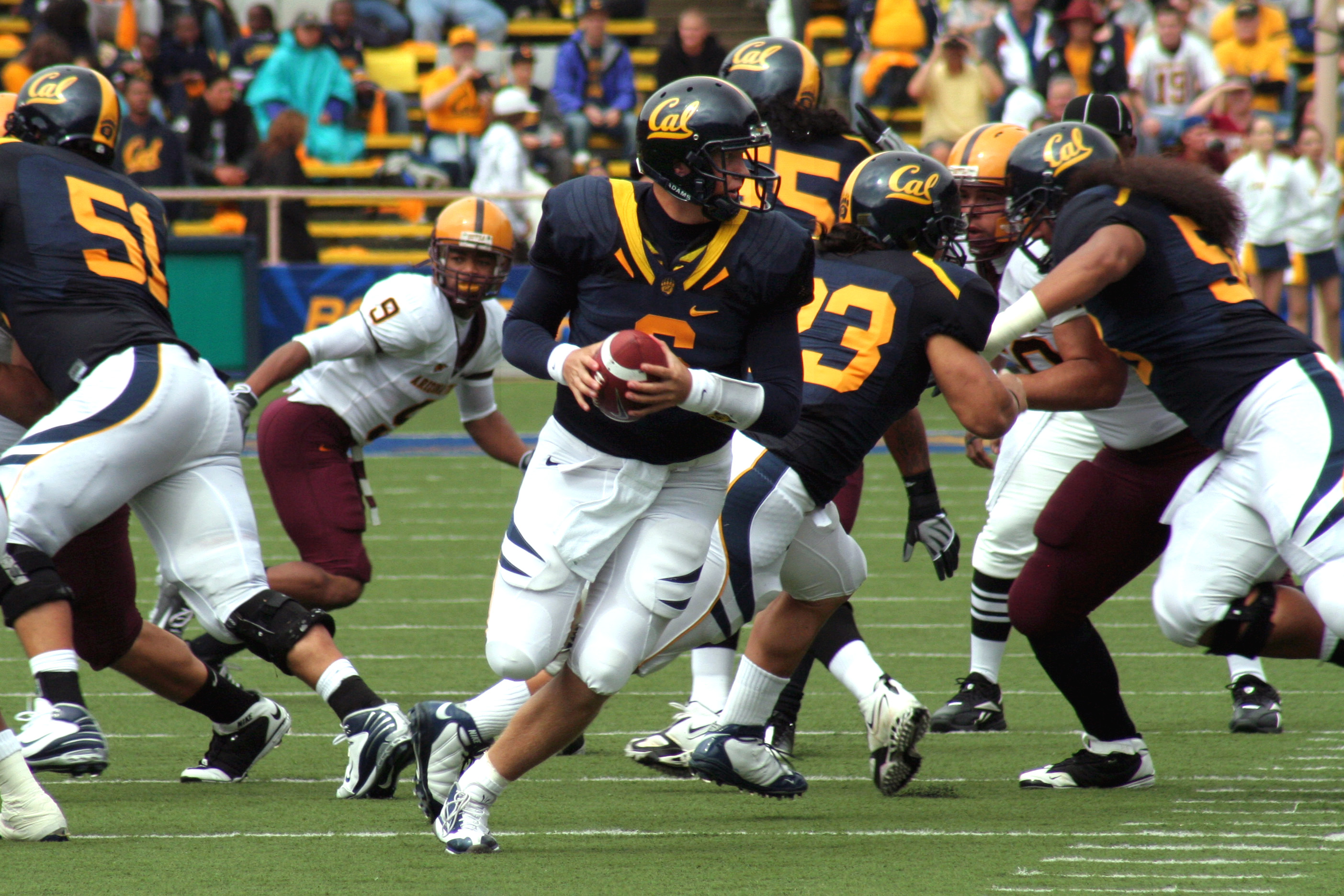
Longshore prepares to throw a pass

Cal scored first in the second half, when Longshore connected with Nyan Boateng for a touchdown. Cal was able to block a field goal attempt by Arizona State, but was penalized for jumping on the line, resulting in a first down. This set up the Sun Devils' final score of the game on an 8-yard run by Keegan Herring. The Bears defense was able to shut out the Sun Devils in the fourth quarter, intercepting Carpenter for a second time and forcing a fumble that forced them to punt. A Sun Devils field goal attempt in the final minute of the quarter missed. Cal only made one first down in the fourth quarter and spent the rest of the time successfully running out the clock.

Longshore finished with 198 yards, including three touchdowns and an interception, moving him up to fifth place on the Cal career touchdown list with 46. Running back Shane Vereen, stepping in for an injured Jahvid Best, had 93 yards rushing. Tight end Cameron Morrah caught his fourth touchdown pass of the season, the most by a tight end since Garrett Cross in 2004. Carpenter finished with 165 yards passing, including one touchdown pass and two picks. He injured his ankle in the final minutes and had to leave the game on crutches. The loss marks the Sun Devils' first three-game losing streak since Dennis Erickson's tenure as head coach. The victory allowed the Bears to break into the Coaches' Poll at #22 and AP Poll at #25 following a bye week.

=== Arizona ===
	1	2	3	4	Total
Golden Bears	7	17	3	0	27
Wildcats	0	14	28	0	42

The Bears put their new #25 ranking on the line against the Wildcats on the road, where they had lost in 2006, with Longshore getting his second start in a row for the season. Cal capitalized on a fumble by Arizona running back Nic Grigsby which set up a short pass from Longshore to Verran Tucker. The Wildcats responded in the second quarter with two touchdown runs in a row by freshman running back Keola Antolin of 20- and 11-yards, respectively. The Bears tied it up with a 67-yard by Jahvid Best, who played his first game since dislocating his left shoulder three weeks prior against Colorado State. Cal went ahead with an 18-yard touchdown reception by Cameron Morrah and a field goal to take a 24–14 lead at the half.

The Wildcats came storming back in the third quarter, starting with a 56-yard touchdown pass from Willie Tuitama to Mike Thomas. Antolin rushed for a touchdown for his third of the night, while Longshore was intercepted by Devin Ross less than a minute later for a 21-yard touchdown. Tuitama then hit Rob Gronkowski for a 35-yard touchdown and the final score of the game. By comparison, the Bears were only able to score on a lone field goal. Kevin Riley stepped in for Longshore during the fourth quarter but was unable to lead the Bears to a comeback, and both teams failed to score.

Best finished with 107 yards rushing, while Antolin ran for 149 yards, marking the first time that Cal had allowed a rusher to go for over 100 in the season. Longshore threw for 218 yards, including two touchdowns and one pick, while Riley threw for 97 yards and one interception. Tuitama threw for 225 yards, including two touchdowns and one interception, and was sacked four times. Wildcats receiver Mike Thomas had 104 receiving yards. The game marked the first time the Bears had allowed more than 40 points since UCLA had scored 47 at home on October 8, 2005.

=== UCLA ===
	1	2	3	4	Total
Bruins	0	10	3	7	20
Golden Bears	3	14	0	24	41

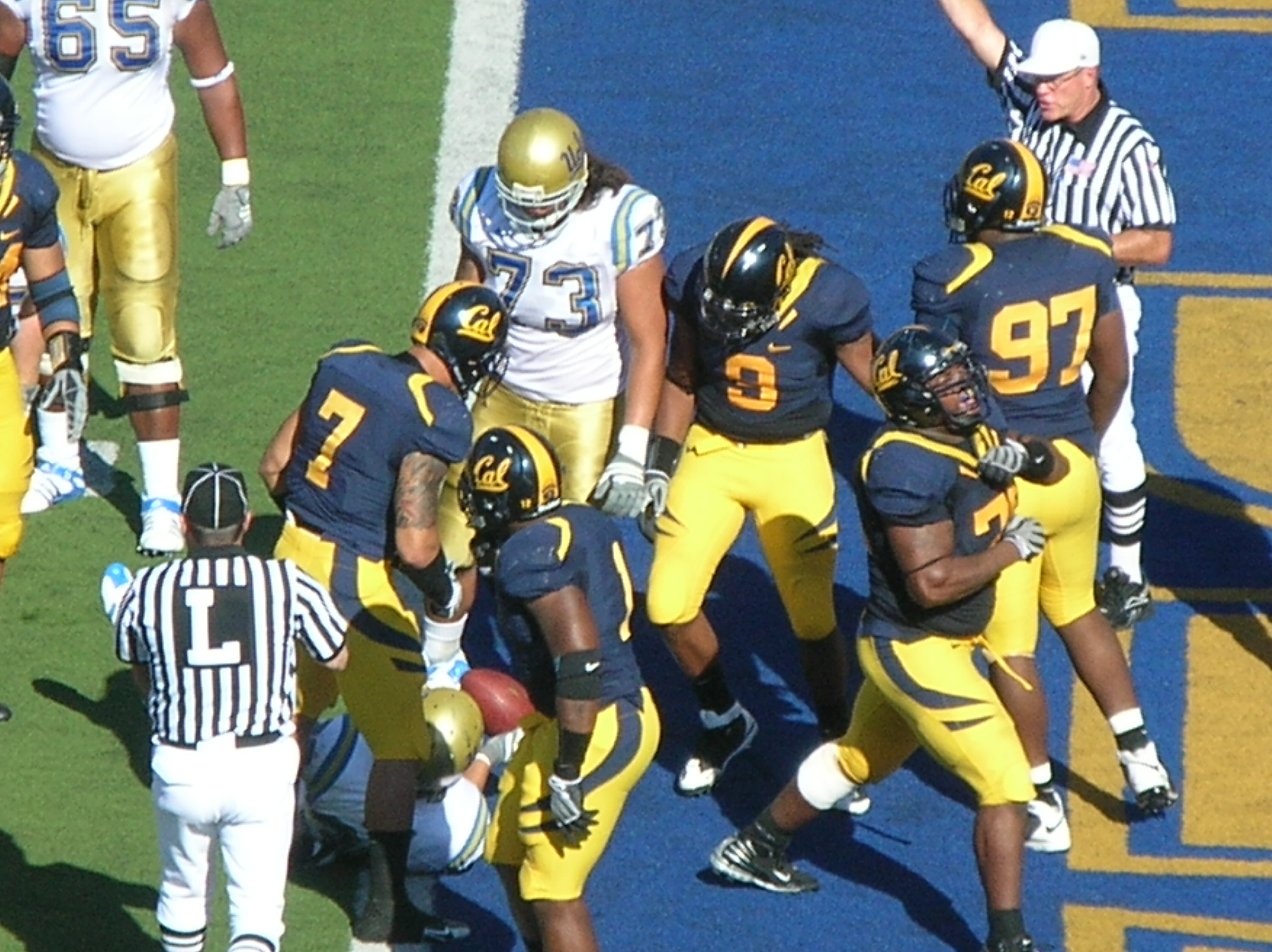
The Bruins are halted at the 1-yard line

The Bruins led the series, 49–28–1, on the Golden Bears. Kevin Riley started for the Bears, his first since nearly a month before against Colorado State on September 27. The Bruins took their only lead of the game at the beginning of the second quarter by managing to block a punt attempt by Bryan Anger and recovering the ball in the end zone to go up 7–3. On the ensuing possession Jahvid Best was able to break free for 34-yard run, the only offensive touchdown in the first half for the Bears. Marcus Ezeff then intercepted a pass by Bruins quarterback Kevin Craft which he was able to return for a 69-yard touchdown. Both teams then traded field goals into the fourth quarter. After getting a stop on a fake Bruins punt attempt, which nearly converted a 4th and 23 with a 22-yard pass, Riley hit Nyan Boateng for a 53-yard touchdown. Michael Mohamed then intercepted a Craft pass for a 19-yard score. Riley threw his second touchdown pass of the game on a ten-yard strike to Cameron Morrah. UCLA got in the final score of the game when backup quarterback Chris Forcier threw a nine-yard pass to Dominique Johnson, which was set up by a kickoff return by wide receiver Terrence Austin for 81 yards.

The victory continued Cal's win streak against UCLA at Memorial Stadium, having not lost to the Bruins at home since 1998. The Bears held the Bruins to 16 yards rushing, while Jahvid Best ran for 115 and Shane Vereen had 99. Riley passed for 153 yards and two touchdowns, although he was sacked three times. For the Bruins, Craft passed for 206 yards and was picked off four times, two coming off tipped balls.

=== Oregon ===
	1	2	3	4	Total
Ducks	6	0	10	0	16
Golden Bears	9	7	3	7	26

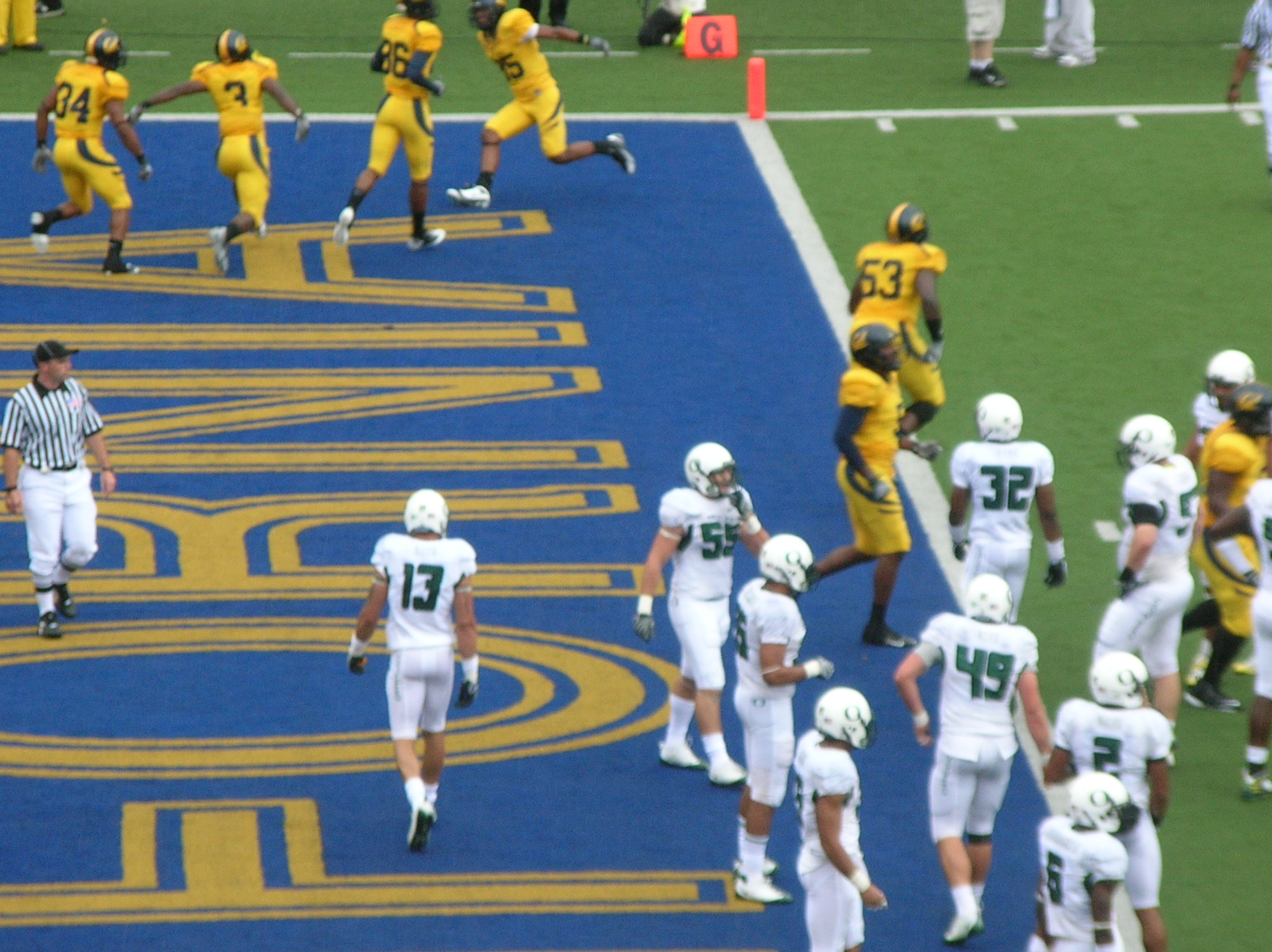
The Bears celebrate a touchdown in the first quarter

The Bears hosted the Ducks on a rainy day at Memorial Stadium with Riley as the starter. Oregon capitalized on an interception at midfield on Cal's first possession with a 17-yard run by quarterback Jeremiah Masoli with the PAT missing. The Bears responded quickly with a 22-yard pass from Riley to Jeremy Ross on the ensuing possession. Jahvid Best was able to break free for a 50-yard run from the Cal 20-yard line, but fumbled the ball in Ducks territory. The Bears held the Ducks and got a safety when Oregon snapped the ball high and into the end zone on a punt attempt. Cal took advantage of the free kick to advance down the field, during which Riley sustained a concussion when he failed to slide while attempting to gain a first down and was sandwiched between three defenders. He did not return to the game and Nate Longshore stepped into the game.

Best had his second fumble of the game in the second quarter, but Sean Cattouse then intercepted Masoli to negate it. The Bears fumbled again on a rushing attempt by Shane Vereen but the Ducks were stopped cold on a fourth down conversion attempt in Cal territory. The only score of the quarter was set up by a 50-yard interception return by Worrell Williams, capped off by a 2-yard pass from Longshore to Nyan Boateng.

Both teams traded field goals in third quarter until the Ducks blitzed down the field from their own 45-yard line and scored with three plays in 33 seconds on a 17-yard run by running back Jeremiah Johnson for their final score of the game. In the fourth quarter, Ducks cornerback Jairus Bryd fumbled a punt which was recovered by the Bears, allowing Vereen to score on a 2-yard run to put the game away.

Ducks running back Jeremiah Johnson went over the century mark with a 117 yards rushing, including a touchdown, the second rusher to do so against the Bears. Quarterback Jeremiah Masoli himself had 97 rushing yards, more than double his 44 passing yards, including a touchdown run. Longshore finished with a 136 passing yards including one touchdown, while Best had 93 rushing yards. Verran Tucker was the Bears' leading receiver with 83 yards. The Bears' five turnovers were the most since a November 12, 2005 matchup against USC, while Longshore moved up to fourth place in career passing touchdowns with 49 total. The upset victory allowed the Bears to break into the BCS rankings at #21. The Bears also got into the AP Top 25 at #21, their highest ranking thus far for the season and the third time they had done so after two road losses at Maryland and Arizona, both unranked at the time.

=== USC ===
	1	2	3	4	Total
Golden Bears	0	3	0	0	3
Trojans	3	7	0	7	17

The Bears headed south to face USC at home, putting their highest ranking of the year to date on the line against the #7 Trojans. Longshore got the start for the Bears and played for the first half, throwing two interceptions that were negated by penalties against the USC defense. The Bears held the Trojans to a field goal in the first quarter before marching down the field to respond with one of their own in the second, their only score of the game. Trojans quarterback Mark Sanchez, on the ensuing possession, then led USC on a 70-yard drive capped off by a 19-yard touchdown pass to Patrick Turner. Although the pass appeared on replays to have touched the ground, it was not overturned. The Trojans led the Bears 10–3 at the end of the half.

Kevin Riley stepped in at quarterback in an attempt to bring the Bears back in the second half. He hit Shane Vereen in the end zone on the Bears' first possession of the third quarter on a 27-yard strike, but the play was negated because of an illegal receiver downfield penalty; he was then intercepted on a tipped pass. Both defenses were then able to keep each side from scoring into the fourth quarter. The Trojans were then able to sustain a drive downfield that ended with a 6-yard pass from Sanchez to Ronald Johnson to put the game away.

The Trojan defense held the Bears to 165 net yards, while its offense produced more than double with 411. Sanchez threw for 238 yards, including two touchdowns, while Longshore went for 79 and Riley threw for 59. The Trojans also outrushed the Bears, putting up 173 and holding the latter to only 27. Jahvid Best was held to only 30 rushing yards on 13 carries. The Trojans won their sixth straight game of the year and their fifth straight game against the Bears.

=== Oregon State ===
	1	2	3	4	Total
Golden Bears	7	7	7	0	21
Beavers	14	3	10	7	34

The Bears traveled north to Corvallis, Oregon for their final road game of the season against the #23 Beavers, who had not yet lost a home game. Jahvid Best took the ensuing kickoff 51 yards to help set up a 5-yard pass from starter Kevin Riley. The Beavers immediately responded when James Rodgers returned the ensuing kickoff 86 yards for a touchdown, the first kickoff return for a score in the Pac-10. Oregon State extended its lead by taking advantage of a 56-yard punt return by Sammie Stroughter to set up a 2-yard run by freshman running back Jacquizz Rodgers and would not relinquish it. Cal scored in the second quarter on a trick play when Riley threw a lateral to Jeremy Ross, who then threw a 30-yard forward pass to Nyan Boateng to make it 17–14 Oregon State at the half.

The Beavers extended their lead in the third quarter with a field goal and 18-yard touchdown run by James Rodgers. Best was able to break free for a 65-yard touchdown run to keep the Bears within a score at 27–21. The Bears had a chance in the final minute of the fourth quarter to make a comeback, but were pinned at their own 6-yard line on a punt and were set back at the 3-yard line by a penalty. Riley was then intercepted by Keenan Lewis for a 25-yard touchdown to seal the victory for the Beavers.

Beavers quarterback Lyle Moevao threw for 145 yards, including one interception and a sack, while Jacquizz Rodgers rushed for 144 yards with one touchdown. Riley threw for 117 yards, was sacked five times, and was picked off once. Best ran for 116 yards, with one touchdown. The Bears would finish the season 1–4 on the road, their sole win coming against Washington State.

=== Stanford ===
	1	2	3	4	Total
Cardinal	0	3	0	13	16
Golden Bears	3	7	20	7	37

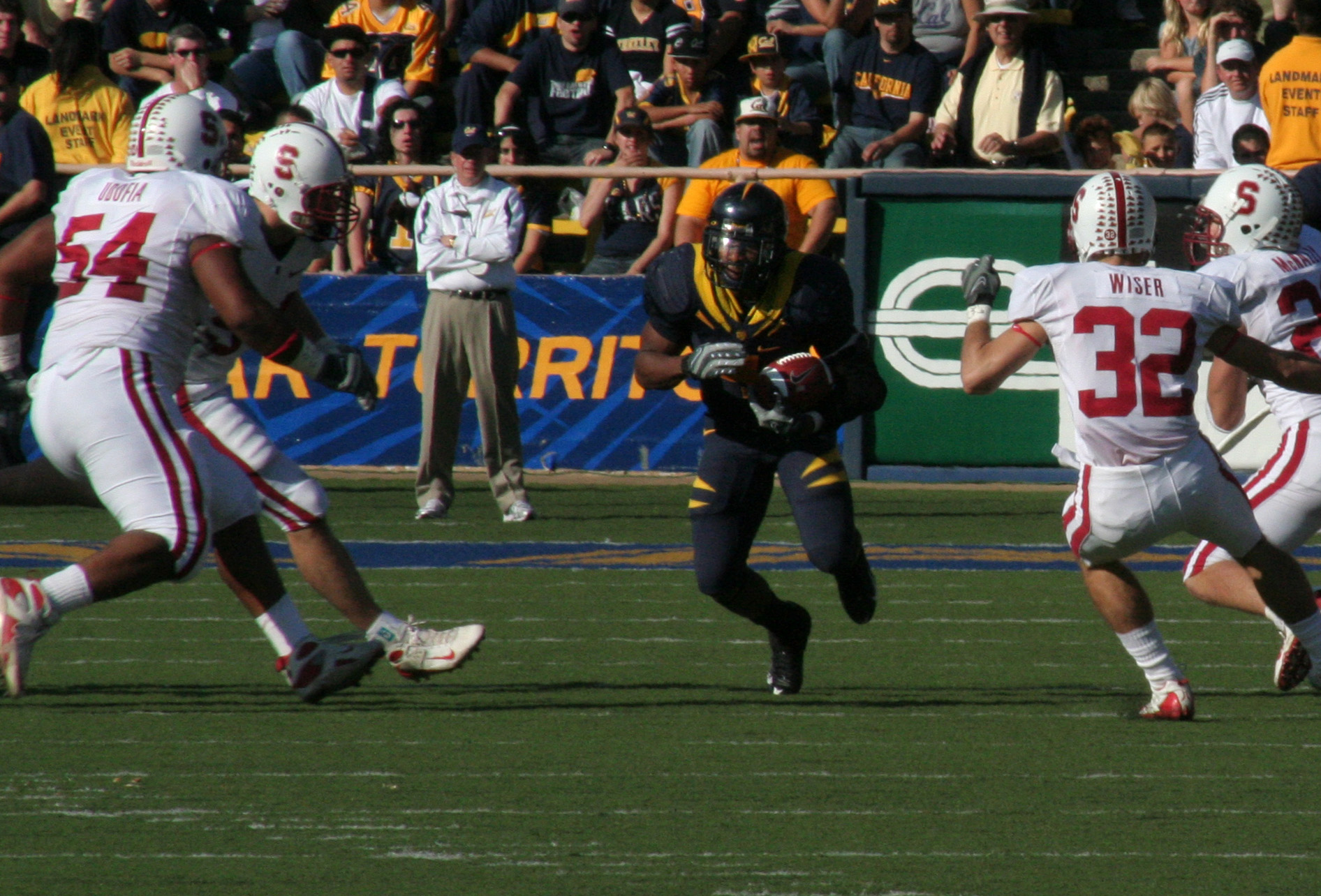
Jahvid Best running the ball against Stanford

Cal hosted Stanford for the 111th Big Game. The Cardinal had won the Axe back the previous year, snapping a five-game losing streak, and came in looking to get their sixth win to become bowl-eligible for the first time since 2001.

The Bears were able to score a field goal on their first possession, set up by a 60-yard run by Jahvid Best. A Cardinal attempt to tie the game with a field goal missed. Cal started a drive late in the first quarter that was halted early in the second when Bo McNally intercepted Kevin Riley on the Stanford 24-yard line. The Cardinal in turn were able to march downfield and were stopped when Cal forced running back Toby Gerhart to fumble and recovered at the Cal 11-yard line. Riley then threw his first touchdown pass of the day, a 59-yard strike to Shane Vereen. Stanford was unable to get into the end zone in the closing seconds of the third quarter with Cal halting Gerhart at the one-yard line and had to settle for a field goal to make the score 10–3 at the half.

The Bears exploded in the third quarter with three touchdowns in just over four minutes. First, The Bears intercepted Tavita Pritchard on the Stanford 40-yard line, setting up a touchdown pass from Riley to Cameron Morrah. They scored again on their next possession on a pass from Riley to Sean Young who then lateraled to Best for a 14-yard score. Best then ran in from a score on Cal's next possession, which was set up by a 42-yard run. The Bears shut down the Cardinal offense, sacking Pritchard three times in addition to intercepting him once. In the fourth quarter, Cal's final score came on a 45-yard run by Best. The Cardinal put up their first points since the first quarter on a 34-yard pass from Pritchard to Doug Baldwin. They successfully recovered an onside kick to score again on a 10-yard run by Gerhart. Pritchard was intercepted on Stanford's next possession on the Cal 27-yard line and then again in the final minutes of the quarter to seal the victory for Cal, with the crowd rushing the field in celebration.

The loss prevented Stanford from becoming bowl-eligible since 2001, Tyrone Willingham's final year as head coach. Pritchard outpassed Riley, throwing for 306 yards and a touchdown, while Gerhart ran for 103. Riley threw for 101 yards, including three scores, while Best ran for a career-high 201 yards and scored three times, becoming the seventh consecutive 1,000-yard rusher under Tedford.

=== Washington ===
	1	2	3	4	Total
Huskies	0	0	7	0	7
Golden Bears	10	21	14	3	48

The Bears played their final regular season game at home against the winless Huskies in Tyrone Willingham's final game as Washington head coach.

Cal scored on its first possession when Jahvid Best was able to break free for a 60-yard touchdown run. On the following possession the Bears were able to march downfield but missed a 30-yard field goal attempt. However Cal linebacker Zack Follett was able to sack Huskies quarterback Taylor Bean and force a fumble, which the Bears recovered, setting up a field goal from 23 yards.

Following an interception by the Golden Bears, Nate Longshore stepped in for Kevin Riley in the second quarter for his final regular season game at Cal; Best scored with a two-yard touchdown run, followed a 20-yard run. Longshore threw a 6-yard touchdown pass to Cameron Morrah with nine seconds left in the quarter to make the score at halftime 31–0. The Bear defense caused three Husky turnovers in the quarter.

In the third quarter, Best rushed for his final touchdown of the game on an 84-yard run. Shane Vereen stepped in at running back to relieve Best, who had rushed for a school record of 311 yards, surpassing a 54-year-old record held by Jerry Drew for 283 yards. Vereen was then able to score on a two-yard run. The Huskies got in their sole score of the game on a drive that consumed more than six minutes and culminated in a two-yard run by Bean. Cal then put in its backup players to finish the game, managing to prevent the Huskies from scoring in the fourth quarter.

Best's record-setting 311-yard rushing game was the fourth best performance in the FBS for the 2008 season and the fifth 300-yard rushing game in Pac-10 history. He finished the regular season with 1,394 yards rushing as the Pac-10 rushing leader, surpassing Oregon State's Jacquizz Rodgers who did not play the previous week in the Civil War against Oregon on November 29 due to injury. Longshore' 50th touchdown pass moved him up to fourth overall in touchdown passes for the Golden Bears. The Bears ended the regular season with 23 interceptions, the most since 1953.

The Bears' victory made their record at home perfect at 7–0 and made the Huskies the first 0–12 team in Pac-10 conference history and the only team in the country to finish the 2008 season without a victory. Washington's last win had been against Cal in Seattle in 2007. The Bears had 549 total net yards as opposed to the Huskies' 200, and outrushed them 431 to 104, with net passing yards closer at 118 to 96, respectively.

=== Emerald Bowl ===
	1	2	3	4	Total
Hurricanes	0	7	7	3	17
Golden Bears	14	0	3	7	24

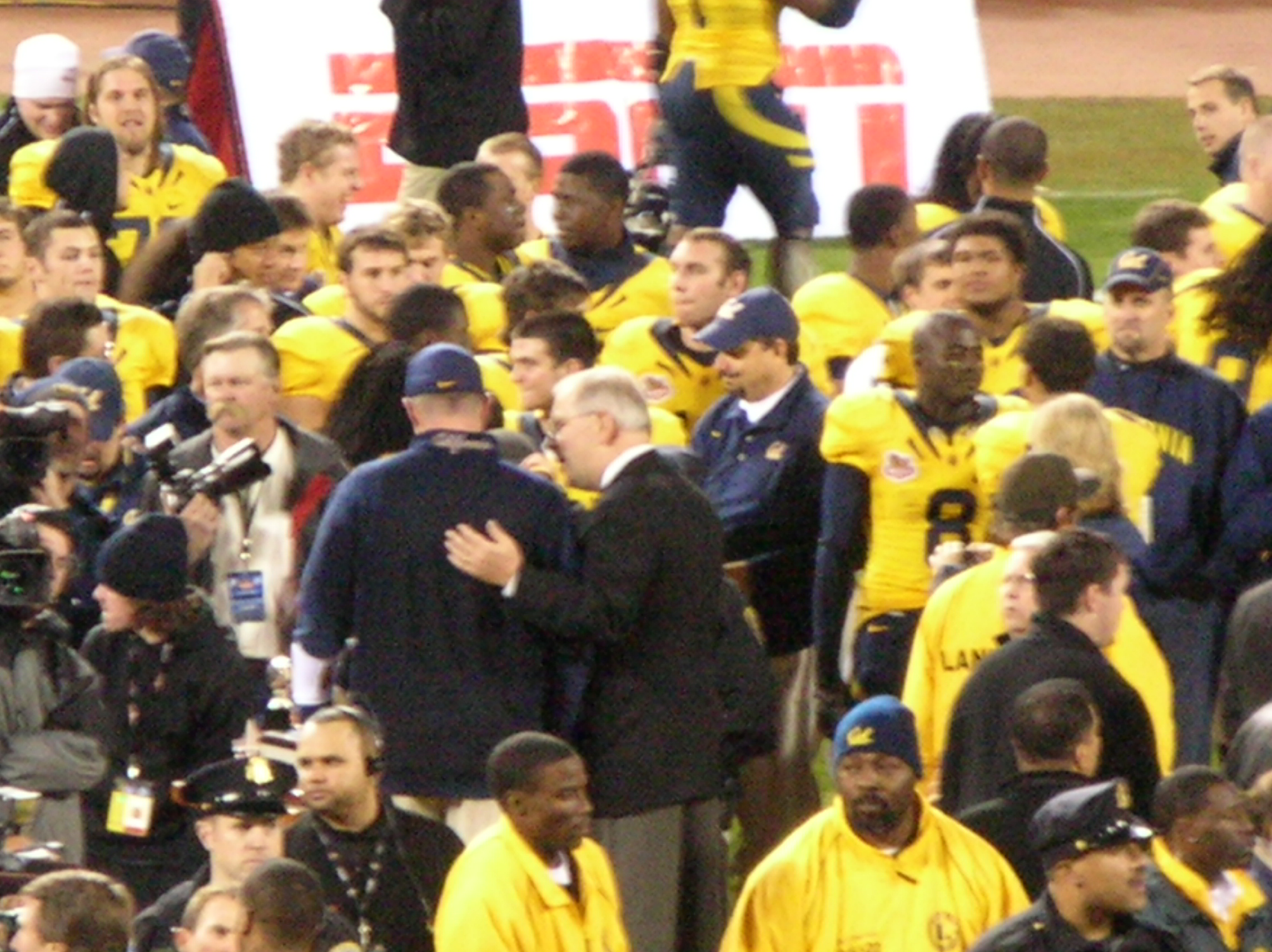
Jeff Tedford accepts the 2008 Emerald Bowl trophy

The Bears faced the Miami Hurricanes on December 27 in the Emerald Bowl at AT&T Park in San Francisco, California (just across the bay from Berkeley), marking the first appearance by either team in this bowl series. Longshore got the start over Riley for his final collegiate game. On the opposite side, Miami started freshman backup quarterback Jacory Harris after starter Robert Marve was suspended for academic reasons.

The Bears jumped out to an early 14–0 lead on two touchdown runs by Jahvid Best in the first quarter. However, the Hurricanes were able to score successive touchdowns on passes from Harris in the second and third quarters, while the Miami defense shut out the Cal offense in the second quarter and limited Cal's scoring in the third to a field goal. With the score tied at 17 apiece, late in the fourth quarter linebacker Zack Follett was able to force a fumble on Harris, which the Bears recovered. Longshore was able to connect with freshman tight end Anthony Miller for his 51st career touchdown pass and the go ahead score. Best earned Offensive MVP honors, while Follett was named the Defensive MVP.

== Aftermath ==
Cameron Morrah decided to forgo his senior season and declared for the NFL draft. He was invited to the NFL Combine alongside Rulon Davis, Anthony Felder, Zack Follett, Alex Mack, and Worrell Williams.

Following the departure of offensive coordinator Frank Cignetti for Pittsburgh, he was replaced by Andy Ludwig, who helped guide the Utah Utes to a perfect 13–0 season as offensive coordinator. Ludwig had previously worked alongside Cal head coach Jeff Tedford at Oregon and Fresno State, becoming the fifth offensive coordinator at Cal in five years.

== Players ==
=== Depth chart ===
These were the primary starters and backups through the 2008 season.

Mitchell Schwartz started all 13 games and was named a second-team Freshman All-American by College Football News, received the Bob Tessier Award as Cal's Most Improved Offensive Lineman, and received honorable mention Pac-10 All-Academic honors.

Defense

FS
Brett Johnson
Jesse Brooks

OLB	ILB	ILB	SLB
Zack Follett	Worrell Williams	Anthony Felder	⋅
Devin Bishop	D.J. Holt	Charles Johnson	⋅

SS
Marcus Ezeff
Sean Cattouse

CB
Darian Hagan
Chris Conte

DE	NT	DE
Rulon Davis	Derrick Hill	Tyson Alualu
Cameron Jordan	Mika Kane	Keith Browner

CB
Syd'Quan Thompson
Charles Amadi

Offense

WR
Verran Tucker
Jeremy Ross

LT	LG	C	RG	RT
Mitchell Schwartz	Mark Boskovich	Alex Mack	Justin Cheadle	Donovan Edwards
Donovan Edwards	Justin Cheadle	Richard Fisher	Noris Malele	Matt Summers-Gavin

TE
Cameron Morrah
Tad Smith

WR
Nyan Boateng
LaReylle Cunningham

QB
Kevin Riley
Nate Longshore

Key reserves
QB Brock Mansion
RB Tracy Slocum
WR Sean Young
TE Anthony Miller
DB Bryant Nnabuife

FB
Will Ta'ufo'ou
Zach Smith

RB
Jahvid Best
Shane Vereen

=== Roster ===
(as of October 27, 2008)
Wide receivers: 1 Marvin Jones – Freshman; 2 Charles Satchell – Freshman; 3 Jeremy Ross^{†} – Sophomore; 8 Nyan Boateng^{†} – (redshirt) Junior; 18 Drew Glover – Senior; 19 Jarrett Sparks – Freshman; 21 Ian Albrecht – (redshirt) Freshman; 46 Cooper Miller – Freshman; 82 Alex Lagemann – (redshirt) Freshman; 84 Michael Calvin – (redshirt) Freshman; 85 LaReylle Cunningham – Junior; 86 Verran Tucker^{†} – Junior; 87 Alex Stroud – Junior; 88 Sean Young – Senior; Offensive line: 51 Alex Mack^{†} – Senior; 52 Justin Gates – (redshirt) Freshman; 53 Donovan Edwards^{†} – Sophomore; 54 Chris Guarnero – Sophomore; 55 Noris Malele^{†} – Senior; 57 Todd Huber – (redshirt) Freshman; 58 Chet Teofilo – Junior; 61 Justin Cheadle^{†} – (redshirt) Freshman; 65 Dominic Galas – Freshman; 66 Eric Levy – Junior; 70 Mark Boskovich^{†} – Sophomore; 71 Sam DeMartinis – (redshirt) Freshman; 72 Mitchell Schwartz^{†} – (redshirt) Freshman; 73 Richard Fisher – Sophomore; 74 T.J. Emery – Freshman; 75 Matt Summers-Gavin – (redshirt) Freshman; 76 Matt Laird – Junior; 77 Tyler Rigsbee – Freshman; 78 Justin Prueitt Sophomore; 79 Mike Tepper – Senior; Tight ends: 5 Cameron Morrah^{†} – Junior; 44 Tad Smith – Junior; 45 Spencer Ladner – Freshman; 80 Anthony Miller – Freshman; 83 Skylar Curran – Junior; 89 Garry Graffort – Sophomore; 99 Savaiʻi Eselu – (redshirt) Freshman	Quarterbacks: 6 Nate Longshore – Senior; 9 Beau Sweeney – Freshman; 10 Brock Mansion – (redshirt) Freshman; 13 Kevin Riley^{†} – Sophomore; 14 Ryan Wertenberger – Freshman; Running backs: 4 Jahvid Best^{†} – Sophomore; 22 Tracy Slocum – Sophomore; 28 Covaughn DeBoskie – Freshman; 34 Shane Vereen – (redshirt) Freshman; 37 Langston Jackson – Freshman; Fullbacks: 23 Will Ta'ufo'ou^{†} – Senior; 27 Zach Smith – Senior; 31 John Tyndall – (redshirt) Freshman; 33 Brian Holley – Junior; 36 Will Kapp – (redshirt) Freshman; 38 Peter Geurts – (redshirt) Freshman; Defensive ends: 40 Aaron Tipoti – (redshirt) Freshman; 47 Keith Browner – Sophomore; 54 Justin Gates – (redshirt) Freshman; 55 Sean Brown – Freshman; 91 Cody Jones – Junior; 94 Rulon Davis^{†} – Senior; 95 Ernest Owusu – (redshirt) Freshman; 97 Cameron Jordan^{†} – Sophomore; Defensive tackles: 44 Tyson Alualu^{†} – Sophomore; 92 Trevor Guyton – Freshman; 98 Mika Kane – Senior; More Defensive Line: 50 Kevin Bemoll – Junior; 76 Derrick Hill – Sophomore; 77 Michael Costanzo – Sophomore; 96 Kendrick Payne – Freshman	Linebackers: 1 Worrell Williams^{†} – Senior; 3 D.J. Holt – (redshirt) Freshman; 7 Anthony Felder^{†} – Senior; 9 Eddie Young^{†} – Sophomore; 10 Devin Bishop – Junior; 18 Mike Mohamed – Sophomore; 30 Mychal Kendricks – Freshman; 37 Robert Mullins – Freshman; 39 Matt Russi – Junior; 42 Shea McIntyre – Junior; 43 Charles Johnson – (redshirt) Sophomore; 45 Nick Rosato – Freshman; 48 Eric Stevens – Freshman; 56 Zack Follett^{†} – Junior; 90 Solomona Aigamaua – (redshirt) Freshman; Defensive backs: 5 Syd'Quan Thompson^{†} – Junior; 15 Bryant Nnabuife – Sophomore; 16 Kevin Lewis – Freshman; 17 Chris Conte – Sophomore; 21 Marc Anthony – Freshman; 23 Josh Hill – Freshman; 24 Tyre Ellison – Freshman; 25 Brett Johnson^{†} – Junior; 26 Darian Hagan^{†} – Sophomore; 27 Charles Amadi – Sophomore; Safeties: 2 Bernard Hicks – Senior; 7 Robert Peele – Sophomore; 8 D.J. Campbell – (redshirt) Freshman; 11 Sean Cattouse^{†} – (redshirt) Freshman; 13 Chris Little – Freshman; 20 Jesse Brooks – Junior; 28 Kenny Frank – Senior; 29 Marcus Ezeff – Junior; Punters: 19 Bryan Anger – (redshirt) Freshman; 35 Ryan Theimer – (redshirt) Freshman; Kickers: 14 Nick Demopoulos – Sophomore; 30 Joe Robles – Sophomore; 34 Jordan Kay – Senior; 40 Giorgio Tavecchio – Freshman; 46 David Seawright – Freshman; Long snapper: 50 Matt Rios – Freshman; 68 Nick Sundberg^{†} – Junior
† Projected starter at position * Injured; will not play in 2008.
