= Syd'Quan Thompson =

American football player (born 1987)

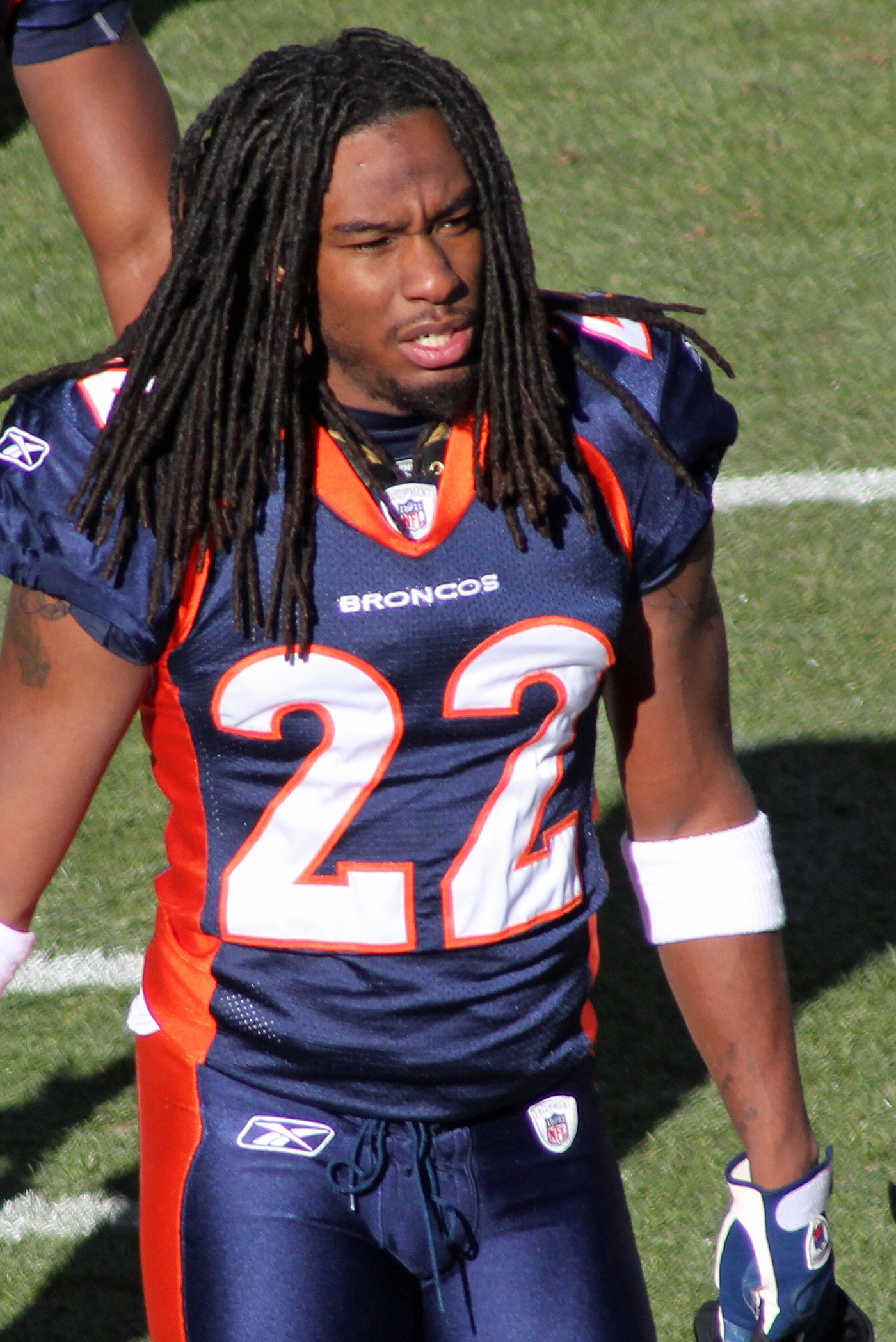
- Thompson with the Denver Broncos in 2011

No. 22
- Position: Cornerback

Personal information
- Born: February 7, 1987 (age 39); Sacramento, California, U.S.
- Listed height: 5 ft 9 in (1.75 m)
- Listed weight: 191 lb (87 kg)

Career information
- High school: Grant Union (Sacramento)
- College: California
- NFL draft: 2010: 7th round, 225th overall pick

Career history

Playing
- Denver Broncos (2010–2012); San Jose SaberCats (2014)*; Orlando Predators (2014)*; Los Angeles Kiss (2014)*
- * Offseason or practice squad member only

Coaching
- Grant Union HS (CA) (2022–present) Co-head coach

Awards and highlights
- Third-team All-American (2009); 2× First-team All-Pac-10 (2008, 2009); Sporting News All-Pac-10 freshman team (2006)

Career NFL statistics
- Total tackles: 18
- Fumble recoveries: 1
- Pass deflections: 4
- Interceptions: 2
- Stats at Pro Football Reference

Syd'Quan Tramele Thompson (born February 7, 1987) is an American former professional football player who was a cornerback for the Denver Broncos of the National Football League (NFL). He played college football for the California Golden Bears and was selected by the Broncos in the seventh round of the 2010 NFL draft.

Since 2022, Thompson has served as co-head coach of his alma mater, Grant Union High School in Sacramento, California. He has led the Pacers to two CIF state championships.

== Early life ==
Thompson was born in Sacramento, California. He attended Grant Union High School where he played football and earned all-state honors three times. As a junior in 2004, he recorded 950 rushing yards for 18 touchdowns, 15 receptions for 360 yards and four touchdowns, returned five punts, and returned one kickoff for a touchdown. That year, Rivals.com ranked him the number-one junior player in the state, and he received the California Mr. Football Award. As a senior, he recorded more than 70 tackles, two interceptions, 1,000 rushing yards, and 12 touchdowns. The Sacramento Bee named him to its all-metro second team.

Scout.com rated him the number-five player in its West Hot 100. Rivals.com rated him the 13th-ranked athlete in the nation and the 21st-ranked player in California. ESPN assessed him as the 11th-ranked cornerback in the nation. PrepStar named him an All-American, as did SuperPrep, which also rated him the 17th-ranked defensive back in the nation and the 13th-ranked player in California. Thompson was rated a four-star prospect by both Scout.com and Rivals.com. He received scholarship offers from Arizona, California, Kansas State, Oklahoma, Oregon, UCLA, and Washington.

== College career ==
=== 2005–2007 seasons ===
Thompson enrolled at the University of California, Berkeley where he majored in social welfare. He sat out the 2005 season as a redshirt. In 2006, starting cornerback Tim Mixon suffered a knee injury before the season, which forced Thompson to fill in that role for the remainder of the season. In the season-opener against Tennessee, Thompson played with a cast because of a broken wrist and was twice outpaced by All-American wide receiver Robert Meachem for touchdown receptions. Tennessee won, 35–18. Thompson started all 13 games of the season, and he recorded 60 tackles including 35 solo, two fumble recoveries including one returned for a touchdown against Stanford, and one interception. The Sporting News named him to its freshman All-Pac-10 team. In 2007, Thompson again started all 13 games and recorded 78 tackles including six for loss, ten broken-up passes, and one interception.

=== 2008 season ===
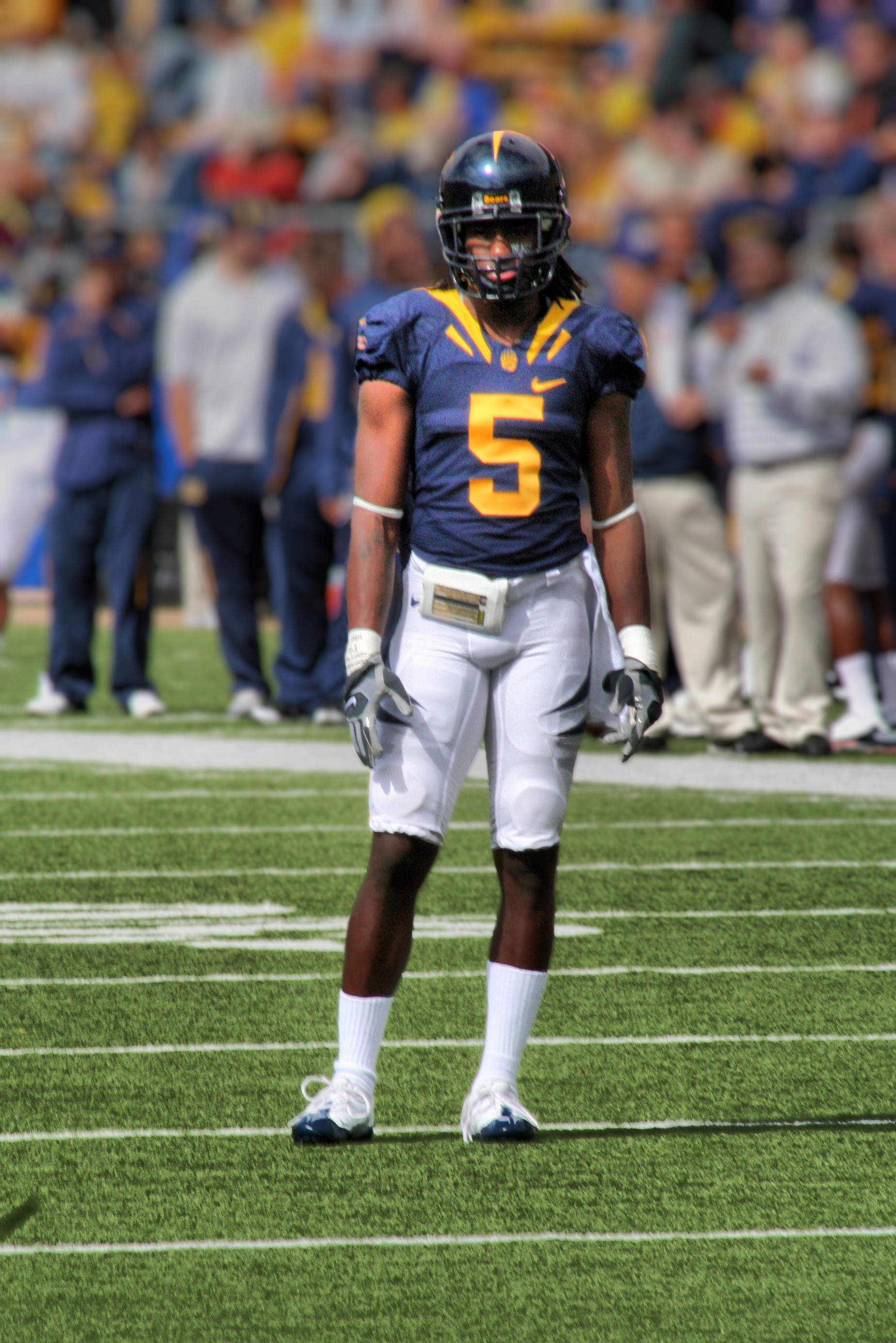
Thompson in October 2008

In 2008, he started in all 13 games at cornerback and as served as the punt returner. He recorded four interceptions for 128 yards and 18 passes defended. Against Washington State, he set a school single-game record with 108 interception return yards. In that game, he intercepted one pass and returned it 90 yards, before being caught by Washington State running back Christopher Ivory five yards short of the goal line. California scored on its ensuing possession, but Thompson reported he was teased by his teammates and asserted that he "was good for the first 40 yards, but then my back and my hip started tightening up". Against Colorado State, he returned a punt 73 yards for a touchdown, for which he was named the Pac-10 Special Teams Player of the Week. Thompson was named to the All-Pac-10 first team.

=== 2009 season ===
Prior to the 2009 season, Thompson was named a preseason All-American by Athlon Sports, The Sporting News, and other national publications. The Austin-American Statesman and ESPNU considered Thompson key to a strong California secondary. One teammate, California linebacker Worrell Williams, said in an interview with the San Francisco Chronicle that Thompson would "shut down one side of the field when he's out there."

Rob Rang of NFL Draft Scout rated Thompson 15th of its Top 32 seniors for the 2009 season, and wrote: "His straight-line speed, agility, reliable open-field tackling and natural return skills would be earning significantly more attention from the national media if he played in the Big Ten or SEC." The NFL Draft Scout assessed him as the best cornerback out of the 226 available for the 2010 NFL draft and projected him as a first or second round selection. Following his senior season, Thompson represented Cal at the 2010 Senior Bowl.

== Professional career ==
Pre-draft measurables
Height	Weight	Arm length	Hand span	40-yard dash	10-yard split	20-yard split	20-yard shuttle	Three-cone drill	Vertical jump	Broad jump
5 ft 9 1/4 in (1.76 m)	186 lb (84 kg)	31 in (0.79 m)	9 3/8 in (0.24 m)	4.75 s	1.65 s	2.72 s	4.26 s	6.73 s	33.0 in (0.84 m)	9 ft 9 in (2.97 m)
All values from NFL Combine/Pro Day

=== Denver Broncos ===
Thompson was selected in the seventh round of the 2010 NFL draft by the Broncos as the 225th overall selection. He recorded his first NFL interception against the New York Jets on October 17, 2010.

On September 2, 2011, during the Broncos' last preseason game at the Arizona Cardinals, Thompson suffered a ruptured Achilles tendon, and missed the entire 2011 season. Thompson was released from the Denver Broncos roster during the roster cuts before the 2012 regular season.

=== San Jose SaberCats ===
Thompson was assigned to the San Jose SaberCats, of the Arena Football League, on November 1, 2013.

=== Orlando Predators ===
On February 3, 2014, Thompson was traded, along with Quentin Sims and Andre Freeman, to the Orlando Predators for Simeon Castille.

=== Los Angeles Kiss ===
On February 6, 2014, Thompson was traded, along with Matt Spanos, to the Los Angeles Kiss.

== Coaching career ==
In 2022, Thompson was named co-head coach of his alma mater, Grant Union High School in Sacramento, California, alongside Carl Reed. Thompson and Reed led the Pacers on a turnaround from an 0–9 2021 season, culminating in winning the California Interscholastic Federation (CIF) Division 3-AA championship. The championship was Grant's second in program history.

After losing the Division 2-AA championship game in 2023, Thompson, Reed, and the Pacers won the 2024 Division 2-AA title for their second state triumph in three years.

== Personal life ==
Thompson's younger brother Shaq also played in the NFL. Syd'Quan has two children.

== Head coaching record ==
Year	Team	Overall	Conference	Standing	Bowl/playoffs
Grant Union Pacers (Sacramento Metropolitan Area League) (2022–present)
2022	Grant Union	12–2	5–1	1st	W CIF Division 3-AA Championship
2023	Grant Union	12–3	5–1	1st	L CIF Division 2-AA Championship
2024	Grant Union	12–3	5–0	1st	W CIF Division 2-AA Championship
Grant Union:		36–8	15–2		
Total:		36–8			
