= Nate Longshore =

American football player (born 1986)

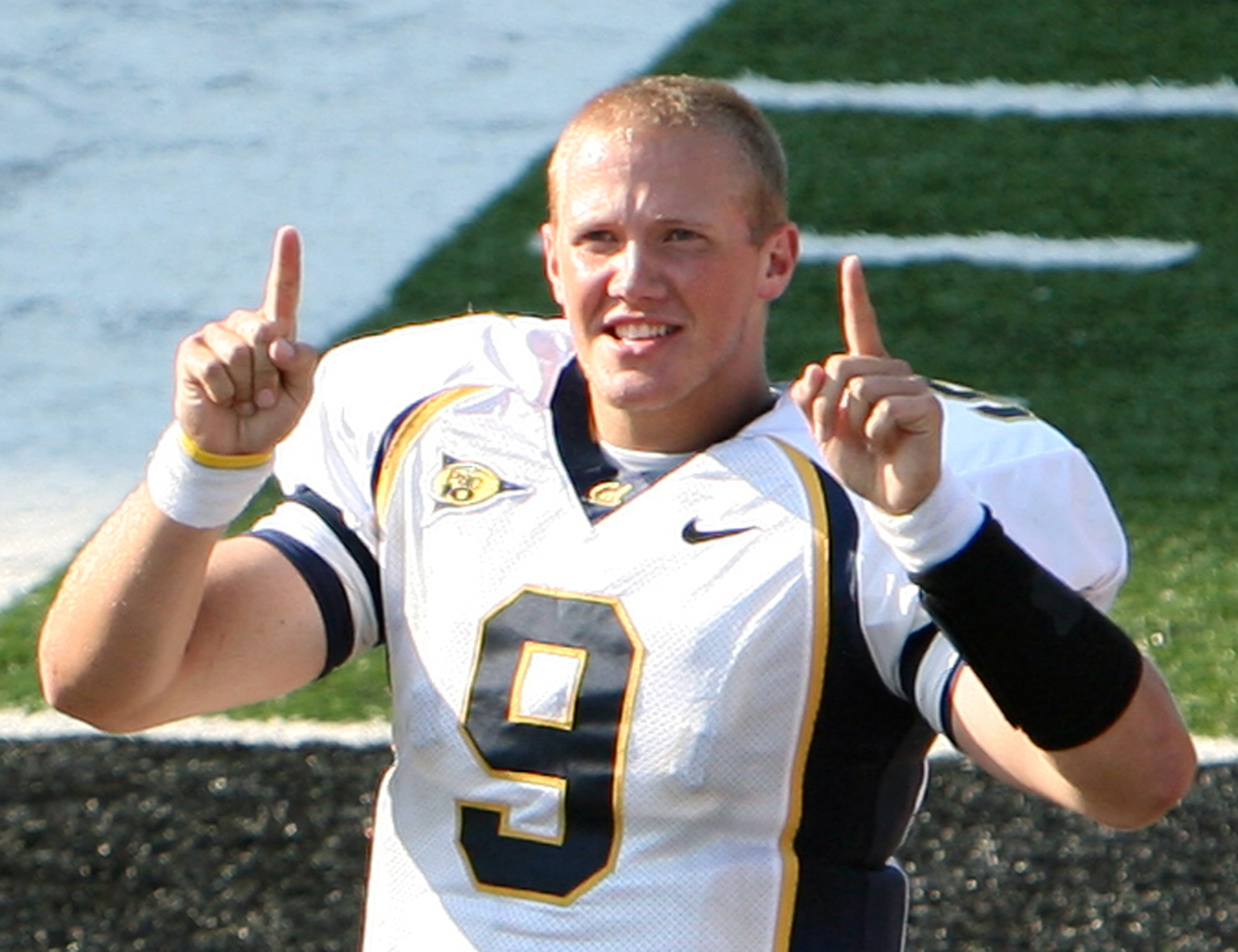
- Longshore with the California Golden Bears in 2006

Personal information
- Born: June 30, 1986 (age 40); Santa Clarita, California, U.S.
- Listed height: 6 ft 3 in (1.91 m)
- Listed weight: 233 lb (106 kg)

Career information
- High school: Canyon (Santa Clarita)
- College: California (2004–2008)
- NFL draft: 2009: undrafted

Career history

Playing
- San Jose SaberCats (2011)*
- * Offseason or practice squad member only

Coaching
- Santa Margarita Catholic High School (Assistant) (2010–2014); St. Margaret's Episcopal School (OC) (2018); Faith Lutheran High School (OC) (2019); UNLV (Analyst) (2020); UNLV (TE) (2021–2024)

Awards and highlights
- Holiday Bowl Offensive MVP (2006)

Nathan Dean Longshore (born June 30, 1986) is an American former college football player who was a quarterback for the California Golden Bears of the University of California, Berkeley, where he was a three-year starter and led the Golden Bears to a share of the Pacific-10 Conference championship in 2006.

== Early life ==
Longshore graduated from Canyon High School in 2004. He set ten school passing records and rang up 6,750 yards and 64 touchdown passes during his career. Rivals.com rated him the No. 8 "pro-style" quarterback in the nation and the 17th-best overall player in California.

== College career ==
=== 2005 ===
After redshirting his freshman year, Longshore was chosen to succeed Aaron Rodgers, who left for the NFL, to be California's starting quarterback. Longshore's 2005 season ended in the season's first game with a fibula injury and ligament damage in his ankle against Sacramento State. Joe Ayoob took over starting duties for Longshore.

=== 2006 ===
Longshore entered spring practice in 2006 in a heated battle for the starting quarterback job with veteran senior Joe Ayoob. During fall practice, head coach Jeff Tedford named Longshore the starting quarterback the week leading up to Cal's season opener at Tennessee. Coach Jeff Tedford particularly liked Longshore's mental understanding of the game of football. Despite passing for only 85 yards in a lopsided loss to Tennessee and being replaced by Ayoob in the second half of the Tennessee game, Longshore remained the team's starter. He led the Bears to a 10–3 record, a share of the Pac-10 title for the first time since 1975, and a victory in the 2006 Holiday Bowl. He was named the co-offensive MVP of the Holiday Bowl alongside running back Marshawn Lynch

Longshore was particularly effective in his first full season as California's starting quarterback. He became the second quarterback in California school history to throw for 3,000 yards. He was second in the Pac-10 in passing touchdowns with 24 and second in passing efficiency at 141.6. He was an honorable mention Pac-10 honoree and earned various player of the week awards.

=== 2007 ===
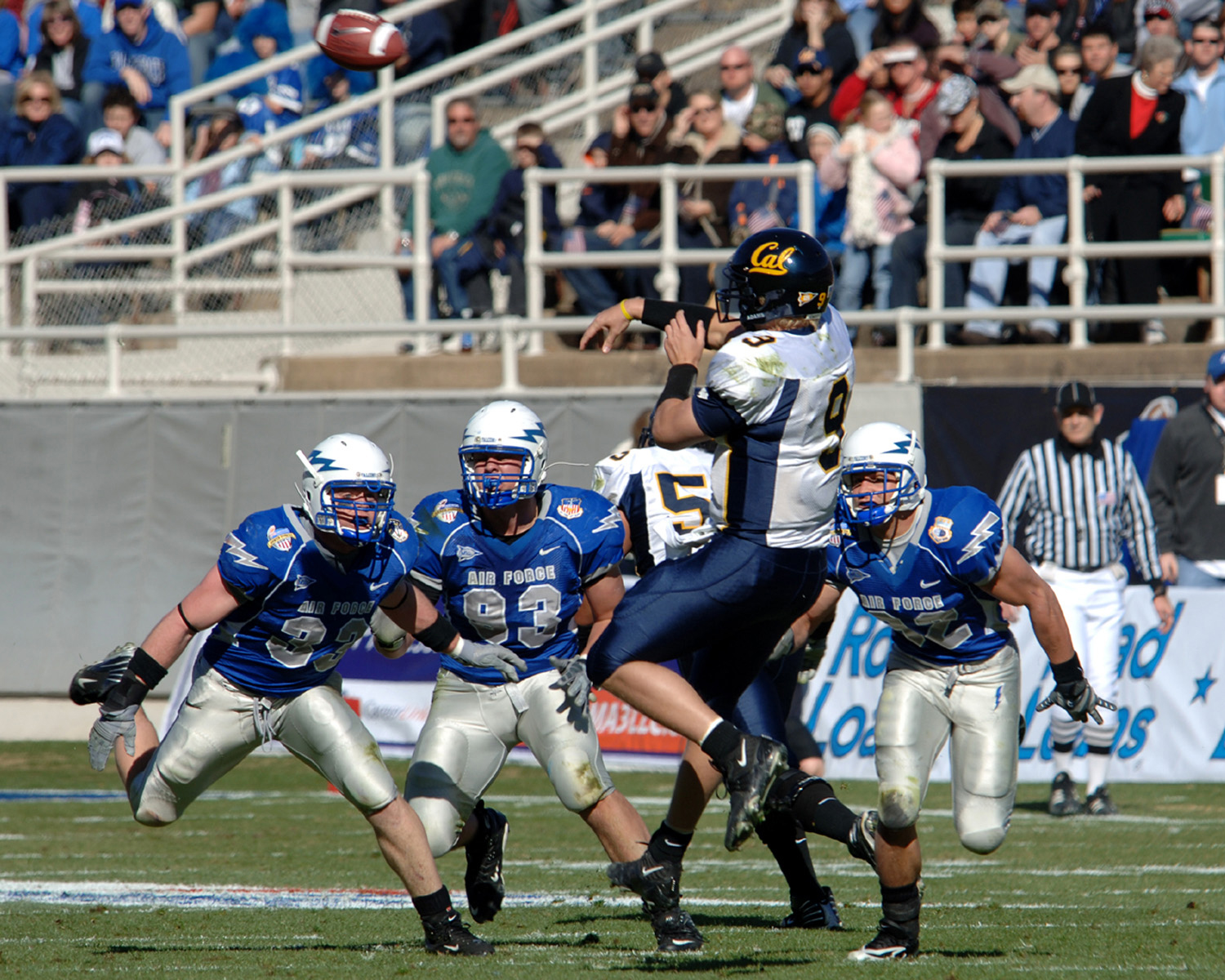
Longshore releases a pass under pressure at the Armed Forces Bowl.

Longshore entered 2007 as the established starting quarterback. In the preseason, Longshore was rated as the No. 5 quarterback in the nation by The Sporting News and ESPN's Mel Kiper Jr. ranked him the 3rd best junior quarterback in the country. Longshore led the Bears to 5-0 start and a number #2 ranking with wins against #15 Tennessee and #11 Oregon, but suffered a sprained right ankle that resulted in a bone spur in California's close victory over Oregon. Longshore missed the Oregon State game, Cal's first loss. He returned to start the Bears' last six regular season games, but he and the Bears were not the same, winning only one game, against Washington State.

Longshore faltered badly over the second half of the season, throwing 11 interceptions compared to 9 touchdowns over the team's final six regular season games. His struggles were particularly apparent in the fourth quarter of close games where he threw several interceptions in critical game situations that prevented California from making comebacks. Longshore started for Cal at the 2007 Armed Forces Bowl, but was replaced by backup Kevin Riley in the second quarter, who finished the game and was named the game MVP in Cal's 42-36 victory over Air Force.

The extent to which the ankle injury affected Longshore's performance is uncertain. Some media reports and telecasts have noted the injury on several occasions, some saying it was causing him to limp, while others have claimed that the impact was mental.

=== 2008 ===
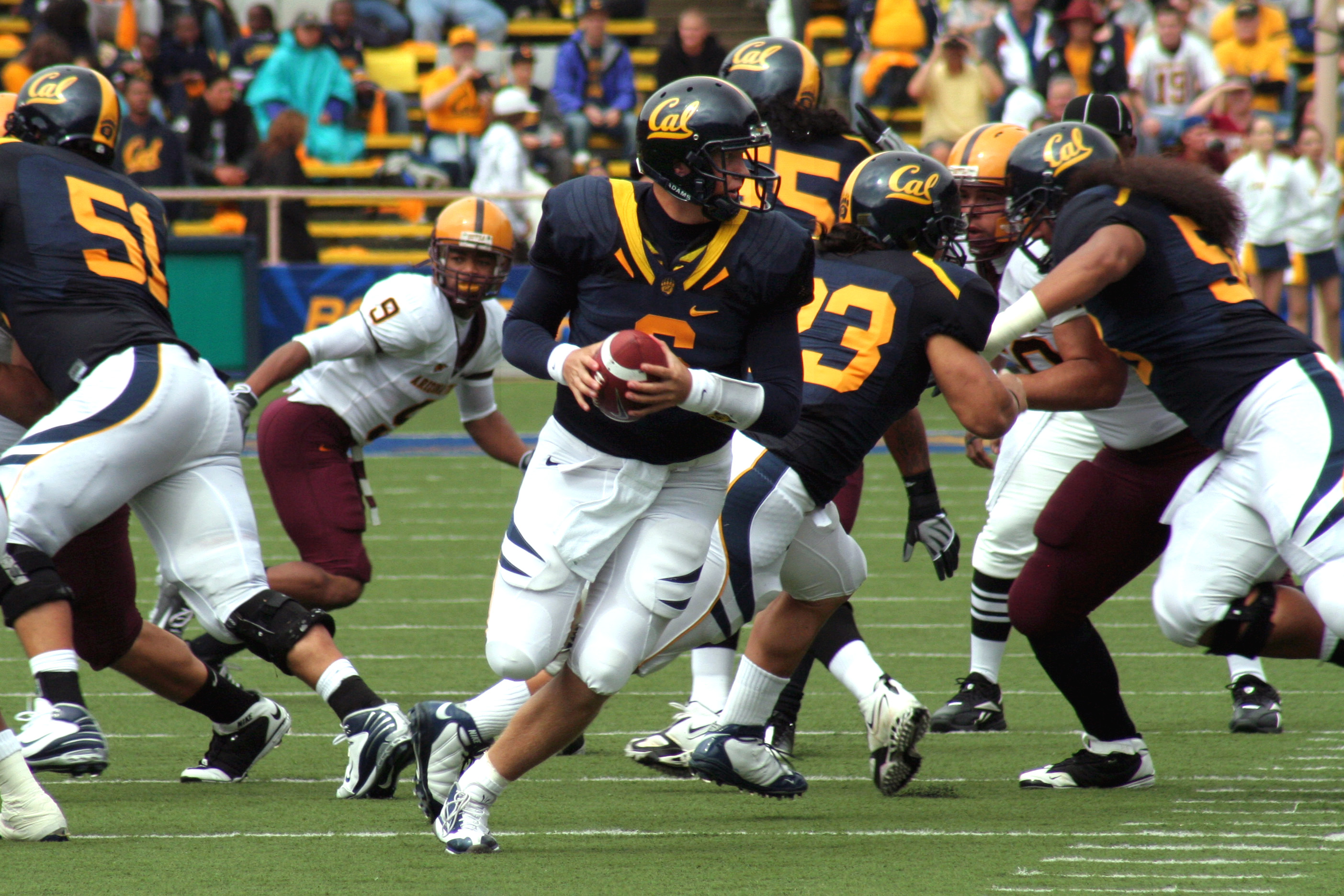
Longshore prepares to throw a pass against Arizona State on October 4.

After a difficult second year, Longshore was looking to 2008 as a fresh start. Coach Jeff Tedford hinted that Longshore and Kevin Riley, Longshore's primary competitor for the quarterback position, would play significant minutes leading into conference play.

On August 30, in Cal's season opener against the Michigan State Spartans, Tedford inserted Longshore for two drives. Both resulted in interceptions, one of which was returned by the Spartans for a touchdown. By comparison, Riley, who quarterbacked for the rest of the game, completed 202 passing yards with two touchdown passes. Tedford announced on September 2 that Riley would be the starter and that Longshore would be the backup. Longshore saw playing time the following week on September 6 in Cal's 66-3 rout of Washington State in Pullman, Washington. He led the Bears in the third quarter and into the fourth, and passed for 53 yards.

Longshore saw playing time three weeks later on September 27 against the Colorado State Rams, replacing a struggling Riley who had thrown for a touchdown and had one interception. Although Longshore's two touchdown passes in the fourth quarter came with the game's outcome beyond doubt in the Bears' 42-7 victory, Tedford reopened the quarterback competition for the following week against Arizona State on October 4. Longshore won the starting job and played the entire game, throwing for 198 yards, including three touchdowns and one interception in the 24-14 victory. The game marked his first start since the 2007 Armed Forces Bowl.

Longshore started the next Cal game, an away game at Arizona. He threw for 218 yards and two touchdowns, but also threw an interception that was returned for a touchdown early in the second half. He was replaced by Riley in the fourth quarter, who was unable to bring the Bears back from a 42-27 deficit. The starting quarterback spot reverted again to Riley the following week against UCLA, who played the entire game in the 41-20 victory.

Riley also started the following week on November 1 against Oregon, but sustained a concussion after being hit in the first quarter when he failed to slide while trying to gain a first down and did not return to the game. Longshore stepped in and led the Bears to a 26-16 upset over the #23 Ducks. Longshore started the following week against USC, during which he threw two interceptions that were negated by penalties against the Trojans defense, although he did lead the Bears on their only scoring drive. He was replaced by Riley in the second half, who was unable to lead the Bears to an upset of the #6 Trojans.

Longshore did not see playing time again until the final regular season game of his college career on December 6 against the winless Washington Huskies when he stepped in for Riley during the second and third quarters. He threw for 84 yards and his 50th career touchdown pass, which moved him up to fourth overall in touchdown passes. He was replaced in the fourth quarter by third-string quarterback Brock Mansion when Cal began playing its backup players to give them some game experience. Longshore's final collegiate game came when he was picked to start for the 2008 Emerald Bowl over Riley, his performances in practice and health being cited as factors. He passed for 121 yards and the game-winning touchdown to freshman tight end Anthony Miller, moving him up to third place alongside Troy Taylor for career touchdown passes.

=== College statistics ===
Year	Team	Games			Passing								Rushing			
Year	Team	GP	GS	Record	Cmp	Att	Pct	Yds	Avg	TD	Int	Rtg	Att	Yds	Avg	TD
2004	California	0	0	—	Redshirt											
2005	California	1	1	1−0	8	11	72.7	131	11.9	1	1	184.6	2	-22	-11.0	0
2006	California	13	13	10−3	227	377	60.2	3,021	8.0	24	13	141.6	28	-47	-1.7	3
2007	California	12	12	7−5	230	384	59.9	2,580	6.7	16	13	123.3	19	-44	-2.3	1
2008	California	9	4	2−2	93	164	56.7	1,051	6.4	10	4	125.8	8	-66	-8.3	0
Career		35	30	20−10	558	936	59.6	6,783	7.2	51	31	131.8	57	-179	-3.1	4

== Post-college career ==
Nate Longshore went undrafted in the 2009 NFL draft. In April 2009, Longshore was invited to try out for the Cincinnati Bengals, but he decided to go to the Miami Dolphins instead; he was given a three-day rookie mini-camp. After the mini-camp, Longshore was not offered a contract.

In 2010, he took a position as an assistant football coach at Santa Margarita Catholic High School.. From 2020–24, he served on the coaching staff of UNLV as offensive analyst (2020) and tight ends coach (2021–24).

== Professional career ==
Longshore signed with the San Jose SaberCats, of the Arena Football League, in February 2011 but did not make the team's final roster.

== Personal life ==
Longshore is a member of the Church of Jesus Christ of Latter-day Saints. His father Todd Longshore died on April 24, 2006, of a blood clot. Older brother Nick Longshore died November 20, 2013, from an ATV accident in Idaho Falls. He was a former offensive lineman for Brigham Young University, graduated in April 2007. His younger brother Ben Longshore was a senior quarterback at his alma mater, Canyon High School of Santa Clarita, California, and walked on to Utah State as a freshman in 2007.
