= Will Taʻufoʻou =

American football player (born 1986)

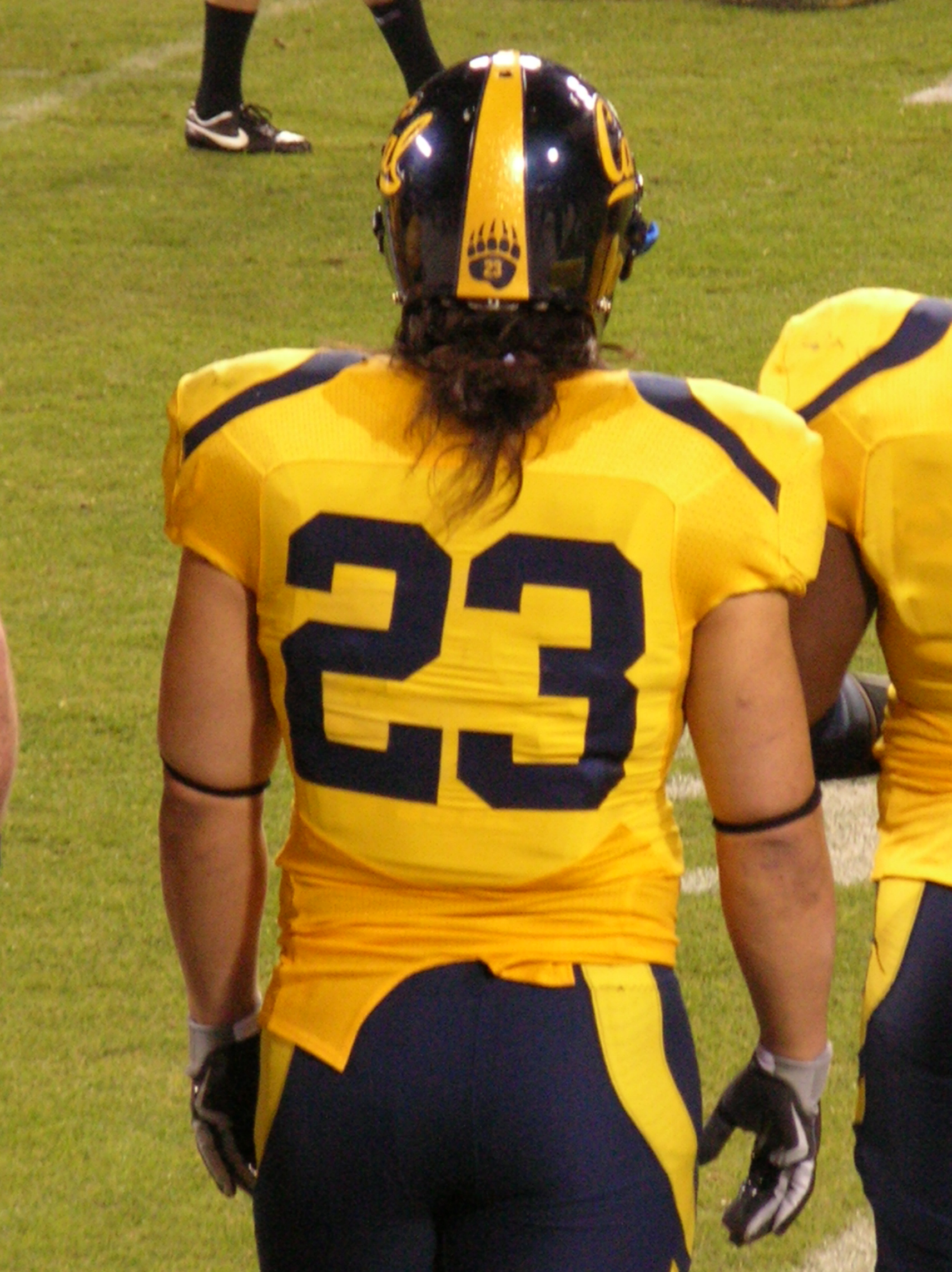
- Taʻufoʻou during his tenure at Cal at the 2008 Emerald Bowl

No. 45
- Position: Fullback

Personal information
- Born: June 19, 1986 (age 40); Redwood City, California, U.S.
- Listed height: 5 ft 11 in (1.80 m)
- Listed weight: 247 lb (112 kg)

Career information
- High school: Saint Francis(Mountain View, California)
- College: California
- NFL draft: 2009: undrafted

Career history
- Chicago Bears (2009–2011)*; Cleveland Browns (2011)*; Denver Broncos (2011)*; Tennessee Titans (2012)*; Jacksonville Jaguars (2012–2014)
- * Offseason or practice squad member only

Career NFL statistics
- Receptions: 18
- Receiving yards: 126

Will Taʻufoʻou (/taʊˈfoʊ.oʊ/; born June 19, 1986) is an American former professional football player who was a fullback in the National Football League (NFL). He played college football for the California Golden Bears and was signed by the Chicago Bears as an undrafted free agent in 2009.

== College career ==
Taʻufoʻou played at the University of California, Berkeley, for four years, during which running backs Marshawn Lynch (2005 and 2006), Justin Forsett (2007), and Jahvid Best (2008) each ran for more than 1,000 yards, with Best becoming the 2008 Pac-10 rushing leader.

== Professional career ==
=== Chicago Bears ===
Taʻufoʻou was signed by the Chicago Bears as a free agent on April 27, 2009. He was waived on September 4 and was placed on the team's practice squad on September 5, where he remained the entire season.

After his practice squad contract expired at season's end, Taʻufoʻou was re-signed to a future contract by the Bears on January 4, 2010. He re-signed with the Bears again on July 29, 2011. He was waived on September 6.

=== Cleveland Browns ===
The Cleveland Browns signed him to their practice squad on September 14, 2011. He was released from the practice squad on November 8.

=== Jacksonville Jaguars ===
The Jacksonville Jaguars signed Ta'ufo'ou on July 28, 2012. He was waived, signed to the practice squad, and promoted to the active roster multiple times in the 2012 season. He appeared in six games. He was signed to the active roster at the conclusion of the 2012 season.

In the 2013 preseason, Ta'ufo'ou assumed the starting fullback position after the departure of nine-year veteran Greg Jones.

He became a free agent after the 2014 season.
