= 2008 Arizona State Sun Devils football team =

American college football season

2008 Arizona State Sun Devils football
- Conference: Pacific-10 Conference
- Record: 5–7 (4–5 Pac-10)
- Head coach: Dennis Erickson (2nd season)
- Offensive coordinator: Rich Olson (2nd season)
- Offensive scheme: Spread
- Defensive coordinator: Craig Bray (2nd season)
- Base defense: 4–3
- Captains: Rudy Carpenter; Troy Nolan
- Home stadium: Sun Devil Stadium

Uniform

2008 Pacific-10 Conference football standings
	Conf.			Overall
Team	W		L	W		L
No. 3 USC $	8	–	1	12	–	1
No. 10 Oregon	7	–	2	10	–	3
No. 18 Oregon State	7	–	2	9	–	4
California	6	–	3	9	–	4
Arizona	5	–	4	8	–	5
Arizona State	4	–	5	5	–	7
Stanford	4	–	5	5	–	7
UCLA	3	–	6	4	–	8
Washington State	1	–	8	2	–	11
Washington	0	–	9	0	–	12
$ – Conference champion; Rankings from AP Poll

The 2008 Arizona State Sun Devils football team represented Arizona State University in the 2008 NCAA Division I FBS football season. They played their home games at Sun Devil Stadium in Tempe, Arizona.

After the loss to Arizona in the Territorial Cup Arizona State didn’t qualify for a bowl game for the first time since the 2003 season.

== Schedule ==
Date	Time	Opponent	Rank	Site	TV	Result	Attendance	Source
August 30	7:00 pm	Northern Arizona*	No. 15	Sun Devil Stadium; Tempe, AZ	FSNAZ	W 30–13	62,707	
September 6	7:00 pm	Stanford	No. 15	Sun Devil Stadium; Tempe, AZ	FSNAZ	W 41–17	59,441	
September 13	7:00 pm	UNLV*	No. 15	Sun Devil Stadium; Tempe, AZ	FSNAZ	L 20–23	59,852	
September 20	5:00 pm	No. 3 Georgia*		Sun Devil Stadium; Tempe, AZ	ABC	L 10–27	71,706	
October 4	12:30 pm	at California		California Memorial Stadium; Berkeley, CA	ABC	L 14–24	58,302	
October 11	12:30 pm	at No. 8 USC		Los Angeles Memorial Coliseum; Los Angeles, CA	ABC	L 0–28	84,956	
October 25	7:00 pm	Oregon		Sun Devil Stadium; Tempe, AZ		L 20–54	69,406	
November 1	7:15 pm	at Oregon State		Reser Stadium; Corvallis, OR	FSN	L 25–27	44,109	
November 8	5:00 pm	at Washington		Husky Stadium; Seattle, WA	FSNAZ	W 39–19	57,013	
November 15	3:30 pm	Washington State^{†}		Sun Devil Stadium; Tempe, AZ		W 31–0	61,490	
November 28	7:30 pm	UCLA		Sun Devil Stadium; Tempe, AZ	ESPN2	W 34–9	61,005	
December 6	6:00 pm	at Arizona		Arizona Stadium; Tucson, AZ (rivalry)	ESPN	L 10–31	58,704	
*Non-conference game; ^{†}Homecoming; Rankings from AP Poll released prior to the game; All times are in Mountain time

== Roster ==
Wide receiver

- 1 Michael Jones - (redshirt) Sr.
- 2 Brandon Smith - (redshirt) Jr.
- 4 Gerell Robinson - Fr.
- 5 Kerry Taylor - So.
- 6 Kyle Williams - Jr.
- 9 A.J. Pickens - Fr
- 13 Chris McGaha - (redshirt) Jr.
- 16 Nate Kimbrough - (redshirt) Sr.
- 17 Dustin Driscoll - (redshirt) So.
- 19 Kemonte Bateman - Fr.
- 23 Tony Simmons - So.
- 32 Allante Battle - Fr.
- 32o Bryant Piva - Jr.
- 81 Gerald Montgomery - Fr.
- 85 Brian Matsumoto - Jr.
- 86 T.J. Simpson - (redshirt) Fr.

Tight end

- 81 Wes Evans - (redshirt) Sr.
- 82 Lance Evbuomwan - (redshirt) So.
- 83 Stanley Malamala - Jr.
- 84 Jovon Williams - (redshirt) Jr.
- 87 Steven Figueroa Fr.
- 88 Andrew Pettes - (redshirt) Sr.
- 89 Dan Knapp - (redshirt) Fr.
- 96 Toa Tuitea - Fr.

Offensive line

- 51o Clay Davie - (redshirt) Fr.
- 52 Garth Gerhart - (redshirt) Fr.
- 56 Thomas Altieri - (redshirt) Jr.
- 59 Jon Hargis - (redshirt) So.
- 60 Chris Scott - (redshirt) Fr.
- 63 Paul Fanaika - (redshirt) Sr.
- 64 Isaiah Williams - So.
- 66 Matt Hustad - (redshirt) Fr.
- 67 Shawn Lauvao - (redshirt) Jr.
- 68 Trent Marsh (redshirt) Fr.
- 70 Mike Marcisz - (redshirt) Fr.
- 72 Andrew Sampson - Fr.
- 73 Zach Schlink - Fr.
- 74 Tom Njunge - Jr.
- 76 Patrick Jamison - Fr.
- 77 Adam Tello - (redshirt) Fr.
- 78 Kyle Johnson - Fr.
- 79 Brent Good- (redshirt) Jr.

Quarterback

- 7 Jack Elway - Fr.
- 8 Chasen Stangel - (redshirt) Fr.
- 10 Samson Szakacsy - (redshirt) Fr.
- 12 Rudy Carpenter - (redshirt) Sr.
- 15 Danny Sullivan - Jr.

Running back

- 20 Jarrell Woods - (redshirt) So.
- 21 Ryan Bass - Fr.
- 24 Keegan Herring - Sr.
- 29 Avory Battle - (redshirt) Fr.
- 30 Cole Ptacek - (redshirt) So.
- 31 Dimitri Nance - Jr.
- 36 Shaun DeWitty - (redshirt) Jr.

Defensive line

- 34 James Brooks - . (redshirt) Fr.
- 49 Luis Vasquez - (redshirt) Sr.
- 50 Lawrence Guy - Fr.
- 51 Otis Jones - Fr.
- 54 Paul Unga - Sr.
- 55 Jamarr Robinson - (redshirt) So.
- 58 Dexter Davis - (redshirt) Jr.
- 61 Bo Moos - (redshirt) Fr.
- 65 David Bertrand - (redshirt) Jr.
- 77 Saia Falahola - (redshirt) So.
- 90 David Smith - (redshirt) Sr.
- 91 Leo Montt - (redshirt) Jr.
- 92 Jamarr Jarrett - Fr.
- 93 Zeb Togiai - Fr.
- 94 Alex Asi - (redshirt) Sr.
- 95 Eric Tanner - (redshirt) Jr.
- 96 Toa Tuitea - Fr.
- 97 Michael Jewell - (redshirt) Fr.
- 98 Zach Brown - (redshirt) So.
- 99 Jonathan English - So.
- 45. Spencer Gasu. - "Jr."

Defensive back

- 1 Deveron Carr - Fr.
- 3 Omar Bolden - So.
- 5 Terrill Carr - Jr.
- 7 Joey Parkhurst - So.
- 8 Jarrell Holman - (redshirt) Jr.
- 13 Cameron Harkey - (redshirt) Jr.
- 14 Troy Nolan - (redshirt) Sr.
- 15 Angelo Fobbs-Valentino - (redshirt) Sr.
- 16 Kamron Brown - (redshirt) So.
- 17 Travis Smith - (redshirt) Jr.
- 19 Max Tabach - So.
- 20 Jonathan Clark - (redshirt) Fr.
- 22 Rodney Cox - (redshirt) Sr.
- 23 Josh Jordan - Fr.
- 26 Larry Kelly - Fr.
- 28 Taylor Ashton - (redshirt) Fr.
- 31 Pierre Singfield - Jr.
- 36 Corey Henderson - Sr.
- 37 Mike Callaghan - (redshirt) So.
- 38 Greg Cole - Jr.

Linebacker

- 2 Ryan McFoy - Jr.
- 4 Chad Lindsay - (redshirt) Jr.
- 18 Oliver Aaron - (redshirt) Fr.
- 21 Colin Parker - (redshirt) Fr.
- 25 Mike Nixon - Jr.
- 30 Derrall Anderson - (redshirt) Fr.
- 39 Ryan Skorupka - Jr.
- 41 Shelly Lyons - Fr.
- 43 Anthony Reyes - (redshirt) Sr.
- 44 Travis Goethel - Jr.
- 46 Jeff Bereuter - (redshirt) So.
- 47 Gerald Munns - Jr.
- 48 Brandon Magee - Fr.
- 52 Morris Wooten - (redshirt) Sr.
- 55 Tom DeMichele - Fr.

Long snapper

- 51 Mr. America Clay Davie - (redshirt) Fr.
- 57 Thomas Ohmart- Fr.

Kicker / Punter

- 28 Thomas Weber - (redshirt) So.
- 42 Zach Richards - (redshirt) Fr.
- 91 Kevin Ivkovich - (redshirt) So.

== Game summaries ==
=== Northern Arizona ===
	1	2	3	4	Total
Northern Arizona	0	0	3	10	13
ASU	10	17	3	0	30

=== Stanford ===
	1	2	3	4	Total
Stanford	7	3	7	0	17
ASU	3	17	7	14	41

=== UNLV ===
	1	2	3	4	OT	Total
UNLV	0	10	0	10	3	23
ASU	3	10	7	0	0	20

=== Georgia ===
	1	2	3	4	Total
Georgia	0	21	3	3	27
ASU	0	3	7	0	10

=== California ===
	1	2	3	4	Total
ASU	0	7	7	0	14
California	10	7	7	0	24

=== USC ===
	1	2	3	4	Total
ASU	0	0	0	0	0
USC	7	14	0	7	28

=== Oregon ===
	1	2	3	4	Total
Oregon	13	10	21	10	54
ASU	0	6	7	7	20

=== Oregon State ===
	1	2	3	4	Total
ASU	3	3	10	9	25
Oregon State	7	0	10	10	27

=== Washington ===
	1	2	3	4	Total
ASU	3	13	7	16	39
Washington	3	10	6	0	19

=== Washington State ===
	1	2	3	4	Total
Washington State	0	0	0	0	0
ASU	0	10	14	7	31

=== UCLA ===
	1	2	3	4	Total
UCLA	3	3	3	0	9
ASU	0	14	3	17	34

=== Arizona ===
Territorial Cup: Arizona State Sun Devils (5–5) at Arizona Wildcats (5–5)

Quarter	1	2	3	4	Total
Arizona St	0	10	0	0	10
Arizona	7	0	21	3	31

at Arizona Stadium • Tucson, Arizona

- Date: December 6
- Game time: 6:00 p.m.
- Game weather: Mostly clear • 65 °F (18 °C) • Wind 5 miles per hour (8.0 km/h; 4.3 kn) N
- Game attendance: 58,704
- Referee: Jack Wood
- TV: ESPN
- Box Score

Game information

Arizona St

- Rudy Carpenter
  13/31, 124 yds, TD, int
- Keegan Herring
  14 rush, 31 yds
- Kyle Williams
  3 rec, 40 yds

Arizona

- Willie Tuitama
  25/37, 284 yds, 2 TD, int
- Nic Grigsby
  22 rush, 114 yds, TD
- Mike Thomas
  9 rec, 75 yds

Scoring summary

Quarter	Time	Drive			Team	Scoring information	Score	
Quarter	Time	Plays	Yards	TOP	Team	Scoring information	ASU	ARIZ
1	0:31	12	98	5:44	Arizona	Rob Gronkowski 17-yard touchdown reception from Willie Tuitama, Jason Bondzio kick good	0	7
2	10:58	9	29	4:25	Arizona State	40-yard field goal by Thomas Weber	3	7
2	5:53	5	19	2:09	Arizona State	Andrew Pettes 2-yard touchdown reception from Rudy Carpenter, Thomas Weber kick good	10	7
3	7:23	11	70	5:52	Arizona	Delashaun Dean 10-yard touchdown reception from Willie Tuitama, Jason Bondzio kick good	10	14
3	4:24	4	34	1:29	Arizona	Nic Grigsby 12-yard touchdown run, Jason Bondzio kick good	10	21
3	2:22				Arizona	Punt returned 52 yards for touchdown by Mike Thomas, Jason Bondzio kick good	10	28
4	12:34	6	48	2:13	Arizona	49-yard field goal by Jason Bondzio	10	31
"TOP" = time of possession. For other American football terms, see Glossary of American football.							10	31

== Rankings ==
Ranking movements Legend: ██ Increase in ranking ██ Decrease in ranking — = Not ranked RV = Received votes
	Week															
Poll	Pre	1	2	3	4	5	6	7	8	9	10	11	12	13	14	Final
AP	15	15	15	RV	—	—	—	—	—	—	—	—	—	—	—	—
Coaches	16	14	13	24	—	—	—	—	—	—	—	—	—	—	—	—
Harris	Not released				—	—	—	—	—	—	—	—	—	—	—	Not released
BCS	Not released							—	—	—	—	—	—	—	—	Not released
