= Cameron Morrah =

American football player (born 1987)

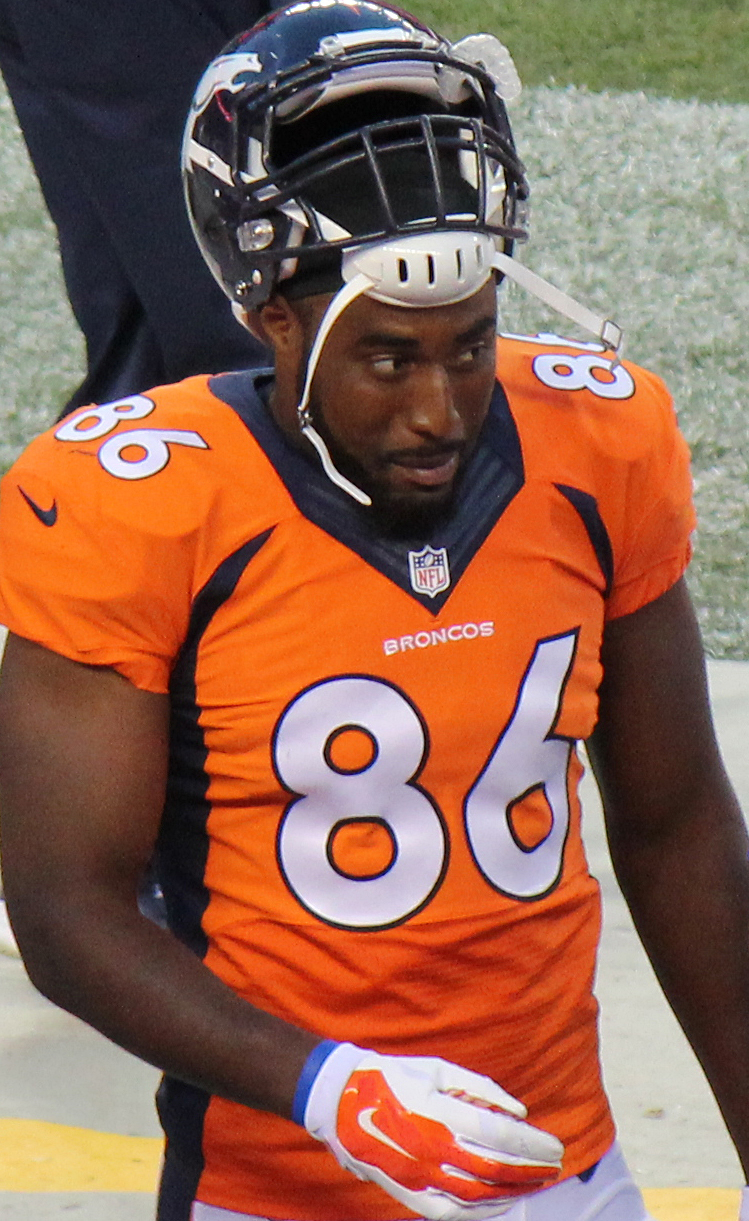
- Morrah with the Denver Broncos in 2014

No. 88, 86, 18
- Position: Tight end

Personal information
- Born: March 18, 1987 (age 39); Pomona, California, U.S.
- Listed height: 6 ft 3 in (1.91 m)
- Listed weight: 244 lb (111 kg)

Career information
- High school: Claremont (Claremont, California)
- College: California
- NFL draft: 2009: 7th round, 248th overall pick

Career history
- Seattle Seahawks (2009−2012); San Francisco 49ers (2013)*; Detroit Lions (2013)*; Denver Broncos (2014)*; BC Lions (2015)
- * Offseason or practice squad member only

Career NFL statistics
- Receptions: 16
- Receiving yards: 194
- Stats at Pro Football Reference

Cameron Morrah (born March 18, 1987) is an American former professional football player who was a tight end who played in the National Football League (NFL) and Canadian Football League (CFL). He played college football for the California Golden Bears and was selected by the Seattle Seahawks in the seventh round of the 2009 NFL draft.

== Early life ==
Morrah was a standout defensive end and tight end at Claremont High where he helped lead his team to three straight Baseline League championships, racking up honors as a three-time first-team All Baseline League Selection, three-time All CIF Southern Section Selection, team MVP, 13th ranked defensive end in the nation, rated 28th best player in the state of California, 60th best in the Far West Region, four stars by Rivals, and was a Parade All American, making him one of the top recruits for the Golden Bears 2005 recruiting class.

== College career ==
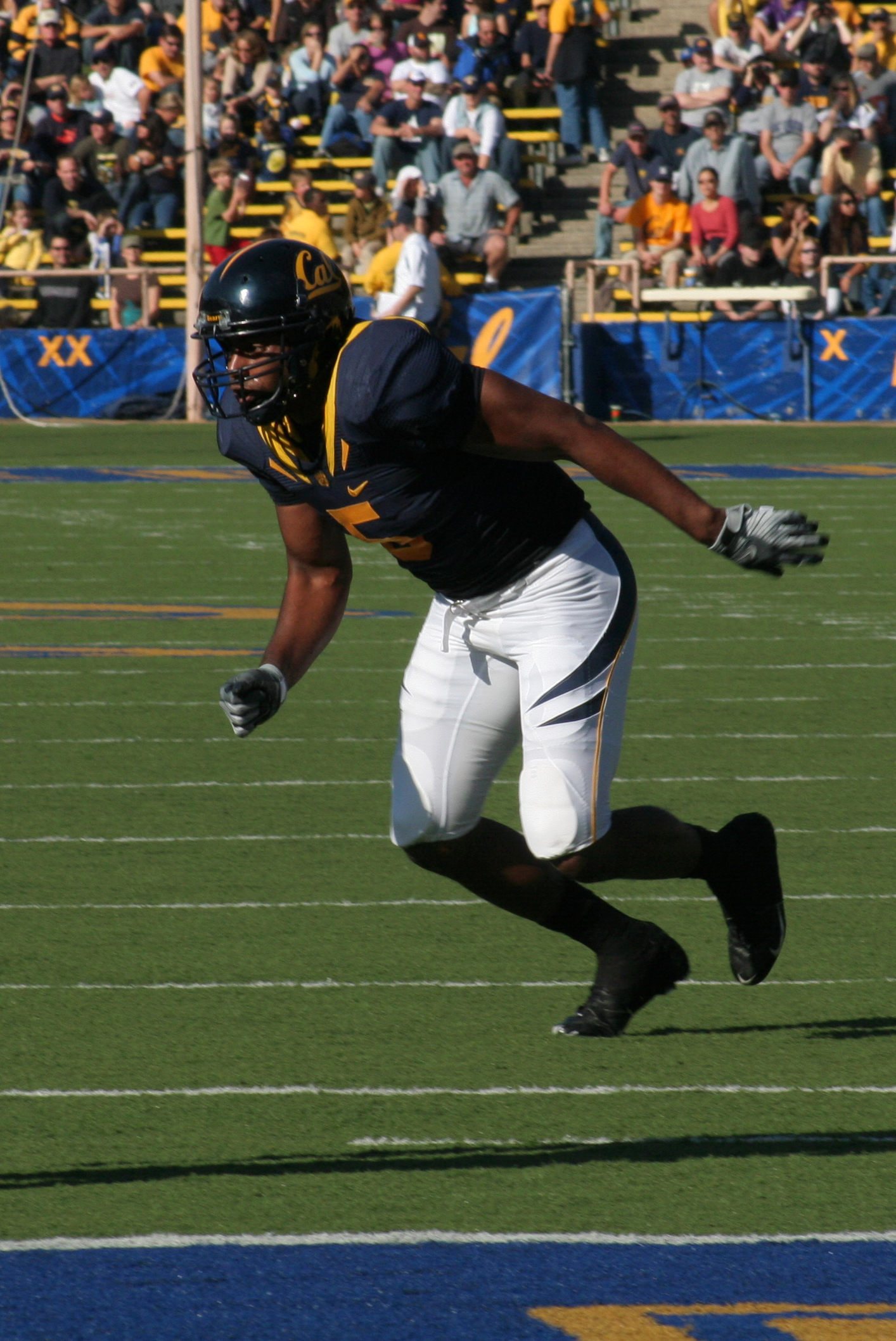
Morrah during his tenure at Cal in December 2008.

Morrah played college football at the University of California, Berkeley, where he led the Golden Bears in touchdown receptions in the 2008 season with 8. After receiving a touchdown pass from QB Nate Longshore on December 6, 2008 vs Washington, Morrah became the school's single season touchdown record holder for tight ends.

== Professional career ==
Pre-draft measurables
Height	Weight	Arm length	Hand span	40-yard dash	10-yard split	20-yard split	20-yard shuttle	Three-cone drill	Vertical jump	Broad jump	Bench press
6 ft 3 3/8 in (1.91 m)	244 lb (111 kg)	33 1/2 in (0.85 m)	9 1/2 in (0.24 m)	4.61 s	1.57 s	2.64 s	4.36 s	6.99 s	32.5 in (0.83 m)	9 ft 7 in (2.92 m)	24 reps
All values from NFL Combine/Pro Day

=== Seattle Seahawks ===
Selected by the Seattle Seahawks in 2009. He made his debut on opening day September 13, 2009 vs the St. Louis Rams and recorded his first reception 2 weeks later on September 27, 2009 vs the Chicago Bears. 2010 was Morrah's best year as a Seahawk he appeared in 15 games and became solid target late in the season. After being injured in the playoffs Morrah started his 2011 campaign on the teams P.U.P list while recovering from a foot surgery. That season, he played in 9 games with 3 starts. After being hampered by foot problems he was placed on the teams IR just before the 2012 season.

=== Denver Broncos ===
Morrah, along with seven other players, were signed to future contracts with the Denver Broncos on January 22, 2014.

=== BC Lions ===
On April 8, 2015 Morrah signed with BC Lions of the Canadian Football League. BC Lions head coach Jeff Tedford was Morrah's head coach while at Cal.
