= Rudy Carpenter =

American football player (born 1986)

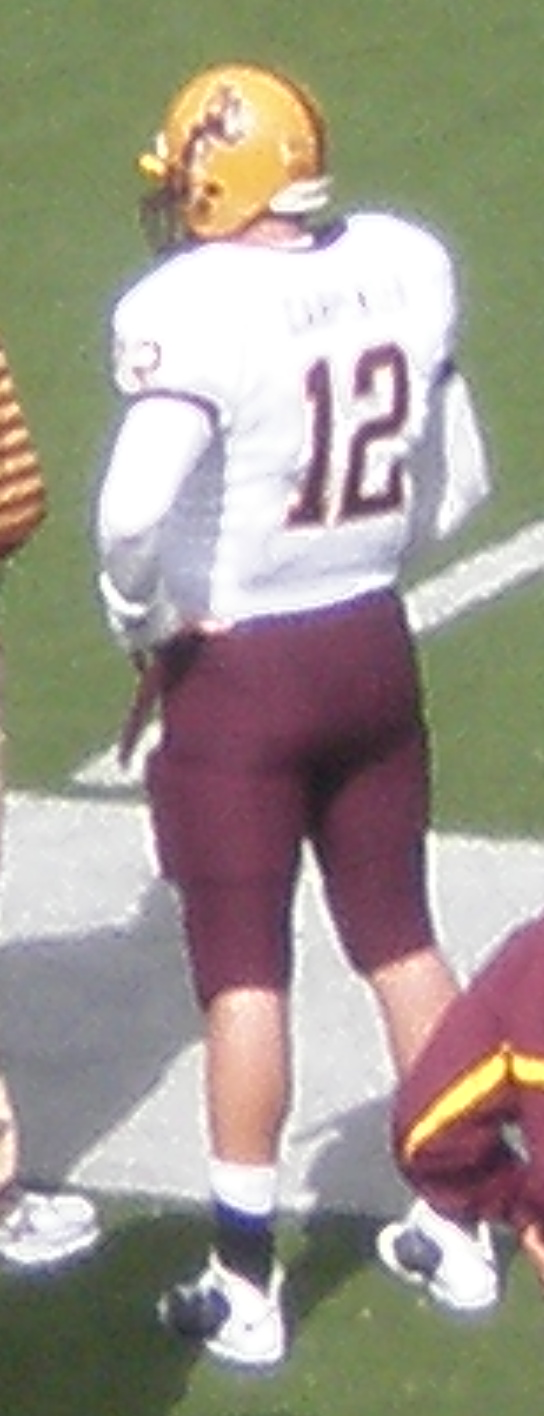
- Carpenter during his tenure at Arizona State in October 2008

No. 12
- Position: Quarterback

Personal information
- Born: April 15, 1986 (age 40); Westlake Village, California, U.S.
- Listed height: 6 ft 2 in (1.88 m)
- Listed weight: 220 lb (100 kg)

Career information
- High school: Westlake (Thousand Oaks, California)
- College: Arizona State
- NFL draft: 2009: undrafted

Career history
- Dallas Cowboys (2009)*; Tampa Bay Buccaneers (2009–2011); Dallas Cowboys (2012)*; BC Lions (2013)*
- * Offseason or practice squad member only
- Stats at Pro Football Reference
- Stats at CFL.ca (archive)

Rudy Carpenter (born April 15, 1986) is an American former professional football player who was a quarterback for the Tampa Bay Buccaneers of the National Football League (NFL). He was signed by the Dallas Cowboys as an undrafted free agent in 2009. He played college football for the Arizona State Sun Devils.

== Early life ==
Carpenter led Westlake High School to a 14–0 record and the 2003 California Interscholastic Federation Division II championship. Carpenter was named the Los Angeles Daily News Offensive Player of the Year. He was also given a pre and postseason All-America selection by Prepstar Magazine. Carpenter was listed as the No. 67 player in California by SuperPrep Magazine and listed as the No. 36 player in California and a preseason All-American by SuperPrep Magazine. He was rated as the No. 20 quarterback in the nation by Rivals.com. He played in the Cali-Florida High School All-Star game. His statistics as a senior included 2,705 passing yards (163 completions on 262 attempts) and 36 touchdowns and only six interceptions, and he also rushed for 626 yards and seven scores and led Westlake to a Division IV Championship and a 14-0 season.

== College career ==
=== 2005 ===
Carpenter started the final five games of his freshman season at Arizona State University. During that time he was the most efficient quarterback in the country and led the Sun Devils to a victory over Rutgers in the Insight Bowl. The following fall, Sam Keller, whose injury allowed Carpenter to become the starter in 2005, was named the starting quarterback by then-ASU coach Dirk Koetter. But two days later, Koetter reversed his decision and Carpenter was given the starting job. Keller subsequently transferred to Nebraska and Carpenter went on to have a less than desired season. Carpenter was named the MVP of the 2005 Insight Bowl. He earned second-team Freshman All-America honors by Scout.com and was named an honorable mention Freshman All-American by Sporting News.

=== 2006 ===
Carpenter earned honorable mention All-Pac-10 honors in his first full season as the Sun Devils starting quarterback. Carpenter completed 184-of-332 passes for 2,523 yards and 23 touchdowns and finished third in the Pac-10 Conference in touchdown passes as well as grossing 296 rushing yards (69 net yards). Carpenter completed 17-of-24 passes for 261 yards and two touchdowns against Northern Arizona and threw a career-high five touchdowns against Nevada to go along with 333 yards on 17-of-26 passing. He totaled 248 passing yards and a pair of touchdowns on 21-of-37 passes at Colorado and threw for 177 yards and two scores at California. Carpenter attempted 75 passes over the course of five midseason games without an interception. He ended the season tallying 183 yards of total offense at USC, including a career-high 49 net rushing yards, one of which was a game-high sprint of 38 yards. Carpenter completed 14-of-15 passes against Stanford (93.3 pct.).

=== 2007 ===
In 2007, Carpenter led the Sun Devils in the passer completion rating, compiling a 68.4% completion average. Carpenter started in all 13 games, and made a bowl appearance in the 2007 Holiday Bowl against Texas.

=== 2008 ===
Carpenter entered the season with 31 consecutive starts, the most out of any ASU Quarterback since Jake Plummer. Against the California Golden Bears on October 4, Carpenter finished with 165 yards passing, including one touchdown pass and two interceptions. He injured his ankle in the final minutes and had to leave the game on crutches. The loss marked the Sun Devils' first three-game losing streak since Dennis Erickson's tenure as head coach. ASU lost their final game to Arizona in the Territorial Cup rivalry, giving Carpenter a loss in his final game and ending a three-year streak of Territorial Cup victories by ASU.

== Professional career ==
=== Dallas Cowboys ===
Carpenter was signed as an undrafted free agent by the Dallas Cowboys a day after the 2009 NFL draft. He was waived on September 5, 2009, and subsequently re-signed to the practice squad the following day.

=== Tampa Bay Buccaneers ===
Carpenter was signed off the Cowboys practice squad by the Tampa Bay Buccaneers on November 23, 2009. In November 2010, Carpenter was moved to the active roster of Tampa Bay as the third-string quarterback. Following the completion of the 2010 season, he became an exclusive rights free agent. Carpenter re-signed with the Buccaneers on July 29. He was waived during final cuts on September 3, 2011, and re-signed to the Buccaneers' practice squad two days later. With an injury to Bucs starter Josh Freeman, Carpenter was placed on the active roster for the December 4 game against the Carolina Panthers. He made his first NFL game appearance in the game for one snap after Freeman's replacement Josh Johnson was shaken up on a play.

=== Dallas Cowboys ===
Carpenter was claimed off of waivers by the Dallas Cowboys April 5, 2012. On August 20, 2012, Carpenter tweeted via his Twitter account @rudygcarp12: "Thankful for the opportunity Dallas its been great!," signifying he was being cut again.

Carpenter was reported as flying to Kansas City to work out with the Kansas City Chiefs January 20, 2013. Carpenter tweeted: "Flying to Kansas City on Thursday for a workout! Just happy and thankful to maybe gettin back in!"

=== BC Lions ===
Carpenter signed with the BC Lions of the CFL on April 9, 2013. He would be competing for the backup role in the organization with two-year starter Travis Lulay having a solid hold as the starting quarterback. However, he was later released on April 30, 2013, following the club's signing of Chris Hart.

== See also ==
- List of NCAA major college football yearly passing leaders
