= 2008 Emerald Bowl =

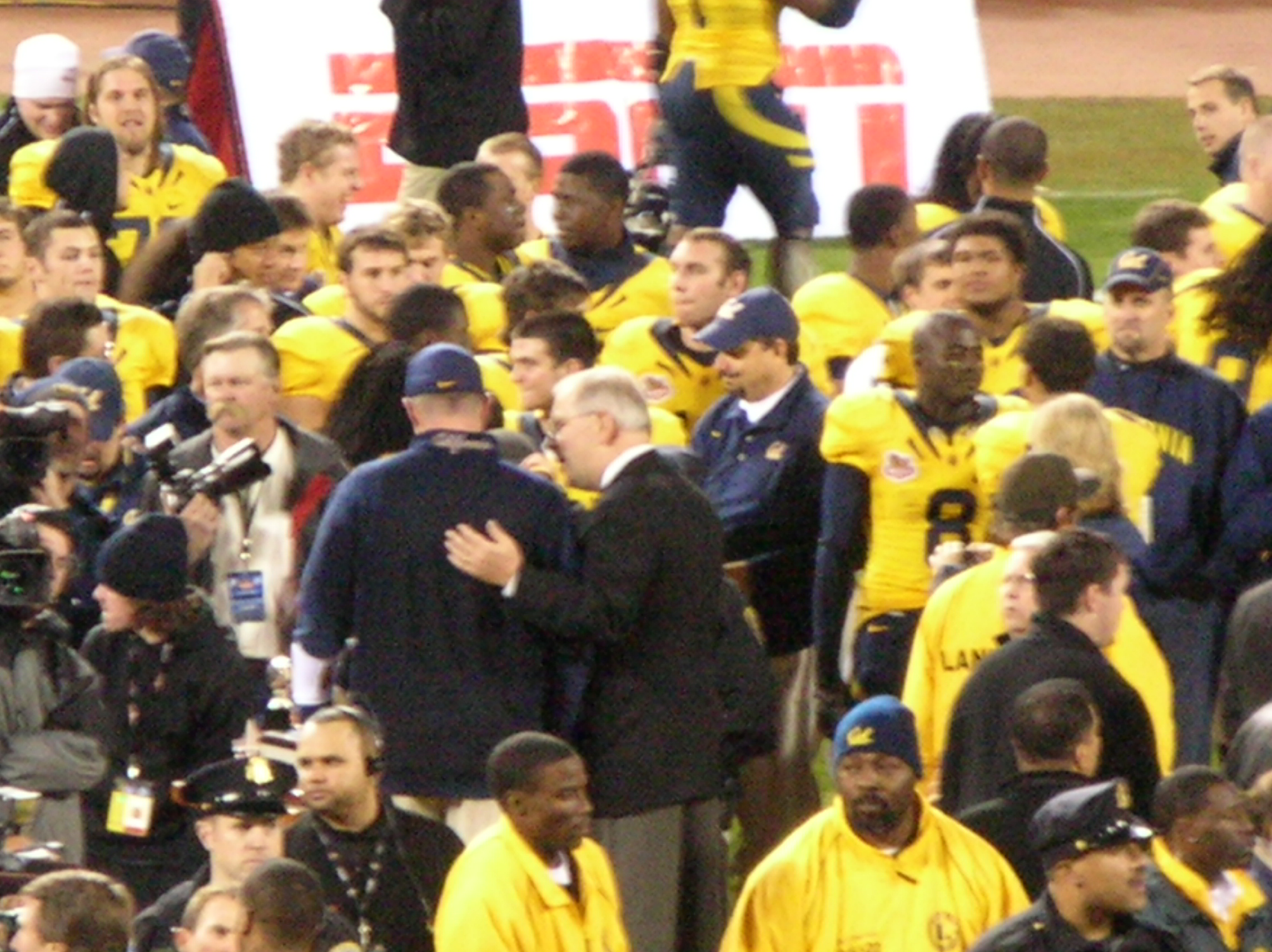
- Cal head coach Jeff Tedford accepts the 2008 Emerald Bowl trophy
Miami Hurricanes	California Golden Bears
(7–5)	(8–4)
ACC	Pac-10
17	24
Head coach: Randy Shannon	Head coach: Jeff Tedford
	1	2	3	4	Total
Miami	0	7	7	3	17
California	14	0	3	7	24
- Date: December 27, 2008
- Season: 2008
- Stadium: AT&T Park
- Location: San Francisco, California
- MVP: RB Jahvid Best, California (Offensive); LB Zack Follett, California (Defensive)
- Favorite: Cal by 8
- Referee: Nick Define (MAC)
- Halftime show: Band of the Hour; University of California Marching Band
- Attendance: 42,268
- Payout: US$850,000 (Pac-10) • $750,000 (ACC)

United States TV coverage
- Network: ESPN
- Announcers: Joe Tessitore play-by-play Rod Gilmore color Quint Kessenich sideline
- Nielsen ratings: 4.6

The 2008 Emerald Bowl, part of the 2008–09 NCAA football bowl games season, was played on December 27, 2008, at AT&T Park, the home field of the Giants in San Francisco, California. The Miami Hurricanes of the ACC were matched against the California Golden Bears of the Pac-10, the first appearance by either team in the seven-year history of the Emerald Bowl.

With a 24–17 victory over Miami, Cal improved its record to 10–8–1 all-time in bowl games, and 2–2 all-time vs. Miami. Miami fell to 18–14 all-time in bowl games. California and Miami had met three times previously, with Miami holding a 2–1 advantage. The first meeting resulted in a 9–7 win by Cal in Miami on October 10, 1964. Miami won the next two meetings, 31–3 on September 16, 1989, in Miami, and 52–24 on September 15, 1990, in Berkeley.

== Records ==
A number of Emerald Bowl records were set in this game:

- Attendance: 42,268
- Longest Pass Play: 74 yards; Nate Longshore to Verran Tucker (California)
- Most Yards Rushing: 186 yards, Jahvid Best (California)
- Longest Rush: 42 yards, Jahvid Best (California)
- Quarterback Sacks By: 2, Zack Follett (California)
- Most Total Plays: 124, Miami (73) vs. California (51)

== Scoring summary ==
Scoring Play	Score
1st Quarter
Cal - Jahvid Best 1-yard TD run (Giorgio Tavecchio kick), 7:15	Cal 7-0
Cal - Best 42-yard TD run (Tavecchio kick), 4:55	Cal 14-0
2nd Quarter
Miami - LaRon Byrd 9-yard TD pass from Jacory Harris (Matt Bosher kick), 12:54	Cal 14-7
3rd Quarter
Miami - Thearon Collier 6-yard TD pass from Harris (Bosher kick), 7:34	Tie 14-14
Cal - Tavecchio 23-yard FG, :27	Cal 17-14
4th Quarter
Miami - Bosher 22-yard FG, 9:13	Tie 17-17
Cal - Anthony Miller 2-yard TD pass from Nate Longshore (Tavecchio kick), 2:41	Cal 24-17
