= 2008 Washington State Cougars football team =

American college football season

2008 Washington State Cougars football
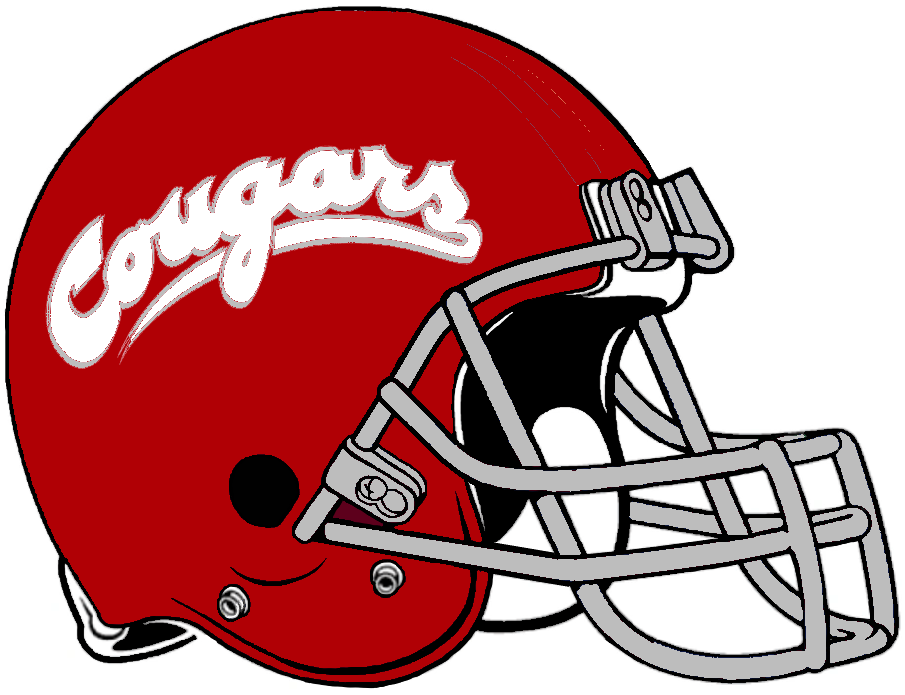
- Conference: Pacific-10 Conference
- Record: 2–11 (1–8 Pac-10)
- Head coach: Paul Wulff (1st season)
- Offensive coordinator: Todd Sturdy (1st season)
- Offensive scheme: Spread
- Co-defensive coordinators: Chris Ball (1st season); Jody Sears (1st season)
- Base defense: Multiple
- Home stadium: Martin Stadium (Capacity: 35,117)

2008 Pacific-10 Conference football standings
	Conf.			Overall
Team	W		L	W		L
No. 3 USC $	8	–	1	12	–	1
No. 10 Oregon	7	–	2	10	–	3
No. 18 Oregon State	7	–	2	9	–	4
California	6	–	3	9	–	4
Arizona	5	–	4	8	–	5
Arizona State	4	–	5	5	–	7
Stanford	4	–	5	5	–	7
UCLA	3	–	6	4	–	8
Washington State	1	–	8	2	–	11
Washington	0	–	9	0	–	12
$ – Conference champion; Rankings from AP Poll

The 2008 Washington State Cougars football team represented Washington State University in the 2008 NCAA Division I FBS football season. The team's new head coach was Paul Wulff and home games were played on campus at Martin Stadium in Pullman, Washington. The season was a disaster from the start for WSU, who gave up the most points in a single season in Pac-10 Conference history, allowing more than 60 points on four occasions.

Perhaps the only consolation for the Cougars was winning the Apple Cup. The media joked before the game that it was the "Crapple Cup" and "full of worms", because the Huskies (0–10 at the time) also had a very poor season.

== Schedule ==
Date	Time	Opponent	Site	TV	Result	Attendance	Source
August 30	12:30 p.m.	Oklahoma State*	Qwest Field; Seattle, WA (2008 Cougar Gridiron Classic)	FSN	L 13–39	50,830	
September 6	3:30 p.m.	California	Martin Stadium; Pullman, WA	FSNNW	L 3–66	27,906	
September 12	5:30 p.m.	at Baylor*	Floyd Casey Stadium; Waco, TX	FSN	L 17–45	25,595	
September 20	4:00 p.m.	Portland State*	Martin Stadium; Pullman, WA	FSNNW	W 48–9	23,920	
September 27	3:15 p.m.	Oregon^{†}	Martin Stadium; Pullman, WA	FSNNW	L 14–63	30,927	
October 4	7:15 p.m.	at UCLA	Rose Bowl; Pasadena, CA	FSNNW	L 3–28	65,469	
October 11	3:30 p.m.	at Oregon State	Reser Stadium; Corvallis, OR	FSNNW	L 13–66	45,289	
October 18	12:30 p.m.	No. 6 USC	Martin Stadium; Pullman, WA	FSN	L 0–69	25,118	
November 1	2:00 p.m.	at Stanford	Stanford Stadium; Stanford, CA		L 0–58	26,662	
November 8	2:00 p.m.	Arizona	Martin Stadium; Pullman, WA		L 28–59	24,118	
November 15	2:30 p.m.	at Arizona State	Sun Devil Stadium; Tempe, AZ		L 0–31	61,490	
November 22	12:00 p.m.	Washington	Martin Stadium; Pullman, WA (Apple Cup)	FSN	W 16–13 ^{2OT}	32,211	
November 29	8:00 p.m.	at Hawaii*	Aloha Stadium; Halawa, HI		L 10–24	43,312	
*Non-conference game; ^{†}Homecoming; Rankings from AP Poll released prior to the game; All times are in Pacific time

== Game summaries ==
=== Oklahoma State ===
	1	2	3	4	Total
Cowboys	3	12	10	14	39
Cougars	0	0	6	7	13

Oklahoma State Cowboys spoiled new Cougars coach Paul Wulff's debut. Cowboys' Kendall Hunter had a career-best two touchdowns, quarterback Zac Robinson passed for 182 yards and ran for another score. The Cougars' new offense didn't look good against the Cowboys.

The Cowboys had 367 total yards (193 yards passing, 174 rushing) while Washington State had 196 total yards (82 passing and 114 yards rushing)

=== California ===
	1	2	3	4	Total
Golden Bears	21	21	10	14	66
Cougars	3	0	0	0	3

The Cougars were shut out after the first period while the Golden Bears scored at least 10 points each quarter to win the Pac-10 conference opener at Martin Stadium, Washington State's home field. Cal had over 500 yards (112 yards passing and 392 yards on the ground) and allowed only 162 yards (106 yards passing, 56 yards rushing) to the Cougars.

=== Baylor ===
	1	2	3	4	Total
Cougars	7	7	0	3	17
Bears	14	14	7	10	45

=== Portland State ===
	1	2	3	4	Total
Vikings	3	0	6	0	9
Cougars	14	3	24	7	48

=== Oregon ===
	1	2	3	4	Total
Ducks	21	14	21	7	63
Cougars	0	7	0	7	14

=== UCLA ===
	1	2	3	4	Total
Cougars	0	0	3	0	3
Bruins	0	14	7	7	28

=== Oregon State ===
	1	2	3	4	Total
Cougars	0	13	0	0	13
Beavers	21	3	21	21	66

=== USC ===
	1	2	3	4	Total
Trojans	21	20	7	21	69
Cougars	0	0	0	0	0

Mark Sanchez became the first USC quarterback to throw five touchdown passes in a half as the Trojans dominated.

USC's defense, ranked first in the nation coming in by allowing just 9.4 points per game, held the Cougars scoreless for the first time since 1984, ending a stretch of 280 straight games in which the Cougars had not been shut out. That was the nation's second-longest active streak behind Michigan's 306. For Washington State, it is also the largest shutout loss and largest margin of defeat in school history.

"Our guys had a ball playing football today, from the locker room on out", USC coach Pete Carroll said. "Right from the start, we wanted to find that focus that we really hadn't had yet."

It was the largest shutout victory for USC (5–1, 3–1 Pac-10) since a 69–0 win over Montana in 1931.

"Our intention wasn't to come out and beat these guys by 80 points. Our intention was to come out and play a great football game", star linebacker Rey Maualuga said.

The Cougars have now allowed at least 60 points in four games this year, becoming the first BCS team to allow 60-plus points four times in a season. Beset by injuries, Washington State has allowed 66, 63, 66 and now 69 in four of their conference losses. The Cougars, whose only win is against Portland State of the Championship Subdivision, have been outscored 385–111 this season. That's on track to break the Pac-10 record for most points allowed in a season, 469 by Oregon State in 1981.

"It's unfortunate for those guys. They are trying to build a program", Carroll said. "It's tough. I don't know what else we could have done.

"It was a little bit uncomfortable to see what was going to happen."

The Trojans outgained Washington State 408–17 in the first half and 625–116 for the game. They led 21–0 less than 11 minutes in. Patrick Turner and Ronald Johnson each caught two of Sanchez's scoring throws, freshman Broderick Green rushed for 121 yards and two touchdowns and C. J. Gable ran for 109 yards and three more scores. Stafon Johnson must have had an off game. He ran for 112 yards but didn't score.

It was the first time USC had three 100-yard rushers in a game since 1977.

=== Stanford ===
	1	2	3	4	Total
Cougars	0	0	0	0	0
Cardinal	10	21	20	7	58

=== Arizona ===
	1	2	3	4	Total
Wildcats	14	21	10	14	59
Cougars	7	7	7	7	28

=== Arizona State ===
	1	2	3	4	Total
Cougars	0	0	0	0	0
Sun Devils	0	10	14	7	31

=== Washington ===
Quarter	1	2	3	4	OT	2OT	Total
Washington	0	10	0	0	3	0	13
Washington State	0	0	7	3	3	3	16

at Martin Stadium, Pullman, Washington

- Date: November 22
- Game time: 3:00 p.m. EDT/12:10 p.m. PDT
- Game weather: 42 °F (6 °C)
- Game attendance: 32,211
- Referee: Michael Batlan
- Recap

Scoring summary

Quarter	Time	Drive			Team	Scoring information	Score	
Quarter	Time	Plays	Yards	TOP	Team	Scoring information	Washington	Washington State
2	12:17		60	4:08	Washington	Willie Griffin 3-yard touchdown run, Ryan Perkins kick good	7	0
2	5:07		18	2:35	Washington	35-yard field goal by Ryan Perkins	10	0
3	2:56		86	3:45	Washington State	Logwone Mitz 57-yard touchdown run, Nico Grasu kick good	10	7
4	:00		69	:56	Washington State	28-yard field goal by Nico Grasu	10	10
OT			23		Washington State	19-yard field goal by Nico Grasu	10	13
OT			20		Washington	22-yard field goal by Ryan Perkins	13	13
2OT			5		Washington State	37-yard field goal by Nico Grasu	13	16
"TOP" = time of possession. For other American football terms, see Glossary of American football.							13	16

=== Hawaii ===
	1	2	3	4	Total
Cougars	0	3	7	0	10
Warriors	14	3	7	0	24
