= 2009 California Golden Bears football team =

American college football season

2009 California Golden Bears football

Poinsettia Bowl, L 27–37 vs. Utah
- Conference: Pacific-10 Conference
- Record: 8–5 (5–4 Pac-10)
- Head coach: Jeff Tedford (8th season)
- Offensive coordinator: Andy Ludwig (1st season)
- Offensive scheme: Pro-style
- Defensive coordinator: Bob Gregory (8th season)
- Base defense: 4–3
- MVP: 3: Jahvid Best; Mike Mohamed; Shane Vereen
- Home stadium: Memorial Stadium

2009 Pacific-10 Conference football standings
	Conf.			Overall
Team	W		L	W		L
No. 11 Oregon $	8	–	1	10	–	3
Arizona	6	–	3	8	–	5
Oregon State	6	–	3	8	–	5
Stanford	6	–	3	8	–	5
No. 22 USC	5	–	4	9	–	4
California	5	–	4	8	–	5
Washington	4	–	5	5	–	7
UCLA	3	–	6	7	–	6
Arizona State	2	–	7	4	–	8
Washington State	0	–	9	1	–	11
$ – BCS representative as conference champion; Rankings from AP Poll

The 2009 California Golden Bears football team represented the University of California, Berkeley in NCAA Division I Football Bowl Subdivision (FBS) competition during the 2009 season. The Golden Bears were led by eighth-year head coach Jeff Tedford.

California hosted and beat Maryland to begin the season on September 5, 2009. It continued with victories over Eastern Washington, and at Minnesota. However, the team struggled with consistency, losing at Oregon and USC, then rebounding by winning at UCLA, Washington State, and then at Arizona State. Following a loss to Oregon State, Cal managed to upset Pac-10 title contender Arizona. Cal also pulled of an away game upset at Stanford in the Big Game. It ended the season with a loss at Washington on December 5. The Bears matched their 2008 regular season record of 8–4, finishing tied for fifth in the conference with the former reigning conference champion, USC. The Bears did not produce a 1,000-yard rusher for the first time since 2002, Tedford's first season. They accepted a bid to the 2009 Poinsettia Bowl, where they lost to Utah on December 23, snapping a four bowl game winning streak going back to 2004. The team was ranked as high as no. 6, but spent almost half the season unranked. The end of the season saw some coaching changes. Cal hired Jeff Genyk as special teams coach to replace the fired Pete Alamar, and Clancy Pendergast as defensive coordinator to replace Bob Gregory, who departed for Boise State.

== Preseason ==
Several key players departed after 2008, including Alex Mack, Nate Longshore, Zack Follett, Will Ta'ufo'ou and Cameron Morrah offensively, and Zack Follett, Rulon Davis, and Anthony Felder defensively. The Bears also lost offensive coordinator Frank Cignetti to Pittsburgh, but gained Andy Ludwig, who helped guide the Utah Utes to a perfect 13–0 season as offensive coordinator. Ludwig had previously worked alongside Cal head coach Jeff Tedford at Oregon and Fresno State, becoming the fifth offensive coordinator at Cal in five years.

Running back Jahvid Best underwent surgery to tighten a ligament that had been injured when he dislocated his left elbow against Colorado State on September 27, 2008. This was followed up by foot surgery on January 23 to relieve the irritation of an extra bone that was caused when Best bruised his foot halfway through the 2008 season. He missed spring football practice as a result. In early June Best was able to participate in team summer workouts without pain.

A week before the season opener against Maryland, junior Kevin Riley was named the starter for the 2009 season, a contrast to 2008 when head coach Jeff Tedford alternated between him and Nate Longshore. Riley's experience and comfort level with the offense were cited as factors in him winning the starting job over sophomore Brock Mansion and freshman Beau Sweeney.

The Bears were picked to finish second in the Pac-10 behind reigning conference champion USC in the annual preseason poll of media members who regularly cover the Pac-10. This marked the fifth time in the last six Pac-10 preseason polls that Cal was picked to be the conference's runner-up.

== Schedule ==
Date	Time	Opponent	Rank	Site	TV	Result	Attendance
September 5	7:00 p.m.	Maryland*	No. 12	Memorial Stadium; Berkeley, CA	ESPN2	W 52–13	62,367
September 12	2:30 p.m.	Eastern Washington*	No. 10	Memorial Stadium; Berkeley, CA	CSNCA	W 59–7	58,083
September 19	9:00 a.m.	at Minnesota*	No. 8	TCF Bank Stadium; Minneapolis, MN	ESPN	W 35–21	50,805
September 26	12:30 p.m.	at Oregon	No. 6	Autzen Stadium; Eugene, OR	ABC/ESPN	L 3–42	58,975
October 3	5:00 p.m.	No. 7 USC^{†}	No. 24	Memorial Stadium; Berkeley, CA	ABC	L 3–30	71,799
October 17	12:30 p.m.	at UCLA		Rose Bowl; Pasadena, CA (rivalry)	ABC	W 45–26	67,317
October 24	1:30 p.m.	Washington State		Memorial Stadium; Berkeley, CA		W 49–17	54,738
October 31	12:30 p.m.	at Arizona State		Sun Devil Stadium; Tempe, AZ	ABC	W 23–21	43,659
November 7	4:00 p.m.	Oregon State	No. 23	Memorial Stadium; Berkeley, CA	FSN	L 14–31	56,496
November 14	4:00 p.m.	No. 18 Arizona		Memorial Stadium; Berkeley, CA	Versus	W 24–16	53,347
November 21	4:30 p.m.	at No. 14 Stanford		Stanford Stadium; Stanford, CA (The Big Game)	Versus	W 34–28	50,510
December 5	3:30 p.m.	at Washington	No. 19	Husky Stadium; Seattle, WA	CSNCA	L 10–42	62,334
December 23	5:00 p.m.	vs. No. 23 Utah*		Qualcomm Stadium; San Diego, CA (Poinsettia Bowl)	ESPN	L 27–37	32,665
*Non-conference game; ^{†}Homecoming; Rankings from AP Poll; All times are in Pacific time

== Game summaries ==
=== Maryland ===
	1	2	3	4	Total
Terrapins	3	3	7	0	13
#12 Golden Bears	14	17	14	7	52

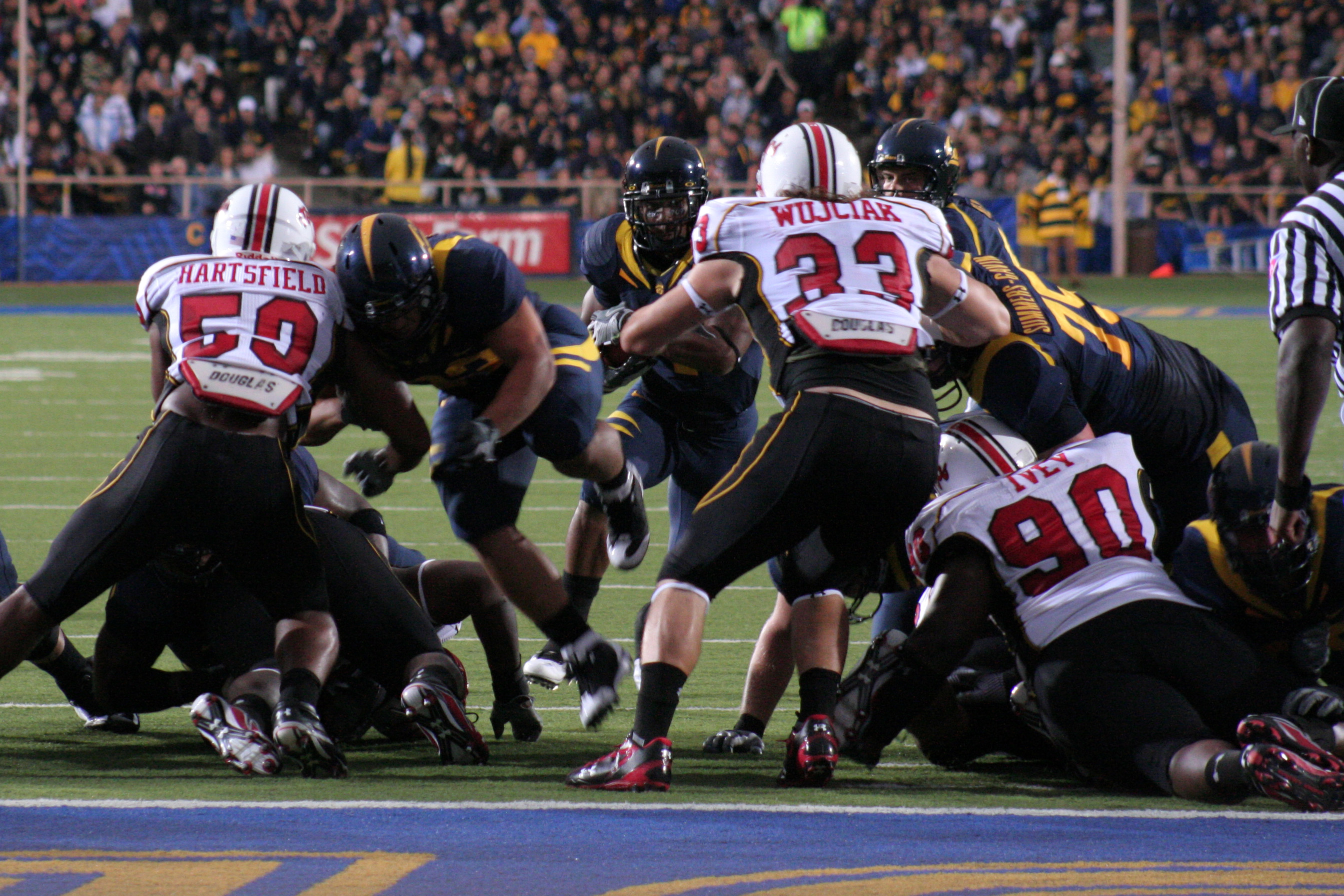
Jahvid Best (center) about to score a 2-yard touchdown in the first quarter.

Cal's home opener was a rematch against Maryland, the Terrapins having won an upset of the then ranked #25 Bears in Cal's third game of the 2008 season at College Park. With a 7:00 p.m. PDT start, it was the Terrapins' turn to make an adjustment to the time change. The Bears played with their last names on their uniforms, a departure from the 2008 season when they had their numbers only.

Cal jumped to an early lead in the first quarter when Jahvid Best broke free for a 73-yard touchdown run on the first play of Cal's second possession. On the ensuing kickoff, the Bears recovered a fumble by Maryland returner Torrey Smith, resulting in Best's second touchdown run of the game from 2 yards. A 47-yard kickoff return by Smith helped set up the Terrapins' first points of the game with a field goal.

Both teams traded a field goal apiece in the second quarter. The Bears then capitalized on a sack of quarterback Chris Turner that led to a fumble recovery. While avoiding a sack from defender Jared Harrell, Kevin Riley threw his first touchdown pass of the game to Skyler Curran. Riley then connected with Nyan Boateng on a 39-yard pass with 31 seconds left in the quarter to make it 31–6 at the half.

Cal added a pair of touchdowns in the third quarter, the first on an 11-yard run from Shane Vereen. After Maryland attempted a fourth down conversion on the Cal 40-yard line and failed, Riley connected with Marvin Jones for a 42-yard touchdown. The Terrapins' final points of the game came on a 39-yard run by Da'Rel Scott. Early in the fourth quarter Riley threw a 15-yard touchdown pass to Vereen for Cal's final score of the game. The Bears then pulled their starters as both teams traded possessions.

Kevin Riley threw for 298 yards and four touchdowns, each to a different receiver. Jahvid Best rushed for 137 yards and a pair of touchdowns. Chris Turner threw for 167 yards and was sacked six times. Da'Rel Scott, the second-leading rusher in the Atlantic Coast Conference during the 2008 season, was held to 90 rushing yards with one touchdown. The loss was the Terrapins' most lopsided season opener since 1892, when they lost to St. John's of Annapolis 50–0.

=== Eastern Washington ===
	1	2	3	4	Total
Eagles	7	0	0	0	7
#10 Golden Bears	7	17	14	21	59

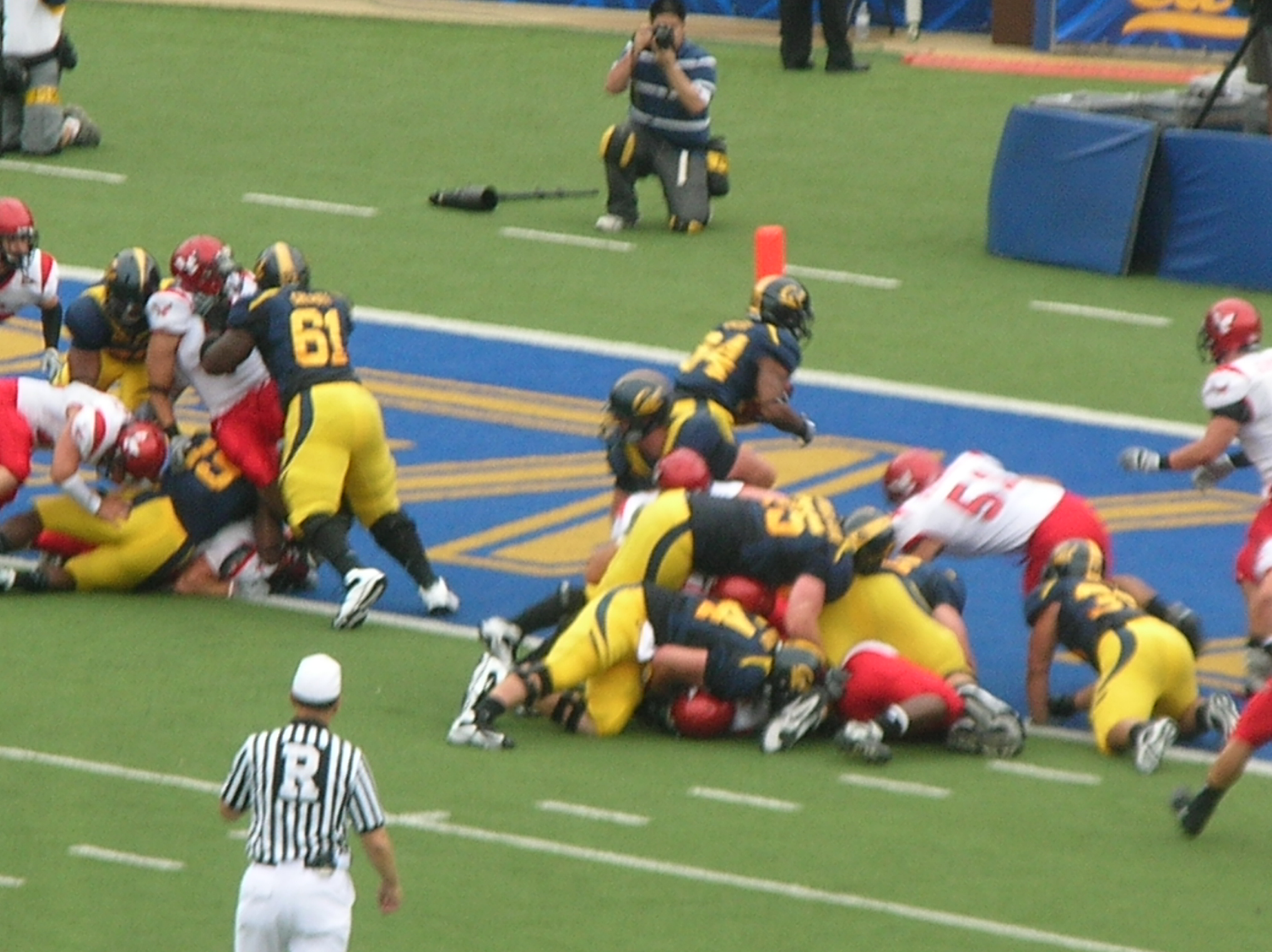
Running back Shane Vereen (no. 34) scores one of his three rushing touchdowns against the Eagles.

The Bears faced the #17 FCS ranked Eagles for the first time. Cal scored first on a 1-yard run by Kevin Riley, followed by the Eagles marching downfield led by quarterback Matt Nichols to tie the game on a 4-yard pass to Grant Williams. The Eagles were able to hold the Bears offensively in the first quarter, however after Shane Vereen made his first of three rushing touchdowns in the beginning of the second quarter, the Bears took control of the game. One the ensuing possession, Nichols was sacked by Mike Mohammed and fumbled. Linebacker Mychal Kendricks recovered the fumble for a 45-yard return, which resulted in a field goal. Kevin Riley then connected with Jahvid Best on the Bears' next possession for a 22-yard touchdown, the only touchdown of the game the Bears scored through the air. Cal led 24–7 at the half.

Cal opened the third quarter with Best scoring his second touchdown of the game on a 1-yard run and scored on the ensuing possession when Shane Vereen scored his second touchdown from 2 yards. Eastern Washington replaced Nichols with Jeff Minnerly, but he was unable to lead the Eagles offensively, and was replaced in the fourth quarter by Scott Burgett. This proved to be the most productive quarter for the Bears, with Vereen scoring his third touchdown from two yards, wide receiver Isi Sofele making a 22-yard touchdown run, and Covaughn DeBoskie-Johnson making a 1-yard run. The Eagles were able to drive to the Cal 23 with over 5 minutes left in the quarter, but missed a 40-yard field goal attempt.

The Bears amassed 339 rushing yards, with seven of the Bears' touchdowns coming on the ground, from five different players. Best finished the game with 142 rushing yards, a rushing touchdown, and a receiving touchdown. Shane Vereen had three rushing touchdowns, the first time in his career that he had a multiple rushing touchdown game. Riley had 151 passing yards with one passing touchdown and one rushing touchdowns. The Bears stifled the Eagles' run game, holding them to 21 rushing yards, and made four sacks against all three of the Eagles' quarterbacks. Starter Matt Nichols passed for 197 yards and the Eagles' lone score. The game marked the first time the Bears scored 50 or more points in back to back games since 1947.

=== Minnesota ===
	1	2	3	4	Total
#8 Golden Bears	14	7	0	14	35
Golden Gophers	0	14	7	0	21

Cal's first road game was the second played at Minnesota's brand new TCF Bank Stadium. The Bears dominated the first quarter, scoring on their first possession when Jahvid Best scored on a 34-yard touchdown run, and on their ensuing possession on a 2-yard run from Best. The Gophers got on the board on their first play of the second quarter on a 26-yard touchdown pass from Adam Weber to Eric Decker. The Bears were then able to drive downfield, but missed a 47-yard field goal. Cal scored on its next possession on a 27-yard run from Best, while Minnesota scored before the half when Weber connected with Decker again for a 13-yard touchdown with less than a minute left.

The Gophers put the lone score of the third quarter on a 7-yard touchdown pass from Decker to MarQueis Gray. With the game tied at 21 all, the fourth quarter belonged to the Bears. Best scored two touchdowns from short yardage, while the Cal defense intercepted Weber three times, one setting up a touchdown, and the other two within the final two minutes of the game.

The victory, which placed Cal into the top 10, was only the second win in the last ten road games, snapping a four-game losing streak of road contests. Best, who rushed for 131 yards, set a modern school record and a career-high with five rushing touchdowns. Kevin Riley threw for 252 yards, while the Bear defense held the Gophers to 37 yards rushing. Gophers quarterback Adam Weber threw for 226 yards and two touchdowns, including three interceptions. The Bears' leading receiver in 2008, Nyan Boateng, broke his foot during the first half of the game and is expected to miss four to six weeks.

=== Oregon ===
	1	2	3	4	Total
#6 Golden Bears	3	0	0	0	3
Ducks	3	22	14	3	42

The Bears put their new #6 ranking on the line against the unranked Ducks, who had beaten #14 Utah the previous week, snapping the Utes' 16-game winning streak. On the opening kickoff, the Bears recovered a fumble which they were able to convert into a field goal for their only score of the game. The Ducks also responded with a field goal. Oregon dominated Cal for the next three quarters. The Ducks opened the second quarter with a 26-yard touchdown pass from Jeremiah Masoli to tight end Ed Dickson, with a successful two-point conversion. On the ensuing possession, the Bears were unable to capitalize on a 45-yard kickoff return by Shane Vereen when a 43-yard field goal attempt missed. Cal was able to recover an Oregon fumble on the ensuing possession, but gave the ball right back when Kevin Riley fumbled. The Ducks converted the turnover into points on a 1-yard run from Remene Alston. Oregon struck again when running back LaMichael James scored on a 4-yard run with a minute left in the half to make it 25–3 Oregon.

The second half belonged to the Ducks, who scored two touchdowns in the third quarter on 9- and 36-yard touchdown passes from Masoli to Dickson. The Bears struggled offensively and were unable to add to their score. Freshman quarterback Beau Sweeney stepped in for Riley late in the fourth quarter, which resulted in him moving up in the depth chart as the #2 quarterback.

Oregon dominated Cal, outgaining the Bears with 524 yards of total offense to the Bears' 207. Jahvid Best was held to 55 rushing yards while Kevin Riley threw for 123 yards and was sacked four times. Oregon quarterback Jeremiah Masoli threw for 253 yards and three touchdowns, all of them to Ed Dickson, who had a career best 148 receiving yards. Running back LaMichael James had 118 yards rushing with one touchdown. The loss snapped a three-game winning streak against Oregon and the 39 point difference was the most since a loss to USC in 2001. It was also the worst sustained by Jeff Tedford in his coaching career at Cal, dropping the Bears 18 spots in the AP Polls to #24.

=== Southern California ===
	1	2	3	4	Total
#7 Trojans	10	10	3	7	30
#24 Golden Bears	0	0	0	3	3

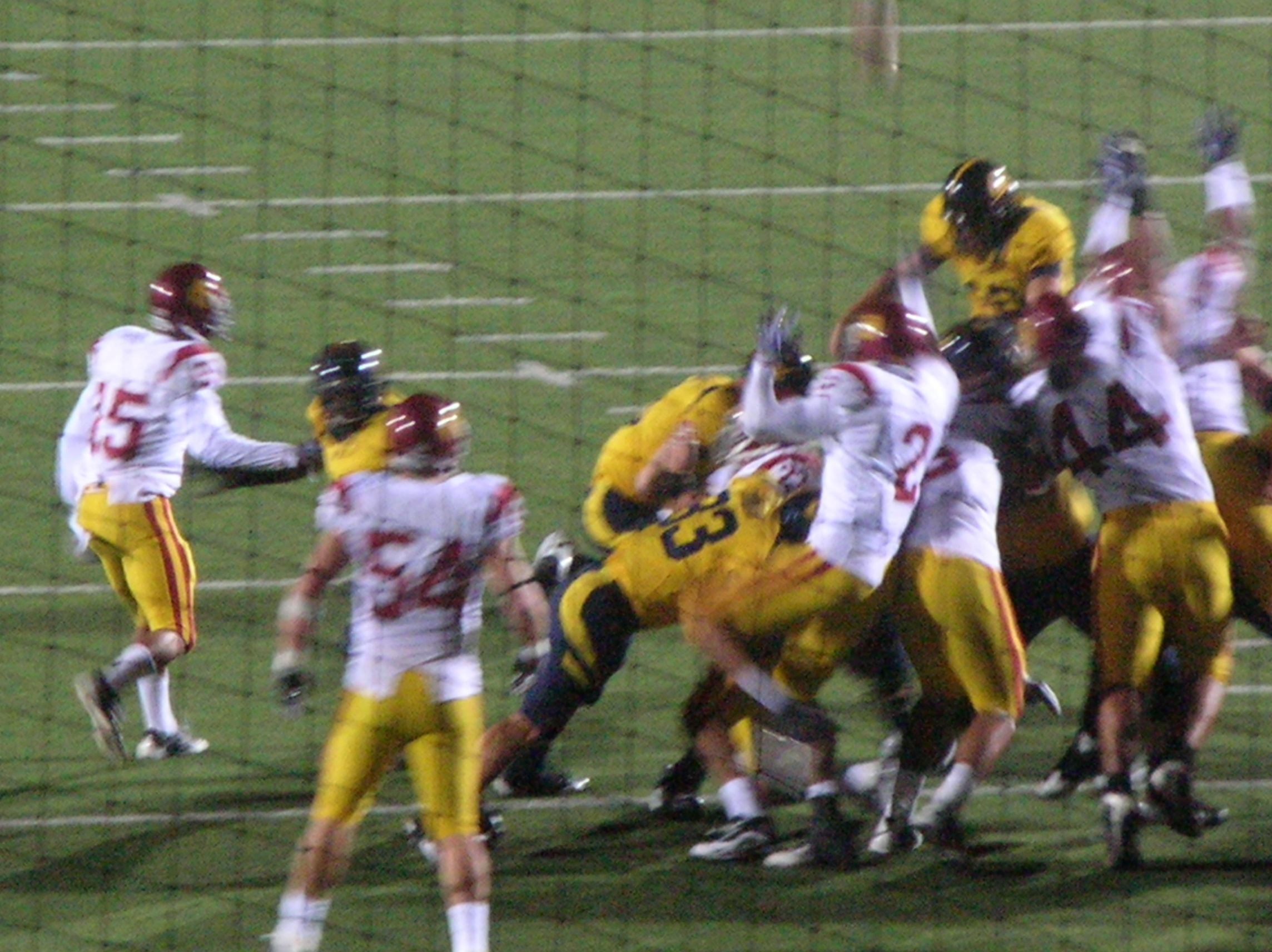
The Bears kick a field goal for their sole score of the game.

Coming off a huge upset the previous week against Oregon, Cal was looking to bounce back against #7 USC. The Bears were able to drive downfield on their first possession after taking the opening kickoff. However, after Kevin Riley threw his first interception of the season to USC safety Taylor Mays in the end zone, the Bears, would remain scoreless until the fourth quarter. The Trojans capitalized on the turnover, with Joe McKnight breaking free for a 38-yard touchdown. Following a USC field goal, the Trojans attempted a fourth down conversion in the closing seconds of the first quarter, but were held by the Bears. Cal however was unable to move the ball and after being driven back to their 24-yard line by a 15-yard penalty, were forced to punt. USC wide receiver Damian Williams then returned the punt 66 yards for a touchdown and the Trojans added a field goal late in the second quarter. Cal was able to drive downfield in the final minute and a half to the USC 21-yard line, but missed a 38-yard field goal to make it 20–0 at the half. The Bears were able to hold the Trojans to a field goal in the third quarter, ending a streak of six scoreless quarters by kicking a field goal in the fourth quarter. The final Trojan score came on a four-yard rushing touchdown by Joe McKnight.

The Bears were held to just a field goal for the second week in a row, with Jahvid Best being held to 48 yards, even less than he was able to gain the previous week. Riley passed for 198 yards and an interception. The Bears were held to 88 total rushing yards, while USC's Joe McKnight rushed for 121 yards and two scores. Matt Barkley passed for 282 yards. The game marked the first time that the Bears had been held out of the end zone at home since 1998 and was the third time during Jeff Tedford's tenure as head coach that Cal failed to score a touchdown, the second time being the previous week.

=== UCLA ===
	1	2	3	4	Total
Golden Bears	14	21	3	7	45
Bruins	7	13	6	0	26

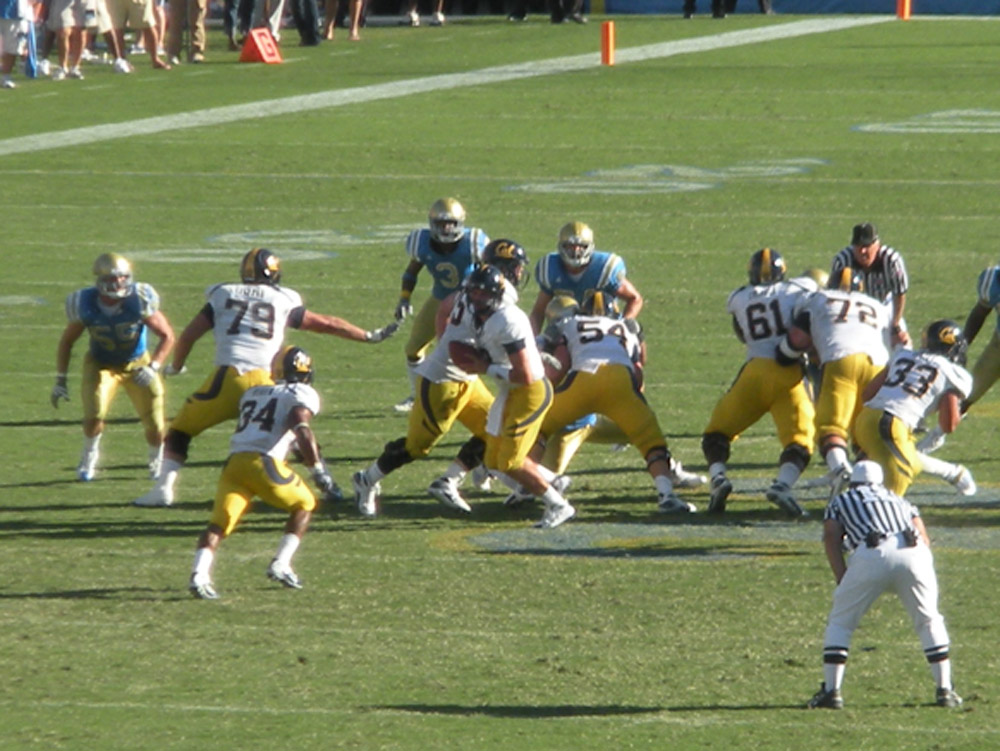
Shane Vereen (no. 34) takes the handoff from Kevin Riley (no. 13)

Following a bye week and two consecutive blowout losses, the Bears faced the Bruins in Los Angeles. Both teams came in with a 3–2 overall record and were looking for their first conference win. The Bears scored their first touchdown in three games on their opening possession, when running back Shane Vereen was able to run 42 yards for a score. The Bears then recovered a fumble caused by a sack of Bruins quarterback Kevin Prince, which set up a 43-yard touchdown pass from Kevin Riley to Marvin Jones. UCLA responded on the ensuing possession with a 48-yard kickoff return by Terrence Austin which helped set up a 7-yard run by Jonathan Franklin. In the second quarter, Cal scored first when Riley connected with Jahvid Best for a 51-yard touchdown. UCLA countered when Franklin was able to break free for a 74-yard touchdown run on the following possession. After being pinned at the Cal 7-yard line following a UCLA punt, Best had his first rushing touchdown in three games when he was able to run for a 93-yard score, the third longest touchdown run in school history. Both teams then traded scoring drives, with a Bruins field goal coming after, Riley connecting with Marvin Jones for a 24-yard score, and another Bruins field goal to close out the half. The second half was much quieter, with both teams scoring on field goals in the third quarter, and the final score of the game coming in the fourth when Mychael Kendricks intercepted Prince for a 69-yard touchdown return.

Cal won for the first time in Southern California during Jeff Tedford's tenure as head coach, having previously been 0–7 against UCLA and USC while on the road. Riley finished with 205 yards passing and three touchdowns, two of them to Marvin Jones. Shane Vereen finished with a career-high 154 rushing yards and a score, while Jahvid Best also broke the century mark with 102 rushing yards and a score. For the Bruins, Kevin Prince threw for 313 yards, while Johnathan Franklin rushed for 101 yards and two scores.

=== Washington State ===
	1	2	3	4	Total
Cougars	3	14	0	0	17
Golden Bears	28	7	7	7	49

The Cougars were looking for their first conference win and faced the Bears on the road. Cal wide receiver Jeremy Ross returned the opening kickoff for 54 yards, which set up the first score of the day for the Bears on a 27-yard touchdown pass from Kevin Riley to Jahvid Best. On their next possession, Riley connected with Marvin Jones for a 37-yard touchdown. The Bears scored again when Ross took a Cougars punt 76 yards for a touchdown. Following a Washington State field goal, Riley threw a 21-yard touchdown to Shane Vereen. In the second quarter, Best got his first rushing touchdown of the day on a 61-yard run. The Cougars were able to score in back to back possessions, with Jeff Tuel throwing a 68-yard touchdown pass to Johnny Forzani, then a 19-yard touchdown pass to Gino Simone. The Cougars were unable to put up any more points in the second half, although Riley threw an interception in the third quarter. Best got his second rushing touchdown of the game in the third quarter, while Shane Vereen rushed for one in the fourth.

Kevin Riley threw for 229 yards and three touchdowns, while Jahvid Best rushed for 159 yards and two scores, with one touchdown reception. Cougars quarterback Jeff Tuel threw for 354 yards and two scores. The victory was Cal's fifth in a row over Washington State. The Bears put up a season high 559 total yards of offense, while the Cougars remained winless in conference play. While unranked in the AP Top 25 as a result of the win, the Bears earned a #24 BCS ranking.

=== Arizona State ===
	1	2	3	4	Total
Golden Bears	14	3	3	3	23
Sun Devils	0	14	0	7	21

Both Cal and Arizona State entered the game with a 2–2 conference record. On the Bears' opening possession, the Sun Devils recovered a fumble by Kevin Riley, but were unable to convert it into points. Cal struck quickly, scoring on the ensuing possession when Riley connected with Jahvid Best for an 11-yard touchdown. This was followed up by a 12-yard pass to Marvin Jones on the Bears' third possession. In the second quarter, Sun Devils running back Ryan Bass fumbled on the Cal 2-yard line, which the Bears recovered. However Cal gave the ball right back when Riley fumbled on the 3-yard line. This time Arizona State capitalized, with third-string quarterback Samson Szakacsy connecting with Jovon Williams for a 3-yard score. Cal was then able to drive downfield, but Giorgio Tavecchio missed a 34-yard field goal. Arizona State quarterback Danny Sullivan then connected with Kyle Williams for an 80-yard score. The Bears' sole score of the quarter was a 25-yard field goal to make it 17–14 at the half set up by a 38-yard interception return by Syd'Quan Thompson.

The sole score of the third quarter came on a 51-yard field goal by Tavecchio set up by an interception of Sullivan by Eddie Young. Arizona State took their only lead of the game when Cameron Marshall ran in for a 6-yard touchdown in the fourth quarter. After Tavecchio missed a 39-yard field goal, Cal was able to drive downfield in the closing minutes of the fourth quarter and Tavecchio made the game winning 24-yard field goal with 21 seconds left. A Sun Devils comeback attempt was stifled when Sullivan was sacked by Tyson Alualu.

The victory brought the Bears back into the Top 25 at #23 and moved them up in the BCS Rankings to #20. Both teams combined for 238 yards on 23 penalties, with five total turnovers. Riley threw for 351 yards and two touchdowns, while Best had one receiving touchdown but was held to 63 rushing yards. For the Sun Devils, Sullivan passed for 244 yards and a touchdown. Marshall had 71 yards rushing and a touchdown.

=== Oregon State ===
	1	2	3	4	Total
Beavers	7	14	3	7	31
#23 Golden Bears	0	7	0	7	14

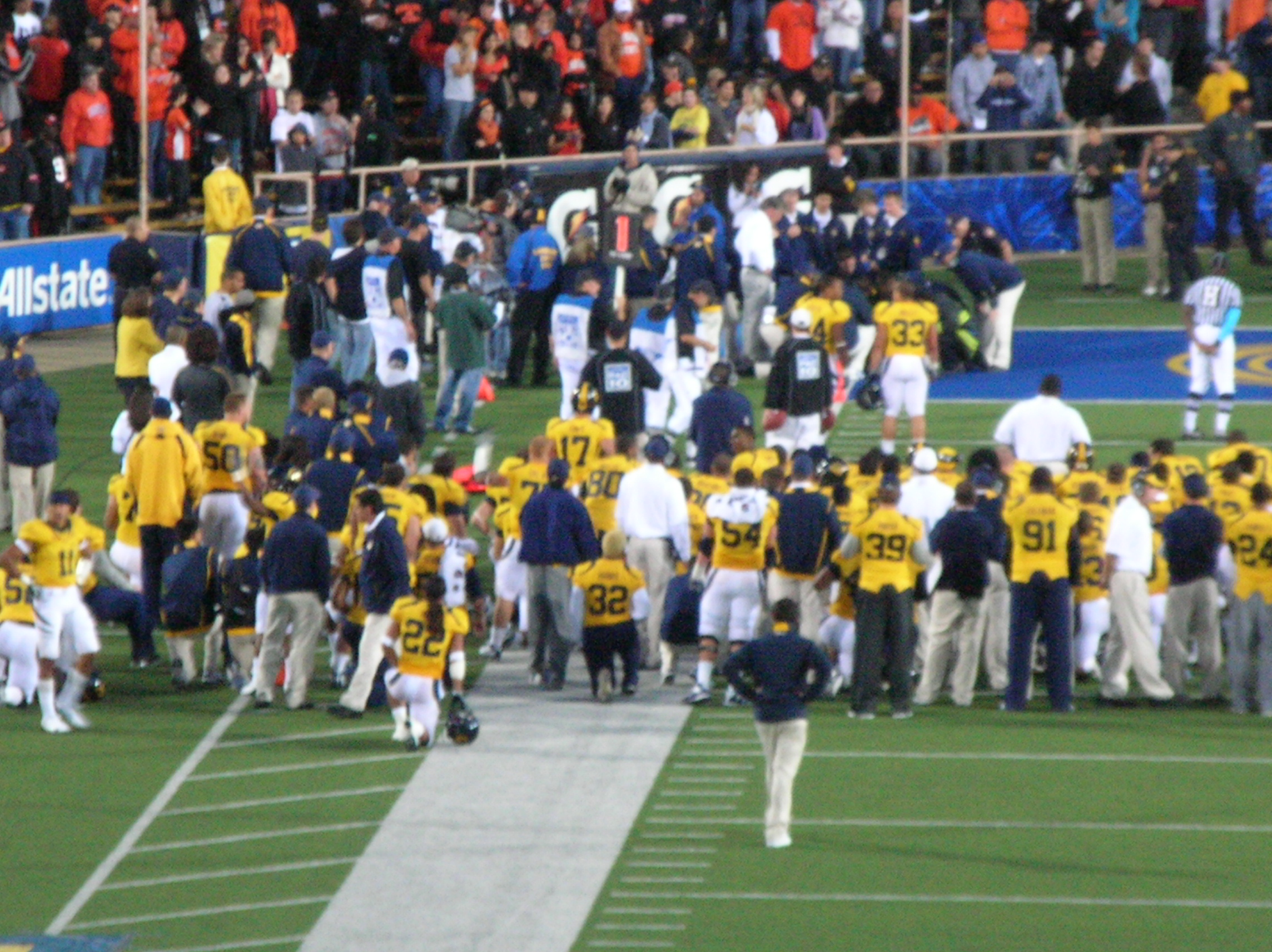
The Bears watch and wait while medical staff attend to Jahvid Best after he sustained a concussion in the second quarter.

The #23 ranked Bears had not defeated the Beavers in Memorial Stadium since 1997, and with their last win in the series occurring in 2006 in Corvallis, Oregon. Oregon State drove downfield on their second possession of the game and scored on a 1-yard quarterback keeper by Sean Canfield. The Beavers scored again 1 minute into the second quarter when Canfield passed to James Rodgers for 15 yards. The Bears responded by marching downfield in a drive that consumed more than 7 minutes. Jahvid Best was able to score on a direct snap from 7 yards out, but sustained a severe concussion when while hurdling defender Tim Clark, he was pushed in the air by safety Cameron Collins, causing him to fall on his right shoulder and neck. The game was halted for nearly 15 minutes while Best was attended to, eventually being taken to a local hospital. Oregon State came back after play resumed to extend their lead to 21–7 when Canfield threw a 3-yard pass to Jordan Bishop in the final two minutes of the half.

In the third quarter, Sean Canfield threw an interception on the Cal 1-yard line, but Kevin Riley was intercepted in turn, which the Beavers were able to convert into a field goal. In the fourth quarter, Oregon State put together a scoring drive over six minutes long that culminated in a 24-yard touchdown run by Jacquizz Rodgers. With the game out of reach, Riley led the Bears on a drive lasting less than a minute that ended in a 2-yard touchdown pass to Verran Tucker with a minute left to play. An attempt at an onside kick was recovered by Oregon State, and Canfield took two straight knees to end the game.

In the Bears' fifth straight loss to the Beavers, Riley threw for 200 yards and a score, while Best was held to 29 yards and 9 carries. Oregon State's victory made them bowl eligible, with Canfield passing for 342 yards and two scores, making this game the third straight that the Bears had given up more than 300 passing yards. Jacquizz Rodgers, the 2008 Pac-10 Offensive Player of the Year, was held to a season low 67 rushing yards.

=== Arizona ===
	1	2	3	4	Total
#18 Wildcats	0	10	0	6	16
Golden Bears	3	6	6	9	24

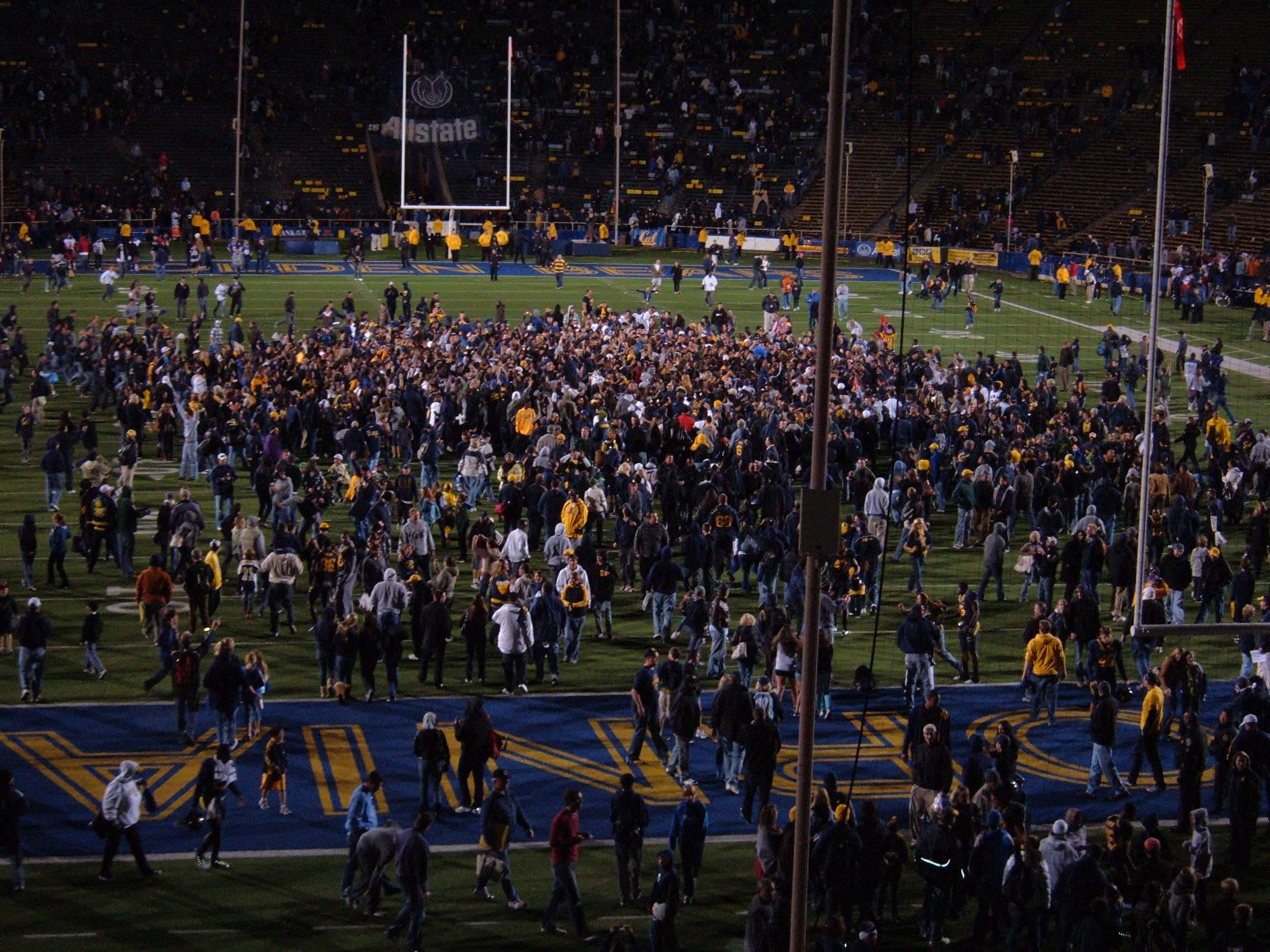
Cal fans rush the field after the victory

In their final home season game, the Bears started backup running back Shane Vereen in place of Jahvid Best, who was still recovering from a concussion sustained the previous week. The #18 ranked Wildcats were also missing their starting running back, Nic Grigsby. The Bears capped off their opening first quarter drive with a 46-yard field goal by Giorgio Tavecchio and were able to recover a Wildcat fumble late in the quarter, which resulted in another field goal to begin the second quarter. Arizona responded late in the quarter with a 1-yard rushing touchdown by Keola Antolin which was followed up by a 36-yard field goal. With less than 30 seconds left in the half, the Bears were able to drive downfield and enable Tavecchio to kick a 46-yard field goal to make it 10–9 Wildcats.

The third quarter started out promisingly for Cal when Josh Hill intercepted Nick Foles. However Tavecchio missed a 46-yard field goal attempt and Kevin Riley was intercepted on the Bears' next possession by Cam Nelson. The Bears defense however was able to hold the Wildcats and Cal capitalized on a 14-yard punt when Riley connected with Skylar Curran for a 27-yard touchdown, with the two-point conversion attempt failing. Riley threw another interception late in the quarter which the Wildcats were able to convert into a touchdown early in the fourth on an 8-yard reception by A.J. Simmons. An attempt at a two-point conversion also failed. The Bears responded by marching downfield in a lengthy drive consuming more than seven minutes that resulted in a field goal. The Wildcats were unable to take advantage of a 37-yard kickoff return by Travis Cobb and turned the ball over on downs. Vereen was then able to break free for a 61-yard touchdown run with 1:30 left in the game. However, the extra point attempt was botched, leaving Arizona with the possibility of forcing overtime with a touchdown and successful two-point conversion with just over a minute to play. The Bear defense however was able to preserve the lead, sacking Foles twice.

Riley threw for 181 yards and a score, with two interceptions. Vereen had 30 carries for 159 yards, both career highs, including one score. The Bears defense managed to sack Arizona quarterback Nick Foles three times. Foles had only been sacked four times before all season before the game. He threw for 201 yards and a score, while Antolin, who had rushed for 149 yards against the Bears in 2008, was held to 78 yards and a score. The Bears' fourth straight victory over the Wildcats at Memorial Stadium moved them up to #25 in the BCS rankings.

=== Stanford ===
	1	2	3	4	Total
Golden Bears	3	7	14	10	34
#14 Cardinal	14	0	7	7	28

Both teams faced each other in the 112th Big Game with seven wins each, the first time this had happened since 1991, with #17 Stanford favored over #25 Cal. The Cardinal had scored a combined 106 points in two previous games against higher ranked opponents, with consecutive upsets over Oregon and USC, two teams which had blown out Cal 42–3 and 30–3, respectively. Cal also played its second game without star running back Jahvid Best, again starting backup Shane Vereen.

The Cardinal scored on their first possession when Toby Gerhart broke free on the game's third play for a 61-yard touchdown. After successfully blocking a punt, which gave Stanford great field position on the Cal 19-yard line, Gerhart scored again on a 2-yard run. The Bears responded with a scoring drive of their own that resulted in a field goal. In the second quarter, a Cal drive was halted when Richard Sherman intercepted Kevin Riley deep in Stanford territory. The Cardinal were unable to capitalize on the turnover however, and the Bears went on a five-minute scoring drive that saw Vereen score his first touchdown of the game on a 1-yard run with just over a minute left in the quarter to make it 14–10 Stanford at the half.

Cal took the lead in the third quarter with a 92-yard scoring drive resulting in a 4-yard run by Vereen. Stanford was able to move downfield in turn, but missed a 45-yard field goal. The Bears marched downfield again and scored on a 3-yard run by Vereen. Stanford responded on the ensuing possession by scoring on a 1-yard run by Gerhart. The Bears in turn scored in the beginning of the fourth quarter with a 12-yard pass from Riley to Marvin Jones. Midway through the quarter, the Cardinal put together an 87-yard touchdown drive which resulted in Gerhart getting his fourth score of the game on a 5-yard run. After getting the ball back with just under 4 minutes left in the game, Stanford attempted a fourth down conversion which failed. The Bears took possession on the Stanford 23-yard line, but ended up settling for a field goal, making the score 34–28 and giving the Cardinal a chance to win with more than two and a half minutes left if they could score a touchdown. Stanford started out with good field position at its 42-yard line and was able to drive down to the Cal 13-yard line. Cal linebacker Mike Mohamed saved the game for the Bears when he intercepted Cardinal quarterback Andrew Luck, allowing Riley to take three straight knees and Cal to retain the Stanford Axe.

The victory marked two milestones for Jeff Tedford's tenure as coach at California; this was his 100th game and his 67th victory, tying Pappy Waldorf for the most wins at Cal in the modern era. Riley threw for 235 yards and a score, while Vereen had another career game, rushing for 193 yards on 42 carries with three scores. The loss, as well as a double overtime win later in the day by Oregon over Arizona, eliminated Stanford from Rose Bowl contention and the possibility of sharing the Pac-10 conference title. Luck threw for 157 yards, while Gerhart rushed for 136 yards and all of Stanford's four touchdowns, tying a single Big Game record previously set by Cal players Chuck Muncie and Lindsey Chapman.

=== Washington ===
	1	2	3	4	Total
#19 Golden Bears	3	0	7	0	10
Huskies	7	14	14	7	42

The Bears entered their final game of the regular season after a bye week following the Big Game, with the Huskies also coming off a victory in their rivalry game after regaining the Apple Cup from archrival Washington State the previous week. Star running back Jahvid Best missed his third straight game since sustaining a severe concussion against Oregon State on November 7. Cal drove 78 yards on the opening possession, but missed a 42-yard field goal. Washington quickly responded with a 40-yard touchdown pass from Jake Locker to Jermaine Kearse, and from then on held onto the lead. The Bears' sole score of the first half came on their second possession with a 29-yard field goal. In the second quarter, Locker scored twice on a 19-yard run and 2-yard run, to make it 21–3 Huskies at the half.

Washington opened the second half with a score on a 21-yard pass from Locker to Devin Aguilar. Cal responded on the ensuing possession for their only score of the second half on a 22-yard touchdown pass from Riley to Nyan Boateng. The Huskies came right back with a scoring drive on their own on a 13-yard pass from Locker to Aguilar. The Bears were unable to capitalize on a 65-yard kickoff return by Isi Sofele and a fourth down conversion attempt was halted at the Washington 13-yard line with six and a half minutes left in the third quarter. The Huskies shut down the Bear offense for the rest of the game, recovering two fumbles by Riley in the fourth quarter and scoring late in the game on a 10-yard run by Chris Polk.

The loss dropped Cal to fifth place in the Pac-10 standings, tying the Bears with USC, who lost earlier to Arizona. Riley passed for 215 yards and a touchdown, but was sacked five times. Shane Vereen was held to 92 rushing yards. The Huskies' Jake Locker threw for 248 yards and three scores, while rushing for 77 yards and two touchdowns. Running back Chris Polk rushed for 93 yards and a score, while defensive end Daniel Te’o-Neshehim, who had three sacks on Riley, came out of the game as Washington's career sack leader with 30. The victory was Washington's second over a ranked opponent since upsetting #3 USC at home on September 19. The Huskies became just the eleventh FBS team since 1946 to follow a winless season with five victories.

=== Poinsettia Bowl ===
	1	2	3	4	Total
#23 Utes	7	17	3	10	37
Golden Bears	14	0	7	6	27

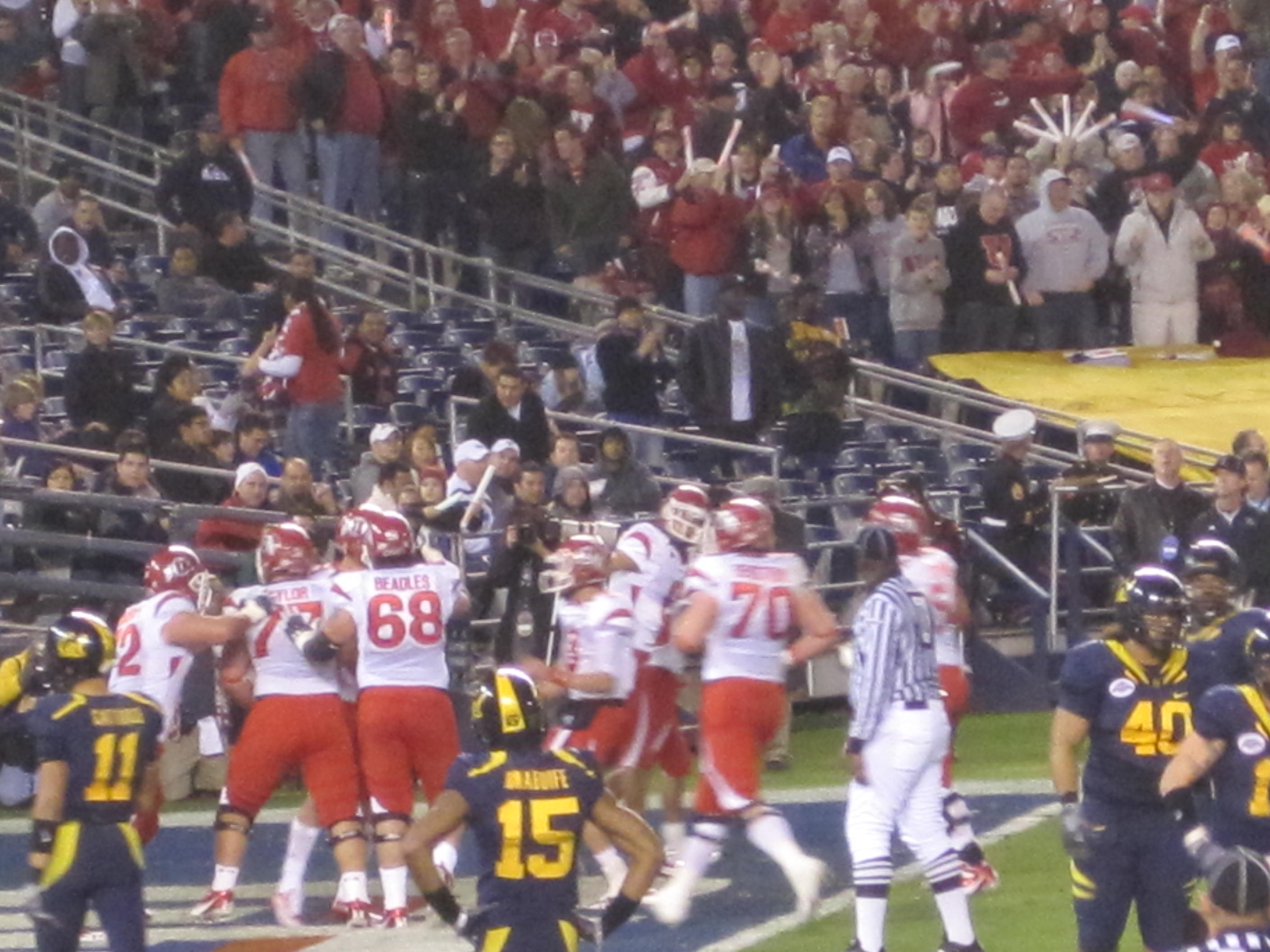
Kendrick Moeai scores a touchdown for the Utes.

Cal played its third bowl game in San Diego in six years, having made two previous trips to the Holiday Bowl in 2004 and 2006. The Bears had not lost a bowl game since 2004. Running back Jahvid Best did not play in the Poinsettia Bowl, missing his fourth straight game. Utah entered the matchup with eight straight bowl victories, the longest post-season winning streak in the nation. The Utes also faced their former offensive coordinator, Andy Ludwig, who had helped guide them the previous year to a 13–0 record and #2 ranking.

The game started promisingly for the Bears, who were able to hold the Utes on their first two possessions. Midway through the first quarter, Cal scored first on a 36-yard run by Shane Vereen. The Bears quickly struck again when linebacker Eddie Young intercepted Jordan Wynn for a 30-yard touchdown return on the ensuing possession. From this point on however, the game belonged to the Utes. Utah's comeback began with a 61-yard kickoff return by Shaky Smithson that helped set up the first touchdown pass of the night for Wynn on a 6-yard strike to Kendrick Moeai. Cal struggled offensively in the second quarter and could not get past midfield. Utah scored on all three of its possessions with a field goal, 15-yard touchdown reception by Moeai, and 21-yard touchdown reception by Jereme Brooks. The Utes led 24–14 at the half and had scored 24 unanswered points.

The second half saw the game seesaw back and forth defensively until Kevin Riley was sacked, resulting in a fumble which the Utes recovered late in the third quarter. Cal was able to hold Utah to a field goal and responded on the next possession by driving downfield, allowing Vereen to score his second touchdown of the night on a 1-yard run. Utah put up the first points of the fourth quarter on a field goal, and Stevenson Sylvester intercepted Riley on a tipped pass that he was able to return for a 27-yard touchdown. Riley threw a second straight interception, but the defense was able to hold the Utes. The final score of the game came late in the quarter on a 24-yard touchdown reception by Jeremy Ross to make the score 37–27 Utah. Cal attempted a two-point conversion, which failed. An attempt at an onside kick was recovered by Utah, allowing Wynn to take three straight knees.

Vereen finished with 122 rushing yards and two scores, becoming the seventh Cal running back to rush for 100 yards in a bowl game. Riley threw for 214 yards, accounted for all three Cal turnovers with two interceptions and a fumble, and was sacked four times. The Bears were able to halt the Utes' running game, but had trouble stopping them through the air. Jordan Wynn threw for 338 yards and two scores, with one interception and three sacks. Wide receiver David Reed set school records for catches (81) and receiving yards (1,188) in a season during the game. Cal's loss ended a winning streak of four postseason games. The last bowl game the Bears had lost was in San Diego at the 2004 Holiday Bowl. The Utes extended their post-season winning streak to nine bowl games.

== Aftermath ==
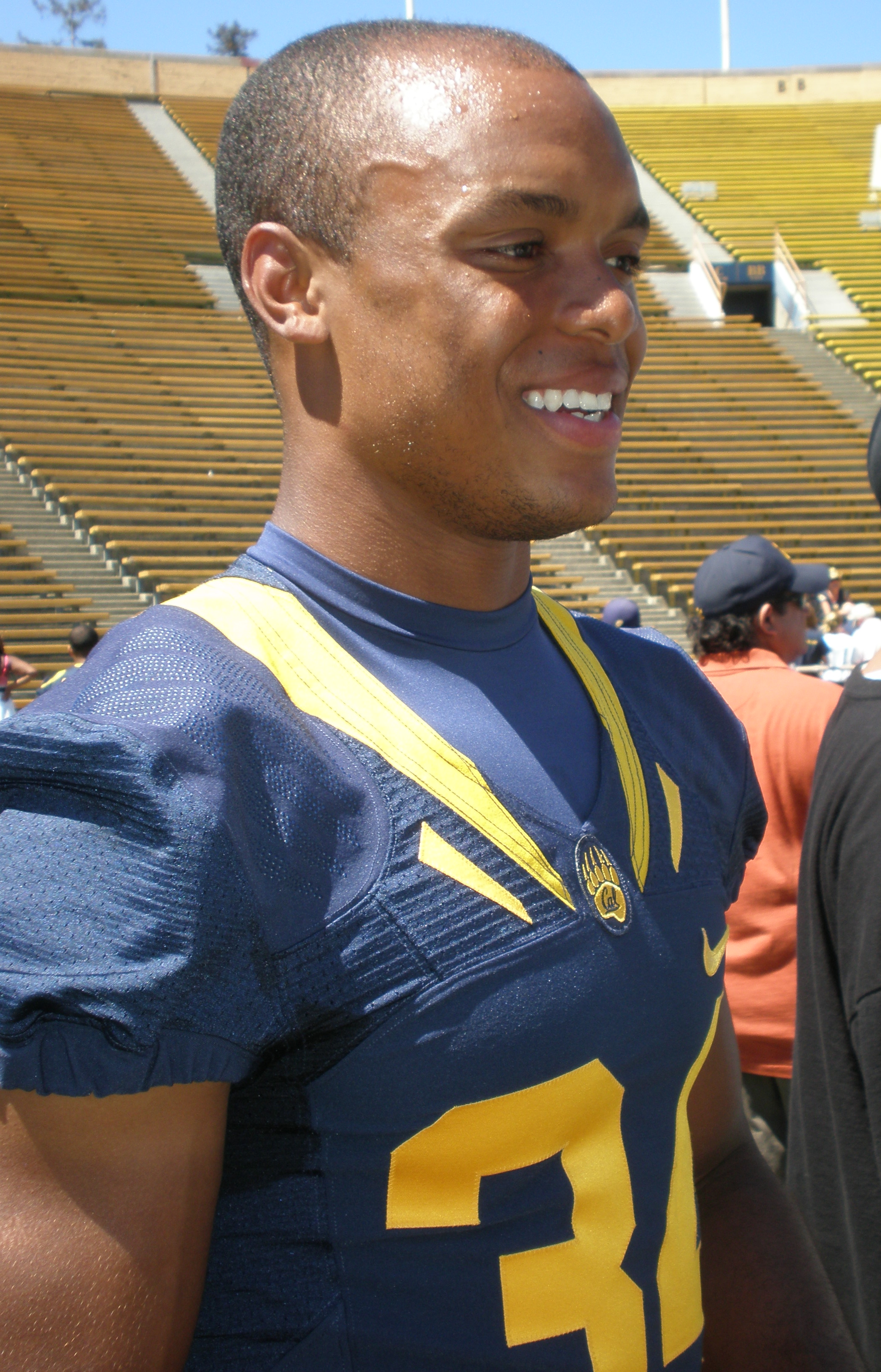
Vereen in August 2009

As a result of the concussion sustained by starting running back Jahvid Best on November 7, Shane Vereen, who had served as the primary backup, stepped into the starting spot for the rest of the year. Best would miss the rest of the season and finished with 867 yards rushing. Vereen finished the season with 952 yards rushing including 122 yards in the Poinsettia Bowl. This ended a seven-year stretch of 1,000-yard rushers going back to head coach Jeff Tedford's first year at Cal in 2002. The Bears lost their first bowl game since 2004, snapping a winning streak of four post-season victories.

The Bears saw several coaching changes. Pete Alamar, special teams and tight ends coach, was not asked back for the 2010 season. The Bears had struggled on special teams all season, ranking ninth in the conference in kick coverage, 48th nationally, and 99th nationally in punt coverage. Placekicker duties during the season alternated between Giorgio Tavecchio and Vince D'Amato, with consistency an issue. Alamar was succeeded by Jeff Genyk.

Defensive coordinator Bob Gregory, who was first hired by head coach Tedford upon Tedford's arrival at Cal in 2002, left the team to become a defensive assistant at Boise State. He was succeeded by Clancy Pendergast, who had been hired by the Oakland Raiders on February 8, 2010, as a defensive assistant. Pendergast had previously been the defensive coordinator for the Kansas City Chiefs and Arizona Cardinals. Former NFL players Akili Smith and Ronnie Bradford joined the Cal coaching staff March 12, 2010 as administrative assistants for the offense and defense, respectively. Tedford had previously coached Smith as a quarterback at Oregon.

Cal was represented at the East–West Shrine Game by Mike Tepper and Verran Tucker, and at the Senior Bowl by Tyson Alualu and Syd'Quan Thompson.

Jahvid Best announced on January 2, 2010, that he forgo his senior year and enter the NFL draft. He was picked by the Detroit Lions as the 30th overall selection in the 2010 NFL draft following Tyson Alualu, who was drafted as the 10th overall selection by the Jacksonville Jaguars. This marked the first time since 2003 that two Cal players had been drafted in the first round of the NFL draft. No other players were drafted until Syd'Quan Thompson was the final Cal player to be picked in the seventh round as the 225th overall selection by the Denver Broncos.

Offensive linemen Chet Teofilo and Mike Tepper signed undrafted free agent contracts with the Dallas Cowboys on April 24. Wide receiver Verran Tucker joined them on April 26, the same day that linebacker Devin Bishop signed a free agent contract with Denver.

== Players ==
=== Depth chart ===
These were the primary starters and backups through the 2009 season.

Defense

FS
Brett Johnson
Sean Cattouse

OLB	ILB	ILB	SLB
Mychal Kendricks	Mike Mohamed	Devin Bishop	⋅
Keith Browner	Jerome Meadows	D.J. Holt	⋅

SS
Marcus Ezeff
Sean Cattouse

CB
Bryant Nnabuife
Darian Hagan

DE	NT	DE
Cameron Jordan	Derrick Hill	Tyson Alualu
Ernest Owusu	Aaron Tipoti	Trevor Guyton

CB
Syd'Quan Thompson
Josh Hill

Offense

WR
Marvin Jones
Nyan Boateng

LT	LG	C	RG	RT
Mike Tepper	Matt Summers-Gavin	Chris Guarnero	Justin Cheadle	Mitchell Schwartz
Donovan Edwards	Mark Boskovich	Dominic Galas	Chet Teofilo	Donovan Edwards

TE
Anthony Miller
Skylar Curran

WR
Jeremy Ross
Verran Tucker

QB
Kevin Riley
Beau Sweeney

Key reserves
QB Brock Mansion
RB Covaughn DeBoskie-Johnson
RB Isi Sofele
WR Alex Lagemann
DB Chris Conte
G Richard Fisher
NT Kendrick Payne

FB
Brian Holley
Will Kapp

RB
Jahvid Best
Shane Vereen

=== Roster ===
(as of October 19, 2009)
Wide receivers: 1 Marvin Jones – Sophomore; 2 Charles Satchell – (redshirt) Freshman; 3 Jeremy Ross – Junior; 5 Alex Lagemann – (redshirt) Sophomore; 7 Quinn Tedford – (redshirt) Freshman; 8 Nyan Boateng – (redshirt) Senior; 81 Ross Bostock – (redshirt) Freshman; 82 Jackson Bouza – Freshman; 84 Michael Calvin – (redshirt) Sophomore; 86 Verran Tucker – Senior; 87 Spencer Hagan – Freshman; Offensive line: 52 Justin Gates – (redshirt) Sophomore; 53 Donovan Edwards – Junior; 54 Chris Guarnero – Junior; 57 Brian Schwenke – Freshman; 58 Chet Teofilo – Senior; 59 Ed Johnston – Freshman; 61 Justin Cheadle – (redshirt) Sophomore; 65 Dominic Galas – (redshirt) Freshman; 66 Charles Ragland – Freshman; 68 Mark Brazinski – Freshman; 70 Mark Boskovich – Junior; 71 Sam DeMartinis – (redshirt) Sophomore; 72 Mitchell Schwartz – (redshirt) Sophomore; 73 Richard Fisher – Junior; 74 T.J. Emery – Sophomore; 75 Matt Summers-Gavin – (redshirt) Freshman; 76 Charles Siddoway – Freshman; 77 Tyler Rigsbee – (redshirt) Freshman; 78 Justin Prueitt – Junior; 79 Mike Tepper – Senior; Tight ends: 19 Jarrett Sparks – (redshirt) Freshman; 44 Tad Smith – Senior; 45 Spencer Ladner – (redshirt) Freshman; 80 Anthony Miller – Sophomore; 83 Skylar Curran – Senior; 89 Garry Graffort – Junior; 99 Savaiʻi Eselu – (redshirt) Sophomore	Quarterbacks: 9 Beau Sweeney – (redshirt) Freshman; 10 Brock Mansion – (redshirt) Sophomore; 13 Kevin Riley – Junior; 14 Ryan Wertenberger – (redshirt) Freshman; 16 Allan Bridgford – Freshman; Running backs: 4 Jahvid Best – Junior; 20 Isi Sofele- Freshman; 21 Kevin Lewis – (redshirt) Freshman; 23 Dasarte Yarnway* – Freshman; 24 Langston Jackson – (redshirt) Freshman; 28 Covaughn DeBoskie – (redshirt) Freshman; 34 Shane Vereen – (redshirt) Sophomore; Fullbacks: 22 Will Kapp – (redshirt) Freshman; 30 Nico Dumont – Freshman; 31 John Tyndall – (redshirt) Sophomore; 32 Jon Harris – Freshman; 33 Brian Holley – Senior; 48 Eric Stevens – (redshirt) Freshman; Defensive ends: 44 Tyson Alualu – Senior; 56 Keni Kaufusi – Freshman; 91 Deandre Coleman – Freshman; 92 Trevor Guyton – Sophomore; 95 Ernest Owusu – (redshirt) Sophomore; 97 Cameron Jordan – Junior; Defensive tackles: 40 Aaron Tipoti – (redshirt) Freshman; 50 Kevin Bemoll – Senior; 57 Austin Clark – Freshman; 76 Derrick Hill – Junior; 77 Michael Costanzo – Junior; 96 Kendrick Payne – (redshirt) Freshman	Linebackers: 3 D.J. Holt – (redshirt) Sophomore; 4 Chris Little – (redshirt) Freshman; 9 Eddie Young – Senior; 10 Devin Bishop – Senior; 13 Jarred Price – Junior; 18 Mike Mohamed – Junior; 22 Ryan Davis – Junior; 30 Mychal Kendricks – Sophomore; 34 J.P. Hurrell – Freshman; 37 Robert Mullins – (redshirt) Freshman; 42 Steven Fanua – Freshman; 43 Charles Johnson – (redshirt) Junior; 45 Nick Rosato – (redshirt) Freshman; 47 Keith Browner – Junior; 55 Jerome Meadows – Junior; 90 Solomona Aigamaua – (redshirt) Sophomore; 93 Dan Camporeale – Freshman; Cornerbacks: 1 Steve Williams – Freshman; 2 Marc Anthony – (redshirt) Freshman; 5 Syd'Quan Thompson – Senior; 15 Bryant Nnabuife – Junior; 17 Chris Conte – Junior; 23 Josh Hill – (redshirt) Freshman; 24 Vachel Samuels – Freshman; 26 Darian Hagan – Junior; 27 Charles Amadi – Junior; Safeties: 6 Alex Logan – Freshman; 7 D.J. Campbell – (redshirt) Sophomore; 8 Chris Moncrease – Sophomore; 11 Sean Cattouse – (redshirt) Sophomore; 20 Jesse Brooks – Senior; 21 Tyre Ellison – (redshirt) Freshman; 28 SaVon Cleveland – (redshirt) Freshman; 25 Brett Johnson – Senior; 29 Marcus Ezeff – Senior; Punters: 19 Bryan Anger – (redshirt) Sophomore; 35 Ryan Theimer – (redshirt) Sophomore; Placekickers: 14 Nick Demopoulos – Junior; 16 Vince D’Amato – Freshman; 40 Giorgio Tavecchio – Sophomore; 46 David Seawright – Sophomore; Long snappers: 39 Clark Porter – Sophomore; 50 Matt Rios – (redshirt) Freshman; 86 Brandon Madueno – Freshman
* Injured; will not play in 2009.

== Awards and honors ==
All-Pacific-10 Conference Team:

- First Team: OL, Mike Tepper; DL, Tyson Alualu; LB, Mike Mohamed; DB, Syd'Quan Thompson; P, Bryan Anger
- Second Team: RB, Jahvid Best
- Honorable mention: S, Sean Cattouse; C, Chris Guarnero; DE, Cameron Jordan; TE, Anthony Miller; OT, Mitchell Schwartz; TB, Shane Vereen

Schwartz was chosen as second-team preseason All-Pac-10 by Lindy, and to third team by Athlon. Phil Steele chose him as preseason, midseason, and postseason third-team All-Pac-10. He received a Pac-10 All-Academic honorable mention, and was awarded the Brick Muller Award as Cal's Most Valuable Offensive Lineman.

== Rankings ==
Ranking movements Legend: ██ Increase in ranking ██ Decrease in ranking — = Not ranked RV = Received votes
	Week															
Poll	Pre	1	2	3	4	5	6	7	8	9	10	11	12	13	14	Final
AP	12	10	8	6	24	—	—	RV	RV	23	—	RV	21	19	RV	—
Coaches	12	10	8	6	19	—	—	RV	RV	23	—	RV	RV	22	RV	—
Harris	Not released				21	RV	RV	RV	RV	22	RV	RV	23	21	RV	Not released
BCS	Not released							—	24	20	—	25	22	19	—	Not released
