= Ernest Owusu =

American gridiron football player (born 1988)

No. 95
- Position: Defensive end

Personal information
- Born: May 26, 1988 (age 38); Burlington, Vermont, U.S.
- Listed height: 6 ft 5 in (1.96 m)
- Listed weight: 270 lb (122 kg)

Career information
- High school: Father Ryan (Nashville, Tennessee)
- College: California
- NFL draft: 2012: undrafted

Career history
- Minnesota Vikings (2012)*; Cleveland Browns (2012)*; Minnesota Vikings (2012)*; Tampa Bay Buccaneers (2012−2013)*; Edmonton Eskimos (2014)*; San Jose SaberCats (2014); Las Vegas Outlaws (2015)
- * Offseason or practice squad member only

Career AFL statistics
- Total tackles: 2.5
- Fumble recoveries: 1
- Stats at ArenaFan.com
- Stats at Pro Football Reference

Ernest John Yaw Owusu, Jr. (born May 26, 1988) is an American former football defensive end.

== Early life ==
Owusu attended Father Ryan High School in Nashville, Tennessee, and played varsity football for four years. After graduating Father Ryan, Owusu attended the Hun School of Princeton for an additional prep year. While at The Hun School, Owusu accumulated 62 tackles, 13 sacks, and 1 interception. He received scholarship offers from 24 Division 1 programs from which he chose the University of California, Berkeley.

== College career ==
Over the course of his college career with the California Golden Bears, Owusu played in 42 games with 18 starts from 2008 to 2011. He recorded 55 tackles, 14.0 tackles for loss (-61 yards), 8.0 sacks (-49 yards), 1 forced fumble, and 5 pass breakups. Owusu earned first-team Pac-12 All-Academic honors as a senior after being a second-team Pac-10 All-Academic selection during both sophomore and junior campaigns. He was a two-time first-team ESPN All-District® 8 pick as a junior and senior.

=== 2007 ===
Redshirted Owusu did not play.

=== 2008 ===
Owusu played in 5 games off the bench, recording 5 tackles, and 1.0 tackle for loss (-3 yards). He had a season-high 4 stops in his collegiate debut against Colorado State . Owusu’s other stop was a tackle for loss (-3 yards) in the regular-season finale vs. Washington. Owusu was second-team Pac-10 All-Academic selection.

=== 2009 ===
Owusu played in 12 games off the bench and finished the season with 7 tackles, a career-high 3.0 tackles for loss (-18 yards), a career-high 2.0 sacks (-15 yards) and one pass breakup. He recorded all of his sacks and tackles for loss in the season-opener vs. Maryland, with the 3.0 tackles for loss tying for the most by a Cal player in 2009 while both were career highs. Owusu had 3 tackles and his first career pass breakup vs. the Terrapins. He added two tackles in the second game of the season vs. Eastern Washington and then one each at UCLA and at Washington in the regular-season finale. Owusu was second-team Pac-10 All-Academic selection.

=== 2010 ===
Owusu played in all 12 games and moved into a primary starting role with starts in each of the season's first 9 games before coming off the bench in the final 3. He recorded a career-high 14 tackles, 2.5 tackles for loss (-10 yards) and 1.5 sacks (-9 yards), as well as a career-high 2 pass breakups. Owusu twice had a career-high-tying four tackles vs. Colorado and UCLA, adding 1.0 tackle for loss and 0.5 sacks for no gain vs. the Buffaloes, and 0.5 tackles for loss (-1 yard) and a quarterback hurry against the Bruins. He had a pair of tackles in back-to-back contests at Oregon State and Washington State, also picking up a sack for 9 yards against the Beavers. Owusu had single tackles vs. Arizona State and Washington, as well as a pass breakups at Nevada and vs. Oregon. He had a huge year in the classroom, earning first-team ESPN All-District® 8 and second-team Pac-10 All-Academic selections.

=== 2011 ===
Owusu played in all 13 games with nine starts, contributing 30 tackles to rank second among the team's defensive linemen behind Trevor Guyton. He also second on the team with 4.5 sacks (-25 yards) and fourth with 7.5 tackles for loss (-30). Owusu added a forced fumble, two pass breakups and a quarterback hurry. He had his biggest game of the season at Oregon with a career-high seven tackles, a season-high-tying 2.0 tackles for loss for a season-high 12 yards, a sack for a season-high 10 yards, a forced fumble and a pass breakup. Owusu had four tackles each at Colorado, vs. Utah and vs. Oregon State. He added a sack against both the Beavers (-9 yards) and Utes (-2 yards), as well as a total of 2.0 tackles for loss (-4 yards) against the Utes and 1.0 tackle for loss (-1 yard) against the Buffaloes. He had three tackles in the Holiday Bowl vs. Texas. Owusu had 1.5 sacks (-4 yards) against Presbyterian. His other pass breakup came in season-opener vs. Fresno State, while quarterback hurry came against USC. Owusu posted two tackles at Stanford. He had single tackles vs. Fresno State, at UCLA, vs. Washington State, and at Arizona State. Owusu picked up first-team ESPN All-District® 8 for the second consecutive year and first-team Pac-12 All-Academic honors for the first time. He earned the team's Dink Artal Award on the defensive side of the ball for the player best exemplifying Cal spirit. Owusu earned a spot on Phil Steele's midseason third-team All-Pac-12 squad.

=== College statistics ===
Year	Team	G	GS	Tackles			Sacks		Pass Breakups	Forced Fumbles
Year	Team	G	GS	Total	For Loss	Yards	Total	Yards	Pass Breakups	Forced Fumbles
2008	Cal	5	0	5	1	-3	0	0	0	0
2009	Cal	12	0	7	3	-13	2	-15	1	0
2010	Cal	14	9	14	1.5	-10	1.5	-9	2	0
2011	Cal	13	9	30	7.5	-30	4.5	-25	2	1
Total		44	18	56	13	-56	8	-49	5	1

== Professional career ==
=== 2012 NFL draft ===
Pre-draft measurables
Height	Weight	Arm length	Hand span	40-yard dash	10-yard split	20-yard split	20-yard shuttle	Three-cone drill	Vertical jump	Broad jump	Bench press	Wonderlic
6 ft 5 in (1.96 m)	277 lb (126 kg)	33 in (0.84 m)	10 in (0.25 m)	4.70 s	1.70 s	2.70 s	4.5 s	7.19 s	31 in (0.79 m)	9 ft 4 in (2.84 m)	39 reps	x

=== Minnesota Vikings ===
On May 1, 2012, Owusu was signed as an undrafted free agent by the Minnesota Vikings. On November 12, 2012, he was released by the Vikings.

=== Tampa Bay Buccaneers ===
On November 13, 2012, Owusu was signed to the Tampa Bay Buccaneers's practice squad. On August 26, 2013, he was waived by the Buccaneers.

=== San Jose SaberCats ===
On June 4, 2014, Owusu was assigned to the San Jose SaberCats of the Arena Football League (AFL).

=== Edmonton Eskimos ===
On June 6, 2014, Owusu agreed to terms Edmonton Eskimos of the Canadian Football League (CFL).

=== Las Vegas Outlaws ===
On December 22, 2014, Owusu was drafted by the Las Vegas Outlaws with the 2nd overall pick in the 2014 Expansion Draft.
