= 2009 Washington State Cougars football team =

American college football season

2009 Washington State Cougars football
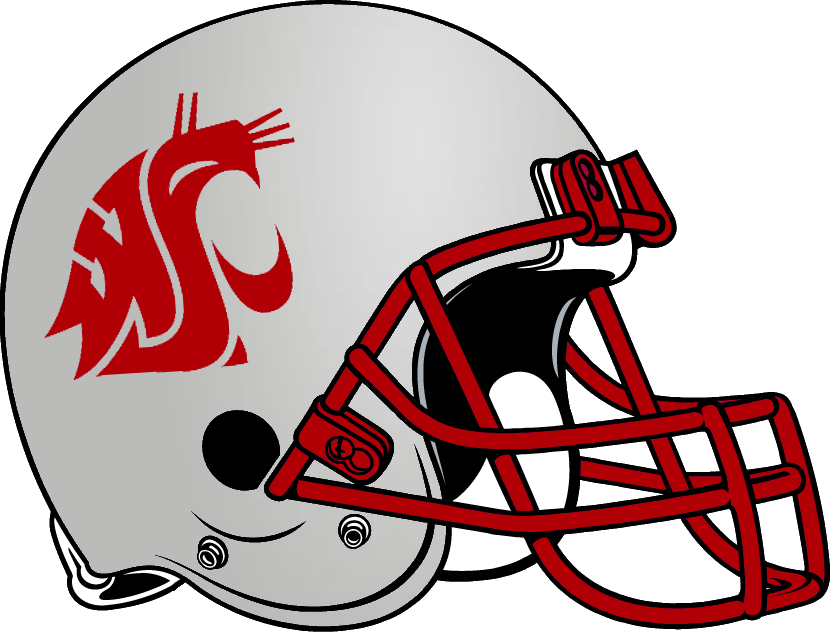
- Conference: Pacific-10 Conference
- Record: 1–11 (0–9 Pac-10)
- Head coach: Paul Wulff (2nd season)
- Offensive coordinator: Todd Sturdy (2nd season)
- Offensive scheme: Spread
- Co-defensive coordinators: Chris Ball (2nd season); Jody Sears (2nd season)
- Base defense: Multiple
- Home stadium: Martin Stadium (Capacity: 35,117)

Uniform

2009 Pacific-10 Conference football standings
	Conf.			Overall
Team	W		L	W		L
No. 11 Oregon $	8	–	1	10	–	3
Arizona	6	–	3	8	–	5
Oregon State	6	–	3	8	–	5
Stanford	6	–	3	8	–	5
No. 22 USC	5	–	4	9	–	4
California	5	–	4	8	–	5
Washington	4	–	5	5	–	7
UCLA	3	–	6	7	–	6
Arizona State	2	–	7	4	–	8
Washington State	0	–	9	1	–	11
$ – BCS representative as conference champion; Rankings from AP Poll

The 2009 Washington State Cougars football team represented Washington State University in the 2009 NCAA Division I FBS football season. Head coach Paul Wulff was in his second season, and the team played its home games on campus at Martin Stadium in Pullman, Washington. The Cougars finished the season with a record of 1–11 (0–9 Pac-10).

== Schedule ==
Date	Time	Opponent	Site	TV	Result	Attendance	Source
September 5	3:00 p.m.	Stanford	Martin Stadium; Pullman, WA	FSNNW	L 13–39	22,386	
September 12	4:00 p.m.	vs. Hawaii*	Qwest Field; Seattle, WA (Cougar Gridiron Classic)		L 20–38	42,912	
September 19	2:00 p.m.	SMU*	Martin Stadium; Pullman, WA		W 30–27 ^{OT}	22,319	
September 26	7:15 p.m.	at No. 10 USC	Los Angeles Memorial Coliseum; Los Angeles, CA	FSN	L 6–27	75,216	
October 3	6:15 p.m.	at No. 25 Oregon	Autzen Stadium; Eugene, OR	CSNNW	L 6–52	57,378	
October 10	2:00 p.m.	Arizona State^{†}	Martin Stadium; Pullman, WA		L 14–27	26,010	
October 24	1:30 pm	at California	California Memorial Stadium; Berkeley, CA		L 17–49	54,738	
October 31	4:30 p.m.	vs. No. 23 Notre Dame*	Alamodome; San Antonio, TX	NBC	L 14–40	53,407	
November 7	12:30 p.m.	at No. 18 Arizona	Arizona Stadium; Tucson, AZ	FCS	L 7–48	50,242	
November 14	2:00 p.m.	UCLA	Martin Stadium; Pullman, WA	FCS	L 7–43	25,661	
November 21	2:00 p.m.	No. 19 Oregon State	Martin Stadium; Pullman, WA		L 10–42	16,167	
November 28	3:30 p.m.	at Washington	Husky Stadium; Seattle, WA (Apple Cup)	FSNNW	L 0–30	68,697	
*Non-conference game; ^{†}Homecoming; Rankings from AP Poll and BCS Rankings after October 18 released prior to game; All times are in Pacific time

== Game summaries ==
=== Stanford ===
	1	2	3	4	Total
Cardinal	8	14	7	10	39
Cougars	0	3	10	0	13

Toby Gerhart rushed for 121 yards and two touchdowns, and redshirt freshman quarterback Andrew Luck made his collegiate debut by throwing for 193 yards and a touchdown pass to Chris Owusu as Stanford defeated Washington State in Pullman. The Cardinal dominated the first half, but as the second half began, the Cougars took the early momentum, driving 80 yards and scoring on a 5-yard pass from Kevin Lopina to Jared Karstetter. However, Owusu answered immediately for the Cardinal with an 85-yard kickoff return for a touchdown to keep the game out of reach.

=== Hawaii ===
	1	2	3	4	Total
Warriors	21	14	0	3	38
Cougars	0	6	7	7	20

=== Southern Methodist ===
	1	2	3	4	OT	Total
Mustangs	7	10	7	3	0	27
Cougars	0	7	6	14	3	30

=== USC ===
	1	2	3	4	Total
Cougars	0	0	0	6	6
Trojans	20	0	0	7	27

=== Oregon ===
	1	2	3	4	Total
Cougars	0	0	6	0	6
Ducks	21	21	3	7	52

=== Arizona State ===
	1	2	3	4	Total
Sun Devils	7	6	6	8	27
Cougars	0	0	7	7	14

=== California ===
	1	2	3	4	Total
Cougars	3	14	0	0	17
Golden Bears	28	7	7	7	49

In the first quarter, passes from Kevin Riley to Jahvid Best and Marvin Jones gave Cal a 14-point lead. Jeremy Ross returned Washington State punter Reid Forrest's 42-yard punt for a 76-yard touchdown. After Nico Grasu kicked a 24-yard field goal to put the Cougars on the scoreboard, Riley completed another pass for Cal for another touchdown, this time to Shane Vereen.

Jahvid Best rushed for 61 yards for a touchdown in the second quarter to give the Bears a 32-point lead and again in the third quarter with a 2-yard run. The final Cal score came in the fourth quarter when Vereen rushed for a 7-yard touchdown.

=== Notre Dame ===
	1	2	3	4	Total
Cougars	0	7	0	7	14
Fighting Irish	9	21	3	7	40

Nick Tausch kicked a 29-yard field goal to put Dotre Dame on the scoreboard. Then Jimmy Clausen passed to Duval Kamara for a 7-yard touchdown in the first quarter. In the second quarter, Golden Tate scored on a 16-yard run for a touchdown and Robert Hughes rushed for a 1-yard for another touchdown.

=== Arizona ===
	1	2	3	4	Total
Cougars	0	0	0	7	7
Wildcats	24	10	7	7	48

=== UCLA ===
	1	2	3	4	Total
Bruins	14	12	3	14	43
Cougars	0	0	7	0	7

The Bruins scored on their first offensive play after an interception, a Kevin Prince to Taylor Embree touchdown pass.

=== Oregon State ===
	1	2	3	4	Total
Beavers	14	7	7	14	42
Cougars	3	7	0	0	10

=== Washington ===
	1	2	3	4	Total
Cougars	0	0	0	0	0
Huskies	3	10	7	10	30
