= 2009 Arizona State Sun Devils football team =

American college football season

2009 Arizona State Sun Devils football
- Conference: Pacific-10 Conference
- Record: 4–8 (2–7 Pac-10)
- Head coach: Dennis Erickson (3rd season)
- Offensive coordinator: Rich Olson (3rd season)
- Offensive scheme: Spread
- Defensive coordinator: Craig Bray (3rd season)
- Base defense: 4–3
- Captains: Dexter Davis; Shawn Lauvao; Mike Nixon
- Home stadium: Sun Devil Stadium

Uniform

2009 Pacific-10 Conference football standings
	Conf.			Overall
Team	W		L	W		L
No. 11 Oregon $	8	–	1	10	–	3
Arizona	6	–	3	8	–	5
Oregon State	6	–	3	8	–	5
Stanford	6	–	3	8	–	5
No. 22 USC	5	–	4	9	–	4
California	5	–	4	8	–	5
Washington	4	–	5	5	–	7
UCLA	3	–	6	7	–	6
Arizona State	2	–	7	4	–	8
Washington State	0	–	9	1	–	11
$ – BCS representative as conference champion; Rankings from AP Poll

The 2009 Arizona State Sun Devils football team represented Arizona State University during the 2009 NCAA Division I FBS football season. The Sun Devils were coached by third-year coach Dennis Erickson and played their home games at Sun Devil Stadium in Tempe, Arizona. The Sun Devils finished the season 4–8 (2–7 Pac-10).

== Schedule ==
Date	Time	Opponent	Site	TV	Result	Attendance
September 5	7:00 pm	Idaho State*	Sun Devil Stadium; Tempe, Arizona	FSAZ	W 50–3	42,588
September 19	7:00 pm	Louisiana-Monroe*	Sun Devil Stadium; Tempe, Arizona	FSAZ	W 38–14	43,780
September 26	4:00 pm	at No. 21 Georgia*	Sanford Stadium; Athens, Georgia	ESPNU	L 17–20	92,746
October 3	4:00 pm	Oregon State	Sun Devil Stadium; Tempe, Arizona	Versus	L 17–28	45,373
October 10	2:00 pm	at Washington State	Martin Stadium; Pullman, Washington		W 27–14	26,010
October 17	7:15 pm	Washington	Sun Devil Stadium; Tempe, Arizona	FSN	W 24–17	53,219
October 24	7:15 pm	at Stanford	Stanford Stadium; Stanford, California	FSN	L 14–33	33,090
October 31	12:30 pm	No. 24 California^{†}	Sun Devil Stadium; Tempe, Arizona	ABC	L 21–23	43,659
November 7	5:00 pm	No. 12 USC	Sun Devil Stadium; Tempe, Arizona	ABC	L 9–14	55,282
November 14	8:20 pm	at No. 13 Oregon	Autzen Stadium; Eugene, Oregon	ESPN	L 21–44	58,475
November 21	2:00 pm	at UCLA	Rose Bowl; Pasadena, California	FSN	L 13–23	46,151
November 28	1:30 pm	Arizona	Sun Devil Stadium; Tempe, Arizona (Territorial Cup)	ABC	L 17–20	55,989
*Non-conference game; ^{†}Homecoming; Rankings from AP Poll and BCS Rankings after October 18 released prior to game; All times are in Mountain time

== Game summaries ==
=== Idaho State ===
	1	2	3	4	Total
Idaho State	0	0	3	0	3
ASU	3	20	13	14	50

at Sun Devil Stadium, Tempe, Arizona Broadcast: FSN Arizona.

Junior placekicker Thomas Weber ties school record for 5 made field goals in a game and Senior Linebacker Mike Nixon earned Pac-10 Conference Defensive Player of Week for his 3 interceptions one of which returned for a touchdown and blocked punt.

=== Louisiana-Monroe ===
	1	2	3	4	Total
Louisiana-Monroe	0	7	0	7	14
ASU	14	10	14	0	38

at Sun Devil Stadium, Tempe, Arizona Broadcast: FSN Arizona.

=== Georgia ===
	1	2	3	4	Total
ASU	3	0	14	0	17
Georgia	14	0	0	6	20

at Sanford Stadium, Athens, Georgia Broadcast: ESPNU

=== Oregon State ===
	1	2	3	4	Total
Beavers	14	7	0	7	28
ASU	3	0	7	7	17

at Sun Devil Stadium, Tempe, Arizona Broadcast: Versus

=== Washington State ===
	1	2	3	4	Total
ASU	7	6	6	8	27
Cougars	0	0	7	7	14

at Martin Stadium, Pullman, Washington

=== Washington ===
Broadcast: FSN

	1	2	3	4	Total
Washington	7	0	7	3	17
ASU	7	7	3	7	24

at Sun Devil Stadium, Tempe, Arizona

Though it appeared the game would be heading into overtime, ASU quarterback Danny Sullivan threw a 50-yard touchdown pass to receiver Chris McGaha in the last five seconds of the game to give ASU the win.

=== Stanford ===
	1	2	3	4	Total
ASU	0	0	7	7	14
Cardinal	10	14	0	9	33

at Stanford Stadium, Stanford, California Broadcast: FSN

=== California ===
	1	2	3	4	Total
Cal	14	3	3	3	23
ASU	0	14	0	7	21

at Sun Devil Stadium, Tempe, Arizona

Both teams were 2-2 in the conference. The Bears fumbled in their first possession, but scored in the second possession on a Kevin Riley pass to Jahvid Best for 11 yards for a touchdown. Another touchdown pass, from Riley to Marvin Jones, gave Cal a 14-0 lead in the first quarter. For the Sun Devils, Samson Szakacsy, in his first collegiate snap, completed a touchdown pass to Jovon Williams (3 yards) and Danny Sullivan passed to Kyle Williams (80 yards) for touchdowns to tie the game in the second quarter. Then Giorgio Tavecchio kicked a 25-yard field goal for Cal before the half.

In the third quarter, Giorgio Tavecchio kicked a 51-yard field goal to increase Cal's lead to 6. But Arizona State answered in the fourth quarter with a Cameron Marshall rush touchdown for 6 yards. Giorgio Tavecchio missed a 39-yard field goal with 5:46 left in the game, but kicked a 24-yard field goal to win the game.

=== USC ===
	1	2	3	4	Total
USC	0	7	7	0	14
ASU	0	3	6	0	9

at Sun Devil Stadium, Tempe, Arizona

=== Oregon ===
	1	2	3	4	Total
ASU	0	7	14	0	21
Oregon	14	17	7	6	44

at Autzen Stadium, Eugene, Oregon

=== UCLA ===
	1	2	3	4	Total
ASU	7	0	0	6	13
UCLA	7	13	0	3	23

at Rose Bowl Stadium, Pasadena, California

=== Arizona ===
	1	2	3	4	Total
Arizona	7	7	0	6	20
ASU	0	0	3	14	17

at Sun Devil Stadium, Tempe, Arizona
