= 2009 Stanford Cardinal football team =

American college football season

2009 Stanford Cardinal football

Sun Bowl, L 27–31 vs. Oklahoma
- Conference: Pacific-10 Conference
- Record: 8–5 (6–3 Pac-10)
- Head coach: Jim Harbaugh (3rd season)
- Offensive coordinator: David Shaw (3rd season)
- Offensive scheme: Pro-style
- Co-defensive coordinators: Andy Buh (2nd season); Ron Lynn (2nd season)
- Base defense: 4–3
- Home stadium: Stanford Stadium

Uniform

2009 Pacific-10 Conference football standings
	Conf.			Overall
Team	W		L	W		L
No. 11 Oregon $	8	–	1	10	–	3
Arizona	6	–	3	8	–	5
Oregon State	6	–	3	8	–	5
Stanford	6	–	3	8	–	5
No. 22 USC	5	–	4	9	–	4
California	5	–	4	8	–	5
Washington	4	–	5	5	–	7
UCLA	3	–	6	7	–	6
Arizona State	2	–	7	4	–	8
Washington State	0	–	9	1	–	11
$ – BCS representative as conference champion; Rankings from AP Poll

The 2009 Stanford Cardinal football team represented Stanford University during the 2009 NCAA Division I FBS football season. The Cardinal was led by third-year head coach Jim Harbaugh and played their home games at Stanford Stadium in Stanford, California.

== Recruiting ==
Stanford's 2009 recruiting class was ranked 15th in the nation by Scout.com and 20th by Rivals.com, and included these top-rated recruits:

Name	Position	Hometown
Usua Amanam	RB	San Jose, California
Zach Ertz	TE	Danville, California
Tyler Gaffney	RB	San Diego, California
Josh Nunes	QB	Upland, California
Jamal-Rashad Patterson	WR	McDonough, Georgia
Jemari Roberts	WR	Long Beach, California
Shayne Skov	LB	Pawling, New York
Terrence Stephens	DT	Gaithersburg, Maryland
Stepfan Taylor	RB	Mansfield, Texas
Levine Toilolo	TE	San Diego, California

== Schedule ==
Date	Time	Opponent	Rank	Site	TV	Result	Attendance
September 5	5:00 p.m.	at Washington State		Martin Stadium; Pullman, WA		W 39–13	22,386
September 12	9:00 a.m.	at Wake Forest*		BB&T Field; Winston-Salem, NC	Raycom	L 17–24	30,002
September 19	6:00 p.m.	San Jose State*		Stanford Stadium; Stanford, CA (Bill Walsh Legacy Game)		W 42–17	33,560
September 26	6:00 p.m.	No. 24 Washington		Stanford Stadium; Stanford, CA	FCS	W 34–14	36,930
October 3	12:30 p.m.	UCLA		Stanford Stadium; Stanford, CA (rivalry)	ABC	W 24–16	41,525
October 10	4:00 p.m.	at Oregon State		Reser Stadium; Corvallis, OR	FSN	L 28–38	41,979
October 17	4:30 p.m.	at Arizona		Arizona Stadium; Tucson, AZ	Versus	L 38–43	53,479
October 24	7:15 p.m.	Arizona State^{†}		Stanford Stadium; Stanford, CA	FSN	W 33–14	33,090
November 7	12:30 p.m.	No. 8 Oregon		Stanford Stadium; Stanford, CA (rivalry)	FSN	W 51–42	43,924
November 14	12:30 p.m.	at No. 9 USC		Los Angeles Memorial Coliseum; Los Angeles, CA (rivalry)	FSN	W 55–21	90,071
November 21	4:30 p.m.	No. 25 California	No. 17	Stanford Stadium; Stanford, CA (112th Big Game)	Versus	L 28–34	50,510
November 28	5:00 p.m.	Notre Dame*		Stanford Stadium; Stanford, CA (Legends Trophy)	ABC/ESPN2	W 45–38	50,510
December 31	11:00 a.m.	vs. Oklahoma*	No. 21	Sun Bowl Stadium; El Paso, TX (Sun Bowl)	CBS	L 27–31	53,713
*Non-conference game; ^{†}Homecoming; Rankings from AP Poll and BCS Rankings after October 18 released prior to game; All times are in Pacific time

== Game summaries ==
=== Washington State ===
	1	2	3	4	Total
Cardinal	8	14	7	10	39
Cougars	0	3	10	0	13

Toby Gerhart rushed for 121 yards and two touchdowns, and redshirt freshman quarterback Andrew Luck made his collegiate debut by throwing for 193 yards and a touchdown pass to Chris Owusu as Stanford defeated Washington State in Pullman. The Cardinal dominated the first half, but as the second half began, the Cougars took the early momentum, driving 80 yards and scoring on a 5-yard pass from Kevin Lopina to Jared Karstetter. However, Owusu answered immediately for the Cardinal with an 85-yard kickoff return for a touchdown to keep the game out of reach.

=== Wake Forest ===
	1	2	3	4	Total
Cardinal	7	10	0	0	17
Demon Deacons	3	0	7	14	24

Stanford quarterback Andrew Luck threw two first half touchdown passes to Ryan Whalen, and Nate Whitaker added a 54-yard field goal—the longest Stanford field goal in 20 years—to give the Cardinal a 17–3 lead at the half. But the Demon Deacons dominated the second half with three unanswered touchdowns: a 3-yard run from Mike Rinfrette, a 9-yard pass from quarterback Riley Skinner to Jordan Williams, and then, with 2 seconds left in the game, a one-yard keeper by Skinner to give Wake Forest its first lead in the game and the 24–17 victory.

=== San Jose State ===
	1	2	3	4	Total
Spartans	0	7	3	7	17
Cardinal	14	7	21	0	42

Stanford's Chris Owusu returned the opening kickoff 94 yards for a touchdown to set the pace as Stanford routed San Jose State 42–17. Owusu also caught a touchdown pass from Andrew Luck, and Toby Gerhart rushed for two touchdowns. The Cardinal added another special teams touchdown on Richard Sherman's 48-yard punt return, and Corey Gatewood rounded out the scoring with a 23-yard interception return for a touchdown. The Spartans scored on a 1-yard pass from Jordan La Secla to Jalal Beauchman, a 14-yard run from Lamon Muldrow, and a 30-yard field goal by Tyler Cope.

=== Washington ===
	1	2	3	4	Total
#24 Huskies	7	7	0	0	14
Cardinal	14	10	3	7	34

The Cardinal rushed for 322 yards, including a career-best 200 yards from Toby Gerhart to down the Huskies. For the second week in a row, Chris Owusu returned the opening kickoff for a touchdown to start the scoring for Stanford. Soon after, the Huskies tied the score on a dropped lateral from Stanford quarterback Andrew Luck to tight end Jim Dray; neither Luck nor Dray realized the throw was not a forward pass, but Washington's Justin Glenn picked up the ball and ran it 51 yards for the touchdown. However, on the next play from scrimmage, Gerhart ran 60 yards for a score to put Stanford ahead to stay.

=== UCLA ===
	1	2	3	4	Total
Bruins	3	3	0	10	16
Cardinal	7	7	10	0	24

Coming into the game, the Bruins were the only undefeated team in the Pac-10 Conference although they had yet to a play another Pac-10 team. Toby Gerhart, the Cardinal's 237-pound tailback who had 138 yards against UCLA last year, is averaging 129 yards a game.

After UCLA recovered a fumble, Kai Forbath kicked a 29-yard field goal to give the Bruins the early lead. Gerhart rushed 5 yards for a touchdown for Stanford in the first quarter and aided by a UCLA penalty in the second quarter, scored a second touchdown. The Bruins kicked a field goal before halftime, aided by a partially blocked punt.

With a 46-yard flea flicker in the third quarter to put Stanford in the red zone, Gerhart scored his third touchdown from the 5-yard line. He finished the game with 134 rushing yards. Later in the quarter, Nate Whitaker kicked a 29-yard field goal to give the Cardinal a 24–6 lead. The Bruins began the fourth quarter with a Johnathan Franklin 1-yard touchdown run to cut the lead to 11, and a Forbath 35-yard field goal with about four minutes left in the game cut the lead to 24–16. UCLA took over with 3 minutes left but was unable to complete the comeback.

=== Oregon State ===
	1	2	3	4	Total
Cardinal	0	7	7	14	28
Beavers	14	17	0	7	38

The Beavers scored on every drive in the first half to take a 31–7 halftime lead on their way to a 38–28 defeat of the Cardinal. Jacquizz Rodgers ran for a career-high 189 yards and a school record-tying four touchdowns. His brother James added the fifth touchdown and a Justin Kahut 31-yard field goal completed the scoring for the Beavers. After falling behind early, Stanford was forced out of its usual Toby Gerhart-led power rushing game, though Gerhart still managed 96 yards and two touchdowns. Andrew Luck added two touchdown passes, one to Chris Owusu and another to Jim Dray.

=== Arizona ===
	1	2	3	4	Total
Cardinal	14	14	10	0	38
Wildcats	13	7	9	14	43

In a game that featured more than a thousand offensive yards, the Wildcats rallied back late to defeat the Cardinal. The quarterbacks were evenly matched: Stanford quarterback Andrew Luck threw for 423 yards and three touchdowns, while Arizona's Nick Foles also tossed three touchdown passes and had a total of 415 yards. Stanford's Toby Gerhart had 123 yards and two touchdowns. Arizona managed a total of just 138 rush yards, but 57 of those came on Nic Grigsby's go-ahead touchdown with under three minutes left. Stanford drove to the Arizona 17 with seconds to play, but a fourth-down pass to Chris Owusu was batted away and the Wildcats escaped with a victory.

=== Arizona State ===
	1	2	3	4	Total
Sun Devils	0	0	7	7	14
Cardinal	10	14	0	9	33

Toby Gerhart rushed for more than 100 yards for the 15th time in his college career as the Cardinal downed the Sun Devils. All four Stanford touchdowns were on rushes, but uncharacteristically for Stanford, only one was by Gerhart. Fullback Owen Marecic, who is almost exclusively used to block for Gerhart, scored on his seventh career carry; freshman Jamal-Rashad Patterson scored on a 22-yard reverse; and backup running back Stepfan Taylor had a 33-yard touchdown run. Arizona State scored on two Danny Sullivan touchdown passes, the last coming just before Sullivan left the game with a bruised knee.

=== Oregon ===
	1	2	3	4	Total
#7 Ducks	7	7	14	14	42
Cardinal	17	14	14	6	51

The Cardinal surprised the Ducks, 51–42, to become bowl-eligible for the first time in eight years. Toby Gerhart ran for three touchdowns and a school-record 223 yards on 38 carries, breaking the previous record of 220 set by Jon Volpe in 1988. He also broke his single-season rushing record set last year with 1,217 yards. Andrew Luck finished 12 for 20 for 251 yards, throwing an 8-yard touchdown pass to Jim Dray in the second quarter and a 31-yarder to Chris Owusu after Oregon cut the Cardinal lead to 10 points early in the third quarter. Oregon closed within six points late in the fourth quarter following a missed Stanford field goal, but Stanford recovered the ensuing onside kick. A field goal with 11 seconds remaining put the game away.

=== USC ===
	1	2	3	4	Total
#25 Cardinal	14	7	7	27	55
#11 Trojans	0	7	14	0	21

Facing its second top-10 opponent in as many weeks, Stanford won 55–21, handing USC a 34-point loss—its biggest loss of the Pete Carroll era and its biggest loss since 1966. Stanford's 55 points was the highest number of points any team had scored against a USC Trojans football team in the 121-year history of Trojan football. The 55 points included three Toby Gerhart touchdown runs and one by Andrew Luck. Richard Sherman returned an interception of a Matt Barkley fourth-quarter pass to spark a 27-point fourth quarter to put away the Trojans and keep the Cardinal's slim Rose Bowl hopes alive.

This was Stanford's third victory against USC in their last five games against each other at the Coliseum (Stanford winning 2001, 2007, and 2009, with USC winning in 2003 and 2005). USC has defeated every other opponent in the Coliseum since Stanford's September 29, 2001 victory in the Coliseum. It was the first defeat in a November game for the Trojans in Carroll's nine-season tenure. For the first time since Carroll's first season, USC lost more than two games in one season. For the second time in three weekends, Carroll suffered the worst loss of his USC tenure, the other being its game against the Oregon Ducks. This was the largest margin of victory for Stanford in a Stanford-USC game since the two teams' rivalry began in 1918. Harbaugh became only the third coach in college football with a winning record against Carroll, going 2–1 in the three times the two coaches have faced each other.

=== California ===
	1	2	3	4	Total
Golden Bears	3	7	14	10	34
#14 Cardinal	14	0	7	7	28

Both teams faced each other in the 112th Big Game with seven wins each, the first time this had happened since 1991. The Cardinal had scored a combined 106 points in two previous games against higher ranked opponents, with consecutive upsets over Oregon and USC, two teams which had blown out Cal 42–3 and 30–3, respectively. Cal also played its second game without star running back Jahvid Best, again starting backup Shane Vereen.

The Cardinal scored on their first possession when Toby Gerhart broke free on the game's third play for a 61-yard touchdown. After successfully blocking a punt, which gave Stanford field position on the Cal 19-yard line, Gerhart scored again on a 2-yard run. The Bears responded with a scoring drive of their own that resulted in a field goal. In the second quarter, a Cal drive was halted when Richard Sherman intercepted Kevin Riley deep in Stanford territory. The Cardinal were unable to capitalize on the turnover however, and the Bears went on a five-minute scoring drive that saw Vereen score his first touchdown of the game on a 1-yard run with just over a minute left in the quarter to make it 14–10 Stanford at the half.

Cal took its first lead in the third quarter with a 92-yard scoring drive resulting in a 4-yard run by Vereen. Stanford was able to move downfield in turn, but missed a 45-yard field goal. The Bears marched downfield again and scored on a 3-yard run by Vereen. Stanford responded on the ensuing possession by scoring on a 1-yard run by Gerhart. The Bears in turn scored in the beginning of the fourth quarter with a 12-yard pass from Riley to Marvin Jones. Midway through the quarter, the Cardinal put together an 87-yard touchdown drive which resulted in Gerhart getting his fourth score of the game on a 5-yard run. After getting the ball back with just under 4 minutes left in the game, Stanford attempted a fourth down conversion which failed. The Bears took possession on the Stanford 23-yard line, but ended up settling for a field goal, making the score 34–28 and giving the Cardinal a chance to win with more than two and a half minutes left if they could score a touchdown. Stanford started out with good field position at its 42-yard line and was able to drive down to the Cal 13-yard line. Cal linebacker Mike Mohammed saved the game for the Bears when he intercepted Cardinal quarterback Andrew Luck, allowing Riley to take three straight knees and Cal to retain the Stanford Axe.

The loss, as well as a double overtime win later in the day by Oregon over Arizona, eliminated Stanford from Rose Bowl contention and the possibility of sharing the Pac-10 conference title. Luck threw for 157 yards, while Gerhart rushed for 136 yards and all of Stanford's four touchdowns, tying a single Big Game record previously set by Cal players Chuck Muncie and Lindsey Chapman. Cal's victory marked the 100th coached by Jeff Tedford, matching Pappy Waldorf for the most wins at Cal in the modern era, with 67. Riley threw for 235 yards and a score, while Vereen had another career game, rushing for 193 yards on 42 carries with three scores.

=== Notre Dame ===
	1	2	3	4	Total
Fighting Irish	14	10	7	7	38
Cardinal	10	10	7	18	45

In a nationally televised game, the Cardinal scored a last-minute touchdown to defeat the Fighting Irish 45–38. Cardinal running back Toby Gerhart made a strong statement for Heisman Trophy consideration, rushing for 205 yards and three touchdowns and throwing his first career touchdown pass to Ryan Whalen. The win was Stanford's first in the annual series since 2001. Notre Dame lost its sixth of the season, all six of which have been by a touchdown or less. Notre Dame quarterback Jimmy Clausen threw for 340 yards and five touchdowns, three to Golden Tate and two to Michael Floyd. The game was Charlie Weis's final game as head coach of Notre Dame; he was fired the following Monday.

=== Oklahoma (Sun Bowl) ===
	1	2	3	4	Total
Sooners	10	7	14	0	31
#19 Cardinal	7	17	0	3	27

Stanford made its first bowl appearance since 2001 without starting quarterback Andrew Luck, who was sidelined due to a broken finger. Tavita Pritchard, who hadn't started a game at quarterback since the 2008 season, played the entire game, and was 8 for 19 with two interceptions as the Sooners outlasted the Cardinal 31–27. Toby Gerhart, who had finished second in the closest Heisman Trophy race ever a few weeks earlier, ran for 135 on 32 carries and scored two touchdowns for Stanford. Meanwhile, Sooners wide receiver Ryan Broyles set a Sun Bowl record with three touchdown receptions and was named Sun Bowl MVP. Broyles had 156 yards receiving and set Oklahoma's single-game record with 13 receptions from quarterback Landry Jones, who passed for 418 yards overall.

== Coaches ==
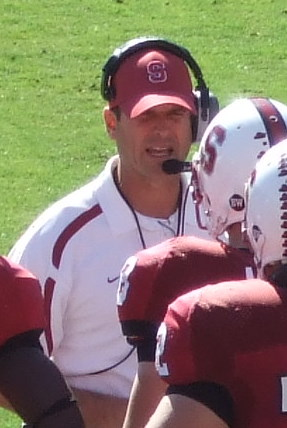
Head Coach Jim Harbaugh

- Jim Harbaugh – Head Coach
- Andy Buh – Co-defensive coordinator/linebackers coach
- Ron Lynn – Co-defensive coordinator/assistant head coach
- David Shaw – Offensive coordinator/wide receivers
- Lance Anderson – Assistant coach – Defensive line
- Tim Drevno – Assistant coach – Offensive line/centers and guards
- D.J. Durkin – Assistant coach – DE/special teams
- Greg Roman – Tight ends/offensive tackles/running game coordinator
- Willie Taggart – Assistant coach – Running backs
- Clayton White – Assistant coach – Defensive backs
- Shannon Turley – Strength and conditioning coordinator
- Matt Doyle – Assistant AD/director of football operations
- Mike Eubanks – Assistant AD/director of football administration
- Dave Forman – Assistant strength and conditioning coach
- Jordan Paopao – Recruiting assistant
- Coleman Hutzler – Defensive analyst

== Rankings ==
Ranking movements Legend: ██ Increase in ranking ██ Decrease in ranking — = Not ranked RV = Received votes
	Week															
Poll	Pre	1	2	3	4	5	6	7	8	9	10	11	12	13	14	Final
AP	—	—	—	—	RV	RV	RV	—	—	—	25	14	RV	23	19	RV
Coaches	—	—	—	—	RV	RV	RV	—	—	—	RV	17	RV	24	21	RV
Harris	Not released				RV	RV	RV	RV	—	RV	RV	17	RV	23	21	Not released
BCS	Not released							—	—	—	—	17	—	24	21	Not released
