= Nyan Boateng =

American football player (born 1987)

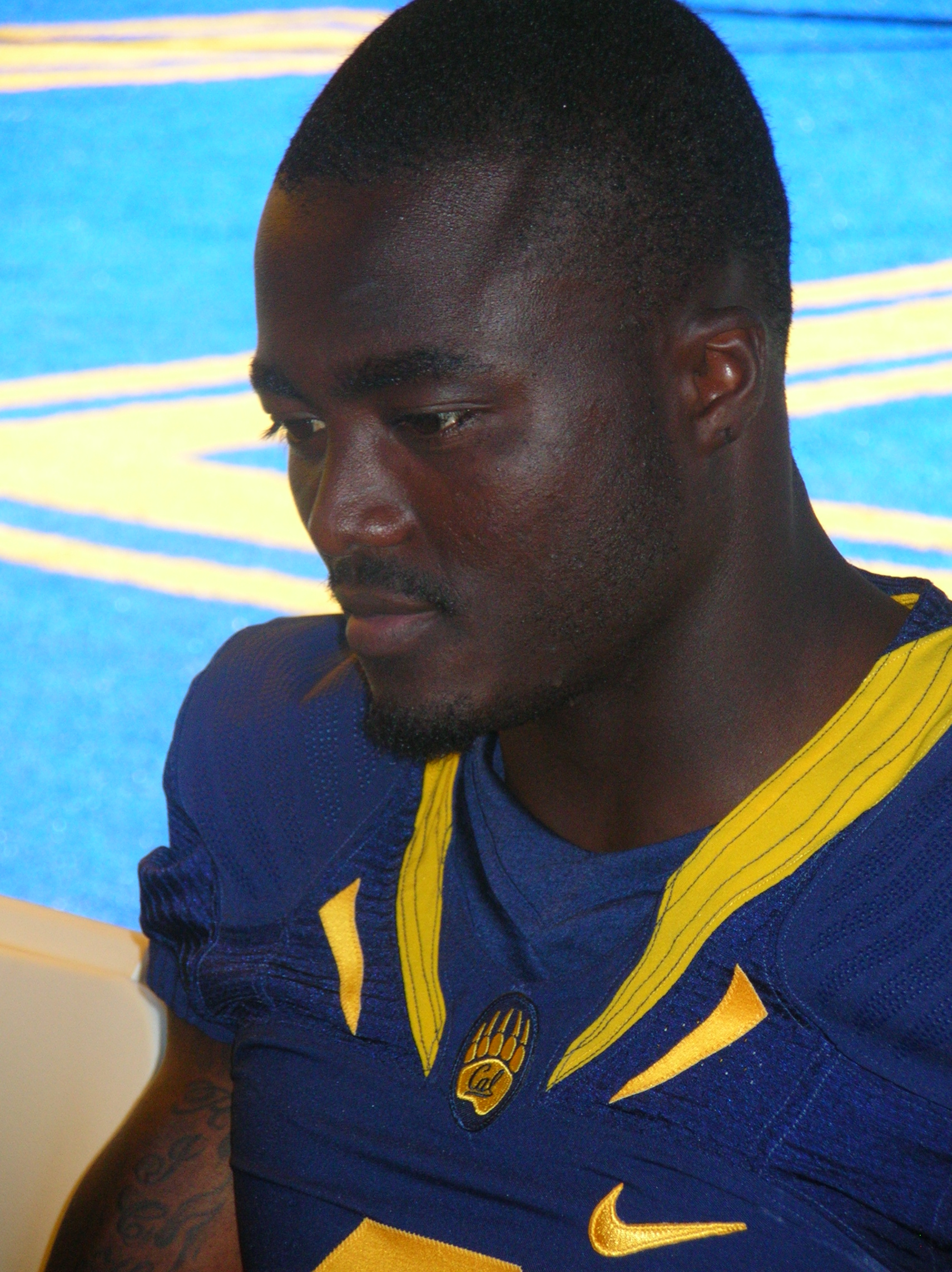
- Boateng at the 2009 Cal Fan Appreciation Day at Memorial Stadium in Berkeley, California

No. 18
- Position: Wide receiver

Personal information
- Born: February 23, 1987 (age 39); Brooklyn, New York, U.S.
- Listed height: 6 ft 2 in (1.88 m)
- Listed weight: 208 lb (94 kg)

Career information
- College: California
- NFL draft: 2009: undrafted

Career history
- New York Giants (2009)*; Chicago Rush (2012)*; Milwaukee Mustangs (2012)*
- * Offseason or practice squad member only

Awards and highlights
- BCS national champion (2007)

Nyan Boateng (born February 23, 1987) is an American former football wide receiver. He was signed by the New York Giants of the National Football League (NFL) as an undrafted free agent in 2009. Boateng played college football for the University of Florida and was a member the 2006 BCS National Championship team. He later transferred to UC Berkeley.

== High school ==
Boateng was born in New York and grew up in Brooklyn. His parents were born in Ghana. As a junior, he led the football team at Abraham Lincoln High School to an undefeated season while playing wide receiver, cornerback, kicker, punter, and punt returner. He also lettered in basketball at Lincoln, where he played with future NBA player Sebastian Telfair and was featured in the documentary film Through the Fire. He was part of three consecutive New York City Public Schools Athletic League basketball championships. Boateng was ranked as the tenth-best shooting guard recruit out of high school by Rivals.com. He suffered a broken ankle in the preseason in August 2004 that forced him to miss his senior season of football. He received an invitation to the U. S. Army All-American Bowl as one of the top wide receivers in the country. Following his senior year of high school, Boateng was ranked by Scout.com as the 38th-best wide receiver prospect in the country, while Rivals.com ranked him 20th.

== College career ==
=== Florida ===
During a high school all-star game, Boateng announced that he chose to go to the University of Florida. Boateng received an athletic scholarship to attend the University of Florida in Gainesville, Florida, where he played wide receiver for coach Urban Meyer's team. Boateng had four catches as a freshman in 2005. He did not play in a game in 2006, and sat out the 2007 season after transferring to California.

=== California ===
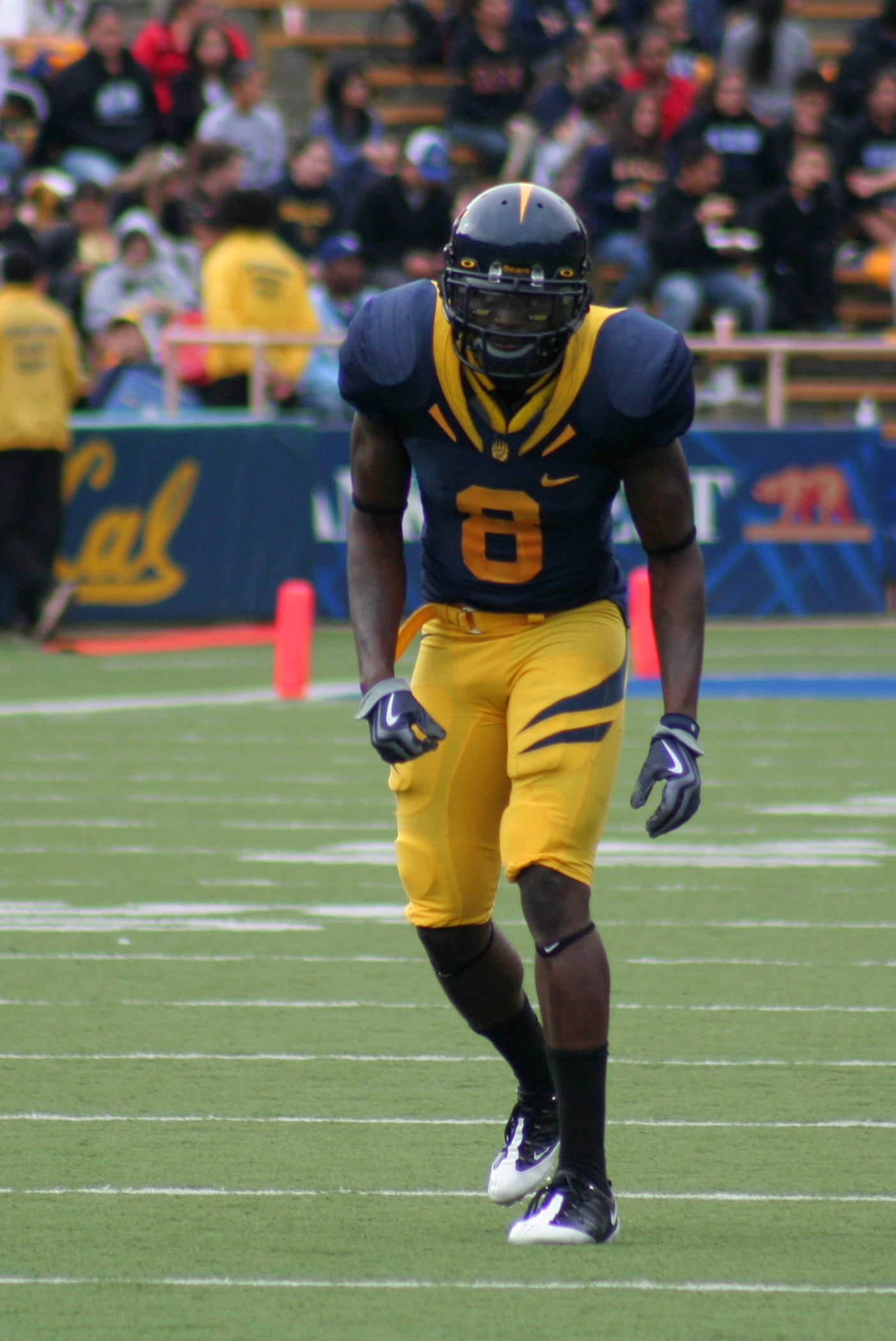
Boateng lines up against Eastern Washington in September 2009.

Toward the end of the 2008 season, even with the team's passing game and struggles on offense, Boateng was becoming a team leader. Boateng caught a 53-yard touchdown pass from Kevin Riley on a flea flicker during a close game early in the fourth quarter in California's 41–20 win over UCLA. Boateng led California in receiving in his first season with 29 catches, 439 receiving yards, and five touchdowns.

Boateng caught his first touchdown pass of the 2009 season in California's home opener against Maryland for 39 yards. In California's first away game of the season against Minnesota on September 19, he fractured his right foot. Boateng had surgery to insert a pin into the foot and missed two games. He registered 13 receptions for 291 yards receiving and two touchdowns in 11 games. He caught a 42-yard touchdown pass in the final game of the season.

== Professional career ==
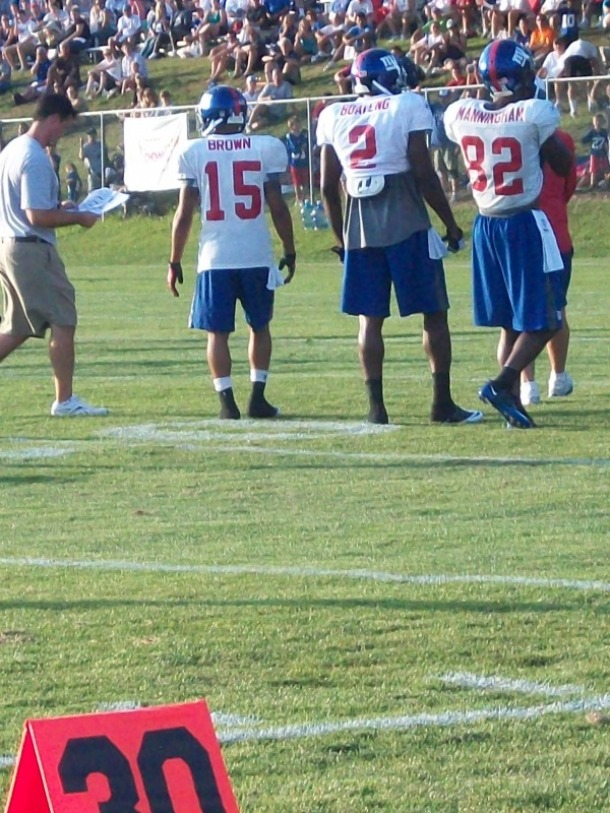
Boateng at New York Giants training camp

Boateng received an invitation to the NFL Scouting Combine after his college career ended. He tried out for the New York Giants in rookie minicamp after going undrafted in the 2010 NFL draft. The Giants signed him to a contract on August 6, 2010. He was waived during the first round of roster cuts on September 1, 2010.

Boateng signed with the Chicago Rush of the Arena Football League on September 30, 2011. He was traded to the Milwaukee Mustangs on February 21, 2012.

== Personal ==
Boateng speaks English, French, and Twi. His older brother, Dominic Osei, played basketball for Fordham University, and his cousin Derek Boateng competed in the FIFA World Cup.

Boateng was charged with participating in an identity theft ring that tried to steal more than US$1 million in March 2019.
