= Trevor Guyton =

American gridiron football player and coach (born 1990)

No. 92
- Position: Defensive tackle

Personal information
- Born: January 9, 1990 (age 36); Philadelphia, Pennsylvania, U.S.
- Listed height: 6 ft 3 in (1.91 m)
- Listed weight: 285 lb (129 kg)

Career information
- High school: Redmond (Redmond, Washington)
- College: California
- NFL draft: 2012: 7th round, 219th overall pick

Career history
- Minnesota Vikings (2012)*; Saskatchewan Roughriders (2014)
- * Offseason or practice squad member only

Awards and highlights
- Second-team All-Pac-12 (2011)
- Stats at Pro Football Reference

Trevor Graves Guyton (born January 9, 1990) is an American former professional football defensive tackle. He was selected by the Minnesota Vikings in the seventh round of the 2012 NFL draft. He played college football at California.

== College career ==
He played at California.

== Professional career ==
=== Minnesota Vikings ===
He was drafted in the seventh round, 219th overall, by the Minnesota Vikings in the 2012 NFL draft. On August 31, 2012, as the Vikings reduced their roster down to league maximum of 53 players, he was released.

=== Saskatchewan Roughriders ===
Guyton signed with the Saskatchewan Roughriders on February 25, 2014.

== Coaching career ==
Guyton currently serves as a defensive graduate assistant at the University of Southern California.

When Guyton moved to Seattle he started coaching high School football.
