= Kevin Riley =

American football player (born 1987)

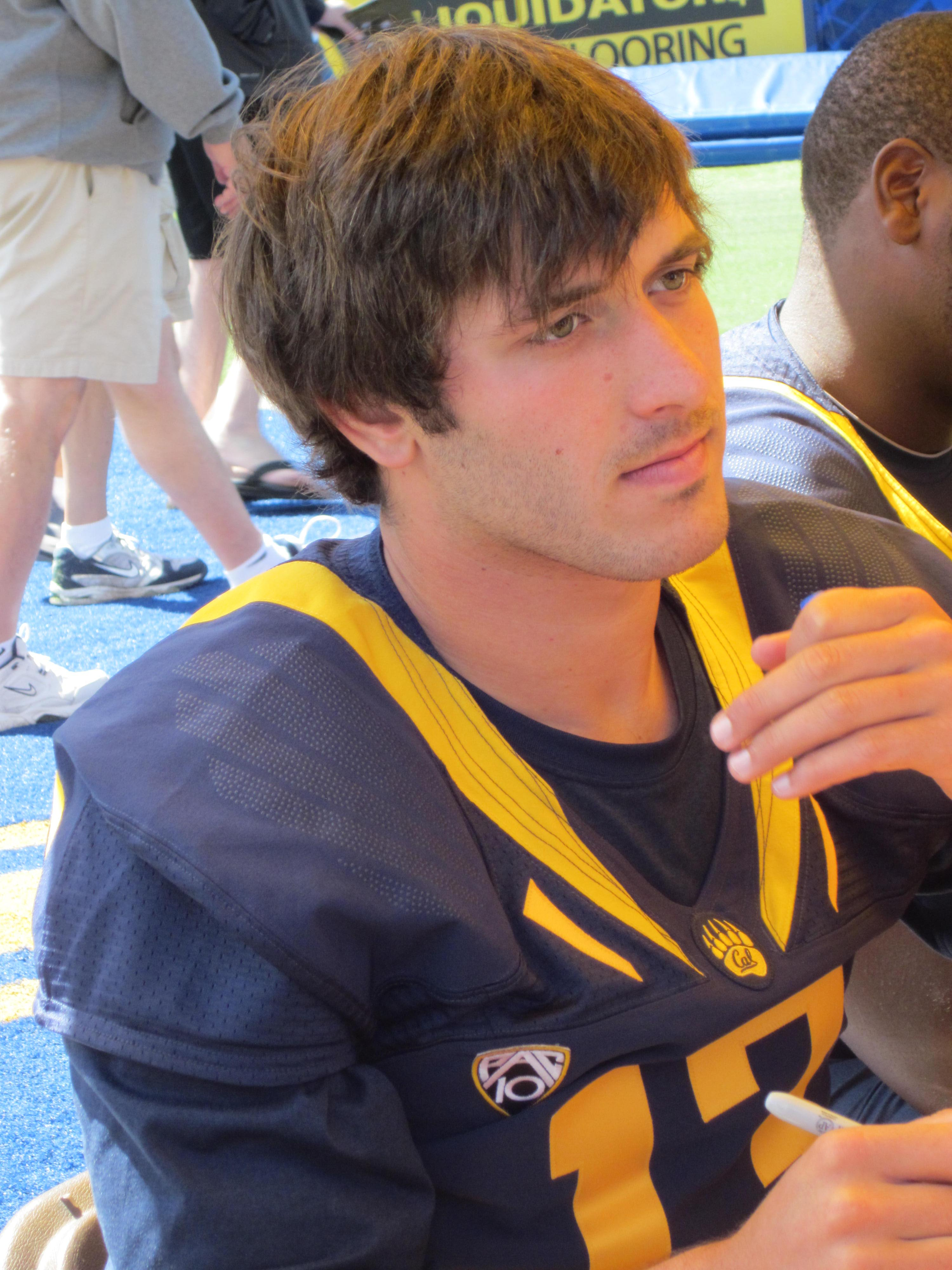
- Riley at 2010 Cal Fan Appreciation Day

No. 13
- Position: Quarterback

Personal information
- Born: January 27, 1987 (age 39); Portland, Oregon, U.S.
- Listed height: 6 ft 3 in (1.91 m)
- Listed weight: 215 lb (98 kg)

Career information
- High school: Beaverton (Beaverton, Oregon)
- College: California (2007–2010)
- NFL draft: 2011: undrafted

Career history
- BC Lions (2011)*
- * Offseason or practice squad member only

Awards and highlights
- 2007 Armed Forces Bowl MVP

Kevin Riley (born January 27, 1987) is an American former college football player who was a quarterback for the California Golden Bears. He played for California from 2007 to 2010.

== Early life ==
Riley was born on January 27, 1987, to parents Faustin and Rhonda Riley in Portland, Oregon. He attended Beaverton High School, where he played football. Riley was considered the top player in Oregon as a senior by Rivals.com and SuperPrep magazine. He was named Portland metro area player of the year after passing for 2,580 yards with just six interceptions on 239 attempts. He was team MVP and vice president of his class as a junior and senior.

== College career ==
=== 2007 ===
Riley made his first career start for the injured Nate Longshore in California's homecoming game against Oregon State. Riley passed for 294 yards, two touchdowns, and rushed for a touchdown but California lost the game when he scrambled instead of throwing the ball away to set up a field goal to tie the game. Riley did get credit for putting Cal in a situation to win after being down 31–21 late in the fourth quarter.

Riley took over for Longshore in the second quarter of the 2007 Armed Forces Bowl. He passed for 269 yard, 3 touchdowns, and rushed for a touchdown, helping the Bears turn a 21–0 deficit into a victory. Riley was the game's MVP.

=== 2008 ===
Riley competed with Longshore for the starting quarterback job, winning the position for the first four games. He led the Bears to wins over Michigan State at home, throwing for 202 yards and two touchdowns. He only played during the first half of the Bears' 66–3 rout of Washington State, which allowed the backup players to get some starting time. The win resulted in the Bears breaking into the Top 25 at #23, but they were upset in College Park, Maryland on September 13 by the unranked Maryland Terrapins. With the Bears' offense stifled by the Terrapins' defense for three quarters, Riley threw three touchdown passes in the fourth quarter for 423 yards on 58 attempts, a school record for the most pass attempts.

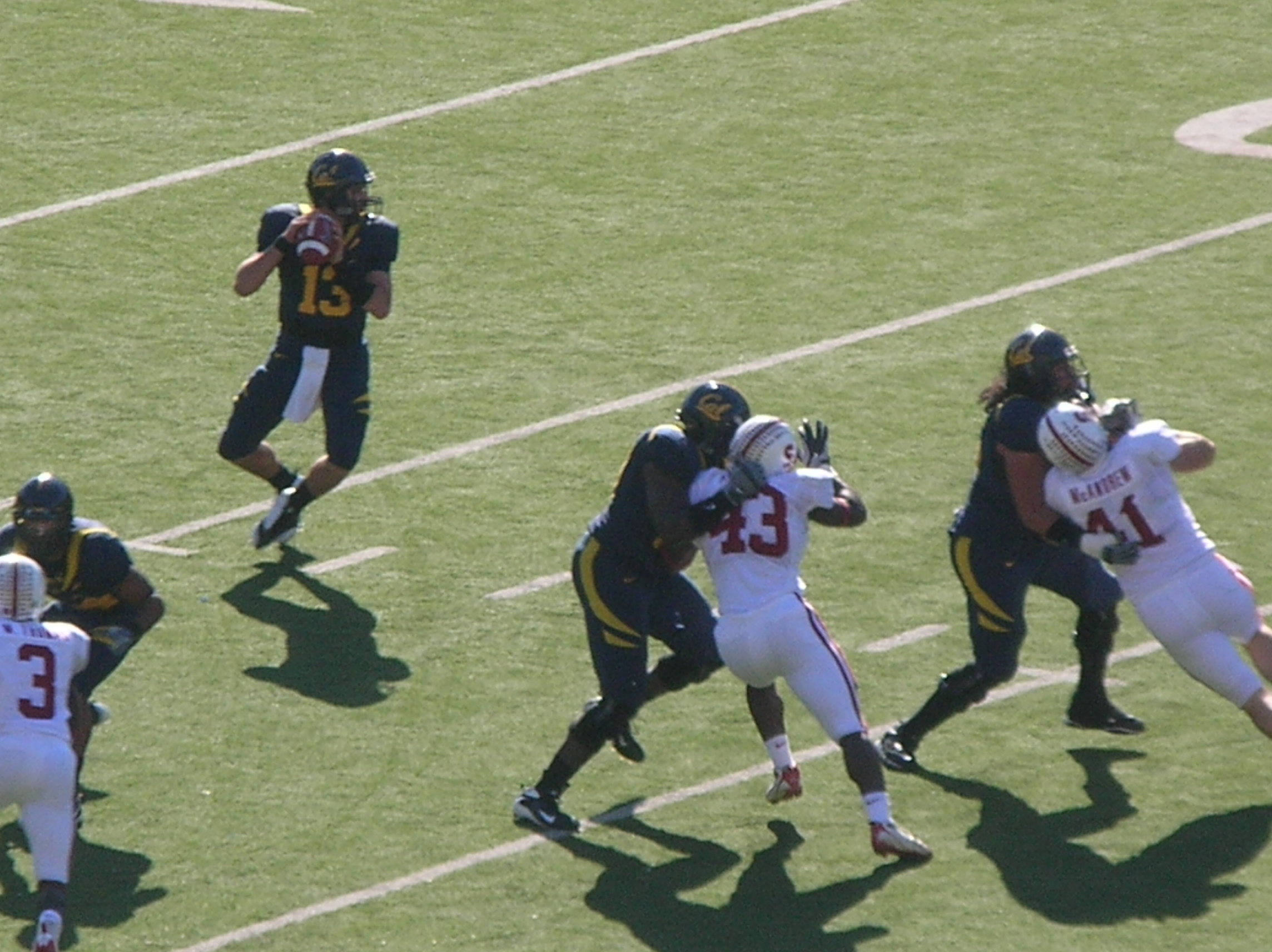
Riley looks to pass during the 2008 Big Game

Two weeks later, he started against Colorado State at home on September 27, during which he threw for 59 yards and one touchdown pass. With Cal up 21–0, Nate Longshore stepped in at quarterback in the third quarter and threw for two touchdowns in the fourth. This resulted in the starting quarterback position being reopened by head coach Jeff Tedford for the following week against Arizona State on October 4. Longshore was picked as the starter and led the Bears to a 24–14 victory. On October 18, Riley stepped in at quarterback in the fourth quarter during an away game against the Arizona Wildcats. He was unable to lead a comeback, throwing for 97 yards and one interception, and the Bears fell to the Wildcats 42–27. Riley got the start the following week against the UCLA Bruins, his first since Colorado State nearly a month prior. He threw for 153 yards and two touchdowns, both in the fourth quarter, in the 41–20 victory.

Riley also got the start the following week against the Oregon Ducks. He sustained a concussion after being hit in the first quarter when he failed to slide while trying to gain a first down and did not return to the game. Longshore stepped in and led the Bears to a 26–16 upset over #23 Oregon. The following week against USC, Riley took over in the second half but was unable to lead the Bears to an upset of the #6 Trojans. Riley got the start the following week against Stanford for the 111th Big Game. He threw for 101 yards, including three touchdown passes, in the Bears' 37–16 victory over the Cardinal and reclaiming of the Stanford Axe. Riley's three start run ended when Longshore was picked over him to start the 2008 Emerald Bowl against the Miami Hurricanes, which the Bears won 24–17. Riley was expected to compete for the starting quarterback position in 2009 with redshirt freshman Brock Mansion.

=== 2009 ===
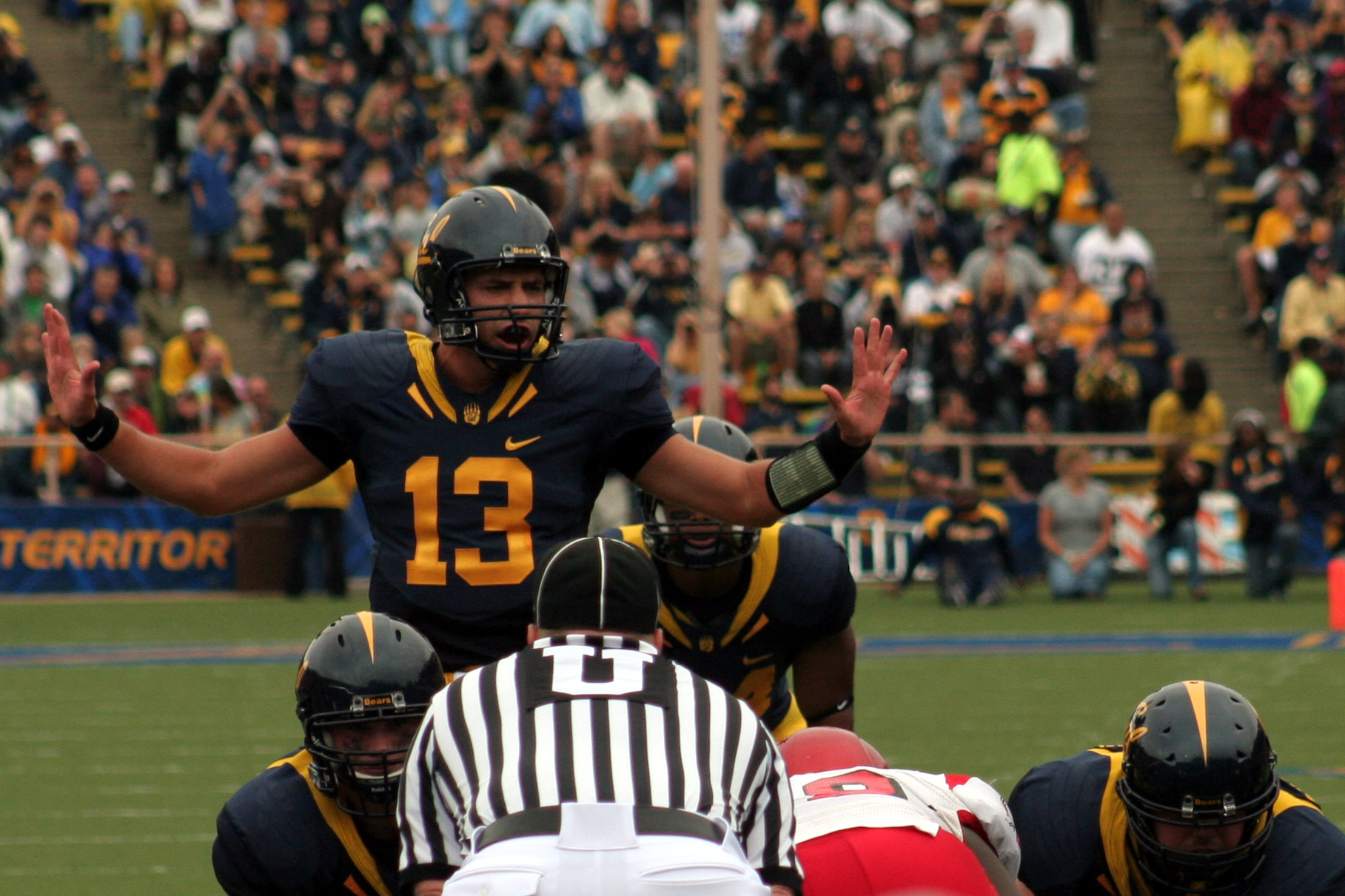
Riley calls out signals at the line of scrimmage against Eastern Washington on September 12

Riley was named the starter for the 2009 season a week before the team's season opener against Maryland, a contrast to 2008 when head coach Jeff Tedford alternated between him and Nate Longshore. On September 5, Riley threw for 298 yards and four touchdowns against the Terrapins, each to a different receiver. The following week against Eastern Washington he threw for 151 yards and a score, also getting his first rushing touchdown of the season. At Cal's first away game on September 19 against Minnesota, he passed for 252 yards. Riley struggled the following week against Oregon, being sacked four times and held to 123 passing yards. Although was replaced in the fourth quarter by Beau Sweeney, the Bears could only muster a field goal to Oregon's 42 points. Riley fared slightly better against USC on October 3, throwing for 198 yards and an interception. However, the Bears were again blown out in a 30–3 loss.

Two weeks later against UCLA, Riley bounced back, leading the Bears to a 45–26 victory in which he threw for 205 yards and three touchdowns. He followed this up with a 229-yard and three touchdown performance against Washington State, the worst team in the conference. Riley played perhaps his best game of the season against Arizona State in Tempe. Cal narrowly defeated the Sun Devils 23–21, with Riley throwing for 351 yards and a pair of touchdowns. On November 7, despite passing for 200 yards and a touchdown, Cal sustained its fifth straight loss to Oregon State. In Cal's final home game against #18 Arizona, the Bears upset the Wildcats 24–16. Riley threw for 181 yards and a touchdown, being intercepted twice. Cal entered the Big Game against Stanford as the underdog on November 21, hanging on to pull off a 34–28 upset in which Riley threw for 235 yards and a touchdown. The regular season ended for Riley on a sour note, with an upset by Washington in which he was sacked five times, despite throwing for a score and 215 yards. Against Utah in the Poinsettia Bowl, Riley passed for 214 yards in the 37–27 loss. He accounted for all three of Cal's turnovers and was sacked four times.

=== 2010 ===
Riley entered the 2010 season as the Pac-10 Conference leader in wins and touchdown passes. He was named to the watch list for the Manning Award on July 22. Despite an inconsistent performance in 2009, he retained the starting quarterback job. In the season opener against UC Davis on September 4, Riley threw for 258 yards and three touchdowns, following this up with 197 yards and four scores, all to different receivers, the following week against Colorado. On September 17 he had 277 yards, a touchdown and three interceptions in a loss to Nevada in Reno, while throwing for 116 yards and an interception in a narrow loss to Arizona on September 25. On October 9 against UCLA, he threw for 83 yards and a touchdown, while scoring himself on a rushing touchdown.

Riley sustained a season-ending injury to his left knee when he was hit low during an October 30 road game against Oregon State and had to be helped from the field. He did not return to the game. Junior redshirt Brock Mansion was the starter for the remainder of the season.

== Post-college career ==
Riley was invited to participate in the San Francisco 49ers' Local Pro Day in April 2011. He also tried out for the BC Lions of the Canadian Football League. Riley signed with the Lions on May 27, but was later cut by the team on June 5. Riley now works in medical sales in San Francisco.

== Awards and honors ==
- 2007 Armed Forces Bowl MVP
- Named Pac-10 offensive player of the week, September 5, 2009
