= 2008 Oregon Ducks football team =

American college football season

2008 Oregon Ducks football

Holiday Bowl champion

Holiday Bowl, W 42–31 vs. Oklahoma State
- Conference: Pacific-10 Conference

Ranking
- Coaches: No. 9
- AP: No. 10
- Record: 10–3 (7–2 Pac-10)
- Head coach: Mike Bellotti (14th season)
- Offensive coordinator: Chip Kelly (2nd season)
- Offensive scheme: Spread
- Defensive coordinator: Nick Aliotti (12th season)
- Base defense: 4–3
- Captains: Patrick Chung; Jeremiah Johnson; Nick Reed; Max Unger
- Home stadium: Autzen Stadium

Uniform

2008 Pacific-10 Conference football standings
	Conf.			Overall
Team	W		L	W		L
No. 3 USC $	8	–	1	12	–	1
No. 10 Oregon	7	–	2	10	–	3
No. 18 Oregon State	7	–	2	9	–	4
California	6	–	3	9	–	4
Arizona	5	–	4	8	–	5
Arizona State	4	–	5	5	–	7
Stanford	4	–	5	5	–	7
UCLA	3	–	6	4	–	8
Washington State	1	–	8	2	–	11
Washington	0	–	9	0	–	12
$ – Conference champion; Rankings from AP Poll

The 2008 Oregon Ducks football team represented the University of Oregon as a member of the Pacific-10 Conference (Pac-10) during the 2008 NCAA Division I FBS football season. Led by Mike Bellotti in his 14th and final season as head coach, the Ducks compiled an overall record of 10–3 with a mark of 7–2 in conference play, tying for second place in the Pac-10. Oregon was invited to the Holiday Bowl, where the Ducks defeated Oklahoma State, 42–31. The team played home games at Autzen Stadium in Eugene, Oregon.

Bellotti promoted to become the school's athletic director after the season.

== Preseason ==
February 2 – Gary Zimmerman, offensive lineman for the Oregon Ducks from 1980 to 1983, was voted into the Pro Football Hall of Fame in Canton, Ohio. This induction marks the sixth former Oregon player to be selected into the Hall of Fame.

April 4 – Nick Reed named to the Lott Trophy watch list. The trophy is awarded to the best collegiate defensive player each year.

April 18 – Fenuki Tupou and Max Unger named to the Outland Trophy watch list. The trophy is awarded to the best interior lineman each year.

April 27 – In the University of Oregon spring game the white team defeated the green team 36–3. The game featured breakout plays by Justin Roper, Ed Dickson and LeGarrette Blount.

April 30 – In the NFL draft, three players are selected, Jonathan Stewart selected 13th overall to the Carolina Panthers, Dennis Dixon selected in the 5th round by the Pittsburgh Steelers, and Geoff Schwartz also going to the Panthers in the 7th round. Two other players were signed as free agents, Cameron Colvin with the San Francisco 49ers and David Faaeteete with the Chicago Bears.

May 12 – Patrick Chung and Nick Reed named to the Bronko Nagurski Trophy pre-season watch list. The award is given to the best defensive player in college football each year.

May 13 – Max Unger named to the Dave Rimington Trophy pre-season watch list. The award is given to the outstanding NCAA Division I-A offensive center.

June 30 – Jaison Williams was named to the Maxwell Football Club Award watch list. The Maxwell Award is presented to the most outstanding player of the year. Also, Jairus Byrd, Patrick Chung and Walter Thurmond III were named to the Chuck Bednarik Award watch list. The award is given to the best defensive player of the year.

July 7 – Jairus Byrd, Patrick Chung, and Walter Thurmond III named to the Jim Thorpe Award pre-season watch list. The award is given to the best defensive back in college football each year. Oregon is the only school to have more than two nominees.

July 13 – While swimming in the McKenzie River with some of his teammates, redshirt freshman defensive back Todd Doxey drowned. The accident occurred around 3:15 in the afternoon near the Marcola Road Bridge and he was pronounced dead at Sacred Heart Medical Center at 8:06 p.m.

July 26 – Junior linebacker Kevin Garrett was suspended indefinitely for a violation of team rules. Garrett finished the 2007 season with 21 tackles with 5.5 for a loss.

July 31 – Junior Ed Dickson has been named to the John Mackey Award watchlist, Dickson is one of 30 players named. The award is given to the Tight End who better exemplifies play, academics and sportsmanship.

August 18 – Senior Nick Reed has been named to the Walter Camp Football Foundation Player of the Year award list. The Walter Camp Football Foundation has named 35 player for consideration.

August 25 – It was announced by GoDucks.com that sophomore quarterback Nate Costa had re-injured his left knee during a practice on the preceding Wednesday. Current estimates place his recovery at eight to ten weeks, however the status of his ACL and MCL will be determined at the time of his surgery. This news means that redshirt sophomore Justin Roper will more than likely be the starter, and is expected to be challenged by sophomore transfer Jeremiah Masoli.

=== Recruiting class ===
As of July 11, 2008, the University of Oregon had signed four junior college transfers and 16 high school seniors.

College recruiting
Name	Hometown	School	Height	Weight	40^{‡}	Commit date
Justin Thompson; DT	Torrance, California	El Camino CC	6 ft 5 in (1.96 m)	285 lb (129 kg)	5.2	Dec 12, 2007
Justin Thompson; DT	Recruit ratings: Scout: Rivals: (–)					
Chris Harper; ATH	Wichita, Kansas	Northwest HS	6 ft 2 in (1.88 m)	226 lb (103 kg)	4.5	Jan 18, 2008
Chris Harper; ATH	Recruit ratings: Scout: Rivals: (81)					
Darron Thomas; QB	Houston, Texas	Aldine HS	6 ft 4 in (1.93 m)	193 lb (88 kg)	4.5	Dec 13, 2007
Darron Thomas; QB	Recruit ratings: Scout: Rivals: (80)					
Dion Jordan; TE	Chandler, Arizona	Chandler HS	6 ft 6 in (1.98 m)	215 lb (98 kg)	4.6	Jan 9, 2008
Dion Jordan; TE	Recruit ratings: Scout: Rivals: (78)					
LeGarrette Blount; RB	Scooba, Mississippi	East Mississippi CC	6 ft 2 in (1.88 m)	233 lb (106 kg)	4.5	Dec 19, 2007
LeGarrette Blount; RB	Recruit ratings: Scout: Rivals: (–)					
Dewitt Stuckey; OLB	Stockton, California	Lincoln HS	6 ft 0 in (1.83 m)	214 lb (97 kg)	4.6	Nov 29, 2007
Dewitt Stuckey; OLB	Recruit ratings: Scout: Rivals: (77)					
John Boyett; S	Napa, California	Napa HS	6 ft 0 in (1.83 m)	189 lb (86 kg)	NA	Jun 8, 2007
John Boyett; S	Recruit ratings: Scout: Rivals: (72)					
LaMichael James; RB	Texarkana, Texas	Liberty Eylau HS	5 ft 9 in (1.75 m)	185 lb (84 kg)	4.4	Feb 6, 2008
LaMichael James; RB	Recruit ratings: Scout: Rivals: (80)					
Hamani Stevens; C	Hemet, California	Hemet Senior HS	6 ft 3 in (1.91 m)	290 lb (130 kg)	5.3	Feb 6, 2008
Hamani Stevens; C	Recruit ratings: Scout: Rivals: (78)					
Nick Cody; OT	Brush Prairie, Washington	Hockinson HS	6 ft 6 in (1.98 m)	290 lb (130 kg)	5.0	Jul 3, 2007
Nick Cody; OT	Recruit ratings: Scout: Rivals: (77)					
Kenjon Barner; RB	Riverside, California	Notre Dame HS	5 ft 11 in (1.80 m)	170 lb (77 kg)	NA	Oct 31, 2007
Kenjon Barner; RB	Recruit ratings: Scout: Rivals: (79)					
Blake Cantu; WR	Southlake, Texas	Carroll HS	6 ft 1 in (1.85 m)	191 lb (87 kg)	4.5	Jun 27, 2007
Blake Cantu; WR	Recruit ratings: Scout: Rivals: (77)					
Scott Grady; CB	Tigard, Oregon	Tigard HS	5 ft 11 in (1.80 m)	176 lb (80 kg)	4.5	Jun 20, 2007
Scott Grady; CB	Recruit ratings: Scout: Rivals: (75)					
Mychal Rivera; TE	Van Nuys, California	Birmingham Senior HS	6 ft 4 in (1.93 m)	229 lb (104 kg)	4.8	Jun 3, 2007
Mychal Rivera; TE	Recruit ratings: Scout: Rivals: (75)					
Garrett Embry; WR	Roswell, Georgia	Roswell HS	6 ft 2 in (1.88 m)	209 lb (95 kg)	4.7	Sep 3, 2007
Garrett Embry; WR	Recruit ratings: Scout: Rivals: (72)					
Kiko Alonso; MLB	Los Gatos, California	Los Gatos HS	6 ft 3 in (1.91 m)	231 lb (105 kg)	4.8	Oct 9, 2007
Kiko Alonso; MLB	Recruit ratings: Scout: Rivals: (70)					
Blake Ferras; DT	San Francisco, California	CC of San Francisco	6 ft 5 in (1.96 m)	285 lb (129 kg)	4.8	Dec 17, 2007
Blake Ferras; DT	Recruit ratings: Scout: Rivals: (NA)					
Josh Kaddu; OLB	Vacaville, California	Vacaville HS	6 ft 3 in (1.91 m)	210 lb (95 kg)	4.8	Jan 4, 2008
Josh Kaddu; OLB	Recruit ratings: Scout: Rivals: (40)					
Zach Taylor; TE	Brenham, Texas	Blinn College	6 ft 4 in (1.93 m)	223 lb (101 kg)	4.7	Jan 27, 2008
Zach Taylor; TE	Recruit ratings: Scout: Rivals: (–)					
Ellis Krout; WR	Gilroy, California	Gavilan CC	6 ft 4 in (1.93 m)	190 lb (86 kg)	4.5	Feb 6, 2008
Ellis Krout; WR	Recruit ratings: Scout: Rivals: (NA)					
Jeremiah Masoli; QB	San Francisco	CC of San Francisco	6 ft 0 in (1.83 m)	205 lb (93 kg)	4.5	May 1, 2008
Jeremiah Masoli; QB	Recruit ratings: Scout: Rivals: (–)					
Overall recruit ranking: Scout: 23 Rivals: 19
‡ Refers to 40-yard dash; Note: In many cases, Scout, Rivals, 247Sports, On3, and ESPN may conflict in their listings of height, weight and 40 time.; In these cases, the average was taken. ESPN grades are on a 100-point scale.; Sources: "Oregon Football Commitment List 2008". Rivals.; "Oregon College Football Recruiting Commits 2008". Scout.; "Oregon Ducks Commits 2008". ESPN.; "Scout.com Team Recruiting Rankings". Scout.; "2008 Team Ranking". Rivals.com.

== Schedule ==
Date	Time	Opponent	Rank	Site	TV	Result	Attendance
August 30	7:00 pm	Washington	No. 21	Autzen Stadium; Eugene, OR (rivalry)	FSN	W 44–10	58,778
September 6	12:30 pm	Utah State*	No. 18	Autzen Stadium; Eugene, OR	OSN	W 66–24	58,060
September 13	12:30 pm	at Purdue*	No. 16	Ross–Ade Stadium; West Lafayette, IN	ABC/ESPN2	W 32–26 ^{2OT}	54,666
September 20	12:30 pm	Boise State*	No. 17	Autzen Stadium; Eugene, OR	OSN, KTVB	L 32–37	58,713
September 27	3:15 pm	at Washington State		Martin Stadium; Pullman, WA	FSN	W 63–14	30,927
October 4	5:00 pm	at No. 9 USC	No. 23	Los Angeles Memorial Coliseum; Los Angeles, CA (rivalry)	ABC	L 10–44	82,765
October 11	7:15 pm	UCLA^{†}		Autzen Stadium; Eugene, OR	FSN	W 31–24	58,728
October 25	7:05 pm	at Arizona State		Sun Devil Stadium; Tucson, AZ	OSN	W 54–20	69,406
November 1	12:30 pm	at California	No. 23	California Memorial Stadium; Berkeley, CA	ABC	L 16–26	61,432
November 8	12:30 pm	Stanford		Autzen Stadium; Eugene, OR (rivalry)	FSN	W 35–28	58,013
November 15	3:30 pm	Arizona		Autzen Stadium; Eugene, OR	KLSR	W 55–45	58,369
November 29	4:00 pm	at No. 17 Oregon State	No. 23	Reser Stadium; Corvallis, OR (Civil War)	Versus	W 65–38	46,319
December 30	5:00 pm	vs. No. 13 Oklahoma State*	No. 15	Qualcomm Stadium; San Diego, CA (Holiday Bowl)	ESPN	W 42–31	59,106
*Non-conference game; ^{†}Homecoming; Rankings from AP Poll released prior to the game; All times are in Pacific time

== Game summaries ==
=== Washington ===
	1	2	3	4	Total
Huskies	0	10	0	0	10
Ducks	14	0	7	23	44

Oregon won at Washington last year for the first time since 1997 and has won four in a row over the Huskies for the first time since 1931.

Passing Leaders	Rushing Leaders	Receiving Leaders
Jeremiah Masoli: 9/17, 126 Yards, 2 Touchdowns	Jeremiah Johnson: 15 Carries, 124 Yards, 2 Touchdowns	Terence Scott: 6 Receptions, 117 Yards, 1 Touchdown
Justin Roper: 7/11, 114 Yards, 1 Touchdown	Chris Harper: 12 Carries, 60 Yards, 1 Touchdown	Jaison Williams: 4 Receptions, 61 Yards, 1 Touchdown
	Jeremiah Masoli: 4 Carries, 23 Yards	Jeffrey Maehl: 5 Receptions, 49 Yards, 1 Touchdown

Last season it was the Duck offense that led Oregon to a 55–34 win over the Huskies. This year a combination of that same offense and nearly shut-down defense is what earned the 44–10 win against Washington. Huskies quarterback Jake Locker, who had 335 yards of total offense last year, was only able to add 160 total yards for his offense, 103 passing and 57 running.

Although the big story for the Ducks coming into the game was how quarterback Justin Roper would fare after Nate Costa reinjured his left knee in the week of practices leading up to the game. It was discovered just three days before the game that he would miss his second consecutive season after sitting out all of last season. Roper, whose only experience starting an NCAA game was the Sun Bowl last season, did just as well as any could have hoped, leading the Ducks to a 7–0 lead within a minute and a half of the Duck's first possession.

However, during the second quarter, team doctors observed that Roper was showing symptoms of a concussion and was removed from the game. Coach Mike Bellotti then turned the game over to junior college transfer Jeremiah Masoli, who finished the game with 126 yards passing and 2 touchdowns. Coach Belotti has reported that he expects Roper to be 100% for the game against Utah State on September 6.

Notable performances include Masoli's 126 yards of passing and 2 touchdowns on 9 completions, running back Jeremiah Johnson ran for a total of 124 yards and 2 touchdowns on 15 carries and wide receiver Terrence Scott had 117 yards receiving and a touchdown on 6 receptions. This win also marks the first time in the Oregon-Washington series, dating back to 1900, that Oregon has won 5 consecutive games against the Huskies.

=== Utah State ===
Oregon is 3–0 against Utah State with the most recent meeting occurring in 2001.

	1	2	3	4	Total
Aggies	0	14	0	10	24
Ducks	14	24	21	7	66

Passing Leaders	Rushing Leaders	Receiving Leaders
Justin Roper: 13/18, 173 Yards, 1 Touchdown	LeGarrette Blount: 18 Carries, 132 Yards, 2 Touchdowns	Jeffrey Maehl: 4 Receptions, 72 Yards
Jeremiah Masoli: 7/11, 67 Yards	Andre Crenshaw: 10 Carries, 72 Yards, 1 Touchdown	Ed Dickson: 6 Receptions, 70 Yards
Chris Harper: 4/6, 40 Yards, 1 Touchdown	Remene Alston: 10 Carries, 71 Yards, 1 Touchdown	Terrence Scott: 4 Receptions, 44 Yards, 1 Touchdown

There was some speculation heading into the game about the health of Justin Roper. Roper had suffered a concussion during the Washington game and stopped play half way through the second quarter. By halftime there was very little concern of his health as Oregon took a 38–14 lead into the locker room. However during Oregon's first possession, running back Jeremiah Johnson separated his shoulder and Roper threw his second interception of the season. Despite this Roper was able to lead the Ducks to five consecutive scoring drives.

Top performances are: Justin Roper completing 13 of 18 passes for 173 yards and 1 touchdown, LeGarrette Blount rushing 132 yards and 2 touchdowns on 18 carries and Jeffrey Maehl completing 4 receptions for 72 yards. During the game, the Ducks had 688 yards of total offense which set a school record for yards of offense in one game. The previous record was 667 against BYU in 1989.

=== Purdue ===
	1	2	3	4	OT	2OT	Total
Ducks	3	3	14	3	3	6	32
Boilermakers	13	7	0	3	3	0	26

Oregon lost at Purdue 13–7 in their only meeting in 1979. These two teams played again in Eugene during the 2009 season.

Passing Leaders	Rushing Leaders	Receiving Leaders
Justin Roper: 20/48, 197 Yards	LeGarrette Blount: 10 Carries, 132 Yards, 2 Touchdowns	Ed Dickson: 7 Receptions, 93 Yards
	Jeremiah Johnson: 17 Carries, 96 Yards	Jaison Williams: 5 Receptions, 49 Yards
	Justin Roper: 6 Carries, 40 Yards	Jeffrey Maehl: 7 Receptions, 38 Yards

Considered by some to be Oregon's first test of the year, the Ducks, along with several mistakes, found out that this was almost too much for them to handle. Immediately surrendering the first points of the game to Purdue's Kory Sheets on an 80-yard touchdown run that was the second play of the game and turning the ball over twice in the first quarter resulted in a 20–3 deficit very early in the game. However, the Ducks were able to keep some of its offensive prowess, out gaining the Boilermakers 282 to 195 yards. It was the inability to put together a good drive that kept the Ducks down.

With the score in favor of Purdue 20–6, Oregon was able to score twice to even the score. The first came on an 87-yard punt return from Jairus Byrd and the second on a 96-yard drive that featured a 72-yard run by LeGarrette Blount. Both teams scored a field goal each in the fourth quarter leaving the game tied 23–23 at the end of regulation. Purdue did attempt a 44-yard field goal with :02 left on the clock, but that try was missed. In the first over time both Oregon and Purdue could do no better than a field goal and during the second over time Oregon's defense, which had worked so efficiently throughout the game, forced the Boilermakers to attempt a 47-yard field goal, which was missed. On the Ducks' possession of the overtime Chris Harper, Jeremiah Johnson and LeGarrette Blount all took turns running Oregon into the end zone for the game-winning touchdown.

During the Oregon possession of the first overtime, quarterback Justin Roper suffered a sprained knee and is currently expected to be out for two to four weeks. This means that for the Boise State game Oregon will be starting its third-string quarterback for only the third game of the year.

Top performers during the game are: Justin Roper completing 20 of 48 passes for 197 yards, LeGarrette Blount rushing for 132 yards and two touchdowns on 10 carries and tight end Ed Dickson catching seven passes for 93 yards.

=== Boise State ===
	1	2	3	4	Total
Broncos	0	24	13	0	37
Ducks	6	0	7	19	32

First ever meeting between the schools; Oregon traveled to Boise for the first time the next year in the 2009 season.

Passing Leaders	Rushing Leaders	Receiving Leaders
Darron Thomas: 13/25, 210 Yards, 3 Touchdowns	LeGarrette Blount: 18 Carries, 99 Yards, 1 Touchdown	Ed Dickson: 7 Receptions, 103 Yards, 2 Touchdowns
Jeremiah Masoli: 3/4, 27 Yards	Jeremiah Johnson: 22 Carries, 94 Yards, 1 Touchdown	Jeffrey Maehl: 2 Receptions, 46 Yards, 1 Touchdown
Chris Harper: 0/3, 0 Yards	Chris Harper: 9 Carries, 21 Yards	Terrance Scott: 3 Receptions, 45 Yards

Highlights of the game: Quarterback Kellen Moore (BSU) had 386 yards passing, running back LeGarrette Blount (ORE) rushed for 99 yards, and tight end Ed Dickson (ORE) received 103 yards.

=== Washington State ===
	1	2	3	4	Total
Ducks	21	14	21	7	63
Cougars	0	7	0	7	14

Oregon defeated Washington State 53–7 in Eugene last year, however, in 2008, the teams will be playing in Pullman and Washington State has hired a new coaching staff.

Passing Leaders	Rushing Leaders	Receiving Leaders
Jeremiah Masoli: 9/16, 161 Yards, 2 Touchdowns	LeGarrette Blount: 15 Carries, 98 Yards, 3 Touchdowns	Jaison Williams: 4 Receptions, 102 Yards, 2 Touchdowns
Darron Thomas: 0/3, 0 Yards	Jeremiah Johnson: 10 Carries, 89 Yards, 3 Touchdowns	Terrance Scott: 4 Receptions, 48 Yards
	Remene Alston: 6 Carries, 73 Yards	Aaron Pflugrad: 1 Reception, 11 Yards

Projected to have a 48–14 win, the Oregon Ducks certainly spoiled the homecoming of the Washington State Cougars. Three touchdowns in the first five minutes of play made this game unreachable for the Cougars. The Ducks never slowed down, scoring on a majority of their possessions, leaving Pullman with a 63–14 win. Jeremiah Masoli started for the Ducks. Running backs Jeremiah Johnson and LeGarrette Blount each ran for three touchdowns, while wide receiver Jaison Williams caught two touchdown passes, from Masoli.

=== USC ===
	1	2	3	4	Total
Ducks	7	3	0	0	10
Trojans	3	24	10	7	44

After defeating USC last year, the Ducks will aim to win again against the Trojans in Los Angeles.

The Ducks scored on the first possession of the game to lead 7–0 via a Jeremiah Johnson touchdown run. The Ducks led 10–3 in the second quarter, but a scoring explosion late in the second quarter on the part of the Trojans gave them a commanding 27–10 halftime lead. Oregon did not manage to score in the second half and went on to lose 44–10. Oregon's Jeremiah Johnson scored what would be the only touchdown given up by USC at home for the entire 2008 season

=== UCLA ===
	1	2	3	4	Total
Bruins	0	0	14	10	24
Ducks	7	7	7	10	31

The Ducks lost 16–0 last year in Los Angeles. It was Oregon's first time being shut-out since 1985 (at Nebraska).

After losing to the Bruins 16–0 in Los Angeles the year before, the Ducks beat the Bruins in Eugene 31–24. The Ducks took a 14–0 lead into the half and hung on to win in the second half. Jeremiah Masoli rushed for 170 yards and a touchdown.)

=== Arizona State ===
Team	1	2	3	4	Total
• Oregon	13	10	21	10	54
Arizona St	0	6	7	7	20

- Date: October 25
- Location: Sun Devil Stadium • Tempe, Arizona
- Game start: 10:05 p.m. EST

Scoring summary
1	12:54	ORE	Jeremiah Johnson 43-yard run (Jim Taylor kick)	Oregon 7–0
1	1:40	ORE	Jeremiah Masoli 3-yard run (two-point conversion failed)	Oregon 13–0
2	12:20	ORE	LeGarrette Blount 10-yard run (Matt Evensen kick)	Oregon 20–0
2	6:27	ORE	Matt Evensen 52-yard field goal	Oregon 23–0
2	2:01	ASU	Rudy Carpenter 1-yard run (kick failed)	Oregon 23–6
3	11:47	ORE	Jeremiah Johnson 6-yard run (Matt Evensen kick)	Oregon 30–6
3	10:04	ORE	LeGarrette Blount 19-yard run (Matt Evensen kick)	Oregon 37–6
3	3:54	ASU	Michael Jones 15-yard pass from Rudy Carpenter (Thomas Weber kick)	Oregon 37–17
3	:24	ORE	Terrence Scott 27-yard pass from Jeremiah Masoli (Matt Evensen kick)	Oregon 44–17
4	8:11	ORE	Matt Evensen 33-yard field goal	Oregon 47–17
4	5:27	ORE	Chris Harper 62-yard pass from Justin Roper (Matt Evensen kick)	Oregon 54–17
4	:52	ASU	T.J. Simpson 4-yard pass from Danny Sullivan (Thomas Weber kick)	Oregon 54–24

The Ducks have won the previous three meetings against the Sun Devils (including the last two in Tempe) by an average of 15 points per game.

=== California ===
	1	2	3	4	Total
Ducks	6	0	10	0	16
Golden Bears	9	7	3	7	26

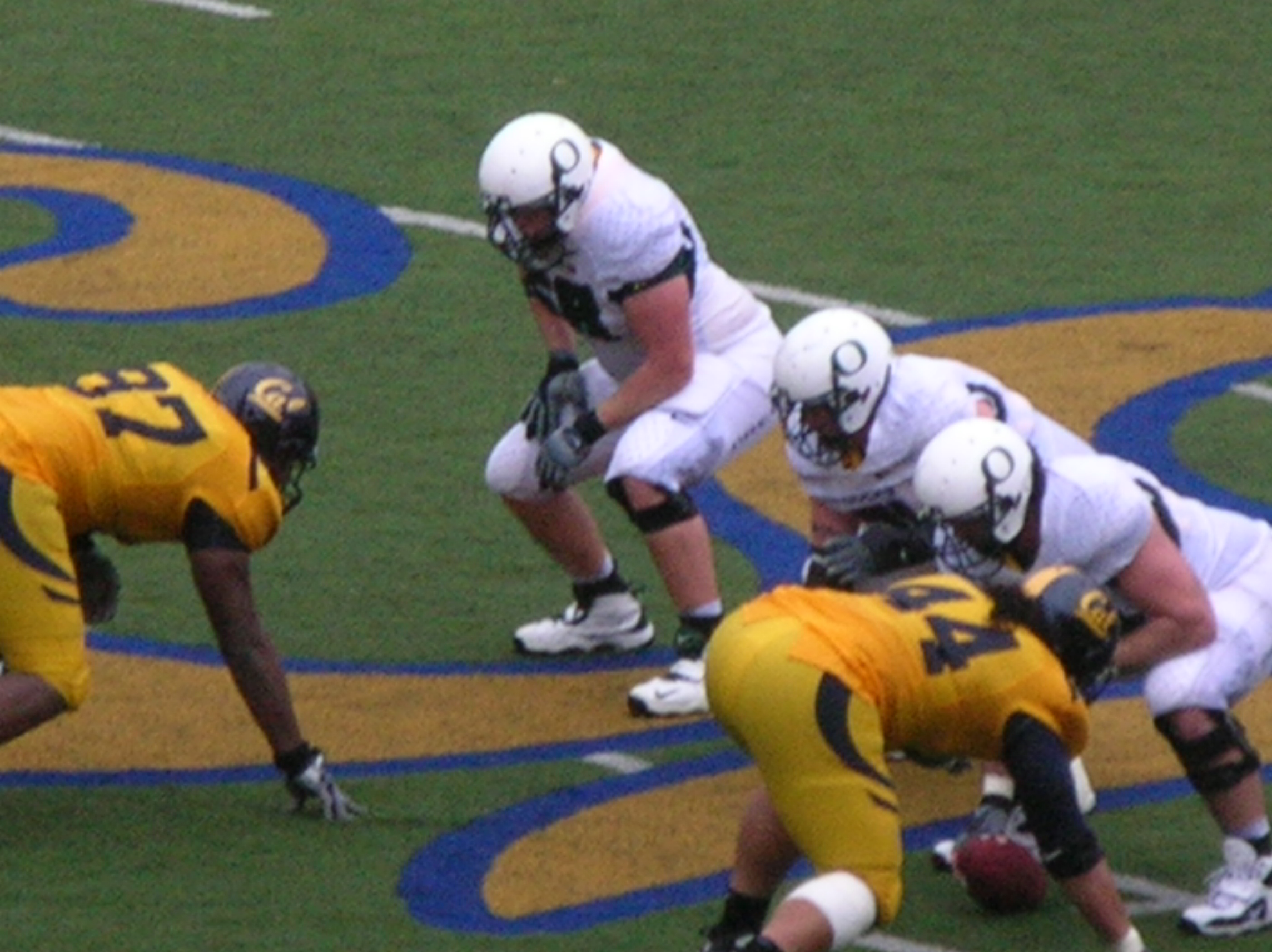
The Ducks on offense

Oregon faced an unranked Cal team on the road during a rainy day in Berkeley with Kevin Riley as the starter. Oregon capitalized on an interception at midfield on Cal's first possession with a 17-yard run by Jeremiah Masoli with the PAT missing. The Bears responded quickly with a 22-yard pass from Riley to Jeremy Ross on the ensuing possession. Jahvid Best was able to break free for a 50-yard run from the Cal 20, but fumbled the ball in Ducks territory. The Bears held the Ducks and got a safety when Oregon snapped the ball high and into the end zone on a punt attempt. Cal took advantage of the free kick to advance down the field, during which Riley sustained a concussion when he failed to slide while attempting to gain a first down and was sandwiched between three defenders. He did not return to the game and was replaced by Nate Longshore.

Best had his second fumble of the game in the second quarter, but Sean Cattouse then intercepted Masoli to negate it. The Bears fumbled again on a rushing attempt by Shane Vereen but the Ducks were stopped cold on a fourth down conversion attempt in Cal territory. The only score of the quarter was set up by a 50-yard interception return by Worrell Williams, capped off by a 2-yard pass from Longshore to Nyan Boateng.

Both teams traded field goals in third quarter until the Ducks blitzed down the field from their own 45-yard line and scored with three plays in 33 seconds on a 17-yard run by running back Jeremiah Johnson for their final score of the game. In the fourth quarter, Ducks cornerback Jairus Bryd fumbled a punt which was recovered by the Bears, allowing Vereen to score on a 2-yard run to put the game away.

Jeremiah Johnson went over the century mark with a 117 yards rushing, including a touchdown, the second rusher to do so against the Bears. Masoli himself had 97 rushing yards, more than double his 44 passing yards, including a touchdown run. For the Bears, Longshore finished with a 136 passing yards including one touchdown, while Best had 93 rushing yards.

=== Stanford ===
	1	2	3	4	Total
Cardinal	3	14	3	8	28
Ducks	17	3	7	8	35

Last year Oregon scored 55 against the Cardinal in California and have not lost to Stanford since 2001.

Oregon jumped out to a 17–3 early lead and led 20–17 at the half on a rain soaked field in Autzen Stadium. The Ducks had to rally and score a touchdown on a 7-yard run by LeGarrette Blount with 6 seconds left to pull out a 35–28 win. That brought the Ducks 2008 record to 7–3 but was not enough to return the Ducks to the top 25.

=== Arizona ===
	1	2	3	4	Total
Wildcats	10	7	7	21	45
Ducks	21	24	3	7	55

The Ducks will look to avenge the loss suffered when they traveled to Tucson and became one of many #2 ranked teams to lose last season. Oregon's last win against Arizona came in 2005

The Oregon Ducks started hot against the Arizona Wildcats in Eugene, with Jeremiah Masoli getting a career-high in rushing touchdowns (3) and broke the record for an Oregon quarterback in this category in a single Ducks game. He also had two passing touchdowns, all five in the first half. Oregon led at the half, 45–17, but Arizona started the second half hot. The Wildcats managed to hold the Ducks to merely ten points in the second half, while they had a 21-point fourth quarter to pull within three. However, a 40-yard touchdown hit from Masoli to LeGarrette Blounte sealed the Ducks win, 55–45, to avenge a loss to the Wildcats from last year.

This game was the first in which the Ducks wore their new "blackout" jerseys and black helmets, to fit with the Autzen Stadium "blackout" theme for the game.

=== Oregon State ===
Team	1	2	3	4	Total
• Oregon	17	20	7	21	65
Oregon State	7	10	14	7	38

- Date: November 29
- Location: Reser Stadium, Corvallis, Oregon
- Game start: 7:00 p.m. EST

Scoring summary
1	10:41	ORE	Jeff Maehl 17-yard pass from Jeremiah Masoli (Morgan Flint kick)	ORE 7–0
1	6:07	ORE	Morgan Flint 38-yard field goal	ORE 10–0
1	2:22	OSU	Jeremy Francis 20-yard pass from Lyle Moevao (Justin Kahut kick)	ORE 17–7
2	8:24	ORE	Morgan Flint 22-yard field goal	ORE 20–7
2	5:41	OSU	Justin Kahut 24-yard field goal	ORE 20–10
2	2:13	ORE	Morgan Flint 25-yard field goal	ORE 23–10
2	0:58	ORE	Jeremiah Johnson 83-yard run (Morgan Flint kick)	ORE 30–10
2	0:43	ORE	Walter Thurmond III 40-yard interception return (Morgan Flint kick)	ORE 37–10
2	0:09	OSU	Shane Morales 11-yard pass from Lyle Moevao (Justin Kahut kick)	ORE 37–17
3	8:35	OSU	Joe Halahuni 3-yard pass from Lyle Moevao (Justin Kahut kick)	ORE 37–24
3	6:02	ORE	Jeremiah Masoli 14-yard run (Morgan Flint kick)	ORE 44–24
3	2:45	OSU	Shane Morales 10-yard pass from Lyle Moevao (Justin Kahut kick)	ORE 44–31
4	14:19	ORE	Terence Scott 76-yard pass from Jeremiah Masoli (Morgan Flint kick)	ORE 51–31
4	8:34	OSU	Brady Camp 2-yard pass from Lyle Moevao (Justin Kahut kick)	ORE 51–38
4	3:59	ORE	Ed Dickson 45-yard pass from Jeremiah Masoli (Morgan Flint kick)	ORE 58–38
4	2:49	ORE	Spencer Paysinger 70-yard interception return (Morgan Flint kick)	ORE 65–38

Beavers won at Oregon for the first time since 1993 last year, ending a ten-year run of the home team winning in the series. This season the game is in Corvallis, a place the Ducks have not won at since 1996. The stakes for this game were recently raised – if the Ducks win, they will place second in the PAC-10 and will more than likely receive a Holiday Bowl berth. If the Beavers won, they would receive their first Rose Bowl berth since 1964, by virtue of their earlier win over Southern California.

None of that happened however, as Oregon gained 694 yards on 69 plays, a 10.1-yard-per-play average. The loss was a Civil War record for points allowed as well as yards allowed, and saw the Beavers fall from Rose Bowl hopefuls to being demoted to the third position in the Pac-10, playing in the Sun Bowl (won by the Beavers by a 3–0 score [sic]. The Ducks went on to win the Holiday Bowl over Oklahoma State, 42–31.

=== Holiday Bowl ===
Team	1	2	3	4	Total
Oklahoma State	17	0	7	7	31
• Oregon	7	0	21	14	42

- Date: December 30
- Location: Qualcomm Stadium, San Diego
- Game start: 8:00 p.m. EST
- Television network: ESPN

Scoring summary
1	10:54	OSU	Dan Bailey 45-yard field goal	OSU 3–0
1	4:09	OSU	Dez Bryant 33-yard pass from Zac Robinson (Dan Bailey kick)	OSU 10–0
1	3:51	ORE	Jeremiah Johnson 76-yard run (Morgan Flint kick)	OSU 10–7
1	1:03	OSU	Kendall Hunter 3-yard run (Dan Bailey kick)	OSU 17–7
3	14:15	ORE	Jeremiah Masoli 1-yard run (Morgan Flint kick)	OSU 17–14
3	8:02	ORE	Jeremiah Masoli 41-yard run (Morgan Flint kick)	ORE 21–17
3	5:08	OSU	Kendall Hunter 4-yard run (Dan Bailey kick)	OSU 24–21
3	0:21	ORE	Jeremiah Masoli 17-yard run (Morgan Flint kick)	ORE 28–24
4	12:13	OSU	Zac Robinson 1-yard run (Dan Bailey kick)	OSU 31–28
4	10:26	ORE	Jaison Williams 20-yard pass from Jeremiah Masoli (Morgan Flint kick)	ORE 35–31
4	3:01	ORE	LeGarrette Blount 29-yard run (Morgan Flint kick)	ORE 42–31

This is the third trip to the Holiday Bowl for the Ducks this decade. They beat Texas 35–30 in 2000, and lost to Oklahoma 17–14 in 2005. This will be Oklahoma State's second Holiday Bowl and first since 1988, when their current head coach Mike Gundy started at quarterback and that year's Heisman Trophy winner Barry Sanders lined up in the backfield. That team throttled Wyoming 62–14. This will be the first-ever meeting between the Ducks and Cowboys.

== Personnel ==
=== Roster ===
(as of August 27, 2008)
Cornerbacks: 6 Walter Thurmond III – Junior – West Covina, California; 8 Brian Butterfield – Sophomore – Sherwood, Oregon; 14 Javes Lewis – (redshirt) Freshman – Tustin, California; 17 Willie Glasper – Junior – Pittsburgh, California; 18 Anthony Gildon – Sophomore – Simi Valley, California; 32 Jairus Byrd – Junior no Mo– Clayton, Mo.; 36 William Wallace – (redshirt) Freshman – West Covina, California; 37 Talmadge Jackson III – Sophomore – Temecula, California; Defensive backs: 28 Scott Grady – Freshman – Tigard, Oregon; 31 Kenjon Barner – Freshman – Riverside, California; 34 Pono Kam – Junior – Honolulu, Hawaii; Defensive ends: 39 Will Tukuafu – Junior – Salt Lake City; 41 Matt Simms – (redshirt) Freshman – Carmel Valley, California; 49 Nick Reed – Senior – Trabuco Canyon, California; 45 Terrell Turner – (redshirt) Freshman – Los Angeles; 88 Brandon Bair – Sophomore – St. Anthony, Idaho; 89 Michael DiVincenzo – Junior – Porter Ranch, California; 95 Tonio Celotto – Sophomore – Oakland, California; 98 Dominic Glover – (redshirt) Freshman – Ladera Ranch, California; 99 Conrad Davis – Sophomore – Elmira, Oregon; Defensive tackles: 30 Justin Thompson – Junior – Inglewood, California; 43 Michael Speed – Senior – Los Angeles; 50 Simi Toeaina – Junior – Afono, Amer. Samoa; 72 Hamani Stevens – Freshman – Hemet, California; 90 Blake Ferras – Junior – San Jose, California; 91 Ra'Shon Harris – Senior – Pittsburg, California; 94 Hayden Piper – (redshirt) Freshman – Concord, California; 96 Mike Bellagamba – Junior – Los Altos, California; 97 Cole Linehan – Senior – Banks, Oregon; Free Safety: 1 Marvin Johnson – Sophomore – Compton, California; 20 John Boyett – Freshman – Napa, California; 27 Titus Jackson – Junior – Pomona, California; Halfbacks: 46 James Colson – sophomore – Kamuela, Hawaii	Linebackers: 33 Tyrell Irvin – Sophomore – Denver, Colo.; 40 John Bacon – Senior – Golden, Colo.; 44 Brandon Hanna – (redshirt) Freshman – Coeur d'Alene, Idaho; 45 Terrell Turner – (redshirt) Freshman – Los Angeles; 47 Kiko Alonso – Freshman – Los Gatos, California; 52 Terrance Pritchett – (redshirt) Freshman – Sacramento, California; 53 Dewitt Stuckey – Freshman – Stockton, California; 55 Casey Matthews – Sophomore – Agoura Hills, California; 56 Blake Thompson – (redshirt) Freshman – Cottage Grove, Oregon; 58 Kenny Rowe – Sophomore – Long Beach, California; 59 Jeff Palmer – Freshman – Dana Point, California; 87 Zach Taylor – Junior – Austin, Texas; Offensive guards: 63 Jon Teague – Senior – Portland, Oregon; Offensive linemen: 51 Jeff Kendall – Senior – Colorado Springs, Colorado; 54 Jordan Holmes – Sophomore – Yuba City, California; 61 Nick Cody – Freshman – Brush Prairie, Washington; 62 Rhein Amacher – Freshman – Lake Oswego, Oregon; 64 Max Forer – Sophomore – Santa Monica, California; 68 C.E. Kaiser – Sophomore – Veradale, Washington; 69 Bo Thran – Sophomore – Gresham, Oregon; 70 Ramsen Golpashin – (redshirt) Freshman – Santa Clarita, California; 71 Mark Lewis – Senior – Arroyo Grande, California; 74 Darrion Weems – (redshirt) Freshman – Winnetka, California; 77 Carson York – Freshman – Coeur d'Alene, Idaho; 79 Mark Asper – Sophomore – Idaho Falls, Idaho; Offensive tackles: 57 Fenuki Tupou – Senior – Elverta, California; 60 Max Unger – Senior – Honaunau, Hawai'i; 65 Lance Barker – Freshman – Anaheim, California; 76 Charlie Carmichael – (redshirt) Freshman – Sherman Oaks, California; 78 Jacob Hucko – Senior – Buena Park, California; Punters: 26 Tim Taylor – Sophomore – Corvallis, Oregon; 80 Josh Syria – Senior – Wenatchee, Washington; Place kickers: 23 Morgan Flint – Junior – Bend, Oregon; 41 Daniel Padilla – Sophomore – Corona, California; 85 Matt Evensen – Senior – Portland, Oregon; 93 Rob Beard – Freshman – Fullerton, California	Quarterbacks: 1 Darron Thomas – Freshman – Houston, Texas; 2 Jeremiah Masoli – Sophomore – Daly City, California; 3 Chris Harper – Freshman – Wichita, Kansas; †7 Nate Costa – Sophomore – Hilmar, California; 11 Justin Roper – Sophomore – Buford, Ga.; Running backs: 5 Remene Alston Jr. – Sophomore – Greensboro, North Carolina; 9 LeGarrette Blount – Junior – Perry, Florida; 21 LaMichael James – Freshman – Texarkana, Texas; 22 Andre Crenshaw – Junior – Lancaster, California; 24 Jeremiah Johnson – Senior – Los Angeles; 26 Malachi Lewis – Sophomore – Oxnard, California; Rovers: 2 T. J. Ward – Junior – Antioch, California; 5 Max Pond – Freshman – Sonoma, California; 15 Patrick Chung – Senior – Rancho Cucamonga, California; ‡29 Todd Doxey – (redshirt) Freshman – San Diego; Strong Side Linebackers: 13 Jerome Boyd – Senior – Los Angeles; 35 Spencer Paysinger – Sophomore – Los Angeles; 38 Eddie Pleasant – (redshirt) Freshman – La Palma, California; 54 Riley Showalter – Junior – Portland, Oregon; 56 Josh Kaddu – Freshman – Vacaville, California; 25 Tyler Briffett – Freshman – Boston; Tight ends: 12 NaDerris Ward – Sophomore – Oakland, California; 42 David Paulson – (redshirt) Freshman – Auburn, Washington; 83 Ed Dickson – Junior – Bellflower, California; 84 Mychal Rivera – Freshman – Van Nuys, California; 96 Jennings Stewart – Freshman – Grants Pass, Oregon; Wide receivers: 4 Jaison Williams – Senior – Inglewood, California; 8 Terence Scott – Senior – Knoxville, Tenn.; 14 Elvis Akpla – (redshirt) Freshman – Portland, Oregon; 2 Ellis Krout – Junior – Dallas, Texas; 19 Blake Cantù – Freshman – Southlake, Texas; 23 Jeff Maehl – Sophomore – Paradise, California; 31 Justin Hoffman – Freshman – Eugene, Oregon; 82 Drew Davis – Sophomore – Denver; 86 Kevin Oberding – Sophomore – Clackamas, Oregon; 89 Aaron Pflugrad – Sophomore – Eugene, Oregon; 91 Rory Cavaille – Junior – Shelton, Washington; 94 Michael Mackie – (redshirt) Freshman – Wallingford, Conn.; 98 Brody Wilkins – Freshman – Marcola, Oregon
† Injured
‡ Player Deceased

=== Coaching staff ===
- Mike Bellotti – Head coach
- Steve Greatwood – Offensive line
- Nick aliotti – Defensive coordinator
- Chip Kelly – Offensive coordinator & quarterbacks
- Gary campbell – Running backs
- Michael gray – Defensive line
- John neal – Secondary
- Tom osborne – Tight ends & special teams
- Don pellum – Linebackers & recruiting coordinator
- Robin pflugrad – Wide receivers
- Jim radcliffe – Head strength and conditioning coach
- Eddy morrissey – Graduate assistant coach
- Matt Dawson – Graduate assistant coach
- Jeff hawkins – Assistant athletic director/football operations
- Jim Fisher – Special teams intern

== Rankings ==
Ranking movements Legend: ██ Increase in ranking ██ Decrease in ranking — = Not ranked
	Week																
Poll	Pre	1	2	3	4	5	6	7	8	9	10	11	12	13	14	15	Final
AP	21	18	16	17	—	23	—	—	—	23	—	—	24	19	16	15	10
Coaches	20	16	14	12	22	20	—	—	—	24	—	—	22	18	14	13	9
Harris	Not released					21	—	—	—	24	—	—	22	19	15	15	Not released
BCS	Not released								—	24	—	—	24	23	19	19	Not released

== Statistics ==
=== Team ===
	Team	Opp
Scoring	503	336
Points per game	41.9	28.0
First downs	279	249
Rushing	149	74
Passing	102	148
Penalty	28	27
Total offense	5738	4596
Avg per play	6.5	4.9
Avg per game	478.2	383.0
Fumbles lost	24–13	21–15
Penalties – yards	89–772	87–881
Avg per game	64.3	73.4

	Team	Opp
Punts – yards	52-2225	73-2777
Avg per Punt	42.8	38.0
Time of possession/game	25:19	34:41
3rd down conversions	66–169	85–211
4th down conversions	7–17	7–17
Touchdowns scored	65	40
Field goals – attempts	18–25	18–25
PAT – attempts	57–60	36–37
Attendance	350661	345515
Games/Avg Per Game	6/58444	6/57586

==== Scores by quarter ====
	1	2	3	4	OT	2OT	Total
Oregon	146	108	125	115	3	6	503
Opponents	45	130	71	87	3	0	336

=== Offense ===
==== Rushing ====
Name	GP	Att	Gain	Loss	Net	Avg	TD	Long	Avg/G
Jeremiah Johnson	12	156	1133	51	1082	6.9	12	83	90.2
LeGarrette Blount	12	130	961	33	928	7.1	16	72	77.3
Jeremiah Masoli	11	111	724	112	612	5.5	7	66	55.6
Remene Alston	7	21	166	5	161	7.7	1	43	23.0
Chris Harper	11	35	167	30	137	3.9	2	21	12.5
Terence Scott	12	8	126	0	126	15.8	1	51	10.5
Andre Crenshaw	12	22	123		118	5.4	1	39	9.8
Justin Roper	6	17	106	21	85	5.0	1	16	14.2
Jeffrey Maehl	12	10	88	3	85	8.5	0	15	7.1
Darron Thomas	5	13	42	15	27	2.1	1	12	5.4
Jamere Holland	6	2	26	0	26	13.0	0	16	4.3
Ed Dickson	12	3	18	0	18	6.0	0	9	1.5
Marvin Johnson	10	1	3	0	3	3.0	0	3	0.3
Matt Larkin	12	1	0	0	0	0.0	0	0	0.0
Aaron Plugrad	12	1	0	5	−5	−5.0	0	0	−0.4
TEAM	9	14	0	69	−69	−4.9	0	0	−7.7
Total	12	545	3683	349	3334	6.1	42	83	277.8
Opponents	12	466	1826	393	1433	3.1	15	80	119.4

==== Passing ====
Name	GP	Effic	Cmp-Att-Int	Pct	Yds	TD	Lng	Avg/G
Jeremiah Masoli	11	132.6	118–207–4	57.0	1486	12	76	135.1
Justin Roper	6	111.1	48–91–4	52.7	610	3	62	101.7
Darron Thomas	5	140.6	16–33–1	48.5	268	3	41	53.6
Chris Harper	11	74.0	4–9–2	44.4	40	1	31	3.6
Ed Dickson	12	0.0	0–1–0	0.0	0	0	0	0.0
Total	12	125.7	186–341–11	54.5	2404	19	76	200.3
Opponents	12	124.1	279–480–14	58.1	3163	24	73	263.6

==== Receiving ====
Name	GP	No.	Yds	Avg	TD	Long	Avg/G
Terence Scott	12	42	626	14.9	5	76	52.2
Jeff Maehl	12	37	420	11.4	5	65	35.0
Ed Dickson	12	33	479	14.5	3	45	39.9
Jaison Williams	12	33	421	12.8	3	48	35.1
Chris Harper	11	9	122	13.6	2	62	11.1
Jeremiah Johnson	12	7	69	9.9	0	25	5.8
Aaron Pflugrad	12	6	79	13.2	0	26	6.6
Drew Davis	9	5	85	17.0	0	45	9.4
Andre Crenshaw	12	2	29	14.5	0	31	2.4
Rory Cavaille	11	2	12	6.0	1	9	1.1
Malachi Lewis	12	2	11	5.5	0	6	0.9
Jamere Holland	6	2	8	4.0	0	8	1.3
LeGarrette Blount	12	2	2	1.0	0	2	0.2
Mike Mackie	1	1	14	14.0	0	14	14.0
Remene Alston	7	1	10	10.0	0	10	1.4
Matt Larkin	12	1	10	10.0	0	10	0.8
Jairus Byrd	12	1	7	7.0	0	7	0.6
Total	12	186	2404	12.9	19	76	200.3
Opponents	12	279	3163	11.3	24	73	263.6

=== Defense ===
Name	GP	Tackles				Sacks	Pass defense				Fumbles		Blkd kick	Saf
Name	GP	Solo	Ast	Total	TFL-yds	No-yds	Int-yds	BrUp	PD	QBH	Rcv-yds	FF	Blkd kick	Saf
T.J. Ward	12	61	32	93	5.5–13	1.0–3	1–16	7	8			4		
Spencer Paysinger	12	39	47	86	9.0–18	2.0–8	2–70	6	8	1				
Patrick Chung	12	52	30	82	6.5–34	2.0–18	1–31	6	7	1	1–3	1		
Jerome Boyd	12	48	27	75	6.0–33	3.0–26		5	5	2	1–0	1		
Jairus Byrd	12	54	20	74	1.5–3		4–13	14	18		1–0	1		
Walter Thurmond III	11	46	15	61	1.0–3		4–67	7	11					
Casey Matthews	12	32	26	58	11.0–40	2.0–10		2	2	3				
Will Tukuafu	12	30	22	52	16.0–68	7.0–44		2	2	1	1–0	1		
Nick Reed	12	34	16	50	19.5–104	13.0–83		2	2	12	5–0	1		
Ra'shon Harris	12	24	18	42	7.0–22	2.0–8				1	2–0			
Talmidge Jackson	12	20	10	30			2–0	3	5					
Willie Glasper	12	18	2	20										
Cole Linehan	12	9	11	20	2.0–4	1.5–2				1	1–0			
Javes Lewis	12	11	7	18				3	3					
John Bacon	10	8	10	18	2.5–7	1.0–5								
Eddie Pleasant	11	11	4	15				2	2			1		
Marvin Johnson	10	8	6	14							1–21			
Michael Speed	12	8	5	13	2.5–12	2.5–12				1				
Kenny Rowe	12	9	1	10				2	2			1		
Riley Showalter	12	3	6	9				1	1					
Tonio Celotto	10	4	4	8	1.0–1									
Garrett Embry	12	4	3	7										
Brandon Bair	12	4	3	7							1–24	1		
Jeff Maehl	12	5	1	6	0.5–1									
Josh Kaddu	5	3	2	5										
Brandon Hanna	4	3	1	4										
Titus Jackson	6	1	3	4				1	1					
Total	12	566	341	907	93–366	38–227	14–197	64	78	23	15–54	12		
Opponents	12	506	364	870	80–259	18–102	11–173	40	51	2	13–0	12	2	2

=== Special teams ===
Name	Punting								Kickoffs				
Name	No.	Yds	Avg	Long	TB	FC	I20	Blkd	No.	Yds	Avg	TB	OB
Josh Syria	4	175	43.8	52	1	1	2	0					
Matt Evensen									8	544	68.0	5	0
Morgan Flint													
Total	4	175	43.8	52	1	1	2	0	8	544	68.0	5	0
Opponents	10	356	35.6	57	0	3	0	0	3	204	68.0	2	0

Name	Punt returns					Kick returns				
Name	No.	Yds	Avg	TD	Long	No.	Yds	Avg	TD	Long
Andre Crenshaw						1	24	24.0	0	24
Jarius Byrd	5	78	15.6	0	51					
Total	5	78	15.6	0	51	1	24	24.0	0	24
Opponents	1	−1	−1.0	0	0	3	36	12.0	0	21
