= Walter Thurmond =

American football player (born 1987)

Walter Thurmond III
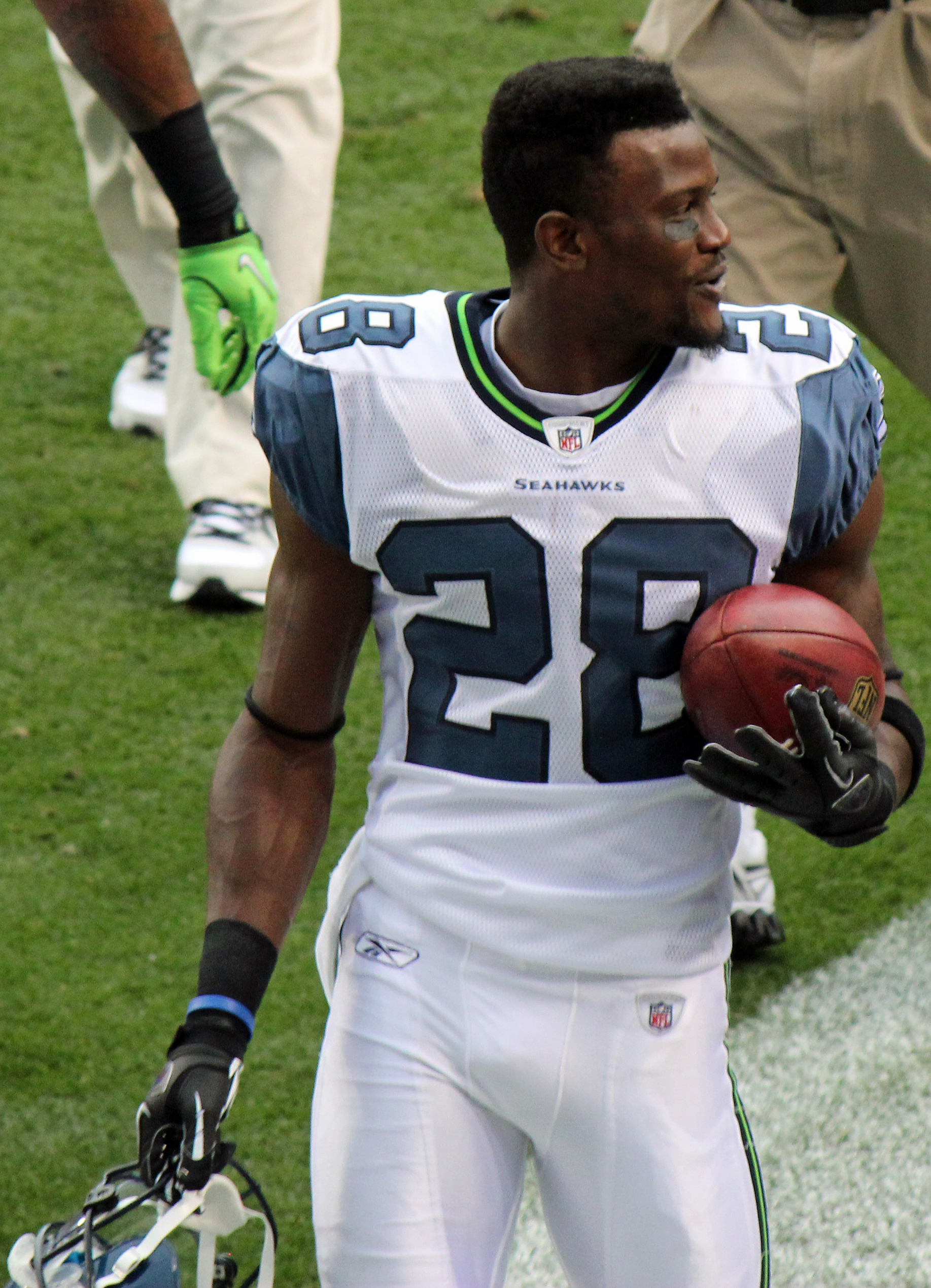
- Thurmond with the Seattle Seahawks in 2011

No. 28, 24, 26
- Position: Safety

Personal information
- Born: August 12, 1987 (age 39); Los Angeles, California, U.S.
- Listed height: 5 ft 11 in (1.80 m)
- Listed weight: 190 lb (86 kg)

Career information
- High school: West Covina (West Covina, California)
- College: Oregon (2005–2009)
- NFL draft: 2010: 4th round, 111th overall pick

Career history
- Seattle Seahawks (2010–2013); New York Giants (2014); Philadelphia Eagles (2015)

Awards and highlights
- Super Bowl champion (XLVIII)

Career NFL statistics
- Total tackles: 160
- Sacks: 3.0
- Forced fumbles: 4
- Fumble recoveries: 2
- Interceptions: 4
- Defensive touchdowns: 2
- Stats at Pro Football Reference

Walter Riley Thurmond III (born August 12, 1987) is an American former professional football player who was a safety in the National Football League. He was selected by the Seattle Seahawks in the fourth round of the 2010 NFL draft. He won Super Bowl XLVIII with the Seahawks over the Denver Broncos, and he also played for the New York Giants and Philadelphia Eagles. He played college football for the Oregon Ducks.

Thurmond was a founding member of the Seahawks defensive unit nicknamed the Legion of Boom.

== Early life ==
Thurmond attended West Covina High School in West Covina, California, where he was a two-sport star in both football and track. Considered one of California's fastest players, he helped lead West Covina to the CIF Southern Section Division VII championship and a 11–2–1. He recorded 29 receptions for 730 yards and seven touchdowns his senior season in addition to rushing for more than 400 yards and two more scores. He added 85 tackles and five interceptions to earn All-San Gabriel Valley Region honors. He also received All-CIF Southern Section second-team plaudits as a wide receiver in 2004 after attracting first-team All-San Antonio League, All-CIF And all-Valley attention following his 2003 campaign.

Also a standout in track & field, Thurmond made it to the finals of the 2005 USATF Junior Championships in the 110m hurdles, placing eight (14.65 s). As a junior, he ran a season-best time of 14.29 seconds, and in the CIF State Meet, he missed the final by only .10 seconds. He owned personal-bests of 14.16 seconds in the 110m hurdles, 6 ft 8 in (2.03 m) in the high jump and 15 ft 7 in (4.75 m) in the pole vault.

== College career ==
Thurmond played football and ran track at the University of Oregon from 2005 to 2009. He became a starter as a redshirt freshman in 2006, earning honorable mention for the all-Pac-10 team. Thurmond III once again was awarded an honorable mention all-Pac-10 in 2007. After battling injuries in 2008, Thurmond III finished with 5 interceptions, along with one in the 2008 Holiday Bowl.

On September 26 against Cal, Thurmond III was hurt and did not return after a hit to the knee on the opening kickoff return. It was later determined that Thurmond III had torn three ligaments in his knee, and would miss the remainder of the 2009 season.

== Professional career ==
Pre-draft measurables
Height	Weight	Arm length	Hand span
5 ft 10 3/4 in (1.80 m)	189 lb (86 kg)	32 3/4 in (0.83 m)	9 5/8 in (0.24 m)
All values from NFL Combine

=== Seattle Seahawks ===
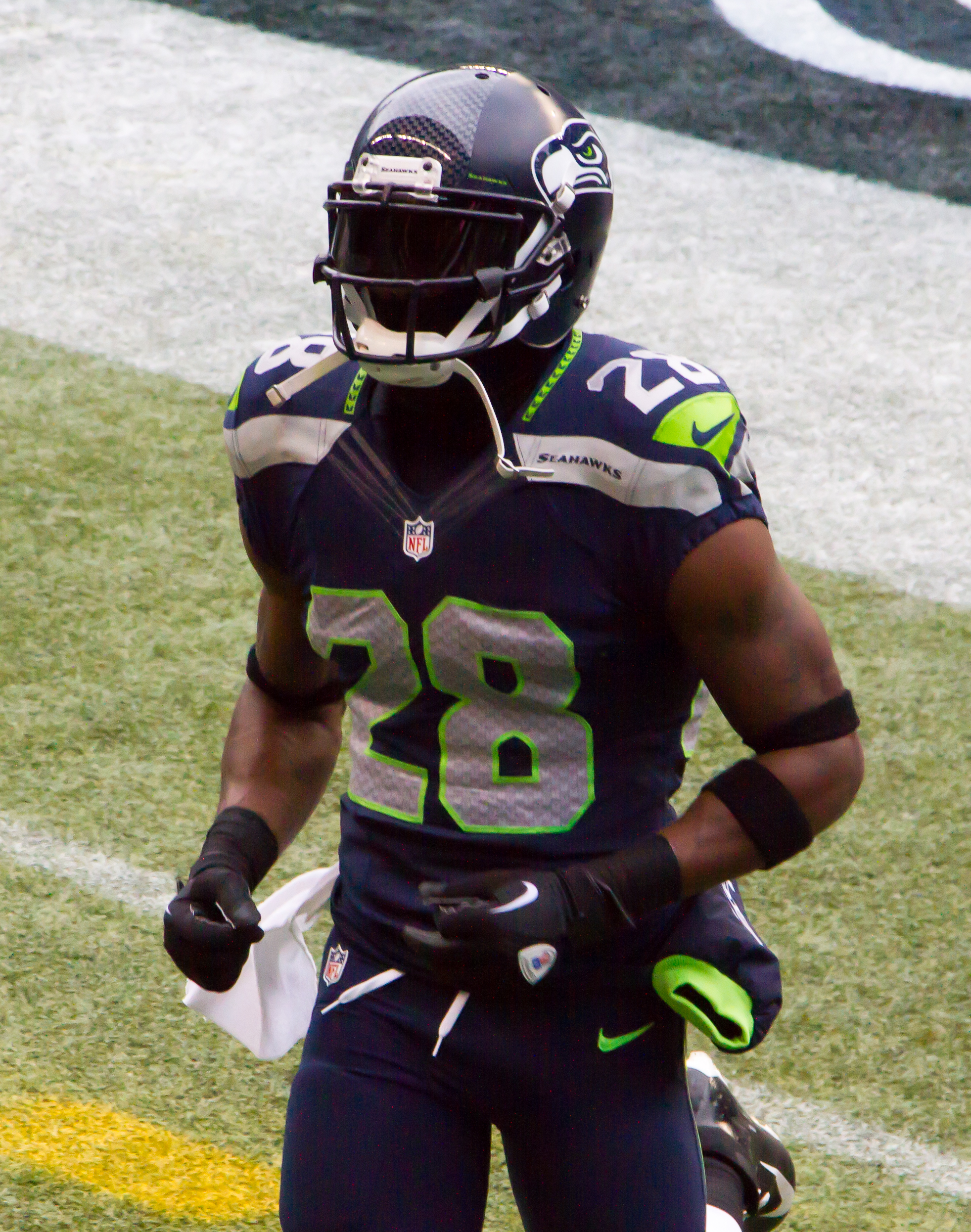
Thurmond with the Seahawks in 2013

Thurmond was drafted by the Seattle Seahawks in the fourth round (111th overall) of the 2010 NFL draft. He was signed to a contract on June 17, 2010. He was expected to replace Kelly Jennings as the starting corner for the 2011 season.

On October 24, 2011, Thurmond was placed on injured reserve with a broken fibula and high ankle sprain, ending his season.

==== Super Bowl XLVIII ====
Before the 2013 NFL season, Thurmond's previous seasons were hampered by injuries that ultimately delayed his development. Thurmond began the 2013 NFL season serving a four-game suspension then returned to replace Brandon Browner who had lost trail speed and was less effective in slot coverage. The Seahawks' secondary would ultimately thrive in 2013 with him, Brandon Browner, Richard Sherman, Kam Chancellor, Earl Thomas, and Byron Maxwell all excelling together as the Legion of Boom. Thurmond defended the slot throughout the season and stepped in for the suspended Browner in the postseason to help the Seahawks franchise win its first Super Bowl, defeating the Denver Broncos, 43–8. After the success of the Seahawks' secondary, Thurmond became a coveted free agent along with former teammate Brandon Browner.

=== New York Giants ===
Thurmond was signed to a one-year deal with the New York Giants on March 16, 2014. On September 15, Thurmond was placed on injured reserve after a torn pectoral sustained in a Week 2 game against the Arizona Cardinals.

=== Philadelphia Eagles ===
On March 11, 2015, Thurmond signed a one-year deal with the Philadelphia Eagles.

During the off-season, Thurmond changed position to safety due to the team's lack of depth at the position. He started the season strong, intercepting 3 passes in the first 5 games, which at the time made him the NFL's co-leader in interceptions. On November 15, 2015, Thurmond converted a safety against the Dolphins in a 20–19 loss.

In a week 17 win over the Giants, his former team, he intercepted Eli Manning and returned it 83 yards for a touchdown. This is recorded in professional game logs as a fumble recovery and does not count towards his interception total.

Thurmond had his best year statistically, with 71 tackles, 3 interceptions, 7 pass deflections, 2 sacks, 2 forced fumbles, and 1 safety, all career highs.

Although Thurmond was a sought after free agent and had offers of over $4 million per year, Thurmond decided to retire on May 31, 2016.

== NFL career statistics ==
Legend
**Bold**	Career high

=== Regular season ===
Year	Team	Games		Tackles					Interceptions					Fumbles			
Year	Team	GP	GS	Cmb	Solo	Ast	Sck	TFL	Int	Yds	TD	Lng	PD	FF	FR	Yds	TD
2010	SEA	14	1	37	33	4	0.0	0	0	0	0	0	**7**	0	0	0	0
2011	SEA	6	3	12	7	5	0.0	1	0	0	0	0	2	1	0	0	0
2012	SEA	2	1	3	3	0	0.0	1	0	0	0	0	1	0	0	0	0
2013	SEA	12	3	33	24	9	1.0	**3**	1	29	**1**	29	6	1	**1**	-2	0
2014	NYG	2	1	4	2	2	0.0	0	0	0	0	0	0	0	0	0	0
2015	PHI	**16**	**16**	**71**	**52**	**19**	**2.0**	**3**	**3**	**67**	0	**44**	**7**	**2**	**1**	**83**	**1**
		52	25	160	121	39	3.0	8	4	96	1	44	23	4	2	81	1

=== Playoffs ===
Year	Team	Games		Tackles					Interceptions					Fumbles			
Year	Team	GP	GS	Cmb	Solo	Ast	Sck	TFL	Int	Yds	TD	Lng	PD	FF	FR	Yds	TD
2010	SEA	2	0	**5**	**3**	2	0.0	0	0	0	0	0	0	0	0	0	0
2013	SEA	**3**	**1**	**5**	2	**3**	0.0	0	0	0	0	0	**1**	0	0	0	0
		5	1	10	5	5	0.0	0	0	0	0	0	1	0	0	0	0
