= Justin Roper =

American football player and coach (born 1987)

Furman Paladins
- Title: Offensive coordinator / quarterbacks coach

Personal information
- Born: July 28, 1987 (age 39); Atlanta, Georgia, U.S.
- Listed height: 6 ft 6 in (1.98 m)
- Listed weight: 218 lb (99 kg)

Career information
- Position: Quarterback (No. 11, 18)
- High school: Buford (Buford, Georgia)
- College: Oregon (2007–2008); Montana (2009–2010)
- NFL draft: 2011: undrafted

Career history

Playing
- Chicago Rush (2012); Orlando Predators (2012)

Coaching
- Findlay (2013) Running backs coach; Valdosta State (2014–2015) Quarterbacks coach; Slippery Rock (2016–2018) Offensive coordinator/quarterbacks coach; Northern Iowa (2019) Quarterbacks coach; Holy Cross (2020–2021) Offensive coordinator/quarterbacks coach; Furman (2022–present) Offensive coordinator/quarterbacks coach

Career AFL statistics
- Pass Att–Com: 134–76
- Percentage: 56.7
- TD–INT: 15–8
- Passing yards: 815
- Passer rating: 77.80
- Stats at ArenaFan.com

Justin Parks Roper (born July 28, 1987) is an American former football quarterback. He played college football at Oregon and Montana, and professionally in the Arena Football League (AFL) with the Chicago Rush and Orlando Predators.

== Early life ==
Roper lettered in football, basketball, track and field and swimming for the Buford High School Wolves of Buford, Georgia. He was ranked as one of the top 28 quarterbacks in the country after compiling a 12–1 record and an 8-AA league championship in 2005.

== College career ==
Roper was redshirted by the Oregon Ducks of the University of Oregon in 2006. He made his first collegiate start in the 2007 Sun Bowl on December 31, 2007 against the South Florida Bulls, throwing for four touchdowns and leading the Ducks to a 56–21 victory. He finished his career at the University of Oregon with nine touchdown passes and 952 passing yards.

Roper transferred to the University of Montana in 2009, where he played football for the Montana Grizzlies. He also played basketball for the Grizzlies.

=== Statistics ===
Year	Team	Passing								Rushing			
Year	Team	Cmp	Att	Pct	Yds	Y/A	TD	Int	Rtg	Att	Yds	Avg	TD
2007	Oregon	32	61	52.5	342	5.6	6	2	125.5	15	1	0.1	1
2008	Oregon	48	91	52.7	610	6.7	3	4	111.1	17	85	5.0	1
2009	Montana	78	134	58.2	951	7.1	8	3	133.0	23	52	2.3	0
2010	Montana	171	278	61.5	1,885	6.8	19	11	133.1	58	120	2.1	2
Career		329	564	58.3	3,788	6.7	36	20	128.7	113	258	2.3	4

== Professional career ==
Roper was rated the 25th best quarterback in the 2011 NFL draft by NFLDraftScout.com.

He was signed by the Chicago Rush of the AFL on September 30, 2011. He was traded to the Orlando Predators on April 2, 2012. Roper threw for 15 touchdowns and 815 passing yards for the Predators in 2012.

== Coaching career ==
Roper began his coaching career as the running backs coach at the University of Findlay in 2013. He helped running back Daiquone Ford record 1,789 yards and a school record 24 rushing touchdowns while earning All-American honors. Roper was quarterbacks coach at Valdosta State University from 2014 to 2015. On March 1, 2016, he was named the offensive coordinator and quarterbacks coach at Slippery Rock University of Pennsylvania.
