= Jeremiah Masoli =

American gridiron football player (born 1988)

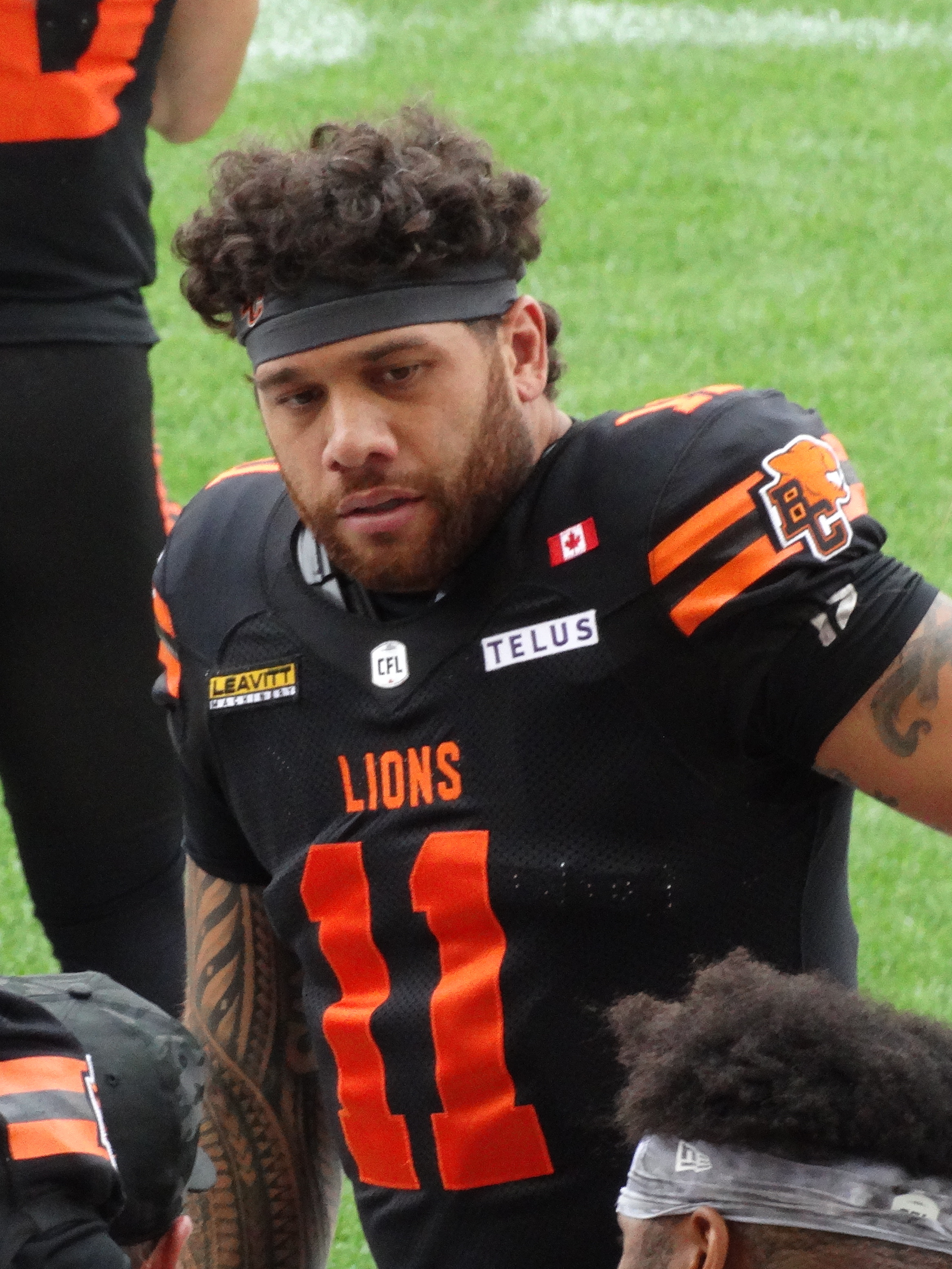
- Masoli with the BC Lions in 2025

Profile
- Position: Quarterback

Personal information
- Born: August 24, 1988 (age 38); San Francisco, California, U.S.
- Listed height: 5 ft 11 in (1.80 m)
- Listed weight: 228 lb (103 kg)

Career information
- High school: Saint Louis School (Honolulu, Hawaii)
- College: Oregon (2008–2009); Ole Miss (2010)
- NFL draft: 2011: undrafted

Career history
- San Francisco 49ers (2011)*; Omaha Nighthawks (2011); Edmonton Eskimos (2012); Hamilton Tiger-Cats (2013–2021); Ottawa Redblacks (2022–2024); BC Lions (2025)
- * Offseason or practice squad member only

Awards and highlights
- Terry Evanshen Trophy (2018); CFL East All-Star (2018); Second-team All-Pac-10 (2009); CFL record: CFL record for most consecutive completions in a game (23), July 23, 2016

Career CFL statistics as of 2025
- Passing completions: 1,443
- Passing attempts: 2,178
- Percentage: 66.3
- TD–INT: 89–67
- Passing yards: 18,362
- Stats at CFL.ca
- Stats at Pro Football Reference

Jeremiah Taeatafa Masoli (born August 24, 1988) is an American professional football quarterback. He was signed by the San Francisco 49ers of the National Football League (NFL) as an undrafted free agent in 2011. He played college football at the City College of San Francisco, University of Oregon, and the University of Mississippi. Masoli has also been a member of the Omaha Nighthawks of the United Football League (UFL), and the Edmonton Eskimos, Hamilton Tiger-Cats, and Ottawa Redblacks of the CFL.

== Early life ==
Jeremiah Taeatafa Masoli was born August 24, 1988, in San Francisco, California where he spent some of his life before moving to Hawaii. He attended Saint Louis School in Honolulu, Hawaii, where he excelled in football.

== College career ==
=== Oregon ===
==== 2008 season ====
Masoli transferred from the City College of San Francisco to the University of Oregon in 2008. In 2008 for the Ducks, Masoli emerged from the third-string quarterback to starter as injuries plagued the depth chart. He threw for 13 touchdowns and 5 interceptions, while also rushing for 10 touchdowns. His 714 rushing yards in 2008 set an Oregon record for quarterbacks. Masoli led the team to a 42–31 victory against Oklahoma State in the 2008 Holiday Bowl.

==== 2009 season ====
Masoli was named to the Davey O'Brien Award watch list for the 2009 college football season. He also appeared on the cover of a regional August 2009 issue of Sports Illustrated along with center Jordan Holmes.

In October 2009, Masoli helped lead the #10 Ducks to an upset over the then #4 USC Trojans with 222 passing yards, 164 rushing yards and two touchdowns.

Masoli helped the Ducks win the Pac-10 Championship, advancing them to the Rose Bowl where they lost to the Ohio State Buckeyes 26-17. Masoli was 9/20 passing with 81 yards and an interception, while rushing for 9 yards and a touchdown.

For the season, he completed 177 of 305 passes for 2,147 yards and 15 touchdowns, and ran for 13 scores. His 2,815 yards of total offense stands eighth on the school's single-season list.

On January 25, 2010, Masoli and teammate Garrett Embry were identified as suspects in a theft on the University of Oregon campus. On March 12, 2010, Masoli pleaded guilty to second-degree burglary, receiving 12 months probation. Masoli was then suspended for the entire 2010 season by head coach Chip Kelly.

In June 2010, Masoli was cited for misdemeanor drug and traffic offenses, and was dismissed from the team. He later pleaded guilty to marijuana possession and a moving violation stemming from the traffic stop. Prior to his being kicked off the team, he would have been eligible to play in the 2011 season had he satisfied the requirements set forth by Kelly.

Media outlets reported on July 25, 2010, that Masoli had sent his scholarship release papers to a number of schools, notably Ole Miss. The report included Ole Miss rival Mississippi State, Hawaii, UNLV, Louisiana Tech, and Syracuse. Masoli would presumably be eligible to play in the 2010 season after completing his undergraduate degree at Oregon; he would need to enroll in graduate study not currently offered at Oregon in order to be eligible at the next institution.

=== Ole Miss ===
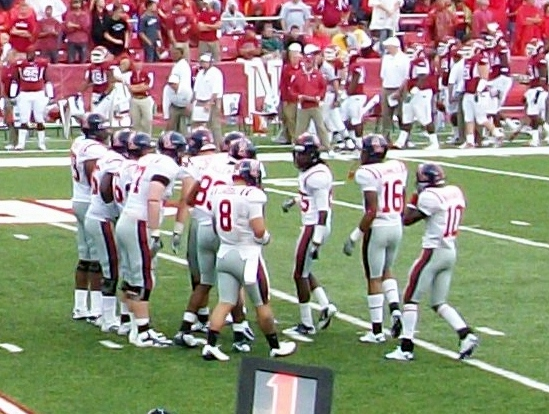
Masoli in 2010 while at Ole Miss

On August 31, 2010, the NCAA denied Masoli's waiver for immediate eligibility at Ole Miss. In a press release, the NCAA stated that the transfer exception cited in Masoli's case is intended for students pursuing new academic study, not avoiding disciplinary punishments. Ole Miss appealed the decision, and school officials expected a response from the NCAA before Ole Miss's second game of 2010. Ole Miss coach Houston Nutt expressed his disagreement with the NCAA's ruling; some reports suggested that Masoli was likely to be named a team captain for 2010 given his eligibility. On September 3, 2010, the ad hoc NCAA Subcommittee for Legislative Relief granted Ole Miss's appeal, allowing Masoli to play immediately in the 2010 home opener versus Jacksonville State University.

For the season at Ole Miss, Masoli was 169-of-296 for 2,039 yards, 14 touchdowns, and thirteen interceptions. In addition, he rushed 121 times for 544 yards and six touchdowns, and he punted three times, averaging 43.7 yards per kick.

On April 9, 2011, at the Ole Miss Spring game, Masoli was honored with the 2010 Leadership Award from the Birmingham Alumni Club.

== Professional career ==
Pre-draft measurables
| Height | Weight | 40-yard dash | 10-yard split | 20-yard split | 20-yard shuttle | Three-cone drill | Vertical jump | Broad jump |
|---|---|---|---|---|---|---|---|---|
| 5 ft 10 7/8 in (1.80 m) | 224 lb (102 kg) | 4.60 s | 1.60 s | 2.65 s | 4.13 s | 6.89 s | 30.5 in (0.77 m) | 9 ft 4 in (2.84 m) |
All values from Pro Day

=== San Francisco 49ers ===
Masoli signed with the San Francisco 49ers as an undrafted free agent. He was waived by the team on August 22.

=== Omaha Nighthawks ===
Masoli was drafted in the eighth round of the 2011 UFL draft by the Omaha Nighthawks of the United Football League. On August 25, 2011, Masoli signed with the Nighthawks.

=== Edmonton Eskimos ===
On April 10, 2012, Masoli signed with the Edmonton Eskimos of the Canadian Football League hoping to successfully convert from American football to Canadian football. However, he spent his first season in Edmonton injured.

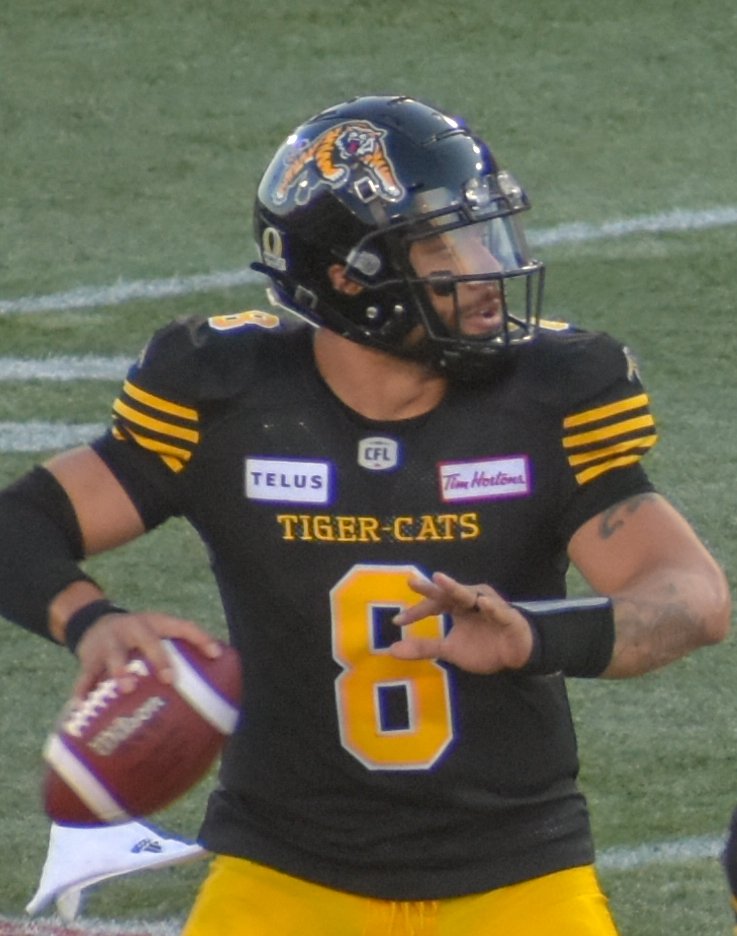
Masoli with the Hamilton Tiger-Cats in 2019

=== Hamilton Tiger-Cats ===
On February 5, 2013, Masoli was traded to the Hamilton Tiger-Cats as part of a five-player trade. He played in both preseason games leading into the 2013 CFL season, completing 6 of 13 attempts for 88 yards with no touchdowns or interceptions. In the 2013 regular season, he played in one game, completing one pass in two attempts for 12 yards and one touchdown. Masoli also rushed for 61 yards in 10 carries.

Masoli made his first CFL start in Week 4 of the 2014 CFL season, against the Calgary Stampeders, replacing the injured Zach Collaros. Masoli struggled and was replaced by Dan LeFevour in the third quarter.

Masoli began the 2015 CFL season as the third quarterback on the depth chart, trailing Zach Collaros and Jeff Mathews. Due to injuries Masoli was tasked with leading the Tiger-Cats in their regular season finale. In his lone regular season contest, Masoli completed 11 of 21 attempts for 148 yards, one touchdown and no interceptions. In the Eastern Semi-Final, Masoli lead the Tiger-Cats over the Toronto Argonauts completing 12 of 18 passes for 141 yards, one touchdown and an interception. In the Eastern Final, Masoli played an exceptional game on the road against the Ottawa Redblacks; completing 30 of 42 pass attempts for 349 yards, two touchdowns (the second with less than 2 minutes remaining in the game) and one interception. Nevertheless, the Tiger-Cats were defeated by the Redblacks 35-28, ending their 2015 season.

Masoli began the 2016 season as the second quarterback behind Zach Collaros, however due to Collaros' continued rehab from his 2015 knee injury head coach Kent Austin announced that Masoli would be the starting quarterback to begin the new season. Masoli lead the Tiger-Cats into the CFL's inaugural game at BMO Field and the 2016 season opener completing 27 of 37 pass attempts for 318 yards, with three touchdowns and no interceptions, en route to a 42–20 victory. On July 23, 2016, Masoli claimed the record for most consecutive completions in a single CFL game against the Edmonton Eskimos (coached by the previous record-holder, Jason Maas), completing 31 of 38 pass attempts, with 23 completions that were consecutive. This also became the largest comeback in the history of the Tiger-Cats, with the team scoring 31 points in the second half to win, 37-31. Collaros returned to the starting lineup for Week 8, relegating Masoli to the backup role, having gone 3-3 as the starter.

Similar to 2016, Masoli began the 2017 season backing up Collaros. The Tiger-Cats struggled mightily in 2017, losing their first eight games of the season resulting in Kent Austin stepping down as head coach to be replaced by June Jones. One of Jones' first moves was to announce Masoli as the Ti-Cats starting quarterback for the foreseeable future. Under Masoli and Jones the Ti-Cats won six of the team's final 10 games. Following the season Masoli and the Ti-Cats announced they had reached a two-year contract extension. In late January 3downnation reported that Masoli's base salary for the 2018 season is $235,000, with incentives it could increase to $325,000. His 2019 salary starts at $325,000 plus $45,000 in performance bonuses.

Heading into 2018, Masoli was named the Ti-Cats starter heading into a season for the first time despite pressure from new acquisition Johnny Manziel. Masoli continued his strong play into the beginning of the 2018 season, throwing for more than 300 yards in the team's first four games, tying the CFL record for most consecutive 300-yards games at 10 (tied with Sam Etcheverry and Kent Austin). He continued to have a strong season and was named a CFL East Division all-star for the first time in his career. Masoli and the Ti-Cats got off to a hot start in 2019, winning four of their first five matches, however, he suffered a torn ACL in the team's Week 7 victory. Masoli was on the injured list for the remainder of the season, including in the team's loss in 107th Grey Cup.

Masoli was expected to remain on the injured list to start the 2020 CFL season, but with the entire year cancelled by the CFL, Masoli was able to fully recover from his injury. He was a pending free agent heading into the 2021 season, but instead chose to sign a contract extension with the Tiger-Cats on January 27, 2021. Masoli spent much of the 2021 season splitting starts with Dane Evans who played well during Masoli's absence during the 2019 season. The Hamilton Tiger Cats were once again defeated in the Grey Cup by the Winnipeg Blue Bombers. Following the season the Tiger-Cats renewed Dane Evans' contract, leaving Masoli to become a free agent on February 8, 2022. In early February, Masoli was rumoured to be gaining considerable interest from both Edmonton and Ottawa.

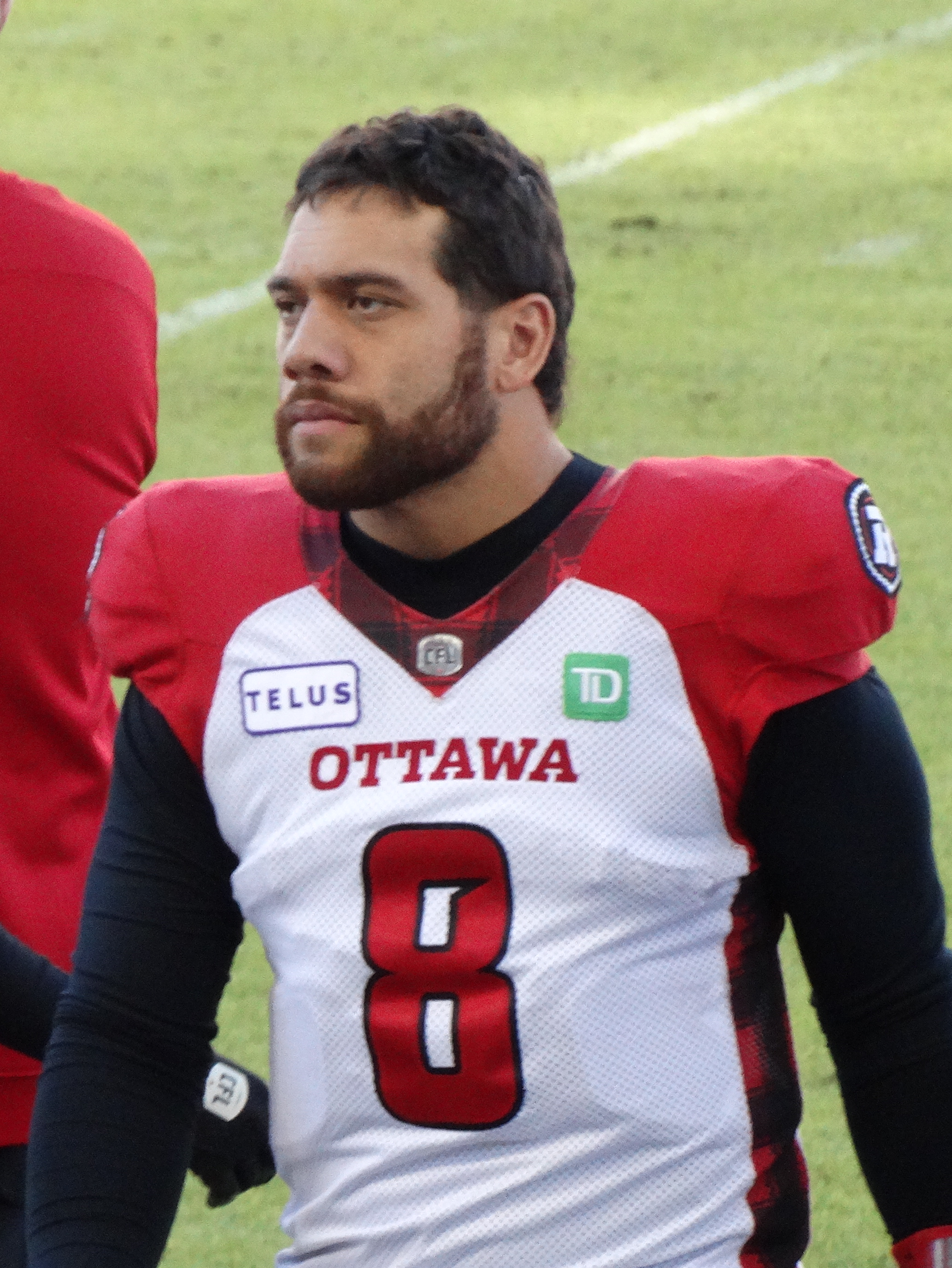
Masoli with the Ottawa Redblacks in 2024

=== Ottawa Redblacks ===
On February 7, 2022, it was announced that Masoli had signed a two-year contract with the Ottawa Redblacks. Masoli and the Redblacks opened the season with four consecutive losses; near the end of their fourth game Masoli was carried off field after low hit by Roughriders defensive lineman Garrett Marino. Marino was ejected from the game and a couple days later it was reveled that Masoli would miss the next 10–12 weeks or longer with a bone related injury in his leg, not a ligament tear as was originally suspected. Masoli ended up missing the remainder of the 2022 season. In late January 2023 Masoli and the Redblacks agreed to a contract restructuring which would pay him an increased bonus salary while providing the team with increased cap space for the 2023 season.

In early June 2023, the Redblacks announced that Masoli would miss at least the first two games of the 2023 season as he continues to recover from his leg injury which he sustained the previous season. He ended up missing the first three games of the season, and was announced as the starting quarterback for the club's Week 5 match against the Hamilton Tiger-Cats. 365 days after his injury in 2022, Masoli return to the starting lineup, however, in the second quarter he suffered a non-contact injury to his left leg and had to be helped off the field by his teammates. A few days later it was announced that he would miss the remainder of the season with a ruptured Achilles. By the time Masoli recovered from his injury in 2024, he was demoted to third-string duties behind Dustin Crum and new signing Dru Brown, though he would eventually be promoted to second-string behind Brown. He became a free agent upon the expiry of his contract on February 11, 2025.

=== BC Lions ===
On February 11, 2025, it was announced that Masoli had signed with the BC Lions. He began the 2025 season as the backup to Nathan Rourke but saw playing time in week 2 after Rourke suffered an injury in the game against the Winnipeg Blue Bombers. Masoli then started the next two games, against the Blue Bombers and Saskatchewan Roughriders where he had a combined 41 completions out of 73 pass attempts for 454 yards with two touchdowns and five interceptions. Rourke returned as the starter in week 5, and afterwards Masoli was demoted to third-string behind Chase Brice while filling short-yardage duties. On February 10, 2026, Masoli became a free agent at the conclusion of his contract with the Lions.

== Career statistics ==
=== CFL ===
==== Regular season ====
| | | Games | | | Passing | | | | | | | Rushing |
| Year | Team | GP | GS | Rec | Comp | Att | Pct | Yards | TD | Int | Rating | Att | Yards | Avg | Long | TD |
|---|---|---|---|---|---|---|---|---|---|---|---|---|---|---|---|---|
| 2013 | HAM | 18 | 0 | 0–0 | 1 | 2 | 50.0 | 12 | 1 | 0 | 108.3 | 10 | 61 | 6.1 | 19 | 0 |
| 2014 | HAM | 18 | 1 | 0–1 | 21 | 45 | 46.7 | 293 | 1 | 3 | 47.7 | 14 | 57 | 4.1 | 25 | 0 |
| 2015 | HAM | 6 | 0 | 0–0 | 11 | 21 | 52.4 | 148 | 1 | 0 | 91.0 | 6 | 27 | 4.5 | 9 | 1 |
| 2016 | HAM | 18 | 8 | 4–4 | 230 | 332 | 69.3 | 2,695 | 15 | 12 | 93.6 | 44 | 180 | 4.1 | 21 | 6 |
| 2017 | HAM | 18 | 10 | 6–4 | 249 | 391 | 63.7 | 3,177 | 15 | 5 | 96.5 | 70 | 446 | 6.4 | 59 | 4 |
| 2018 | HAM | 18 | 17 | 8–9 | 378 | 572 | 66.0 | 5,209 | 28 | 18 | 98.3 | 63 | 473 | 7.5 | 36 | 2 |
| 2019 | HAM | 6 | 6 | 5–1 | 125 | 175 | 71.4 | 1,576 | 9 | 7 | 99.6 | 17 | 79 | 4.5 | 22 | 4 |
| 2020 | HAM | Season cancelled | | | | | | | | Season cancelled |
| 2021 | HAM | 12 | 9 | 4–5 | 188 | 271 | 69.4 | 2,445 | 10 | 6 | 100.6 | 28 | 184 | 6.6 | 26 | 1 |
| 2022 | OTT | 4 | 4 | 0–4 | 84 | 126 | 66.7 | 1,083 | 2 | 2 | 92.1 | 11 | 39 | 3.6 | 8 | 1 |
| 2023 | OTT | 1 | 1 | 0–1 | 6 | 10 | 60.0 | 37 | 0 | 1 | 27.9 | 0 | 0 | 0 | 0 | 0 |
| 2024 | OTT | 12 | 3 | 1–2 | 102 | 150 | 68.0 | 1,149 | 5 | 7 | 82.3 | 6 | 42 | 7.0 | 9 | 0 |
| 2025 | BC | 18 | 2 | 0–2 | 48 | 83 | 57.8 | 538 | 2 | 6 | 55.2 | 16 | 26 | 4.3 | 7 | 3 |
| CFL totals | | 153 | 61 | 28–33 | 1,443 | 2,178 | 66.3 | 18,362 | 89 | 67 | 93.23 | 285 | 1,614 | 5.7 | 59 | 22 |

==== Postseason ====
| Playoffs | | | | Passing | | | | | Rushing | | |
| Year | Game | GP | GS | Att | Cmp | Yards | TD | Int | Att | Yards | TD |
|---|---|---|---|---|---|---|---|---|---|---|---|
| 2012 | *East Semi-Final | 0 | - | - | - | - | - | - | - | - | - |
| 2013 | East Semi-Final | 1 | 0 | 0 | - | - | - | - | 0 | - | - |
| 2013 | East Final | 1 | 0 | 0 | - | - | - | - | 0 | - | - |
| 2014 | East Final | 1 | 0 | 0 | - | - | - | - | 0 | - | - |
| 2015 | East Semi-Final | 1 | 1 | 18 | 12 | 141 | 1 | 1 | 12 | 58 | 1 |
| 2015 | East Final | 1 | 1 | 42 | 30 | 349 | 2 | 1 | 10 | 44 | 1 |
| 2016 | East Semi-Final | 1 | 0 | 1 | 1 | 46 | 0 | 0 | 4 | 6 | 1 |
| 2018 | East Semi-Final | 1 | 1 | 19 | 14 | 259 | 3 | 0 | 1 | 9 | 0 |
| 2018 | East Final | 1 | 1 | 41 | 28 | 315 | 1 | 3 | 1 | 12 | 1 |
| 2019 | East Final | 0 | - | - | - | - | - | - | - | - | - |
| 2021 | East Semi-Final | 1 | 1 | 28 | 18 | 184 | 1 | 0 | 2 | 5 | 0 |
| 2021 | East Final | 1 | 1 | 6 | 4 | 22 | 0 | 0 | 2 | 5 | 0 |
| 2024 | East Semi-Final | 1 | 0 | 0 | - | - | - | - | 0 | - | - |
| CFL totals | | 10 | 6 | 155 | 107 | 1316 | 8 | 5 | 32 | 139 | 4 |

*Team qualified for Crossover

==== Grey Cup ====
| Grey Cup | | | | Passing | | | | | Rushing | | |
| Year | Team | GP | GS | Att | Cmp | Yards | TD | Int | Att | Yards | TD |
|---|---|---|---|---|---|---|---|---|---|---|---|
| 2013 | HAM | 1 | 0 | 0 | - | - | - | - | 0 | - | - |
| 2014 | HAM | 1 | 0 | 0 | - | - | - | - | 0 | - | - |
| 2019 | HAM | 0 | - | - | - | - | - | - | - | - | - |
| 2021 | HAM | 1 | 0 | 25 | 20 | 185 | 2 | 1 | 6 | 35 | 0 |
| CFL totals | | 3 | 0 | 25 | 20 | 185 | 2 | 1 | 6 | 35 | 0 |

=== UFL ===
| Year | Team | Games | | | Passing | | | | | | | | Rushing | | | |
| Year | Team | GP | GS | Record | Cmp | Att | Pct | Yds | Y/A | TD | Int | Rtg | Att | Yds | Avg | TD |
|---|---|---|---|---|---|---|---|---|---|---|---|---|---|---|---|---|
| 2011 | Omaha | 4 | 3 | 1–2 | 77 | 151 | 51.0 | 808 | 5.4 | 2 | 5 | 57.5 | 24 | 94 | 3.9 | 1 |
| Career | | 4 | 3 | 1–2 | 77 | 151 | 51.0 | 808 | 5.4 | 2 | 5 | 57.5 | 24 | 94 | 3.9 | 1 |

=== College ===
| Season | Team | Games | | | Passing | | | | | | | | Rushing | | | |
| Season | Team | GP | GS | Record | Cmp | Att | Pct | Yds | Y/A | TD | Int | Rtg | Att | Yds | Avg | TD |
|---|---|---|---|---|---|---|---|---|---|---|---|---|---|---|---|---|
| 2007 | CCSF | 10 | 10 | 9–1 | 258 | 421 | 61.3 | 3,592 | 8.5 | 30 | 5 | 154.1 | ? | 448 | ? | 11 |
| 2008 | Oregon | 12 | 10 | 7–3 | 136 | 239 | 56.9 | 1,744 | 7.3 | 13 | 5 | 132.0 | 127 | 718 | 5.7 | 10 |
| 2009 | Oregon | 12 | 12 | 9–3 | 177 | 305 | 58.0 | 2,147 | 7.0 | 15 | 6 | 129.5 | 121 | 668 | 5.5 | 13 |
| 2010 | Ole Miss | 12 | 11 | 4–7 | 167 | 296 | 56.4 | 2,039 | 6.9 | 14 | 13 | 121.1 | 121 | 554 | 4.5 | 6 |
| FBS career | | 36 | 33 | 20–13 | 480 | 840 | 57.1 | 5,930 | 7.1 | 42 | 24 | 127.2 | 369 | 1,930 | 5.2 | 29 |

== Awards and honors ==
- 2018 Terry Evanshen Trophy
- 2018 Hamilton Tiger-Cats Most Outstanding Player
- 2018 CFL East All-Star
- 2008 Holiday Bowl MVP
- Pac-10 offensive player of the week for the week of November 21, 2009
- AT&T ESPN All-America Player of the Week for November 21, 2009.

== Legal issues ==
On the morning of January 24, 2010, a member of the Sigma Alpha Epsilon house returned home and witnessed Masoli and teammate Garrett Embry leaving an area of the house near his room. When he realized a projector and two laptop computers were missing he took chase. The victim chased down Embry, who returned the projector and subsequently reported the incident to Eugene police. Police interviewed Masoli the next day, where he said he was not at the fraternity house. On March 12, 2010, Masoli pled guilty to second-degree burglary before Lane County Circuit Judge Maurice Merten, who sentenced Masoli to one year probation and 140 hours of community service. As part of the plea agreement, this charge was later reduced to a misdemeanor. Oregon head coach Chip Kelly immediately suspended Masoli for the 2010 football season, his senior year, but allowed him to remain on the team (he still had a redshirt season available).

On June 7, 2010, Masoli was pulled over by Springfield police for a traffic violation. After inspection Masoli was cited for driving with a suspended license, failure to stop, and possession of one ounce or less of marijuana. Two days later he was dismissed from the team for "failure to adhere to obligations previously outlined". Masoli later entered guilty pleas to both the marijuana and failure to stop charges (both non-criminal violations in Oregon).
