= Nick Reed =

American football player (born 1987)

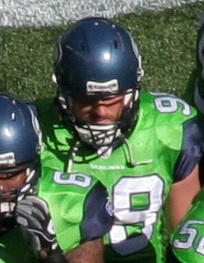
- Reed (#98) with the Seattle Seahawks in 2009

No. 98, 97, 94, 53
- Position: Defensive end

Personal information
- Born: September 1, 1987 (age 39); Oakland, California, U.S.
- Listed height: 6 ft 1 in (1.85 m)
- Listed weight: 247 lb (112 kg)

Career information
- High school: Mission Viejo (Mission Viejo, California)
- College: Oregon
- NFL draft: 2009: 7th round, 247th overall pick

Career history
- Seattle Seahawks (2009); Chicago Bears (2011); Tampa Bay Buccaneers (2011); Minnesota Vikings (2012)*
- * Offseason or practice squad member only

Awards and highlights
- First-team All-American (2008); Third-team All-American (2007); Morris Trophy (2008); 2× First-team All-Pac-10 (2007, 2008)

Career NFL statistics
- Total tackles: 19
- Sacks: 1.0
- Fumble recoveries: 3
- Defensive touchdowns: 1
- Stats at Pro Football Reference

Nicholas Matthew Reed (born September 1, 1987) is an American former professional football player who was a defensive end in the National Football League (NFL). He played college football for the Oregon Ducks.

== Early life ==
As a senior at Mission Viejo High School, Reed was credited with 65 tackles, 10 quarterback sacks and two fumble recoveries as a senior to earn All-Orange County Region by the Los Angeles Times and defensive player of the year accolades by the Orange County Register. He was also honored as First-team All-CIF Southern Section, CIF Southern Section Division II co-defensive player of the year, South Coast League defensive MVP and received votes on the Long Beach Press-Telegram Best in the West balloting.

== College career ==
Reed finished at the University of Oregon with a school-record 29.5 sacks, which ranks fourth in Pac-10 history. His 51.5 tackles behind the line of scrimmage also is a school record. He was also a two-time First-team Academic All-American. Reed was an All-American in 2008 after totaling 53 tackles (35 solo) with 20 going for losses and 13 sacks and forcing two fumbles and leading the nation with five fumble recoveries. He was also one of eight semi-finalists for the Lott Trophy and one of six finalists for the Ted Hendricks Award and was First-team All-Pac-10. In 2007, Reed played in and started all 13 games and had 60 tackles (30 solo) and 22.5 of them being for a loss. He also had 12 sacks and was a Second-team All-American (SI.com) and a First-team All-Pac-10 selection as well as a finalist for the Ted Hendricks Defensive End of the Year Award. In 2006, he played in 13 games and started 10 and had 30 tackles (15 solo) and six went for losses and 3.5 sacks. In 2005, he played in 12 games and totaled 5 tackles, three for losses and one a sack.

== Professional career ==
Reed was selected in the seventh round of the 2009 NFL draft by the Seattle Seahawks with the 247th overall pick. He made the final roster after an impressive performance in his rookie preseason and served primarily as Seattle's situational pass rushing specialist. On October 11, 2009, he returned a fumble forced by defensive end Lawrence Jackson 79 yards for a touchdown against the Jacksonville Jaguars. Reed also recorded his first NFL sack during that game. On September 4, 2010, the Seahawks announced that the team had reached an injury settlement with Reed and that he would be released.

On November 9, 2010, Reed worked out for the Philadelphia Eagles but was not offered a contract. During the week of November 21, 2010, Reed worked out for the Pittsburgh Steelers but was not offered a contract.

On January 20, 2011, Reed signed a futures contract with the Chicago Bears. He made the team's 53-man roster in the final rounds of cuts on 3 September 2011. On November 14, 2011, Reed was waived by the Bears. On December 13, 2011, Reed was signed by the Tampa Bay Buccaneers. On March 22, 2012, Tampa Bay Buccaneers announced the release of Reed along with teammate Tim Crowder.

On May 15, 2012, Reed was signed by the Minnesota Vikings to a 2-year contract. On August 31, 2012, as the Vikings reduced their roster down to league maximum of 53 players, he was released.

== Military career ==
In 2013, Reed enlisted in the United States Airforce and became a B-2 Spirit Aircraft commander and nuclear plans officer for the 393rd Bomb Squadron.
