= 2008 Holiday Bowl =

2008 Pacific Life Holiday Bowl
- Holiday Bowl logo
Oklahoma State Cowboys	Oregon Ducks
(9–3)	(9–3)
Big 12	Pac-10
31	42
Head coach: Mike Gundy	Head coach: Mike Bellotti
AP / Coaches / BCS; 13 / 14 / 13	AP / Coaches / BCS; 15 / 13 / 17
	1	2	3	4	Total
Oklahoma State	17	0	7	7	31
Oregon	7	0	21	14	42
- Date: December 30, 2008
- Season: 2008
- Stadium: Qualcomm Stadium
- Location: San Diego, California
- MVP: QB Jeremiah Masoli, Oregon
- Favorite: OK State by 3 1/2
- Referee: David Witvoet (Big Ten)
- Attendance: 59,106
- Payout: US$2,300,000 per team

United States TV coverage
- Network: ESPN
- Announcers: Chris Fowler, Craig James, Jesse Palmer
- Nielsen ratings: 3.9

The 2008 Pacific Life Holiday Bowl was a college football bowl game played on December 30, 2008, at Qualcomm Stadium in San Diego, California, between the Oklahoma State Cowboys and the Oregon Ducks, and was part of the 2008 NCAA Division I FBS football season and one of the games in the 2008-2009 bowl season to be nationally televised by ESPN. The Ducks won the contest, 42–31.

== Scoring summary ==
=== Scoring summary ===
Scoring Play	Score
1st Quarter
OSU - Dan Bailey 45 yard FG, 10:54	OSU 3–0
OSU - Dez Bryant 33 yard TD pass Zac Robinson (Bailey kick), 4:09	OSU 10–0
Oregon - Jeremiah Johnson 76 yard TD run (Morgan Flint kick), 3:51	OSU 10–7
OSU - Kendall Hunter 3 yard TD run (Bailey kick), 1:03	OSU 17–7
3rd Quarter
Oregon - Jeremiah Masoli 1 yard TD run (Flint kick), 14:15	OSU 17–14
Oregon - Masoli 41 yard TD run (Flint kick), 8:02	Oregon 21–17
OSU - Hunter 4 yard TD run (Bailey kick), 5:08	OSU 24–21
Oregon - Masoli 17 yard TD run (Flint kick), :21	Oregon 28–24
4th Quarter
OSU - Robinson 1 yard TD run (Bailey kick), 12:13	OSU 31–28
Oregon - Jaison Williams 20 yard TD pass from Masoli (Flint kick), 10:26	Oregon 35–31
Oregon - LeGarrette Blount 29 yard TD run (Flint kick), 3:01	Oregon 42–31
