= Nate Costa =

American football player and coach (born 1988)

Biographical details
- Born: May 15, 1988 (age 38); Turlock, California, U.S.

Playing career
- 2006–2010: Oregon
- Position: Quarterback

Coaching career (HC unless noted)
- 2013–2015: Oregon (GA)
- 2017: IMG Academy (OC/QB)
- 2018: UCLA (OA)
- 2019–2021: Oregon (OA)
- 2022: Nevada (QBs)

Nate Costa (born May 15, 1988) played quarterback at the University of Oregon from 2006 to 2010 and was a team captain of the 2010 Oregon Ducks football team. After coaching stops at the University of Oregon and IMG Academy, he was the Quarterback's Coach at University of Nevada for one season before resigning 11 days before the first game of his second season.

== Early years ==
Born in 1988 in Turlock, California, Costa grew up in nearby Hilmar, California. He attended Hilmar High School, where he played quarterback for the football team. As a junior, he had 2,200 yards and 24 touchdowns through the air while rushing for 700 yards and six touchdowns. In his senior year, Costa threw for 2,252 yards and 15 touchdowns, and rushed for 1,709 yards and 18 touchdowns, for a total of 33 touchdowns and 3,961 yards of total offense. He received all-state honors for three consecutive years, and as a senior was selected as the Central Valley player of the year.

Costa was rated by rivals.com as the No. 19 dual-threat quarterback in the country in the recruiting class of 2006. He received scholarship offers from the University of Oregon, University of Iowa, Colorado State University, University of Utah, and Boise State University. Costa committed to Oregon in August 2005, before the start of his senior season.

== Playing career ==
Costa enrolled at the University of Oregon in 2006 and played Quarterback for the Oregon Ducks football team from 2006 to 2010.

=== 2006 season ===
As a true freshman in 2006, he appeared in games against Portland State and USC. He completed all three of his pass attempts against Portland State for 51 yards. Against USC, he completed two passes in two attempts for 22 yards and also rushed for 39 yards on seven carries.

=== 2007 season ===
As a sophomore in 2007, Costa suffered a tear to knee ligaments and did not see action as a redshirt.

=== 2008 season ===
In 2008, Costa was named the Ducks' starting quarterback in the preseason. However, he sustained torn knee ligaments two weeks before the season opener. He underwent the second knee surgery of his college career in the fall of 2008.

=== 2009 & 2010 seasons ===
Costa returned from the injuries and became a key player on Oregon's 2009 and 2010 Pac-10 Conference championship teams. He also played a pivotal role in helping the Oregon Ducks reach the Rose Bowl in 2010. During his time at Oregon, he suffered multiple knee injuries which hindered his development as a player. He is well known by the national media as a player who refused to give up on his dream and battled back from injury multiple times. In 2009 and 2010, he was elected to the Pac-10 All-Academic team. In 2010, he was chosen as a recipient for the Wil Gonyea Award for the Most Inspirational Player on the team. In week 12 of the 2010 season, he was named the Pac-10 Special Teams Player of the Week. In a game against the Arizona Wildcats, Oregon needed a win to keep their Rose Bowl hopes alive. The Ducks mounted a comeback and scored a touchdown to bring the game within 1 point. The snap on the extra point was bad, but Costa recovered quickly and got the ball placed, allowing Morgan Flint to convert the game-tying kick. The Ducks won in overtime. Costa was the first player to ever win the award solely for his work as a holder.

Costa's playing career came to an end in November 2010 when he suffered a knee injury upon being tackled in the third quarter of a 53–16 home win over Washington. Despite the injury, Costa suited up for and hoped to play in the 2011 BCS National Championship Game. Prior to the game, Oregon coach Chip Kelly noted:

"Nate was one of the real leaders of our football team ... He has been rehabbing just like he has done everything in his life, full speed. He is just a great role model for all of our players. ... To have three (ACL injuries), I don't know who would bounce back from that. ... He is a great person where I can point to some young people in our teams that may be down in the dumps or have a sniffle and say, hey, look at him, look how he approaches life. He has been fantastic. We are here because of our leadership, and Nate's one of our best leaders."

When Costa took the field in prior to the national championship game, his appearance resulted in the first loud ovation from Oregon fans. Although he did not play in the game, Costa said, "Just having the opportunity to be with those guys one last time made everything worth it. It's so tough saying goodbye for the last time. I shed a couple tears, not for me, but because this is the last time that I'll be around these guys." The Portland Tribune called Costa "the heart and soul" of the 2010 team that advanced to the national championship game.

== Later years ==
Following his playing career, Costa became a television sports analyst for Comcast SportsNet Northwest in Portland, Oregon.

== Coaching career ==
=== Oregon Ducks (2013-2015) ===
In February 2013, he joined the Oregon Ducks football coaching staff as an Offensive Graduate Assistant coach. Costa primarily worked with the team's Wide Receivers, but he also assisted with the coaching of the Quarterbacks.

=== 2013 Season ===
In his first year of coaching the Ducks football team completed an overall record of 11–2, defeating the University of Texas in the 2013 Alamo Bowl.

=== 2014 Season ===
In Costa's second year of coaching, Oregon beat the Arizona Wildcats in the Pac-12 Championship Game to claim the conference title. This victory resulted in a berth into the inaugural College Football Playoff where Oregon was set to face the Florida State University Seminoles in the Rose Bowl. Oregon was victorious in this game and it catapulted them into National Championship game where they would face off against the Ohio State University Buckeyes. OSU would go on to win the game. The Ducks ended the season with a 13–2 overall record.

=== 2015 Season ===
In his third year of coaching with the Ducks, the team compiled an overall record of 9–4. The team earned an invite to the 2016 Alamo Bowl where they were defeated by the TCU Horned Frogs by a score of 47 to 41.

=== IMG Academy (2017) ===
In January 2017, he joined the IMG Academy Ascenders football team as the Offensive Coordinator & QBs Coach.

=== 2017 Season ===
During the 2017 season the IMG Academy Ascenders completed an undefeated season, winning all 8 of their contests. The team finished the year as the #2 team nationally as ranked by USA Today.

=== 2018 Season ===
During the 2018 season the Bruins compiled an overall record of 3–9, which included a victory over the USC Trojans in the Victory Bell rivalry game.

=== 2019 ===
In May 2019 Costa returned to Oregon as an offensive analyst.

=== Football Camps ===
During the summer Costa participates in football camps in his hometown of Hilmar, CA.
