= 2009 Maaco Bowl Las Vegas =

- 18th Las Vegas Bowl
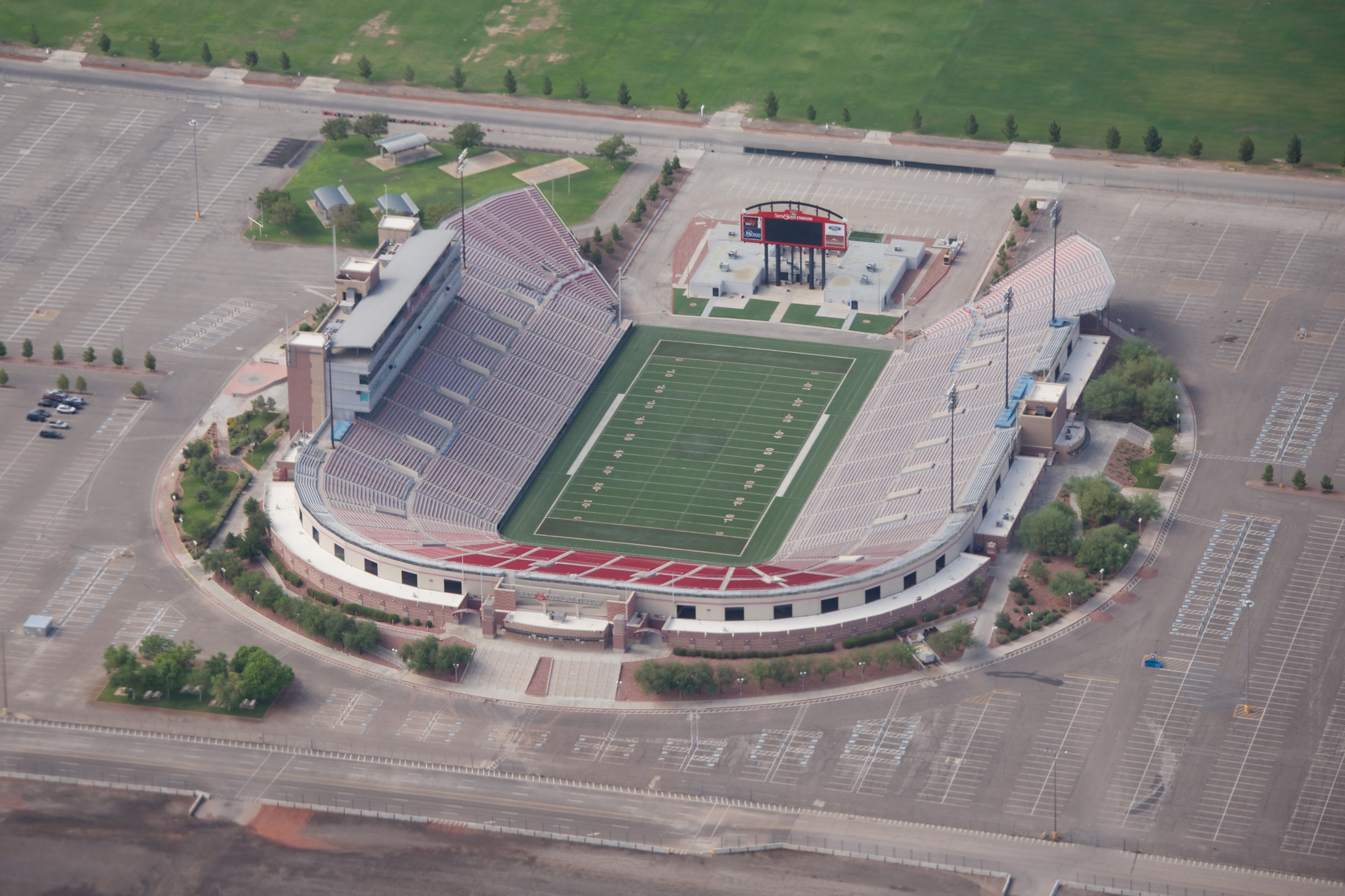
- Sam Boyd Stadium in Whitney, Nevada, hosted the Las Vegas Bowl.
Oregon State Beavers	BYU Cougars
(8–4)	(10–2)
Pac-10	Mountain West
20	44
Head coach: Mike Riley	Head coach: Bronco Mendenhall
AP / Coaches / BCS; 16 / 20 / 18	AP / Coaches / BCS; 15 / 14 / 14
	1	2	3	4	Total
Oregon State	7	0	0	13	20
BYU	14	9	7	14	44
- Date: December 22, 2009
- Season: 2009
- Stadium: Sam Boyd Stadium
- Location: Whitney, Nevada
- MVP: Max Hall (QB BYU)
- Referee: Randy Christal (Big 12)
- Attendance: 40,018
- Payout: US$1,000,000

United States TV coverage
- Network: ESPN
- Announcers: Rece Davis, Lou Holtz and Mark May

The 2009 Maaco Bowl Las Vegas was an NCAA-sanctioned Division I FBS post-season college football bowl game, in which the Brigham Young Cougars defeated the Oregon State Beavers 44–20. The game was played on Tuesday, December 22, 2009, at 5 p.m. PST at 40,000-seat Sam Boyd Stadium, University of Nevada, Las Vegas, in Whitney, Nevada, and was televised on ESPN.

BYU played in the Las Vegas Bowl for the fifth straight year. BYU had gone 2–2 against Pac-10 opponents in the last four Las Vegas Bowls. This was the ninth meeting between the two teams, although the first time they met in this bowl game. Prior to the 2009 Las Vegas Bowl, Oregon State had a 5–3 lead in the series, winning the last meeting 10–7 in 1986. This was the first postseason meeting between the two teams. Bronco Mendenhall, head coach for Brigham Young, is an Oregon State alumnus and it was revealed during the broadcast that he chose Oregon State specifically because Brigham Young did not recruit him and Oregon State had a game with BYU scheduled for the 1986 season. The 2009 game was the first meeting of two ranked teams in the bowl game's history.

== Game summary ==
BYU wore their alternate royal blue jerseys, and OSU wore their away white jerseys.

Weather was a significant factor in the game, with wind gusts up to 50 mph at times. At one point in the game the net used to catch field goals and PAT attempts, blew into the goalpost and became lodged, causing several minutes of delays as the game officials and field workers addressed the problems. ESPN, who was providing television coverage of the game, was forced to take down its Skycam, which traverses above the field, due to safety concerns created by the high winds. Oregon State was also unable to punt very well with the wind. They had 2 punts into the wind which netted 6 yards each.

BYU was led by Senior Quarterback, Max Hall who threw for 192 yards and three touchdowns on his way to being named the bowl's MVP. Harvey Unga was the leading rusher for the Cougars with 76 yards on the ground to go with one rushing touchdown. BYU was also able to shut down the highly touted Rodgers brothers of Oregon State. RB Jacquizz Rodgers who goes by the nickname of Quizz, finished the season with 1,440 yards rushing and 21 touchdowns was held to a season-low 63 yards and a touchdown on 18 carries. His brother James Rodgers, who finished the season with over 1,000 yards receiving, only had 4 catches for 30 yards.

=== Scoring summary ===
Scoring Play	Score
1st Quarter
OSU - Sean Canfield 1 Yd Run (Justin Kahut Kick), 8:46	OSU 7–0
BYU - Harvey Unga 1 Yd Run (Mitch Payne Kick), 2:47	Tie 7–7
BYU - Matt Bauman 34 Yd Fumble Return (Mitch Payne Kick), 1:41	BYU 14–7
2nd Quarter
BYU - Mitch Payne 28 Yd, 9:21	BYU 17–7
BYU - Luke Ashworth 25 Yd Pass From Max Hall (Pat Blocked), 6:22	BYU 23–7
3rd Quarter
BYU - Dennis Pitta 17 Yd Pass From Max Hall (Mitch Payne Kick), 8:51	BYU 30–7
4th Quarter
BYU - Manase Tonga 15 Yd Pass From Max Hall (Mitch Payne Kick), 12:51	BYU 37–7
OSU - Jacquizz Rodgers 1 Yd Run (Pat Failed), 9:00	BYU 37–13
BYU - Manase Tonga 18 Yd Run (Mitch Payne Kick), 3:22	BYU 44–13
OSU - Damola Adeniji 31 Yd Pass From Ryan Katz (Justin Kahut Kick), 2:35	BYU 44–20
