= Jacquizz Rodgers =

American football player (born 1990)

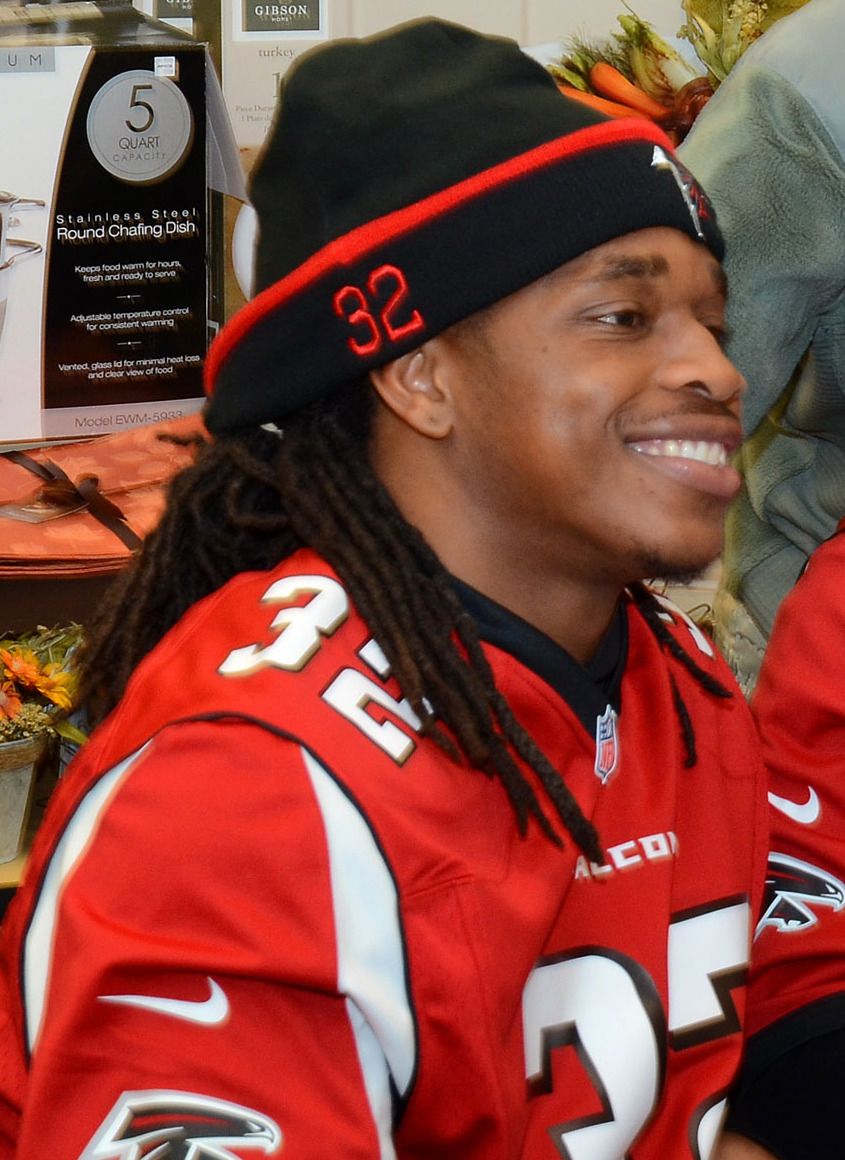
- Rodgers with the Atlanta Falcons in 2014

No. 22, 32, 35
- Position: Running back

Personal information
- Born: February 6, 1990 (age 36); Richmond, Texas, U.S.
- Listed height: 5 ft 6 in (1.68 m)
- Listed weight: 205 lb (93 kg)

Career information
- High school: Lamar Consolidated (Rosenberg, Texas)
- College: Oregon State (2008–2010)
- NFL draft: 2011: 5th round, 145th overall pick

Career history
- Atlanta Falcons (2011–2014); Chicago Bears (2015); Tampa Bay Buccaneers (2016–2018); New Orleans Saints (2019)*
- * Offseason or practice squad member only

Awards and highlights
- Second-team All-American (2009); Pac-10 Offensive Player of the Year (2008); 3× First-team All-Pac-10 (2008–2010); Pac-10 Freshman of the Year (2008)

Career NFL statistics
- Rushing yards: 2,067
- Rushing average: 3.8
- Rushing touchdowns: 9
- Receptions: 216
- Receiving yards: 1,590
- Receiving touchdowns: 5
- Stats at Pro Football Reference

Jacquizz "Quizz" Rodgers (born February 6, 1990) is an American former professional football player who was a running back in the National Football League (NFL). He played college football for the Oregon State Beavers, and was selected by the Atlanta Falcons in the fifth round of the 2011 NFL draft.

== Early life ==
Rodgers attended Lamar Consolidated High School, where he played for the Mustangs football team. He broke out during his sophomore season with 2,278 rushing yards and 34 touchdowns averaging 9.4 yards per carry. In his junior season, he improved with 2,592 rushing yards and 50 touchdowns. As a senior, Rodgers led the Mustangs to the 2007 4A Division 1 State Football Championship. In the state championship, he rushed for 233 yards and three touchdowns on 31 carries, blocked an extra point, recovered a fumble, and had six tackles on defense as the Mustangs won the state title over a Robert Griffin III-led Copperas Cove, 20–14. He finished his senior season with 2,890 rushing yards and 37 touchdowns, as well as 556 yards receiving and five touchdowns. His postseason honors following his senior season included being named the inaugural recipient of the Mr. Texas Football award, the 4A Region III Offensive Player of the Year, first-team all-conference running back and defensive back, second-team all-conference receiver, second-team all-state defensive back, and fourth team all-state running back. He was also named the Built Ford Tough Texas High School Football Player of the Year in Class 4A.

In his high school career, Rodgers amassed 8,246 rushing yards. He set the Texas state record for total touchdowns with 135 touchdowns in four years as a varsity player. His high school career is chronicled in Dr. Brent Melloy's book UNHERALDED: How Jacquizz Rodgers led the 2007 Lamar Consolidated Mustangs to an improbable Texas State Championship.

== College career ==
Rodgers, who received offers from Georgia, Florida, Alabama, Vanderbilt, Oregon, USC, Houston, Baylor, and Tennessee decided to join his older brother James and enroll at Oregon State. Rodgers started out the season second on the depth chart but quickly took over as the starter. Most notably, his best game in his young college football career came in an upset of the then #1 ranked team in the country, the USC Trojans, when he had 36 carries for 186 yards and two touchdowns.

Rodgers broke the Pac-10 freshman rushing record during Oregon State's 34–6 victory over UCLA on November 8, 2008. At the end of the season, he was unable to play in the Civil War against Oregon due to injury and was beaten out by California's Jahvid Best as the 2008 Pac-10 Rushing Leader. He also missed the 2008 Sun Bowl. Rodgers finished the season with 1,253 yards rushing and 11 touchdowns. He was named the 2008 Pac-10 Offensive Player of the Year.

In 2009, Rodgers scored 23 total touchdowns, including one passing and one receiving. He finished the season with over 1,400 yards rushing and 500 yards receiving. After a 38–28 victory over Stanford, he recorded 271 total yards and four touchdowns, he was named Rivals.com Player of the Week and Pac-10 Offensive Player of the Week. In the 2009 Maaco Bowl Las Vegas, he was thrown a backwards lateral, which resulted in the first fumble of his collegiate career. The Beavers lost that game to BYU.

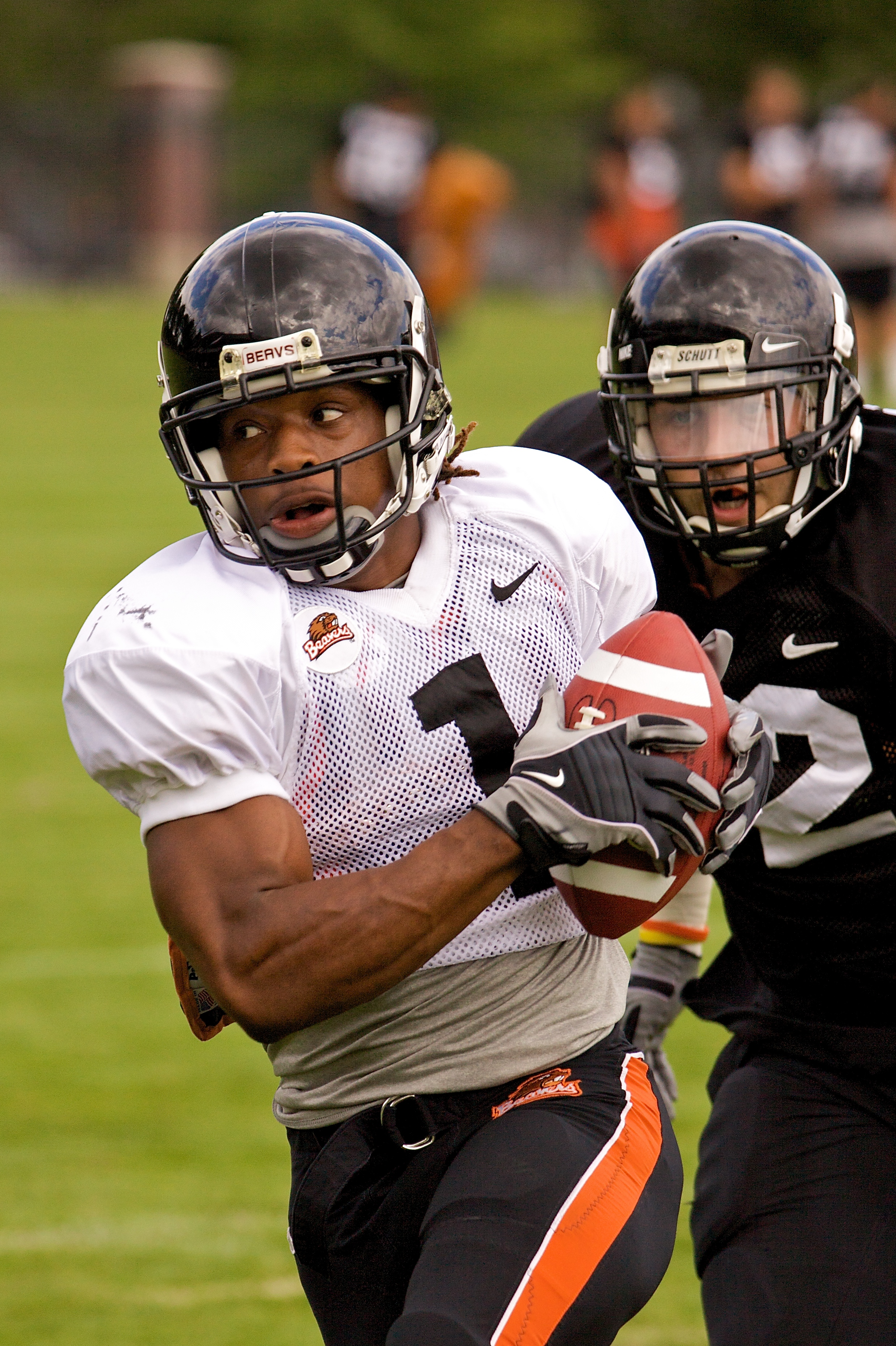
Rodgers during 2009 fall camp at Oregon State.

On September 18, 2010, Rodgers finished with 132 rushing yards, two rushing touchdowns, 22 receiving yards, and a receiving touchdown against Louisville. On October 2, against Arizona State, he had 145 rushing yards and two rushing touchdowns. On October 16, against Washington, he had 140 rushing yards and three rushing touchdowns. On October 30, against California, he had 116 rushing yards and three rushing touchdowns. In the 2010 season, he finished with 1,184 rushing yards, 14 rushing touchdowns, 44 receptions, 287 receiving yards, and three receiving touchdowns.

=== Awards and honors ===
- Pac-10 Offensive Player of the Year (2008)
- Pac-10 Freshman Player of the Year (2008)
- 3× First-team All-Pac-10 (2008–2010)
- 2x AP Third-team All-American (2008, 2009)
- Third all-time in total rushing yards in Beaver football history (3,877 yards)

== Professional career ==
=== Pre-draft ===
On January 10, 2011, Rodgers announced that he would forgo his final year of eligibility and enter the NFL draft. He was originally listed as the number five running back prospect entering the draft by NFL Network's draft specialist, Mike Mayock.

Pre-draft measurables
Height	Weight	Arm length	Hand span	Wingspan	40-yard dash	10-yard split	20-yard split	20-yard shuttle	Three-cone drill	Vertical jump	Broad jump	Bench press
5 ft 5 7/8 in (1.67 m)	196 lb (89 kg)	30 1/2 in (0.77 m)	8 7/8 in (0.23 m)	5 ft 11 1/4 in (1.81 m)	4.52 s	1.58 s	2.61 s	4.26 s	7.31 s	34.0 in (0.86 m)	9 ft 8 in (2.95 m)	13 reps
All values from NFL Combine/Pro Day

=== Atlanta Falcons ===
Rodgers was selected in the fifth round (145th overall) in the 2011 NFL draft by the Atlanta Falcons. He was signed by the Falcons on July 28, 2011. He scored his first touchdown on a reception in 2011 against their NFC South rival Carolina Panthers. In Week 17, Rodgers scored his first career rushing touchdown against divisional rival Tampa Bay. Overall, he finished his rookie season with 205 rushing yards, one rushing touchdown, 21 receptions, 188 receiving yards, and one receiving touchdown. The Falcons made the playoffs with a 10–6 record. In the wild-card round against the New York Giants, he had four receptions for 18 yards in the 24–2 loss.

Rodgers started off the 2012 season with 22 rushing yards, 13 receiving yards, and 104 kick return yards against the Kansas City Chiefs. Overall, he finished the 2012 season with 362 rushing yards, one rushing touchdown, 53 receptions, 402 receiving yards, and one receiving touchdown. The Falcons finished with a 13–3 record and made the playoffs. In the Divisional Round against the Seattle Seahawks, he had 64 rushing yards, eight receiving yards, and 105 kick return yards in the 30–28 victory. In the NFC Championship against the San Francisco 49ers, he had 32 rushing yards in the 28–24 loss.

On October 7, 2013, Rodgers had 43 rushing yards and two rushing touchdowns against the New York Jets. In the 2013 season, he had a career-high 96 rushing attempts for 332 yards as well as total touchdowns with four (two rushing and two receiving).

In the 2014 season opener against the New Orleans Saints, Rodgers had 34 rushing yards and a rushing touchdown. Overall, in the 2014 season, he finished with 217 rushing yards, one rushing touchdown, 29 receptions, 173 receiving yards, and one receiving touchdown.

=== Chicago Bears ===
On March 31, 2015, the Chicago Bears signed Rodgers to a one-year contract. On October 12, 2015, Rodgers was placed on injured reserve after breaking his arm in the Bears' 18–17 victory over the Kansas City Chiefs. In the 2015 season, he finished with 41 rushing yards on 14 carries.

On March 9, 2016, Rodgers re-signed with the Bears on a one-year contract. He was released by the Bears on September 3, 2016.

=== Tampa Bay Buccaneers ===
On September 13, 2016, Rodgers signed with the Tampa Bay Buccaneers. On October 10, Rodgers had a career-high 30 carries for 101 yards on Monday Night Football helping the Buccaneers defeat the defending NFC Champion Carolina Panthers, 17–14. Two weeks later, he rushed 26 times for a career-high 154 yards in a victory over the San Francisco 49ers. In Week 16, against the New Orleans Saints, he was named starter after Doug Martin was made a healthy scratch, rushing 15 times for 63 yards and a touchdown. Rodgers finished the 2016 season with a career-high 129 carries for 560 yards and two touchdowns in 10 games played.

On March 9, 2017, Rodgers signed a two-year contract extension with the Buccaneers. On September 17, against the Chicago Bears, he had 67 rushing yards and a touchdown in the 29–7 victory. Overall, he finished the 2017 season with 244 rushing yards, one rushing touchdown, and nine receptions for 74 yards.

In the 2018 season, Rodgers finished with 33 carries for 106 rushing yards, one rushing touchdown, and 38 receptions for 304 receiving yards.

=== New Orleans Saints ===
Rodgers signed with the New Orleans Saints on August 3, 2019. He was released during final roster cuts on August 30, 2019.

== Career statistics ==
=== NFL ===
Year	Team	Games		Rushing					Receiving					Fumbles	
Year	Team	GP	GS	Att	Yds	Avg	Lng	TD	Rec	Yds	Avg	Lng	TD	Fum	Lost
2011	ATL	16	0	57	205	3.6	13	1	21	188	9.0	31	1	1	1
2012	ATL	16	0	94	362	3.9	43	1	53	402	7.6	32	1	0	0
2013	ATL	15	4	96	332	3.5	19	2	52	341	6.6	22	2	1	1
2014	ATL	16	1	58	217	3.7	17	1	29	173	6.0	14	1	1	0
2015	CHI	5	0	14	41	2.9	5	0	1	10	10.0	10	0	0	0
2016	TB	10	5	129	560	4.3	45	2	13	98	7.5	21	0	0	0
2017	TB	16	4	64	244	3.8	36	1	9	74	8.2	15	0	0	0
2018	TB	16	0	33	106	3.2	20	1	38	304	8.0	24	0	1	0
Total		110	14	545	2,067	3.8	45	9	216	1,590	7.4	32	5	4	2

=== College ===
Year	Team	Att.	Yds.	Avg.	TD	Rec.	Yds.	TD
2008	Oregon State	259	1,253	4.8	11	29	247	1
2009	Oregon State	273	1,440	5.3	21	78	522	1
2010	Oregon State	256	1,184	4.6	14	44	287	3
Career		788	3,877	4.9	46	151	1,056	5

== Personal life ==
Rodgers is the nephew of former All-Pro safety Michael Lewis. His older brother, James Rodgers, was a wide receiver for the Atlanta Falcons and the Montreal Alouettes of the Canadian Football League (CFL).
