= 2009 Oregon State Beavers football team =

American college football season

2009 Oregon State Beavers football

Maaco Bowl Las Vegas, L 20–44 vs. BYU
- Conference: Pacific-10 Conference
- Record: 8–5 (6–3 Pac-10)
- Head coach: Mike Riley (9th season)
- Offensive coordinator: Danny Langsdorf (5th season)
- Offensive scheme: Multiple
- Defensive coordinator: Mark Banker (7th season)
- Base defense: 4–3
- Home stadium: Reser Stadium

2009 Pacific-10 Conference football standings
| | Conf. | | | Overall |
| Team | W | | L | W | | L |
|---|---|---|---|---|---|---|
| No. 11 Oregon $ | 8 | – | 1 | 10 | – | 3 |
| Arizona | 6 | – | 3 | 8 | – | 5 |
| Oregon State | 6 | – | 3 | 8 | – | 5 |
| Stanford | 6 | – | 3 | 8 | – | 5 |
| No. 22 USC | 5 | – | 4 | 9 | – | 4 |
| California | 5 | – | 4 | 8 | – | 5 |
| Washington | 4 | – | 5 | 5 | – | 7 |
| UCLA | 3 | – | 6 | 7 | – | 6 |
| Arizona State | 2 | – | 7 | 4 | – | 8 |
| Washington State | 0 | – | 9 | 1 | – | 11 |
$ – BCS representative as conference champion; Rankings from AP Poll

The 2009 Oregon State Beavers football team represented Oregon State University in the 2009 NCAA Division I FBS football season. The team's head coach was Mike Riley, in his seventh straight season and ninth overall. Home games were played on campus at Reser Stadium in Corvallis. The Beavers finished the season 8–5, 6–3 in Pac-10 play, and lost the Maaco Bowl Las Vegas 20–44 vs BYU.

== Schedule ==
| Date | Time | Opponent | Rank | Site | TV | Result | Attendance |
|---|---|---|---|---|---|---|---|
| September 5 | 11:30 am | Portland State* | | Reser Stadium; Corvallis, Oregon | FSNNW | W 34–7 | 41,679 |
| September 12 | 8:00 pm | at UNLV* | | Sam Boyd Stadium; Whitney, Nevada | CBSCS | W 23–21 | 25,967 |
| September 19 | 3:45 pm | No. 17 Cincinnati* | | Reser Stadium; Corvallis, Oregon | FSN | L 18–28 | 41,909 |
| September 26 | 4:35 pm | Arizona | | Reser Stadium; Corvallis, Oregon | Versus | L 32–37 | 42,119 |
| October 3 | 4:00 pm | at Arizona State | | Sun Devil Stadium; Tempe, Arizona | Versus | W 28–17 | 45,373 |
| October 10 | 4:00 pm | Stanford | | Reser Stadium; Corvallis, Oregon | FSN | W 38–28 | 41,979 |
| October 24 | 5:00 pm | at No. 7 USC | | Los Angeles Memorial Coliseum; Los Angeles | ABC | L 36–42 | 89,718 |
| October 31 | 1:00 pm | UCLA^{†} | | Reser Stadium; Corvallis, Oregon | | W 26–19 | 41,009 |
| November 7 | 4:00 pm | at No. 20 California | | California Memorial Stadium; Berkeley, California | FSN | W 31–14 | 56,496 |
| November 14 | 12:30 pm | Washington | No. 23 | Reser Stadium; Corvallis, Oregon | FSN | W 48–21 | 45,274 |
| November 21 | 2:00 pm | at Washington State | No. 19 | Martin Stadium; Pullman, Washington | | W 42–10 | 16,167 |
| December 3 | 6:00 pm | at No. 7 Oregon | No. 16 | Autzen Stadium; Eugene, Oregon (Civil War) | ESPN | L 33–37 | 59,597 |
| December 22 | 5:00 pm | vs. No. 14 BYU* | No. 20 | Sam Boyd Stadium; Whitney, Nevada (Maaco Bowl Las Vegas) | ESPN | L 20–44 | 40,018 |
*Non-conference game; ^{†}Homecoming; Rankings from AP Poll and BCS Rankings after October 18 released prior to game; All times are in Pacific time

== Roster ==
2009 Oregon State Beavers
| Centers: 60 Alex Linnenkohl; 70 Grant Johnson; Cornerbacks: 2 David Ross; 3 Patrick Henderson; 4 James Dockery; 6 Sean Martin; 14 Kaua Olds; 16 Rasheed Reynolds; 17 Brandon Hardin; 20 Keynan Parker; 21 Tim Clark; 38 Brian Watkins; Defensive ends: 19 Matt LaGrone; 41 Kevin Unga; 49 Andrew Seumalo; 55 Ben Terry; 66 Mana Rosa; 74 Kevin Frahm; 90 Tom Black; 91 Taylor Henry; 99 Gabe Miller; Defensive line: 61 Tonu Tuimalealiifano; 65 Travis Horton; 77 Evan Hull; Defensive tackles: 54 Stephen Paea; 78 Brennan Olander; 92 Mitchel Hunt; 95 Latu Moala; 96 Jesse Fafita; 97 Sioeli Nau; 98 Castro Masaniai | Linebackers: 13 Reuben Robinson; 15 Michael Doctor; 29 Zane Norris; 31 Paul Jones; 32 Keaton Kristick; 35 Keith Pankey; 39 Kameron Krebs; 43 Tony Wilson; 44 Devan Unga; 45 David Pa'aluhi III; 48 Walker Vave; 52 Keo Camat; 59 Dwight Roberson; Long snappers: 57 Marcus Perry; 58 Tyler Bills; Offensive guards: 51 Brent McNeil; 53 Colin Lyons; 61 Michael Lamb; 63 Ryan Pohl; 73 Gregg Peat; Offensive linemen: 56 Thomas Tyler; 62 Geoff Garner; 67 Rory Ross; 69 Joshua Andrews; 71 Grant Enger; 74 Burke Ellis; 75 Nathan Hannah; 76 John Braun; 77 Michael Philip; 78 Ben Motter; 79 Aaron Magnuson | Offensive tackles: 50 Mike Remmers; 64 Colin Kelly; 68 Wilder McAndrews; 72 Timi Oshinowo; Punters: 7 Johnny Hekker; 37 Ryan Allen; Place kickers: 27 Justin Kahut; 40 Matt Barker; Quarterbacks: 3 Lyle Moevao; 5 Sean Canfield; 7 Peter Lalich; 12 Ryan Katz; 14 Cody Vaz; 16 Justin Engstrom; 17 Jack Lomax; Running backs: 1 Jacquizz Rodgers; 19 Jovan Stevenson; 22 Ashton Jefferson; 24 Ryan McCants; 26 Josh Parish; 33 Will Darkins; 34 Jordan Jenkins; 36 Dylan Parsons; 42 Clayton York | Safeties: 5 Cameron Collins; 10 Lance Mitchell; 12 Dax Dilbeck; 14 Jordan Poyer; 15 Levi Lavasa; 26 Josh LaGrone; 28 Suaesi Tuimaunei; 30 Zeke Sanders; 47 Anthony Watkins; Tight ends: 82 Colby Prince; 83 Brady Camp; 85 John Reese; 87 Joe Halahuni; 88 Howard Croom; 94 Devon Kell; Wide receivers: 2 Markus Wheaton; 4 Kaulin Krebs; 8 James Rodgers; 10 Kevan Walker; 15 Darrell Catchings; 18 Geno Munoz; 21 Mitch Singler; 23 Jordan Bishop; 25 Casey Kjos; 40 Garrett Hall; 46 Aaron Nichols; 80 Damola Adenjii; 81 Micah Hatfield; 84 Taylor Kavanaugh; 86 Kyle Brown; 89 Shawn McGarity |

== Game summaries ==
=== Portland State ===
| | 1 | 2 | 3 | 4 | Total |
|---|---|---|---|---|---|
| Vikings | 0 | 0 | 0 | 7 | 7 |
| Beavers | 14 | 10 | 10 | 0 | 34 |

at Reser Stadium, Corvallis, Oregon

- Game time: 2:30 p.m. EDT
- Game weather: 60 °F (16 °C) (Overcast)
- Game attendance: 41,679
- TV Coverage: FSN Northwest

Oregon State faced Portland State for the third time in history, first since 2005, which the Beavers won 41–14. The Beavers also won the first meeting in 1983, 51–14.

Behind the legs of Jacquizz Rodgers, the Beavers thumped the in-state Vikings 34–7. Oregon State scored on their first play from scrimmage, an 87-yard touchdown from Sean Canfield to James Rodgers. Quizz ran for 103 yards and three touchdowns.

| | Time | Scoring Team | Scoring Player | Yards of Score | PAT | Score | |
| | Time | Scoring Team | Scoring Player | Yards of Score | PAT | ORST | PSU |
|---|---|---|---|---|---|---|---|
| Q1 | 9:26 | Oregon State | Sean Canfield to James Rodgers | 87-yard pass | Justin Kahut kick | 7 | 0 |
| Q1 | 5:35 | Oregon State | Jacquizz Rodgers | 5-yard run | Justin Kahut kick | 14 | 0 |
| Q2 | 13:05 | Oregon State | Justin Kahut | 50-yard FG | | 17 | 0 |
| Q2 | 1:59 | Oregon State | Jacquizz Rodgers | 1-yard run | Justin Kahut kick | 24 | 0 |
| Q3 | 14:42 | Oregon State | Jacquizz Rodgers | 43-yard run | Justin Kahut kick | 31 | 0 |
| Q3 | 1:34 | Oregon State | Justin Kahut | 24-yard FG | | 34 | 0 |
| Q4 | 2:51 | Portland State | Connor Kavanaugh | 1-yard run | Robert Truax kick | 34 | 7 |

=== UNLV ===
| | 1 | 2 | 3 | 4 | Total |
|---|---|---|---|---|---|
| Beavers | 0 | 6 | 14 | 3 | 23 |
| Rebels | 0 | 0 | 7 | 14 | 21 |

The fifth all-time meeting between Oregon State and UNLV will be an early road test for the Beavers. The Rebels own the series between the two, 3–1. The last time the two teams met was in 2002, in which Oregon State won 47–17.

Jacquizz Rodgers ran for 166 yards and a score and also led the team in receiving with 10 catches for 65 yards. UNLV led a 4th Quarter rally in which they went from being down 20–7 to up 21–20. Sean Canfield then executed a 2-minute drill (helped by a pass interference call on 3rd and 26) that set up the winning 33-yard field goal by Justin Kahut. The win was Mike Riley's first road win in the month of September.

| | Time | Scoring Team | Scoring Player | Yards of Score | PAT | Score | |
| | Time | Scoring Team | Scoring Player | Yards of Score | PAT | ORST | UNLV |
|---|---|---|---|---|---|---|---|
| Q2 | 1:04 | Oregon State | Sean Canfield to Brady Camp | 1-yard pass | Justin Kahut kick failed | 6 | 0 |
| Q3 | 13:07 | Oregon State | Jacquizz Rodgers | 2-yard run | Justin Kahut kick | 13 | 0 |
| Q3 | 10:42 | UNLV | Omar Clayton to Rodelin Anthony | 19-yard pass | Kyle Watson kick | 13 | 7 |
| Q3 | 7:17 | Oregon State | Sean Canfield to James Rodgers | 4-yard pass | Justin Kahut kick | 20 | 7 |
| Q4 | 10:40 | UNLV | Mike Clausen to Rodelin Anthony | 13-yard pass | Kyle Watson kick | 20 | 14 |
| Q4 | 4:16 | UNLV | Mike Clausen to Phillip Payne | 10-yard pass | Kyle Watson kick | 20 | 21 |
| Q4 | 0:07 | Oregon State | Justin Kahut | 33-yard FG | | 23 | 21 |

=== Cincinnati ===
| | 1 | 2 | 3 | 4 | Total |
|---|---|---|---|---|---|
| Bearcats | 0 | 21 | 0 | 7 | 28 |
| Beavers | 6 | 2 | 7 | 3 | 18 |

In 2007, Oregon State traveled to Cincinnati and turned the ball over 7 times in the Bearcats 34–3 victory. In next game the Bearcats come to Reser. This game will be a signature game early in the season for both teams.

| | Time | Scoring Team | Scoring Player | Yards of Score | PAT | Score | |
| | Time | Scoring Team | Scoring Player | Yards of Score | PAT | ORST | CIN |
|---|---|---|---|---|---|---|---|
| Q1 | 12:13 | Oregon State | Justin Kahut | 46-yard FG | | 3 | 0 |
| Q1 | 6:11 | Oregon State | Justin Kahut | 39-yard FG | | 6 | 0 |
| Q2 | 14:27 | Cincinnati | Tony Pike | 7-yard run | Jake Rogers kick | 6 | 7 |
| Q2 | 12:13 | Oregon State | Matt LaGrone | 1 yard safety | | 8 | 7 |
| Q2 | 6:40 | Cincinnati | Isaiah Pead | 1-yard run | Jake Rogers kick | 8 | 14 |
| Q2 | 0:18 | Cincinnati | Tony Pike to D.J. Woods | 45-yard pass | Jake Rogers kick | 8 | 21 |
| Q3 | 12:36 | Oregon State | Jacquizz Rodgers | 9-yard run | Justin Kahut kick | 15 | 21 |
| Q4 | 13:22 | Oregon State | Justin Kahut | 23-yard FG | | 18 | 21 |
| Q4 | 8:03 | Cincinnati | Tony Pike to Marshawn Gilyard | 19-yard pass | Jake Rogers kick | 18 | 28 |

=== Arizona ===
| | 1 | 2 | 3 | 4 | Total |
|---|---|---|---|---|---|
| Wildcats | 7 | 7 | 14 | 9 | 37 |
| Beavers | 10 | 7 | 0 | 15 | 32 |

Once upon a time, the Wildcats owned Oregon State. They won 19 of 22 from 1966 to 1998. But those days are gone. Since 1999, the Beavers have won 9 of 10, including last season's 19–17 effort in Tucson.

| | Time | Team | Scoring Player | Yards of Score | PAT | Score | |
| | Time | Team | Scoring Player | Yards of Score | PAT | ORST | ARZ |
|---|---|---|---|---|---|---|---|
| Q1 | 6:25 | Arizona | Nick Foles to Delashaun Dean | 2-yard pass | Alex Zendejas kick | 0 | 7 |
| Q1 | 0:02 | Oregon State | Sean Canfield to Damola Adeniji | 11 yard Pass | Justin Kahut kick | 7 | 7 |
| Q2 | 8:25 | Oregon State | Jacquizz Rodgers | 1-yard run | Justin Kahut kick | 14 | 7 |
| Q2 | 3:39 | Arizona | Greg Nwoko | 19-yard run | Alex Zendejas kick | 14 | 14 |
| Q2 | 0:00 | Oregon State | Justin Kahut | 22-yard FG | | 17 | 14 |
| Q3 | 6:21 | Arizona | Nick Foles | 1-yard run | Alex Zendejas kick | 17 | 21 |
| Q3 | 1:48 | Arizona | Nick Foles to Juron Criner | 3-yard pass | Alex Zendejas kick | 17 | 28 |
| Q4 | 13:44 | Oregon State | Jacquizz Rodgers | 2-yard run | James Rodgers rush | 25 | 28 |
| Q4 | 8:08 | Arizona | Nick Foles to Terell Turner | 13-yard pass | Alex Zendejas kick | 25 | 35 |
| Q4 | 4:09 | Oregon State | Sean Canfield to Aaron Nichols | 13-yard pass | Justin Kahut kick | 32 | 35 |
| Q4 | 0:25 | Arizona | Earl Mitchell and D'Aundre Reed | 3 yard safety | | 32 | 37 |

=== Arizona State ===
| | 1 | 2 | 3 | 4 | Total |
|---|---|---|---|---|---|
| Beavers | 14 | 7 | 0 | 7 | 28 |
| Sun Devils | 3 | 0 | 7 | 7 | 17 |

The Beavers haven't won at Tempe since 1969, a span of 16 games. They will be looking to break the streak as the Beavers face the Sun Devils and former coach, Dennis Erickson. The Beavers got hot early and the Sun Devils were never able to recover. An early miscue by the Sun Devils punter, gave Oregon State the ball on the Arizona State 17. A few plays and Jacquizz Rodgers punched it in. Another stop by the Beavs defense resulted in another punt, this one got off cleanly. A great return by James Rodgers set up a nice 32-yard rush by Quizz for another touchdown. ASU drove down the field and was forced to settle for a short field goal. The Beavers third score came on an amazing 25-yard reception from Canfield to Rodgers. James juggled it for the first nine yards in the endzone, but recovered in time to get his foot in the last yard for the score. Arizona State came out pretty sharp as they scored on their first possession. The Beavs came out and scored on a drive with three huge plays. Most notably a long pass to James Rodgers which set up an easy score from Sean Canfield to Damola Adeniji from the 2. Arizona took too long on their next drive, trailing 28–10. It took them over 6 minutes as they finally scored with :11 seconds left. A Sun Devil failed onside kick gave the Beavers the ball. Canfield took the kneeldown and the Beavs got their first win in Tempe in 40 years.

| | Time | Team | Scoring Player | Yards of Score | PAT | Score | |
|---|---|---|---|---|---|---|---|
| Q1 | 10:15 | Oregon State | Jacquizz Rodgers | 1-yard run | Justin Kahut kick | 7 | 0 |
| Q1 | 8:38 | Oregon State | Jacquizz Rodgers | 32-yard run | Justin Kahut kick | 14 | 0 |
| Q1 | 4:09 | Arizona State | Bobby Wenzig | 35-yard FG | | 14 | 3 |
| Q2 | 14:53 | Oregon State | Sean Canfield to James Rodgers | 25-yard pass | Justin Kahut kick | 21 | 3 |
| Q3 | 10:10 | Arizona State | Dimitri Nance | 1-yard run | Bobby Wenzig kick | 21 | 10 |
| Q4 | 7:07 | Oregon State | Sean Canfield to Damola Adniji | 2-yard run | Justin Kahut kick | 28 | 10 |
| Q4 | 0:11 | Arizona State | Danny Sullivan to Kyle Williams | 12-yard pass | Bobby Wenzig kick | 28 | 17 |

=== Stanford ===
| | 1 | 2 | 3 | 4 | Total |
|---|---|---|---|---|---|
| Cardinal | 0 | 7 | 7 | 14 | 28 |
| Beavers | 14 | 17 | 0 | 7 | 38 |

Stanford shocked the Beavers in the opening game of the season last year. A late OSU rally came up short when WR Darell Catchings fumbles out of the end zone for a touchback while trying to extend for a touchdown. The Cardinal won the game 36–28.

Oregon State jumped to a quick start as Jacquizz Rodgers scored the first three touchdowns in the game, giving the Beavers a 21–0 lead early in the 2nd quarter. Witt the Beavers up by 24 at the half, Stanford had to focus on moving the ball quickly with the passing game, which took running back Toby Gerhart out of the spotlight. The Beavers won 38–28.

| | Time | Scoring Team | Scoring Player | Yards of Score | PAT | Score | |
| | Time | Scoring Team | Scoring Player | Yards of Score | PAT | ORST | STAN |
|---|---|---|---|---|---|---|---|
| Q1 | 10:11 | Oregon State | Jacquizz Rodgers | 7-yard run | Justin Kahut kick | 7 | 0 |
| Q1 | 2:00 | Oregon State | Jacquizz Rodgers | 12-yard run | Justin Kahut kick | 14 | 0 |
| Q2 | 9:56 | Oregon State | Jacquizz Rodgers | 2-yard run | Justin Kahut kick | 21 | 0 |
| Q2 | 7:14 | Stanford | Andrew Luck to Chris Owusu | 21-yard pass | Nate Whitaker kick | 21 | 7 |
| Q2 | 4:32 | Oregon State | Sean Canfield to James Rodgers | 16-yard pass | Justin Kahut kick | 28 | 7 |
| Q2 | 0:00 | Oregon State | Justin Kahut | 31-yard FG | | 31 | 7 |
| Q3 | 7:04 | Stanford | Andrew Luck to Jim Dray | 7-yard pass | Nate Whitaker kick | 31 | 14 |
| Q4 | 14:54 | Oregon State | Jacquizz Rodgers | 5-yard run | Justin Kahut kick | 38 | 14 |
| Q4 | 9:12 | Stanford | Toby Gerhart | 11-yard run | Toby Gerhart run for Two-Point Conversion | 38 | 22 |
| Q4 | 0:25 | Stanford | Toby Gerhart | 2-yard run | Two-Point pass Conversion Failed | 38 | 28 |

=== USC ===
| | 1 | 2 | 3 | 4 | Total |
|---|---|---|---|---|---|
| Beavers | 6 | 3 | 14 | 13 | 36 |
| Trojans | 7 | 14 | 14 | 7 | 42 |

In 2008, the #1 Trojans came to Corvallis and were upset 27–21. It was the second straight trip to Corvallis for USC that resulted in defeat. JacQuizz Rodgers ran for 187 yards on 37 carries and two touchdowns in the win. Oregon State is the second Pac-10 Conference school to have beaten USC twice during the Pete Carroll era, having done so in 2006 and 2008 (Stanford was first with victories in 2001 and 2007 and would do so again later in the 2009 season).

The last time Oregon State won against USC in the Coliseum was when Dwight D. Eisenhower was the President of the United States.

USC quarterback Matt Barkley passed to Anthony McCoy for an 8-yard touchdown to give the Trojans the early lead in the first quarter. The Beavers got on the scoreboard with two field goal kicks from Justin Kahut (both 48 yards). In the second quarter, Matt Barkley completed a pass to Ronald Johnson for a 22 yards touchdown. On second and goal, Barkley rushed for a 1-yard touchdown for the Trojans. Kahut kicked a 33-yard field goal for Oregon State just before the half.

In the third quarter, Sean Canfield passed to Jacquizz Rodgers for a 6-yard touchdown for the Beavers on a 3:06-drive that took 8 plays for 61 yards. The Trojans countered with a 7-play drive for 70 yards with Allen Bradford rushing for 2 yards for a touchdown. Canfield narrowed Oregon State's gap by completing a 15-yard scoring pass to Damola Adeniji. USC answered with Allen Bradford scoring a 43-yard touchdown.

Oregon State became the first team to score more than 10 points on the Trojans in their last ten home games (though Stanford and Arizona would both do so in their victories over USC in the Coliseum later in the season, with 55 points and 21 points, respectively).

| | Time | Scoring Team | Scoring Player | Yards of Score | PAT | Score | |
| | Time | Scoring Team | Scoring Player | Yards of Score | PAT | ORST | USC |
|---|---|---|---|---|---|---|---|
| Q1 | 9:49 | USC | Matt Barkley to Anthony McCoy | 8-yard pass | Jordan Congdon kick | 0 | 7 |
| Q1 | 5:06 | Oregon State | Justin Kahut | 48-yard FG | | 3 | 7 |
| Q1 | 1:57 | Oregon State | Justin Kahut | 48-yard FG | | 6 | 7 |
| Q2 | 12:53 | USC | Matt Barkley to Ronald Johnson | 22-yard pass | Jordan Congdon kick | 6 | 14 |
| Q2 | 2:15 | USC | Matt Barkley | 1-yard run | Jordan Congdon kick | 6 | 21 |
| Q2 | 0:05 | Oregon State | Justin Kahut | 33-yard FG | | 9 | 21 |
| Q3 | 10:26 | Oregon State | Sean Canfield to Jacquizz Rodgers | 6-yard pass | Justin Kahut kick | 16 | 21 |
| Q3 | 6:34 | USC | Allen Bradford | 2-yard run | Jordan Congdon kick | 16 | 28 |
| Q3 | 3:18 | Oregon State | Sean Canfield to Damola Adeniji | 15-yard pass | Justin Kahut kick | 23 | 28 |
| Q3 | 0:42 | USC | Allen Bradford | 43-yard run | Jordan Congdon kick | 23 | 35 |
| Q4 | 14:05 | USC | Damian Williams | 63-yard punt return | Jordan Congdon kick | 23 | 42 |
| Q4 | 12:07 | Oregon State | Sean Canfield to James Rodgers | 7-yard pass | Two-Point pass Conversion Failed | 29 | 42 |
| Q4 | 5:41 | Oregon State | Jacquizz Rodgers | 1-yard run | Justin Kahut kick | 36 | 42 |

=== UCLA ===
| | 1 | 2 | 3 | 4 | Total |
|---|---|---|---|---|---|
| Bruins | 0 | 0 | 3 | 16 | 19 |
| Beavers | 3 | 13 | 0 | 10 | 26 |

Justin Kahut kicked two field goals, 48 yards and 42 yards, to give the Beavers a 6-point lead. Oregon State increased its lead to 13 when Jacquizz Rodgers passed to Brady Camp for a 14-yard touchdown. Kahut's third field goal gave the Beavers a 16–0 lead at the half.

In the third quarter, Kai Forbath kicked a 24-yard field goal for the Bruins. Kahut kicked his fourth field goal (31 yards) in the fourth quarter to give the Beavers a 19–3 lead. A 58-yard pass to Nelson Rosario from Kevin Prince, combined with a 2-point conversion to Rosario, put UCLA back in the game, behind by only 8 points. Then Taylor Embree caught a touchdown pass from Prince and Johnathan Franklin caught a conversion pass to tie the game for the Bruins with 2 minutes left. But James Rodgers ran into the end zone for an Oregon State touchdown on a drive of 7 plays and 70 yards. UCLA took over the ball with 44 seconds remaining in the game and failed to make a complete comeback, losing their fifth game in a row.

| | Time | Scoring Team | Scoring Player | Yards of Score | PAT | Score | |
| | Time | Scoring Team | Scoring Player | Yards of Score | PAT | ORST | UCLA |
|---|---|---|---|---|---|---|---|
| Q1 | 10:35 | Oregon State | Justin Kahut | 48-yard FG | | 3 | 0 |
| Q2 | 5:56 | Oregon State | Justin Kahut | 46-yard FG | | 6 | 0 |
| Q2 | 1:12 | Oregon State | Jacquizz Rodgers to Brady Camp | 14-yard pass | Justin Kahut kick | 13 | 0 |
| Q2 | 0:00 | Oregon State | Justin Kahut | 27-yard FG | | 16 | 0 |
| Q3 | 9:44 | UCLA | Kai Forbath | 24-yard FG | | 16 | 3 |
| Q4 | 10:10 | Oregon State | Justin Kahut | 31-yard FG | | 19 | 3 |
| Q4 | 8:39 | UCLA | Kevin Prince to Nelson Rosario | 58-yard pass | Kevin Prince pass to Nelson Rosario | 19 | 11 |
| Q4 | 2:06 | UCLA | Kevin Prince to Taylor Embree | 7-yard pass | Kevin Prince pass to Johnathan Franklin | 19 | 19 |
| Q4 | 0:44 | Oregon State | James Rodgers | 17-yard run | Justin Kahut kick | 26 | 19 |

=== California ===
| | 1 | 2 | 3 | 4 | Total |
|---|---|---|---|---|---|
| Beavers | 7 | 14 | 3 | 7 | 31 |
| Golden Bears | 0 | 7 | 0 | 7 | 14 |

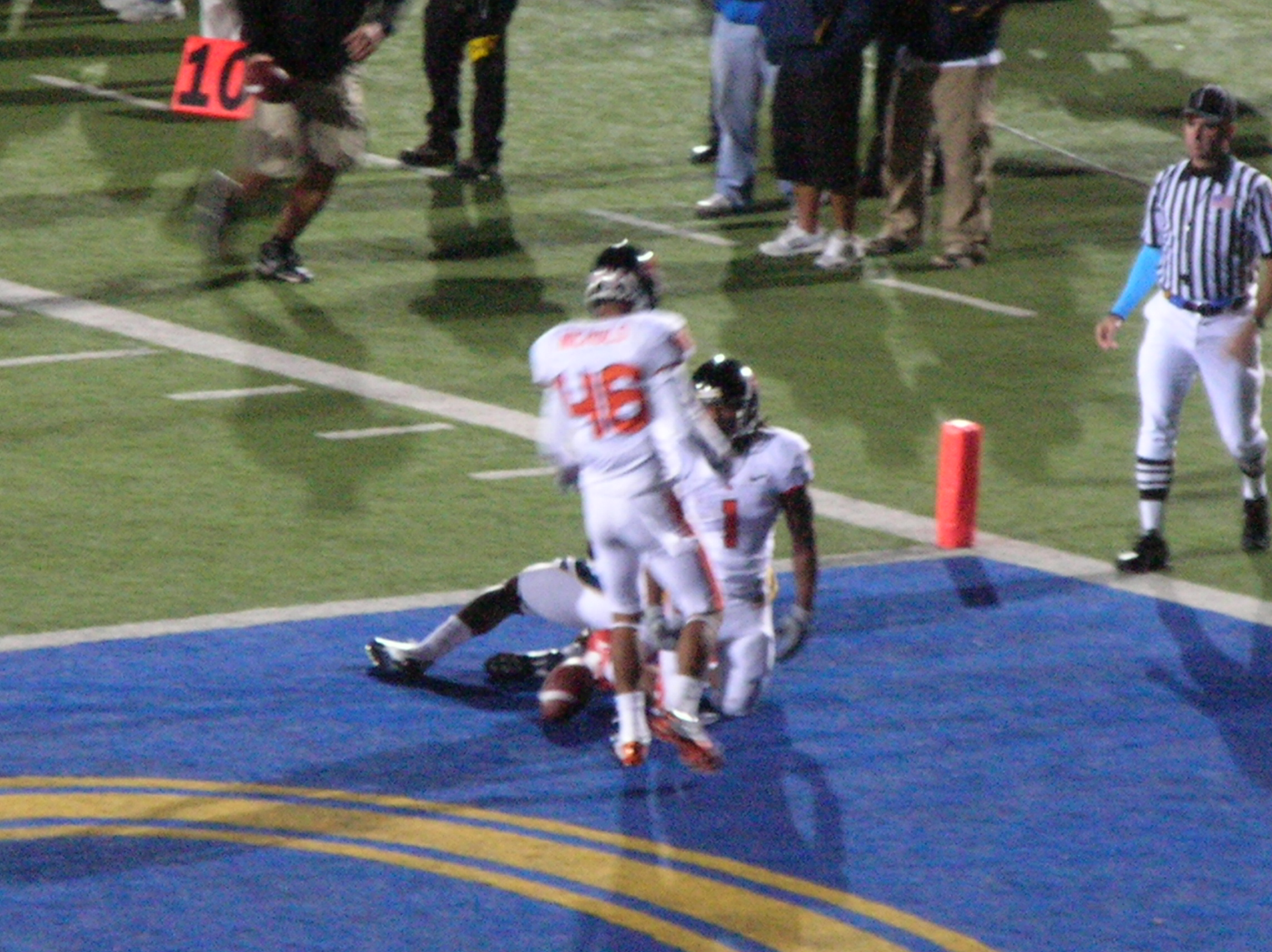
Jacquizz Rodgers (No. 1) scores a touchdown in the fourth quarter

Scoring in every quarter, the Beavers defeated the Bears for the fifth consecutive time at Cal, 31–14. Cal running back Jahvid Best left the game with a concussion in the second quarter. Sean Canfield threw 29 completions for 342 yards, most of them to Jacquizz Rodgers (9), James Rodges (6) and Joe Halahunt (6). Cal, after getting back in the Top 25 after four weeks, has given up more than 300 passing yards in each of the last three games.

| | Time | Scoring Team | Scoring Player | Yards of Score | PAT | Score | |
| | Time | Scoring Team | Scoring Player | Yards of Score | PAT | ORST | CAL |
|---|---|---|---|---|---|---|---|
| Q1 | 3:48 | Oregon State | Sean Canfield | 1-yard run | Justin Kahut kick | 7 | 0 |
| Q2 | 13:46 | Oregon State | Sean Canfield to James Rodgers | 15-yard pass | Justin Kahut kick | 14 | 0 |
| Q2 | 6:07 | California | Javid Best | 7-yard run | Giorgio Tavecchio kick | 14 | 7 |
| Q2 | 1:56 | Oregon State | Sean Canfield to Jordan Bishop | 3-yard pass | Justin Kahut kick | 21 | 7 |
| Q3 | 10:29 | Oregon State | Justin Kahut | 24-yard FG | | 24 | 7 |
| Q4 | 2:08 | Oregon State | Jacquizz Rodgers | 24-yard run | Justin Kahut kick | 31 | 7 |
| Q4 | 1:01 | California | Kevin Riley to Verran Tucker | 3-yard pass | Giorgio Tavecchio kick | 31 | 14 |

=== Washington ===
| | 1 | 2 | 3 | 4 | Total |
|---|---|---|---|---|---|
| Huskies | 0 | 7 | 0 | 14 | 21 |
| Beavers | 10 | 17 | 14 | 7 | 48 |

Oregon State won 5 straight games against the Huskies, including a 34–13 victory in Seattle. Oregon State celebrates Dad's Weekend as the Beavers will try to keep their Rose Bowl chances alive. Washington quarterback Jake Locker will make his return to Corvallis after leaving the field on a stretcher in 2007.

Oregon State won for the sixth straight time as Sean Canfield passed for four touchdowns and Jacquizz Rodgers added 159 yards rushing and two touchdowns. The other half of the Rodgers Brothers, James caught two touchdown passes and ran the opening second half kickoff to the one-yard line that really put the game away. Jake Locker passed for three touchdowns for the Huskies.

| | Time | Scoring Team | Scoring Player | Yards of Score | PAT | Score | |
| | Time | Scoring Team | Scoring Player | Yards of Score | PAT | ORST | UW |
|---|---|---|---|---|---|---|---|
| Q1 | 10:22 | Oregon State | Sean Canfield to Joe Halahuni | 3-yard pass | Justin Kahut kick | 7 | 0 |
| Q1 | 3:18 | Oregon State | Justin Kahut | 44-yard FG | | 10 | 0 |
| Q2 | 13:28 | Oregon State | Justin Kahut | 44-yard FG | | 13 | 0 |
| Q2 | 7:38 | Oregon State | Sean Canfield to James Rodgers | 6-yard pass | Justin Kahut kick | 20 | 0 |
| Q2 | 2:21 | Washington | Jake Locker to Jermaine Kearse | 3-yard pass | Erik Folk kick | 20 | 7 |
| Q2 | 0:24 | Oregon State | Sean Canfield to James Rodgers | 10-yard pass | Justin Kahut kick | 27 | 7 |
| Q3 | 14:05 | Oregon State | Jacquizz Rodgers | 1-yard run | Justin Kahut kick | 34 | 7 |
| Q3 | 7:31 | Oregon State | Jacquizz Rodgers | 8-yard run | Justin Kahut kick | 41 | 7 |
| Q4 | 9:27 | Washington | Jake Locker to Jermaine Kearse | 39-yard pass | Erik Folk kick | 41 | 14 |
| Q4 | 8:18 | Oregon State | Sean Canfield to Joe Halahuni | 5-yard pass | Justin Kahut kick | 48 | 14 |
| Q4 | 0:54 | Washington | Jake Locker to Kavario Middleton | 26-yard pass | Erik Folk kick | 48 | 21 |

=== Washington State ===
| | 1 | 2 | 3 | 4 | Total |
|---|---|---|---|---|---|
| Beavers | 14 | 7 | 7 | 14 | 42 |
| Cougars | 3 | 7 | 0 | 0 | 10 |

Oregon State has won against the Cougars in the last two years, winning by scores of 52–17 and 66–13, respectively. The Beavers will look to continue that success while Washington State will look to stop that success at home.

Oregon State beat Washington State for the third straight year. Quizz ran for 165 yards and two scores and Sean Canfield passed for 2312 yards and two scores in the victory.

| | Time | Scoring Team | Scoring Player | Yards of Score | PAT | Score | |
| | Time | Scoring Team | Scoring Player | Yards of Score | PAT | ORST | WSU |
|---|---|---|---|---|---|---|---|
| Q1 | 10:29 | Oregon State | Sean Canfield to Damola Adeniji | 10-yard pass | Justin Kahut kick | 7 | 0 |
| Q1 | 5:05 | Washington State | Patrick Rooney | 29-yard FG | | 7 | 3 |
| Q1 | 1:19 | Oregon State | Jacquizz Rodgers | 10-yard run | Justin Kahut kick | 14 | 3 |
| Q2 | 13:46 | Oregon State | Sean Canfield to Joe Halahuni | 10-yard pass | Justin Kahut kick | 21 | 3 |
| Q2 | 0:10 | Washington State | Dwight Tardy | 1-yard run | Patrick Rooney kick | 21 | 10 |
| Q3 | 1:32 | Oregon State | Markus Wheaton | 10-yard run | Justin Kahut kick | 28 | 10 |
| Q4 | 12:10 | Oregon State | Jacquizz Rodgers | 39-yard run | Justin Kahut kick | 35 | 10 |
| Q4 | 5:54 | Oregon State | Jovan Stevenson | 3-yard run | Justin Kahut kick | 42 | 10 |

=== Oregon ===
| | 1 | 2 | 3 | 4 | Total |
|---|---|---|---|---|---|
| Beavers | 10 | 13 | 10 | 0 | 33 |
| Ducks | 14 | 7 | 13 | 3 | 37 |

Oregon crushed the Rose Bowl dreams of Oregon State last year in its 65–38 drubbing of the Beavers in Reser Stadium. This year the "Civil War" game will determine the Pac-10 representative to the 2010 Rose Bowl. Oregon State won the last meeting in Autzen, 38–31 in overtime. This is the first time in the series' 112–year history that the winner gets an automatic bid to the Rose Bowl. Oregon is the heavy favorite to win the game.

For the second straight season the Oregon Ducks denied the Oregon State Beavers a trip to Pasadena to play in the Rose Bowl. This year, however, with the win the Ducks go to the Rose Bowl to play the Ohio State Buckeyes. This Civil War was a see saw battle that was exciting from the opening kick-off. LaMichael James ran for 166 yards on 25 carries that included 3 touchdowns. Jacquizz Rodgers had 64 yards rushing and 73 yards receiving and a touchdown as the two featured backs didn't disappoint. LeGarrette Blount made his return from suspension in the 3rd Quarter sparking the Ducks offense. He finished with 51 yards on 9 carries and a touchdown. The turning point in the game was a critical decision when Mike Riley opted to go for it on 4th and 15 from the Ducks 27-yard line. The pass was incomplete and the Ducks took over. The Ducks ran out the remainder of the clock after converting 2 4th down plays on the drive sealing their ticket to Pasadena. The Beavers fell all the way to the Las Vegas Bowl to play BYU.

| | Time | Scoring Team | Scoring Player | Yards of Score | PAT | Score | |
| | Time | Scoring Team | Scoring Player | Yards of Score | PAT | ORST | UO |
|---|---|---|---|---|---|---|---|
| Q1 | 11:21 | Oregon State | Jacquizz Rodgers | 1-yard run | Justin Kahut kick | 7 | 0 |
| Q1 | 8:14 | Oregon | LaMichael James | 1-yard run | Morgan Flint kick | 7 | 7 |
| Q1 | 5:09 | Oregon State | Justin Kahut | 40-yard FG | | 10 | 7 |
| Q1 | 3:46 | Oregon | Jeremiah Masoli to Jeff Maehl | 73-yard pass | Morgan Flint kick | 10 | 14 |
| Q2 | 7:20 | Oregon State | Justin Kahut | 28-yard FG | | 13 | 14 |
| Q2 | 4:30 | Oregon State | Justin Kahut | 29-yard FG | | 16 | 14 |
| Q2 | 1:19 | Oregon | LaMichael James | 6-yard run | Morgan Flint kick | 16 | 21 |
| Q2 | 0:14 | Oregon State | Sean Canfield to James Rodgers | 28-yard pass | Justin Kahut kick | 23 | 21 |
| Q3 | 10:51 | Oregon State | Sean Canfield to Casey Kjos | 9-yard pass | Justin Kahut kick | 30 | 21 |
| Q3 | 5:45 | Oregon | LeGarrette Blount | 12-yard run | Morgan Flint kick | 30 | 28 |
| Q3 | 2:28 | Oregon State | Justin Kahut | 45-yard FG | | 33 | 28 |
| Q3 | 1:20 | Oregon | LaMichael James | 52-yard run | Two-Point run conversion failed | 33 | 34 |
| Q4 | 10:13 | Oregon | Morgan Flint | 34-yard FG | | 33 | 37 |

== Rankings ==
Ranking movements Legend: ██ Increase in ranking ██ Decrease in ranking — = Not ranked
| | Week | | | | | | | | | | | | | | | |
| Poll | Pre | 1 | 2 | 3 | 4 | 5 | 6 | 7 | 8 | 9 | 10 | 11 | 12 | 13 | 14 | Final |
|---|---|---|---|---|---|---|---|---|---|---|---|---|---|---|---|---|
| AP | — | — | — | — | — | — | — | — | — | — | — | 20 | 16 | 13 | 16 | — |
| Coaches | 25 | 24 | 24 | — | — | — | — | — | — | — | — | 20 | 18 | 16 | 20 | — |
| Harris | Not released | | | | — | — | — | — | — | — | — | 22 | 18 | 16 | 19 | Not released |
| BCS | Not released | | | | | | | — | — | — | 23 | 19 | 16 | 16 | 18 | Not released |

== Statistics ==
=== Team ===
==== Scores by quarter ====
| | 1 | 2 | 3 | 4 | Total |
|---|---|---|---|---|---|
| Oregon State | 108 | 116 | 79 | 86 | 389 |
| Opponents | 34 | 77 | 65 | 105 | 281 |

==== Yardage ====
| Stat | Oregon State | Opponents |
|---|---|---|
| Points Per Game | 32.4 | 23.4 |
| First Downs | 261 | 233 |
| Rushing Yds | 1730 | 1376 |
| Rushing attempts | 413 | 357 |
| Avg. Per Carry | 4.2 | 3.9 |
| Avg. Rushing Yds. Per Game | 144.2 | 114.7 |
