= 2009 NCAA Division I FBS football rankings =

Football rankings

- Season: 2009
- Bowl season: 2009–10 bowl games
- Preseason No. 1: Florida
- End of season champions: Alabama
- Conference with most teams in final AP poll: ACC, Big Ten, SEC (4)

Three human polls and one formula ranking make up the 2009 NCAA Division I FBS (Football Bowl Subdivision) football rankings, in addition to various publications' preseason polls. Unlike most sports, college football's governing body, the NCAA, does not bestow a national championship title. That title is bestowed by one or more of four different polling agencies. There are two main weekly polls that begin in the preseason: the AP Poll and the Coaches Poll. Two additional polls are released midway through the season; the Harris Interactive Poll is released after the fourth week of the season and the Bowl Championship Series (BCS) standings is released after the seventh week. The Harris Poll and Coaches Poll are factors in the BCS standings. At the end of the season, on Sunday, December 6, 2009, the BCS standings determines who plays in the BCS bowl games as well as the 2010 BCS National Championship Game on January 7, 2010 at the Rose Bowl in Pasadena, CA.

== Legend ==
	Increase in ranking
	Decrease in ranking
	Not ranked previous week
	Selected for BCS National Championship Game
(#–#)	Win–loss record
(Italics)	Number of first place votes
т	Tied with team above or below also with this symbol

== AP Poll ==
	Preseason Aug 22	Week 1 Sep 8	Week 2 Sep 13	Week 3 Sep 20	Week 4 Sep 27	Week 5 Oct 4	Week 6 Oct 11	Week 7 Oct 18	Week 8 Oct 25	Week 9 Nov 1	Week 10 Nov 8	Week 11 Nov 15	Week 12 Nov 22	Week 13 Nov 29	Week 14 Dec 6	Week 15 (Final) Jan 7	
1.	Florida (58)	Florida (1–0) (56)	Florida (2–0) (56)	Florida (3–0) (55)	Florida (4–0) (55)	Florida (4–0) (54)	Florida (5–0) (50)	Alabama (7–0) (39)	Florida (7–0) (30)	Florida (8–0) (38)	Florida (9–0) (39)	Florida (10–0) (36)	Florida (11–0) (36)	Florida (12–0) (46)	Alabama (13–0) (58)	Alabama (14–0) (60)	1.
2.	Texas (2)	Texas (1–0) (2)	Texas (2–0) (1)	Texas (3–0) (2)	Texas (4–0) (1)	Texas (4–0) (1)	Alabama (6–0) (10)	Florida (6–0) (20)	Alabama (8–0) (23)	Texas (8–0) (13)	Texas (9–0) (10)	Alabama (10–0) (14)	Alabama (11–0) (13)	Alabama (12–0) (7)	Texas (13–0) (2)	Texas (13–1)	2.
3.	Oklahoma	USC (1–0)	USC (2–0) (1)	Alabama (3–0) (3)	Alabama (4–0) (4)	Alabama (5–0) (5)	Texas (5–0)	Texas (6–0)	Texas (7–0) (7)	Alabama (8–0) (8)	Alabama (9–0) (11)	Texas (10–0) (10)	Texas (11–0) (11)	Texas (12–0) (7)	TCU (12–0)	Florida (13–1)	3.
4.	USC	Alabama (1–0) (2)	Alabama (2–0) (2)	Ole Miss (2–0)	LSU (4–0)	LSU (5–0)	Virginia Tech (5–1)	USC (5–1)	USC (6–1)	Cincinnati (8–0)	TCU (9–0)	TCU (10–0)	TCU (11–0)	TCU (12–0)	Cincinnati (12–0)	Boise State (14–0)	4.
5.	Alabama	Oklahoma State (1–0)	Ole Miss (1–0) т	Penn State (3–0)	Boise State (4–0)	Virginia Tech (4–1)	Boise State (5–0)	Cincinnati (6–0)	Cincinnati (7–0)	Boise State (8–0)	Cincinnati (9–0)	Cincinnati (10–0)	Cincinnati (10–0)	Cincinnati (11–0)	Florida (12–1)	Ohio State (11-2)	5.
6.	Ohio State	Ole Miss (1–0)	Penn State (2–0) т	California (3–0)	Virginia Tech (3–1)	Boise State (5–0)	USC (4–1)	Boise State (6–0)	Boise State (7–0)	TCU (8–0)	Boise State (9–0)	Boise State (10–0)	Boise State (10–0)	Boise State (12–0)	Boise State (13–0)	TCU (12–1)	6.
7.	Virginia Tech	Penn State (1–0)	BYU (2–0)	LSU (3–0)	USC (3–1)	USC (4–1)	Ohio State (5–1)	Iowa (7–0)	Iowa (8–0)	Oregon (7–1)	Georgia Tech (9–1)	Georgia Tech (10–1)	Georgia Tech (10–1)	Oregon (9–2)	Oregon (10–2)	Iowa (11–2)	7.
8.	Ole Miss	Ohio State (1–0)	California (2–0)	Boise State (3–0)	Oklahoma (2–1)	Cincinnati (5–0)	Cincinnati (5–0)	Miami (FL) (5–1)	TCU (7–0)	Iowa (9–0)	Pittsburgh (8–1)	Pittsburgh (9–1)	Pittsburgh (9–1)	Ohio State (10–2)	Ohio State (10–2)	Cincinnati (12–1)	8.
9.	Oklahoma State т	BYU (1–0)	LSU (2–0)	Miami (FL) (2–0)	Ohio State (3–1)	Ohio State (4–1)	Miami (FL) (4–1)	LSU (5–1)	LSU (6–1)	LSU (7–1)	LSU (7–2)	Ohio State (9–2)	Ohio State (10–2)	Iowa (10–2)	Georgia Tech (11–2)	Penn State (11–2)	9.
10.	Penn State т	California (1–0)	Boise State (2–0)	Oklahoma (2–1)	Cincinnati (4–0)	TCU (4–0)	LSU (5–1)	TCU (6–0)	Oregon (6–1)	Georgia Tech (7–1)	Ohio State (8–2)	LSU (8–2)	Oregon (9–2)	Penn State (10–2)	Iowa (10–2)	Virginia Tech (10–3)	10.
11.	LSU	LSU (1–0)	Ohio State (1–1)	Virginia Tech (2–1)	TCU (3–0)	Miami (FL) (3–1)	Iowa (6–0)	Georgia Tech (6–1)	Georgia Tech (7–1)	Penn State (7–1)	USC (7–2)	Oregon (8–2)	Oklahoma State (9–2)	Virginia Tech (9–3)	Penn State (10–2)	Oregon (10–3)	11.
12.	California	Boise State (1–0)	Oklahoma (1–1)	USC (2–1)	Houston (3–0)	Iowa (5–0)	TCU (5–0)	Oregon (5–1)	Penn State (7–1)	USC (6–2)	Miami (FL) (7–2)	Oklahoma State (8–2)	Penn State (10–2)	Georgia Tech (10–2)	Virginia Tech (9–3)	BYU (11–2)	12.
13.	Georgia	Oklahoma (0–1)	Virginia Tech (1–1)	Ohio State (2–1)	Iowa (4–0)	Oregon (4–1)	Oregon (5–1)	Penn State (6–1)	Oklahoma State (6–1)	Houston (7–1)	Houston (8–1)	Penn State (9–2)	Iowa (10–2)	Oregon State (8–3)	LSU (9–3)	Georgia Tech (11–3)	13.
14.	Boise State	Virginia Tech (0–1)	Georgia Tech (2–0)	Cincinnati (3–0)	Oklahoma State (3–1)	Penn State (4–1)	Penn State (5–1)	Oklahoma State (5–1)	Virginia Tech (5–2)	Pittsburgh (7–1)	Oregon (7–2)	Stanford (7–3)	Virginia Tech (8–3)	Pittsburgh (9–2)	Miami (FL) (9–3)	Nebraska (10–4)	14.
15.	Georgia Tech	Georgia Tech (1–0)	TCU (1–0)	TCU (2–0)	Penn State (3–1)	Oklahoma State (3–1)	Nebraska (4–1)	Virginia Tech (5–2)	Houston (6–1)	Ohio State (7–2)	Iowa (9–1)	Iowa (9–2)	Clemson (8–3)	LSU (9–3)	BYU (10–2)	Pittsburgh (10–3)	15.
16.	Oregon	TCU (0–0)	Oklahoma State (1–1)	Oklahoma State (2–1)	Oregon (3–1)	Kansas (4–0)	Oklahoma State (4–1)	BYU (6–1)	Pittsburgh (7–1)	Miami (FL) (6–2)	Utah (8–1)	Virginia Tech (7–3)	Oregon State (8–3)	BYU (10–2)	Oregon State (8–4)	Wisconsin (10–3)	16.
17.	TCU	Utah (1–0)	Cincinnati (2–0)	Houston (2–0)	Miami (FL) (2–1)	Auburn (5–0)	Kansas (5–0)	Houston (5–1)	Ohio State (6–2)	Utah (7–1)	Oklahoma State (7–2)	Wisconsin (8–2)	LSU (8–3)	Miami (FL) (9–3)	Pittsburgh (9–3)	LSU (9–4)	17.
18.	Florida State	Notre Dame (1–0)	Utah (2–0)	Florida State (2–1)	Georgia (3–1) т	BYU (4–1)	BYU (5–1)	Ohio State (5–2)	Miami (FL) (5–2)	Oklahoma State (6–2)	Arizona (6–2)	Clemson (7–3)	BYU (9–2)	Houston (10–2)	West Virginia (9–3)	Utah (10–3)	18.
19.	Utah	North Carolina (1–0)	Nebraska (1–0)	BYU (2–1)	Kansas (4–0) т	Oklahoma (2–2)	Georgia Tech (5–1)	Utah (5–1)	Utah (6–1)	Notre Dame (6–2)	Penn State (8–2)	BYU (8–2)	Miami (FL) (8–3)	California (8–3)	Stanford (8–4)	Miami (FL) (9–4)	19.
20.	BYU	Miami (FL) (1–0)	Miami (FL) (1–0)	Kansas (3–0)	BYU (3–1)	Ole Miss (3–1)	Oklahoma (3–2)	Pittsburgh (6–1)	West Virginia (6–1)	Oklahoma (5–3)	Virginia Tech (6–3)	Oregon State (7–3)	Ole Miss (8–3)	USC (8–3)	Nebraska (9–4)	Ole Miss (9–4)	20.
21.	North Carolina	Georgia (0–1)	Houston (2–0)	Georgia (2–1)	Ole Miss (2–1)	Nebraska (3–1)	South Florida (5–0)	Texas Tech (5–2)	South Carolina (6–2)	Arizona (5–2)	Wisconsin (7–2)	Miami (FL) (7–3)	California (8–3)	Nebraska (9–3)	Oklahoma State (9–3)	Texas Tech (9–4)	21.
22.	Iowa	Nebraska (1–0)	Kansas (2–0)	North Carolina (3–0)	Michigan (4–0)	Georgia Tech (4–1)	South Carolina (5–1)	West Virginia (5–1)	Oklahoma (4–3)	Virginia Tech (5–3)	BYU (7–2)	USC (7–3)	Utah (9–2)	Oklahoma State (9–3)	Arizona (8–4)	USC (9–4)	22.
23.	Notre Dame	Cincinnati (1–0)	Georgia (1–1)	Michigan (3–0)	Nebraska (3–1)	South Florida (5–0)	Houston (4–1)	South Carolina (5–2)	Arizona (5–2)	California (6–2)	South Florida (6–2)	Utah (8–2)	North Carolina (8–3)	Stanford (8–4)	Utah (9–3)	Central Michigan (12–2)	23.
24.	Nebraska	Kansas (1–0)	North Carolina (2–0)	Washington (2–1)	California (3–1)	Missouri (4–0)	Utah (4–1)	Kansas (5–1)	Ole Miss (5–2)	Wisconsin (6–2)	Clemson (6–3)	Houston (8–2)	USC (7–3)	West Virginia (8–3)	Wisconsin (9–3)	Clemson (9–5)	24.
25.	Kansas	Missouri (1–0)	Michigan (2–0)	Nebraska (2–1)	Georgia Tech (3–1)	South Carolina (4–1)	Notre Dame (4–1)	Oklahoma (3–3)	Notre Dame (5–2)	BYU (6–2)	Stanford (6–3)	Rutgers (7–2)	Houston (9–2)	Clemson (8–4)	Central Michigan (11–2)	West Virginia (9–4)	25.
	Preseason Aug 22	Week 1 Sep 8	Week 2 Sep 13	Week 3 Sep 20	Week 4 Sep 27	Week 5 Oct 4	Week 6 Oct 11	Week 7 Oct 18	Week 8 Oct 25	Week 9 Nov 1	Week 10 Nov 8	Week 11 Nov 15	Week 12 Nov 22	Week 13 Nov 29	Week 14 Dec 6	Week 15 (Final) Jan 7	
		Dropped: Iowa; Florida State; Oregon	Dropped: Notre Dame; Missouri	Dropped: Georgia Tech; Utah	Dropped: Florida State; North Carolina; Washington	Dropped: Houston; Georgia; Michigan; California	Dropped: Auburn; Ole Miss; Missouri	Dropped: Nebraska; South Florida; Notre Dame	Dropped: BYU; Texas Tech; Kansas	Dropped: West Virginia; South Carolina; Ole Miss	Dropped: Notre Dame; Oklahoma; California	Dropped: Arizona; South Florida	Dropped: Stanford; Wisconsin; Rutgers	Dropped: Ole Miss; Utah; North Carolina	Dropped: Houston; California; USC; Clemson	Dropped: Oregon State; Stanford; Oklahoma State; Arizona	

== Coaches Poll ==
	Preseason Aug 7	Week 1 Sep 8	Week 2 Sep 13	Week 3 Sep 20	Week 4 Sep 27	Week 5 Oct 4	Week 6 Oct 11	Week 7 Oct 18	Week 8 Oct 25	Week 9 Nov 1	Week 10 Nov 8	Week 11 Nov 15	Week 12 Nov 22	Week 13 Nov 29	Week 14 Dec 6	Week 15 (Final) Jan 7	
1.	Florida (53)	Florida (1–0) (56)	Florida (2–0) (56)	Florida (3–0) (59)	Florida (4–0) (58)	Florida (4–0) (57)	Florida (5–0) (53)	Florida (6–0) (49)	Florida (7–0) (46)	Florida (8–0) (50)	Florida (9–0) (48)	Florida (10–0) (48)	Florida (11–0) (47)	Florida (12–0) (53)	Alabama (13–0) (54)	Alabama (14–0) (58)	1.
2.	Texas (4)	Texas (1–0) (2)	Texas (2–0)	Texas (3–0)	Texas (4–0) (1)	Texas (4–0) (1)	Texas (5–0) (1)	Alabama (7–0) (9)	Alabama (8–0) (9)	Texas (8–0) (4)	Texas (9–0) (4)	Texas (10–0) (4)	Texas (11–0) (4)	Texas (12–0) (3)	Texas (13–0) (4)	Texas (13–1)	2.
3.	Oklahoma (1)	USC (1–0) (1)	USC (2–0) (3)	Alabama (3–0)	Alabama (4–0)	Alabama (5–0) (1)	Alabama (6–0) (5)	Texas (6–0) (1)	Texas (7–0) (4)	Alabama (8–0) (5)	Alabama (9–0) (7)	Alabama (10–0) (7)	Alabama (11–0) (8)	Alabama (12–0) (3)	TCU (12–0)	Florida (13–1)	3.
4.	USC (1)	Alabama (1–0)	Alabama (2–0)	Penn State (3–0)	LSU (4–0)	LSU (5–0)	Virginia Tech (5–1)	USC (5–1)	USC (6–1)	TCU (8–0)	TCU (9–0)	TCU (10–0)	TCU (11–0)	TCU (12–0)	Cincinnati (12–0) (1)	Boise State (14–0)	4.
5.	Alabama	Penn State (1–0)	Penn State (2–0)	Ole Miss (2–0)	Boise State (4–0)	Virginia Tech (4–1)	USC (4–1)	Boise State (6–0)	Boise State (7–0)	Boise State (8–0)	Cincinnati (9–0)	Cincinnati (10–0)	Cincinnati (10–0)	Cincinnati (11–0)	Florida (12–1)	Ohio State (11–2)	5.
6.	Ohio State	Oklahoma State (1–0)	Ole Miss (1–0)	California (3–0)	Virginia Tech (3–1)	Boise State (5–0)	Boise State (5–0)	Cincinnati (6–0)	TCU (7–0)	Iowa (9–0)	Boise State (9–0)	Boise State (10–0)	Boise State (11–0)	Boise State (12–0)	Boise State (13–0)	TCU (12–1)	6.
7.	Virginia Tech	Ohio State (1–0)	LSU (2–0) T	LSU (3–0)	USC (3–1)	USC (4–1)	Ohio State (5–1)	TCU (6–0)	Cincinnati (7–0)	Cincinnati (8–0)	Georgia Tech (9–1)	Georgia Tech (10–1)	Georgia Tech (10–1)	Ohio State (10–2)	Oregon (10–2)	Iowa (11–2)	7.
8.	Penn State	Ole Miss (1–0)	California (2–0) T	Boise State (3–0)	Oklahoma (2–1)	Ohio State (4–1)	TCU (5–0)	Iowa (7–0)	Iowa (8–0)	Oregon (7–1)	Ohio State (8–2)	Ohio State (9–2)	Ohio State (10–2)	Oregon (9–2)	Ohio State (10–2)	Penn State (11–2)	8.
9.	LSU	LSU (1–0)	BYU (2–0)	Oklahoma (2–1)	Ohio State (3–1)	TCU (4–0)	Cincinnati (5–0)	Miami (FL) (5–1)	LSU (6–1)	LSU (7–1)	Pittsburgh (8–1)	Pittsburgh (9–1)	Pittsburgh (9–1)	Penn State (10–2)	Penn State (10–2)	Cincinnati (12–1)	9.
10.	Ole Miss	California (1–0)	Boise State (2–0)	USC (2–1)	TCU (3–0)	Cincinnati (5–0)	LSU (5–1)	LSU (5–1)	Penn State (7–1)	Penn State (8–1)	USC (7–2)	LSU (8–2)	Oregon (9–2)	Iowa (10–2)	Georgia Tech (11–2)	Virginia Tech (10–3)	10.
11.	Oklahoma State	Boise State (1–0)	Ohio State (1–1)	Ohio State (2–1)	Cincinnati (4–0)	Miami (FL) (3–1)	Miami (FL) (4–1)	Penn State (6–1)	Georgia Tech (7–1)	Georgia Tech (8–1)	LSU (7–2)	Oregon (8–2)	Penn State (10–2)	Virginia Tech (9–3)	Iowa (10–2)	Oregon (10–3)	11.
12.	California	BYU (1–0)	Oklahoma (1–1)	Virginia Tech (2–1)	Oklahoma State (3–1)	Penn State (4–1)	Iowa (6–0)	Oklahoma State (5–1)	Oregon (6–1)	Ohio State (7–2)	Houston (8–1)	Penn State (9–2)	Oklahoma State (9–2)	Georgia Tech (10–2)	Virginia Tech (9–3)	BYU (11–2)	12.
13.	Georgia	Georgia Tech (1–0)	Georgia Tech (2–0)	Miami (FL) (2–0)	Penn State (3–1)	Oklahoma State (3–1)	Penn State (5–1)	Georgia Tech (6–1)	Oklahoma State (6–1)	USC (6–2)	Iowa (9–1)	Oklahoma State (8–2)	Iowa (10–2)	BYU (10–2)	LSU (9–3)	Georgia Tech (11–3)	13.
14.	Oregon	Oklahoma (0–1)	Virginia Tech (1–1)	TCU (2–0)	Georgia (3–1)	Iowa (5–0)	Oklahoma State (4–1)	Oregon (5–1)	Virginia Tech (5–2)	Pittsburgh (7–1)	Utah (8–1)	Wisconsin (8–2)	Virginia Tech (8–3)	LSU (9–3)	BYU (10–2)	Nebraska (10–4)	14.
15.	Georgia Tech	Virginia Tech (0–1)	TCU (1–0)	Cincinnati (3–0)	Houston (3–0)	Kansas (4–0)	Kansas (5–0)	Virginia Tech (5–2)	Ohio State (6–2)	Houston (7–1)	Miami (FL) (7–2)	Iowa (9–2)	BYU (9–2)	Pittsburgh (9–2)	Miami (FL) (9–3)	Pittsburgh (10–3)	15.
16.	Boise State	TCU (0–0)	Utah (2–0)	Oklahoma State (2–1)	Kansas (4–0)	Ole Miss (3–1)	Oregon (5–1)	BYU (6–1)	Houston (6–1)	Utah (7–1)	Oregon (7–2)	Virginia Tech (7–3)	Clemson (8–3)	Oregon State (8–3)	Pittsburgh (9–3)	Wisconsin (10–3)	16.
17.	TCU	Utah (1–0)	Oklahoma State (1–1)	Georgia (2–1)	Iowa (4–0)	Oregon (4–1)	Nebraska (4–1)	Houston (5–1) т	Pittsburgh (7–1)	Miami (FL) (6–2)	Penn State (8–2)	Stanford (7–3)	LSU (8–3)	Miami (FL) (9–3)	West Virginia (9–3)	LSU (9–4)	17.
18.	Utah	Nebraska (1–0)	Nebraska (2–0)	North Carolina (3–0)	Ole Miss (2–1)	Missouri (4–0)	Oklahoma (3–2)	Ohio State (5–2) т	Miami (FL) (5–2)	Oklahoma State (6–2)	Oklahoma State (7–2)	BYU (8–2)	Oregon State (8–3)	Houston (10–2)	Oklahoma State (9–3)	Utah (10–3)	18.
19.	Florida State	North Carolina (1–0)	North Carolina (2–0)	Kansas (3–0)	California (3–1)	Auburn (5–0)	BYU (5–1)	Pittsburgh (6–1)	Utah (6–1)	Arizona (5–2)	Arizona (6–2)	Clemson (7–3)	Utah (9–2)	USC (8–3)	Nebraska (9–4)	Miami (FL) (9–4)	19.
20.	North Carolina	Notre Dame (1–0)	Georgia (1–1)	BYU (2–1)	Michigan (4–0)	BYU (4–1)	Georgia Tech (5–1)	Utah (5–1)	West Virginia (6–1)	Oklahoma (5–3)	Wisconsin (7–2)	Oregon State (7–3)	Houston (9–2)	Nebraska (9–3)	Oregon State (8–4)	USC (9–4)	20.
21.	Iowa	Georgia (0–1)	Cincinnati (2–0)	Missouri (3–0)	BYU (3–1) т	Oklahoma (2–2)	South Florida (5–0)	Kansas (5–1)	South Carolina (6–2)	Notre Dame (6–2)	Virginia Tech (6–3)	USC (7–3)	Miami (FL) (8–3)	Oklahoma State (9–3)	Stanford (8–4)	Ole Miss (9–4)	21.
22.	Nebraska	Miami (FL) (1–0)	Miami (FL) (1–0)	Michigan (3–0)	Miami (FL) (2–1) т	Nebraska (3–1)	South Carolina (5–1)	West Virginia (5–1)	Ole Miss (5–2)	Wisconsin (6–2)	BYU (7–2)	Houston (8–2)	USC (7–3)	California (8–3)	Wisconsin (9–3)	West Virginia (9–4)	22.
23.	Notre Dame	Cincinnati (1–0)	Kansas (2–0)	Houston (2–0)	Missouri (4–0)	Georgia Tech (4–1)	Houston (4–1)	South Carolina (5–2)	Oklahoma (4–3)	California (6–2)	West Virginia (7–2)	Utah (8–2)	Nebraska (8–3)	West Virginia (8–3)	Arizona (8–4)	Texas Tech (9–4)	23.
24.	BYU	Oregon State (1–0)	Oregon State (2–0)	Nebraska (2–1)	Nebraska (3–1)	South Florida (5–0)	Missouri (4–0)	Texas Tech (5–2)	Arizona (5–2)	Virginia Tech (5–3)	South Florida (6–2)	Miami (FL) (7–3)	North Carolina (8–3)	Stanford (8–4)	Utah (9–3)	Central Michigan (12–2)	24.
25.	Oregon State	Kansas (1–0)	Missouri (2–0)	Florida State (2–1)	Oregon (3–1)	Wisconsin (5–0)	Notre Dame (4–1)	Ole Miss (4–2)	Notre Dame (5–2)	BYU (6–2)	Auburn (7–3)	Nebraska (7–3) T; North Carolina (7–3) T	Ole Miss (8–3)	Utah (9–3)	Houston (10–3)	Oklahoma State (9–4)	25.
	Preseason Aug 7	Week 1 Sep 8	Week 2 Sep 13	Week 3 Sep 20	Week 4 Sep 27	Week 5 Oct 4	Week 6 Oct 11	Week 7 Oct 18	Week 8 Oct 25	Week 9 Nov 1	Week 10 Nov 8	Week 11 Nov 15	Week 12 Nov 22	Week 13 Nov 29	Week 14 Dec 6	Week 15 (Final) Jan 7	
		Dropped: Oregon; Florida State; Iowa	Dropped: Notre Dame	Dropped: Georgia Tech; Utah; Oregon State	Dropped: North Carolina; Florida State	Dropped: Georgia; Houston; California; Michigan	Dropped: Ole Miss; Auburn; Wisconsin	Dropped: Nebraska; Oklahoma; South Florida; Missouri; Notre Dame	Dropped: BYU; Kansas; Texas Tech	Dropped: West Virginia; South Carolina; Ole Miss	Dropped: Oklahoma; Notre Dame; California	Dropped: Arizona; West Virginia; South Florida; Auburn	Dropped: Wisconsin; Stanford	Dropped: Clemson; North Carolina; Ole Miss	Dropped: USC; California	Dropped: Oregon State; Stanford; Arizona; Houston	

== Harris Interactive Poll ==
	Week 4 Sep 27	Week 5 Oct 4	Week 6 Oct 11	Week 7 Oct 18	Week 8 Oct 25	Week 9 Nov 1	Week 10 Nov 8	Week 11 Nov 15	Week 12 Nov 22	Week 13 Nov 29	Week 14 (Final) Dec 6	
1.	Florida (4–0) (99)	Florida (4–0) (97)	Florida (5–0) (99)	Florida (6–0) (77)	Florida (7–0) (75)	Florida (8–0) (83)	Florida (9–0) (82)	Florida (10–0) (78)	Florida (11–0) (78)	Florida (12–0) (82)	Alabama (13–0) (105)	1.
2.	Texas (4–0) (4)	Texas (4–0) (12)	Alabama (6–0) (13) т	Alabama (7–0) (33)	Alabama (8–0) (17)	Texas (8–0) (19)	Texas (9–0) (18)	Texas (10–0) (19)	Texas (11–0) (18)	Texas (12–0) (15)	Texas (13–0) (6)	2.
3.	Alabama (4–0) (11)	Alabama (5–0) (5)	Texas (5–0) (2) т	Texas (6–0) (4)	Texas (7–0) (20)	Alabama (8–0) (9)	Alabama (9–0) (14)	Alabama (10–0) (16)	Alabama (11–0) (15)	Alabama (12–0) (12)	TCU (12–0) (3)	3.
4.	LSU (4–0)	LSU (5–0)	Virginia Tech (5–1)	USC (5–1)	USC (6–1)	Boise State (8–0) (1)	TCU (9–0)	TCU (10–0) (1)	TCU (11–0) (3)	TCU (12–0) (4)	Cincinnati (12–0)	4.
5.	Boise State (4–0)	Boise State (5–0)	Boise State (5–0)	Boise State (6–0)	Boise State (7–0)	Cincinnati (8–0)	Cincinnati (9–0)	Cincinnati (10–0)	Cincinnati (10–0)	Cincinnati (11–0)	Florida (12–1)	5.
6.	Virginia Tech (3–1)	Virginia Tech (4–1)	USC (4–1)	Cincinnati (6–0)	Cincinnati (7–0)	TCU (8–0)	Boise State (9–0)	Boise State (10–0)	Boise State (11–0)	Boise State (12–0)	Boise State (13–0)	6.
7.	USC (3–1)	USC (4–1)	Ohio State (5–1)	Iowa (7–0)	TCU (7–0)	Iowa (9–0) (2)	Georgia Tech (9–1)	Georgia Tech (10–1)	Georgia Tech (10–1)	Ohio State (10–2)	Oregon (10–2)	7.
8.	Ohio State (3–1)	Ohio State (4–1)	Cincinnati (5–0)	TCU (6–0)	Iowa (8–0) (1)	Oregon (7–1)	Ohio State (8–2)	Ohio State (9–2)	Ohio State (10–2)	Oregon (9–2)	Ohio State (10–2)	8.
9.	Oklahoma (2–1)	Cincinnati (5–0)	LSU (5–1)	LSU (5–1)	LSU (6–1)	LSU (7–1)	Pittsburgh (8–1)	Pittsburgh (9–1)	Pittsburgh (9–1)	Penn State (10–2)	Penn State (10–2)	9.
10.	Cincinnati (4–0)	TCU (4–0)	TCU (5–0)	Miami (FL) (5–1)	Penn State (7–1)	Penn State (8–1)	USC (7–2)	LSU (8–2)	Oregon (9–2)	Iowa (10–2)	Georgia Tech (11–2)	10.
11.	TCU (3–0)	Iowa (5–0)	Iowa (6–0)	Penn State (6–1)	Oregon (6–1)	Georgia Tech (8–1)	LSU (7–2)	Oregon (8–2)	Penn State (10–2)	Georgia Tech (10–2)	Iowa (10–2)	11.
12.	Penn State (3–1)	Miami (FL) (3–1)	Miami (FL) (4–1)	Oregon (5–1)	Georgia Tech (7–1)	USC (6–2)	Iowa (9–1)	Penn State (9–2)	Oklahoma State (9–2)	Virginia Tech (10–2)	Virginia Tech (9–3)	12.
13.	Houston (3–0)	Penn State (4–1)	Penn State (5–1)	Georgia Tech (6–1)	Oklahoma State (6–1)	Ohio State (7–2)	Houston (8–1)	Oklahoma State (8–2)	Iowa (10–2)	BYU (10–2)	LSU (9–3)	13.
14.	Iowa (4–0)	Oklahoma State (3–1)	Oregon (5–1)	Oklahoma State (5–1)	Virginia Tech (5–2)	Houston (7–1)	Oregon (7–2)	Iowa (9–2)	Virginia Tech (8–3)	LSU (9–3)	BYU (10–2)	14.
15.	Oklahoma State (3–1)	Oregon (4–1)	Oklahoma State (4–1)	Virginia Tech (5–2)	Ohio State (5–2)	Pittsburgh (7–1)	Miami (FL) (7–2)	Wisconsin (8–2)	BYU (9–2)	Pittsburgh (9–2)	Miami (FL) (9–3)	15.
16.	Kansas (4–0)	Kansas (4–0)	Kansas (5–0)	BYU (6–1)	Houston (6–1)	Utah (7–1)	Utah (8–1)	Virginia Tech (7–3)	LSU (8–3)	Oregon State (8–3)	Pittsburgh (9–3)	16.
17.	Georgia (3–1)	BYU (4–1)	BYU (5–1)	Ohio State (5–2)	Pittsburgh (7–1)	Miami (FL) (6–2)	Penn State (8–2)	Stanford (7–3)	Clemson (8–3)	Miami (FL) (9–3)	Oklahoma State (9–3)	17.
18.	Ole Miss (2–1)	Ole Miss (3–1)	Oklahoma (2–2)	Houston (5–1)	Miami (FL) (5–2)	Oklahoma State (6–2)	Oklahoma State (7–2)	BYU (8–2)	Oregon State (8–3)	Houston (10–2)	West Virginia (9–3)	18.
19.	BYU (3–1)	Auburn (5–0)	Nebraska (4–1)	Utah (5–1)	Utah (6–1)	Oklahoma (5–3)	Arizona (6–2)	Clemson (7–3)	Utah (9–2)	USC (8–3)	Oregon State (8–4)	19.
20.	Michigan (4–0)	Oklahoma (2–2)	Georgia Tech (5–1)	Pittsburgh (6–1)	West Virginia (6–1)	Notre Dame (6–2)	Wisconsin (7–2)	USC (7–3)	Houston (9–2)	Oklahoma State (9–3)	Nebraska (8–4)	20.
21.	California (3–1)	Nebraska (3–1)	South Florida (5–0)	Kansas (5–1)	South Carolina (6–2)	Arizona (5–2)	Virginia Tech (6–3)	Utah (8–2)	Miami (FL) (8–3)	California (8–3)	Stanford (8–4)	21.
22.	Miami (FL) (2–1)	Georgia Tech (4–1)	South Carolina (5–1)	Texas Tech (5–2)	Oklahoma (4–3)	California (6–2)	BYU (7–2)	Oregon State (7–3)	USC (7–3)	Nebraska (9–3)	Utah (9–3)	22.
23.	Oregon (3–1)	Missouri (4–0)	Houston (4–1)	West Virginia (5–1)	Ole Miss (5–2)	Virginia Tech (5–3)	South Florida (6–2)	Houston (8–2)	California (8–3)	Stanford (8–4)	Wisconsin (9–3)	23.
24.	Nebraska (3–1)	South Florida (5–0)	Auburn (5–1)	South Florida (5–1)	Notre Dame (5–2)	Wisconsin (6–2)	West Virginia (7–2)	Miami (FL) (7–3)	Nebraska (8–3)	Utah (9–3)	Arizona (8–4)	24.
25.	Missouri (4–0)	Wisconsin (5–0)	Notre Dame (4–1)	Oklahoma (3–3)	Arizona (5–2)	BYU (6–2)	Clemson (6–3)	Nebraska (7–3)	Ole Miss (8–3)	West Virginia (8–3)	Houston (10–3)	25.
	Week 4 Sep 27	Week 5 Oct 4	Week 6 Oct 11	Week 7 Oct 18	Week 8 Oct 25	Week 9 Nov 1	Week 10 Nov 8	Week 11 Nov 15	Week 12 Nov 22	Week 13 Nov 29	Week 14 (Final) Dec 6	
		Dropped: Houston; Georgia; Michigan; California	Dropped: Ole Miss; Missouri; Wisconsin	Dropped: Nebraska; South Carolina; Auburn; Notre Dame	Dropped: BYU; Kansas; Texas Tech; South Florida	Dropped: West Virginia; South Carolina; Ole Miss	Dropped: Oklahoma; Notre Dame; California	Dropped: Arizona; South Florida; West Virginia	Dropped: Wisconsin; Stanford	Dropped: Clemson; Ole Miss	Dropped: USC; California	

== BCS standings ==
	Week 7 Oct 18	Week 8 Oct 25	Week 9 Nov 1	Week 10 Nov 8	Week 11 Nov 15	Week 12 Nov 22	Week 13 Nov 29	Week 14 (Final) Dec 6	
1.	Florida (6–0)	Florida (7–0)	Florida (8–0)	Florida (9–0)	Florida (10–0)	Florida (11–0)	Florida (12–0)	Alabama (13–0)	1.
2.	Alabama (7–0)	Alabama (8–0)	Texas (8–0)	Alabama (9–0)	Alabama (10–0)	Alabama (11–0)	Alabama (12–0)	Texas (13–0)	2.
3.	Texas (6–0)	Texas (7–0)	Alabama (8–0)	Texas (9–0)	Texas (10–0)	Texas (11–0)	Texas (12–0)	Cincinnati (12–0)	3.
4.	Boise State (6–0)	Iowa (8–0)	Iowa (9–0)	TCU (9–0)	TCU (10–0)	TCU (11–0)	TCU (12–0)	TCU (12–0)	4.
5.	Cincinnati (6–0)	USC (6–1)	Cincinnati (8–0)	Cincinnati (9–0)	Cincinnati (10–0)	Cincinnati (10–0)	Cincinnati (11–0)	Florida (12–1)	5.
6.	Iowa (7–0)	TCU (7–0)	TCU (8–0)	Boise State (9–0)	Boise State (10–0)	Boise State (11–0)	Boise State (12–0)	Boise State (13–0)	6.
7.	USC (5–1)	Boise State (7–0)	Boise State (8–0)	Georgia Tech (9–1)	Georgia Tech (10–1)	Georgia Tech (10–1)	Oregon (9–2)	Oregon (10–2)	7.
8.	TCU (6–0)	Cincinnati (7–0)	Oregon (7–1)	LSU (7–2)	LSU (8–2)	Oregon (9–2)	Ohio State (10–2)	Ohio State (10–2)	8.
9.	LSU (5–1)	LSU (6–1)	LSU (7–1)	USC (7–2)	Pittsburgh (9–1)	Pittsburgh (9–1)	Iowa (10–2)	Georgia Tech (11–2)	9.
10.	Miami (FL) (5–1)	Oregon (6–1)	Georgia Tech (8–1)	Iowa (9–1)	Ohio State (9–2)	Ohio State (10–2)	Georgia Tech (10–2)	Iowa (10–2)	10.
11.	Oregon (5–1)	Georgia Tech (7–1)	Penn State (8–1)	Ohio State (8–2)	Oregon (8–2)	Iowa (10–2)	Penn State (10–2)	Virginia Tech (9–3)	11.
12.	Georgia Tech (6–1)	Penn State (7–1)	USC (6–2)	Pittsburgh (8–1)	Oklahoma State (8–2)	Oklahoma State (9–2)	Virginia Tech (9–3)	LSU (9–3)	12.
13.	Penn State (6–1)	Virginia Tech (5–2)	Pittsburgh (7–1)	Oregon (7–2)	Iowa (9–2)	Penn State (10–2)	LSU (9–3)	Penn State (10–2)	13.
14.	Virginia Tech (5–2)	Oklahoma State (6–1)	Utah (7–1)	Miami (FL) (7–2)	Penn State (9–2)	Virginia Tech (8–3)	BYU (10–2)	BYU (10–2)	14.
15.	Oklahoma State (5–1)	Pittsburgh (7–1)	Houston (7–1)	Houston (8–1)	Virginia Tech (7–3)	LSU (8–3)	Pittsburgh (9–2)	Miami (FL) (9–3)	15.
16.	BYU (6–1)	Utah (6–1)	Ohio State (7–2)	Utah (8–1)	Wisconsin (8–2)	Oregon State (8–3)	Oregon State (8–3)	West Virginia (9–3)	16.
17.	Houston (5–1)	Ohio State (6–2)	Miami (FL) (6–2)	Arizona (8–2)	Stanford (7–3)	Miami (FL) (8–3)	Miami (FL) (9–3)	Pittsburgh (9–3)	17.
18.	Utah (5–1)	Houston (6–1)	Arizona (5–2)	Penn State (8–2)	USC (7–3)	Clemson (8–3)	USC (8–3)	Oregon State (8–4)	18.
19.	Ohio State (5–2)	Miami (FL) (5–2)	Oklahoma State (6–2)	Oklahoma State (7–2)	Oregon State (7–3)	BYU (9–2)	California (8–3)	Oklahoma State (9–3)	19.
20.	Pittsburgh (6–1)	Arizona (5–2)	California (6–2)	Wisconsin (7–2)	Miami (FL) (7–3)	USC (7–3)	Oklahoma State (9–3)	Arizona (8–4)	20.
21.	Wisconsin (5–2)	West Virginia (6–1)	Wisconsin (6–2)	Virginia Tech (6–3)	Utah (8–2)	Utah (9–2)	Houston (10–2)	Stanford (8–4)	21.
22.	Arizona (4–2)	South Carolina (6–2)	Notre Dame (6–2)	BYU (7–2)	BYU (8–2)	California (8–3)	Nebraska (9–3)	Nebraska (9–4)	22.
23.	West Virginia (5–1)	Notre Dame (5–2)	Virginia Tech (5–3)	Oregon State (6–3)	Clemson (7–3)	Houston (9–2)	West Virginia (8–3)	Utah (9–3)	23.
24.	South Carolina (5–2)	California (5–2)	Oklahoma (5–3)	South Florida (6–2)	Houston (8–2)	North Carolina (8–3)	Stanford (8–4)	USC (8–4)	24.
25.	Kansas (5–1)	Ole Miss (5–2)	South Florida (6–2)	West Virginia (7–2)	California (7–3)	Ole Miss (8–3)	Utah (9–3)	Wisconsin (9–3)	25.
	Week 7 Oct 18	Week 8 Oct 25	Week 9 Nov 1	Week 10 Nov 8	Week 11 Nov 15	Week 12 Nov 22	Week 13 Nov 29	Week 14 (Final) Dec 6	
		Dropped: BYU; Wisconsin; Kansas	Dropped: West Virginia; South Carolina; Ole Miss	Dropped: California; Notre Dame; Oklahoma	Dropped: Arizona; South Florida; West Virginia	Dropped: Wisconsin; Stanford	Dropped: Clemson; North Carolina; Ole Miss	Dropped: California; Houston	
