= James Rodgers (gridiron football) =

American football player and coach (born 1988)

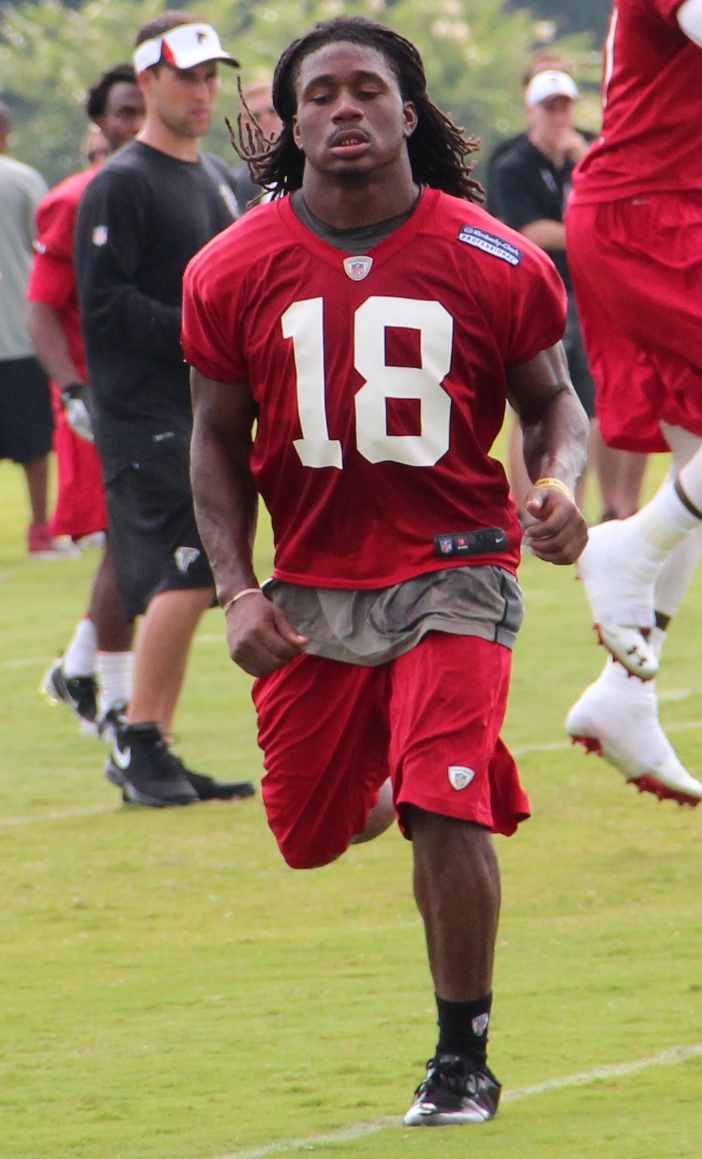
- Rodgers with the Atlanta Falcons in 2013

No. 18, 80
- Position: Wide receiver

Personal information
- Born: December 20, 1988 (age 37); Richmond, Texas, U.S.
- Listed height: 5 ft 7 in (1.70 m)
- Listed weight: 188 lb (85 kg)

Career information
- High school: Lamar Consolidated (Rosenberg, Texas)
- College: Oregon State
- NFL draft: 2012: undrafted

Career history

Playing
- Atlanta Falcons (2012–2013)*; Montreal Alouettes (2014)
- * Offseason or practice squad member only

Coaching
- San Antonio Commanders (2019) Outside linebackers coach; Wisconsin (2021) Offensive analyst; New Jersey Generals (2022) Wide receivers coach

Awards and highlights
- Second-team All-American (2009); 2× First-team All-Pac-10 (2008, 2009)

Career CFL statistics
- Receptions: 7
- Receiving yards: 88
- Receiving touchdowns: 1
- Stats at Pro Football Reference

James Rodgers Jr. (born December 20, 1988) is an American former football player who was a wide receiver for the Montreal Alouettes of the Canadian Football League (CFL). He played college football for the Oregon State Beavers, earning second-team All-American honors in 2009. Rodgers signed with the Atlanta Falcons as an undrafted free agent following the 2012 NFL draft.

== Early life ==
Rodgers attended Lamar Consolidated High School in Richmond, Texas, where he played wide receiver and free safety. He was the 2005 and 2006 District MVP and first-team All-State. He was also a star basketball and track athlete.

== College career ==
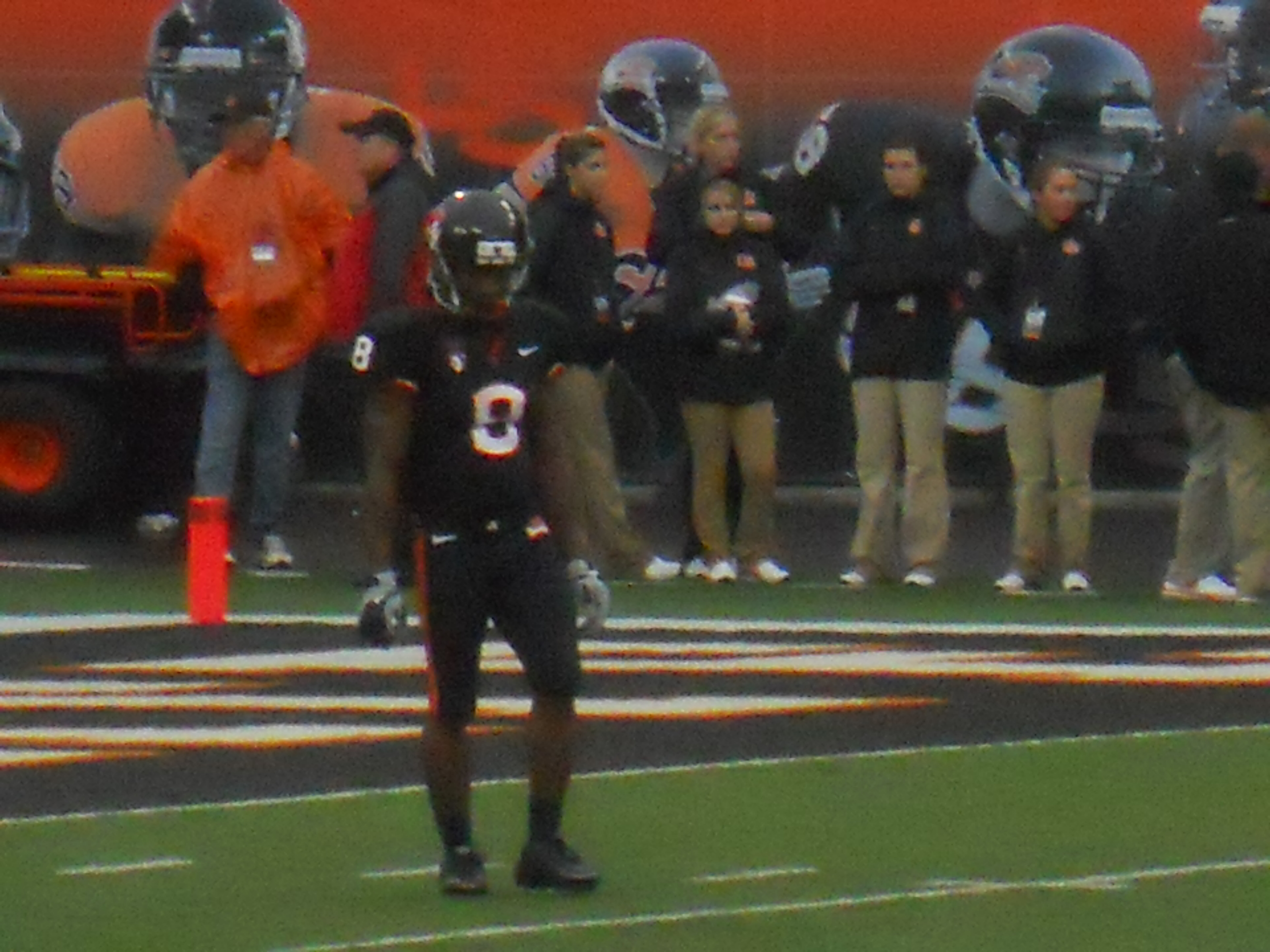
Rodgers in a game vs. Louisville in 2010.

Rodgers attended Oregon State University, where he majored in speech communication and minored in ethnic studies.

As a freshman in 2007, Rodgers appeared in 13 games, recording 50 rushes for 586 yards, and three touchdowns. He also recorded 19 receptions for 208 yards and one touchdown. He also returned five kickoffs for 122 yards. In 2008, as a sophomore, he appeared in start 12 games. He recorded 46 carries for 408 yards, and five touchdowns. He also recorded 51 receptions for 607 yards, and four touchdowns. He also recorded 33 kickoff returns for 818 yards, and one touchdown. He was named the first-team All-conference as a kick returner. As a junior in 2009, he started 13 games. He recorded 58 carries for 346 yards and one touchdown. He also recorded 91 receptions for 1,034 yards and nine touchdowns. He also recorded 36 kick returns for 840 yards as well as 13 punt returns for 151 yards. In 2010 as a senior, he started four games. He recorded eight carries for 38 yards. He also recorded 16 receptions for 215 yards, and two touchdowns. He also recorded 12 kickoff returns for 344 yards as well as six punt returns for 110 yards, and one touchdown. On October 9, 2010, he suffered a knee injury that ended his season, allowing him to receive a medical redshirt. He returned in 2011, as a redshirt senior and started nine games. He recorded 11 carries for 75 yards. He also recorded 45 receptions for 514 yards and three touchdowns.

In his career at Oregon State, Rodgers set the Oregon State career record with 6,377 all-purpose yards. He was also the first player in school history to record 1,000 yards rushing and 2,000 yards receiving for his career. He also finished his career second on the school's list for career kick return yardage (2,124). He finished third in school history with 19 touchdown receptions. He finished sixth all-time in school history in punt return average (13.7). Recorded 41 consecutive games with a pass reception. He finished fourth in school history in career receiving yards (2,582). He also finished second on the school's all-time career receptions list (222).

=== College statistics ===
Year	Team	GP	Receiving				Rushing				Scrimmage		Kick return				Punt return			
Year	Team	GP	Rec	Yds	Avg	TD	Att	Yds	Avg	TD	100+	Yd/G	Ret	Yds	Avg	TD	Ret	Yds	Avg	TD
2007	Oregon State	13	19	208	10.9	1	50	586	11.7	3	1	61.1	5	122	24.4	0				
2008	Oregon State	12	51	607	11.9	4	46	408	8.9	5	3	84.6	33	818	24.8	1				
2009	Oregon State	13	91	1034	11.4	9	58	303	5.2	1	7	102.8	36	840	23.3	0	13	151	11.6	0
2010	Oregon State	4	16	215	13.4	2	8	38	4.8	0	1	63.3	12	344	28.7	0	6	110	18.3	1
2011	Oregon State	9	45	514	11.4	3	11	75	6.8	0	0	65.4								
Total		51	222	2,578	11.6	19	193	1,410	8.9	9	12	78.2	86	2,124	24.7	1	19	261	13.7	1

=== Track and field ===
Rodgers was also a track star at Oregon State. He competed in the 100 meters and the 200 meters, posting personal bests of 10.33 seconds and 22.05 seconds.

Personal bests

Event	Time (seconds)	Venue	Date
100 meters	10.45	Houston, Texas	May 2, 2009
200 meters	22.00	Houston, Texas	May 16, 2009

== Professional career ==
Pre-draft measurables
Height	Weight	Arm length	Hand span	40-yard dash	10-yard split	20-yard split	20-yard shuttle	Three-cone drill	Vertical jump	Broad jump	Bench press
5 ft 6 3/4 in (1.70 m)	184 lb (83 kg)	29 5/8 in (0.75 m)	8 3/4 in (0.22 m)	4.51 s	1.53 s	2.63 s	4.23 s	6.93 s	37 in (0.94 m)	9 ft 8 in (2.95 m)	19 reps
All values from NFL Combine/Oregon State's Pro Day

=== Atlanta Falcons ===
After going undrafted in the 2012 NFL draft, Rodgers signed with the Atlanta Falcons on April 30, 2012. He was released August 31, 2012. On September 12, he was signed to the Falcons' practice squad, where he spent the entire season. Before the start of the 2013 season, Rodgers was waived again, but he was re-signed to the practice squad.

=== Montreal Alouettes ===
Rodgers was signed to the Montreal Alouettes' practice roster on August 6, 2014. In 2014, he appeared in 10 games. He recorded seven receptions for 88 yards and one touchdown. He recorded 12 carries for 60 yards and one touchdown. He also recorded 11 kickoff returns for 206 yards, as well as 58 punt returns for 467 yards, and one touchdown.

== Coaching career ==
=== Nebraska ===
In August 2016, Rodgers joined the University of Nebraska–Lincoln athletic department as a graduate manager and player personnel intern.

=== San Antonio Commanders ===
In 2018, he became the running backs coach for his former college coach, Mike Riley, and the San Antonio Commanders of the Alliance of American Football. Shortly after being hired, he was switched to be the outside linebackers coach.

=== New Jersey Generals ===
In March 2022, Rodgers reunited with Riley when he joined his staff as the wide receivers coach for the New Jersey Generals of the USFL.

== Personal life ==
Rodgers is the son of Tasha Williams and James Rodgers Sr. He is also the nephew of retired safety Michael Lewis. He also has three siblings, including Jacquizz Rodgers, a former NFL running back, who he was also teammates with during his tenure at Oregon State.
